= List of United States representatives who served a single term =

There are United States representatives who spent only a single two-year term (or less) in office usually either due to death, resignation, or electoral defeat. In some rare cases, freshmen members have decided to run for another office or not run for reelection, and two members (John William Reid and George Santos) have been expelled. Many members who serve in the House for only one term are viewed by historians and political experts as having won under circumstances largely beyond their control, such as riding in on the coattails of a popular presidential or statewide candidate of their party, or by running against a scandalized incumbent. Other special cases include Morris Michael Edelstein, who won a special election to the 76th United States Congress, won re-election to a full term to the 77th United States Congress, but died early in that term after serving less than two years total.

Not included in this list are non-voting delegates. Members who served in the United States Congress, but also served in the Congress of the Confederate States or as a delegate, are included. For members-elect who never took office, see List of United States representatives-elect who never took their seats.

== 1st Congress (1789–1791) ==
Name	Party	District	Term	Notes
Theodorick Bland	Anti-Administration	Virginia 9	March 4, 1789 – June 1, 1790	Died.
Timothy Bloodworth	Anti-Administration	North Carolina 3	April 6, 1790 – March 3, 1791	Retired.
Aedanus Burke	Anti-Administration	South Carolina 2	March 4, 1789 – March 3, 1791	Retired.
Daniel Carroll	Pro-Administration	Maryland 6	March 4, 1789 – March 3, 1791	Retired.
George Clymer	Pro-Administration	Pennsylvania at-large	March 4, 1789 – March 3, 1791	Retired.
Benjamin Contee	Anti-Administration	Maryland 3	March 4, 1789 – March 3, 1791	Retired.
William Floyd	Anti-Administration	New York 1	March 4, 1789 – March 3, 1791	Lost re-election.
George Gale	Pro-Administration	Maryland 5	March 4, 1789 – March 3, 1791	Lost re-election.
Jonathan Grout	Anti-Administration	Massachusetts 8	March 4, 1789 – March 3, 1791	Retired.
Benjamin Huntington	Pro-Administration	Connecticut at-large	March 4, 1789 – March 3, 1791	Retired.
James Jackson	Anti-Administration	Georgia 1	March 4, 1789 – March 3, 1791	Lost re-election.
George Mathews	Anti-Administration	Georgia 3	March 4, 1789 – March 3, 1791	Retired.
George Partridge	Pro-Administration	Massachusetts 5	March 4, 1789 – August 16, 1790	Resigned.
Roger Sherman	Pro-Administration	Connecticut at-large	March 4, 1789 – March 3, 1791	Re-elected, but declined seat to become U.S. senator.
William Smith	Anti-Administration	Maryland 4	March 4, 1789 – March 3, 1791	Retired.
Michael Jenifer Stone	Anti-Administration	Maryland 1	March 4, 1789 – March 3, 1791	Retired.
Jeremiah Van Rensselaer	Anti-Administration	New York 6	March 4, 1789 – March 3, 1791	Retired.
Henry Wynkoop	Anti-Administration	Pennsylvania at-large	March 4, 1789 – March 3, 1791	Retired.

== 2nd Congress (1791–1793) ==
Name	Party	District	Term	Notes
Robert Barnwell	Pro-Administration	South Carolina 2	March 4, 1791 – March 3, 1793	Retired.
Israel Jacobs	Pro-Administration	Pennsylvania 3	March 4, 1791 – March 3, 1793	Lost re-election.
Philip Key	Pro-Administration	Maryland 1	March 4, 1791 – March 3, 1793	Lost re-election.
Cornelius C. Schoonmaker	Anti-Administration	New York 4	March 4, 1791 – March 3, 1793	Lost re-election.
Upton Sheredine	Anti-Administration	Maryland 6	March 4, 1791 – March 3, 1793	Retired.
Samuel Sterett	Anti-Administration	Maryland 4	March 4, 1791 – March 3, 1793	Retired.
Anthony Wayne	Anti-Administration	Georgia 1	March 4, 1791 – March 21, 1792	Seat declared vacant due to dispute over his residency.
Francis Willis	Anti-Administration	Georgia 3	March 4, 1791 – March 3, 1793	Retired.

== 3rd Congress (1793–1795) ==
Name	Party	District	Term	Notes
James Armstrong	Pro-Administration	Pennsylvania at-large	March 4, 1793 – March 3, 1795	Retired.
John Beatty	Pro-Administration	New Jersey at-large	March 4, 1793 – March 3, 1795	Retired.
Thomas P. Carnes	Anti-Administration	Georgia at-large	March 4, 1793 – March 3, 1795	Retired.
David Cobb	Pro-Administration	Massachusetts at-large	March 4, 1793 – March 3, 1795	Redistricted to the 7th district. Lost re-election in new district.
Peleg Coffin Jr.	Pro-Administration	Massachusetts 3	March 4, 1793 – March 3, 1795	Retired
Benjamin Edwards	Pro-Administration	Maryland 3	January 2, 1795 – March 3, 1795	Won special election. Not a candidate for full term.
William Johnston Dawson	Anti-Administration	North Carolina 8	March 4, 1793 – March 3, 1795	Lost re-election.
Samuel Dexter	Pro-Administration	Massachusetts 1	March 4, 1793 – March 3, 1795	Redistricted to the 9th district. Lost re-election in new district.
Uriah Forrest	Pro-Administration	Maryland 3	March 4, 1793 – November 8, 1794	Resigned.
Alexander Gillon	Anti-Administration	South Carolina 5	March 4, 1793 – October 6, 1794	Died.
Samuel Holten	Anti-Administration	Massachusetts 1	March 4, 1793 – March 3, 1795	Redistricted to the 10th district. Lost re-election in new district.
John Hunter	Anti-Administration	South Carolina 2	March 4, 1793 – March 3, 1795	Redistricted to the 5th district Lost re-election in new district.
William Irvine	Anti-Administration	Pennsylvania at-large	March 4, 1793 – March 3, 1795	Lost re-election.
Henry Latimer	Pro-Administration	Delaware at-large	February 14, 1794 – February 7, 1795	Won special election. Lost election to full term. Resigned early.
Joseph McDowell	Anti-Administration	North Carolina 1	March 4, 1793 – March 3, 1795	Lost re-election.
Joseph Neville	Anti-Administration	North Carolina 8	March 4, 1793 – March 3, 1795	Lost re-election.
Andrew Pickens	Anti-Administration	South Carolina 6	March 4, 1793 – March 3, 1795	Retired.
Silas Talbot	Pro-Administration	New York 10	March 4, 1793 – c. June 5, 1794	Resigned to assume role as Captain in the United States Navy.
Peter Van Gaasbeck	Pro-Administration	New York 4	March 4, 1793 – March 3, 1795	Retired.
Francis Walker	Anti-Administration	Virginia 14	March 4, 1793 – March 3, 1795	Lost re-election.
John Watts	Pro-Administration	New York 4	March 4, 1793 – March 3, 1795	Retired.
Benjamin Williams	Anti-Administration	Virginia 3	March 4, 1793 – March 3, 1795	Retired.
Paine Wingate	Pro-Administration	New Hampshire at-large	March 4, 1793 – March 3, 1795	Retired.

== 4th Congress (1795–1797) ==
Name	Party	District	Term	Notes
Daniel Buck	Federalist	Vermont 2	March 4, 1795 – March 3, 1797	Re-elected, but declined seat.
Jeremiah Crabb	Federalist	Maryland 3	March 4, 1795 – June 1, 1796	Resigned.
Samuel Earle	Democratic-Republican	South Carolina 6	March 4, 1795 – March 3, 1797	Retired.
Jesse Franklin	Democratic-Republican	North Carolina 3	March 4, 1795 – March 3, 1797	Lost re-election.
Thomas Henderson	Federalist	New Jersey at-large	March 4, 1795 – March 3, 1797	Lost re-election.
Samuel Maclay	Democratic-Republican	Pennsylvania 6	March 4, 1795 – March 3, 1797	Retired.
John Richards	Democratic-Republican	Pennsylvania 4	March 4, 1795 – March 3, 1797	Lost re-election.
Absalom Tatom	Democratic-Republican	North Carolina 4	March 4, 1795 – June 1, 1796	Resigned.
Isaac Smith	Federalist	New Jersey at-large	March 4, 1795 – March 3, 1797	Retired.
William Francis Strudwick	Federalist	North Carolina 4	November 28, 1796 – March 3, 1797	Won special election. Not a candidate for full term.

== 5th Congress (1797–1799) ==
Name	Party	District	Term	Notes
John Allen	Federalist	Connecticut at-large	March 4, 1797 – March 3, 1799	Retired.
David Brooks	Federalist	New York 5	March 4, 1797 – March 3, 1799	Lost re-election.
Stephen Bullock	Federalist	Massachusetts 7	March 4, 1797 – March 3, 1799	Lost re-election.
James Cochran	Federalist	New York 10	March 4, 1797 – March 3, 1799	Retired.
Hezekiah L. Hosmer	Federalist	New York 6	March 4, 1797 – March 3, 1799	Retired.
James Machir	Federalist	Virginia 3	March 4, 1797 – March 3, 1799	Retired.
William Matthews	Federalist	Maryland 6	March 4, 1797 – March 3, 1799	Retired.
Blair McClenachan	Democratic-Republican	Pennsylvania 5	March 4, 1797 – March 3, 1799	Retired.
Joseph McDowell Jr.	Democratic-Republican	North Carolina 1	March 4, 1797 – March 3, 1799	Lost re-election.
Daniel Morgan	Federalist	Virginia 1	March 4, 1797 – March 3, 1799	Retired.
Isaac Parker	Federalist	Massachusetts 12	March 4, 1797 – March 3, 1799	Retired.
William Smith	Democratic-Republican	South Carolina 6	March 4, 1797 – March 3, 1799	Lost re-election.
Peleg Sprague	Federalist	New Hampshire at-large	March 4, 1797 – March 3, 1799	Retired.

== 6th Congress (1799–1801) ==
Name	Party	District	Term	Notes
John Brown	Federalist	Rhode Island at-large	March 4, 1799 – March 3, 1801	Lost re-election.
Franklin Davenport	Federalist	New Jersey 5	March 4, 1799 – March 3, 1801	Lost re-election.
Joseph Dickson	Federalist	North Carolina 1	March 4, 1799 – March 3, 1801	Lost re-election.
Samuel Goode	Democratic-Republican	Virginia 8	March 4, 1799 – March 3, 1801	Lost re-election.
Elizur Goodrich	Federalist	Connecticut at-large	March 4, 1799 – March 3, 1801	Re-elected, but declined seat.
James Jones	Federalist	Georgia at-large	March 4, 1799 – March 3, 1801	Lost re-election.
Henry Lee III	Federalist	Virginia 19	March 4, 1799 – March 3, 1801	Retired.
Levi Lincoln, Sr.	Democratic-Republican	Massachusetts 4	December 15, 1800 – March 5, 1801	Won special election. Elected to full term, but resigned one day into term to become United States Attorney General.
James Linn	Democratic-Republican	New Jersey at-large	March 4, 1799 – March 3, 1801	Retired.
John Marshall	Federalist	Virginia 13	March 4, 1799 – June 7, 1800	Resigned to become United States Secretary of State.
Abraham Nott	Federalist	South Carolina 6	March 4, 1799 – March 3, 1801	Retired.
Robert Page	Federalist	Virginia 1	March 4, 1799 – March 3, 1801	Retired.
Jonas Platt	Federalist	New York 9	March 4, 1799 – March 3, 1801	Retired.
Leven Powell	Federalist	Virginia 17	March 4, 1799 – March 3, 1801	Retired.
James Sheafe	Federalist	New Hampshire at-large	March 4, 1799 – March 3, 1801	Retired.
David Stone	Democratic-Republican	North Carolina 8	March 4, 1799 – March 3, 1801	Re-elected, but declined seat to take seat in United States Senate.
Littleton Waller Tazewell	Democratic-Republican	Virginia 13	November 26, 1800 – March 3, 1801	Won special election. Not a candidate for full term.
John Chew Thomas	Federalist	Maryland 2	March 4, 1799 – March 3, 1801	Retired.

== 7th Congress (1801–1803) ==
Name	Party	District	Term	Notes
John Bacon	Democratic-Republican	Massachusetts 1	March 4, 1801 – March 3, 1803	Retired.
Thomas Boude	Federalist	Pennsylvania 28	March 4, 1801 – March 3, 1803	Lost re-election.
Charles Johnson	Democratic-Republican	North Carolina 8	March 4, 1801 – July 23, 1802	Died.
William Jones	Democratic-Republican	Pennsylvania 1	March 4, 1801 – March 3, 1803	Retired.
George Upham	Federalist	New Hampshire at-large	March 4, 1801 – March 3, 1803	Retired.
Thomas Morris	Federalist	New York 10	March 4, 1801 – March 3, 1803	Retired.
Joseph Peirce	Federalist	New Hampshire at-large	March 4, 1801 – March 3, 1802	Resigned.
Josiah Smith	Democratic-Republican	Massachusetts 6	March 4, 1801 – March 3, 1803	Retired.
John Stratton	Federalist	Virginia 12	March 4, 1801 – March 3, 1803	Retired.
Thomas Tillotson	Federalist	New York 5	March 4, 1801 – August 10, 1801	Resigned to become Secretary of State of New York.
George Upham	Federalist	New Hampshire at-large	March 4, 1801 – March 3, 1803	Retired.
John Peter Van Ness	Democratic-Republican	New York 7	October 6, 1801 – January 13, 1803	Won special election. Seat declared vacant after losing re-election.
Benjamin Walker	Federalist	New York 9	March 4, 1801 – March 3, 1803	Retired.

== 8th Congress (1803–1805) ==
Name	Party	District	Term	Notes
Simeon Baldwin	Democratic-Republican	Connecticut at-large	March 4, 1803 – March 3, 1805	Retired.
Isaac Bloom	Federalist	New York 6	March 4, 1803 – April 26, 1803	Died.
Thomas Dwight	Federalist	Massachusetts 5	March 4, 1803 – March 3, 1805	Retired.
Thomas Lewis Jr.	Federalist	Virginia 5	March 4, 1803 – March 3, 1804	Seat declared vacant.
Phineas Bruce	Federalist	Massachusetts 17	March 4, 1803 – ?	Prevented from qualifying by illness.
John B. Earle	Democratic-Republican	South Carolina 8	March 4, 1803 – March 3, 1805	Re-elected, but declined seat.
Thomas Griffin	Federalist	Virginia 12	March 4, 1803 – March 3, 1805	Lost re-election..
Gaylord Griswold	Federalist	New York 15	March 4, 1803 – March 3, 1805	Retired.
Samuel Hammond	Democratic-Republican	Georgia at-large	March 4, 1803 – February 2, 1805	Resigned.
John Hoge	Democratic-Republican	Pennsylvania 10	November 2, 1804 – March 3, 1805	Won special election. Not a candidate for full term.
Simon Larned	Democratic-Republican	Massachusetts 12	November 5, 1804 – March 3, 1805	Won special election. Not a candidate for full term.

- Andrew McCord DR-NY
- Nahum Mitchell Federalist-MA
- Beriah Palmer DR-NY
- John Paterson DR-NY
- Oliver Phelps DR-NY
- Samuel D. Purviance Federalist-NC
- George Tibbits Federalist-NY

== 9th Congress (1805–1807) ==
Name	Party	District	Term	Notes
Leonard Covington	Democratic-Republican	Maryland 2	March 4, 1805 – March 3, 1807	Lost re-election.
Theodore Dwight	Federalist	Connecticut at-large	December 1, 1806 – March 3, 1807	Won special election. Not a candidate for full term.
Christian Lower	Democratic-Republican	Pennsylvania 3	March 4, 1805 – December 19, 1806	Retired. Died before term expired.
Patrick Magruder	Democratic-Republican	Maryland 3	March 4, 1805 – March 3, 1807	Lost re-election.
Cowles Mead	Democratic-Republican	Georgia at-large	March 4, 1805 – December 24, 1805	Lost election contest.
Martin G. Schuneman	Democratic-Republican	New York 7	March 4, 1805 – March 3, 1807	Retired.
Thomas Spalding	Democratic-Republican	Georgia at-large	December 24, 1805 – November 24, 1806	Won election contest. Lost re-election. Resigned early.
Nathan Williams	Democratic-Republican	New York 15	March 4, 1805 – March 3, 1807	Retired.

- Caleb Ellis F-NH
- Silas Halsey DR-NY
- John Hamilton DR-PA
- Duncan McFarlan DR-NC
- Peter Sailly DR-NY
- O'Brien Smith DR-SC
- Thomas W. Thompson F-NH
- Eliphalet Wickes DR-NY

== 10th Congress (1807–1809) ==
Name	Party	District	Term	Notes
Daniel Ilsley	Democratic-Republican	Massachusetts 15	March 4, 1807 – March 3, 1809	Lost re-election.
Joseph Story	Democratic-Republican	Massachusetts 2	May 23, 1808 – March 3, 1809	Won special election. Not a candidate for full term.
Peter Swart	Democratic-Republican	New York 13	March 4, 1807 – March 3, 1809	Retired.
Nathan Wilson	Democratic-Republican	New York 12	November 7, 1808 – March 3, 1809	Won special election. Not a candidate for full term.

- Peter Carleton DR-NH
- Josiah Dean DR-MA
- Daniel Meserve Durell DR-NH
- Francis Gardner DR-NH
- John Harris DR-NY
- John Hiester DR-PA
- Reuben Humphrey DR-NY
- William Kirkpatrick DR-NY
- John Rowan DR-KY
- Jedediah K. Smith DR-NH
- Clement Storer DR-NH
- James I. Van Alen DR-NY
- Jesse Wharton DR-TN
- Isaac Wilbour DR-RI
- James Witherell DR-VT

== 11th Congress (1809–1811) ==
Name	Party	District	Term	Notes
Joseph Allen	Federalist	Massachusetts 10	October 8, 1810 – March 3, 1811	Won special election. Not a candidate for full term.
Nathaniel Appleton Haven	Federalist	New Hampshire at-large	March 4, 1809 – March 3, 1811	Retired.
Herman Knickerbocker	Federalist	New York 6	March 4, 1809 – March 3, 1811	Retired.
Vincent Mathews	Federalist	New York 14	March 4, 1809 – March 3, 1811	Retired.
Jacob Swoope	Federalist	Virginia 4	March 4, 1809 – March 3, 1811	Retired.

- William T. Barry DR-KY
- Daniel Blaisdell F-NH
- John Brown DR-MD
- John Curtis Chamberlain F-NH
- James Cox DR-NJ
- Henry Crist DR-KY
- William Denning DR-NY
- Gideon Gardner DR-MA
- David S. Garland DR-VA
- Daniel Hiester DR-PA
- Jonathan Hatch Hubbard F-VT
- William McKinley DR-VA
- Pleasant Moorman Miller DR-TN
- John Nicholson DR-NY
- Benjamin Pickman Jr. Federalist-MA
- John A. Scudder DR-NJ
- Robert Weakley DR-TN
- James Wilson I F-NH
- Robert Witherspoon DR-SC

== 12th Congress (1811–1813) ==
Name	Party	District	Term	Notes
Harmanus Bleecker	Federalist	New York 7	March 4, 1811 – March 3, 1813	Retired.
Thomas B. Cooke	Democratic-Republican	New York 5	March 4, 1811 – March 3, 1813	Retired.
Abner Lacock	Democratic-Republican	Pennsylvania 11	March 4, 1811 – March 3, 1813	Re-elected, but declined seat to accept appointment to U.S. Senate.
James Morgan	Democratic-Republican	New Jersey at-large	March 4, 1811 – March 3, 1813	Redistricted to the 2nd district. Lost re-election in new district.
George Sullivan	Federalist	New Hampshire at-large	March 4, 1811 – March 3, 1813	Retired.
William Widgery	Democratic-Republican	Massachusetts 15	March 4, 1811 – March 3, 1813	Lost re-election.

- John Baker F-VA
- Josiah Bartlett Jr. DR-NH
- Francis Carr DR-MA
- Samuel Dinsmoor DR-NH
- Asa Fitch F-NY
- Obed Hall DR-NH
- John Adams Harper DR-NH
- Joseph Lefever DR-PA
- George C. Maxwell DR-NJ
- Arunah Metcalf DR-NY
- James Milnor F-PA
- William Paulding Jr. DR-NY
- Benjamin Pond DR-NY
- William Rodman DR-PA
- Silas Stow DR-NY
- Peleg Tallman DR-MA
- Pierre Van Cortlandt Jr. DR-NY
- Leonard White Federalist-MA
- Thomas Wilson F-VA

== 13th Congress (1813–1815) ==
Name	Party	District	Term	Notes
Thomas Monteagle Bayly	Federalist	Virginia 13	March 4, 1813 – March 3, 1815	Retired.
John Henry Bowen	Democratic-Republican	Tennessee 4	March 4, 1813 – March 3, 1815	Retired.
John M. Bowers	Democratic-Republican	New York 15	June 21, 1813 – December 20, 1813	Lost election contest.
Alexander Boyd	Federalist	New York 13	March 4, 1813 – March 3, 1815	Retired.
Samuel Dana	Democratic-Republican	Massachusetts 4	September 22, 1814 – March 3, 1815	Won special election. Lost election to full term.
Daniel Dewey	Federalist	Massachusetts 12	March 4, 1813 – February 24, 1814	Resigned.
Joseph H. Hawkins	Democratic-Republican	Kentucky 2	March 29, 1814 – March 3, 1815	Won special election. Not a candidate for full term.
Morris S. Miller	Federalist	New York 16	March 4, 1813 – March 3, 1815	Retired.
Joel Thompson	Democratic-Republican	New York 15	March 4, 1813 – March 3, 1815	Retired.

- Reasin Beall DR-OH
- Thomas Bines DR-NJ
- Ezra Butler DR-VT
- Hugh Caperton F-VA
- William Coxe Jr. F-NJ
- Edward Crouch DR-PA
- Samuel Davis F-MA
- Peter Denoyelles DR-NY
- William Pope Duval DR-KY
- David R. Evans DR-SC
- Samuel Farrow DR-SC
- Peter Forney DR-NC
- James Geddes F-NY
- John Gloninger F-PA
- Theodore Gourdin DR-SC
- Abraham J. Hasbrouck DR-NY
- Samuel Henderson F-PA
- Samuel Hopkins DR-KY
- Samuel M. Hopkins F-NY
- Nathaniel W. Howell F-NY
- Levi Hubbard DR-MA
- Parry Wayne Humphreys DR-TN
- John Kershaw DR-SC
- John Lefferts DR-NY
- Jacob Markell F-NY
- Jotham Post Jr. F-NY
- Samuel Sherwood F-NY
- Zebulon R. Shipherd F-NY
- Richard Skinner DR-VT
- Isaac Smith DR-PA
- Samuel Smith F-NH
- William Stephens Smith F-NY
- Richard Stockton F-NJ
- Adamson Tannehill DR-PA
- Francis White F-VA
- James Whitehill DR-PA
- Elisha I. Winter F-NY
- Abiel Wood DR-MA

== 14th Congress (1815–1817) ==
Name	Party	District	Term	Notes
Micah Brooks	Democratic-Republican	New York 21	March 4, 1815 – March 3, 1817	Retired.
Benjamin Brown	Federalist	Massachusetts 16	March 4, 1815 – March 3, 1817	Redistricted to the 18th district. Lost re-election in new district.
Thomas Burnside	Democratic-Republican	Pennsylvania 9	October 10, 1815 – April 15, 1816	Won special election. Resigned.
James Carr	Federalist	Massachusetts 17	March 4, 1815 – March 3, 1817	Retired.
Thomas Clayton	Federalist	Delaware at-large	March 4, 1815 – March 3, 1817	Lost re-election.
Samuel S. Conner	Democratic-Republican	Massachusetts 19	March 4, 1815 – March 3, 1817	Redistricted to the 18th district. Lost re-election in new district.
Bennett H. Henderson	Democratic-Republican	Tennessee 4	March 4, 1815 – March 3, 1817	Retired.
Samuel Powell	Democratic-Republican	Tennessee 1	March 4, 1815 – March 3, 1817	Retired.
Magnus Tate	Federalist	Virginia 2	March 4, 1815 – March 3, 1817	Retired.
Enos T. Throop	Democratic-Republican	New York 20	March 4, 1815 – June 4, 1816	Lost re-election. Resigned early.
Jonathan Williams	Democratic-Republican	Pennsylvania 1	March 4, 1815 – May 16, 1815	Died.
John B. Yates	Democratic-Republican	New York 13	March 4, 1815 – March 3, 1817	Retired.

- Asa Adgate DR-NY
- Charles Humphrey Atherton F-NH
- Ezra Baker DR-NJ
- Samuel Betts DR-NY
- James Birdsall DR-NY
- Daniel Cady F-NY
- Daniel Chipman F-VT
- Archibald S. Clarke DR-NY
- Henry Crocheron DR-NY
- Samuel Dickens DR-NC
- Thomas Fletcher DR-KY
- John Hahn DR-PA
- Jabez Delano Hammond DR-NY
- Luther Jewett F-VT
- Chauncey Langdon F-VT
- William Carter Love DR-NC
- Asa Lyon F-VT
- Charles Marsh F-VT
- William Mayrant DR-SC
- John Noyes F-VT
- George Poindexter DR-MS
- William H. Roane DR-VA
- Asahel Stearns Federalist-MA
- Abraham H. Schenck DR-NY
- Thomas Smith F-PA
- Micah Taul DR-KY
- John Taylor DR-SC
- Isaac Thomas DR-TN
- Jonathan Ward DR-NY
- Westel Willoughby Jr. DR-NY
- John Woods F-PA
- James West Clark DR-NC
- William Woodward DR-SC

== 15th Congress (1817–1819) ==
- Heman Allen (of Colchester) DR-VT
- Archibald Austin DR-VA
- Joseph Bellinger DR-SC
- Thomas Claiborne DR-TN
- Edward Colston Federalist-VA
- Daniel Cruger DR-NY
- Isaac Darlington Federalist-PA
- John R. Drake Republican-NY
- Benjamin Ellicott Dr-NY
- Joshua Gage DR-MA
- Sylvester Gilbert DR-CT
- Salma Hale DR-NH
- Peter Hitchcock DR-OH
- Samuel E. Hogg DR-TN
- Uriel Holmes Federalist-CT
- William Hunter DR-VT
- Dorrance Kirtland DR-NY
- Thomas Lawyer Republican-NY
- William J. Lewis DR-VA
- George Washington Lent Marr DR-TN
- John McLean DR-IL
- George Mumford DR-NC
- Wilson Nesbitt DR-SC
- David A. Ogden Federalist-NY
- Alexander Ogle DR-PA
- Benjamin Orr F-MA
- James Owen Republican-NC
- John Fabyan Parrott DR-NH
- Levi Pawling Federalist-PA
- John Pegram DR-VA
- George Poindexter DR-MS
- James Porter DR-NY
- Philip Jeremiah Schuyler Federalist-NY
- Tredwell Scudder DR-NY
- David Scott DR-PA
- Samuel B. Sherwood Federalist-CT
- Jacob Spangler Republican-PA
- Thomas Speed DR-KY
- John Canfield Spencer DR-NY
- James Stewart Federalist-NC
- James Tallmadge Jr. DR-NY
- Nathaniel Terry Federalist-CT
- Rensselaer Westerlo Federalist-NY
- John P. Cushman F-NY
- Thomas Scott Williams Federalist-CT

== 16th Congress (1819–1821) ==
- Nathaniel Allen DR-NY
- Caleb Baker DR-NY
- Joseph Brevard Republican-SC
- William Brown DR-KY
- Henry Brush DR-OH
- Henry Hunter Bryan DR-TN
- Joseph Buffum Jr. DR-NH
- Walter Case DR-NY
- Robert Clark DR-NY
- John Condit DR-NJ
- John Crowell DR-AL
- John Alfred Cuthbert DR-GA
- Jacob H. De Witt DR-NY
- Edward Dowse Republican-MA
- John Fay Republican-NY
- William Donnison Ford Republican-NY
- John C. Gray DR-VA
- Ezra C. Gross DR-NY
- James Guyon Jr. DR-NY
- Aaron Hackley Jr. Republican-NY
- George Hall Republican-NY
- Nathaniel Hazard DR-RI
- Jacob Hibshman DR-PA
- Jonas Kendall Federalist-MA
- Martin Kinsley DR-MA
- Joseph S. Lyman DR-NY
- John McCreary DR-SC
- Thomas Grubb McCullough Federalist-PA
- Henry Meigs DR-NY
- Severn E. Parker DR-VA
- Harmanus Peek DR-NY
- Robert Philson DR-PA
- David Fullerton DR-PA
- Charles Pinckney DR-SC
- Jonathan Richmond DR-NY
- Bernard Smith DR-NJ
- James Stevens Republican-CT
- Randall S. Street F-NY

== 17th Congress (1821–1823) ==
- Gideon Barstow DR-MA
- Wingfield Bullock DR-KY
- Lewis Bigelow Federalist-MA
- Charles Borland Jr. DR-NY
- James D. Breckinridge Republican-KY
- Daniel Burrows Republican-CT
- Samuel Campbell DR-NY
- David Chambers Republican-OH
- Cadwallader D. Colden F-NY
- Alfred Conkling DR-NY
- Jeremiah Cosden Republican-MD
- Josiah Crudup DR-NC
- James Duncan Republican-PA
- John Gebhard F-NY
- Mark Harris DR-ME
- James Hawkes Republican-NY
- Josiah S. Johnston DR-LA
- Elias Keyes DR-VT
- Joseph Kirkland F-NY
- Richard McCarty DR-NY
- James McSherry Federalist-PA
- Thomas Murray Jr. DR-PA
- John Nelson W-MD
- John Phillips Federalist-PA
- Jeremiah H. Pierson DR-NY
- Daniel Rodney F-DE
- Charles H. Ruggles F-NY
- Jonathan Russell DR-MA
- John Speed Smith DR-KY
- Elijah Spencer DR-NY
- Micah Sterling F-NY
- Reuben H. Walworth DR-NY
- Phineas White DR-VT
- William D. Williamson DR-ME
- Samuel H. Woodson DR-KY
- Ludwig Worman F-PA
- Walter Patterson F-NY

== 18th Congress (1823–1825) ==
- Samuel Breck Adams-Clay Federalist-PA
- John W. Cady Adams-Clay Republican-NY
- Jacob Call Jackson Republican-IN
- Lot Clark Crawford Republican-NY
- Ela Collins Crawford Republican-NY
- Justin Dwinell Crawford Republican-NY
- Lewis Eaton Adams-Clay Republican-NY
- Charles A. Foote Crawford Republican-NY
- Joel Frost Crawford Republican-NY
- Alfred Moore Gatlin Crawford Republican-NC
- James W. Gazlay Jackson Republican-OH
- William Hayward Jr. Crawford Republican-MD
- John Herkimer Adams-Clay Republican-NY
- James L. Hogeboom Crawford Republican-NY
- Lemuel Jenkins Crawford Republican-NY
- Samuel Lawrence Adams-Clay Republican-NY
- John Lee Jackson Federalist-MD
- Stephen Longfellow Federalist-ME
- Duncan McArthur Adams-Clay Republican-OH
- George Outlaw Crawford Republican-NC
- John Patterson Adams-Clay Republican-OH
- William Prince Jackson Republican-IN
- John Richards Crawford Republican-NY
- James T. Sandford Jackson Republican-TN
- Peter Sharpe Adams-Clay Republican-NY
- Jonas Sibley Adams-Clay Republican-MA
- Richard Dobbs Spaight Jr. Crawford Republican-NC
- Philip Thompson Adams-Clay Republican-KY
- Jacob Tyson Crawford Republican-NY
- Robert Brank Vance Jackson Republican-NC
- Isaac Wayne Jackson Federalist-PA
- David White Adams-Clay Republican-KY
- Lemuel Whitman Adams-Clay Republican-CT
- Isaac Wilson DR-NY
- William Woods Adams-Clay Republican-NY
- Henry Olin DR-VT

== 19th Congress (1825–1827) ==
- Henry Ashley Jacksonian-NY
- Luther Badger Anti-Jacksonian-NY
- George William Crump Jacksonian-VA
- William Dietz Jacksonian-NY
- Nehemiah Eastman Anti-Jacksonian-NH
- Benjamin Estil Anti-Jacksonian-VA
- Nicoll Fosdick Anti-Jacksonian-NY
- Abraham Bruyn Hasbrouck Anti-Jacksonian-NY
- John Flournoy Henry Adams candidate-KY
- Richard Hines Jacksonian-NC
- Daniel Hugunin Jr. Anti-Jacksonian-NY
- Charles Humphrey Anti-Jacksonian-NY
- David Jennings Anti-Jacksonian-OH
- James Johnson Jacksonian-KY
- Charles Kellogg Jacksonian-NY
- Thomas Kittera Anti-Jacksonian-PA
- Jacob Krebs Jacksonian-PA
- Robert N. Martin Adams candidate-MD
- William McManus Anti-Jacksonian-NY
- James Meriwether Jacksonian-GA
- John Miller Anti-Jacksonian-NY
- Timothy H. Porter Adams candidate-NY
- Alfred H. Powell Adams candidate-VA
- Henry H. Ross Anti-Jacksonian-NY
- Thomas Shannon Anti-Jacksonian-OH
- Robert Taylor Anti-Jacksonian-VA
- Elias Whitmore Anti-Jacksonian-NY
- Bartow White National Republican-NY
- Thomas C. Worthington Adams candidate-MD
- John Wurts Jacksonian-PA

== 20th Congress (1827–1829) ==
- Samuel Anderson Adams candidate-PA
- David Barker Jr. Adams candidate-NH
- Stephen Barlow Jacksonian-PA
- Edward Bates Adams candidate-MO
- George O. Belden Jacksonian-NY
- Thomas H. Blake Adams candidate-IN
- Rudolph Bunner Jacksonian-NY
- Samuel Chase Anti-Jacksonian-NY
- John Davenport Anti-Jacksonian-OH
- David Ellicott Evans Jacksonian-NY
- John Floyd Jacksonian-GA
- Tomlinson Fort Jacksonian-GA
- Levin Gale Jacksonian-MD
- Nathaniel Garrow Jacksonian-NY
- Selah R. Hobbie Jacksonian-NY
- Richard Keese Jacksonian-NY
- Isaac Leffler Anti-Jacksonian-VA
- Francis Swaine Muhlenberg Anti-Jacksonian-OH
- David Plant Anti-Jacksonian-CT
- Oliver H. Smith Jacksonian-IN
- Thomas Sinnickson Anti-Jacksonian-NJ
- John G. Stower Jacksonian-NY
- Thomas Taber II Jacksonian-NY
- Hedge Thompson Anti-Jacksonian-NJ
- Daniel Turner Jacksonian-NC
- John J. Wood Jacksonian-NY
- Silas Wright Jacksonian-NY

== 21st Congress (1829–1831) ==
- Benedict Arnold Anti-Jacksonian-NY
- Robert Emmett Bledsoe Baylor Jacksonian-AL
- Thomas Beekman Anti-Jacksonian-NY
- Peter I. Borst Jacksonian-NY
- Elias Brown Jacksonian-MD
- Nicholas D. Coleman Jacksonian-KY
- Henry B. Cowles Anti-Jacksonian-NY
- Jacob Crocheron Jacksonian-NY
- Charles G. DeWitt Jacksonian-NY
- Edward Bishop Dudley Jacksonian-NC
- Samuel W. Eager Anti-Jacksonian-NY
- Isaac Finch Anti-Jacksonian-NY
- George Fisher Anti-Jacksonian-NY
- John M. Goodenow Jacksonian-OH
- Jehiel H. Halsey Jacksonian-NY
- Joseph Hawkins Anti-Jacksonian-NY
- Thomas Irwin Jacksonian-PA
- John Kincaid Jacksonian-KY
- Perkins King Jacksonian-NY
- George Gray Leiper Jacksonian-PA
- Alem Marr Jacksonian-PA
- Thomas Maxwell Jacksonian-NY
- William McCreery Jacksonian-PA
- Ebenezer F. Norton Jacksonian-NY
- Walter Hampden Overton Jacksonian-LA
- Gershom Powers Jacksonian-NY
- Jonah Sanford Jacksonian-NY
- James Shields Jacksonian-OH
- John Scott Jacksonian-PA
- Ambrose Spencer Anti-Jacksonian-NY
- Richard Spencer Jacksonian-MD

== 22nd Congress (1831–1833) ==
- John Adair Jacksonian-KY
- Robert Allison Anti-Masonic-PA
- William Babcock Anti-Masonic-NY
- Gamaliel H. Barstow Anti-Masonic-NY
- James Bates Jacksonian-ME
- John T. Bergen Jacksonian-NY
- Lauchlin Bethune Jacksonian-NC
- John Branch Jacksonian-NC
- Joseph Bouck Jacksonian-NY
- John Conrad Bucher Jacksonian-PA
- John A. Collier Anti-Masonic-NY
- Silas Condit Anti-Jacksonian-NJ
- Bates Cooke Anti-Masonic-NY
- Eleutheros Cooke Anti-Jackson-OH
- Charles Dayan Jacksonian-NY
- Henry Alexander Scammell Dearborn Anti-Jacksonian-MA
- Lewis Dewart Jacksonian-PA
- William Fitzgerald Jacksonian-TN
- William Hall Jacksonian-TN
- William Hogan Jacksonian-NY
- Henry Horn Jacksonian-PA
- Freeborn G. Jewett Jacksonian-NY
- Charles Clement Johnston Jacksonian-VA
- John King Jacksonian-NY
- Robert McCoy Jacksonian-PA
- Daniel Newnan Jacksonian-GA
- Edmund H. Pendleton Jacksonian-NY
- Edward C. Reed Jacksonian-NY
- John J. Roane Jacksonian-VA
- Nathan Soule Jacksonian-NY
- Isaac Southard Anti-Jacksonian-NJ
- Grattan H. Wheeler Anti-Masonic-NY
- Samuel J. Wilkin Anti-Jacksonian-NY

== 23rd Congress (1833–1835) ==
- John Adams Jacksonian-NY
- John J. Allen Anti-Jacksonian-VA
- William Allen Jacksonian-OH
- Charles Augustus Barnitz Anti-Masonic-PA
- Martin Beaty Anti-Jacksonian-KY
- James Martin Bell Anti-Jacksonian-OH
- Horace Binney Anti-Jacksonian-PA
- Charles Bodle Jacksonian-NY
- John Bull Anti-Jacksonian-MO
- Harry Cage Jacksonian-MS
- Richard Bennett Carmichael Jacksonian-MD
- Amos Davis Anti-Jacksonian-KY
- Benjamin F. Deming Anti-Masonic-VT
- Littleton Purnell Dennis Anti-Jacksonian-MD
- John H. Fulton Jacksonian-VA
- James Gholson Anti-Jacksonian-VA
- Nicoll Halsey Jacksonian-NY
- Samuel G. Hathaway Jacksonian-NY
- James P. Heath Jacksonian-MD
- Edward Howell Jacksonian-NY
- William Marshall Inge Jacksonian-TN
- Cornelius Lawrence Jacksonian-NY
- James Love Anti-Jacksonian-KY
- Robert Todd Lytle Jacksonian-OH (resigned and then won special election to finish own term)
- John McKinley Jacksonian-AL
- Charles McVean Jacksonian-NY
- Phineas Miner Anti-Jacksonian-CT
- Henry Mitchell Jacksonian-NY
- Robert Mitchell Jacksonian-OH
- John Murphy Jacksonian-AL
- Patrick H. Pope Jacksonian-KY
- Ebenezer Jackson Jr. Anti-Jacksonian-CT
- Noadiah Johnson Jacksonian-NY
- Cornelius Lawrence Jacksonian-NY
- Samuel M. Moore Anti-Jacksonian-VA
- Gayton P. Osgood Jacksonian-MA
- Dudley Selden Jacksonian-NY
- Thomas D. Singleton Nullifier-SC
- Charles Slade Jacksonian-IL
- John Truman Stoddert Jacksonian-MD
- William P. Taylor Anti-Jacksonian-VA
- Samuel Tweedy Anti-Jacksonian-CT
- Isaac B. Van Houten Jacksonian-NY
- Reuben Whallon Jacksonian-NY
- Edgar C. Wilson Anti-Jacksonian-VA

== 24th Congress (1835–1837) ==
- Michael Woolston Ash Jacksonian-PA
- Jeremiah Bailey Anti-Jacksonian-ME
- Samuel Barton Jacksonian-NY
- Matthias J. Bovee Jacksonian-NY
- Graham H. Chapin Jacksonian-NY
- William Chetwood Jacksonian-NJ
- David Dickson Anti-Jacksonian-MS
- Valentine Efner Jacksonian-NY
- Dudley Farlin Jacksonian-NY
- William Graham W-IN
- Samuel Hoar Anti-Jacksonian-MA
- Elias Howell Anti-Jacksonian-OH
- Adam Huntsman Jacksonian-TN
- Andrew T. Judson Jacksonian-CT
- Gideon Lee Jacksonian-NY
- Joshua Lee Jacksonian-NY
- Thomas C. Love Anti-Jacksonian-NY
- William Mason Jacksonian-NY
- Rutger B. Miller Jacksonian-NY
- John James Pearson Anti-Jacksonian-PA
- Ebenezer Pettigrew Anti-Jacksonian-NC
- Joseph Reynolds Jacksonian-NY
- John W. A. Sanford Jacksonian-GA
- William Seymour Jacksonian-NY
- Nicholas Sickles Jacksonian-NY
- William Sprague III W-NY
- Bellamy Storer Anti-Jacksonian-OH
- James C. Terrell Jacksonian-GA
- Zalmon Wildman Jacksonian-CT

== 25th Congress (1837–1839) ==
- James Alexander Jr. W-OH
- John T. Andrews D-NY
- Cyrus Beers D-NY
- Bennet Bicknell D-NY
- Samuel Birdsall D-NY
- Isaac H. Bronson D-NY
- Andrew DeWitt Bruyn D-NY
- Timothy J. Carter D-ME
- Richard Cheatham W-TN
- Jonathan Cilley D-ME
- Charles D. Coffin W-OH
- George Hedford Dunn W-IN
- John Edwards D-NY
- James Farrington D-NH
- Richard Fletcher W-MA
- Henry A. Foster D-NY
- Albert Gallup D-NY
- Abraham P. Grant D-NY
- Hiram Gray D-NY
- Francis Jacob Harper D-PA
- William H. Hunter D-OH
- Hugh S. Legaré D-SC
- Andrew W. Loomis W-OH
- Arphaxed Loomis D-NY
- James Murray Mason D-VA
- Richard Menefee W-KY
- John L. Murray D-KY
- William H. Noble D-NY
- Joseph C. Noyes W-ME
- William Patterson W-NY
- Amasa J. Parker D-NY
- Isaac S. Pennybacker D-VA
- Seargent Smith Prentiss W-MS
- Harvey Putnam W-NY
- Luther Reily D-PA
- Edward Robinson W-ME
- Edward Rumsey W-KY
- Samuel Tredwell Sawyer W-NC
- Daniel Sheffer D-PA
- Matthias Shepler D-OH
- Mark H. Sibley W-NY
- James B. Spencer D-NY
- Adam W. Snyder D-IL
- William Wright Southgate W-KY
- William Stone W-TN
- Archibald Stuart D-VA
- Obadiah Titus D-NY
- Henry Vail D-NY
- Abraham Vanderveer D-NY
- Thomas J. Word W-MS

== 26th Congress (1839–1841) ==
- Judson Allen D-NY
- James C. Alvord W-MA
- Simeon H. Anderson W-KY
- Henry Marie Brackenridge W-PA
- Anson Brown W-NY
- James Carroll D-MD
- Thomas Withers Chinn W-LA
- William Raworth Cooper D-NJ
- John Davis D-PA
- James De La Montanya D-NY
- Nicholas B. Doe W-NY
- Nehemiah H. Earll D-NY
- John Ely D-NY
- John Fine D-NY
- Moses H. Grinnell W-NY
- Augustus C. Hand D-NY
- John Hill D-NC
- John Hill W-VA
- Solomon Hillen Jr. D-MD
- Joel Holleman D-VA
- Hines Holt W-GA
- Tilghman Howard D-IN
- Charles Johnston W-NY
- Thomas Kempshall W-NY
- Joseph Kille D-NJ
- Isaac Leet D-PA
- Meredith Mallory D-NY
- William M. McCarty W-VA
- George McCulloch D-PA
- James Monroe W-NY
- Rufus Palen W-NY
- William Sterrett Ramsey D-PA
- Thomas Robinson Jr. D-DE
- Edward Rogers D-NY
- Daniel Bailey Ryall D-NJ
- Green Berry Samuels D-VA
- Albert Smith D-ME
- John Smith D-VT
- Theron R. Strong D-NY
- Jonathan Taylor D-OH
- Peter Dumont Vroom D-NJ
- Peter Joseph Wagner W-NY

== 27th Congress (1841–1843) ==
- Elisha Hunt Allen W-ME
- Sherlock James Andrews W-OH
- Alfred Babcock W-NY
- Richard W. Barton W-VA
- Henry White Beeson D-PA
- Henry Black W-PA
- Bernard Blair W-NY
- Samuel S. Bowne D-NY
- David Bronson W-ME
- William Butler W-SC
- Patrick C. Caldwell D-SC
- Greene Washington Caldwell D-NC
- Thomas Jefferson Campbell W-TN
- Robert L. Caruthers W-TN
- George B. Cary D-VA
- Benjamin S. Cowen W-OH
- James H. Cravens W-IN
- George W. Crawford W-GA
- John Bennett Dawson D-LA
- Davis Dimock Jr. D-PA
- John Cummins Edwards D-MO
- Joseph Egbert D-NY
- William P. Fessenden W-ME
- Charles A. Floyd D-NY
- A. Lawrence Foster W-NY
- John Greig W-NY
- Amos Gustine D-PA
- William M. Gwin D-MS
- William Alexander Harris D-VA
- Samuel Lewis Hays D-VA
- Jacob Houck Jr. D-NY
- Jacob M. Howard W-MI
- William W. Irwin W-PA
- William Jack D-PA
- Isaac Dashiell Jones W-MD
- Archibald L. Linn W-NY
- Alfred Marshall D-ME
- Thomas Francis Marshall W-KY
- John Thomson Mason Jr. D-MD
- Joshua Mathiot W-OH
- James Archibald Meriwether W-GA
- Anderson Mitchell W-NC
- William M. Oliver D-NY
- Bryan Owsley W-KY
- Samuel Partridge D-NY
- Nathanael G. Pendleton W-OH
- Cuthbert Powell W-VA
- Alexander Randall W-MD
- Lewis Riggs D-NY
- James I. Roosevelt D-NY
- James McPherson Russell W-PA
- John Sanford D-NY
- Benjamin Glover Shields D-AL
- John Snyder D-PA
- James Sprigg W-KY
- Samuel Stokely W-OH
- Alexander Hugh Holmes Stuart W-VA
- Thomas A. Tomlinson W-NY
- Samuel W. Trotti D-SC
- John Van Buren D-NY
- Henry Bell Van Rensselaer W-NY
- David Wallace W-IN
- William Henry Washington W-NC
- John Westbrook D-PA
- Joseph L. White W-IN
- James Wray Williams D-MD
- Augustus Young W-VT

== 28th Congress (1843–1845) ==
- John Baptista Ashe W-TN
- James Edwin Belser D-AL
- Pierre Bossier D-LA
- Gustavus Miller Bower D-MO
- Francis Brengle W-MD
- Henry R. Brinkerhoff D-OH
- Levi D. Carpenter D-NY
- Jeremiah E. Cary D-NY
- Shepard Cary D-ME
- George S. Catlin D-CT
- John Causin W-MD
- Absalom H. Chappell W-GA
- Samuel Chilton W-VA
- Duncan Lamont Clinch W-GA
- Chesselden Ellis D-NY
- Lucius Elmer D-NJ
- Isaac G. Farlee D-NJ
- Hamilton Fish W-NY
- Elias Florence W-OH
- Henry Frick W-PA
- George Fuller D-PA
- Byram Green D-NY
- John P. Hale D-NH
- Edward S. Hamlin W-OH
- William H. Hammett D-MS
- John J. Hardin W-IL
- Samuel Hays D-PA
- Joshua Herrick D-ME
- William Spring Hubbell D-NY
- James Madison Hughes D-MO
- Michael Hutchinson Jenks W-PA
- Perley B. Johnson W-OH
- Littleton Kirkpatrick D-NJ
- Alcée Louis la Branche D-LA
- John Basil Lamar D-GA
- Moses G. Leonard D-NY
- Lucius Lyon D-MI
- William C. McCauslen D-OH
- John Millen D-GA
- Heman A. Moore D-OH
- Willoughby Newton W-VA
- Thomas J. Paterson W-NY
- Elisha R. Potter Law and Order-RI
- Jacob Alexander Preston W-MD
- Meade Purdy D-NY
- Charles Manning Reed W-PA
- Orville Robinson D-NY
- Charles Rogers W-NY
- Jeremiah Russell D-NY
- Samuel C. Sample W-IN
- William Tandy Senter W-TN
- Thomas H. Seymour D-CT
- Samuel Simons D-CT
- John Slidell D-LA
- John T. Smith D-PA
- Thomas Ara Spence W-MD
- Lemuel Stetson D-NY
- John Stewart D-CT
- William Henry Stiles D-GA
- Alfred P. Stone D-OH
- Selah B. Strong D-NY
- Tilghman Tucker D-MS
- John I. Vanmeter W-OH
- John Wethered W-MD
- Benjamin White D-ME
- Joseph A. Wright D-IN

== 29th Congress (1845–1847) ==
- Stephen Adams D-MS
- Lemuel H. Arnold W-RI
- Joshua Fry Bell W-KY
- Asa Biggs D-NC
- William Henry Brockenbrough D-FL
- John Hull Campbell Know Nothing-PA
- William W. Campbell Know Nothing-NY
- John Smith Chipman D-MI
- Henry Selby Clark D-NC
- John F. Collin D-NY
- Albert Constable D-MD
- James La Fayette Cottrell D-AL
- Erastus D. Culver W-NY
- Francis A. Cunningham D-OH
- Edmund Strother Dargan D-AL
- Jefferson Davis D-MS
- John De Mott D-NY
- James C. Dobbin D-NC
- Henry T. Ellett D-MS
- Samuel S. Ellsworth D-NY
- Jacob Erdman D-PA
- Edwin Hickman Ewing W-TN
- John Hoge Ewing W-PA
- William Swan Garvin D-PA
- William Fell Giles D-MD
- Martin Grover D-NY
- Serranus Clinton Hastings D-IA
- John Henry W-IL
- Richard P. Herrick W-NY
- William J. Hough D-PB
- John W. Lawrence D-NY
- Owen D. Leib D-PA
- Edward Henry Carroll Long W-MD
- Barclay Martin D-TN
- John Preston Martin D-KY
- Moses McClean D-PA
- John D. McCrate D-ME
- William McDaniel D-MO
- John H. McHenry W-KY
- William S. Miller Know Nothing-NY
- Mace Moulton D-NH
- Thomas Willoughby Newton W-AR
- Archibald C. Niven D-NY
- Augustus L. Perrill D-OH
- Thomas Johns Perry D-MD
- Sterling Price D-MO
- Thomas C. Ripley W-NY
- John Runk W-NJ
- John Fairfield Scamman D-ME
- Henry J. Seaman Know Nothing-NY
- Leonard Henly Sims D-MO
- Stephen Strong D-NY
- Allen G. Thurman D-OH
- William Tredway D-VA
- Andrew Trumbo W-KY
- Bradford R. Wood D-NY
- Thomas M. Woodruff Know Nothing-NY
- William W. Woodworth D-NY
- Samuel G. Wright W-NJ
- Bryan Rust Young W-KY

== 30th Congress (1847–1849) ==
- Washington Barrow W-TN
- Hiram Belcher W-ME
- Ausburn Birdsall D-NY
- Esbon Blackmar W-NY
- Edward Bradley D-MI
- Jasper Ewing Brady W-PA
- Aylette Buckner W-KY
- Richard S. Canby W-OH
- Asa Clapp D-ME
- Franklin Clark D-ME
- Beverly L. Clarke D-KY
- William Collins D-NY
- Mason C. Darling D-WI
- Richard Spaight Donnell W-NC
- Daniel Duncan W-OH
- Garnett Duncan W-KY
- George Nicholas Eckert W-PA
- Thomas O. Edwards W-OH
- Elisha Embree W-IN
- John Wilson Farrelly W-PA
- David Fisher W-OH
- Thomas Flournoy W-VA
- Andrew S. Fulton W-VA
- John P. Gaines W-KY
- John Gayle W-AL
- Horace Greeley W-NY
- Dudley S. Gregory W-NJ
- Nathan K. Hall W-NY
- David Hammons D-ME
- William T. Haskell W-TN
- Hugh Lawson White Hill D-TN
- John M. Holley W-NY
- John Westbrook Hornbeck W-PA
- Alexander Irvin W-PA
- Alfred Iverson Sr. D-GA
- David S. Jackson D-NY
- John William Jones W-GA
- William Kennon Jr. D-OH
- Samuel Lahm D-OH
- Sidney Lawrence D-NY
- William T. Lawrence W-NY
- Abraham Lincoln W-IL
- Frederick William Lord D-NY
- Joseph Mullin W-NY
- Henry Nicoll D-NY
- John G. Palfrey W-MA
- John Perkins Jr. D-LA
- George Petrie D-NY
- William Ballard Preston W-VA
- William R. Rockhill D-IN
- James Dixon Roman W-MD
- Eliakim Sherrill W-NY
- John I. Slingerland W-NY
- Daniel B. St. John W-NY
- George Anson Starkweather D-NY
- Frederick A. Tallmadge W-NY
- Robert A. Thompson D-VA
- Patrick W. Tompkins W-MS
- Thomas J. Turner D-IL
- Cornelius Warren W-NY
- James S. Wiley D-ME

== 31st Congress (1849–1851) ==
- Nathaniel Albertson D-IN
- Henry P. Alexander W-NY
- William J. Alston W-AL
- Josiah M. Anderson W-TN
- George Rex Andrews W-NY
- William Van Ness Bay D-MO
- John Bell W-OH
- David A. Bokee W-NY
- Walter Booth Free Soil-CT
- Daniel Breck W-KY
- John Brisbin D-PA
- Alexander W. Buel D-MI
- Thomas B. Butler W-CT
- Samuel Calvin W-PA
- Thompson Campbell D-IL
- Joseph Casey W-PA
- Charles E. Clarke W-NY
- Orsamus Cole W-WI
- Charles Magill Conrad W-LA
- Joel Buchanan Danner D-PA
- Jesse Column Dickey W-PA
- Samuel Atkins Eliot W-MA
- Andrew Ewing D-TN
- Elbridge Gerry D-ME
- Rufus K. Goodenow W-ME
- Edward Gilbert D-CA
- Herman D. Gould W-NY
- Thomas C. Hackett D-GA
- Ransom Halloway W-NY
- Andrew K. Hay W-NJ
- Thomas Haymond W-VA
- Moses Hoagland D-OH
- William Terry Jackson W-NY
- James Leeper Johnson W-KYD-VA
- John Bozman Kerr W-MD
- John A. King W-NY
- James G. King W-NJ
- Joseph E. McDonald D-IN
- Finis McLean W-KY
- Thomas McKissock W-NY
- William McWillie D-MS
- Daniel F. Miller W-IA
- Jeremiah Morton W-VA
- Alexander Newman D-VA
- Andrew Jackson Ogle W-PA
- John Otis W-ME
- Allen Ferdinand Owen W-GA
- Richard Parker D-VA
- Charles Wesley Pitman W-PA
- Robert Rentoul Reed W-PA
- William Sprague W-MI
- Charles Stetson D-ME
- John R. Thurman W-NY
- Walter Underhill W-NY
- Hiram Walden D-NY
- Loren P. Waldo D-CT
- Marshall Johnson Wellborn D-GA
- William A. Whittlesey D-OH
- Amos E. Wood D-OH
- George Washington Wright I-CA
- Timothy R. Young D-IL

== 32nd Congress (1851–1853) ==
- Charles Andrews D-ME
- John Appleton D-ME
- Leander Babcock D-NY
- Thomas Bartlett Jr. D-VT
- Nelson Barrere W-OH
- Hiram Bell W-OH
- Thomas Marshal Bibighaus W-PA
- Obadiah Bowne W-NY
- John H. Boyd W-NY
- John Bragg D-AL
- George H. Busby D-OH
- George Houston Brown W-NJ
- Alexander H. Buell D-NY
- Charles Chapman W-CT
- Lincoln Clark D-IA
- James L. Conger W-MI
- Joseph Stewart Cottman W-MD
- John F. Darby W-MO
- George T. Davis W-MA
- Francis B. Fay W-MA
- John G. Floyd D-NY
- John D. Freeman Unionist-MS
- James M. Gaylord D-OH
- Robert Goodenow W-ME
- Emanuel B. Hart D-NY
- Augustus P. Hascall W-NY
- John Henry Hobart Haws W-NY
- Jerediah Horsford W-NY
- Thomas Y. Howe Jr. D-NY
- Willard Ives D-NY
- James Johnson Unionist-GA
- John Johnson ID-OH
- Joseph Henry Kuhns W-PA
- Joseph Aristide Landry W-LA
- Edward P. Little D-MA
- Edward C. Marshall D-CA
- Joseph W. McCorkle D-CA
- Ahiman Louis Miner W-VT
- Richard S. Molony D-IL
- James Turner Morehead D-NC
- John Alexander Morrison D-PA
- Charles Murphey Unionist-GA
- Benjamin D. Nabers Unionist-MS
- Eben Newton W-OH
- Andrew Parker D-PA
- Ebenezer J. Penniman W-MI
- Jared Perkins W-NH
- Rodman M. Price D-NJ
- William Hawkins Polk ID-TN
- Robert Rantoul Jr. D-MA
- Isaac Reed W-ME
- Reuben Robie D-NY
- Lorenzo Sabine W-MA
- Marius Schoonmaker W-NY
- Richardson A. Scurry D-TX
- William W. Snow D-NY
- Abraham P. Stephens D-NY
- James F. Strother W-VA
- Josiah Sutherland D-NY
- George W. Thompson D-VA
- Norton Strange Townshend D-OH
- Henry S. Walbridge W-NY
- Thomas Yates Walsh W-MD
- William Thomas Ward W-KY
- John Welch W-OH
- John Wells W-NY
- Addison White W-KY
- John Allen Wilcox Unionist-MS

== 33rd Congress (1853–1855) ==
- William T. S. Barry D-MS
- Nathan Belcher D-CT
- Thomas Hart Benton D-MO
- Azariah Boody W-NY
- Robert Malone Bugg W-TN
- Brookins Campbell D-TN
- Davis Carpenter W-NY
- Ebenezer M. Chamberlain D-IN
- George W. Chase W-NY
- James Chrisman D-KY
- Alfred H. Colquitt D-GA
- John Parsons Cook W-IA
- Samuel L. Crocker W-MA
- Thomas W. Cumming D-NY
- Francis B. Cutting D-NY
- Thomas Davis D-RI
- William Barton Wade Dent D-GA
- Edward Dickinson W-MA
- Augustus Drum D-PA
- William Dunbar D-LA
- Norman Eddy D-IN
- J. Wiley Edmands W-MA
- Andrew Ellison D-OH
- William Everhart W-PA
- E. Wilder Farley W-ME
- John Rankin Franklin W-MD
- Wiley Pope Harris D-MS
- George Hastings D-NY
- Isaac Ellmaker Hiester W-PA
- Clement S. Hill W-KY
- Charles Hughes D-NY
- Theodore Gaillard Hunt W-LA
- Harvey H. Johnson D-OH
- Roland Jones D-LA
- John Kerr Jr. W-NC
- George W. Kittredge D-NH
- Alfred William Lamb D-MO
- James Henry Lane R-IN
- Milton Latham D-CA
- Charles S. Lewis D-VA
- Samuel Lilly D-NJ
- William D. Lindsley D-OH
- Caleb Lyon I-NY
- John B. Macy D-WI
- James Maurice D-NY
- Samuel Mayall D-ME
- John McCulloch W-PA
- James A. McDougall Union Democrat-CA
- Ner Middleswarth W-PA
- Henry Augustus Muhlenberg D-PA
- David A. Noble D-MI
- Jared V. Peck D-NY
- Rufus Wheeler Peckham D-NY
- Bishop Perkins D-NY
- John Perkins Jr. D-LA
- Philip Phillips D-AL
- James T. Pratt D-CT
- David Addison Reese W-GA
- Peter Rowe D-NY
- Samuel Lyon Russell W-PA
- Wilson Shannon D-OH
- Jacob Shower D-MD
- Gerrit Smith Free Soil-NY
- George W. Smyth D-TX
- John F. Snodgrass D-VA
- Hestor L. Stevens D-MI
- Andrew Stuart D-OH
- David Stuart D-MI
- Christian Markle Straub D-PA
- John J. Taylor D-NY
- Isaac Teller W-NY
- Andrew Tracy W-VT
- Michael Carver Trout D-PA
- William M. Tweed D-NY
- Charles Wentworth Upham W-MA
- Joshua Van Sant D-MD
- Hiram Walbridge D-NY
- William Adams Walker D-NY
- Samuel H. Walley W-MA
- Michael Walsh D-NY
- Tappan Wentworth W-MA
- Theodoric R. Westbrook D-NY
- William Henry Witte D-PA

== 34th Congress (1855–1857) ==
- Thomas Peter Akers Know Nothing-MO
- Charles J. Albright Opposition-OH
- Lucien Barbour Indiana People's Party-IN
- David Barclay D-PA
- Hendley S. Bennett D-MS
- James Bishop Opposition-NJ
- Samuel Carey Bradshaw Opposition-PA
- Jacob Broom Know Nothing-PA
- John Cadwalader D-PA
- John P. Campbell Jr. Know Nothing-KY
- Thomas Child Jr. W-NY
- Bayard Clarke Opposition-NY
- Elisha D. Cullen Know Nothing-DE
- William Cumback Indiana People's Party-IN
- Jacob C. Davis D-IL
- Timothy C. Day Opposition-OH
- James W. Denver D-CA
- Samuel Dickson Opposition-NY
- Francis S. Edwards Know Nothing-NY
- Jonas R. Emrie Opposition-OH
- Lemuel D. Evans Know Nothing-TX
- Nathaniel Greene Foster Know Nothing-GA
- Samuel Galloway Opposition-OH
- William A. Gilbert Opposition-NY
- Augustus Hall D-IA
- Philemon T. Herbert D-CA
- George Tisdale Hodges R-VT
- Henry William Hoffman Know Nothing-MD
- David P. Holloway Indiana People's Party-IN
- Thomas R. Horton Opposition-NY
- Jonas A. Hughston Opposition-NY
- Rufus H. King Opposition-NY
- Jonathan Knight Opposition-PA
- Ebenezer Knowlton Opposition-ME
- William A. Lake Know Nothing-MS
- Alexander Keith Marshall Know Nothing-KY
- Andrew Z. McCarty Opposition-NY
- Killian Miller Opposition-NY
- Oscar F. Moore Opposition-OH
- James L. D. Morrison D-IL
- Robert Treat Paine - Know Nothing-NC
- John Jamison Pearce Opposition-PA
- George Washington Peck D-MI
- Guy R. Pelton Opposition-NY
- Edwin Godwin Reade Know Nothing-NC
- Thomas Rivers Know Nothing-TN
- David Fullerton Robison Opposition-PA
- Harvey D. Scott Opposition-IN
- William Henry Sneed American Party-TN
- James S. T. Stranahan Opposition-NY
- Samuel F. Swope American Party-KY
- James Thorington W-IA
- Mark Trafton Know Nothing-MA
- Job Roberts Tyson W-PA
- William Valk Know Nothing-NY
- Abram Wakeman W-NY
- Percy Walker Know Nothing-AL
- Cooper K. Watson Opposition-OH
- Hiram B. Warner D-GA
- William W. Welch American-CT
- Thomas R. Whitney Know Nothing-NY
- John Williams D-NY
- James Hutchinson Woodworth ID-IL

== 35th Congress (1857–1859) ==
- Nehemiah Abbott R-ME
- John Alexander Ahl D-PA
- Samuel G. Andrews R-NY
- Samuel Arnold D-CT
- William D. Bishop D-CT
- Guy M. Bryan D-TX
- Joseph Burns D-OH
- James M. Cavanaugh D-MN
- Henry Chapman D-PA
- Joseph R. Cockerill D-OH
- James Brown Clay D-KY
- Timothy Davis R-IA
- William Lewis Dewart D-PA
- James Bradford Foley D-IN
- James Lisle Gillis D-PA
- Charles J. Gilman R-ME
- James M. Gregg D-IN
- William S. Groesbeck D-OH
- La Fayette Grover D-OR
- Lawrence W. Hall D-OH
- Israel T. Hatch D-NY
- Charles D. Hodges D-IL
- James Hughes D-IN
- John Huyler D-NJ
- Owen Jones D-PA
- William High Keim R-PA
- James Landy D-PA
- William Lawrence D-OH
- Paul Leidy D-PA
- Joseph C. McKibbin D-CA
- Joseph Miller D-OH
- John Gallagher Montgomery D-PA
- Oliver A. Morse R-NY
- William Wallace Phelps D-MN
- Henry Myer Phillips D-PA
- Wilson Reilly D-PA
- William Fiero Russell D-NY
- John A. Searing D-NY
- Judson W. Sherman R-NY
- George Taylor D-NY
- John Thompson R-NY
- Allison White D-PA
- Jacob R. Wortendyke D-NJ
- Augustus Romaldus Wright D-GA

== 36th Congress (1859–1861) ==
- William Clayton Anderson Opposition-KY
- John D. Ashmore D-SC
- John Richard Barret D-MO
- Charles Lewis Beale R-NY
- Alexander Boteler Opposition-VA
- Reese Bowen Brabson Opposition-TN
- John Edward Bouligny American Party-LA
- Martin Butterfield R-NY
- John Chilton Burch D-CA
- John Carey R-OH
- Luther C. Carter R-NY
- David Clopton D-AL
- Stephen Coburn R-ME
- George B. Cooper D-MI
- Daniel Coleman DeJarnette Sr. Independent Democrat-VA
- Orris S. Ferry R-CT
- Ezra B. French R-ME
- James H. Graham R-NY
- Chapin Hall R-PA
- Andrew Jackson Hamilton Independent Democrat-TX
- Robert H. Hatton Opposition-TN
- William Helmick R-OH
- Thomas C. Hindman D-AR
- William Howard D-OH
- George Wurtz Hughes D-MD
- William Irvine R-NY
- James S. Jackson Unionist-KY
- John James Jones D-GA
- Benjamin Franklin Junkin R-PA
- William S. Kenyon R-NY
- John M. Landrum D-LA
- Charles H. Larrabee D-WI
- M. Lindley Lee R-NY
- Henry Clay Longnecker R-PA
- Peter Early Love D-GA
- Charles D. Martin D-OH
- Elbert S. Martin Independent Democrat-VA
- Jacob Kerlin McKenty D-PA
- Laban T. Moore Opposition-KY
- Thomas Amos Rogers Nelson Opposition-TN (elected to second term, but arrested by Confederate troops before he could take his seat)
- William Pennington R-NJ
- Roger Atkinson Pryor D-VA
- James L. Pugh D-AL
- James Minor Quarles Opposition-TN
- John Hazard Reynolds Anti-Lecompton Democrat-NY
- Jetur R. Riggs Anti-Lecompton Democrat-NJ
- Christopher Robinson R-RI
- John Schwartz Anti-Lecompton Democrat-PA
- William E. Simms D-KY
- William N. H. Smith Opposition-NC
- Daniel E. Somes R-ME
- Cyrus Spink R-OH
- Lansing Stout D-OR
- Thomas Clarke Theaker R-OH
- John W. H. Underwood D-GA
- Alfred Wells R-NY
- Morton S. Wilkinson R-MN
- John Wood R-PA

== 37th Congress (1861–1863) ==
- Goldsmith Bailey R-MA
- Stephen Baker R-NY
- Charles John Biddle D-PA
- George Washington Bridges Unionist-TN
- George H. Browne D/Constitutional Union-RI
- Charles Benedict Calvert Unionist-MD
- Samuel L. Casey Unionist-KY
- Jacob P. Chamberlain R-NY
- Andrew Jackson Clements Unionist-TN
- George T. Cobb D-NJ
- Frederick A. Conkling R-NY
- Martin F. Conway R-KS
- Thomas Buchecker Cooper D-PA
- John J. Crittenden Unionist-KY
- William P. Cutler R-OH
- William Morris Davis R-PA
- Isaac C. Delaplaine D-NY
- Alexander S. Diven R-NY
- George W. Dunlap Unionist-KY
- Samuel C. Fessenden R-ME
- T. A. D. Fessenden R-ME
- George P. Fisher Unionist-DE
- Benjamin Flanders R-LA
- Richard Franchot R-NY
- John Noble Goodwin R-ME
- Bradley F. Granger R-MI
- Edward Haight D-NY
- Luther Hanchett R-WI
- Richard A. Harrison Unionist-OH
- James S. Jackson Unionist-KY
- James Kerrigan ID-NY
- Cornelius Leary Unionist-MD
- William Eckart Lehman D-PA
- Frederick Low R-CA
- John W. Menzies Unionist-KY
- William Mitchell R-IN
- Anson Morrill R-ME
- Elijah Hise Norton D-MO
- Robert H. Nugen D-OH
- Timothy Guy Phelps R-CA
- Thomas Lawson Price D-MO
- John William Reid D-MO
- Albert G. Riddle R-OH
- William Paine Sheffield Sr. Union-RI
- George K. Shiel D-OR
- Socrates N. Sherman R-NY
- A. Scott Sloan R-WI
- Edward H. Smith D-NY
- Andrew J. Thayer D-OR
- Benjamin Thomas Unionist-MA
- Charles H. Upton Unionist-VA
- Chauncey Vibbard D-NY
- Amasa Walker R-MA
- William Wall R-NY
- Charles W. Walton R-ME
- George Catlin Woodruff D-CT
- Samuel T. Worcester R-OH

== 38th Congress (1863–1865) ==
- Lucien Anderson Unconditional Unionist-KY
- Augustus C. Baldwin D-MI
- James S. Brown D-WI
- Brutus J. Clay Unionist-KY
- Cornelius Cole R-CA
- John Creswell R-MD
- Joseph K. Edgerton D-IN
- John Ganson D-NY
- Henry W. Harrington D-IN
- Charles M. Harris D-IL
- Anson Herrick D-NY
- Wells A. Hutchins D-OH
- William Johnston D-OH
- Martin Kalbfleisch D-NY
- Francis Kernan D-NY
- Austin Augustus King D-MO
- Samuel Knox Unconditional Unionist-MO
- DeWitt Clinton Littlejohn R-NY
- Alexander Long D-OH
- Daniel Marcy D-NH
- Archibald McAllister D-PA
- John R. McBride R-OR
- James F. McDowell D-IN
- George Middleton D-NJ
- William Miller D-PA (Defeated Speaker Galusha Grow)
- Amos Myers R-PA
- Homer Augustus Nelson D-NY
- John O'Neill D-OH
- John Guier Scott D-MO
- Thomas Bowles Shannon R-CA
- Nathaniel B. Smithers Unconditional Unionist-DE
- Henry G. Stebbins D-NY
- Lorenzo De Medici Sweat D-ME
- William Temple D-DE
- Henry Wells Tracy IR-PA
- Ezra Wheeler D-WI
- Joseph W. White D-OH
- Abel Carter Wilder R-KS
- Henry G. Worthington R-NV

== 39th Congress (1865–1867) ==
- Abraham Andrews Barker R-PA
- Teunis G. Bergen D-NY
- John Bidwell R-CA
- Edmund Cooper Unionist-TN
- Charles Vernon Culver R-PA
- William Augustus Darling R-NY
- Joseph H. Defrees R-IN
- William E. Dodge R-NY
- John Hanson Farquhar R-IN
- Roswell Hart R-NY
- James Henry Dickey Henderson R-OR
- Ralph Hill R-IN
- Elijah Hise D-KY
- John Hogan D-MO
- Sidney T. Holmes R-NY
- Demas Hubbard Jr. R-NY
- Edwin N. Hubbell D-NY
- James Randolph Hubbell R-OH
- John W. Hunter D-NY
- Morgan Jones D-NY
- John R. Kelso IR-MO
- Andrew J. Kuykendall R-IL
- George R. Latham Unconditional Unionist-WV
- John W. Leftwich Unconditional Unionist-TN
- Turner M. Marquett R-NE
- Gilman Marston R-NH
- Donald C. McRuer R-CA
- William A. Newell R-NJ
- Henry Jarvis Raymond R-NY
- Burwell C. Ritter D-KY
- Lovell Rousseau Unconditional Unionist-KY
- George S. Shanklin D-KY
- Thomas N. Stilwell R-IN
- Nelson Taylor D-NY
- John Lewis Thomas Jr. Unconditional Unionist-MD
- Anthony Thornton D-IL
- Andrew H. Ward D-KY
- Samuel L. Warner R-CT
- Edwin R. V. Wright D-NJ

== 40th Congress (1867–1869) ==
- Demas Barnes D-NY
- W. Jasper Blackburn R-LA
- John Benton Callis R-AL
- Samuel Fenton Cary IR-OH
- Joseph W. Clift R-GA
- Manuel S. Corley R-SC
- Grenville M. Dodge R-IA
- William P. Edwards R-GA
- James T. Elliott R-AR
- William C. Fields R-NY
- Darwin Abel Finney R-PA
- John R. French R-NC
- James H. Goss R-SC
- Samuel F. Gove R-GA
- Joseph J. Gravely R-MO
- Asa Grover D-KY
- Cornelius S. Hamilton R-OH
- Thomas Haughey R-AL
- James M. Hinds R-AR
- Julius Hotchkiss D-CT
- Richard D. Hubbard D-CT
- Bethuel Kitchen R-WV
- William S. Lincoln R-NY
- Rufus Mallory R-OR
- James Mann D-LA
- Turner M. Marquette R-NE
- John Moffet D-PA
- James Mullins R-TN
- Carman A. Newcomb R-MO
- Benjamin W. Norris R-AL
- Solomon Newton Pettis R-PA
- Charles Wilson Pierce R-AL
- William A. Pile R-MO
- Daniel Polsley R-WV
- Charles H. Prince R-GA
- Green Berry Raum R-IL
- William H. Robertson R-NY
- Lewis Selye R-NY
- Thomas E. Stewart Conservative Republican-NY
- John Hubler Stover R-MO
- Nelson Tift D-GA
- John Trimble R-TN
- Michel Vidal R-LA

== 41st Congress (1869–1871) ==
- William Hepburn Armstrong R-PA
- Joel Funk Asper R-MO
- David Atwood R-WI
- Richard S. Ayer R-VA
- David S. Bennett R-NY
- Marion Bethune R-GA
- George Booker Conservative-VA
- Alfred Eliab Buck R-AL
- Hervey C. Calkin D-NY
- Orestes Cleveland D-NJ
- Stephen A. Corker D-GA
- George W. Cowles R-NY
- Noah Davis R-NY
- Edward Degener R-TX
- Edward F. Dickinson D-OH
- Joseph Dixon R-NC
- Joseph Benton Donley R-PA
- Isaac H. Duval R-WV
- David Patterson Dyer R-MO
- John Fisher R-NY
- Thomas Fitch R-NV
- James K. Gibson Conservative-VA
- Calvin Willard Gilfillan R-PA
- George Woodward Greene D-NY
- John Ashley Griswold D-NY
- Patrick Hamill D-MD
- Robert S. Heflin R-AL
- Truman H. Hoag D-OH
- Charles H. Holmes R-NY
- Charles Knapp R-NY
- Jefferson F. Long R-GA
- John Manning Jr. D-NC
- William Milnes Jr. Conservative-VA
- Samuel P. Morrill R-ME
- Eliakim H. Moore R-OH
- William W. Paine D-GA
- Darwin Phelps R-PA
- Charles Pomeroy R-IA
- William Farrand Prosser R-TN
- John Roberts Reading D-PA
- Henry Augustus Reeves D-NY
- Robert Ridgway Conservative-VA
- Anthony A. C. Rogers D-AR
- Stephen Sanford R-NY
- William Crawford Sherrod D-AL
- Joseph Showalter Smith D-OR
- William Jay Smith R-TN
- William Smyth R-IA
- Peter W. Strader D-OH
- Randolph Strickland R-MI
- William N. Sweeney D-KY
- Adolphus H. Tanner R-NY
- Lewis Tillman R-TN
- George W. Whitmore R-TX
- Morton S. Wilkinson R-MN
- Eugene McLanahan Wilson D-MN
- James J. Winans R-OH
- John Witcher R-WV
- William P. Wolf R-IA

== 42nd Congress (1871–1873) ==
- Ephraim Leister Acker D-PA
- Erasmus W. Beck D-GA
- John Lourie Beveridge R-IL
- John S. Bigby R-GA
- James G. Blair Liberal Republican-MO
- Alexander Boarman Liberal Republican-LA
- Elliott M. Braxton D-VA
- Robert Porter Caldwell D-TN
- John M. Carroll D-NY
- John M. Coghlan R-CA
- John V. Creely R-PA
- John Critcher D-VA
- Robert C. De Large R-SC
- Ozro J. Dodds D-OH
- Dudley M. DuBose D-GA
- John Edwards LR-AR
- Constantine C. Esty R-MA
- Moses W. Field R-MI
- Samuel C. Forker D-NJ
- Abraham Ellison Garrett D-TN
- Edward Isaac Golladay D-TN
- Milo Goodrich R-NY
- Samuel Griffith D-PA
- William Handley D-AL
- James M. Hanks D-AR
- James C. Harper D-NC
- Ellery Albee Hibbard D-NH
- Andrew King D-MO
- Thomas Kinsella D-NY
- Archibald T. MacIntyre D-GA
- Mahlon Dickerson Manson D-IN
- James McCleery R-LA
- William McClelland D-PA
- Henry D. McHenry D-KY
- William Matthews Merrick D-MD
- Benjamin Franklin Meyers D-PA
- Silas L. Niblack D-FL
- Aaron F. Perry R-OH
- Elizur H. Prindle R-NY
- Edward Y. Rice D-IL
- John Ritchie D-MD
- John Rogers D-NY
- Robert Roosevelt D-NY
- John E. Seeley R-NY
- Henry Sherwood D-PA
- James H. Slater D-OR
- Henry Snapp R-IL
- Thomas J. Speer R-GA
- Bradford N. Stevens D-IL
- Jabez G. Sutherland D-MI
- Benjamin S. Turner R-AL
- Joseph H. Tuthill D-NY
- William Wirt Vaughan D-TN
- Seth Wakeman R-NY
- Madison Miner Walden R-IA
- Joseph M. Warren D-NY
- William Williams D-NY

== 43rd Congress (1873–1875) ==
- William Albert R-MD
- Charles Albright R-PA
- Granville Barrere R-IL
- Josiah Begole D-MI
- John Berry D-OH
- James Soloman Biery R-PA
- Rees Bowen D-VA
- Frederick George Bromberg LR-AL
- Lewis C. Carpenter R-SC
- Amos Clark Jr. R-NJ
- Charles Clayton R-CA
- Isaac Clements R-IL
- Stephen A. Cobb R-KS
- Franklin Corwin R-IL
- Philip S. Crooke R-NY
- William Crutchfield R-TN
- Alexander Davis D-VA
- David M. De Witt D-NY
- Moses W. Field R-MI
- James C. Freeman R-GA
- Lewis B. Gunckel R-OH
- John Hagans R-WV
- Horace Harrison R-TN
- Samuel F. Hersey R-ME
- Ebenezer R. Hoar R-MA
- Asa Hodges R-AR
- Albert R. Howe R-MS
- Ira B. Hyde R-MO
- William Joseph Hynes LR-AR
- Hugh J. Jewett D-OH
- Lloyd Lowndes Jr. R-MD
- Effingham Lawrence D-LA
- John D. Lawson R-NY
- Barbour Lewis R-TN
- James R. Lofland R-DE
- John Alexander Magee D-PA
- James Stewart Martin R-IL
- Alexander S. McDill R-WI
- William P. McLean D-TX
- John McNulta R-IL
- David B. Mellish R-NY
- William S. Moore R-PA
- James Nesmith D-OR
- Jason Niles R-MS
- Richard C. Parsons R-OH
- Charles Pelham R-AL
- Harris M. Plaisted R-ME
- Austin F. Pike R-NH
- Alonzo J. Ransier R-SC
- James T. Rapier R-AL
- Morgan Rawls D-GA
- William H. Ray R-IL
- John Blake Rice R-IL
- Hiram Lawton Richmond R-PA
- James Wallace Robinson R-OH
- Henry B. Sayler R-IN
- Richard Schell D-NY
- Henry Joel Scudder R-NY
- Isaac W. Scudder R-NJ
- James Beverley Sener R-VA
- Charles Christopher Sheats R-AL
- George A. Sheridan Liberal Republican-LA
- Andrew Sloan R-GA
- Edwin O. Stanard R-MO
- Elisha Standiford D-KY
- William B. Small R-NH
- James S. Smart R-NY
- George Luke Smith R-LA
- John Ambler Smith R-VA
- John Quincy Smith R-OH
- William Alexander Smith R-NC
- Charles A. Stevens R-MA
- James Dale Strawbridge R-PA
- Alexander Wilson Taylor R-PA
- Christopher Thomas R-VA
- Lyman Tremain R-NY
- John L. Vance D-OH
- Jasper D. Ward R-IL
- Marcus Lawrence Ward R-NJ
- Thomas Whitehead D-VA
- William Whiting R-MA
- John M. S. Williams R-MA
- Asa H. Willie D-TX
- Ephraim King Wilson II D-MD
- Joseph G. Wilson R-OR
- Simeon K. Wolfe D-IN
- Stewart L. Woodford R-NY
- John Duncan Young D-KY

== 44th Congress (1875–1877) ==
- Josiah Gardner Abbott D-MA
- Charles Henry Adams R-NY
- Lucien Lester Ainsworth D-IA
- William B. Anderson I-IL
- John C. Bagby D-IL
- Taul Bradford R-AL
- William Ripley Brown R-KS
- Samuel D. Burchard D-WI
- Charles W. Buttz R-SC
- Alexander Campbell R-IL
- Nathan T. Carr D-IN
- George W. Cate R-WI
- Chester W. Chapin D-MA
- Alexander Gilmore Cochran D-PA
- Jacob Pitzer Cowan D-OH
- John M. Davy R-NY
- Rezin A. De Bolt D-MO
- George H. Durand D-MI
- Albert Gallatin Egbert D-PA
- David Dudley Field II D-NY
- Samuel McClary Fite D-TN
- Edwin Flye R-ME
- Rufus S. Frost R-MA
- John R. Goodin D-KS
- Jeremiah Haralson R-AL
- William S. Haymond D-IN
- Benjamin Harvey Hill D-GA
- Andrew Humphreys D-IN
- John Adams Hyman R-NC
- George A. Jenks D-PA
- Edward C. Kehr D-MO
- Winthrop Welles Ketcham R-PA
- Alanson M. Kimball R-WI
- William S. King R-MN
- George Augustus La Dow D-OR
- Franklin Landers D-IN
- Lafayette Lane D-OR
- Elias W. Leavenworth R-NY
- Scott Lord D-NY
- William McFarland D-TN
- John V. Le Moyne D-IL
- William M. Levy D-LA
- Lloyd Lowndes Jr. R-MD
- Henry S. Magoon R-WI
- Edwin R. Meade D-NY
- Henry B. Metcalfe D-NY
- Charles E. Nash R-LA
- Nelson I. Norton R-NY
- Nathaniel H. Odell D-NY
- Edward Y. Parsons D-KY
- Henry B. Payne D-OH
- William Adam Piper D-CA
- Harris M. Plaisted R-ME
- Earley F. Poppleton D-OH
- Allen Potter D-MI
- Joseph Powell D-PA
- John Reilly D-PA
- John S. Savage D-OH
- Julius Hawley Seelye I-MA
- James Sheakley D-PA
- William B. Spencer D-LA
- William Henry Stanton D-PA
- John K. Tarbox D-MA
- Frederick Halstead Teese D-NJ
- Charles Perkins Thompson D-MA
- John Q. Tufts R-IA
- Charles C. B. Walker D-NY
- Ansel T. Walling D-OH
- William W. Warren D-MA
- Guilford Wiley Wells IR-MS
- Richard H. Whiting R-IL
- James D. Williams D-IN
- Alan Wood Jr. R-PA

== 45th Congress (1877–1879) ==
- William J. Bacon R-NY
- Lorenzo Brentano R-IL
- Curtis Hooks Brogden R-NC
- Solomon Bundy R-NY
- Theodore Weld Burdick R-IA
- Nathan Cole R-MO
- Jacob Dolson Cox R-OH
- Henry J. B. Cummings R-IA
- Benjamin Dean D-MA
- Anthony Eickhoff D-NY
- Charles C. Ellsworth R-MI
- William Bennett Fleming D-GA
- Mills Gardner R-OH
- William Willis Garth D-AL
- John Hanna R-IN
- Elizur K. Hart D-NY
- John N. Hungerford R-NY
- Anthony F. Ittner R-MO
- John S. Jones R-OH
- Edwin W. Keightley R-MI
- William Lathrop R-IL
- John E. Leonard R-LA
- Robert F. Ligon D-AL
- Thomas Jefferson Majors R-NE
- Lyne Metcalfe R-MO
- George W. Patterson R-NY
- Thomas M. Patterson D-CO
- Thomas Baldwin Peddie R-NJ
- Henry Moses Pollard R-MO
- Auburn Pridemore D-VA
- John H. Pugh R-NJ
- Terence J. Quinn D-NY
- James Henry Randolph R-TN
- Leonidas Sexton R-IN
- Jacob H. Stewart R-MN
- Joseph Champlin Stone R-IA
- Thomas F. Tipton R-IL
- William D. Veeder D-NY
- Henry Watterson D-KY
- Frank Welch R-NE
- Michael D. White R-IN
- Richard Williams R-OR
- Thomas Wren R-NV
- J. Smith Young D-LA

== 46th Congress (1879–1881) ==
- Reuben Knecht Bachman D-PA
- Hiram Barber Jr. R-IL
- John L. Blake R-NJ
- Bradley Barlow Greenback-VT
- Lewis A. Brigham R-NJ
- Newton Nash Clements D-AL
- Calvin Cowgill R-IN
- Rollin M. Daggett R-NV
- Gilbert De La Matyr Greenback-IN
- Samuel Bernard Dick R-PA
- Edwin Einstein R-NY
- Evarts Worcester Farr R-NH
- John W. Ferdon R-NY
- Albert P. Forsythe Greenback-IL
- Edward H. Gillette Greenback-IA
- Abraham J. Hostetler D-IN
- Noble A. Hull D-FL
- Joseph E. Johnston D-VA
- William H. Kitchin D-NC
- Alfred Morrison Lay D-MO
- William Lounsbery D-NY
- Joseph John Martin R-NC
- William R. Myers D-IN
- John Stoughton Newberry R-MI
- James O'Brien D-NY
- Daniel O'Reilly ID-NY
- James H. Osmer R-PA
- Henry Persons ID-GA
- Ray V. Pierce R-NY
- Henry Poehler D-MN
- James Buchanan Richmond D-VA
- Gideon F. Rothwell D-MO
- Daniel Lindsay Russell R/Greenback-NC
- John Walker Ryon D-PA
- William J. Samford D-AL
- Samuel Locke Sawyer ID-MO
- Hezekiah Bradley Smith D-NJ
- Robert Love Taylor D-TN
- Charles H. Voorhis R-NJ
- James Richard Waddill D-MO
- John Whiteaker D-OR
- Seth Hartman Yocum Greenback-PA

== 47th Congress (1881–1883) ==
- Thomas Allen D-MO
- George Robinson Black D-GA
- Joseph Henry Burrows Greenback-MO
- Andrew Grant Chapman D-MD
- Rufus Dawes R-OH
- John F. Dezendorf D-VA
- Mark L. De Motte R-IN
- Charles T. Doxey R-IN
- P. Henry Dugro D-NY
- Sewall S. Farwell R-IA
- Abram Fulkerson D-VA
- Henry S. Harris D-NJ
- Ira S. Haseltine Greenback-MO
- John B. Hoge D-WV
- Orlando Hubbs R-NC
- Ferris Jacobs Jr. R-NY
- Cornelius Comegys Jadwin R-PA
- Phineas Jones R-NJ
- John P. Leedom D-OH
- John H. Lewis R-IL
- Henry W. Lord R-MI
- James Henry McLean R-MO
- William Robert Moore R-TN
- James Mosgrove Greenback-PA
- Michael N. Nolan D-NY
- Robert B. F. Peirce R-IN
- John B. Rice R-OH
- Theron Moses Rice Greenbacker-MO
- John T. Rich R-MI
- James M. Ritchie R-OH
- John Williams Shackelford D-NC
- Emanuel Shultz R-OH
- Gustavus Sessinghaus R-MO
- Dietrich C. Smith R-IL
- J. Hyatt Smith I-NY
- Oliver L. Spaulding R-MI
- Robert Jarvis Cochran Walker R-PA
- George W. Webber R-MI

== 48th Congress (1883–1885) ==
- Armstead M. Alexander D-MO
- Samuel Myron Brainerd R-PA
- John Bratton D-SC
- Edward Breitung R-MI
- Francis B. Brewer R-NY
- James Broadhead D-MO
- James Budd D-CA
- James Franklin Clay D-KY
- Daniel W. Connolly D-PA
- John Cosgrove D-MO
- George Henry Craig R-AL
- William Wirt Culbertson R-KY
- Nathan F. Dixon III R-RI
- William Dorsheimer D-NY
- Charles T. Doxey R-IN
- William Addison Duncan D-PA
- William W. Eaton D-CT
- Mortimer Fitzland Elliott D-PA
- Reuben Ellwood R-IL
- William E. English D-IN
- Thomas M. Ferrell D-NJ
- William H. F. Fiedler D-NJ
- John F. Finerty ID-IL
- John F. Follett D-OH
- John R. Glascock D-CA
- Alexander Graves D-MO
- Alphonso Hart R-OH
- Herschel H. Hatch R-MI
- Hart Benton Holton R-MD
- Benjamin Stephen Hooper Readjuster-VA
- Julius Houseman D-MI
- Benjamin Franklin Howey R-NJ
- Carleton Hunt D-LA
- Elza Jeffords R-MS
- Burr W. Jones D-WI
- Isaac M. Jordan D-OH
- William Pitt Kellogg R-LA
- John Edward Lamb D-IN
- Edward T. Lewis D-LA
- Theodore Lyman III IR-MA
- Robert Murphy Mayo Readjuster-VA
- John W. McCormick R-OH
- Robert Maynard Murray D-OH
- Thomas P. Ochiltree I-TX
- David R. Paige D-OH
- John Denniston Patton D-PA
- Walter F. Pool R-NC
- George Adams Post D-PA
- Orlando B. Potter D-NY
- Luke Pryor D-AL
- William Henry Mills Pusey D-IA
- William Findlay Rogers D-NY
- Hiram Y. Smith R-IA
- Robert S. Stevens D-NY
- Charles A. Sumner D-CA
- Daniel H. Sumner D-WI
- Pleasant B. Tully D-CA
- Thomas J. Van Alstyne D-NY
- Jonathan H. Wallace D-OH
- Luman Hamlin Weller Greenback-IA
- John Winans D-WI
- Edward Wemple D-NY
- John Sergeant Wise Readjuster-VA
- Thomas Jefferson Wood D-IN
- Gilbert M. Woodward D-WI
- George L. Yaple D-MI
- Tyre York ID-NC

== 49th Congress (1885–1887) ==
- Charles Marley Anderson D-OH
- James Dennis Brady R-VA
- William Hinson Cole D-MD
- Charles C. Comstock D-MI
- Thomas Croxton D-VA
- John W. Daniel D-VA
- William Dawson D-MO
- Nathan F. Dixon III R-RI
- Abraham Dowdney D-NY
- William W. Ellsberry D-OH
- Frederick D. Ely R-MA
- George Washington Fleeger R-PA
- George Ford D-IN
- Benjamin T. Frederick D-IA
- John Gilfillan R-MN
- Robert Stockton Green D-NJ
- John Blackwell Hale D-MO
- Benton Jay Hall D-IA
- Alfred Briggs Irion D-LA
- James Girard Lindsley R-NY
- James A. Louttit R-CA
- Henry Markham R-CA
- John Mason Martin D-AL
- Hugh H. Price R-WI
- Joseph Pulitzer D-NY
- Thomas William Sadler D-AL
- John Swinburne R-NY
- Isaac H. Taylor R-OH
- Zachary Taylor R-TN
- Connally Findlay Trigg D-VA
- Egbert Ludovicus Viele D-NY
- Nathaniel D. Wallace D-LA
- James Hugh Ward D-IL
- Alexander Colwell White R-PA

== 50th Congress (1887–1889) ==
- Albert R. Anderson IR-IA
- George A. Anderson D-IL
- Samuel T. Baird D-LA
- John Robert Brown R-VA
- Lloyd Bryce D-NY
- Edward Burnett D-MA
- George W. Crouse R-OH
- Carlos French D-CT
- William E. Gaines R-VA
- Miles T. Granger D-CT
- Edward W. Greenman D-NY
- Norman Hall D-PA
- Charles E. Hogg D-WV
- Samuel I. Hopkins Labor-VA
- Stephen T. Hopkins R-NY
- Alvin Peterson Hovey R-IN
- Nicholas T. Kane D-NY
- John Lynch D-PA
- John L. MacDonald D-MN
- James Thompson Maffett R-PA
- Welty McCullogh R-PA
- John A. McShane D-NE
- Cherubusco Newton D-LA
- John Nichols I-NC
- Francis B. Posey R-IN
- Edmund Rice D-MN
- Edward White Robertson D-LA
- John E. Russell D-MA
- Henry W. Seymour R-MI
- Furnifold McLendel Simmons D-NC
- Henry Smith Labor-WI
- George M. Thomas R-KY
- Thomas Larkin Thompson D-CA
- Robert J. Vance D-CT
- James Bain White R-IN
- Stephen V. White R-NY
- Thomas Wilson D-MN

== 51st Congress (1889–1891) ==
- George W. Atkinson R-WV
- Charles D. Beckwith R-NJ
- Aaron T. Bliss R-MI
- Thomas H. Carter R-MT
- Thomas J. Clunie D-CA
- Hamilton D. Coleman R-LA
- Solomon Comstock R-MN
- William James Connell R-MO
- Samuel Alfred Craig R-PA
- William Constantine Culbertson R-PA
- John J. De Haven R-CA
- Henry Clay Evans R-TN
- Hamilton G. Ewart R-NC
- Lewis P. Featherstone Labor-AR
- Frank T. Fitzgerald D-NY
- Nathan Frank R-MO
- Oscar S. Gifford R-SD
- Frederic T. Greenhalge R-MA
- Darwin Hall R-MN
- Henry C. Hansbrough R-ND
- Edward R. Hays R-IA
- Charles A. Hill R-IL
- James M. Jackson D-WV
- Harrison Kelley R-KS
- James Kerr D-PA
- William Medcalf Kinsey R-MO
- Charles J. Knapp R-NY
- John Mercer Langston R-VA
- Frederick Lansing R-NY
- Gilbert L. Laws R-NE
- John H. McCarthy D-NY
- Myron H. McCord R-WI
- John Van McDuffie R-AL
- Thomas E. Miller R-SC
- Orren C. Moore R-NH
- Frederick G. Niedringhaus R-MO
- Alonzo Nute R-NH
- John Quinn D-NY
- Joseph Warren Ray R-PA
- Joseph Rea Reed R-IA
- William E. Simonds R-CT
- Charles Brooks Smith R-WV
- Samuel Snider R-MN
- Moses D. Stivers R-NY
- Henry Stockbridge Jr. R-MD
- Willis Sweet R-ID
- Joseph Henry Sweney R-IA
- Charles Champlain Townsend R-PA
- Charles Henry Turner D-NY
- Richard Vaux D-PA
- Edward Carrington Venable D-VA
- Edmund Waddill Jr. R-VA
- Rodney Wallace R-MA
- William C. Wallace R-NY
- Frank W. Wheeler R-MI
- John M. Wiley D-NY
- Robert Henry Whitelaw D-MO

== 52nd Congress (1891–1893) ==
- Lemuel Amerman D-PA
- Edwin Le Roy Antony D-TX
- Clinton Babbitt D-WI
- Joseph H. Beeman D-MS
- Henry Wilbur Bentley D-NY
- David A. Boody D-NY
- Thomas Bowman D-IA
- John Brewer Brown D-MD
- Thomas L. Bunting D-NY
- Samuel T. Busey D-IL
- Allen R. Bushnell D-WI
- Walter Halben Butler D-IA
- Samuel Byrns D-MO
- Benjamin T. Cable D-IL
- James Castle D-MN
- Alfred C. Chapin D-NY
- Benjamin H. Clover Populist-KS
- Isaac N. Cox D-NY
- John Crawford Crosby D-MA
- John T. Cutting R-CA
- Frank P. Coburn D-WI
- Frederick S. Coolidge D-MA
- Alexander Kerr Craig D-PA
- Warren F. Daniell D-NH
- William W. Dixon D-MT
- Robert E. Doan R-OH
- James I. Dungan D-OH
- Robert W. Everett D-GA
- John Rankin Gamble R-SD
- Martin K. Gantz D-OH
- Eugene Pierce Gillespie D-PA
- Levi T. Griffin D-MI
- Edwin Hallowell D-PA
- Kittel Halvorson Populist-MN
- John Taylor Hamilton D-IA
- William H. Harries D-MN
- Sherman Hoar D-MA
- George Johnstone D-SC
- John L. Jolley R-SD
- John W. Kendall D-KY
- John W. Lawson D-VA
- Joseph J. Little D-NY
- John Benjamin Long D-TX
- John James McDannold D-IL
- Edward F. McDonald D-NJ
- Lucas M. Miller D-WI
- John L. Mitchell D-WI
- Walter C. Newberry D-IL
- Lewis P. Ohliger D-OH
- John G. Otis Populist-KS
- Henry Page D-MD
- John M. Pattison D-OH
- David Henry Patton D-IN
- Hosea H. Rockwell D-NY
- Leslie W. Russell R-NY
- Owen Scott D-IL
- John Joseph Seerley D-IA
- George Washington Shonk R-PA
- Herman W. Snow D-IL
- Eli T. Stackhouse D-SC
- Lewis Steward D-IL
- Andrew Stewart R-PA
- Byron G. Stout D-MI
- Vincent A. Taylor R-OH
- George Van Horn D-NY
- John G. Warwick D-OH
- Thomas E. Watson Populist-GA
- Harrison H. Wheeler D-MI
- Frederick Edward White D-IA
- Archibald Hunter Arrington Williams D-NC
- George F. Williams D-MA
- Thomas E. Winn D-GA
- Henry M. Youmans D-MI

== 53rd Congress (1893–1895) ==
- Silas Adams R-KY
- Melvin Baldwin D-MN
- Lyman E. Barnes D-WI
- William M. Beckner D-KY
- John C. Black D-IL
- Haldor Boen Populist-MN
- William H. Bower D-NC
- Robert Franklin Brattan D-MD
- Daniel Dee Burnes D-MO
- Thomas Banks Cabaniss D-GA
- Marion Cannon Populist-CA
- Robert A. Childs R-IL
- Henry A. Coffeen D-WY
- Charles G. Conn D-IN
- Johnston Cornish D-NJ
- William Henry Denson D-AL
- John T. Dunn D-NJ
- Warren B. English D-CA
- William Everett D-MA
- George Bragg Fielder D-NJ
- Benjamin F. Funk R-IL
- Julius Goldzier D-IL
- John H. Graham D-NY
- Walter Gresham D-TX
- Levi T. Griffin D-MI
- Charles Delemere Haines D-NY
- Thomas Hammond D-IN
- Winder Laird Henry D-MD
- Thomas Jefferson Hudson Populist-KS
- William Alexander Harris Populist-KS
- Joseph C. Hendrix D-NY
- Winder Henry D-MD
- William Henry Hines D-PA
- George P. Ikirt D-OH
- James F. Izlar D-SC
- Edwin J. Jorden R-PA
- William Lilly R-PA
- Marcus C. Lisle D-KY
- William V. Lucas R-SD
- James William Marshall D-VA
- Francis Marvin R-NY
- John James McDannold D-IL
- Alexander McDowell R-PA
- Michael J. McEttrick D-MA
- William F. McNagny D-IN
- John W. Moon R-MI
- Horace Ladd Moore D-KS
- Thomas M. Paschal D-TX
- Lafe Pence Populist-CO
- James P. Pigott D-CT
- James A. D. Richards D-OH
- George F. Richardson D-MI
- Byron F. Ritchie D-OH
- William Ryan D-NY
- Simon J. Schermerhorn D-NY
- George B. Shaw R-WI
- Peter J. Somers D-WI
- Isidor Straus D-NY
- Arthur H. Taylor D-IN
- William L. Ward R-NY
- Owen A. Wells D-WI
- Hamilton K. Wheeler R-IL
- William J. White R-OH

== 54th Congress (1895–1897) ==
- Truman H. Aldrich R-AL
- Clarence Emir Allen R-UT
- William Coleman Anderson R-TN
- Harrison Henry Atwood R-MA
- Frank S. Black R-NY
- Richard W. Blue R-KS
- Foster V. Brown R-TN
- Charles F. Buck D-LA
- Orlando Burrell R-IL
- Charles Germman Burton R-MO
- Charles Nelson Clark R-MO
- Samuel A. Cook R-WI
- John Kissig Cowen D-MD
- Miles Crowley D-TX
- George Calhoun Crowther R-MO
- Walter M. Denny D-MS
- Francis B. De Witt R-OH
- Finis E. Downing D-IL
- Tazewell Ellett D-VA
- Albert Taylor Goodwyn Populist-AL
- Frank Hanly R-IN
- Alexander M. Hardy R-IN
- Stephen Ross Harris R-OH
- Frederick Halterman R-PA
- Joseph Johnson Hart D-PA
- Jethro A. Hatch R-IN
- John Kerr Hendrick D-KY
- Nathan T. Hopkins R-KY
- Joel Douglas Hubbard R-MO
- James Hall Huling R-WV
- Samuel C. Hyde R-WA
- Grove L. Johnson R-CA
- Snyder S. Kirkpatrick R-KS
- Fred Churchill Leonard R-PA
- Jacob D. Leighty R-IN
- John Leisenring R-PA
- John W. Lewis R-KY
- James A. Lockhart D-NC
- John E. McCall R-TN
- Richard Cunningham McCormick R-NY
- William Robertson McKenney D-VA
- Joshua Weldon Miles D-MD
- Orrin Larrabee Miller R-KS
- Alfred Milnes R-MI
- Henry C. Miner D-NY
- Norman Adolphus Mozley R-MO
- Everett J. Murphy R-IL
- George H. Noonan R-TX
- William Claiborne Owens D-KY
- Theodore L. Poole R-NY
- Thomas S. Plowman R-AL
- John Henry Raney R-MO
- Frederick Remann R-IL
- John I. Rinaker R-IL
- John G. Shaw D-NC
- James G. Spencer D-MS
- James Alonzo Stahle R-PA
- Charles Phelps Taft R-OH
- Robert J. Tracewell R-IN
- John Plank Tracey R-MO
- William M. Treloar R-MO
- Robert T. Van Horn R-MO
- James J. Walsh D-NY
- David K. Watson R-OH
- George L. Wellington R-MD
- Jonathan S. Willis R-DE
- Benson Wood R-IL
- Charles W. Woodman R-IL
- Charles Henderson Yoakum D-TX

== 55th Congress (1897–1899) ==
- Isaac Ambrose Barber R-MD
- Charles A. Barlow Populist-CA
- Samuel J. Barrows R-MA
- Joseph M. Belford R-NY
- George Jacob Benner D-PA
- Robert N. Bodine D-MO
- William Samuel Booze R-MD
- Jeremiah D. Botkin Populist-KS
- Ferdinand Brucker D-MI
- James R. Campbell D-IL
- Curtis H. Castle Populist-CA
- George M. Davison R-KY
- Charles Dorr R-WV
- John Edgar Fowler Populist-NC
- James Gunn Populist-ID
- William F. L. Hadley R-IL
- L. Irving Handy D-DE
- William H. Hinrichsen D-IL
- William Carey Jones Silver Republican-WA
- John Edward Kelley Populist-SD
- William Sebring Kirkpatrick R-PA
- Freeman Knowles Populist-SD
- J. Hamilton Lewis D-WA
- William F. Love D-MS
- George A. Marshall D-OH
- Samuel Maxwell Populist-NE
- Nelson B. McCormick Populist-KS
- John McDonald R-MD
- William Watson McIntire R-MD
- Daniel W. Mills R-IL
- John Osborne D-WY
- Mason S. Peters Populist-KS
- Thomas S. Plowman D-AL
- John Cirby Sturtevant R-PA
- William V. Sullivan D-MS
- Albert M. Todd D-MI
- John H. G. Vehslage D-NY
- William D. Vincent Populist-KS
- Morgan B. Williams R-PA

== 56th Congress (1899–1901) ==
- John Wilbur Atwater Populist-NC
- Willis J. Bailey R-KS
- Laird Howard Barber D-PA
- Albert J. Campbell D-MT
- William A. Chanler D-NY
- Bertram Tracy Clayton D-NY
- Thomas Cusack D-IL
- William Davis Daly D-NJ
- Stanley Woodward Davenport D-PA
- Jonathan P. Dolliver R-IA
- Romeo H. Freer R-WV
- Athelston Gaston D-PA
- June Ward Gayle D-KY
- Martin H. Glynn D-NY
- John H. Hoffecker R-DE
- Walter O. Hoffecker R-DE
- David Emmons Johnston D-WV
- Josiah Kerr R-MD
- Joseph R. Lane R-IA
- Mitchell May D-NY
- Smith McPherson R-IA
- Edward Thomas Noonan D-IL
- James M. E. O'Grady R-NY
- Fremont O. Phillips R-OH
- Julian Quarles D-VA
- Daniel J. Riordan D-NY
- James Wilfrid Ryan D-PA
- Albert D. Shaw R-NY (Re-elected to 57th Congress, Died. before convening of first session)
- John Walter Smith D-MD
- Joseph Earlston Thropp R-PA
- Oscar Turner D-KY
- John Q. Underhill D-NY
- Russell J. Waters R-CA
- Edward Danner Ziegler D-PA

== 57th Congress (1901–1903) ==
- Henry H. Aplin R-MI
- L. Heisler Ball R-DE
- Oliver Belmont D-NY
- Alexander Billmeyer D-PA
- Henry Bristow R-NY
- Joseph A. Conry D-MA
- Frank Coombs R-CA
- Caldwell Edwards Populist-MT
- John J. Feely D-IL
- De Witt C. Flanagan D-NJ
- Thomas L. Glenn Populist-ID
- Curtis Gregg D-PA
- Harry A. Hanbury R-NY
- Pat Henry D-MS
- Harvey Samuel Irwin R-KY
- Alfred Metcalf Jackson D-KS
- Fred J. Kern D-IL
- Montague Lessler R-NY
- Robert Jacob Lewis R-PA
- J. Ross Mickey D-IL
- James M. Moody R-NC
- J. McKenzie Moss R-KY
- Cornelius Amory Pugsley D-NY
- John N. W. Rumple R-IA
- Charles Reginald Schirm R-MD
- Thomas J. Selby D-IL
- Frederic Storm R-NY
- George Sutherland R-UT
- Edward Swann D-NY
- Emmett Tompkins R-OH
- George Chester Robinson Wagoner R-MO
- James Bamford White D-KY
- Dudley G. Wooten D-TX

== 58th Congress (1903–1905) ==
- De Witt C. Badger D-OH
- Robert Baker D-NY
- Edward Bassett D-NY
- Theodore A. Bell D-CA
- Allan Benny D-NJ
- James W. Brown IR-PA
- George W. Croft D-SC
- Theodore G. Croft D-SC
- Milton J. Daniels R-CA
- Charles Heber Dickerman D-PA
- Martin Emerich D-IL
- Morgan Cassius Fitzpatrick D-TN
- Henry A. Houston D-DE
- George Howell D-PA
- Amos H. Jackson R-OH
- William M. Lanning R-NJ
- Edward J. Livernash D/Union Labor-CA
- Alfred Lucking D-MI
- Norton P. Otis R-NY
- Henry Kirke Porter IR-PA
- Ira E. Rider D-NY
- George Shiras III IR-PA
- Francis Emanuel Shober D-NY
- Joseph Horace Shull D-PA
- George J. Smith R-NY
- Martin Joseph Wade D-IA
- William J. Wynn D-CA

== 59th Congress (1905–1907) ==
- Henry C. Allen R-NJ
- Moses L. Broocks D-TX
- Mounce Gore Butler D-TN
- William Wildman Campbell R-OH
- Thomas Henry Dale R-PA
- Thomas Beall Davis D-WV
- Frank S. Dickson R-IL
- Frank B. Fulkerson R-MO
- Newton W. Gilbert R-IN
- Rockwood Hoar R-MA
- John L. Kennedy R-NE
- Frank B. Klepper R-MO
- Frank J. LeFevre R-NY
- Mial Eben Lilley R-PA
- Anthony Michalek R-IL
- James M. Richardson D-KY
- Zeno J. Rives R-IL
- Edmund W. Samuel R-PA
- Gustav A. Schneebeli R-PA
- Thomas E. Scroggy R-OH
- Cassius M. Shartel R-MO
- Thomas Alexander Smith D-MD
- William T. Tyndall R-MO
- Marshall Van Winkle R-NJ
- John Welborn R-MO
- Charles S. Wharton R-IL
- Ernest E. Wood D-MO

== 60th Congress (1907–1909) ==
- Joseph Grant Beale R-PA
- John Frank Boyd R-NE
- Joseph Davis Brodhead D-PA
- Henry S. Caulfield R-MO
- George W. Cook R-CO
- Elmer L. Fulton D-OK
- Richard N. Hackett D-NC
- Thomas Hackney D-MO
- Warren A. Haggott R-CO
- Philo Hall R-SD
- J. Eugene Harding R-OH
- Daniel W. Hamilton D-IA
- Addison James R-KY
- William P. Kimball D-KY
- J. Ford Laning R-OH
- Eugene W. Leake D-NJ
- John Thomas Lenahan D-PA
- Samuel McMillan R-NY
- James William Murphy D-WI
- William H. Parker R-SD
- Le Gage Pratt D-NJ
- Peter A. Porter IR-NY
- Madison Roswell Smith D-MO
- Oliver C. Wiley D-AL
- Harry Benjamin Wolf D-MD

== 61st Congress (1909–1911) ==
- William O. Barnard R-IN
- James H. Cassidy R-OH
- Charles H. Cowles R-NC
- Charles E. Creager R-OK
- Charles A. Crow R-MO
- Politte Elvins R-MO
- Hamilton Fish II R-NY
- Eugene Foss D-MA
- Alfred Buckwalter Garner R-PA
- Samuel Louis Gilmore D-LA
- John Gaston Grant R-NC
- Thomas Ray Hamer R-ID
- James Havens D-NY
- William Darius Jamieson D-IA
- Adna R. Johnson R-OH
- James Joyce R-OH
- John Kronmiller R-MD
- Robert M. Lively D-TX
- Frederick Lundin R-IL
- Zachary D. Massey R-TN
- William McCredie R-WA
- Charles S. Millington R-NY
- John Motley Morehead II R-NC
- William Moxley R-IL
- Miles Poindexter R-WA
- Charles Clarence Pratt R-PA
- William Paine Sheffield Jr. R-RI
- John K. Tener R-PA
- Richard Young R-NY

== 62nd Congress (1911–1913) ==
- Theron Akin PR-NY
- Steven Beckwith Ayres ID-NY
- Charles Calvin Bowman R-PA
- Theron Ephron Catlin R-MO
- Richard E. Connell D-NY
- George Curry R-NM
- James Alexander Daugherty D-MO
- Henry S. De Forest R-NY
- Lynden Evans D-IL
- Samuel W. Gould D-ME
- Curtis Hussey Gregg D-PA
- John M. Hamilton D-WV
- Robert O. Harris R-MA
- Jesse Lee Hartman R-PA
- Fred S. Jackson R-KS
- Martin W. Littleton D-NY
- Charles Matthews R-PA
- Alexander C. Mitchell R-KS
- Thomas Parran Sr. R-MD
- William C. Redfield D-NY
- Rollin R. Rees R-KS
- William S. Reyburn R-PA
- Peter Moore Speer R-PA
- Edmund J. Stack D-IL
- Edwin F. Sweet D-MI
- John A. Thayer D-MA
- George Utter R-RI
- Stanton Warburton R-WA
- William Wedemeyer R-MI
- Isaac D. Young R-KS

== 63rd Congress (1913–1915) ==
Name	Party	District	Term	Notes
Samuel B. Avis	Republican	West Virginia 3	March 4, 1913 – March 3, 1915	Lost re-election.
J. Thompson Baker	Democratic	New Jersey 2	March 4, 1913 – March 3, 1915	Lost re-election.
William N. Baltz	Democratic	Illinois 22	March 4, 1913 – March 3, 1915	Lost re-election.
Silas Reynolds Barton	Republican	Nebraska 5	March 4, 1913 – March 3, 1915	Lost re-election.
Charles W. Bell	Progressive	California 9	March 4, 1913 – March 3, 1915	Lost re-election.
Charles M. Borchers	Democratic	Illinois 19	March 4, 1913 – March 3, 1915	Lost re-election.
Stanley E. Bowdle	Democratic	Ohio 1	March 4, 1913 – March 3, 1915	Lost re-election.
Robert G. Bremner	Democratic	New Jersey 7	March 4, 1913 – February 5, 1914	Died.
Franklin Brockson	Democratic	Delaware at-large	March 4, 1913 – March 3, 1915	Lost re-election.
Lathrop Brown	Democratic	New York 1	March 4, 1913 – March 3, 1915	Lost re-election.
James W. Bryan	Progressive	Wisconsin at-large	March 4, 1913 – March 3, 1915	Lost re-election.
Jacob A. Cantor	Democratic	New York 20	November 4, 1913 – March 3, 1915	Won special election. Lost election to full term.
Wooda N. Carr	Democratic	Pennsylvania 23	March 4, 1913 – March 3, 1915	Lost re-election.
John R. Clancy	Democratic	New York 35	March 4, 1913 – March 3, 1915	Lost re-election.
Maurice Connolly	Democratic	Iowa 3	March 4, 1913 – March 3, 1915	Retired to run for U.S. Senate.
Frederick Simpson Deitrick	Democratic	Massachusetts 8	March 4, 1913 – March 3, 1915	Lost re-election.
Franklin Lewis Dershem	Democratic	Pennsylvania 17	March 4, 1913 – March 3, 1915	Lost re-election.
Jeremiah Donovan	Democratic	Connecticut 4	March 4, 1913 – March 3, 1915	Lost re-election.
James Walter Elder	Democratic	Louisiana 5	March 4, 1913 – March 3, 1915	Lost re-election.
Jacob Falconer	Progressive	Washington at-large	March 4, 1913 – March 3, 1915	Retired to run for U.S. Senate.
Louis FitzHenry	Democratic	Illinois 17	March 4, 1913 – March 3, 1915	Lost re-election.
Peter G. Gerry	Democratic	Rhode Island 2	March 4, 1913 – March 3, 1915	Lost re-election.
Michael Joseph Gill	Democratic	Missouri 12	March 4, 1913 – March 3, 1915	Lost re-election.
Edward Gilmore	Democratic	Massachusetts 14	March 4, 1913 – March 3, 1915	Retired.
Robert H. Gittins	Democratic	New York 40	March 4, 1913 – March 3, 1915	Lost re-election.
Forrest Goodwin	Republican	Maine 3	March 4, 1913 – May 28, 1913	Died.
George E. Gorman	Democratic	Illinois 3	March 4, 1913 – March 3, 1915	Retired.
Christopher Columbus Harris	Democratic	Alabama 8	May 11, 1914 – March 3, 1915	Won special election. Not a candidate for full term.
William Hinebaugh	Progressive	Illinois 12	March 4, 1913 – March 3, 1915	Lost re-election.
Stephen A. Hoxworth	Democratic	Illinois 15	March 4, 1913 – March 3, 1915	Lost re-election.
Jacob Johnson	Republican	Utah 2	March 4, 1913 – March 3, 1915	Lost renomination
William Kennedy	Democratic	Connecticut 2	March 4, 1913 – March 3, 1915	Lost re-election.
George John Kindel	Democratic	Colorado 1	March 4, 1913 – March 3, 1915	Retired to run for U.S. Senate.
Sanford Kirkpatrick	Democratic	Iowa 6	March 4, 1913 – March 3, 1915	Lost renomination.
Claude L'Engle	Democratic	Florida at-large	March 4, 1913 – March 3, 1915	Lost renomination.
Fred Ewing Lewis	Republican	Pennsylvania at-large	March 4, 1913 – March 3, 1915	Retired.
Francis O. Lindquist	Republican	Michigan 11	March 4, 1913 – March 3, 1915	Retired.
James Washington Logue	Democratic	Pennsylvania 6	March 4, 1913 – March 3, 1915	Lost re-election.
William Josiah MacDonald	Progressive	West Virginia 3	August 26, 1913 – March 3, 1915	Won special election. Lost election to full term.
Bryan F. Mahan	Democratic	Connecticut 2	March 4, 1913 – March 3, 1915	Lost re-election.
James Mahan	Republican	Minnesota at-large	March 4, 1913 – March 3, 1915	Retired
Lewis J. Martin	Democratic	New Jersey 6	March 4, 1913 – May 5, 1913	Died.
George McClellan	Democratic	New York 27	March 4, 1913 – March 3, 1915	Lost re-election.
Herman A. Metz	Democratic	New York 10	March 4, 1913 – March 3, 1915	Retired.
William Oscar Mulkey	Democratic	Alabama 3	June 29, 1914 – March 3, 1915	Won special election. Not a candidate for full term.
James H. O'Brien	Democratic	New York 9	March 4, 1913 – March 3, 1915	Lost re-election.
Frank Trimble O'Hair	Democratic	Illinois 10	March 4, 1913 – March 3, 1915	Lost re-election.
Denis O'Leary	Democratic	New York 2	March 4, 1913 – December 31, 1914	Retired. Resigned early.
John B. Peterson	Democratic	Indiana 10	March 4, 1913 – March 3, 1915	Lost re-election.
Eugene Elliott Reed	Democratic	New Hampshire 1	March 4, 1913 – March 3, 1915	Lost re-election.
Arthur Ringwalt Rupley	Republican	Pennsylvania at-large	March 4, 1913 – March 3, 1915	Retired.
Harry H. Seldomridge	Democratic	Colorado 2	March 4, 1913 – March 3, 1915	Lost re-election.
Frank Owens Smith	Democratic	Maryland 5	March 4, 1913 – March 3, 1915	Lost re-election.
Raymond Bartlett Stevens	Democratic	New Hampshire 2	March 4, 1913 – March 3, 1915	Retired to run for U.S. Senate.
Lawrence B. Stringer	Democratic	Illinois at-large	March 4, 1913 – March 3, 1915	Retired to run for U.S. Senate.
Benjamin I. Taylor	Democratic	New York 25	March 4, 1913 – March 3, 1915	Lost re-election.
Thomas Chandler Thacher	Democratic	Massachusetts 16	March 4, 1913 – March 3, 1915	Lost re-election.
Charles M. Thomson	Progressive	Illinois 10	March 4, 1913 – March 3, 1915	Lost re-election.
Horace Worth Vaughan	Democratic	Texas 1	March 4, 1913 – March 3, 1915	Lost renomination.
Henry Vollmer	Democratic	Iowa 2	February 10, 1914 – March 3, 1915	Won special election. Not a candidate for full term.
Samuel Wallin	Republican	New York 30	March 4, 1913 – March 3, 1915	Retired.
Allan B. Walsh	Democratic	New Jersey 4	March 4, 1913 – March 3, 1915	Lost re-election.
Stanton Warburton	Democratic	Washington 2	March 4, 1913 – March 3, 1915	Lost re-election.
Claude Weaver	Democratic	Oklahoma at-large	March 4, 1913 – March 3, 1915	Lost renomination.

== 64th Congress (1915–1917) ==
Name	Party	District	Term	Notes
C. William Beales	Republican	Pennsylvania 22	March 4, 1915 – March 3, 1917	Retired to run for Pennsylvania State Senate.
Henry S. Benedict	Progressive	California 10	November 6, 1916 – March 3, 1917	Won special election. Withdrew from election for full term.
William B. Charles	Republican	New York 30	March 4, 1915 – March 3, 1917	Retired.
William Henry Coleman	Republican	Pennsylvania 30	March 4, 1915 – March 3, 1917	Lost re-election.
James H. Davis	Democratic	Texas at-large	March 4, 1915 – March 3, 1917	Lost re-election.
Michael F. Farley	Democratic	New York 14	March 4, 1915 – March 3, 1917	Lost re-election.
Robert F. Hopwood	Republican	Pennsylvania 23	March 4, 1915 – March 3, 1917	Lost re-election.
Michael Liebel Jr.	Democratic	Pennsylvania 25	March 4, 1915 – March 3, 1917	Retired.
Nelson E. Matthews	Republican	Ohio 5	March 4, 1915 – March 3, 1917	Lost re-election.
Paul G. McCorkle	Democratic	South Carolina 5	February 21, 1917 – March 3, 1917	Won special election. Not a candidate for full term.
Robert M. McCracken	Republican	Idaho at-large	March 4, 1915 – March 3, 1917	Lost renomination.
Thomas W. Miller	Republican	Delaware at-large	March 4, 1915 – March 3, 1917	Lost re-election.
William C. Mooney	Republican	Ohio 15	March 4, 1915 – March 3, 1917	Lost re-election.
S. Taylor North	Republican	Pennsylvania 27	March 4, 1915 – March 3, 1917	Lost renomination.
Peter Davis Oakley	Republican	Connecticut 1	March 4, 1915 – March 3, 1917	Lost re-election.
Tinsley W. Rucker Jr.	Democratic	Georgia 8	January 11, 1917 – March 3, 1917	Won special election. Not a candidate for full term.
J. Edward Russell	Republican	Ohio 4	March 4, 1915 – March 3, 1917	Lost re-election.
Thomas J. Steele	Democratic	Iowa 11	March 4, 1915 – March 3, 1917	Lost re-election.
Seward H. Williams	Republican	Ohio 14	March 4, 1915 – March 3, 1917	Lost re-election.

== 65th Congress (1917–1919) ==
Name	Party	District	Term	Notes
Mark R. Bacon	Republican	Michigan 2	March 4, 1917 – December 13, 1917	Lost election contest.
Earl Hanley Beshlin	Democratic	Pennsylvania 28	November 6, 1917 – March 3, 1919	Won special election. Lost election to full term.
William F. Birch	Republican	New Jersey 5	November 5, 1918 – March 3, 1919	Won special election. Not a candidate for full term.
Orrin Dubbs Bleakley	Republican	Pennsylvania 28	March 4, 1917 – April 3, 1917	Resigned.
Henry Alden Clark	Republican	Pennsylvania 25	March 4, 1917 – March 3, 1919	Retired.
Daniel Webster Comstock	Republican	Indiana 6	March 4, 1917 – May 19, 1917	Died.
George K. Denton	Democratic	Indiana 1	March 4, 1917 – March 3, 1919	Lost re-election.
Frederick Essen	Republican	Missouri 10	November 5, 1918 – March 3, 1919	Won special election. Not a candidate for full term.
George B. Francis	Republican	New York 18	March 4, 1917 – March 3, 1919	Retired.
Victor Heintz	Republican	Ohio 2	March 4, 1917 – March 3, 1919	Retired.
Walter Kehoe	Democratic	Florida 3	March 4, 1917 – March 3, 1919	Lost re-election.
George R. Lunn	Democratic	New York 30	March 4, 1917 – March 3, 1919	Lost renomination.
Charles Martin	Democratic	Illinois 4	March 4, 1917 – October 28, 1917	Died.
Medill McCormick	Republican	Illinois at-large	March 4, 1917 – March 3, 1919	Retired to run for U.S. Senate.
Daniel C. Oliver	Democratic	New York 23	March 4, 1917 – March 3, 1919	Retired.
Albert F. Polk	Democratic	Delaware at-large	March 4, 1917 – March 3, 1919	Lost re-election.
Bruce F. Sterling	Democratic	Pennsylvania 23	March 4, 1917 – March 3, 1919	Lost re-election.
Thomas W. Templeton	Republican	Pennsylvania 11	March 4, 1917 – March 3, 1919	Retired.
William F. Waldow	Republican	New York 42	March 4, 1917 – March 3, 1919	Lost re-election.
William B. Walton	Democratic	New Mexico at-large	March 4, 1917 – March 3, 1919	Retired to run for U.S. Senate.
James Clifton Wilson	Democratic	Texas 12	March 4, 1917 – March 3, 1919	Won re-election, but did not take seat in next Congress to accept appointment to federal bench.

== 66th Congress (1919–1921) ==
Name	Party	District	Term	Notes
William Noble Andrews	Republican	Maryland 1	March 4, 1919 – March 3, 1921	Lost re-election.
John J. Babka	Democratic	Ohio 21	March 4, 1919 – March 3, 1921	Lost re-election.
Carlos Bee	Democratic	Texas 14	March 4, 1919 – March 3, 1921	Lost renomination.
William Thomas Bland	Democratic	Missouri 5	March 4, 1919 – March 3, 1921	Lost re-election.
Charles R. Evans	Democratic	Nevada at-large	March 4, 1919 – March 3, 1921	Lost re-election.
John W. Harreld	Republican	Oklahoma 5	March 4, 1919 – March 3, 1921	Retired to run for U.S. Senate.
Hugh S. Hersman	Democratic	California 8	March 4, 1919 – March 3, 1921	Lost re-election.
William Henry Hill	Republican	New York 34	March 4, 1919 – March 3, 1921	Retired.
Clyde Roark Hoey	Democratic	North Carolina 9	December 16, 1919 – March 3, 1921	Won special election. Not a candidate for full term.
John B. Johnston	Democratic	New York 5	March 4, 1919 – March 3, 1921	Retired.
John MacCrate	Republican	New York 3	March 4, 1919 – December 30, 1920	Retired to run for New York Supreme Court. Resigned early to assume seat on court.
Edward C. Mann	Democratic	South Carolina 7	March 4, 1919 – March 3, 1921	Lost renomination.
Cornelius Augustine McGlennon	Democratic	New Jersey 8	March 4, 1919 – March 3, 1921	Lost re-election.
Richard F. McKiniry	Democratic	New York 23	March 4, 1919 – March 3, 1921	Lost re-election.
Patrick McLane	Democratic	Pennsylvania 10	March 4, 1919 – February 25, 1921	Lost election contest.
James G. Monahan	Republican	Wisconsin 3	March 4, 1919 – March 3, 1921	Lost renomination.
Herbert Pell	Democratic	New York 17	March 4, 1919 – March 3, 1921	Lost re-election.
Clifford E. Randall	Republican	Wisconsin 1	March 4, 1919 – March 3, 1921	Lost re-election.
Joseph Rowan	Democratic	New York 19	March 4, 1919 – March 3, 1921	Lost renomination.
Frank L. Smith	Republican	Illinois 17	March 4, 1919 – March 3, 1921	Lost re-election.
Charles Swindall	Republican	Oklahoma 8	November 2, 1920 – March 3, 1921	Won special election. Lost election to full term.
King Swope	Republican	Kentucky 8	August 1, 1919 – March 3, 1921	Won special election. Lost nomination to full term.
John Haden Wilson	Democratic	Pennsylvania 22	March 4, 1919 – March 3, 1921	Won special election to start and finish term of incumbent, who died before the convening of the new term. Lost re-election.

== 67th Congress (1921–1923) ==
Name	Party	District	Term	Notes
Martin C. Ansorge	Republican	New York 21	March 4, 1921 – March 3, 1923	Lost re-election.
T. Frank Appleby	Republican	New Jersey 3	March 4, 1921 – March 3, 1923	Lost re-election. (Note: Despite losing in 1922, Appleby did win re-election to the 69th Congress in 1924, but died before retaking his seat.)
William O. Atkeson	Republican	Missouri 6	March 4, 1921 – March 3, 1923	Lost re-election.
Richard Ely Bird	Republican	Kansas 8	March 4, 1921 – March 3, 1923	Lost re-election.
Charles Grosvenor Bond	Republican	New York 8	March 4, 1921 – March 3, 1923	Lost re-election.
Vincent M. Brennan	Republican	Michigan 13	March 4, 1921 – March 3, 1923	Retired.
Joseph Edgar Brown	Republican	Tennessee 3	March 4, 1921 – March 3, 1923	Retired.
Wynne F. Clouse	Republican	Tennessee 4	March 4, 1921 – March 3, 1923	Lost re-election.
George P. Codd	Republican	Michigan 1	March 4, 1921 – March 3, 1923	Retired.
Charles R. Connell	Republican	Pennsylvania 10	March 4, 1921 – September 26, 1922	Died.
Clarence D. Coughlin	Republican	Pennsylvania 11	March 4, 1921 – March 3, 1923	Lost re-election.
William Frankhauser	Republican	Michigan 3	March 4, 1921 – May 9, 1921	Died.
Harry C. Gahn	Republican	Ohio 21	March 4, 1921 – March 3, 1923	Lost re-election.
L. M. Gensman	Republican	Oklahoma 6	March 4, 1921 – March 3, 1923	Lost re-election.
Fred B. Gernerd	Republican	Pennsylvania 13	March 4, 1921 – March 3, 1923	Lost re-election.
Lewis Henry	Republican	New York 37	April 11, 1922 – March 3, 1923	Won special election. Lost renomination for full term.
Manuel Herrick	Republican	Oklahoma 8	March 4, 1921 – March 3, 1923	Lost renomination.
Joseph H. Himes	Republican	Ohio 16	March 4, 1921 – March 3, 1923	Lost re-election.
Michael J. Hogan	Republican	New York 7	March 4, 1921 – March 3, 1923	Lost re-election.
Winnifred Mason Huck	Republican	Illinois at-large	November 7, 1922 – March 3, 1923	Won special election. Not a candidate for full term.
Theodore W. Hukriede	Republican	Missouri 9	March 4, 1921 – March 3, 1923	Lost re-election.
Augustin Reed Humphrey	Republican	Nebraska 6	November 7, 1922 – March 3, 1923	Won special election. Not a candidate for full term.
William Huntington Kirkpatrick	Republican	Pennsylvania 26	March 4, 1921 – March 3, 1923	Lost re-election.
John Kissel	Republican	New York 3	March 4, 1921 – March 3, 1923	Lost re-election.
Ardolph L. Kline	Republican	New York 5	March 4, 1921 – March 3, 1923	Lost re-election.
I. Clinton Kline	Republican	Pennsylvania 16	March 4, 1921 – March 3, 1923	Lost re-election.
C. L. Knight	Republican	Ohio 14	March 4, 1921 – March 3, 1923	Retired to run for Governor of Ohio.
Henry F. Lawrence	Republican	New York 21	March 4, 1921 – March 3, 1923	Lost re-election.
Warren I. Lee	Republican	New York 6	March 4, 1921 – March 3, 1923	Lost re-election.
Robert S. Maloney	Republican	Massachusetts 7	March 4, 1921 – March 3, 1923	Retired.
Washington J. McCormick	Republican	Montana 1	March 4, 1921 – March 3, 1923	Lost re-election.
Frank C. Millspaugh	Republican	Missouri 1	March 4, 1921 – December 5, 1922	Resigned.
Néstor Montoya	Republican	New Mexico at-large	March 4, 1921 – January 13, 1923	Died.
Miner G. Norton	Republican	Ohio 20	March 4, 1921 – March 3, 1923	Lost re-election.
Archibald E. Olpp	Republican	New Jersey 11	March 4, 1921 – March 3, 1923	Lost re-election.
Roscoe C. Patterson	Republican	Missouri 7	March 4, 1921 – March 3, 1923	Lost re-election.
John Paul Jr.	Republican	Virginia 7	December 15, 1922 – March 3, 1923	Won special election. Not a candidate for full term.
Andrew Petersen	Republican	New York 9	March 4, 1921 – March 3, 1923	Lost re-election.
Joseph C. Pringey	Republican	Oklahoma 4	March 4, 1921 – March 3, 1923	Lost re-election.
Alice Mary Robertson	Republican	Oklahoma 2	March 4, 1921 – March 3, 1923	Lost re-election.
Albert B. Rossdale	Republican	New York 23	March 4, 1921 – March 3, 1923	Lost re-election.
Thomas Jefferson Ryan	Republican	New York 15	March 4, 1921 – March 3, 1923	Lost re-election.
Lon A. Scott	Republican	Tennessee 8	March 4, 1921 – March 3, 1923	Lost re-election.
Guy L. Shaw	Republican	Illinois 20	March 4, 1921 – March 3, 1923	Lost re-election.
Samuel A. Shelton	Republican	New York 21	March 4, 1921 – March 3, 1923	Retired.
Chester W. Taylor	Democratic	Arkansas 6	October 25, 1921 – March 3, 1923	Won special election. Not a candidate for full term.
Roy H. Thorpe	Republican	Nebraska 1	November 7, 1922 – March 3, 1923	Won special election. Not a candidate for full term.

== 68th Congress (1923–1925) ==
Name	Party	District	Term	Notes
Robert E. Lee Allen	Democratic	West Virginia 2	March 4, 1923 – March 3, 1925	Lost re-election.
William H. Boyce	Democratic	Delaware at-large	March 4, 1923 – March 3, 1925	Lost re-election.
Charles Browne	Democratic	New Jersey 4	March 4, 1923 – March 3, 1925	Lost re-election.
James R. Buckley	Democratic	Illinois 6	March 4, 1923 – March 3, 1925	Lost re-election.
Samuel E. Cook	Democratic	Indiana 11	March 4, 1923 – March 3, 1925	Lost re-election.
William Martin Croll	Democratic	Pennsylvania 14	March 4, 1923 – March 3, 1925	Lost re-election.
Herbert Wesley Cummings	Democratic	Pennsylvania 17	March 4, 1923 – March 3, 1925	Lost re-election.
Hiram Kinsman Evans	Republican	Iowa 8	June 4, 1923 – March 3, 1925	Won special election. Not a candidate for full term.
Frederick G. Fleetwood	Republican	Vermont 1	March 4, 1923 – March 3, 1925	Retired.
Elmer H. Geran	Democratic	New Jersey 3	March 4, 1923 – March 3, 1925	Lost re-election.
Samuel Feiser Glatfelter	Democratic	Pennsylvania 22	March 4, 1923 – March 3, 1925	Lost re-election.
William Y. Humphreys	Democratic	Mississippi 3	November 27, 1923 – March 3, 1925	Won special election. Not a candidate for full term.
Henry L. Jost	Democratic	Missouri 5	March 4, 1923 – March 3, 1925	Retired.
Robert M. Leach	Republican	Massachusetts 15	November 4, 1923 – March 3, 1925	Won special election. Not a candidate for full term.
Thomas Jefferson Lilly	Democratic	West Virginia 5	March 4, 1923 – March 3, 1925	Lost re-election.
Frank J. McNulty	Democratic	New Jersey 8	March 4, 1923 – March 3, 1925	Lost re-election.
Edward E. Miller	Republican	Illinois 22	March 4, 1923 – March 3, 1925	Retired.
R. Lee Moore	Democratic	Georgia 1	March 4, 1923 – March 3, 1925	Lost renomination.
Joseph W. Morris	Democratic	Kentucky 7	November 30, 1923 – March 3, 1925	Won special election. Not a candidate for full term.
Patrick B. O'Sullivan	Democratic	Connecticut 5	March 4, 1923 – March 3, 1925	Lost re-election.
Charles L. Richards	Democratic	Nevada at-large	March 4, 1923 – March 3, 1925	Lost re-election.
Lewis E. Sawyer	Democratic	Arkansas 6	March 4, 1923 – May 5, 1923	Died.
William C. Salmon	Democratic	Tennessee 7	March 4, 1923 – March 3, 1925	Retired.
Frank Crawford Sites	Democratic	Pennsylvania 19	March 4, 1923 – March 3, 1925	Lost re-election.
Charles I. Stengle	Democratic	New York 6	March 4, 1923 – March 3, 1925	Retired.
Elton Watkins	Democratic	Oregon 3	March 4, 1923 – March 3, 1925	Lost re-election.
George M. Wertz	Democratic	Pennsylvania 20	March 4, 1923 – March 3, 1925	Lost renomination.
William E. Wilson	Democratic	Indiana 1	March 4, 1923 – March 3, 1925	Lost re-election.
J. Scott Wolff	Democratic	Missouri 13	March 4, 1923 – March 3, 1925	Lost re-election.

== 69th Congress (1925–1927) ==
Name	Party	District	Term	Notes
Stewart H. Appleby	Republican	New Jersey 3	November 3, 1925 – March 3, 1927	Won special election. Retired.
Ralph Emerson Bailey	Republican	Missouri 14	March 4, 1925 – March 3, 1927	Retired.
Edmund Nelson Carpenter	Republican	Pennsylvania 12	March 4, 1925 – March 3, 1927	Retired.
George B. Churchill	Republican	Massachusetts 2	March 4, 1925 – July 1, 1925	Died.
Lawrence J. Flaherty	Republican	California 5	March 4, 1925 – June 13, 1926	Died.
Andrew Jackson Kirk	Republican	Pennsylvania 12	February 13, 1926 – March 3, 1927	Won special election. Lost re-nomination for full term.
Chauncey B. Little	Democratic	Kansas 2	March 4, 1925 – March 3, 1927	Lost re-election.
Samuel J. Montgomery	Republican	Oklahoma 1	March 4, 1925 – March 3, 1927	Lost re-election.
John B. Sosnowski	Republican	Michigan 1	March 4, 1925 – March 3, 1927	Lost re-nomination.
Joshua William Swartz	Republican	Pennsylvania 19	March 4, 1925 – March 3, 1927	Retired.
Harry Irving Thayer	Republican	Massachusetts 8	March 4, 1925 – March 10, 1926	Died.
Harold Tolley	Republican	New York 34	March 4, 1925 – March 3, 1927	Retired.

== 70th Congress (1927–1929) ==
Name	Party	District	Term	Notes
Robert Grey Bushong	Republican	Pennsylvania 14	March 4, 1927 – March 3, 1929	Retired.
William W. Cohen	Democratic	New York 17	March 4, 1927 – March 3, 1929	Retired.
George H. Combs Jr.	Democratic	Missouri 5	March 4, 1927 – March 3, 1929	Retired.
Edward T. England	Republican	West Virginia 6	March 4, 1927 – March 3, 1929	Lost re-election.
James M. Hazlett	Republican	Pennsylvania 1	March 4, 1927 – October 20, 1927	Resigned.
Louis Monast	Republican	Rhode Island 3	March 4, 1927 – March 3, 1929	Lost re-election.
Paul J. Moore	Democratic	New Jersey 9	March 4, 1927 – March 3, 1929	Lost re-election.
Henry D. Moorman	Democratic	Kentucky 4	March 4, 1927 – March 3, 1929	Lost re-election.
William Smith O'Brien	Democratic	West Virginia 3	March 4, 1927 – March 3, 1929	Lost re-election.
Cyrus Maffet Palmer	Republican	Pennsylvania 13	March 4, 1927 – March 3, 1929	Lost renomination.
Charles Tatgenhorst Jr.	Republican	Ohio 2	November 8, 1927 – March 3, 1929	Won special election. Not a candidate for full term.
Earl W. Vincent	Republican	Iowa 9	June 4, 1928 – March 3, 1929	Won special election. Lost nomination to full term.
Orie Solomon Ware	Democratic	Kentucky 6	March 4, 1927 – March 3, 1929	Retired.
S. Harrison White	Democratic	Colorado 1	November 15, 1927 – March 3, 1929	Won special election. Lost election to full term.

== 71st Congress (1929–1931) ==
Name	Party	District	Term	Notes
Joseph E. Baird	Republican	Ohio 13	March 4, 1929 – March 3, 1931	Lost re-election.
Robert E. Lee Blackburn	Republican	Kentucky 7	March 4, 1929 – March 3, 1931	Lost re-election.
Linwood Clark	Republican	Maryland 2	March 4, 1929 – March 3, 1931	Lost re-election.
John D. Craddock	Republican	Kentucky 4	March 4, 1929 – March 3, 1931	Lost re-election.
John Lloyd Dorsey Jr.	Democratic	Kentucky 2	March 4, 1929 – March 3, 1931	Retired.
Jacob A. Garber	Republican	Virginia 7	March 4, 1929 – March 3, 1931	Lost re-election.
Thomas Jefferson Halsey	Republican	Missouri 6	March 4, 1929 – March 3, 1931	Lost re-election.
Hinton James	Democratic	North Carolina 7	November 4, 1930 – March 3, 1931	Won special election. Not a candidate for full term.
Charles A. Jonas	Republican	North Carolina 9	March 4, 1929 – March 3, 1931	Lost re-election.
Fred Gustus Johnson	Republican	Nebraska 5	March 4, 1929 – March 3, 1931	Lost re-election.
Rowland Louis Johnston	Republican	Missouri 16	March 4, 1929 – March 3, 1931	Lost re-election.
Will Kirk Kaynor	Republican	Massachusetts 2	March 4, 1929 – December 20, 1929	Died.
Elva R. Kendall	Republican	Kentucky 9	March 4, 1929 – March 3, 1931	Lost re-election.
Robert Quincy Lee	Republican	Texas 17	March 4, 1929 – March 3, 1931	Lost re-election.
Augustus McCloskey	Democratic	Texas 14	March 4, 1929 – February 10, 1930	Lost election contest.
Ruth Hanna McCormick	Republican	Illinois at-large	March 4, 1929 – March 3, 1931	Retired to run for U.S. Senate.
J. Lincoln Newhall	Republican	Kentucky 6	March 4, 1929 – March 3, 1931	Lost re-election.
Charles O'Connor	Republican	Oklahoma 1	March 4, 1929 – March 3, 1931	Lost re-election.
John William Palmer	Republican	Missouri 7	March 4, 1929 – March 3, 1931	Lost re-election.
George M. Pritchard	Republican	North Carolina 10	March 4, 1929 – March 3, 1931	Retired to run for U.S. Senate.
Frank M. Ramey	Republican	Illinois 21	March 4, 1929 – March 3, 1931	Retired.
Charles W. Roark	Republican	Kentucky 3	March 4, 1929 – April 5, 1929	Died.
Joseph Crockett Shaffer	Republican	Virginia 9	March 4, 1929 – March 3, 1931	Lost re-election.
Albert G. Simms	Republican	New Mexico at-large	March 4, 1929 – March 3, 1931	Lost re-election.
Ulysses S. Stone	Republican	Oklahoma 5	March 4, 1929 – March 3, 1931	Lost re-election.
Lewis L. Walker	Republican	Kentucky 8	March 4, 1929 – March 3, 1931	Retired.

== 72nd Congress (1931–1933) ==
Name	Party	District	Term	Notes
Howard M. Baldrige	Republican	Nebraska 2	March 4, 1931 – March 3, 1933	Lost re-election.
William Edward Barton	Democratic	Missouri 16	March 4, 1931 – March 3, 1933	Lost renomination.
Joseph Franklin Biddle	Republican	Pennsylvania 18	March 4, 1931 – March 3, 1933	Retired.
Charles F. Curry Jr.	Republican	California 3	March 4, 1931 – March 3, 1933	Lost re-election.
Robert Lee Davis	Republican	Pennsylvania 6	November 8, 1932 – March 3, 1933	Won special election. Not a candidate for full term.
William H. Dieterich	Democratic	Illinois at-large	March 4, 1931 – March 3, 1933	Retired to run for U.S. Senate.
Willa McCord Blake Eslick	Democratic	Tennessee 7	August 13, 1932 – March 3, 1933	Won special election. Not a candidate for full term.
John W. Fishburne	Democratic	Virginia 7	March 4, 1931 – March 3, 1933	Retired.
Joel West Flood	Democratic	Virginia 10	November 8, 1932 – March 3, 1933	District eliminated in redistricting.
Courtland C. Gillen	Democratic	Indiana 5	March 4, 1931 – March 3, 1933	Lost renomination.
Peter C. Granata	Republican	Illinois 8	March 4, 1931 – April 5, 1932	Lost election contest.
Ralph Horr	Republican	Washington 1	March 4, 1931 – March 3, 1933	Lost renomination.
Robert Davis Johnson	Democratic	Missouri 7	March 4, 1931 – March 3, 1933	Lost renomination.
Charles A. Karch	Democratic	Illinois 22	March 4, 1931 – November 6, 1932	Died.
Norton Lewis Lichtenwalner	Democratic	Pennsylvania 14	March 4, 1931 – March 3, 1933	Lost re-election.
Oscar Lovette	Republican	Tennessee 1	March 4, 1931 – March 3, 1933	Lost renomination.
Carlton Mobley	Democratic	Georgia 6	March 2, 1932 – March 3, 1933	Won special election. Not a candidate for full term.
John H. Overton	Democratic	Louisiana 8	May 12, 1931 – March 3, 1933	Won special election. Retired to run for U.S. Senate.
Donald Partridge	Republican	Maine 2	March 4, 1931 – March 3, 1933	Retired.
Seymour H. Person	Republican	Michigan 6	March 4, 1931 – March 3, 1933	Lost re-election.
Percy Hamilton Stewart	Democratic	New Jersey 5	December 1, 1931 – March 3, 1933	Won special election. Lost election to full term.
Howard William Stull	Republican	Pennsylvania 20	March 4, 1931 – March 3, 1933	Retired.
William L. Tierney	Democratic	Connecticut 4	March 4, 1931 – March 3, 1933	Lost re-election.
John E. Weeks	Republican	Vermont 1	March 4, 1931 – March 3, 1933	District eliminated in redistricting.
Wilbur White	Republican	Ohio 9	March 4, 1931 – March 3, 1933	Lost re-election.

== 73rd Congress (1933–1935) ==
Name	Party	District	Term	Notes
Wilbur L. Adams	Democratic	Delaware at-large	March 4, 1933 – January 3, 1935	Retired to run for U.S. Senate.
Henry M. Arens	Farmer–Labor	Minnesota at-large	March 4, 1933 – January 3, 1935	Lost re-election.
Joseph Weldon Bailey Jr.	Democratic	Texas at-large	March 4, 1933 – January 3, 1935	Retired to run for U.S. Senate.
Charles Montague Bakewell	Republican	Connecticut at-large	March 4, 1933 – January 3, 1935	Lost re-election.
John Y. Brown Sr.	Democratic	Kentucky at-large	March 4, 1933 – January 3, 1935	Retired.
George Washington Blanchard	Republican	Wisconsin 1	March 4, 1933 – January 3, 1935	Retired.
Edward R. Burke	Democratic	Nebraska 2	March 4, 1933 – January 3, 1935	Retired to run for U.S. Senate.
John H. Burke	Democratic	California 18	March 4, 1933 – January 3, 1935	Retired.
Claude E. Cady	Democratic	Michigan 6	March 4, 1933 – January 3, 1935	Lost re-election.
Terry Carpenter	Democratic	Nebraska 5	March 4, 1933 – January 3, 1935	Retired to run for Governor of Nebraska.
Ray P. Chase	Republican	Minnesota at-large	March 4, 1933 – January 3, 1935	Lost renomination when redistricted.
Marian Williams Clarke	Republican	New York 34	December 28, 1933 – January 3, 1935	Withdrew from re-election campaign.
Thomas C. Coffin	Democratic	Idaho 2	March 4, 1933 – June 8, 1934	Died.
George R. Durgan	Democratic	Indiana 2	March 4, 1933 – January 3, 1935	Lost re-election.
Ralph R. Eltse	Republican	California 7	March 4, 1933 – January 3, 1935	Lost re-election.
John Fitzgibbons	Democratic	New York at-large	March 4, 1933 – January 3, 1935	Retired.
George Ernest Foulkes	Democratic	Michigan 4	March 4, 1933 – January 3, 1935	Lost re-election.
Frank Gillespie	Democratic	Illinois 17	March 4, 1933 – January 3, 1935	Lost re-election.
Finley Hamilton	Democratic	Kentucky at-large	March 4, 1933 – January 3, 1935	Retired.
Charles W. Henney	Democratic	Wisconsin 2	March 4, 1933 – January 3, 1935	Lost re-election.
Einar Hoidale	Democratic	Minnesota at-large	March 4, 1933 – January 3, 1935	Retired to run for U.S. Senate.
James F. Hughes	Democratic	Wisconsin 8	March 4, 1933 – January 3, 1935	Retired.
Magnus Johnson	Farmer–Labor	Minnesota at-large	March 4, 1933 – January 3, 1935	Lost re-election.
Frank H. Lee	Democratic	Missouri at-large	March 4, 1933 – January 3, 1935	Lost re-election.
John C. Lehr	Democratic	Michigan 2	March 4, 1933 – January 3, 1935	Lost re-election.
Francis T. Maloney	Democratic	Connecticut 3	March 4, 1933 – January 3, 1935	Retired to run for U.S. Senate.
E. W. Marland	Democratic	Oklahoma 8	March 4, 1933 – January 3, 1935	Retired to run for Governor of Oklahoma.
P. H. Moynihan	Republican	Illinois 2	March 4, 1933 – January 3, 1935	Retired.
Michael Joseph Muldowney	Republican	Pennsylvania 32	March 4, 1933 – January 3, 1935	Lost re-election.
Harry W. Musselwhite	Democratic	Michigan 9	March 4, 1933 – January 3, 1935	Lost re-election.
Walter Nesbit	Democratic	Illinois at-large	March 4, 1933 – January 3, 1935	Lost for renomination.
Kathryn O'Loughlin McCarthy	Democratic	Kansas 6	March 4, 1933 – January 3, 1935	Lost re-election.
James Edward Ruffin	Democratic	Missouri at-large	March 4, 1933 – January 3, 1935	Lost renomination.
Francis Shoemaker	Farmer–Labor	Minnesota at-large	March 4, 1933 – January 3, 1935	Lost re-election as an independent.
James Simpson Jr.	Republican	Illinois 10	March 4, 1933 – January 3, 1935	Lost renomination.
Sterling P. Strong	Democratic	Texas at-large	March 4, 1933 – January 3, 1935	Lost renomination.
Elmer E. Studley	Democratic	New York at-large	March 4, 1933 – January 3, 1935	Retired.
George B. Terrell	Democratic	Texas at-large	March 4, 1933 – January 3, 1935	Retired.
William I. Traeger	Republican	California 15	March 4, 1933 – January 3, 1935	Lost re-election.
John G. Utterback	Democratic	Maine 3	March 4, 1933 – January 3, 1935	Lost re-election.
Alfred M. Waldron	Republican	Pennsylvania 3	March 4, 1933 – January 3, 1935	Retired.
Carl M. Weideman	Democratic	Michigan 14	March 4, 1933 – January 3, 1935	Lost renomination.
Albert C. Willford	Democratic	Iowa 3	March 4, 1933 – January 3, 1935	Lost re-election.

== 74th Congress (1935–1937) ==
Name	Party	District	Term	Notes
Charles E. Dietrich	Democratic	Pennsylvania 15	January 3, 1935 – January 3, 1937	Lost re-election.
Denis J. Driscoll	Democratic	Pennsylvania 20	January 3, 1935 – January 3, 1937	Lost re-election.
James P.B. Duffy	Democratic	New York 38	January 3, 1935 – January 3, 1937	Lost renomination.
Aubert C. Dunn	Democratic	Mississippi 5	January 3, 1935 – January 3, 1937	Retired.
Daniel S. Earhart	Democratic	Ohio at-large	November 3, 1936 – January 3, 1937	Won special election. Not a candidate for full term.
William A. Ekwall	Republican	Oregon 3	January 3, 1935 – January 3, 1937	Lost re-election.
Clare G. Fenerty	Republican	Pennsylvania 3	January 3, 1935 – January 3, 1937	Lost re-election.
Percy Lee Gassaway	Democratic	Oklahoma 4	January 3, 1935 – January 3, 1937	Lost renomination.
Simon M. Hamlin	Democratic	Maine 1	January 3, 1935 – January 3, 1937	Lost re-election.
Peter Francis Hammond	Democratic	Ohio 11	November 3, 1936 – January 3, 1937	Won special election. Not a candidate for full term.
Michael L. Igoe	Democratic	Illinois at-large	January 3, 1935 – June 2, 1935	Resigned.
Henry M. Kimball	Republican	Michigan 3	January 3, 1935 – October 19, 1935	Died.
Joshua B. Lee	Democratic	Oklahoma 5	January 3, 1935 – January 3, 1937	Retired.
Verner Main	Republican	Michigan 3	December 17, 1935 – January 3, 1937	Won special election. Lost nomination to full term.
Harry H. Mason	Democratic	Illinois 21	January 3, 1935 – January 3, 1937	Retired.
Theodore L. Moritz	Democratic	Pennsylvania 15	January 3, 1935 – January 3, 1937	Lost renomination as a Republican. Lost re-election as an Independent.
Theodore L. Moritz	Republican (Note: Moritz ran for the Republican nomination in 1936, and was defeated in the primary.)	Pennsylvania 15	January 3, 1935 – January 3, 1937	Lost renomination as a Republican. Lost re-election as an Independent.
Richard M. Russell	Democratic	Massachusetts 9	January 3, 1935 – January 3, 1937	Lost re-election.
J. George Stewart	Republican	Delaware at-large	January 3, 1935 – January 3, 1937	Lost re-election.
Richard J. Tonry	Democratic	New York 8	January 3, 1935 – January 3, 1937	Lost re-election.
Hubert Utterback	Democratic	Iowa 6	January 3, 1935 – January 3, 1937	Retired to run for U.S. Senate.
William H. Wilson	Republican	Pennsylvania 2	January 3, 1935 – January 3, 1937	Lost re-election.

== 75th Congress (1937–1939) ==
Name	Party	District	Term	Notes
Walter H. Albaugh	Republican	Ohio 4	November 8, 1938 – January 3, 1939	Won special election. Not a candidate for full term.
Arthur W. Aleshire	Democratic	Ohio 7	January 3, 1937 – January 3, 1939	Lost re-election.
William F. Allen	Democratic	Delaware at-large	January 3, 1937 – January 3, 1939	Lost re-election.
Richard Merrill Atkinson	Democratic	Tennessee 5	January 3, 1937 – January 3, 1939	Lost renomination.
John Bernard	Farmer–Labor	Minnesota 8	January 3, 1937 – January 3, 1939	Lost re-election.
Herbert S. Bigelow	Democratic	Ohio 2	January 3, 1937 – January 3, 1939	Lost re-election.
Lewis L. Boyer	Democratic	Illinois 15	January 3, 1937 – January 3, 1939	Lost re-election.
Edwin V. Champion	Democratic	Illinois at-large	January 3, 1937 – January 3, 1939	Retired.
Peter J. De Muth	Democratic	Pennsylvania 30	January 3, 1937 – January 3, 1939	Lost re-election.
Joseph A. Dixon	Democratic	Ohio 1	January 3, 1937 – January 3, 1939	Lost re-election.
Ira W. Drew	Democratic	Pennsylvania 7	January 3, 1937 – January 3, 1939	Lost re-election.
Anthony A. Fleger	Democratic	Ohio 22	January 3, 1937 – January 3, 1939	Lost re-election.
Elizabeth Hawley Gasque	Democratic	South Carolina 6	September 13, 1938 – January 3, 1939	Won special election. Not a candidate for full term.
Norman R. Hamilton	Democratic	Virginia 2	January 3, 1937 – January 3, 1939	Lost renomination.
Nan Wood Honeyman	Democratic	Oregon 3	January 3, 1937 – January 3, 1939	Lost re-election.
Dewey Johnson	Farmer–Labor	Minnesota 5	January 3, 1937 – January 3, 1939	Lost re-election.
George Bradshaw Kelly	Democratic	New York 38	January 3, 1937 – January 3, 1939	Lost re-election.
Lewis M. Long	Democratic	Illinois at-large	January 3, 1937 – January 3, 1939	Lost renomination.
John F. Luecke	Democratic	Michigan 11	January 3, 1937 – January 3, 1939	Lost re-election.
Harold G. Mosier	Democratic	Ohio at-large	January 3, 1937 – January 3, 1939	Lost renomination.
Jerry J. O'Connell	Democratic	Montana 1	January 3, 1937 – January 3, 1939	Lost re-election.
Edward L. O'Neill	Democratic	New Jersey 11	January 3, 1937 – January 3, 1939	Lost re-election.
Alfred N. Phillips	Democratic	Connecticut 4	January 3, 1937 – January 3, 1939	Lost re-election.
Hugh M. Rigney	Democratic	Illinois 19	January 3, 1937 – January 3, 1939	Lost re-election.
Alphonse Roy	Democratic	New Hampshire 1	June 9, 1938 – January 3, 1939	Won special election. Lost election to the full term.
Gomer Griffith Smith	Democratic	Oklahoma 5	December 10, 1937 – January 3, 1939	Won special election. Retired to run for U.S. Senate.
Guy J. Swope	Democratic	Pennsylvania 19	January 3, 1937 – January 3, 1939	Lost re-election.
Henry Teigan	Farmer–Labor	Minnesota 3	January 3, 1937 – January 3, 1939	Lost re-election.
Frank William Towey Jr.	Democratic	New Jersey 12	January 3, 1937 – January 3, 1939	Lost re-election.
Andrew J. Transue	Democratic	Michigan 6	January 3, 1937 – January 3, 1939	Lost re-election.

== 76th Congress (1939–1941) ==
Name	Party	District	Term	Notes
John G. Alexander	Republican	Minnesota 3	January 3, 1939 – January 3, 1941	Lost renomination.
Albert E. Austin	Republican	Connecticut 4	January 3, 1939 – January 3, 1941	Lost re-election.
Thomas R. Ball	Republican	Connecticut 2	January 3, 1939 – January 3, 1941	Lost re-election.
William E. Burney	Democratic	Colorado 3	November 5, 1940 – January 3, 1941	Won special election. Not a candidate for full term.
Joseph W. Byrns Jr.	Democratic	Tennessee 5	January 3, 1939 – January 3, 1941	Lost re-election.
Thomas M. Eaton	Republican	California 18	January 3, 1939 – September 16, 1939	Died.
Morris Michael Edelstein	Democratic	New York 14	February 6, 1940 – June 4, 1941 (Note: Edelstein was re-elected to the 77th Congress, but died early in that term. He is included as he served less than two years total in Congress, and he is included in this section as the majority of his tenure took place during the 76th Congress.)	Won special election. Died.
Fred C. Gartner	Republican	Pennsylvania 5	January 3, 1939 – January 3, 1941	Lost re-election.
Florence Reville Gibbs	Democratic	Georgia 8	October 1, 1940 – January 3, 1941	Won special election. Not a candidate for full term.
W. Benjamin Gibbs	Democratic	Georgia 8	January 3, 1939 – August 7, 1940	Died.
Robert K. Goodwin	Republican	Iowa 6	March 5, 1940 – January 3, 1941	Won special election. Not a candidate for full term.
Harry W. Griswold	Republican	Wisconsin 3	January 3, 1939 – July 4, 1939	Died.
J. Francis Harter	Republican	New York 41	January 3, 1939 – January 3, 1941	Lost re-election.
Charles Hawks Jr.	Republican	Wisconsin 2	January 3, 1939 – January 3, 1941	Lost re-election.
George H. Heinke	Republican	Nebraska 1	January 3, 1939 – January 2, 1940	Died.
Frank O. Horton	Republican	Wyoming at-large	January 3, 1939 – January 3, 1941	Lost re-election.
Walter S. Jeffries	Republican	New Jersey 2	January 3, 1939 – January 3, 1941	Lost re-election.
L. L. Marshall	Republican	Ohio at-large	January 3, 1939 – January 3, 1941	Lost re-election.
John C. Martin	Democratic	Illinois at-large	January 3, 1939 – January 3, 1941	Retired.
Clara G. McMillan	Democratic	South Carolina 1	November 7, 1939 – January 3, 1941	Won special election. Not a candidate for full term.
Wallace E. Pierce	Republican	New York 31	January 3, 1939 – January 3, 1940	Died.
Harry N. Routzohn	Republican	Ohio 3	January 3, 1939 – January 3, 1941	Lost re-election.
Harry Sandager	Republican	Rhode Island 2	January 3, 1939 – January 3, 1941	Lost re-election.
James Seccombe	Republican	Ohio 16	January 3, 1939 – January 3, 1941	Lost re-election.
Thomas Vernor Smith	Democratic	Illinois at-large	January 3, 1939 – January 3, 1941	Lost re-election.
John Hyde Sweet	Republican	Nebraska 1	April 19, 1940 – January 3, 1941	Won special election. Not a candidate for full term.
Jacob Thorkelson	Republican	Montana 1	January 3, 1939 – January 3, 1941	Lost renomination.
Zadoc L. Weatherford	Democratic	Alabama 7	November 5, 1940 – January 3, 1941	Won special election. Not a candidate for full term.
George S. Williams	Republican	Delaware at-large	January 3, 1939 – January 3, 1941	Lost re-election.

== 77th Congress (1941–1943) ==
Name	Party	District	Term	Notes
Walter W. Bankhead	Democratic	Alabama 7	January 3, 1941 – February 1, 1941	Resigned.
Philip Allen Bennett	Republican	Missouri 6	January 3, 1941 – December 7, 1942	Re-elected but died before start of second term.
Veronica Grace Boland	Democratic	Pennsylvania 11	November 3, 1942 – January 3, 1943	Won special election. Not a candidate for full term.
Katharine Byron	Democratic	Maryland 6	May 27, 1941 – January 3, 1943	Won special election. Not a candidate for full term.
Oren S. Copeland	Republican	Nebraska 1	January 3, 1941 – January 3, 1943	Lost renomination.
Jacob E. Davis	Democratic	Ohio 6	January 3, 1941 – January 3, 1943	Lost re-election.
Le Roy D. Downs	Democratic	Connecticut 4	January 3, 1941 – January 3, 1943	Lost re-election.
Thomas H. Eliot	Democratic	Massachusetts 9	January 3, 1941 – January 3, 1943	Lost renomination.
Greg J. Holbrock	Democratic	Ohio 3	January 3, 1941 – January 3, 1943	Lost re-election.
Lucien J. Maciora	Democratic	Connecticut at-large	January 3, 1941 – January 3, 1943	Lost re-election.
John J. McIntyre	Democratic	Wyoming at-large	January 3, 1941 – January 3, 1943	Lost re-election.
John Ambrose Meyer	Democratic	Maryland 4	January 3, 1941 – January 3, 1943	Lost renomination.
Harry E. Narey	Republican	Iowa 9	November 16, 1942 – January 3, 1943	Won special election. District eliminated in redistricting.
George A. Paddock	Republican	Illinois 10	January 3, 1941 – January 3, 1943	Lost renomination.
William T. Pheiffer	Republican	New York 16	January 3, 1941 – January 3, 1943	Lost re-election.
Vance Plauché	Democratic	Louisiana 7	January 3, 1941 – January 3, 1943	Retired.
Kenneth F. Simpson	Republican	New York 17	January 3, 1941 – January 25, 1941	Died.
Francis R. Smith	Democratic	Pennsylvania 5	January 3, 1941 – January 3, 1943	Lost re-election.

== 78th Congress (1943–1945) ==
Name	Party	District	Term	Notes
Thomas F. Burchill	Democratic	New York 15	January 3, 1943 – January 3, 1945	Retired.
Chester O. Carrier	Republican	Kentucky 4	November 30, 1943 – January 3, 1945	Won special election. Lost election to full term.
Ranulf Compton	Republican	Connecticut 3	January 3, 1943 – January 3, 1945	Lost re-election.
LaVern Dilweg	Democratic	Wisconsin 8	January 3, 1943 – January 3, 1945	Lost re-election.
William P. Elmer	Republican	Missouri 8	January 3, 1943 – January 3, 1945	Lost re-election.
Daniel Ellison	Republican	Maryland 4	January 3, 1943 – January 3, 1945	Lost re-election.
J. William Fulbright	Democratic	Arkansas 3	January 3, 1943 – January 3, 1945	Retired to run for U.S. Senate.
Willa L. Fulmer	Democratic	South Carolina 2	November 7, 1944 – January 3, 1945	Won special election. Not a candidate for full term.
Grant Furlong	Democratic	Pennsylvania 25	November 7, 1944 – January 3, 1945	Won special election. Lost election to full term.
Harry P. Jeffrey	Republican	Ohio 3	January 3, 1943 – January 3, 1945	Lost re-election.
Calvin D. Johnson	Republican	Illinois 22	January 3, 1943 – January 3, 1945	Lost re-election.
Jim Nance McCord	Democratic	Tennessee 5	January 3, 1943 – January 3, 1945	Retired to run for Governor of Tennessee.
Howard J. McMurray	Democratic	Wisconsin 5	January 3, 1943 – January 3, 1945	Retired to run for U.S. Senate.
John D. McWilliams	Republican	Connecticut 2	January 3, 1943 – January 3, 1945	Lost re-election.
Louis E. Miller	Republican	Missouri 11	January 3, 1943 – January 3, 1945	Lost re-election.
Cameron A. Morrison	Democratic	North Carolina 10	January 3, 1943 – January 3, 1945	Lost renomination.
Joseph Mruk	Republican	New York 41	January 3, 1943 – January 3, 1945	Lost renomination.
John P. Newsome	Democratic	Alabama 9	January 3, 1943 – January 3, 1945	Lost renomination.
C. Frederick Pracht	Republican	Pennsylvania 5	January 3, 1943 – January 3, 1945	Lost re-election.
Joseph Marmaduke Pratt	Republican	Pennsylvania 2	January 18, 1944 – January 3, 1945	Won special election Lost election to full term.
Will Rogers Jr.	Democratic	California 16	January 3, 1943 – May 23, 1944	Resigned to enter service in the US Army.
Edmund Rowe	Republican	Ohio 14	January 3, 1943 – January 3, 1945	Lost re-election.
Winifred C. Stanley	Republican	New York at-large	January 3, 1943 – January 3, 1945	Retired.
Maurice J. Sullivan	Democratic	Nevada at-large	January 3, 1943 – January 3, 1945	Lost renomination.
William I. Troutman	Republican	Pennsylvania at-large	January 3, 1943 – January 2, 1945	Won re-election, but resigned before new term started.
Earle D. Willey	Republican	Delaware at-large	January 3, 1943 – January 3, 1945	Lost re-election.

== 79th Congress (1945–1947) ==
Name	Party	District	Term	Notes
Sherman Adams	Republican	New Hampshire 2	January 3, 1945 – January 3, 1947	Retired to run for Governor of New Hampshire.
Augustus W. Bennet	Republican	New York 29	January 3, 1945 – January 3, 1947	Lost renomination.
Berkeley L. Bunker	Democratic	Nevada at-large	January 3, 1945 – January 3, 1947	Retired to run for U.S. Senate.
Howard E. Campbell	Republican	Pennsylvania 29	January 3, 1945 – January 3, 1947	Lost renomination.
Hugh De Lacy	Democratic	Washington 1	January 3, 1945 – January 3, 1947	Lost re-election.
Emily Taft Douglas	Democratic	Illinois at-large	January 3, 1945 – January 3, 1947	Lost re-election.
Harold Earthman	Democratic	Tennessee 5	January 3, 1945 – January 3, 1947	Lost renomination.
Joseph Wilson Ervin	Democratic	North Carolina 10	January 3, 1945 – December 25, 1945	Died.
Sam Ervin	Democratic	North Carolina 10	January 22, 1946 – January 3, 1947	Won special election. Not a candidate for full term.
William Gallagher	Democratic	Minnesota 3	January 3, 1945 – August 13, 1946	Died.
Edward Joseph Gardner	Democratic	Ohio 3	January 3, 1945 – January 3, 1947	Lost re-election.
James P. Geelan	Democratic	Connecticut 3	January 3, 1945 – January 3, 1947	Lost re-election.
Ned R. Healy	Democratic	California 13	January 3, 1945 – January 3, 1947	Lost re-election.
Robert Kirkland Henry	Republican	Wisconsin 2	January 3, 1945 – November 20, 1946	Re-elected, but died before start of second term.
Carl Henry Hoffman	Republican	Pennsylvania 23	January 3, 1945 – January 3, 1947	Retired.
William W. Link	Democratic	Illinois 7	January 3, 1945 – January 3, 1947	Lost re-election.
Helen Douglas Mankin	Democratic	Georgia 5	February 12, 1946 – January 3, 1947	Won special election. Lost renomination. Lost re-election as a write-in.
Herbert J. McGlinchey	Democratic	Pennsylvania 6	January 3, 1945 – January 3, 1947	Lost re-election.
Eliza Jane Pratt	Democratic	North Carolina 8	May 25, 1946 – January 3, 1947	Won special election. Not a candidate for full term.
Ellis E. Patterson	Democratic	California 16	January 3, 1945 – January 3, 1947	Retired to run for U.S. Senate.
Peter A. Quinn	Democratic	New York 26	January 3, 1945 – January 3, 1947	Lost re-election.
Alexander J. Resa	Democratic	Illinois 9	January 3, 1945 – January 3, 1947	Lost re-election.
Dudley Roe	Democratic	Maryland 1	January 3, 1945 – January 3, 1947	Lost re-election.
James A. Roe	Democratic	New York 5	January 3, 1945 – January 3, 1947	Lost re-election.
George F. Rogers	Democratic	New York 40	January 3, 1945 – January 3, 1947	Lost re-election.
Joseph F. Ryter	Democratic	Connecticut at-large	January 3, 1945 – January 3, 1947	Lost re-election.
Charles R. Savage	Democratic	Washington 3	January 3, 1945 – January 3, 1947	Lost re-election.
Edgar A. Sharp	Democratic	New York 1	January 3, 1945 – January 3, 1947	Retired.
Frank Starkey	Democratic	Minnesota 4	January 3, 1945 – January 3, 1947	Lost re-election.

== 80th Congress (1947–1949) ==
Name	Party	District	Term	Notes
Parke M. Banta	Republican	Missouri 8	January 3, 1947 – January 3, 1949	Lost re-election.
Willis W. Bradley	Republican	California 18	January 3, 1947 – January 3, 1949	Lost re-election.
John C. Brophy	Republican	Wisconsin 4	January 3, 1947 – January 3, 1949	Lost re-election.
Raymond H. Burke	Republican	Ohio 3	January 3, 1947 – January 3, 1949	Lost re-election.
E. Wallace Chadwick	Republican	Pennsylvania 7	January 3, 1947 – January 3, 1949	Lost re-election.
Howard A. Coffin	Republican	Michigan 13	January 3, 1947 – January 3, 1949	Lost re-election.
William J. Crow	Republican	Pennsylvania 23	January 3, 1947 – January 3, 1949	Lost re-election.
Edward Devitt	Republican	Minnesota 4	January 3, 1947 – January 3, 1949	Lost re-election.
Charles K. Fletcher	Republican	California 23	January 3, 1947 – January 3, 1949	Lost re-election.
Ellsworth Foote	Republican	Connecticut 3	January 3, 1947 – January 3, 1949	Lost re-election.
Abe Goff	Republican	Idaho 1	January 3, 1947 – January 3, 1949	Lost re-election.
Leo Isacson	American Labor	New York 24	February 17, 1948 – January 3, 1949	Won special election. Lost election to full term.
Mitchell Jenkins	Republican	Pennsylvania 11	January 3, 1947 – January 3, 1949	Retired.
Glen D. Johnson	Democratic	Oklahoma 4	January 3, 1947 – January 3, 1949	Lost renomination.
Homer Jones	Republican	Washington 1	January 3, 1947 – January 3, 1949	Lost re-election.
William Lewis	Republican	Kentucky 9	April 24, 1948 – January 3, 1949	Won special election. Not a candidate for full term.
Francis J. Love	Republican	West Virginia 1	January 3, 1947 – January 3, 1949	Lost re-election.
Georgia Lee Lusk	Democratic	New Mexico at-large	January 3, 1947 – January 3, 1949	Lost renomination.
George MacKinnon	Republican	Minnesota 3	January 3, 1947 – January 3, 1949	Lost re-election.
Franklin J. Maloney	Republican	Pennsylvania 4	January 3, 1947 – January 3, 1949	Lost re-election.
Robert N. McGarvey	Republican	Pennsylvania 2	January 3, 1947 – January 3, 1949	Lost re-election.
Gregory McMahon	Republican	New York 4	January 3, 1947 – January 3, 1949	Lost re-election.
Hugh Meade	Democratic	Maryland 2	January 3, 1947 – January 3, 1949	Lost re-election.
Wendell H. Meade	Republican	Kentucky 7	January 3, 1947 – January 3, 1949	Lost re-election.
E. A. Mitchell	Republican	Indiana 8	January 3, 1947 – January 3, 1949	Lost re-election.
Frederick Augustus Muhlenberg	Republican	Pennsylvania 13	January 3, 1947 – January 3, 1949	Lost re-election.
Robert Nodar Jr.	Republican	New York 6	January 3, 1947 – January 3, 1949	Lost re-election.
Thomas L. Owens	Republican	Illinois 7	January 3, 1947 – June 7, 1948	Died.
Preston E. Peden	Democratic	Oklahoma 7	January 3, 1947 – January 3, 1949	Lost renomination.
David M. Potts	Republican	New York 26	January 3, 1947 – January 3, 1949	Lost re-election.
Albert L. Reeves Jr.	Republican	Missouri 5	January 3, 1947 – January 3, 1949	Lost re-election.
Charles H. Russell	Republican	Nevada at-large	January 3, 1947 – January 3, 1949	Lost re-election.
George W. Sarbacher Jr.	Republican	Pennsylvania 5	January 3, 1947 – January 3, 1949	Lost re-election.
Melvin C. Snyder	Republican	West Virginia 2	January 3, 1947 – January 3, 1949	Lost re-election.
Robert Twyman	Republican	Illinois 9	January 3, 1947 – January 3, 1949	Lost re-election.
Harold F. Youngblood	Republican	Michigan 14	January 3, 1947 – January 3, 1949	Lost re-election.

== 81st Congress (1949–1951) ==
Name	Party	District	Term	Notes
William P. Bolton	Democratic	Maryland 2	January 3, 1949 – January 3, 1951	Lost re-election.
James V. Buckley	Democratic	Illinois 4	January 3, 1949 – January 3, 1951	Lost re-election.
Thomas Henry Burke	Democratic	Ohio 9	January 3, 1949 – January 3, 1951	Lost renomination.
Anthony Cavalcante	Democratic	Pennsylvania 23	January 3, 1949 – January 3, 1951	Lost re-election.
Chester A. Chesney	Democratic	Illinois 11	January 3, 1949 – January 3, 1951	Lost re-election.
Robert L. Coffey	Democratic	Pennsylvania 26	January 3, 1949 – April 20, 1949	Died.
Thurman C. Crook	Democratic	Indiana 3	January 3, 1949 – January 3, 1951	Lost re-election.
Harry J. Davenport	Democratic	Pennsylvania 29	January 3, 1949 – January 3, 1951	Lost re-election.
John C. Davies II	Democratic	New York 35	January 3, 1949 – January 3, 1951	Lost re-election.
Dixie Gilmer	Democratic	Oklahoma 1	January 3, 1949 – January 3, 1951	Lost re-election.
Chester C. Gorski	Democratic	New York 44	January 3, 1949 – January 3, 1951	Lost re-election.
Ben H. Guill	Republican	Texas 18	May 6, 1950 – January 3, 1951	Won special election. Lost election to full term.
James Butler Hare	Democratic	South Carolina 3	January 3, 1949 – January 3, 1951	Lost renomination.
Andrew Jacobs Sr.	Democratic	Indiana 11	January 3, 1949 – January 3, 1951	Lost re-election.
Raymond W. Karst	Democratic	Missouri 12	January 3, 1949 – January 3, 1951	Lost re-election.
Edward H. Kruse	Democratic	Indiana 4	January 3, 1949 – January 3, 1951	Lost re-election.
Neil J. Linehan	Democratic	Illinois 3	January 3, 1949 – January 3, 1951	Lost re-election.
John H. Marsalis	Democratic	Colorado 3	January 3, 1949 – January 3, 1951	Lost re-election.
John E. Miles	Democratic	New Mexico at-large	January 3, 1949 – January 3, 1951	Retired.
James Ellsworth Noland	Democratic	Indiana 7	January 3, 1949 – January 3, 1951	Lost re-election.
Eugene D. O'Sullivan	Democratic	Nebraska 2	January 3, 1949 – January 3, 1951	Lost re-election.
William L. Pfeiffer	Republican	New York 44	January 3, 1949 – January 3, 1951	Retired.
Hugo S. Sims Jr.	Democratic	South Carolina 2	January 3, 1949 – January 3, 1951	Lost renomination.
Anthony F. Tauriello	Democratic	New York 43	January 3, 1949 – January 3, 1951	Lost re-election.
Earl T. Wagner	Democratic	Ohio 2	January 3, 1949 – January 3, 1951	Lost re-election.
John R. Walsh	Democratic	Indiana 5	January 3, 1949 – January 3, 1951	Lost re-election.
Cecil F. White	Democratic	California 9	January 3, 1949 – January 3, 1951	Lost re-election.
George H. Wilson	Democratic	Oklahoma 8	January 3, 1949 – January 3, 1951	Lost re-election.

== 82nd Congress (1951–1953) ==
Name	Party	District	Term	Notes
Fred G. Aandahl	Republican	North Dakota at-large	January 3, 1951 – January 3, 1953	Retired.
Orland K. Armstrong	Republican	Missouri 6	January 3, 1951 – January 3, 1953	Retired.
Harmar D. Denny Jr.	Republican	Pennsylvania 29	January 3, 1951 – January 3, 1953	Redistricted to the 28th district. Lost re-election in new district.
Ernest Greenwood	Democratic	New York 1	January 3, 1951 – January 3, 1953	Lost re-election.
Chester B. McMullen	Democratic	Florida 1	January 3, 1951 – January 3, 1953	Retired.
Edward L. Sittler Jr.	Republican	Pennsylvania 23	January 3, 1951 – January 3, 1953	Redistricted to the 26th district. Lost re-election in new district.
Albert C. Vaughn	Republican	Pennsylvania 8	January 3, 1951 – September 1, 1951	Died.
John Travers Wood	Republican	Idaho 1	January 3, 1951 – January 3, 1953	Lost re-election.

== 83rd Congress (1953–1955) ==
Name	Party	District	Term	Notes
Edward Bonin	Republican	Pennsylvania 11	January 3, 1953 – January 3, 1955	Lost re-election.
Courtney W. Campbell	Democratic	Florida 1	January 3, 1953 – January 3, 1955	Lost re-election.
Kit Clardy	Republican	Michigan 6	January 3, 1953 – January 3, 1955	Lost re-election.
Robert Condon	Democratic	California 6	January 3, 1953 – January 3, 1955	Lost re-election.
Jeffrey Paul Hillelson	Republican	Missouri 4	January 3, 1953 – January 3, 1955	Lost re-election.
Roman Hruska	Republican	Nebraska 2	January 3, 1953 – November 8, 1954	Retired to run for U.S. Senate. Resigned early to take seat in Senate.
D. Bailey Merrill	Republican	Indiana 8	January 3, 1953 – January 3, 1955	Lost re-election.
Howard Shultz Miller	Democratic	Kansas 1	January 3, 1953 – January 3, 1955	Lost re-election.
Charles G. Oakman	Republican	Michigan 17	January 3, 1953 – January 3, 1955	Lost re-election.
Frank Small Jr.	Republican	Maryland 5	January 3, 1953 – January 3, 1955	Lost re-election.
Douglas R. Stringfellow	Republican	Utah 1	January 3, 1953 – January 3, 1955	Removed from ballot.
Herbert Warburton	Republican	Delaware at-large	January 3, 1953 – January 3, 1955	Lost re-election.

== 84th Congress (1955–1957) ==
Name	Party	District	Term	Notes
John J. Bell	Democratic	Texas 14	January 3, 1955 – January 3, 1957	Lost renomination.
Jackson B. Chase	Republican	Nebraska 2	January 3, 1955 – January 3, 1957	Retired to run for the Nebraska Supreme Court.
Irwin D. Davidson	Democratic– Liberal	New York 20	January 3, 1955 – December 31, 1956	Retired to run for Court of General Sessions for New York County. Resigned early to take his seat on the Court
Orvin B. Fjare	Republican	Montana 2	January 3, 1955 – January 3, 1957	Lost re-election.
Donald Hayworth	Democratic	Michigan 6	January 3, 1955 – January 3, 1957	Lost re-election.
James C. Murray	Democratic	Illinois 3	January 3, 1955 – January 3, 1957	Lost re-election.
T. James Tumulty	Democratic	New Jersey 14	January 3, 1955 – January 3, 1957	Lost re-election.

== 85th Congress (1957–1959) ==
Name	Party	District	Term	Notes
Emmet Byrne	Republican	Illinois 3	January 3, 1957 – January 3, 1959	Lost re-election.
Vincent J. Dellay	Republican	New Jersey 14	January 3, 1957 – January 3, 1959	Lost re-election as an independent.
Vincent J. Dellay	Democratic (Note: Dellay left the Republican caucus in 1957, and began caucusing with the Democrats.)	New Jersey 14	January 3, 1957 – January 3, 1959	Lost re-election as an independent.
David S. Dennison Jr.	Republican	Ohio 11	January 3, 1957 – January 3, 1959	Lost re-election.
Harry G. Haskell Jr.	Republican	Delaware at-large	January 3, 1957 – January 3, 1959	Lost re-election.
Russell W. Keeney	Republican	Illinois 14	January 3, 1957 – January 11, 1958	Died.
F. Jay Nimtz	Republican	Indiana 3	January 3, 1957 – January 3, 1959	Lost re-election.
Edwin H. May Jr.	Republican	Connecticut 1	January 3, 1957 – January 3, 1959	Lost re-election.
Robert J. McIntosh	Republican	Michigan 7	January 3, 1957 – January 3, 1959	Lost re-election.
Donald Edgar Tewes	Republican	Wisconsin 2	January 3, 1957 – January 3, 1959	Lost re-election.

== 86th Congress (1959–1961) ==
Name	Party	District	Term	Notes
Joseph W. Barr	Democratic	Indiana 11	January 3, 1959 – January 3, 1961	Lost re-election.
Chester Bowles	Democratic	Connecticut 2	January 3, 1959 – January 3, 1961	Lost re-election.
Lawrence Brock	Democratic	Nebraska 3	January 3, 1959 – January 3, 1961	Lost re-election.
Quentin Burdick	Democratic	North Dakota at-large	January 3, 1959 – August 8, 1960	Resigned after election to the U.S. Senate.
Steven V. Carter	Democratic	Iowa 4	January 3, 1959 – November 4, 1959	Died.
Douglas Hemphill Elliott	Republican	Pennsylvania 18	April 3, 1960 – June 19, 1960	Won special election. Died.
Gerald T. Flynn	Democratic	Wisconsin 1	January 3, 1959 – January 3, 1961	Lost re-election.
John R. Foley	Democratic	Maryland 6	January 3, 1959 – January 3, 1961	Lost re-election.
Newell A. George	Democratic	Kansas 2	January 3, 1959 – January 3, 1961	Lost re-election.
David McKee Hall	Democratic	North Carolina 12	January 3, 1959 – January 29, 1960	Died.
Denver David Hargis	Democratic	Kansas 3	January 3, 1959 – January 3, 1961	Lost re-election.
Randall S. Harmon	Democratic	Indiana 10	January 3, 1959 – January 3, 1961	Lost re-election.
Earl Hogan	Democratic	Indiana 9	January 3, 1959 – January 3, 1961	Lost re-election.
Byron L. Johnson	Democratic	Colorado 2	January 3, 1959 – January 3, 1961	Lost re-election.
George A. Kasem	Democratic	California 25	January 3, 1959 – January 3, 1961	Lost re-election.
Robert W. Levering	Democratic	Ohio 17	January 3, 1959 – January 3, 1961	Lost re-election.
Donald McGinley	Democratic	Nebraska 4	January 3, 1959 – January 3, 1961	Lost re-election.
William H. Meyer	Democratic	Vermont at-large	January 3, 1959 – January 3, 1961	Lost re-election.
Ward Miller	Republican	Ohio 6	November 8, 1960 – January 3, 1961	Won special election. Not a candidate for full term. (Note: As there was no lame-duck session following the 1960 elections, Miller was never sworn in.)
Stanley Prokop	Democratic	Pennsylvania 10	January 3, 1959 – January 3, 1961	Lost re-election.
Edna O. Simpson	Republican	Illinois 20	January 3, 1959 – January 3, 1961	Retired.
Fred Wampler	Democratic	Indiana 6	January 3, 1959 – January 3, 1961	Lost re-election.
Leonard G. Wolf	Democratic	Iowa 2	January 3, 1959 – January 3, 1961	Lost re-election.

== 87th Congress (1961–1963) ==
Name	Party	District	Term	Notes
Peter H. Dominick	Republican	Colorado 2	January 3, 1961 – January 3, 1963	Retired to run for U.S. Senate.
Edwin Durno	Republican	Oregon 4	January 3, 1961 – January 3, 1963	Retired to run for U.S. Senate.
Peter A. Garland	Republican	Maine 1	January 3, 1961 – January 3, 1963	Lost renomination.
Walter Lewis McVey Jr.	Republican	Kansas 3	January 3, 1961 – January 3, 1963	Lost renomination.
Tom Van Horn Moorehead	Republican	Ohio 15	January 3, 1961 – January 3, 1963	Lost re-election.
Catherine Dorris Norrell	Democratic	Arkansas 6	April 19, 1961 – January 3, 1963	Won special election. District eliminated in redistricting.
M. Blaine Peterson	Democratic	Utah 1	January 3, 1961 – January 3, 1963	Lost re-election.
Louise Goff Reece	Republican	Tennessee 1	May 14, 1961 – January 3, 1963	Won special election. Not a candidate for full term.
Corinne Boyd Riley	Democratic	South Carolina 2	April 10, 1962 – January 3, 1963	Won special election. Not a candidate for full term.
William Scranton	Republican	Pennsylvania 10	January 3, 1961 – January 3, 1963	Retired to run for Governor of Pennsylvania.

== 88th Congress (1963–1965) ==
Name	Party	District	Term	Notes
Pete Abele	Republican	Ohio 10	January 3, 1963 – January 3, 1965	Lost re-election.
Irene Baker	Republican	Tennessee 2	March 10, 1964 – January 3, 1965	Won special election. Not a candidate for full term.
Everett G. Burkhalter	Democratic	California 27	January 3, 1963 – January 3, 1965	Lost re-election.
Thomas Gill	Democratic	Hawaii at-large	January 3, 1963 – January 3, 1965	Retired to run for U.S. Senate.
Patrick M. Martin	Republican	California 38	January 3, 1963 – January 3, 1965	Lost re-election.
Robert T. McLoskey	Republican	Illinois 19	January 3, 1963 – January 3, 1965	Lost re-election.
Carl West Rich	Republican	Ohio 1	January 3, 1963 – January 3, 1965	Lost re-election.
Neil Staebler	Democratic	Michigan at-large	January 3, 1963 – January 3, 1965	Retired to run for Governor of Michigan.
K. William Stinson	Republican	Washington 7	January 3, 1963 – January 3, 1965	Lost re-election.
James D. Weaver	Republican	Pennsylvania 24	January 3, 1963 – January 3, 1965	Lost re-election.

== 89th Congress (1965–1967) ==
Name	Party	District	Term	Notes
Glenn Andrews	Republican	Alabama 4	January 3, 1965 – January 3, 1967	Lost re-election.
Bert Bandstra	Democratic	Iowa 4	January 3, 1965 – January 3, 1967	Lost re-election.
Clair Armstrong Callan	Democratic	Nebraska 1	January 3, 1965 – January 3, 1967	Lost re-election.
Bo Callaway	Republican	Georgia 3	January 3, 1965 – January 3, 1967	Lost re-election.
Raymond F. Clevenger	Democratic	Michigan 11	January 3, 1965 – January 3, 1967	Lost re-election.
Nathaniel N. Craley Jr.	Democratic	Pennsylvania 19	January 3, 1965 – January 3, 1967	Lost re-election.
Kenneth W. Dyal	Democratic	California 33	January 3, 1965 – January 3, 1967	Lost re-election.
Charles R. Farnsley	Democratic	Kentucky 3	January 3, 1965 – January 3, 1967	Retired.
Billie S. Farnum	Democratic	Michigan 19	January 3, 1965 – January 3, 1967	Lost re-election.
John J. Gilligan	Democratic	Ohio 1	January 3, 1965 – January 3, 1967	Lost re-election.
Stanley L. Greigg	Democratic	Iowa 6	January 3, 1965 – January 3, 1967	Lost re-election.
George W. Grider	Democratic	Tennessee 9	January 3, 1965 – January 3, 1967	Lost re-election.
John R. Hansen	Democratic	Iowa 7	January 3, 1965 – January 3, 1967	Lost re-election.
J. Oliva Huot	Democratic	New Hampshire 1	January 3, 1965 – January 3, 1967	Lost re-election.
Jed Johnson Jr.	Democratic	Oklahoma 6	January 3, 1965 – January 3, 1967	Lost re-election.
Paul J. Krebs	Democratic	New Jersey 12	January 3, 1965 – January 3, 1967	Retired.
Rodney M. Love	Democratic	Ohio 3	January 3, 1965 – January 3, 1967	Lost re-election.
James MacKay	Democratic	Georgia 4	January 3, 1965 – January 3, 1967	Lost re-election.
John C. Mackie	Democratic	Michigan 7	January 3, 1965 – January 3, 1967	Lost re-election.
James D. Martin	Republican	Alabama 7	January 3, 1965 – January 3, 1967	Retired to run for Governor of Alabama.
Thomas C. McGrath Jr.	Democratic	New Jersey 2	January 3, 1965 – January 3, 1967	Lost re-election.
Roy H. McVicker	Democratic	Colorado 2	January 3, 1965 – January 3, 1967	Lost re-election.
John Abner Race	Democratic	Wisconsin 6	January 3, 1965 – January 3, 1967	Lost re-election.
Rolland W. Redlin	Democratic	North Dakota 2	January 3, 1965 – January 3, 1967	Lost re-election.
Gale Schisler	Democratic	Illinois 19	January 3, 1965 – January 3, 1967	Lost re-election.
John R. Schmidhauser	Democratic	Iowa 1	January 3, 1965 – January 3, 1967	Lost re-election.
Lynn E. Stalbaum	Democratic	Wisconsin 1	January 3, 1965 – January 3, 1967	Lost re-election.
Robert E. Sweeney	Democratic	Ohio at-large	January 3, 1965 – January 3, 1967	Retired to run for Attorney General of Ohio.
Lera Millard Thomas	Democratic	Texas 8	March 26, 1966 – January 3, 1967	Won special election. Not a candidate for full term.
Paul H. Todd Jr.	Democratic	Michigan 3	January 3, 1965 – January 3, 1967	Lost re-election.
Weston E. Vivian	Democratic	Michigan 2	January 3, 1965 – January 3, 1967	Lost re-election.
Prentiss Walker	Republican	Mississippi 4	January 3, 1965 – January 3, 1967	Retired to run for U.S. Senate.

== 90th Congress (1967–1969) ==
Name	Party	District	Term	Notes
Jim Gardner	Republican	North Carolina 4	January 3, 1967 – January 3, 1969	Retired to run for Governor of North Carolina.
James Vernon Smith	Republican	Oklahoma 6	January 3, 1967 – January 3, 1969	Lost re-election.

== 91st Congress (1969–1971) ==
Name	Party	District	Term	Notes
J. Glenn Beall Jr.	Republican	Maryland 6	January 3, 1969 – January 3, 1971	Retired to run for U.S. Senate.
Allard K. Lowenstein	Democratic	New York 5	January 3, 1969 – January 3, 1971	Lost re-election.
Martin B. McKneally	Republican	New York 27	January 3, 1969 – January 3, 1971	Lost re-election.
Lowell Weicker	Republican	Connecticut 4	January 3, 1969 – January 3, 1971	Retired to run for U.S. Senate.
John S. Wold	Republican	Wyoming at-large	January 3, 1969 – January 3, 1971	Retired to run for U.S. Senate.

== 92nd Congress (1971–1973) ==
Name	Party	District	Term	Notes
James Abourezk	Democratic	South Dakota 2	January 3, 1971 – January 3, 1973	Retired to run for U.S. Senate.
Elizabeth B. Andrews	Democratic	Alabama 3	April 4, 1972 – January 3, 1973	Won special election. Not a candidate for full term.
Nick Begich Sr.	Democratic	Alaska at-large	January 3, 1971 – October 16, 1972	Disappeared. (Note: Begich and House Majority Leader Hale Boggs along with two others disappeared on October 16, 1972, while flying from Anchorage to Juneau. Begich was re-elected in absentia, but was declared dead on December 29, 1972. His body was never found.)
Cliffard D. Carlson	Republican	Illinois 15	April 4, 1972 – January 3, 1973	Won special election. Not a candidate for full term.
William Sheldrick Conover	Republican	Pennsylvania 27	April 25, 1972 – January 3, 1973	Won special election. Lost nomination for full term.
William P. Curlin Jr.	Democratic	Kentucky 6	December 3, 1971 – January 3, 1973	Won special election. Retired.
Louise Day Hicks	Democratic	Massachusetts 9	January 3, 1971 – January 3, 1973	Lost re-election.
Arthur A. Link	Democratic	North Dakota 2	January 3, 1971 – January 3, 1973	District eliminated in redistricting.
Mike McKevitt	Republican	Colorado 1	January 3, 1971 – January 3, 1973	Lost re-election.
John H. Terry	Republican	New York 34	January 3, 1971 – January 3, 1973	Retired.

== 93rd Congress (1973–1975) ==
Name	Party	District	Term	Notes
Paul W. Cronin	Republican	Massachusetts 5	January 3, 1973 – January 3, 1975	Lost re-election.
Harold Vernon Froehlich	Republican	Wisconsin 8	January 3, 1973 – January 3, 1975	Lost re-election.
Bill Gunter	Democratic	Florida 5	January 3, 1973 – January 3, 1975	Retired to run for U.S. Senate.
Robert P. Hanrahan	Republican	Illinois 3	January 3, 1973 – January 3, 1975	Lost re-election.
Robert J. Huber	Republican	Michigan 18	January 3, 1973 – January 3, 1975	Lost re-election.
William H. Hudnut III	Republican	Indiana 11	January 3, 1973 – January 3, 1975	Lost re-election.
Joseph J. Maraziti	Republican	New Jersey 13	January 3, 1973 – January 3, 1975	Lost re-election.
Clem McSpadden	Democratic	Oklahoma 2	January 3, 1973 – January 3, 1975	Retired to run for Governor of Oklahoma.
Angelo D. Roncallo	Republican	New York 3	January 3, 1973 – January 3, 1975	Lost re-election.
David Towell	Republican	Nevada at-large	January 3, 1973 – January 3, 1975	Lost re-election.
Edward Lunn Young	Republican	South Carolina 6	January 3, 1973 – January 3, 1975	Lost re-election.
Samuel H. Young	Republican	Illinois 10	January 3, 1973 – January 3, 1975	Lost re-election.

== 94th Congress (1975–1977) ==
Name	Party	District	Term	Notes
Tim Lee Hall	Democratic	Illinois 15	January 3, 1975 – January 3, 1977	Lost re-election.
Philip H. Hayes	Democratic	Indiana 8	January 3, 1975 – January 3, 1977	Retired to run for U.S. Senate.
Allan Turner Howe	Democratic	Utah 2	January 3, 1975 – January 3, 1977	Lost re-election.

== 95th Congress (1977–1979) ==
Name	Party	District	Term	Notes
Joseph S. Ammerman	Democratic	Pennsylvania 23	January 3, 1977 – January 3, 1979	Lost re-election.
Bruce F. Caputo	Republican	New York 23	January 3, 1977 – January 3, 1979	Retired to run for Lieutenant Governor of New York.
David L. Cornwell	Democratic	Indiana 8	January 3, 1977 – January 3, 1979	Lost re-election.
John E. Cunningham	Republican	Washington 7	May 17, 1977 – January 3, 1979	Won special election. Lost election to full term.
Robert Gammage	Democratic	Texas 22	January 3, 1977 – January 3, 1979	Lost re-election.
Joseph A. LeFante	Democratic	New Jersey 14	January 3, 1977 – December 14, 1978	Resigned.
Newton Steers	Republican	Maryland 8	January 3, 1977 – January 3, 1979	Lost re-election.
Richard Alvin Tonry	Democratic	Louisiana 1	January 3, 1977 – May 4, 1977	Resigned to trigger special election. Defeated in special election.
Jim Guy Tucker	Democratic	Arkansas 2	January 3, 1977 – January 3, 1979	Retired to run for U.S. Senate.

== 96th Congress (1979–1981) ==
Name	Party	District	Term	Notes
William Royer	Republican	California 11	April 3, 1979 – January 3, 1981	Won special election. Lost election to full term.
John G. Hutchinson	Democratic	West Virginia 3	June 30, 1980 – January 3, 1981	Won special election. Lost election to full term.
Buddy Leach	Democratic	Louisiana 4	January 3, 1979 – January 3, 1981	Lost re-election in jungle primary.
Ray Musto	Democratic	Pennsylvania 11	April 9, 1980 – January 3, 1981	Won special election. Lost election to full term.
Edward J. Stack	Democratic	Florida 12	January 3, 1979 – January 3, 1981	Lost renomination.
Bennett Stewart	Democratic	Illinois 1	January 3, 1979 – January 3, 1981	Lost renomination.
Joseph P. Wyatt Jr.	Democratic	Texas 14	January 3, 1979 – January 3, 1981	Retired.

== 97th Congress (1981–1983) ==
Name	Party	District	Term	Notes
Jean Spencer Ashbrook	Republican	Ohio 17	June 29, 1982 – January 3, 1983	Won special election. Not a candidate for full term.
Wendell Bailey	Republican	Missouri 8	January 3, 1981 – January 3, 1983	Retired.
Cleve Benedict	Republican	West Virginia 2	January 3, 1981 – January 3, 1983	Retired to run for U.S. Senate.
Gregory W. Carman	Republican	New York 3	January 3, 1981 – January 3, 1983	Retired.
James K. Coyne III	Republican	Pennsylvania 8	January 3, 1981 – January 3, 1983	Lost re-election.
Lawrence J. DeNardis	Republican	Connecticut 3	January 3, 1981 – January 3, 1983	Lost re-election.
James Whitney Dunn	Republican	Michigan 6	January 3, 1981 – January 3, 1983	Lost re-election.
Walter E. Johnston III	Republican	North Carolina 6	January 3, 1981 – January 3, 1983	Lost re-election.
John LeBoutillier	Republican	New York 6	January 3, 1981 – January 3, 1983	Lost re-election.
John Light Napier	Republican	South Carolina 6	January 3, 1981 – January 3, 1983	Lost re-election.
James Nelligan	Republican	Pennsylvania 11	January 3, 1981 – January 3, 1983	Lost re-election.
Clint Roberts	Republican	South Dakota 2	January 3, 1981 – January 3, 1983	District eliminated. Lost re-election in race for at-large seat to fellow incumbent.
Bob Shamansky	Democratic	Ohio 12	January 3, 1981 – January 3, 1983	Lost re-election.
Albert L. Smith Jr.	Republican	Alabama 6	January 3, 1981 – January 3, 1983	Lost re-election.
Joseph F. Smith	Republican	Pennsylvania 3	July 21, 1981 – January 3, 1983	Won special election. Redistricted to the 1st district Lost nomination for full term to fellow incumbent.
Joseph F. Smith	Democratic (Note: After losing the Democratic primary for the special election, Smith was offered the Republican line on the ballot, and accepted. He caucused with the Democrats for his entire congressional career, and never unregistered from the party.)	Pennsylvania 3	July 21, 1981 – January 3, 1983	Won special election. Redistricted to the 1st district Lost nomination for full term to fellow incumbent.
Mick Staton	Republican	West Virginia 3	January 3, 1981 – January 3, 1983	Lost re-election.
Ed Weber	Republican	Ohio 9	January 3, 1981 – January 3, 1983	Lost re-election.

== 98th Congress (1983–1985) ==
Name	Party	District	Term	Notes
Charles Robin Britt	Democratic	North Carolina 6	January 3, 1983 – January 3, 1985	Lost re-election.
Frank Harrison	Democratic	Pennsylvania 11	January 3, 1983 – January 3, 1985	Lost renomination.
James F. McNulty Jr.	Democratic	Arizona 5	January 3, 1983 – January 3, 1985	Lost re-election.
Tom Vandergriff	Democratic	Texas 26	January 3, 1983 – January 3, 1985	Lost re-election.

== 99th Congress (1985–1987) ==
Name	Party	District	Term	Notes
Bill Cobey	Republican	North Carolina 4	January 3, 1985 – January 3, 1987	Lost re-election.
Fred J. Eckert	Republican	New York 30	January 3, 1985 – January 3, 1987	Lost re-election.
John E. Grotberg	Republican	Illinois 14	January 3, 1985 – November 15, 1986	Retired. Died before term expired.
Catherine Small Long	Democratic	Louisiana 8	March 30, 1985 – January 3, 1987	Won special election. Not a candidate for full term.
David Smith Monson	Republican	Utah 2	January 3, 1985 – January 3, 1987	Retired.
Michael L. Strang	Republican	Colorado 3	January 3, 1985 – January 3, 1987	Lost re-election.
Alton Waldon	Democratic	New York 6	June 10, 1986 – January 3, 1987	Won special election. Lost nomination for full term.

== 100th Congress (1987–1989) ==
Name	Party	District	Term	Notes
Jack Davis	Republican	Illinois 4	January 3, 1987 – January 3, 1989	Lost re-election.
Ernie Konnyu	Republican	California 12	January 3, 1987 – January 3, 1989	Lost renomination.

== 101st Congress (1989–1991) ==
Name	Party	District	Term	Notes
Charles Douglas III	Republican	New Hampshire 2	January 3, 1989 – January 3, 1991	Lost re-election.
Larkin I. Smith	Republican	Mississippi 5	January 3, 1989 – August 13, 1989	Died.
Peter Plympton Smith	Republican	Vermont at-large	January 3, 1989 – January 3, 1991	Lost re-election.

== 102nd Congress (1991–1993) ==
Name	Party	District	Term	Notes
George Allen	Republican	Virginia 7	November 5, 1991 – January 3, 1993	Won special election. Not a candidate for full term.
John W. Cox Jr.	Democratic	Illinois 16	January 3, 1991 – January 3, 1993	Lost re-election.
Joan Kelly Horn	Democratic	Missouri 2	January 3, 1991 – January 3, 1993	Lost re-election.
Charlie Luken	Democratic	Ohio 1	January 3, 1991 – January 3, 1993	Retired.
Dick Nichols	Republican	Kansas 5	January 3, 1991 – January 3, 1993	District eliminated in redistricting. Ran in 4th district. Lost renomination to fellow incumbent.

== 103rd Congress (1993–1995) ==
Name	Party	District	Term	Notes
Peter W. Barca	Democratic	Wisconsin 1	May 4, 1993 – January 3, 1995	Won special election. Lost election to full term.
Thomas Barlow	Democratic	Kentucky 1	January 3, 1993 – January 3, 1995	Lost re-election.
Leslie Byrne	Democratic	Virginia 11	January 3, 1993 – January 3, 1995	Lost re-election.
Maria Cantwell	Democratic	Washington 1	January 3, 1993 – January 3, 1995	Lost re-election.
Sam Coppersmith	Democratic	Arizona 1	January 3, 1993 – January 3, 1995	Retired to run for U.S. Senate.
Karan English	Democratic	Arizona 6	January 3, 1993 – January 3, 1995	Lost re-election.
Eric Fingerhut	Democratic	Ohio 19	January 3, 1993 – January 3, 1995	Lost re-election.
Rod Grams	Republican	Minnesota 6	January 3, 1993 – January 3, 1995	Retired to run for U.S. Senate.
Daniel Hamburg	Democratic	California 1	January 3, 1993 – January 3, 1995	Lost re-election.
Michael Huffington	Republican	California 22	January 3, 1993 – January 3, 1995	Retired to run for U.S. Senate.
Don Johnson Jr.	Democratic	Georgia 10	January 3, 1993 – January 3, 1995	Lost re-election.
Herb Klein	Democratic	New Jersey 8	January 3, 1993 – January 3, 1995	Lost re-election.
Mike Kreidler	Democratic	Washington 9	January 3, 1993 – January 3, 1995	Lost re-election.
David A. Levy	Republican	New York 4	January 3, 1993 – January 3, 1995	Lost renomination.
David S. Mann	Democratic	Ohio 1	January 3, 1993 – January 3, 1995	Lost re-election.
Marjorie Margolies	Democratic	Pennsylvania 13	January 3, 1993 – January 3, 1995	Lost re-election.
Lynn Schenk	Democratic	California 49	January 3, 1993 – January 3, 1995	Lost re-election.
Karen Shepherd	Democratic	Utah 2	January 3, 1993 – January 3, 1995	Lost re-election.

== 104th Congress (1995–1997) ==
Name	Party	District	Term	Notes
Sam Brownback	Republican	Kansas 2	January 3, 1995 – November 7, 1996	Retired to run for U.S. Senate. Resigned early to take seat in Senate.
Jim Bunn	Republican	Oregon 5	January 3, 1995 – January 3, 1997	Lost re-election.
Dick Chrysler	Republican	Michigan 8	January 3, 1995 – January 3, 1997	Lost re-election.
Wes Cooley	Republican	Oregon 2	January 3, 1995 – January 3, 1997	Withdrew from re-election campaign.
Frank Cremeans	Republican	Ohio 6	January 3, 1995 – January 3, 1997	Lost re-election.
Michael Patrick Flanagan	Republican	Illinois 5	January 3, 1995 – January 3, 1997	Lost re-election.
Dan Frisa	Republican	New York 4	January 3, 1995 – January 3, 1997	Lost re-election.
David Funderburk	Republican	North Carolina 2	January 3, 1995 – January 3, 1997	Lost re-election.
Fred Heineman	Republican	North Carolina 4	January 3, 1995 – January 3, 1997	Lost re-election.
Enid Greene (Note: Enid Greene was known for the majority of her term by her married name, Enid Greene Waldholtz. She divorced her husband prior to the conclusion of her term, and went back to Enid Greene. She has since remarried, and is now known as Enid Greene Mickelsen.)	Republican	Utah 2	January 3, 1995 – January 3, 1997	Retired.
James B. Longley Jr.	Republican	Maine 1	January 3, 1995 – January 3, 1997	Lost re-election.
William J. Martini	Republican	New Jersey 8	January 3, 1995 – January 3, 1997	Lost re-election.
Andrea Seastrand	Republican	California 22	January 3, 1995 – January 3, 1997	Lost re-election.
Randy Tate	Republican	Washington 9	January 3, 1995 – January 3, 1997	Lost re-election.
Mike Ward	Democratic	Kentucky 3	January 3, 1995 – January 3, 1997	Lost re-election.

== 105th Congress (1997–1999) ==
Name	Party	District	Term	Notes
Walter Capps	Democratic	California 22	January 3, 1997 – October 28, 1997	Died.
Jay Johnson	Democratic	Wisconsin 8	January 3, 1997 – January 3, 1999	Lost re-election.
Mike Pappas	Republican	New Jersey 12	January 3, 1997 – January 3, 1999	Lost re-election.
Bill Redmond	Republican	New Mexico 3	May 13, 1997 – January 3, 1999	Won special election. Lost election to full term.
Vince Snowbarger	Republican	Kansas 3	January 3, 1997 – January 3, 1999	Lost re-election.

== 106th Congress (1999–2001) ==
Name	Party	District	Term	Notes
Steven T. Kuykendall	Republican	California 36	January 3, 1999 – January 3, 2001	Lost re-election.

== 107th Congress (2001–2003) ==
Name	Party	District	Term	Notes
Felix Grucci	Republican	New York 1	January 3, 2001 – January 3, 2003	Lost re-election.
Brian D. Kerns	Republican	Indiana 7	January 3, 2001 – January 3, 2003	Redistricted to the 4th district. Lost renomination in new district to fellow incumbent.

== 108th Congress (2003–2005) ==
Name	Party	District	Term	Notes
Frank Ballance	Democratic	North Carolina 1	January 3, 2003 – June 8, 2004	Resigned.
Chris Bell	Democratic	Texas 25	January 3, 2003 – January 3, 2005	Redistricted to the 9th district. Lost renomination in new district.
Max Burns	Republican	Georgia 12	January 3, 2003 – January 3, 2005	Lost re-election.
Bill Janklow	Republican	South Dakota at-large	January 3, 2003 – January 20, 2004	Resigned
Denise Majette	Democratic	Georgia 4	January 3, 2003 – January 3, 2005	Retired to run for U.S. Senate.

== 109th Congress (2005–2007) ==
Name	Party	District	Term	Notes
Joe Schwarz	Republican	Michigan 7	January 3, 2005 – January 3, 2007	Lost renomination.
Shelley Sekula-Gibbs	Republican	Texas 22	November 13, 2006 – January 3, 2007	Won special election. Lost election to full term.
Mike Sodrel	Republican	Indiana 9	January 3, 2005 – January 3, 2007	Lost re-election.

== 110th Congress (2007–2009) ==
Name	Party	District	Term	Notes
Nancy Boyda	Democratic	Kansas 2	January 3, 2007 – January 3, 2009	Lost re-election.
Don Cazayoux	Democratic	Louisiana 6	May 3, 2008 – January 3, 2009	Won special election. Lost election to full term.
David Davis	Republican	Tennessee 1	January 3, 2007 – January 3, 2009	Lost renomination.
Tim Mahoney	Democratic	Florida 16	January 3, 2007 – January 3, 2009	Lost re-election.
Bill Sali	Republican	Idaho 1	January 3, 2007 – January 3, 2009	Lost re-election.

== 111th Congress (2009–2011) ==
Name	Party	District	Term	Notes
John Adler	Democratic	New Jersey 3	January 3, 2009 – January 3, 2011	Lost re-election.
John Boccieri	Democratic	Ohio 16	January 3, 2009 – January 3, 2011	Lost re-election.
Bobby Bright	Democratic	Alabama 2	January 3, 2009 – January 3, 2011	Lost re-election.
Joseph Cao	Republican	Louisiana 2	January 3, 2009 – January 3, 2011	Lost re-election.
Kathy Dahlkemper	Democratic	Pennsylvania 3	January 3, 2009 – January 3, 2011	Lost re-election.
Charles Djou	Republican	Hawaii 1	May 22, 2010 – January 3, 2011	Won special election. Lost election to full term.
Steve Driehaus	Democratic	Ohio 1	January 3, 2009 – January 3, 2011	Lost re-election.
Parker Griffith	Democratic	Alabama 5	January 3, 2009 – January 3, 2011	Lost renomination as a Republican.
Parker Griffith	Republican (Note: Griffith left the Democratic Party on December 22, 2009 and became a Republican.)	Alabama 5	January 3, 2009 – January 3, 2011	Lost renomination as a Republican.
Debbie Halvorson	Democratic	Illinois 11	January 3, 2009 – January 3, 2011	Lost re-election.
Mary Jo Kilroy	Democratic	Ohio 15	January 3, 2009 – January 3, 2011	Lost re-election.
Suzanne Kosmas	Democratic	Florida 24	January 3, 2009 – January 3, 2011	Lost re-election.
Frank Kratovil	Democratic	Maryland 1	January 3, 2009 – January 3, 2011	Lost re-election.
Betsy Markey	Democratic	Colorado 4	January 3, 2009 – January 3, 2011	Lost re-election.
Eric Massa	Democratic	New York 29	January 3, 2009 – March 8, 2010	Resigned.
Michael McMahon	Democratic	New York 13	January 3, 2009 – January 3, 2011	Lost re-election.
Walt Minnick	Democratic	Idaho 1	January 3, 2009 – January 3, 2011	Lost re-election.
Scott Murphy	Democratic	New York 20	April 29, 2009 – January 3, 2011	Won special election. Lost election to full term.
Glenn Nye	Democratic	Virginia 2	January 3, 2009 – January 3, 2011	Lost re-election.
Tom Perriello	Democratic	Virginia 5	January 3, 2009 – January 3, 2011	Lost re-election.
Mark Schauer	Democratic	Michigan 7	January 3, 2009 – January 3, 2011	Lost re-election.
Harry Teague	Democratic	New Mexico 2	January 3, 2009 – January 3, 2011	Lost re-election.

== 112th Congress (2011–2013) ==
Name	Party	District	Term	Notes
Sandy Adams	Republican	Florida 24	January 3, 2011 – January 3, 2013	Redistricted to the 7th district. Lost renomination in new district to fellow incumbent.
Rick Berg	Republican	North Dakota at-large	January 3, 2011 – January 3, 2013	Retired to run for U.S. Senate.
Ann Marie Buerkle	Republican	New York 25	January 3, 2011 – January 3, 2013	Redistricted to the 24th district. Lost re-election in new district.
Quico Canseco	Republican	Texas 23	January 3, 2011 – January 3, 2013	Lost re-election.
Hansen Clarke	Democratic	Michigan 13	January 3, 2011 – January 3, 2013	Redistricted to the 14th district. Lost renomination in new district to fellow incumbent.
Chip Cravaack	Republican	Minnesota 8	January 3, 2011 – January 3, 2013	Lost re-election.
David Curson	Democratic	Michigan 11	November 13, 2012 – January 3, 2013	Won special election. Not a candidate for full term.
Nan Hayworth	Republican	New York 19	January 3, 2011 – January 3, 2013	Lost re-election.
Kathy Hochul	Democratic	New York 26	June 1, 2011 – January 3, 2013	Won special election. Redistricted to the 27th district. Lost election to full term in new district.
Jeff Landry	Republican	Louisiana 3	January 3, 2011 – January 3, 2013	Lost re-election in new district to fellow incumbent.
Ben Quayle	Republican	Arizona 3	January 3, 2011 – January 3, 2013	Redistricted to the 6th district. Lost renomination in new district to fellow incumbent.
David Rivera	Republican	Florida 25	January 3, 2011 – January 3, 2013	Redistricted to the 26th district. Lost re-election in new district.
Bobby Schilling	Republican	Illinois 17	January 3, 2011 – January 3, 2013	Lost re-election.
Tim Scott	Republican	South Carolina 1	January 3, 2011 – January 2, 2013	Re-elected, but resigned before start of second term upon appointment to U.S. Senate.
Bob Turner	Republican	New York 9	September 13, 2011 – January 3, 2013	Won special election. Retired to run for U.S. Senate.
Joe Walsh	Republican	Illinois 8	January 3, 2011 – January 3, 2013	Lost re-election.
Allen West	Republican	Florida 22	January 3, 2011 – January 3, 2013	Redistricted to the 18th district. Lost re-election in new district.

== 113th Congress (2013–2015) ==
Name	Party	District	Term	Notes
Kerry Bentivolio	Republican	Michigan 11	January 3, 2013 – January 3, 2015	Lost renomination.
Tom Cotton	Republican	Arkansas 4	January 3, 2013 – January 3, 2015	Retired to run for U.S. Senate.
Steve Daines	Republican	Montana at-large	January 3, 2013 – January 3, 2015	Retired to run for U.S. Senate.
William Enyart	Democratic	Illinois 12	January 3, 2013 – January 3, 2015	Lost re-election.
Pete Gallego	Democratic	Texas 23	January 3, 2013 – January 3, 2015	Lost re-election.
Joe Garcia	Democratic	Florida 26	January 3, 2013 – January 3, 2015	Lost re-election.
Vance McAllister	Republican	Louisiana 5	November 16, 2013 – January 3, 2015	Won special election. Defeated in jungle primary for full term.
Gloria Negrete McLeod	Democratic	California 35	January 3, 2013 – January 3, 2015	Retired to run for San Bernardino County Board of Supervisors.
Trey Radel	Republican	Florida 19	January 3, 2013 – January 27, 2014	Resigned.

== 114th Congress (2015–2017) ==
Name	Party	District	Term	Notes
Brad Ashford	Democratic	Nebraska 2	January 3, 2015 – January 3, 2017	Lost re-election.
Gwen Graham	Democratic	Florida 2	January 3, 2015 – January 3, 2017	Retired.
Cresent Hardy	Republican	Nevada 4	January 3, 2015 – January 3, 2017	Lost re-election.
Mark Takai	Democratic	Hawaii 1	January 3, 2015 – July 20, 2016	Died.

== 115th Congress (2017–2019) ==
Name	Party	District	Term	Notes
John Faso	Republican	New York 19	January 3, 2017 – January 3, 2019	Lost re-election.
Tom Garrett	Republican	Virginia 5	January 3, 2017 – January 3, 2019	Retired.
Karen Handel	Republican	Georgia 6	June 26, 2017 – January 3, 2019	Won special election. Lost election to full term.
Brenda Jones	Democratic	Michigan 13	November 29, 2018 – January 3, 2019	Won special election. Lost nomination for full term.
Ruben Kihuen	Democratic	Nevada 4	January 3, 2017 – January 3, 2019	Retired.
Jason Lewis	Republican	Minnesota 2	January 3, 2017 – January 3, 2019	Lost re-election.
Jacky Rosen	Democratic	Nevada 3	January 3, 2017 – January 3, 2019	Retired to run for U.S. Senate.
Scott Taylor	Republican	Virginia 2	January 3, 2017 – January 3, 2019	Lost re-election.

== 116th Congress (2019–2021) ==
Name	Party	District	Term	Notes
Anthony Brindisi	Democratic	New York 22	January 3, 2019 – January 3, 2021	Lost re-election.
TJ Cox	Democratic	California 21	January 3, 2019 – January 3, 2021	Lost re-election.
Joe Cunningham	Democratic	South Carolina 1	January 3, 2019 – January 3, 2021	Lost re-election.
Abby Finkenauer	Democratic	Iowa 1	January 3, 2019 – January 3, 2021	Lost re-election.
Kwanza Hall	Democratic	Georgia 5	December 3, 2020 – January 3, 2021	Won special election. Not a candidate for full term.
Katie Hill	Democratic	California 25	January 3, 2019 – November 3, 2019	Resigned.
Kendra Horn	Democratic	Oklahoma 5	January 3, 2019 – January 3, 2021	Lost re-election.
Debbie Mucarsel-Powell	Democratic	Florida 26	January 3, 2019 – January 3, 2021	Lost re-election.
Denver Riggleman	Republican	Virginia 5	January 3, 2019 – January 3, 2021	Lost renomination.
Max Rose	Democratic	New York 11	January 3, 2019 – January 3, 2021	Lost re-election.
Harley Rouda	Democratic	California 48	January 3, 2019 – January 3, 2021	Lost re-election.
Donna Shalala	Democratic	Florida 27	January 3, 2019 – January 3, 2021	Lost re-election.
Ross Spano	Republican	Florida 15	January 3, 2019 – January 3, 2021	Lost renomination.
Xochitl Torres Small	Democratic	New Mexico 2	January 3, 2019 – January 3, 2021	Lost re-election.
Steve Watkins	Republican	Kansas 2	January 3, 2019 – January 3, 2021	Lost renomination.

== 117th Congress (2021–2023) ==
Name	Party	District	Term	Notes
Carolyn Bourdeaux	Democratic	Georgia 7	January 3, 2021 – January 3, 2023	Lost renomination to fellow incumbent.
Connie Conway	Republican	California 22	June 14, 2022 – January 3, 2023	Won special election. Not a candidate for full term.
Madison Cawthorn	Republican	North Carolina 11	January 3, 2021 – January 3, 2023	Lost renomination.
Mayra Flores	Republican	Texas 34	June 21, 2022 – January 3, 2023	Won special election. Lost election to full term to fellow incumbent.
Yvette Herrell	Republican	New Mexico 2	January 3, 2021 – January 3, 2023	Lost re-election.
Mondaire Jones	Democratic	New York 17	January 3, 2021 – January 3, 2023	Redistricted to the 10th district. Lost renomination in new district.
Kai Kahele	Democratic	Hawaii 2	January 3, 2021 – January 3, 2023	Retired to run for Governor of Hawaii.
Peter Meijer	Republican	Michigan 3	January 3, 2021 – January 3, 2023	Lost renomination.
Marie Newman	Democratic	Illinois 3	January 3, 2021 – January 3, 2023	Redistricted to the 6th district. Lost renomination in new district to fellow incumbent.
Joe Sempolinski	Republican	New York 23	September 13, 2022 – January 3, 2023	Won special election. Not a candidate for full term.

== 118th Congress (2023–2025) ==
Name	Party	District	Term	Notes
Yadira Caraveo	Democratic	Colorado 8	January 3, 2023 – January 3, 2025	Lost re-election.
Erica Lee Carter	Democratic	Texas 18	November 12, 2024 – January 3, 2025	Won special election. Not a candidate for full term.
Lori Chavez-DeRemer	Republican	Oregon 5	January 3, 2023 – January 3, 2025	Lost re-election.
Anthony D'Esposito	Republican	New York 4	January 3, 2023 – January 3, 2025	Lost re-election.
John Duarte	Republican	California 13	January 3, 2023 – January 3, 2025	Lost re-election.
Jeff Jackson	Democratic	North Carolina 14	January 3, 2023 – December 31, 2024	Retired to run for attorney general of North Carolina. Resigned early to assume that role.
Greg Lopez	Republican	Colorado 4	July 8, 2024 – January 3, 2025	Won special election. Not a candidate for full term.
Marc Molinaro	Republican	New York 19	January 3, 2023 – January 3, 2025	Lost re-election.
Wiley Nickel	Democratic	North Carolina 13	January 3, 2023 – January 3, 2025	Retired.
George Santos	Republican	New York 3	January 3, 2023 – December 1, 2023	Expelled.
Brandon Williams	Republican	New York 22	January 3, 2023 – January 3, 2025	Lost re-election.

== 119th Congress (2025–2027) ==
Name	Party	District	Term	Notes
Tom Barrett	Republican	Michigan 7	January 3, 2025 – January 3, 2027	Lost re-election.
Everton Blair	Democratic	Georgia 13	August 25, 2026 – January 3, 2027	Elected in a special election. Lost nomination to full term.
Rob Bresnahan	Republican	Pennsylvania 8	January 3, 2025 – January 3, 2027	Lost re-election.
Jeff Crank	Republican	Colorado 5	January 3, 2025 – January 3, 2027	Lost re-election.
Gabe Evans	Republican	Colorado 8	January 3, 2025 – January 3, 2027	Lost re-election.
James Gallagher	Republican	California 1	June 10, 2026 – January 3, 2027	Elected in a special election. Lost election to full term.
Julie Johnson	Democratic	Texas 32	January 3, 2025 – January 3, 2027	Redistricted to the 33rd district. Lost renomination in new district.
Brad Knott	Republican	North Carolina 13	January 3, 2025 – January 3, 2027	Lost re-election.
Ryan Mackenzie	Republican	Pennsylvania 7	January 3, 2025 – January 3, 2027	Lost re-election.
Addison McDowell	Republican	North Carolina 6	January 3, 2025 – January 3, 2027	Lost re-election.
Tim Moore	Republican	North Carolina 14	January 3, 2025 – January 3, 2027	Lost re-election.
Sylvester Turner	Democratic	Texas 18	January 3, 2025 – March 5, 2025	Died.
