= William Kenyon House =

Historic house in New York, United States

- U.S. National Register of Historic Places
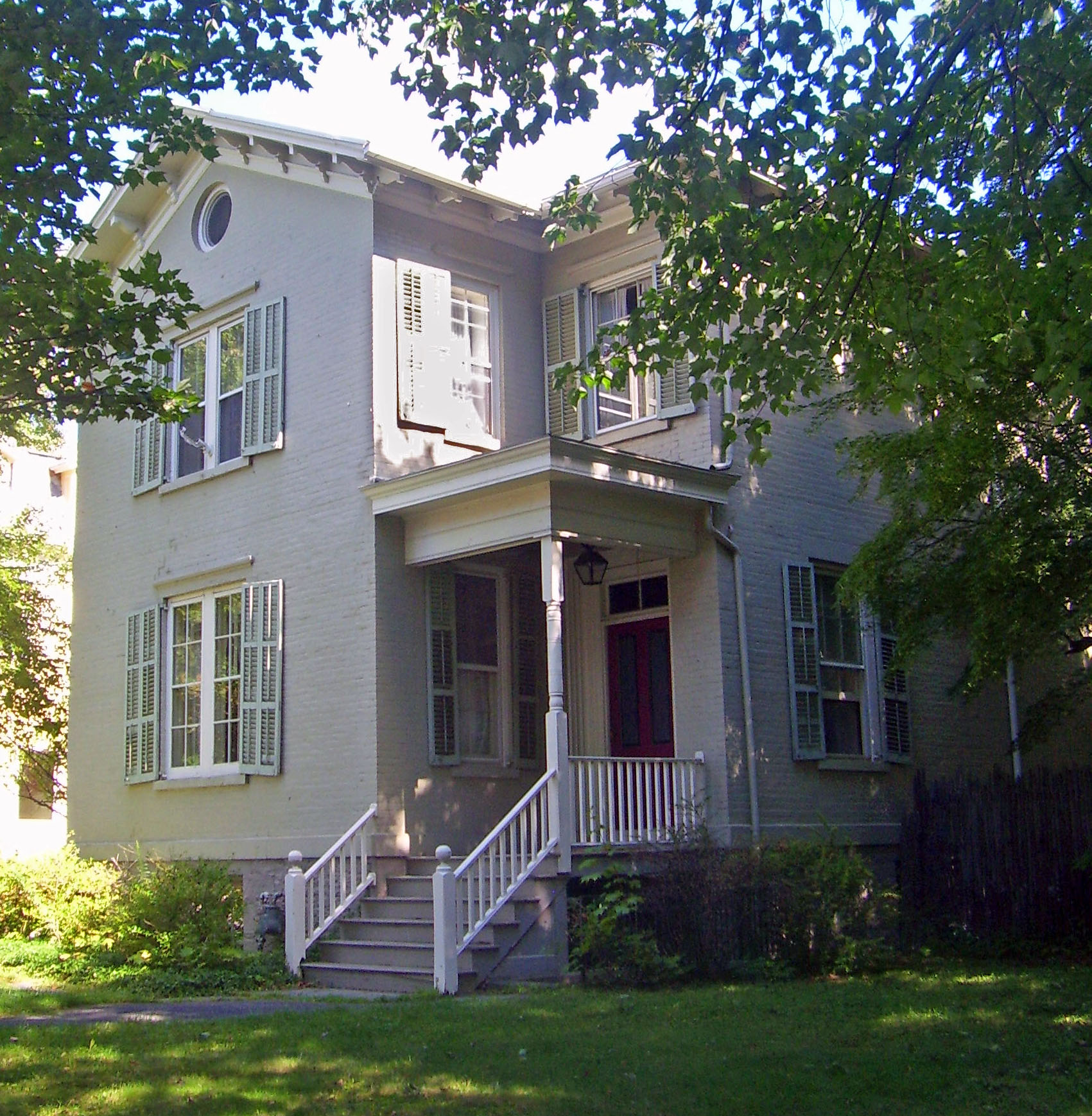
- West elevation and south profile, 2008

- Location within New York Location within the United States
- Interactive map showing the location of Kenyon House
- Location: Kingston, NY
- Coordinates: 41°55′41″N 74°0′52″W
- Built: ca. 1850
- Architectural style: Italian villa
- NRHP reference No.: 01001387
- Added to NRHP: 2001

The William Kenyon House is located on Fair Street in Kingston, New York, United States. It was built by William Kenyon, a member of Congress from the area, in the mid-19th century.

It is an intact example of the center-gable Italian villa-style house popular at the time. In 2001 it was listed on the National Register of Historic Places.

== Property ==
The house is located on the east side of Fair Street two lots north of its junction with Franklin Street. The neighborhood is residential, dominated by similar 19th-century houses. Two others just up the street, the Boice and Chichester houses, are also listed on the National Register.

Standing two and a half stories on a stone and brick foundation, the house is sided in tan-painted brick. It is topped with a low asphalt-shinged hipped roof with modillion-supported overhanging eaves at the roofline. There is one brick outbuilding in the rear, which seems to have served as a summer kitchen. It is a contributing resource to the property's historic character.

The west (front) facade is three bays wide. The northern two bays project. On both stories it has a centrally located double window with molded stone cornice and sill and original wooden louvered shutters. In the center of the gable apex is an oculus.

Two windows, also with their original shutters, are located symmetrically on the north and south profiles of the house. A modern two-story wing projects from the east elevation.

Wooden steps lead up to the main entrance in the southern bay. It is sheltered by a flat-roofed porch with plain wide frieze and cornice supported by a single turned pillar rising from a wooden railing. A double door with transom opens into a side hall with a detailed wooden stair. Pocket doors lead to parlors on the north. All the rooms on the first floor have their original plaster cornices and projecting Greek Revival moldings and architraves. The second floor's rooms are more restrained.

== History ==
The house was built in 1850, when Italian-villa style houses were at the peak of their popularity. The Kenyon House is typical of the center-gable version, which does not include a tower. In 1870 it was listed as the property of Kenyon, a local lawyer and businessman who had served a single term in Congress a decade earlier. It has remained a private residence since, with little alteration save the modern addition in the rear.

== See also ==
- National Register of Historic Places listings in Ulster County, New York
