= Peter H. Silvester =

American politician (1807-1882)

Peter Henry Silvester
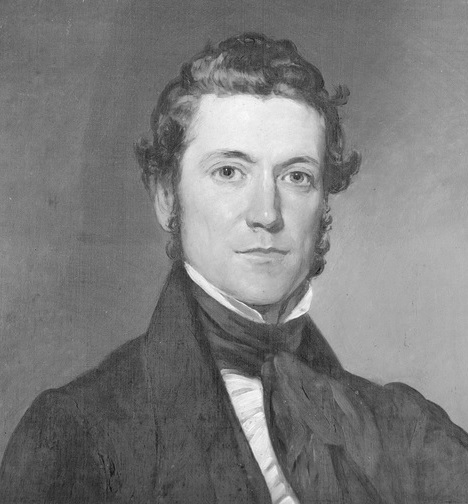

Member of the U.S. House of Representatives from 's New York's 11th district
- In office March 4, 1847 – March 3, 1851
- Preceded by: John F. Collin
- Succeeded by: Josiah Sutherland

Personal details
- Born: February 17, 1807 Kinderhook, New York
- Died: November 29, 1882 (aged 75) Coxsackie, New York
- Party: Whig
- Spouse: Catherine Susan Bronk
- Relations: Peter Silvester (grandfather)
- Children: Francis Silvester; John L.B. Silvester
- Parent(s): Francis Silvester; Lydia Van Schaack
- Education: Kinderhook Academy
- Alma mater: Union College
- Profession: Lawyer, Politician

Peter Henry Silvester (February 17, 1807 – November 29, 1882) was a U.S. representative from New York in the 30th and 31st United States Congress. Silvester was the grandson of attorney and U.S. congressmen, Peter Silvester.

== Early life ==
Silvester was born on February 17, 1807, in Kinderhook, New York. He was the only son of Francis Silvester (1767–1845) and Lydia Van Schaack, a niece of Peter van Schaack and a descendant of the Schuyler family. He was the grandson of Peter Silvester (1734–1808) and his wife, Jane Van Schaack. Silvester attended Kinderhook Academy, and graduated from Union College, Schenectady, New York, in 1827. He studied law, was admitted to the bar in 1830 and practiced in Coxsackie, New York.

== Career ==
He was originally a member of the Democratic-Republican Party, and joined the National Republicans and then the Whigs.

Silvester was elected as a Whig to the Thirtieth and Thirty-first Congresses (March 4, 1847 – March 3, 1851). He did not run for reelection in 1850 and resumed practicing law. Like most Whigs, Silvester became a Republican when the party was organized in the mid-1850s. In 1860 he was an unsuccessful candidate for the U.S. House, losing narrowly to John B. Steele.

== Personal life ==
Silvester married Catherine Susan Bronk (d. 1858), the daughter of John Leonard Bronk and Alida Conine, and born in Coxsackie. She attended Troy Seminary in Troy New York. Her father was a lawyer and Columbia College graduate. Together, Silvester and Bronk had four children, of which two survived to adulthood:

- Francis Silvester (1833–1903), a lawyer who served as District Attorney of Columbia County.
- John L.B. Silvester (c. 1836)
- Margaret Silvester, died aged 9

Silvester later retired to one of his farms in Coxsackie, where he lived until his death on November 29, 1882. He was interred in Kinderhook Cemetery, along with his family.

U.S. House of Representatives
Preceded by John F. Collin	Member of the U.S. House of Representatives from New York's 11th congressional district March 4, 1847–March 3, 1851	Succeeded by Josiah Sutherland
