= New York's 11th congressional district =

U.S. House district for New York

Coordinates: 40°34′01″N 74°07′35″W

- Interactive map of district boundaries since January 3, 2023
- Representative: Nicole Malliotakis; R–Staten Island
- Population (2025): 765,161
- Median household income: $90,153
- Ethnicity: 51.4% White; 20.6% Asian; 18.3% Hispanic; 6.5% Black; 2.4% Two or more races; 0.7% other
- Cook PVI: R+10

New York's 11th congressional district is a congressional district for the United States House of Representatives in New York City. The 11th district includes all of Staten Island and parts of southern Brooklyn, including the neighborhoods of Bay Ridge, Bath Beach, Dyker Heights, south western Gravesend, western Sheepshead Bay, and parts of southern Bensonhurst. The 11th district is currently represented by Republican Nicole Malliotakis, who is currently the only Republican representing any part of New York City in Congress. Malliotakis was first elected in 2020, defeating one-term incumbent Democrat Max Rose.

The district's character is very different from the rest of New York City, being the only district in the city that leans toward the Republican Party in national elections. With a PVI (Partisan Voting Index) of R+10, it is one of the most Republican urban districts in the country. It was the only New York City-based district carried by Donald Trump in 2020, who won it with 55 percent of the vote to Democratic opponent Joe Biden's 44 percent.

This district is also the smallest United States congressional district by land area to be represented by a Republican.

== Demographics ==
According to the APM Research Lab's Voter Profile Tools (featuring the U.S. Census Bureau's 2019 American Community Survey), the district contained about 499,000 potential voters (citizens, age 18+). Of these, 64% are White, 15% Latino, 12% Black, and 8% Asian. Immigrants make up 29% of the district's potential voters. The district has significant Arab-American, Italian-American, Jewish, Irish-American, and Russian-American populations. Median income among households (with one or more potential voter) in the district is about $85,200. As for the educational attainment of potential voters in the district, 10% of those 25 and older have not earned a high school degree, while 38% hold a bachelor's or higher degree.

== History ==
Prior to the 2012 redistricting, most of the territory currently located in the 11th district had been located in New York's 13th congressional district, while the 11th district was located entirely in Brooklyn and had a majority African-American population. Most of the territory located within the old 11th district is now located in New York's 9th congressional district. The old 11th district was the subject of The Colbert Report's Better Know a District segment on December 15, 2005, and September 4, 2012.

=== January 2026 redistricting lawsuit ===
New York County acting Supreme Court Justice Jeffrey Pearlman ruled that the map of New York's 11th congressional district (NY-11) is unconstitutional in mid-January 2026. The New York State's Independent Redistricting Commission will redraw the map by February 6, 2026 (before the 2026 primary election day for congressional candidates); the New York State Legislature has to approve the new map. Areas of New York's 10th congressional district will be swapped to accomplish certifying the new map for NY-11. In October 2025, four Staten Island residents filed a lawsuit citing that the district lines prevent voters of color (people of indigenous and/or Black African and/or Spanish-speaking ancestry) who are registered Democrats and vote Democrat living along the border of the district in Brooklyn and people living on Staten Island from electing Democrats or a candidate of color within NY-11. The decision by Acting Justice Pearlman to declare the district's lines unconstitutional was upheld by the intermediate appeals court in February 2026. However, the Supreme Court of the United States blocked the redistricting attempt on March 2, keeping the district intact.

== Current composition ==
The current 11th district includes the entirety of the New York City borough of Staten Island and part of the borough of Brooklyn. Brooklyn neighborhoods in the district include:

- Bath Beach
- Bay Ridge
- Bensonhurst
- Dyker Heights
- Western Gravesend

== Recent election results from statewide races ==
Year	Office	Results
2008	President	McCain 50% - 49%
2012	President	Obama 53% - 47%
2016	President	Trump 52% - 44%
2016	Senate	Schumer 64% - 34%
2018	Senate	Gillibrand 55% - 45%
2018	Governor	Cuomo 53% - 45%
2018	Attorney General	James 52% - 46%
2020	President	Trump 53% - 46%
2022	Senate	Pinion 60% - 40%
2022	Governor	Zeldin 64% - 36%
2022	Attorney General	Henry 63% - 37%
2022	Comptroller	Rodríguez 61% - 39%
2024	President	Trump 61% - 37%
2024	Senate	Sapraicone 58% - 41%

== List of members representing the district ==
Representative	Party	Years	Cong ress	Electoral history	Geography
District established March 4, 1803
Beriah Palmer (Ballston Spa)	Democratic-Republican	March 4, 1803 – March 3, 1805	8th	Elected in 1802. Retired.	1803–1811; Clinton, Essex and Saratoga counties
Peter Sailly (Plattsburgh)	Democratic-Republican	March 4, 1805 – March 3, 1807	9th	Elected in 1804. Retired.	1803–1811; Clinton, Essex and Saratoga counties
John Thompson (Stillwater)	Democratic-Republican	March 4, 1807 – March 3, 1809	10th	Elected in 1806. Redistricted to the 8th district.	1803–1811; Clinton, Essex and Saratoga counties
Thomas R. Gold (Whitestown)	Federalist	March 4, 1809 – March 3, 1813	11th 12th	Elected in 1808. Re-elected in 1810. Lost re-election.	1803–1811; Clinton, Essex and Saratoga counties
Thomas R. Gold (Whitestown)	Federalist	March 4, 1809 – March 3, 1813	11th 12th	Elected in 1808. Re-elected in 1810. Lost re-election.	1811–1813; Clinton, Essex, Franklin and Saratoga counties
John W. Taylor (Ballston Spa)	Democratic-Republican	March 4, 1813 – March 3, 1823	13th 14th 15th 16th 17th	Elected in 1812. Re-elected in 1814. Re-elected in 1816. Re-elected in 1818. Re-elected in 1821. Redistricted to the 17th district.	1813–1823; Saratoga County
Charles A. Foote (Delhi)	Crawford Democratic-Republican	March 4, 1823 – March 3, 1825	18th	Elected in 1822. [data missing]	1823–1833; Delaware and Greene counties
Henry Ashley (Catskill)	Jacksonian	March 4, 1825 – March 3, 1827	19th	Elected in 1824. Retired.	1823–1833; Delaware and Greene counties
Selah R. Hobbie (Delhi)	Jacksonian	March 4, 1827 – March 3, 1829	20th	Elected in 1826. Retired.	1823–1833; Delaware and Greene counties
Perkins King (Freehold)	Jacksonian	March 4, 1829 – March 3, 1831	21st	Elected in 1828. Retired.	1823–1833; Delaware and Greene counties
Erastus Root (Delhi)	Jacksonian	March 4, 1831 – March 3, 1833	22nd	Elected in 1830. [data missing]	1823–1833; Delaware and Greene counties
John Cramer (Waterford)	Jacksonian	March 4, 1833 – March 3, 1837	23rd 24th	Elected in 1832. Re-elected in 1834. [data missing]	1833–1843; Schenectady and Saratoga counties
John I. De Graff (Schenectady)	Democratic	March 4, 1837 – March 3, 1839	25th	Elected in 1836. Retired.	1833–1843; Schenectady and Saratoga counties
Anson Brown (Ballston)	Whig	March 4, 1839 – June 14, 1840	26th	Elected in 1838. Died.	1833–1843; Schenectady and Saratoga counties
Vacant		June 14, 1840 – December 7, 1840	26th		1833–1843; Schenectady and Saratoga counties
Nicholas B. Doe (Waterford)	Whig	December 7, 1840 – March 3, 1841	26th	Elected to finish Brown's term.	1833–1843; Schenectady and Saratoga counties
Archibald L. Linn (Schenectady)	Whig	March 4, 1841 – March 3, 1843	27th	Elected in 1840. Lost re-election to Chesselden Ellis in 16th district after redistricting.	1833–1843; Schenectady and Saratoga counties
Zadock Pratt (Prattsville)	Democratic	March 4, 1843 – March 3, 1845	28th	Elected in 1842. Retired.	1843–1853; Columbia and Greene counties
John F. Collin (Hillsdale)	Democratic	March 4, 1845 – March 3, 1847	29th	Elected in 1844. Retired.	1843–1853; Columbia and Greene counties
Peter H. Silvester (Coxsackie)	Whig	March 4, 1847 – March 3, 1851	30th 31st	Elected in 1846. Re-elected in 1848. Retired.	1843–1853; Columbia and Greene counties
Josiah Sutherland (Hudson)	Democratic	March 4, 1851 – March 3, 1853	32nd	Elected in 1850. Retired.	1843–1853; Columbia and Greene counties
Theodoric R. Westbrook (Kingston)	Democratic	March 4, 1853 – March 3, 1855	33rd	Elected in 1852. Retired.	1853–1863; Ulster County, New York and Greene County, New York
Rufus H. King (Catskill)	Opposition	March 4, 1855 – March 3, 1857	34th	Elected in 1854. Retired.	1853–1863; Ulster County, New York and Greene County, New York
William F. Russell (Saugerties)	Democratic	March 4, 1857 – March 3, 1859	35th	Elected in 1856. Retired; subsequently appointed Naval Officer of the Port of New York	1853–1863; Ulster County, New York and Greene County, New York
William S. Kenyon (Kingston)	Republican	March 4, 1859 – March 3, 1861	36th	Elected in 1858. Retired.	1853–1863; Ulster County, New York and Greene County, New York
John B. Steele (Kingston)	Democratic	March 4, 1861 – March 3, 1863	37th	Elected in 1860. Redistricted to the 13th district.	1853–1863; Ulster County, New York and Greene County, New York
Charles H. Winfield (Goshen)	Democratic	March 4, 1863 – March 3, 1867	38th 39th	Elected in 1862. Re-elected in 1864. Retired.	1863–1873; Orange and Sullivan counties
Charles Van Wyck (Middletown)	Republican	March 4, 1867 – March 3, 1869	40th	Elected in 1866. Lost re-election.	1863–1873; Orange and Sullivan counties
George W. Greene (Goshen)	Democratic	March 4, 1869 – February 17, 1870	41st	Replaced by Charles H. Van Wyck, who successfully contested election	1863–1873; Orange and Sullivan counties
Charles Van Wyck (Middletown)	Republican	February 17, 1870 – March 3, 1871	41st	Successfully challenged election of George W. Greene.	1863–1873; Orange and Sullivan counties
Charles St. John (Port Jervis)	Republican	March 4, 1871 – March 3, 1873	42nd	Elected in 1870. Redistricted to the 12th district.	1863–1873; Orange and Sullivan counties
Clarkson N. Potter (New Rochelle)	Democratic	March 4, 1873 – March 3, 1875	43rd	Redistricted from the 10th district and re-elected in 1872. [data missing]	1873–1875; Bronx and Westchester County
Benjamin A. Willis (New York)	Democratic	March 4, 1875 – March 3, 1879	44th 45th	Elected in 1874. Re-elected in 1876. [data missing]	1875–1883; Harlem and central Manhattan
Levi P. Morton (New York)	Republican	March 4, 1879 – March 21, 1881	46th 47th	Elected in 1878. Re-elected in 1880. Resigned to become US Minister to France	1875–1883; Harlem and central Manhattan
Vacant		March 21, 1881 – November 8, 1881	47th		1875–1883; Harlem and central Manhattan
Roswell P. Flower (New York)	Democratic	November 8, 1881 – March 3, 1883	47th	Elected to finish Morton's term. [data missing]	1875–1883; Harlem and central Manhattan
Orlando B. Potter (New York)	Democratic	March 4, 1883 – March 3, 1885	48th	Elected in 1882. [data missing]	1883–1893; West Central Manhattan
Truman A. Merriman (New York)	Independent Democrat	March 4, 1885 – March 3, 1887	49th 50th	Elected in 1884. Re-elected in 1886. [data missing]	1883–1893; West Central Manhattan
Truman A. Merriman (New York)	Democratic	March 4, 1887 – March 3, 1889	49th 50th	Elected in 1884. Re-elected in 1886. [data missing]	1883–1893; West Central Manhattan
John Quinn (New York)	Democratic	March 4, 1889 – March 3, 1891	51st	Elected in 1888. [data missing]	1883–1893; West Central Manhattan
John De Witt Warner (New York)	Democratic	March 4, 1891 – March 3, 1893	52nd	Elected in 1890. Redistricted to the 13th district.	1883–1893; West Central Manhattan
Amos J. Cummings (New York)	Democratic	March 4, 1893 – November 21, 1894	53rd	Redistricted from the 9th district and re-elected in 1892. Resigned.	1893–1903; Lower East Side of Manhattan (part)
William Sulzer (New York)	Democratic	March 4, 1895 – March 3, 1903	54th 55th 56th 57th	Elected in 1894. Re-elected in 1896. Re-elected in 1898. Re-elected in 1900. Redistricted to the 10th district.	1893–1903; Lower East Side of Manhattan (part)
William Randolph Hearst (New York)	Democratic	March 4, 1903 – March 3, 1907	58th 59th	Elected in 1902. Re-elected in 1904. [data missing]	1903–1913; Part of Central west Manhattan
Charles V. Fornes (New York)	Democratic	March 4, 1907 – March 3, 1913	60th 61st 62nd	Elected in 1906. Re-elected in 1908. Re-elected in 1910. [data missing]	1903–1913; Part of Central west Manhattan
Daniel J. Riordan (New York)	Democratic	March 4, 1913 – April 28, 1923	63rd 64th 65th 66th 67th 68th	Redistricted from the 8th district and re-elected in 1912. Re-elected in 1914. Re-elected in 1916. Re-elected in 1918. Re-elected in 1920. Re-elected in 1922. Died.	1913–1933; All of Staten Island, Parts of Manhattan
Vacant		April 28, 1923 – November 6, 1923	68th		1913–1933; All of Staten Island, Parts of Manhattan
Anning Smith Prall (Staten Island)	Democratic	November 6, 1923 – January 3, 1935	68th 69th 70th 71st 72nd 73rd	Elected to finish Riordan's term. Re-elected in 1924. Re-elected in 1926. Re-elected in 1928. Re-elected in 1930. Re-elected in 1932. [data missing]	1913–1933; All of Staten Island, Parts of Manhattan
James A. O'Leary (Staten Island)	Democratic	January 3, 1935 – March 16, 1944	74th 75th 76th 77th 78th	Elected in 1934. Re-elected in 1936. Re-elected in 1938. Re-elected in 1940. Re-elected in 1942. Died.	1913–1933; All of Staten Island, Parts of Manhattan
Vacant		March 16, 1944 – June 6, 1944	78th		1913–1933; All of Staten Island, Parts of Manhattan
Ellsworth B. Buck (Staten Island)	Republican	June 6, 1944 – January 3, 1945	78th	Elected to finish O'Leary's term. Redistricted to the 16th district.	1913–1933; All of Staten Island, Parts of Manhattan
James J. Heffernan (Brooklyn)	Democratic	January 3, 1945 – January 3, 1953	79th 80th 81st 82nd	Redistricted from the 5th district and re-elected in 1944. Re-elected in 1946. Re-elected in 1948. Re-elected in 1950. [data missing]	Until 1953; Parts of Brooklyn
Emanuel Celler (Brooklyn)	Democratic	January 3, 1953 – January 3, 1963	83rd 84th 85th 86th 87th	Redistricted from the 15th district and re-elected in 1952. Re-elected in 1954. Re-elected in 1956. Re-elected in 1958. Re-elected in 1960. Redistricted to the 10th district.	1953–1963; Parts of Brooklyn, Queens
Eugene J. Keogh (Brooklyn)	Democratic	January 3, 1963 – January 3, 1967	88th 89th	Redistricted from the 9th district and re-elected in 1962. Re-elected in 1964..	1963–1973; Parts of Brooklyn
Frank J. Brasco (Brooklyn)	Democratic	January 3, 1967 – January 3, 1975	90th 91st 92nd 93rd	Elected in 1966. Re-elected in 1968. Re-elected in 1970. Re-elected in 1972. [data missing]	1963–1973; Parts of Brooklyn
Frank J. Brasco (Brooklyn)	Democratic	January 3, 1967 – January 3, 1975	90th 91st 92nd 93rd	Elected in 1966. Re-elected in 1968. Re-elected in 1970. Re-elected in 1972. [data missing]	Until 1983; Parts of Brooklyn, Queens
James H. Scheuer (Queens)	Democratic	January 3, 1975 – January 3, 1983	94th 95th 96th 97th	Elected in 1974. Re-elected in 1976. Re-elected in 1978. Re-elected in 1980. Redistricted to the 8th district.	Until 1983; Parts of Brooklyn, Queens
Edolphus Towns (Brooklyn)	Democratic	January 3, 1983 – January 3, 1993	98th 99th 100th 101st 102nd	Elected in 1982. Re-elected in 1984. Re-elected in 1986. Re-elected in 1988. Re-elected in 1990. Redistricted to the 10th district.	1983–2003; Parts of Brooklyn
Major Owens (Brooklyn)	Democratic	January 3, 1993 – January 3, 2007	103rd 104th 105th 106th 107th 108th 109th	Redistricted from the 12th district and re-elected in 1992. Re-elected in 1994. Re-elected in 1996. Re-elected in 1998. Re-elected in 2000. Re-elected in 2002. Re-elected in 2004. Retired.	1983–2003; Parts of Brooklyn
Major Owens (Brooklyn)	Democratic	January 3, 1993 – January 3, 2007	103rd 104th 105th 106th 107th 108th 109th	Redistricted from the 12th district and re-elected in 1992. Re-elected in 1994. Re-elected in 1996. Re-elected in 1998. Re-elected in 2000. Re-elected in 2002. Re-elected in 2004. Retired.	2003–2013 Parts of Brooklyn
Yvette Clarke (Brooklyn)	Democratic	January 3, 2007 – January 3, 2013	110th 111th 112th	Elected in 2006. Re-elected in 2008. Re-elected in 2010. Redistricted to the 9th district.	2003–2013 Parts of Brooklyn
Michael Grimm (Staten Island)	Republican	January 3, 2013 – January 5, 2015	113th 114th	Redistricted from the 13th district and re-elected in 2012. Re-elected in 2014. Resigned.	2013–2023 Staten Island and parts of Brooklyn
Vacant		January 5, 2015 – May 5, 2015	114th		2013–2023 Staten Island and parts of Brooklyn
Dan Donovan (Staten Island)	Republican	May 5, 2015 – January 3, 2019	114th 115th	Elected to finish Grimm's term. Re-elected in 2016. Lost re-election.	2013–2023 Staten Island and parts of Brooklyn
Max Rose (Staten Island)	Democratic	January 3, 2019 – January 3, 2021	116th	Elected in 2018. Lost re-election.	2013–2023 Staten Island and parts of Brooklyn
Nicole Malliotakis (Staten Island)	Republican	January 3, 2021 – present	117th 118th 119th	Elected in 2020. Re-elected in 2022. Re-elected in 2024. Re-elected in 2026.	2013–2023 Staten Island and parts of Brooklyn
Nicole Malliotakis (Staten Island)	Republican	January 3, 2021 – present	117th 118th 119th	Elected in 2020. Re-elected in 2022. Re-elected in 2024. Re-elected in 2026.	2023–2025 Staten Island and parts of Brooklyn
Nicole Malliotakis (Staten Island)	Republican	January 3, 2021 – present	117th 118th 119th	Elected in 2020. Re-elected in 2022. Re-elected in 2024. Re-elected in 2026.	2025–present Staten Island and parts of Brooklyn

== Election results ==
In New York State there are numerous minor parties at various points on the political spectrum. Certain parties will invariably endorse either the Republican or Democratic candidate for every office, hence the state electoral results contain both the party votes, and the final candidate votes (Listed as "Recap"). (See Electoral fusion § New York.)

1996 election
Party	Candidate	Votes	%	±%
Democratic	Major Owens (incumbent)	89,905	92.0	+24.9
Republican	Claudette Hayle	7,866	8.0	+0.8
Majority		82,039	83.9	
Turnout		97,771	100.0	

1998 election
Party	Candidate	Votes	%	±%
Democratic	Major Owens (incumbent)	75,773	90.0	−2.0
Republican	David Greene	7,284	8.7	+0.7
Independence	Phyllis Taliaferro	1,144	1.4	+1.4
Majority		68,489	81.3	−2.6
Turnout		84,201		−13.9

2000 election
Party	Candidate	Votes	%	±%
Democratic	Major Owens (incumbent)	112,050	87.0	−3.0
Republican	Susan Cleary	8,406	6.5	−2.2
Liberal	Una S.T. Clarke	7,366	5.7	+5.7
Conservative	Cartrell Gore	962	0.7	+0.7
Majority		103,644	80.5	−0.8
Turnout		128,784		+52.9

2002 election
Party	Candidate	Votes	%	±%
Democratic	Major Owens (incumbent)	76,917	86.6	−0.4
Republican	Susan Cleary	11,149	12.5	+6.0
Conservative	Alice Gaffney	798	0.9	+0.2
Majority		65,768	74.0	−6.5
Turnout		88,864	100.0	−31.0

2004 election
Party	Candidate	Votes	%	±%
Democratic	Major Owens (incumbent)	144,999	94.0	+7.4
Independence	Lorraine Stevens	4,721	3.1	+3.1
Conservative	Sol Lieberman	4,478	2.9	+2.0
Majority		140,278	91.0	+17.0
Turnout		154,198	100.0	+73.5

2006 election
Party	Candidate	Votes	%	±%
Democratic	Yvette Clarke	88,334	90.0	−4.0
Republican	Stephen Finger	7,447	7.6	+7.6
Conservative	Marianna Blume	1,325	1.4	−1.5
Freedom	Ollie M. McClean	996	1.0	+1.0
Majority		80,887	82.5	−8.5
Turnout		98,102	100.0	−36.4

2008 election
Party	Candidate	Votes	%	±%
Democratic	Yvette Clarke (incumbent)	168,562	92.8	+2.8
Republican	Hugh C. Carr	11,644	6.4	−1.2
Conservative	Cartrell Gore	1,517	0.8	−0.6
Majority		156,918	86.4	+3.9
Turnout		181,723	100.0	+85.2

2010 election
Party	Candidate	Votes	%	±%
Democratic	Yvette Clarke (incumbent)	104,297	90.6	−2.2
Republican	Hugh C. Carr	10,858	9.4	+3.0
Majority		93,439	81.1	−5.3
Turnout		115,155	100.0	−36.6

2015 special election
Party	Candidate	Votes	%	±%
Republican	Daniel M. Donovan	23,409	58.7	+49.3
Democratic	Vincent Gentile	15,808	39.4	−51.2
Turnout		42,569	100.0	

2016 election
Party	Candidate	Votes	%	±%
Republican	Daniel M. Donovan (incumbent)	134,366	62.2	+3.5
Democratic	Richard Reichard	78,066	36.1	−3.5
Turnout		216,023	100.0	

2018 election
Party	Candidate	Votes	%	±%
Democratic	Max Rose	101,823	53.0	+16.9
Republican	Daniel M. Donovan (Incumbent)	89,441	46.6	−16.9
Democratic gain from Republican				

2020 election
Party	Candidate	Votes	%	±%
Republican	Nicole Malliotakis	155,608	53.2	+6.4
Democratic	Max Rose (Incumbent)	137,198	46.8	−6.2
Republican gain from Democratic		Swing	+12.6	

2022 election
Party	Candidate	Votes	%	±%
Republican	Nicole Malliotakis (Incumbent)	115,992	61.8	+8.6
Democratic	Max Rose	71,801	38.2	−8.6
Republican hold		Swing	+17.2	

2024 election
Party	Candidate	Votes	%	±%
Republican	Nicole Malliotakis (Incumbent)	167,099	64.1	+2.3
Democratic	Andrea Morse	93,586	35.9	−2.3
Republican hold		Swing	+4.6	

== See also ==
- List of United States congressional districts
- New York's congressional delegations
- New York's congressional districts
