= George Woodward Greene =

American politician

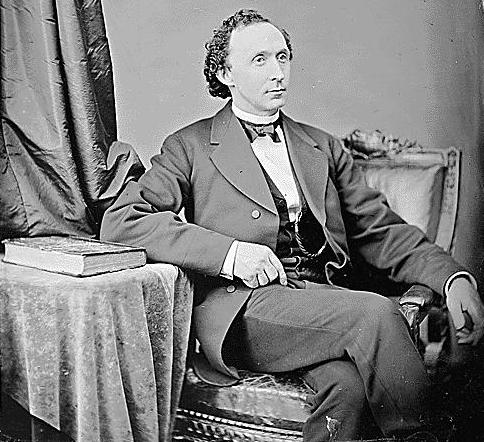

Member of the New York Assembly from the 2nd district
- In office 1885–1890
- Preceded by: Jacob H. Dimmick
- Succeeded by: Michael N. Kane

Member of the U.S. House of Representatives from New York's 11th district
- In office March 4, 1869 – February 17, 1870
- Preceded by: Charles Van Wyck
- Succeeded by: Charles Van Wyck

Personal details
- Born: July 4, 1831 Mount Hope, New York, U.S.
- Died: July 21, 1895 (aged 64) New York City, U.S.
- Resting place: The Plains Cemetery
- Party: Republican

George Woodward Greene (July 4, 1831 – July 21, 1895) was an American lawyer, jurist, and politician who served part of one term as a U.S. representative from New York from 1869 to 1870.

== Biography ==
Born in Mount Hope, New York, Greene pursued classical studies and graduated from the University of Pennsylvania. He taught at a school and studied law; in 1860, he was admitted to the bar and commenced practice in Goshen, New York.

He became a school commissioner for Orange County, and he served as judge of the Orange County Courts from 1861 to 1864.

=== Congress and contested election ===
Greene presented credentials as a Democratic Member-elect to the Forty-first Congress and served from March 4, 1869, to February 17, 1870, when he was succeeded by Charles H. Van Wyck, who contested his election.

=== State legislature ===
He was a member of the New York State Assembly (Orange Co., 2nd D.) from 1885 to 1890.

=== Death ===
Greene died in New York City on July 21, 1895. He was interred in "The Plains" Cemetery, Otisville, New York.

U.S. House of Representatives
Preceded by Charles Van Wyck	Member of the U.S. House of Representatives from New York's 11th congressional district 1869–1870	Succeeded by Charles Van Wyck
New York State Assembly
Preceded by Jacob H. Dimmick	New York State Assembly; Orange County, 2nd District; 1885–1890	Succeeded by Michael N. Kane
