= Hillsdale Hamlet Historic District =

Historic district in New York, United States

- U.S. National Register of Historic Places
- U.S. Historic district
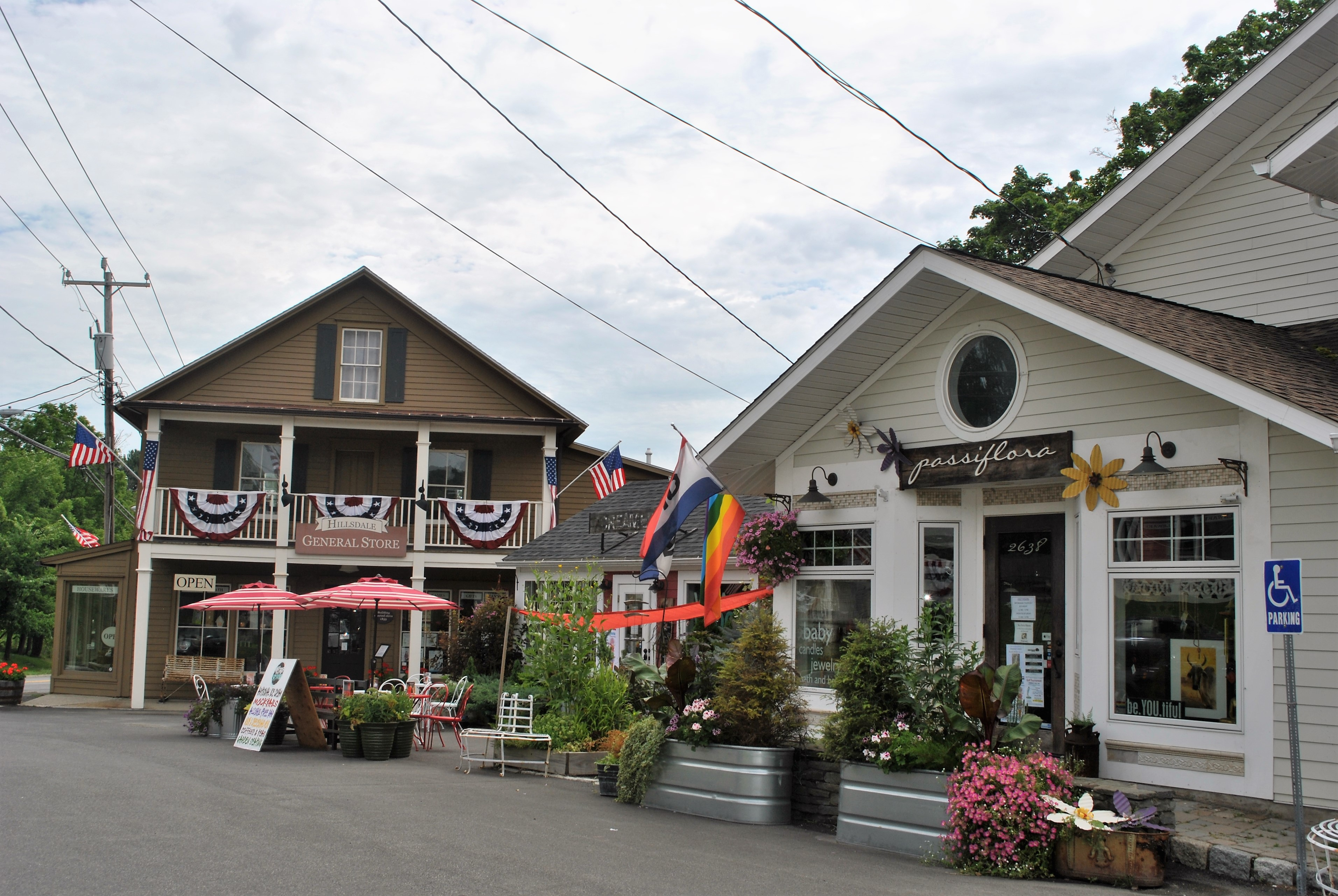
- Hillsdale General Store

- Location within New York Location within the United States
- Location: NY-22 and NY-23, Anthony, Cold Water and Maple Sts., Old Town and Pill Hill Rds., Hillsdale, New York
- Coordinates: 42°10′47.57″N 73°31′17.89″W
- Area: 75 acres (30 ha)
- NRHP reference No.: 09001283
- Added to NRHP: January 27, 2010

Hillsdale Hamlet Historic District is a national historic district located at Hillsdale in Columbia County, New York. The district includes 128 contributing buildings, five contributing sites, and two contributing objects. It encompasses the historic core of the hamlet of Hillsdale.

It was listed on the National Register of Historic Places in 2010.

== Gallery ==
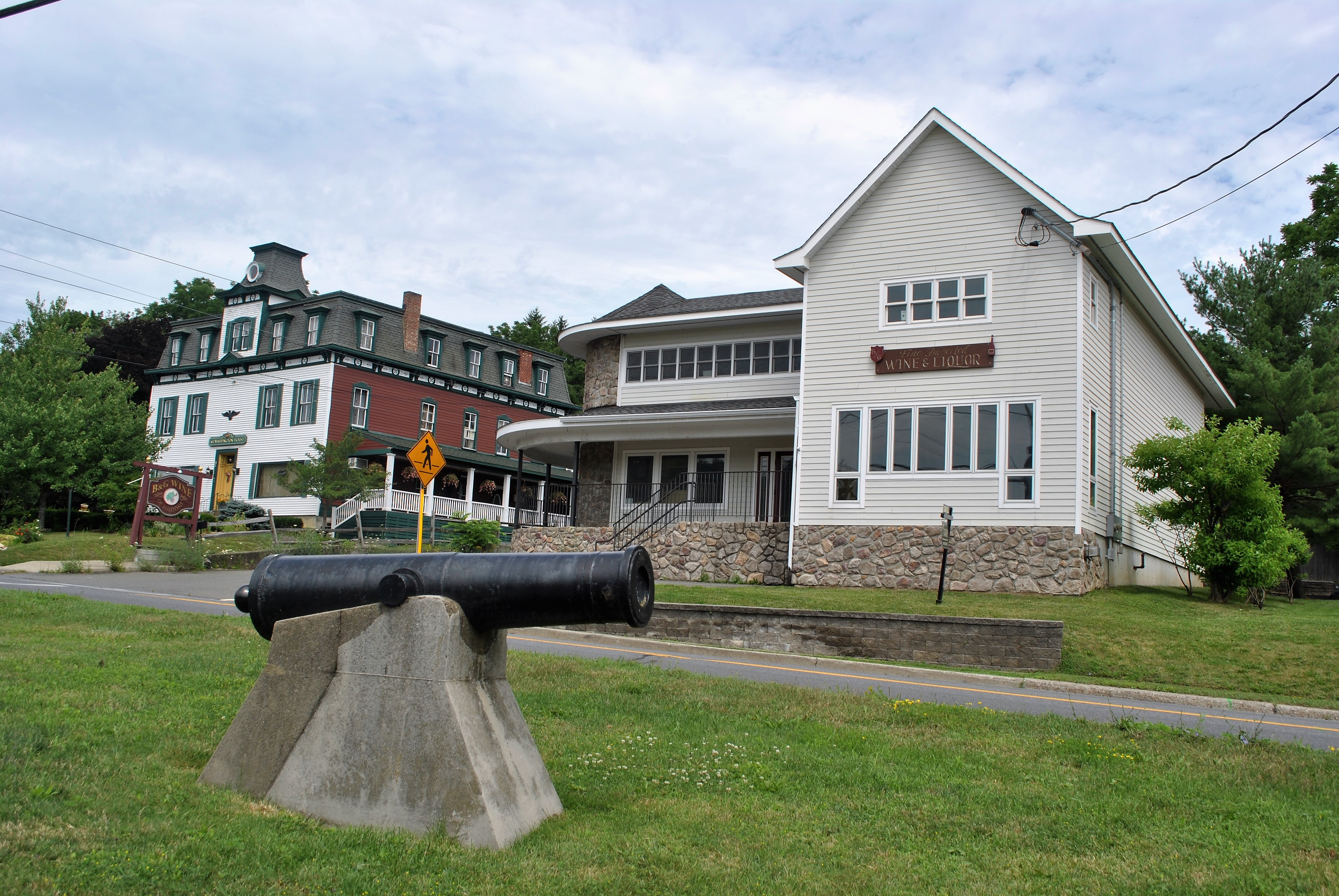

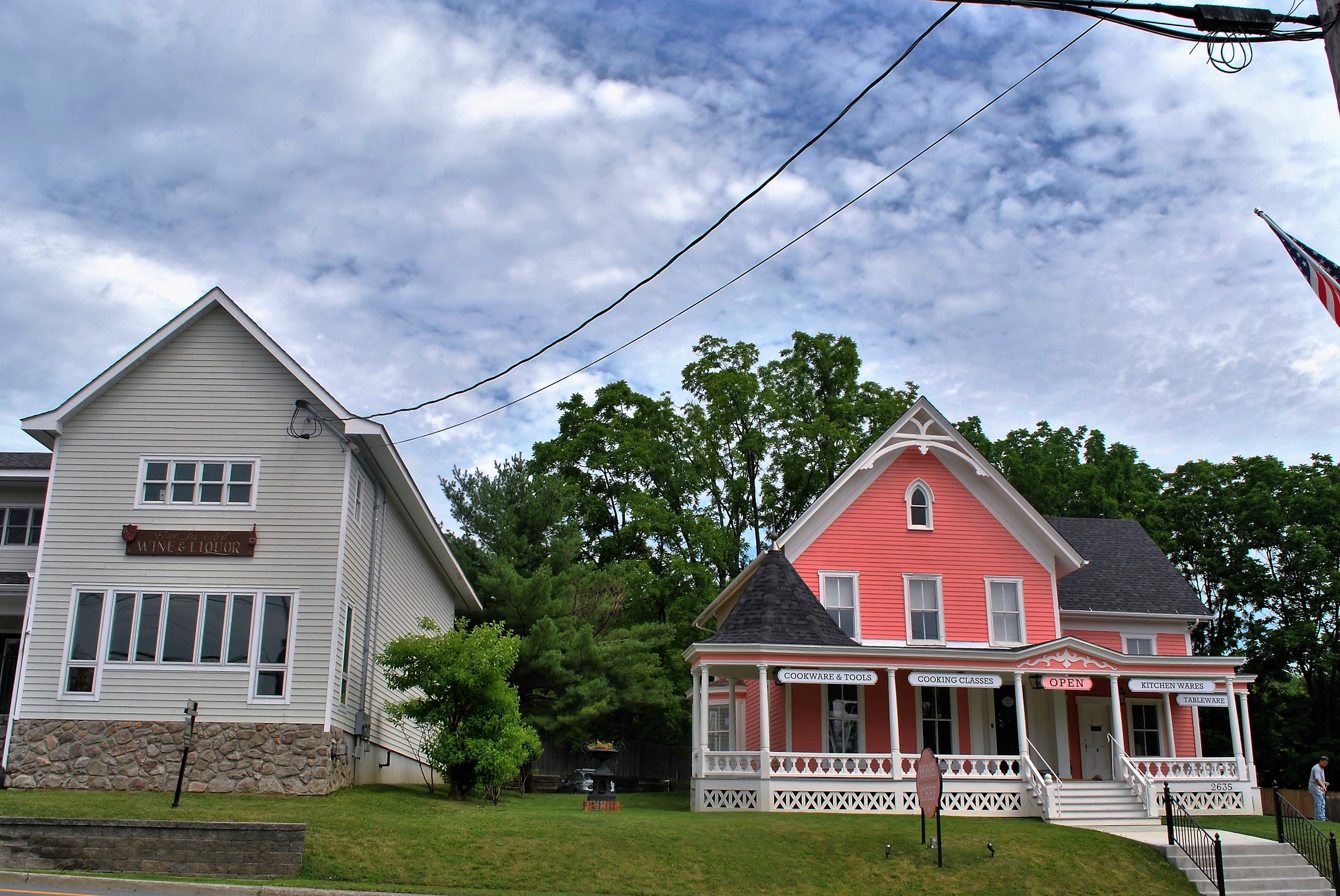

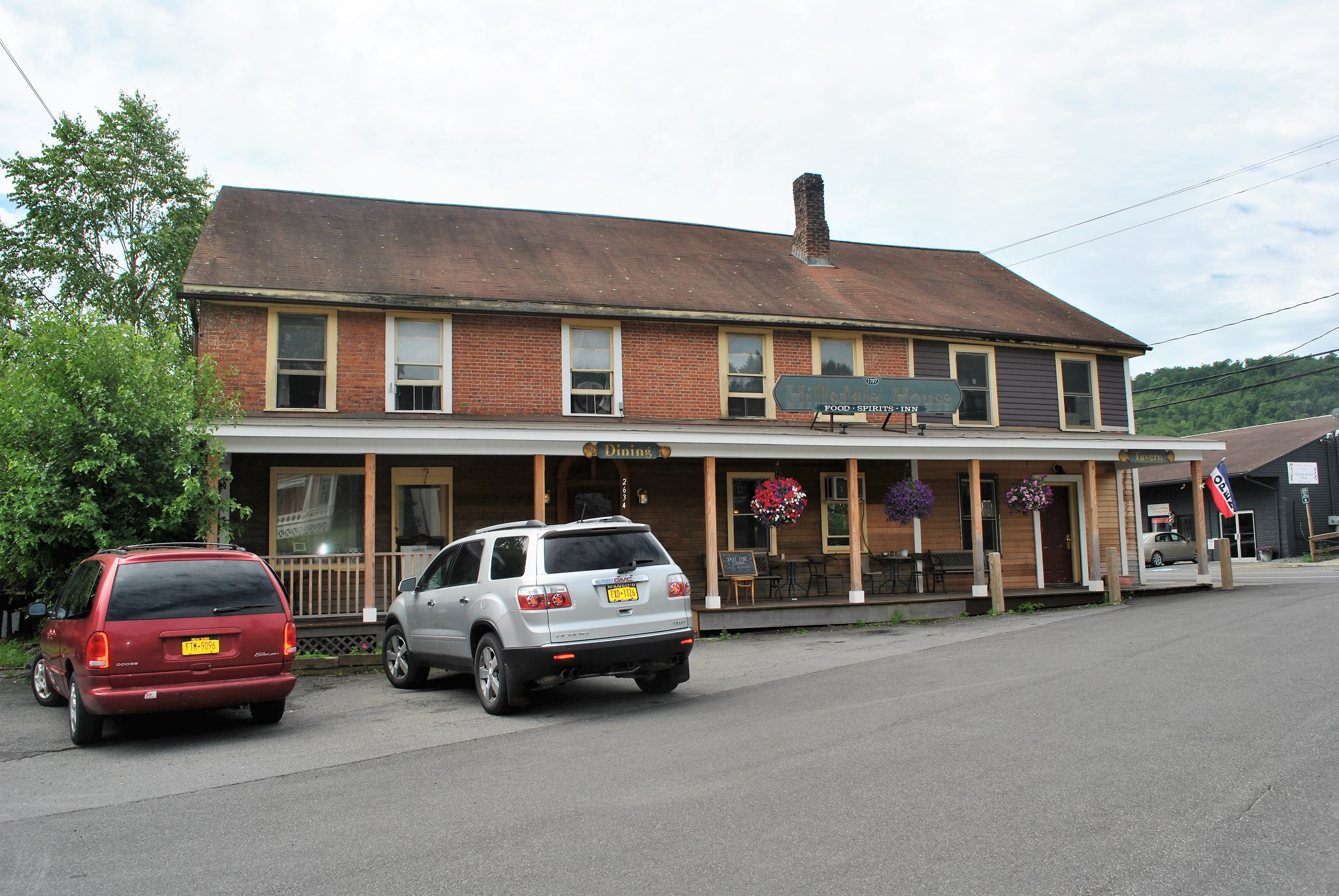
