= John Quinn (New York politician) =

American politician

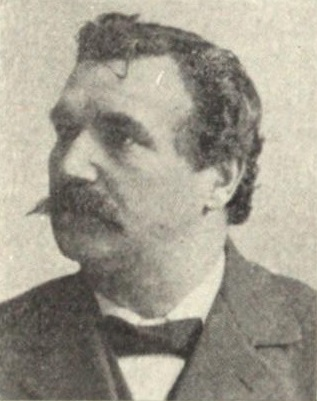
John Quinn, Congressman from New York

John Quinn (Irish: Seán Ó Cuinn) (August 9, 1839 – February 23, 1903) was an American businessman and politician who served one term as a U.S. representative from New York from 1889 to 1891.

== Life ==
Quinn was born in County Tipperary, Ireland, immigrated to the United States in 1866, and settled in Manhattan, New York City. He engaged in the real estate and building business. He was president of the West Side Electric Light & Power Company and was one of the founders and a director of the Homestead Bank of New York.

=== Political career ===
Quinn was a member of the New York State Assembly (New York Co., 17th D.) in 1883; and was a member of the board of aldermen in 1885–1887. He was a delegate to the Democratic National Convention in 1884 and 1888.

==== Congress ====
Quinn was elected as a Democrat to the Fifty-first Congress (March 4, 1889 – March 3, 1891).

=== Death ===
Quinn died in New York City on February 23, 1903, at the age of 63, he is interred in Calvary Cemetery, Woodside, New York.

New York State Assembly
Preceded by Michael J. Costello	New York State Assembly; New York County, 17th District; 1883	Succeeded by Richard J. Lewis
U.S. House of Representatives
Preceded by Truman A. Merriman	Member of the U.S. House of Representatives from New York's 11th congressional district 1889–1891	Succeeded by John De Witt Warner
