= Edwin N. Hubbell =

American politician

Edwin Nelson Hubbell (August 13, 1815 – February 5, 1897) was an American politician in New York and Michigan who served one term in the United States House of Representatives from 1865 to 1867.

== Biography ==
Hubbell was born in Coxsackie, Greene County, New York on August 13, 1815, the son of Nathan Hubbell and Edith (Mead) Hubbell. He was educated in Coxsackie and became a farmer and an active member of the Greene County and New York State Agricultural Societies. He was also active in business, including operating a brick making factory and serving on the Board of Trustees of the Coxsackie Savings Bank.

=== Family ===
He married Catharine Conel (or Conine) in 1836. After her death, in 1868 he married Catharine Elizabeth Stoutenburg Hoffman.

=== Political career ===
A Democrat, from 1857 to 1860 he served as Coxsackie's Town Supervisor. He was also a member of the Greene County Board of Supervisors, of which he was chairman in 1859. In 1864 he ran successfully for the U.S. House seat representing the 13th congressional district of New York. He served one term, in the 39th Congress (March 4, 1865 – March 3, 1867), and was not a candidate for reelection.

=== Later career ===
In 1876 Hubbell's business failed, and he moved to East Saginaw, Michigan, where he worked as a clerk at a lumber company from 1883 to 1887. He served as Assistant City Treasurer from 1887 to 1890 and Deputy City Treasurer from 1894 to 1896.

=== Death ===
Hubbell died in Nyack, New York on February 5, 1897. He is buried at Albany Rural Cemetery.

His name is sometimes spelled as "Hubbel."

U.S. House of Representatives
Preceded by John B. Steele	Member of the U.S. House of Representatives from New York's 13th congressional district 1865–1867	Succeeded by Thomas Cornell
