= William E. McCormick =

American politician and lawyer

William Edward McCormick (April 17, 1831 – March 12, 1900) was an American lawyer, businessman, and politician from New York.

== Life ==
McCormick was born on April 17, 1831, in Ithaca, New York. He was the son of Jacob Miller McCormick, a veteran of the War of 1812 and prominent Ithaca resident, and Catherine Conrad. His maternal side was of Dutch ancestry. His paternal great-grandfather was Joseph McCormick, a Scotch-Irish immigrant who lived near the Giants' Causeway in County Antrim and came to America in 1760.

McCormick attended Union College in Schenectady, graduating in 1850 at the age of 19. He then studied law in the law office of prominent Ithaca attorneys Ferris and Cushing, and was admitted to the bar in 1852. He initially practiced law in Ithaca, but later switched to railroad work. As he already took a course on civil engineering at Union College, he moved to Indiana and joined a classmate also working with railroads.

McCormick later moved to New York City, where he intended to practice law, but Augustus Whiton, the superintendent of the Eastern Division of the Erie Railroad, convinced him to accept a position with the Erie Railroad. He would come to work for them for fifteen years. In 1856, he moved to Port Jervis, initially as a fuel agent for the Delaware Division and later as resident engineer and paymaster. He later worked with the freight department in New York City and Chicago.

In 1870, McCormick permanently moved to Port Jervis, where he worked in the real estate and insurance business and dealt in musical instruments. He served a number of local offices, including village president, a member of the board of trustees, justice of the peace, sewer commissioner, village treasurer, a member of the board of education, chief engineer of the fire department, and police justice.

In 1891, McCormick was elected to the New York State Assembly as a Democrat, representing the Orange County 2nd District. He served in the Assembly in 1892.

In 1873, McCormick married Mary Gertrude Broadhead of Port Jervis. Their son Frank died young. McCormick was a member of the Presbyterian church and led the singing for more than 30 years.

McCormick died at home on March 12, 1900. He was buried in Laurel Grove Cemetery.

New York State Assembly
Preceded by Michael N. Kane	New York State Assembly; Orange County, 2nd District; 1892	Succeeded by John Kinsila
