= Pine View Farm =

Historic house in New York, United States

- U.S. National Register of Historic Places
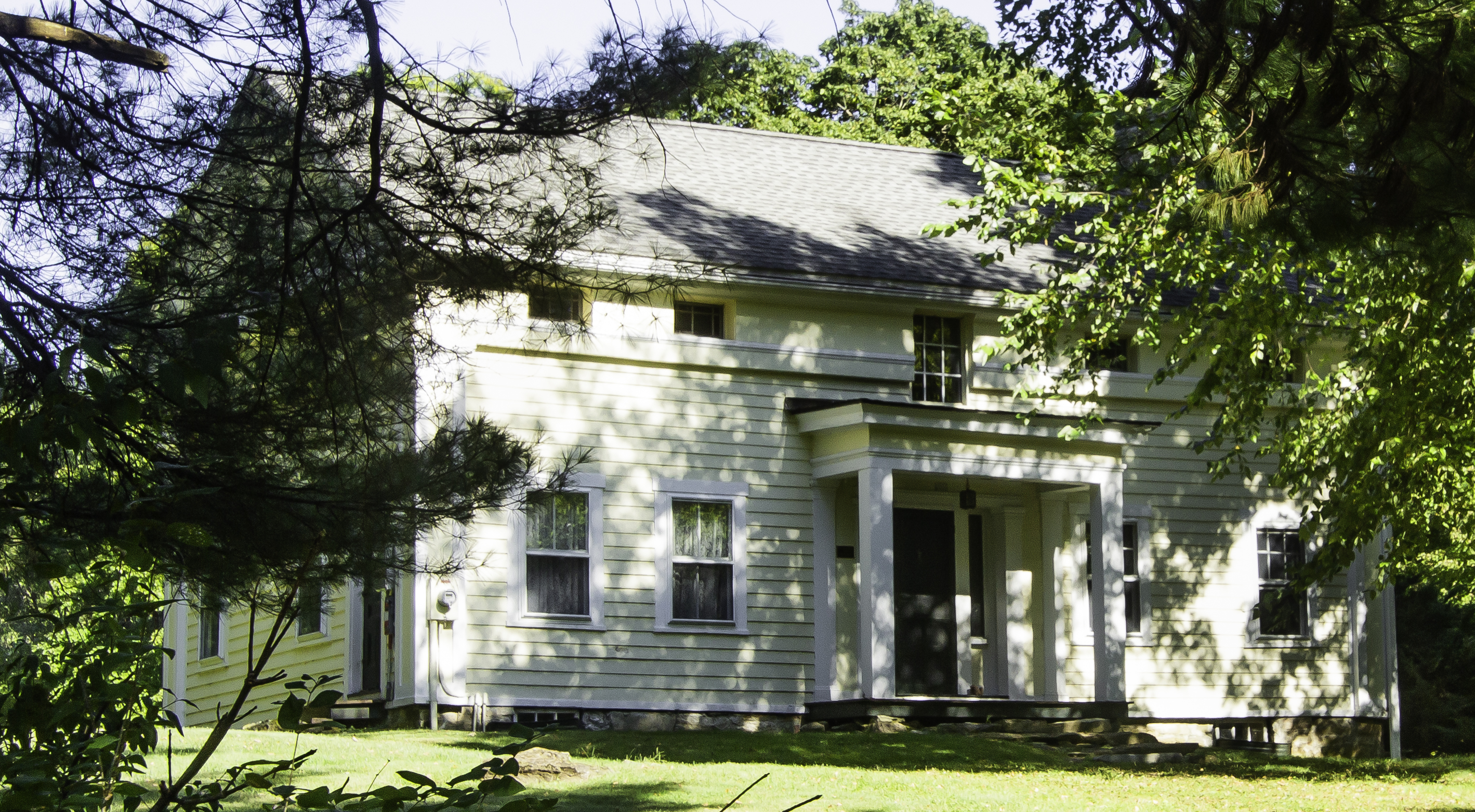

- Location within New York Location within the United States
- Location: 567 Collins St., Hillsdale, New York
- Coordinates: 42°12′59″N 73°30′16″W
- Area: 5.6 acres (2.3 ha)
- Built: 1845
- Architectural style: Greek Revival
- NRHP reference No.: 02000614
- Added to NRHP: June 6, 2002

Pine View Farm is a historic home located at Hillsdale in Columbia County, New York. It was built in 1845 and is a 1 1/2-story rectangular frame dwelling with a moderately pitched gable roof. The interior features elements of Greek Revival–style details. Also on the property is a former carriage house.

It was added to the National Register of Historic Places in 2002.
