= Jacob S. Freer =

American politician

Jacob S. Freer (January 22, 1824 in Marbletown, Ulster County, New York – January 27, 1892) was an American physician and politician from New York.

== Life ==
He graduated from Geneva Medical College in 1846, and commenced the practice of medicine in Bloomingburg. Two years later he removed to Ellenville. He married Sarah J. Jackson (1828–1912), and they had several children.

He was a member of the New York State Assembly (Ulster Co., 1st D.) in 1852; and of the New York State Senate (10th D.) in 1862 and 1863.

He was buried at the Fantinekill Cemetery in Ellenville.

== Sources ==
- The New York Civil List compiled by Franklin Benjamin Hough, Stephen C. Hutchins and Edgar Albert Werner (1870; pg. 443 and 474)
- Biographical Sketches of the State Officers and the Members of the Legislature of the State of New York in 1862 and '63 by William D. Murphy (1863; pg. 70ff)
- Freer genealogy at RootsWeb

New York State Assembly
Preceded by William Fiero Russell	New York State Assembly; Ulster County, 1st District; 1852	Succeeded by John Lounsbury
New York State Senate
Preceded by Joshua Fiero Jr.	New York State Senate; 10th District; 1862–1863	Succeeded by George Beach
