= Josiah Sutherland =

American judge

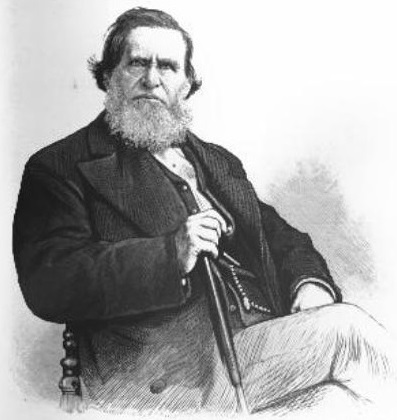

32nd United States Congress
- In office March 4, 1851 – March 3, 1853

Personal details
- Born: June 12, 1804 Stissing, New York, US
- Died: May 25, 1887 (aged 82) New York City, US
- Resting place: Woodlawn Cemetery, Bronx
- Party: Democratic
- Education: Union College; Litchfield Law School

Josiah Sutherland (June 12, 1804 – May 25, 1887) was an American lawyer, jurist, and politician from New York. From 1851 to 1853, he served one term in the U.S. House of Representatives.

== Life ==
He graduated from Union College in 1824. Then he studied law in Waterford, New York, and Hudson, New York, and the Litchfield Law School. He was admitted to the bar in 1828, and commenced practice in Livingston, New York. He was District Attorney of Columbia County from 1832 to 1843. In 1838, he moved to Hudson, New York, the county seat.

=== Congress ===
Sutherland was elected as a Democrat to the 32nd United States Congress, and served from March 4, 1851, to March 3, 1853. Afterwards he resumed the practice of law in New York City.

=== Jurist ===
He was a justice of the New York Supreme Court (1st District) from 1858 to 1871, and was ex officio a judge of the New York Court of Appeals in 1862 and 1870. He was a judge of the New York City Court of General Sessions from 1872 to 1878. Afterwards he resumed the practice of law.

=== Death and burial ===
He died on May 25, 1887, and was buried at the Woodlawn Cemetery, Bronx.

== See also ==
- George G. Barnard

== Sources ==
- United States Congress. "Josiah Sutherland (id: S001084)". Biographical Directory of the United States Congress.
- The New York Civil List compiled by Franklin Benjamin Hough (pages 350 and 372; Weed, Parsons and Co., 1858)
- Court of Appeals judges

U.S. House of Representatives
Preceded by Peter H. Silvester	Member of the U.S. House of Representatives from New York's 11th congressional district 1851–1853	Succeeded by Theodoric R. Westbrook
