= Michael N. Kane =

American lawyer

Michael Nolan Kane (April 1, 1851 – June 15, 1924) was an American lawyer, judge, and politician from New York.

== Life ==
Kane was born on April 1, 1851, in McLean, New York, the son of Patrick Kane and Catherine Nolan.

Kane attended the local district school and the Cortlandville Academy. He graduated from the Cortland Normal School in 1873 and was the president of his class. He taught school for two years and worked as a principal of Monroe and Norwich High Schools. From 1875 to 1876, he took a special course at Cornell University. He studied law under Samuel D. Halliday in Ithaca. He graduated from Albany Law School in 1878, delivering the class oration. He was admitted to the bar later that year and practiced law in Warwick. He was police justice and village president, and from 1884 to 1890 he served as special surrogate of Orange County.

In 1890, Kane was elected to the New York State Assembly as a Democrat, representing the Orange County 2nd District. He served in the Assembly in 1891. He was a delegate to the 1904 Democratic National Convention. He was a presidential elector in the 1912 presidential election. In 1906, he was the Democratic and Independence League candidate for the New York Supreme Court. In 1907, he became the senior member of the firm Kane & Stage, with Lewis J. Stage as partner. Stage studied law in Kane's office as a clerk in 1890. In 1921, Stage's son Lawrence joined the law firm. He organized the Warwick, Chester and Monroe Building and Loan Association with George R. Conklin of Monroe, serving as its counsel when he died. He was also a director of one of the National Banks of Monroe, a manager of the Middletown Homeopathic State Hospital, president of the Warwick Building Association, and a director of Warwick Knife Company and the Warwick Valley Telephone Company. He had law offices in Monroe. Interested in real estate, he had large holdings in Walton Lake and developed a summer colony there that he sold the year in 1924.

Kane was president of the Orange County Bar Association, a charter member of the Fortnightly Club of Warwick, and a member of the New York State Bar Association, the American Bar Association, the Orange County Society, and the Cortland County Society. In 1878, he married Emma Boyd. They had one daughter, Mrs. Grace Kane Todd.

Kane died at his niece Mrs. D. R. Reilly's home in Cortland from a long illness on June 15, 1924. He was buried in Warwick Cemetery.

New York State Assembly
Preceded by George Woodward Greene	New York State Assembly; Orange County, 2nd District; 1891	Succeeded by William E. McCormick
