= Rufus H. King =

American politician

Member of the U.S. House of Representatives from New York's 11th district
- In office March 4, 1855 – March 3, 1857
- Preceded by: Theodoric R. Westbrook
- Succeeded by: William Fiero Russell

Personal details
- Born: January 20, 1820 Rensselaerville, New York, U.S.
- Died: September 13, 1890 (aged 70) Catskill, New York, U.S.
- Party: Republican
- Other political affiliations: Whig (1855-1857)

Rufus H. King (January 20, 1820 – September 13, 1890) was a U.S. representative from New York.

== Biography ==
Born in Rensselaerville, New York, King completed preparatory studies and was graduated from Wesleyan University. He studied law. He was admitted to the bar in 1843 and commenced practice in Catskill, New York.

King was elected as an Whig candidate to the Thirty-fourth Congress (March 4, 1855 – March 3, 1857). He was not a candidate for renomination in 1856. He resumed the practice of law.

He served as president of the Catskill National Bank from 1865 to 1867. On the consolidation of that bank with the Tanners' National Bank, King continued on the board of directors. He served as presidential elector on the Republican ticket in 1860. He served as delegate to the Republican National Convention in 1868 and 1880.

He died in Catskill, New York, September 13, 1890. He was interred in Catskill Village Cemetery.

== Sources ==
- United States Congress. "Rufus H. King (id: K000213)". Biographical Directory of the United States Congress.

U.S. House of Representatives
Preceded by Theodoric R. Westbrook	Member of the U.S. House of Representatives from New York's 11th congressional district 1855–1857	Succeeded by William F. Russell
