= Emmanuel Lutheran Church of Harlemville and Cemetery =

Historic church in New York, United States

- U.S. National Register of Historic Places
- Location within New York Location within the United States
- Location: Cty. 21 and Pheasant Ln., Harlemville Rd. at Ten Broeck Rd., Harlemville, New York
- Coordinates: 42°15′54″N 73°35′3″W
- Area: less than one acre
- Built: 1871
- Architect: Ed Coon
- Architectural style: Greek Revival
- NRHP reference No.: 01001505
- Added to NRHP: January 24, 2002

Emmanuel Lutheran Church of Harlemville and Cemetery is a historic Lutheran church and cemetery at County 21 and Pheasant Lane, Harlemville Road at Ten Broeck Road in Harlemville, Columbia County, New York. The church was built 1871–1873 and is a one-story, rectangular wood-frame building with clapboard siding and a gable roof. It features a square bell tower and is set on a fieldstone foundation. The cemetery holds about 200 burials and is still in use.

It was listed on the National Register of Historic Places in 2002.
