= William Fiero Russell =

American politician

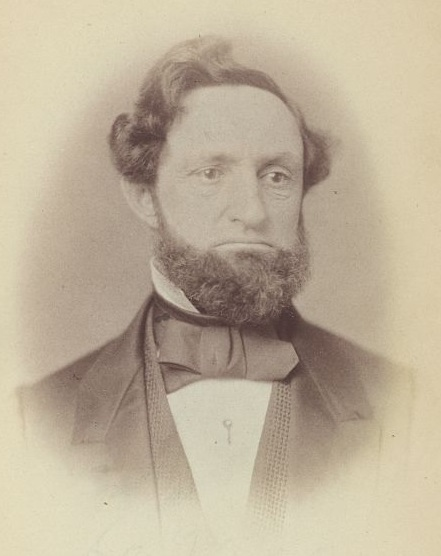

Member of the U.S. House of Representatives from New York's 11th district
- In office March 4, 1857 – March 3, 1859
- Preceded by: Rufus H. King
- Succeeded by: William S. Kenyon

Member of the New York State Assembly from the Ulster district
- In office 1851–1851
- Preceded by: Milton Sheldon
- Succeeded by: Jacob S. Freer

Personal details
- Born: January 14, 1812 Saugerties, New York, U.S.
- Died: April 26, 1896 (aged 84) Saugerties, New York, U.S.
- Party: Democratic
- Profession: Businessman, banker

William Fiero Russell (January 14, 1812 – April 29, 1896) was an American banker who served one term as a U.S. representative from New York from 1857 to 1859.

== Biography ==
He was born in Saugerties, New York on January 14, 1812, to Jeremiah Russell. He completed preparatory studies, and then became active in several businesses, often ventures in which his father also had an interest.

He was the founder and president of the Saugerties Bank. He served as postmaster of Saugerties from October 19, 1836, to January 25, 1841. Russell was a member of the New York State Assembly (Ulster Co., 1st D.) in 1851.

=== Congress ===
Russell was elected as a Democrat to the 35th United States Congress, holding office from March 4, 1857, to March 3, 1859.

=== Later career ===
He was appointed as Naval Officer of the Port of New York City in 1859, and he served until 1861. (U.S. ports were run by three political appointees—the collector, naval officer (or navy agent) and surveyor. These individuals were responsible for assessing customs duties on incoming cargo and ensuring payment to the Department of the Treasury. Because they were paid a percentage of duties collected as well as a portion of the fines levied for attempting to evade customs, and because employees of the customs houses were political party loyalists who were expected to contribute to their party, the collector, naval officer and surveyor positions were sought after political plums.)

After leaving the Naval Officer's post Russell returned to his banking business.

=== Death and burial ===
He died in Saugerties, New York on April 29, 1896. He was interred in Mountain View Cemetery.

== Sources ==
- United States Congress. "William Fiero Russell (id: R000542)". Biographical Directory of the United States Congress.

New York State Assembly
| Preceded by Milton Sheldon | New York State Assembly; Ulster County, 1st District; 1851 | Succeeded by Jacob S. Freer |
U.S. House of Representatives
| Preceded by Rufus H. King | Member of the U.S. House of Representatives from New York's 11th congressional district 1857–1859 | Succeeded by William S. Kenyon |
