= Boice House =

Historic house in New York, United States

- U.S. National Register of Historic Places
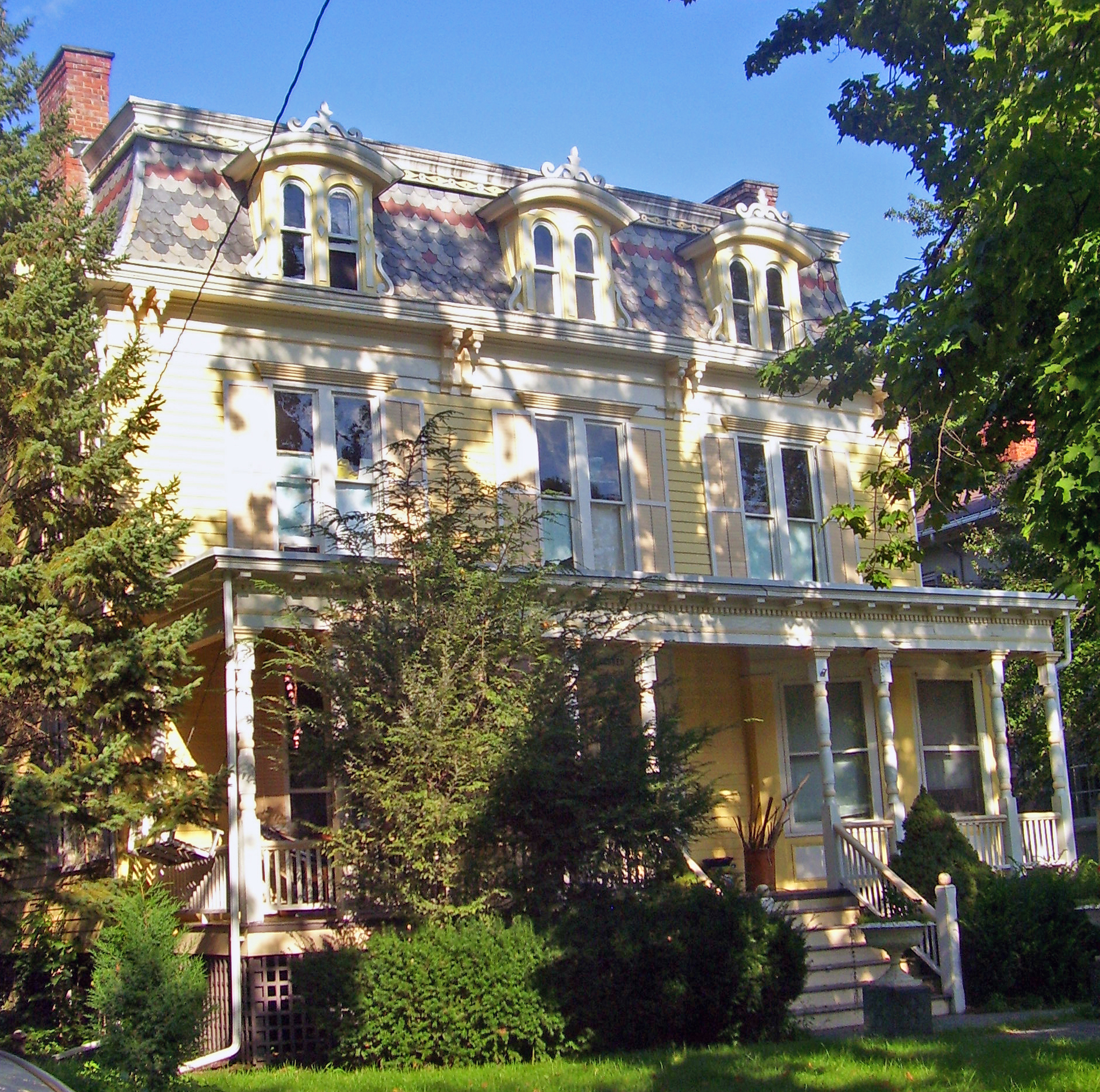
- West (front) elevation, 2008

- Location within New York Location within the United States
- Location: 110 Fair St., Kingston, New York
- Coordinates: 41°55′40″N 74°0′58″W
- Area: less than one acre
- Built: 1850
- Architectural style: Greek Revival, Second Empire
- NRHP reference No.: 01001388
- Added to NRHP: December 28, 2001

The Boice House is located on Fair Street in Kingston, New York, United States. It was first built around 1850 in the Greek Revival architectural style.

Twenty years later, it was bought by Hewett Boice, a local quarry operator. He had the house refurbished in the then-popular Second Empire style. It was listed on the National Register of Historic Places in 2001.

== Property ==
It is a two-and-a-half-story frame building with a two-story rear wing on a stone and brick foundation on the east side of Fair Street. Nearby on that side of the street are the Chichester and William Kenyon houses, both also listed on the Register. It is topped with a mansard roof shingled in patterned slate with an overhanging, bracketed eave. The roof is pierced by round-arched decorated dormer windows.

The five-bay west (front) facade has an ornate Victorian porch along its entire first story. On the south elevation is a projecting bay window and the remains of a porte-cochere.

A central hall with pressed-metal ceilings, lincrusta wall coverings and flat-paneled wainscoting opens up from the entrance vestibule. A finely crafted staircase goes up from the side, its landing lit by a stained glass window. There are Greek Revival moldings in every room on the first floor, and Italianate marble fireplace surrounds in the parlors.

Outside are several contributing resources. Five are objects, all made of bluestone: a carriage mounting block with "H. BOICE" carved into it, hitching post, two plinth blocks with planters, and a walkway. The former carriage house at the rear of the property, now converted to a home studio, is also contributing.

== History ==
The minimal records available for the history of Fair Street in the late 19th century, when it was the residence of many of the city's most affluent residents, suggest that the house was built around 1850 by Erastus Cooke, a local lawyer. In 1869 he sold it to Elizabeth P. Cockburn of Hurley, NY. In 1885, she and her husband Wiliam Cockburn sold the house to Hewitt Boice, whose quarry had provided some of the stone for the Brooklyn Bridge, for $7,000 ($189,000 in contemporary dollars). He renovated its exterior in a high Second Empire style, most of which remains intact.

In 1917 Boice's daughter, Virginia Boice Seeley inherited it. She, in turn, deeded it to her stepmother, Katherine Deyo Boice, who remarried and lived there until she died in 1953. It has been through several other owners since then but remains a private residence.

== See also ==
- National Register of Historic Places listings in Ulster County, New York
