= John F. Collin =

American politician (1802-1889)

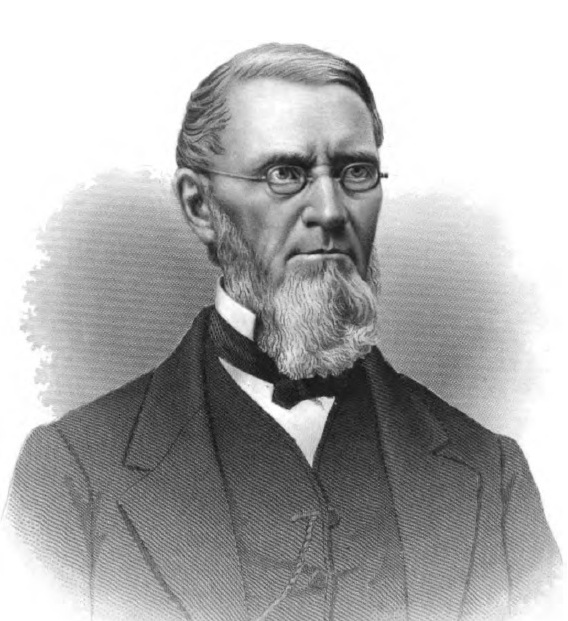

Chairman of the Committee on Expenditures in the Department of the Navy
- In office March 4, 1845 – March 3, 1847

Member of the U.S. House of Representatives from New York's 11th district
- In office March 4, 1845 – March 3, 1847
- Preceded by: Zadock Pratt
- Succeeded by: Peter H. Silvester

New York State Assembly
- In office 1834

Personal details
- Born: April 30, 1802 Hillsdale, New York
- Died: September 16, 1889 (aged 87) Hillsdale, New York
- Party: Democratic

John Francis Collin (April 30, 1802 – September 16, 1889) was an American politician who served one term as a U.S. representative from New York 1845 to 1847.

== Biography ==
Born in Hillsdale, New York, Collin attended the common schools and Lenox Academy, Massachusetts. He engaged in agricultural pursuits. He served as member of the State assembly in 1834. Supervisor of Hillsdale.

=== Congress ===
Collin was elected as a Democrat to the Twenty-ninth Congress (March 4, 1845 – March 3, 1847). He served as chairman of the Committee on Expenditures in the Department of the Navy (Twenty-ninth Congress).

=== Later career and death ===
He resumed agricultural pursuits.

He died in Hillsdale, New York, September 16, 1889. He was interred in Hillsdale Rural Cemetery.

U.S. House of Representatives
Preceded by Zadock Pratt	Member of the U.S. House of Representatives from New York's 11th congressional district March 4, 1845 – March 3, 1847	Succeeded by Peter H. Silvester
