= Theodoric R. Westbrook =

American politician

Theodoric Romeyn Westbrook
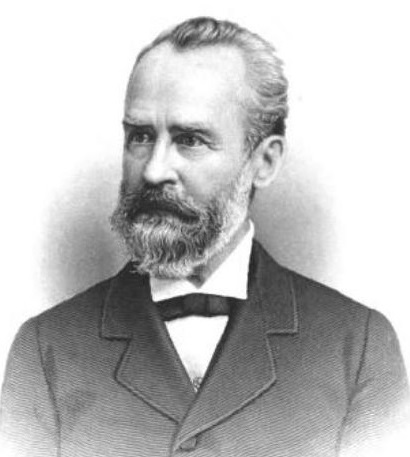
- T. R. Westbrook, New York Congressman and Judge

Member of the U.S. House of Representatives from New York's 11th district
- In office March 4, 1853 – March 3, 1855
- Preceded by: Josiah Sutherland
- Succeeded by: Rufus H. King

Justice of the New York Supreme Court
- In office 1873–1885
- Succeeded by: Alton B. Parker

Personal details
- Born: November 20, 1821 Fishkill, New York, United States
- Died: October 6, 1885 (aged 63) Troy, New York, United States
- Resting place: Wiltwyck Cemetery, Kingston, New York, United States
- Party: Democratic
- Education: Rutgers College

Theodoric Romeyn Westbrook (November 20, 1821 – October 6, 1885) was a U.S. Representative from New York.

== Biography ==
Born in Fishkill, New York on November 20, 1821 (some sources indicate 1822), Westbrook attended the local schools and graduated from Rutgers College in 1838. He studied law with Abraham B. Hasbrouck and Marius Schoonmaker, was admitted to the bar in 1843, and commenced practice in Kingston, New York. Among the students who learned the law in Westbrook's office was Stephen Gardner Champlin.

Westbrook was elected as a Democrat to the Thirty-third Congress (March 4, 1853 – March 3, 1855). He declined to be a candidate for renomination in 1854, and resumed the practice of law.

During the American Civil War Westbrook supported the Union, and organized efforts to recruit, equip and train soldiers for the Union Army.

In 1873 Westbrook was elected a Justice of the New York Supreme Court. He served as a trustee of Rutgers College, and received the honorary degree of LL.D. in 1875.

Westbrook is most notable as the center of a scandal in which he was exposed for irregularities in the carrying out of his official duties. Having told financier Jay Gould that he would go to the limits of his authority to aid Gould's attempted takeover of the Manhattan Elevated Railway Company, Westbrook went so far as to conduct judicial proceedings in Gould's office.

Gould was found to have used insider information and rulings from corrupt state officials to drive down the price of the company's stock, forcing it into bankruptcy and cheating shareholders out of their stock's value when he acquired the company in a subsequent court proceeding administered by Westbrook. At the urging of Assemblyman Theodore Roosevelt, in 1882 their relationship was investigated by a special committee of the New York State Assembly, but members of the committee quashed the results of the inquiry (accused of accepting bribes to do so), and Westbrook continued to serve on the bench.

He died in his hotel room in Troy, New York on October 6, 1885, while in Troy to conduct court proceedings. He was interred in Kingston's Wiltwyck Cemetery.

Westbrook was succeeded on the bench by Alton B. Parker.

== Sources ==
- United States Congress. "Theodoric R. Westbrook (id: W000307)". Biographical Directory of the United States Congress.

U.S. House of Representatives
Preceded by Josiah Sutherland	Member of the U.S. House of Representatives from New York's 11th congressional district March 4, 1853 – March 3, 1855	Succeeded by Rufus H. King
