= Peter Kane Dufault =

American poet

Peter Kane Dufault (April 22, 1923 – April 20, 2013) was an American poet. He was born in New Jersey.

Dufault wrote poetry for almost sixty years. Raised in New York City, he graduated from Harvard University and served as a bomber pilot during World War II. In 1968 he ran for Congress in Columbia County, New York on the Liberal Party's anti-war platform. He was variously employed as a tree-surgeon, journalist, teacher, house-painter, and pollster; he was poet-in-residence at the Cheltenham Festival on two occasions. He was well known as fiddler, banjo-player, and dance-caller. His poems have appeared in many magazines and journals including The New Yorker, London Magazine and Poetry. His poetry was also included in the Norton Anthology of Poetry in the 1996 Edition. He was raised in Mamaroneck New York, and from 1960 until his death he lived and wrote in Hillsdale, New York.

On June 4, 2010, a documentary film about Dufault, What I Meant to Tell You: An American Poet’s State of the Union, had its world premiere at the Berkshire International Film Festival in Great Barrington, Massachusetts.

He died two days short of his 90th birthday in 2013 at his home in Hillsdale, New York.

== Collected works ==
- Angel of accidence (1954)
- For some stringed instrument (1957)
- A Westchester Farewell-and Other Poems (1968)
- On Balance, Selected Poems (1978)
- Memorandum to the Age of Reason (Lindisfarne, 1988)
- New Things Come into the World (1993)
- Looking in All Directions (Nov 7, 2000)
- To Be in the Same World (Dec 31, 2007)
