= Truman A. Merriman =

American politician

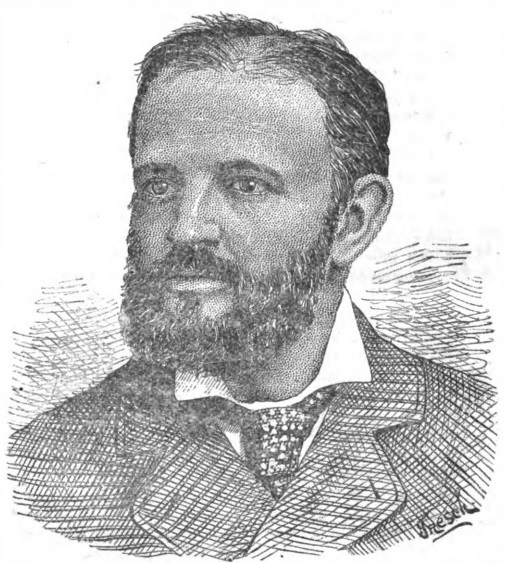

Member of the U.S. House of Representatives from New York's 11th district
- In office March 4, 1885 – March 3, 1889
- Preceded by: Orlando B. Potter
- Succeeded by: John Quinn

Personal details
- Born: Truman Adams Merrimam; September 5, 1839 Auburn, New York, U.S.
- Died: April 16, 1892 (aged 52) New York City, U.S.
- Resting place: Fort Hill Cemetery

Truman Adams Merriman (September 5, 1839 – April 16, 1892) was an American lawyer, Civil War veteran, and politician who served two terms as a U.S. representative from New York from 1885 to 1889.

== Biography ==
=== Early life and education ===
He was born on September 5, 1839, in Auburn, New York. Merriman attended Auburn Academy, and in 1861, he graduated from Hobart College in Geneva, New York.

=== Civil War ===
He entered the Union Army in September 1861 as a captain, commanding a company which he had raised as part of the 92nd New York Volunteer Infantry. He took part in several battles, including the Fair Oaks, Seven Days, and Petersburg. He was wounded at Petersburg, and was mustered out as a lieutenant colonel in December, 1864.

=== Legal career ===
He studied law with Charles J. Folger and was admitted to the bar in 1867. He moved to New York City in 1871 and worked as a journalist for The Sun. He served as president of the New York Press Club in 1882, 1883, and 1884.

=== Congress ===
Merriman was elected as an Independent (non-Tammany) Democrat to the Forty-ninth Congress and reelected as a Democrat to the Fiftieth Congress (March 4, 1885 – March 3, 1889). He was not a candidate for renomination in 1888.

=== Death and burial ===
He died in New York City April 16, 1892, and was interred at Fort Hill Cemetery in Auburn.

U.S. House of Representatives
Preceded by Orlando B. Potter	Member of the U.S. House of Representatives from New York's 11th congressional district 1885–1889	Succeeded by John Quinn
