= North Hillsdale Methodist Church =

- U.S. National Register of Historic Places
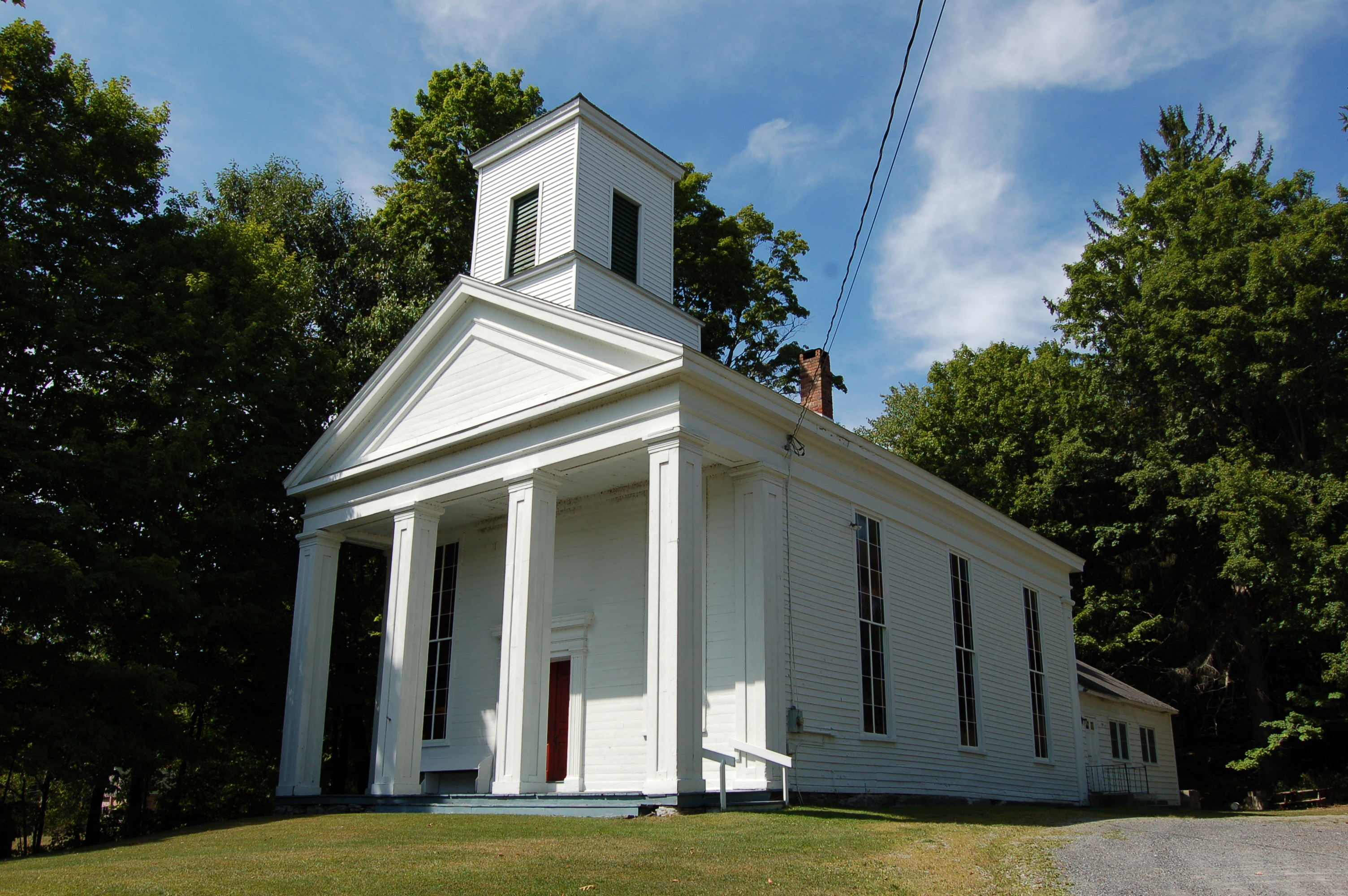

- Location within New York Location within the United States
- Nearest city: 1012 County Rte 21, North Hillsdale, New York
- Coordinates: 42°14′14.5″N 73°30′29″W
- Area: 0.42 acres (0.17 ha)
- Built: 1837-1838
- Architectural style: Greek Revival
- NRHP reference No.: 10000811
- Added to NRHP: June 11, 2010

North Hillsdale Methodist Church, also known as North Hillsdale United Methodist Church and Wesleyan Chapel of North Hillsdale, is a historic Methodist church located at North Hillsdale in Columbia County, New York. It was built between 1837 and 1838, and is a one-story, timber-frame building in the Greek Revival style. A steeple and monumental portico were added in 1859, and a mixed use addition was built on the rear in 1959. The portico features four Doric order columns.

It was listed on the National Register of Historic Places in 2010.
