= Charles H. Winfield =

American politician

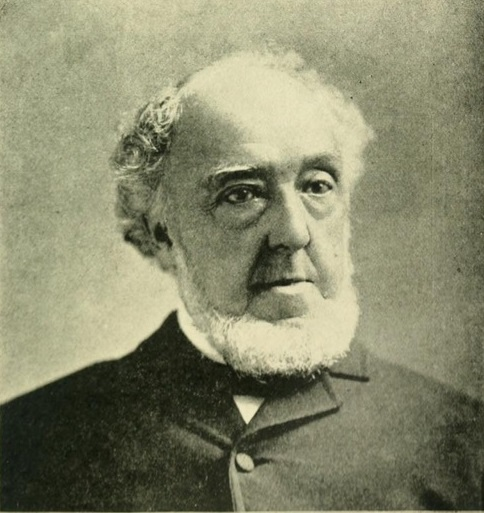
Charles H. Winfield, New York Congressman

Charles Henry Winfield (April 22, 1822 – June 10, 1888) was a U.S. representative from New York during the latter half of the American Civil War and the beginning of Reconstruction.

== Early life and education ==
Winfield was born in Crawford, New York where he completed preparatory studies before going on to study law.

== Career ==
He was admitted to the bar in 1846 and commenced practice in Goshen, New York where he eventually went on to serve as district attorney for Orange County from 1850 to 1856.

Winfield was elected as a Democrat to the Thirty-eighth and Thirty-ninth Congresses (March 4, 1863 – March 3, 1867), but he was not a candidate for renomination in 1866 and resumed his legal practice.

== Personal life and death ==
Winfield died suddenly on June 10, 1888, while addressing a group of children from the pulpit at the Reformed Church in Walden, New York. He was interred in Wallkill Valley Cemetery.

U.S. House of Representatives
Preceded by John B. Steele	Member of the U.S. House of Representatives from New York's 11th congressional district 1863–1867	Succeeded by Charles Van Wyck
