= Dr. Joseph P. Dorr House =

Historic house in New York, United States

- U.S. National Register of Historic Places
- Location within New York Location within the United States
- Location: 2745 NY 23, Hillsdale, New York
- Coordinates: 42°10′58″N 73°31′5″W
- Area: 1.5 acres (0.61 ha)
- Architectural style: Federal
- NRHP reference No.: 07001123
- Added to NRHP: October 31, 2007

Dr. Joseph P. Dorr House is a historic home located at Hillsdale in Columbia County, New York. It was built in the early 19th century and is a red brick dwelling with a 2-story main block and 1 1/2-story kitchen ell. It features a fully pedimented gable with an elliptically shaped fanlight.

It was added to the National Register of Historic Places in 2007.
