= Charles Van Wyck =

American politician

Charles Henry Van Wyck
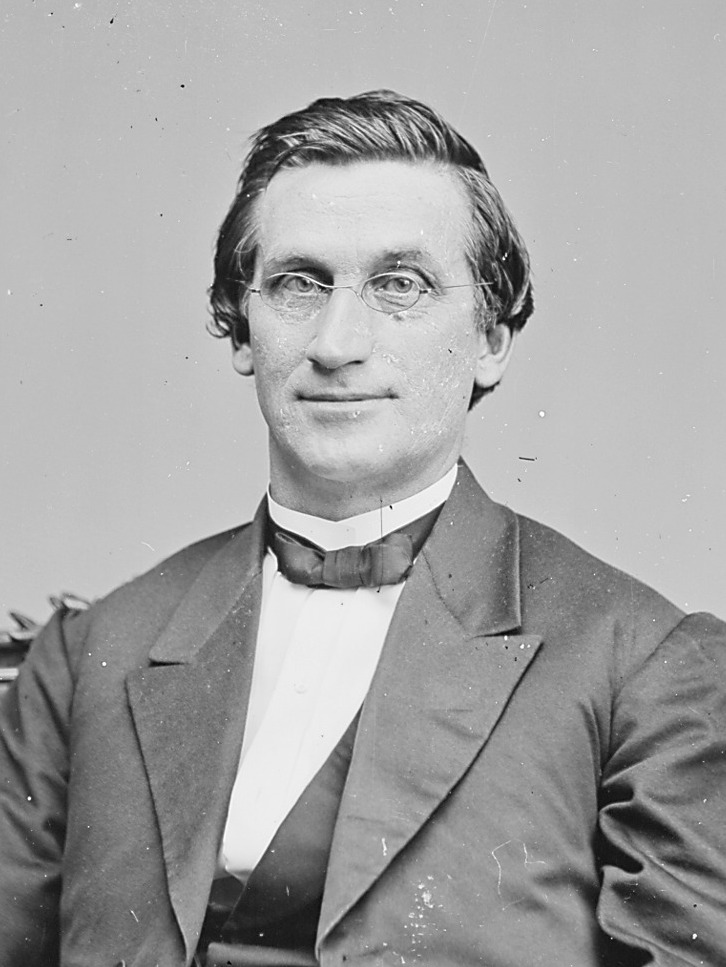
- Van Wyck c. 1860

United States Senator from Nebraska
- In office March 4, 1881 – March 3, 1887
- Preceded by: Algernon Paddock
- Succeeded by: Algernon Paddock

Member of the U.S. House of Representatives from New York
- In office February 7, 1870 – March 3, 1871
- Preceded by: George Woodward Greene
- Succeeded by: Charles St. John
- Constituency: 11th district
- In office March 4, 1867 – March 3, 1869
- Preceded by: Charles H. Winfield
- Succeeded by: George Woodward Greene
- Constituency: 11th district
- In office March 4, 1859 – March 3, 1863
- Preceded by: Ambrose S. Murray
- Succeeded by: William Radford
- Constituency: 10th district

Member of the Nebraska Senate
- In office 1877; 1879; 1881

Personal details
- Born: May 10, 1824 Poughkeepsie, New York, U.S.
- Died: October 24, 1895 (aged 71) Washington, D.C., U.S.
- Party: Republican, Populist

Charles Henry Van Wyck (May 10, 1824 – October 24, 1895) was a representative from New York, a senator from Nebraska, and a Union Army brigadier general in the American Civil War.

== Early life and political career ==
Van Wyck was born in Poughkeepsie, New York. He was a distant cousin of Robert Anderson Van Wyck and Augustus Van Wyck; their common ancestors were Theodorus Van Wyck (1668-1753) and his wife Margretia Brinckerhoff Van Wyck. He completed preparatory studies and graduated from Rutgers College, New Brunswick, New Jersey, in 1843. Van Wyck studied law, and was admitted to the bar in 1847 and commenced the practice of law. He then moved to Bloomingburg, New York, where he became the district attorney of Sullivan County, New York (1850-1856).

Van Wyck was elected to the U.S. House of Representatives as a Republican from New York to the Thirty-sixth and Thirty-seventh Congresses (March 4, 1859 – March 3, 1863). He served as chairman, Committee on Mileage (Thirty-sixth Congress) and on the Committee on Revolutionary Pensions (Thirty-seventh Congress). While in Congress, Van Wyck was a prominent member of an investigation into fraud at the New York Custom House and played a crucial role in the passage of the Fraud Claims Act. In his minority report to the investigation committee he famously wrote: “Worse than traitors in arms are the men, pretending loyalty to the flag, who feast and fatten on the misfortunes of the nation, while patriot blood is crimsoning the plains of the south, and the bodies of their countrymen are mouldering in dust.”

=== Assassination attempt ===
Van Wyck delivered a harsh anti-slavery speech on the House floor on March 7, 1860, which denounced the Southern states for the "crime against the laws of God and nature." The speech was widely reported. On February 22, 1861, Van Wyck was assaulted near the United States Capitol by three men in an assassination attempt, an attack which was reported as related to the prior year's speech. Van Wyck fought off the attack, surviving only because a notebook and copy of the Congressional Globe which he had kept in the breast pocket of his coat had blocked the blade of a Bowie knife. The three men fled and were never identified. This was also the same night as an alleged attempt was made to assassinate president-elect Abraham Lincoln in Baltimore, Maryland.

== Civil War ==
During the American Civil War Van Wyck entered the Union Army as colonel and commanding officer of the 56th New York Infantry Regiment. Part of the Army of the Potomac during the Peninsula Campaign; Van Wyck was wounded in the knee at the Battle of Fair Oaks. Much of the war was then spent as brigade and district commander in South Carolina; taking part in the Siege of Charleston Harbor and the Battle of Honey Hill. In 1865 he was brevetted brigadier general for his services during the war. He eventually received the substantial promotion to brigadier general before he was mustered out in 1866.

== Postbellum career ==
Van Wyck was elected to the Fortieth Congress (March 4, 1867 – March 3, 1869); successfully contested the election of George Woodward Greene to the Forty-first Congress and served from February 17, 1870 to March 3, 1871.

He moved to Nebraska in 1874, where he settled on a farm in Otoe County, and engaged in agricultural pursuits. Van Wyck was a delegate to the State constitutional convention in 1875. He was elected to the State senate 1877, 1879, 1881. That year, he was elected as a Republican to the United States Senate from Nebraska and served from March 4, 1881 to March 3, 1887. He served as chairman, Committee on the Mississippi River and Its Tributaries (Forty-seventh Congress) and on the Committee on the Improvement of the Mississippi River and Tributaries (Forty-eighth and Forty-ninth Congresses). Van Wyck was an unsuccessful candidate for reelection. In 1892, he was an unsuccessful Populist candidate for Governor of Nebraska. Van Wyck then retired from political life and active business pursuits. He died in Washington, D.C., and was interred beside his wife, Kate Brodhead, in Milford Cemetery, Milford, Pennsylvania.

== Personal life ==
On September 21, 1869, he married Kate Ross Brodhead (1842-1901), descendant of an early New York family. Her sister, Marcia Ross Brodhead, was married to Congressman Daniel Van Auken of New Jersey. Her first cousin, Henrietta Laura Brodhead, married Civil War US Army Colonel Samuel Fowler, son of Congressman Samuel Fowler. They became the parents of Congressman Samuel Fowler (III). Additionally, she was a cousin of Congressmen John Curtis Brodhead of New York and John Brodhead of New Hampshire.

They had four daughters:

1. Lillie Van Wyck (1870-1875)
2. Marie Louise Van Wyck (1873-1881)
3. Meta Van Wyck (1880-1881)
4. Happy Theodora Van Wyck (1883-1919)

== Gallery ==
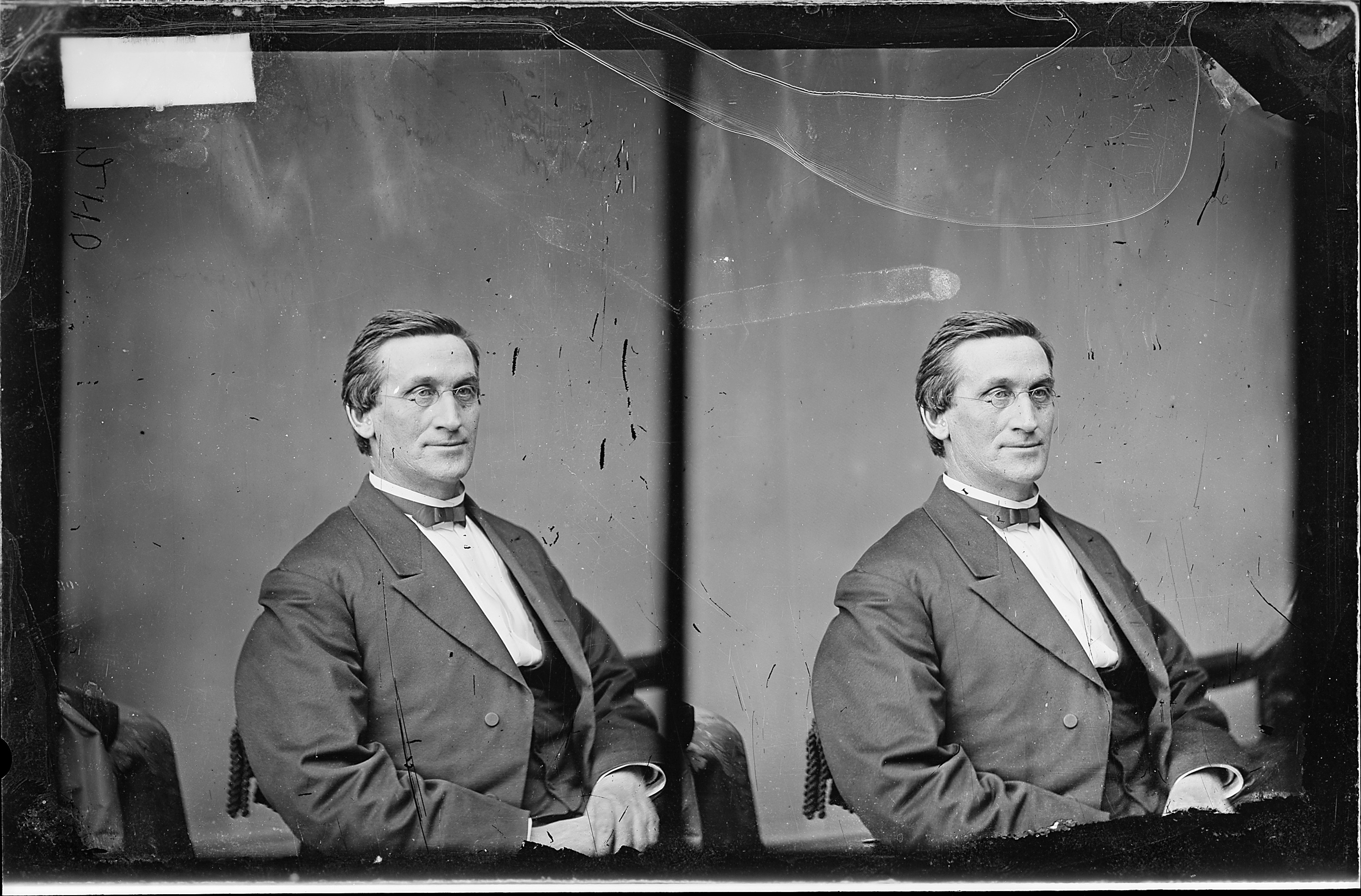

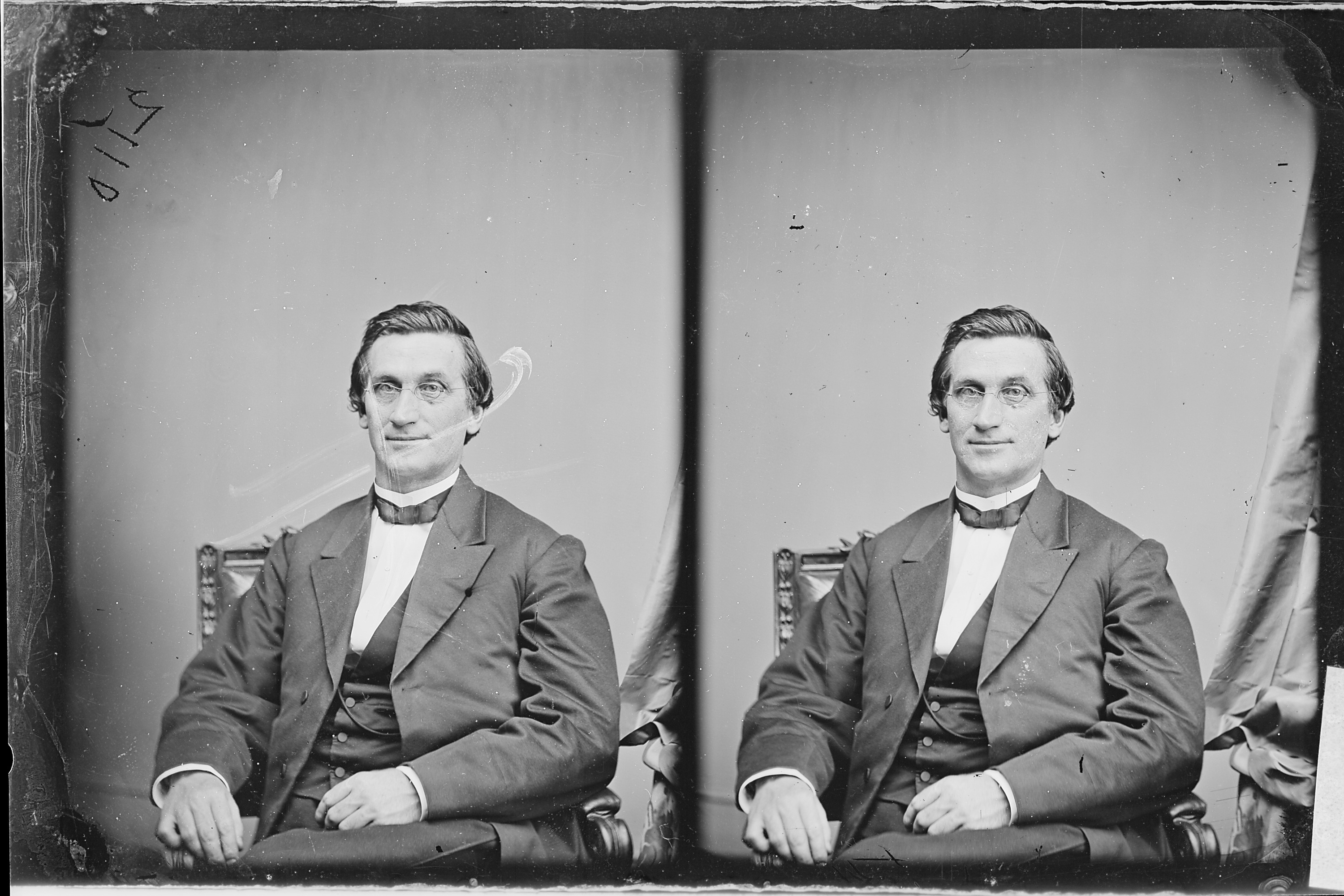

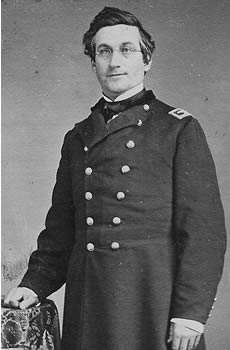

== See also ==
- Baltimore Plot
- List of American Civil War generals (Union)

== Other sources ==
- Dictionary of American Biography; Harmar, Marie V. and James L. Sellers. "Charles Henry Van Wyck: Soldier-Statesman of New York and Nebraska."
- Nebraska Historical Magazine 12 (April–June 1929): 80-129, 12 (July–September 1929): 190-246, 12 (October–December 1929): 322-73.

Party political offices
Preceded by John Holbrook Powers	Populist nominee for Governor of Nebraska; 1892	Succeeded by Silas A. Holcomb
U.S. House of Representatives
Preceded by Ambrose S. Murray	Member of the U.S. House of Representatives from New York's 10th congressional district 1859–1863	Succeeded by William Radford
Preceded by Charles H. Winfield	Member of the U.S. House of Representatives from New York's 11th congressional district 1867–1869	Succeeded by George Greene
Preceded by George Greene	Member of the U.S. House of Representatives from New York's 11th congressional district (challenge) February 7, 1870 – 1871	Succeeded by Charles St. John
U.S. Senate
Preceded by Algernon S. Paddock	U.S. senator (Class 1) from Nebraska; 1881–1887; Served alongside: Alvin Saunders, Charles F. Manderson	Succeeded by Algernon S. Paddock
