= Squire S. Case =

American businessman and politician (1801–1878)

Personal details
- Born: September 27, 1801 Hillsdale, New York, U.S.
- Died: March 30, 1878 (aged 76) Mauston, Wisconsin, U.S.
- Occupation: Hotelier

Squire S. Case (September 27, 1801 – March 30, 1878) was an American businessman and politician.

Born in Hillsdale, New York, he moved to Buffalo, New York in 1822 where he operated a hotel. He served on the Buffalo City Council. Case then served in the New York State Assembly in 1837 and 1842. He also served in the New York Militia. Case then moved to Waukesha, Wisconsin Territory as a result of losing most of his property when work on the Erie Canal was suspended. He settled on a farm in the town of Merton. He was involved in the construction of railroad cars. During that time, he served in the second Wisconsin Constitutional Convention of 1847–1848. He moved to Portage, Wisconsin, in 1857, where he worked as a railroad ticket agent. Finally he moved to Mauston, Wisconsin, where he died in 1878.
