= John B. Steele =

American politician

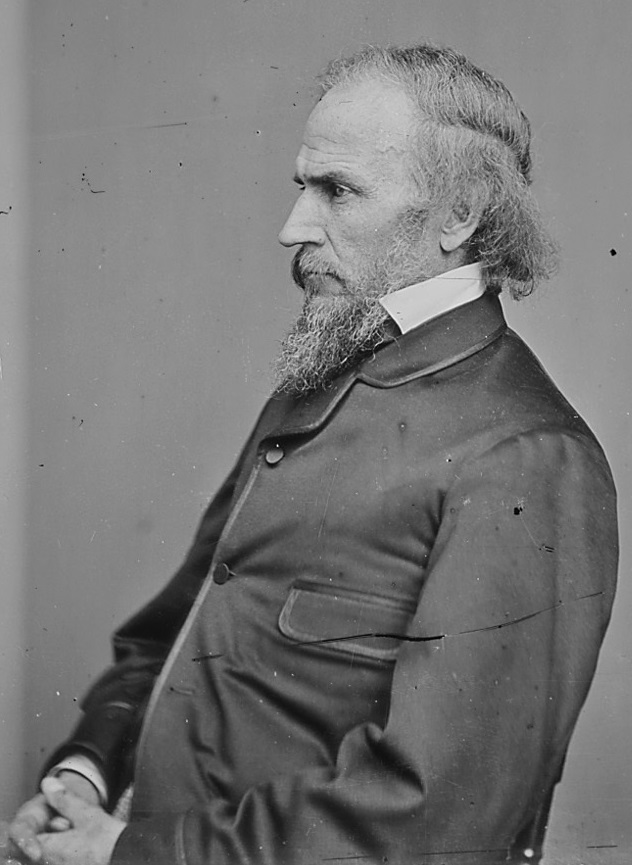

Member of the U.S. House of Representatives from New York
- In office March 4, 1861 – March 3, 1865
- Preceded by: William S. Kenyon
- Succeeded by: Edwin N. Hubbell
- Constituency: 11th district (1861–1863); 13th district (1863–1865)

Personal details
- Born: John Benedict Steele; March 28, 1814 Delhi New York, U.S.
- Died: September 24, 1866 (aged 52) Rondout, New York, U.S.
- Resting place: Wiltwyck Cemetery
- Party: Democratic
- Education: Williams College

John Benedict Steele (March 28, 1814 – September 24, 1866) was an American lawyer and politician who served two terms as a U.S. representative from New York during the American Civil War.

== Biography ==
Born in Delhi, New York, Steele attended Delaware Academy at Delhi and attended Williams College, Williamstown, Massachusetts, but left before graduating to study law in Delhi with Amasa Parker and Amasa J. Parker.

He completed his studied with Abraham Becker of Worcester, New York, was admitted to the bar of Otsego County in 1839 and commenced practice in Oneonta, New York.

He served as district attorney of Otsego County from 1841 until he moved to Kingston in 1847. In Kingston, he formed a partnership with General George H. Sharpe.

=== Political career ===
Steele was elected Special Judge of Ulster County in 1850.

Steele was then elected to the Thirty-seventh and Thirty-eighth Congresses serving from March 4, 1861 to March 3, 1865 as a Democrat, serving on committees on the District of Columbia, Revolutionary Pensions and the Pacific Railroad. He was one of 14 House Democrats to vote in favor of the Thirteenth Amendment to the United States Constitution. He was an unsuccessful candidate for renomination in 1864 to the Thirty-ninth Congress.

=== Death ===
He was again a candidate for the nomination in 1866, but died on the eve of the primary, when he died in an accident in Rondout, near Kingston, New York, on September 24, 1866. While descending Hone Street, his horse was startled, crashing his carriage against an awning post, against which Steele was thrown before falling to the ground. He suffered a cracked skull, broken ribs and other internal injuries and died later that day. He was interred in Wiltwyck Cemetery, Kingston, New York.

U.S. House of Representatives
Preceded by William S. Kenyon	Member of the U.S. House of Representatives from New York's 11th congressional district 1861–1863	Succeeded by Charles H. Winfield
Preceded by Abram B. Olin	Member of the U.S. House of Representatives from New York's 13th congressional district 1863–1865	Succeeded by Edwin N. Hubbell
