= Hillsdale, New York =

- Town
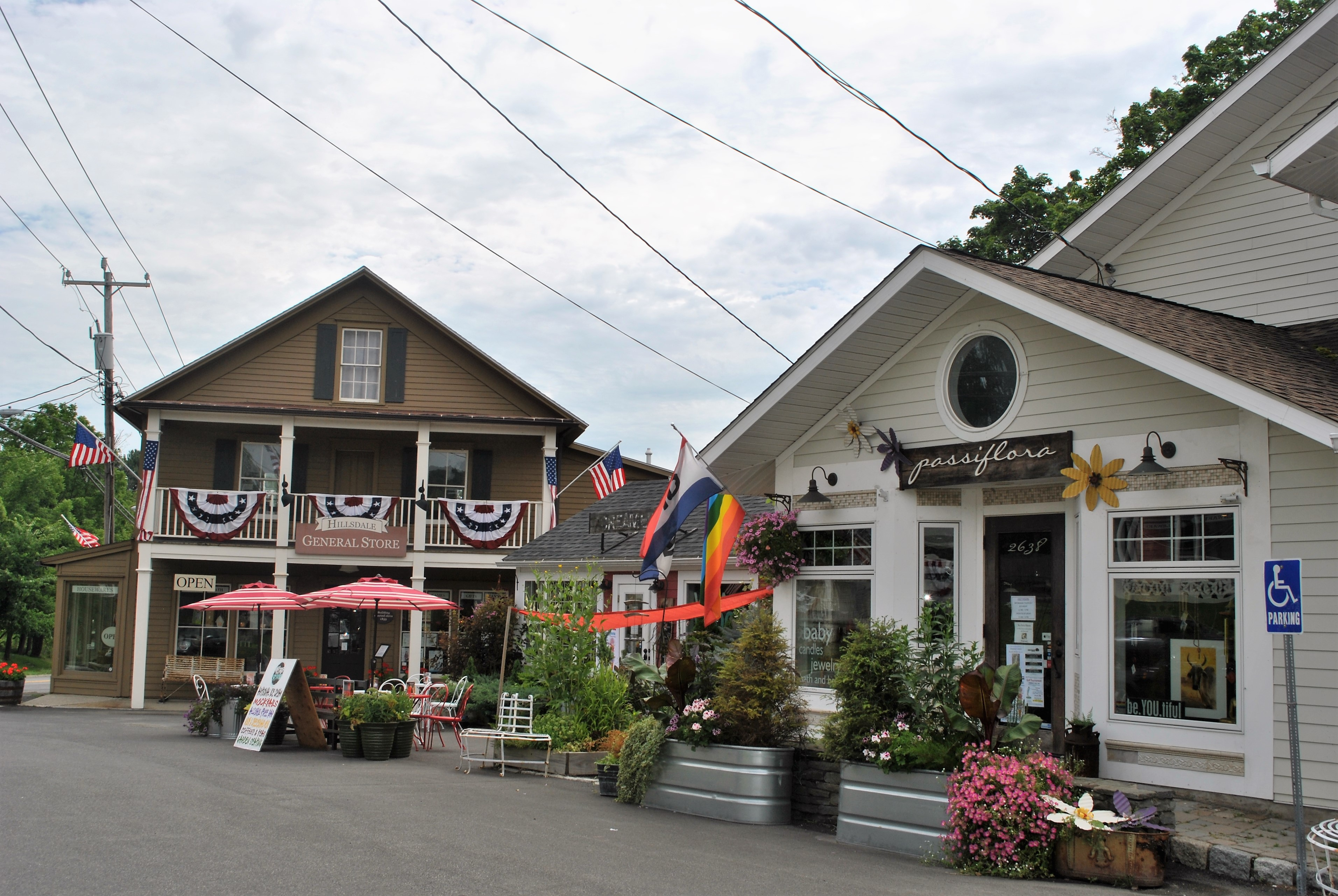
- Hillsdale hamlet

- Location of Hillsdale, New York
- Coordinates: 42.179°N 73.523°W
- Country: United States
- State: New York
- County: Columbia

Government
  - Type: Town Council
  - Town Supervisor: D. Michael Dvorchak (D)
  - Town Council: Members' List: • Tom Carty (D); • Joanna Virello (D); • Jamie Carano Nordenstrom (D); • Irwin Feld (D)

Area
  - Total: 47.89 sq mi (124.03 km^{2})
  - Land: 47.73 sq mi (123.61 km^{2})
  - Water: 0.16 sq mi (0.42 km^{2})
- Elevation: 961 ft (293 m)

Population (2020)
  - Total: 1,831
  - Density: 38.64/sq mi (14.92/km^{2})
- Time zone: UTC-5 (Eastern (EST))
  - Summer (DST): UTC-4 (EDT)
- ZIP Codes: 12529 (Hillsdale); 12521 (Craryville); 12075 (Ghent)
- Area code: 518
- FIPS code: 36-021-34748
- GNIS feature ID: 0979068
- Website: www.hillsdaleny.com

Hillsdale is a town in eastern Columbia County, New York, near the New York - Massachusetts border and Great Barrington, Massachusetts. New York state routes 22 and 23 intersect near the town center, which is listed on the National Register of Historic Places. The town has several restaurants and a general store, among other businesses. Hillsdale is known for its hilly landscape and is near Bash Bish Falls, Taconic State Park, and the Catamount Ski Area. The Harlem Valley Rail Trail, a 26-mile bike path in two sections, is located not far from the intersection of routes 22 and 23.

== History ==
Much of what would become the town of Hillsdale was part of the Manor of Rensselaerswyck. Due to overlapping boundary lines, portions of the eastern part were claimed by the Province of Massachusetts. Kakeout was established by settlers from New England who raised sheep. Around 1745, Martin Krum is reported to have purchased 800 acres in the western portion of the town from the Van Rensselaer family. Robert Noble and his associates procured the Indian title to land about five miles square in the eastern part and called it Nobletown. The Van Resselaers and the Livingstons leased land on their vast estates to tenant farmers, but those who had emigrated from Massachusetts did not recognized the landlords' titles. The dispute was not settled until 1773.

In 1776 Henry Knox passed through part of what is now North Hillsdale (formerly Nobletown) while transporting cannons from Albany, New York, to aid the Continentals in the siege of Boston. Markers erected in Hillsdale along the Henry Knox Trail in the 1920s were moved in 1975 based on new research that determined Knox entered through a different route from that marked. There is now a marker in "Old Nobletown."

This territory was taken from the town of Claverack in 1782. The Columbia Turnpike was chartered by the state legislature in 1799. The road ran from the Massachusetts state line to the Hudson River port of Hudson as a way to bring farm produce, especially wool, rye, and wheat from the farm communities downriver to New York City. Revenues from tolls covered construction and maintenance. The East Gate tollhouse was located in Hillsdale. In 2016, it was listed in the National Register of Historic Places.

The Dr. Joseph P. Dorr House and Pine View Farm are listed on the National Register of Historic Places.

== Geography ==
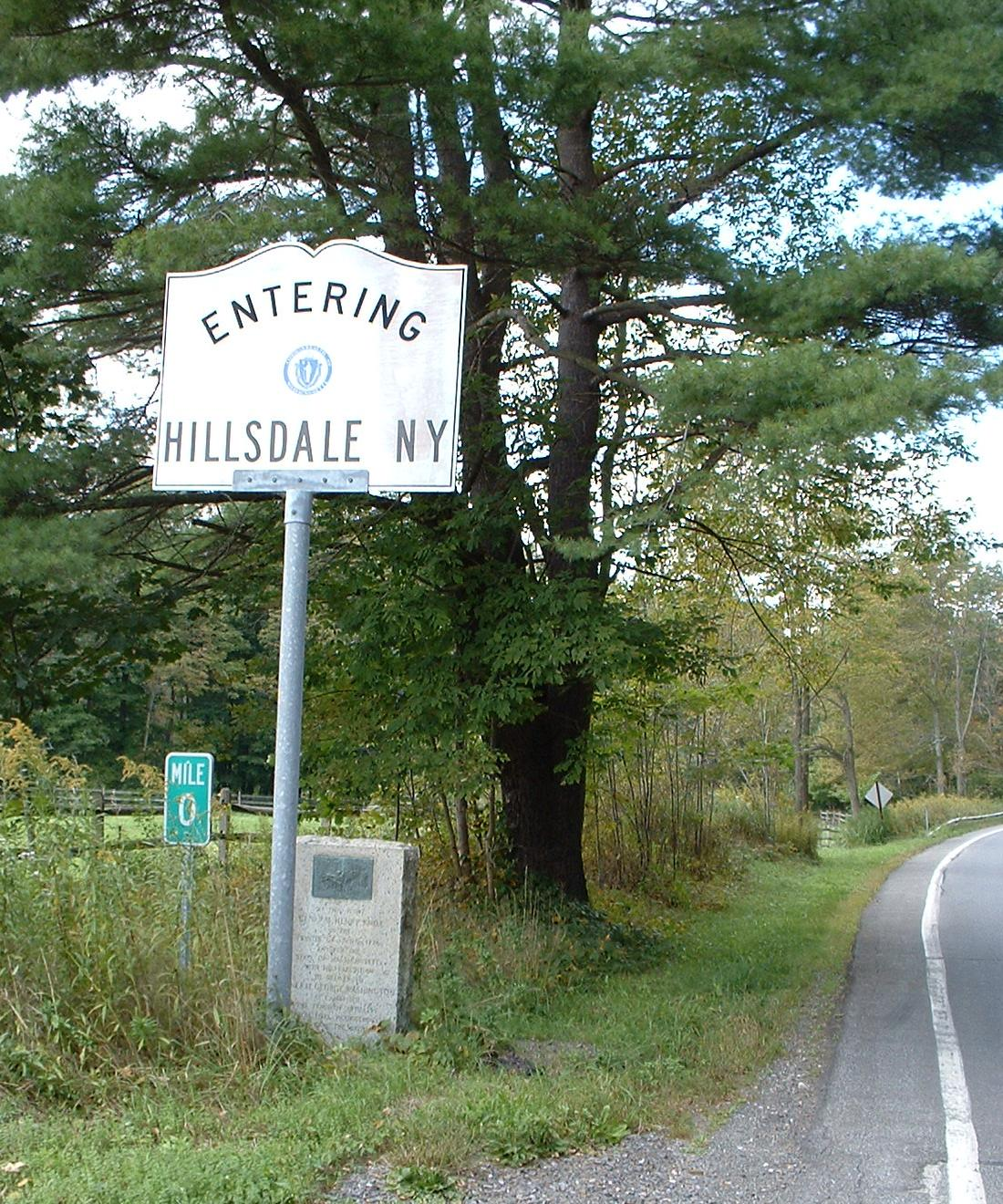
Route 71 enters Hillsdale from Alford, Massachusetts. Note the Knox Trail marker at the foot of the town line sign.

According to the United States Census Bureau, the town has a total area of 47.9 square miles (124.0 km^{2}), of which 47.7 square miles (123.6 km^{2}) is land and 0.15 square miles (0.4 km^{2}), or 0.34%, is water.

The eastern town line is the New York–Massachusetts border, along the Taghkanic Mountain range.

== Demographics ==
Historical population
Census	Pop.	Note	%±
1820	2,511		—
1830	2,446		−2.6%
1840	2,470		1.0%
1850	2,123		−14.0%
1860	2,552		20.2%
1870	2,083		−18.4%
1880	1,939		−6.9%
1890	1,554		−19.9%
1900	1,390		−10.6%
1910	1,504		8.2%
1920	1,052		−30.1%
1930	968		−8.0%
1940	1,050		8.5%
1950	1,183		12.7%
1960	1,299		9.8%
1970	1,447		11.4%
1980	1,648		13.9%
1990	1,793		8.8%
2000	1,744		−2.7%
2010	1,927		10.5%
2020	1,831		−5.0%
U.S. Decennial Census 2020

As of the census of 2000, there were 1,744 people, 721 households, and 485 families residing in the town. The population density was 36.6 inhabitants per square mile (14.1/km^{2}). There were 1,133 housing units at an average density of 23.8 per square mile (9.2/km^{2}). The racial makeup of the town was 97.88% White, 0.63% African American, 0.46% Asian, 0.52% from other races, and 0.52% from two or more races. Hispanic or Latino of any race were 1.61% of the population.

There were 721 households, out of which 28.4% had children under the age of 18 living with them, 54.0% were married couples living together, 7.6% had a female householder with no husband present, and 32.6% were non-families. 25.7% of all households were made up of individuals, and 10.7% had someone living alone who was 65 years of age or older. The average household size was 2.42 and the average family size was 2.90.

Age groups in the town were spread out, with 23.9% under the age of 18, 5.9% from 18 to 24, 23.1% from 25 to 44, 30.2% from 45 to 64, and 17.0% who were 65 years of age or older. The median age was 43 years. For every 100 females, there were 98.9 males. For every 100 females age 18 and over, there were 97.5 males.

The median income for a household in the town was $40,156, and the median income for a family was $46,250. Males had a median income of $30,893 versus $25,694 for females. The per capita income for the town was $27,186. About 4.7% of families and 8.3% of the population were below the poverty line, including 8.5% of those under age 18 and 5.1% of those age 65 or over.

== Communities and locations ==
- Harlemville – The hamlet of Harlemville is located in the northwestern corner of the town on County Route 21. It is the home of Hawthorne Valley Farm Store and its Waldorf school. The Emmanuel Lutheran Church of Harlemville and Cemetery were listed on the National Register of Historic Places in 2002.
- Hillsdale Hamlet – The hamlet of Hillsdale is located on the southern border of the town, next to the Copake town line. It is at the junction of state routes 22 and 23. The Hillsdale Hamlet Historic District was added to the National Register of Historic Places in 2010 due to its abundance of pre-1900 buildings, including the recently restored Hillsdale General Store and three historic inns: Hillsdale House, Mount Washington House, and a 1790 brick structure that formerly housed the Aubergine restaurant. The Hillsdale Hamlet Park offers playground equipment for children and a basketball court. A town flea market is held in the park over Memorial Day weekend. An extension of the Harlem Valley Rail Trail terminates in the hamlet. The 1.5-mile extension was paved in spring 2017.
- North Hillsdale – A hamlet near the center of Hillsdale on Route 22, originally the location of Nobletown. The North Hillsdale Methodist Church was listed on the National Register of Historic Places in 2010.
- Roeliff Jansen Park, a state park run by the town of Hillsdale, has miles of hiking and snowshoeing trails, a year-round dog run, many family events, and a summer program for children, as well as a weekly Copake Hillsdale Farmers Market in the summer and fall. The park is located on Route 22 in the town of Copake, approximately one mile south of the intersection of Routes 22 and 23.
- Across from the park is the Roeliff Jansen Community Library, which also serves the towns of Copake and Ancram.

== Festivals and celebrations ==
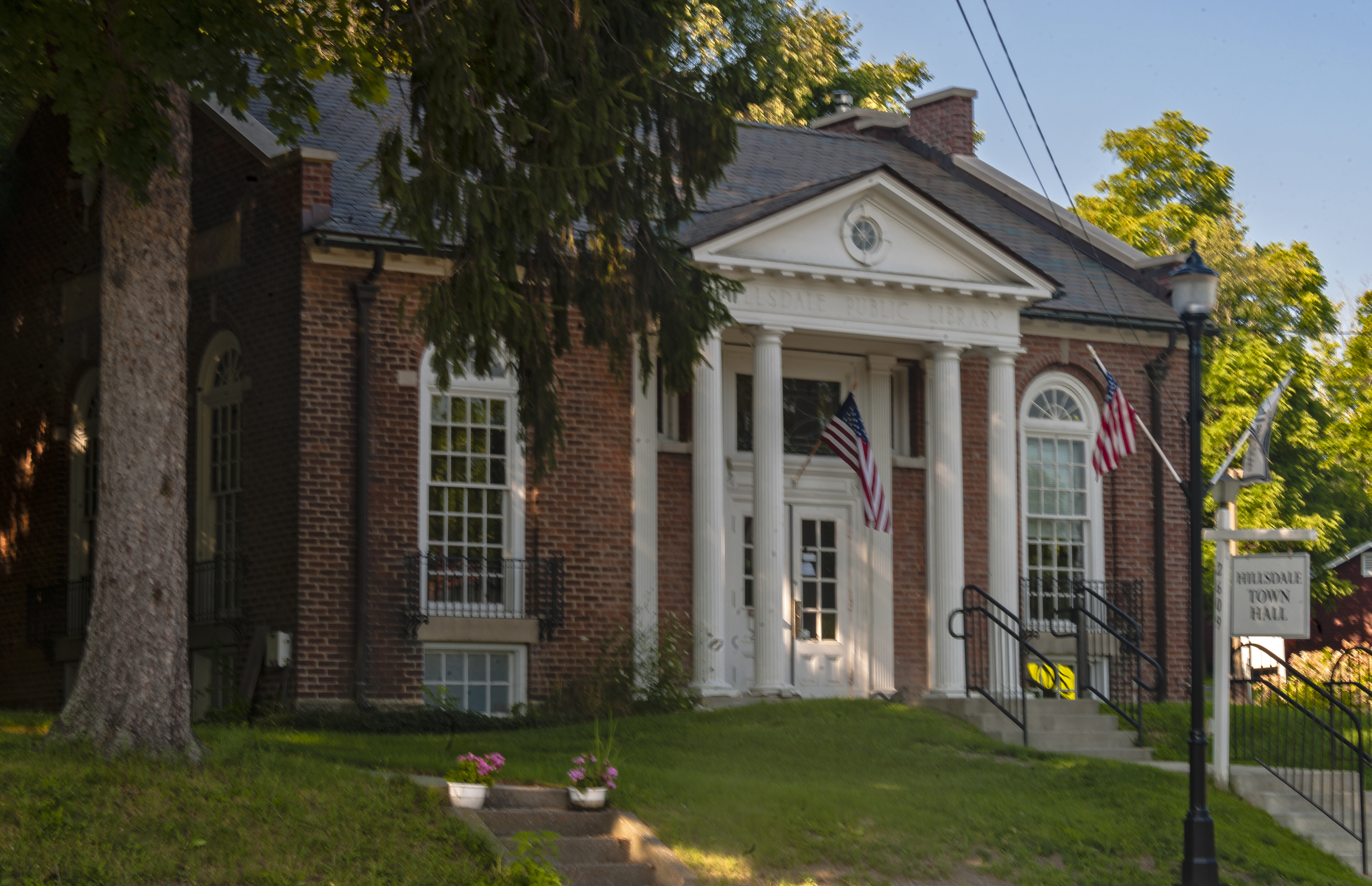
Town hall

The Oldtone Music Festival is held at Cool Whisper Farm on Route 21 in early September. Grass Fed Arts/Oldtone preserves roots music and traditional folkways through artist and audience participation; connecting neighbors, bridging cultures, and sharing insight and wisdom across generations.

== Notable residents, past and present ==
- Claire Danes, American actor, "My So-Called Life", "Homeland"
- Hugh Dancy, British actor, "Homeland", "Black Hawk Down", "Downton Abbey: A New Era"
- Brian Cox, Scottish actor, HBO series Succession, Broadway plays Great Society, Pretenders, Strange but True
- James Agee, writer
- Samuel Birdsall, U.S. congressman, studied law with Martin Van Buren
- Squire S. Case, New York legislator
- Peter Kane Dufault, poet
- Anna Roosevelt Halsted, writer
- John Krum, attorney, jurist, and mayor of St. Louis, Missouri and Alton, Illinois
- Henry Augustus Loop, painter
- John F. Collin, U.S. Congressman (1845–1846), Farmer, Historian
- John Cowper Powys, writer
- Michael Lally, Irish American poet, actor
- Walton Goggins, Actor, HBO series The White Lotus, Season 3, Fallout
