= Chichester House (Kingston, New York) =

Historic house in New York, United States

- U.S. National Register of Historic Places
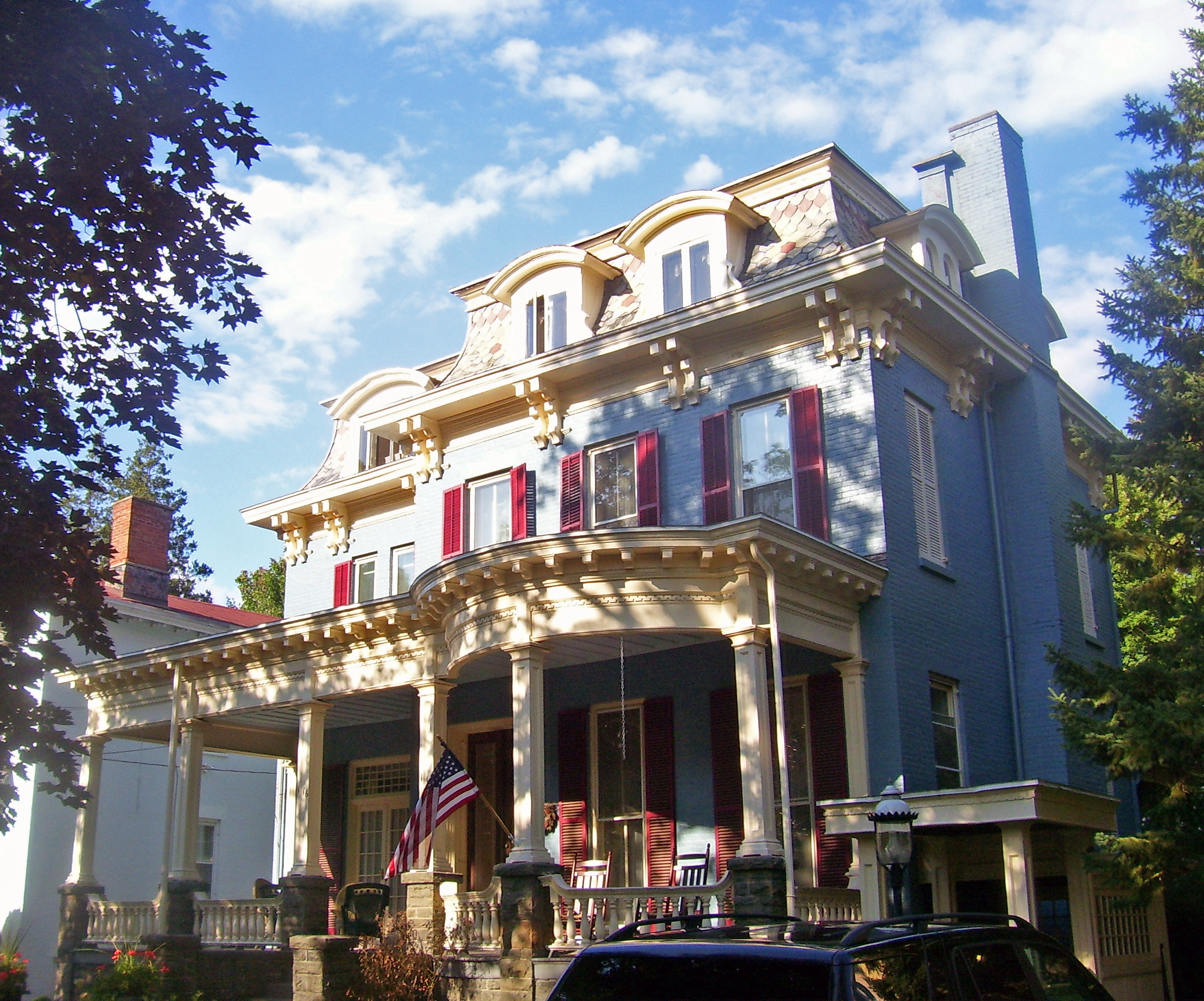
- West elevation, 2008

- Location within New York Location within the United States
- Interactive map showing the Chichester House
- Location: 116 Fair St., Kingston, New York
- Coordinates: 41°55′41″N 74°0′58″W
- Area: less than one acre
- Built: 1870
- Architectural style: Second Empire
- NRHP reference No.: 01001392
- Added to NRHP: December 28, 2001

The Chichester House is located on Fair Street in Kingston, New York, United States. It is a brick house in the Second Empire style built around 1870. In 2001 it was listed on the National Register of Historic Places (NRHP) along with the similar nearby Boice House.

It has a three-story three-by-three-bay main block on a stone and brick foundation with a slightly recessed north wing. On top is a concave mansard roof shingled in patterned slate, pierced by round-arched dormers with decorative trim. At the roofline is an ornate overhanging eave.

A front porch, rounded at the two southern bays, in the Classical Revival style covers all three bays of the main block and two in the north wing at the first story. Its posts are supported on stone piers. Behind it the main entrance leads into a narrow vestibule and then a wide side hallway with detailed ceiling moldings. Similar detail is evident in the carved balusters and newel on the main staircase. The two parlors to the south have modillioned ceilings and fireplaces with finely crafted architraves and surrounds. The north rooms are similarly treated.

Behind the house is its original carriage house, now used for storage. It is intact and thus considered a contributing resource to the NRHP listing.

It was built around 1870. The minimal records from that time, when it was one of the city's most affluent residential neighborhoods, show that it was home to a "Mrs. Chichester". It has remained a private home, relatively intact, ever since.

== See also ==
- National Register of Historic Places listings in Ulster County, New York
