= William S. Kenyon (New York politician) =

American politician

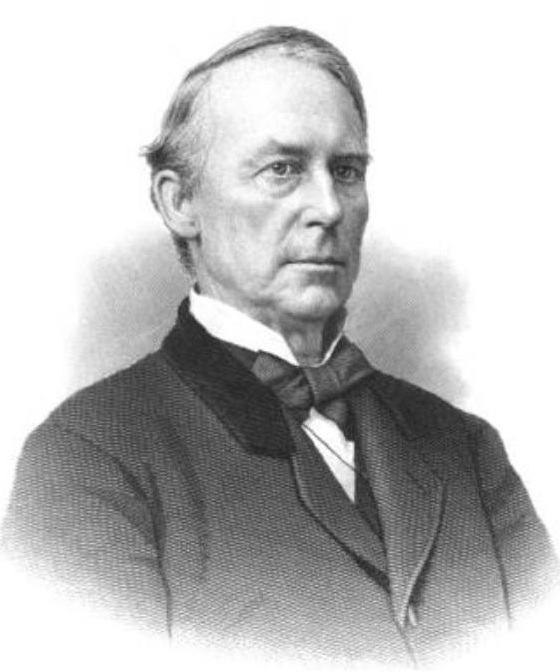

Member of the U.S. House of Representatives from New York's 11th district
- In office March 4, 1859 – March 3, 1861
- Preceded by: William Fiero Russell
- Succeeded by: John B. Steele

Personal details
- Born: William Scheuneman Kenyon; December 13, 1830 Catskill, New York, US
- Died: February 10, 1896 (aged 65) Kingston, New York, US
- Party: Republican
- Education: Rutgers College
- Occupation: Lawyer

William Scheuneman Kenyon (December 13, 1820 – February 10, 1896) was a U.S. representative from New York.

== Biography ==
Born in Catskill, New York, Kenyon attended a private academy in Catskill. He continued his education at the Kinderhook Academy, where his classmates included John Hazard Reynolds.

He graduated from Rutgers College in 1842, studied law with Marius Schoonmaker in Kingston, New York, was admitted to the bar in Albany, New York in 1846, and commenced practice in Kingston.

Kenyon was one of the incorporators of the Ulster County Savings Bank and served as a trustee for forty-four years.

In 1858, Kenyon was elected to the 36th Congress (March 4, 1859 – March 3, 1861) as a Republican. He was not a candidate for renomination in 1860 and returned to practicing law.

He served as chairman of the Ulster County Republican committee for many years, and was a delegate to the Republican National Conventions in 1872 and 1876.

He served as Judge of Ulster County from 1883 to 1889.

Kenyon died in Kingston on February 10, 1896. He was interred in Wiltwyck Rural Cemetery.

== Sources ==
- United States Congress. "William S. Kenyon (id: K000128)". Biographical Directory of the United States Congress.

U.S. House of Representatives
Preceded by William Fiero Russell	Member of the U.S. House of Representatives from New York's 11th congressional district 1859–1861	Succeeded by John B. Steele
