= Stephen Trowbridge =

Stephen Trowbridge may refer to:

- Stephen V. R. Trowbridge (Michigan legislator) (1794–1859)
- Stephen V. R. Trowbridge (Michigan Attorney General) (1855–1891)
