= David S. Walbridge =

American politician

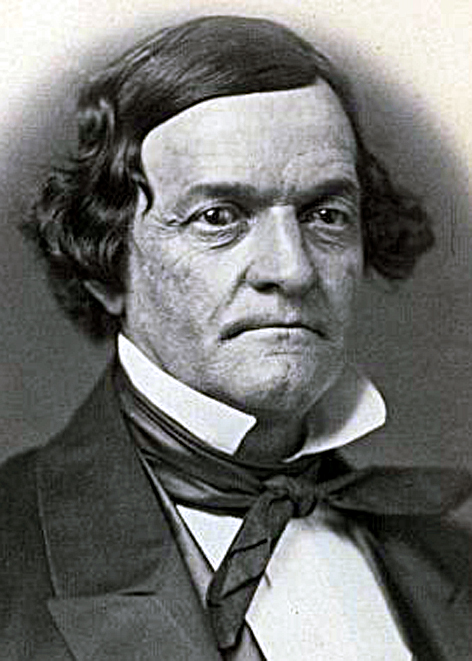
- From 1859's McClees' Gallery of Photographic Portraits of the Senators, Representatives & Delegates of the 35th Congress

Member of the U.S. House of Representatives from Michigan's 3rd district
- In office March 4, 1855 – March 3, 1859
- Preceded by: Samuel Clark
- Succeeded by: Francis William Kellogg

Personal details
- Born: David Safford Walbridge; July 30, 1802 Bennington, Vermont, U.S.
- Died: June 15, 1868 (aged 65) Kalamazoo, Michigan, U.S.
- Resting place: Mountain Home Cemetery
- Party: Republican

David Safford Walbridge (July 30, 1802 – June 15, 1868) was a 19th-century American businessman and politician who served two terms as a member of U.S. Congress from the U.S. state of Michigan from 1855 to 1859.

== Biography ==
Walbridge was born in Bennington, Vermont, where he attended the common schools.

=== Early business career ===
He moved to New York in 1820 and engaged in mercantile and agricultural pursuits at Geneseo from 1820 to 1826 and at Jamestown from 1826 to 1842. Then he moved to Kalamazoo, Michigan, in 1842 and again engaged in mercantile pursuits as well as becoming a large landowner and stock raiser.

=== Political career ===
Walbridge was a member of the Michigan State House of Representatives in 1848 and served from 1849 to 1850 in the Michigan Senate. He served as permanent chairman of the first Republican State convention held July 6, 1854, at Jackson, Michigan.

In 1854, he defeated incumbent Democrat Samuel Clark to be elected as a Republican from Michigan's 3rd congressional district to the 34th United States Congress. He was re-elected to the 35th Congress, serving from March 4, 1855, to March 3, 1859.

On August 27, 1856, Abraham Lincoln visited Kalamazoo to take part in a campaign rally for John C. Fremont. Congress was in session, so Walbridge was in Washington, D.C. In his absence, his wife Eliza Taggart Walbridge, acted as a hostess, providing tea for Lincoln and Zachariah Chandler. This was recalled by Lincoln in a letter he wrote to Chandler four years later.

=== Later career and death ===
David S. Walbridge later resumed his former pursuits and was also appointed by President Andrew Johnson to serve as postmaster of Kalamazoo, Michigan. He died there and was interred in Mountain Home Cemetery.

U.S. House of Representatives
Preceded by Samuel Clark	United States Representative for the 3rd congressional district of Michigan; 1855–1859	Succeeded by Francis William Kellogg
