= United States Senate Committee to Audit and Control the Contingent Expenses of the Senate =

This committee of the United States Senate was created November 4, 1807. On January 2, 1947, its functions were transferred to the Committee on Rules and Administration.

== Chairmen of the Committee to Audit and Control the Contingent Expenses of the Senate, 1811-1947 ==
- Michael Leib (R-PA) 1811-1815
- Abner Lacock (R-PA) 1815-1819
- Jonathan Roberts (R-PA) 1819-1821
- James Lanman (R-CT) 1821-1822
- Nathaniel Macon (R-NC) 1822-1823
- Horatio Seymour (R-VT) 1823-1826
- Elias Kane (D-IL) 1826-1830
- James Iredell (D-NC) 1830-1831
- Nehemiah Knight (NR/W-RI) 1831-1835
- Samuel McKean (D-PA) 1835-1839
- Nehemiah Knight (W-RI) 1839-1841
- Albert S. White (W-IN) 1841-1842
- Benjamin Tappan (D-OH) 1842-1845
- Jesse Speight (D-MS) 1845-1846
- Alpheus Felch (D-MI) 1847-1848
- Isaac P. Walker (D-WI) 1848-1849
- Augustus Dodge (D-IA) 1849-1853
- Josiah Evans (D-SC) 1853-1858
- William Wright (D-NJ) 1858-1859
- Andrew Johnson (D-TN) 1859-1861
- James Dixon (R-CT) 1861-1865
- B. Gratz Brown (R-MO) 1865-1866
- George H. Williams (R-OR) 1866-1867
- Aaron Cragin (R-NH) 1867-1870
- Orris S. Ferry (R-CT) 1870-1871
- Reuben Fenton (R-NY) 1871-1872
- Matthew Carpenter (R-WI) 1872-1875
- John P. Jones (R-NV) 1875-1879
- Benjamin Hill (D-GA) 1879-1881
- John P. Jones (R-NV) 1881-1893
- Edward Douglass White (D-LA) 1893-1894
- Johnson N. Camden (D-WV) 1894-1895
- John P. Jones (R-NV) 1895-1903
- John Kean (R-NJ) 1903-1911
- Frank O. Briggs (R-NJ) 1911-1913
- John Sharp Williams (D-MS) 1913-1916
- Luke Lea (D-TN) 1916-1917
- William H. Thompson (D-KS) 1917-1919
- William M. Calder (R-NY) 1919-1923
- Henry W. Keyes (R-NH) 1923-1927
- Charles S. Deneen (R-IL) 1927-1931
- John G. Townsend, Jr. (R-DE) 1931-1933
- James F. Byrnes (D-SC) 1933-1941
- Scott W. Lucas (D-IL) 1941-1947

== Sources ==
Chairmen of Senate Standing Committees U.S. Senate Historical Office, January 2005.
