= Theron R. Strong =

American judge (1802–1873)

Member of the U.S. House of Representatives from New York's 25th district
- In office March 4, 1839 – March 3, 1841
- Preceded by: Samuel Birdsall
- Succeeded by: John Maynard

Personal details
- Born: Theron Rudd Strong; November 7, 1802 Salisbury, Litchfield County, Connecticut
- Died: May 14, 1873 (aged 70)
- Resting place: Mount Hope Cemetery, Rochester
- Party: Democratic
- Education: Litchfield Law School
- Profession: Attorney, politician

Theron Rudd Strong (November 7, 1802 – May 14, 1873) was an American lawyer and politician from New York. From 1839 to 1841, he served one term in the U.S. House of Representatives.

== Life ==
He studied law at Litchfield Law School. He was admitted to the bar in 1821, and commenced practice in Palmyra. In 1833, he married Abbie Louise Hart (1814–1840), daughter of State Senator Truman Hart.

=== Family ===
He married secondly Cornelia Wheeler Barnes by whom he had a daughter named Cornelia Wheeler Strong, a descendant of Capt. Thomas Yale of the Yale family.

Theron R. Strong was District Attorney of Wayne County from 1835 to 1839.

Congressman William Strong, of Pennsylvania, was his cousin.

=== Congress ===
Strong was elected as a Democrat to the 26th United States Congress, serving from March 4, 1839, to March 3, 1841.

=== Later career ===
He was a member from Wayne County of the New York State Assembly in 1842.

He was a justice of the New York Supreme Court (7th District) from 1852 to 1859, and ex officio a judge of the New York Court of Appeals in 1858. He removed to Rochester, New York, the seat of the district bench, and afterwards resumed the practice of law there.

He removed to New York City in 1867, and continued the practice of law.

=== Death ===
He died on May 14, 1873 and was buried at the Mount Hope Cemetery, Rochester.

== Sources ==
- United States Congress. "Theron R. Strong (id: S001020)". Biographical Directory of the United States Congress.
- The New York Civil List compiled by Franklin Benjamin Hough (pages 227, 308, 352 and 384; Weed, Parsons and Co., 1858)
- Court of Appeals judges

U.S. House of Representatives
Preceded by Samuel Birdsall	Member of the U.S. House of Representatives from New York's 25th congressional district 1839–1841	Succeeded by John Maynard
