= Samuel Birdsall =

American politician

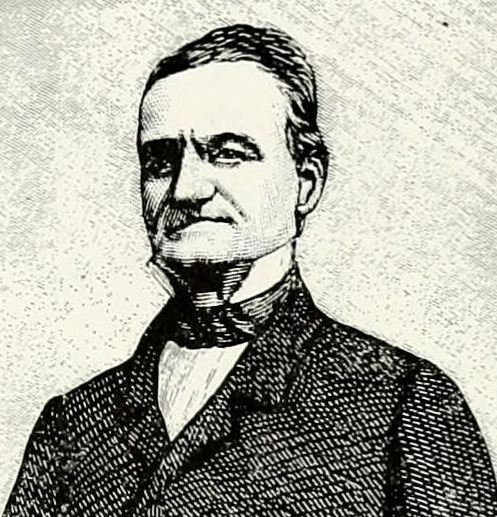

Member of the U.S. House of Representatives from New York's 25th district
- In office March 4, 1837 – March 3, 1839
- Preceded by: Graham H. Chapin
- Succeeded by: Theron R. Strong

Personal details
- Born: May 14, 1791 Hillsdale, New York, US
- Died: February 8, 1872 (aged 80) Waterloo, New York, US
- Resting place: Maple Grove Cemetery in Waterloo
- Party: Democratic Party
- Spouse: Ann Eliza Kendig Birdsall
- Children: Elizabeth Lucinda Birdsall Wheeler; Franklin Samuel Birdsall; Walter Birdsall
- Profession: Lawyer; Judge; Politician

Military service
- Branch/service: New York Militia
- Rank: Colonel
- Unit: 21st Division of Infantry

Samuel Birdsall (May 14, 1791 – February 8, 1872) was an American lawyer and politician who served one term as a U.S. Representative from New York from 1837 to 1839.

== Biography ==
Born in Hillsdale, New York, Birdsall attended the common schools and studied law in the office of Martin Van Buren. He was admitted to the bar in 1812 and commenced practice in Cooperstown, New York.

=== Family ===
He married Ann Eliza Kendig and they had three children.

=== Early career ===
Birdsall served as a master in chancery in 1815 and moved to Waterloo, New York, in 1817. In 1819 he was commissioned Judge Advocate of the New York Militia's 21st Division with the rank of colonel. He was counselor in the supreme court and solicitor in chancery in 1823. He served as surrogate court judge of Seneca County from 1827 to 1837 and was a state bank commissioner in 1832.

=== Tenure in Congress ===
Elected as a Democrat to the Twenty-fifth Congress, Birdsall was United States Representative for the twenty-fifth district of New York from March 4, 1837, to March 3, 1839.

=== Later career ===
Not a candidate for renomination in 1838, Birdsall was admitted to practice before the United States Supreme Court in 1838; and served as district attorney of Seneca County in 1846. He was Postmaster of Waterloo, New York, from 1853 to 1863.

== Death ==
Birdsall died in Waterloo on February 8, 1872 (age 80 years, 270 days). He is interred at Maple Grove Cemetery in Waterloo.

U.S. House of Representatives
Preceded by Graham H. Chapin	Representative of the 25th Congressional District of New York; March 4, 1837 – March 3, 1839	Succeeded by Theron R. Strong
