= Kelloggville =

Kelloggville is the name of a historical community and post office located in what was once Paris Township and Wyoming Township, Kent County in the U.S. state of Michigan. The area is now within the cities of Kentwood, Wyoming, and Grand Rapids.

The community was named for Francis William Kellogg, who located the headquarters of his lumbering firm, Kellogg, White & Co., there about 1845.

The first permanent white settler was said to be Alexander Clark, who arrived in 1837.
