= John P. Jones (Nevada politician) =

American politician (1829–1912)

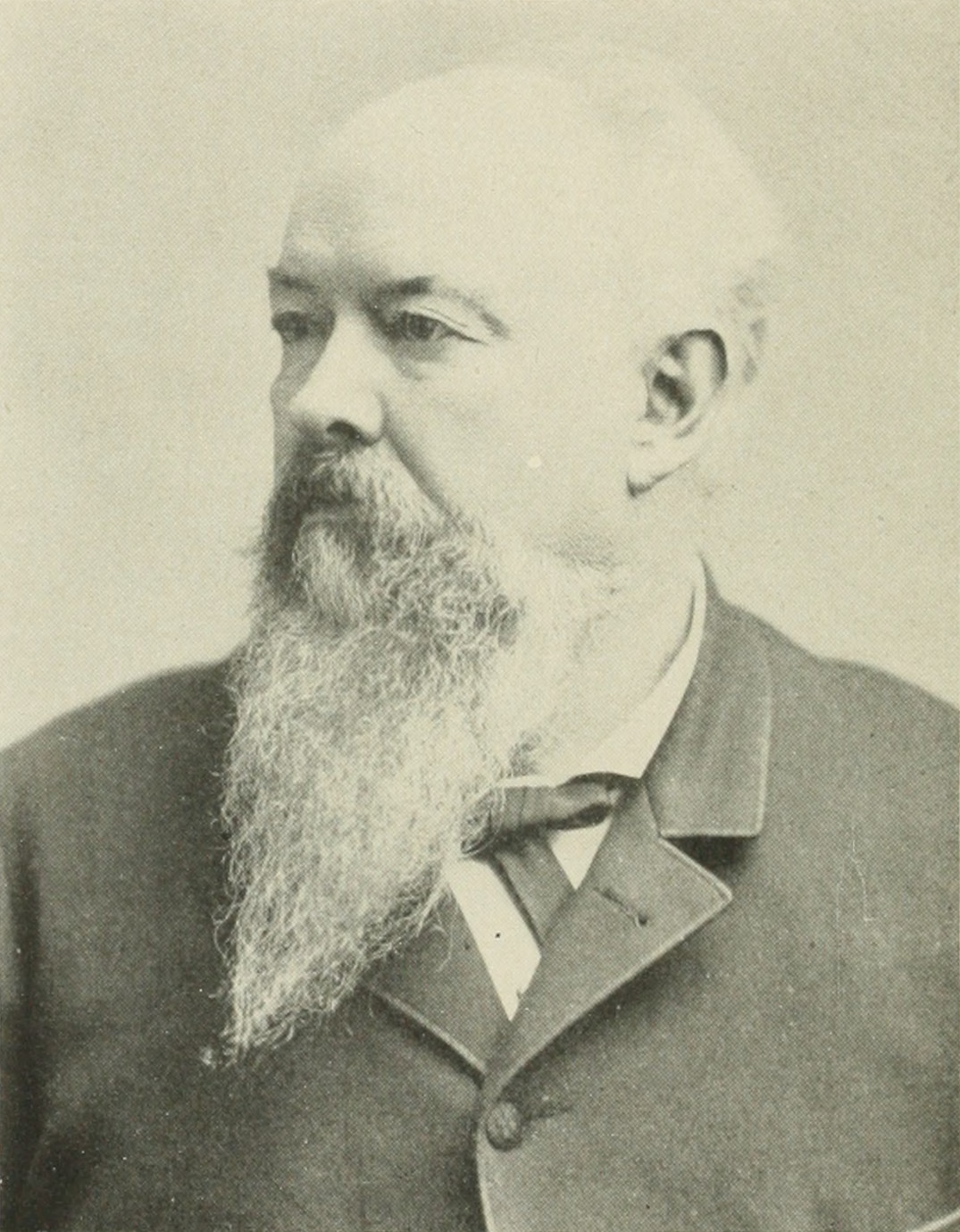
- Jones c. 1899

United States Senator from Nevada
- In office March 4, 1873 – March 3, 1903
- Preceded by: James W. Nye
- Succeeded by: Francis G. Newlands

Personal details
- Born: January 27, 1829 Herefordshire, England
- Died: November 27, 1912 (aged 83) Los Angeles, California, U.S.
- Party: Republican; Silver (1895-1901)
- Spouse(s): Hannah Cornelia Conger (m. 1861; died 1871) Georgina Frances Sullivan (m. 1875)
- Children: Roy; Alice; Marion; Georgina
- Relatives: Charles C. Conger (brother-in-law); James L. Conger (uncle-in-law)
- Profession: Mining

John Percival Jones (January 27, 1829 – November 27, 1912) was an American politician who served for 30 years as a Republican United States Senator from Nevada. He made a fortune in silver mining and was a co-founder of the town of Santa Monica, California.

== Early life ==
John P. Jones was born on January 27, 1829, in the county of Herefordshire, England. He is one of thirteen children to Thomas Jones (1793–1871) and Mary A. Jones. The family immigrated to the United States and settled in Cleveland, Ohio, in 1831. Thomas Jones purchased property, and established himself in business as a marble manufacturer.

== California Gold Rush ==
In 1849 John P. Jones went to California to participate in the Gold rush. He settled in Trinity County, California, where he engaged in mining and farming. He served as county sheriff, and was a member of the California State Senate from 1863 to 1867. In 1867 he was the nominee of the Republican Party for Lieutenant Governor of California.

== Comstock Lode Nevada ==
In 1868, Jones moved to Gold Hill, Nevada, where he was superintendent of the Crown Point silver mine which was part of the Comstock Lode. When a body of silver ore was stuck in 1870, Jones and Alvinza Hayward acquired shares and were able to gain control of the Crown Point mine.

== United States Senate ==
Jones, undated

In 1873 he was elected by the Nevada Legislature to the United States Senate, in which he served five terms from 1873 to 1903. He served as chairman of the Senate Committee on Auditing the Contingent Expenses from 1877 to 1881 and from 1883 to 1893, and as chairman of the committee on epidemic diseases from 1893 to 1903. Jones was involved with the minting of the twenty-cent piece silver coin. Like many Republicans from the western United States, Jones left the party in 1896 over the issue of bimetalism and joined the Silver Party. He caucused with the Silver Republicans and later rejoined the Republican Party, but decided not to run for re-election to the Senate in 1902. Jones was a strong proponent of racist immigration policy, arguing on the Senate floor for the exclusion of the "tawny and the black races, in order that our own race may be kept intact and uncontaminated", and writing in favor of the Chinese Exclusion Act.".

== Panamint Silver Mines ==
In 1874, Jones and fellow Nevada senator, William M. Stewart, invested in the Panamint silver mines near Independence, Inyo County, California. Jones planned to build a railroad from the mines to the ocean at Santa Monica. By 1877, the Panamint mines were exhausted and closed.

== Santa Monica ==
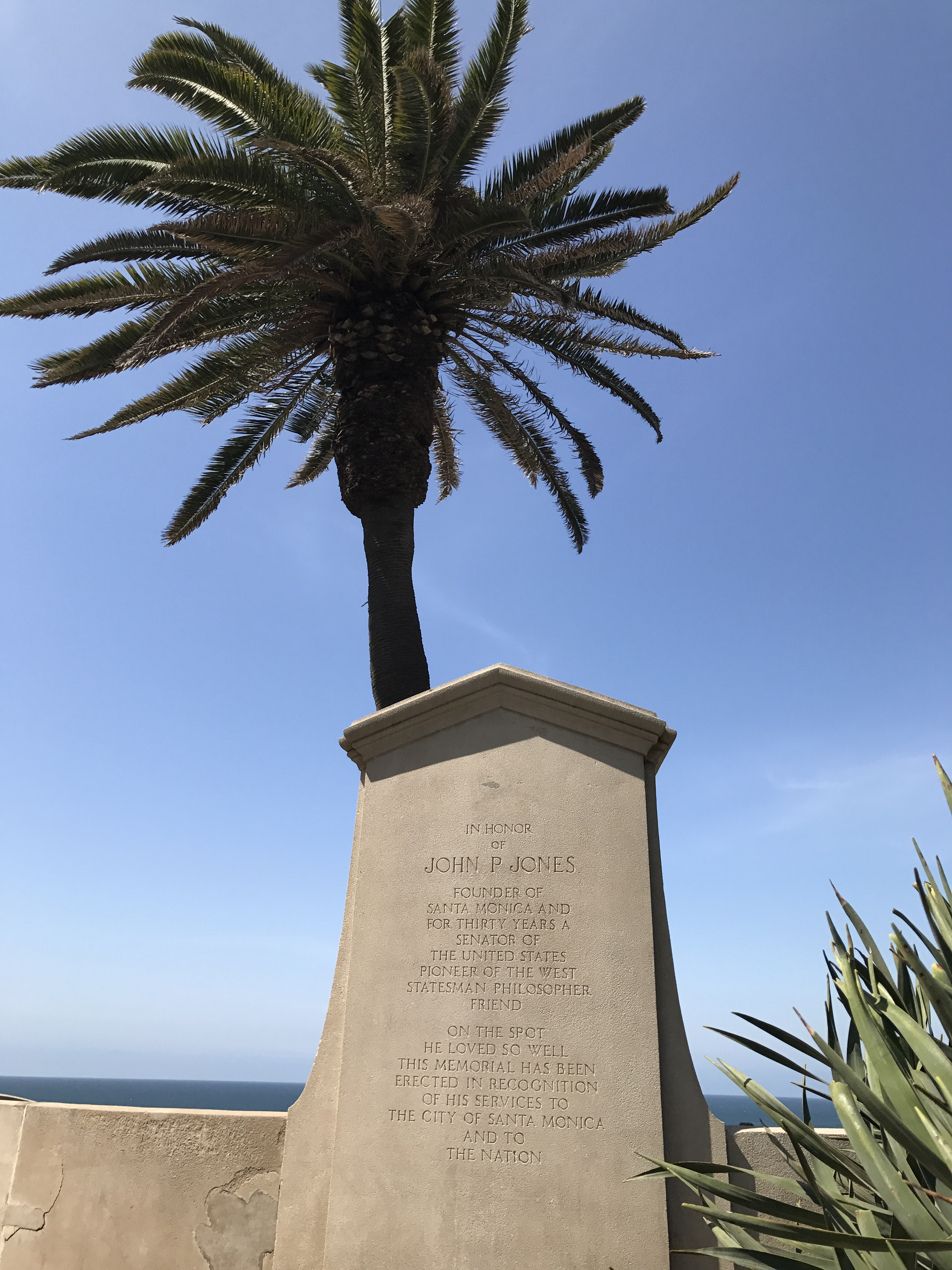
Monument to John P. Jones in Palisades Park

Jones visited Los Angeles in 1874 and bought a three quarter interest in Colonel Robert S. Baker's ranch in Santa Monica. In 1875, Jones and Baker laid out the town of Santa Monica. Jones built the first railroad (Los Angeles and Independence Railroad) from Los Angeles to Santa Monica. Due to financial pressures, Jones was forced to sell the railroad to Southern Pacific in 1877.

Since 2000, there has been a nightclub in Santa Monica called Senator Jones.

== Miramar ==
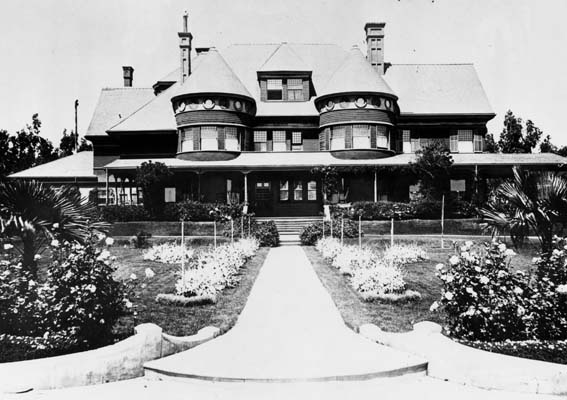
Miramar, Jones' famous Santa Monica home, in 1890

In 1903 Jones retired to his 1889 home, Miramar, in Santa Monica where he continued to oversee his businesses. Shortly before he died, Miramar was sold to King Gillette. Gillette rarely visited the house, and after a brief spell towards the end of World War I as a boys military academy, the estate was sold to hotelier Gilbert Stevenson and it became the Hotel Miramar in 1921. Since then, it has been run by various hoteliers — except for during World War II, when the Army Air Corps took over the Miramar and used it as a redistribution center for officers and enlisted men returning from overseas. The mansion was demolished in 1938, leaving as the oldest structure, the six story "Palisades" wing built in 1924. The Moreton Bay Fig Tree, given to the Jones’ by the bartender in 1889, still stands where it was planted by gardener W.H. Lee. The site is now the home of the Fairmont Miramar Hotel.

== Family life ==
Jones married the widow Hannah Cornelia (Conger) Greathouse, in 1861, and they had one son, Roy Jones. Hannah was the niece of former Congressman James L. Conger and sister of future California State Senator Charles C. Conger. Hannah died in 1871, and Jones married Georgina Frances Sullivan in 1875. They had three daughters, Alice (MacMonnies), Marion (Farquhar) and Georgina (Walton).

Jones died in 1912 in Los Angeles, California, and was buried in Laurel Hill Cemetery in San Francisco, California.

== See also ==
- List of United States senators who switched parties
- List of United States senators born outside the United States
- Donated land for Old Santa Monica Forestry Station

U.S. Senate
Preceded by James W. Nye	U.S. senator (Class 3) from Nevada; 1873–1903; Served alongside: William M. Stewart, William Sharon, James G. Fair	Succeeded by Francis G. Newlands
Political offices
Preceded by Matthew H. Carpenter; Wisconsin	Chairman of the United States Senate Committee to Audit and Control the Contingent Expenses of the Senate; 1875–1879	Succeeded by Benjamin Harvey Hill; Georgia
Preceded by Benjamin Harvey Hill; Georgia	Chairman of the United States Senate Committee to Audit and Control the Contingent Expenses of the Senate; 1881–1893	Succeeded by Edward Douglass White; Louisiana
Preceded by Johnson N. Camden; West Virginia	Chairman of the United States Senate Committee to Audit and Control the Contingent Expenses of the Senate; 1895–1903	Succeeded by John Kean; New Jersey
