= 1866 National Union Convention =

Political conventions in Philadelphia

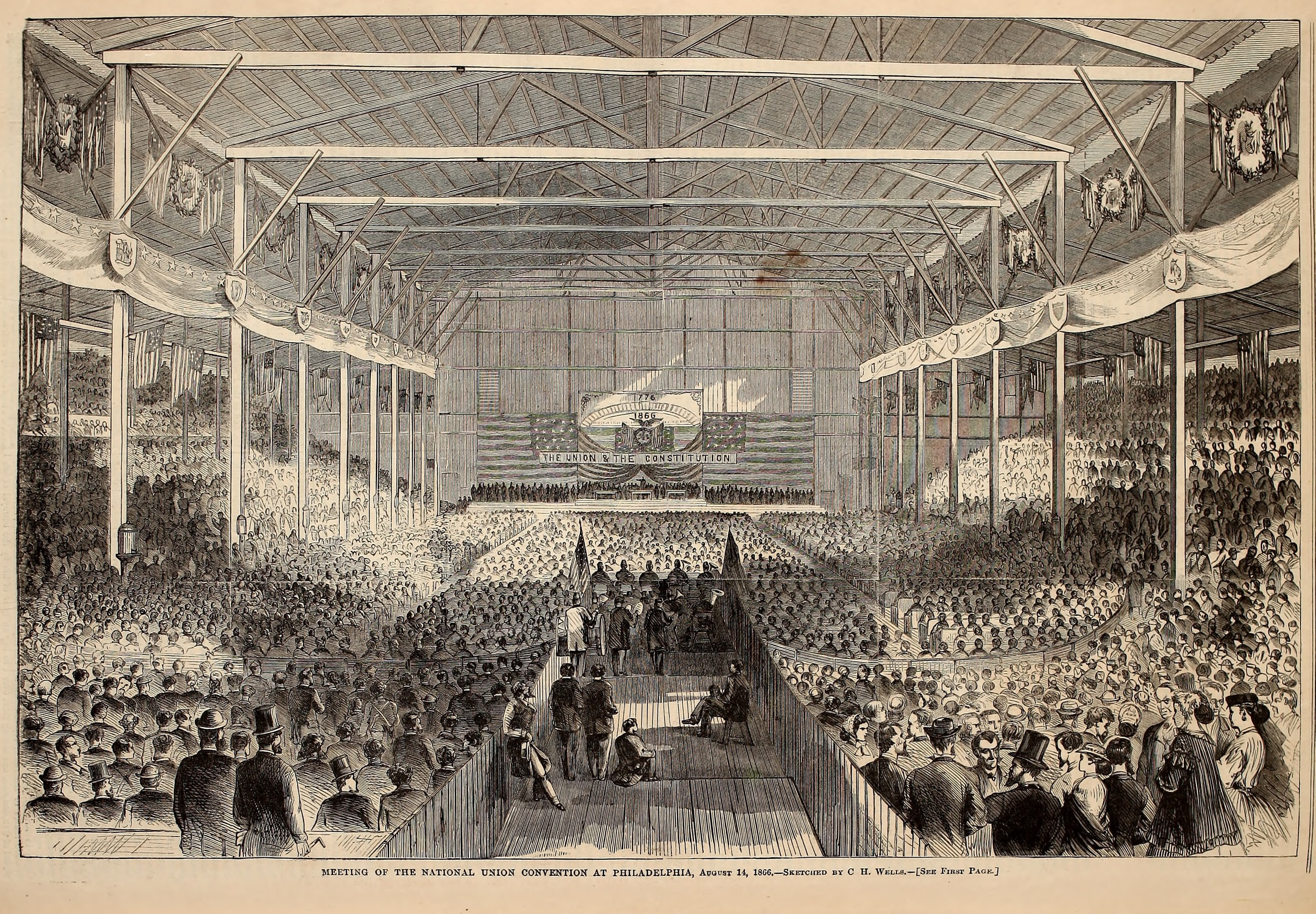
Meeting of the National Union Convention at Philadelphia, August 14, 1866—Sketched by C. H. Wells (Harper's Weekly, September 1, 1866)

The National Union Convention (also known as the Arm-In-Arm Convention) was held on August 14–16, 1866, in Philadelphia, Pennsylvania.

== Convention ==
The convention was called in Philadelphia before the midterm elections of 1866, in an attempt to encourage political support for US President Andrew Johnson, who was under attack by both moderate and Radical Republicans. Johnson's friends tried to rally support for his lenient pro-South Reconstruction policies. Some hoped to create a new political party, but that goal was not realized. For their part, Republican-aligned newspapers called it the Rebel–Johnson convention, insinuating Johnson's true loyalty was to the Confederacy.

Delegates gathered at a hastily built temporary structure that was designed to accommodate the several thousand people expected to attend. Formally called "the Wigwam," the immense edifice was on Girard Avenue, between 19th and 20th Streets, across from Philadelphia's Girard College.

About 7000 prominent politicians and activists attended the convention. At its opening, representatives from Massachusetts (General Darius Nash Couch) and South Carolina (Governor James Lawrence Orr) paraded arm-in-arm to symbolize national reconciliation and social equity. The convention was called to order by US Postmaster General Alexander Randall. General (and former New York Governor and Senator) John Adams Dix served as the temporary chairman and Wisconsin Senator James R. Doolittle served as permanent convention president.

In the end, the convention was not successful in unifying the country behind Johnson. He launched a speaking tour (known as the "Swing Around the Circle") hoping to regain public and political support. On the speaking tour, Johnson at times attacked his Republican opponents with crude and abusive language and on several occasions appeared to have had too much to drink. Ultimately, the tour was a disaster for Johnson and emboldened Congress to override him and to impeach him in 1868.

== Aftermath ==
In an effort to counter the National Union Convention's support for Johnson, a group of Southern Radical Republicans who opposed Johnson's Reconstruction policy organized the Southern Loyalists' Convention, which was held on September 3, 1866 in Philadelphia's Independence Hall.

The September convention voted on a resolution supporting black suffrage. Governor Arthur I. Boreman argued against it as "we did not come here to commit suicide" and that passing the resolution would have them "damned to all eternity". Frederick Douglass, attending the convention despite pleas from Oliver P. Morton, was one of two black delegates to the convention and argued for passing the resolution.

On September 7, delegates to the Southern Loyalists' Convention voted to pass a resolution endorsing universal male suffrage.

== Notable attendees ==
Notable attendees of the National Union Convention include:

- Augustus C. Baldwin, U.S. Representative from Michigan
- John Minor Botts, U.S. Representative from Virginia
- Augustus Brandegee, U.S. Representative from Connecticut
- George Briggs, U.S. Representative from New York
- Ralph P. Buckland, U.S. Representative from Ohio
- Darius Couch, U.S. Army General
- John Covode, U.S. Representative from Pennsylvania
- Edgar Cowan, U.S. Senator from Pennsylvania
- James A. Cravens, U.S. Representative from Indiana
- William Earl Dodge, U.S. Representative from New York
- James Rood Doolittle, U.S. Senator from Wisconsin
- William McKee Dunn, U.S. Representative from Indiana
- Joseph Barton Elam, U.S. Representative from Louisiana
- James Edward English, U.S. Representative and U.S. Senator from Connecticut
- Nathan A. Farwell, U.S. Senator from Maine
- Thomas W. Ferry, U.S. Representative and U.S. Senator from Michigan
- Horace Greeley, publisher and U.S. Representative from New York
- William S. Groesbeck, state legislator from Ohio
- Andrew Jackson Hamilton, U.S. Representative from Texas
- Aaron Harding, U.S. Representative from Kentucky
- James Harlan, U.S. Senator from Iowa
- James K. Holland, state legislator from Texas
- Samuel Hooper, U.S. Representative from Massachusetts
- George S. Houston, U.S. Representative from Alabama
- Jacob Merritt Howard, U.S. Senator from Michigan
- Reverdy Johnson, U.S. Senator from Maryland
- William Lawrence, U.S. Representative from Ohio
- John Wesley Longyear, U.S. Representative from Michigan
- Samuel S. Marshall, U.S. Representative from Illinois
- Horace Maynard, U.S. Representative from Tennessee
- Robert Mallory, U.S. Representative from Kentucky
- Thomas Amos Rogers Nelson, U.S. Representative from Tennessee
- Richard Oglesby, Governor of Illinois
- James Lawrence Orr, Governor of South Carolina
- Halbert E. Paine, U.S. Representative from Wisconsin
- George Hunt Pendleton, U.S. Senator from Ohio
- Cyrus L. Pershing, jurist and later candidate for Governor of Pennsylvania
- Thomas G. Pratt, Governor and U.S. Senator from Maryland
- Henry Jarvis Raymond, U.S. Representative from New York
- James S. Rollins, U.S. Representative from Missouri
- Robert Cumming Schenck, U.S. Representative from Ohio
- James Speed, U.S. Attorney General
- John Dodson Stiles, U.S. Representative from Pennsylvania
- Byron Gray Stout, U.S. Representative from Michigan
- John L.N. Stratton, U.S. Representative from New Jersey
- Lorenzo D.M. Sweat, U.S. Representative from Maine
- William Barrett Washburn, U.S. Representative from Massachusetts
- Peter Godwin Van Winkle, U.S. Senator from West Virginia
- Fernando Wood, copperhead Mayor of New York City

Clement Vallandigham, a copperhead from Ohio, was elected to the convention but withdrew to avoid disturbing the harmony of the convention.

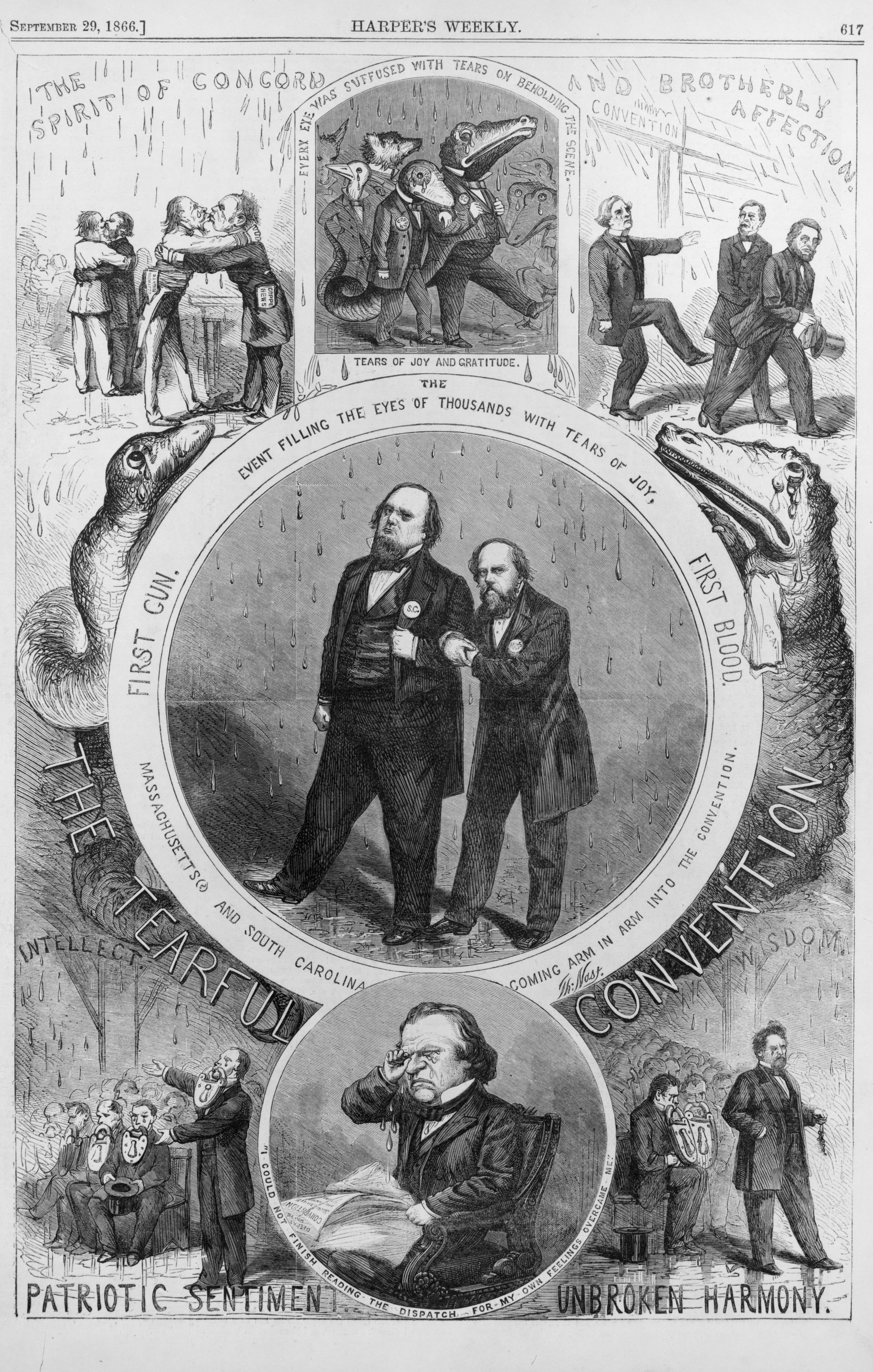
Thomas Nast's rendition of news reports about the convention

== See also ==
- National Union Party (United States)
- 1864 National Union National Convention

== Works cited ==
- Abbott, Richard (1986). The Republican Party and the South, 1855–1877: The First Southern Strategy. University of North Carolina Press. ISBN 0807816809.
- McKitrick, Eric (1960). Andrew Johnson and Reconstruction. University of Chicago Press. pp. 394–420. LCCN 60005467. OCLC 1476846.
- Wagstaff, Thomas (1968). "The Arm-in-Arm Convention". Civil War History. 14 (2): 101–119. doi:10.1353/cwh.1968.0036. S2CID 144301855.
