= Hestor L. Stevens =

American politician (1803–1864)

Member of the U.S. House of Representatives from Michigan's 4th district
- In office March 4, 1853 – March 3, 1855
- Preceded by: Office established
- Succeeded by: George Washington Peck

Personal details
- Born: October 1, 1803 Lima, New York, U.S.
- Died: May 7, 1864 (aged 60) Washington, D.C., U.S.
- Party: Democratic

Hestor Lockhart Stevens (October 1, 1803 – May 7, 1864) was a politician from the U.S. state of Michigan.

Stevens was born in Lima, New York and attended the common schools. He studied law, was admitted to the bar and commenced practice in Rochester, New York. He ranked as major general of militia of western New York.

Stevens later moved to Pontiac, Michigan. In 1852, he was elected as a Democrat from Michigan's newly created 4th congressional district to the 33rd United States Congress, serving from March 4, 1853 to March 3, 1855.

Stevens was not a candidate for re-election in 1854 and resumed the practice of law in Washington, D.C. He died in Washington, D.C., and is interred there in Oak Hill Cemetery.

U.S. House of Representatives
Preceded by None	United States Representative for the 4th congressional district of Michigan; 1853–1855	Succeeded by George Washington Peck
