= Samuel Clark (New York and Michigan politician) =

American politician (1800–1870)

Member of the U.S. House of Representatives from Michigan's 3rd district
- In office March 4, 1853 – March 3, 1855
- Preceded by: James L. Conger
- Succeeded by: David S. Walbridge

Member of the U.S. House of Representatives from New York's 25th district
- In office March 4, 1833 – March 3, 1835
- Preceded by: Gamaliel H. Barstow
- Succeeded by: Graham H. Chapin

Personal details
- Born: January 1800 Cayuga County, New York
- Died: October 2, 1870 (aged 70) Kalamazoo, Michigan
- Party: Jacksonian; Democratic
- Occupation: lawyer

Samuel Clark (January 1800 – October 2, 1870) was an American lawyer and politician. He served as a U.S. representative for both New York (1833 to 1835) and Michigan (1853 to 1855).

== Biography ==
Clark was born in Cayuga County, New York. He attended Hamilton College in Clinton and studied law in Auburn.

In 1826 he was admitted to the bar and commenced the practice of law in Waterloo.

=== Congress ===
He was elected as a Jacksonian from New York's 25th congressional district to the Twenty-third Congress, serving from March 4, 1833 to March 3, 1835.

After leaving Congress, he resumed his practice at Waterloo. In 1842, he moved to Kalamazoo, Michigan, and began a law practice there and became recognized as one of the leading lawyers in the state.

Clark was a member of the Michigan State Constitutional Convention in 1850. In 1852, he was elected as a Democrat from Michigan's 3rd congressional district to the Thirty-third Congress, serving from March 4, 1853 to March 3, 1855.

He lost to Republican David S. Walbridge in the general election of 1854.

=== Later career and death ===
On July 17, 1856, President Franklin Pierce nominated Clark to be register of the land office in the northeastern land district of Minnesota Territory.

He discontinued the practice of his profession and retired from political activities. He became greatly interested in agricultural pursuits. He died in Kalamazoo and is interred in Mountain Home Cemetery.

U.S. House of Representatives
| Preceded by Gamaliel H. Barstow | Member of the U.S. House of Representatives from New York's 25th congressional district 1833–1835 | Succeeded by Graham H. Chapin |
| Preceded by James L. Conger | Member of the U.S. House of Representatives from Michigan's 3rd congressional district 1853–1855 | Succeeded by David S. Walbridge |
