= Alfred Eliab Buck =

American politician (1832–1902)

Alfred E. Buck
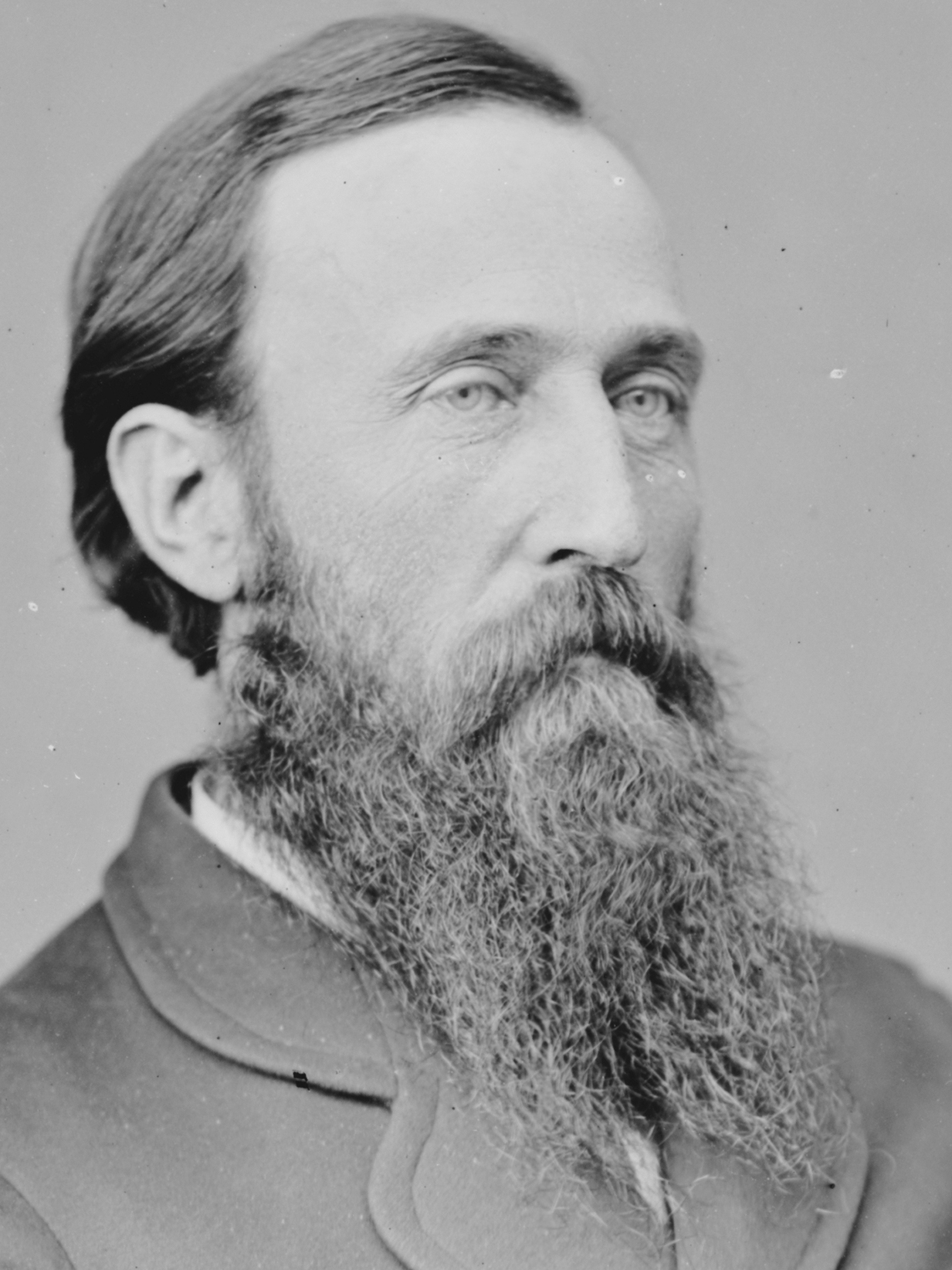

United States Minister to Japan
- In office June 3, 1898 – December 4, 1902
- President: William McKinley; Theodore Roosevelt
- Preceded by: Edwin Dun
- Succeeded by: Lloyd Carpenter Griscom

Member of the U.S. House of Representatives from Alabama's 1st district
- In office March 4, 1869 – March 3, 1871
- Preceded by: Francis W. Kellogg
- Succeeded by: Benjamin S. Turner

Personal details
- Born: Alfred Eliab Buck; February 7, 1832 Foxcroft, Maine, U.S.
- Died: December 4, 1902 (aged 70) Tokyo, Japan
- Resting place: Arlington National Cemetery
- Party: Republican
- Education: Waterville College
- Nickname: "Boss Buck"

Alfred Eliab Buck (February 7, 1832 – December 4, 1902) was an American Civil War veteran, diplomat, and politician who served one term as a U.S. representative from Alabama from 1869 to 1871.

== Biography ==
Born in Foxcroft, Maine, Buck graduated from Waterville College (now Colby College) in 1859. On his 20th birthday, he wrote that he supported "immediate emancipation" rather than "gradual emancipation" for enslaved African Americans in the Southern states. He stated that "the slavery interest is simply too dug in for a gradual process...if such a process were to begin, it would have had to have done so over forty or fifty years ago." He outspokenly praised the efforts of "radical abolitionists", such as the Boston Vigilance Committee and the Massachusetts Anti-Slavery Society. Buck was outspoken about the "heinous abduction" of Anthony Burns from Boston.

=== Civil War ===
During the Civil War, he entered the Union Army as captain of Company C, Thirteenth Regiment, Maine Volunteer Infantry. He was appointed lieutenant colonel of the Ninety-first United States Colored Troops in August 1863, was transferred to the Fifty-first United States Colored Troops in October 1864, and was made brevetted colonel of Volunteers for gallant conduct. He was mustered out of the service at Baton Rouge, Louisiana, in June 1866.

=== Early career ===
Buck then began to work in southern Alabama as an officer of the Freedmen's Bureau. He served as delegate to the constitutional convention of Alabama in 1867, and as clerk of the circuit court of Mobile County in 1867 and 1868. He moved his family to Mobile, where he became involved in the manufacture of turpentine on Montgomery Island in Mobile until a fire destroyed his business in 1867. He also entered into the iron-smelting business with his brother-in-law, William B. Wood, who would later serve on the U.S. Supreme Court from 1881 to 1887.

Buck ran for Congress in 1868, to represent Alabama's 1st District, which at the time included both Selma and Mobile. Due to the laws of the reconstruction government, most people who fought for the Confederacy were ineligible to vote in that election. As a result, a large majority of the voters in that election were newly freed African Americans. Local whites were furious at the prospect of being outvoted by African Americans, and the local Ku Klux Klan was formed in an attempt to prevent voting in Alabama's first district congressional election. However, the United States Army occupied the area in enough force to prevent the Klan from disrupting that particular election. As a result, Buck won the election.

=== Congress ===
Buck was elected as a Republican to the Forty-first Congress (March 4, 1869 – March 3, 1871). During his time as a congressman, he was labeled as a "Radical Republican", a label that he said he "wore with pride". Buck came to believe that going into business would be both more lucrative and more fulfilling than another term in Congress, so, instead of running for re-election, he endorsed and campaigned for Benjamin S. Turner, an African-American Republican, in Turner's successful bid to succeed him in representing Alabama's 1st congressional district.

=== Later career ===
Buck was later appointed president of the city council of Mobile in 1873. He served as clerk of the United States circuit and district courts in Atlanta, Georgia from 1874 to 1889. He was later appointed United States marshal for the northern district of Georgia by President Benjamin Harrison, and he served in such capacity from 1889 to 1893.

In 1896, Buck was the leader of the Georgia Republican Party. Buck was the president of the Republican State Convention in late April, and he presided over the electing of delegates to the 1896 Republican National Convention. There was a dispute over the delegates, which Buck attempted to preempt by passing a "harmony" slate of delegates outside of standard procedure. However, the slate did not include Emanuel K. Love's friend, Richard R. Wright, who many believed would be a delegate. The convention erupted in protest, a representative of Buck's attempted to adjourn the meeting, and the Buck faction left the hall. The Love and Wright faction remained, and Love took the chair, electing a new slate of delegates, now including Love (and Buck, but still not Wright). Eventually, Buck was a delegate and Wright attended as an alternate delegate.

=== Diplomat ===
Buck was appointed Minister to Japan by President William McKinley in April 1897. During his term, the United States was deeply involved in Pacific affairs. Buck explained to Japanese officials American policy regarding the Spanish-American War, the annexation of Hawaii, the Boxer Rebellion in China, and the "Open Door Notes" presented by Secretary of State John Hay to limit foreign control of China.

He served until his death in Tokyo, on December 4, 1902. He was interred in Arlington National Cemetery.

== See also ==
U.S. House of Representatives
Preceded by Francis W. Kellogg	Member of the U.S. House of Representatives from Alabama's 1st congressional district 1869 – 1871	Succeeded by Benjamin S. Turner
