= Graham H. Chapin =

American politician

Member of the House of Representatives from New York's 25th District
- In office March 4, 1835 – March 3, 1837
- Preceded by: Samuel Clark
- Succeeded by: Samuel Birdsall

District attorney of Wayne County
- In office 1829–1830

Personal details
- Born: Graham Hurd Chapin; February 10, 1799 Salisbury, Connecticut
- Died: September 8, 1843 (aged 44) Mount Morris, New York
- Resting place: Mount Hope Cemetery in Rochester, NY
- Party: Jacksonian
- Education: = Yale College

Graham Hurd Chapin (February 10, 1799 – September 8, 1843) was an American lawyer and politician who served one term as a U.S. representative from New York from 1835 to 1837.

== Biography ==
Born in Salisbury, Connecticut, Chapin moved to Lyons, New York in 1817. He graduated from Yale College in 1819. He studied law. Chapin was married to Caroline Holley, daughter of Myron Holley.

=== Legal career ===
He was admitted to the bar in 1823 and practiced in Lyons. Surrogate of Wayne County from 1826 to 1833.

== Political career ==
He served as district attorney of Wayne County in 1829 and 1830. He moved to Rochester, New York, in 1833 and continued the practice of law.

=== Congress ===
Chapin was elected as a Jacksonian to the Twenty-fourth Congress, serving from March 4, 1835 to March 3, 1837.

== Death ==
He died in Mount Morris, New York, September 8, 1843, and was buried in Mount Hope Cemetery in Rochester, NY.

U.S. House of Representatives
Preceded by Samuel Clark	Member of the U.S. House of Representatives from New York's 25th congressional district March 4, 1835 – March 3, 1837	Succeeded by Samuel Birdsall
