= George Washington Peck =

American politician (1818–1905)

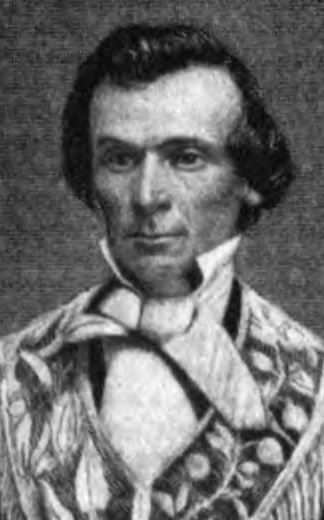
- From Volume 1 (1897) of Freemasonry in Michigan

Member of the U.S. House of Representatives from Michigan's 4th district
- In office March 4, 1855 – March 3, 1857
- Preceded by: Hestor L. Stevens
- Succeeded by: De Witt C. Leach

Personal details
- Born: June 4, 1818 New York City, U.S.
- Died: June 30, 1905 (aged 87) Saginaw, Michigan, U.S.
- Party: Democratic

George Washington Peck (June 4, 1818 – June 30, 1905) was a United States representative from the state of Michigan.

== Biography ==
Peck was born in New York City and pursued classical studies, attending Yale College and studying law in New York City. He moved to Michigan in 1839 and settled in Brighton, where he was admitted to the bar in 1842 and commenced practice there in the same year. He was a member of the Michigan State House of Representatives in 1846 and 1847 and served as speaker the last term. He moved to Lansing, when the state capital was located there in 1847. He was the first postmaster of Lansing and was Michigan Secretary of State from 1848 to 1849. He was editor and proprietor of the Lansing Journal and the state printer 1852-1855. He was elected as a Democrat to the Thirty-fourth Congress, serving from March 4, 1855, to March 3, 1857, representing Michigan's 4th congressional district. He was unsuccessful in seeking reelection in 1856.

As a Freemason, Peck was first active in Detroit Lodge No. 2 (Detroit, Mich.), being therein initiated 11 Feb 1846, passed 25 Feb 1846, and raised 17 Mar 1846. He would then over the years become a member of Lansing Lodge No. 33 (Lansing, Mich.), Brighton Lodge No. 42 (Brighton, Mich.), Capitol Lodge of Strict Observance No. 66 (Lansing, Mich.). He served for two terms as Grand Master of the Grand Lodge of Michigan, first elected on 12 Jan 1854, and then re-elected in Jan 1855.

Peck was elected mayor of Lansing in 1867. He then moved to East Saginaw and engaged in the practice of law until 1873. He moved to St. Louis, Missouri, in 1873, and to Hot Springs, Arkansas, in 1880, and then to Bismarck, Missouri, in 1882. He died in Saginaw, Michigan, and is interred in Brady Hill Cemetery there.

== Sources ==
- United States Congress. "George Washington Peck (id: P000176)". Biographical Directory of the United States Congress.

Political offices
Preceded by Gideon O. Whittemore	Secretary of State of Michigan; 1848–1850	Succeeded by George R. Redfield
U.S. House of Representatives
Preceded by Hestor L. Stevens	United States Representative for the 4th congressional district of Michigan; 1855 – 1857	Succeeded by De Witt C. Leach
