= Zion Lodge No. 1 F&AM =

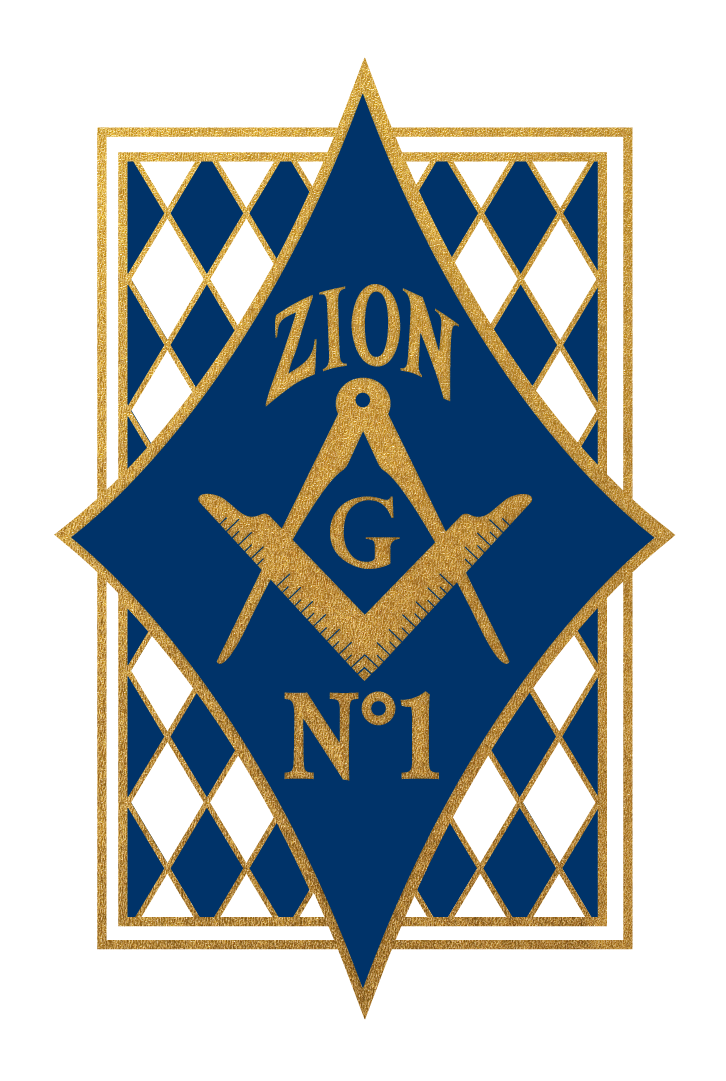
Zion Lodge No. 1 F. & A.M. Zion Lodge No. 1 F&AM logo (2025)
- Established: Friday, April 27, 1764
- Location: United States of America
- Coordinates: 42.3414194°N 83.0601556°W
- Region served: Michigan (District #029)
- Website: Zion Lodge No. 1 F. & A.M.

Zion Lodge No. 1 of Free and Accepted Masons (F. & A.M.), commonly known as Zion No. 1, is a 501c10 Masonic lodge, or Blue Lodge, operating as a Fraternal Society, or Fraternal Beneficiary Societies and Voluntary Employees Associations (Y40), under the jurisdiction of the Grand Lodge of Free and Accepted Masons of the State of Michigan. As a Blue Lodge, or a Craft Lodge or Symbolic Lodge, Zion No. 1 confers the three degrees of Freemasonry, specifically: Entered Apprentice (EA), Fellowcraft (FC), and Master Mason (MM), and provides the necessary foundation and qualification for a Master Mason to join an appendant body (e.g. Scottish Rite, York Rite, Grotto, etc.).

Freemasonry came to the Great Lakes region in the 1700s, with Zion Lodge No. 1 Free and Accepted Masons (F&AM) being the earliest documented Lodge west of the Allegheny Mountains. It began as Lodge No. 1 at Detroit, a Lodge attached to the British 60th Royal American Regiment of Foot in Detroit, and was warranted in Detroit on Friday April 27, 1764, by the Provincial Grand Lodge of New York.

Over its history the lodge has met in many different locations, from a rustic fort blockhouse (1764), to the private residences of Worshipful Master James Donaldson (1794), Bro. James McDonnell (1802), or Bro. John Palmer (1807), and then to Detroit's first purpose built Masonic building (1896) located at First St. and Lafayette Blvd. in Detroit. Since 1926, the Regular Communication meetings are held on the 1st Wednesday Monthly at 7:00 PM (except when dark during July and August), in the Greek Ionic Lodge room, located on the 5th floor Center (5C) of the Ritual Tower in the Detroit Masonic Temple, the world's largest Masonic Temple, at 210 feet tall, 1,037 rooms, and 550,000 sq. feet. Zion Lodge No. 1 has called the Greek Ionic Lodge room, and the Detroit Masonic Temple, home since the temple first opened in 1926. Simply put, “Wednesday Night is Lodge Night,” a truism coined by W. Bro. Bert Brayman (1926-2011) as Wednesday is a night for meetings, perform rituals to confer degrees, or for fellowship at social events or for masonic education at light nights.

Zion Lodge No. 1 as an organization is older than the United States of America (1776), State of Michigan (1837), or Grand Lodge of Free and Accepted Masons of the State of Michigan (1826) that Zion helped to form. As of 2024, Zion Lodge No. 1 founded in 1764 is the second oldest extant institution operating in the City of Detroit (with Detroit founded July 24, 1701), after Basilica of Sainte Anne de Détroit established on July 26, 1701, which itself is the second oldest continuously operating Roman Catholic parish in America.

== History ==
Zion Lodge No. 1 F&AM is the earliest documented Masonic Lodge west of the Allegheny Mountains that was first warranted as ‘Lodge No. 1 at Detroit’ on Friday, April 27, 1764, by George Harison, Provincial Grand Master of the Provincial Grand Lodge of New York, with Lt. John Christie (1740–1782) of the 2nd Battalion, 60th Royal American Foot Regiment as its first Worshipful Master, Sampson Fleming (1757–1791) Commissary of 60th Regiment as Senior Warden, Josias Harper surgeon's mate with the 80th regiment as Junior Warden. Lodge No. 1 at Detroit (later Zion Lodge) held its first meeting "in a blockhouse of Fort Pontchartrain with a gathering of a few civilians and members of the 60th Royal American Foot Regiment." Whether Wardens Fleming and Harper "were soldiers or citizens is not indicated" specifically in the 1764 warrant itself, nor does the warrant contain other language "that gives the lodge, or indicates that it had, a military character." However, "none but 'military men of rank' [were] permitted by English regulations, to be members or officers of a 'military lodge.' "

It has been presented by Masonic historians, like RWM Richard H. Sands in Beyond the Northeast Corner (1998), that ‘Lodge No. 1 at Detroit’ had been renamed ‘Union Lodge No. 1’ sometime in the 1760s, possibly shortly after Lt. Christie relocated from Detroit to Albany, NY, in 1765, where he resided until 1767, but prior to Samuel Fleming’s term serving as Worshipful Master in 1767. At that time Union Lodge No. 1 appears to have operated more as 'local lodge' than a traditional ‘military lodge,’ with a combined military and civilian membership. However, the lodge’s organizational records and documentation between 1764–94, aside from the original 1764 Warrant, are extremely limited and rare, confined to personal correspondence, or other types of unconnected documents, records, or artifacts.

Thirty years later, Zion Lodge No. 10 (now No. 1) was Chartered in 1794 for work in Detroit. It was in this year that "the Detroit Masons first adopted the name Zion Lodge." The next two short-lived lodges established in the territory were also Military Lodges, Harmony Lodge in Detroit (1764-1766) associated with the British 60th Regiment, and St. John's Lodge No. 15 on Mackinac Island (1782-1813) associated with the British 84th Regiment.

The British military surrendered Fort Pontchartrain in July 1796 after the signing of the Jay Treaty. The original Fort Pontchartrain du Détroit was destroyed by fire, along with most of Detroit, in the Great Fire of July 1805. It is possible that this massive fire may also have been responsible for the destruction of Zion Lodge’s early records and documentation.

As the first Masonic lodge in the region, Zion Lodge No. 1 drew its membership from across the region at a time when “many of the members of Zion Lodge prior to 1796 had resided in what is now the Canadian side of the [Detroit] River,” including WM James Donaldson and Bro. Joseph Rowe residing in Amherstburg, Ontario, Canada. As the population grew in the territory and Master Masons proliferated, Zion Lodge No. 1 and its membership “sponsored and supported [other Master Masons in their desire to create] additional Lodges in Upper Canada and Michigan." In Upper Canada “Zion Lodge mothered Lodges at River La Tranche and Amherstburgh.” In Lower Canada, Zion Lodge “encouraged the establishment of a Royal Arch Chapter, Monroe Chapter No. 1, R.A.M. which was organized April 21, 1818.” "In addition [Zion Lodge] supported the founding of other Blue Lodges, including "Detroit Lodge No. 337 (now No. 2), Oakland Lodge No. 343 in Pontiac, Menomonie Lodge No. 374 in Green Bay (then a part of the Territory) and Monroe Lodge No. 375 in Monroe."

In September 1817 "the University of Michigan was assisted in its formation by Zion Lodge and its members" that provided financial support for the newly created university, an action championed by Judge Augustus B. Woodward, Reverend John Monteith, and Father Gabriel Richard. On 15 Sep 1817, Zion Lodge met and subscribed the sum of $250 ($5,905 adjusted value in 2024) in aid of the University of Michigan, payable in the sum of $50 per year. Of the total amount subscribed to start the university, two-thirds came from Zion Lodge and its members.

After 62-years of operating under warrants and charters from Grand Lodges hundreds of miles away, "five Lodges laid plans for a Grand Lodge in the Territory [of Michigan] to handle the growing plans for Masonry in the area." “Eleven delegates representing Zion, Detroit, Menomanie and Monroe Lodges met in a convention in Detroit, convened specifically for the purpose of organizing a Grand Lodge." "On June 24, 1826 the Grand Lodge of Michigan was established in Detroit,” on the Masonic annual celebration of the Feast of St. John the Baptist (similar to the founding of the Premier Grand Lodge of England was founded on June 24, 1717). Zion Lodge was well represented in the Grand Lodge's early leadership, as a majority of the first grand officers elected on July 31, 1826, were Past Masters of Zion, including: Lewis Cass (Grand Master), Andrew G. Whitney (Deputy Grand Master), John L. Whiting (Grand Secretary), Henry J. Hunt (Grand Treasurer), and John E. Schwartz (Grand Pursuivant). A few months later "Lewis Cass, Territorial Governor and Past Grand Master of Ohio, was elected to be [Michigan's] first Grand Master. On December 27, 1826, the Grand Lodge Officers were duly installed by Most Worshipful Brother Lewis Cass, who as a Past Grand Master of Ohio was fully competent to do this work."

Over the course of its 260+ year history, Zion Lodge No. 1 has had to temporarily suspend its operations twice, first during the War of 1812 suspended between 1812 and 1816, and second resulting from the Morgan Affair (1826), during which time Michigan "Grand Master Cass ordered Masons to suspend their meetings in 1829" "during the anti-masonic agitation on 1829–1845, but each time its functions were resumed." Zion grew after over 235-year history prior to the year 2000. The dawn of the new Millennium found Zion composed of five lodges for the first time in its history, by the consolidations of Friendship-Lincoln Lodge No. 417 in 1998, and Phoenicia-Waverly Lodge No. 527 in 1999.

Zion Lodge No. 1's charitable focus is on assistance and relief for its Brothers, Widows, and Orphans, primarily though the Jeremiah Tumey & Grand Lodge Fund, and the Earl Drew Wheelchair Ramp Fund, while also supporting local Detroit community charitable organizations, including: Special Olympics, Forgotten Harvest, Autism And Us, and Sacred Heart Church.

Zion Lodge No. 1's provides relief to its membership via the Jeremiah Tumey & Grand Lodge Fund 501(c)(3), used to issue grants to its distressed brothers, widows and orphans, and support the scholarship of its members children attending university or community college. The fund, originally created in 1947 (with IRS ruling year of 1963), is named for its grantor, Bro. Jeremiah Tumey (1863–1944), who worked as a farmer, carpenter, and builder, and was a member of Friendship Lodge No. 417 (consolidated into Zion Lodge No. 1 in 1998).

Zion Lodge No. 1's Earl Drew Wheelchair Ramp Fund provides funding and volunteer manpower from Zion Lodge No. 1, Aries Grotto, and the selfless and charitable members from other lodges including Unity Lodge No. 28 Prince Hall Affiliated (PHA), for building wheelchair ramps "for the physically disadvantaged to facilitate their entry/exit from their residences" within the Metro Detroit area. This program is named after Bro. Earl K. Drew (1914–2000), who was a member of Phoenicia Lodge No. 531 (consolidated into Zion Lodge No. 1 in 1999) and Aries Grotto MOVPER. The program began ca. 1974 "with a simple act of kindness by one man when his friend lost full use of his foot following surgery, and was in need of help entering and exiting his home. This one act lead to requests for help by others, and thus the Earl Drew program was born and continues to this day," building over 250 ramps since 1974.

Zion Lodge No. 1 provides Masonic Funeral Service and Graveside Burial Rituals for its Master Mason members in good standing, carried out at the request of a Master Mason or his family. The dignified and solemn ceremony is meant to honor the life and legacy of its membership, and provide "comfort and solace" to those mourning. It is one of the few Masonic ceremonies that are performed publicly.

In mid-February, the month that celebrates US President George Washington's Birthday, Zion Lodge No. 1 holds the WB George Washington Ceremony in front of the 'George Washington as Master Mason' statue created by American sculptor Donald De Lue (1897–1988), which was "presented to the city of Detroit by the Grand Lodge Free and Accepted Masons of Michigan May 21, 1966 in Commemoration of Ten Centuries of Freemasonry," where the statue is located just outside of the historic Mariners' Church of Detroit. The wreath laying ceremony honors "Brother President Washington and his Masonic legacy," and has been an annual event celebrated by Zion Lodge No. 1 since February 2008.

== Charters ==
Over its 260+ year history, Zion Lodge has operated under different names and lodge numbers, seven charters/warrants, and five jurisdictions.

List of charters related to Zion Lodge No. 1 F&AM.

Warrant / Charter Number	Lodge Name & Number	Charter Warrant Year(s)	Charter Warrant Date	Jurisdiction
1	Lodge No. 1 at Detroit	1764–1794	1764 Apr 27	Grand Lodge of England by Provincial Grand Lodge of New York
2	Zion Lodge No. 10 (renumbered)	1794–1806	1794 Sep 07	Provincial Grand Lodge of Lower Canada at Quebec
3	Zion Lodge No. 1 at Detroit	1806–1812	1806 Sep 03	Grand Lodge of New York
NA	Suspended Activities	1812–1816	NA	War of 1812
4a	Zion Lodge No. 62 (renumbered)	1816–1819	1816 Apr 15	Grand Lodge of New York
4b	Zion Lodge No. 3 (renumbered)	1819–1826	1819 Jun 04	Grand Lodge of New York
5	Zion Lodge No. 1	1826–1829	1826 Jun 24	Grand Lodge Territory of Michigan
NA	Suspended Activities	1829–1844	NA	Anti-Masonic Period
6	Zion Lodge No. 99 (renumbered)	1844–1845	1844 Jun 13	Grand Lodge of New York
7	Zion Lodge No. 1	1845–present	1845 Jun 05	Grand Lodge of Michigan

== Lodge Locations ==
List of lodge locations of Zion Lodge No. 1 F&AM.

Years	Location	Address
1764–1783	Fort Pontchartrain du Détroit (aka Fort Detroit)	Larned St., Griswold St., Washington Blvd., and the Civic Center
1783-1880	New Hall	174-178 Griswold St. and State St.
1794	Private Residence of James Donaldson	Unknown
1802	Private Residence of James McDonnell	Unknown
1804-1805	Dodemeade House (Tavern of Br. John Dodemeade)	Ste. Anne St. (or Jefferson Ave. and Shelby St.)
1807	Private Residence of John Palmer	Unknown
1817-1818	Steamboat Hotel (Benjamin Woodworth)	Woodbridge and Randolph St.
1823-1842	Old Council House	Randolph St. and Jefferson Ave.
1842-1852	Detroit Encampment (Newberry Building)	Cass St. and Jefferson Ave.
1852-1881	Masonic Hall	131-135 Jefferson Ave.
1881-1882	Hilsendegen Hall	52-69 Monroe Ave. and Randolph St.
1882-1883	Kermott's Hall	208 Woodward Ave. and Wilcox Ave.
1884-1887	Masonic Hall	263-265 Michigan Ave.
1887-1894	Scottish Rite Cathedral	99 Lafayette Ave., between Cass Ave. and First St.
1894-1895	Philharmonic Hall	42 Lafayette Blvd.
1895-1926	Masonic Temple	Lafayette Blvd. and First St.
1926–Present	Detroit Masonic Temple	434, 450, 500 Temple St.

== Past Masters, 1764-2000 ==
List of past masters of Zion Lodge No. 1 F&AM (1764-2000).

Year	Past Master	Life Dates	Occupation
1764	Christie, Lieut. John	1740-1872	Military; British soldier;
1765	Unknown	????-????	Unknown
1766	Unknown	????-????	Unknown
1767	Fleming, Sampson	1757-1791	Military; British commissary;
1768	Unknown	????-????	Unknown
1769	Unknown	????-????	Unknown
1770	Unknown	????-????	Unknown
1771	Unknown	????-????	Unknown
1772	Unknown	????-????	Unknown
1773	Unknown	????-????	Unknown
1774	Unknown	????-????	Unknown
1775	Unknown	????-????	Unknown
1776	Unknown	????-????	Unknown
1777	Unknown	????-????	Unknown
1778	Unknown	????-????	Unknown
1779	Unknown	????-????	Unknown
1780	Unknown	????-????	Unknown
1781	Unknown	????-????	Unknown
1782	Williams, Thomas	1744-1785	Merchant; Fur Trader;
1783	Unknown	????-????	Unknown
1784	Unknown	????-????	Unknown
1785	Unknown	????-????	Unknown
1786	Unknown	????-????	Unknown
1787	Unknown	????-????	Unknown
1788	Unknown	????-????	Unknown
1789	Unknown	????-????	Unknown
1790	Unknown	????-????	Unknown
1791	Unknown	????-????	Unknown
1792	Unknown	????-????	Unknown
1793	Unknown	????-????	Unknown
1794	Donaldson, James	????-1801	Military; Businessman; Tavern keeper; Inn keeper;
1795	Donaldson, James	????-1801	Military; Businessman; Tavern keeper; Inn keeper;
1796	May, James Louis	1756-1829	Merchant; Chief Justice, Court of Common Pleas;
1797	May, James Louis	1756-1829	Merchant; Chief Justice, Court of Common Pleas;
1798	Heward, Hugh	????-1803	British fur trader;
1798	Donaldson, James	????-1801	Military; Businessman; Tavern keeper; Inn keeper;
1799	Donaldson, James	????-1801	Military; Businessman; Tavern keeper; Inn keeper;
1800	Heward, Hugh	????-1803	British fur trader;
1801	McDonnell, James	????-????	Unknown
1802	Scott, Dr. William McDowell	1782-1816	Medical; Justice, Court of Common Pleas;
1803	Scott, Dr. William McDowell	1782-1816	Medical; Justice, Court of Common Pleas;
1803	Abbott, Robert	1770-1852	Politician;
1804	Abbott, Robert	1770-1852	Politician;
1804	Dodemeade, John (Master pro tem)	????-1812	Businessman; Tavern keeper; Politician; Trustee of Detroit;
1804	Scott, Dr. William McDowell	1782-1816	Medical; Justice, Court of Common Pleas;
1805	Smyth, Richard	1784-1836	Tavern keeper; Justice of the Peace;
1805	Abbott, Robert	1770-1852	Politician;
1806	Tuttle, Christopher	????-1811	Military;
1806	Abbott, James	1776-1858	Politician; Trustee of Detroit;
1807	Abbott, James	1776-1858	Politician; Trustee of Detroit;
1808	Abbott, James	1776-1858	Politician; Trustee of Detroit;
1809	Scott, Dr. William McDowell	1782-1816	Medical; Justice, Court of Common Pleas;
1810	Day, Dr. Sylvester	1778-1851	Medical; Military; US Army surgeon;
1811	Day, Dr. Sylvester	1778-1851	Medical; Military; US Army surgeon;
1811	Eastman, Capt. Jonathan	1772-1836	Military;
1812	Eastman, Capt. Jonathan	1772-1836	Military;
1813-1815	Suspended Activities	NA	War of 1812
1816	Day, Dr. Sylvester	1778-1851	Medical; Military; US Army surgeon;
1817	Day, Dr. Sylvester	1778-1851	Medical; Military; US Army surgeon;
1818	Macomb, Gen. Alexander	1782-1841	Military;
1819	Whitney, Andrew Griswold	1786-1826	Politician; Mayor;
1820	Whitney, Andrew Griswold	1786-1826	Politician; Mayor;
1821	Wing, Austin Eli	1792-1849	Politician;
1822	Wing, Austin Eli	1792-1850	Politician;
1823	Wing, Austin Eli	1792-1851	Politician;
1824	Whiting, Dr. John Leffingwell	1793-1880	Medical; Politician;
1825	Waite, Obed	1766-1845	Architect;
1826	Hunt, Henry Jackson	1786-1826	Mayor of Detroit; Politician; Businessman;
1827	Gray, Elliott	1795-1839	Treasurer of Wayne County; Businessman;
1828	Schwartz, John E.	????-1854	Military; Adjutant-General;
1829	Dean, Henry	????-????	Unknown
1830-1843	Suspended Activities	NA	Anti-Masonic Period
1844	Schwartz, John E.	????-1854	Adjutant-General; Military;
1845	Thompson, David	1802-1864	Politician; Commissioner; Alderman;
1845	Williams, Ezra	1790-1861	Politician; Justice of Peace;
1846	Forsythe, Robert A.	1798-1849	Military;
1847	Williams, Alpheus Starkey	1810-1878	Military; Lawyer; Politician;
1848	Lister, William M.	1811-1887	Bookkeeper;
1849	Abbott, John S.	1815-1866	Lawyer;
1850	Pettys, Daniel C.	1805-1883	Farmer;
1851	Pettys, Daniel C.	1805-1883	Farmer;
1852	Davis, George	????-????	Unknown
1852	Lovett, John	????-????	Unknown
1853	Anderson, Daniel	1823-1888	Rail transportation;
1854	Brodie, Dr. William	1823-1890	Medical; Education; Founder Detroit Medical Society;
1855	Brodie, Dr. William	1823-1890	Medical; Education; Founder Detroit Medical Society;
1856	Anderson, Daniel	1823-1888	Rail transportation;
1857	Anderson, Daniel	1823-1888	Rail transportation;
1858	Batwell, Dr. Edward	1828-1899	Medical;
1859	Gorton, Dr. John C.	1806-1864	Medical; Politician;
1860	Anderson, Daniel	1823-1888	Rail transportation;
1861	Young, Charles M.	????-????	Businessman; Young & Benster;
1862	Morrow, Gen. Henry Andrew	1829-1891	Judge; Politician; Military; General;
1863	Noble, Garra B.	1816-1897	Businessman;
1864	Allen, Elbridge G.	????-1884	Businessman; Lumber;
1865	Allen, Elbridge G.	????-1884	Businessman; Lumber;
1866	Johnson, Hugh	1832-1903	Businessman; Carriage Manufacturer;
1867	McGregor, Thomas	1828-1903	Businessman; Boiler Manufacturer;
1868	McGregor, Thomas	1828-1903	Businessman; Boiler Manufacturer;
1869	Brow, Andrew James	1830-1905	Businessman; Art supplier; Dean, Brow & Godfrey;
1870	Brow, Andrew James	1830-1905	Businessman; Art supplier; Dean, Brow & Godfrey;
1871	Hosie, Alexander	????-????	Clerk; Notary Public;
1872	Hosie, Alexander	????-????	Clerk; Notary Public;
1873	Lewis, John L.	1844-1927	Military; Accountant;
1874	Lewis, John L.	1844-1927	Military; Accountant;
1875	Lewis, John L.	1844-1927	Military; Accountant;
1876	Lewis, John L.	1844-1927	Military; Accountant;
1877	Hawes Sr., Frederick William	1844-1894	Rail transportation;
1878	Hawes Sr., Frederick William	1844-1894	Rail transportation;
1879	Vaughn, Frank B.	1846-1908	Businessman; Roofing contractor;
1880	Vaughn, Frank B.	1846-1908	Businessman; Roofing contractor;
1881	Johnson, Hugh	1832-1903	Businessman; Carriage Manufacturer;
1882	Johnson, Hugh	1832-1903	Businessman; Carriage Manufacturer;
1883	Rooks, Alfred W.	1847-1898	Rail transportation;
1884	Austin, Richard R.	1838-1924	D. M. Ferry & Co.;
1885	Ormerod, Jonathan W.	1836-1889	Carpenter; Rail transportation;
1886	Burton, Capt. James Covel	1830-1915	Insurance Industry; Marine;
1887	Brown, Ross	1844-1925	Insurance Industry;
1888	Brown, Ross	1844-1925	Insurance Industry;
1889	Purdie, James	????-????	Unknown
1890	Purdie, James	????-????	Unknown
1891	Cartwright, John Henry	1847-1907	Granite Industry; Astronomer;
1892	Goudie, George H.	1851-1925	Merchant;
1893	Waterfall, Edward A.	1862-1922	Insurance Industry;
1894	Smith, Simeon	1862-1921	Steel Industry;
1895	Dresser, Julius Alanson	1849-1923	Civil engineer; Accounting;
1896	Shaw, George Russell	1850-1926	Attorney;
1897	Ross, Delmar C.	1858-1938	Rail transportation;
1898	Drywood, George Thomas	1859-1931	Tool maker;
1899	Pool, Jay Foster	1869-1955	Dentist;
1900	Murray, Robert H.	1853-1942	Real Estate; Singer;
1901	Williamson, Harry P.	1861-1927	Episcopal Choirmaster;
1902	Bourke, Percy E.	1867-1926	Vessel Traffic;
1903	Choate, Ward Nelson	1873-1939	Attorney;
1904	Kretzschmar, Louis J.	1856-1929	Grocer;
1905	Twiggs, Templeton P.	1858-1944	Education; Professor;
1906	Murray, William J.	1867-1940	Cartage Industry;
1907	McIntyre, Frank D.	????-????	Rail transportation;
1908	Pigott, James A.	1863-1925	Insurance Industry;
1909	McInnes, John C.	1869-1939	Civil Employee;
1910	Lomason, Harry A.	1869-1950	Industrialist;
1911	Schaffer, Frederick J.	1871-1937	Financial Brokerage;
1912	Turner, Carroll Howard	1871-1926	Businessman; Printing Industry;
1913	Barkaw, George R.	1869-1961	Education;
1914	Held, Otto Gottfried Carl	1873-1942	Confectioner;
1915	Parkinson, David A.	1876-1958	Advertising; Artist; Draftsman;
1916	Schaffer, Frederick J.	1871-1937	Financial Brokerage;
1917	Morgan, Sherman H.	1867-1937	Businessman; Plumbing-Heating-Cooling;
1918	Fry, Frederick Alanson	1876-1963	Carpenter; Restaurateur;
1919	Howes, Bert L.	1872-1962	Wholesaler;
1920	Bohnsack, George C.	1876-1952	Oil Industry;
1921	McGregor, Harold C.	1890-1954	Businessman; Boiler Manufacturer;
1922	Hawes Jr., Frederick William	1868-1938	Automotive Engineer;
1923	Valade, Malcolm G.	1880-1942	Salesman;
1924	Smith, Herbert Lee	1873-1955	Insurance Industry;
1925	Leadbetter, Thomas D.	1889-1991	Politician; City Clerk;
1926	Cotney, George E.	1880-1951	Officer; Gas Industry;
1927	Barry, Stanley M.	1892-1962	Cashier; Treasurer;
1928	Campbell, James Gilbert	1871-1941	Druggist;
1929	Clunis, George William	1874-1944	Undertaker; Funeral Industry;
1930	Upright, William Seward	1895-1965	Salesman;
1931	Lamb, Edward Mills	1863-1940	Businessman; Toothpick Industry;
1932	Bryant, William Richard	1868-1940	Cartage Industry; Inspector (Street Railway); Rail transportation;
1933	Teagan, Avery Edward	1895-1958	Salesman; Tire & Rubber Industry;
1934	Metting, Edwin G.	1897-1965	Banking Industry;
1935	Blanchard, Oliver Alexander	1877-1945	Cartage Industry;
1936	Daniels, Joseph	1891-1953	Businessman; Retail Automotive Fuels;
1937	Stewart, Earl Vaughn	1887-1959	Lawyer;
1938	Patrick, Theodore Raymond	1904-1963	Automotive Industry;
1939	Klages, Charles P.	1884-1956	Rail transportation; Manager (Street Railway);
1940	Moore, Robert Ernest	1891-1964	Law Enforcement; Sheriff's Identification Bureau;
1941	Campbell, Argyll Esterling	1906-1960	Lawyer;
1942	Chapel, Harold Raymond	1899-1984	Banking Industry;
1943	Bohnsack, Earl Hazelton	1907-1959	Oil Industry;
1944	DeHart, Thomas Edwin	1870-1956	Insurance Industry;
1945	Eggers, Charles A.	1885-1952	Construction Industry; Electric Utility Industry;
1946	Cotney, Russell Westley	1906-1989	Accounting;
1947	Piggins, Edward Stuart	1906-1972	Judge;
1948	Tandy, Murray Reid	1905-1985	Gas Industry;
1949	Blasberg, Emil Walter	1893-1953	Barber Supplies; Cutlery;
1950	Ellesin, Daniel Stephen	1906-1984	Education;
1951	Sessions, William Vyne	1896-1963	Education; Chemistry;
1952	Cornforth, Edward John	1895-1965	Electric Utility Industry;
1953	Clunis, William George	1903-1981	Undertaker; Funeral Industry;
1954	Stuart, Roy Franklin	1900-1977	Newspaper Industry;
1955	Schroeder, Gerald Clarence	1917-1995	Accountant; Businessman;
1956	Valrance, Keith Lavern	1908-1994	Gas Utility; Engineer;
1957	Piggins, Frederick Ford	1913-1989	Attorney;
1958	Hart, John Richard	1876-????	Businessman; Machinist;
1959	Simpson, Thomas Irvine	1911-1992	Accountant; Automotive Industry;
1960	Hadden, George Ross	1904-1982	Tobacco Industry;
1961	Smith, Clarence N.	1905-1973	Social Worker;
1962	Schneider, Don L.	1912-2008	Insurance;
1963	Copeland, John Luke	1925-1983	Banking Industry;
1964	Baldwin, Stanley John	1904-1994	Public Utility;
1965	Moore, Joseph Roy	1918-1996	Sign Industry;
1966	Porter, Elton L.	1904-1992	Lawyer;
1967	Lyness, Maurice Clyde	1911-1991	Shipping;
1968	Kulchar, Alexander	1914-1975	Machinist;
1969	Calvillo, Jose De Jesus	1912-1982	Advertising; Artist;
1970	Lloyd, Richard S.	1913-1998	Commercial Art; Photographer;
1971	Schofield, Arthur	1915-2002	Unknown
1972	Living	Living	Unknown
1973	Babis, August John	1910-1999	Unknown
1974	Lloyd, Peter S.	1945-1981	Unknown
1975	Moore, Joseph Robb	1948-2026	Sign Industry;
1976	Living	Living	Unknown
1977	Living	Living	Unknown
1978	Living	Living	Unknown
1979	Miller, Winston W.	1924-2003	Unknown
1980	Zeder, James Mills	1941-2025	Unknown
1981	Living	Living	Unknown
1982	Brant, Robert Elgin	1931-1984	Unknown
1983	Miller, Winston W.	1924-2003	Unknown
1984	Gallu, Samuel	1934-2007	Unknown
1985	Jackson, Roger Norman	1931-1991	Unknown
1986	Jackson, Roger Norman	1931-1991	Unknown
1987	Living	Living	Unknown
1988	Gould, William Denis	1923-1995	Unknown
1989	Williams, Charles P.	1926-2000	Unknown
1990	Milotz, Eugene H.	1925-2020	Automotive Industry;
1991	Williams, James Clark	1931-1993	Military; Supply Specialist;
1992	Living	Living	Unknown
1993	Thompson, Edwin Bruce	1928-1999	Unknown
1994	Living	Living	Unknown
1995	Living	Living	Unknown
1996	Thompson, Edwin Bruce	1928-1999	Unknown
1997	Living	Living	Unknown
1998	Living	Living	Unknown
1999	Living	Living	Unknown
2000	Living	Living	Unknown

== Notable Members ==
List of notable members, and honorary members (*), of Zion Lodge No. 1 F&AM.

Decade Active	Name	Life Dates	Occupation
1810	Cass, Gen. Lewis	1782–1866	Governor of Michigan Territory
1950	DeLorean, John Zachary	1925–2005	Automobile Businessman
1910	Deutsch, Adolph	1881–1968	Banker
1940	Gilmore, Horace Weldon	1918–2010	US District Judge
1900	Heineman, David Emil	1865–1935	Politician; Designer of City of Detroit Flag
1810	Macomb Jr., Gen. Alexander	1782–1841	Military; General
1900	Palmer, Thomas Witherell	1830–1913	US Senator
1950	Poling, Harold Arthur	1925–2012	Automobile Businessman
1810	Sibley, Solomon	1769–1846	First Mayor of Detroit
1840	Williams, Gen. Alpheus Starkey	1810–1878	Union General; US Congressman
1810	Woodward, Augustus B.	1774–1827	First Chief Justice of Michigan Territory
1920	*Ford, Henry	1863–1947	Automobile Businessman
1930	*Fead, Louis H.	1877–1943	Justice, Mich. Supreme Court
1930	*Ruthven, Dr. Alexander Grant	1882–1971	Professor; President, Univ. of Mich.
2023	*Walker, Bernt C.	1971–Living	62nd MWGM (2023), MWPHGL of Michigan;

== Notable Members Street Names ==
List of famous members of Zion Lodge No. 1 F&AM who have had streets named after them (A-W).

Street	Name	Life Dates	Occupation
Abbott St.	Abbott, Robert, [or James Abbott (1776-1858)]	1770 -1852	Fur trader; Politician;
Askin St.	Askin (Erskine) family, John Sr. and John Jr.;	N/A	British fur trade; Businessmen;
Bates St.	Bates, Frederick	1777–1825	Attorney; Politician; Postmaster;
Brush St.	Brush, Capt. Elijah	1773–1813	Commander; Lawyer; Mayor;
Brevoort Pl.	Brevoort, Capt. Henry Bregaw	1775–1858	Military; Silver Star Metal;
Campeau St.	Campeau, Joseph	1769–1863	Businessman; Real Estate;
Canfield Ave.	Canfield, Maj. Augustus	1854–1932	Military;
Caniff Ave.	Caniff, Abraham C.	1791–1876	Judge;
Cass Ave.	Cass, Gen. Lewis	1782–1866	Military; Politician; Governor;
Conant Ave.	Conant, Harry Armitage	1844–1925	Politician;
Cook St.	Cook, Levi	1792–1866	Businessman; Mayor;
Davenport Ave.	Davenport, Samuel T.	1790-1821	Attorney;
Erskine St.	Erskine (Askin) family, John Sr. and John Jr.;	N/A	British fur trade; Businessmen
Farmer St.	Farmer, John	1798-1859	Education; Cartographer;
Forsyth St.	Forsyth, Robert A.	1798-1849	Military;
Harvey St.	Harvey, John	1835-1905	Businessman; Baker;
Henry St.	Sibley, Henry Hastings	1811-1891	Son of Solomon Sibley; Businessman; Fur trader; Politician;
Howard St.	Howard, Leuit. Joshua A.	1793-1868	Military;
Hunt St.	Hunt, Henry Jackson	1819-1889	Politician; Mayor;
Jones St.	Jones, De Garmo	1787-1846	Military; Politician; Mayor;
Kercheval St.	Kercheval, Benjamin Berry	1793-1855	Businessman; Banker; Politician; Senate;
Kirby Ave.	Kirby, Donald M.	????-????	Unknown;
Leib St.	Lieb, John Lewis	1760-1838	Politician; Chief Justice Detroit;
Macomb St.	Macomb, Gen. Alexander	1782-1841	Military;
May St.	May, James	1800-1806	Military; Politician;
McDougall Ave.	McDougall, George	1806-1818	Military; Lawyer;
Meldrum Ave.	Meldrum, George	1737-1817	Military; Original Detroit Trustee; Coroner; Businessman; Philanthropist
Meldrum Ct.	Meldrum, George	1737-1817	Military; Original Detroit Trustee; Coroner; Businessman; Philanthropist
Palmer Ave.	Palmer, John	1796-1871	Businessman;
Piquette St.	Piquette, Jean Baptiste	1809-1851	Silversmith; Jeweler;
Sibley St.	Sibley, Solomon	1769-1846	Lawyer; Politician; Mayor;
Sproat St.	Sproat-Sibley, Sarah Whipple	1782-1851	Wife of Solomon Sibley;
Strong Ave.	Strong, Col. David	1744-1801	Military;
Temple St.	N/A	1920	Detroit Masonic Temple;
Tumey Ave.	Tumey, Jeremiah	1863–1944	Farmer; Carpenter;
Visger Ave.	Visger, Jacobus	1770-1823	Businessman; Judge;
Visger St.	Visger, Jacobus	1770-1823	Businessman; Judge;
Whitney Ave.	Whitney, Andrew Griswold	1786-1826	Politician; Mayor;
Witherell St.	Witherell, James	1759-1838	Justice; Military;
Woodward Ave.	Woodward, Judge Augustus Brevoort	1774-1827	Chief Justice Michigan Territory;

== Associated Historical Markers and Monuments ==
List of Historical Markers related to Zion Lodge No. 1 F&AM.

- Lewis Cass, Michigan Governor, General, and first Grand Master of the Grand Lodge of Michigan, in Cassopolis, MI.
- John Christie, first Worshipful Master of Lodge No. 1 at Detroit in 1764 (later Zion Lodge No. 1), in Charleston, SC.
- Alexander Macomb, General, and Worshipful Master of Zion Lodge in 1818, in Detroit, MI.
- George Washington as Master Mason, a sculpture in Detroit that depicts George Washington as the Worshipful Master of Alexandria Lodge No. 22 (1788-1805) in Alexandria, Virginia, in 1788, the year that he was elected President of the United States.
- Zion Lodge No. 1, F. and A. M., the earliest documented Masonic Lodge west of the Allegheny Mountains established in 1764, in Detroit, MI.

== Lodge Consolidations ==
Lodge consolidations into Zion Lodge No. 1 F&AM.

- Friendship Lodge No. 417 (1897-1998)
- Lincoln Lodge No. 504 (1921-1988)
- Waverly Lodge No. 527 (1923-1999)
- Phoenicia Lodge No. 531 (1924-1984)

Friendship #417 was Chartered on January 27 1897.

Lincoln #504 was Chartered on May 21 1921 and consolidated into Friendship #417 on June 20 1988, to form Friendship-Lincoln #417.

Waverly #527 was Chartered on May 23 1923.

Phoenicia #531 was Chartered on May 28 1924 and consolidated into Waverly #527 on November 29 1984, to form Phoenicia-Waverly #527.

Friendship-Lincoln #417 consolidated into Zion #1 on July 24 1998, to form Zion #1.

Phoenicia-Waverly #527 consolidated into Zion #1 on February 11 1999, to form Zion #1.

== Selected Bibliography ==
Burton, Clarence Monroe. Zion Lodge, A.F. & A.M. (Detroit) 1794-1829. An Account of its Members and Visitors with an Historical Introduction. Detroit: 1929. Detroit Public Library, Burton Historical Collection (74D4 366.1 Z6MB). Available: https://search.worldcat.org/title/23305393

Great Lakes Masonic Conclave Historical Souvenir 1764–2014. Detroit : Zion Lodge No.1 F. & A.M., 2014.

Historical Souvenir 1764–1904: Issued in Commemoration of the One Hundred and Fortieth Anniversary of Zion Lodge Number One, F. & A. M., Detroit Michigan, April the Twenty-Seventh, in the Year Nineteen Hundred and Four. Detroit : Zion Lodge No.1 F. & A.M., 1904. Detroit Public Library, Burton Historical Collection (74DA 366.1 Z6H c.2). Available: https://search.worldcat.org/en/title/42730405

Morang, GN. Hunting for manuscripts. 1901. Available: https://dr.library.brocku.ca/bitstream/handle/10464/4848/huntingformanuscripts1901.pdf?sequence=1&isAllowed=y

Nichols, Kevin H., "Frontier Freemasons: Masonic Networks Linking The Great Lakes To The Atlantic World, 1750–1820" (2020). Wayne State University Dissertations. 2500. https://digitalcommons.wayne.edu/oa_dissertations/2500

One Hundred Fiftieth Anniversary: Zion Lodge No. 1 F. & A. M. 1764–1914. Chartered April 27, 1764. [Detroit?, 1914]. Available: https://babel.hathitrust.org/cgi/pt?id=mdp.39015024478466&seq=1

Smith, J. Fairbairn and Fey, Charles. History of Freemasonry in Michigan (Vol. 1). Most Worshipful Grand Lodge Free and Accepted Mason of Michigan, Michigan, 1963. Available: https://babel.hathitrust.org/cgi/pt?id=mdp.39015071414471&seq=1

Smith, James Fairbairn. Masonic Temple, Detroit, Michigan: Romantic Development of the Meeting Place of Detroit Freemasons from Rugged Block House in 1764 to Largest and Most Beautiful Masonic Temple in the Entire World. Detroit: s. n., 194-?. Available: https://babel.hathitrust.org/cgi/pt?id=mdp.39015071313293&seq=7

Smith, James Fairbairn. U.S.A. Bicentennial 1776-1976 Presenting Graphic View of Michigan Masonic Tracing Board 1764-1976 - Sesquicentennial of the Grand Lodge Free and Accepted Masons of Michigan Featuring A Panorama of Masonic History. Sesquicentennial Commission, Michigan Grand Lodge of Free and Accepted Masons, [Detroit?], [1976?]. Available: https://catalog.hathitrust.org/Record/004400124 Available: https://search.worldcat.org/title/756432419?oclcNum=756432419

State of Michigan Masonic Grand Lodge Proceedings. George Washington Masonic Memorial Collections, 2024. Available: http://gwm.lunaimaging.com/luna/servlet/GWM~35~35

Zion Lodge No. 1 F. & A.M. Past Master's Night, February 21, 1912. Detroit : Wm. Graham Printing Co., 1912; p. 10. Available: https://detroithistorical.pastperfectonline.com/archive/2C35D31E-621D-478C-BFAD-196069006841

Zion Lodge No. 1 Minutes of Meetings, Dec. 19, 1794 – Mar. 2, 1829. 5 Volumes; Detroit Public Library, Burton Historical Collection (74D4 366.1 Z6H6); Minutes Zion Lodge No 10. Detroit Upper Canada 1794-1801. 5 Volumes; Grand Lodge of A.F. & A.M. of Canada Library and Archives, Hamilton, ON (M17.971 Z53h). Available: https://search.worldcat.org/title/23304540

Zion Lodge Number One is Celebrating its Two Hundredth Anniversary from Seventeen Sixty Four to Nineteen Sixty Four. Detroit, Mich.: Zion Lodge No. 1, 1964. Available: https://detp.ent.sirsi.net/client/en_US/default/search/detailnonmodal/ent:$002f$002fSD_ILS$002f0$002fSD_ILS:1419904/one Available: https://detroithistorical.pastperfectonline.com/archive/8618911F-3A7A-4949-B2E4-187904079290
