= Augustus C. Baldwin =

American politician (1817–1903)

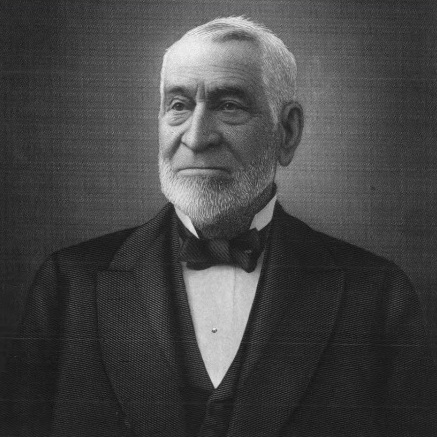
- Picture of Baldwin, from 1897's Bench and Bar of Michigan

Member of the U.S. House of Representatives from Michigan's 5th district
- In office March 4, 1863 – March 3, 1865
- Succeeded by: Rowland E. Trowbridge

Personal details
- Born: December 24, 1817 Salina, New York
- Died: January 21, 1903 (aged 85) Pontiac, Michigan
- Party: Democratic
- Profession: Lawyer

Augustus Carpenter Baldwin (December 24, 1817 – January 21, 1903) was a politician from the U.S. state of Michigan.

Baldwin was born in Salina (now Syracuse, New York) and attended the public schools. He moved to Oakland County, Michigan, in 1837 and taught school. He studied law, was admitted to the bar in 1842 and commenced practice in Milford, Michigan. He was a member of the Michigan State House of Representatives 1844–1846, serving as Speaker in 1846.

He moved to Pontiac, Michigan, in March 1849 and was prosecuting attorney for Oakland County in 1853 and 1854. He was a delegate to the 1860 Democratic National Conventions at Charleston and Baltimore.

Baldwin was elected as a Democrat to the United States House of Representatives for the 38th Congress, serving from March 4, 1863, to March 3, 1865, becoming the first person to represent Michigan's 5th congressional district. He was one of 14 House Democrats to vote in favor of the Thirteenth Amendment to the United States Constitution. He unsuccessfully contested the election of Rowland E. Trowbridge to the 39th Congress. He was a delegate to 1864 Democratic National Convention in Chicago, and to the 1866 National Union Convention at Philadelphia.

He was a member of the Pontiac School Board, 1868–1886, mayor of Pontiac in 1874, judge of the sixth judicial circuit court of Michigan from 1875 until April 15, 1880, when he resigned and resumed the practice of law. He was a member of the board of trustees of the Eastern Michigan Asylum.

Baldwin died in Pontiac, aged 85, and was interred in Oak Hill Cemetery there.

U.S. House of Representatives
Preceded by None	United States Representative for the 5th Congressional District of Michigan; 1863 – 1865	Succeeded by Rowland E. Trowbridge
