= Francis William Kellogg =

American politician (1810–1879)

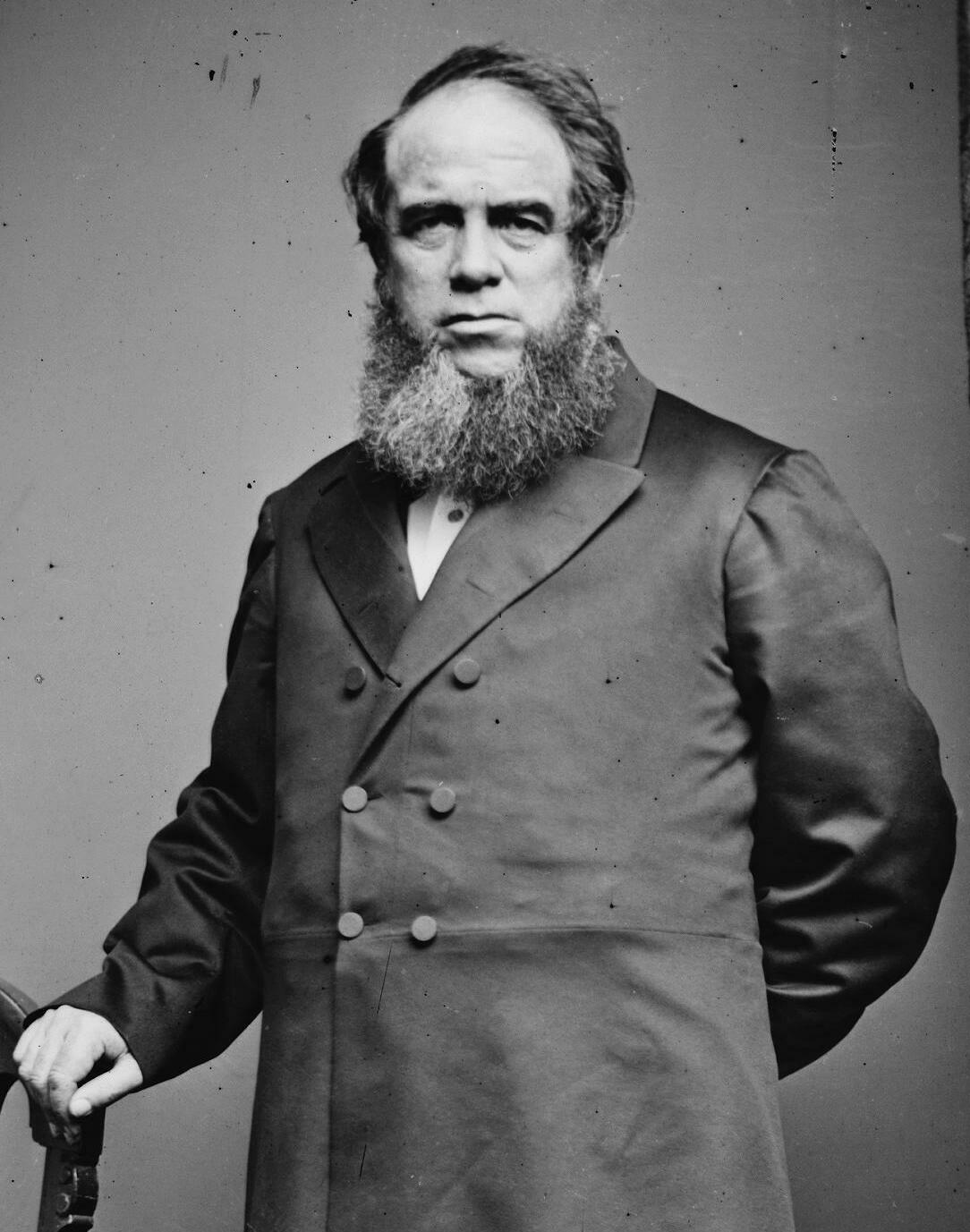

Member of the U.S. House of Representatives from Alabama's 1st district
- In office July 22, 1868 – March 3, 1869
- Preceded by: James Adams Stallworth
- Succeeded by: Alfred Buck

Member of the U.S. House of Representatives from Michigan
- In office March 4, 1859 – March 3, 1865
- Preceded by: David S. Walbridge
- Succeeded by: Thomas W. Ferry
- Constituency: 3rd district (1859–1863); 4th district (1863–1865)

Member of the Michigan House of Representatives from the Kent County 2nd district
- In office 1857–1858
- Preceded by: Smith Lapham
- Succeeded by: Silas S. Fallass

Personal details
- Born: May 30, 1810 Worthington, Massachusetts
- Died: January 13, 1879 (aged 68) Alliance, Ohio
- Party: Republican

Military service
- Branch/service: Union Army
- Rank: Colonel
- Battles/wars: American Civil War

Francis William Kellogg (May 30, 1810 – January 13, 1879) was a U.S. representative from the states of Michigan, on the eve of and during the Civil War, and Alabama, during Reconstruction.

== Biography ==
Kellogg was born in Worthington, Massachusetts and attended the common schools. He moved to Columbus, Ohio, in 1833 and then to Grand Rapids, Michigan, in 1855 where he engaged in the lumber business with the firm Kellogg, White & Co. at Kelloggville (which was named after him) in Kent County, Michigan. He was a member of the Michigan State House of Representatives, where he represented the Kent County 2nd district, from 1857 to 1858.

Kellogg was elected from Michigan as a Republican to United States House of Representatives for the 36th, 37th, and 38th Congresses, serving from March 4, 1859 to March 3, 1865. He represented Michigan's 3rd congressional district for his first two terms, then the 4th district after a redistricting. In all three contests, he defeated the former mayor of Grand Rapids, Thomas B. Church, in the general election. During the American Civil War, he organized the Second, Third, and Sixth Cavalry Regiments by the authority of the United States Department of War. He was appointed as the colonel of the Third Michigan Cavalry.

During Reconstruction, he was appointed by U.S. President Andrew Johnson as collector of internal revenue for the southern district of Alabama on April 30, 1866, and served until July 1868, residing in Mobile, Alabama.

Upon the re-admission of Alabama to the Union, Kellogg was elected to a partial term in Alabama's 1st congressional district to the 40th Congress, serving from July 22, 1868, to March 3, 1869. He was succeeded by fellow Republican Alfred Buck. Kellogg then moved to New York City and later to Alliance, Ohio, where he died. He is interred in Fulton Street Cemetery in Grand Rapids, Michigan.

U.S. House of Representatives
| Preceded by David S. Walbridge | Member of the U.S. House of Representatives from Michigan's 3rd congressional district 1859–1863 | Succeeded by John W. Longyear |
| Preceded by Rowland E. Trowbridge | Member of the U.S. House of Representatives from Michigan's 4th congressional district 1863–1865 | Succeeded by Thomas W. Ferry |
| Preceded by James Adams Stallworth until 1860, then vacant during the American Civil War | Member of the U.S. House of Representatives from Alabama's 1st congressional district July 22, 1868 – March 3, 1869 | Succeeded by Alfred Eliab Buck |
