= James L. Conger =

American politician

Member of the U.S. House of Representatives from Michigan's 3rd district
- In office March 4, 1851 – March 3, 1853
- Preceded by: Kinsley S. Bingham
- Succeeded by: Samuel Clark

Personal details
- Born: James Lockwood Conger; February 18, 1805 Trenton, New Jersey, U.S.
- Died: April 10, 1876 (aged 71) St. Clair, Michigan, U.S.
- Resting place: Green Lawn Cemetery
- Party: Whig
- Relatives: Charles C. Conger (nephew); John P. Jones (nephew-in-law)

James Lockwood Conger (February 18, 1805 – April 10, 1876) was an American lawyer and politician from the U.S. state of Michigan. From 1851 to 1853, he served one term in the U.S. House of Representatives as a member of the Whig party.

== Biography ==
Conger was born in Trenton, New Jersey, and moved with his parents to New York in 1809. They settled in Canandaigua, New York, where he attended the district schools and studied medicine at Canandaigua Academy.

=== Early career ===
In 1822, Conger moved to Lancaster, Ohio, where he taught school for several years and studied law. He was admitted to the bar in 1825 and commenced practice in Lancaster. He soon moved to Cleveland, Ohio, and continued the practice of law from 1826 to 1836.

He later moved to Macomb County, Michigan, and laid out the town of Belvidere, Michigan, which was destroyed by flood in 1837. This was at the mouth of the Clinton River in what is today Harrison Township, Michigan.

He soon moved to Mount Clemens, where he was engaged in banking and mercantile endeavors.

=== Congress ===
In 1850, Conger was elected as a Whig from Michigan's 3rd congressional district to the 32nd United States Congress, serving from March 4, 1851, to March 3, 1853. He declined to be a candidate for renomination in 1852 and resumed his former business pursuits.

=== Retirement and death ===
Owing to ill health, James L. Conger retired from active business pursuits.

He died in St. Clair, Michigan, and was interred in Green Lawn Cemetery in Columbus, Ohio.

== Family ==
Conger's brothers were Thomas Conger, who served as a police judge in Sacramento, California, and David L. Conger, a Wisconsin State Legislator. Thomas's son Charles C. Conger became a California State Senator, and his daughter Hannah Cornelia Conger married future U.S. Senator John P. Jones.

U.S. House of Representatives
Preceded by Kinsley S. Bingham	United States Representative for the 3rd congressional district of Michigan; 1851–1853	Succeeded by Samuel Clark
