= Charles C. Conger =

American politician (1840–1888)

Member of the California Senate from the 9th district
- In office January 5, 1880 – January 8, 1883
- Preceded by: John C. Murphy
- Succeeded by: Multi-member district

Personal details
- Born: April 7, 1840 St. Joseph, Michigan, U.S.
- Died: June 6, 1888 (aged 48) Oakland, California, U.S.
- Party: Democratic (before 1861); Republican (1861–1877, 1880–1888); Workingmen's (1877–1880)
- Spouse(s): Pauline A. Thayer (m. 1863, divorced) Rosalie A. Loeser (m. 1870)
- Children: Antoinette; Charles; Myrtle; Thomas; Louis; Louise; Idalene
- Relatives: James L. Conger (uncle); John P. Jones (brother-in-law)
- Occupation: Stockbroker, military officer, politician

Military service
- Allegiance: United States
- Branch/service: United States Army
- Years of service: 1860; 1865
- Rank: 1st Lieutenant
- Unit: Washoe Regiment; 8th California Infantry Regiment
- Battles/wars: Paiute War; Civil War

Charles Cuthbert Conger (April 7, 1840 – June 6, 1888) was an American stockbroker, military officer and politician who served in the California State Senate from 1880 to 1883. He previously served as County Clerk of the United States District Court in Washoe County, Nevada. He later served eight years on the California Stock Board.

Following the defeat of William Ormsby's militia in the First Battle of Pyramid Lake, Conger joined a volunteer force organized by John Coffee Hays to defeat the Paiute forces of war chief Numaga. Conger later served as adjutant and first lieutenant in the 8th California Infantry Regiment during the Civil War, although that unit never saw combat.
