= Rowland E. Trowbridge =

American politician (1821–1881)

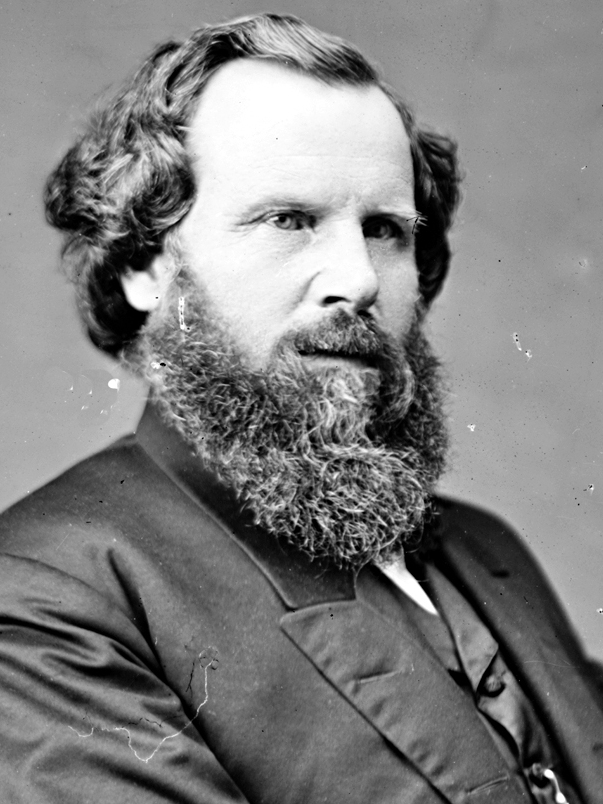

21st Commissioner of Indian Affairs
- In office 1880–1881
- President: Rutherford B. Hayes
- Preceded by: Ezra A. Hayt
- Succeeded by: Hiram Price

Member of the U.S. House of Representatives from Michigan's 4th district
- In office March 4, 1861 – March 3, 1863
- Preceded by: De Witt C. Leach
- Succeeded by: Francis W. Kellogg

Member of the U.S. House of Representatives from Michigan's 5th district
- In office March 4, 1865 – March 4, 1869
- Preceded by: Augustus C. Baldwin
- Succeeded by: Omar D. Conger

Personal details
- Born: June 18, 1821 Michigan, US
- Died: April 20, 1881 (aged 59)
- Party: Republican

Rowland Ebenezer Trowbridge (June 18, 1821 – April 20, 1881) was an American politician from Michigan. A United States congressman from Michigan's 4th congressional district from 1861 to 1863 and again from 1865 to 1869, he worked on agricultural policy and was chairman of the Committee on Agriculture during the 40th United States Congress.

For most of his life he remained a farmer but resumed a role in federal politics from 1880 to 1881 as commissioner of Indian Affairs for President Rutherford B. Hayes.

== Biography ==
=== Early life and education ===
Trowbridge was born in Horseheads, New York to Stephen Van Rensselaer Trowbridge and Elizabeth Conkling. In the first year of his life, he moved with his parents and siblings in 1821 to Oakland County, Michigan, where his family settled a farm in present-day Troy. He had eleven siblings, including mechanical engineer and general William Petit Trowbridge, and fellow general Luther Stephen Trowbridge.

Trowbridge attended Kenyon College in Gambier, Ohio, where befriended future U.S. President Rutherford B. Hayes and future Supreme Court Associate Justice Stanley Matthews, and graduated in 1841. Problems with his vision forced him to halt his ambitions for a career in law.

=== Political career ===
Returning to farming after graduation, he settled in Thorndale, Michigan, in 1848 and began a political career as town supervisor. In 1851 he returned to his parents' county as a farmer and became a member of the Michigan Senate, serving from 1856 to 1860 from Bloomfield, Michigan. He married Mary Ann Satterlee in 1851, with whom he had four children: Susan Elisabeth (1852), Stephen Van Rensselaer (1855), Tillman Conklin (1857), and Samuel Satterlee (1860). They moved to Mary Ann's hometown of Birmingham, Michigan, in 1860, trading the Bloomfield farm for a mill there.

=== Congress ===
The same year, Trowbridge was elected as a Republican from Michigan's 4th congressional district to the 37th United States Congress, serving from March 4, 1861, to March 3, 1863. After redistricting as a result of the 1860 census, Trowbridge ran as a candidate in the newly created 5th congressional district in 1862, losing to Democrat Augustus C. Baldwin. In 1864, Trowbridge defeated Baldwin to be elected to the 39th Congress, and was reelected in 1866 to the 40th Congress, serving from March 4, 1865, to March 3, 1869. He served as chairman of the Committee on Agriculture during the 40th Congress. He was an unsuccessful candidate for re-nomination, and returned to life in farming, purchasing a farm in Lansing in 1873.

=== Later federal service ===
Trowbridge's political career briefly resumed in the last few years of his life, when his college friend Rutherford Hayes was elected President of the United States. He served as commissioner of Indian Affairs under Hayes in 1880 and 1881.

=== Death ===
He died in Birmingham, Michigan, and is interred there in Greenwood Cemetery.

U.S. House of Representatives
Preceded by De Witt C. Leach	United States Representative for the 4th congressional district of Michigan; 1861 – 1863	Succeeded by Francis W. Kellogg
Preceded by Augustus C. Baldwin	United States Representative for the 5th congressional district of Michigan; 1865 – 1869	Succeeded by Omar D. Conger
