= Grand Lodge of Michigan =

American Freemasons' lodge

- Seal of the Grand Lodge of Michigan
- Established: 24 Jun 1826
- Location: United States of America
- Coordinates: 43.389892°N 84.666753°W
- Region served: Michigan
- Website: michiganmasons.org

Current logo used in association with the Grand Lodge of Michigan. This contemporarily styled logo launched with the "Share the Secret" campaign.

The Grand Lodge of Free and Accepted Masons of the State of Michigan, commonly known as the Grand Lodge of Michigan, is the body that governs the practice of regular Freemasonry in the state of Michigan in tandem with the Most Worshipful Prince Hall.

== History ==
The earliest documented Lodge west of the Allegheny Mountains was warranted in Detroit on April 27, 1764, by George Harison, Provincial Grand Master of the Provincial Grand Lodge of New York, with Lt. John Christie of the 2nd Battalion, 60th Royal American Foot Regiment as Worshipful Master. By 1772, there were at least three lodges functioning at Detroit: Lodge No. 1 and two Irish Military Lodges, Nos. 299 and 378, warranted to Masons of the 10th Regiment, then stationed at Detroit. The next three lodges warranted for work in Michigan were also started by members of the visiting military. These were Harmony Lodge in Detroit, St. John's Lodge No. 15 on the island of Mackinac and Zion Lodge No. 10 (now No. 1) warranted in 1794 for work in Detroit.

In September 1817, Zion Lodge provided much needed support for the newly created University of Michigan. The idea first took shape in the minds of Augustus Woodward, a Mason and the first Judge of the Territorial Supreme Court; the Reverend John Monteith, a Presbyterian clergyman and Father Gabriel Richard, a Roman Catholic Priest. On September 15, Zion Lodge met and subscribed the sum of $250 in aid of the University of Michigan, payable in the sum of $50 per year. Of the total amount subscribed to start the University two-thirds came from Zion Lodge and its members.

The members of Zion Lodge sponsored and supported additional lodges in Upper Canada and Michigan including Detroit Lodge No. 337 (now No. 2), Oakland Lodge No. 343 in Pontiac, Menomenie Lodge No. 374 in Green Bay (then a part of the Territory) and Monroe Lodge No. 375 in Monroe. These five lodges laid plans for a Grand Lodge in the Territory to handle the growing plans for Masonry in the area, and on 24 June 1826 a Grand Lodge for the Territory of Michigan was established in Detroit. The first officers elected on 31 July 1826 were the following:

Officers: Lewis Cass - Grand Master; Andrew G. Whitney - Deputy Grand Master; Seneca Allen - Senior Grand Warden; Leonard Weed - Junior Grand Warden; John L. Whiting - Grand Secretary; Henry J. Hunt - Grand Treasurer; Rev. Smith Weeks - Grand Chaplain; John E. Schwartz - Grand Pursuivant; and Samuel Sherwood - Grand Tiler.

The Grand Stewards of Charity: James Abbott, Richard Smyth, Austin E. Wing, Obed Waite, Charles Jackson, John Mullett, John Farrar, Levi Cook, Laban Jenks, Hiram Brown, Robert Irwin, and Robert Irwin Jr.

Grand Master Lewis Cass suspended all Masonic activity in Michigan in 1829 due to the Anti-Masonic agitation precipitated by the Morgan Affair incident of 1826 that occurred in New York. MWGM Cass's suspension would last for 13 years, until Michigan's second Grand Lodge was formed in 1842. In the meantime, Michigan would gain statehood in 1837.

A committee to reorganize the Grand Lodge of Michigan was formed, meeting in Mt. Clemens, Macomb County, in November 1840. In May 1841, Abner C. Smith, tired of the doldrums Michigan Masonry had been in, called for a meeting of leading Michigan Masons held in his house, where it was decided to reorganize Michigan's Grand Lodge. The meeting was adjourned. The second Grand Lodge of Michigan was formed in June 1842 under the leadership of Grand Junior Warden Martin Davis of Ann Arbor and Grand Secretary Abner C. Smith, resulting in Leonard Weed being elected Grand Master of the new grand lodge.

In the meantime, the “Brethren of St. Joseph Valley Lodge at Niles, Berrien Co., tiring of the situation, had asked and obtained [two years prior], after some delay, a charter from Grand Lodge of New York, dated June 10th, 1843, and ranked on the NY. Register No. 93."

However, due to the 1842 incarnation of the Grand Lodge of Michigan not being officially recognized by the Grand Lodge of New York, and inspired by the bold actions of St. Joseph Valley Lodge in 1843, a few of the established lodges of Michigan applied for Charters under the Grand Lodge of New York, and were granted them. "The legal representatives of theses four Lodges [operating under the authority and jurisdiction of the Grand Lodge of New York], viz. St. Joseph No. 93, Zion 99, Detroit 100 and Oakland 101, met in Convention at Detroit, adopted a Grand Lodge Constitution, organized the present Grand Lodge of Michigan, and elected its Officers, on the 17th day of September 1844. John Mullett, elected Grand Master, was installed by Past Grand Master Lewis Cass, at an emergent communication … [and the] illegal Grand Lodge [of 1842] was dissolved."

The Michigan Masonic Home (dba Masonic Pathways) was founded in 1890 in East Grand Rapids "for the purpose of providing a home for aged masons, mason’s widows and orphans." The facility was first dedicated on March 29, 1912, and was originally located in Grand Rapids, but after it was destroyed by a fire on February 16, 1910. The Masonic Home was relocated to Alma in the former Alma Sanitarium building of Alma’s Ammi Wright, and opened to residents in 1911.

During the term of Grand Master Richard P. Ruhland from 2005-2006, the Grand Lodge Board of Directors decided to relocate the Grand Lodge office from Grand Rapids to Alma in 2005. The facility was dedicated on January 28, 2006.

There were 274 lodges in the State of Michigan as of 2019. As of 2025, there are 243 Masonic Blue Lodges in Michigan, and approximately 18,200 Masons (non dual, or honorary).

== Prince Hall recognition ==
The Grand Lodge of Michigan granted fraternal recognition to Prince Hall Grand Lodge of Michigan in 1997. A mutual recognition resolution between Grand Lodge of Michigan and the Most Worshipful Prince Hall Grand Lodge of Michigan was signed on March 28, 1997, by Grand Master’s Donald J. Van Kirk and Carl W. Sanders. The formal signing ceremony for the Mutual Recognition was celebrated at the 'Unity Celebration Gala' in 2025. The black tie gala and ‘celebration of brotherly love and mutual recognition’ was held in the Crystal Ballroom at the Detroit Masonic Temple on March 23, 2025, and signed by Grand Master's Eugene E. Abbaticchio and Bernt C. Walker.

== List of Michigan Grand Lodges ==
This is a list of the past iterations of, and the current, Grand Lodge of Michigan.

No.	Years active	Name	Chartered	Dissolved	Jurisdiction	City	Note
01	1826–1829	Grand Lodge for the Territory of Michigan	1826 Jun 24	1829	Grand Lodge of New York	Detroit	In June 1829, Grand Master Lewis Cass suspended all state Masonic activity "for the time being" during Anti-Masonic Period
NA	1829–1842	Suspended Activities	NA	NA	NA	NA	Masonic activity suspended during Anti-Masonic Period by GM Lewis Cass
02	1842–1844	Grand Lodge of the State of Michigan	1842 Jan 06	1844 Sep 17		Detroit	1842 Mich. GL deemed irregular, and disbanded in 1844
03	1844–present	Grand Lodge of the State of Michigan	1844 Nov	Present		Detroit / Grand Rapids / Alma	

== Notable grand masters ==
Notable past grand masters in Michigan include:

- Lewis Cass, 1826-1829
- John Mullett, 1843-1845
- Henry T. Backus, 1851 –1853
- George Washington Peck, 1854-1855
- Levi Cook, 1857
- William M. Fenton, 1858
- William L. Greenly, 1860
- John W. Champlin, 1871
- George H. Durand, 1875
- Oliver L. Spaulding, 1881
- Louis H. Fead, 1917

== List of lodges ==
List of Masonic Blue Lodges in Michigan, current and/or historic, from 1764 to Present. There were 243 Masonic Blue Lodges in Michigan as of 2025. The "years active" date column shows year range that includes dispensation or charter for first year, and dissolution or consolidation for last year.

Several of the early lodges in the northwest territory, before Michigan’s statehood in 1837, were chartered by remote or foreign jurisdictions prior to the establishment of the Grand Lodge of Michigan in 1826 and their integration into Michigan’s new jurisdiction as Free and Accepted Masons (F&AM). Due to this, several of these early "lodges of the Northwest Territory were then renumbered", and reordered between 1826 and 1850.

Over the years there have been examples of themed or "special interest lodges" within the Michigan jurisdiction, although not as prevalent as the more than 400 special interest lodges across England and Wales.

Notable Masonic lodges

- Zion Lodge No. 1 F&AM, Detroit (1764-present)

== See also ==
- Detroit Masonic Temple
