= Dewitt C. Leach =

American politician (1822–1909)

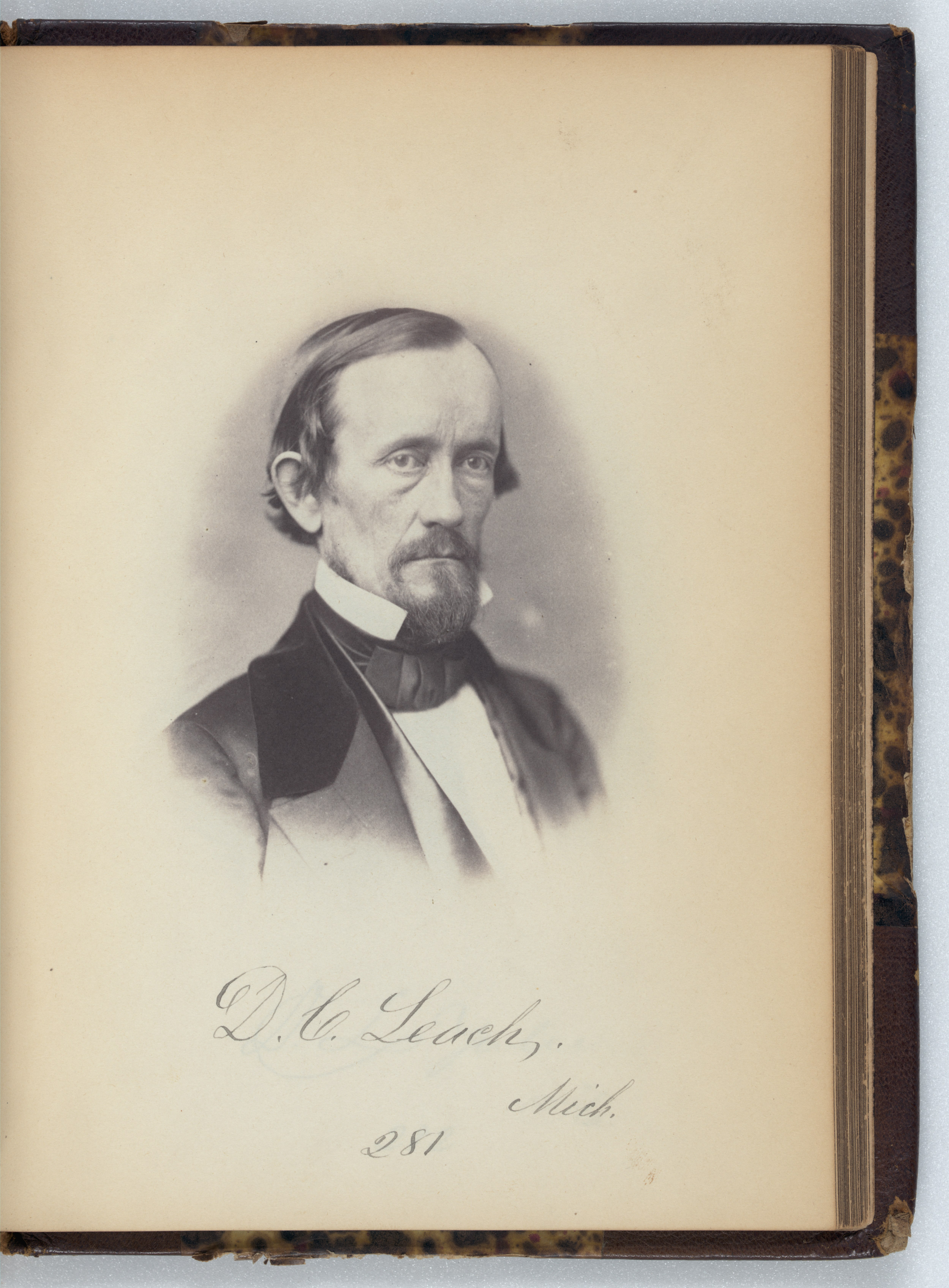
- From 1859's McClees' Gallery of Photographic Portraits of the Senators, Representatives & Delegates of the Thirty-Fifth Congress

Member of the U.S. House of Representatives from Michigan's 4th district
- In office March 4, 1857 – March 3, 1861
- Preceded by: George Washington Peck
- Succeeded by: Rowland E. Trowbridge

Personal details
- Born: November 23, 1822 Clarence, New York, U.S.
- Died: December 21, 1909 (aged 87) Springfield, Missouri, U.S.
- Party: Republican

Dewitt Clinton Leach (November 23, 1822 – December 21, 1909) was a politician and newspaperman from the U.S. state of Michigan.

Leach was born in Clarence, New York, and moved with his parents to Genesee County, Michigan, in early youth. He attended the common schools, taught school, and located in Lansing in 1841. He was editor of the Michigan State Republican for several years. He was a member of the Michigan House of Representatives in 1849 and 1850 and a delegate to the State constitutional convention in 1850. He was present at the formation of the Republican Party at Jackson, Michigan, July 6, 1854. He was State librarian, 1855–1857.

Leach was elected as a Republican from Michigan's 4th congressional district to the 35th and 36th United States Congresses, serving from March 4, 1857, to March 3, 1861. He was not a candidate for renomination in 1860.

Leach was Indian agent for Michigan, by appointment of U.S. President Abraham Lincoln, 1861–1865. He moved to Traverse City, Michigan, in 1865, and published the Grand Traverse Herald for nine years. He was a delegate to the State constitutional convention in 1867. He moved to Springfield, Missouri, in 1875, where he published the Patriot Advertiser. He returned to Traverse City in 1882 and published the Northwest Farmer. He retired in 1902 and returned to Springfield where he died and was interred in Maple Park Cemetery.

U.S. House of Representatives
Preceded by George Washington Peck	United States Representative for the 4th congressional district of Michigan; 1857 – 1861	Succeeded by Rowland E. Trowbridge
