= Stephen V. R. Trowbridge (Michigan legislator) =

American politician

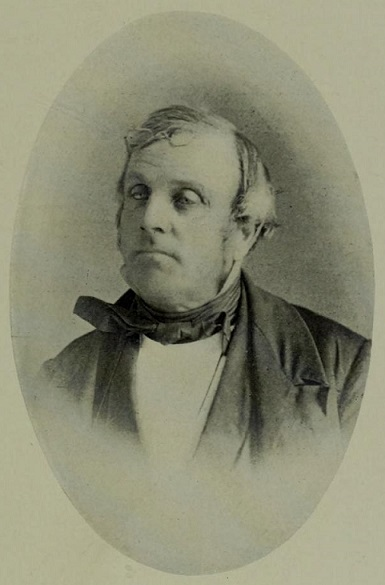

Member of the Michigan Senate from the 6th district
- In office January 3, 1842 – 1842

Member of the Michigan Senate from the 3rd district
- In office January 7, 1839 – 1841

Personal details
- Born: July 4, 1794 Albany, New York, US
- Died: March 1, 1859 (aged 64) Troy, Michigan, US
- Party: Whig
- Spouse: Elizabeth Conkling

Stephen Van Rensselaer Trowbridge (July 4, 1794 – March 1, 1859) was a Michigander politician.

== Early life ==
Trowbridge was born on July 4, 1794, in Albany, New York. Trowbridge moved to Oakland County, Michigan, in 1821.

== Career ==
In 1827, Trowbridge became the first supervisor of Troy, Michigan. Trowbridge was a member of the Michigan Territorial Council from Oakland County from 1828 to 1829. On November 5, 1838, Trowbridge was elected to the Michigan Senate where he represented the 3rd district from January 7, 1839, to 1841. On November 1, 1841, Trowbridge was again elected to the Michigan Senate where he represented the 6th district from January 3, 1842, until the end of 1842.

== Personal life ==
Trowbridge married Elizabeth Conkling in Horseheads, New York, in 1815. Together they had at least nine children, including United States Representative Rowland E. Trowbridge. Trowbridge was Presbyterian.

== Death ==
Trowbridge died in Troy, Michigan, on March 1, 1859. Trowbridge was interred at Beach Cemetery in Troy.
