= Stephen V. R. Trowbridge (Michigan Attorney General) =

American lawyer and politician

Michigan Attorney General
- In office 1889 – May 25, 1890
- Governor: Cyrus G. Luce
- Preceded by: Moses Taggart
- Succeeded by: Benjamin W. Huston

Personal details
- Born: January 1, 1855 Bloomfield, Michigan
- Died: April 19, 1891 (aged 36) Birmingham, Michigan
- Education: University of Michigan

Stephen Van Rensselaer Trowbridge (January 1, 1855 – April 19, 1891) was a Michigan lawyer.

== Early life ==
Trowbridge was born in Bloomfield, Michigan on January 1, 1855 to parents Rowland Ebenezer and Mary Ann Trowbrige.

== Education ==
Trowbridge attended the University of Michigan with the class of 1876, but he left the college in the fall of his senior year, and started to study law with the firm Morse & Wilson in Ionia, Michigan from 1877 to 1879.

== Career ==
After studying law with Morse & Wilson, Trowbridge began practicing law in Ionia. Trowbridge was the prosecuting attorney for Ionia County from 1881 to 1882. Trowbridge was elected to the position of Michigan Attorney General in 1889 and resigned from the position on May 25, 1890 due to his poor health.

== Death ==
Trowbridge died in Birmingham, Michigan on April 19, 1891.

Legal offices
Preceded by Moses Taggart	Michigan Attorney General; 1889–1890	Succeeded by Benjamin W. Huston
