= List of former United States representatives (V) =

This is a complete list of former United States representatives whose last names begin with the letter V.

== Number of years and terms the member has served ==
The number of years the representative/delegate has served in Congress indicates the number of terms the representative/delegate has. Note the representative/delegate can also serve non-consecutive terms if the representative/delegate loses election and wins re-election to the House.

- 2 years - 1 or 2 terms
- 4 years - 2 or 3 terms
- 6 years - 3 or 4 terms
- 8 years - 4 or 5 terms
- 10 years - 5 or 6 terms
- 12 years - 6 or 7 terms
- 14 years - 7 or 8 terms
- 16 years - 8 or 9 terms
- 18 years - 9 or 10 terms
- 20 years - 10 or 11 terms
- 22 years - 11 or 12 terms
- 24 years - 12 or 13 terms
- 26 years - 13 or 14 terms
- 28 years - 14 or 15 terms
- 30 years - 15 or 16 terms
- 32 years - 16 or 17 terms
- 34 years - 17 or 18 terms
- 36 years - 18 or 19 terms
- 38 years - 19 or 20 terms
- 40 years - 20 or 21 terms
- 42 years - 21 or 22 terms
- 44 years - 22 or 23 terms
- 46 years - 23 or 24 terms
- 48 years - 24 or 25 terms
- 50 years - 25 or 26 terms
- 52 years - 26 or 27 terms
- 54 years - 27 or 28 terms
- 56 years - 28 or 29 terms
- 58 years - 29 or 30 terms

| Name | Term | State/ Territory | Party | Lifespan |
|---|---|---|---|---|
| George Vail | 1853–1857 | New Jersey | Democratic | 1809–1875 |
| Henry Vail | 1837–1839 | New York | Democratic | 1782–1853 |
| Richard B. Vail | 1947–1949; 1951–1953 | Illinois | Republican | 1895–1955 |
| William N. Vaile | 1919–1927 | Colorado | Republican | 1876–1927 |
| Edward K. Valentine | 1879–1885 | Nebraska | Republican | 1843–1916 |
| Tim Valentine | 1983–1995 | North Carolina | Democratic | 1926–2015 |
| William Valk | 1855–1857 | New York | American | 1806–1879 |
| Clement Vallandigham | 1858–1863 | Ohio | Democratic | 1820–1871 |
| Henry Van Aernam | 1865–1869; 1879–1883 | New York | Republican | 1819–1894 |
| James I. Van Alen | 1807–1809 | New York | Democratic-Republican | 1772–1822 |
| John Evert Van Alen | 1793–1795 | New York | Pro-Administration | 1749–1807 |
| John Evert Van Alen | 1795–1799 | New York | Federalist | 1749–1807 |
| Thomas J. Van Alstyne | 1883–1885 | New York | Democratic | 1827–1903 |
| Daniel Myers Van Auken | 1867–1871 | Pennsylvania | Democratic | 1826–1908 |
| John Van Buren | 1841–1843 | New York | Democratic | 1799–1855 |
| Philip Van Cortlandt | 1793–1795 | New York | Anti-Administration | 1749–1831 |
| Philip Van Cortlandt | 1795–1809 | New York | Democratic-Republican | 1749–1831 |
| Pierre Van Cortlandt Jr. | 1811–1813 | New York | Democratic-Republican | 1762–1848 |
| Lionel Van Deerlin | 1963–1981 | California | Democratic | 1914–2008 |
| Clarence D. Van Duzer | 1903–1907 | Nevada | Democratic | 1864–1947 |
| Carl Van Dyke | 1915–1919 | Minnesota | Democratic | 1881–1919 |
| John Van Dyke | 1847–1851 | New Jersey | Whig | 1807–1878 |
| Nicholas Van Dyke | 1807–1811 | Delaware | Federalist | 1769–1826 |
| Henry Smith Van Eaton | 1883–1887 | Mississippi | Democratic | 1826–1898 |
| Peter Van Gaasbeck | 1793–1795 | New York | Pro-Administration | 1754–1797 |
| Chris Van Hollen | 2003–2017 | Maryland | Democratic | 1959–present |
| Burt Van Horn | 1861–1863; 1865–1869 | New York | Republican | 1823–1896 |
| George Van Horn | 1891–1893 | New York | Democratic | 1850–1904 |
| Robert T. Van Horn | 1865–1871; 1881–1883; 1896–1897 | Missouri | Republican | 1824–1916 |
| Archibald Van Horne | 1807–1811 | Maryland | Democratic-Republican | 1758–1817 |
| Espy Van Horne | 1825–1829 | Pennsylvania | Democratic | 1795–1829 |
| Isaac Van Horne | 1801–1805 | Pennsylvania | Democratic-Republican | 1754–1834 |
| Isaac B. Van Houten | 1833–1835 | New York | Democratic | 1776–1850 |
| John Peter Van Ness | 1801–1803 | New York | Democratic-Republican | 1769–1846 |
| William Van Pelt | 1951–1965 | Wisconsin | Republican | 1905–1996 |
| Henry Bell Van Rensselaer | 1841–1843 | New York | Whig | 1810–1864 |
| Jeremiah Van Rensselaer | 1789–1791 | New York | Anti-Administration | 1738–1810 |
| Killian K. Van Rensselaer | 1801–1811 | New York | Federalist | 1763–1845 |
| Solomon Van Rensselaer | 1819–1822 | New York | Federalist | 1774–1852 |
| Stephen Van Rensselaer III | 1822–1825 | New York | Federalist | 1764–1839 |
| Stephen Van Rensselaer III | 1825–1829 | New York | National Republican | 1764–1839 |
| Joshua Van Sant | 1853–1855 | Maryland | Democratic | 1803–1884 |
| Isaac W. Van Schaick | 1885–1887; 1889–1891 | Wisconsin | Republican | 1817–1901 |
| Thomas Van Swearingen | 1819–1821 | Virginia | Democratic-Republican | 1784–1822 |
| Thomas Van Swearingen | 1821–1822 | Virginia | Federalist | 1784–1822 |
| Philadelph Van Trump | 1867–1873 | Ohio | Democratic | 1810–1874 |
| Robert B. Van Valkenburgh | 1861–1865 | New York | Republican | 1821–1888 |
| H. Clay Van Voorhis | 1893–1905 | Ohio | Republican | 1852–1927 |
| John Van Voorhis | 1879–1883; 1893–1895 | New York | Republican | 1826–1905 |
| Nelson H. Van Vorhes | 1875–1879 | Ohio | Republican | 1822–1882 |
| Marshall Van Winkle | 1905–1907 | New Jersey | Republican | 1869–1957 |
| Charles Van Wyck | 1859–1863; 1867–1869; 1870–1871 | New York | Republican | 1824–1895 |
| William W. Van Wyck | 1821–1825 | New York | Democratic-Republican | 1777–1840 |
| James E. Van Zandt | 1939–1943; 1947–1963 | Pennsylvania | Republican | 1898–1986 |
| John L. Vance | 1875–1877 | Ohio | Democratic | 1839–1921 |
| Joseph Vance | 1821–1825 | Ohio | Democratic-Republican | 1786–1852 |
| Joseph Vance | 1825–1835 | Ohio | National Republican | 1786–1852 |
| Joseph Vance | 1843–1847 | Ohio | Whig | 1786–1852 |
| Robert B. Vance | 1873–1885 | North Carolina | Democratic | 1828–1899 |
| Robert Brank Vance | 1823–1825 | North Carolina | Democratic-Republican | 1793–1827 |
| Robert J. Vance | 1887–1889 | Connecticut | Democratic | 1854–1902 |
| Zebulon Vance | 1858–1861 | North Carolina | Democratic | 1830–1894 |
| Guy Vander Jagt | 1966–1993 | Michigan | Republican | 1931–2007 |
| Richard Vander Veen | 1974–1977 | Michigan | Democratic | 1922–2006 |
| Tom Vandergriff | 1983–1985 | Texas | Democratic | 1926–2010 |
| Aaron Vanderpoel | 1833–1837; 1839–1841 | New York | Democratic | 1799–1870 |
| Abraham Vanderveer | 1837–1839 | New York | Democratic | 1781–1839 |
| William Vandever | 1859–1861 | Iowa | Republican | 1817–1893 |
| William Vandever | 1887–1891 | California | Republican | 1817–1893 |
| Willard Duncan Vandiver | 1897–1905 | Missouri | Democratic | 1854–1932 |
| Charles Vanik | 1955–1981 | Ohio | Democratic | 1913–2007 |
| John I. Vanmeter | 1843–1845 | Ohio | Whig | 1798–1875 |
| William Scott Vare | 1912–1923; 1923–1927 | Pennsylvania | Republican | 1867–1934 |
| John Varnum | 1825–1831 | Massachusetts | National Republican | 1778–1836 |
| Joseph Bradley Varnum | 1795–1811 | Massachusetts | Democratic-Republican | 1750/1-1821 |
| Horace W. Vaughan | 1913–1915 | Texas | Democratic | 1867–1922 |
| William Wirt Vaughan | 1871–1873 | Tennessee | Democratic | 1831–1878 |
| Albert C. Vaughn | 1951 | Pennsylvania | Republican | 1894–1951 |
| Richard Vaux | 1890–1891 | Pennsylvania | Democratic | 1816–1895 |
| William D. Veeder | 1877–1879 | New York | Democratic | 1835–1910 |
| John H. G. Vehslage | 1897–1899 | New York | Democratic | 1842–1904 |
| Filemon Vela Jr. | 2013–2022 | Texas | Democratic | 1963–present |
| Harold H. Velde | 1949–1957 | Illinois | Republican | 1910–1985 |
| Abraham B. Venable | 1791–1795 | Virginia | Anti-Administration | 1758–1811 |
| Abraham B. Venable | 1795–1799 | Virginia | Democratic-Republican | 1758–1811 |
| Abraham Watkins Venable | 1847–1853 | North Carolina | Democratic | 1799–1876 |
| Edward Carrington Venable | 1889–1890 | Virginia | Democratic | 1853–1908 |
| William W. Venable | 1916–1921 | Mississippi | Democratic | 1880–1948 |
| Bruce Vento | 1977–2000 | Minnesota | Democratic-Farmer-Labor | 1940–2000 |
| Daniel C. Verplanck | 1803–1809 | New York | Democratic-Republican | 1762–1834 |
| Gulian C. Verplanck | 1825–1833 | New York | Democratic | 1786–1870 |
| John Paul Verree | 1859–1863 | Pennsylvania | Republican | 1817–1889 |
| Albert Henry Vestal | 1917–1932 | Indiana | Republican | 1875–1932 |
| Victor Veysey | 1971–1975 | California | Republican | 1915–2001 |
| Chauncey Vibbard | 1861–1863 | New York | Democratic | 1811–1891 |
| Michel Vidal | 1868–1869 | Louisiana | Republican | 1824-1895 |
| Egbert Ludovicus Viele | 1885–1887 | New York | Democratic | 1825–1902 |
| Joseph P. Vigorito | 1965–1977 | Pennsylvania | Democratic | 1918–2003 |
| Beverly M. Vincent | 1937–1945 | Kentucky | Democratic | 1890–1980 |
| Bird J. Vincent | 1923–1931 | Michigan | Republican | 1880–1931 |
| Earl W. Vincent | 1928–1929 | Iowa | Republican | 1886–1953 |
| William D. Vincent | 1897–1899 | Kansas | Populist | 1852–1922 |
| John Vining | 1789–1793 | Delaware | Pro-Administration | 1758–1802 |
| Carl Vinson | 1914–1965 | Georgia | Democratic | 1883–1981 |
| Fred M. Vinson | 1924–1929; 1931–1938 | Kentucky | Democratic | 1890–1953 |
| Samuel F. Vinton | 1823–1825 | Ohio | Democratic-Republican | 1792–1862 |
| Samuel F. Vinton | 1825–1835 | Ohio | National Republican | 1792–1862 |
| Samuel F. Vinton | 1835–1837; 1843–1851 | Ohio | Whig | 1792–1862 |
| Pete Visclosky | 1985–2021 | Indiana | Democratic | 1949–present |
| David Vitter | 1999–2005 | Louisiana | Republican | 1961–present |
| Weston E. Vivian | 1965–1967 | Michigan | Democratic | 1924–2020 |
| Edward Voigt | 1917–1927 | Wisconsin | Republican | 1873–1934 |
| Lester D. Volk | 1920–1923 | New York | Republican | 1884–1962 |
| Harold Volkmer | 1977–1997 | Missouri | Democratic | 1931–2011 |
| Henry Vollmer | 1914–1915 | Iowa | Democratic | 1867–1930 |
| Andrew Volstead | 1903–1923 | Minnesota | Republican | 1860–1947 |
| Charles Stewart Voorhees | 1885–1889 | Washington | Democratic | 1853-1909 |
| Daniel W. Voorhees | 1861–1866; 1869–1873 | Indiana | Democratic | 1827–1897 |
| Charles H. Voorhis | 1879–1881 | New Jersey | Republican | 1833–1896 |
| Jerry Voorhis | 1937–1947 | California | Democratic | 1901–1984 |
| John M. Vorys | 1939–1959 | Ohio | Republican | 1896–1968 |
| Roger Vose | 1813–1817 | New Hampshire | Federalist | 1763–1841 |
| Albert L. Vreeland | 1939–1943 | New Jersey | Republican | 1901–1975 |
| Edward B. Vreeland | 1899–1913 | New York | Republican | 1856–1936 |
| Peter D. Vroom | 1839–1841 | New Jersey | Democratic | 1791–1873 |
| Barbara Vucanovich | 1983–1997 | Nevada | Republican | 1921–2013 |
| Charles W. Vursell | 1943–1959 | Illinois | Republican | 1881–1974 |
