= Jacob Steendam =

American poet

Jacob Jacobsz Steendam (1615 in Kniphausen – c. 1672 in Batavia, Dutch East Indies) was a Dutch poet and a minister. He collaborated with Pieter Corneliszoon Plockhoy.

== Biography ==
Though born in East Frisia, Steendam grew up in Enkhuizen. His first poetry dates from 1636. He was a member of the circle of Jan Zoet. Already as a young man Steendam served the Dutch West India Company. In 1641 he went to Gold Coast and had an affair with a local woman. Back in Holland he became precentor in Zaandam, and in November 1649 he married Sara Abrahams Roschou in Amsterdam. Steendam published a 3-volume poetry collection, Den Distelvink ("The Goldfinch") in 1649/1650 in that city. Jacob and Sara sailed to the colony of New Amsterdam about 1650, and stayed there till 1662, when they returned to Holland. During his residence in the Dutch settlement, he owned farms at Amersfort and Maspeth, a house and lot on what is now Pearl Street, and another on Broadway. He lost his fortune when the English took over Manhattan. He left New Netherland, joined the Dutch East India Company and in 1665/66 the couple took off to Batavia. Here they managed an orphanage and Steendam continued to publish poetry and to contribute to Dutch Indies literature until 1671.

== Rediscovery ==
In the late 19th century, Henry Cruse Murphy, when he U.S. Minister to the Netherlands and resident in The Hague, rediscovered the poems written by Steendam and other Dutch poets in New Amsterdam, and had them published with English translations in the same metre. Murphy's book is entitled Jacob Steendam noch vaster. A Memoir of the First Poet in New Netherlands, with his Poems descriptive of the Colony (The Hague, 1861). The titles of the two poems are Klacht van Nieuw-Amsterdam (published in Amsterdam in 1659; translated as: Complaint of New Amsterdam, in New Netherlands, to her Mother, of her Beginning, Growth, and Present Condition) and 't Lof van Nuw-Nederland (1661; The Praise of New Netherlands: Spurring Verses to the Lovers of the Colony and Brothership to be established on the South River of New Netherland by Pieter Corneliszoon Plockhoy van Ziereckzee" (published in 1661).
