= Denis O'Leary =

American politician

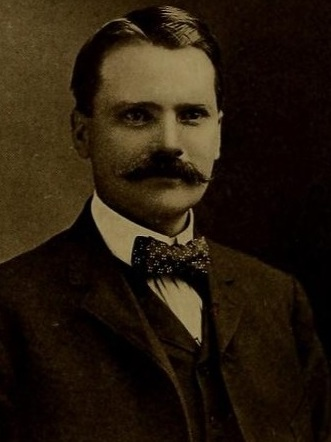

Queens County District Attorney
- In office January 1, 1915 – December 31, 1920
- Preceded by: Matthew J. Smith
- Succeeded by: Dana Wallace

Member of the U.S. House of Representatives from New York's 2nd district
- In office March 4, 1913 – December 31, 1914
- Preceded by: George H. Lindsay
- Succeeded by: C. Pope Caldwell

Personal details
- Born: January 22, 1863 Manhasset, New York, US
- Died: September 27, 1943 (aged 80) Douglaston, Queens, New York, US
- Party: Democratic and Republican

Denis O'Leary (January 22, 1863 – September 27, 1943) was an American educator, lawyer, and politician who served as Queens County district attorney and for one year as a member of the United States House of Representatives from New York, from 1913 to 1914.

== Biography ==
=== Early life and education ===
O'Leary was born on January 22, 1863, in Manhasset, Long Island, New York. He attended and later taught in the public schools. He was graduated from the law school of New York University in 1890. O`Leary was admitted to the bar the same year and commenced practice in New York City.

=== Political career ===
He was assistant corporation counsel of New York City in 1905 and 1906 and commissioner of public works of Queens Borough in 1911 and 1912.

==== Congress ====
O`Leary was elected as a Democrat to the Sixty-third Congress and served from March 4, 1913, until December 31, 1914, when he resigned.

==== District attorney ====
He later served as district attorney of Queens County 1915-1921.

=== Later career and death ===
He resumed the practice of law until 1929 when he retired. He died in Douglaston, Queens County, N.Y., September 27, 1943.

U.S. House of Representatives
Preceded by George H. Lindsay	Member of the U.S. House of Representatives from New York's 2nd congressional district 1913–1914	Succeeded by C. Pope Caldwell
Legal offices
Preceded by Matthew J. Smith	Queens County District Attorney; 1915–1920	Succeeded by Dana Wallace
