= John G. Schumaker =

American politician

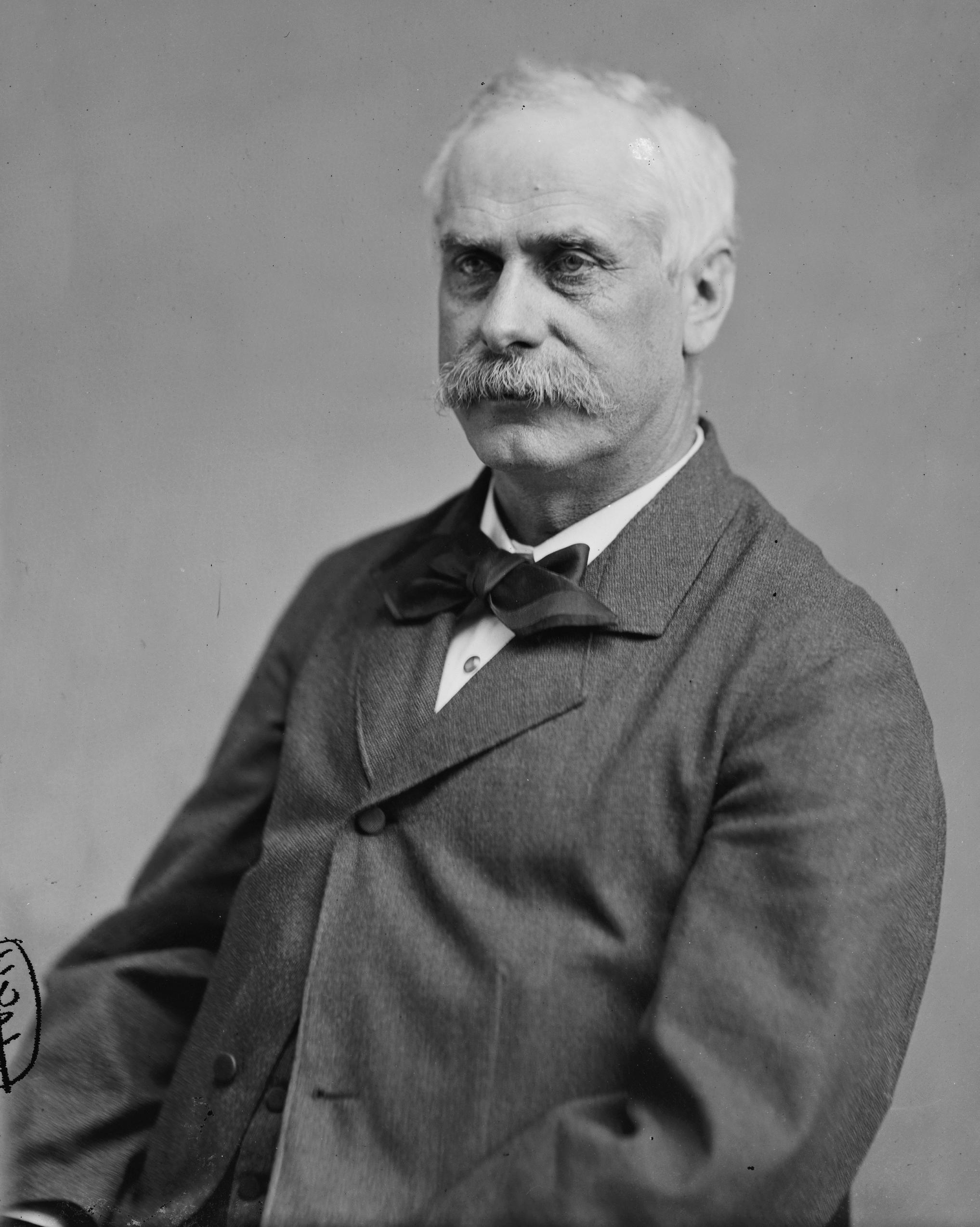
John G. Schumaker

John Godfrey Schumaker (June 27, 1826 – November 23, 1905) was an American lawyer and politician who served one term as a United States representative from New York from 1869 to 1871.

== Biography ==
Born in Claverack, Columbia County, Schumaker completed preparatory studies in the Lenox Academy in Massachusetts. He studied law, was admitted to the bar and commenced practice in 1847. In 1853, he moved to Brooklyn and continued the practice of law. He was district attorney for Kings County (Brooklyn) from 1856 to 1859, and was corporation counsel for the city of Brooklyn from 1862 to 1864.

He was a member of the State constitutional conventions in 1862, 1867, and 1894, and was a delegate to the Democratic National Convention in 1864.

=== Congress ===
Schumaker was elected as a Democrat to the Forty-first Congress, holding office from March 4, 1869, to March 3, 1871; he was not a candidate for renomination in 1870, but was elected to the Forty-third and Forty-fourth Congresses, again holding office from March 4, 1873, to March 3, 1877. He was not a candidate for renomination in 1876 to the Forty-fifth Congress.

=== Later career and death ===
After leaving Congress, he resumed the practice of law. He died in Brooklyn in 1905; interment was in Green-Wood Cemetery.

U.S. House of Representatives
Preceded by Demas Barnes	Member of the U.S. House of Representatives from New York's 2nd congressional district 1869–1871	Succeeded by Thomas Kinsella
Preceded by Thomas Kinsella	Member of the U.S. House of Representatives from New York's 2nd congressional district 1873–1877	Succeeded by William D. Veeder
