= David A. Bokee =

American politician

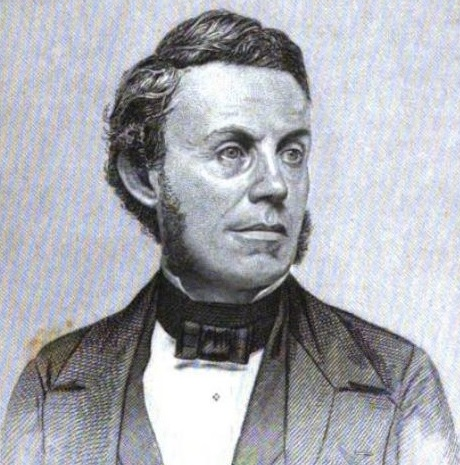

Member of the U.S. House of Representatives from New York's 2nd district
- In office March 4, 1849 – March 3, 1851
- Preceded by: Henry Cruse Murphy
- Succeeded by: Obadiah Bowne

Member of the New York Senate from the 2nd district
- In office January 1, 1848 – December 31, 1849
- Preceded by: new district
- Succeeded by: John A. Cross

Personal details
- Born: David Alexander Bokee; October 6, 1805 New York City, US
- Died: March 15, 1860 (aged 54) Washington, D.C., US
- Resting place: Green-Wood Cemetery in Brooklyn
- Party: Whig
- Spouse: Sarah Ann Dowdny
- Children: Helena Stevens Bokee Frederick William Bokee Margaret Swanston Bokee Joseph Moore Bokee David Alexander Bokee William Blossom Bokee
- Profession: Attorney merchant politician

David Alexander Bokee (October 6, 1805 – March 15, 1860) was an American lawyer, merchant and politician from New York who served one term in the U.S. House of Representatives from 1849 to 1851.

== Biography ==
Born in New York City, Bokee was the son of Frederick and Rachel McKenzie Bokee and attended the public schools. He then engaged in mercantile pursuits while he studied law. He was admitted to the bar, and practiced law. Later he was also a shipping merchant. He married Sarah Ann Dowdny and they had six children, Helena, Frederick, Margaret, Joseph, David, and William.

== Career ==
Bokee was President of the Brooklyn Board of Aldermen from 1840 to 1843; and again from 1845 to 1848. He was a member of the New York State Senate (2nd D.) in 1848 and 1849. He was also a Trustee of the New York Life Insurance Company from 1848 to 1860.

=== Congress and Fillmore administration ===
He was elected as a Whig to the 31st United States Congress, holding office from March 4, 1849, to March 3, 1851. Bokee was appointed by President Millard Fillmore as Naval Officer of the Port of New York, and remained in office from 1851 to 1853.

=== Death and burial ===
Bokee died on March 15, 1860, in Washington, D.C.; and was buried at the Green-Wood Cemetery in Brooklyn.

New York State Senate
Preceded by new district	New York State Senate; 2nd District; 1848–1849	Succeeded by John A. Cross
U.S. House of Representatives
Preceded by Henry Cruse Murphy	Member of the U.S. House of Representatives from New York's 2nd congressional district 1849–1851	Succeeded by Obadiah Bowne
