= Jacob Crocheron =

American politician

Member of the U.S. House of Representatives from New York's 2nd district
- In office March 4, 1829 – March 3, 1831
- Preceded by: John J. Wood
- Succeeded by: John T. Bergen

Sheriff of Richmond County
- In office 1821
- In office 1811
- In office 1802

Personal details
- Born: August 23, 1774 Staten Island, Province of New York, British America
- Died: December 27, 1849 (aged 75) Staten Island, New York, U.S.
- Party: Jacksonian

Jacob Crocheron (August 23, 1774 – December 27, 1849) was an American farmer and law enforcement officer who served one term as a U.S. representative from New York, United States from 1829 to 1831.

He was the brother of Henry Crocheron.

== Biography ==
Born on Staten Island, Richmond County, New York, Crocheron engaged in agricultural pursuits. Sheriff of Richmond County in 1802, 1811, and again in 1821.

Crocheron was a presidential elector in the 1836 presidential election.

=== Congress ===
Crocheron was elected as a Jacksonian to the Twenty-first Congress (March 4, 1829 – March 3, 1831).

=== Death ===
He died in Richmond County, Staten Island, on December 27, 1849. He was interred in St. Andrew's Churchyard, Staten Island, New York.

U.S. House of Representatives
Preceded by John J. Wood	Member of the U.S. House of Representatives from New York's 2nd congressional district 1829–1831	Succeeded by John T. Bergen
