= 1867 United States Senate election in New York =

- January 15, 1867

Majority vote of each house needed to win
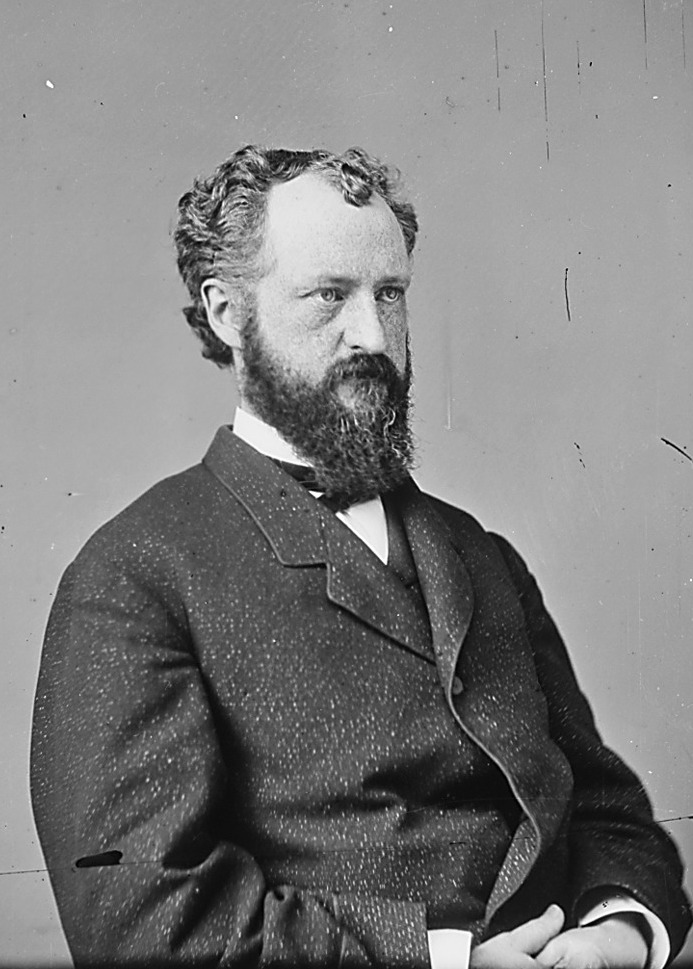

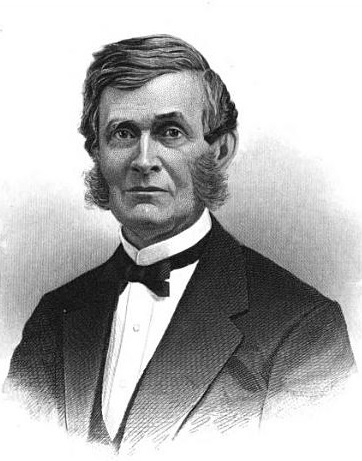
Nominee	Roscoe Conkling	Henry C. Murphy
Party	Republican	Democratic
Senate	24	2
Percentage	75%	6.25%
House	78	42
Percentage	60.94%	32.81%
Senator before election
Ira Harris
Republican
Elected Senator
Roscoe Conkling
Republican

The 1867 United States Senate election in New York was held on January 15, 1867, by the New York State Legislature to elect a U.S. senator (Class 3) to represent the State of New York in the United States Senate. Incumbent Senator Ira Harris was not renominated for a second term in office. U.S. Representative Roscoe Conkling was elected to succeed him.

With large Republican majorities in both houses of the Legislature, the real contest was for Republican Party support, which was determined in a joint caucus of Senate and Assembly Republicans. A three-way race between Harris, Conkling, and Judge Noah Davis eventually gave way to a two-way contest between Conkling and Davis, with Conkling prevailing on the fifth ballot.

== Background ==
Republican Ira Harris had been elected in February 1861 to this seat, and his term would expire on March 3, 1867.

At the State election in November 1865, 27 Republicans and 5 Democrats were elected for a two-year term (1866–1867) in the State Senate. At the State election in November 1866, 82 Republicans and 46 Democrats were elected for the session of 1867 to the Assembly. The 90th State Legislature met from January 1 to April 20, 1867, at Albany, New York.

== Republican caucus ==
=== Candidates ===
- Ransom Balcom, judge of the New York Supreme Court from Binghamton
- Roscoe Conkling, U.S. Representative from Utica
- Noah Davis, judge of the New York Supreme Court from Albion
- Charles J. Folger, State Senator from Canandaigua
- Horace Greeley, founder and editor of the New York Tribune and former U.S. Representative from New York City
- Ira Harris, incumbent Senator since 1861

=== Results ===
The caucus of Republican State legislators met on January 10, State Senator Charles J. Folger presided. State Senator Thomas Parsons (28th D.) was absent, but had his vote cast by proxy. They nominated Congressman Roscoe Conkling for the U.S. Senate. The incumbent Senator Ira Harris was voted down.

1867 Republican caucus for United States Senator result
Candidate	Informal ballot	First ballot	Second ballot	Third ballot	Fourth ballot	Fifth ballot
Roscoe Conkling	33	39	45	53		59
Noah Davis	30	41	44	50		49
Ira Harris	32	24	18	6		
Ransom Balcom	7	4	2	wd		
Horace Greeley	6	wd				
Charles J. Folger	1	1				1

Notes:

- On the fourth ballot, 110 votes were cast, one too many, and it was annulled.
- "wd" = name withdrawn

== Democratic caucus ==
=== Candidates ===
- A. Oakey Hall, New York County District Attorney
- Henry Cruse Murphy, State Senator and former U.S. Representative and mayor of Brooklyn

=== Results ===
The caucus of the Democratic State legislators met also on January 10. State Senator Henry C. Murphy was nominated on the first ballot with 25 votes against 21 for Ex-D.A. of New York A. Oakey Hall.

== Result ==
Roscoe Conkling was the choice of both the Assembly and the State Senate, and was declared elected.

1867 United States Senator election result
House	Republican		Democratic		Democratic	
State Senate (32 members)	Roscoe Conkling	24	Henry C. Murphy	2	George F. Comstock	1
State Assembly (128 members)	Roscoe Conkling	78	Henry C. Murphy	42		

Notes:

- The vote for Ex-Chief Judge Comstock was cast by Henry C. Murphy.
- The votes were cast on January 15, but both Houses met in a joint session on January 16 to compare nominations, and declare the result.

== Aftermath ==
Conkling was re-elected in 1873 and 1879, and remained in office until May 17, 1881, when he resigned in protest against the distribution of federal patronage in New York by President James A. Garfield without being consulted. The crisis between the Stalwart and the Half-Breed factions of the Republican party arose when the leader of the New Yorker Half-Breeds William H. Robertson was appointed Collector of the Port of New York, a position Conkling wanted to give to one of his Stalwart friends.

== See also ==
- United States Senate elections, 1866 and 1867

== Sources ==
- The New York Civil List compiled by Franklin Benjamin Hough, Stephen C. Hutchins and Edgar Albert Werner, 1867 (see pg. 568 for U. S. Senators; pg. 444 for State Senators 1867; pg. 505f for Members of Assembly 1867)
- Members of the 40th United States Congress
- Result state election 1865 in The Tribune Almanac for 1866 compiled by Horace Greeley of the New York Tribune
- Result state election 1866 in The Tribune Almanac for 1867 compiled by Horace Greeley of the New York Tribune
- ...THE REPUBLICAN CAUCUS; Hon. Roscoe Conkling, of Oneida County, Nominated for United States Senator; ...DEMOCRATIC CAUCUS; Hon. Henry C. Murphy, of Kings County, Nominated for United States Senator in NYT on January 11, 1867
- Journal of the New York State Assembly (1867; pages 98f and 103)
- Journal of the New York State Senate (1867; pages 58f and 62)
