= C. Pope Caldwell =

American politician (1875–1940)

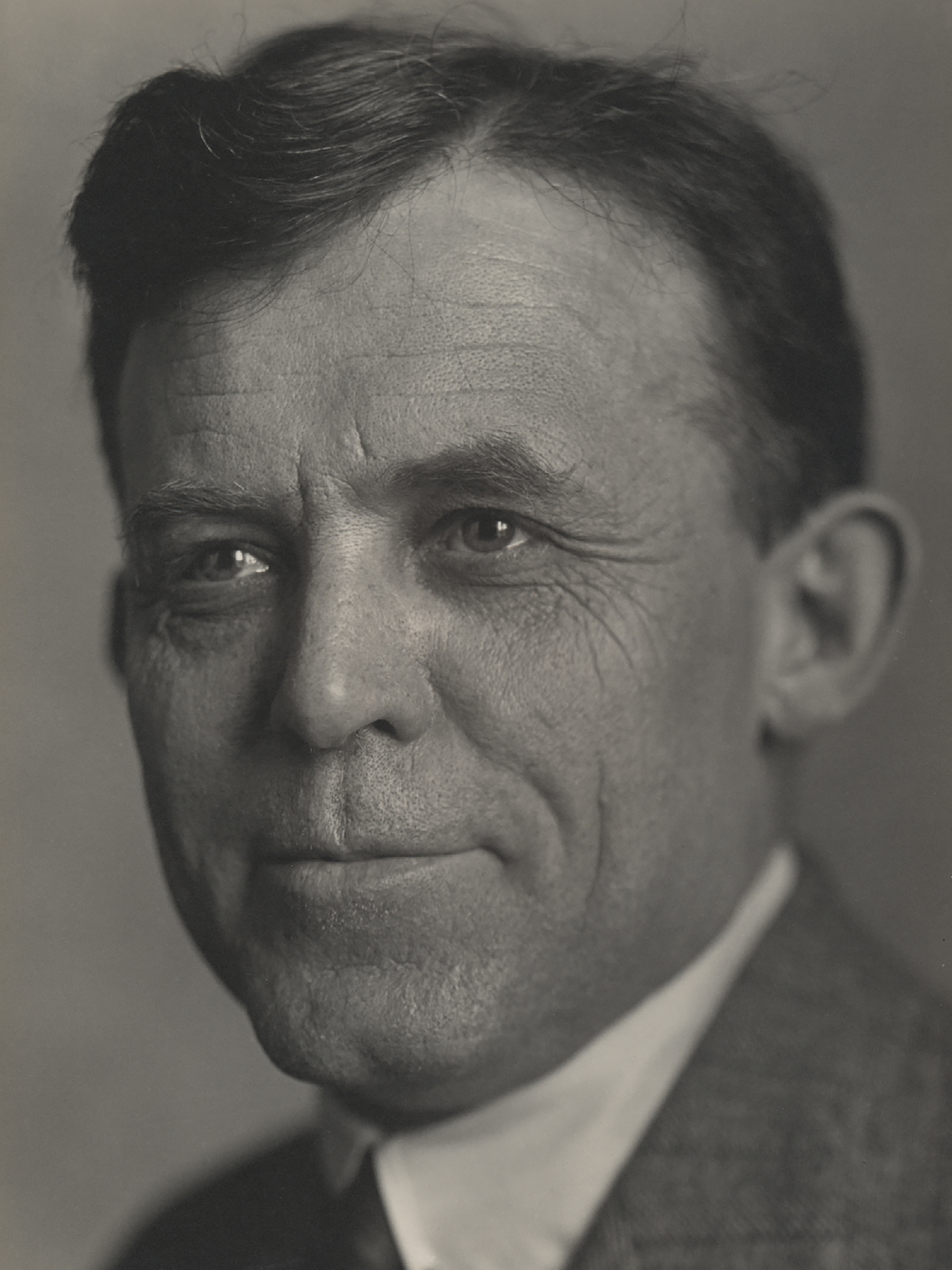
- Caldwell, c. 1915

Member of the U.S. House of Representatives from New York's 2nd district
- In office March 4, 1915 – March 3, 1921
- Preceded by: Denis O'Leary
- Succeeded by: John J. Kindred

Personal details
- Born: Charles Pope Caldwell; June 18, 1875 Bastrop, Texas, U.S.
- Died: July 31, 1940 (aged 65) Queens, New York, U.S.
- Party: Democratic Party
- Spouse: Frances Morrison
- Education: University of Texas Law School; Yale Law School
- Occupation: Attorney; Judge

Charles Pope Caldwell (June 18, 1875 - July 31, 1940) was an American lawyer and politician who served three terms as a U.S. representative from New York from 1915 to 1921.

== Biography ==
Born near Bastrop, Texas, Caldwell attended the public schools. He graduated from the University of Texas Law School in 1898 and from Yale Law School in 1899. He was admitted to the bar in Austin, Texas, in 1898, and later in New York City, where he commenced practice in 1900.

=== Political career ===
He was appointed by Governor John Alden Dix a delegate to the Atlantic Deeper Water Ways Convention in 1910. He served as delegate to the Democratic National Convention in 1912.

=== Congress ===
Caldwell was elected as a Democrat to the Sixty-fourth, Sixty-fifth, and Sixty-sixth Congresses (March 4, 1915 – March 3, 1921). He declined to be a candidate for renomination in 1920. He resumed the practice of law in New York City.

=== Later career and death ===
He was appointed associate justice of the court of special sessions of New York City January 1, 1926, and served until December 1935. He resumed the practice of law on Long Island. He died in Sunnyside, Queens, on July 31, 1940. His remains were cremated and the ashes scattered over his ancestral estate in Bastrop County, Texas.

U.S. House of Representatives
| Preceded by Denis O'Leary | Member of the U.S. House of Representatives from New York's 2nd congressional district 1915–1921 | Succeeded by John J. Kindred |
