= James De La Montanya =

American politician

Member of the U.S. House of Representatives from New York's 2nd district
- In office March 4, 1839 – March 3, 1841
- Preceded by: Abraham Vanderveer
- Succeeded by: Joseph Egbert

New York State Assembly
- In office 1833

Personal details
- Born: March 20, 1798 New York City, New York
- Died: April 29, 1849 (aged 51) New York City, New York
- Party: Democratic

James De La Montanya (March 20, 1798 – April 29, 1849) was an American politician who served one term as a U.S. representative from New York from 1839 to 1841,

== Biography ==
Born in New York City, De La Montanya resided in Haverstraw, New York. Supervisor of Haverstraw in 1832 and 1833. He served as member of the State assembly in 1833.

=== Congress ===
De La Montanya was elected as a Democrat to the Twenty-sixth Congress (March 4, 1839 – March 3, 1841).

=== Death ===
He died in New York City April 29, 1849. He was interred in the Barnes family burial ground, Stony Point, New York.

U.S. House of Representatives
Preceded by Abraham Vanderveer	Member of the U.S. House of Representatives from New York's 2nd congressional district 1839–1841	Succeeded by Joseph Egbert
