= Daniel O'Reilly (politician) =

American politician

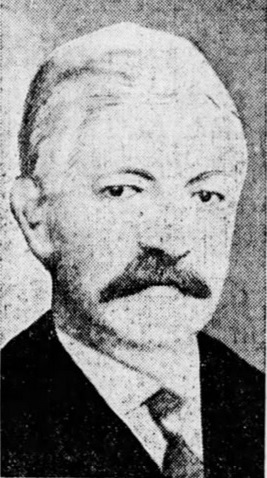
Daniel O'Reilly, New York Congressman

Daniel O'Reilly (June 3, 1838 – September 23, 1911) was a U.S. representative from New York from 1879 to 1881.

== Biography ==
He was born in Limerick, Ireland and emigrated to the United States in July 1856 with his parents, who settled in Brooklyn, where he was educated. O'Reilly worked in a variety of appointed government positions, including a post as Brooklyn's Weigher, and one in the New York Custom House.

He was a member of the Brooklyn Board of Aldermen from 1873 to 1875, and again in 1878 and 1879, and his service included time as president pro tempore of the board and acting mayor.

O'Reilly was elected as an Independent Democrat to the Forty-sixth Congress (March 4, 1879 - March 3, 1881).

Shortly after the start of his term, O'Reilly was accused of being a deserter from the Union Army, and alleged to have enlisted under false pretenses in order to collect cash bounties paid to new recruits. O'Reilly defended himself by stating that he had in fact enlisted in the 104th New York Volunteer Infantry with the expectation of receiving an officer's commission. He went on to state that after having attained the rank of color sergeant, two companies of the regiment were consolidated, which eliminated vacant officer positions, so he was discharged after three months. O'Reilly also pointed out that he had been detained during the war after he was accused of deserting, but that the local provost marshal released him immediately after determining that the accusation was false and came from the previous holder of a position in the Custom House, who had been replaced by O'Reilly. In addition, O'Reilly gathered affidavits from several Brooklyn residents who attested that they had seen him in uniform at the time of his enlistment, and that they had visited O'Reilly at Camp Scott on Staten Island while he was there with his unit.

He was an unsuccessful candidate for reelection in 1880 to the Forty-seventh Congress. He then studied law, was admitted to the bar in 1888 and commenced practice in Brooklyn.

From 1898 until his death O'Reilly was the head of the Kings County transfer tax department.

O'Reilly died in Bayville on September 23, 1911, with interment at Holy Cross Cemetery in Flatbush.

U.S. House of Representatives
Preceded by William D. Veeder	Member of the U.S. House of Representatives from New York's 2nd congressional district March 4, 1879 – March 3, 1881	Succeeded by William Erigena Robinson
