= Samuel Barton (New York politician) =

American politician

Member of the U.S. House of Representatives from New York's 2nd district
- In office March 4, 1835 – March 3, 1837
- Preceded by: Isaac B. Van Houten
- Succeeded by: Abraham Vanderveer

New York State Assembly
- In office 1821–1822

Personal details
- Born: Samuel Barton; July 27, 1785 New Dorp, New York, US
- Died: January 29, 1858 (aged 72) New Dorp, New York, US
- Resting place: Moravian Cemetery, Staten Island
- Party: Jacksonian
- Spouse: Lydia Rawson Taylor Barton
- Children: Cornelius Vanderbilt Barton
- Profession: Steamship Line agent and politician

Military service
- Branch/service: New York State Militia
- Years of service: 1818–1833
- Rank: major; colonel

Samuel Barton (July 27, 1785 – January 29, 1858) was an American politician and a one-term U.S. representative from New York from 1835 to 1837.

== Biography ==
Barton, a nephew of William H. Vanderbilt, was born in New Dorp, New York on July 27, 1785, the son of Samuel and Jane Vanderbilt Barton, who was the sister of Commodore Vanderbilt. He and attended the common schools, and became an agent for Commodore Cornelius Vanderbilt’s steamship lines. Barton married Lydia Rawson Taylor, and they had one son, Cornelius Vanderbilt Barton.

== Career ==
Having served in the State militia as a major in 1818, Barton was a member of the New York State Assembly from 1821 to 1822. and served on the Andrew Jackson reception committee in 1833. He again served in the State militia as a colonel in 1833.

=== Congress ===
Elected as a Jacksonian to the Twenty-fourth Congress, Barton was a U. S. Representative for the second district of New York from March 4, 1835 to March 3, 1837. He was not a candidate for renomination in 1836.

=== Later career ===
He resumed his former pursuits in the steamship business. He served as director of the Tompkinsville Lyceum.

== Death ==
Barton died in New Dorp, Staten Island, Richmond County, New York, on January 29, 1858 (age 72). He is interred at Moravian Cemetery, New Dorp, Staten Island, New York.

U.S. House of Representatives
Preceded by Isaac B. Van Houten	Member of the U.S. House of Representatives from New York's 2nd congressional district March 4, 1835 – March 3, 1837	Succeeded by Abraham Vanderveer
