= Thomas W. Cumming =

American politician (c. 1814–1855)

Member of the U.S. House of Representatives from New York's 2nd district
- In office March 4, 1853 – March 3, 1855
- Preceded by: Obadiah Bowne
- Succeeded by: James S. T. Stranahan

Personal details
- Born: Thomas William Cumming c. 1814 Frederick, Maryland, US
- Died: October 13, 1855 (aged 41) Brooklyn, New York, US
- Resting place: Green-Wood Cemetery
- Party: Democratic Party

Military service
- Allegiance: United States
- Branch/service: United States Navy
- Years of service: May 19, 1832–February 23, 1841
- Rank: Midshipman

Thomas William Cumming (c. 1814 – October 13, 1855) was an American businessman and politician who served one term as a U.S. representative from New York from 1853 to 1855.

== Early life ==
Born in about 1814 in Frederick, Maryland, Cumming moved to Georgia.

=== Military ===
He was appointed a midshipman in the United States Navy on May 19, 1832. He was promoted to passed midshipman on June 23, 1838, and served until February 23, 1841, when he resigned. While in the Navy he was a member of the Wilkes Expedition in 1838.

=== Pharmacy ===
He moved to Brooklyn, New York. He became a druggist and importer of drugs in New York City and subsequently engaged in mercantile pursuits in Brooklyn, New York from 1843 to 1853.

=== Tenure in Congress ===
Cumming was elected as a Democrat to the Thirty-third Congress (March 4, 1853 – March 3, 1855).

=== Death ===
He died in Brooklyn, New York on October 13, 1855, at the age of 41, suffering from an organic brain syndrome. He was interred in Green-Wood Cemetery.

U.S. House of Representatives
Preceded by Obadiah Bowne	Member of the U.S. House of Representatives from New York's 2nd congressional district 1853–1855	Succeeded by James S. T. Stranahan
