= Henry C. Murphy =

American politician (1810–1882)

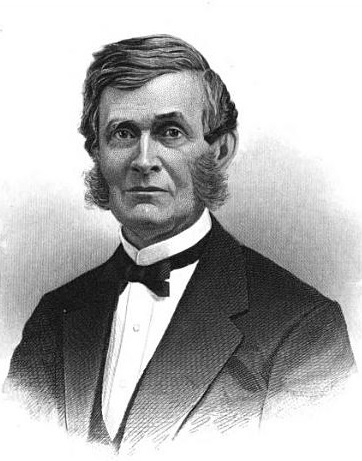

Member of the U.S. House of Representatives from New York's 2nd district
- In office March 4, 1843 – March 3, 1845
- Preceded by: Joseph Egbert
- Succeeded by: Henry J. Seaman
- In office March 4, 1847 – March 3, 1849
- Preceded by: Henry J. Seaman
- Succeeded by: David A. Bokee

Mayor of Brooklyn
- In office 1842–1843
- Preceded by: Cyrus P. Smith
- Succeeded by: Joseph Sprague

U.S. Minister to the Netherlands
- In office 1857–1861
- President: James Buchanan
- Preceded by: August Belmont
- Succeeded by: James Shepherd Pike

New York State Senate (3rd District)
- In office January 1, 1862 – December 31, 1873
- Preceded by: Francis B. Spinola
- Succeeded by: John C. Jacobs

Personal details
- Born: Henry Cruse Murphy; July 5, 1810 Brooklyn, New York
- Died: December 1, 1882 (aged 72) Brooklyn, New York
- Resting place: Green-Wood Cemetery, Brooklyn, New York
- Citizenship: United States
- Party: Democratic
- Spouse: Amelia Greenwood (1813–1887) (m. 1833)
- Children: Henry C. Murphy, Jr. George I. Murphy
- Education: Columbia College
- Profession: Attorney; Newspaper editor Historian; Author

Henry Cruse Murphy (July 5, 1810 – December 1, 1882) was an American lawyer, politician and historian. During his political career, he served as Mayor of Brooklyn, a member of the United States House of Representatives, U.S. Minister to the Netherlands, and member of the New York State Senate.

Murphy was an author and newspaper editor; he founded and was the first editor of the Brooklyn Daily Eagle newspaper, authored monographs on subjects including Henry Hudson's explorations, and translated several Dutch historical works into English.

In addition to his political and literary careers, Murphy was involved in several business ventures in Brooklyn, including railroads and construction of the Brooklyn Bridge.

Murphy died in Brooklyn in 1882 and was buried at Green-Wood Cemetery.

== Early life ==
Henry Cruse Murphy was born in Brooklyn on July 5, 1810. He was the eldest son of John Garrison Murphy and Clarissa Runyon, a New Jersey couple who settled in Brooklyn after their marriage. John Murphy was a prominent businessman, and his accomplishments included inventing and patenting in partnership with another individual a horse-powered wheel for use on East River ferries, which enabled them to change direction for round trips without having to turn around. Henry C. Murphy's grandfather Timothy Murphy was a doctor and an immigrant from Ireland who settled in New Jersey and was a veteran of the American Revolution.

Henry Murphy graduated from Columbia College in 1830, studied law under Judge Peter W. Radcliffe, was admitted to the bar, and practiced in Brooklyn. He was also the first editor of the Brooklyn Eagle and Kings County Democrat newspaper, which launched in 1841.

== Political career ==
Murphy served as Brooklyn's City Attorney and Corporation Counsel, and was Mayor of Brooklyn in 1842 and 1843.

=== Congress ===
In November 1842, prior to completion of his term as mayor of Brooklyn, Murphy was elected to the United States House of Representatives, and he served one term, March 4, 1843, to March 3, 1845 (28th Congress). He was an unsuccessful candidate for reelection in 1844, and served as a delegate to the New York State Constitutional Convention of 1846.

Murphy was returned to Congress in the November 1846 election, serving a second non-consecutive term from March 4, 1847, to March 3, 1849 (30th Congress).

=== After Congress ===
Murphy was a delegate to the 1852 Democratic National Convention. When the convention deadlocked after several ballots on the selection of a presidential nominee, the delegation from Virginia decided to support a dark horse—a northerner whose views on slavery were acceptable to southerners (doughface)—who they intended to vote for as a unit in the hopes of rallying enough delegates around one candidate that he could win the nomination. The Virginia delegates considered Murphy and Franklin Pierce. By one vote they decided to support Pierce, who went on to win the nomination and the presidency.

From 1857 to 1861 Murphy served as Minister to the Netherlands. In 1860 he received the honorary degree of LL.D. from Columbia.

He was a member of the New York State Senate (3rd D.) from 1862 to 1873, sitting in the 85th, 86th, 87th, 88th, 89th, 90th, 91st, 92nd, 93rd, 94th, 95th and 96th New York State Legislatures.

During the American Civil War Murphy opposed secession and supported the Union. He was one of the prominent Brooklyn leaders who recruited and equipped the 3rd Senatorial Regiment, which was mustered into service as the 159th New York Volunteer Infantry Regiment.

Murphy was the Democratic nominee for the U.S. Senate in the 1867 election, but Republicans controlled the state legislature and elected Roscoe Conkling. Murphy cast his ballot for George F. Comstock in the caucus held to choose the Democratic nominee, and again in the full legislative election. In 1867 he also served as a delegate to the state constitutional convention.

In 1868 Murphy was a candidate for the Democratic nomination for Governor of New York, but the Tammany Hall organization and its leader, William M. Tweed, controlled the process and were able to effect the nomination of John T. Hoffman.

Murphy was the choice of Democrats in the legislature for the United States Senate in 1869, but the Republican majority elected Reuben Fenton. In the caucus to decide the Democratic nominee, Murphy cast his ballot for Henry S. Randall, and he voted for Randall again in the election held by the full legislature.

When Fenton's term expired in 1875, Democrats controlled the legislature and Murphy was a candidate, but Francis Kernan won the support of the Democrats in the state legislature and was elected.

== Business career ==
Murphy was active in several business ventures, including president of the Brooklyn, Flatbush and Coney Island Railroad, and member of the board of directors for the Brooklyn City Railroad and the Union Ferry Company.

In 1866 Murphy became active in the effort to construct the Brooklyn Bridge. He was an incorporator of the original venture, the Brooklyn Bridge Company, and served as its president. When the project was converted to a public work, Murphy was elected president of the New York and Brooklyn Bridge Company Board of Trustees, the entity created to plan, oversee construction of, and operate it. He served as president of the board until his death.

== Career as author ==
Murphy was a historian and writer, and is perhaps best known for his research on the early Colonial history of New York. He was a founder of the Long Island Historical Society and the Brooklyn City Library. He translated David Pietersz. de Vries' Voyages from Holland to America 1632 to 1644 (1853) and Jasper Danckaerts' Journal Of A Voyage To New York In 1679–80.

During his residence at The Hague as American Minister he printed for private distribution two monographs, Henry Hudson in Holland: Origin and Objects of the Voyage which Led to the Discovery of the Hudson River (1859) and Jacob Steendam, Noch Vaster: A Memoir of the First Poet in New Netherlands, with his Poems, Descriptive of the Colony (1861). The latter of these was reprinted in his Anthology of New Netherland: or, Translations from the Early Dutch Poets of New York, with Memoirs of their Lives, issued by the Bradford Club in 1875.

== Death and burial ==
Murphy died in Brooklyn on December 1, 1882, and was buried at Green-Wood Cemetery.

== Family ==
In 1834 Murphy married Amelia Greenwood of Haverstraw, New York. Their children included Henry C. Murphy Jr. and George I. Murphy, both attorneys who practiced in partnership with their father.

Diplomatic posts
Preceded by August Belmont	U.S. Minister to the Netherlands; 1857–1861	Succeeded by James Shepherd Pike
U.S. House of Representatives
Preceded by Joseph Egbert	Member of the U.S. House of Representatives from New York's 2nd congressional district 1843–1845	Succeeded by Henry J. Seaman
Preceded by Henry J. Seaman	Member of the U.S. House of Representatives from New York's 2nd congressional district 1847–1849	Succeeded by David A. Bokee
New York State Senate
Preceded by Francis B. Spinola	New York State Senate; 3rd District; 1862–1873	Succeeded by John C. Jacobs
