= William Erigena Robinson =

American politician

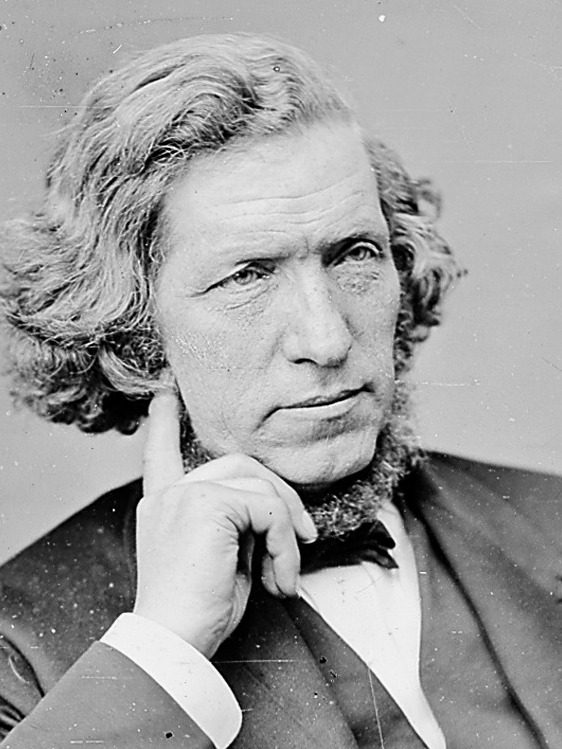

Member of the U.S. House of Representatives from New York
- In office March 4, 1881 – March 3, 1885
- Preceded by: Daniel O'Reilly
- Succeeded by: Felix Campbell
- Constituency: 2nd district
- In office March 4, 1867 – March 3, 1869
- Preceded by: John W. Hunter
- Succeeded by: Henry W. Slocum
- Constituency: 3rd district

Personal details
- Born: May 6, 1814 near Cookstown, County Tyrone, Ireland, U.K.
- Died: January 23, 1892 (aged 77) Brooklyn, New York, U.S.
- Education: Belfast College
- Alma mater: Yale College

William Erigena Robinson (May 6, 1814 – January 23, 1892), often referred to by his pseudonym Richelieu, was an Irish-American journalist and politician from New York.

He represented Brooklyn in the United States House of Representatives for a total of three terms, serving from 1867 to 1869 and again from 1881 to 1885.

== Early life and education ==
William Erigena Robinson was born in Unagh, near Cookstown, County Tyrone on the island of Ireland (the entirety of which was then part of the U.K.).

Robinson attended the classical school in Cookstown and Belfast College in 1834. Robinson emigrated to the United States and settled in New York City in November 1836.

He graduated from Yale College in 1841 and lectured for two years with the Yale Law School.

== Journalist and lawyer ==
In 1843, Robinson served as assistant editor of the New York Tribune in 1843 and its only Washington correspondent, writing under the name of "Richelieu".

Robinson also wrote Washington correspondence for other papers. He was admitted to the New York bar in 1854 and practiced law in New York City.

== Politics ==
He was appointed by President Lincoln assessor of internal revenue for the third district of New York in 1862.

=== Congress ===
In 1866, Robinson was elected to represent Downtown Brooklyn in the United States House of Representatives, defeating Republican Simeon B. Chittenden.

After his term in Congress ended, he resumed the practice of law in 1869.

He ran for Congress as an independent Democrat in 1872 but finished third.

In 1880, he was again nominated by the Democratic Party and defeated incumbent Daniel O'Reilly, an independent Democrat. He was re-elected in 1882. He completed his term in 1885 and ran twice more, first as an independent Democrat in 1888 and then as a Republican in 1890. He was not successful.

== Death ==
Robinson died in Brooklyn on January 23, 1892. He was interred in Greenwood Cemetery.

U.S. House of Representatives
Preceded by John W. Hunter	Member of the U.S. House of Representatives from New York's 3rd congressional district 1867–1869	Succeeded by Henry Warner Slocum
Preceded by Daniel O'Reilly	Member of the U.S. House of Representatives from New York's 2nd congressional district 1881–1885	Succeeded by Felix Campbell
