= Obadiah Bowne =

American politician

Member of the U.S. House of Representatives from New York's 2nd district
- In office March 4, 1851 – March 3, 1853
- Preceded by: David A. Bokee
- Succeeded by: Thomas W. Cumming

Personal details
- Born: May 19, 1822 Staten Island, New York, United States
- Died: April 27, 1874 (aged 51) Richmond Village, New York, US
- Resting place: St. Andrew's Cemetery, Staten Island
- Party: Whig; Republican
- Education: Princeton College
- Profession: Attorney

Obadiah Bowne (May 19, 1822 – April 27, 1874) was a 19th-century American politician who served one term as a United States representative from New York from 1851 to 1853.

== Biography ==
Born in Staten Island, New York, Bowne attended private schools, and was a student at Princeton College from 1838 to 1840.

Bowne's collateral ancestor was John Bowne, pioneer of North American religious liberty.

== Career ==
Bowne held several local offices.

=== Congress ===
Elected as a Whig to the Thirty-second Congress Bowne served as a United States representative for the second district of New York from March 4, 1851, to March 3, 1853. He declined to be a candidate for renomination in 1852.

=== Later career ===
He was quarantine commissioner from 1857 to 1859. He was a presidential elector on the Republican ticket in 1864.

== Death ==
Bowne died in Richmond Village, Staten Island, New York, on April 27, 1874 (age 51 years, 343 days). He is interred at St. Andrew's Cemetery, Staten Island, New York.

U.S. House of Representatives
Preceded by David A. Bokee	Member of the U.S. House of Representatives from New York's 2nd congressional district March 4, 1851 – March 3, 1853	Succeeded by Thomas W. Cumming
