= Thomas Kinsella (politician) =

American politician

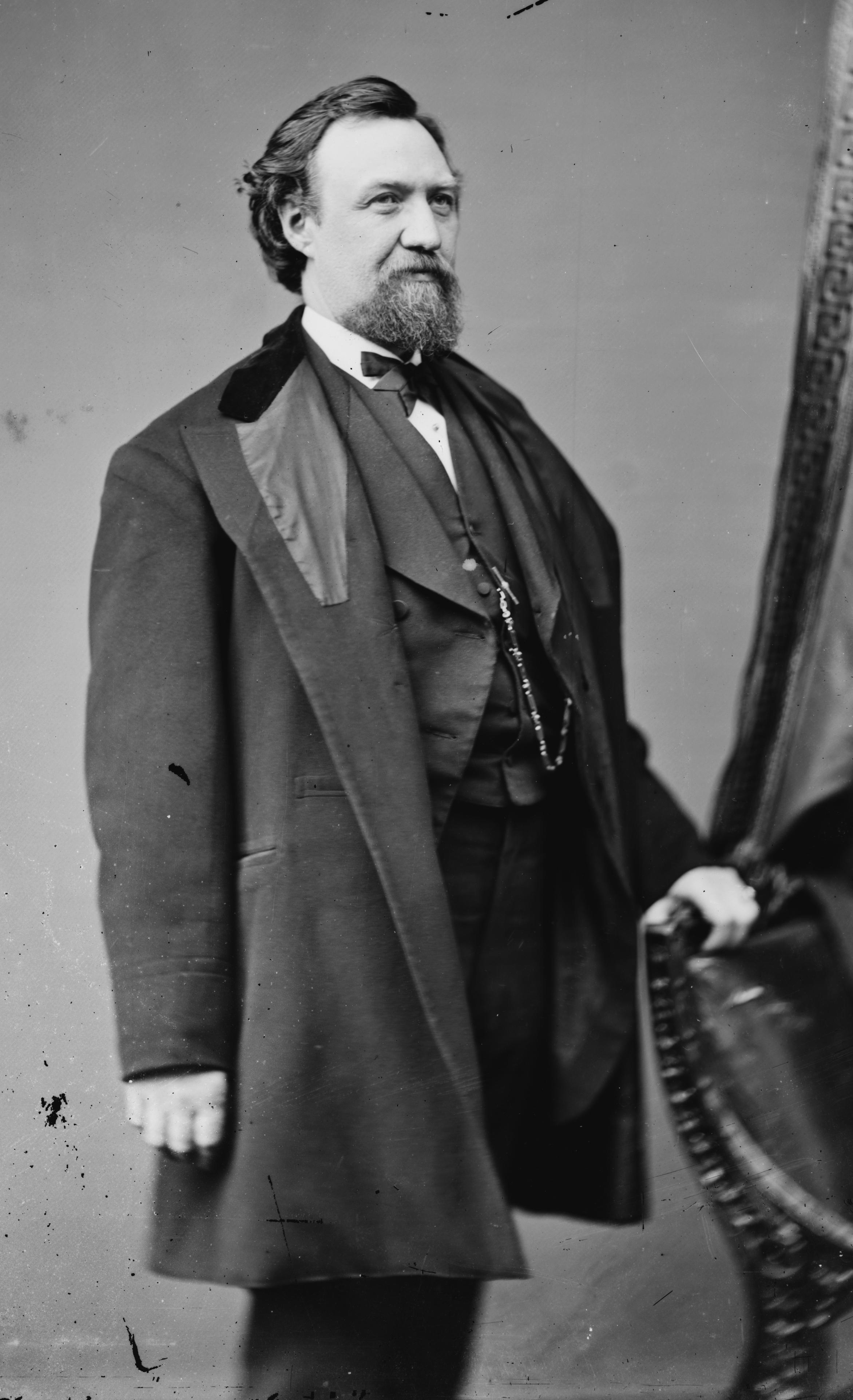

Member of the U.S. House of Representatives from New York's 2nd district
- In office March 4, 1871 – March 3, 1873
- Preceded by: John G. Schumaker
- Succeeded by: John G. Schumaker

Personal details
- Born: December 31, 1832 County Wexford, Ireland
- Died: February 11, 1884 (aged 51) Brooklyn, New York
- Resting place: Holy Cross Cemetery
- Party: Democratic
- Occupation: Printer

Thomas Kinsella (December 31, 1832 – February 11, 1884) was an American printer and politician who served one term as a United States representative from New York from 1871 to 1873.

== Biography ==
Born in County Wexford, Ireland. Brother of Matthew Kinsella born in Kilnahue, Gorey, County Wexford 1836. He emigrated to the United States and settled in New York City, where he attended the common schools.

=== Career ===
He moved to Cambridge, New York, in 1851 and learned the printer's trade; he worked for the Cambridge Post, and moved to Brooklyn in 1858, becoming editor of the Brooklyn Daily Eagle on September 7, 1861. He was postmaster of Brooklyn in 1866, and was a member of the city water commission and board of education.

=== Congress ===
Kinsella was elected as a Democrat to the Forty-second Congress, holding office from March 4, 1871, to March 3, 1873. He was not a candidate for renomination in 1872.

=== Later career and death ===
He established the Brooklyn Sunday Sun in 1874; it afterward combined with the Daily Eagle, which he edited until his death in Brooklyn, 1884.

He was interred in Holy Cross Cemetery.

U.S. House of Representatives
Preceded by John G. Schumaker	Member of the U.S. House of Representatives from New York's 2nd congressional district 1871–1873	Succeeded by John G. Schumaker
