= Joseph Egbert =

American politician

Member of the U.S. House of Representatives from 's 2nd district
- In office March 4, 1841 – March 3, 1843
- Preceded by: James De La Montanya
- Succeeded by: Henry C. Murphy

Personal details
- Born: April 10, 1807 Staten Island, New York City, U.S.
- Died: July 7, 1888 (aged 81) New Dorp, New York City, U.S.
- Party: Democratic

Joseph Egbert (April 10, 1807 – July 7, 1888) was an American farmer and politician who served one term as a U.S. representative from New York from 1841 to 1843.

== Biography ==
Born near Bull Head, Staten Island, New York, Egbert attended the common schools. He engaged in agricultural pursuits.

=== Congress ===
Egbert was elected as a Democrat to the Twenty-seventh Congress (March 4, 1841 – March 3, 1843). He was not a candidate for renomination in 1842.

=== Later career and death ===
He resumed agricultural pursuits. Supervisor of Southfield, Richmond County, in 1855 and 1856. County clerk of Richmond County in 1869. He died at his home near New Dorp, New York, July 7, 1888. He was interred in the Moravian Cemetery, New Dorp, Staten Island, New York.

U.S. House of Representatives
Preceded by James De La Montanya	Member of the U.S. House of Representatives from New York's 2nd congressional district 1841–1843	Succeeded by Henry C. Murphy
