= Henry J. Seaman =

American politician (1805–1861)

Member of the U.S. House of Representatives from New York's 2nd district
- In office March 4, 1845 – March 3, 1847
- Preceded by: Henry C. Murphy
- Succeeded by: Henry C. Murphy

Personal details
- Born: Henry John Seaman; April 16, 1805 New York City, U.S.
- Died: May 3, 1861 (aged 56) New York City, U.S.
- Resting place: Woodlawn Cemetery, New York City, U.S.
- Party: American
- Profession: Politician

Henry John Seaman (April 16, 1805 – May 3, 1861) was a 19th-century American politician who served one term as a U.S. representative from New York from 1845 to 1847.

== Biography ==
He was born on April 16, 1805, in Greenridge, Staten Island. Seaman engaged in agricultural pursuits. Promoter of Richmond village in 1836.

=== Career ===
Seaman was elected as the candidate of the American Party to the Twenty-ninth Congress (March 4, 1845 – March 3, 1847). He served as director of the Staten Island Railroad in 1851. Secretary of the Plank Road Co. in 1856. Constructed the bridge over Fresh Kills.

=== Death and burial ===
He died at Marshland, Staten Island on May 3, 1861. He was interred in Woodlawn Cemetery, New York City.

U.S. House of Representatives
Preceded by Henry C. Murphy	Member of the U.S. House of Representatives from New York's 2nd congressional district 1845–1847	Succeeded by Henry C. Murphy
