= New York's 2nd congressional district =

U.S. House district for New York

- Interactive map of district boundaries since January 3, 2025
- Representative: Andrew Garbarino; R–Bayport
- Distribution: 99.89% urban; 0.11% rural
- Population (2025): 787,038
- Median household income: $123,934
- Ethnicity: 56.4% White; 27.3% Hispanic; 9.5% Black; 3.3% Asian; 2.5% Two or more races; 0.9% other
- Cook PVI: R+6

New York's 2nd congressional district is a congressional district for the United States House of Representatives along the South Shore of Long Island, New York. It includes southwestern Suffolk County and a small portion of southeastern Nassau County. The district is currently represented by Republican Andrew Garbarino.

From 2003 to 2013 it included all of the town of Huntington and parts of the towns of Babylon, Islip and Smithtown in Suffolk County as well as part of the town of Oyster Bay in Nassau County. It comprised such communities as Bay Shore, Brentwood, Central Islip, Commack, Deer Park, Dix Hills, Huntington, Melville, North Amityville, Northport, Oakdale, Plainview, Ronkonkoma, Sayville and Wyandanch. Much of this area is now the 3rd congressional district, while most of the territory currently in the 2nd district was located in the 3rd district.

According to the APM Research Lab's Voter Profile Tools (featuring the U.S. Census Bureau's 2019 American Community Survey), the district contained about 512,000 potential voters (citizens, age 18+). Of these, 68% are White, 17% Latino, and 10% Black. Immigrants make up 15% of the district's potential voters. The median income among households (with one or more potential voter) in the district is about $109,400. As for the educational attainment of potential voters in the district, 32% hold a bachelor's or higher degree.

== Voter registration ==
Voter registration and party enrollment as of February 20, 2025
Party	Active voters	Inactive voters	Total voters	Percentage
Democratic	178,494	6,335	184,829	33.81%
Republican	167,319	6,166	173,485	31.74%
Conservative	9,514	381	9,895	1.81%
Working Families	2,203	66	2,269	0.42%
Other	14,724	286	15,010	2.75%
Unaffiliated	155,371	5,800	161,171	29.48%
Total	527,625	19,034	546,659	100%

== Counties and town ==
For the 119th and successive Congresses (based on the districts drawn following the New York Court of Appeals' December 2023 decision in Hoffman v New York State Ind. Redistricting. Commn.), the district contains all or portions of the following counties and towns.

Nassau County (1)

Oyster Bay (part; also 3rd; includes East Massapequa, Massapequa, Massapequa Park, and North Massapequa)

Suffolk County (3)

Babylon, Brookhaven (part; also 1st; includes Bellport, Blue Point, Brookhaven (CDP), East Patchogue, Holbrook, Mastic, Mastic Beach, North Bellport, North Patchogue, Patchogue, Shirley, and part of Fire Island (including Fire Island Pines and Cherry Grove), Holbrook, Holtsville, Medford, and Yaphank), Islip

== Recent election results from statewide races ==
Year	Office	Results
2008	President	Obama 53% - 46%
2012	President	Obama 54% - 46%
2016	President	Trump 52% - 44%
2016	Senate	Schumer 61% - 37%
2018	Senate	Gillibrand 55% - 45%
2018	Governor	Cuomo 51% - 46%
2018	Attorney General	James 51% - 47%
2020	President	Trump 51% - 48%
2022	Senate	Pinion 58% - 42%
2022	Governor	Zeldin 61% - 39%
2022	Attorney General	Henry 60% - 40%
2022	Comptroller	Rodríguez 57% - 43%
2024	President	Trump 56% - 43%
2024	Senate	Sapraicone 55% - 45%

== List of members representing the district ==
=== 1789–1805: one seat ===
Representative	Party	Years	Cong ress	Electoral history
District established March 4, 1789
John Laurance (New York)	Pro-Administration	March 4, 1789 – March 3, 1793	1st 2nd	Elected in 1789. Re-elected in 1790. Retired.
John Watts (New York)	Pro-Administration	March 4, 1793 – March 3, 1795	3rd	Elected in 1793. Lost re-election.
Edward Livingston (New York)	Democratic- Republican	March 4, 1795 – March 3, 1801	4th 5th 6th	Elected in 1794. Re-elected in 1796. Re-elected in 1798. [data missing]
Samuel L. Mitchill (New York)	Democratic- Republican	March 4, 1801 – March 3, 1803	7th	Elected in 1800. Redistricted to the 3rd district.
Joshua Sands (Brooklyn)	Federalist	March 4, 1803 – March 3, 1805	8th	Elected in 1802. Retired.

=== 1805–1809: two seats on general ticket with 3rd district ===
Gurdon S. Mumford is usually listed as member from the 2nd district, and George Clinton Jr. from the 3rd district, because Clinton was elected to fill the vacancy caused by the election of Mitchill to the U.S. Senate, and Mitchill had been elected previously in the 3rd district. However, in 1804 Mitchill was already re-elected on the 2nd/3rd general ticket, and both Clinton and Mumford were elected in special elections, receiving votes in both districts.

Cong ress	Years	Seat A			Seat B		
Cong ress	Years	Representative	Party	Electoral history	Representative	Party	Electoral history
9th 10th	March 4, 1805 – March 3, 1809	Gurdon S. Mumford (New York)	Democratic- Republican	Daniel D. Tompkins was elected in 1804 but declined the seat when appointed to the New York Supreme Court. Elected to begin Tompkins's term. Re-elected in 1806.	George Clinton Jr. (New York)	Democratic- Republican	Samuel L. Mitchill (previously of the 3rd district) was re-elected in 1804 but resigned November 22, 1804 when elected U.S. Senator. Elected to begin Mitchell's term. Re-elected in 1806. The districts were separated again, and a second seat was added to the 2nd district.

The districts were separated in 1809.

=== 1809–1823: two seats ===
From 1809 to 1823, two seats were apportioned to the second district, elected at-large on a general ticket.

Cong ress	Years	Seat A			Seat B		
Cong ress	Years	Representative	Party	Electoral history	Representative	Party	Electoral history
11th	March 4, 1809 – 1810	Gurdon S. Mumford (New York)	Democratic-Republican	Re-elected in 1808. [data missing]	William Denning (New York)	Democratic-Republican	Elected in 1808. Never took his seat resigned.
11th	1810 – December 4, 1810	Gurdon S. Mumford (New York)	Democratic-Republican	Re-elected in 1808. [data missing]	Vacant		
11th	December 4, 1810 – March 3, 1811	Gurdon S. Mumford (New York)	Democratic-Republican	Re-elected in 1808. [data missing]	Samuel L. Mitchill (New York)	Democratic-Republican	Elected April 24–26, 1810 to finish Denning's term and seated December 4, 1810. Also elected the same day in 1810 to the next term. [data missing]
12th	March 4, 1811 – March 3, 1813	William Paulding Jr. (New York)	Democratic-Republican	Elected in 1810. [data missing]	Samuel L. Mitchill (New York)	Democratic-Republican	Elected April 24–26, 1810 to finish Denning's term and seated December 4, 1810. Also elected the same day in 1810 to the next term. [data missing]
13th	March 4, 1813 – August 2, 1813	Egbert Benson (New York)	Federalist	Elected in 1812. Resigned.	Jotham Post Jr.(New York)	Federalist	Elected in 1812. [data missing]
13th	August 2, 1813 – January 22, 1814	Vacant			Jotham Post Jr.(New York)	Federalist	Elected in 1812. [data missing]
13th	January 22, 1814 – March 3, 1815	William Irving (New York)	Democratic-Republican	Elected December 28–30, 1813 to finish Benson's term and was seated January 22, 1814. Re-elected in 1814. Re-elected in 1816. [data missing]	Jotham Post Jr.(New York)	Federalist	Elected in 1812. [data missing]
14th	March 4, 1815 – March 3, 1817	William Irving (New York)	Democratic-Republican	Elected December 28–30, 1813 to finish Benson's term and was seated January 22, 1814. Re-elected in 1814. Re-elected in 1816. [data missing]	Peter H. Wendover (New York)	Democratic-Republican	Elected in 1814. Re-elected in 1816. Re-elected in 1818. [data missing]
15th	March 4, 1817 – March 3, 1819	William Irving (New York)	Democratic-Republican	Elected December 28–30, 1813 to finish Benson's term and was seated January 22, 1814. Re-elected in 1814. Re-elected in 1816. [data missing]	Peter H. Wendover (New York)	Democratic-Republican	Elected in 1814. Re-elected in 1816. Re-elected in 1818. [data missing]
16th	March 4, 1819 – March 3, 1821	Henry Meigs (New York)	Democratic-Republican	Elected in 1818. [data missing]	Peter H. Wendover (New York)	Democratic-Republican	Elected in 1814. Re-elected in 1816. Re-elected in 1818. [data missing]
17th	March 4, 1821 – December 3, 1821	Elections were held in April 1821. It is unclear when results were announced or credentials issued.					
17th	December 3, 1821 – March 3, 1823	Churchill C. Cambreleng (New York)	Democratic-Republican	Elected in 1821. Redistricted to the 3rd district.	John J. Morgan (New York)	Democratic-Republican	Elected in 1821. Redistricted to the 3rd district.

=== 1823–present: one seat ===
Member	Party	Years	Cong ress	Electoral history	District location
Jacob Tyson (Castletown)	Democratic-Republican	March 4, 1823 – March 3, 1825	18th	Elected in 1822. [data missing]	1823–1833; Parts of Kings county
Joshua Sands (Brooklyn)	Anti-Jacksonian	March 4, 1825 – March 3, 1827	19th	Elected in 1824. [data missing]	1823–1833; Parts of Kings county
John J. Wood (Huntington)	Jacksonian	March 4, 1827 – March 3, 1829	20th	Elected in 1826. Retired.	1823–1833; Parts of Kings county
Jacob Crocheron (Smithfield)	Jacksonian	March 4, 1829 – March 3, 1831	21st	Elected in 1828. [data missing]	1823–1833; Parts of Kings county
John T. Bergen (Brooklyn)	Jacksonian	March 4, 1831 – March 3, 1833	22nd	Elected in 1830. [data missing]	1823–1833; Parts of Kings county
Isaac B. Van Houten (Clarkstown)	Jacksonian	March 4, 1833 – March 3, 1835	23rd	Elected in 1832. [data missing]	1833–1843; Parts of Kings county
Samuel Barton (Richmond)	Jacksonian	March 4, 1835 – March 3, 1837	24th	Elected in 1834. [data missing]	1833–1843; Parts of Kings county
Abraham Vanderveer (Brooklyn)	Democratic	March 4, 1837 – March 3, 1839	25th	Elected in 1836. [data missing]	1833–1843; Parts of Kings county
James De la Montanya (Haverstraw)	Democratic	March 4, 1839 – March 3, 1841	26th	Elected in 1838. [data missing]	1833–1843; Parts of Kings county
Joseph Egbert (Tompkinsville)	Democratic	March 4, 1841 – March 3, 1843	27th	Elected in 1840. [data missing]	1833–1843; Parts of Kings county
Henry C. Murphy (Brooklyn)	Democratic	March 4, 1843 – March 3, 1845	28th	Elected in 1842. [data missing]	1843–1853; Parts of Kings county
Henry J. Seaman (Richmond)	Know Nothing	March 4, 1845 – March 3, 1847	29th	Elected in 1844. [data missing]	1843–1853; Parts of Kings county
Henry C. Murphy (Brooklyn)	Democratic	March 4, 1847 – March 3, 1849	30th	Elected in 1846. [data missing]	1843–1853; Parts of Kings county
David A. Bokee (Brooklyn)	Whig	March 4, 1849 – March 3, 1851	31st	Elected in 1848. [data missing]	1843–1853; Parts of Kings county
Obadiah Bowne (Richmond)	Whig	March 4, 1851 – March 3, 1853	32nd	Elected in 1850. [data missing]	1843–1853; Parts of Kings county
Thomas W. Cumming (Brooklyn)	Democratic	March 4, 1853 – March 3, 1855	33rd	Elected in 1852. [data missing]	1853–1863; Parts of Kings county
James S.T. Stranahan (Brooklyn)	Opposition	March 4, 1855 – March 3, 1857	34th	Elected in 1854. [data missing]	1853–1863; Parts of Kings county
George Taylor (Brooklyn)	Democratic	March 4, 1857 – March 3, 1859	35th	Elected in 1856. [data missing]	1853–1863; Parts of Kings county
James Humphrey (Brooklyn)	Republican	March 4, 1859 – March 3, 1861	36th	Elected in 1858. [data missing]	1853–1863; Parts of Kings county
Moses F. Odell (Brooklyn)	Democratic	March 4, 1861 – March 3, 1863	37th	Elected in 1860. [data missing]	1853–1863; Parts of Kings county
Martin Kalbfleisch (Brooklyn)	Democratic	March 4, 1863 – March 3, 1865	38th	Elected in 1862. [data missing]	1863–1873; Parts of Kings county
Teunis G. Bergen (New Utrecht)	Democratic	March 4, 1865 – March 3, 1867	39th	Elected in 1864. [data missing]	1863–1873; Parts of Kings county
Demas Barnes (Brooklyn)	Democratic	March 4, 1867 – March 3, 1869	40th	Elected in 1866. [data missing]	1863–1873; Parts of Kings county
John G. Schumaker (Brooklyn)	Democratic	March 4, 1869 – March 3, 1871	41st	Elected in 1868. [data missing]	1863–1873; Parts of Kings county
Thomas Kinsella (Brooklyn)	Democratic	March 4, 1871 – March 3, 1873	42nd	Elected in 1870. [data missing]	1863–1873; Parts of Kings county
John G. Schumaker (Brooklyn)	Democratic	March 4, 1873 – March 3, 1877	43rd 44th	Elected in 1872. Re-elected in 1874. [data missing]	1873–1883; Parts of Kings county
William D. Veeder (Brooklyn)	Democratic	March 4, 1877 – March 3, 1879	45th	Elected in 1876. [data missing]	1873–1883; Parts of Kings county
Daniel O'Reilly (Brooklyn)	Democratic	March 4, 1879 – March 3, 1881	46th	Elected in 1878. [data missing]	1873–1883; Parts of Kings county
William E. Robinson (Brooklyn)	Democratic	March 4, 1881 – March 3, 1885	47th 48th	Elected in 1880. Re-elected in 1882. [data missing]	1873–1883; Parts of Kings county
William E. Robinson (Brooklyn)	Democratic	March 4, 1881 – March 3, 1885	47th 48th	Elected in 1880. Re-elected in 1882. [data missing]	1883–1885; Parts of Kings county
Felix Campbell (Brooklyn)	Democratic	March 4, 1885 – March 3, 1891	49th 50th 51st	Redistricted from the 4th district and re-elected in 1884. Re-elected in 1886. Re-elected in 1888. [data missing]	1885–1893; Kings County (partial)
David A. Boody (Brooklyn)	Democratic	March 4, 1891 – October 13, 1891	52nd	Elected in 1890. Resigned to become railroad commissioner of New York State.	1885–1893; Kings County (partial)
Vacant		October 13, 1891 – November 3, 1891	52nd		1885–1893; Kings County (partial)
Alfred C. Chapin (Brooklyn)	Democratic	November 3, 1891 – November 16, 1892	52nd	Elected to finish Boody's term. Resigned.	1885–1893; Kings County (partial)
Vacant		November 16, 1892 – March 3, 1893	52nd		1885–1893; Kings County (partial)
John M. Clancy (Brooklyn)	Democratic	March 4, 1893 – March 3, 1895	53rd	Redistricted from the 4th district and re-elected in 1892. [data missing]	1893–1903; Kings County (partial)
Denis M. Hurley (Brooklyn)	Republican	March 4, 1895 – February 26, 1899	54th 55th	Elected in 1894. Re-elected in 1896. Died.	1893–1903; Kings County (partial)
Vacant		February 26, 1899 – March 3, 1899	55th		1893–1903; Kings County (partial)
John J. Fitzgerald (Brooklyn)	Democratic	March 4, 1899 – March 3, 1903	56th 57th	Elected in 1898. Re-elected in 1900. Redistricted to the 7th district.	1893–1903; Kings County (partial)
George H. Lindsay (Brooklyn)	Democratic	March 4, 1903 – March 3, 1913	58th 59th 60th 61st 62nd	Redistricted from the 6th district and re-elected in 1902. Re-elected in 1904. Re-elected in 1906. Re-elected in 1908. Re-elected in 1910. [data missing]	1903–1913; Kings County (partial)
Denis O'Leary (Queens)	Democratic	March 4, 1913 – December 31, 1914	63rd	Elected in 1912. Resigned.	1913–1933; Parts of Queens county
Vacant		December 31, 1914 – March 3, 1915	63rd		1913–1933; Parts of Queens county
C. Pope Caldwell (Queens)	Democratic	March 4, 1915 – March 3, 1921	64th 65th 66th	Elected in 1914. Re-elected in 1916. Re-elected in 1918. [data missing]	1913–1933; Parts of Queens county
John J. Kindred (Queens)	Democratic	March 4, 1921 – March 3, 1929	67th 68th 69th 70th	Elected in 1920. Re-elected in 1922. Re-elected in 1924. Re-elected in 1926. [data missing]	1913–1933; Parts of Queens county
William F. Brunner (Queens)	Democratic	March 4, 1929 – September 27, 1935	71st 72nd 73rd 74th	Elected in 1928. Re-elected in 1930. Re-elected in 1932. Re-elected in 1934. Resigned upon election as sheriff of Queens County.	1913–1933; Parts of Queens county
William F. Brunner (Queens)	Democratic	March 4, 1929 – September 27, 1935	71st 72nd 73rd 74th	Elected in 1928. Re-elected in 1930. Re-elected in 1932. Re-elected in 1934. Resigned upon election as sheriff of Queens County.	1933–1945; Parts of Queens county
Vacant		September 27, 1935 – November 5, 1935	74th		1933–1945; Parts of Queens county
William B. Barry (Queens)	Democratic	November 5, 1935 – January 3, 1945	74th 75th 76th 77th 78th	Elected to finish Brunner's term. Re-elected in 1936. Re-elected in 1938. Re-elected in 1940. Re-elected in 1942. Redistricted to the 4th district.	1933–1945; Parts of Queens county
Leonard W. Hall (Oyster Bay)	Republican	January 3, 1945 – December 31, 1952	79th 80th 81st 82nd	Redistricted from the 1st district and re-elected in 1944. Re-elected in 1946. Re-elected in 1948. Re-elected in 1950. Resigned to become Chairman of the Republican National Committee.	1945–1953; Parts of Nassau county
Vacant		December 31, 1952 – January 3, 1953	82nd		1945–1953; Parts of Nassau county
Steven Derounian (Roslyn)	Republican	January 3, 1953 – January 3, 1963	83rd 84th 85th 86th 87th	Elected in 1952. Re-elected in 1954. Re-elected in 1956. Re-elected in 1958. Re-elected in 1960. Redistricted to the 3rd district.	1953–1963; Parts of Nassau county
James R. Grover Jr. (Babylon)	Republican	January 3, 1963 – January 3, 1975	88th 89th 90th 91st 92nd 93rd	Elected in 1962. Re-elected in 1964. Re-elected in 1966. Re-elected in 1968. Re-elected in 1970. Re-elected in 1972. Lost re-election.	1963–1973; Parts of Nassau, Suffolk counties
James R. Grover Jr. (Babylon)	Republican	January 3, 1963 – January 3, 1975	88th 89th 90th 91st 92nd 93rd	Elected in 1962. Re-elected in 1964. Re-elected in 1966. Re-elected in 1968. Re-elected in 1970. Re-elected in 1972. Lost re-election.	1973–1983; Parts of Suffolk county
Thomas J. Downey (Amityville)	Democratic	January 3, 1975 – January 3, 1993	94th 95th 96th 97th 98th 99th 100th 101st 102nd	Elected in 1974. Re-elected in 1976. Re-elected in 1978. Re-elected in 1980. Re-elected in 1982. Re-elected in 1984. Re-elected in 1986. Re-elected in 1988. Re-elected in 1990. Lost re-election.	1973–1983; Parts of Suffolk county
Thomas J. Downey (Amityville)	Democratic	January 3, 1975 – January 3, 1993	94th 95th 96th 97th 98th 99th 100th 101st 102nd	Elected in 1974. Re-elected in 1976. Re-elected in 1978. Re-elected in 1980. Re-elected in 1982. Re-elected in 1984. Re-elected in 1986. Re-elected in 1988. Re-elected in 1990. Lost re-election.	1983–1993; Parts of Suffolk county
Rick Lazio (Brightwaters)	Republican	January 3, 1993 – January 3, 2001	103rd 104th 105th 106th	Elected in 1992. Re-elected in 1994. Re-elected in 1996. Re-elected in 1998. Retired to run for U.S. senator.	1993 – 2003; Parts of Suffolk county
Steve Israel (Huntington)	Democratic	January 3, 2001 – January 3, 2013	107th 108th 109th 110th 111th 112th	Elected in 2000. Re-elected in 2002. Re-elected in 2004. Re-elected in 2006. Re-elected in 2008. Re-elected in 2010. Redistricted to the 3rd district.	1993 – 2003; Parts of Suffolk county
Steve Israel (Huntington)	Democratic	January 3, 2001 – January 3, 2013	107th 108th 109th 110th 111th 112th	Elected in 2000. Re-elected in 2002. Re-elected in 2004. Re-elected in 2006. Re-elected in 2008. Re-elected in 2010. Redistricted to the 3rd district.	2003–2013; Parts of Nassau, Suffolk counties
Peter T. King (Seaford)	Republican	January 3, 2013 – January 3, 2021	113th 114th 115th 116th	Redistricted from the 3rd district and re-elected in 2012. Re-elected in 2014. Re-elected in 2016. Re-elected in 2018. Retired.	2013–2023; Parts of Nassau, Suffolk counties
Andrew Garbarino (Bayport)	Republican	January 3, 2021 – present	117th 118th 119th	Elected in 2020. Re-elected in 2022. Re-elected in 2024. Re-elected in 2026.	2013–2023; Parts of Nassau, Suffolk counties
Andrew Garbarino (Bayport)	Republican	January 3, 2021 – present	117th 118th 119th	Elected in 2020. Re-elected in 2022. Re-elected in 2024. Re-elected in 2026.	2023–2025; Parts of Nassau, Suffolk counties
Andrew Garbarino (Bayport)	Republican	January 3, 2021 – present	117th 118th 119th	Elected in 2020. Re-elected in 2022. Re-elected in 2024. Re-elected in 2026.	2025–present Parts of Nassau, Suffolk counties

== Recent election results ==
New York election law allows for fusion voting, where a candidate can run as a member of multiple parties. The pooled vote totals for candidates are listed first, and the split of the votes among the parties they ran as is listed beneath. See below for blank, void, and scattering notes.*

Results 2000–2010
Year	Democrat	Votes	Pct	Republican	Votes	Pct	3rd Party	Party	Votes	Pct
2000	✓ Steve Israel	90,438	48%	Joan B. Johnson	65,880	35%	Robert Walsh	Right to Life	11,224	6%
2000	Democratic	90,438		Republican	65,880		Richard N. Thompson	Conservative	10,824	6%
2000							David A. Bishop		10,266	5%
2000								Independence	7,595	
2000								Green	1,404	
2000								Working Families	1,267	
2002	✓ Steve Israel	85,451	58%	Joseph P. Finley	59,117	40%	John Keenan	Green	1,558	1%
2002	Democratic	75,845		Republican	48,239					
2002	Independence	7,632		Conservative	5,772					
2002	Working Families	1,974		Right to Life	5,106					
2004	✓ Steve Israel	161,593	67%	Richard Hoffmann	80,950	33%				
2004	Democratic	147,197		Republican	72,953					
2004	Independence	9,508		Conservative	7,997					
2004	Working Families	4,888								
2006	✓ Steve Israel	105,276	70%	John W. Bugler	44,212	30%				
2006	Democratic	94,100		Republican	37,671					
2006	Independence	7,443		Conservative	6,541					
2006	Working Families	3,733								
2008	✓ Steve Israel	161,279	67%	Frank J. Stalzer	79,641	33%				
2008	Democratic	143,759		Republican	70,145					
2008	Independence	11,900		Conservative	9,496					
2008	Working Families	5,620								
2010	✓ Steve Israel	94,694	56%	John Gomez	72,115	43%	Anthony Tolda	CST	1,258	1%
2010	Democratic	84,211		Republican	53,747					
2010	Independence	6,353		Conservative	13,525					
2010	Working Families	4,130								
2012	Vivianne Falcone	92,060	41%	✓ Peter T. King	131,091	59%				
2014	Patricia Maher	40,009	28%	✓ Peter T. King	91,701	65%				
2016	Du Wayne Gregory	110,938	38%	✓ Peter T. King	181,506	62%				
2018	Liuba Grechen Shirley	106,996	45%	✓ Peter T. King	122,103	53%				
2018	Democratic	102,977		Republican	107,495					
2018	Women's Equality	1,371		Conservative	11,742					
2018	Working Families	2,648		Independence	2,417					
2020	Jackie Gordon	154,123	46%	✓ Andrew Garbarino	177,353	53%	Harry Burger	Green	3,446	1%

* Blank, void, and write-in candidate ("scattering") notes: In 2000, there were 37,596 BVS votes; in 2002, 14,087; in 2004, 40,937; and in 2006, 14,101. Since 2008, results were separated out, and there were 54,163 blank votes; 10 void ballots; and 12 votes cast for write-in candidates. In 2010, 7,104 were blank votes; 93 were void ballots; and thirty were votes cast for write-in candidates.

== See also ==
- List of United States congressional districts
- New York's congressional delegations
- New York's congressional districts
