= John T. Bergen =

American politician

John Teunis Bergen

Member of the U.S. House of Representatives from New York's 2nd district
- In office March 4, 1831 – March 3, 1833
- Preceded by: Jacob Crocheron
- Succeeded by: Isaac B. Van Houten

Personal details
- Born: 1786 Brooklyn, New York, US
- Died: March 9, 1855 (aged 68–69) Batavia, New York, US
- Party: Jacksonian
- Spouses: Margaret Donald Mcleod Bergen; Maria F. Mcleod Bergen
- Children: 14
- Profession: newspaper owner; politician; farmer

Military service
- Branch/service: New York State Militia
- Years of service: 1812–1815
- Rank: lieutenant; captain
- Battles/wars: War of 1812

John Teunis Bergen (1786 – March 9, 1855) was an American politician who served one term as a United States representative from New York from 1831 to 1833. He was previously a soldier, law enforcement officer, and newspaperman. A member of the prominent Bergen family in Brooklyn, he was one of the last slave owners in New York.

== Biography ==
Born in Gowanus, Brooklyn, Bergen was the son of Teunis Hans and Antje Cornelius Vanderve, and second cousin to Teunis Garret Bergen, U.S. Representative from New York as well as a historian. He married Margaret Donald Mcleod who died in 1814. His second wife was Maria F. Mcleod.

Appointed a lieutenant in the New York State Militia in 1812, Bergen was promoted to captain in 1815 and served in the War of 1812.

=== Early career ===
Bergen was Sheriff of Kings County, New York, from 1821 to 1825 and again from 1828 until 1831 when he resigned. He purchased the Long Island Patriot in 1829, the name of which was subsequently changed to the Brooklyn Advocate, and which ultimately became the Brooklyn Daily Eagle.

=== Congress ===
Elected as a Jacksonian to the twenty-second Congress, Bergen was U. S. Representative for the second district of New York from March 4, 1831, to March 3, 1833. While in the House he was chairman of the Committee on Accounts.

=== Later career and death ===
Not a candidate for renomination in 1832, Bergen engaged in agricultural pursuits near Bay Ridge, New Utrecht (now part of Brooklyn). He moved to Brooklyn and engaged in the grocery business. In 1837, with his sons, he conducted a planing mill in New York City. He moved to Genesee County and engaged in agricultural pursuits.

Bergen died in Batavia, New York, on March 9, 1855 (age about 68 years). He is interred at Batavia Cemetery in Batavia, New York.

== See also ==
- Hans Hansen Bergen

U.S. House of Representatives
| Preceded by Jacob Crocheron | Member of the U.S. House of Representatives from New York's 2nd congressional district March 4, 1831 – March 3, 1833 | Succeeded by Isaac B. Van Houten |
