= John J. Wood =

American politician (1784–1874)

John Jacob Wood
- Born: February 16, 1784; Clarkstown, Rockland County, New York
- Died: May 20, 1874 (aged 90); New City, Rockland County, New York
- Title: U.S. Representative from New York's 2nd District
- Term: 20th United States Congress (1827–1829)
- Predecessor: Joshua Sands
- Successor: Jacob Crocheron
- Political party: Jacksonian Democrat

John Jacob Wood (February 16, 1784 – May 20, 1874) was an American politician who served one term as a U.S. representative from New York from 1829 to 1831.

== Biography ==
Born in Clarkstown, New York, Wood was its first town clerk, serving from 1809 to 1812. He served as inspector of schools in 1815, 1823 from 1829 to 1831, and from 1835 to 1836.

Wood was an enslaver.

=== Congress ===
Wood was elected to the 20th Congress (March 4, 1827 – March 3, 1829) as a Jacksonian. He returned to Rockland County after one term, where he served again as inspector of schools from 1829 to 1831 and from 1835 to 1837. He was Surrogate of Rockland County in 1837.

He served as Rockland County delegate to the state constitutional convention in 1846.

=== Death ===
Wood died in New City, New York on May 20, 1874, and was interred in Old Wood Burying Ground.

U.S. House of Representatives
Preceded by Joshua Sands	Member of the U.S. House of Representatives from New York's 2nd congressional district 1827–1829	Succeeded by Jacob Crocheron
