= Abraham Vanderveer =

American politician

Member of the U.S. House of Representatives from New York's 2nd district
- In office 1837–1839
- Preceded by: Samuel Barton
- Succeeded by: James De La Montanya

Personal details
- Born: February 1781 Kings County, New York, U.S.
- Died: July 21, 1839 (aged 58) Brooklyn, New York, U.S.

Abraham Vanderveer (February 1781 – July 21, 1839) was a U.S. representative from New York.

Born in Kings County, New York, Vanderveer attended the common schools. He served as county clerk of Kings County in 1816–1821 and 1822–1837. Upon its organization, he was elected treasurer of the Brooklyn Savings Bank.

Vanderveer was elected as a Democrat to the Twenty-fifth Congress (March 4, 1837 – March 3, 1839). He was not a candidate for renomination in 1838. He died in Brooklyn, New York, on July 21, 1839. He was interred in Reformed Dutch Cemetery.

U.S. House of Representatives
Preceded by Samuel Barton	Member of the U.S. House of Representatives from New York's 2nd congressional district 1837–1839	Succeeded by James De La Montanya
