= Isaac B. Van Houten =

American politician

Isaac B. Van Houten (June 4, 1776 – August 16, 1850) was an American politician who served one term as a U.S. representative from New York from 1833 to 1835.

== Biography ==
Born in Clarkstown (now New City), Rockland County, New York, Van Houten attended the common schools.

He engaged in milling and agricultural pursuits.

=== Political career ===
He served as member of the State assembly 1833–1835.

Van Houten was elected as a Jacksonian to the Twenty-third Congress (March 4, 1833 – March 3, 1835).

=== Later career and death ===
He resumed his former business pursuits.

He died in Clarkstown (now New City), New York, August 16, 1850. He was interred in the family burying ground on his estate near Clarkstown.

U.S. House of Representatives
| Preceded by John T. Bergen | Member of the U.S. House of Representatives from New York's 2nd congressional district 1833–1835 | Succeeded by Samuel Barton |
