= William D. Veeder =

American politician (1835–1910)

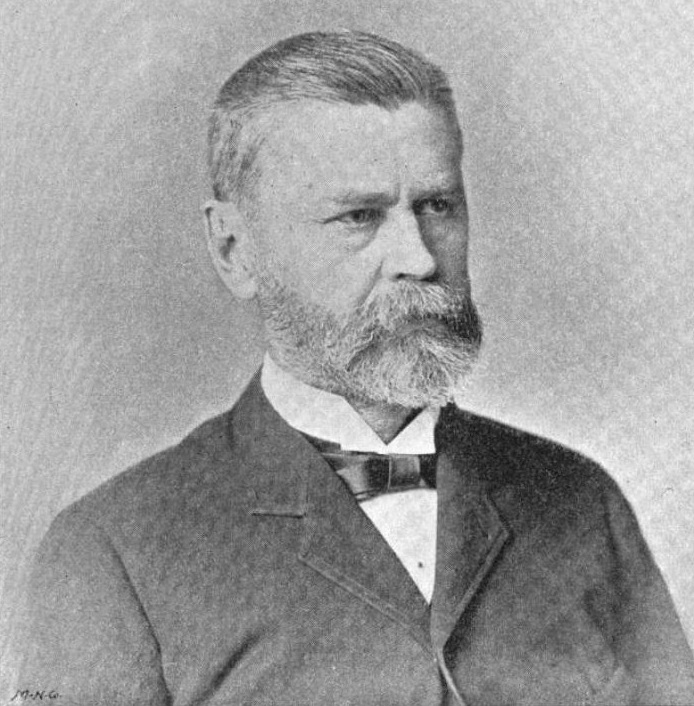

Member of the U.S. House of Representatives from New York's 2nd district
- In office March 4, 1877 – March 3, 1879
- Preceded by: John G. Schumaker
- Succeeded by: Daniel O'Reilly

Member of the New York State Assembly
- In office 1865–1866

Personal details
- Born: William Davis Veeder; May 19, 1835 Guilderland, New York, U.S.
- Died: December 2, 1910 (aged 75) New York City, U.S.
- Resting place: Prospect Hill Cemetery, Guilderland, New York, U.S.
- Occupation: Politician, lawyer

William Davis Veeder (May 19, 1835 – December 2, 1910) was a U.S. representative from New York.

Born in Guilderland, New York, Veeder completed preparatory studies. He studied law. He was admitted to the bar and commenced the practice of law in Brooklyn, New York, in 1858. He served in the State assembly in 1865 and 1866. He served as delegate to the Democratic State conventions in 1875 and 1877. He served as member of the State constitutional convention in 1867 and 1868. Surrogate of Kings County, New York from 1867 to 1877.

Veeder was elected as a Democrat to the Forty-fifth Congress (March 4, 1877 – March 3, 1879). He was not a candidate for renomination in 1878. He resumed the practice of law in Brooklyn. He served as member of the State constitutional convention in 1887 and 1888. He died in Brooklyn, New York, December 2, 1910. He was interred in Prospect Hill Cemetery, Guilderland, New York.

U.S. House of Representatives
Preceded by John G. Schumaker	Member of the U.S. House of Representatives from New York's 2nd congressional district 1877–1879	Succeeded by Daniel O'Reilly
