= Edward C. Waller =

Edward C. Waller may refer to:

- Edward Carson Waller (1845–1931), Chicago real estate developer
- Edward C. Waller III (born 1926), United States Navy admiral

== See also ==
- Edward Waller (disambiguation)
- Edward Walker (disambiguation)
