= Nicholas Fish II =

American diplomat

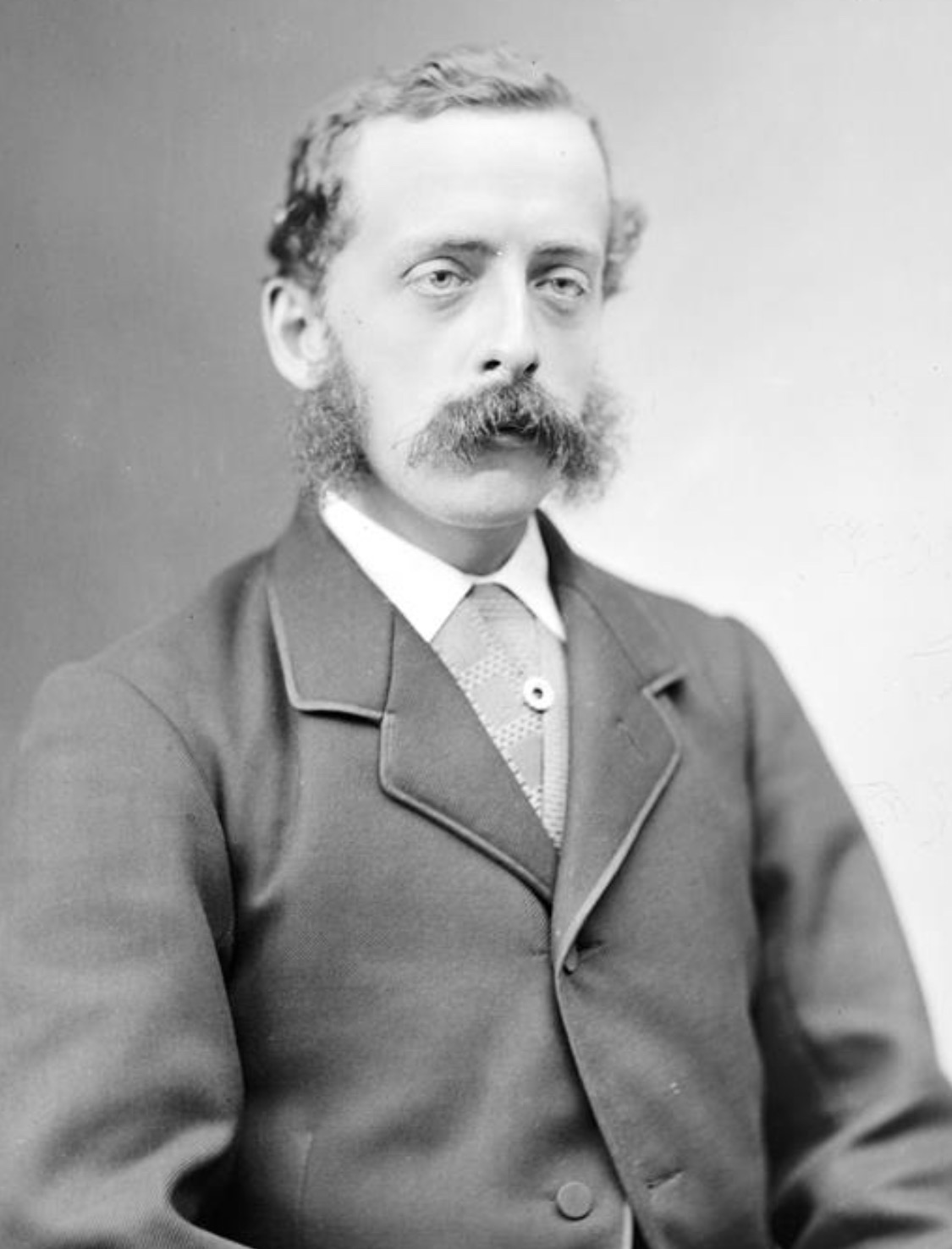

United States Ambassador to Belgium
- In office April 28, 1882 – July 3, 1885
- Preceded by: James O. Putnam
- Succeeded by: Lambert Tree

United States Ambassador to Switzerland
- In office June 20, 1877 – May 11, 1881
- Preceded by: George Schneider
- Succeeded by: Michael J. Cramer

Personal details
- Born: February 19, 1846 New York City
- Died: September 16, 1902 (aged 56) New York City
- Resting place: Saint Philip's Church Cemetery; Garrison, New York
- Party: Republican
- Spouse: Clemence Smith Bryce (m. 1869)
- Children: 2, including Hamilton Fish II
- Parent(s): Hamilton Fish (1808–1893); Julia Ursin Niemcewiez (née Kean) Fish (1816–1887)
- Education: Columbia University; Harvard Law School
- Profession: Lawyer, diplomat, banker

Nicholas Fish II (February 19, 1846–September 16, 1902) was an American diplomat who served as the U.S. ambassador to Switzerland from 1877 to 1881 and the U.S. ambassador to Belgium from 1882 to 1885. In a widely reported crime of the time known as the "sensation of the day," Fish was murdered while leaving a New York City bar.

Fish was a member of the long prominent, and wealthy, Fish family that was closely associated with politics from the Revolutionary War times through modern times with members serving as Lt. Governors and Governors of New York, members of the U.S. House of Representatives, U.S. Senate, and many diplomats.

== Early life ==
Fish was born in New York City on February 19, 1846. He was the eldest son of six children born to Hamilton Fish (1808–1893) and Julia Ursin Niemcewiez (née Kean) Fish (1816–1887). His father served as Governor of New York from 1849 to 1851, U.S. Senator from New York from 1851 to 1857 and the Secretary of State under Presidents Ulysses S. Grant and Rutherford B. Hayes from 1869 until his retirement in 1877. His siblings included Sarah Morris Fish, Julia Kean Fish, Susan Le Roy Fish, Hamilton Fish II, Stuyvesant Fish, and Edith Livingston Fish.

His maternal uncle was U.S. Senator John Kean and he was a great-grandson of Continental Congressmen John Kean and Susan Livingston Kean (herself the daughter of New York State Treasurer Peter Van Brugh Livingston). Her family was also associated with the Wadsworths, the Kings, and the Duers. His paternal grandparents were American Revolutionary War soldier Nicholas Fish and Elizabeth (née Stuyvesant) Fish, a descendant of Peter Stuyvesant and the daughter of Margaret (née Livingston) Stuyvesant.

He was educated at Columbia University, earning a Bachelor of Arts in 1867 and a Master of Arts in 1871. While there, he was a member of the Fraternity of Delta Psi (St. Anthony Hall) and the Philolexian Society.

He also attended Harvard Law School earning a Bachelor of Laws in 1869.

== Career ==
Following his graduation from law school, he practiced law in New York City, then went into the diplomatic service.

Appointed as the Second Secretary of Legation at Berlin (1871), he became Secretary (1874) and acted in the continued absence of his chief as chargé d'affaires, held the latter position in Switzerland (1877–81) and then served as minister to Belgium (1882–86). He returned to New York City in 1887 and became a member of the banking firm of Harriman & Co. at 120 Broadway, of which his brother Stuyvesant was the President.

Following the death of his father, he became a member of the New York Society of the Cincinnati in 1894 and later served as president of the New York Society from 1901 until his death the next year. He was also a member of the New-York Historical Society and the Union Club of the City of New York, beginning in 1873.

In the 1896 presidential election, he was a presidential elector.

== Family ==
In 1869, Fish married Clemence Smith Bryce (1847–1908), the daughter of Major James Smith Bryce. She was the sister of Lloyd Stephens Bryce, a member of the U.S. House of Representatives and U.S. Minister to the Netherlands, who was married to Edith Cooper, the daughter of New York Mayor Edward Cooper. Together, they were the parents of two children:

- Elizabeth Fish (1870–1954), who married Robert Burnside Potter, an architect who was the son of Maj. Gen. Robert Brown Potter and the nephew of Bishop Henry Codman Potter, in 1889.
- Hamilton Fish II (1873–1898), who was a member of the Rough Riders in the Spanish–American War, and was killed at the Battle of Las Guasimas.

Together, they lived at 53 Irving Place near Grammercy Park in New York City and maintained a residence in Tuxedo Park, New York.

=== Death and burial ===
Fish was fatally assaulted in New York City on September 16, 1902, after spending several hours in the company of two women at the Ehrhard Brothers saloon at 265 West 34th Street, off of Eighth Avenue. According to The New York Times, the two women he was with that night "were well known in that vicinity. They live in West Thirty-fourth Street, between Ninth and Tenth Avenues, and are usually accompanied by two men, one a salesman of jewelry." Fish died from blunt force trauma to the head after being struck while exiting the saloon. Thomas J. Sharkey was convicted of manslaughter and subsequently sentenced to ten years in prison. Fish was buried at Saint Philip's Church Cemetery in Garrison, New York. In 1903, his widow sold their home in Irving Place. She died in 1908.

=== Descendants ===
Through his daughter Elizabeth, he was the grandfather of Hamilton Fish Potter (d. 1978), a member of the New York State Assembly, and the great-grandfather of Hamilton Fish Potter, Jr. (d. 1997), also a Harvard lawyer who worked in banking.
