= John A. Lynch (New York politician) =

American businessman and politician

John A. Lynch (October 11, 1882 – March 9, 1954) was an American businessman and politician from New York.

== Life ==
Lynch was born on October 11, 1882, in West New Brighton, Staten Island, New York.

Lynch initially apprenticed as a builder under his father. In 1903, at the age of 21, he began working in the insurance and real estate business and incorporated the John A. Lynch Company. In 1913, he was appointed commissioner of deeds. In 1914, he was elected the first vice-president of the West New Brighton Board of Trade. He remained active in his company, later known as the John A. Lynch Fire Insurance Company, until his death.

In 1918, Lynch was elected to the New York State Senate as a Democrat, representing New York's 24th State Senate district (Richmond and Rockland Counties). He served in the Senate in 1919 and 1920. He was a close friend and confidant of Matthew J. Cahill, and after then Richmond Borough President Cahill died in 1922, Lynch was appointed by the Richmond aldermen to succeed him as Borough President. He won the election for the office later that year, and was re-elected in 1925 and 1929. As Borough President, he worked to bring bridges and subways to Staten Island, and was instrumental in getting two bridges over the Arthur Kill built to connect Staten Island to New Jersey. He also spurred an extensive amount of construction and development in the borough, and oversaw industrial growth and a population boom. During the Seabury investigation, he was accused of committing an irregular business deal. Although the case against him blew over, in 1933 he lost the nomination for his re-election thanks to the efforts of Democratic leader David S. Rendt, a previously close associate he broke with in 1929. He ran as an independent but lost by a narrow margin to Republican Joseph A. Palma. He ran again for Borough President as a Democrat in 1945, but he lost to Cornelius A. Hall. In 1938, he worked as a stenographer for Queens Borough President George U. Harvey to qualify for a city pension.

Lynch was a member of the Elks and the New York Press Club. He was married to Grace McKee.

Lynch died at home on March 9, 1954. He was buried in the Moravian Cemetery.

New York State Senate
Preceded by George A. Slater	New York State Senate; 24th District; 1919–1920	Succeeded by C. Ernest Smith
Political offices
Preceded by Matthew J. Cahill	Borough President of Staten Island; 1922–1933	Succeeded by Joseph A. Palma
