= Hamilton Fish II (Rough Rider) =

American soldier (1873–1898)

Hamilton Fish
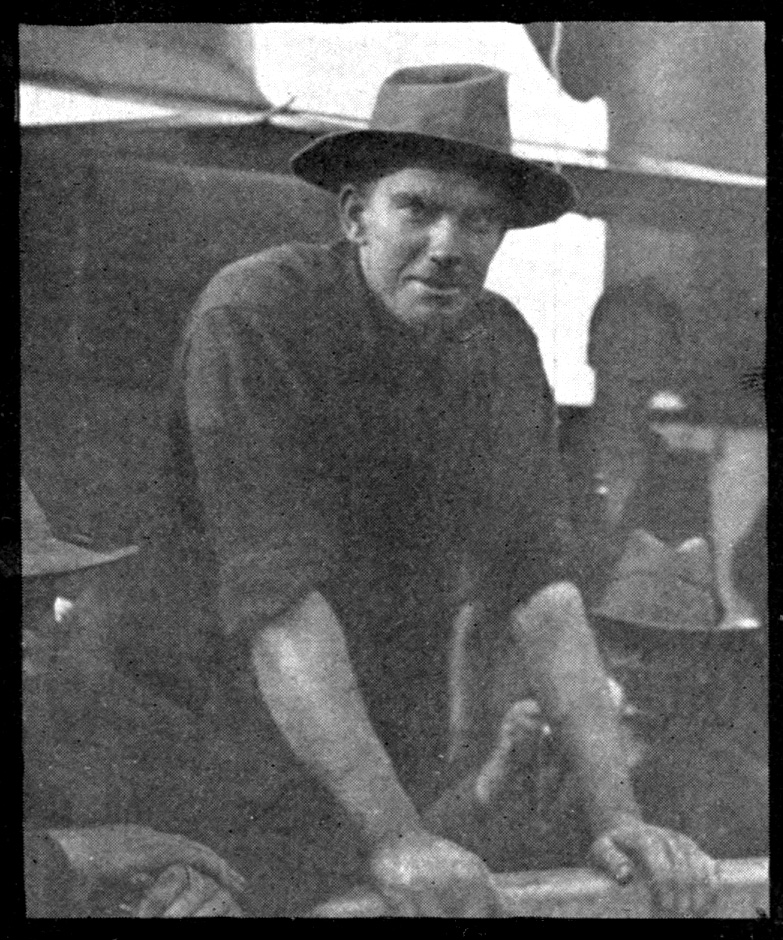
- Hamilton Fish on June 10, 1898, two weeks before his death
- Born: June 27, 1873; New York City
- Died: June 24, 1898 (aged 24); Santiago de Cuba, Cuba
- Burial place: Saint Philip's Church Cemetery, Garrison, New York
- Military career
- Allegiance: United States of America
- Branch: United States Army
- Service years: 1898
- Rank: Sergeant
- Nickname: Ham
- Unit: 1st United States Volunteer Cavalry Regiment
- Conflicts: Spanish–American War: Battle of Las Guasimas

Hamilton Fish II (June 27, 1873 – June 24, 1898) was an American soldier who was a member of the prominent Fish family. During the Spanish–American War he joined the Rough Riders in the invasion of Cuba, where he died in the Battle of Las Guasimas.

== Biography ==
Fish was son of diplomat and banker Nicholas Fish and Clemence Smith (Bryce) Fish. He was the nephew of namesake Hamilton Fish II, the former speaker of the New York State Assembly, and grandson of the 26th United States Secretary of State, Hamilton Fish. Fish attended Columbia University as a member of the class of 1895 and was a member of St. Anthony Hall. To prepare for a career as a railroad executive, he was employed through family connections by the Denver and Rio Grande Western Railroad in Salt Lake City, where he worked in the maintenance and repair shops, as a brakeman, and in other blue collar positions within the company.

During the Spanish-American war, he joined the United States Army's 1st Volunteer Cavalry Regiment, known as the Rough Riders, where he held the rank of sergeant, and was considered by Theodore Roosevelt "one of the best non-commissioned officers we had". Fish was a member of "L" troop commanded by Captain Allyn K. Capron Jr. He was not the only soldier from a prominent family in the unit, which contained a number of Ivy Leaguers from wealthy Eastern families. In citing their qualifications for active duty, Roosevelt touted their athletic accomplishments: Hamilton Fish was "the ex-captain of the Columbia crew"; Dudley Dean was "perhaps the best quarterback who ever played on a Harvard elevan"; Bob Wrenn was "the champion tennis player of America." Other college athletes included Yale high-jumper Edward C. Waller, steeplechase rider Craig Wadsworth, and polo-player Joe Stephens.

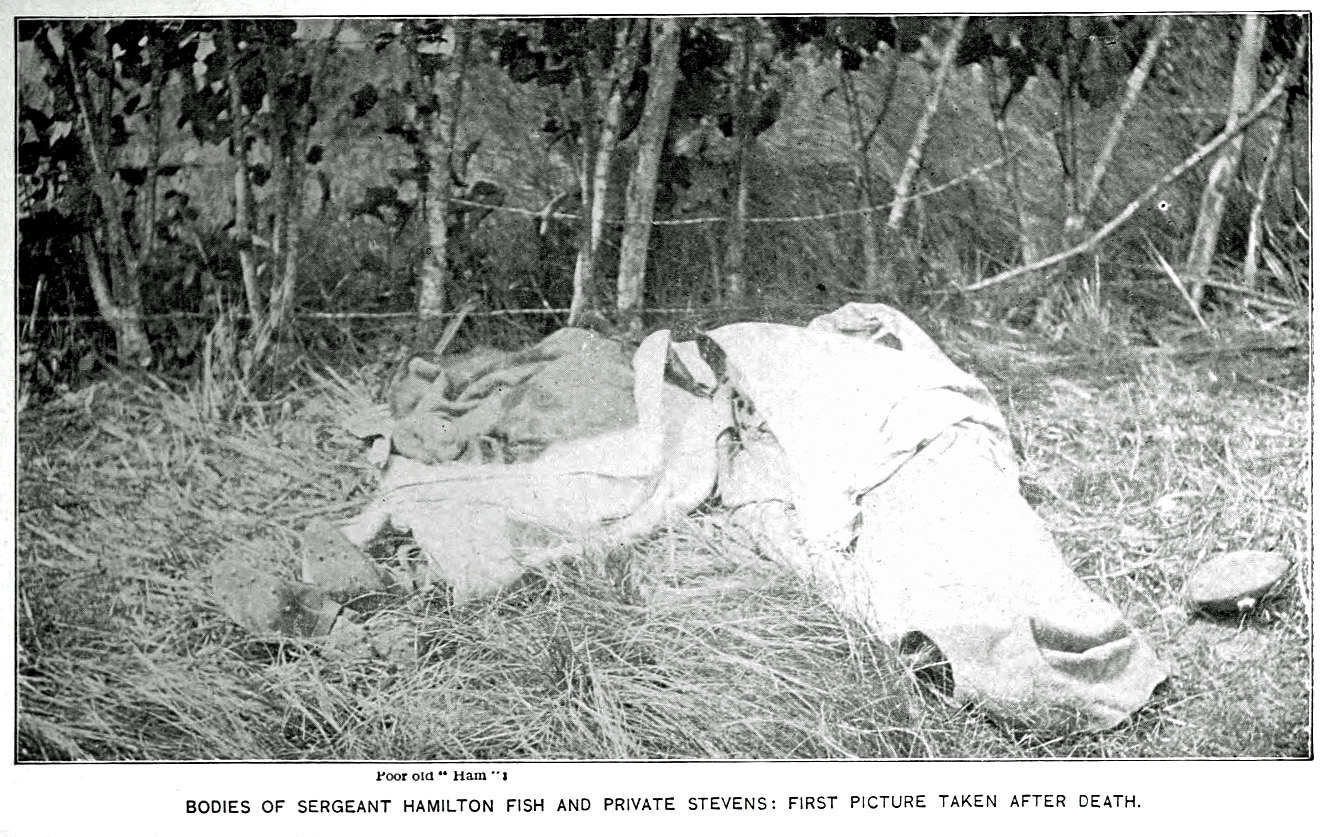
The bodies of Sergeant Fish and Private Stevens after the Battle of Las Guasimas (photo Burr McIntosh)

Fish was one of the first Americans killed at the Battle of Las Guasimas, near Santiago, Cuba, on June 24, 1898. His final moments were described by one of his troopers, Ed Culver, who was wounded by the same bullet. The journalist Burr McIntosh, who was present at the battle, saw his body shortly after his death and observed that "there was no sign of pain, only the faint suggestion of the old smile of victory, which I had so often seen". Fish's death was widely covered in the press: his youth, his famous family, and his untimely end made him one of the popular heroes of the war. McIntosh, who had taken the last photograph of Fish alive, resisted the temptation to photograph the face of the man in death, but he nevertheless took photographs of the covered body, alongside that of another fallen American soldier. First published in Leslie's Weekly on July 28, 1898, and often reproduced, these were among the very few published photos of American war dead, and became "one of the most enduring images of the Spanish-American war".
