= Orsamus H. Marshall =

American lawyer

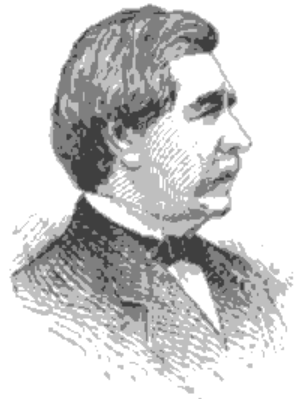

2nd Chancellor of the University of Buffalo
- In office 1874–1884
- Preceded by: Millard Fillmore
- Succeeded by: E. Carleton Sprague

Personal details
- Born: Orsamus Holmes Marshall; February 1, 1813 Franklin, Connecticut
- Died: July 9, 1884 (aged 71) Buffalo, New York
- Education: Union College

Orsamus Holmes Marshall (1813–1884) was an American lawyer, educator and historian.

== Biography ==
Orsamus H. Marshall was born in Franklin, Connecticut on February 1, 1813. In 1831 he graduated from Union College. He then studied for the bar, to which he was admitted in 1834. That year, he opened a law office in Buffalo, NY which later became Phillips Lytle LLP. He was one of the founders of the Buffalo Female Academy and of the Buffalo Historical Society. He also served several years as chancellor of the University of Buffalo. He wrote much in connection with the Iroquois dealings with European Americans. Posthumously there appeared a volume entitled Historical Writings of Orsamus H. Marshall Relating to the Early History of the West (1887).

He died at his home in Buffalo on July 9, 1884.
