= Ed Walker =

Ed Walker may refer to:

- Ed Walker (radio personality) (1932–2015), American radio personality
- Ed Walker (American football) (1901–1972), American football player and coach of football and basketball
- Ed Walker (American veteran) (1917–2011), American veteran of World War II, businessman, publisher and writer
- Ed Walker (baseball) (1874–1947), Major League Baseball pitcher
- Ed Walker (Ninjago), a character in Ninjago

== See also ==
- Edward Walker (disambiguation)
- Ed Waller (1889–1977), American stage, film and television actor
- Edna Walker, a character in Ninjago
