= E. Carleton Sprague =

American politician

Eben Carleton Sprague
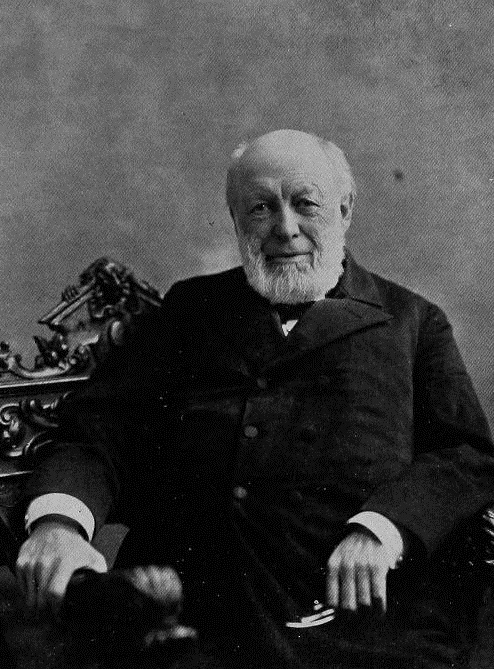

3rd Chancellor of the University of Buffalo
- In office 1885–1895
- Preceded by: Orsamus H. Marshall
- Succeeded by: James O. Putnam

Personal details
- Born: November 28, 1822 Bath, New Hampshire
- Died: February 14, 1895 (aged 72) Buffalo, New York
- Resting place: Forest Lawn Cemetery
- Party: Republican Party
- Spouse: Elizabeth Hubbard Williams
- Children: 8
- Parent(s): Noah Paul Sprague; Abiah (Carlton) Sprague
- Education: Phillips Exeter Academy
- Alma mater: Harvard College

Eben Carleton Sprague (November 28, 1822 – February 14, 1895) was an American lawyer and politician from New York.

== Life ==
He was born on November 28, 1822, in Bath, Grafton County, New Hampshire, the son of Noah Paul Sprague (1798–1879) and Abiah (Carlton) Sprague. He attended Phillips Exeter Academy, and graduated from Harvard College in 1843.

== Career ==
Sprague studied law with Millard Fillmore and Solomon G. Haven and was admitted to the bar in 1846, and practicing in Buffalo, New York. From 1854 until his death, he practiced in partnership with Fillmore's son, Millard Powers Fillmore, and was an attorney for the Erie Railway.

He was elected and became a member of the New York State Senate (31st D.) in 1877 as a Republican. Sprague served as the third Chancellor of the University of Buffalo from 1885 until his death in 1895. The first was former U.S. President Millard Fillmore and the second was Orsamus H. Marshall, the American lawyer, educator and historian.

== Personal life ==
On June 25, 1849, he married Elizabeth Hubbard Williams (1831–1908), and they had eight children. He died on February 14, 1895, in Buffalo, New York.

== Sources ==
- THE OBITUARY RECORD; S. Carlton Sprague (sic) in NYT on February 15, 1895
- Obituary; E. Carlton Sprague in The Harvard Crimson on February 19, 1895
- Sprague genealogy
- Chancellors of Buffalo University

New York State Senate
Preceded by Sherman S. Rogers	New York State Senate; 31st District; 1877	Succeeded by Ray V. Pierce
Academic offices
Preceded by Orsamus H. Marshall	Chancellor of the University of Buffalo; 1885–1895	Succeeded by James O. Putnam
