= Matthew J. Cahill =

American politician from New York (1869-1922)

4th Staten Island Borough President
- In office January 1, 1922 – July 14, 1922
- Preceded by: Calvin D. Van Name
- Succeeded by: John A. Lynch

Personal details
- Born: 1869 New York City, U.S.
- Died: July 14, 1922 (aged 53) New York City, U.S.
- Party: Democratic
- Children: 1

Matthew J. Cahill (1869 – July 14, 1922) was an American politician who served as the 4th Staten Island Borough President as a member of the Democratic party from January 1, 1922, until his death in office on July 14, 1922.

== Early life ==
Cahill was born in 1869 in New York City and married Mary B. Sheridan. The couple had a daughter who died in childhood.

== Political career and death ==
Cahill was elected on November 8, 1921, as the 4th Staten Island Borough President with 18,390 votes or 57.49% in a four-person race, with his closest opponent Republican nominee and former Staten Island Borough President George Cromwell receiving 13,209 votes or 41.29%. Cahill was sworn in as Borough President on January 1, 1922, and served until his sudden death in office on July 14, 1922. Cahill was buried in Saint Peter's Cemetery in Staten Island.

Political offices
Preceded by Calvin D. Van Name	Staten Island Borough President; 1922	Succeeded by John A. Lynch
