= Sherman S. Rogers =

American politician (1830–1900)

Sherman Skinner Rogers (April 16, 1830 Bath, Steuben County, New York – March 23, 1900 Santa Barbara, California) was an American lawyer and politician from New York.

== Life ==
He was the son of Gustavus Adolphus Rogers and Susan Ann (Campbell) Rogers; and a descendant of Thomas Rogers, a passenger on the Mayflower in 1620.

Sherman S. Rogers studied law, was admitted to the bar in 1851, and practiced in Bath. In 1854, he removed to Buffalo. On January 6, 1858, he married Christina Cameron Davenport, and they had several children.

He was a member of the Constitutional Commission of 1872–1873.

He was a member of the New York State Senate (31st D.) in 1876. At the New York state election, 1876, he ran on the Republican ticket for Lieutenant Governor of New York, but was defeated by the Democratic incumbent William Dorsheimer.

Rogers died of "cerebral meningitis" at the home of his son Robert Cameron Rogers (1862–1912) in Santa Barbara, California.

== Sources ==
- ROGERS, Sherman Skinner in National Cyclopedia of American Biography (1943; pg. 448)
- DEATH LIST OF A DAY; Sherman S. Rogers in NYT on March 24, 1900
- Robert Cameron Rogers

New York State Senate
Preceded by Albert P. Laning	New York State Senate; 31st District; 1876	Succeeded by E. Carleton Sprague
