= Joseph A. Palma =

American politician (1889–1969)

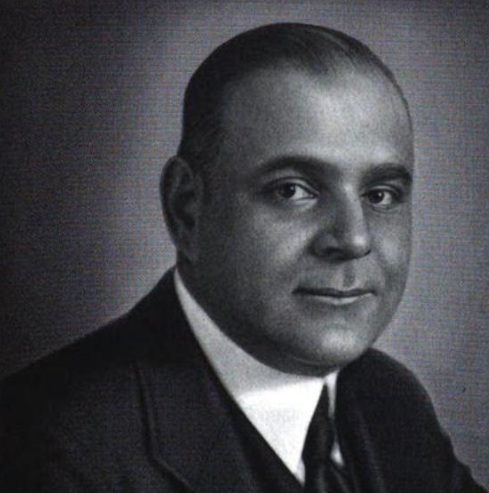
- From Volume 3 of 1930's Staten Island and Its People: A History, 1609-1929

6th Borough President of Staten Island
- In office January 1, 1934 – December 31, 1945
- Preceded by: John A. Lynch
- Succeeded by: Cornelius A. Hall

Personal details
- Born: June 5, 1889 Rosebank, Staten Island
- Died: October 18, 1969 (aged 80)
- Party: Republican
- Spouse(s): Marie Moore (died 1940); Christine Sullivan (died 1966)
- Children: 11

Joseph A. Palma (June 5, 1889 – October 18, 1969) was an American businessman who served as Borough President of Staten island from 1933 to 1945. Prior to his election as borough president in 1933, he served for 12 years with the U.S. Secret Service.

== Biography ==
Palma was born in Rosebank on June 5, 1889 and attended public schools on Staten Island. Palma became a detective with the New York State detective force in 1909 and six years later was named a special operative with the Secret Service.

He headed the Secret Service’s Michigan and New York units and later was the principal agent of the Treasury Department’s detective unit. His accomplishments included safeguarding delegates to the Washington Peace Conference in 1921.

While serving in Detroit, Palma developed a lasting friendship with industrialist Henry Ford. When he retired from the Secret Service in 1929, he opened Palma Motors, a Ford dealership, on Castleton Avenue in West Brighton. He, and later his son, David, ran the dealership until 1958.

Palma was elected borough president in 1933 on the Republican-Fusion ticket, narrowly defeating incumbent John Lynch by 541 votes.

Mayor Fiorello LaGuardia’s Fusion Party urged non-partisan government administration of New York City. Although the country was caught up in Democratic fervor following the 1932 election of Franklin D. Roosevelt, many Republicans in New York City contests were elected when they also were endorsed by the Fusion Party, Palma among them.

== Accomplishments ==
During his three terms in office, Staten Island benefited from many city, state and federal projects. The country’s first foreign trade zone was established in Stapleton, and the Franklin Delano Roosevelt Boardwalk at South Beach and George Cromwell Recreation Center in Tompkinsville were built.

Additionally, during Palma’s administration Drumgoole Boulevard was constructed, hundreds of miles of roads were rebuilt and more than $3 million in new drainage facilities were installed.

One of Palma’s unrealized goals was to link Staten Island with Manhattan. He envisioned a tunnel running from St. George to Manhattan. City officials found this proposal ludicrous and labeled it “Palma’s Folly.” He also supported the concept of a new bridge across the Narrows.

Palma left office in 1945, the first of the Staten Island’s borough presidents to step down voluntarily. He became president of the American Atlantic Trading Corp., an import-export firm in Manhattan. In 1951, he was named to an executive post in the National Civil Defense Administration and continued that assignment until 1967.

He ran again for borough president in 1955 as an independent, but finished third in the race, losing to Democrat Albert Maniscalco.

Palma’s first wife, Marie Moore, died in 1940. The couple had 11 children, Joseph Jr., David, Marie, Robert, George, Alice, John, Richard, James, Eileen and Raymond. He was the grandfather of double bassist Donald Palma. His second wife, Christine Sullivan, died in 1966. Palma died at the age of 80, on October 18, 1969.

Palma built and lived in the home featured in Francis Ford Coppola's 1972 Oscar-winning movie The Godfather with his wife Marie and 11 children until it was sold for nearly $1.7 million to the Norton family in 1951. The five-bedroom, seven bathroom, 6,248-square-foot English Tudor style mansion sits on a 2,400-square-foot open expanse at 110 Longfellow Avenue on Emerson Hill.

Political offices
Preceded by John A. Lynch	Borough President of Staten Island; 1934–1945	Succeeded by Cornelius A. Hall
