= Edward Waller =

Edward Waller may refer to:

- Edward Waller (bishop) (1871–1942), Anglican clergyman
- Edward Waller (zoologist) (1803–1873), Irish zoologist
- Edward C. Waller III (born 1926), admiral in the United States Navy
- Edward Carson Waller (1845–1931), Chicago developer and patron of Frank Lloyd Wright
- Eddy Waller (1889–1977), American film and television actor

== See also ==
- Edward Walker (disambiguation)
