= Edward Walker =

Edward Walker may refer to:

- Edward Walker (cricketer) (1816–1857), English academic and cricketer
- Edward Walker (mathematician) (1820–1893), English applied mathematician
- Edward Walker (officer of arms) (1611–1677), British officer of arms
- Edward Walker (politician) (born 1969), Republican member of the Montana Legislature
- Edward Alexander Walker (1864–1946), American Medal of Honor recipient
- Edward C. Walker (New York politician) (1837–1903), New York politician
- E. C. Walker (1820–1894), Michigan politician
- Edward Craven Walker (1918–2000), inventor of the Lava Lamp
- Edward F. Walker (1852–1918), general superintendent of the Church of the Nazarene
- Edward Forbes Walker (1876–?), rugby union international
- Edward G. Walker (1830–1901), American artisan and attorney
- Edward Hazen Walker, politician from the province of Saskatchewan, Canada
- Edward Noël Walker (1842–1908), acting governor of British Ceylon
- Edward Ronald Walker (1907–1988), known as Sir Ronald Walker, Australian economist and diplomat
- Edward S. Walker Jr. (born 1940), former U.S. assistant secretary of state, ambassador and president of the Middle East Institute
- Ted Walker (1934–2004), English poet

== See also ==
- Edward Forestier-Walker (1812–1881), British Army officer
- Ed Walker (disambiguation)
- Edward Waller (disambiguation)
