= Waller Apartments =

Apartment building in Chicago, Illinois

Coordinates: 41.885635°N 87.69822°W

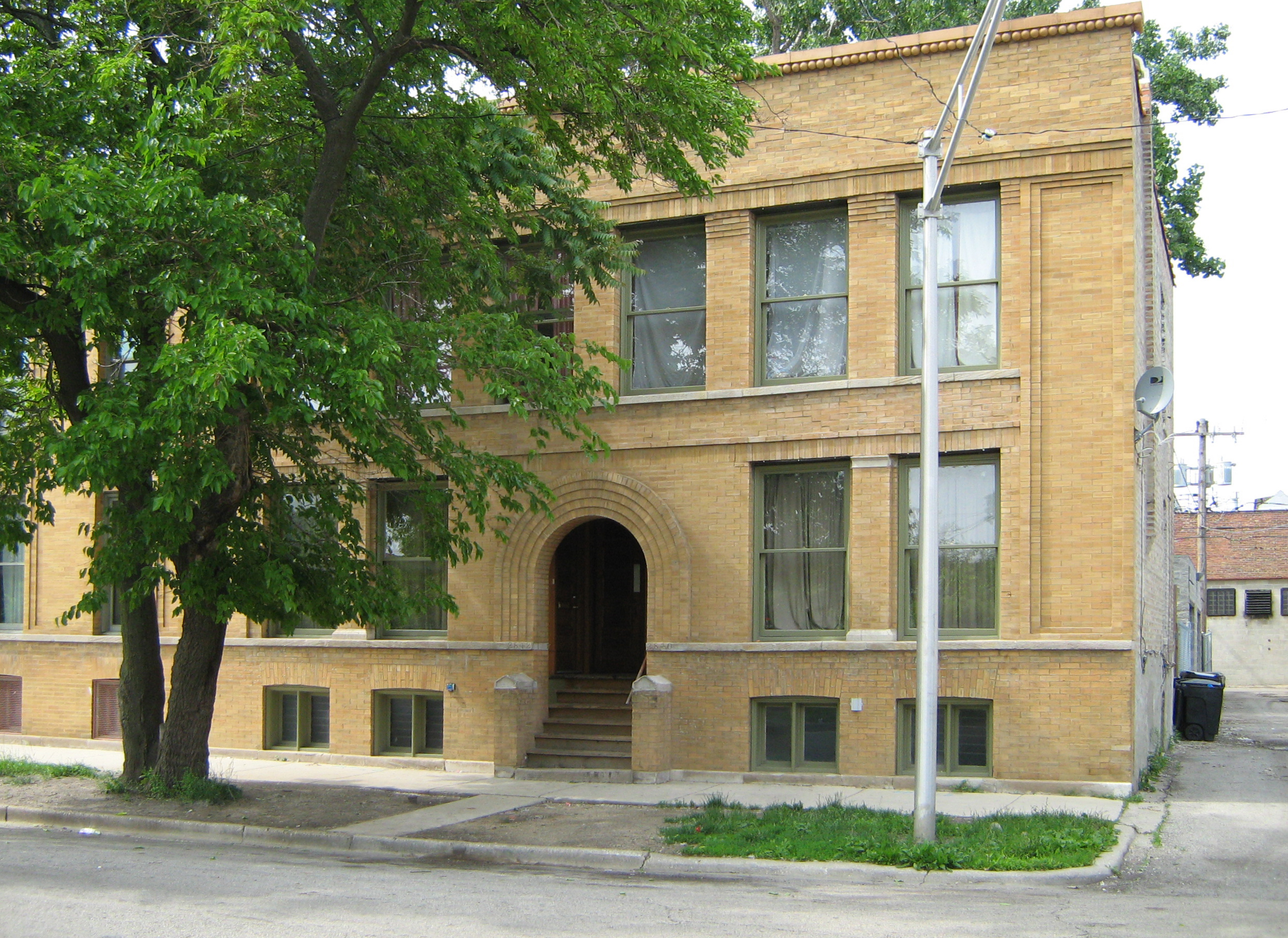
Edward C. Waller Apartments

The Edward C. Waller Apartments are located from 2840 to 2858 W. Walnut Street in Chicago, Illinois. They were designed by Frank Lloyd Wright and built in 1895 and named after Edward C. Waller, who was a prominent Chicago developer after the 1871 fire. Waller and Wright collaborated on the Waller apartments and the Francisco Terrace apartments to execute Waller's pioneering idea of subsidizing lower income housing. Each apartment was designed with a parlor, chamber (bedroom), dining room, kitchen, bathroom, and closets.

Some of the oldest buildings to be used for subsidized housing in Chicago, they received Chicago Landmark status on March 2, 1994.

== See also ==
- List of Frank Lloyd Wright works
