= James O. Putnam =

American politician

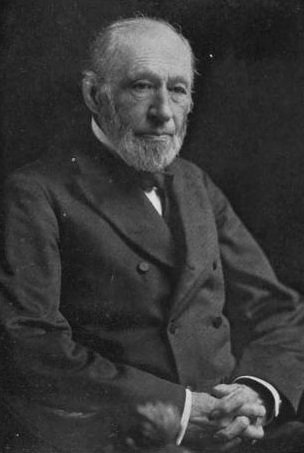

4th Chancellor of the University of Buffalo
- In office 1895–1902
- Preceded by: E. Carleton Sprague
- Succeeded by: Wilson S. Bissell

7th United States Minister to Belgium
- In office 1880–1882
- President: Rutherford B. Hayes
- Preceded by: William C. Goodloe
- Succeeded by: Nicholas Fish II

United States consul at Le Havre, France
- In office 1861–1866
- President: Abraham Lincoln

Member of the New York State Senate from the 31st district
- In office 1854–1855
- Preceded by: George R. Babcock
- Succeeded by: James Wadsworth

Personal details
- Born: James Osborne Putnam; July 4, 1818 Attica, New York
- Died: April 24, 1903 (aged 84) Buffalo, New York
- Resting place: Forest Lawn Cemetery
- Party: Conservative Whig
- Spouses: Harriet Foster Palmer (m. 1842; died 1853); Kate Frances Wright (m. 1855; died 1895)
- Education: Yale College
- Father: Harvey Putnam
- Relatives: Benjamin Simonds (great-grandfather)

James Osborne Putnam (July 4, 1818 – April 24, 1903) was an American lawyer and politician from New York.

== Life ==
Putnam was born July 4, 1818, in Attica, New York. He was the son of Congressman Harvey Putnam (1793–1855) and Myra Osborne (1795–1863). He was the great-grandson of Col. Benjamin Simonds on his maternal side. He was educated at Middlebury Academy in Wyoming, New York, and attended Hamilton College through his Sophomore year. In 1837 entered the Junior class at Yale College where he graduated in 1839. Putnam then studied law under the direction of his father, and was admitted to the Bar in 1841. He commenced practice in Buffalo, New York. Putnam was appointed Secretary and Treasurer of the Attica & Buffalo Railroad Company in 1844 and of the Buffalo & Rochester Railroad Company in 1846. He also served as their attorney until they merged into the New York Central Railroad in 1853. President Millard Fillmore appointed Putnam as Postmaster of Buffalo.

In 1854–1855, Putnam was elected member of the 77th and 78th New York State Senate to represent the 31st District. He was a Conservative Whig, but opposed slavery in the United States territories and was the author of the Church Property Bill of 1855.

At the 1857 New York state election, he ran on the American party ticket for Secretary of State of New York, but was defeated by Democrat Gideon J. Tucker.

He was a presidential elector in 1860, voting for Abraham Lincoln and Hannibal Hamlin.

In 1861, Putnam was appointed United States Consul at Havre, France by President Abraham Lincoln and held the position for the duration of the Civil War.

In 1865, Yale University gave Putnam a Master of Arts degree.

In 1880, President Rutherford B. Hayes appointed Putnam as U.S. Minister to Belgium and held this position until 1882.

He was Chancellor of the University of Buffalo from 1895 to 1902.

Putnam was a member of the Buffalo Historical Society, University Club, and Saturn Club of Buffalo.

On January 5, 1842, he married Harriet Foster Palmer (died 1853), and they had four children. On March 15, 1855, he married Kate Frances Wright (1835–1895), and they had three sons.

He died April 24, 1903, in Buffalo, New York, and was buried at the Forest Lawn Cemetery.

== Sources ==
- The New York Civil List compiled by Franklin Benjamin Hough (pg. 137 and 144; Weed, Parsons and Co., 1858)
- The New York Civil List (pg. 546; Weed, Parsons and Co., 1865)
- DEATH LIST OF A DAY; James O. Putnam in NYT on April 25, 1903
- Putnam genealogy at Family Tree Maker

New York State Senate
Preceded by George R. Babcock	New York State Senate; 31st District; 1854–1855	Succeeded by James Wadsworth
Diplomatic posts
Preceded by William C. Goodloe	U.S. Minister to Belgium; 1880–1882	Succeeded by Nicholas Fish II
Academic offices
Preceded by E. Carleton Sprague	Chancellor of the University of Buffalo; 1895–1902	Succeeded by Wilson S. Bissell
