= Calvin D. Van Name =

American lawyer and politician

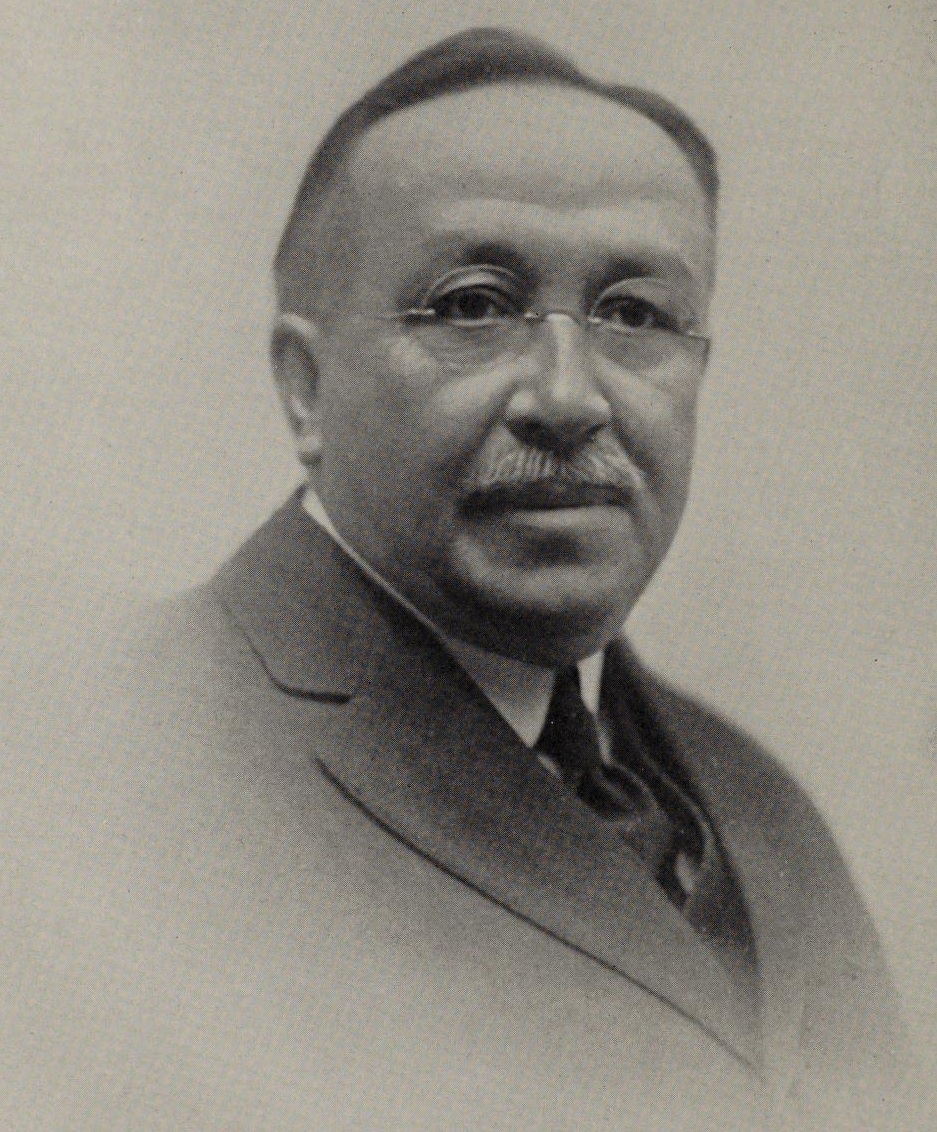
From Volume 3 of 1930's Staten Island and Its People, A History, 1609-1929

Calvin Decker Van Name (January 3, 1857 – September 14, 1924) was an American lawyer and politician from New York.

== Life ==
Van Name was born on January 3, 1857, in Mariners Harbor, Staten Island, the son of oyster planter William Henry Van Name.

Van Name graduated from New York University School of Law in 1877. He was taught law by then-state senator Bradford Prince. He was admitted to the bar once he reached 21. He then began practicing law and opened a law office in Manhattan, although he continued living in Mariners Harbor.

In 1900, Van Name was elected to the New York State Assembly as a Democrat, representing Richmond County. He served in the Assembly in 1901 and 1914. In 1915, he became Borough President of Staten Island to fill the vacancy caused by the death of the Charles J. McCormack. He was elected to the office in 1917. He later became special investigator of the city law department, a position he held when he died.

Van Name was a member of the Freemasons and the Holland Society.

Van Name died at home on September 14, 1924. He was buried in Lake Cemetery in Graniteville.

New York State Assembly
| Preceded by George Metcalfe | New York State Assembly; Richmond County; 1901 | Succeeded by Ferdinand C. Townsend |
| Preceded by Ralph R. McKee | New York State Assembly; Richmond County; 1914 | Succeeded by Stephen D. Stephens |
Political offices
| Preceded by Spire Pitou, Jr. | Borough President of Staten Island; 1915-1921 | Succeeded by Matthew J. Cahill |
