= Edward Walker (cricketer) =

English cricketer and academic

Edward Walker (21 February 1816 – 2 or 8 June 1857) was an English academic and a cricketer who played a single first-class cricket match for Cambridge University in 1838. He was born at Oxford. His death is less certain: the directory of Cambridge alumni and cricket websites state that he died at Pau in France on 8 June 1857; contemporary records indicate he died on 2 June, and suggest his brother's house in London as a venue.

Walker was educated at Eton College and at King's College, Cambridge. As a cricketer, he played in his single first-class match in 1838 as a lower-order batsman, though it is not known whether he was right- or left-handed: he made two runs in his only innings. He played in other minor matches in both 1837 and 1840, but did not appear again in first-class cricket.

Walker graduated from Cambridge University with a Bachelor of Arts degree in 1839, and this converted to a Master of Arts in 1842. He became a fellow of King's College, and was also bursar, though the death notices for him in 1857 indicate that he had given up this role. He was also ordained as a Church of England priest, but there are no details of when and where.
