= Commissioner of deeds =

A Commissioner of Deeds is an officer having authority to take affidavits, depositions, acknowledgments of deeds, etc., for use in the state by which the person is appointed. The office is similar to that of Notaries Public; thus, commissioners of deeds generally authenticate their acts with some type of official seal.

== In the United States ==
The office of Commissioner of Deeds is one unique to the United States. During the 19th century, deeds concerning property located in a particular state could only be acknowledged before a Notary Public in that state; if the deeds was acknowledged outside the state where the subject property was located, the grantor would have to find a judge of a court of record to take the acknowledgment. Because of the difficulty in finding a judge, most states created the office of Commissioner of Deeds to allow state officials to be present in other states to assist with the acknowledgment of instruments intended to be used in the state by which the commissioner was appointed. Over time, states began to accept the notarial acts of notaries in other states and the need for commissioners became eradicated. As a result, most of the states abolished the office during the 20th century. Although at one time at least half of all states appointed such commissioners, currently the only states whose statutes authorize such appointment are the states of Colorado, Florida, Kentucky, Maine, Mississippi, Missouri, New Hampshire, New Jersey, New York, Rhode Island, South Dakota, Texas, Virginia, West Virginia, and Wisconsin. Usually the appointment and commission is granted by the state governor or secretary of state. However, even in the states which have laws allowing the appointment of commissioners, the majority of these states no longer grant appointments. Currently, only Florida, New Hampshire, New York and West Virginia still allow the appointment of commissioners.

=== In Florida ===
In the state of Florida, Commissioners of Deeds are officers appointed by the Secretary of State to take acknowledgments and administer oaths on documents executed outside Florida, but to be used or recorded in connection with a timeshare property located in Florida. Commissioners are appointed to serve in foreign countries, U.S. territories outside the 50 states, and international waters.

The office of Commissioners of Deeds in the state of Florida was first created on January 28, 1831, and at that time such commissioners could authenticate any document to be used in Florida. The commissioner was appointed to one particular U.S. state or a foreign country, and was required to actually live in that state/country. However, the Governor at that time requested that the office be abolished, because he claimed that the office had "been used to facilitate fraudulent acts on some occasions." The office in its then-current form was abolished and replaced by the new form of "Timeshare Commissioner of Deeds" on April 30, 1998.

=== In New Hampshire ===
In the state of New Hampshire, Commissioners of Deeds are officers appointed by the Governor to a term of five years, who are authorized to administer oaths, take depositions and affidavits, take acknowledgments of deeds and other instruments of writing, for documents intended to be used or recorded in the state of New Hampshire. Such commissioners may not be residents of New Hampshire; however, they are authorized to act both within and without the state.

=== In New York ===
In the state of New York, a Commissioner of Deeds is an official with duties similar to that of a Notary Public. It is not a paid office. The commissioner must file an application and pass an examination; however, the application is filed with and appointment is made by a local city government rather than the state, as is the case with notaries public. Commissioners of deeds are normally appointed en masse in periodic acts of the city council.

Despite the name, their powers are not restricted to certifying signatures on property transfers. A large number of political party officials and activists apply to become commissioners of deeds to certify signatures on nominating petitions in New York's notoriously complex elections process, as the application is cheaper and the registration process slightly less cumbersome than for a notary.

New York law also authorizes the appointment of commissioners to act in foreign jurisdictions, who are required to use a seal, bearing their name as commissioned, the words "Commissioner of Deeds for the state of New York", and the name of the city, county, country, or other political subdivision in which they have been appointed to act, to authenticate their official acts. Such commissioners are appointed to act in a particular city or county (within the United States), or in a particular foreign country, and they may only act within the region to which they are appointed. They are authorized to take acknowledgments to be used or read into evidence within the State of New York; to administer oaths (the law does not specify that the administration of such oaths is restricted to documents to be used in New York); and, if appointed to act in a foreign country outside the United States, to certify copies of any records or patents, such certified copies to be read into evidence or used within the State of New York. The executive powers in New York are currently not appointing any out-of-state commissioners.

=== In Pennsylvania ===
Prior to July 1, 2003, the executive powers of the Commonwealth of Pennsylvania required that notaries public be residents of the state. Non-residents were appointed as Commissioners of Deeds, an essentially identical position. The law currently allows for any person maintaining a regular office located in Pennsylvania to be appointed as a Notary Public. Thus, the executive powers of the state are no longer accepting applications for commissioner appointments.

=== In West Virginia ===
The Governor of West Virginia has the power to appoint any person, residing in West Virginia or in any other U.S. state or territory, to take acknowledgments of deeds or other writings intended to be used or recorded in West Virginia. These commissioners may also take affidavits and depositions to be used in West Virginia. The commissioner's term of office is ten years, unless sooner removed by the Governor. Such commissioners are required to enter into a bond in the penalty sum of $1,000, and must pay an application fee of $100. Every commissioner must provide an official stamp or embossing seal containing his or her name, residence, and the words "Commissioner for West Virginia".

=== In Texas ===
The governor may biennially appoint and commission one or more individuals in other states, territories, or foreign countries or in the District of Columbia to serve as commissioner of deeds. An appointment may be made only on the recommendation of the executive authority of the state, territory, or foreign country or of the District of Columbia. The term of office of a commissioner of deeds is two years.

Before performing the duties of office, a commissioner of deeds shall take and subscribe an oath to well and faithfully perform the duties of office under the laws of this state. The oath shall be: (1) taken before the clerk of a court of record in the city, county, or country in which the commissioner resides; (2) certified to by the clerk under the clerk's hand and seal of office; and (3) filed in the office of the secretary of state of this state.

A commissioner of deeds shall provide a seal with a star of five points in the center and the words "Commissioner of the State of Texas" engraved on the seal. The seal shall be used to certify all official acts of the commissioner of deeds. An instrument that does not have the impression of the seal, or an act of the commissioner of deeds that is not certified by the impression of the seal, is not valid in this state. A commissioner of deeds has the same authority as a notary public to take acknowledgments and proofs of written instruments, to administer oaths, and to take depositions to be used or recorded in this state.
