= St. Philip's Church in the Highlands =

Historic church in New York, United States

- St. Philip's Church in the Highlands
- Location: Garrison, NY
- Address: 1101 Route 9D, Garrison, NY 10524
- Denomination: Episcopal Church
- Website: stphilipshighlands.org

Architecture
- Architect: Richard Upjohn

Clergy
- Rector: The Rev. Amanda Brayton Eiman

- St. Philip's Church in the Highlands
- U.S. National Register of Historic Places
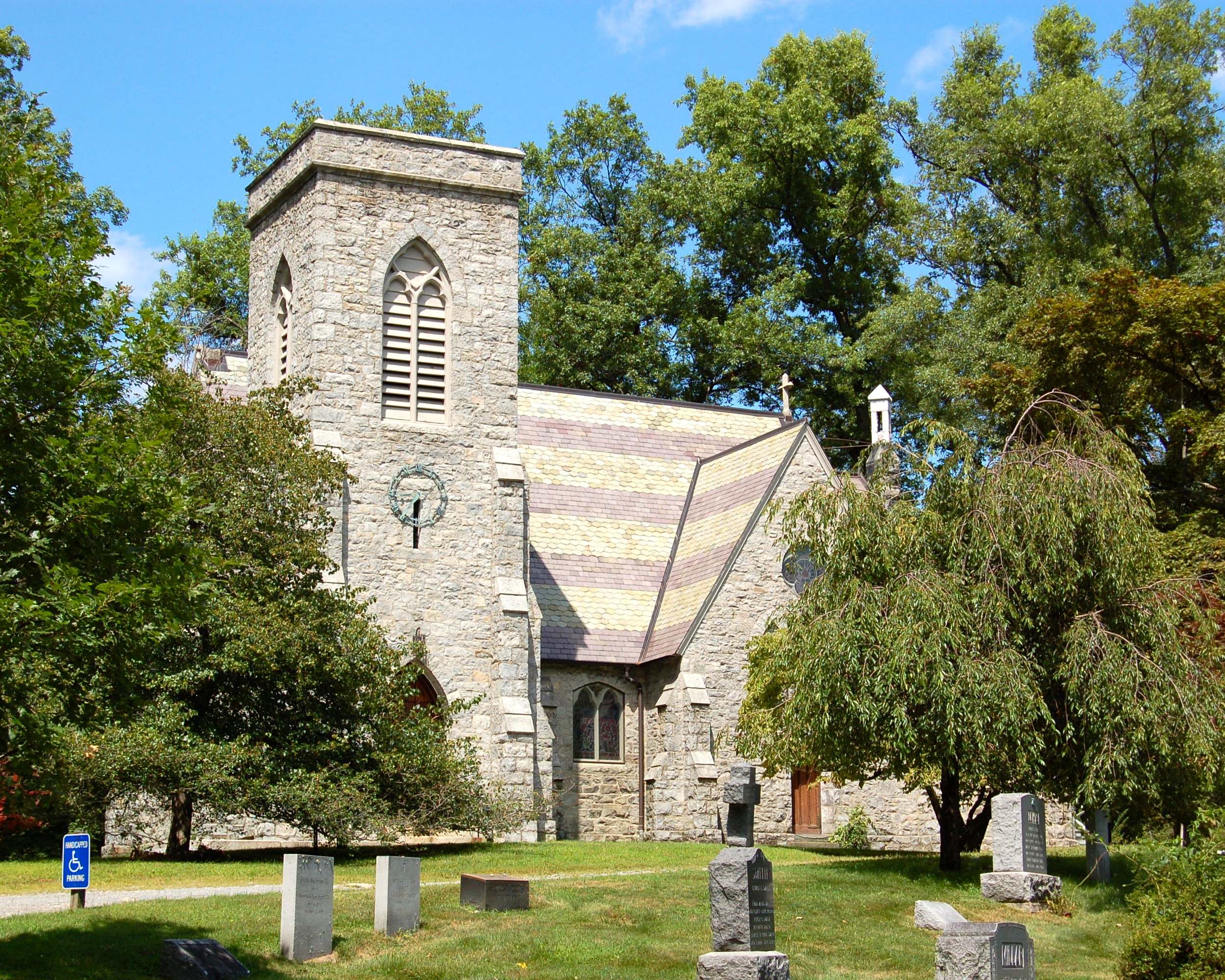
- Location: Garrison, NY
- Nearest city: Peekskill
- Coordinates: 41°22′55″N 73°56′19″W
- Area: 0 acres (0 ha)
- Built: 1861–1917
- Architect: Richard Upjohn
- Architectural style: Gothic Revival
- Website: www.stphilipshighlands.org
- MPS: Hudson Highlands Multiple Resource Area
- NRHP reference No.: 82005391
- Added to NRHP: October 11, 1995

St. Philip's Church in the Highlands is an Episcopal church located on New York State Route 9D in the hamlet of Garrison, New York, United States, within the town of Philipstown in the Hudson Highlands. It is a stone Gothic Revival building designed by Richard Upjohn, a congregant of the church, opened in 1865.

The church itself has a long and complex history, dating back to colonial times. Its development has paralleled and sometimes spurred that of the Garrison community itself, and it was accepted for listing on the National Register of Historic Places in 1982. However, the church itself objected, and it was not formally added to the Register until 1995.

== History ==
=== Colonial era and Revolution ===
The church was originally established ca. 1770 when St. Peter's Church in Peekskill was granted charter by King George III. The wardens, Beverley Robinson and Charles Moore, decided to establish a parish to the north, in the area known as Four Corners, to serve families in that area. After a short period in another church and a parishioner's home, a small wooden chapel was built where the present church stands. The current graveyard was also started at the same time. The new complex was possibly named St. Philip's in honor of the Philipse family, original patentees of the area and Robinson's in-laws.

The Rev. John Doty, the first rector of both churches, left for Nova Scotia after a few years as he was a staunch Loyalist in an area increasingly divided over revolutionary politics. Robinson, too, declined an invitation from his friend John Jay to swear allegiance to the newly created United States, and actively worked to support the British by organizing the Loyal American Legion and coordinating intelligence-gathering efforts. His lands and home were eventually confiscated by the new government of New York, and he left for England after the war, never to return.

A similar fate would befall half of St. Philip's families, and the church was so despised locally for its Tory associations that legend has it a mob came together to burn it down at one point during the later years. They were supposedly dissuaded from doing so by George Washington himself, who stood at the door and said "That, sir, is my church!" In gratitude the stained glass window in the church's vestibule depicts him.

=== Post-Revolution ===
For the first few years of American independence, the church lay vacant as it and the community began to rebuild. In 1786 William Denning, who had taken over from Robinson as both landowner and warden, had the altar and interior refurbished. Six years later the parish received its first new minister, the Rev. Andrew Fowler, who himself left after a few years to help establish the Episcopal Church in South Carolina.

Garrison Union Free School, erected for local families in the 1830s, still stands and has been moved across Route 9D. The church was rebuilt in 1837. In 1840, with Garrison and the church itself becoming populous enough to rival Peekskill and St. Peter's, the parish was separately incorporated. A board and batten rectory was built in 1854.

=== New building ===
A new pastor, the Rev. Charles Frederick Hoffman, arrived in May 1860. The completion of the Hudson River Railroad through nearby Garrison Landing had made the community more accessible to New York City and a desirable place to live for some of the most socially prominent families of the day, many of whom were congregants. Hoffman saw that the growing church needed a new building.

His congregation responded. Henry Belcher donated three acres (1.2 ha) for the building and grounds, and others raised $10,000 for its construction. The design came from another worshipper at St. Philip's, Richard Upjohn, already famous for Manhattan's Trinity Church. The new structure, a one-story Gothic Revival building of gray granite, was finished in 1861 and consecrated the next year.

In the decades afterwards, a carriage house and shed were built near the church. At the turn of the century, a parish house was built to the designs of George E. Harney and William S. Purdy, former residents of Cold Spring and architectural partners.

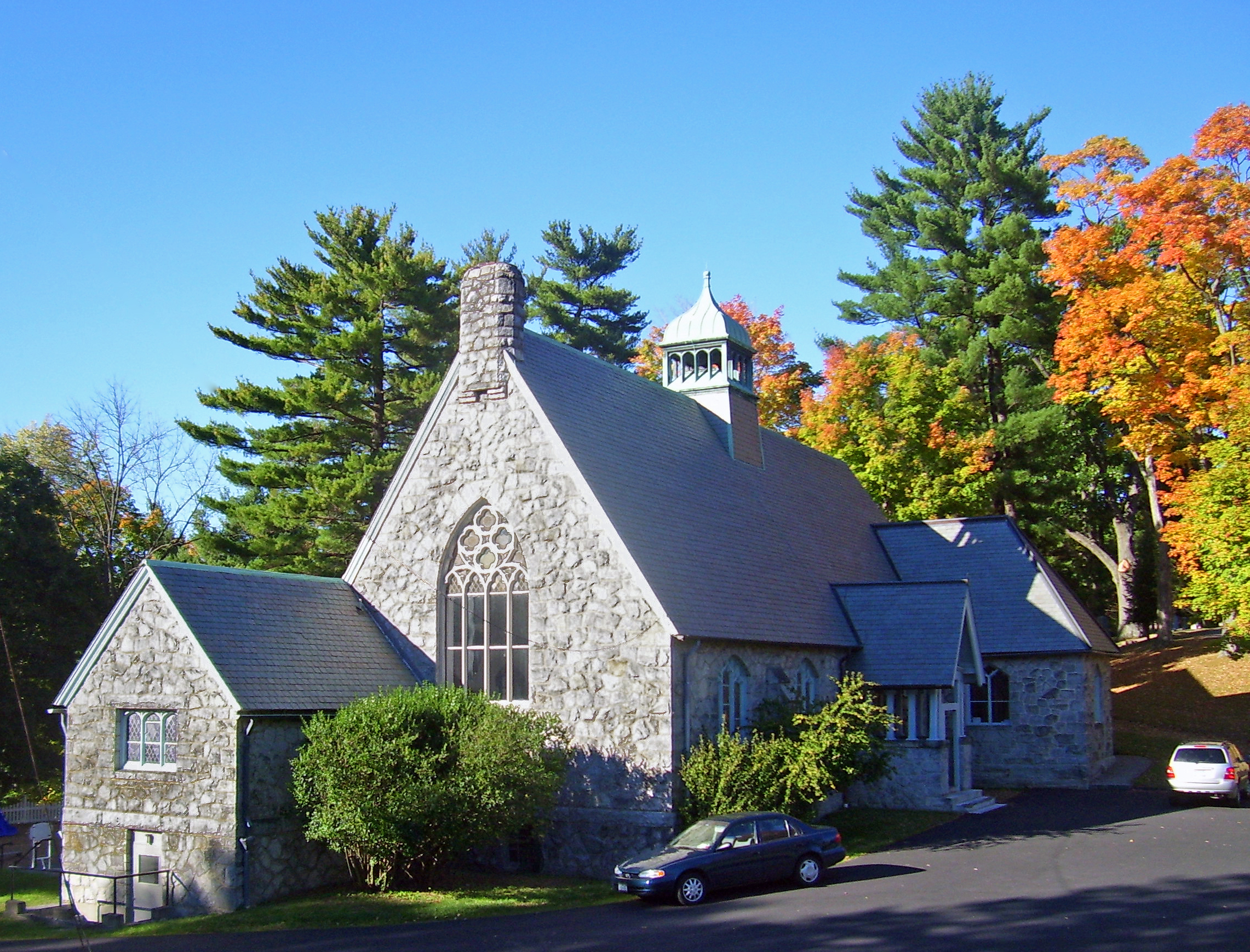
Parish Hall in 2007

=== 20th century ===
The early years of the 20th century would be marked by a bitter controversy within the church when a chapel established to the east of the mountains inland became first the site of a monastery and then home to the Graymoor Friars, who left Anglicanism for the Roman Catholic Church in 1909. St. Philip's insisted it retained title to the land (now at the junction of US Route 9, NY Route 403 and the Appalachian Trail) and it took an act of the state legislature to settle the dispute in favor of the friars. The animosity lingered for many years.

The year before the Friars left, St. Philip's had received a new rector, the Rev. Edward Clowes Chorley. He wrote a two-volume history of St. Philip's and other churches and would, years later, serve as editor-in-chief of Anglican & Episcopal History. While in Garrison he oversaw the installation of electricity and gas lighting in the building and the introduction of a boys' choir. Outside the church, Chorley oversaw the replacement of the original rectory in 1911, and then a sexton's house six years later. All are today considered contributing properties to the National Register listing. During this time, he also helped to found Garrison's volunteer fire department.

A kindergarten was later established at the church until it was moved into the expanded school facilities in the 1960s, when the nursery school program was established. William Reisman, who began a 27-year tenure as rector that same year, modernized and redecorated many of the buildings, adding protective covers for the stained-glass windows. He also began adult education classes at the church and updated Chorley's history to the 1970s.

Under his successor, Francis Geer, the church installed a new pipe organ and replaced the roof and interior floor of the parish house, used as a meeting for many of Garrison's community groups. A memorial garden was built north of it, to serve as a greeting area after services.
