= Edward Carson Waller =

Chicago real estate developer (1845–1931)

Edward Carson Waller (November 21, 1845 – January 13, 1931) was a Chicago developer and patron of Frank Lloyd Wright who pioneered development of subsidized low-income housing and some of the first skyscrapers in Chicago.

== Early life ==
Waller was born November 21, 1845. Around 1860, the family moved to the outskirts of Chicago, on a family estate now known as Buena Park. At age 24, Waller became close friends with future White City architect Daniel Burnham as they traveled to Nevada in 1869 to prospect for gold. While they did not get rich, the close friendship continued upon their return to Chicago.

== Associated developments ==
Waller co-founded the Central Safety Deposit Company and used his influence around the city to develop many famous Chicago buildings.

- In 1885, Waller developed and William Le Baron Jenney designed, the Home Insurance Building at the corner of LaSalle and Adams Street, the first building to use iron and steel skeleton construction.
- In 1889, Waller worked with Holabird & Root to develop the Tacoma Building, another early skyscraper.
- In association with the Central Safety Deposit Company, Waller collaborated with Burnham and Root to design and build the Rookery Building in 1888.
- In 1895, Waller worked with a young Frank Lloyd Wright to develop the Waller Apartments (1895) and the Francisco Terrace (1895). These facilities executed Waller's pioneering ideas for subsidized low income housing.
- As secretary and treasurer of the Central Safety Deposit association, Waller hired Frank Lloyd Wright to refurbish the Rookery Building in 1905.
- Waller's patronage of Wright continued for more than 20 years, to include Auvergne, his residence in River Forest, Illinois, and a bathing pavilion for his 3,000-acre (1,200 ha) property in Charlevoix, Michigan.
