= 1849 United States Senate election in New York =

- February 6, 1849

Majority vote of each house needed to win
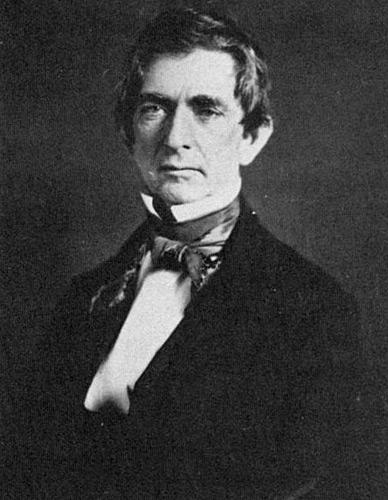

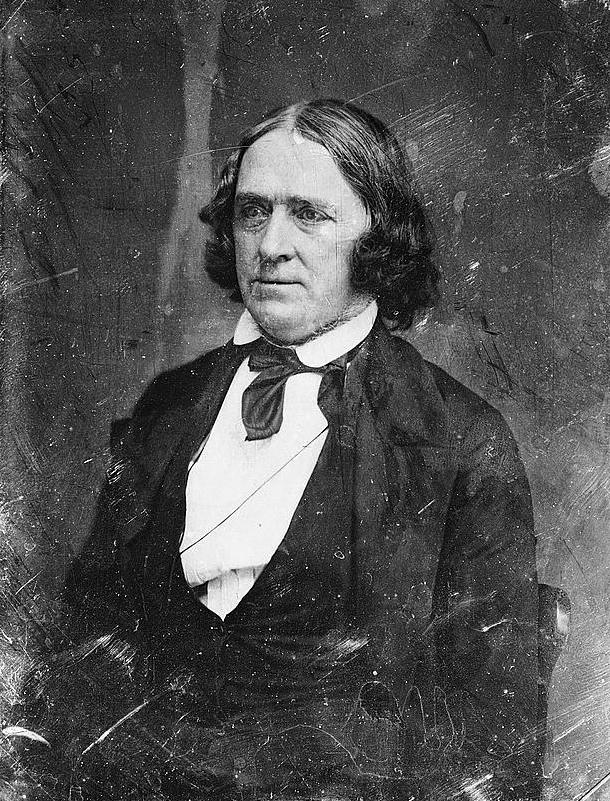

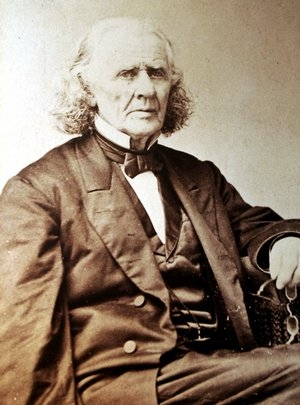

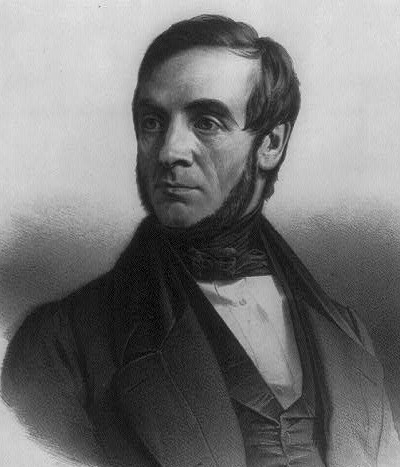
Nominee	William Seward	John Adams Dix
Party	Whig	Free Soil
Senate	18	6
Percentage	65.51%	20.69%
House	102	15
Percentage	82.26%	12.10%
Nominee	Reuben H. Walworth	Daniel D. Barnard
Party	Democratic	Whig
Senate	2	2
Percentage	6.90%	6.90%
House	7	—
Percentage	5.65%	—
Senator before election
John Adams Dix
Free Soil
Elected Senator
William Seward
Whig

The 1849 United States Senate election in New York was held on February 6, 1849, by the New York State Legislature to elect a U.S. senator (Class 3) to represent the State of New York in the United States Senate.

== Background ==
Barnburner John Adams Dix had been elected in 1845 to this seat after the resignation of Silas Wright, and Dix's term would expire on March 3, 1849. In November 1848, Dix was the Barnburners/Free-Soilers candidate for Governor of New York, but was defeated by Whig Hamilton Fish.

At this time the Democratic Party in New York was split in two fiercely opposing factions: the "Barnburners" and the "Hunkers". The Barnburners organized the Free Soil Party in 1848 and nominated Martin Van Buren for U.S. President. Due to the split, the Whig Party won most of the elective offices by pluralities.

At the State election in November 1847, 24 Whigs and 8 Democrats were elected for a two-year term (1848–1849) in the State Senate. At the State election in November 1848, 106 Whigs, 15 Free Soilers and 7 Hunkers were elected to the Assembly for the session of 1849. The 72nd New York State Legislature met from January 2 to April 11, 1849, at Albany, New York.

== Candidates ==
Ex-Governor of New York William H. Seward was nominated by a caucus of Whig State legislators on February 1, 1849. The vote was 88 for Seward, 12 for John A. Collier, 18 scattering and 4 blanks.

The incumbent U.S. Senator John Adams Dix ran for re-election supported by the Free Soilers.

Ex-Chancellor Reuben H. Walworth was the candidate of the Hunkers. Walworth had been third place in the last gubernatorial election, behind Fish and Dix.

Ex-Congressman Daniel D. Barnard (Whig) received 2 scattering votes in the Senate.

== Result ==
William H. Seward was the choice of both the Assembly and the Senate, and was declared elected.

1849 United States Senator election result
Office	House	Whig		Free Soil		Dem./Hunker		also ran	
U.S. Senator	State Senate (32 members)	William H. Seward	19	John Adams Dix	6	Reuben H. Walworth	2	Daniel D. Barnard	2
U.S. Senator	State Assembly (128 members)	William H. Seward	102	John Adams Dix	15	Reuben H. Walworth	7		

== Aftermath ==
Seward took his seat on March 5, 1849, and was re-elected in 1855. He remained in office until March 3, 1861, and two days later became U.S. Secretary of State, appointed by President Abraham Lincoln.

== See also ==
- United States Senate elections, 1848 and 1849

== Sources ==
- The New York Civil List compiled in 1858 (see: pg. 63 for U.S. Senators; pg. 136 for State Senators 1849; pg. 236ff for Members of Assembly 1849)
- Members of the 31st United States Congress
- Result State election, 1847: The Whig Almanac and United States Register for 1848
- Result Whig caucus: The American Whig Review, Vol. 11 by George Hooker Colton & James Davenport Whelpley (page 638)
- Result U.S. Senate election, State Senate: Journal of the Senate (72nd Session) (1849; pg. 167)
- Result U.S. Senate election, State Assembly: Journal of the Assembly (72nd Session) (1849; pg. 355f)
