= 1855 United States Senate election in New York =

- February 6, 1855

Majority vote of each house needed to win
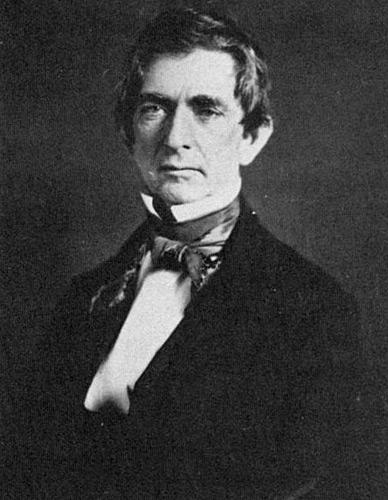

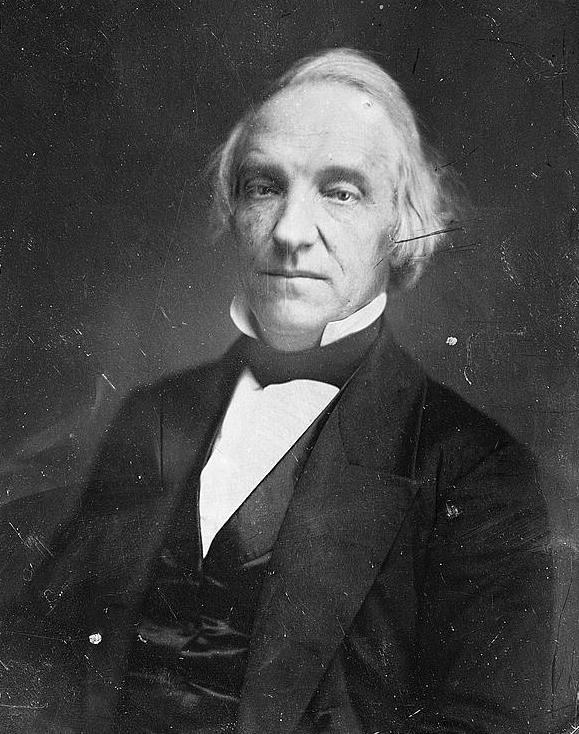

Nominee	William Seward	Daniel S. Dickinson	Horatio Seymour
Party	Whig	Democratic	Democratic
Alliance		Hards	Softs
Senate	18	5	0
Percentage	56.25%	15.62%	0.00%
House	69	14	12
Percentage	52.27%	10.61%	9.09%
Senator before election
William Seward
Whig
Elected Senator
William Seward
Whig

The 1855 United States Senate election in New York was held on February 6, 1855, by the New York State Legislature to elect a U.S. senator (Class 3) to represent the State of New York in the United States Senate.

== Background ==
William H. Seward had been elected in 1849 to this seat and his term would expire on March 3, 1855.

At the time the Democratic Party was split into two opposing factions: the "Hards" and the "Softs". After most of the "Barnburners" had left the party, joining the Whigs, the majority of "Hunkers" split over the question of reconciliation with the minority of Barnburners who had remained Democrats. The Hard faction (led by Daniel S. Dickinson) was against it, in true Hunker fashion claiming all patronage for themselves; the Soft faction (led by William L. Marcy), which included the former Barnburners, advocated party unity as a necessity to defeat the Whigs.

In 1854, the Republican Party was founded as a national party, but in New York the Whigs and the Anti-Nebraska Party ran concurrently at the State election. The unification of these occurred in New York only during the nomination convention for the State election in November 1855. Also running in the 1854 election were the American Party and nominees of the Temperance movement. In a general way, party lines were blurred until the re-alignment during the late 1850s after the disbanding of the American Party.

At the State election in November 1853, 23 Whigs, 7 Hards and 2 Softs were elected for a two-year term (1854–1855) in the State Senate. At the State election in November 1854, Whig State Senator Myron H. Clark was elected Governor of New York, and 82 Whigs, 26 Softs, 16 Hards and 3 Temperance men were elected for the session of 1855 to the New York State Assembly. "Know Nothings are sprinkled miscellaneously among Whigs, Hards and Softs; and exactly how many there are of these gentry in the Assembly Nobody Knows." The 78th New York State Legislature met from January 2 to April 14, 1855, at Albany, New York.

== Candidates ==
The incumbent U.S. Senator William H. Seward ran for re-election as a Whig.

== Election ==
In the Assembly, Seward received 69 votes, given by 65 Whigs; 1 Democrat; 1 Temperance man; 1 Republican and 1 Whig-Republican. Dickinson received 14 votes, given by 13 Democrats and 1 American. Horatio Seymour received the votes of 12 Democrats. Dix received 7 votes, given by 5 Democrats; 1 Independent Democrat and 1 Temperance man. Fillmore received 4 votes, given by 2 Whigs; 1 Democrat and 1 Temperance-American. Horatio Seymour Jr., received the votes of 2 Americans. King, Butler, Lester, Wait and Bronson received 1 Democratic vote each. Campbell received 1 Temperance-American vote. Howell received 1 American vote. Hoffman and Haven received 1 Whig vote each.

In the State Senate, Seward received 18 Whig votes, Dickinson 5 Hard votes, and Allen 2 Whig votes. Preston and Church received 1 Soft vote each. Hoffman, Babcock, Ullmann and Fillmore received 1 American vote each.

== Result ==
William H. Seward was the choice of both the Assembly and the Senate, and was declared elected.

1855 United States Senator election result
Office	Candidate	Party	Senate (32 members)	Assembly (128 members)
U.S. Senator	William H. Seward	Whig	18	69
	Daniel S. Dickinson	Dem./Hard	5	14
	Horatio Seymour	Dem./Soft		12
	Washington Hunt	Whig		9
	John Adams Dix	Dem./Soft		7
	Millard Fillmore	Whig	1	4
	William F. Allen	Democrat	2	
	Horatio Seymour Jr.			2
	Preston King		1	1
	Ogden Hoffman	Whig	1	1
	Daniel Ullmann	American	1	
	Sanford E. Church	Democrat	1	
	George R. Babcock	Whig	1	
	William W. Campbell	American		1
	Benjamin F. Butler	Democrat		1
	Albert Lester	Democrat		1
	Greene C. Bronson	Democrat		1
	Solomon G. Haven	Opposition		1
	John D. Howell			1
	L. or J. Wait			1

== Aftermath ==
Seward remained in the U.S. Senate until March 3, 1861, and two days later became U.S. Secretary of State, appointed by President Abraham Lincoln.

== Sources ==
- The New York Civil List compiled in 1858 (see: pg. 63 for U.S. Senators; pg. 137 for State Senators 1855; pg. 248ff for Members of Assembly 1855)
- Members of the 34th United States Congress
- STATE AFFAIRS; Election of a U.S. Senator for Six Years in NYT on February 7, 1855
- Result Senate: Journal of the Senate (78th Session) (1855; pg. 198)
