= 1851 United States Senate election in New York =

- February 4 – March 19, 1851

Majority vote of each house needed to win
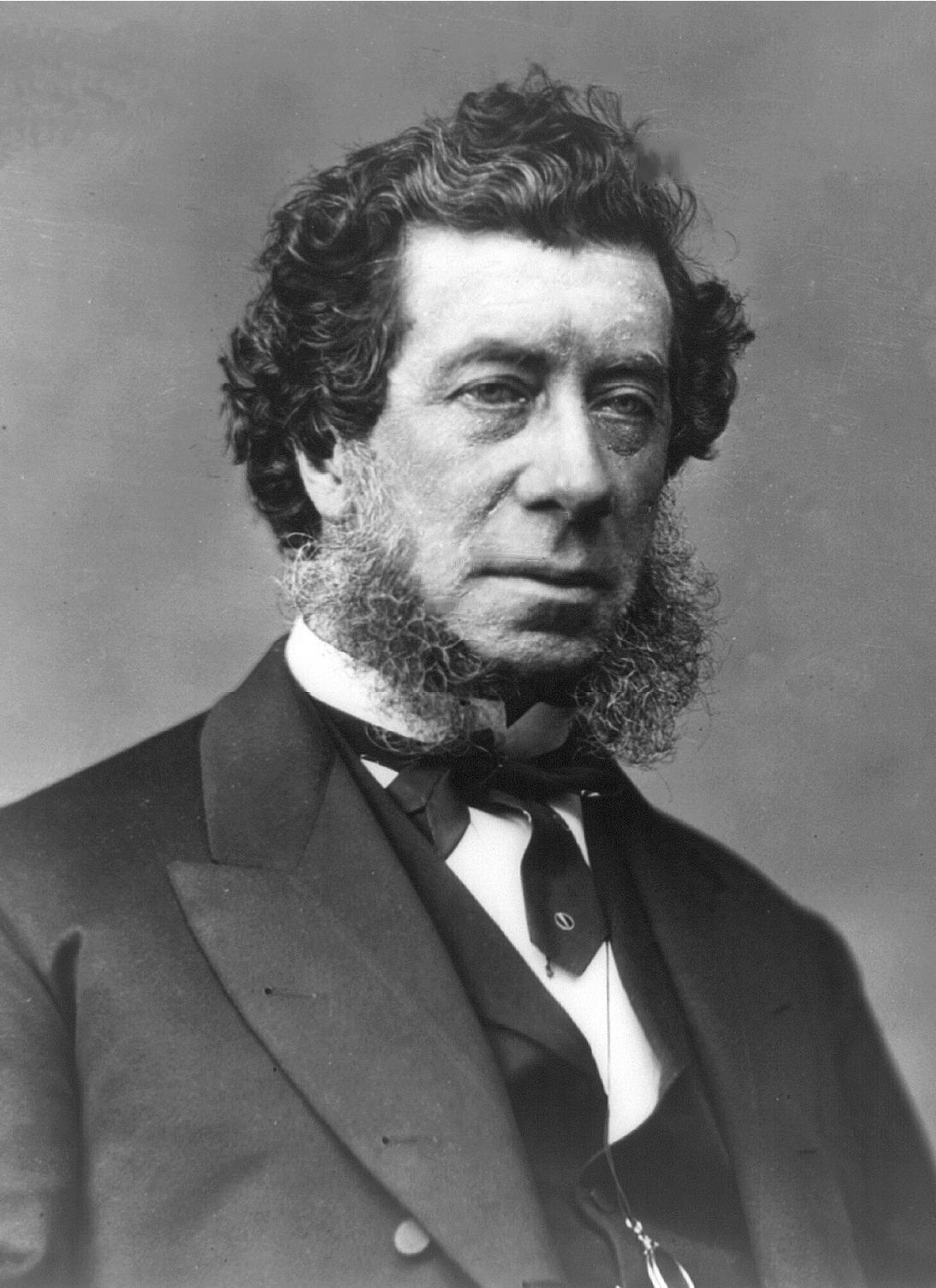

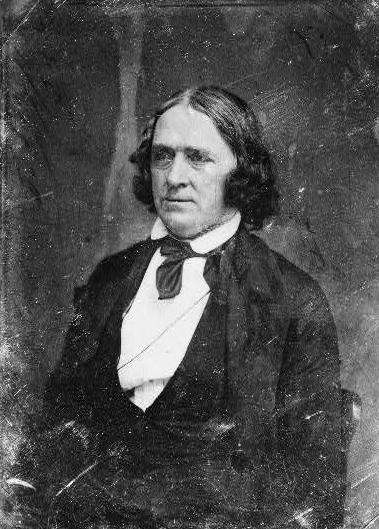
Nominee	Hamilton Fish	John Adams Dix
Party	Whig	Democratic
Alliance		Free Soil
Senate	16	6
Percentage	57.1%	42.9%
Assembly	68	6
Percentage	89.4%	10.6%
Senator before election
Daniel S. Dickinson
Democratic
Elected Senator
Hamilton Fish
Whig

The 1851 United States Senate election in New York was held on February 4 and March 18–19, 1851, by the New York State Legislature to elect a U.S. senator (Class 1) to represent the State of New York in the United States Senate.

== Background ==
Daniel S. Dickinson (Dem.) had been elected in 1845 to this seat, and his term would expire on March 3, 1851.

At this time the Whig Party in New York was split in two opposing factions: the Seward/Weed faction (the majority, opposed to the Compromise of 1850) and the "Silver Grays" (supporters of President Millard Fillmore and his compromise legislation, led by Francis Granger whose silver gray hair originated the faction's nickname). The opposing factions of the Democratic Party in New York, the "Barnburners" and the "Hunkers", had reunited at the State election in November 1850, and managed to have almost their whole State ticket elected, only Horatio Seymour was defeated for governor by a plurality of 262 votes.

At the State election in November 1849, 14 Seward Whigs, 3 Silver Gray Whigs and 15 Democrats were elected for a two-year term (1850–1851) in the State Senate. At the State election in November 1850, a Whig majority was elected to the Assembly for the session of 1851. The 74th New York State Legislature met from January 7 to April 17, and from June 10 to July 11, 1851, at Albany, New York.

== Candidates ==
Ex-Governor of New York Hamilton Fish was the candidate of the Whig Party.

== Election ==
Hamilton Fish belonged to the Seward/Weed faction, but was also a close friend of Henry Clay who was one of the leaders of the Fillmore faction in Washington, D.C. He was thus considered the only viable compromise candidate. The Silver Grays asked Fish to pledge his support for the Compromise, but Fish refused to make any comment, saying that he did not seek the office, and that the legislators should vote guided by Fish's known political history. Fish had earlier stated his opposition against the Fugitive Slave Law of 1850 but was believed to support most of the remainder of the Compromise. Nevertheless, Silver Gray State Senator James W. Beekman declared that he would not vote for Fish for personal reasons, a dislike stemming from the time when they were fellow students at Columbia University.

The State Legislature met on February 4, the legally prescribed day, to elect a U.S. Senator. In the Assembly, Fish received a majority of 78 to 49. In the State Senate the vote stood 16 for Fish and 16 votes for a variety of candidates, among them Beekman's vote for Francis Granger. After a second ballot with the same result, Beekman moved to adjourn, which was carried by the casting vote of the lieutenant governor, and no nomination was made.

On February 14, Senator George B. Guinnip offered a resolution to declare John Adams Dix elected to the U.S. Senate. On motion of Senator George R. Babcock, the resolution was laid on the table, i.e. consideration was postponed.

On February 15, Guinnip again offered a resolution to declare John Adams Dix elected to the U.S. Senate. Senator Stephen H. Johnson offered an amendment to this resolution, declaring Daniel S. Dickinson elected. On motion of Senator Marius Schoonmaker, the resolution was laid on the table too.

On March 18, when two Democratic State Senators were absent, having gone to New York City, the Whigs persuaded the Democrats in a 14-hour session to re-open the U.S. Senate election, and in the small hours of March 19 Fish was nominated by a vote of 16 to 12 (Beekman, Johnson [both Whigs], Thomas B. Carroll and William A. Dart [both Dem.] did not vote).

== Result ==
Fish was the choice of both the Assembly and the Senate, and was declared elected.

1851 United States Senator election result
Office	Candidate	Party	Senate (32 members) February 4 (first ballot)	Senate (32 members) February 4 (second ballot)	Assembly (128 members) February 4	Senate (32 members) March 19	Assembly (128 members) March 19
U.S. Senator	Hamilton Fish	Whig	16	16	78	16	68
	John Adams Dix	Democratic	1	1	29	6	6
	James T. Brady	Democratic			7		
	Horatio Seymour	Democratic	1	1	4	1	
	Francis Granger	Whig	1	1	2		1
	Aaron Ward	Democratic	1	1		1	
	Daniel S. Dickinson	Democratic	1	1		1	
	Arphaxed Loomis	Democratic	1	1		1	
	Amasa J. Parker	Democratic	1	1		1	
	David Buel Jr.	Democratic	1	1			
	Augustus C. Hand	Democratic	1	1			
	John Hunter	Democratic	1	1			
	John Fine	Democratic	1	1			
	Levi S. Chatfield	Democratic	1	1			
	John Tracy	Democratic	1	1			
	Abraham Bockee	Democratic	1	1			
	George Rathbun	Democratic	1	1			
	Timothy Jenkins	Democratic	1	1			
	William L. Marcy	Democratic			1		
	Washington Irving				1		
	John L. Riker				1		
	Erastus Corning	Democratic			1		
	Levi S. Chatfield	Democratic			1		
	George Wood				1		
	Daniel Lord				1		
	James S. Wadsworth	Democratic				1	
	William C. Bouck	Democratic					1

== Aftermath ==
Fish took his seat on December 1, 1851, and remained in office until March 3, 1857.

== See also ==
- United States Senate elections, 1850 and 1851

== Sources ==
- The New York Civil List compiled in 1858 (see: pg. 63 for U.S. Senators [gives wrong date for election "November 19"]; pg. 137 for state senators 1851; pg. 240ff for Members of Assembly 1851)
- Members of the 32nd United States Congress
- Hamilton Fish by Amos Elwood Corning (pages 35ff)
- Result Assembly: Journal of the Assembly (74th Session) (1851; Vol. I, pg. 268f and 662)
- Result Senate: Journal of the Senate (74th Session) (1851; pg. 136f and 322)
- The Papers of Henry Clay (Vol. 10; page 859)
- The Rise and Fall of the American Whig Party by Michael F. Holt (pages 649f)
