= John F. Rathbone =

American businessman and militia officer from Albany, New York (1819–1901)

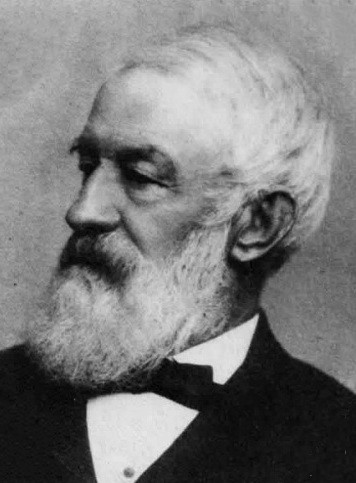
- Rathbone c. 1880
- Born: 18 October 1819; Albany, New York, US
- Died: 20 February 1901 (aged 81); Albany, New York, US
- Burial place: Albany Rural Cemetery, Menands, New York, US
- Alma mater: Brockport Collegiate Institute
- Spouse: Mary A. (Baker) Allen (m. 1844–1901)
- Children: 10
- Relatives: John Rathbone Oliver (grandson); Edward Bowditch (grandson)
- Military career
- Allegiance: United States; Union (American Civil War)
- Service: New York Militia
- Service years: 1861–1867; 1873–1875
- Rank: Major General
- Commands: 9th Brigade, 3rd Division; Albany Quartermaster Depot; Adjutant General of New York
- Wars: American Civil War
- Other work: Businessman

John F. Rathbone (18 October 1819 – 20 February 1901) was a businessman and militia officer from Albany, New York. A supporter of the Union during the American Civil War, he commanded the Albany Quartermaster Depot that was responsible for equipping and supplying United States Volunteers from New York before they departed for front lines. From 1873 to 1875, he served as Adjutant General of New York. In his civilian career, Rathbone operated a successful iron foundry.

== Early life ==
John Finley Rathbone was born in Albany, New York on 9 October 1819, a son of Valentine Wightman Rathbone and Nancy (Forsyth) Rathbone. He was educated The Albany Academy, then attended the Brockport Collegiate Institute. He left school after the 1833 death of his father; when the family moved to Rochester, New York, he obtained employment as a clerk in a local business. ln 1837 he returned to Albany, where he was first employed in the wholesale grocery business of his uncle Jared L. Rathbone, then became a clerk at the foundry of his uncle Joel Rathbone in South Albany. In 1840, Rathbone and his cousin Samuel H. Ransom, with backing from Joel and Jared Rathbone, became partners in a foundry and stove works.

== Career ==
Rathbone built a stove works in Albany in 1845 and it grew to become one of the largest in the world as the firm of Rathbone, Sard & Co. His business interests also included serving as president of the Mutual Fire Insurance Company of Albany. A supporter of the Union, in early 1861, Rathbone volunteered for military service and was appointed commander of the state militia's 9th Brigade with the rank of brigadier general. When the state government created three quartermaster depots, including the Albany Quartermaster Depot, to supply New York's contingent of United States Volunteers, Rathbone was appointed to command the depot in Albany as a brigadier general and worked closely with state quartermaster general Chester A. Arthur to ensure Union Army recruits were prepared before they left for the front lines. A Republican in politics, in 1864 he was the party's unsuccessful nominee for mayor. Rathbone remained in command of the depot until the end of the war; he had also maintained his command of the 9th Brigade, which he resigned in 1867.

When John A. Dix became governor on 1 January 1873, he appointed Rathbone as Adjutant General of New York with the rank of major general, succeeding Franklin Townsend, and he served until 1 January 1875. Rathbone was a founder of the Albany Orphan Asylum, and he was a member of the board of trustees and president for several years. He was also president of the Dudley Observatory's board of trustees. In addition, he served on Albany's park commission and was a trustee of the Albany Rural Cemetery. Long interested in education, Rathbone served as president of The Albany Academy board of trustees. Rathbone was a major financial supporter of the University of Rochester and served on its board of trustees for over 40 years, including 15 as vice president. With his brother Lewis, he also founded the university's Rathbone Historical Collection and Library Fund; he contributed $40,000 (almost $1.4 million in 2026) and served on the fund's board of trustees. Rathbone was a devout Baptist; in addition to serving as president of the board of trustees of Albany's Emmanuel Baptist Church, he was superintendent of its Sunday school for more than 50 years.

== Personal ==
In 1844, Rathbone married Mary A. (Baker) Allen. They were married until his death and were the parents of 10 children, five of whom lived to adulthood. Rathbone's daughter Marion was the wife of Robert Shaw Oliver. Their children included John Rathbone Oliver. His daughter Lucy was the wife of Edward Bowditch and they were the parents of Edward Bowditch.

Rathbone's Albany home was a mansion at 119 Washington Avenue that had formerly been owned by Governor William C. Bouck. In addition, he maintained a Berkshire Mountains summer home in Lenox, Massachusetts. Rathbone was stricken with influenza in March 1901; his health declined and he died at his home in Albany on 20 March. He was buried at Albany Rural Cemetery in Menands, New York.
