= 1843 United States Senate election in New York =

The 1843 United States Senate election in New York was held on February 7, 1843, by the New York State Legislature to elect a U.S. senator (Class 3) to represent the State of New York in the United States Senate.

== Background ==
Silas Wright, Jr., had been elected in 1833 to this seat after the resignation of William L. Marcy, and had been re-elected in 1837. Wright's term would expire on March 3, 1843.

At the State election in November 1842, Democrat William C. Bouck was elected Governor, 92 Democrats and 36 Whigs were elected to the assembly, and 8 Democrats and 1 Whig were elected to the state senate. The 66th New York State Legislature met from January 3 to April 18, 1843, at Albany, New York.

== Candidates ==
The incumbent U.S. Senator Silas Wright, Jr. was re-nominated unanimously by a Democratic caucus on the eve of the election.

Congressman Millard Fillmore was the candidate of the Whig Party.

== Result ==
Silas Wright, Jr., was the choice of both the Assembly and the Senate, and was declared elected.

1843 United States Senator election result
Office	Candidate	Party	Senate (32 members)	Assembly (128 members)
U.S. Senator	Silas Wright, Jr.	Democrat	17	77
	Millard Fillmore	Whig	6	16
	John A. Collier	Whig	1	6
	Willis Hall	Whig		4
	George W. Patterson	Whig		3
	George A. Simmons	Whig		2
	Luther Bradish	Whig	1	
	Gulian C. Verplanck	Whig		1

== Aftermath ==
Wright continued in the U.S. Senate, and remained in office until November 1844 when he resigned after his election as Governor of New York. Henry A. Foster was appointed to fill the vacancy temporarily, but the state legislature elected John A. Dix for the remainder of Wright's term.

== Sources ==
- The New York Civil List compiled in 1858 (see: pg. 63 for U.S. Senators; pg. 134 for state senators 1843; pg. 227f for Members of Assembly 1843)
- Members of the 28th United States Congress
- Political History of the State of New York, from Jan. 1, 1841, to Jan. 1, 1847; Vol. III by Jabez Delano Hammond (State election, 1842: pg. 311f; U.S. Senate election, 1843: pg. 349)
- Journal of the Assembly (66th Session) (1843; pg. 255f)
