= Edward Bowditch =

American lawyer

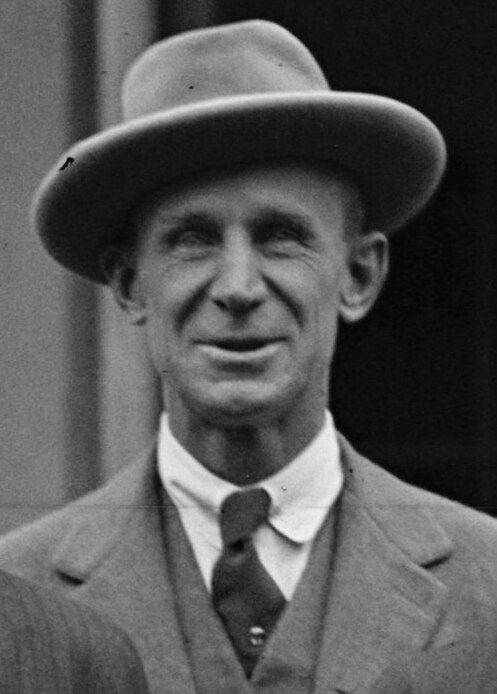
- Bowditch in 1925

Profile
- Position: End

Personal information
- Born: October 29, 1881; Albany, New York, U.S.
- Died: April 6, 1965 (aged 83); San Mateo, California, U.S.

Career information
- College: Harvard University (1901–1903)

Awards and highlights
- 2× Consensus All-American (1901, 1902); Second-team All-American (1903)

Edward "Pete" Bowditch, Jr. (October 29, 1881 – April 6, 1965) was an American football player, military officer, diplomat, and insurance broker.

He was a consensus All-American football player at Harvard in 1901 and 1902. He later had a distinguished military and diplomatic career, including stints as an observer in the Russo-Japanese War of 1904-1905, Secretary and Vice Governor of Moro Province in the Philippines, aide-de-camp to Gen. John J. Pershing during World War I, inspector general of the New York National Guard, and as a member of the Harbord Commission, charged with studying the relationship between Armenia and the United States, and the Wood-Forbes Mission that concluded in 1921 that Filipinos were not yet ready for independence from the United States.

Bowditch also worked for nearly 30 years as an insurance broker affiliated with The Equitable Life Assurance Society.

== Early life ==
Bowditch was born in Albany, New York on October 29, 1881, the son of Edward Bowditch and Lucy (Rathbone) Bowditch. He was the grandson of astronomer and mathematician Nathaniel Bowditch and businessman John F. Rathbone. He attended Groton School in Massachusetts.

Bowditch next attended Harvard College where he played football at the end position for the Harvard Crimson football team from 1901 to 1903. He was a consensus All-American in both 1901 and 1902. While attending Harvard College, Bowditch was listed as being six feet tall and weighing 173 pounds. He also played on Harvard's “second” baseball team and rowed on his class crew. After graduating from Harvard in 1903, Bowditch attended Harvard Law School and received his law degree in 1907.

== Military and diplomatic service ==
Bowditch had a long and distinguished career of military and diplomatic service. He was an observer during the Russo-Japanese War from 1904 to 1905. He served as secretary to Consul E. Morgan and was stationed near Port Arthur in Manchuria.

In 1909, he was named private secretary to William Cameron Forbes, the Governor General of the Philippines. He later served until 1914 as Secretary and Vice Governor of Moro Province on Mindanao. He also served for a short time as the Acting Governor of the Philippines when the Governor General, John J. Pershing, was recalled to the United States.

During World War I, he served in the United States Army in France. He held the rank of major and was the personal aide-de-camp to Gen. John J. Pershing. He received the Distinguished Service Order from the British government for his service in the war.

In 1919, Bowditch served as a member of the Harbord Commission, charged with studying the relationship between Armenia and the United States following World War I. In 1920, Bowditch left the U.S. Army infantry (having served in the 301st Infantry) and joined the U.S. Army Cavalry. He served as an officer in the Army's 5th and 12th Cavalry Regiments. In 1921, Bowditch was appointed as a member of the Wood-Forbes Mission charged by President Warren G. Harding with investigating conditions in the Philippines. The Commission concluded that Filipinos were not yet ready for independence from the United States, a finding that was widely criticized in the Philippines.

In 1924, Bowditch joined Gen. Pershing on a mission to Peru as part of the celebration of the centenary of the Battle of Ayacucho. In 1929, Bowditch was appointed as the Corps Area Civilian Aide to the Secretary of War, James William Good.

Bowditch left the Army and in the early 1930s and became a lieutenant colonel in the New York National Guard. In 1932, he became the division inspector of the New York National Guard in and was stationed at Camp Smith near Peekskill, New York. In 1940, Bowditch was involved in an investigation of the anti-Semitic Christian Front in connection with the theft of explosive cordite powder and 3,500 rounds of ammunition.

During World War II, he was restored to active service with the U.S. Army. In 1943, he retired from the Army and became the inspector general and chief of staff of the New York State Guard. Bowditch finally retired from military duty in October 1945 at age 64.

== Family and business career ==
In business, Bowditch was employed as an insurance broker and was associated with The Equitable Life Assurance Society for almost 30 years.

On June 8, 1926, Bowditch married Katherine Gabaudan Ross Goodlett (1879-1933), a poet and dancer from Kansas City, Missouri. They had one son, Edward Warwick David Bowditch (1927-1992). Katherine also had a daughter from her first marriage to Ralph Erskine Goodlett (1860-1936), Nicole Ross Goodlett (Desir) (1916-1996). Katherine was the daughter of John Alexander Ross (1850-1901), a native of Kentucky and graduate of Yale, who was an attorney in Kansas City, Missouri. He was a direct descendant of George Ross (1730-1779), who signed the Declaration of Independence as a member of the Pennsylvania delegation. Her mother was Marie Aleta Mansfield (1857-1930), a native of St. Joseph, Missouri, and graduate of Columbia College. Both Katherine and her mother were very intelligent and gifted women. Katherine died at the couple's home on Park Avenue on March 10, 1933, at age 54, despite the age listed in the headline of her obituary in The New York Times. She evidently misled her second husband into believing she was fifteen years younger than her actual age. She was born on February 24, 1879, and there are substantial records to that effect, including the marriage license application for her first marriage, which occurred on September 29, 1903, and a passport application she signed in 1899, listing her birth year as 1879. (If, in fact she was only 39 years old in 1933, she could hardly have married in 1903!)
