= 2028 United States Senate election in New York =

- November 7, 2028
Party	Democratic	Republican
Incumbent U.S. senator
Chuck Schumer
Democratic

The 2028 United States Senate election in New York will be held on November 7, 2028, to elect a member of the United States Senate to represent the state of New York. Democratic incumbent Chuck Schumer has filed paperwork to seek a sixth term.

Republicans have not won a Senate race in New York since 1992.

== Democratic primary ==
=== Candidates ===
==== Filed paperwork ====
- Heidi Cochran, community organizer
- Chuck Schumer, incumbent U.S. senator (1999–present)

==== Publicly expressed interest ====
- Chi Ossé, New York City councilmember from the 36th district (2022–present)
- Pat Ryan, U.S. representative for New York's 18th congressional district (2023–present)

==== Potential ====
- Alex Bores, state assemblymember from the 73rd district (2023–present)
- Andrew Cuomo, former governor of New York (2011–2021)
- Lina Khan, former chair of the Federal Trade Commission (2021–2025)
- Brad Lander, U.S. representative-elect for New York's 10th congressional district
- Alexandria Ocasio-Cortez, U.S. representative for New York's 14th congressional district (2019–present)
- James Skoufis, state senator from the 42nd district (2023–present)
- Ritchie Torres, U.S. representative for New York's 15th congressional district (2021–present)

==== Endorsements ====
Alexandria Ocasio-Cortez (undeclared)

U.S. senators

- Bernie Sanders, Vermont (2007–present) (Independent)

U.S. representatives

- Delia Ramirez, IL-03 (2023–present)

=== Fundraising ===
Campaign finance reports as of September 30, 2026
Candidate	Raised	Spent	Cash on hand
Chuck Schumer (D)	$3,950,604	$5,979,218	$7,853,430
Heidi Cochran (D)	$11,106	$10,070	$1,036
Source: Federal Election Commission

=== Polling ===
Hypothetical polling

Poll source	Date(s) administered	Sample size (Note: Key: A – all adults RV – registered voters LV – likely voters V – unclear)	Margin of error	Chuck Schumer	Alexandria Ocasio-Cortez	Undecided
Data For Progress (D)	March 26–31, 2026	767 (LV)	—	36%	55%	9%

== Republican primary ==
=== Candidates ===
==== Potential ====
- Mike Lawler, U.S. representative for New York's 17th congressional district (2023–present)
