= List of United States senators from New York =

Current delegation

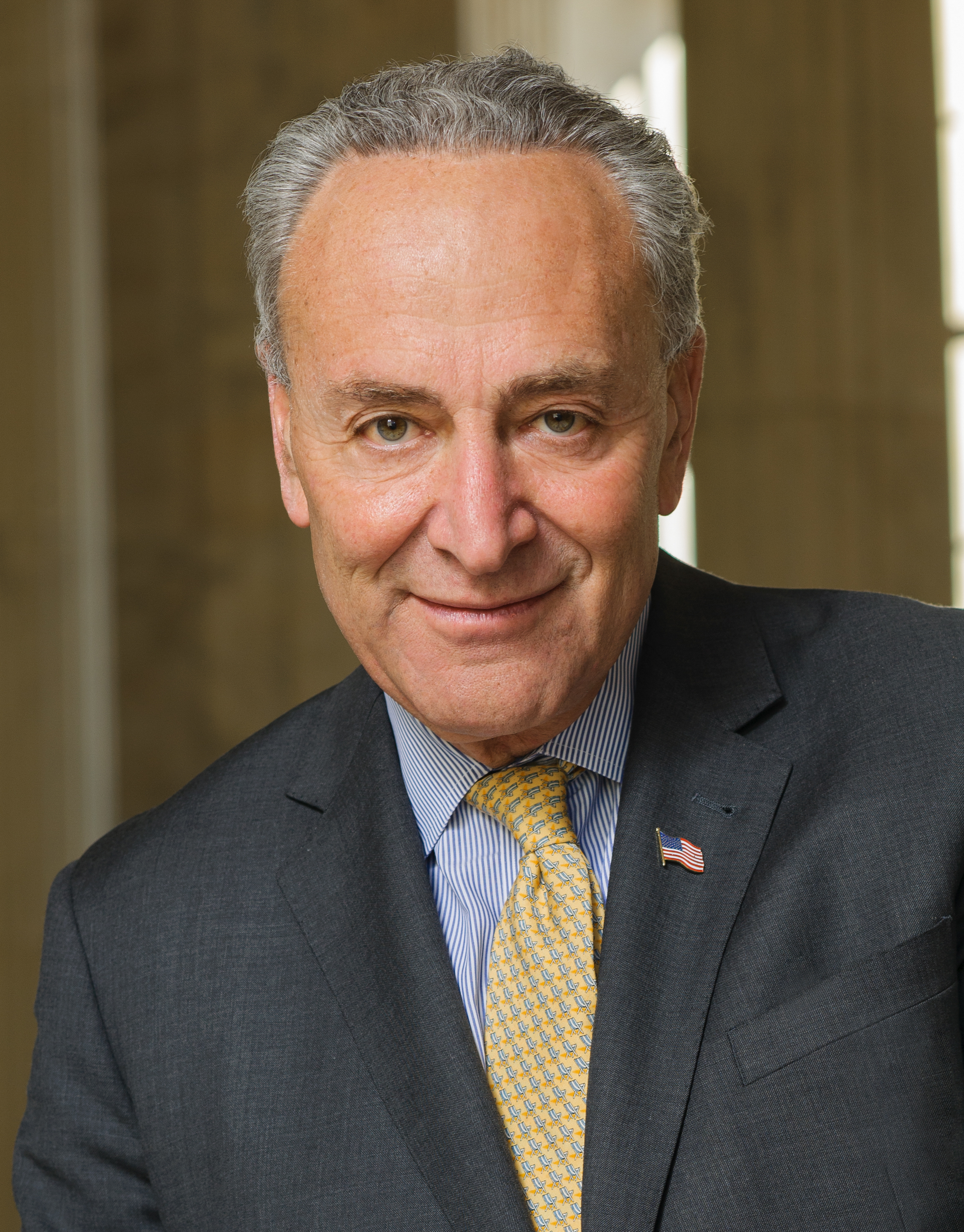
Chuck Schumer (D)

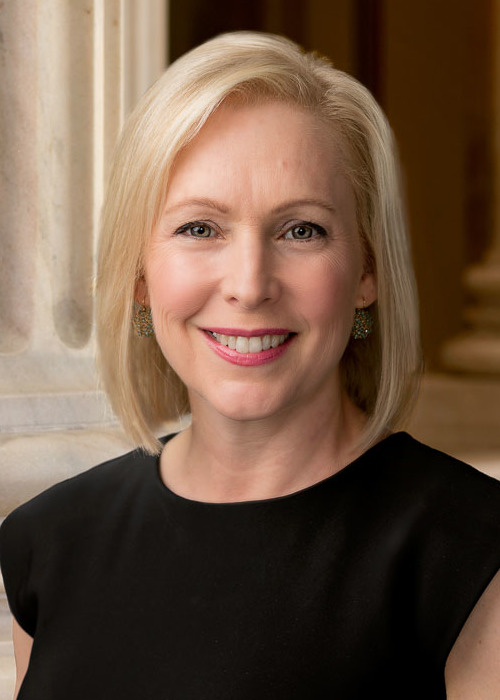
Kirsten Gillibrand (D)

(ordered by seniority)

Below is a list of U.S. senators who have represented the State of New York in the United States Senate since 1789. The date of the start of the tenure is either the first day of the legislative term (senators who were elected regularly before the term began), or the day when they took the seat (U.S. senators who were elected in special elections to fill vacancies, or after the term began). New York's current U.S. senators are Democrats Chuck Schumer (serving since 1999; also serving as Senate Democratic Leader since 2017) and Kirsten Gillibrand (serving since 2009).

Currently on his fifth term, Schumer is New York's longest serving senator.

== List of senators ==
Class 1 Class 1 senators belong to the electoral cycle that most recently had regular elections in 2006, 2012, 2018, and 2024. The next election will be in 2030.						C	Class 3 Class 3 senators belong to the electoral cycle that most recently had regular elections in 2004, 2010, 2016, and 2022. The next election will be in 2028.					
#	Senator	Party	Dates in office	Electoral history	T	C	T	Electoral history	Dates in office	Party	Senator	#
1	Philip Schuyler (Albany)	Pro- Admin.	Jul 27, 1789 – Mar 3, 1791	Elected in 1789. Lost re-election.	1	1st	1	Elected in 1789.	Jul 25, 1789 – May 23, 1796	Pro- Admin.	Rufus King (Jamaica)	1
2	Aaron Burr (New York)	Anti- Admin.	Mar 4, 1791 – Mar 3, 1797	Elected in 1791. Lost re-election.	2	2nd	1	Elected in 1789.	Jul 25, 1789 – May 23, 1796	Pro- Admin.	Rufus King (Jamaica)	1
2	Aaron Burr (New York)	Anti- Admin.	Mar 4, 1791 – Mar 3, 1797	Elected in 1791. Lost re-election.	2	3rd	1	Elected in 1789.	Jul 25, 1789 – May 23, 1796	Pro- Admin.	Rufus King (Jamaica)	1
2	Aaron Burr (New York)	Democratic- Republican	Mar 4, 1791 – Mar 3, 1797	Elected in 1791. Lost re-election.	2	4th	2	Re-elected in 1795. Resigned to become U.S. Minister to Great Britain.	Jul 25, 1789 – May 23, 1796	Federalist	Rufus King (Jamaica)	1
2	Aaron Burr (New York)	Democratic- Republican	Mar 4, 1791 – Mar 3, 1797	Elected in 1791. Lost re-election.	2	4th	2	Vacant	May 23, 1796 – Dec 8, 1796	Vacant		
2	Aaron Burr (New York)	Democratic- Republican	Mar 4, 1791 – Mar 3, 1797	Elected in 1791. Lost re-election.	2	4th	2	Elected to finish King's term. Resigned.	Dec 8, 1796 – Aug 1800	Federalist	John Laurance (New York)	2
3	Philip Schuyler (Albany)	Federalist	Mar 4, 1797 – Jan 3, 1798	Elected in 1797. Resigned due to ill health.	3	5th	2	Elected to finish King's term. Resigned.	Dec 8, 1796 – Aug 1800	Federalist	John Laurance (New York)	2
Vacant			Jan 3, 1798 – Jan 11, 1798	Vacant	3	5th	2	Elected to finish King's term. Resigned.	Dec 8, 1796 – Aug 1800	Federalist	John Laurance (New York)	2
4	John Sloss Hobart (New York)	Federalist	Jan 11, 1798 – Apr 16, 1798	Elected to finish Schuyler's term. Resigned to become federal judge.	3	5th	2	Elected to finish King's term. Resigned.	Dec 8, 1796 – Aug 1800	Federalist	John Laurance (New York)	2
Vacant			Apr 16, 1798 – May 5, 1798	Vacant	3	5th	2	Elected to finish King's term. Resigned.	Dec 8, 1796 – Aug 1800	Federalist	John Laurance (New York)	2
5	William North (Duanesburg)	Federalist	May 5, 1798 – Aug 17, 1798	Appointed to continue Schuyler's term. Successor elected.	3	5th	2	Elected to finish King's term. Resigned.	Dec 8, 1796 – Aug 1800	Federalist	John Laurance (New York)	2
6	James Watson (New York)	Federalist	Aug 17, 1798 – Mar 19, 1800	Elected to finish Schuyler's term. Resigned to become Naval Officer of the Port of New York.	3	5th	2	Elected to finish King's term. Resigned.	Dec 8, 1796 – Aug 1800	Federalist	John Laurance (New York)	2
6	James Watson (New York)	Federalist	Aug 17, 1798 – Mar 19, 1800	Elected to finish Schuyler's term. Resigned to become Naval Officer of the Port of New York.	3	6th	2	Elected to finish King's term. Resigned.	Dec 8, 1796 – Aug 1800	Federalist	John Laurance (New York)	2
Vacant			Mar 19, 1800 – May 3, 1800	Vacant	3	6th	2	Elected to finish King's term. Resigned.	Dec 8, 1796 – Aug 1800	Federalist	John Laurance (New York)	2
7	Gouverneur Morris (New York)	Federalist	May 3, 1800 – Mar 3, 1803	Elected to finish Schuyler's term. Lost re-election.	3	6th	2	Elected to finish King's term. Resigned.	Dec 8, 1796 – Aug 1800	Federalist	John Laurance (New York)	2
7	Gouverneur Morris (New York)	Federalist	May 3, 1800 – Mar 3, 1803	Elected to finish Schuyler's term. Lost re-election.	3	6th	2	Vacant	Aug 1800 – Nov 6, 1800	Vacant		
7	Gouverneur Morris (New York)	Federalist	May 3, 1800 – Mar 3, 1803	Elected to finish Schuyler's term. Lost re-election.	3	6th	2	Elected to finish King's term.	Nov 6, 1800 – Feb 5, 1802	Democratic- Republican	John Armstrong Jr. (Rhinebeck)	3
7	Gouverneur Morris (New York)	Federalist	May 3, 1800 – Mar 3, 1803	Elected to finish Schuyler's term. Lost re-election.	3	7th	3	Re-elected in 1801. Resigned.	Nov 6, 1800 – Feb 5, 1802	Democratic- Republican	John Armstrong Jr. (Rhinebeck)	3
7	Gouverneur Morris (New York)	Federalist	May 3, 1800 – Mar 3, 1803	Elected to finish Schuyler's term. Lost re-election.	3	7th	3	Vacant	Feb 5, 1802 – Feb 23, 1802	Vacant		
7	Gouverneur Morris (New York)	Federalist	May 3, 1800 – Mar 3, 1803	Elected to finish Schuyler's term. Lost re-election.	3	7th	3	Elected to finish Armstrong's term. Resigned.	Feb 23, 1802 – Nov 4, 1803	Democratic- Republican	DeWitt Clinton (New York)	4
8	Theodorus Bailey (Poughkeepsie)	Democratic- Republican	Mar 4, 1803 – Jan 16, 1804	Elected in 1803. Resigned.	4	8th	3	Elected to finish Armstrong's term. Resigned.	Feb 23, 1802 – Nov 4, 1803	Democratic- Republican	DeWitt Clinton (New York)	4
8	Theodorus Bailey (Poughkeepsie)	Democratic- Republican	Mar 4, 1803 – Jan 16, 1804	Elected in 1803. Resigned.	4	8th	3	Vacant	Nov 4, 1803 – Dec 8, 1803	Vacant		
8	Theodorus Bailey (Poughkeepsie)	Democratic- Republican	Mar 4, 1803 – Jan 16, 1804	Elected in 1803. Resigned.	4	8th	3	Appointed to continue his own term. Resigned; Elected to the class 1 seat.	Dec 8, 1803 – Feb 23, 1804	Democratic- Republican	John Armstrong Jr. (Rhinebeck)	5
Vacant			Jan 16, 1804 – Feb 25, 1804	Vacant	4	8th	3	Appointed to continue his own term. Resigned; Elected to the class 1 seat.	Dec 8, 1803 – Feb 23, 1804	Democratic- Republican	John Armstrong Jr. (Rhinebeck)	5
Vacant			Jan 16, 1804 – Feb 25, 1804	Vacant	4	8th	3	Elected to finish Armstrong's term.	Feb 23, 1804 – Mar 3, 1813	Democratic- Republican	John Smith (Mastic Beach)	6
9	John Armstrong Jr. (Rhinebeck)	Democratic- Republican	Feb 25, 1804 – Jun 30, 1804	Elected to finish Bailey's term. Resigned to become U.S. Minister to France.	4	8th	3	Elected to finish Armstrong's term.	Feb 23, 1804 – Mar 3, 1813	Democratic- Republican	John Smith (Mastic Beach)	6
Vacant			Jun 30, 1804 – Nov 23, 1804	Vacant	4	8th	3	Elected to finish Armstrong's term.	Feb 23, 1804 – Mar 3, 1813	Democratic- Republican	John Smith (Mastic Beach)	6
10	Samuel L. Mitchill (New York)	Democratic- Republican	Nov 23, 1804 – Mar 3, 1809	Elected to finish Armstrong's term. Lost re-election.	4	8th	3	Elected to finish Armstrong's term.	Feb 23, 1804 – Mar 3, 1813	Democratic- Republican	John Smith (Mastic Beach)	6
10	Samuel L. Mitchill (New York)	Democratic- Republican	Nov 23, 1804 – Mar 3, 1809	Elected to finish Armstrong's term. Lost re-election.	4	9th	3	Elected to finish Armstrong's term.	Feb 23, 1804 – Mar 3, 1813	Democratic- Republican	John Smith (Mastic Beach)	6
10	Samuel L. Mitchill (New York)	Democratic- Republican	Nov 23, 1804 – Mar 3, 1809	Elected to finish Armstrong's term. Lost re-election.	4	10th	4	Re-elected in 1807. Retired or lost re-election.	Feb 23, 1804 – Mar 3, 1813	Democratic- Republican	John Smith (Mastic Beach)	6
11	Obadiah German (Norwich)	Democratic- Republican	Mar 4, 1809 – Mar 3, 1815	Elected in 1809. Retired.	5	11th	4	Re-elected in 1807. Retired or lost re-election.	Feb 23, 1804 – Mar 3, 1813	Democratic- Republican	John Smith (Mastic Beach)	6
11	Obadiah German (Norwich)	Democratic- Republican	Mar 4, 1809 – Mar 3, 1815	Elected in 1809. Retired.	5	12th	4	Re-elected in 1807. Retired or lost re-election.	Feb 23, 1804 – Mar 3, 1813	Democratic- Republican	John Smith (Mastic Beach)	6
11	Obadiah German (Norwich)	Democratic- Republican	Mar 4, 1809 – Mar 3, 1815	Elected in 1809. Retired.	5	13th	5	Elected in 1813. Legislature failed to elect.	Mar 4, 1813 – Mar 3, 1819	Federalist	Rufus King (New York)	7
12	Nathan Sanford (New York)	Democratic- Republican	Mar 4, 1815 – Mar 3, 1821	Elected in 1815. Lost re-election.	6	14th	5	Elected in 1813. Legislature failed to elect.	Mar 4, 1813 – Mar 3, 1819	Federalist	Rufus King (New York)	7
12	Nathan Sanford (New York)	Democratic- Republican	Mar 4, 1815 – Mar 3, 1821	Elected in 1815. Lost re-election.	6	15th	5	Elected in 1813. Legislature failed to elect.	Mar 4, 1813 – Mar 3, 1819	Federalist	Rufus King (New York)	7
12	Nathan Sanford (New York)	Democratic- Republican	Mar 4, 1815 – Mar 3, 1821	Elected in 1815. Lost re-election.	6	16th	6	Vacant	Mar 4, 1819 – Jan 25, 1820	Vacant		7
12	Nathan Sanford (New York)	Democratic- Republican	Mar 4, 1815 – Mar 3, 1821	Elected in 1815. Lost re-election.	6	16th	6	Re-elected late. Retired.	Jan 25, 1820 – Mar 3, 1825	Federalist	Rufus King (New York)	7
13	Martin Van Buren (Albany)	Democratic- Republican /Bucktail	Mar 4, 1821 – Dec 20, 1828	Elected in 1821.	7	17th	6	Re-elected late. Retired.	Jan 25, 1820 – Mar 3, 1825	Federalist	Rufus King (New York)	7
13	Martin Van Buren (Albany)	Democratic- Republican /Bucktail	Mar 4, 1821 – Dec 20, 1828	Elected in 1821.	7	18th	6	Re-elected late. Retired.	Jan 25, 1820 – Mar 3, 1825	Federalist	Rufus King (New York)	7
13	Martin Van Buren (Albany)	Democratic	Mar 4, 1821 – Dec 20, 1828	Elected in 1821.	7	19th	7	Legislature failed to elect.	Mar 4, 1825 – Jan 31, 1826	Vacant		
13	Martin Van Buren (Albany)	Democratic	Mar 4, 1821 – Dec 20, 1828	Elected in 1821.	7	19th	7	Elected late. Retired.	Jan 31, 1826 – Mar 3, 1831	National; Republican	Nathan Sanford (Albany)	8
13	Martin Van Buren (Albany)	Democratic	Mar 4, 1821 – Dec 20, 1828	Re-elected in 1827. Resigned to become N.Y. Governor.	8	20th	7	Elected late. Retired.	Jan 31, 1826 – Mar 3, 1831	National; Republican	Nathan Sanford (Albany)	8
Vacant			Dec 20, 1828 – Jan 15, 1829	Vacant	8	20th	7	Elected late. Retired.	Jan 31, 1826 – Mar 3, 1831	National; Republican	Nathan Sanford (Albany)	8
14	Charles E. Dudley (Albany)	Jacksonian	Jan 15, 1829 – Mar 3, 1833	Elected to finish Van Buren's term. Retired.	8	20th	7	Elected late. Retired.	Jan 31, 1826 – Mar 3, 1831	National; Republican	Nathan Sanford (Albany)	8
14	Charles E. Dudley (Albany)	Jacksonian	Jan 15, 1829 – Mar 3, 1833	Elected to finish Van Buren's term. Retired.	8	21st	7	Elected late. Retired.	Jan 31, 1826 – Mar 3, 1831	National; Republican	Nathan Sanford (Albany)	8
14	Charles E. Dudley (Albany)	Jacksonian	Jan 15, 1829 – Mar 3, 1833	Elected to finish Van Buren's term. Retired.	8	22nd	8	Elected in 1831. Resigned; elected N.Y. Governor.	Mar 4, 1831 – Jan 1, 1833	Jacksonian	William L. Marcy (Albany)	9
14	Charles E. Dudley (Albany)	Jacksonian	Jan 15, 1829 – Mar 3, 1833	Elected to finish Van Buren's term. Retired.	8	22nd	8	Vacant	Jan 1, 1833 – Jan 14, 1833	Vacant		
14	Charles E. Dudley (Albany)	Jacksonian	Jan 15, 1829 – Mar 3, 1833	Elected to finish Van Buren's term. Retired.	8	22nd	8	Elected to finish Marcy's term.	Jan 4, 1833 – Nov 26, 1844	Jacksonian	Silas Wright Jr. (Canton)	10
15	Nathaniel P. Tallmadge (Poughkeepsie)	Jacksonian	Mar 4, 1833 – Mar 3, 1839	Elected in 1833. Legislature failed to re-elect.	9	23rd	8	Elected to finish Marcy's term.	Jan 4, 1833 – Nov 26, 1844	Jacksonian	Silas Wright Jr. (Canton)	10
15	Nathaniel P. Tallmadge (Poughkeepsie)	Jacksonian	Mar 4, 1833 – Mar 3, 1839	Elected in 1833. Legislature failed to re-elect.	9	24th	8	Elected to finish Marcy's term.	Jan 4, 1833 – Nov 26, 1844	Jacksonian	Silas Wright Jr. (Canton)	10
15	Nathaniel P. Tallmadge (Poughkeepsie)	Democratic	Mar 4, 1833 – Mar 3, 1839	Elected in 1833. Legislature failed to re-elect.	9	25th	9	Re-elected in 1837.	Jan 4, 1833 – Nov 26, 1844	Democratic	Silas Wright Jr. (Canton)	10
15	Vacant		Mar 4, 1839 – Jan 27, 1840	Vacant	10	26th	9	Re-elected in 1837.	Jan 4, 1833 – Nov 26, 1844	Democratic	Silas Wright Jr. (Canton)	10
15	Nathaniel P. Tallmadge (Poughkeepsie)	Whig	Jan 27, 1840 – Jun 17, 1844	Elected late. Resigned to become Governor of Wisconsin Territory.	10	26th	9	Re-elected in 1837.	Jan 4, 1833 – Nov 26, 1844	Democratic	Silas Wright Jr. (Canton)	10
15	Nathaniel P. Tallmadge (Poughkeepsie)	Whig	Jan 27, 1840 – Jun 17, 1844	Elected late. Resigned to become Governor of Wisconsin Territory.	10	27th	9	Re-elected in 1837.	Jan 4, 1833 – Nov 26, 1844	Democratic	Silas Wright Jr. (Canton)	10
15	Nathaniel P. Tallmadge (Poughkeepsie)	Whig	Jan 27, 1840 – Jun 17, 1844	Elected late. Resigned to become Governor of Wisconsin Territory.	10	28th	10	Re-elected in 1843. Resigned when elected N.Y. Governor.	Jan 4, 1833 – Nov 26, 1844	Democratic	Silas Wright Jr. (Canton)	10
Vacant			Jun 17, 1844 – Dec 9, 1844	Vacant	10	28th	10	Re-elected in 1843. Resigned when elected N.Y. Governor.	Jan 4, 1833 – Nov 26, 1844	Democratic	Silas Wright Jr. (Canton)	10
Vacant			Jun 17, 1844 – Dec 9, 1844	Vacant	10	28th	10	Vacant	Nov 26, 1844 – Nov 30, 1844	Vacant		
Vacant			Jun 17, 1844 – Dec 9, 1844	Vacant	10	28th	10	Appointed to continue Wright's term. Lost election for remainder of Wright's term.	Nov 30, 1844 – Jan 27, 1845	Democratic	Henry A. Foster (Rome)	11
16	Daniel S. Dickinson (Binghamton)	Democratic	Dec 9, 1844 – Mar 3, 1851	Appointed to continue Tallmadge's term. Elected to finish Tallmadge's term.	10	28th	10	Appointed to continue Wright's term. Lost election for remainder of Wright's term.	Nov 30, 1844 – Jan 27, 1845	Democratic	Henry A. Foster (Rome)	11
16	Daniel S. Dickinson (Binghamton)	Democratic	Dec 9, 1844 – Mar 3, 1851	Appointed to continue Tallmadge's term. Elected to finish Tallmadge's term.	10	28th	10	Elected to finish Wright's term. Lost re-election.	Jan 27, 1845 – Mar 3, 1849	Democratic	John Adams Dix (Albany)	12
16	Daniel S. Dickinson (Binghamton)	Democratic	Dec 9, 1844 – Mar 3, 1851	Elected to full term in 1845. Lost re-election.	11	29th	10	Elected to finish Wright's term. Lost re-election.	Jan 27, 1845 – Mar 3, 1849	Democratic	John Adams Dix (Albany)	12
16	Daniel S. Dickinson (Binghamton)	Democratic	Dec 9, 1844 – Mar 3, 1851	Elected to full term in 1845. Lost re-election.	11	30th	10	Elected to finish Wright's term. Lost re-election.	Jan 27, 1845 – Mar 3, 1849	Democratic	John Adams Dix (Albany)	12
16	Daniel S. Dickinson (Binghamton)	Democratic	Dec 9, 1844 – Mar 3, 1851	Elected to full term in 1845. Lost re-election.	11	31st	11	Elected in 1849.	Mar 4, 1849 – Mar 3, 1861	Whig	William H. Seward (Auburn)	13
Vacant			Mar 4, 1851 – Dec 1, 1851	Vacant	12	32nd	11	Elected in 1849.	Mar 4, 1849 – Mar 3, 1861	Whig	William H. Seward (Auburn)	13
17	Hamilton Fish (New York)	Whig	Dec 1, 1851 – Mar 3, 1857	Elected late. Retired.	12	32nd	11	Elected in 1849.	Mar 4, 1849 – Mar 3, 1861	Whig	William H. Seward (Auburn)	13
17	Hamilton Fish (New York)	Whig	Dec 1, 1851 – Mar 3, 1857	Elected late. Retired.	12	33rd	11	Elected in 1849.	Mar 4, 1849 – Mar 3, 1861	Whig	William H. Seward (Auburn)	13
17	Hamilton Fish (New York)	Whig	Dec 1, 1851 – Mar 3, 1857	Elected late. Retired.	12	34th	12	Re-elected in 1855. Retired to become Secretary of State	Mar 4, 1849 – Mar 3, 1861	Republican (Note: William H. Seward was re-elected in 1855 as a Whig, but became a Republican shortly thereafter.)	William H. Seward (Auburn)	13
18	Preston King (Ogdensburg)	Republican	Mar 4, 1857 – Mar 3, 1863	Elected in 1857. Lost renomination.	13	35th	12	Re-elected in 1855. Retired to become Secretary of State	Mar 4, 1849 – Mar 3, 1861	Republican	William H. Seward (Auburn)	13
18	Preston King (Ogdensburg)	Republican	Mar 4, 1857 – Mar 3, 1863	Elected in 1857. Lost renomination.	13	36th	12	Re-elected in 1855. Retired to become Secretary of State	Mar 4, 1849 – Mar 3, 1861	Republican	William H. Seward (Auburn)	13
18	Preston King (Ogdensburg)	Republican	Mar 4, 1857 – Mar 3, 1863	Elected in 1857. Lost renomination.	13	37th	13	Elected in 1861. Lost re-nomination.	Mar 4, 1861 – Mar 3, 1867	Republican	Ira Harris (Albany)	14
19	Edwin D. Morgan (New York)	Republican	Mar 4, 1863 – Mar 3, 1869	Elected in 1863. Lost re-nomination.	14	38th	13	Elected in 1861. Lost re-nomination.	Mar 4, 1861 – Mar 3, 1867	Republican	Ira Harris (Albany)	14
19	Edwin D. Morgan (New York)	Republican	Mar 4, 1863 – Mar 3, 1869	Elected in 1863. Lost re-nomination.	14	39th	13	Elected in 1861. Lost re-nomination.	Mar 4, 1861 – Mar 3, 1867	Republican	Ira Harris (Albany)	14
19	Edwin D. Morgan (New York)	Republican	Mar 4, 1863 – Mar 3, 1869	Elected in 1863. Lost re-nomination.	14	40th	14	Elected in 1867.	Mar 4, 1867 – May 16, 1881	Republican	Roscoe Conkling (Utica)	15
20	Reuben Fenton (Jamestown)	Republican	Mar 4, 1869 – Mar 3, 1875	Elected in 1869. Not an active candidate for renomination in 1875.	15	41st	14	Elected in 1867.	Mar 4, 1867 – May 16, 1881	Republican	Roscoe Conkling (Utica)	15
20	Reuben Fenton (Jamestown)	Republican	Mar 4, 1869 – Mar 3, 1875	Elected in 1869. Not an active candidate for renomination in 1875.	15	42nd	14	Elected in 1867.	Mar 4, 1867 – May 16, 1881	Republican	Roscoe Conkling (Utica)	15
20	Reuben Fenton (Jamestown)	Liberal Republican	Mar 4, 1869 – Mar 3, 1875	Elected in 1869. Not an active candidate for renomination in 1875.	15	42nd	14	Elected in 1867.	Mar 4, 1867 – May 16, 1881	Republican	Roscoe Conkling (Utica)	15
20	Reuben Fenton (Jamestown)	Republican	Mar 4, 1869 – Mar 3, 1875	Elected in 1869. Not an active candidate for renomination in 1875.	15	43rd	15	Re-elected in 1873.	Mar 4, 1867 – May 16, 1881	Republican	Roscoe Conkling (Utica)	15
21	Francis Kernan (Utica)	Democratic	Mar 4, 1875 – Mar 3, 1881	Elected in 1875. Lost re-election.	16	44th	15	Re-elected in 1873.	Mar 4, 1867 – May 16, 1881	Republican	Roscoe Conkling (Utica)	15
21	Francis Kernan (Utica)	Democratic	Mar 4, 1875 – Mar 3, 1881	Elected in 1875. Lost re-election.	16	45th	15	Re-elected in 1873.	Mar 4, 1867 – May 16, 1881	Republican	Roscoe Conkling (Utica)	15
21	Francis Kernan (Utica)	Democratic	Mar 4, 1875 – Mar 3, 1881	Elected in 1875. Lost re-election.	16	46th	16	Re-elected in 1879. Resigned.	Mar 4, 1867 – May 16, 1881	Republican	Roscoe Conkling (Utica)	15
22	Thomas C. Platt (Owego)	Republican	Mar 4, 1881 – May 16, 1881	Elected in 1881. Resigned.	17	47th	16	Re-elected in 1879. Resigned.	Mar 4, 1867 – May 16, 1881	Republican	Roscoe Conkling (Utica)	15
Vacant			May 16, 1881 – Jul 27, 1881	Vacant	17	47th	16	Vacant	May 16, 1881 – Jul 29, 1881	Vacant		
23	Warner Miller (Herkimer)	Republican	Jul 27, 1881 – Mar 3, 1887	Elected to finish Platt's term. Lost renomination.	17	47th	16	Elected to finish Conkling's term. Retired.	Jul 29, 1881 – Mar 3, 1885	Republican	Elbridge G. Lapham (Canandaigua)	16
23	Warner Miller (Herkimer)	Republican	Jul 27, 1881 – Mar 3, 1887	Elected to finish Platt's term. Lost renomination.	17	48th	16	Elected to finish Conkling's term. Retired.	Jul 29, 1881 – Mar 3, 1885	Republican	Elbridge G. Lapham (Canandaigua)	16
23	Warner Miller (Herkimer)	Republican	Jul 27, 1881 – Mar 3, 1887	Elected to finish Platt's term. Lost renomination.	17	49th	17	Elected in 1885. Lost re-election.	Mar 4, 1885 – Mar 3, 1891	Republican	William M. Evarts (New York)	17
24	Frank Hiscock (Syracuse)	Republican	Mar 4, 1887 – Mar 3, 1893	Elected in 1887. Lost re-election.	18	50th	17	Elected in 1885. Lost re-election.	Mar 4, 1885 – Mar 3, 1891	Republican	William M. Evarts (New York)	17
24	Frank Hiscock (Syracuse)	Republican	Mar 4, 1887 – Mar 3, 1893	Elected in 1887. Lost re-election.	18	51st	17	Elected in 1885. Lost re-election.	Mar 4, 1885 – Mar 3, 1891	Republican	William M. Evarts (New York)	17
24	Frank Hiscock (Syracuse)	Republican	Mar 4, 1887 – Mar 3, 1893	Elected in 1887. Lost re-election.	18	52nd	18	Vacant	Mar 4, 1891 – Jan 7, 1892	Vacant		
24	Frank Hiscock (Syracuse)	Republican	Mar 4, 1887 – Mar 3, 1893	Elected in 1887. Lost re-election.	18	52nd	18	Elected in 1891, but took his seat only after term as N.Y. Governor ended. Lost re-election.	Jan 7, 1892 – Mar 3, 1897	Democratic	David B. Hill (Albany)	18
25	Edward Murphy Jr. (Troy)	Democratic	Mar 4, 1893 – Mar 3, 1899	Elected in 1893. Lost re-election.	19	53rd	18	Elected in 1891, but took his seat only after term as N.Y. Governor ended. Lost re-election.	Jan 7, 1892 – Mar 3, 1897	Democratic	David B. Hill (Albany)	18
25	Edward Murphy Jr. (Troy)	Democratic	Mar 4, 1893 – Mar 3, 1899	Elected in 1893. Lost re-election.	19	54th	18	Elected in 1891, but took his seat only after term as N.Y. Governor ended. Lost re-election.	Jan 7, 1892 – Mar 3, 1897	Democratic	David B. Hill (Albany)	18
25	Edward Murphy Jr. (Troy)	Democratic	Mar 4, 1893 – Mar 3, 1899	Elected in 1893. Lost re-election.	19	55th	19	Elected Jan 20, 1897.	Mar 4, 1897 – Mar 3, 1909	Republican	Thomas C. Platt (Owego)	19
26	Chauncey Depew (Peekskill)	Republican	Mar 4, 1899 – Mar 3, 1911	Elected in 1899.	20	56th	19	Elected Jan 20, 1897.	Mar 4, 1897 – Mar 3, 1909	Republican	Thomas C. Platt (Owego)	19
26	Chauncey Depew (Peekskill)	Republican	Mar 4, 1899 – Mar 3, 1911	Elected in 1899.	20	57th	19	Elected Jan 20, 1897.	Mar 4, 1897 – Mar 3, 1909	Republican	Thomas C. Platt (Owego)	19
26	Chauncey Depew (Peekskill)	Republican	Mar 4, 1899 – Mar 3, 1911	Elected in 1899.	20	58th	20	Re-elected Jan 20, 1903. Retired.	Mar 4, 1897 – Mar 3, 1909	Republican	Thomas C. Platt (Owego)	19
26	Chauncey Depew (Peekskill)	Republican	Mar 4, 1899 – Mar 3, 1911	Re-elected in 1905. Lost re-election.	21	59th	20	Re-elected Jan 20, 1903. Retired.	Mar 4, 1897 – Mar 3, 1909	Republican	Thomas C. Platt (Owego)	19
26	Chauncey Depew (Peekskill)	Republican	Mar 4, 1899 – Mar 3, 1911	Re-elected in 1905. Lost re-election.	21	60th	20	Re-elected Jan 20, 1903. Retired.	Mar 4, 1897 – Mar 3, 1909	Republican	Thomas C. Platt (Owego)	19
26	Chauncey Depew (Peekskill)	Republican	Mar 4, 1899 – Mar 3, 1911	Re-elected in 1905. Lost re-election.	21	61st	21	Elected Jan 19, 1909. Retired.	Mar 4, 1909 – Mar 3, 1915	Republican	Elihu Root (New York)	20
Vacant			Mar 3, 1911 – Apr 4, 1911	Vacant	22	62nd	21	Elected Jan 19, 1909. Retired.	Mar 4, 1909 – Mar 3, 1915	Republican	Elihu Root (New York)	20
27	James A. O'Gorman (New York)	Democratic	Apr 4, 1911 – Mar 3, 1917	Elected Mar 31, 1911. Retired.	22	62nd	21	Elected Jan 19, 1909. Retired.	Mar 4, 1909 – Mar 3, 1915	Republican	Elihu Root (New York)	20
27	James A. O'Gorman (New York)	Democratic	Apr 4, 1911 – Mar 3, 1917	Elected Mar 31, 1911. Retired.	22	63rd	21	Elected Jan 19, 1909. Retired.	Mar 4, 1909 – Mar 3, 1915	Republican	Elihu Root (New York)	20
27	James A. O'Gorman (New York)	Democratic	Apr 4, 1911 – Mar 3, 1917	Elected Mar 31, 1911. Retired.	22	64th	22	Elected in 1914.	Mar 4, 1915 – Mar 3, 1927	Republican	James W. Wadsworth Jr. (Groveland)	21
28	William M. Calder (Brooklyn)	Republican	Mar 4, 1917 – Mar 3, 1923	Elected in 1916. Lost re-election.	23	65th	22	Elected in 1914.	Mar 4, 1915 – Mar 3, 1927	Republican	James W. Wadsworth Jr. (Groveland)	21
28	William M. Calder (Brooklyn)	Republican	Mar 4, 1917 – Mar 3, 1923	Elected in 1916. Lost re-election.	23	66th	22	Elected in 1914.	Mar 4, 1915 – Mar 3, 1927	Republican	James W. Wadsworth Jr. (Groveland)	21
28	William M. Calder (Brooklyn)	Republican	Mar 4, 1917 – Mar 3, 1923	Elected in 1916. Lost re-election.	23	67th	23	Re-elected in 1920. Lost re-election.	Mar 4, 1915 – Mar 3, 1927	Republican	James W. Wadsworth Jr. (Groveland)	21
29	Royal S. Copeland (New York)	Democratic	Mar 4, 1923 – Jun 17, 1938	Elected in 1922.	24	68th	23	Re-elected in 1920. Lost re-election.	Mar 4, 1915 – Mar 3, 1927	Republican	James W. Wadsworth Jr. (Groveland)	21
29	Royal S. Copeland (New York)	Democratic	Mar 4, 1923 – Jun 17, 1938	Elected in 1922.	24	69th	23	Re-elected in 1920. Lost re-election.	Mar 4, 1915 – Mar 3, 1927	Republican	James W. Wadsworth Jr. (Groveland)	21
29	Royal S. Copeland (New York)	Democratic	Mar 4, 1923 – Jun 17, 1938	Elected in 1922.	24	70th	24	Elected in 1926.	Mar 4, 1927 – Jun 28, 1949	Democratic	Robert F. Wagner (New York)	22
29	Royal S. Copeland (New York)	Democratic	Mar 4, 1923 – Jun 17, 1938	Re-elected in 1928.	25	71st	24	Elected in 1926.	Mar 4, 1927 – Jun 28, 1949	Democratic	Robert F. Wagner (New York)	22
29	Royal S. Copeland (New York)	Democratic	Mar 4, 1923 – Jun 17, 1938	Re-elected in 1928.	25	72nd	24	Elected in 1926.	Mar 4, 1927 – Jun 28, 1949	Democratic	Robert F. Wagner (New York)	22
29	Royal S. Copeland (New York)	Democratic	Mar 4, 1923 – Jun 17, 1938	Re-elected in 1928.	25	73rd	25	Re-elected in 1932.	Mar 4, 1927 – Jun 28, 1949	Democratic	Robert F. Wagner (New York)	22
29	Royal S. Copeland (New York)	Democratic	Mar 4, 1923 – Jun 17, 1938	Re-elected in 1934. Died.	26	74th	25	Re-elected in 1932.	Mar 4, 1927 – Jun 28, 1949	Democratic	Robert F. Wagner (New York)	22
29	Royal S. Copeland (New York)	Democratic	Mar 4, 1923 – Jun 17, 1938	Re-elected in 1934. Died.	26	75th	25	Re-elected in 1932.	Mar 4, 1927 – Jun 28, 1949	Democratic	Robert F. Wagner (New York)	22
Vacant			Jun 17, 1938 – Dec 3, 1938	Vacant	26	75th	25	Re-elected in 1932.	Mar 4, 1927 – Jun 28, 1949	Democratic	Robert F. Wagner (New York)	22
30	James M. Mead (Buffalo)	Democratic	Dec 3, 1938 – Jan 3, 1947	Elected to finish Copeland's term.	26	75th	25	Re-elected in 1932.	Mar 4, 1927 – Jun 28, 1949	Democratic	Robert F. Wagner (New York)	22
30	James M. Mead (Buffalo)	Democratic	Dec 3, 1938 – Jan 3, 1947	Elected to finish Copeland's term.	26	76th	26	Re-elected in 1938.	Mar 4, 1927 – Jun 28, 1949	Democratic	Robert F. Wagner (New York)	22
30	James M. Mead (Buffalo)	Democratic	Dec 3, 1938 – Jan 3, 1947	Re-elected in 1940. Retired to run for N.Y. Governor.	27	77th	26	Re-elected in 1938.	Mar 4, 1927 – Jun 28, 1949	Democratic	Robert F. Wagner (New York)	22
30	James M. Mead (Buffalo)	Democratic	Dec 3, 1938 – Jan 3, 1947	Re-elected in 1940. Retired to run for N.Y. Governor.	27	78th	26	Re-elected in 1938.	Mar 4, 1927 – Jun 28, 1949	Democratic	Robert F. Wagner (New York)	22
30	James M. Mead (Buffalo)	Democratic	Dec 3, 1938 – Jan 3, 1947	Re-elected in 1940. Retired to run for N.Y. Governor.	27	79th	27	Re-elected in 1944. Resigned due to ill health.	Mar 4, 1927 – Jun 28, 1949	Democratic	Robert F. Wagner (New York)	22
31	Irving Ives (Norwich)	Republican	Jan 3, 1947 – Jan 3, 1959	Elected in 1946.	28	80th	27	Re-elected in 1944. Resigned due to ill health.	Mar 4, 1927 – Jun 28, 1949	Democratic	Robert F. Wagner (New York)	22
31	Irving Ives (Norwich)	Republican	Jan 3, 1947 – Jan 3, 1959	Elected in 1946.	28	81st	27	Re-elected in 1944. Resigned due to ill health.	Mar 4, 1927 – Jun 28, 1949	Democratic	Robert F. Wagner (New York)	22
31	Irving Ives (Norwich)	Republican	Jan 3, 1947 – Jan 3, 1959	Elected in 1946.	28	81st	27	Vacant	Jun 28, 1949 – Jul 7, 1949	Vacant		
31	Irving Ives (Norwich)	Republican	Jan 3, 1947 – Jan 3, 1959	Elected in 1946.	28	81st	27	Appointed to continue Wagner's term. Lost election to finish Wagner's term.	Jul 7, 1949 – Nov 8, 1949	Republican	John Foster Dulles (New York)	23
31	Irving Ives (Norwich)	Republican	Jan 3, 1947 – Jan 3, 1959	Elected in 1946.	28	81st	27	Elected to finish Wagner's term.	Nov 9, 1949 – Jan 3, 1957	Democratic	Herbert H. Lehman (New York)	24
31	Irving Ives (Norwich)	Republican	Jan 3, 1947 – Jan 3, 1959	Elected in 1946.	28	82nd	28	Re-elected in 1950. Retired.	Nov 9, 1949 – Jan 3, 1957	Democratic	Herbert H. Lehman (New York)	24
31	Irving Ives (Norwich)	Republican	Jan 3, 1947 – Jan 3, 1959	Re-elected in 1952. Retired.	29	83rd	28	Re-elected in 1950. Retired.	Nov 9, 1949 – Jan 3, 1957	Democratic	Herbert H. Lehman (New York)	24
31	Irving Ives (Norwich)	Republican	Jan 3, 1947 – Jan 3, 1959	Re-elected in 1952. Retired.	29	84th	28	Re-elected in 1950. Retired.	Nov 9, 1949 – Jan 3, 1957	Democratic	Herbert H. Lehman (New York)	24
31	Irving Ives (Norwich)	Republican	Jan 3, 1947 – Jan 3, 1959	Re-elected in 1952. Retired.	29	85th	29	Vacant	Jan 3, 1957 – Jan 9, 1957	Vacant		
31	Irving Ives (Norwich)	Republican	Jan 3, 1947 – Jan 3, 1959	Re-elected in 1952. Retired.	29	85th	29	Elected in 1956. Seated late to complete his term as Attorney General of New York.	Jan 9, 1957 – Jan 3, 1981	Republican	Jacob Javits (New York)	25
32	Kenneth Keating (Rochester)	Republican	Jan 3, 1959 – Jan 3, 1965	Elected in 1958. Lost re-election.	30	86th	29	Elected in 1956. Seated late to complete his term as Attorney General of New York.	Jan 9, 1957 – Jan 3, 1981	Republican	Jacob Javits (New York)	25
32	Kenneth Keating (Rochester)	Republican	Jan 3, 1959 – Jan 3, 1965	Elected in 1958. Lost re-election.	30	87th	29	Elected in 1956. Seated late to complete his term as Attorney General of New York.	Jan 9, 1957 – Jan 3, 1981	Republican	Jacob Javits (New York)	25
32	Kenneth Keating (Rochester)	Republican	Jan 3, 1959 – Jan 3, 1965	Elected in 1958. Lost re-election.	30	88th	30	Re-elected in 1962.	Jan 9, 1957 – Jan 3, 1981	Republican	Jacob Javits (New York)	25
33	Robert F. Kennedy (New York)	Democratic	Jan 3, 1965 – Jun 6, 1968	Elected in 1964. Assassinated.	31	89th	30	Re-elected in 1962.	Jan 9, 1957 – Jan 3, 1981	Republican	Jacob Javits (New York)	25
33	Robert F. Kennedy (New York)	Democratic	Jan 3, 1965 – Jun 6, 1968	Elected in 1964. Assassinated.	31	90th	30	Re-elected in 1962.	Jan 9, 1957 – Jan 3, 1981	Republican	Jacob Javits (New York)	25
Vacant			Jun 6, 1968 – Sep 10, 1968	Vacant	31	90th	30	Re-elected in 1962.	Jan 9, 1957 – Jan 3, 1981	Republican	Jacob Javits (New York)	25
34	Charles Goodell (Jamestown)	Republican	Sep 10, 1968 – Jan 3, 1971	Appointed to finish Kennedy's term. Lost election to a full term.	31	90th	30	Re-elected in 1962.	Jan 9, 1957 – Jan 3, 1981	Republican	Jacob Javits (New York)	25
34	Charles Goodell (Jamestown)	Republican	Sep 10, 1968 – Jan 3, 1971	Appointed to finish Kennedy's term. Lost election to a full term.	31	91st	31	Re-elected in 1968.	Jan 9, 1957 – Jan 3, 1981	Republican	Jacob Javits (New York)	25
35	James L. Buckley (New York)	Conservative	Jan 3, 1971 – Jan 3, 1977	Elected in 1970. Changed parties in 1976. Lost re-election.	32	92nd	31	Re-elected in 1968.	Jan 9, 1957 – Jan 3, 1981	Republican	Jacob Javits (New York)	25
35	James L. Buckley (New York)	Conservative	Jan 3, 1971 – Jan 3, 1977	Elected in 1970. Changed parties in 1976. Lost re-election.	32	93rd	31	Re-elected in 1968.	Jan 9, 1957 – Jan 3, 1981	Republican	Jacob Javits (New York)	25
35	James L. Buckley (New York)	Conservative	Jan 3, 1971 – Jan 3, 1977	Elected in 1970. Changed parties in 1976. Lost re-election.	32	94th	32	Re-elected in 1974. Lost renomination and then lost re-election as a Liberal.	Jan 9, 1957 – Jan 3, 1981	Republican	Jacob Javits (New York)	25
35	James L. Buckley (New York)	Republican	Jan 3, 1971 – Jan 3, 1977	Elected in 1970. Changed parties in 1976. Lost re-election.	32	94th	32	Re-elected in 1974. Lost renomination and then lost re-election as a Liberal.	Jan 9, 1957 – Jan 3, 1981	Republican	Jacob Javits (New York)	25
36	Daniel Patrick Moynihan (Oneonta)	Democratic	Jan 3, 1977 – Jan 3, 2001	Elected in 1976.	33	95th	32	Re-elected in 1974. Lost renomination and then lost re-election as a Liberal.	Jan 9, 1957 – Jan 3, 1981	Republican	Jacob Javits (New York)	25
36	Daniel Patrick Moynihan (Oneonta)	Democratic	Jan 3, 1977 – Jan 3, 2001	Elected in 1976.	33	96th	32	Re-elected in 1974. Lost renomination and then lost re-election as a Liberal.	Jan 9, 1957 – Jan 3, 1981	Republican	Jacob Javits (New York)	25
36	Daniel Patrick Moynihan (Oneonta)	Democratic	Jan 3, 1977 – Jan 3, 2001	Elected in 1976.	33	97th	33	Elected in 1980.	Jan 3, 1981 – Jan 3, 1999	Republican	Al D'Amato (Island Park)	26
36	Daniel Patrick Moynihan (Oneonta)	Democratic	Jan 3, 1977 – Jan 3, 2001	Re-elected in 1982.	34	98th	33	Elected in 1980.	Jan 3, 1981 – Jan 3, 1999	Republican	Al D'Amato (Island Park)	26
36	Daniel Patrick Moynihan (Oneonta)	Democratic	Jan 3, 1977 – Jan 3, 2001	Re-elected in 1982.	34	99th	33	Elected in 1980.	Jan 3, 1981 – Jan 3, 1999	Republican	Al D'Amato (Island Park)	26
36	Daniel Patrick Moynihan (Oneonta)	Democratic	Jan 3, 1977 – Jan 3, 2001	Re-elected in 1982.	34	100th	34	Re-elected in 1986.	Jan 3, 1981 – Jan 3, 1999	Republican	Al D'Amato (Island Park)	26
36	Daniel Patrick Moynihan (Oneonta)	Democratic	Jan 3, 1977 – Jan 3, 2001	Re-elected in 1988.	35	101st	34	Re-elected in 1986.	Jan 3, 1981 – Jan 3, 1999	Republican	Al D'Amato (Island Park)	26
36	Daniel Patrick Moynihan (Oneonta)	Democratic	Jan 3, 1977 – Jan 3, 2001	Re-elected in 1988.	35	102nd	34	Re-elected in 1986.	Jan 3, 1981 – Jan 3, 1999	Republican	Al D'Amato (Island Park)	26
36	Daniel Patrick Moynihan (Oneonta)	Democratic	Jan 3, 1977 – Jan 3, 2001	Re-elected in 1988.	35	103rd	35	Re-elected in 1992. Lost re-election.	Jan 3, 1981 – Jan 3, 1999	Republican	Al D'Amato (Island Park)	26
36	Daniel Patrick Moynihan (Oneonta)	Democratic	Jan 3, 1977 – Jan 3, 2001	Re-elected in 1994. Retired.	36	104th	35	Re-elected in 1992. Lost re-election.	Jan 3, 1981 – Jan 3, 1999	Republican	Al D'Amato (Island Park)	26
36	Daniel Patrick Moynihan (Oneonta)	Democratic	Jan 3, 1977 – Jan 3, 2001	Re-elected in 1994. Retired.	36	105th	35	Re-elected in 1992. Lost re-election.	Jan 3, 1981 – Jan 3, 1999	Republican	Al D'Amato (Island Park)	26
36	Daniel Patrick Moynihan (Oneonta)	Democratic	Jan 3, 1977 – Jan 3, 2001	Re-elected in 1994. Retired.	36	106th	36	Elected in 1998.	Jan 3, 1999 – present	Democratic	Chuck Schumer (Brooklyn)	27
37	Hillary Clinton (Chappaqua)	Democratic	Jan 3, 2001 – Jan 21, 2009	Elected in 2000.	37	107th	36	Elected in 1998.	Jan 3, 1999 – present	Democratic	Chuck Schumer (Brooklyn)	27
37	Hillary Clinton (Chappaqua)	Democratic	Jan 3, 2001 – Jan 21, 2009	Elected in 2000.	37	108th	36	Elected in 1998.	Jan 3, 1999 – present	Democratic	Chuck Schumer (Brooklyn)	27
37	Hillary Clinton (Chappaqua)	Democratic	Jan 3, 2001 – Jan 21, 2009	Elected in 2000.	37	109th	37	Re-elected in 2004.	Jan 3, 1999 – present	Democratic	Chuck Schumer (Brooklyn)	27
37	Hillary Clinton (Chappaqua)	Democratic	Jan 3, 2001 – Jan 21, 2009	Re-elected in 2006. Resigned to become U.S. Secretary of State.	38	110th	37	Re-elected in 2004.	Jan 3, 1999 – present	Democratic	Chuck Schumer (Brooklyn)	27
37	Hillary Clinton (Chappaqua)	Democratic	Jan 3, 2001 – Jan 21, 2009	Re-elected in 2006. Resigned to become U.S. Secretary of State.	38	111th	37	Re-elected in 2004.	Jan 3, 1999 – present	Democratic	Chuck Schumer (Brooklyn)	27
Vacant			Jan 21, 2009 – Jan 26, 2009	Vacant	38	111th	37	Re-elected in 2004.	Jan 3, 1999 – present	Democratic	Chuck Schumer (Brooklyn)	27
38	Kirsten Gillibrand (Albany)	Democratic	Jan 26, 2009 – present	Appointed to continue Clinton's term. Elected in 2010 to finish Clinton's term.	38	111th	37	Re-elected in 2004.	Jan 3, 1999 – present	Democratic	Chuck Schumer (Brooklyn)	27
38	Kirsten Gillibrand (Albany)	Democratic	Jan 26, 2009 – present	Appointed to continue Clinton's term. Elected in 2010 to finish Clinton's term.	38	112th	38	Re-elected in 2010.	Jan 3, 1999 – present	Democratic	Chuck Schumer (Brooklyn)	27
38	Kirsten Gillibrand (Albany)	Democratic	Jan 26, 2009 – present	Re-elected in 2012.	39	113th	38	Re-elected in 2010.	Jan 3, 1999 – present	Democratic	Chuck Schumer (Brooklyn)	27
38	Kirsten Gillibrand (Albany)	Democratic	Jan 26, 2009 – present	Re-elected in 2012.	39	114th	38	Re-elected in 2010.	Jan 3, 1999 – present	Democratic	Chuck Schumer (Brooklyn)	27
38	Kirsten Gillibrand (Albany)	Democratic	Jan 26, 2009 – present	Re-elected in 2012.	39	115th	39	Re-elected in 2016.	Jan 3, 1999 – present	Democratic	Chuck Schumer (Brooklyn)	27
38	Kirsten Gillibrand (Albany)	Democratic	Jan 26, 2009 – present	Re-elected in 2018.	40	116th	39	Re-elected in 2016.	Jan 3, 1999 – present	Democratic	Chuck Schumer (Brooklyn)	27
38	Kirsten Gillibrand (Albany)	Democratic	Jan 26, 2009 – present	Re-elected in 2018.	40	117th	39	Re-elected in 2016.	Jan 3, 1999 – present	Democratic	Chuck Schumer (Brooklyn)	27
38	Kirsten Gillibrand (Albany)	Democratic	Jan 26, 2009 – present	Re-elected in 2018.	40	118th	40	Re-elected in 2022.	Jan 3, 1999 – present	Democratic	Chuck Schumer (Brooklyn)	27
38	Kirsten Gillibrand (Albany)	Democratic	Jan 26, 2009 – present	Re-elected in 2024.	41	119th	40	Re-elected in 2022.	Jan 3, 1999 – present	Democratic	Chuck Schumer (Brooklyn)	27
38	Kirsten Gillibrand (Albany)	Democratic	Jan 26, 2009 – present	Re-elected in 2024.	41	120th	40	Re-elected in 2022.	Jan 3, 1999 – present	Democratic	Chuck Schumer (Brooklyn)	27
38	Kirsten Gillibrand (Albany)	Democratic	Jan 26, 2009 – present	Re-elected in 2024.	41	121st	41	To be determined in the 2028 election.				
To be determined in the 2030 election.					42	122nd	41	To be determined in the 2028 election.				

== See also ==
- Elections in New York
- List of United States representatives from New York
- New York's congressional delegations
