= 1797 United States Senate election in New York =

- January 24, 1797

Majority approval in both houses needed to win
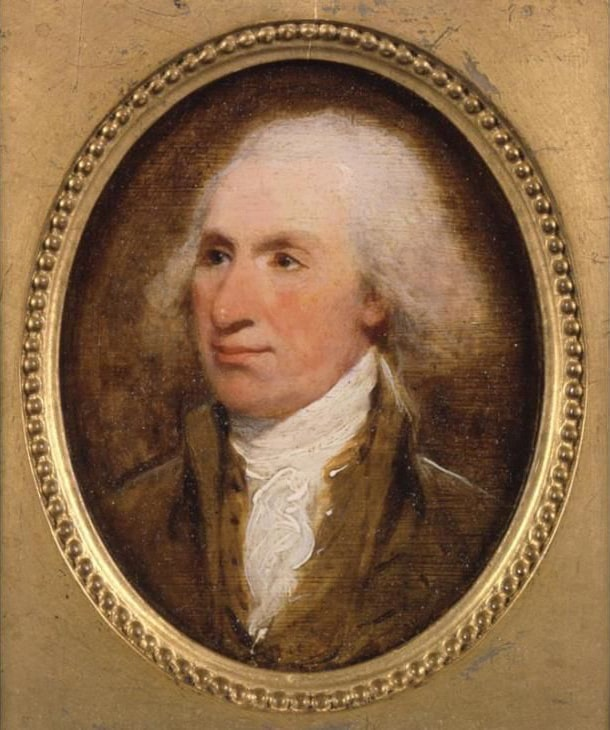
| Candidate | Philip Schuyler |
| Party | Federalist |
| Senate | Unanimous |
| House | 85 |
| House % | 98.8% |
U.S. senator before election
Aaron Burr
Democratic-Republican
Elected U.S. Senator
Philip Schuyler
Federalist

The 1797 United States Senate election in New York was held on January 24, 1797, by the New York State Legislature to elect a U.S. senator (Class 1) to represent the State of New York in the United States Senate. Incumbent Senator Aaron Burr's name was not placed into nomination for a second term. Former Senator Philip Schuyler was elected.

== Background ==
Democratic-Republican Aaron Burr had been elected in 1791 after the Assembly rejected incumbent Philip Schuyler.

At the State election in April 1796, Federalist majorities were elected to both houses of the 20th New York State Legislature which met from November 1 to 11, 1796, at New York City, and from January 3 to April 3, 1797, at Albany, New York.

== Candidates ==
Ex-U.S. Senator (in office 1789–1791) Philip Schuyler, now a State Senator, ran again as the candidate of the Federalist Party.

== Result ==
Schuyler was the choice of both the State Senate and the State Assembly, and was declared elected.

1797 United States Senate election result
| House | Philip Schuyler | James Kent |
|---|---|---|
| State Senate | Unanimous | |
| State Assembly | 85 | 1 |

== Aftermath ==
Schuyler resigned on January 3, 1798, because of ill health, and a special election to fill the vacancy was held on January 11, 1798.

== Sources ==
- The New York Civil List compiled in 1858 (see: pg. 62 for U.S. Senators; pg. 116 for State Senators 1796–97; page 170f for Members of Assembly 1796–97) [gives election date as "January 24"]
- Members of the Fifth United States Congress
- History of Political Parties in the State of New-York by Jabez Delano Hammond (pages 105f) [gives election date as "31st of March" which is not likely, Burrs term having expired on March 4 and there being no controversy about the election]
- Life of General Philip Schuyler, 1733-1804 by Bayard Tuckerman (page 258) [says: Schuyler was elected "almost unanimously."]
