= 1848 New York state election =

- November 7, 1848

The 1848 New York state election took place on November 7, 1848, to elect the governor, the lieutenant governor, a Canal Commissioner and an Inspector of State Prisons, as well as all members of the New York State Assembly.

== History ==
The Hunker state convention met on September 5 in Syracuse. Walworth and O'Conor were nominated on the first ballot. The vote for governor was 98 for Walworth, 23 for Zadock Pratt, and 3 for Greene C. Bronson. The vote for lieutenant governor was 83 for O'Conor, 16 for Clinton, 6 for Nathan Dayton, 5 for Baldwin and 3 scattering.

The Whig state convention met on September 13 in Utica. Fish was nominated for governor on the first ballot with 76 votes for him, 28 votes for Joshua A. Spencer, and only 20 votes for the incumbent John Young.

The Barnburner Free Soil state convention was held on September 13 and 14 at the Court House in Utica. Dix and Gates were nominated by acclamation. The Liberty state convention also met on the same day in the same city, and after passing resolutions, the delegates walked to the Court House and sat with the Free Soil convention as honorary members.

== Result ==
Due to the split of the Democratic Party, the whole Whig state ticket was elected.

106 Whigs, 15 Free Soilers and 7 Hunkers were elected to the New York State Assembly of the 72nd New York State Legislature.

1848 state election results
Office	Whig ticket		Dem.-Barnburner/Free Soil ticket		Dem.-Hunker ticket		Liberty ticket	
Governor	Hamilton Fish	218,776	John Adams Dix	122,889	Reuben H. Walworth	116,811	William Goodell	1,593
Lieutenant Governor	George Washington Patterson	222,970	Seth Merrill Gates	113,667	Charles O'Conor	116,907	Robert Anderson	1,520
Canal Commissioner	Charles Cook		Charles Augustus Wheaton		Charles Sherman McLean			
Inspector of State Prisons	Alexander H. Wells		William P. Angel					

== See also ==
- New York gubernatorial elections
- New York state elections

== Sources ==
- Result for Gov. and Lt. Gov. in Manual of the Corporation of the City of New York (1852; page 367)
