= Northern Democratic Party =

Northern faction of the Democratic Party during the 1860 presidential election

- Historical leaders: (War Democrats): John Adams Dix; George Bancroft; John Brough; (Copperheads): Clement Vallandigham; Alexander Long
- Founded: 1860
- Dissolved: 1868
- Faction: War Democrats
- Faction: Copperheads
- National affiliation: Democratic Party

The Northern Democratic Party was a leg of the Democratic Party during the 1860 presidential election, when the party split in two factions because of disagreements over slavery. The Democratic Party held three conventions before the election, one in Charleston and two in Baltimore. Senator Stephen A. Douglas was nominated by the Northern wing of the party and Vice President John C. Breckinridge was nominated by the Southern wing of the party. Both candidates lost to Republican nominee Abraham Lincoln, who presided over the American Civil War. The Northern Democratic Party can also refer to other Civil War-era factions of the party.

== History ==
Sectional confrontations escalated during the 1850s, the Democratic Party split between North and South grew deeper. The conflict was papered over at the 1852 and 1856 conventions by selecting men who had little involvement in sectionalism, but they made matters worse. Historian Roy F. Nichols explains why Franklin Pierce was not up to the challenges a Democratic president had to face:

As a national political leader Pierce was an accident. He was honest and tenacious of his views but, as he made up his mind with difficulty and often reversed himself before making a final decision, he gave a general impression of instability. Kind, courteous, generous, he attracted many individuals, but his attempts to satisfy all factions failed and made him many enemies. In carrying out his principles of strict construction he was most in accord with Southerners, who generally had the letter of the law on their side. He failed utterly to realize the depth and the sincerity of Northern feeling against the South and was bewildered at the general flouting of the law and the Constitution, as he described it, by the people of his own New England. At no time did he catch the popular imagination. His inability to cope with the difficult problems that arose early in his administration caused him to lose the respect of great numbers, especially in the North, and his few successes failed to restore public confidence. He was an inexperienced man, suddenly called to assume a tremendous responsibility, who honestly tried to do his best without adequate training or temperamental fitness.

In 1854, Stephen A. Douglas of Illinois—a key Democratic leader in the Senate—pushed the Kansas–Nebraska Act through Congress. President Franklin Pierce signed the bill into law in 1854. The Act opened Kansas Territory and Nebraska Territory to a decision by the residences on whether slavery would be legal or not. Previously it had been illegal there. Thus the new law implicitly repealed the prohibition on slavery in territory north of 36° 30′ latitude that had been part of the Missouri Compromise of 1820. Supporters and enemies of slavery poured into Kansas to vote slavery up or down. The armed conflict was Bleeding Kansas and it shook the nation. A major re-alignment took place among voters and politicians. The Whig Party fell apart and the new Republican Party was founded in opposition to the expansion of slavery and to the Kansas–Nebraska Act. The new party had little support in the South, but it soon became a majority in the North by pulling together former Whigs and former Free Soil Democrats.

During the Civil War, Northern Democrats divided into two factions: the War Democrats, who supported the military policies of President Lincoln; and the Copperheads, who strongly opposed them. No party politics were allowed in the Confederacy, whose political leadership, mindful of the welter prevalent in antebellum American politics and with a pressing need for unity, largely viewed political parties as inimical to good governance and as being especially unwise in wartime. Consequently, the Democratic Party halted all operations during the life of the Confederacy (1861–1865).

Partisanship flourished in the North and strengthened the Lincoln Administration as Republicans automatically rallied behind it. After the attack on Fort Sumter, Douglas rallied Northern Democrats behind the Union, but when Douglas died the party lacked an outstanding figure in the North and by 1862 an anti-war peace element was gaining strength. The most intense anti-war elements were the Copperheads. The Democratic Party did well in the 1862 congressional elections, but in 1864 it nominated General George McClellan (a War Democrat) on a peace platform and lost badly because many War Democrats bolted to National Union candidate Abraham Lincoln. Many former Democrats became Republicans, especially soldiers such as generals Ulysses S. Grant and John A. Logan.

== Party platform ==
The Northern Democratic Party declared their support for the policies laid out at the 1856 Democratic convention in Cincinnati. They resolved not to change any of the policies but suggested the additions of resolutions in relation to the nature and extent of the powers of a Territorial Legislature, as well as the powers of Congress over slavery.

- They resolved that the party will obey the decisions of the supreme court on the questions of constitutional law.
- That the United States has a duty to provide protection to all citizens, at home and abroad, whether they are native or foreign.
- That the Democratic party will insure the construction of a railroad to the Pacific coast as soon as possible, to facilitate fast communication between Atlantic and Pacific states,
- That they support the acquisition of Cuba, as long as the terms are agreeably to the United States and Spain.
- That the attempts to defeat the execution of the Fugitive Slave Law, are hostile, undermine the Constitution, and revolutionary in their effect.
- That while Territorial Governments are in existence, the measure of restriction imposed by the Federal Constitution on the power of the Territorial Legislature over the subject of the domestic relations shall be respected and enforced by every branch of the General Government.

== Copperheads ==
In the 1860s, the Copperheads, also known as Peace Democrats, were a faction of Democrats in the Union who opposed the American Civil War and wanted an immediate peace settlement with the Confederates.

== War Democrats ==
War Democrats in American politics of the 1860s were members of the Democratic Party who supported the Union and rejected the policies of the Copperheads (or Peace Democrats). The War Democrats demanded a more aggressive policy toward the Confederacy and supported the policies of Republican President Abraham Lincoln, when the American Civil War broke out a few months after his victory in the 1860 presidential election.
