= Barnburners and Hunkers =

New York political rivalry

The Barnburners and Hunkers were two opposing factions of the New York Democratic Party in the 1840s and early 1850s. The main issue dividing the two factions was that of slavery, with the Barnburners being the anti-slavery faction. While this division occurred within the context of New York politics, it reflected the national divisions in the Democratic Party in the years preceding the American Civil War.

== Barnburners ==
Barnburner Democrats
- Founded: 1840s
- Dissolved: Early 1850s
- Preceded by: Locofocos
- Succeeded by: Free Soil Party; Northern Democratic Party; Opposition Party
- Ideology: Abolitionism; Radicalism; Reformism; Anti-corruption; Laissez-faire
- Political position: Left-wing
- National affiliation: Democratic Party

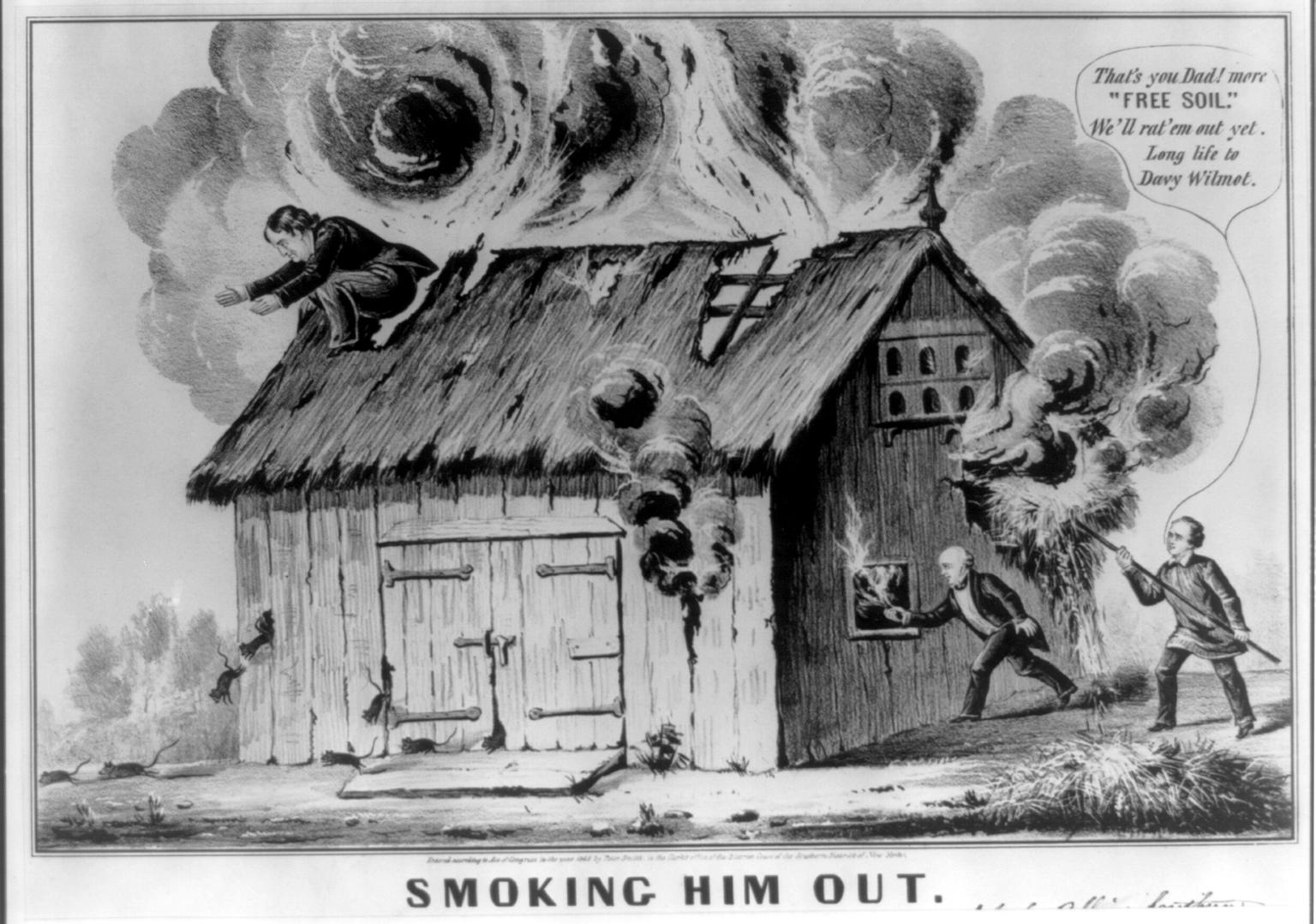
1848 cartoon satirizing the Barnburners / Free Soil Party, referencing the Wilmot Proviso

The term barnburner was derived from a folktale about a Dutch farmer who burned down his own barn in order to get rid of a rat infestation. In this case it was applied to men who were thought to be willing to destroy all banks and corporations in order to root out their abuses.

The origins of the Barnburners can be traced to the national crisis over the annexation of Texas in 1844, causing a schism between the northern and southern wings of the Democratic Party. Anti-annexation northern Democrats blamed pro-slavery supporters of John C. Calhoun for denying Martin Van Buren the presidential nomination and ushering in pro-Texas candidate James K. Polk. The South's bid to introduce a slavery controversy into the political landscape engendered bitter resentments among Van Burenites who had long sought to contain sectional conflicts.

When Texas annexation provoked war with Mexico, disaffected Van Burenites sought to ban slavery in Mexican lands obtained by the Polk administration. These "Barnburner Democrats" based free soil ideology largely on the grounds that slave labor threatened to displace and degrade free white labor. Van Burenite "antislavery" was little concerned with the suffering of enslaved blacks, emphasizing instead the benefits to white small entrepreneurial farmers and independent artisans. Anti-slavery Barnburner radicals argued for a complete disengagement of the federal government from slave-holding interests.

"Gentlemen, they call us Barnburners. Thunder and lightning are barnburners sometimes; but they greatly purify the atmosphere, and that, gentlemen, is what we propose."—Colonel Samuel Young, early leader of the Barnburners, embracing the Hunker's derisive epithet.

At the 1848 presidential election, the Barnburners left the Democratic Party, refusing to support presidential nominee Lewis Cass. They joined with other anti-slavery groups, predominantly the abolitionist Liberty Party and some anti-slavery Conscience Whigs from New England and the Midwest, to form the Free Soil Party. Free-Soilers nominated former President Van Buren to run again for the presidency.

The party garnered 10% of the popular vote but failed to secure electoral college delegates in any contest. In the states of Massachusetts, Vermont, and New York the party won over 25% of the popular vote. This limited showing may be attributed to the fact that all northern parties had free-soil planks in their platforms in 1848. Free-Soilers had nonetheless contributed to the defeat of the doughface Cass.

After the Compromise of 1850 temporarily neutralized the issue of slavery and undercut the party's no-compromise position on the expansion of slave soil, and most Barnburners who had joined the Free Soil Party returned to the Democratic Party.

In 1854, some Barnburners helped to form the Republican Party in the fallout from the Kansas–Nebraska Act. More than 100,000 Democrats, most of whom were Barnburners, voted for Republican presidential nominee John Charles Fremont in 1856.

Dozens of leading Barnburners joined the Republican Party in the 1850s, among them former Congressmen Preston King, David Wilmot, Timothy Jenkins, George Rathbun and Martin Grover. James M. Doolittle, drafted the Wilmot Proviso plank for the 1847 state Democratic convention, and David Dudley Field presented it. Prominent editors from the Evening Post were Barnburners: William Cullen Bryant, John Bigelow and Parke Godwin. James S. Wadsworth, George Opdyke, Abijah Mann, James Nye and Reuben Fenton had served as operatives for the movement.

=== Other notable Barnburners ===
- John Adams Dix, U.S. Senator (1845–49)
- Martin Van Buren, 8th President of the United States (1837–41)
- Walt Whitman, journalist and poet. His publisher, a Hunker, fired Whitman for his Barnburner editorials as editor of the Brooklyn Daily Eagle.
- Silas Wright, Governor of New York (1846–47) and U.S. Senator (1833–44)

== Hunkers ==
Hunker Democrats
- Founded: 1840s
- Dissolved: Early 1850s
- Preceded by: Monopoly Democrats
- Succeeded by: Northern Democratic Party
- Ideology: Pro-Compromise; Traditionalist conservatism American System; Machine politics Factions: Popular sovereignty Pro-slavery
- Political position: Center to Right-wing
- National affiliation: Democratic Party

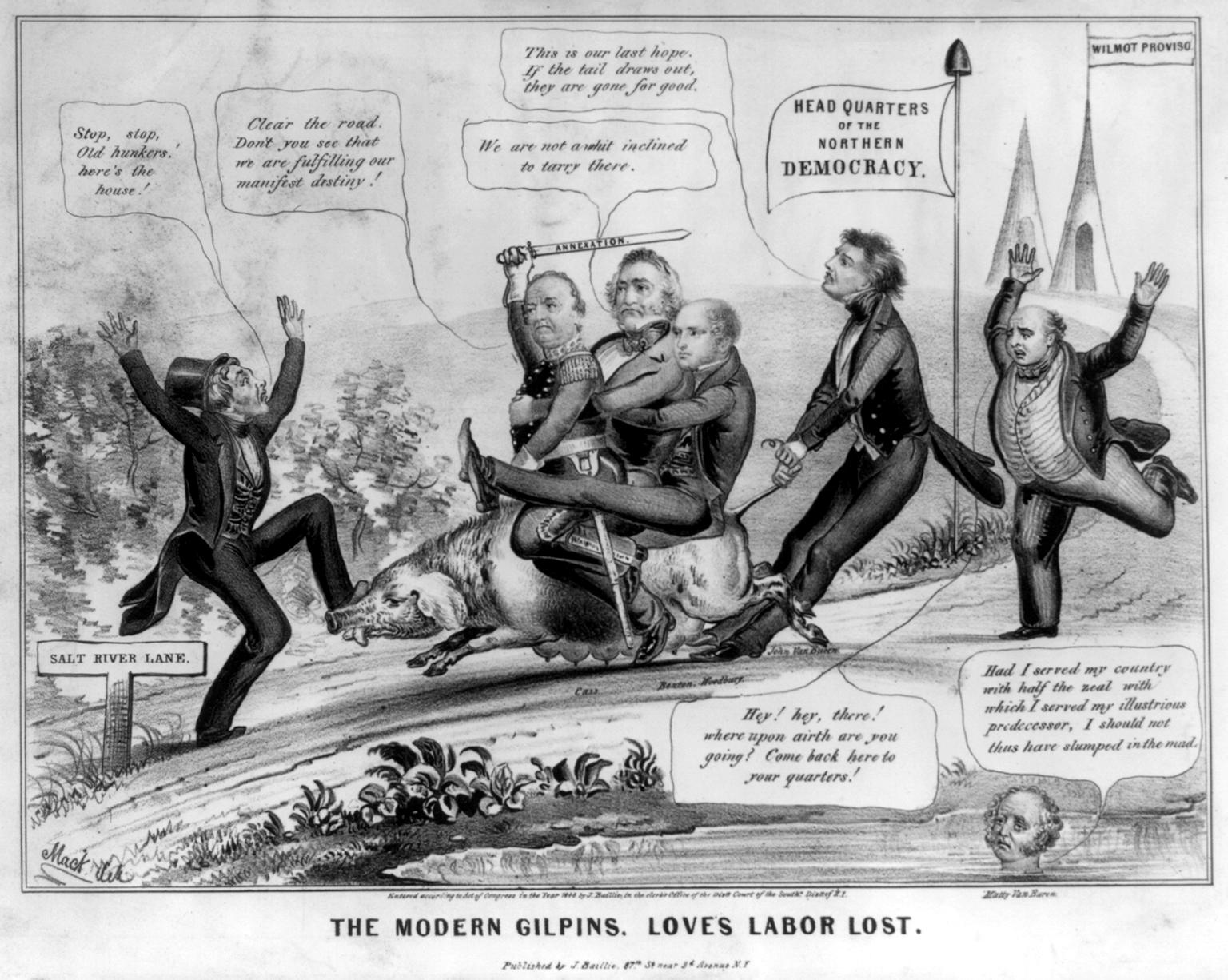
"The Modern Gilpins"—rivalry between the Hunkers and anti-slavery Democrats

The Hunkers were the relatively pro-government faction. They opposed the Barnburners, and typically favored state banks, state-funded internal improvements, and minimizing the slavery issue. A defining characteristic of the Hunkers was their willingness to compromise on the issue of slavery to maintain political unity and the continuation of the Democratic Party. They generally opposed the anti-slavery agitation of the Barnburners. They represented a more traditional element within the Democratic Party, tracing their roots back to Martin Van Buren's political machine.

=== Notable Hunkers ===
- Samuel Beardsley, U.S. Representative from Utica and New York Supreme Court justice
- Edwin Croswell, publisher of the Albany Argus
- Daniel S. Dickinson, U.S. Senator (1844–51)
- William L. Marcy, U.S. Secretary of State (1853–57), U.S. Secretary of War (1845–49), Governor of New York (1833–38) and U.S. Senator (1831–33)
- Horatio Seymour, Governor of New York (1853–54 and 1863–64) and Democratic nominee for President in 1868

=== Hards and Softs ===
Following the 1848 election, the Hunkers themselves split over the question of reconciliation with the Barnburners, with the Softs, led by Marcy, favoring reconciliation, and the Hards, led by Dickinson, opposing it. Disputes over party patronage would exacerbate this split following the Democratic victory in the 1852 presidential election, driving the narrow defeat of the incumbent Soft governor, Horatio Seymour, in 1854. The damaging party split would persist through the outbreak of the Civil War.

== Sources ==
- Foner, Eric. 1970. Free Soil, Free Labor, Free Men: The Ideology of the Republican Party Before the Civil War. Oxford University Press, New York. ISBN 0-19-501352-2 (paperback).
- Meridith, Mamie. 1930. "Hards" and "Softs" in American Politics American Speech, Vol. 5, No. 5 (Jun., 1930), pp. 408-413. Duke University Press.https://www.jstor.org/stable/452821 Accessed 15 May, 2026.
- Tameez, Zaakir. 2025. Charles Sumner: Conscience of a Nation. Henry Holt and Company, New York. ISBN 978-1-250-36255-1
