= John Adams Dix =

Union Army General and politician (1798–1879)

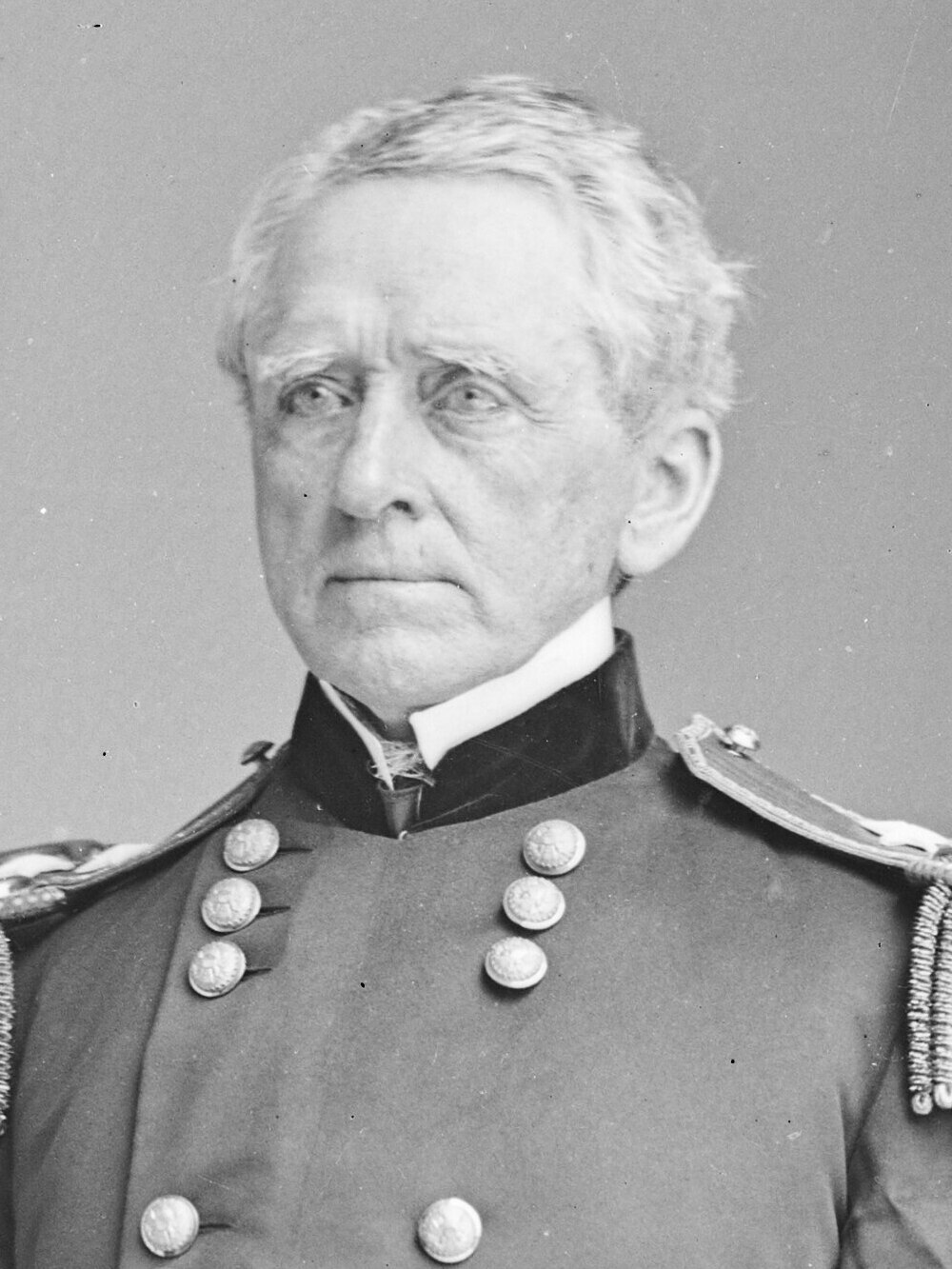
- Portrait by Brady, 1861

24th Governor of New York
- In office January 1, 1873 – December 31, 1874
- Lieutenant: John C. Robinson
- Preceded by: John T. Hoffman
- Succeeded by: Samuel J. Tilden

22nd United States Minister to France
- In office December 23, 1866 – May 23, 1869
- President: Andrew Johnson; Ulysses S. Grant
- Preceded by: John Bigelow
- Succeeded by: Elihu B. Washburne

24th United States Secretary of the Treasury
- In office January 15, 1861 – March 6, 1861
- President: James Buchanan; Abraham Lincoln
- Preceded by: Philip Thomas
- Succeeded by: Salmon P. Chase

Postmaster of New York City
- In office May 17, 1860 – January 15, 1861

United States Senator from New York
- In office January 27, 1845 – March 3, 1849
- Preceded by: Henry A. Foster
- Succeeded by: William H. Seward

Member of the New York State Assembly from Albany County
- In office January 4, 1842 – September 7, 1842

16th Secretary of State of New York
- In office January 15, 1833 – February 4, 1839
- Governor: William L. Marcy; William H. Seward
- Preceded by: Azariah C. Flagg
- Succeeded by: John Spencer

Personal details
- Born: July 24, 1798 Boscawen, New Hampshire, U.S.
- Died: April 21, 1879 (aged 80) New York City, U.S.
- Party: Democratic (Before 1872); Republican (1872–1879)
- Other political affiliations: Free Soil (1848–1849)
- Spouse: Catherine Morgan
- Children: Morgan

Military service
- Allegiance: United States
- Branch/service: United States Army; Union Army
- Years of service: 1813–1828; 1861–1865
- Rank: Major General
- Commands: Department of Virginia
- Battles/wars: American Civil War

John Adams Dix (July 24, 1798 – April 21, 1879) was an American politician and military officer who was Secretary of the Treasury, Governor of New York and Union major general during the Civil War. He was notable for arresting the pro-Southern Maryland General Assembly, preventing that divided border state from seceding, and for arranging a system for prisoner exchange via the Dix–Hill Cartel, concluded in partnership with Confederate Major General Daniel Harvey Hill.

== Biography ==
Dix was born in Boscawen, New Hampshire, on July 24, 1798, the son of Timothy Dix and Abigail Wilkins, and brother of composer Marion Dix Sullivan. He was educated at Phillips Exeter Academy, and joined the US Army as an ensign in May 1813, serving under his father until the latter's death a few months later. He attained the rank of captain in August 1825 and resigned from the Army in December 1828.

In 1826, Dix married Catherine Morgan, the adopted daughter of Congressman John J. Morgan, who gave Dix a job overseeing his upstate New York land holdings in Cooperstown. Dix and his wife moved to Cooperstown in 1828, where he also practiced law. In 1830, he was appointed by Governor Enos T. Throop to succeed Matthew H. Webster as Adjutant General of New York, and moved to Albany. He was Secretary of State of New York from 1833 to 1839, and a member of the New York State Assembly (Albany Co.) in 1842.

=== U.S. Senator ===
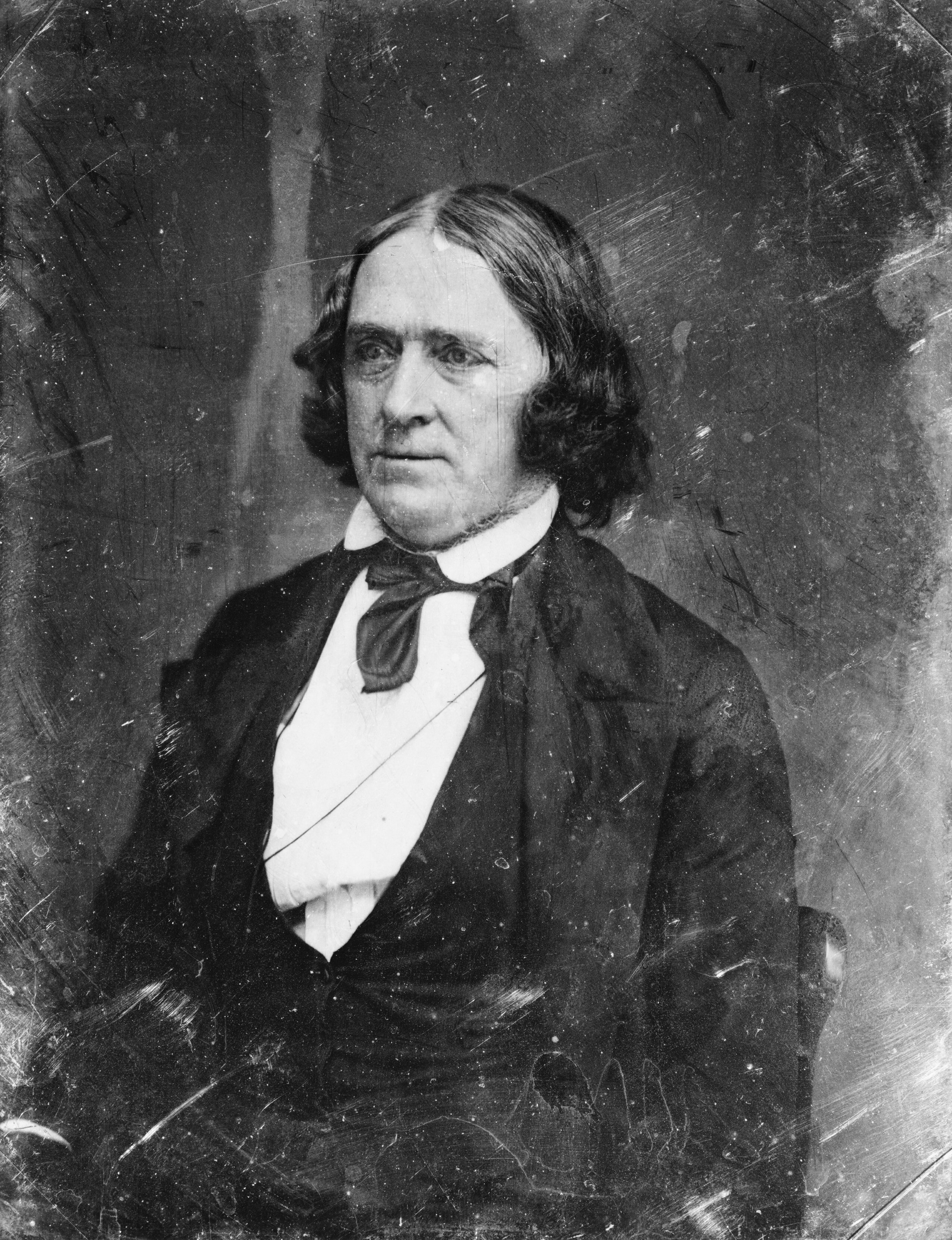
Dix during his Senate term

Dix was elected as a Democrat to the United States Senate to fill the vacancy caused by the resignation of Silas Wright, Jr., and held office from 1845 to 1849. In November 1848, he was the Barnburner/Free-Soil candidate for Governor of New York, but was defeated by Whig Hamilton Fish. In February 1849, he ran for re-election to the U.S. Senate as the Barnburners' candidate, but the Whig majority of the State Legislature elected William H. Seward.

=== Railroad president and postmaster ===
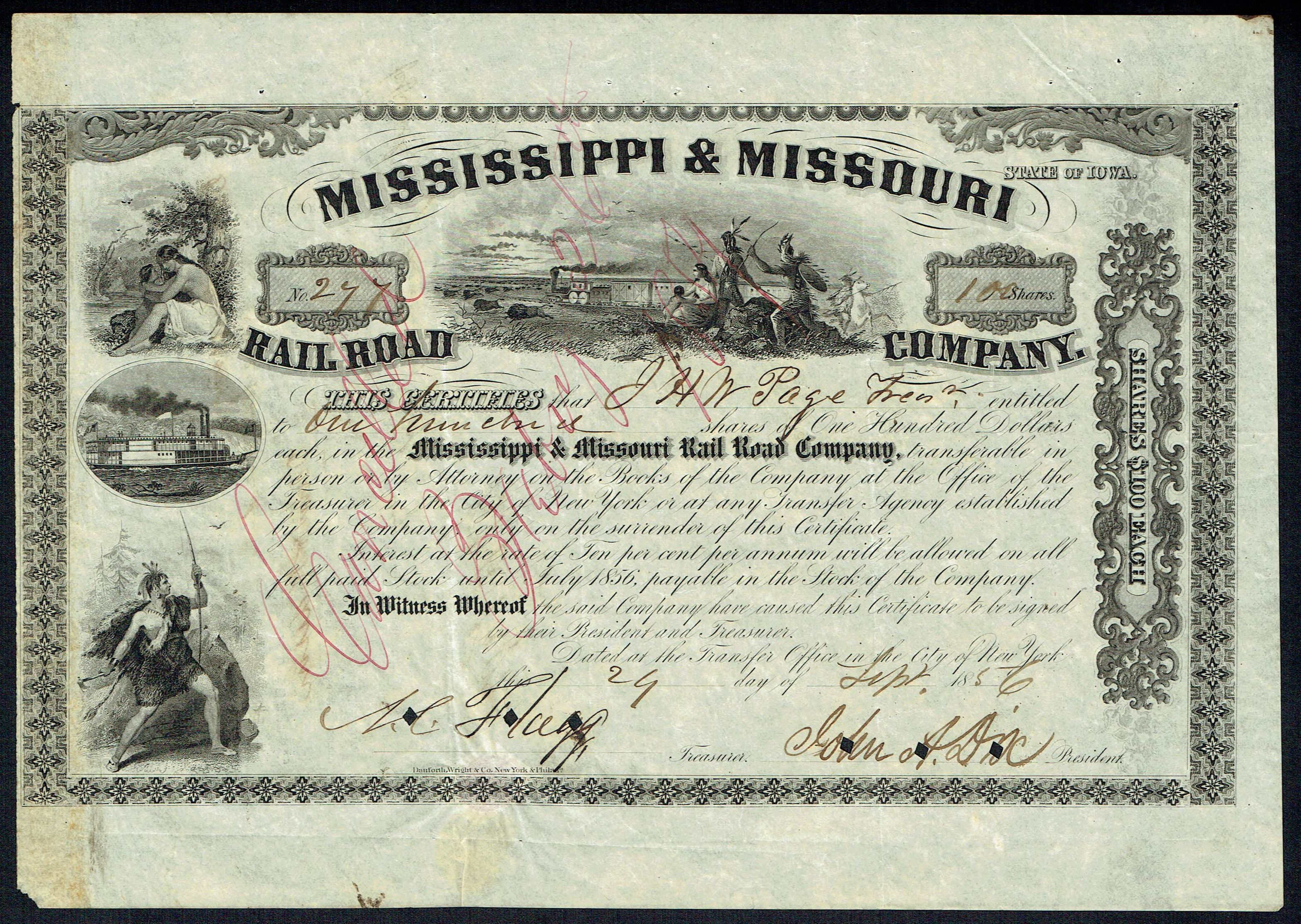
Share of the Mississippi & Missouri Railroad Company, issued 24. September 1856 and signed by John Adams Dix

In 1853 Dix was president of the Mississippi and Missouri Railroad. He was appointed Postmaster of New York City and served from 1860 to 1861.

In addition to his military and public duties, Dix was the president of the Union Pacific from 1863 to 1868 during construction of the First transcontinental railroad. He was the figurehead for rail baron Thomas C. Durant, in both of his railroad presidencies. He was also briefly president of the Erie Railroad in 1872.

=== Civil War service ===
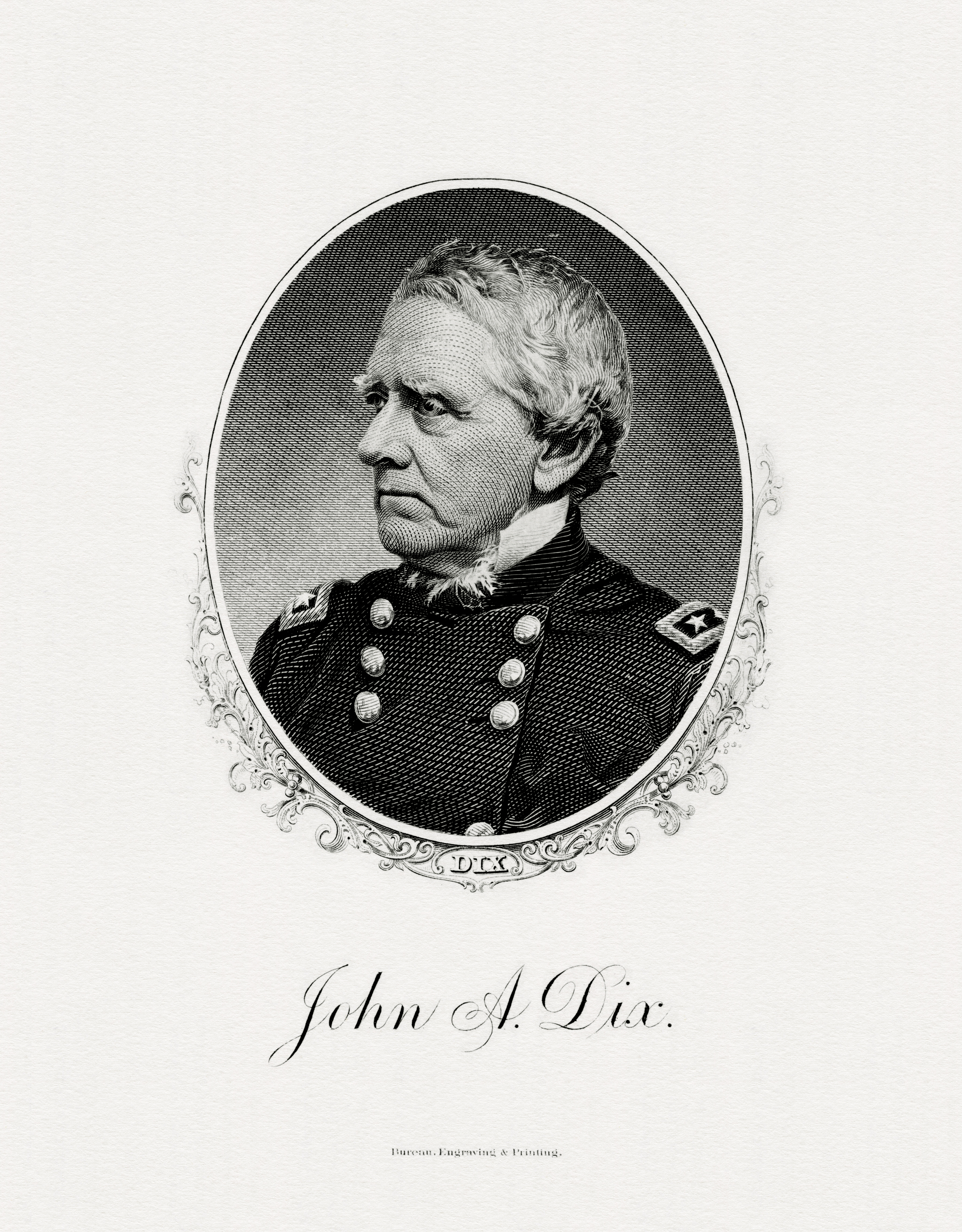
Line engraving of Dix from a US Treasury specimen book, c. 1902

Dix was appointed United States Secretary of the Treasury by President James Buchanan in January 1861 for the remainder of the lame duck president's term, ending on March 4. At the outbreak of the Civil War, he sent a telegram to the Treasury agents in New Orleans ordering that: "If any one attempts to haul down the American flag, shoot him on the spot." Although the telegram was intercepted by Confederates, and was never delivered to the Treasury agents, the text found its way to the press, and Dix became one of the first heroes of the North during the Civil War. The saying is found on many Civil War tokens minted during the war, although the wording is slightly modified.

==== Major general ====
At the start of the American Civil War, Dix was appointed a major general in the New York Militia. With George Opdyke and Richard Milford Blatchford, he formed the Union Defense Committee, empowered by President Abraham Lincoln to spend public money during the initial raising and equipping of the Union Army. He joined the Union Army as the highest ranking major general of volunteers during the war, effective May 16, 1861; also appointed on that day were Nathaniel P. Banks and Benjamin Franklin Butler, but Dix's name appeared first on the promotion list, meaning that he had seniority over all major generals of volunteers. In the summer of 1861, he commanded the Department of Maryland and the Department of Pennsylvania. His importance at the beginning of the Civil War was in arresting six members of the Maryland General Assembly and thereby preventing the legislature from meeting. This prevented Maryland from seceding, and earned him President Lincoln's gratitude. That winter, he commanded a regional organization known as "Dix's Command" within Maj. Gen. George B. McClellan's Department of the Potomac. Dix commanded the Department of Virginia from June 1862 until July 1863, and the Department of the East from July 1863 until April 1865.

On July 22, 1862, Dix and Confederate Major General Daniel Harvey Hill concluded an agreement for the general exchange of prisoners between the Union and Confederate armies. This agreement became known as the Dix-Hill Cartel. It established a scale of equivalents, where an officer would be exchanged for a fixed number of enlisted men, and also allowed for the parole of prisoners, who would undertake not to serve in a military capacity until officially exchanged. (The cartel worked well for a few months, but broke down when Confederates insisted on treating black prisoners as fugitive slaves and returning them to their previous owners.)

On October 10, 1862, Lincoln's Secretary of the Navy, Gideon Welles wrote that "a scheme for permits, special favors, Treasury agents, and improper management" existed and was arranged by Treasury Secretary Salmon P. Chase for General John A. Dix. The motive of Chase appeared to be for political influence and not for financial gain.

Dix was considered too old for field command. Some believe that his most distinguished contribution to the war was the suppression of the New York City draft riots in July 1863, although the rioting had already subsided by the time he replaced General John E. Wool. He was also active in the defense of Suffolk, which was part of his department. He served as the temporary chairman of the 1866 National Union Convention.

=== Later career ===
He was United States Minister to France from 1866 to 1869.

He was Governor of New York from 1873 to 1874, elected on the Republican ticket in November 1872, but was defeated for re-election by Samuel J. Tilden in November 1874. He suffered another defeat when he ran for the Mayor of New York City in 1876.

=== Death ===
Dix died on April 21, 1879, in New York City at age 80 and was buried at the Trinity Church Cemetery in Lower Manhattan.

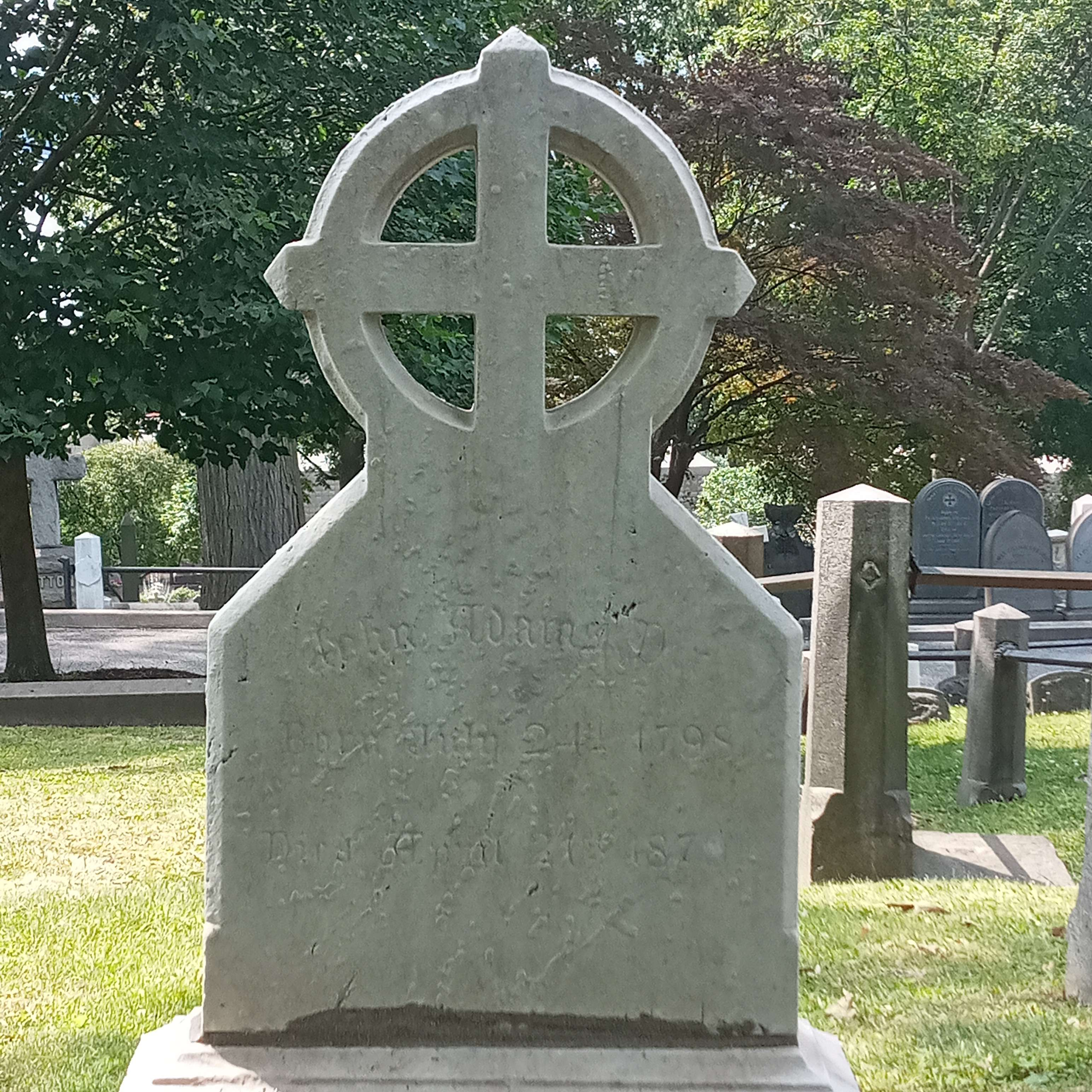
The gravesite of Governor John Adams Dix

== Legacy ==
- His memoirs, contained in two volumes, were compiled by his son, Morgan Dix.
- Fort Dix, a United States Army post in New Jersey, is named for Dix, as is Dix, Illinois, and Dix Township, Ford County, Illinois. Several revenue cutters were also named for him.
- Dix Mountain, one of the Adirondack High Peaks, was named for him. The name was later extended to its entire range.
- There is a memorial to Dix at the Cathedral of All Saints in Albany, New York.
- The windmill at his home in Westhampton Beach, New York was donated to the village, which plans to restore it.

== See also ==
- List of American Civil War generals (Union)

== Notes ==
Political offices
Preceded by Azariah C. Flagg	Secretary of State of New York; 1833–1839	Succeeded by John Spencer
Preceded by John T. Hoffman	Governor of New York; 1873–1874	Succeeded by Samuel J. Tilden
Preceded by Philip Thomas	United States Secretary of the Treasury; 1861	Succeeded by Salmon P. Chase
U.S. Senate
Preceded by Henry A. Foster	U.S. Senator (Class 3) from New York; 1845–1849; Served alongside: Daniel S. Dickinson	Succeeded by William H. Seward
Preceded by William Haywood	Chair of the Senate Commerce Committee; 1846–1849	Succeeded by Hannibal Hamlin
Business positions
Preceded by William Ogden	President of the Union Pacific Railroad; 1863–1865	Succeeded by Oliver Ames Jr.
Preceded by Jay Gould	President of the Erie Railroad; 1872	Succeeded by Peter H. Watson
Diplomatic posts
Preceded by John Bigelow	United States Minister to France; 1866–1869	Succeeded by Elihu B. Washburne
Party political offices
First	Free Soil nominee for Governor of New York; 1848	Succeeded by None
Preceded by Stewart L. Woodford	Republican nominee for Governor of New York; 1872, 1874	Succeeded by Edwin D. Morgan
