= Richard P. Herrick =

American politician (1791–1846)

Member of the U.S. House of Representatives from New York's 12th district
- In office March 4, 1845 – June 20, 1846
- Preceded by: David L. Seymour
- Succeeded by: Thomas C. Ripley

Member of the New York State Assembly from the Rensselaer district
- In office January 1, 1839 – December 31, 1839 Serving with Day O. Kellogg, Gideon Reynolds

Personal details
- Born: Richard Platt Herrick; March 23, 1791 Greenbush, New York, U.S.
- Died: June 20, 1846 (aged 55) Washington, D.C., U.S.
- Resting place: Greenbush Cemetery, Rensselaer, New York, U.S.
- Party: Whig
- Profession: Politician

Richard Platt Herrick (March 23, 1791 – June 20, 1846) was a U.S. representative from New York.

== Biography ==
Richard P. Herrick was born in Greenbush (now Rensselaer), Rensselaer County, New York on March 23, 1791. He was educated locally, trained as a merchant, and owned and operated a general store.

Herrick served in local office, including secretary of the health board, school board member, member of the village board of trustees and president of the board. He served in the New York State Assembly in 1839.

Herrick was elected as a Whig to the Twenty-ninth Congress and served from March 4, 1845 until his death in Washington, D.C. on June 20, 1846.

He was interred at Greenbush Cemetery in Rensselaer. There is a cenotaph to his memory at Congressional Cemetery.

== See also ==
- List of members of the United States Congress who died in office (1790–1899)

== Sources ==
- United States Congress. "Richard P. Herrick (id: H000541)". Biographical Directory of the United States Congress.

U.S. House of Representatives
Preceded by David L. Seymour	Member of the U.S. House of Representatives from New York's 12th congressional district March 4, 1845 – June 20, 1846	Succeeded by Thomas C. Ripley
