= New York's 12th congressional district =

U.S. House district for New York

- Interactive map of district boundaries since January 3, 2023
- Representative: Jerry Nadler; D–Manhattan
- Distribution: 100% urban; 0% rural
- Population (2025): 771,985
- Median household income: $164,020
- Ethnicity: 65.2% White; 14.1% Asian; 11.2% Hispanic; 4.7% Black; 3.9% Two or more races; 0.9% other
- Cook PVI: D+33

New York's 12th congressional district is a congressional district for the United States House of Representatives in New York City. As of 2023, it is represented by Democrat Jerry Nadler, redistricted incumbent of the former 10th congressional district, who defeated incumbent Carolyn Maloney in the 2022 Democratic primary. Nadler is not running for reelection in 2026. The redrawn District 12 includes the Upper West Side constituency (former District 10) represented by Nadler since the 1990s, the Upper East Side, and all of Midtown Manhattan. With a Cook Partisan Voting Index rating of D+33, it is the most Democratic district in New York and tied with California's 37th district (D+33) and Alabama's 4th district (R+33) for the ninth most extreme. The district is the smallest congressional district by area in the U.S. The 12th district's per capita income, in excess of $237,000, is the highest among all US congressional districts.

== Recent election results from statewide races ==
Year	Office	Results
2008	President	Obama 81–18%
2012	President	Obama 78–22%
2016	President	Clinton 83–13%
2016	Senate	Schumer 83–14%
2018	Senate	Gillibrand 87–13%
2018	Governor	Cuomo 83–13%
2018	Attorney General	James 83–15%
2020	President	Biden 85–14%
2022	Senate	Schumer 83–16%
2022	Governor	Hochul 80–20%
2022	Attorney General	James 80–20%
2022	Comptroller	DiNapoli 81–19%
2024	President	Harris 81–17%
2024	Senate	Gillibrand 81–18%

== History ==
During the Civil War, the 12th District comprised the counties of Dutchess and Columbia. The 12th District eventually became a Brooklyn district in the mid-1960s, as the result of a district realignment due to the Supreme Court's decision in the Cooper v. Power case in 1966. The district was realigned to include majority African American neighborhoods such as Bedford-Stuyvesant in Central Brooklyn. Until 1992, it was the Central Brooklyn district now held by Yvette Clarke (and formerly by Major Owens), and then remapped to include Hispanic neighborhoods in Lower Manhattan and Queens. It is the third wealthiest congressional district in the United States and the wealthiest congressional district in New York state, with 39.7 percent of households earning over $200,000, per a 2024 study.

1803–1913:

Dutchess County, Columbia County

1913–1945:

Parts of Manhattan

1945–1993:

Parts of Brooklyn

1993–2023:

Parts of Brooklyn, Manhattan, Queens

From 2003 to 2013, it included parts of Brooklyn, Queens, and Manhattan. It included the Queens neighborhoods of Maspeth, Ridgewood, and Woodside; the Brooklyn neighborhoods of Bushwick, Greenpoint, Red Hook, East New York, Brooklyn Heights, Sunset Park, and Williamsburg; and part of Manhattan's Lower East Side and East Village. Prior to the 2010s redistricting, the district included several neighborhoods in the East Side of Manhattan, the Greenpoint section of Brooklyn, and western Queens, as well as Roosevelt Island, mostly overlapping the pre-redistricting 14th district.

2023–:

Parts of Manhattan

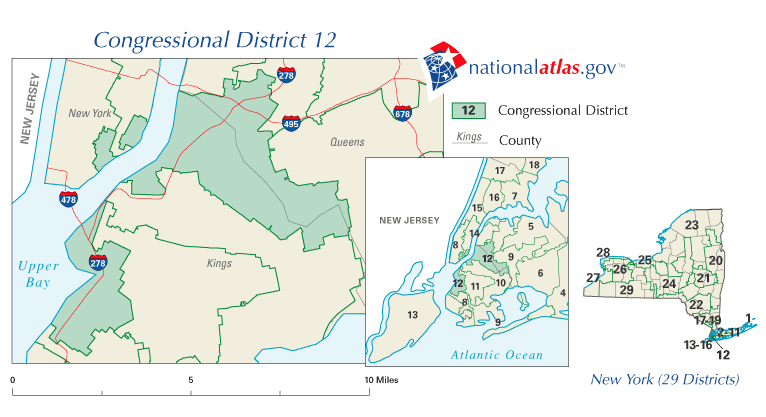
2003–2013

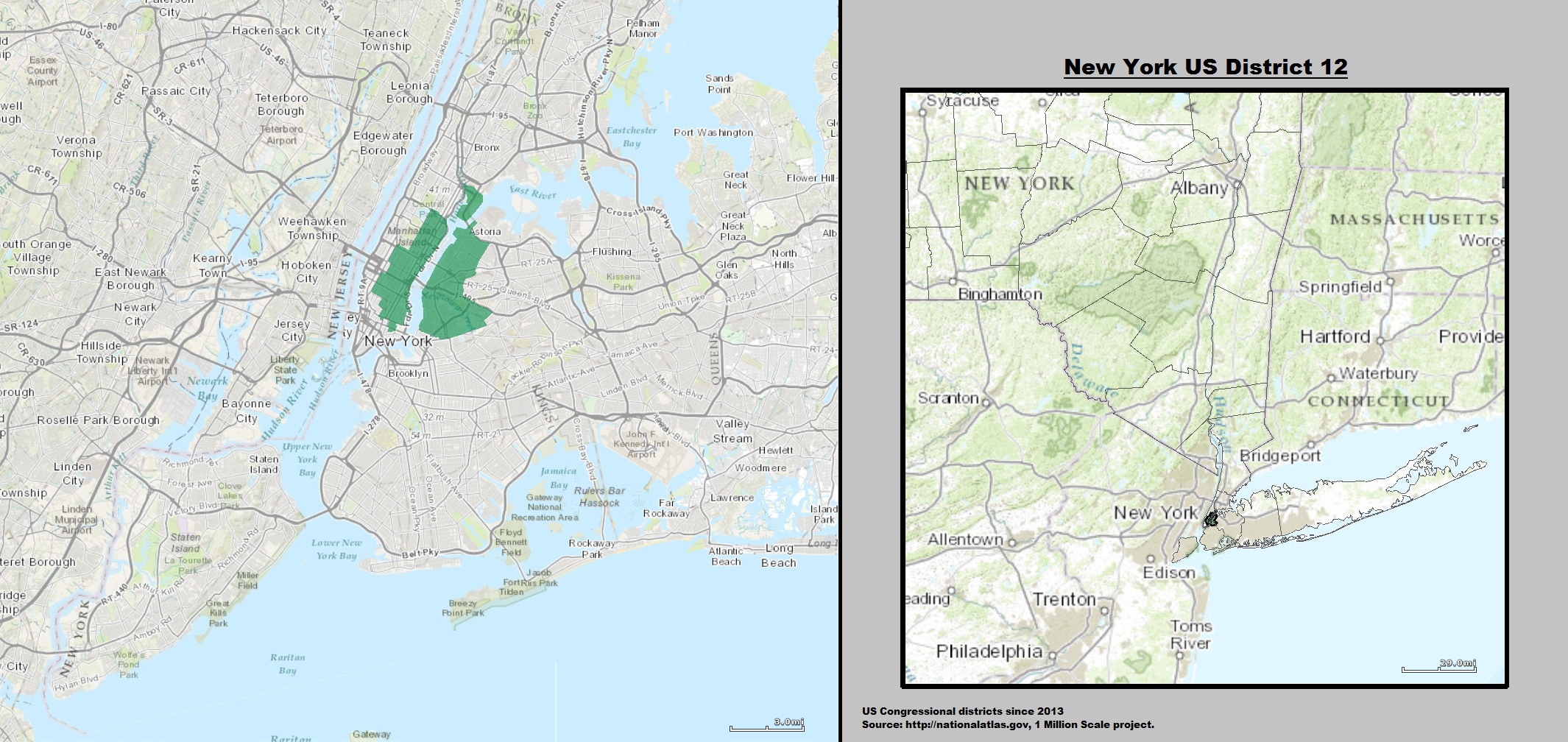
2013–2023

== Current composition ==
The 12th district is located entirely in the New York City borough of Manhattan. Manhattan neighborhoods in the district include:

- Carnegie Hill
- Chelsea
- Flatiron
- Gramercy
- Hell's Kitchen
- Hudson Yards
- Kips Bay
- Lenox Hill
- Lincoln Square
- Manhattan Valley
- Midtown
- Midtown South
- Murray Hill
- Roosevelt Island
- Stuyvesant Town–Peter Cooper Village
- Times Square
- Turtle Bay
- Tudor City
- Union Square
- Upper East Side
- Upper West Side
- Yorkville

== List of members representing the district ==
=== 1803–1813: one seat ===
Representative	Party	Years	Cong ress	Electoral history
District established March 4, 1803
David Thomas (Salem)	Democratic- Republican	March 4, 1803 – February 17, 1808 (Note: David Thomas was appointed New York State Treasurer on February 5, 1808, and resigned his seat. His letter of resignation was read in the House on February 17.)	8th 9th 10th	Redistricted from the 7th district and re-elected in 1802. Re-elected in 1804. Re-elected in 1806. Resigned to become New York State Treasurer.
Vacant		February 17, 1808 – November 7, 1808	10th	
Nathan Wilson (Salem)	Democratic- Republican	November 7, 1808 – March 3, 1809	10th	Elected to finish Thomas's term. Retired.
Erastus Root (Delhi)	Democratic- Republican	March 4, 1809 – March 3, 1811	11th	Elected in 1808. [data missing]
Arunah Metcalf (Otsego)	Democratic- Republican	March 4, 1811 – March 3, 1813	12th	Re-elected in 1810. [data missing]

=== 1813–1823: two seats ===
From 1813 to 1823, two seats were apportioned to the District, elected at-large on a general ticket.

Cong ress	Years	Seat A			Seat B			Location
Cong ress	Years	Representative	Party	Electoral history	Representative	Party	Electoral history	Location
13th	March 4, 1813 – March 3, 1815	Zebulon R. Shipherd (Granville)	Federalist	Elected in 1812. [data missing]	Elisha I. Winter (Peru)	Federalist	Elected in 1812. [data missing]	1813–1823; Clinton, Essex, Franklin, Washington and Warren counties
14th	March 4, 1815 – December 7, 1815	Vacant		Member-elect Benjamin Pond died October 6, 1814.	John Savage (Salem)	Democratic-Republican	Elected in 1814. [data missing]	1813–1823; Clinton, Essex, Franklin, Washington and Warren counties
14th	December 7, 1815 – March 3, 1817	Asa Adgate (Chesterfield)	Democratic-Republican	Elected to finish Pond's term. [data missing]	John Savage (Salem)	Democratic-Republican	Elected in 1814. [data missing]	1813–1823; Clinton, Essex, Franklin, Washington and Warren counties
15th	March 4, 1817 – March 3, 1819	John Palmer (Plattsburg)	Democratic-Republican	Elected in 1816. [data missing]	John Savage (Salem)	Democratic-Republican	Elected in 1814. [data missing]	1813–1823; Clinton, Essex, Franklin, Washington and Warren counties
16th	March 4, 1819 – March 3, 1821	Ezra C. Gross (Elizabeth)	Democratic-Republican	Elected in 1818. Lost re-election.	Nathaniel Pitcher (Sandy Hill)	Democratic-Republican	Elected in 1818. Re-elected in 1821. [data missing]	1813–1823; Clinton, Essex, Franklin, Washington and Warren counties
17th	March 4, 1821 – December 3, 1821	Vacant		Elections were held in April 1821. It is unclear when results were announced or credentials issued.	Nathaniel Pitcher (Sandy Hill)	Democratic-Republican	Elected in 1818. Re-elected in 1821. [data missing]	1813–1823; Clinton, Essex, Franklin, Washington and Warren counties
17th	December 3, 1821 – March 3, 1823	Reuben H. Walworth (Plattsburg)	Democratic-Republican	Elected in 1821.	Nathaniel Pitcher (Sandy Hill)	Democratic-Republican	Elected in 1818. Re-elected in 1821. [data missing]	1813–1823; Clinton, Essex, Franklin, Washington and Warren counties

=== 1823–present: one seat ===
Representative	Party	Years	Cong ress	Electoral history	Location
Lewis Eaton (Schoharie Bridge)	Democratic-Republican	March 4, 1823 – March 3, 1825	18th	Elected in 1822. [data missing]	1823–1833; Schenectady and Schoharie counties
William Dietz (Schoharie)	Jacksonian	March 4, 1825 – March 3, 1827	19th	Elected in 1824. [data missing]	1823–1833; Schenectady and Schoharie counties
John I. De Graff (Schenectady)	Jacksonian	March 4, 1827 – March 3, 1829	20th	Elected in 1826. [data missing]	1823–1833; Schenectady and Schoharie counties
Peter I. Borst (Middleburg)	Jacksonian	March 4, 1829 – March 3, 1831	21st	Elected in 1828. [data missing]	1823–1833; Schenectady and Schoharie counties
Joseph Bouck (Middleburg)	Jacksonian	March 4, 1831 – March 3, 1833	22nd	Elected in 1830. [data missing]	1823–1833; Schenectady and Schoharie counties
Henry C. Martindale (Sandy Hill)	Anti-Masonic	March 4, 1833 – March 3, 1835	23rd	Elected in 1832. [data missing]	1833–1843 [data missing]
David Abel Russell (Salem)	Anti-Jacksonian	March 4, 1835 – March 3, 1837	24th 25th 26th	Elected in 1834. Re-elected in 1836. Re-elected in 1838. [data missing]	1833–1843 [data missing]
David Abel Russell (Salem)	Whig	March 4, 1837 – March 3, 1841	24th 25th 26th	Elected in 1834. Re-elected in 1836. Re-elected in 1838. [data missing]	1833–1843 [data missing]
Bernard Blair (Salem)	Whig	March 4, 1841 – March 3, 1843	27th	Elected in 1840. [data missing]	1833–1843 [data missing]
David L. Seymour (Troy)	Democratic	March 4, 1843 – March 3, 1845	28th	Elected in 1842. [data missing]	1843–1853 [data missing]
Richard P. Herrick (Greenbush)	Whig	March 4, 1845 – June 20, 1846	29th	Elected in 1844. Died.	1843–1853 [data missing]
Vacant		June 20, 1846 – December 7, 1846	29th		1843–1853 [data missing]
Thomas C. Ripley (Schaghticoke)	Whig	December 7, 1846 – March 3, 1847	29th	Elected to finish Herrick's term. [data missing]	1843–1853 [data missing]
Gideon Reynolds (Hoosick)	Whig	March 4, 1847 – March 3, 1851	30th 31st	Elected in 1846. Re-elected in 1848. [data missing]	1843–1853 [data missing]
David L. Seymour (Troy)	Democratic	March 4, 1851 – March 3, 1853	32nd	Elected in 1850. [data missing]	1843–1853 [data missing]
Gilbert Dean (Poughkeepsie)	Democratic	March 4, 1853 – July 3, 1854	33rd	Redistricted from 8th district and re-elected in 1852. Resigned to become justice to Supreme Court of New York.	1853–1863 [data missing]
Vacant		July 3, 1854 – November 7, 1854	33rd		1853–1863 [data missing]
Isaac Teller (Matteawan)	Whig	November 7, 1854 – March 3, 1855	33rd	Elected to finish Dean's term. [data missing]	1853–1863 [data missing]
Killian Miller (Hudson)	Opposition	March 4, 1855 – March 3, 1857	34th	Elected in 1854. [data missing]	1853–1863 [data missing]
John Thompson (Poughkeepsie)	Republican	March 4, 1857 – March 3, 1859	35th	Elected in 1856. [data missing]	1853–1863 [data missing]
Charles Lewis Beale (Kinderhook)	Republican	March 4, 1859 – March 3, 1861	36th	Elected in 1858. [data missing]	1853–1863 [data missing]
Stephen Baker (Poughkeepsie)	Republican	March 4, 1861 – March 3, 1863	37th	Elected in 1860. [data missing]	1853–1863 [data missing]
Homer A. Nelson (Poughkeepsie)	Democratic	March 4, 1863 – March 3, 1865	38th	Elected in 1862. [data missing]	1863–1873 [data missing]
John H. Ketcham (Dover Plains)	Republican	March 4, 1865 – March 3, 1873	39th 40th 41st 42nd	Re-elected in 1864. Re-elected in 1866. Re-elected in 1868. Re-elected in 1870. [data missing]	1863–1873 [data missing]
Charles St. John (Port Jervis)	Republican	March 4, 1873 – March 3, 1875	43rd	Redistricted from 11th district and re-elected in 1872. [data missing]	1873–1883 [data missing]
N. Holmes Odell (White Plains)	Democratic	March 4, 1875 – March 3, 1877	44th	Elected in 1874. [data missing]	1873–1883 [data missing]
Clarkson Nott Potter (New Rochelle)	Democratic	March 4, 1877 – March 3, 1879	45th	Elected in 1876. [data missing]	1873–1883 [data missing]
Vacant		March 3, 1879 – November 3, 1879	46th	Representative-elect Alexander Smith died November 5, 1878.	1873–1883 [data missing]
Waldo Hutchins (The Bronx)	Democratic	November 4, 1879 – March 3, 1885	46th 47th 48th	Elected to finish Smith's term. Re-elected in 1880. Re-elected in 1882. Retired.	1873–1883 [data missing]
Waldo Hutchins (The Bronx)	Democratic	November 4, 1879 – March 3, 1885	46th 47th 48th	Elected to finish Smith's term. Re-elected in 1880. Re-elected in 1882. Retired.	1883–1893 [data missing]
Abraham Dowdney (New York)	Democratic	March 4, 1885 – December 10, 1886	49th	Elected in 1884. Died.	1883–1893 [data missing]
Vacant		December 10, 1886 – March 3, 1887	49th		1883–1893 [data missing]
William Bourke Cockran (New York)	Democratic	March 4, 1887 – March 3, 1889	50th	Elected in 1886. [data missing]	1883–1893 [data missing]
Roswell P. Flower (New York)	Democratic	March 4, 1889 – September 16, 1891	51st 52nd	Elected in 1888. Re-elected in 1890. Resigned to become Governor of New York.	1883–1893 [data missing]
Vacant		September 16, 1891 – November 3, 1891	52nd		1883–1893 [data missing]
Joseph J. Little (New York)	Democratic	November 3, 1891 – March 3, 1893	52nd	Elected to finish Flower's term. [data missing]	1883–1893 [data missing]
William Bourke Cockran (New York)	Democratic	March 4, 1893 – March 3, 1895	53rd	Redistricted from 10th district and re-elected in 1892. [data missing]	1893–1903 [data missing]
George B. McClellan Jr. (New York)	Democratic	March 4, 1895 – December 21, 1903	54th 55th 56th 57th 58th	Elected in 1894. Re-elected in 1896. Re-elected in 1898. Re-elected in 1900. Re-elected in 1902. Resigned to become Mayor of New York City.	1893–1903 [data missing]
George B. McClellan Jr. (New York)	Democratic	March 4, 1895 – December 21, 1903	54th 55th 56th 57th 58th	Elected in 1894. Re-elected in 1896. Re-elected in 1898. Re-elected in 1900. Re-elected in 1902. Resigned to become Mayor of New York City.	1903–1913 [data missing]
Vacant		December 21, 1903 – February 23, 1904	58th		1903–1913 [data missing]
William Bourke Cockran (New York)	Democratic	February 23, 1904 – March 3, 1909	58th 59th 60th	Elected to finish McClellan's term. Re-elected in 1904. Re-elected in 1906. [data missing]	1903–1913 [data missing]
Michael F. Conry (New York)	Democratic	March 4, 1909 – March 3, 1913	61st 62nd	Elected in 1908. Re-elected in 1910. Redistricted to 15th district.	1903–1913 [data missing]
Henry M. Goldfogle (New York)	Democratic	March 4, 1913 – March 3, 1915	63rd	Redistricted from 9th district and re-elected in 1912. Lost re-election.	1913–1923 [data missing]
Meyer London (New York)	Socialist	March 4, 1915 – March 3, 1919	64th 65th	Elected in 1914. Re-elected in 1916. Lost re-election.	1913–1923 [data missing]
Henry M. Goldfogle (New York)	Democratic	March 4, 1919 – March 3, 1921	66th	Elected in 1918. [data missing]	1913–1923 [data missing]
Meyer London (New York)	Socialist	March 4, 1921 – March 3, 1923	67th	Elected in 1920. [data missing]	1913–1923 [data missing]
Samuel Dickstein (New York)	Democratic	March 4, 1923 – January 3, 1945	68th 69th 70th 71st 72nd 73rd 74th 75th 76th 77th 78th	Elected in 1922. Re-elected in 1924. Re-elected in 1926. Re-elected in 1928. Re-elected in 1930. Re-elected in 1932. Re-elected in 1934. Re-elected in 1936. Re-elected in 1938. Re-elected in 1940. Re-elected in 1942. Redistricted to 19th district.	1923–1933 [data missing]
Samuel Dickstein (New York)	Democratic	March 4, 1923 – January 3, 1945	68th 69th 70th 71st 72nd 73rd 74th 75th 76th 77th 78th	Elected in 1922. Re-elected in 1924. Re-elected in 1926. Re-elected in 1928. Re-elected in 1930. Re-elected in 1932. Re-elected in 1934. Re-elected in 1936. Re-elected in 1938. Re-elected in 1940. Re-elected in 1942. Redistricted to 19th district.	1933–1943 [data missing]
Samuel Dickstein (New York)	Democratic	March 4, 1923 – January 3, 1945	68th 69th 70th 71st 72nd 73rd 74th 75th 76th 77th 78th	Elected in 1922. Re-elected in 1924. Re-elected in 1926. Re-elected in 1928. Re-elected in 1930. Re-elected in 1932. Re-elected in 1934. Re-elected in 1936. Re-elected in 1938. Re-elected in 1940. Re-elected in 1942. Redistricted to 19th district.	1943–1953 [data missing]
John J. Rooney (Brooklyn)	Democratic	January 3, 1945 – January 3, 1953	79th 80th 81st 82nd	Redistricted from 4th district and re-elected in 1944. Re-elected in 1946. Re-elected in 1948. Re-elected in 1950. Redistricted to 14th district.	1943–1953 [data missing]
Francis E. Dorn (Brooklyn)	Republican	January 3, 1953 – January 3, 1961	83rd 84th 85th 86th	Elected in 1952. Re-elected in 1954. Re-elected in 1956. Re-elected in 1958. [data missing]	1953–1963 [data missing]
Hugh Carey (Brooklyn)	Democratic	January 3, 1961 – January 3, 1963	87th	Elected in 1960. Redistricted to 15th district.	1953–1963 [data missing]
Edna F. Kelly (Brooklyn)	Democratic	January 3, 1963 – January 3, 1969	88th 89th 90th	Redistricted from the 10th district and re-elected in 1962. Re-elected in 1964. Re-elected in 1966. Ran in the 10th district and lost renomination.	1963–1973 [data missing]
Shirley Chisholm (Brooklyn)	Democratic	January 3, 1969 – January 3, 1983	91st 92nd 93rd 94th 95th 96th 97th	Elected in 1968. Re-elected in 1970. Re-elected in 1972. Re-elected in 1974. Re-elected in 1976. Re-elected in 1978. Re-elected in 1980. Retired.	1963–1973 [data missing]
Shirley Chisholm (Brooklyn)	Democratic	January 3, 1969 – January 3, 1983	91st 92nd 93rd 94th 95th 96th 97th	Elected in 1968. Re-elected in 1970. Re-elected in 1972. Re-elected in 1974. Re-elected in 1976. Re-elected in 1978. Re-elected in 1980. Retired.	1973–1983 [data missing]
Major Owens (Brooklyn)	Democratic	January 3, 1983 – January 3, 1993	98th 99th 100th 101st 102nd	Elected in 1982. Re-elected in 1984. Re-elected in 1986. Re-elected in 1988. Re-elected in 1990. Redistricted to 11th district.	1983–1993 [data missing]
Nydia Velázquez (Brooklyn)	Democratic	January 3, 1993 – January 3, 2013	103rd 104th 105th 106th 107th 108th 109th 110th 111th 112th	Elected in 1992. Re-elected in 1994. Re-elected in 1996. Re-elected in 1998. Re-elected in 2000. Re-elected in 2002. Re-elected in 2004. Re-elected in 2006. Re-elected in 2008. Re-elected in 2010. Redistricted to 7th district.	1993–2003 [data missing]
Nydia Velázquez (Brooklyn)	Democratic	January 3, 1993 – January 3, 2013	103rd 104th 105th 106th 107th 108th 109th 110th 111th 112th	Elected in 1992. Re-elected in 1994. Re-elected in 1996. Re-elected in 1998. Re-elected in 2000. Re-elected in 2002. Re-elected in 2004. Re-elected in 2006. Re-elected in 2008. Re-elected in 2010. Redistricted to 7th district.	2003–2013 Parts of Brooklyn, Manhattan, Queens
Carolyn Maloney (New York)	Democratic	January 3, 2013 – January 3, 2023	113th 114th 115th 116th 117th	Redistricted from 14th district and re-elected in 2012. Re-elected in 2014. Re-elected in 2016. Re-elected in 2018. Re-elected in 2020. Lost re-nomination in 2022.	2013–2023 Parts of Brooklyn, Manhattan, Queens
Jerry Nadler (New York)	Democratic	January 3, 2023 – present	118th 119th	Redistricted from the 10th district and re-elected in 2022. Re-elected in 2024. Retiring at the end of term.	2023–2025 Parts of Manhattan
Jerry Nadler (New York)	Democratic	January 3, 2023 – present	118th 119th	Redistricted from the 10th district and re-elected in 2022. Re-elected in 2024. Retiring at the end of term.	2025–present Parts of Manhattan
Micah Lasher (New York)	Democratic	Assuming office on January 3, 2027		Elected in 2026.	2025–present Parts of Manhattan

== Recent elections ==
In New York, there are numerous minor parties at various points on the political spectrum. Certain parties will invariably endorse either the Republican or Democratic candidate for every office; hence, the state electoral results contain both the party votes, and the final candidate votes (Listed as "Recap").

US House election, 1996: New York District 12
Party	Candidate	Votes	%	±%
Democratic	Nydia Velázquez (incumbent)	61,913	84.6	
Republican	Miguel I. Prado	9,978	13.6	
Socialist Workers	Eleanor Garcia	1,283	1.8	
Majority		51,935	71.0	
Turnout		73,174	100	

US House election, 1998: New York District 12
Party	Candidate	Votes	%	±%
Democratic	Nydia Velázquez (incumbent)	53,269	83.6	−1.0
Republican	Rosemary Markgraf	7,405	11.6	−2.0
Conservative	Angel Diaz	1,632	2.6	+2.6
Liberal	Hector Cortes, Jr.	1,400	2.2	+2.2
Majority		45,864	72.0	+1.0
Turnout		63,706	100	−12.9

US House election, 2000: New York District 12
Party	Candidate	Votes	%	±%
Democratic	Nydia Velázquez (incumbent)	86,288	87.1	+3.5
Republican	Rosemary Markgraf	10,052	10.1	−1.5
Socialist	Paul Pederson	1,025	1.0	+1.0
Right to Life	Mildred Rosario	865	0.9	+0.9
Conservative	Cesar Estevez	850	0.9	−1.7
Majority		76,236	76.9	+4.9
Turnout		99,080	100	+55.5

US House election, 2002: New York District 12
Party	Candidate	Votes	%	±%
Democratic	Nydia Velázquez (incumbent)	48,408	95.8	+8.7
Conservative	Cesar Estevez	2,119	4.2	+3.3
Majority		46,289	91.6	+14.7
Turnout		50,527	100	−49.0

US House election, 2004: New York District 12
Party	Candidate	Votes	%	±%
Democratic	Nydia Velázquez (incumbent)	107,796	86.3	−9.5
Republican	Paul A. Rodriguez	17,166	13.7	+13.7
Majority		90,630	72.5	−19.1
Turnout		124,962	100	+147.3

US House election, 2006: New York District 12
Party	Candidate	Votes	%	±%
Democratic	Nydia Velázquez (incumbent)	62,847	89.7	+3.4
Republican	Allan E. Romaguera	7,182	10.3	−3.4
Majority		55,665	79.5	+7.0
Turnout		70,029	100	−44.0

US House election, 2008: New York District 12
Party	Candidate	Votes	%	±%
Democratic	Nydia Velázquez (incumbent)	123,053	90.0	+0.3
Republican	Allan E. Romaguera	13,748	10.0	−0.3
Majority		109,305	80.0	+0.5
Turnout		136,801	100	+95.3

US House election, 2010: New York District 12
Party	Candidate	Votes	%	±%
Democratic	Nydia Velázquez (incumbent)	68,624	93.9	+3.9
Conservative	Alice Gaffney	4,482	6.1	+6.1
Majority		64,142	87.7	+7.7
Turnout		73,106	100	−46.6

US House election, 2012: New York District 12
Party	Candidate	Votes	%	±%
Democratic	Carolyn Maloney	193,455	72.1	−21.8
Republican	Christopher Wight	46,692	17.4	+7.4
Majority		146,763	54.7	−33.0
Turnout		268,287	100	+366.9

US House election, 2014: New York District 12
Party	Candidate	Votes	%	±%
Democratic	Carolyn Maloney (incumbent)	90,603	77.2	+5.1
Republican	Nick Di Iorio	22,731	19.4	+2.0
Majority		67,872	57.8	+3.1
Turnout		117,420	100	−228.5

US House election, 2016: New York District 12
Party	Candidate	Votes	%	±%
Democratic	Carolyn Maloney (incumbent)	244,358	83.2	+6.0
Republican	Robert Ardini	49,398	16.8	−2.6
Majority		194,960	66.4	+8.6
Turnout		293,756	100	+250.2

2018 Democratic primary results
Party	Candidate	Votes	%
Democratic	Carolyn Maloney (incumbent)	26,742	59.6
Democratic	Suraj Patel	18,098	40.4
Total votes		44,840	100.0

US House election, 2018: New York District 12
Party	Candidate	Votes	%	±%
Democratic	Carolyn Maloney (incumbent)	217,430	86.4	+3.2
Republican	Eliot Rabin	30,446	12.1	−4.7
Green	Scott Hutchins	3,728	1.5	N/A
Majority		186,984	74.3	+12.1
Turnout		251,604	100	−16.8

2020 Democratic primary results
Party	Candidate	Votes	%
Democratic	Carolyn Maloney (incumbent)	40,362	42.8
Democratic	Suraj Patel	37,106	39.4
Democratic	Lauren Ashcraft	12,810	13.6
Democratic	Peter Harrison	4,001	4.2
Total votes		94,279	100.0

US House election, 2020: New York District 12
Party	Candidate	Votes	%	±%
Democratic	Carolyn Maloney (incumbent)	265,172	82.0	−4.4
Republican	Carlos Santiago-Cano	53,061	16.0	+3.9
Libertarian	Steven Kolln	4,015	1.0	N/A
Majority		208,096	65.0	−9.3
Turnout		322,248	100	+28.1

2022 Democratic primary results
Party	Candidate	Votes	%
Democratic	Jerrold Nadler (incumbent)	45,545	55.4
Democratic	Carolyn Maloney (incumbent)	20,038	24.4
Democratic	Suraj Patel	15,744	19.2
Democratic	Ashmi Sheth	832	1.0

US House election, 2022: New York District 12
Party	Candidate	Votes	%	±%
Democratic	Jerry Nadler (incumbent)	200,890	81.8	N/A
Republican	Michael Zumbluskas	44,173	18.0	N/A
Independent	Mikhail Itkis	631	0.3	N/A
Majority		156,086	63.5	−1.5
Turnout		245,694	100	−4.2

US House election, 2024: New York District 12
Party	Candidate	Votes	%	±%
Democratic	Jerry Nadler (incumbent)	260,165	80.5	−1.3
Republican	Michael Zumbluskas	61,989	19.5	+1.5
Majority		197,176	61	−2.5
Turnout		323,154	100	

== See also ==
- List of United States congressional districts
- New York's congressional delegations
- New York's congressional districts

== Notes ==
Preceded by Illinois's 1st congressional district	Home district of the president of the United States; January 20, 2017 – September 27, 2019	Succeeded by Florida's 21st congressional district
