= Reuben H. Walworth =

American lawyer and politician (1788–1867)

Reuben Walworth

Chancellor of New York
- In office April 28, 1828 – July 5, 1847
- Governor: Nathaniel Pitcher; Martin Van Buren; Enos Throop; William Marcy; William Seward; William Bouck; Silas Wright; John Young
- Preceded by: Samuel Jones
- Succeeded by: Position abolished

Member of the U.S. House of Representatives from New York's 12th district
- In office March 4, 1821 – March 3, 1823
- Preceded by: Ezra C. Gross
- Succeeded by: Lewis Eaton

Personal details
- Born: October 26, 1788 Bozrah, Connecticut, U.S.
- Died: November 27, 1867 (aged 79) Saratoga Springs, New York, U.S.
- Party: Democratic-Republican (Before 1828); Democratic (1828–1867)
- Spouse: Maria Avery (Deceased 1848) Sarah Ellen (Smith) Hardin (his death)
- Children: 6 (including Mansfield Tracy Walworth)
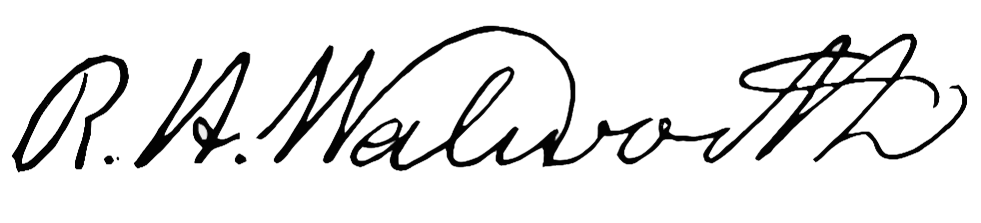
- Signature

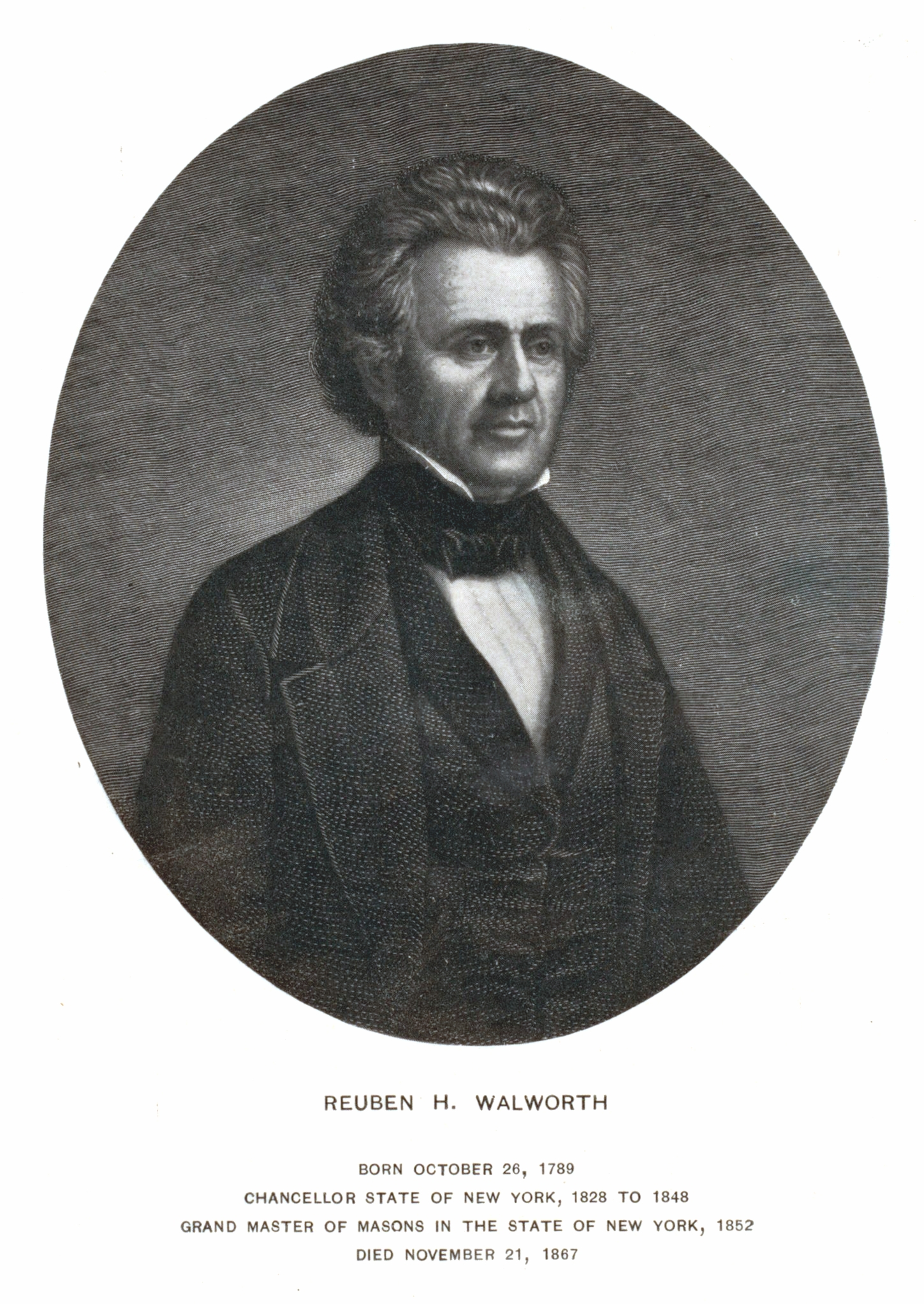
Walworth engraved by Henry S. Sadd

Reuben Hyde Walworth (October 26, 1788 – November 27, 1867) was an American lawyer, jurist and politician. Although nominated three times to the United States Supreme Court by President John Tyler in 1844, the U.S. Senate never attempted a confirmation vote. Known for his simplification of equity law in the United States, Walworth served as a chancery judge in New York for more than three decades, including nearly two decades as Chancellor of New York (1828 to 1847) before a new state constitution abolished that highest statewide judicial office. Walworth also ran unsuccessfully for Governor of New York in 1848, and received a commission from the U.S. Supreme Court in 1850 concerning the Wheeling Suspension Bridge.

== Early life and education ==
Reuben Walworth was the third son of merchant and American Revolutionary War quartermaster Benjamin Walworth (1746–1812), who after that war (in 1782) had married the widow Apphia (Hyde Cardell) Walworth (1757–1837). Reuben Walworth was born in Bozrah, New London County, Connecticut (his mother's hometown), in 1788, and named to honor a maternal uncle. In 1792 Benjamin Walworth received a land grant for his wartime service and moved his family to Hoosick, Rensselaer County, New York, where he operated a mill. They had eleven children; most of their sons became associated with the New York state courts. His eldest, John Walsworth (1784–1839) rose to the rank of Major during the Revolutionary War and moved to Clinton County, New York where he served many years as clerk of the court before in 1829 moving to New York City and serving as Assistant Registrar of the Court of Chancery. Their second son, James Clinton Walworth (1787–1871), would become a merchant in Argyle, New York, before becoming a judge in Otsego County, New York, and serving for decades. The fourth son, Dr. Benjamin Walworth (1792–1879), became a leading citizen of Fredonia and for decades served as judge in Chautauqua County, New York.

Educated in the local schools, Reuben Walworth began teaching school when he was 16 (1804–05). He then began reading law in Troy, the Rensselaer county seat, under the guidance of John Russel. Princeton University would award him an honorary LL.D. degree in 1835, Yale University in 1839 and Harvard University in 1848.

== Career ==
Admitted to the New York bar in 1809, in January, 1810 Walworth moved to Plattsburgh, the Clinton County county seat and where his eldest brother Major John Walsworth served as clerk of the court. In 1811 Reuben Walworth was appointed a master of chancery, one of the local judges and whose particular responsibilities included overseeing and protecting widows and orphans, as well as issuing injunctions against nuisances.

During the War of 1812, Walworth served as adjutant-general of the New York militia, and as aide to General Benjamin Mooers. In September 1814, the British invaded Plattsburg, and from the shore of Lake Champlain, Walworth observed the naval victory of Commandant Thomas Macdonough in the Battle of Lake Champlain. He attained the rank of colonel and headed the division's judge advocate general corps by the war's end. His youngest brother Hiram Walworth (1799–1870) distinguished himself in the battle for the Saranac bridge in that war, and would later become a lawyer and serve for many years under their brother John in New York City. A midshipman in that battle, Charles Theodore Platt, would later become his brother-in-law. Their father also died in 1812, killed by one of his horses; his mother would survive another 25 years, cared for by family in upstate New York.

Voters elected Walworth as a Democratic-Republican to the 17th United States Congress. Serving alongside fellow Democratic-Republican Nathaniel Pitcher (a future New York governor) in what was then New York's 12th congressional district from December 3, 1821, to March 3, 1823, Walworth did not seek re-election in what became a one-representative district after census-based redistricting.

During his Congressional term, in April 1823, Walworth was appointed Judge of the New York Fourth Circuit Court. In October he moved to Saratoga Springs, Saratoga County, New York. Five years later, in 1828, Walworth was appointed Chancellor of New York, and continued to conduct court in his parlor. He remained in office until July 1847 when the State Constitution of 1846 abolished the office. Walworth wrote Rules and Orders of the New York Court of Chancery (Albany, 1829; several revised eds.), which greatly influenced equity practice in the United States.

Walworth gained President John Tyler's attention because of his widely respected opinions on evidence, pleadings, civil procedure, and arbitration. Tyler nominated him to the Supreme Court of the United States three times in 1844, but the nomination was always postponed due to Tyler's lack of support from both Whigs and the Democrats.

In 1848, Walworth was the Hunkers' candidate for Governor of New York, but was defeated in a three-way race by Whig Hamilton Fish.

In 1850, the United States Supreme Court appointed Walworth to serve as a commissioner (now special master) in litigation concerning the new Wheeling Suspension Bridge, the first bridge to cross a major river west of the Appalachian Mountains. The justices had divided during the previous years concerning the scope of the federal power in the Commerce Clause as well as concurrent state powers. In 1847, in U.S. v. New Bedford Bridge Company Justice Levi Woodbury on circuit duty had determined that no federal law defined obstruction of navigable waterways and upheld a drawbridge near the port, and Justice Samuel Nelson had done similarly while a justice of the New York Supreme Court. The Commonwealth of Pennsylvania (through its attorney general Cornelius Darragh) and Pittsburgh interests represented by Edwin M. Stanton and Robert J. Walker had brought this litigation in the United States Supreme Court by seeking an injunction against the bridge from the justice responsible for that geographic area, former Pennsylvania judge for the Pittsburgh area, Robert C. Grier. The Wheeling Bridge Company was represented by Charles W. Russell and U.S. Attorney general Reverdy Johnson (supposedly in a private capacity but who had denied Pennsylvania's request for his federal office's assistance)), among others. They argued the bridge helped the U.S. mails (delayed during ice and high and low water periods), connected military outposts, and that the public had a right to cross the river. Crucial to the equity required for the sought-after injunction, they argued, Pennsylvania had delayed two years while the bridge was under construction, as well as failed to prove irremediable injury (because technology also existed to lower steamboat smokestacks, as was necessary to use a downriver canal near Louisville, Kentucky. After Justice Grier held a hearing in Philadelphia on August 16, 1849, on August 30 he refused the requested injunction to remove the bridge. Instead, he referred the matter to the full court. That heard argument on February 25, 1850, reviewed extensive depositions (361 printed pages) and then on May 29, 1850, Justice Nelson (over a dissent by Justice Peter V. Daniel who would have refused jurisdiction altogether) issued a one-page order appointing Walworth as commissioner.

Walworth received much scientific and commercial evidence, including a report from U.S. Army engineer William Jarvis McAlpine. However, both parties were dissatisfied with Walworth's 770-page report, which he issued in December 1851. Pittsburgh was disappointed that Walworth refused to order the bridge removed. Virginia and Ohio interests complained because he found the waterway obstructed and recommended raising the bridge an additional 20 feet—which would cause enormous technical difficulties and additional cost. However, after reviewing both parties' exceptions, receiving another report from McAlpine and hearing more argument on February 23 and 24, the U.S. Supreme Court also refused to order the bridge removed, but instead amended the new required height to 111 feet. However, the bridge then disintegrated during a May 1854 windstorm and was rebuilt in eight weeks despite an injunction against such by Justice Grier (hence the 1856 litigation). Nonetheless, Walworth's report undergirded the Court's decisions in both 1852 as well as 1856 (the latter decision also relying on additional federal legislation). Completion of the B&O Railroad to Wheeling, and competition from a new steamboat line connection Wheeling with Louisville proved fatal to both steamboat companies, who soon dismantled their ships or sold them downriver for the Mississippi trade. Furthermore, additional bridges across the Ohio River were proposed for Parkersburg, Bellaire and Steubenville. A truss pivot drawbridge across the Mississippi River between Davenport, Iowa, and Rock Island, Illinois, was completed in 1856.

Returning to private legal practice, Walworth grew wealthy representing railroads in other litigation. He expanded the family mansion.

As the American Civil War neared, Walworth advocated peace and conciliation. A delegate at the Peace Conference of 1861 after the election of President Abraham Lincoln, his speech was published and circulated. As discussed below, his son Mansfield Tracy Walworth failed to receive a deferment from conscription during the American Civil War and was imprisoned for three month in 1864 as a suspected Confederate spy until released and restricted to the Saratoga Springs vicinity. However, his stepson Martin Davis Hardin (1837–1892), a West Point graduate, remained in the Union Army, distinguished himself in battle, and was promoted to General.

== Personal life ==
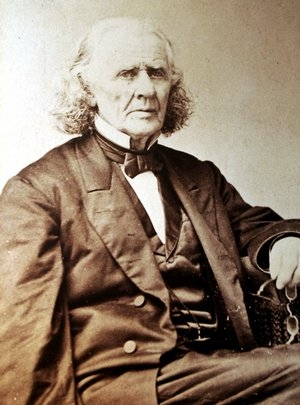
Walworth in his later years

Walworth married twice. On January 16, 1812, Reuben Walworth married Maria Ketchum Averill (1795–1847). They had four daughters and two sons. Both sons initially became lawyers and then writers, but also created widely different scandals of their era, as discussed below. After mourning Maria's death for four years, Walworth in Harrodsburg, Mercer County, Kentucky, in 1851 married Sarah Ellen (Smith) Hardin, widow of Congressman John J. Hardin (1810–1847) who had died in the Mexican American War and whose daughter Ellen Hardin was then 19. Walsworth's eldest son, Clarence A. Walworth (1820–1900) was admitted to the New York bar in 1841, and after studies at the General Theological Seminary in New York, converted from the Protestant Episcopal Church to Catholicism, a scandal in the era of the Know Nothing party. Rev. Walworth became a missionary within the United States, and his brother and wife were among those he converted to Catholicism. He also published books about his new faith as well as history (including his family), and became one of the five founders of the Paulist Fathers. His temperamental brother, Mansfield Tracy Walworth (1830–1873), after graduation from Harvard Law School became a novelist. In 1852 he married his stepsister, Ellen Hardin, and had eight children. Mansfield Walworth never completed the legal history his father wanted, but instead wrote lurid novels, and was ultimately disinherited by his father in favor of his wife/step-sister and progeny. During the American Civil War, he failed to receive a deferment from conscription, but secured a staff position in 1863, only to be imprisoned for three months in Capitol Prison as a suspected Confederate spy in 1864, before being released on orders of Gen. Fremont but restricted to the Saratoga Springs vicinity. To his father's dismay, Mansfield Walworth regularly abused his wife. In 1873 their son Francis Hardin "Frank" Walworth (1853–1883), invited his father to a New York City hotel room, then shot him four times, killing him. The trial caused a sensation, his lawyers arguing for acquittal by reason of insanity and the judge allowed Mansfield's abusive letters to his wife into evidence. Convicted of a lesser charge, his mother secured his release in 1877.

A devout Presbyterian, Walworth became an elder and known for charity toward the poor. A Freemason, he rose to Grand Master in the Grand Lodge of New York in 1853. He was also vice-president of the Bible Society and the Tract Society, and for a long period president of the American Temperance Union. Walworth also wrote Hyde Genealogy (2 vols., 1864), and was elected a member of the American Antiquarian Society in 1865.

== Death and legacy ==
Walworth died in Saratoga Springs on November 28, 1867.

Walworth County, Wisconsin, and Walworth, New York, were named for him. His stepdaughter inherited the family mansion, Pine Grove, which the Chancellor had expanded to 55 rooms (including a courtroom). It survived a century, but was torn down after his granddaughter died, Saratoga Springs having become a racing and gambling center. Several rooms are recreated in the Saratoga Springs History Museum.

== See also ==
- Frances Fuller Victor, pioneering historian of the Pacific Northwest, was a "close relative" of Walworth.

== Sources ==
- Political Graveyard
- Sullivan, James; Williams, Melvin E.; Conklin, Edwin P.; Fitzpatrick, Benedict, eds. (1927), History of New York State, 1523–1927 (PDF), vol. 5, New York City, Chicago: Lewis Historical Publishing Co., p. 1995, hdl:2027/mdp.39015028558818, Wikidata Q114149630, "Had the chancellorship been a desirable judicial office Walworth probably would never have been appointed. "It is said that the office was offered to all the judges of the Supreme Court and declined by them before it was offered to Mr. Walworth." He was himself taken aback; at least so one would infer from his address to the bar soon after taking office. With Democratic simplicity or frank humility, he said: "Brought up a farmer till the age of seventeen, deprived of all advantages of a classical education, and with very limited knowledge of chancery law, I find myself, at the age of thirty-eight, suddenly and unexpectedly placed at the head of the justices of the State, a situation which has heretofore been filled by the most able and experienced member of the profession.""
- The New York Civil List compiled by Franklin Benjamin Hough (pages 71, 353, 356; Weed, Parsons and Co., 1858)
- Hyde Genealogy by Reuben Hyde Walworth (published by Joel Munsell, Albany, 1863; pages 533ff)

U.S. House of Representatives
Preceded by Ezra C. Gross; Nathaniel Pitcher	Member of the U.S. House of Representatives from New York's 12th congressional district 1821–1823; Served alongside: Nathaniel Pitcher	Succeeded by Lewis Eaton
Legal offices
New seat	Judge of the New York Fourth Circuit Court; 1823–1828	Succeeded by Esek Cowen
Preceded by Samuel Jones	Chancellor of New York; 1828–1847	Succeeded by Freeborn G. Jewett as Chief Judge of the New York Court of Appeals
Party political offices
Preceded by Silas Wright	Democratic nominee for Governor of New York; 1848	Succeeded by Horatio Seymour
