= Thomas Ripley =

Thomas Ripley may refer to:

- Thomas Ripley (architect) (1683–1758), English architect
- Thomas C. Ripley (1807–1897), United States Representative from New York
- Tom Ripley, a fictional character in the series of crime novels by Patricia Highsmith
- Thomas Ripley (1791–1852), English merchant, in whose memory Ripley St Thomas Church of England Academy's predecessor institution was founded
