= Nathaniel Pitcher =

Governor of New York in 1828

8th Governor of New York
- In office February 11, 1828 – December 31, 1828
- Lieutenant: Peter R. Livingston; Charles Dayan
- Preceded by: DeWitt Clinton
- Succeeded by: Martin Van Buren

Lieutenant Governor of New York
- In office January 11, 1827 – February 10, 1828
- Governor: DeWitt Clinton
- Preceded by: James Tallmadge Jr.
- Succeeded by: Peter R. Livingston (acting)

Member of the U.S. House of Representatives from New York
- In office March 4, 1831 – March 3, 1833
- Preceded by: Henry C. Martindale
- Succeeded by: Daniel Wardwell
- Constituency: 18th district
- In office March 4, 1819 – March 3, 1823
- Preceded by: John Savage
- Succeeded by: Lewis Eaton
- Constituency: 12th district

Member of the New York State Assembly from Washington and Warren Counties
- In office 1816–1818 Serving with William Cook, John Gale, Isaac Sargent, David Woods
- Preceded by: Michael Harris, John Reid, David Abel Russell, James Stevenson, Roswell Weston
- Succeeded by: Duncan Cameron, Jason Kellogg, Alexander Livingston, John McLean Jr., Isaac Sargent
- In office 1815–1816 Serving with John Gale, Henry Mattison, John Richards, Isaac Sargent
- Preceded by: Paul Dennis, Samuel Gordon, John Richards, John Savage, Charles Starbuck, John White
- Succeeded by: Michael Harris, John Reid, David Abel Russell, James Stevenson, Roswell Weston
- In office 1806–1807 Serving with Kitchel Bishop, William Livingston, John McLean, Daniel Shepherd, one vacancy
- Preceded by: Isaac Harlow, Jason Kellogg, William Livingston, John McLean, Solomon Smith, James Starbuck
- Succeeded by: Kitchel Bishop, Peleg Bragg, John Gray, James Hill, Jason Kellogg, William Robards

Town Supervisor of Kingsbury, New York
- In office 1804–1810
- Preceded by: Thomas Bradshaw
- Succeeded by: Felix Alden

Personal details
- Born: November 30, 1777 Litchfield, Connecticut, US
- Died: May 25, 1836 (aged 58) Sandy Hill, New York, US
- Resting place: Baker Cemetery in Hudson Falls
- Party: Democratic-Republican
- Spouse(s): Margaret Scott (1782–1815); Anna B. Merritt (1791–1824)
- Relations: Zina Pitcher (half-brother)
- Children: 4
- Profession: Attorney

Military service
- Allegiance: United States; New York
- Branch/service: (New York (state)) New York State Militia
- Years of service: 1802–
- Rank: Brigadier General
- Commands: 17th Brigade
- Battles/wars: War of 1812

Nathaniel Pitcher (November 30, 1777 – May 25, 1836) was an American lawyer and politician who served in Congress and as the eighth governor of New York from February 11 to December 31, 1828.

Pitcher was born in Litchfield, Connecticut, and raised in Sandy Hill, New York (Hudson Falls). He was educated in Sandy Hill, studied law, was admitted to the bar, and became an attorney. He became active in politics as a Democratic-Republican, and served in local offices including town supervisor and justice of the peace. He served in the New York State Assembly, as probate court judge of Washington County, and as a federal tax assessor during the War of 1812. He was also a longtime veteran of the New York Militia; he served during the War of 1812, and after the war he commanded a brigade with the rank of brigadier general.

Pitcher served in the United States House of Representatives from 1819 to 1823. He became lieutenant governor in 1827, and he succeeded to the governorship in 1828, following the death of DeWitt Clinton. He was succeeded as governor by Martin Van Buren. Pitcher served another term in the U.S. House from 1831 to 1833. He died in Sandy Hill on May 25, 1836 and was buried at Baker Cemetery in Hudson Falls.

== Early life ==
Pitcher was born in Litchfield on November 30, 1777. He was the son of Nathaniel Pitcher Sr. (1750–1802), a veteran of the American Revolution who led the detachment that captured Lake George's Fort George from the British in 1775. The younger Pitcher was raised and educated in Sandy Hill, New York (now Hudson Falls). He studied law, was admitted to the bar, and practiced in Sandy Hill.

== Early career ==
Pitcher entered politics as a member of the Democratic-Republican Party, and he served as Kingsbury's town supervisor from 1804 to 1810. He was a member of the New York State Assembly from 1806 to 1807, 1815 to 1816, and 1816 to 1818.

From 1812 to 1813, Pitcher served as surrogate judge of Washington County. He was Kingsbury's town clerk in 1813 and 1814, and also served as a justice of the peace, with appointments in 1804, 1806, 1807, 1808, and 1811. During the War of 1812, Pitcher was appointed the federal revenue assessor for the 10th District of New York, which included Washington County, and was responsible for collecting taxes imposed to support the war effort.

== Military career ==
Pitcher's father had been active in the militia, and the younger Nathaniel Pitcher followed him into military service, receiving his commission as an ensign in 1802. In 1808 he was appointed as adjutant of the regiment commanded by Micajah Pettit. Later in 1808 he was promoted to major, and appointed as inspector of the brigade commanded by Warren Ferris. In 1814, Pitcher was included in a militia detail of 13,500 soldiers that was activated for federal service during military operations on the Canada-western New York border during the War of 1812.

In 1815, Pitcher was appointed lieutenant colonel and second in command of the militia's 121st Regiment. Later in 1815, he succeeded Pettit as commander of the 17th Brigade, and was promoted to brigadier general. As a result of his military service, Pitcher was frequently referred to in public records and newspaper stories as "General Pitcher" or "Gen. Pitcher".

== Later career ==
He was elected as a Democratic-Republican to the 16th and 17th Congresses (March 4, 1819 – March 3, 1823). He was a delegate to the New York State Constitutional Convention in 1821.

Pitcher was Lieutenant Governor of New York in 1827 and 1828 and became Governor of New York upon the death of Governor DeWitt Clinton. He completed Clinton's term, February 11, 1828, to December 31, 1828, and was succeeded by Martin Van Buren.

He was again elected as a Jacksonian to the 22nd Congress (March 4, 1831 – March 3, 1833).

== Death and burial ==
Pitcher died in Hudson Falls on May 25, 1836, and was buried at Baker Cemetery in Hudson Falls.

== Family ==
Pitcher's first wife was Margaret Scott (1782–1815). Their children included sons Augustus (1808–1876), Matthew Scott (1810–1858), and Montgomery Pike (1813–1841).

On March 15, 1823, Pitcher was married to Anna B. Merritt (1791–1824) of Freedom Plains, New York. She became ill and died soon after giving birth to their son Edward Merritt (1824–1860). Edward Merritt Pitcher moved to California in the 1840s, where he was an early settler of Sacramento, and a member of Sacramento County's first board of supervisors.

Pitcher's siblings included Zina Pitcher, a prominent physician and mayor of Detroit.

== Legacy ==
The town of Pitcher in Chenango County is named for Pitcher.

== Attempts to locate portrait ==
Pitcher is the only Governor of New York for whom no likeness is known to exist, and attempts to locate one have proved unsuccessful. One image that is sometimes identified as a portrait of Pitcher is not his likeness, as the clothing worn by the subject and the facial hair clearly date it to the 1850s–1860s era, at least 20 years after Pitcher died.

== Sources ==
=== Books ===
- Auburn Free Press (1830). Proceedings of the Workingmen's State Convention in the Town of Salina. Auburn, NY: Henry Oliphant.
- Fox, Dixon Ryan (1919). The Decline of Aristocracy in the Politics of New York. New York, NY: Columbia University. ISBN 9780231932905.
- Greenlee, Ralph Stebbins; Greenlee, Robert Lemuel (1904). The Stebbins Genealogy. Vol. I. Chicago, IL: M. A. Donohue and Company.
- Guernsey, Rocellus Sheridan (1895). New York City and Vicinity During the War of 1812–15. Vol. II. New York, NY: Charles R. Woodward.
- Hastings, Hugh; Noble, Henry Harmon (1901). Military Minutes of the Council of Appointment of the State of New York. Vol. I. Albany, NY: James B. Lyon.
- Loding, Paul R. (2001). Images of America: Kingsbury and Hudson Falls. Charleston, SC: Arcadia Publishing. ISBN 978-0-7385-0534-3.
- Johnson, Crisfield (1878). History of Washington Co., New York. Philadelphia, PA: J. B. Lippincott & Co.
- Moyer, Armond; Moyer, Winifred (1958). The Origins of Unusual Place-Names. Keystone Pub. Associates.
- New York State Senate (1902). Documents of the Senate of the State of New York. Vol. X. Albany, NY: J. B. Lyon Company.
- United States Congress (2005). Biographical Directory of the United States Congress, 1774–2005. Washington, DC: U.S. Government Printing Office. ISBN 978-0-16-073176-1.
- United States Department of State (1816). A Register of Officers and Agents, Civil, Military, and Naval in the Service of the United States. Washington, DC: Jonathan Elliot.
- White, James T. (1904). National Cyclopedia of American Biography. Vol. XII. New York, NY: James T. White & Company.

=== Newspapers ===
- "Marriage Notice: Nathaniel Pitcher and Anna B. Merritt". Albany Argus. Albany, NY. April 1, 1823 – via GenealogyBank.com.
- "Death Notice, Anna B. Pitcher". Albany Argus. Albany, NY. May 7, 1824 – via GenealogyBank.com.
- "On the first instant the oaths were administered to Martin Van Buren, Governor, and Enos T. Throop, Lieut. Governor". Poughkeepsie Journal. Poughkeepsie, NY. January 7, 1829 – via Newspapers.com.
- "Death Notice, Edward M. Pitcher". San Francisco Bulletin. San Francisco, CA. April 24, 1860 – via GenealogyBank.com.
- "Death Notice, Augustus Pitcher". Galveston Daily News. Galveston, TX. February 18, 1876 – via NewspaperARCHIVE.com.
- "Fail to Uncover Likeness of Hudson Falls Man Who Served As Governor". Glens Falls Times. Glens Falls, NY. Associated Press. November 30, 1968 – via Newspapers.com.
- Howard, Brian J. (January 5, 2009). "Pataki Portrait Easy, Artist Says". The Journal News. White Plains, NY – via Newspapers.com.
- Rubio, J’aime (August 10, 2015). "Looking Back: Roseville's first Postmistress was a trail blazer: Charlotte 'Lottie' Pitcher did it all during Roseville's Victorian era". Roseville & Granite Bay Press Tribune. Roseville, CA.

=== Magazines ===
- Bascom, Robert O.; Holden, James Austin (1910). "The Ticonderoga Expedition of 1775: Capture of Fort George by Col. Romans". Proceedings of the New York State Historical Association. Vol. 9. Albany, NY: New York State Historical Association.

=== Internet ===
- Pfeffer, Vicki (August 27, 2006). "Cemetery Records Kingsbury, New York: Baker Cemetery". Genealogy.com. Provo, UT: Ancestry.com, LLC.
- California State Library (April 1, 1972). "California Pioneer and Immigrant Files, 1790–1950, Entry for Edward Merritt Pitcher". Ancestry.com. Provo, UT: Ancestry.com, LLC.

U.S. House of Representatives
Preceded by John Savage, John Palmer	Member of the U.S. House of Representatives from New York's 12th congressional district 1819–1823 with Ezra C. Gross 1819–21 and Reuben H. Walworth 1821–23	Succeeded by Lewis Eaton
Preceded by Henry C. Martindale	Member of the U.S. House of Representatives from New York's 18th congressional district 1831–1833	Succeeded by Daniel Wardwell
Political offices
Preceded by James Tallmadge, Jr.	Lieutenant Governor of New York; 1827–1828	Succeeded by Peter R. Livingston; Acting
Preceded by DeWitt Clinton	Governor of New York; 1828	Succeeded by Martin Van Buren
