= Ezra C. Gross =

American politician

Ezra Carter Gross

Member of the U.S. House of Representatives from New York's 12th district
- In office March 4, 1819, – March 3, 1821
- Preceded by: John Palmer; John Savage
- Succeeded by: Nathaniel Pitcher; Reuben H. Walworth

Personal details
- Born: July 11, 1787
- Died: April 9, 1829 (aged 41) Albany, New York, U.S.

Ezra Carter Gross (July 11, 1787 Hartford, Windsor County, Vermont – April 9, 1829 Albany, New York) was an American lawyer and politician from New York.

== Life ==
He graduated from the University of Vermont in 1806. Then he studied law, was admitted to the bar in 1810, and practiced first in Elizabethtown and later in Keeseville, both in Essex County, New York. He was appointed a Master in Chancery in 1812.

He served in the War of 1812, and held a commission in the New York Militia from 1814 to 1821. He was Surrogate of Essex County from 1815 to 1819. He was Town Supervisor of Elizabethtown in 1818, 1823 and 1824.

Gross was elected as a Democratic-Republican to the 16th United States Congress, holding office from March 4, 1819, to March 3, 1821. Afterwards he resumed the practice of law.

He was a member from Essex Co. of the New York State Assembly in 1828 and 1829, and died during the legislative session in Albany on April 9, 1829. He was buried at the Evergreen Cemetery in Keeseville.

U.S. House of Representatives
Preceded by John Palmer, John Savage	Member of the U.S. House of Representatives from New York's 12th congressional district 1819–1821 with Nathaniel Pitcher	Succeeded by Nathaniel Pitcher, Reuben H. Walworth
