= Bernard Blair =

American politician

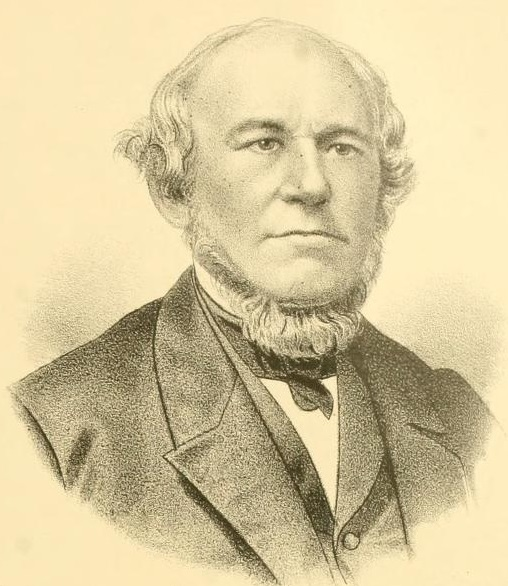

Member of the U.S. House of Representatives from New York's 12th district
- In office March 4, 1841 – March 3, 1843
- Preceded by: David A. Russell
- Succeeded by: David L. Seymour

Personal details
- Born: May 24, 1801 Williamstown, Massachusetts, US
- Died: May 7, 1880 (aged 78) Salem, New York, US
- Party: Whig Party
- Spouse: Charlotte Lansing Blair
- Education: Williams College
- Profession: Attorney; banker; politician

Bernard Blair (May 24, 1801 – May 7, 1880) was an American politician and a U.S. Representative from New York.

== Biography ==
Born in Williamstown, Massachusetts, Blair was the son of William and Sally (Train) Blair. He attended the public schools and pursued preparatory studies. He was graduated from Williams College, Williamstown, Massachusetts, in 1825. He married Charlotte Lansing.

== Career ==
Blair moved to Salem, Washington County, New York, in 1825. He studied law, was admitted to the bar in 1828 and commenced practice in Salem, subsequently being admitted as counselor and solicitor in chancery. He was a delegate to Whig National Convention from New York, 1839.

Elected as a Whig to the Twenty-seventh Congress, Blair was United States Representative for the twelfth district of New York and served from March 4, 1841, to March 3, 1843. After his term in Congress, he discontinued the practice of his profession and engaged in business pursuits.

== Death ==
Blair died in Salem, Washington County, New York, on May 7, 1880.

U.S. House of Representatives
Preceded by David A. Russell	Representative of the 12th Congressional District of New York; March 4, 1841 – March 3, 1843	Succeeded by David L. Seymour
