= Breese-Reynolds House =

Historic house in New York, United States

- U.S. National Register of Historic Places
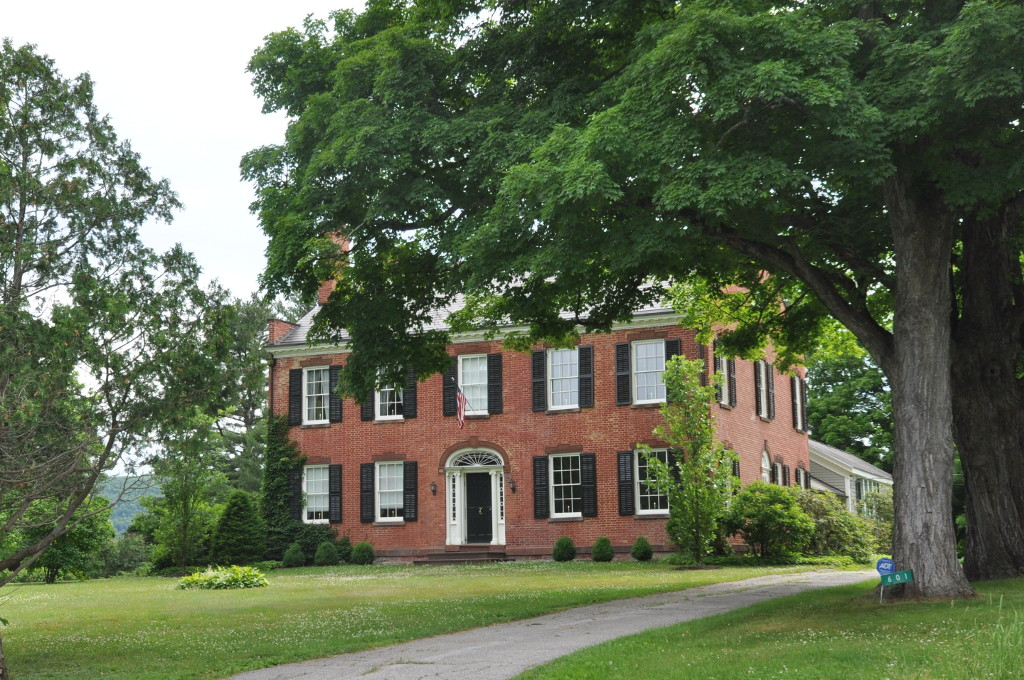

- Location within New York Location within the United States
- Location: 601 South St., Hoosick, New York
- Coordinates: 42°51′28.911″N 73°19′27.3684″W
- Area: 8 acres (3.2 ha)
- Built: 1825
- Architectural style: Federal, Greek Revival
- NRHP reference No.: 07000096
- Added to NRHP: March 1, 2007

The Breese-Reynolds House is a historic house located at 601 South Street in Hoosick, Rensselaer County, New York.

== Description and history ==
The house was built in about 1825 and consists of a 2 1/2-story, five-by-three-bay, gable-roofed brick main block with a rectangular, 1 1/2-story wood-framed wing. The wing was added in the mid-19th century. The main block has a slate roof. It is an example of a transitional Federal/Greek Revival–style dwelling.

It was listed on the National Register of Historic Places on March 1, 2007.
