= David L. Seymour =

American politician (1803–1867)

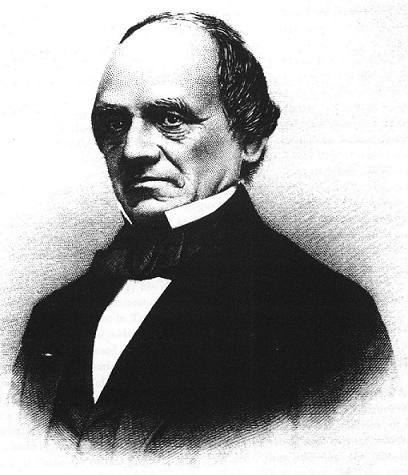

Member of the U.S. House of Representatives from New York's 12th district
- In office March 4, 1851 – March 3, 1853
- Preceded by: Gideon Reynolds
- Succeeded by: Gilbert Dean
- In office March 4, 1843 – March 3, 1845
- Preceded by: Bernard Blair
- Succeeded by: Richard P. Herrick

Member of the New York State Assembly
- In office January 1, 1836 – December 31, 1836

Personal details
- Born: David Lowrey Seymour; December 2, 1803 Wethersfield, Connecticut, U.S.
- Died: October 11, 1867 (aged 63) Lanesborough, Massachusetts, U.S.
- Resting place: Mount Ida Cemetery, Troy, New York, U.S.
- Party: Democratic
- Relatives: Charles E. Patterson (son-in-law)
- Education: Yale College
- Profession: Politician, lawyer

David Lowrey Seymour (December 2, 1803, Wethersfield, Connecticut – October 11, 1867, Lanesborough, Massachusetts) was an American lawyer and politician from New York. From 1843 to 1845, he served one term in the U.S. House of Representatives, then served a second, non-consecutive term from 1851 to 1853.

== Life ==
He graduated from Yale College in 1826, and was a tutor at Yale College from 1828 to 1830. Then he studied law, was admitted to the bar in 1829, and commenced practice in Troy, New York.

=== Political career ===
He was a member of the New York State Assembly in 1836.

He was District Attorney of Rensselaer County from 1839 to 1842.

==== Congress ====
Seymour was elected as a Democrat to the 28th United States Congress, holding office from March 4, 1843, to March 3, 1845, and was Chairman of the Committee on Revolutionary Pensions.

Seymour was elected to the 32nd United States Congress, holding office from March 4, 1851, to March 3, 1853, and was Chairman of the Committee on Commerce. Afterwards, he resumed the practice of law.

He was a delegate to the New York State Constitutional Convention of 1867.

=== Death and burial ===
He died on October 11, 1868, and was buried at Mount Ida Cemetery in Troy.

=== Family ===
His law partner and son-in-law Charles E. Patterson was Speaker of the New York State Assembly in 1882.

== Sources ==
- United States Congress. "David L. Seymour (id: S000265)". Biographical Directory of the United States Congress.

U.S. House of Representatives
Preceded by Bernard Blair	Member of the U.S. House of Representatives from New York's 12th congressional district 1843–1845	Succeeded by Richard P. Herrick
Preceded by Gideon Reynolds	Member of the U.S. House of Representatives from New York's 12th congressional district 1851–1853	Succeeded by Gilbert Dean
