= Waldo Hutchins =

American politician (1822–1891)

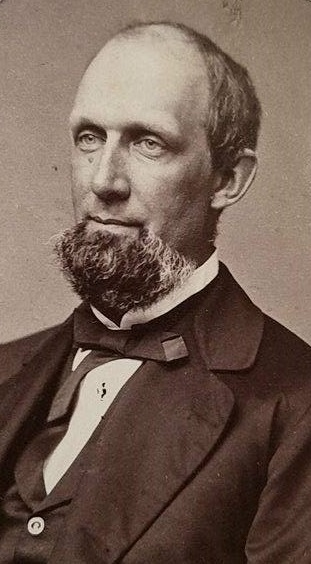
- Photographs of the Officers and Members of the Constitutional Convention of the State of New York, 1867.

Member of the U.S. House of Representatives from New York's 12th district
- In office November 4, 1879 – March 3, 1885
- Preceded by: Clarkson Nott Potter
- Succeeded by: Abraham Dowdney

Personal details
- Born: September 30, 1822 Brooklyn, Connecticut, U.S.
- Died: February 8, 1891 (aged 68) New York City, New York, U.S.
- Resting place: Woodlawn Cemetery
- Party: Democratic

Waldo Hutchins (September 30, 1822 – February 8, 1891) was a New York attorney, businessman and politician. He served in the New York State Assembly and as a Member of Congress for three terms from 1879 to 1885.

== Biography ==
Born in Brooklyn, Connecticut, Hutchins graduated from Amherst College in 1842. He studied law, was admitted to the bar in 1845 and commenced practice in New York City.

=== Early political career ===
He served as a member of the New York State Assembly in 1852. From 1857 to 1869 Hutchins was a member of the Central Park board of commissioners. He was a delegate to the State constitutional convention in 1867.

=== Congress ===
Hutchins was elected as a Democrat to the Forty-sixth Congress to fill the vacancy caused by the death of Alexander Smith. He was reelected to the Forty-seventh and Forty-eighth Congresses and served from November 4, 1879 to March 3, 1885. He was not a candidate for renomination in 1884 and resumed the practice of law in New York City.

=== Later career and death ===
In 1887, Hutchins was again appointed to New York City's Central Park Commission. He served until his death in New York City on February 8, 1891. He was interred at Woodlawn Cemetery in the Bronx.

=== Legacy ===
In New York City's Central Park, overlooking Conservatory Water, is the Waldo Hutchins bench, a curved Concord white granite exedra outdoor bench. The bench is almost 4 feet (1.2 m) tall by 27 feet (8.2 m) long, and weighs several tons. The cost of the bench was $15,000 ($350,000 in current dollar terms). Its architect was Eric Gugler, and in 1932 it was executed by the Piccirilli Brothers studio, the firm that carved the Lincoln Memorial in Washington, D.C.

== Family ==
Hutchins was married to Elizabeth Ellsworth, the daughter of William Wolcott Ellsworth and granddaughter of Oliver Ellsworth. They were the parents of four children—Julia Sterling (1855-1930), Augustus Schell (1856-1948), Waldo (1858-1933), and William Ellsworth (1861-1916).

== Sources ==
=== Books ===
- Grant, Robert (1891). Annual Report: Including Proceedings of the Annual Meeting of the American Bar Association. Vol. 14. Philadelphia, PA: Cando Printing and Publishing. pp. 438–439.
- Chapin, Gilbert Warren (1924). The Chapin Book of Genealogical Data. Vol. II. Hartford, CT: Chapin family Association. p. 1669.

=== Internet ===
- "Waldo Hutchins Bench". Central Park Attractions. New York, NY: Central Park Conservancy.

=== Newspapers ===
- "Waldo Hutchins, Democrat, was elected on Tuesday in the Westchester district of New York". Indiana Democrat. Indiana, PA. November 13, 1879. p. 6.
- "Waldo Hutchins' Funeral". Brooklyn Daily Eagle. Brooklyn, NY. February 10, 1891. p. 6.

=== Magazines ===
- Cushing, H. A. (February 14, 1891). "Alumni Notes: Waldo Hutchins". Amherst Student. Amherst, MA: Carpenter & Morehouse. p. 136.

== External sources ==
- United States Congress. "Waldo Hutchins (id: H001009)". Biographical Directory of the United States Congress.
- Waldo Hutchins at Find a Grave

New York State Assembly
Preceded by Howard C. Cady	New York State Assembly; Kings County, 2nd District; 1852	Succeeded by George A. Searing
U.S. House of Representatives
Preceded by Clarkson Nott Potter	Member of the U.S. House of Representatives from New York's 12th congressional district November 4, 1879 – March 3, 1885	Succeeded by Abraham Dowdney
