= William A. Russell (New York politician) =

American politician

New York State Prison Inspector
- In office January 1, 1856 – December 31, 1858

Sheriff of Washington County, New York
- In office 1850–1852

Personal details
- Party: American
- Parent: David Abel Russell (father)
- Relatives: David Allen Russell (brother)
- Occupation: Politician

William A. Russell (after 1820 – before 1897) was an American politician from New York.

He was the son of Congressman David Abel Russell and Alida (Lansing) Russell.

He was Sheriff of Washington County from 1850 to 1852.

He was an Inspector of State Prisons from 1856 to 1858, elected on the American ticket in 1855 but defeated for re-election in 1858.

Union General David Allen Russell was his brother.

== Sources ==
- DEATH LIST OF A DAY in NYT on May 25, 1897, his son's (also named William A. Russell) obit
- Harper's Magazine telling an anecdote of Russell's trip south to take up his duties at the State Prison
- The New York Civil List compiled by Franklin Benjamin Hough (pages 46 and 409; Weed, Parsons and Co., 1858)
