= Henry C. Martindale =

American politician (1780–1860)

Henry Clinton Martindale

Member of the U.S. House of Representatives from New York
- In office March 4, 1823 – March 3, 1831
- Preceded by: Micah Sterling
- Succeeded by: Nathaniel Pitcher
- Constituency: 18th district
- In office March 4, 1833 – March 3, 1835
- Preceded by: Joseph Bouck
- Succeeded by: David Abel Russell
- Constituency: 12th district

Personal details
- Born: May 6, 1780 Berkshire County, Massachusetts, U.S.
- Died: April 22, 1860 (aged 79) Hudson Falls, New York, U.S.
- Resting place: Kingsbury Cemetery, Kingsbury, New York, U.S.
- Party: Federalist; National Republican; Anti-Masonic
- Children: John H. Martindale
- Education: Williams College

Henry Clinton Martindale (May 6, 1780 in Berkshire County, Massachusetts – April 22, 1860 in Sandy Hill, Washington County, New York) was an American lawyer and politician from New York.

== Life ==
He graduated from Williams College in 1800. Then he studied law, was admitted to the bar, and practiced at Sandy Hill (now Hudson Falls) from 1801 to 1860. His law office is located in the Hudson Falls Historic District, added to the National Register of Historic Places in 1983.

Among the prospective attorneys who studied law under Martindale's tutelage was Silas Wright. Martindale was Surrogate of Washington County from 1816 to 1819, and District Attorney from 1821 to 1828.

Martindale was elected as an Adams-Clay Federalist to the 18th, re-elected as an Adams man to the 19th and 20th, as an Anti-Jacksonian to the 21st, and as an Anti-Mason to the 23rd United States Congress, holding office from March 4, 1823, to March 3, 1831, and from March 4, 1833, to March 3, 1835.

He was appointed by Governor William H. Seward as a canal appraiser, holding this post from 1840 to 1843.

He was buried at the Kingsbury Cemetery in Kingsbury, New York.

His son John H. Martindale was a Union Army general and New York State Attorney General.

== Sources ==
- United States Congress. "Henry C. Martindale (id: M000204)". Biographical Directory of the United States Congress.
- The New York Civil List compiled by Franklin Benjamin Hough (pages 43, 71f, 384 and 419; Weed, Parsons and Co., 1858)

U.S. House of Representatives
Preceded by Micah Sterling	Member of the U.S. House of Representatives from New York's 18th congressional district 1823–1831	Succeeded by Nathaniel Pitcher
Preceded by Joseph Bouck	Member of the U.S. House of Representatives from New York's 12th congressional district 1833–1835	Succeeded by David Abel Russell
