= 1858 New York state election =

- November 2, 1858

The 1858 New York state election was held on November 2, 1858, to elect the governor, the lieutenant governor, a Canal Commissioner, and an Inspector of State Prisons, as well as all members of the New York State Assembly and two members of the New York State Senate. Besides, the question was asked if a Constitutional Convention should be held, and answered in the negative: The vote was 135,266 for and 144,526 against.

== History ==
The "Mass State Convention to nominate Gerrit Smith for Governor" met on August 4 at Syracuse, New York, Isaac Parks, of Canastota, presided.

The Republican and the American state conventions met on September 8 at Syracuse, New York. At the Republican convention, Thurlow Weed was a delegate to a state convention for the first time after twenty years. There was some debate about the nomination of a joint ticket with the Americans. Ezra Graves was temporary chairman until the choice of Daniel T. Jones as president. A motion to nominate candidates for governor was voted down by 166 to 67, and the convention adjourned. At the American convention, Daniel Ullmann was chosen President, and after much debate they adjourned too. The Republican convention re-assembled on September 9, and Edwin D. Morgan was nominated for governor on the second ballot (first ballot: Morgan 116, Timothy Jenkins 51, James M. Cook 35, George W. Patterson 23, A. S. Diven 21, John Alsop King 4, Horace Greeley 3; second ballot: Morgan 165, Jenkins 52, Patterson 20, Diven 18). Between the two ballots an American delegation arrived. Robert Campbell was nominated for lieutenant governor by acclamation. Now the American delegation marched back to the American convention with a Republican delegation which announced the Republican nominations and offered the Americans to complete the joint ticket with the nominees for Canal Commissioner and Prison Inspector. The Americans decided against it and nominated Lorenzo Burrows for governor, and Nathaniel S. Benton for lieutenant governor by acclamation. James R. Thompson was nominated for Canal Commissioner on the first ballot (vote: Thompson 84, Jesse C. Dann 64, Benoni Thompson 15, Justus Deming 4, scattering 4). The incumbent William A. Russell was re-nominated for Prison Inspector on the first ballot.

== Result ==
The whole Republican ticket was elected. The incumbent Russell was defeated.

One Republican and one American were elected for the session of 1859 to the New York State Senate, which had then 16 Republicans, 12 Democrats, 3 Americans and one Independent Republican.

99 Republicans and Americans, and 29 Democrats were elected for the session of 1859 to the New York State Assembly.

1858 state election results
Office	Republican ticket		Democratic ticket		American ticket		People's ticket (Note: The Radical Abolitionist Party fused with other reform groups to nominate Smith on the "People's State Ticket.")	
Governor	Edwin D. Morgan	247,953	Amasa J. Parker	230,513	Lorenzo Burrows	60,880	Gerrit Smith	5,470
Lieutenant Governor	Robert Campbell	250,831	John J. Taylor	229,796	Nathaniel S. Benton	62,336	Sidney A. Beers	2,187
Canal Commissioner	Hiram Gardner	249,933	Sherburne B. Piper	229,848	James R. Thompson	59,919	J. C. Harrington	1,801
Inspector of State Prisons	Josiah T. Everest	248,151	Edward L. Donnelly	226,992	William A. Russell	60,409	Silas T. Tyler	1,690

== See also ==
- New York gubernatorial elections

== Sources ==
- Result in The Tribune Almanac 1859
