= Josiah T. Everest =

American politician (1800–1873)

New York State Prison Inspector
- In office January 1, 1859 – December 31, 1861

Member of the New York State Assembly from the Clinton district
- In office January 1, 1855 – December 31, 1855

Personal details
- Born: Josiah Terry Everest; October 5, 1800 Addison, Vermont, U.S.
- Died: September 1, 1873 (aged 72)
- Party: Republican
- Other political affiliations: Whig
- Spouse: Sarah Sibley (m. 1821)
- Children: 11
- Occupation: Politician, lawyer

Josiah Terry Everest (October 5, 1800, in Addison, Vermont – September 1, 1873) was an American lawyer and politician active in New York. He served on the New York State Assembly as the representative for Clinton County.

== Life ==
He was the son of Joseph Everest (1754–1825) and Sarah (Eells) Everest (1755–1835). The family removed to Peru, New York in 1801. On June 3, 1821, he married Sarah ("Sallie") Sibley (1806–1883), and they had eleven children.

He was a Judge of the Clinton County Court in 1845.

He was a Whig member of the New York State Assembly (Clinton Co.) in 1855.

He was an Inspector of State Prisons from 1859 to 1861, elected on the Republican ticket in 1858.

== Sources ==
- The New York Civil List compiled by Franklin Benjamin Hough, Stephen C. Hutchins and Edgar Albert Werner (1867; pages 411 and 479)
- STATE NOMINATIONS in NYT on November 6, 1854
- Everest genealogy, at RootsWeb
