= Joshua Furnas =

American football player (born 1984)

No. 2
- Position: Wide receiver

Personal information
- Born: December 16, 1984 (age 41); Elmira, New York, U.S.
- Listed height: 6 ft 1 in (1.85 m)
- Listed weight: 200 lb (91 kg)

Career information
- College: Albany (2003–2006)

Joshua Furnas (born December 16, 1984) is an American former football player, social advocate, and co-founder of Selfless Tee.

== Early life ==
Furnas was born in Elmira, New York and attended high school at Elmira Free Academy. Furnas was a three-year starter on both the varsity football and baseball teams. In 2003, Furnas was also awarded "Twin Tiers Defensive Player of the year" by the Elmira Star-Gazette. Furnas was also a co-recipient of EFA's Male Athlete of the Year award.

== College career ==
Furnas played four seasons at University at Albany, SUNY. He missed the entire 2003 and 2004 seasons due to injury; he was granted a medical red shirt his first year. In 2005, Josh hauled in seven catches for 101 yards. In 2006, Josh's final season, he caught seven passes for 90 yards and one touchdown. Josh's lone touchdown was against the then nationally ranked University of Delaware Blue Hens.

== After college ==
In 2007, Furnas graduated from Albany with a degree in business. Furnas spent the next few years as general manager of the Big Moose Deli & Country Store in Hoosick, New York. Furnas, along with former Albany teammate Danny Bocanegra, co-founded Selfless Tee. Selfless Tee is a for-profit organization geared toward making "fashionable clothing with a social conscience."

In March 2010, Selfless Tee was awarded a $50,000 Pepsi Refresh Project.

In January 2013, Furnas was featured in a San Francisco Chronicle news article about young entrepreneurs living in pop-up rentals. Furnas pays to rent a living room closet in a Bayview house of an Ecuadorian family of 7.

== Misophonia ==
Furnas is a sufferer and well known awareness advocate of 'Hatred of Sound' Disorder, Misophonia. On May 18, 2012 Furnas was featured on ABC's news magazine television show, 20/20, openly speaking about his battle with misophonia.

== TEDx ==
In 2012, Furnas began participating in independently organized TEDx events promoting his ideas for social innovation.

On November 10, 2012, Furnas was featured at TEDx Chemung River in New York. The topic which Furnas spoke of was "The Art of the Tee: Fashioning a Better World".
