= Alexander Smith (American politician) =

American politician

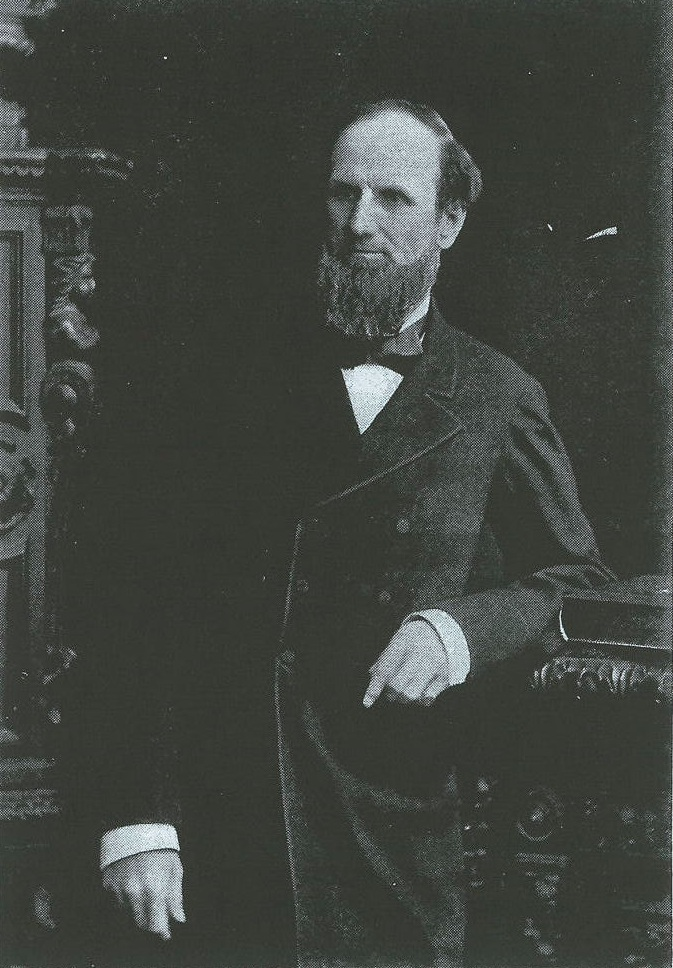

Member-elect of the U.S. House of Representatives from New York's 12th district
- Died before taking office
- Preceded by: Clarkson Potter
- Succeeded by: Waldo Hutchins

Personal details
- Born: October 14, 1818 Mercer County, New Jersey, U.S.
- Died: November 5, 1878 (aged 60) Yonkers, New York, U.S.
- Resting place: Oakland Cemetery
- Party: Republican

Alexander Smith (October 14, 1818 – November 5, 1878) was a Yonkers, New York, businessman and political figure who founded the Alexander Smith & Sons Carpet Company and won election to the United States House of Representatives but died hours after being informed of his victory.

== Biography ==
Alexander Smith was born in Mercer County, New Jersey, on October 14, 1818. He was raised on his family's farm, educated in New Jersey, and moved with his family to West Farms, New York, in 1834.

Smith became interested in manufacturing, and in 1844 established a shop in West Farms for making looms and carpets. The shop caught fire and was rebuilt, and after a second fire in 1864 Smith reestablished his business in Yonkers. His business prospered, especially after he invented a loom suitable for weaving fine carpets, which other carpet makers used under licensing agreements with Smith, and his two factories eventually employed more than 3,000 people.

A Republican, in 1878 he was the party's nominee for Congress in New York's 12th District. He became ill on election day, and died just a few hours after being informed that he had won.

Smith died in Yonkers on November 5, 1878. He was buried at Oakland Cemetery in Yonkers.

His company continued to operate, and through successive mergers eventually moved to Mississippi as part of Mohawk Industries.

The Alexander Smith Carpet Mills Historic District in Yonkers was established in 1983, and contains many of the buildings that made up the factory and offices before the company moved out of New York.

== See also ==
- List of United States representatives-elect who never took their seats

U.S. House of Representatives
Preceded by Clarkson Potter	Member-elect of the U.S. House of Representatives from New York's 12th congressional district 1878	Succeeded by Waldo Hutchins
