= Dudley Farlin =

American politician

Member of the U.S. House of Representatives from New York's 13th district
- In office March 4, 1835 – March 3, 1837
- Preceded by: Reuben Whallon
- Succeeded by: John Palmer

Personal details
- Born: September 2, 1777 Norwich, Connecticut, USA
- Died: September 26, 1837 (aged 60) Warrensburg, New York, USA
- Resting place: Warrensburg Cemetery
- Party: Jacksonian

Dudley Farlin (September 2, 1777 – September 26, 1837) was an American businessman and politician who served one term as a U.S. representative from New York from 1835 to 1837.

== Biography ==
Born in Norwich, Connecticut, Farlin moved to Dutchess County, New York, in early youth, and later to Warren County.

=== Early career ===
He engaged in the lumber and grain business. Supervisor of the town of Warrensburg from 1818 to 1820, 1827, and 1828. Sheriff of Warren County in 1821, 1822, and again in 1828. He served as member of the State assembly in 1824.

=== Congress ===
Farlin was elected as a Jacksonian to the Twenty-fourth Congress (March 4, 1835 – March 3, 1837).

=== Later career and death ===
He resumed his former business pursuits.

He died in Warrensburg, New York, on September 26, 1837. He was interred in Warrensburg Cemetery.

U.S. House of Representatives
Preceded by Reuben Whallon	Member of the U.S. House of Representatives from New York's 13th congressional district 1835–1837	Succeeded by John Palmer
