= Gideon Reynolds =

American politician

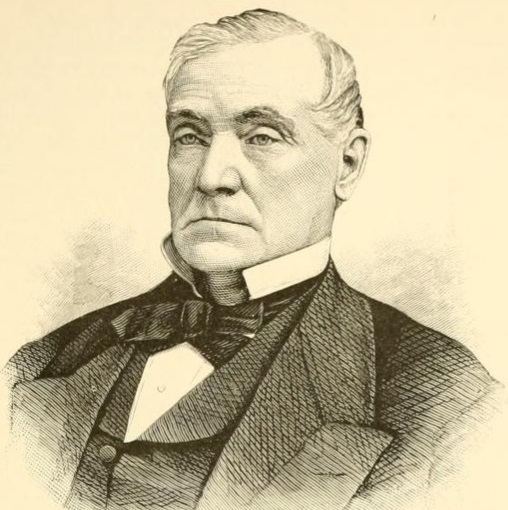
Gideon Reynolds, New York Congressman

Gideon Reynolds (August 9, 1813 – July 13, 1896) was a U.S. representative from New York.

Born in Petersburg, New York, Reynolds was educated in private schools. He moved with his father to Hoosick, New York in 1836 and engaged in agricultural pursuits. He served as member of the State assembly in 1839. Sheriff of Rensselaer County, New York from 1843 to 1846.

Reynolds was elected as a Whig to the Thirtieth and Thirty-first Congresses (March 4, 1847 – March 3, 1851). He was not a candidate for renomination in 1850. He resumed agricultural pursuits in Rensselaer County. He served as delegate to the Republican National Conventions in 1856 and 1860. He served as member of the Republican State central committee. He was appointed internal revenue collector for the fifteenth district of New York on September 9, 1862, and served until March 31, 1865, when he resigned. He served as member of the board of supervisors of Hoosick in 1875. He died in Hoosick, New York, July 13, 1896. He was interred in the Hoosick Rural Cemetery.

== Sources ==
- United States Congress. "Gideon Reynolds (id: R000172)". Biographical Directory of the United States Congress.

U.S. House of Representatives
Preceded by Thomas C. Ripley	Member of the U.S. House of Representatives from New York's 12th congressional district 1847–1851	Succeeded by David L. Seymour
