= Reuben Whallon =

American politician

Member of the United States House of Representatives
- In office March 4, 1833 – March 3, 1835
- Preceded by: William G. Angel
- Succeeded by: Dudley Farlin
- Constituency: New York's 13th congressional district

Member of the New York State Assembly
- In office January 1, 1811 – December 31, 1811 Serving with John Baker, John Richards, Isaac Sargent, David Woods
- Preceded by: Kitchel Bishop, John Gale, Jason Kellogg, William Livingston, Roger Skinner
- Succeeded by: Lyman Hall, James Hill, John Kirtland, Alexander Livingston, Halsey Rogers
- Constituency: Washington County
- In office November 1, 1808 – December 31, 1809 Serving with Kitchel Bishop, James Hill, Alexander Livingston, Roger Skinner
- Preceded by: Kitchel Bishop, Thomas Cornell, Lyman Hall, James Hill, Henry Mattison, Gideon Taft
- Succeeded by: Kitchel Bishop, John Gale, Jason Kellogg, William Livingston, Roger Skinner

First Judge of the Essex County, New York Court of Common Pleas
- In office February 1, 1831 – April 18, 1838
- Preceded by: Dean Edson
- Succeeded by: Wolcott Tyrell

Town Supervisor of Essex, New York
- In office 1827–1829
- Preceded by: Ransom Noble
- Succeeded by: John Gould
- In office 1818–1819
- Preceded by: Unknown (town records incomplete)
- Succeeded by: Ralph Hascall

Personal details
- Born: December 7, 1776 Bedminster, New Jersey, U.S.
- Died: April 15, 1843 (aged 66) Argyle, New York. U.S.
- Resting place: Whallons Bay Cemetery, Essex, New York, U.S.
- Party: Jacksonian (from 1832)
- Other political affiliations: Democratic-Republican (1806–1832)
- Occupation: Businessman

Reuben Whallon (December 7, 1776 – April 15, 1843) was an American businessman and politician who served one term as a U.S. representative from New York from 1833 to 1835.

== Biography ==
Born in Bedminster, New Jersey, Whallon attended the common schools. He moved to Argyle, New York. He was appointed Justice of the Peace for the township of Argyle March 13, 1806, and served until 1811.

He moved to Essex, New York, in 1814. He was a large landowner, farmer, merchant, mill owner, and ironmaster. He served as captain and major in the New York State Militia in 1803–1814. He served as member of the State assembly in 1808, 1809, and 1811. Supervisor of the town of Essex in 1818, 1819, 1827, and 1828. First judge of Essex County Court of Common Pleas 1831–1838.

=== Congress ===
Whallon was elected as a Jacksonian to the Twenty-third Congress (March 4, 1833 – March 3, 1835). He served as chairman of the Committee on Expenditures on Public Buildings (Twenty-third Congress).

=== Later career and death ===
He again engaged in his former business pursuits.

He died on his estate at Whallons Bay, town of Essex, New York, on April 15, 1843. He was interred in Whallons Bay Cemetery.

== Sources ==
- United States Congress. "Reuben Whallon (id: W000321)". Biographical Directory of the United States Congress.

U.S. House of Representatives
Preceded by William G. Angel	Member of the U.S. House of Representatives from New York's 13th congressional district 1833–1835	Succeeded by Dudley Farlin
