= Abraham Dowdney =

American politician

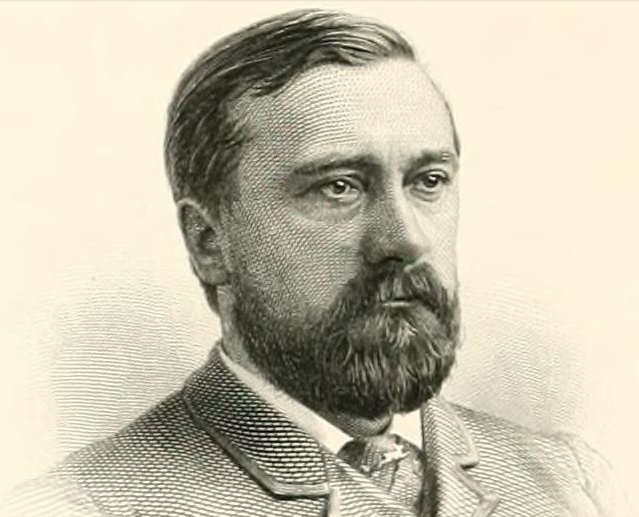

Member of the U.S. House of Representatives from New York's 12th district
- In office March 4, 1885 – December 10, 1886
- Preceded by: Waldo Hutchins
- Succeeded by: William Bourke Cockran

Personal details
- Born: October 31, 1841 Youghal, Ireland
- Died: December 10, 1886 (aged 45) New York City, US
- Resting place: Calvary Cemetery, Queens, New York
- Party: Democratic

Military service
- Allegiance: United States
- Branch/service: United States Army; Union Army
- Rank: Captain
- Unit: 132nd New York Volunteer Infantry Regiment
- Battles/wars: American Civil War

Abraham Dowdney (October 31, 1841 – December 10, 1886) was a 19th-century American businessman and politician who served as a United States representative from New York, as well as an officer in the Union Army during the American Civil War.

== Biography ==
Born in Youghal, Ireland, Dowdney emigrated to the United States in 1853 with his parents, who settled in New York City. He attended public schools, and he engaged in the building and contracting business.

Dowdney served in the Civil War as a captain in the 132nd New York Volunteer Infantry Regiment in 1862 and 1863. His regiment served primarily in Virginia and North Carolina with the XVIII Corps.

After the Civil War, Dowdney was chairman of the public school trustees of New York City from 1882 to 1885. He was elected as a Democrat to the 49th Congress and served from March 4, 1885, until his death.

Dowdney died in New York City on December 10, 1886, at the age of 45. He was interred in Calvary Cemetery in Long Island City.

== See also ==
- List of members of the United States Congress who died in office (1790–1899)

U.S. House of Representatives
Preceded by Waldo Hutchins	Member of the U.S. House of Representatives from New York's 12th congressional district March 4, 1885 – December 10, 1886	Succeeded by William Bourke Cockran
