= Ezra Graves =

American judge

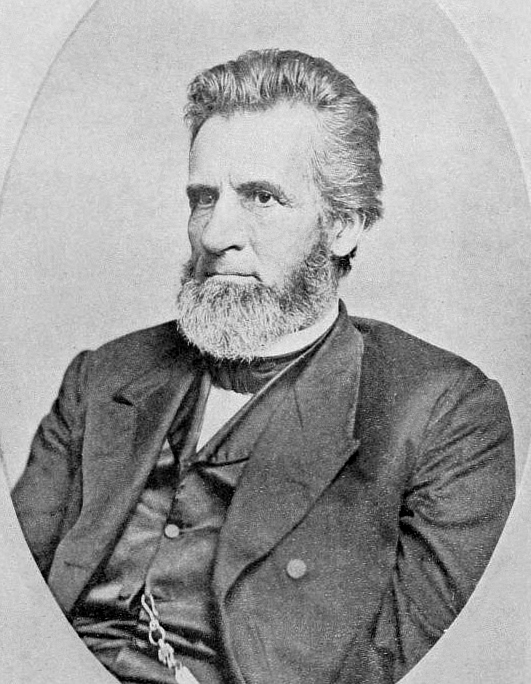
Ezra Graves

Ezra Graves (December 1, 1803 – January 8, 1883) was an American lawyer and politician from New York.

== Life ==
He was born on December 1, 1803, in Russia, Herkimer County, New York, the son of Assemblyman John Graves. He became a tanner and currier. In 1827, he married Maria Card, and they had three children. Then he studied law, was admitted to the bar in 1835, and practiced in Herkimer.

He was Undersheriff of Herkimer County while his father was Sheriff; then Commissioner of Deeds; Supervisor of the Town of Herkimer in 1840 and 1841; and President of the Village of Herkimer in 1845

He was First Judge of the Herkimer County Court from 1845 to 1847. After the re-organization of the New York court system, he was Judge and Surrogate of the Herkimer County Court from 1847 to 1855, and from 1860 to 1863.

He was a delegate to the 1856 Republican National Convention. In 1858, he was Temporary Chairman of the Republican state convention. He was a delegate to the New York State Constitutional Convention of 1867–68. From 1873 to 1875, he was an Inspector of State Prisons, elected at the New York state election, 1872.

He died on January 8, 1883, in Herkimer, New York.
