= John Palmer (1785–1840) =

American politician (1785–1840)

Member of the U.S. House of Representatives from New York
- In office March 4, 1817 – March 4, 1819
- Preceded by: Asa Adgate
- Succeeded by: Ezra C. Gross
- Constituency: 12th district
- In office March 4, 1837 – March 4, 1839
- Preceded by: Dudley Farlin
- Succeeded by: Augustus C. Hand
- Constituency: 13th district

Personal details
- Born: January 29, 1785 Hoosick, New York, U.S.
- Died: December 8, 1840 (aged 55) French West Indies
- Resting place: Saint Bartholomews Cemetery; Gustavia, Saint Barthélemy
- Party: Democratic-Republican
- Relatives: George William Palmer (nephew)
- Education: Williams College
- Occupation: Politician, lawyer

John Palmer (January 29, 1785 – December 8, 1840) was an American lawyer and politician who served as a member of the United States House of Representatives from New York from 1817 to 1819.

== Biography ==
He was born in Hoosick, Rensselaer County, New York. After completing preparatory studies, he graduated from Williams College in Williamstown, Massachusetts, studied law, and was admitted to the bar. He then commenced practice in Plattsburgh, New York in 1810. Palmer also served as paymaster in the Eighth Regiment of the New York Militia during the War of 1812.

=== Congress ===
Palmer was elected to Congress as a Democratic-Republican to the fifteenth Congress (March 4, 1817 – March 3, 1819).

=== Later career ===
After leaving Congress, he was a district attorney until 1832. For part of the year 1832, he was a member of the New York State Assembly, after which he served as judge of Clinton County until 1837, when he resigned. He was elected as a Democrat to the twenty-fifth Congress (March 4, 1837 – March 3, 1839), after which he did not run for reelection.

=== Death ===
Palmer died in St. Bartholomew in the French West Indies at the age of 55. He was buried at Saint Bartholomews Cemetery in Gustavia, Saint Barthélemy. There is a cenotaph to his memory at Riverside Cemetery in Plattsburgh.

John Palmer was the uncle of George William Palmer, also a U.S. Representative from New York.

U.S. House of Representatives
Preceded by Asa Adgate, John Savage	Member of the U.S. House of Representatives from New York's 12th congressional district 1817–1819 with John Savage	Succeeded by Ezra C. Gross, Nathaniel Pitcher
Preceded by Dudley Farlin	Member of the U.S. House of Representatives from New York's 13th congressional district 1837–1839	Succeeded by Augustus C. Hand
