= Suraj Patel =

American politician (born 1983)

Personal details
- Born: December 20, 1983 (age 42) Mississippi, U.S.
- Party: Democratic
- Education: Stanford University (BA); University of Cambridge (MPhil); New York University (JD)

Suraj Patel is an American lawyer, professor, and politician. Patel is a member of the Democratic party, and was a candidate for the newly created 12th congressional district in Manhattan, New York City. The district covers the northern end of Central Park southward to Union Square.

Patel served in the 2008 Obama Presidential Campaign as an organizer, and later on the advance team for the White House from 2008 to 2016, working on Obama's 2012 reelection. Patel is an adjunct professor at NYU Stern, lecturing on business ethics.

== Electoral history ==
Patel first ran unsuccessfully against incumbent Representative Carolyn Maloney in 2018, and again in 2020.

Patel announced his candidacy for the 2022 US congressional elections on February 14, 2022. He was endorsed by environmental lawyer Steven Donziger in May 2022, by former Democratic presidential and New York mayoral candidate Andrew Yang in June 2022, and journalist Matthew Yglesias. Running against Maloney and Jerrold Nadler in the redrawn 12th congressional district, Patel finished in third place with 19 percent of the vote.

A 30-second campaign advertisement for Patel was required to remove at least one "sensitive" topic before it aired on the streaming service Hulu. The original advertisement had included footage of the January 6th Attack on the United States Capitol, and references to climate change.

== Political positions ==
Patel describes himself as a "practical and progressive" Democrat. His platform for the 2022 US congressional election has included a technocratic focus on reducing housing and transit regulation, along with support for rezoning initiatives. A self-described "YIMBY", Patel supports the theory of market urbanism that encourages large-scale infrastructure and zoning reforms to address high housing costs. Patel has advocated for increased road safety standards and reforming street design.

Patel is a proponent of “The Abundant Society” plan, a supply-side progressivism policy targeted at reducing inflation through a combination of tariff reductions, suspending the Jones Act and Foreign Dredge Act, and expanding domestic manufacturing through passing federal spending bills like the COMPETES Act.

Patel has previously advocated for increased competition from challengers in congressional primary races. Patel supports congestion pricing.

== Personal life ==
Patel was born in Mississippi to Gujarati parents, and grew up in Indianapolis. He speaks English and Gujarati. In 2022, Patel became engaged to Emily Bina, a producer at The Atlantic.

== Selected works ==
- Delayed Justice: A Case Study of Texaco and the Republic of Ecuador's Operations, Harms, and Possible Redress in the Ecuadorian Amazon Tulane Environmental Law Journal, 2012
- The Pandemic Shows Why the U.S. Must Invest in Public Research Scientific American, 2020
