= Brownell–Cornell–Gibbs Farmstead =

- U.S. National Register of Historic Places
- Location within New York Location within the United States
- Location: 606 Groveside Rd., near Buskirk, New York
- Coordinates: 42°52′59″N 73°26′27″W
- Area: 124 acres (50 ha)
- Built: c. 1800-1825
- Architectural style: Federal
- MPS: Farmsteads of Pittstown, New York MPS
- NRHP reference No.: 12000796
- Added to NRHP: September 19, 2012

Brownell–Cornell–Gibbs Farmstead is a historic home and farm located near Buskirk, Rensselaer County, New York. The farmhouse was built between about 1800 and 1825, and consists of a two-story, banked, rectangular frame main block with an attached large two-story woodshed. It has a one-story, hip roofed addition dated to 1943, and Federal style design elements. Also on the property are the contributing threshing barn (c. 1800), tool barn / grain house (c. 1830), hen house (1936), garage (1926), and wagon shed (c. 1940).

It was listed on the National Register of Historic Places in 2012.
