= David Abel Russell =

American politician (1780–1861)

Member of the U.S. House of Representatives from New York's 12th district
- In office March 4, 1835 – March 3, 1841
- Preceded by: Henry C. Martindale
- Succeeded by: Bernard Blair

Member of the New York State Assembly from the Washington County district
- In office 30 January 1816 – 17 April 1816
- In office 5 January 1830 – 20 April 1830
- In office 1 January 1833 – 30 April 1833

Personal details
- Born: 1780 Petersburg, New York, US
- Died: November 24, 1861 (aged 80–81) Salem, New York, US
- Resting place: Evergreen Cemetery, Salem
- Party: Anti-Jacksonian, Whig

David Abel Russell (1780 – November 24, 1861) was a United States representative from New York.

Russell was born in Petersburg, New York and trained as a lawyer and practiced in Salem, New York. He married on February 14, 1805, in Lansingburgh, New York to Alida Lansing, daughter of Capt. Cornelius Lansing and granddaughter of the founder of Lansingburgh, Abraham Jacob Lansing.

Russell was appointed Justice of the Peace in 1807. He was District Attorney of the Fourth District from 1813 to 1815, during the War of 1812. He was a member of the New York State Assembly in 1816, then over a decade later as an Anti-Jacksonian in the 1830 and 1833 sessions.

He was elected to Congress as an Anti-Jacksonian and later became a Whig. He was elected to three consecutive terms (the 24th, 25th and 26th) in Congress, from March 4, 1835, to March 3, 1841.

He died in Salem and was buried in Evergreen Cemetery.

== Personal life ==
David Abel Russell married Alida Lansing on Valentine's Day, 1805. She was the fifth of eight children of Capt. Cornelius Lansing and Hester van Der Heyden, who married on March 13, 1773. Their sons were David Allen Russell, a Union general killed in action, and William A. Russell.

U.S. House of Representatives
Preceded by Henry C. Martindale	Member of the U.S. House of Representatives from New York's 12th congressional district March 4, 1835 – March 3, 1841	Succeeded by Bernard Blair
