= Thomas C. Ripley =

American politician

Member of the U.S. House of Representatives from New York's 12th district
- In office December 7, 1846 – March 3, 1847
- Preceded by: Richard P. Herrick
- Succeeded by: Gideon Reynolds

Personal details
- Born: Thomas Cornell Ripley; January 2, 1807 Broadalbin, New York, U.S.
- Died: February 12, 1897 (aged 90) Saginaw, Michigan, U.S.
- Resting place: Oakwood Cemetery, Saginaw, Michigan, U.S.
- Party: Whig
- Education: Rensselaer Polytechnic Institute

Thomas C. Ripley (January 2, 1807 – February 12, 1897) was a United States representative from New York.

== Biography ==
Thomas Cornell Ripley was born in Broadalbin, New York on January 2, 1807. (Some sources indicate Easton, New York.) He graduated from Rensselaer Polytechnic Institute in 1828, Studied law, was admitted to the bar, and practised in Little Falls. He subsequently relocated to Schaghticoke.

Ripley was elected as a Whig to the 29th United States Congress, filling the vacancy caused by the death of Richard P. Herrick. He served from December 1846 to March 1847, and was not a candidate for a full term in 1846.

In 1854, he moved to Saginaw, Michigan, where he farmed and continued to practice law. He joined the Republican Party at its founding and held several local offices, including School Superintendent. He served in the Michigan House of Representatives from 1873 to 1874.

Ripley died in Saginaw on February 12, 1897.

U.S. House of Representatives
Preceded by Richard P. Herrick	Member of the U.S. House of Representatives from New York's 12th congressional district December 7, 1846 – March 3, 1847	Succeeded by Gideon Reynolds
