= Hoosick, New York =

- Town
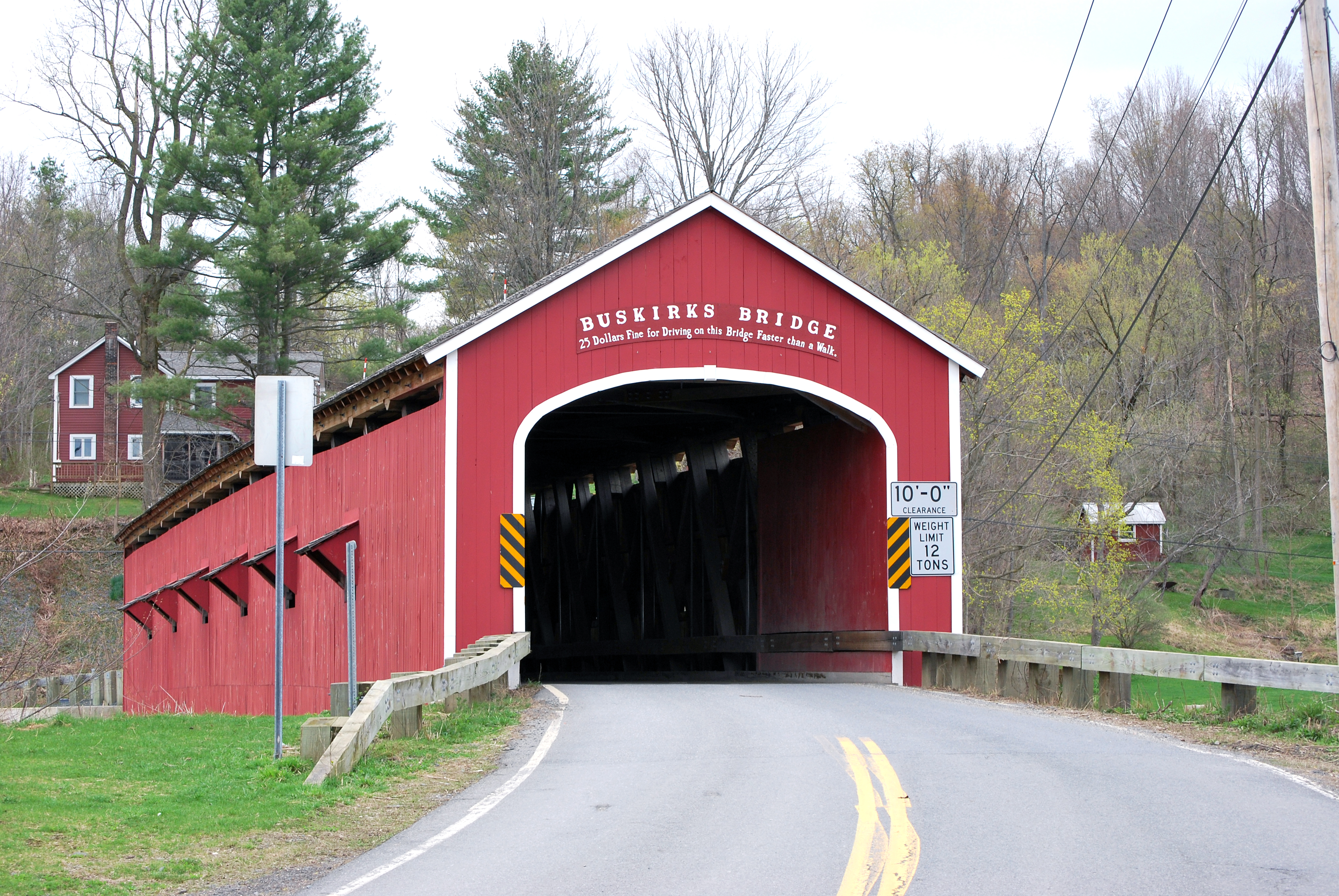
- Buskirk Bridge

- Location in Rensselaer County and the state of New York.
- Coordinates: 42°54′8″N 73°21′18″W
- Country: United States
- State: New York
- County: Rensselaer

Government
  - Town Supervisor: Mark Surdam (R)&(D)
  - Deputy Town Supervisor: Jeff Wysocki (R)

Area
  - Total: 63.14 sq mi (163.54 km^{2})
  - Land: 63.03 sq mi (163.25 km^{2})
  - Water: 0.11 sq mi (0.29 km^{2})
- Elevation: 407 ft (124 m)

Population (2020)
  - Total: 6,711
  - Density: 106.5/sq mi (41.11/km^{2})
- Time zone: UTC-5 (Eastern (EST))
  - Summer (DST): UTC-4 (EDT)
- ZIP code: 12089
- Area code: 518
- FIPS code: 36-35463
- GNIS feature ID: 0979072
- Website: Town of Hoosick website

Hoosick is a town in Rensselaer County, New York, United States. The population was 6,711 at the 2020 census. It was named from the Hoosic River.

The Town of Hoosick is in the northeastern corner of Rensselaer County.

== History ==
The town of Hoosick was organized in 1788, in Albany County, three years before the creation of Rensselaer County in 1791. The region was formerly the District of Hoosick (1772) and previous to that the Hoosick Patent (1688).

The Battle of Bennington of the American Revolution was fought northeast of Hoosick, on a farm owned by John Green, in the community of Walloomsac.

== Geography ==
According to the United States Census Bureau, the town has a total area of 63.2 square miles (164 km^{2}), of which 63.0 square miles (163 km^{2}) is land and 0.1 square miles (0.26 km^{2}) (0.21%) is water.

The northern town line is the boundary of Washington County, New York, and the eastern town line is the border of Vermont. The Hoosic River is an important waterway in the town.

=== Climate ===
Climate data for Buskirk, Hoosick, New York, 1991–2020 normals, extremes 2004–present
Month	Jan	Feb	Mar	Apr	May	Jun	Jul	Aug	Sep	Oct	Nov	Dec	Year
Record high °F (°C)	66 (19)	75 (24)	79 (26)	92 (33)	93 (34)	96 (36)	96 (36)	96 (36)	93 (34)	84 (29)	77 (25)	68 (20)	96 (36)
Mean maximum °F (°C)	54.6 (12.6)	53.7 (12.1)	63.9 (17.7)	79.6 (26.4)	88.5 (31.4)	90.1 (32.3)	91.1 (32.8)	87.8 (31.0)	86.7 (30.4)	76.9 (24.9)	68.5 (20.3)	58.7 (14.8)	93.0 (33.9)
Mean daily maximum °F (°C)	33.1 (0.6)	35.5 (1.9)	44.2 (6.8)	58.8 (14.9)	70.5 (21.4)	78.3 (25.7)	82.5 (28.1)	80.8 (27.1)	73.8 (23.2)	61.6 (16.4)	48.6 (9.2)	38.3 (3.5)	58.8 (14.9)
Daily mean °F (°C)	22.2 (−5.4)	23.7 (−4.6)	32.3 (0.2)	45.9 (7.7)	57.1 (13.9)	65.7 (18.7)	70.3 (21.3)	68.2 (20.1)	60.9 (16.1)	49.6 (9.8)	38.1 (3.4)	28.6 (−1.9)	46.9 (8.3)
Mean daily minimum °F (°C)	11.3 (−11.5)	11.8 (−11.2)	20.4 (−6.4)	33.0 (0.6)	43.7 (6.5)	53.0 (11.7)	58.0 (14.4)	55.5 (13.1)	48.0 (8.9)	37.5 (3.1)	27.6 (−2.4)	18.9 (−7.3)	34.9 (1.6)
Mean minimum °F (°C)	−11.1 (−23.9)	−7.6 (−22.0)	2.6 (−16.3)	20.9 (−6.2)	29.9 (−1.2)	39.9 (4.4)	49.0 (9.4)	45.0 (7.2)	34.5 (1.4)	24.0 (−4.4)	13.9 (−10.1)	0.7 (−17.4)	−13.9 (−25.5)
Record low °F (°C)	−25 (−32)	−19 (−28)	−9 (−23)	6 (−14)	26 (−3)	33 (1)	43 (6)	42 (6)	27 (−3)	17 (−8)	−2 (−19)	−14 (−26)	−25 (−32)
Average precipitation inches (mm)	2.74 (70)	2.36 (60)	3.21 (82)	3.43 (87)	3.57 (91)	4.55 (116)	4.56 (116)	4.17 (106)	3.86 (98)	3.94 (100)	3.29 (84)	3.68 (93)	43.36 (1,103)
Average snowfall inches (cm)	12.3 (31)	17.5 (44)	7.0 (18)	1.1 (2.8)	0.2 (0.51)	0.0 (0.0)	0.0 (0.0)	0.0 (0.0)	0.0 (0.0)	0.7 (1.8)	3.3 (8.4)	12.0 (30)	54.1 (136.51)
Average extreme snow depth inches (cm)	7.0 (18)	10.4 (26)	7.7 (20)	1.0 (2.5)	0.2 (0.51)	0.0 (0.0)	0.0 (0.0)	0.0 (0.0)	0.0 (0.0)	0.5 (1.3)	2.1 (5.3)	6.7 (17)	13.2 (34)
Average precipitation days (≥ 0.01 in)	11.9	9.4	10.4	14.0	14.1	13.7	11.8	11.1	9.5	13.9	10.7	13.4	143.9
Average snowy days (≥ 0.1 in)	9.6	7.9	4.2	1.2	0.1	0.0	0.0	0.0	0.0	0.2	2.4	7.0	32.6
Source 1: NOAA
Source 2: National Weather Service (mean maxima/minima, precip days, snow/snow days/snow depth 2006–2020)

== Demographics ==
Historical population
Census	Pop.	Note	%±
1820	3,375		—
1830	3,582		6.1%
1840	3,539		−1.2%
1850	3,724		5.2%
1860	4,446		19.4%
1870	5,728		28.8%
1880	7,914		38.2%
1890	10,471		32.3%
1900	8,631		−17.6%
1910	8,315		−3.7%
1920	6,858		−17.5%
1930	7,026		2.4%
1940	6,549		−6.8%
1950	6,520		−0.4%
1960	6,490		−0.5%
1970	6,651		2.5%
1980	6,732		1.2%
1990	6,696		−0.5%
2000	6,759		0.9%
2010	6,924		2.4%
2020	6,711		−3.1%
U.S. Decennial Census

As of the census of 2000, there were 6,759 people, 2,620 households, and 1,823 families residing in the town. The population density was 107.3 inhabitants per square mile (41.4/km^{2}). There were 2,892 housing units at an average density of 45.9 units per square mile (17.7 units/km^{2}). The racial makeup of the town was 97.96% White, 0.49% African American, 0.30% Native American, 0.38% Asian, 0.03% Pacific Islander, 0.34% from other races, and 0.50% from two or more races. Hispanic or Latino of any race were 0.84% of the population.

There were 2,620 households, out of which 32.7% had children under the age of 18 living with them, 54.8% were married couples living together, 10.9% had a female householder with no husband present, and 30.4% were non-families. 25.6% of all households were made up of individuals, and 11.9% had someone living alone who was 65 years of age or older. The average household size was 2.55 and the average family size was 3.06.

In the town, the population was spread out, with 25.9% under the age of 18, 7.5% from 18 to 24, 28.0% from 25 to 44, 22.3% from 45 to 64, and 16.2% who were 65 years of age or older. The median age was 39 years. For every 100 females, there were 91.4 males. For every 100 females age 18 and over, there were 90.5 males.

The median income for a household in the town was $41,304, and the median income for a family was $46,442. Males had a median income of $35,899 versus $24,211 for females. The per capita income for the town was $20,614. About 5.3% of families and 6.7% of the population were below the poverty line, including 9.5% of those under age 18 and 7.9% of those age 65 or over.

== Communities and locations in Hoosick ==
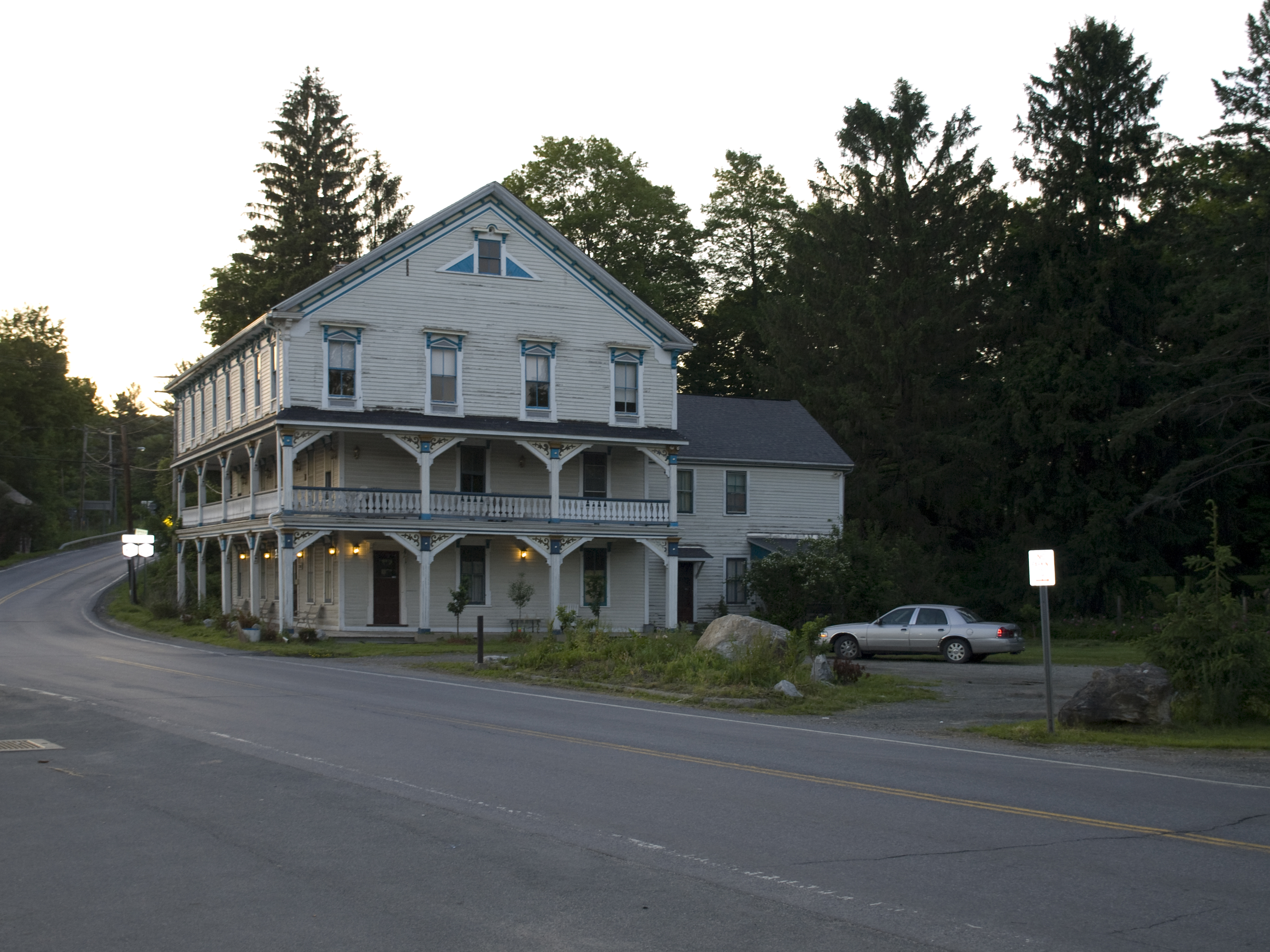
Delany hotel, the hamlet of North Hoosick

- Buskirk (formerly "Buskirk Bridge") – A hamlet in the northwestern corner of the town on Route 67. The Buskirk Covered Bridge and Brownell–Cornell–Gibbs Farmstead are listed on the National Register of Historic Places.
- Eagle Bridge – A hamlet east of Buskirk on Route 67
- East Buskirk – A hamlet south of Buskirk on Route 103
- East Hoosick – A hamlet east of Hoosick Falls near the eastern town line
  - Mapletown – A neighborhood within East Hoosick
- Hoosick (or "Hoosick Corners") – A hamlet south of Hoosick Falls in the southeastern section of the town. The Breese-Reynolds House, David Mathews House, and Tibbits House are listed on the National Register of Historic Places.
- Hoosick Falls – The Village of Hoosick Falls is near the center of the town
- Hoosick Junction – A location northwest of Hoosick Falls
- North Hoosick (formerly "St. Croix") – A hamlet north of Hoosick Falls on Route 22
- Potterville – A hamlet in the southwestern part of the town on Route 7
- Southwest Hoosick – A hamlet near the western town line and south of West Hoosick
- Trumanville – A former community, now part of Hoosick Falls
- Walloomsac – A hamlet east of North Hoosick on Route 67, site of the Bennington Battlefield
- West Hoosick – A hamlet west of Hoosick Falls and near the western town line
- White Creek Station – A location in the northeastern corner of the town

== Notable people ==
Among the notable natives of Hoosick are:

- Chester Arthur, US president, lived in Hoosick for a period of time
- (Big Band Singers) Bob Eberly and Ray Eberle
- Romulus Whitaker, Indian herpetologist
- Simon Fraser, born in Mapletown, town of Hoosick. He was an explorer who charted much of what is now British Columbia. A river, mountain, and Simon Fraser University there are named after him.
- Joshua Furnas, athlete, entrepreneur, advocate
- Eugene Goossen (1921–1997), art critic and historian, and his wife Patricia Johanson (b. 1940), noted environmental sculptor, in Buskirk hamlet
- Emory S. Harris, US Marshal for Vermont
- Annie Hawks (1836–1918), poet, gospel hymnist
- Andrew Parsons (American politician) (1817–1855) 9th lieutenant governor of Michigan and 10th governor of Michigan
- Harriet Hoctor, dancer
- Jenny Holzer, post-modern installation artist, currently resides in Hoosick
- Phipps W. Lake (1789–1860), member of the Wisconsin State Assembly, was born in Hoosick
- Grandma Moses (1860–1961), painter whose work was first discovered in a Hoosick Falls drugstore (Thorpe's Pharmacy, at the corner of John Street and New York State Route 22) in 1938, is buried in Hoosick
- John Palmer (1785–1840), served two non-consecutive terms in the United States Congress
- William David Thomas (1880–1936), member of the U.S. House of Representatives, the 29th District, from 1933 until his death in Washington, D.C. in 1936. Pharmacist and owner of the Thomas Pharmacy in Hoosick Falls where Grandma Moses' paintings were discovered. Buried at Maplegrove Cemetery in the village.
