= Angel (surname) =

Angel is the surname of Greek and Latin origin, and is normally a short form of other Greek-based names such as; Angelos, Angelis, Angelopoulos, or Di Angelo (Italian). It ultimately derives from the Greek personal name Ευάγγελος (Evangelos) meaning 'bringer of good news' or 'messenger'. Here are a few individuals with the surname

- Andrea Angel (1877–1917), British chemist
- Asher Angel (born 2002), American actor
- Benjamin F. Angel (1815–1894), American diplomat
- Dan Angel, American film producer
- Fernand Angel (1881–1950), French herpetologist
- Hayyim Angel, rabbi and author
- Hayyim Vidal Angel (fl. mid-18th century), Greek rabbi
- Heather Angel (actress) (1909–1986), English actress
- Heather Angel (photographer) (born 1941), British nature photographer, author and television presenter
- Herbert E. Angel (1907–1999), American Archivist
- Jack Angel (1930–2021), American voice actor and radio personality
- James R. Angel (1836–1899), Washington Territory and New York City politician
- Jim Angel (1940–2007), Australian radio news presenter
- Jimmie Angel (1899–1956), American aviator and namesake of Angel Falls
- Jo Angel (born 1968), Australian cricketer
- John Lawrence Angel (1915–1986), anthropologist
- Juan Pablo Ángel (born 1975), Colombian footballer
- Katherine Angel, British academic
- Marc D. Angel, rabbi and author
- Marie Angel (artist) (1923–2010), English artist and illustrator
- Mark Angel (footballer), footballer
- Mark Angel (comedian), comedian
- Paula Angel (c. 1842–1861), Mexican-American woman executed for the murder of her lover
- Paulina Ángel (born 2001), Colombian boxer
- Steve Angel, American business executive and CEO of CSX Corporation
- Vanessa Angel (born 1966), English-American actress and model
- Wilkes Angel (1817–1889), New York politician
- William G. Angel (1790–1858), Congressman from New York
- William P. Angel (1813–1869), New York politician
- Yvette Angel (born 1963), American basketball player and coach
- Zuzu Angel (1921–1976), Brazilian-American fashion designer who opposed the Brazilian military dictatorship after the disappearance of her son
