= James Angel =

James Angel may refer to:

- James Angel (businessman) (1838–1918), Canadian manufacturer of metal products
- Roger Angel (James Roger Prior Angel, born 1941), British-born American astronomer
- James R. Angel (1836–1899), American lawyer
- Jim Angel (1940–2007), Australian radio news presenter
- Jimmie Angel (1899–1956), American aviator

== See also ==
- James Angell (disambiguation)
- Jim Angle (1946–2022), American journalist
