= 1856 New York state election =

- November 4, 1856

The 1856 New York state election was held on November 4, 1856, to elect the governor, the lieutenant governor, a Canal Commissioner, an Inspector of State Prisons and the Clerk of the Court of Appeals, as well as all members of the New York State Assembly.

== History ==
After losing the elections of 1853, 1854 and 1855 due to the split of the Party and running separate tickets, the national organization of the Democratic Party urged the factions to re-unite. The Soft state convention met on July 30 at Market Hall in Syracuse, New York, Gouverneur Kemble was Temporary Chairman. The Hard state convention met at the same time at Corinthian Hall in the same city, Samuel Fowler was Temporary Chairman. The Soft delegates adopted a resolution to unite with the Hards and marched to Corinthian Hall where both factions assembled together. William C. Crain was chosen President, William M. Tweed was one of the secretaries. Judge Amasa J. Parker (a Soft) was nominated for Governor on the fourth ballot (first ballot:Addison Gardiner 69, David L. Seymour 46, Parker 33, Fernando Wood 25, John Vanderbilt 21, Horatio Seymour 21, Augustus Schell 11, E. Corning 9, Judge Brown 8, Henry W. Rogers 7, Daniel S. Dickinson 1, Samuel Fowler 1, Brownson 1, Porter 1; second ballot: Gardiner 78, D. L. Seymour 67, Parker 39, Wood 26, Schell 22, Vanderbilt 18, Corning 3, Fowler 1; third ballot: Gardiner 80, D. L. Seymour 60, Parker 39, Schell 30, Wood 22, Vanderbilt, 15; then the names of Schell, Gardiner and Wood were withdrawn). The convention then adjourned and re-assembled the next day to complete the ticket with John Vanderbilt (a Hard) for Lieutenant Governor, and John Leslie Russell (the father of later Attorney General Leslie W. Russell) for Canal Commissioner.

The American state convention met on September 23 and 24 at Rochester, New York, J. W. Barker presided. Erastus Brooks, the editor of the New York Express, was nominated for Governor by acclamation. Lyman Odell was nominated for Lieutenant Governor on the first ballot (the other candidates were Jesse C. Dann and Goodwin Denniston). Amos H. Prescott was nominated for Canal Commissioner. Alexander Mann, of Monroe County, was nominated for Clerk of the Court of Appeals.

The North American state convention, a secession from the American Party which had considered joining the Republicans, met on the same day at the Court House in the same city, F. W. Walker presided. In the afternoon, after some debate, they marched into the American convention and re-united, endorsing their ticket, and declaring support of the American presidential candidates Millard Fillmore and Andrew Jackson Donelson.

== Result ==
The whole Republican ticket was elected. None of the incumbents ran for re-election.

81 Republicans, 31 Democrats and 8 Americans were elected for the session of 1857 to the New York State Assembly.

1856 state election results
Office	Republican ticket		Democratic ticket		American ticket		Liberty and Radical Abolitionist ticket
Governor	John Alsop King	264,400	Amasa J. Parker	198,616	Erastus Brooks	130,870	William Goodell
Lieutenant Governor	Henry R. Selden	266,991	John Vanderbilt	197,811	Lyman Odell	128,913	Austin Ward
Canal Commissioner	Charles H. Sherrill	267,220	John Leslie Russell	196,471	Amos H. Prescott	129,642	James C. Harrington
Inspector of State Prisons	Wesley Bailey	265,969	Matthew T. Brennan	196,848	James P. Sanders	129,881	William W. Chapman
Clerk of the Court of Appeals	Russell F. Hicks	267,061	Horatio G. Warner	197,116	Alexander Mann	129,438	Charles D. B. Mills

== Sources ==
- The Democratic ticket: in Putnam County Courier, September 20, 1856
- Result in The Tribune Almanac 1857

== See also ==
New York gubernatorial elections
