= William Angel =

William Angel may refer to:

- William G. Angel (1790–1858), U.S. Representative for New York
- William P. Angel (1813–1869), American lawyer and politician from New York
