= Charles Sherrill =

Charles Sherrill may refer to:

- Charles H. Sherrill (1814–1887), American politician from New York, father of diplomat Charles H. Sherrill
- Charles H. Sherrill (ambassador) (1867–1936), American diplomat, son of Charles H. Sherrill
- Charles David Sherrill, American computational chemist

== See also ==
- Sweet Charles Sherrell (born 1943), American bassist
