= 1853 New York state election =

- November 8, 1853

The 1853 New York state election was held on November 8, 1853, to elect the Secretary of State, the State Comptroller, the Attorney General, the State Treasurer, the State Engineer, two Judges of the New York Court of Appeals, a Canal Commissioner, an Inspector of State Prisons and the Clerk of the Court of Appeals, as well as all members of the New York State Assembly and the New York State Senate.

== Background ==
After the split of the Democratic Party in 1848 over the slavery question, a large part of the Barnburner faction, who had joined the Free Soil Party, returned to the Democratic Party and re-united with the Hunkers. During the following years, the Hunkers split over the question of reconciliation with the Barnburners. The Hards were against it, denying the Barnburners to gain influence in the Party. The Softs favored reconciliation with the intention of maintaining enough strength to win the elections. Both Hards and Softs favored a compromise on the slavery question: to maintain the status quo and to leave the decision to the local population in new Territories or States if they want slavery or not, as expressed in the Kansas–Nebraska Act. The Barnburners were against the permission of slavery in new Territories or States, but were now the minority in the party.

== Nominations ==
The Free Democratic, or Independent Democratic, Party was the radical anti-slavery faction of the disbanding Free Soil Party, which advocated the immediate abolition of slavery. Their State convention was held on August 31 in Syracuse.

The Democratic state convention met in September in Syracuse. Two chairmen, one Hard and one Soft, were elected who sat one beside the other and commenced proceedings ignoring each other. After some ensuing confusion, the Hards moved out, convened elsewhere, and nominated a state ticket. The Softs and Barnburners nominated their own ticket. Only the nominees for the two judgeships of the Court of Appeals were nominated jointly by Hards and Softs.

The Whig state convention met on October 5 in Syracuse. Benjamin F. Bruce was Temporary Chairman until the choice of Ex-Governor Washington Hunt to preside over the convention. James M. Cook was nominated for Comptroller on the first ballot (vote: Cook 88, Spaulding 29, Josiah B. Williams 8). Elias W. Leavenworth was nominated for Secretary of State on the first ballot (vote: Leavenworth 82, Samuel J. Wilkin 41, Spaulding 3). Elbridge G. Spaulding was nominated for Treasurer on the first ballot (vote: Spaulding 82, Jeremiah Ellsworth 19, Epenetus Crosby 11, Myron H. Clark 10). Ogden Hoffman was nominated for Attorney General on the third ballot (first ballot: Daniel Ullmann 49, Hoffman 45, Roscoe Conkling 27, J. M. Van Cott 4, Thompson 3; second ballot: Hoffman 56, Ullmann 54, Conkling 16, blank 1; third ballot: Hoffman 74, Ullmann 48, Conkling 5, blank 1). Cornelius Gardinier was nominated for Canal Commissioner on the second ballot (first ballot: Gardinier 30, David S. Wright 28, Ebenezer Blakely 19, Samuel P. Russell 16, Thomas Clowes 13, Ogden N. Chapin 13; second ballot: Gardinier 75, Blakely 19, Wright 18, Russell 5, Clowes 3, Chapin 1, Peabody 1, blank 1). Thomas Kirkpatrick was nominated for Inspector of State Prisons on the third ballot (first ballot: Kirkpatrick 22, Henry Underwood 21, Josiah T. Everest 14, Norwood Bowne 13, Alexander H. Wells 9, A. F. Crocker 9, Henry Bradley 9, Abner Baker 7, Benjamin Squire 7, William Lyons 6, Epenetus Crosby 5, Joseph Garling House 5; second ballot: Kirkpatrick 55, Underwood 45, Bowne 17, Everest 11; third ballot: Kirkpatrick 70, Underwood 60). John T. Clark was nominated for State Engineer by acclamation. Benjamin F. Harwood was nominated for Clerk of the Court of Appeals on the first ballot (vote: Harwood 62, E. P. Cole 22, A. T. McCarty 10, J. T. Lamport 8, P. Smith 5, Robinson 2). George Wood was nominated for a full term as Judge of the Court of Appeals on the second vote (88 ayes, 20 noes) after William Rockwell had been rejected in the first vote. Joseph Mullin was nominated for the short term by acclamation.

== Results ==
Due to the split of the Democratic Party, almost the whole Whig ticket was elected. Only the jointly nominated Democratic judges of the Court of Appeals, Ruggles and Denio, were elected. The incumbent Ruggles was re-elected, the incumbent Mather was defeated.

23 Whigs, 7 Hards and 2 Softs were elected to a two-year term (1854–55) in the New York State Senate.

78 Whigs, 24 Hards, 24 Softs and 2 Free Democrats were elected for the session of 1854 to the New York State Assembly.

1853 state election results
Office	Whig ticket		Dem./Soft ticket		Dem./Hard ticket		Free Democratic ticket	
Secretary of State	Elias W. Leavenworth	160,043	Isaac A. Verplanck	96,137	George W. Clinton	99,835	Charles B. Sedgwick	14,985
Comptroller	James M. Cook	164,628	Robert Kelly	97,130	James E. Cooley	92,888	Seth Merrill Gates	16,483
Attorney General	Ogden Hoffman	166,165	Martin Grover	97,158	James T. Brady	92,512	John Jay	16,221
Treasurer	Elbridge G. Spaulding	166,301	Francis Seger	97,054	Winslow C. Watson	96,931	Nathan Soule	14,957
State Engineer	John T. Clark	164,949	Wheeler H. Bristol	97,101	John D. Fay	93,172	Silas Cornell	14,214
Judge of the Court of Appeals (full term)	George Wood	163,920	Charles H. Ruggles	182,615	Charles H. Ruggles		Leonard Gibbs	12,968
Judge of the Court of Appeals (short term)	Joseph Mullin	158,964	Hiram Denio	187,137	Hiram Denio		Edward I. Chase	12,396
Canal Commissioner	Cornelius Gardinier	162,030	Andrew J. Yates	96,273	John C. Mather	97,997	Charles G. Case	12,928
Inspector of State Prisons	Thomas Kirkpatrick	159,667	William C. Dryer	96,434	Miles W. Bennett	98,489	Horace Boardman	16,339
Clerk of the Court of Appeals	Benjamin F. Harwood	158,156	Albert Edgerton	96,267	Samuel S. Bowne	92,412	Thomas G. Frost	14,286

== See also ==
- New York state elections

== Sources ==
- Result in Official State Canvass. New-York Daily Times. January 3, 1854. pp. 6–7
- "The Campaign. Hard-shell Demonstration." New-York Daily Times. November 4, 1853. pp. 1, 8.
