= 1850 New York state election =

- November 5, 1850

The 1850 New York state election was held on Tuesday November 5, 1850, to elect the Governor, the Lieutenant Governor, a Canal Commissioner, an Inspector of State Prisons and the Clerk of the Court of Appeals, as well as all members of the New York State Assembly.

== Nominations ==
=== Whig Party ===
The Whig state convention met on September 27 in Utica; Francis Granger presided. After the nominations of Hunt, Cornell, Blakely, Baker, and Smith, the majority passed a resolution thanking the state's junior U.S. senator William H. Seward for "the signal ability with which he has sustained ... those beloved principles of public policy so long cherished by the Whigs of the Empire State,"—a clear reference to Seward's opposition to the Compromise of 1850. In protest, Granger and other pro-Compromise allies of president Millard Fillmore withdrew from the convention. The conservative faction became known as the Silver Grays after Granger's white hair.

The Silver Grays reconvened at Utica on October 17; Granger again presided. In the interim, Hunt had issued a statement accepting the Compromise while calling for "essential modifications" of the Fugitive Slave Act of 1850. Satisfied, the convention reaffirmed the Utica nominations.

Some conservative Whigs still refused to support Hunt, however. These individuals threw their support behind the Democratic candidate for governor, Horatio Seymour, in hopes of initiating a political realignment in which pro-Compromise Whigs and Democrats would unite in a new Union Party. The New York Journal of Commerce printed a Union ticket headed by Seymour in advance of a Union Safety meeting held at Castle Garden in late October. The meeting adopted resolutions approving of the Compromise and vowing never to vote for any candidate known to be hostile to any of the Compromise measures, including the Fugitive Slave Act—a pledge that targeted Hunt specifically. Antislavery Whigs denounced the meeting as a transparent attempt to divide the Whig Party and elect Seymour under the guise of Unionism.

=== Democratic Party ===
The Democratic state convention met on September 11 in Syracuse and nominated Hunker Seymour and Barnburners Church, Mather, Angel and Benton.

=== Others ===
The Liberty convention met on September 12, and nominated Chaplin and Plumb.

The Anti-Rent state convention met in Albany and nominated a cross-endorsed ticket with Whigs Hunt and Blakely, and Democrats Church, Angel and Benton.

== Results ==
Hunt won the election with one of the smallest majorities in New York history, only 262 votes. Four out of five candidates on the cross-endorsed Anti-Rent ticket were elected, demonstrating their continued influence. The incumbent Benton was re-elected.

Eight-two Whigs, 44 Democrats, one Free Soiler, and one Independent were elected to the State Assembly.

1850 state election results
Office	Whig ticket		Democratic ticket		Anti-Rent ticket	Union ticket	Liberty ticket	
Governor	Washington Hunt	214,614	Horatio Seymour	214,352	Washington Hunt	Horatio Seymour	William L. Chaplin	3,416
Lieutenant Governor	George J. Cornell	210,695	Sanford E. Church	218,009	Sanford E. Church	George J. Cornell	Joseph Plumb	4,226 (Note: "Scattering" votes.)
Canal Commissioner	Ebenezer Blakely	213,894	John C. Mather	215,102	Ebenezer Blakely	John C. Mather		
Inspector of State Prisons	Abner Baker	208,042	William P. Angel	217,980	William P. Angel			
Clerk of the Court of Appeals	Wessell S. Smith	211,029	Charles S. Benton	217,995	Charles S. Benton	Wessell S. Smith		

== See also ==
- New York gubernatorial elections
- New York state elections

== Bibliography ==
=== Primary sources ===
- Greeley, Horace, ed. (1851). The Whig Almanac for 1851. New York: The New York Tribune.
- Valentine, D. T. (1852). Manual of the Corporation of the City of New York. New York: Clerk of the Common Council.

=== Secondary sources ===
- Alexander, DeAlva Stanwood (1906). A Political History of the State of New York. Vol. 2. New York: Henry Holt and Company.
- Holt, Michael F. (1999). The Rise and Fall of the American Whig Party: Jacksonian Politics and the Onset of the Civil War. New York: Oxford University Press.
