= James Angel (businessman) =

James Angel MLC
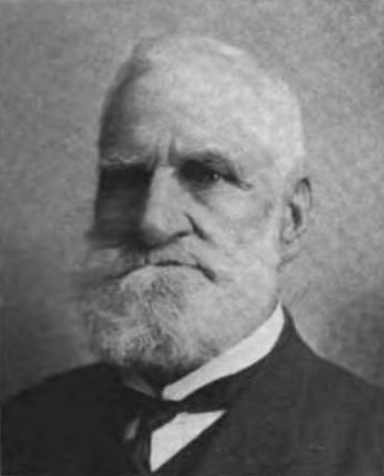
- Angel in 1914

Member of the Legislative Council of Newfoundland
- In office 23 December 1889 – 23 October 1918
- Nominated by: William Whiteway
- Appointed by: Terence O'Brien
- Succeeded by: Jesse Whiteway

Personal details
- Born: 12 January 1838 Halifax, Nova Scotia
- Died: 23 October 1918 (aged 80) St. John's, Newfoundland
- Party: Liberal
- Spouse: Malvina Percy (m. 1868)
- Children: 4
- Occupation: Businessman, metal manufacturer

James Angel (12 January 1838 – 23 October 1918) was an important consumer manufacturer of metal products in Newfoundland. He was also a member of the Legislative Council and a supporter of Premier Sir William Vallance Whiteway.

== Biography ==
James Angel was born in Halifax on 12 January 1838. His father John was a marine engineer, and after helping erect the first general ironworks on Halifax, he brought his family to the seaside city of St. John's in 1859.

=== Foundry and business ===
Early in his life, James worked as an apprentive machinist at the foundry his father managed, although the foundry (owned by Charles Fox Bennett) in November 1856 burned down. The next year, James ran a machine shop with his father, located in the city's west end. They founded the St. John's Iron Foundry in 1867, and James' brother, John Jr. also joined the business in 1867. In 1870, their father retires, and James and John Jr. created St John's Foundry out of the business.

In 1873, the Angel brothers purchased the Victoria Engine and Boiler Works, a small foundry on Water Street. James managed it as a machine shop and depot focusing on emergency ship repairs. In 1882, he bought his brother out on the business. In 1883, he invested in the establishment of St. John's Nail Manufacturing Company. By 1885, he had consolidated the St. John's Nail Manufacturing Company and St John's Foundry into the Newfoundland Consolidated Foundry Company. He managed the company, while among other investors were August William Harvey, James Goodfellow, and James Baird. The Consolidated Foundry was destroyed by a fire on August 22, 1891. It had been insured for half its value. The foundry continued operations for 100 years, with members of the Angel family in senior management positions until it closed in 1982.

In 1894, he moved his plant to the government dry dock, with a contract to operate there, with A. W. Harvey as a silent partner. In 1898, the dry dock was sold to Robert Gillespie Reid, and Angel formed the Angel Engineering and Supply Company. His sons, John E. and Frederick William, joined him in the endeavor. In 1908, the family merged the Victoria works with the Terra Nova foundry. The company, then named Angel Engineering Company, was run by James Angel in terms of overall director. It was sold to the Reid Newfoundland Company in 1912.

=== Politics ===
In 1889, Premier William Vallance Whiteway, whom Angel had supported for espousing the construction of a railroad on the island (the Newfoundland Railway), appointed James Angel to the Legislative Council of Newfoundland. During his term, Angel focused on issues such as industrial development and restricting the sale of alcohol.

In 1906, Angel was a strong supporter of both the Aliens Act and the Chinese Immigration Act, which both aimed to restrict immigration to Newfoundland.

== Personal life ==
On February 24, 1868, he married Malvina Percy in St. John's. They had two sons and two daughters. A Methodist, he was involved in building the George Street Wesleyan Church. He was also a long-time governor of the Methodist College in St John's, and chairman of the Methodist orphanage committee.

Around 1915, he suffered a stroke, and a second stroke in 1917 left him confined to his house. He died at his home in St. John's on 23 October 1918.

== See also ==
- History of Newfoundland and Labrador
