= Senator Angel =

Senator Angel may refer to:

- Denise Harper Angel (born 1953), Kentucky State Senate
- Jan Angel, Washington State Senate
- Wilkes Angel (1817–1889), New York State Senate

== See also ==
- Homer D. Angell (1875–1968), Oregon State Senate
