= Edwin O. Perrin =

American lawyer

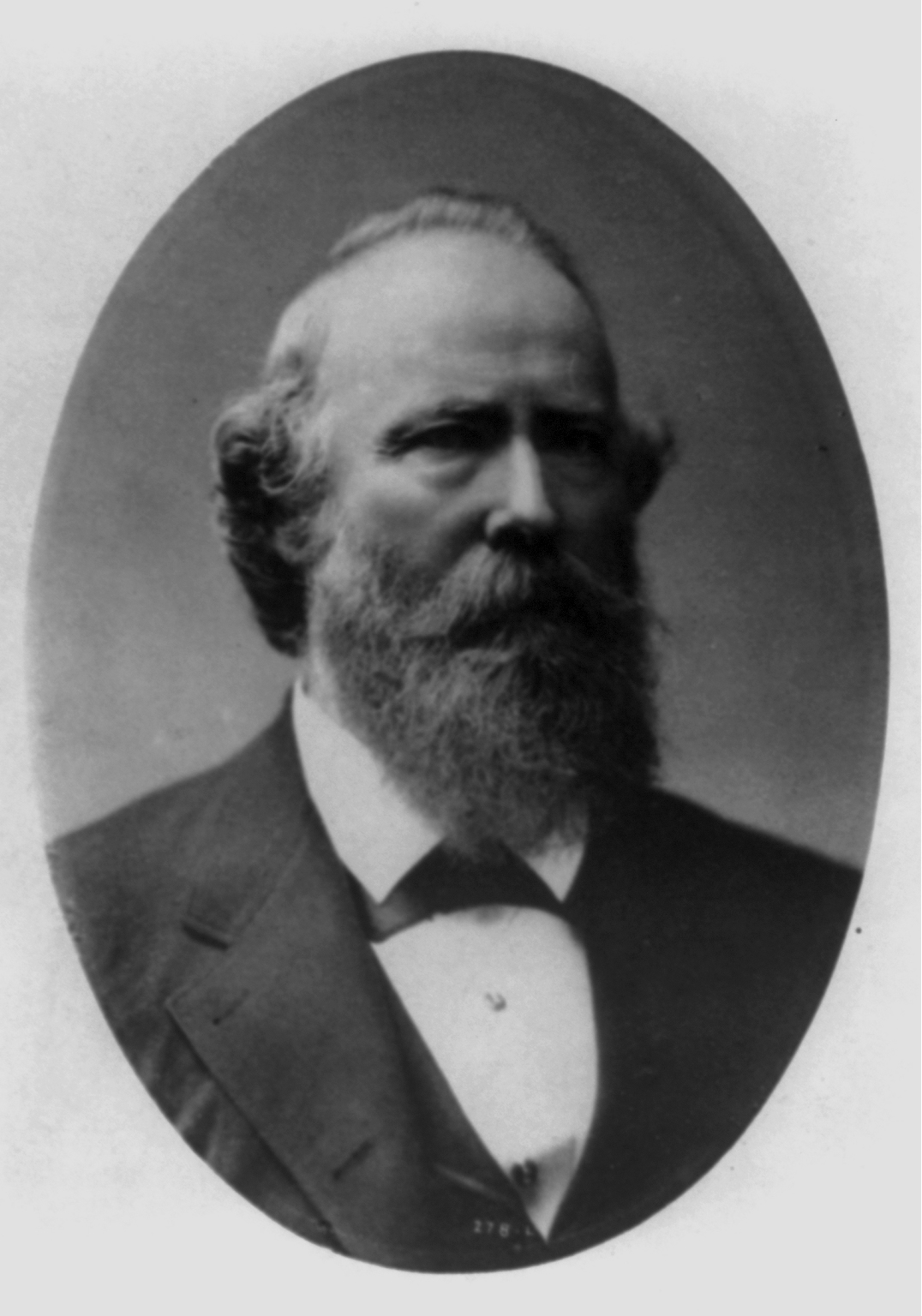
Edwin O. Perrin

Edwin Oscar Perrin (December 3, 1822 Springfield, Ohio – December 19, 1888 New York City) was an American lawyer and politician.

== Life ==
He was the son of Joseph Perrin, a judge and Whig politician. He was educated at the Springfield Academy, and then studied law with Samson Mason. Perrin was admitted to the bar in 1842, and the next year commenced practice at Memphis, Tennessee. From 1845 to 1849, he was Navy Agent and Purser of the Memphis Navy Yard. Afterwards he opened a law firm and in 1854 removed to New York City to open a branch office there.

In 1857, he accompanied Robert J. Walker, who had been appointed Governor of the Kansas Territory, but opposing the Lecompton Constitution returned by the end of the year. Afterwards he ran twice unsuccessfully for the New York State Assembly. In 1861, he was sent by U.S. Secretary of War Simon Cameron on a secret mission to the New Mexico Territory and remained with the command of Kit Carson until 1862.

President Andrew Johnson nominated him for Chief Justice of the Supreme Court of the Utah Territory, but the U.S. Senate rejected the appointment.

In 1865, he was the Democratic candidate for Clerk of the New York Court of Appeals, but was defeated by Republican Patrick H. Jones. In 1868, he ran again and was elected. He was the last statewide elected Clerk, and remained in office by appointment after the re-organization of the Court in 1870 until his death on December 19, 1888.

He died of apoplexy.

== Sources ==
- Dear Old Kit: The Historical Christopher Carson by Harvey Lewis Carter (University of Oklahoma Press, 1990, ISBN 0-8061-2253-6, ISBN 978-0-8061-2253-3, page 233)
- Biographical sketches of John T. Hoffman and Allen C. Beach: the Democratic nominees for governor and lieutenant-governor of the state of New York : also, a record of the events in the lives of Oliver Bascom, David B. McNeil, and Edwin O. Perrin, the other candidates on the same ticket by Hiram Calkins & DeWitt Van Buren (1868; pages 110f)

Legal offices
Preceded by Patrick H. Jones	Clerk of the Court of Appeals; 1869–1889	Succeeded by Gorham Parks
