= History of Sephardic Jews in the Pacific Northwest =

Sephardic Jews were some of the first Jewish immigrants to the Pacific Northwestern United States with the arrival of Turkish and Greek Sephardim in the 20th century.

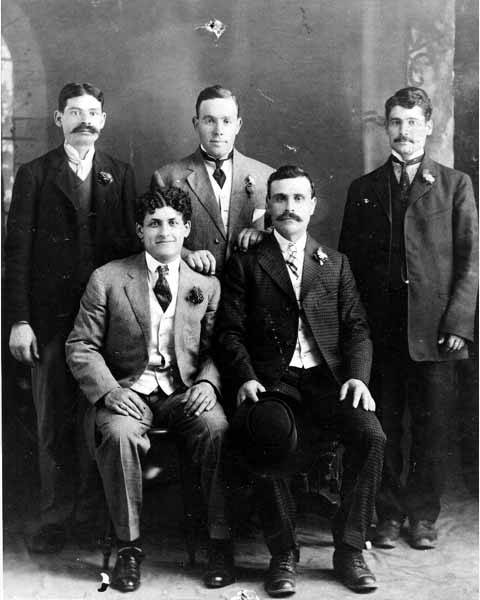
Group portrait of Sephardic pioneers. Seattle, WA (c.1918)

== History ==
The first Sephardic Jews in Seattle, Solomon Calvo (1879–1964) and Jacob (Jack) Policar (d. 1961), came from Marmara, Turkey and Rhodes, Greece. They brought with them their culinary heritage, Ladino language, and distinct Sephardic religious and legal tradition.

Sephardim helped greatly develop the Pike Place Market in Seattle, WA, as they dominated the fishing industry of the city.

== Synagogues ==
=== Washington ===
- Sephardic Bikur Holim (Seattle)
- Congregation Ezra Bessaroth (Seattle)

=== Oregon ===
- Congregation Ahavath Achim (Portland)
- Congregation Beit Yosef (Portland)

== Notable Sephardim from the Pacific Northwest ==
- Rabbi Marc D. Angel - Rabbi emeritus of Congregation Shearith Israel in New York.
- Nissim Black - American-Israeli Hasidic rapper.
