= James B. McKean =

American politician

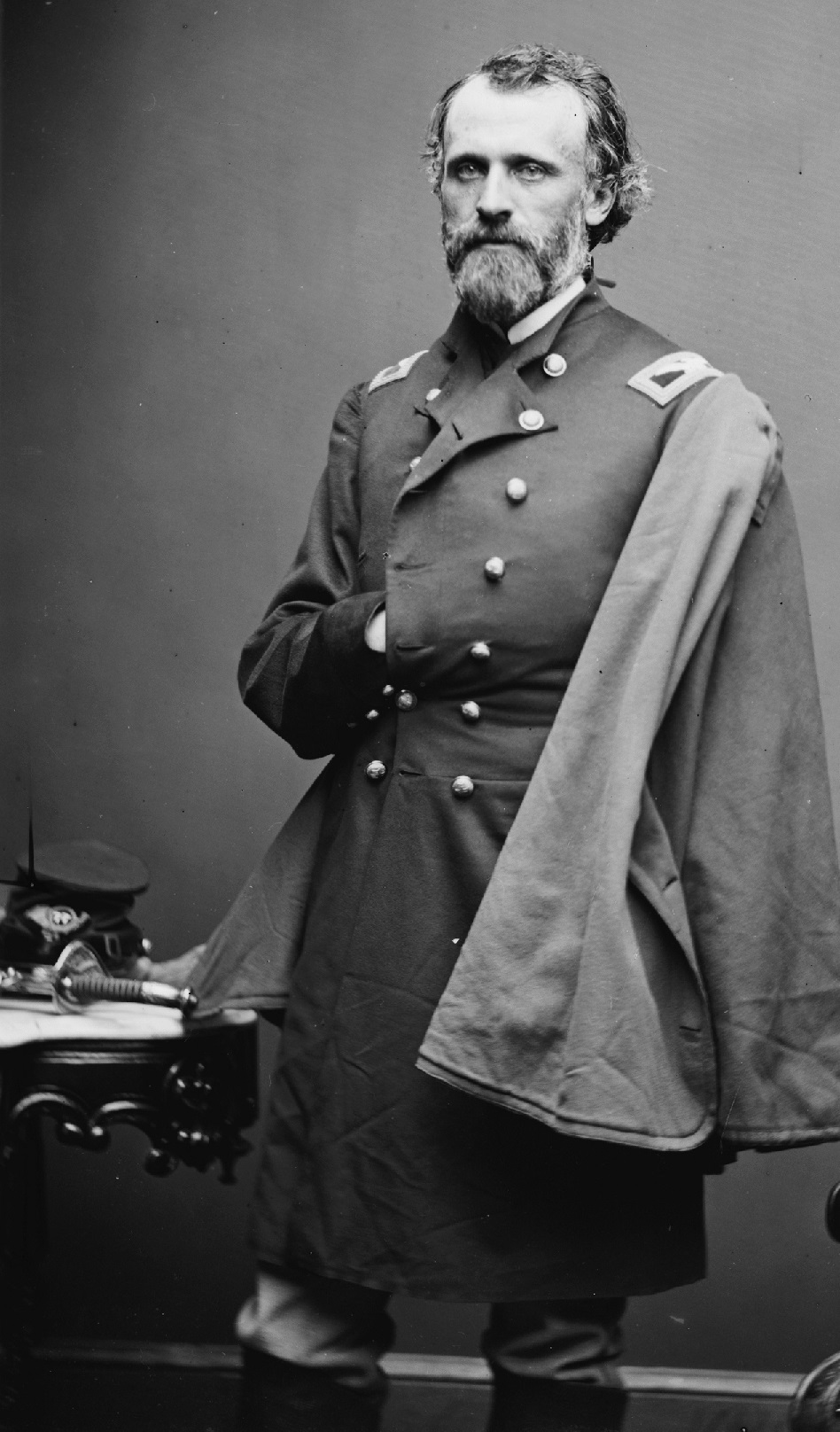
James Bedell McKean, Colonel, 77th New York Infantry Regiment.

James Bedell McKean (August 5, 1821 – January 5, 1879) was an American politician from New York and Utah.

== Biography ==
McKean was born August 5, 1821, in Hoosick, New York.

He was one of the professors in Jonesville Academy for some time. He was the Superintendent of the Common Schools of Halfmoon, New York in 1842.

McKean was elected colonel of the One Hundred and Forty-fourth Regiment, New York State Militia, in 1844. Then he studied law, was admitted to the bar in 1849, and commenced practice in Ballston Spa, New York. He moved to Saratoga Springs, New York in 1851. He was First Judge of the Saratoga County Court from 1855 to 1858.

McKean was elected as a Republican to the 36th and 37th United States Congresses, and served from March 4, 1859, to March 3, 1863. He was Chairman of the Committee on Expenditures in the Department of State.

During the American Civil War, he organized the 77th New York Volunteer Infantry, in 1861 and served as colonel of the regiment until July 27, 1863, when he resigned his commission due to poor health.

He was appointed treaty commissioner to Honduras in 1865. In 1867, he ran for Secretary of State of New York on the Republican ticket, but was defeated by Democrat Homer Augustus Nelson.

He was appointed Chief Justice of the Superior Court of the Utah Territory by President Ulysses S. Grant in 1870 and served until 1875. In Utah history, McKean is famous for intensifying the federal government's efforts to abolish polygamy, which some members of the Church of Jesus Christ of Latter-day Saints practiced as a religious doctrine until 1890. Evidence suggests McKean believed it was his moral and religious duty to wage legal war against the practice and that questionable tactics were justified if they helped him achieve his goal. Shortly after his appointment, McKean wrote to a friend, "[T]he mission which God has called me to perform in Utah, is as much above the duties of other courts and judges as the heavens are above the earth, and whenever or wherever I may find the Local or Federal laws obstructing or interfering therewith, by God's blessings I shall trample them under my feet."

During McKean's tenure in Utah, Mormon leader Brigham Young was indicted for "lascivious cohabitation," the federal government's strongest case against polygamy at that time. To ensure Young's and other Mormons' convictions, McKean essentially banned members of the LDS Church from serving on juries, a decision which the Supreme Court of the United States later ruled against. Consequently, all charges against Young at that time were quashed.

McKean died January 5, 1879, in Salt Lake City, Utah. He was interred in Mount Olivet Cemetery in Salt Lake City.

Samuel McKean was his uncle.

U.S. House of Representatives
Preceded by Edward Dodd	Member of the U.S. House of Representatives from New York's 15th congressional district 1859–1863	Succeeded by John A. Griswold
