= 77th New York Infantry Regiment =

- Active: November 22, 1861 to June 27, 1865
- Country: United States
- Allegiance: Union
- Branch: Infantry
- Nickname(s): Bemis Heights Regiment or Saratoga Regiment
- Engagements: Siege of Yorktown; Battle of Williamsburg; Seven Days Battles; Battle of Garnett's & Golding's Farm; Battle of Savage's Station; Battle of White Oak Swamp; Battle of Malvern Hill; Battle of South Mountain; Battle of Antietam; Battle of Fredericksburg; Battle of Chancellorsville; Battle of Gettysburg; Bristoe Campaign; Mine Run Campaign; Battle of the Wilderness; Battle of Spotsylvania Court House; Battle of North Anna; Battle of Totopotomoy Creek; Battle of Cold Harbor; Siege of Petersburg; Battle of Fort Stevens; Third Battle of Winchester; Battle of Fisher's Hill; Battle of Cedar Creek; Appomattox Campaign; Third Battle of Petersburg; Battle of Sailor's Creek; Battle of Appomattox Court House

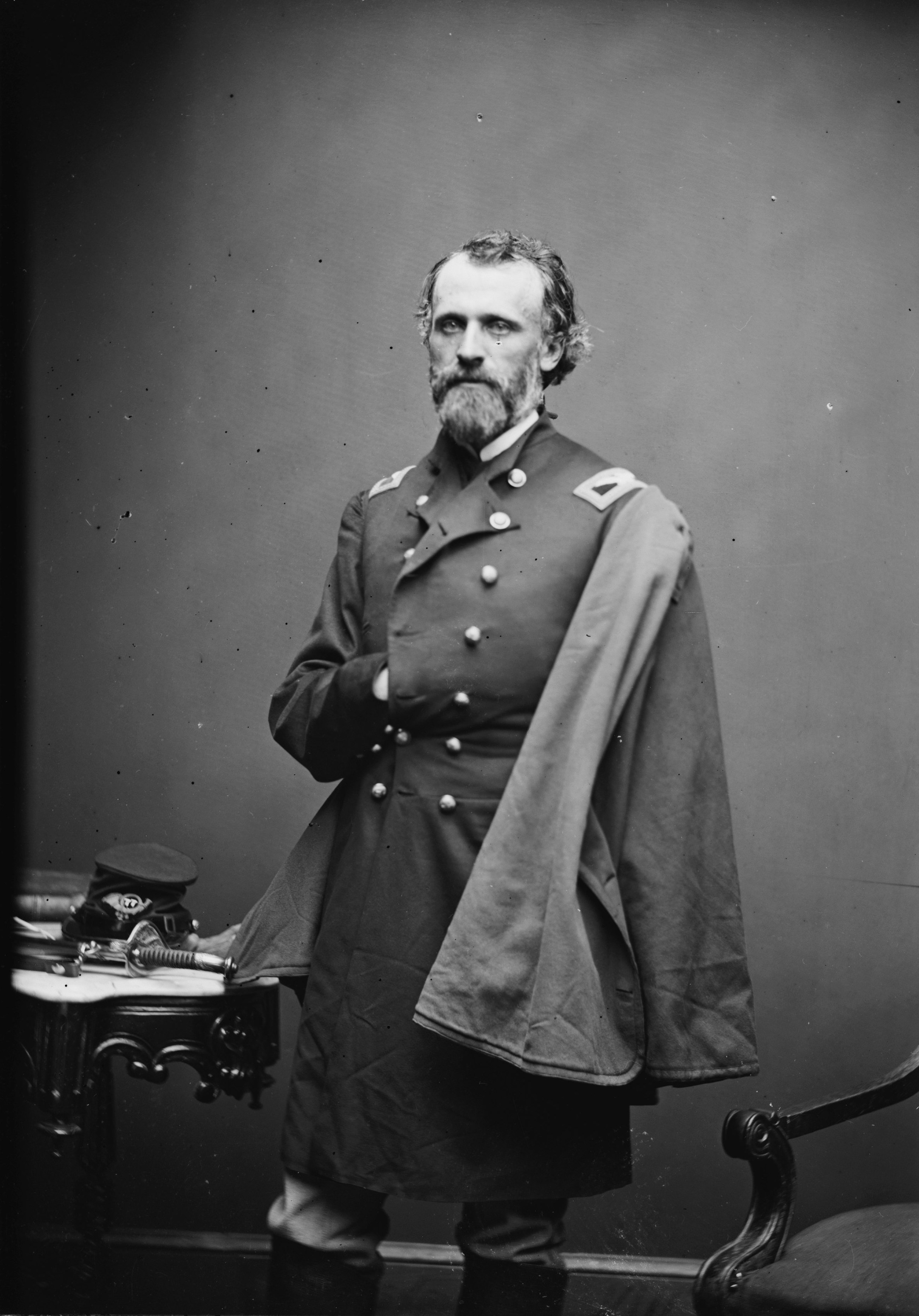
:Col. James B. McKean

The 77th New York Infantry Regiment ("Bemis Heights Regiment" or "Saratoga Regiment") was an infantry regiment in the Union Army during the American Civil War.

== Service ==
The 77th New York Infantry was organized at Saratoga Springs, New York, November 22, 1861, and mustered on November 23, 1861, for three years' service under the command of Colonel James B. McKean.

The regiment was attached to 3rd Brigade, Casey's Division, Army of the Potomac, to March 1862. 3rd Brigade, 2nd Division, IV Corps, Army of the Potomac, to May 1862. 3rd Brigade, 2nd Division, VI Corps, Army of the Potomac, and Army of the Shenandoah, to June 1865.

The 77th New York Infantry mustered out June 27, 1865.

== Detailed service ==
Left New York for Washington, D.C., November 28, 1861. Duty in the defenses of Washington, D.C., until March 1862. Advance on Manassas, Va., March 10. Ordered to the Virginia Peninsula March 22. Near Lee's Mills April 5. Siege of Yorktown April 5-May 4. Lee's Mills April 16. Battle of Williamsburg May 5. Mechanicsville May 23–24 and June 24. Seven Days Battles before Richmond June 25-July 1. Garnett's Farm June 27. Garnett's and Golding's Farms June 28. Savage's Station June 29. White Oak Swamp and Glendale June 30. Malvern Hill July 1. At Harrison's Landing until August 16. Movement to Fort Monroe, then to Centreville, August 16–28. In works at Centreville August 28–31. Assist in checking Pope's rout at Bull Run August 30, and cover retreat to Fairfax Court House September 1. Maryland Campaign September 6–22. Crampton's Pass, South Mountain, September 14. Battle of Antietam September 16–17. Duty in Maryland until October 29. Movement to Falmouth, Va., October 29-November 19. Union November 2–3. Battle of Fredericksburg December 12–15. At Falmouth until April 27, 1863. "Mud March" January 20–24. Chancellorsville Campaign April 27-May 6. Operations about Franklin's Crossing April 29-May 2. Battle of Maryes Heights, Fredericksburg, May 3. Salem Heights May 3–4. Banks' Ford May 4. Deep Run Ravine June 5–13. Battle of Gettysburg July 2–4. Pursuit of Lee July 5–24. Duty on line of the Rappahannock until October. Bristoe Campaign October 9–22. Advance to line of the Rappahannock November 7–8. Rappahannock Station November 7. Mine Run Campaign November 26-December 2. Duty near Brandy Station until May 1864. Demonstration on the Rapidan February 6–7. Campaign from the Rapidan to the James River May 3-June 15. Battle of the Wilderness May 5–7. Spotsylvania May 8–12. Spotsylvania Court House May 12–21. Assault on the Salient or "Bloody Angle" May 12. North Anna River May 23–26. On line of the Pamunkey May 26–28. Totopotomoy May 28–31. Cold Harbor June 1–12. Before Petersburg June 17–18. Siege of Petersburg June 17 to July 9. Jerusalem Plank Road, Weldon Railroad, June 22–23. Moved to Washington, D.C., July 9–11. Repulse of Early's attack on Fort Stevens and the northern defenses of Washington July 11–12. Sheridan's Shenandoah Valley Campaign August 7-November 28. Gilbert's Ford, Opequan Creek, September 13. Battle of Winchester September 19. Fisher's Hill September 22. Battle of Cedar Creek October 19. Duty in the Shenandoah Valley until December. Moved to Washington, D.C., then to Petersburg, Va., December 13–16. Siege of Petersburg December 16, 1864 to April 2, 1865. Fort Fisher, Petersburg, March 25, 1865. Appomattox Campaign March 28-April 9. Assault on and fall of Petersburg April 2. Sailor's Creek April 6. Appomattox Court House April 9. Surrender of Lee and his army. March to Danville April 23–27, and duty there until May 24. March to Richmond, Va., then to Washington, D.C., May 24-June 3. Corps review June 8.

== Casualties ==
The regiment lost a total of 273 men during service; 9 officers and 87 enlisted men killed or mortally wounded, 2 officers and 175 enlisted men died of disease.

== Commanders ==
- Colonel James B. McKean - resigned July 23, 1863 due to poor health
- Colonel Winsor B. French
- Colonel David J. Caw
- Captain Nathan S. Babcock - commanded at the Battle of Antietam

== Statues ==
The 77th New York Volunteer Infantry are honored by three statues of note. The first is located on Powers Hill in Gettysburg. The second statue is located in Congress Park in Saratoga Springs, New York. Following the murder of George Floyd, the statue was vandalized by persons unknown. The third statue is located in Ballston Spa, New York.

== See also ==
- List of New York Civil War regiments
- New York in the Civil War
