= Edward Dodd =

American politician

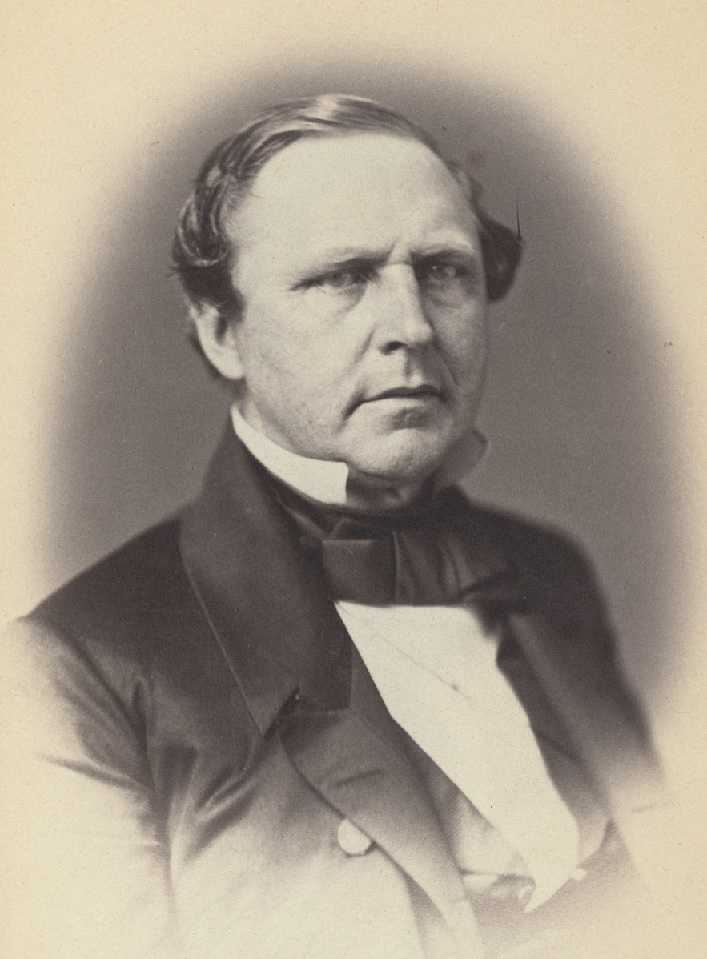

United States Marshal for the northern district of New York
- In office 1863–1869

Chairman of the Committee on District of Columbia
- In office 1855–1857

Member of the U.S. House of Representatives from New York's 15th district
- In office March 4, 1855 – March 3, 1859
- Preceded by: Charles Hughes
- Succeeded by: James B. McKean

Personal details
- Born: August 25, 1805 Salem, New York, U.S.
- Died: March 1, 1891 (aged 85) Argyle, New York, U.S.
- Resting place: Prospect Hill Cemetery
- Party: Whig; Republican

Edward Dodd (August 25, 1805 – March 1, 1891) was a U.S. representative from New York.

== Early life ==
Edward Dodd was born in Salem, New York, on August 25, 1805. He attended the public schools.

== Career ==
He engaged in mercantile pursuits. He moved to Argyle, New York, in 1835. He served as county clerk of Washington County from 1835 to 1844. He served as delegate to the State constitutional convention in 1846.

Dodd was elected as a Whig candidate to the Thirty-fourth Congress, and re-elected as a Republican to the Thirty-fifth Congress (March 4, 1855 – March 3, 1859). He served as chairman of the Committee on District of Columbia (Thirty-fourth Congress).

He served as the United States marshal for the northern district of New York from April 1863 to April 1869. He was editor of the County Post for thirty years.

He was a Trustee of the Argyle Academy for fifty-one years. He served as president of the village of Argyle for eight years. He served as member of the Republican State committee for many years.

== Death ==
He died in Argyle, New York, March 1, 1891. He was interred in Prospect Hill Cemetery.

U.S. House of Representatives
Preceded by Charles Hughes	Member of the U.S. House of Representatives from New York's 15th congressional district 1855–1859	Succeeded by James B. McKean
