= Russell F. Hicks =

American lawyer and politician

Russell Frank Hicks (January 1, 1820 in Smithfield, Madison County, New York – August 23, 1869 in Cicero, Onondaga County, New York) was an American lawyer and politician from New York.

== Life ==
He entered Cazenovia Seminary in 1827. He married Susan Hammond, of Dansville, Livingston County, New York, and their children were Hammond Hicks, John Hicks and Katharine Hicks. His widow later married Amariah Hammond Bradner (1818-1888).

Hicks was Deputy Clerk of the New York Court of Appeals under Benjamin F. Harwood. After Harwood's death, he became Clerk until the end of the year, and in November 1856, he was elected on the Republican ticket to succeed himself.

== Sources ==
- The New York Civil List compiled by Franklin Benjamin Hough (page 348; Weed, Parsons and Co., 1858)
- The American Almanac and Repository of Useful Knowledge for 1856 (Crosby, Nichols & Co, Boston, 1855; page 264)
- Van Deventer Genealogy
- Bradner genealogy [inverting erroneously Susan's marriages]
- Cazenovia Seminary records
- The Connecticut Nutmegger edited by the Connecticut Society of Genealogists (1984)

Legal offices
Preceded by Benjamin F. Harwood	Clerk of the Court of Appeals; 1856–1859	Succeeded by Charles Hughes
