= Charles Hughes (congressman) =

American politician

Charles Hughes (February 27, 1822 – August 10, 1887) was an American lawyer and politician from New York. He served one term in the U.S. House of Representatives from 1853 to 1855.

== Biography ==
Hughes was born in New Orleans, Louisiana. He studied law, was admitted to the bar, and commenced practice in Sandy Hill.

=== Congress ===
He was elected as a Democrat to the 33rd United States Congress, holding office from March 4, 1853, to March 3, 1855.

=== Later career ===
Hughes was Clerk of the New York Court of Appeals from 1860 to 1862, elected at the 1859 New York state election, on the Republican and American tickets, but defeated for re-election at the 1862 New York state election on the Union ticket.

He also served as provost marshal for the sixteenth district of New York, was a member of the Governor’s staff and Judge Advocate General of the New York State Militia. He was a member of the New York State Senate (12th D.) in 1878 and 1879.

=== Death ===
He died in Sandy Hill, Washington County, New York, and was buried at the Union Cemetery, between Fort Edward and Sandy Hill.

U.S. House of Representatives
Preceded by Joseph Russell	Member of the U.S. House of Representatives from New York's 15th congressional district 1853–1855	Succeeded by Edward Dodd
Legal offices
Preceded by Russell F. Hicks	Clerk of the Court of Appeals; 1860–1862	Succeeded by Frederick A. Tallmadge
New York State Senate
Preceded by Thomas Coleman	New York State Senate; 12th District; 1878–1879	Succeeded by William H. Robertson
