= Marc D. Angel =

American rabbi and author (born 1945)

Rabbi Marc D. Angel
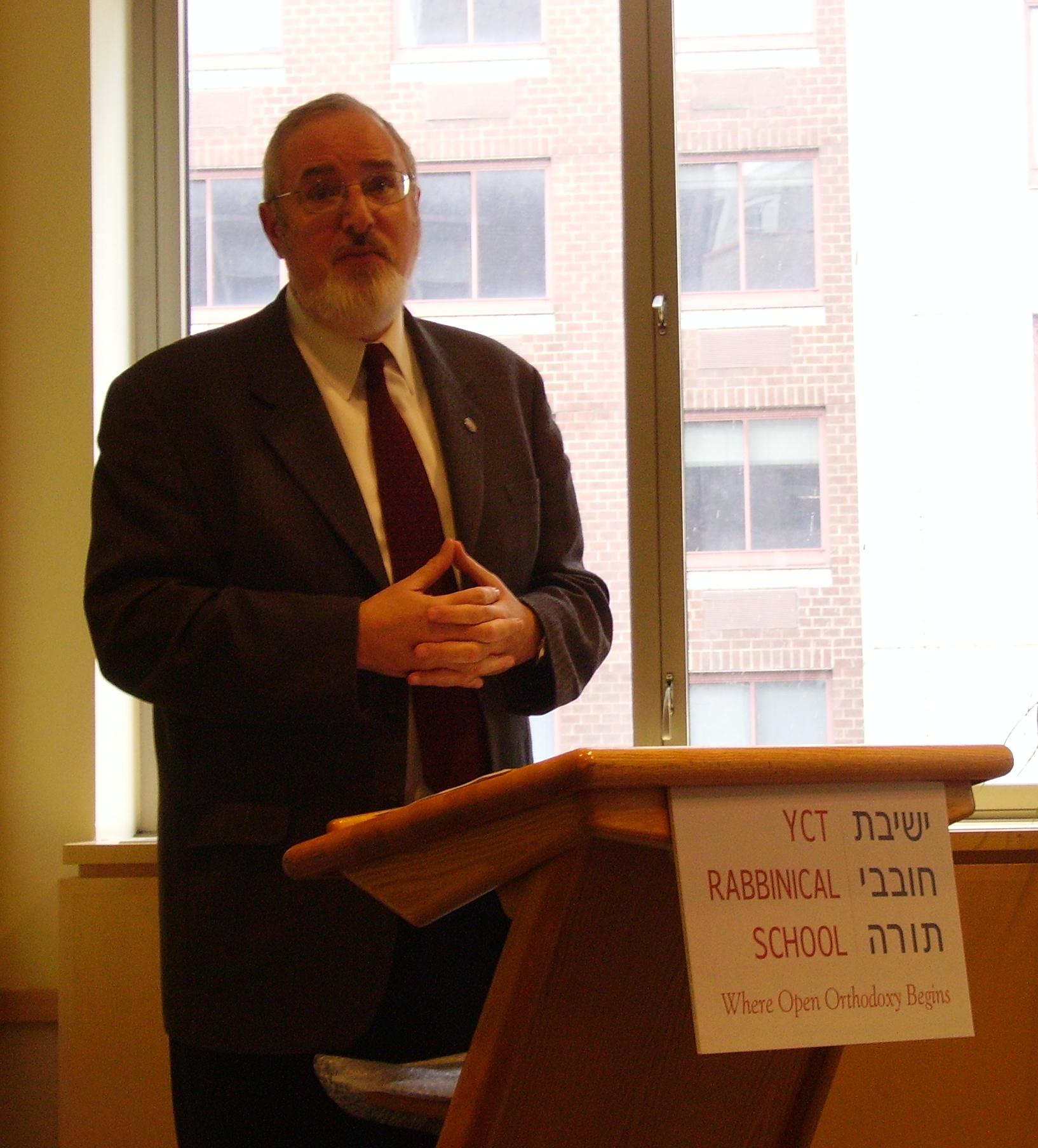
- Rabbi Angel speaking

Personal life
- Born: July 1945 (age 81) Seattle, Washington
- Spouse: Gilda (m. 1967; died 2025)
- Children: 3 including Hayyim Angel
- Education: Yeshiva University (B.A., M.S., Ph.D., Th.D., Semikhah); City College of New York (M.A.)
- Occupation: Rabbi and author

Religious life
- Religion: Judaism
- Denomination: Sephardic

Jewish leader
- Synagogue: Congregation Shearith Israel
- Semikhah: RIETS

Marc D. Angel (born July 1945) is a Sephardic rabbi and author. He is rabbi emeritus of Congregation Shearith Israel, the Spanish and Portuguese Synagogue in New York City, where he began working in 1969.

== Biography ==
Born into Seattle's Sephardic Jewish community, his ancestors are Ottoman Sephardim from Turkey and Rhodes, and he grew up in a Ladino-speaking home.

He received his B.A., M.S., Ph.D., Th.D. honoris causa, and semikhah (rabbinical ordination) from Yeshiva University; he also has an M.A. in English literature from the City College of New York. He has received the Bernard Revel Award in Religion and Religious Education. He was president of the Rabbinical Council of America (RCA), and a member of the editorial board of its journal, Tradition.

In 2007, he established the Institute for Jewish Ideas and Ideals. He directs the Institute and edits its journal, Conversations, which appears three times per year.

He has written several books and articles that have taken issue with and challenged extreme Orthodox views and the Rabbinate.

== Works ==
- A Sephardic Haggadah: Translation and Commentary (Hoboken, New Jersey, 1988)
- The Jews of Rhodes, The History of a Sephardic Community (New York, 1978)
- La America: The Sephardic Experience in the United States (Philadelphia, 1982)
- The Rhythms of Jewish Living: A Sephardic Approach (New York, 1986)
- The Orphaned Adult: Confronting the Death of a Parent (1987)
- Voices in Exile: A Study in Sephardic Intellectual History (1991)
- The Essential Pele Yoetz: an Encyclopedia of Ethical Jewish Living (1991)
- Loving Truth and Peace: The Grand Religious Worldview of Rabbi Benzion Uziel (1999)
- Remnant of Israel: A Portrait of America's First Jewish Congregation (2004)
- Losing the Rat Race, Winning at Life (2005)
- Choosing to be Jewish: The Orthodox Road to Conversion (2005)
- Rabbi Hayim David HaLevi: Gentle Scholar and Courageous Thinker (2006)
- The Search Committee: A Novel (2008)
- "Conversion to Judaism: Halakha, Hashkafa, and Historic Challenge", Hakirah, vol. 8 (Brooklyn, 2008)
- Maimonides, Spinoza and Us: Toward an Intellectually Vibrant Judaism (2009)
- Maimonides: Essential Teachings on Jewish Faith and Ethics (2012)
- Reclaiming Orthodox Judaism, a collection of essays, published as issue 12 of Conversations, the journal of the Institute for Jewish Ideas and Ideals
- Angel for Shabbat, volumes 1 and 2, published by the Institute for Jewish Ideas and Ideals (2010 and 2013)

== Awards ==
- 1988: National Jewish Book Award in the Jewish Thought category for The Orphaned Adult: Confronting the Death of a Parent

== Family ==
In a 2009 interview he stated that he and his wife Gilda Angel "have three children and six grandchildren". He is the father of Rabbi Hayyim Angel. His wife Gilda passed away on June 3, 2025.

== Institute for Jewish Ideas and Ideals ==
In October 2007, Angel founded the Institute for Jewish Ideas and Ideals is a New York-based non-profit organization committed to advancing a culturally diverse and intellectually rational Jewish Orthodoxy. The Institute disseminates its particular vision through the publication of articles, and books as well as the hosting and promotion of lectures. Hayyim Angel, Angel's son, is National Scholar of the institute.

== See also ==
- Yeshivat Chovevei Torah
- History of Sephardic Jews in the Pacific Northwest
- Spanish-Portuguese Jews in the United States
