= Benjamin F. Harwood =

American lawyer and politician

Benjamin F. Harwood (c. 1818 – March 30, 1856 in Albany, New York) was an American lawyer and politician from New York.

== Life ==
He lived in Dansville, Livingston County, New York.

In 1853, he was elected on the Whig ticket Clerk of the New York Court of Appeals, being in office from 1854 until his death.

He died a few days after the Court of Appeals declared Governor Myron H. Clark's prohibition law to be void. Harwood suffered from alcoholism himself, and felt the decision "to be his death warrant."

== Sources ==
- The Annals of Albany by Joel Munsell (page 333)
- The New York Civil List compiled by Franklin Benjamin Hough (page 348; Weed, Parsons and Co., 1858)
- Report of the Executive Committee of the American Temperance Union (1856; page 16)

Legal offices
Preceded by Charles S. Benton	Clerk of the Court of Appeals; 1854–1856	Succeeded by Russell F. Hicks
