= Adam Storing =

American politician

Adam Storing was an American politician from New York.

== Life ==
He was a member of the New York State Assembly (Chenango Co.) in 1842. In 1843, he was appointed as an associate judge of the Chenango County Court.

He contested the election of Ebenezer Blakely to the New York State Senate (18th D.), and was seated on March 14, 1854. He remained in the Senate for the remainder of the term, sitting in the 77th and 78th New York State Legislatures.

He was Postmaster of German, New York.

== Sources ==
- The New York Civil List compiled by Franklin Benjamin Hough (pages 137, 146, 226 and 307; Weed, Parsons and Co., 1858)
- List of Post Offices in the United States (1857; pg. 56)
- Documents of the State Senate (77th Session) (1854; pg. 53ff; No. 9 "Petition of Adam Storing, of Chenango County, claiming a seat as Senator in place of Ebenezer Blakeley")

New York State Senate
Preceded by Ebenezer Blakely	New York State Senate; 18th District; 1854–1855	Succeeded by Addison M. Smith
