= Eliezer Papo =

Ottoman rabbi (1785–1828)

Rabbi Eliezer Papo
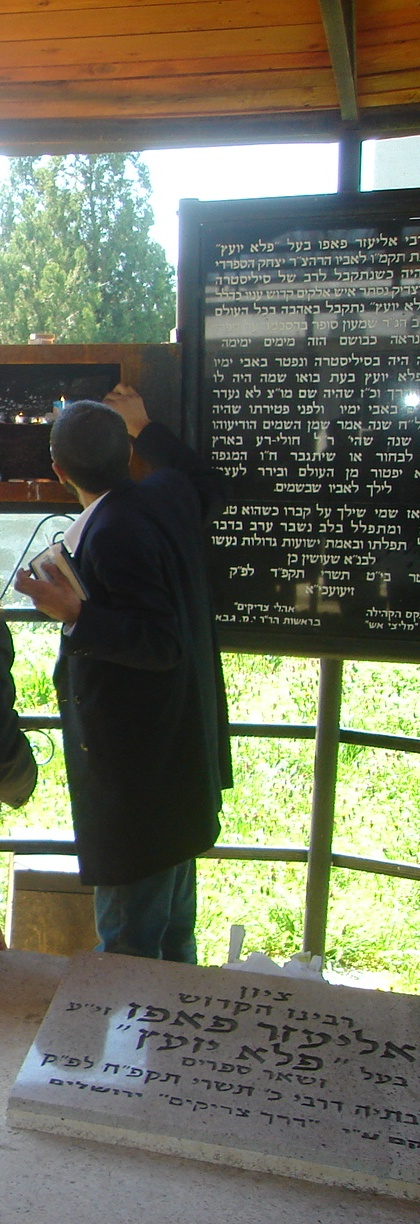
- The gravestone of Rabbi Eliezer Papo in Silistra, Bulgaria

Personal life
- Born: 1785 Saraybosna, Bosnia Eyalet, Ottoman Empire
- Died: 11 October 1828 (aged 42–43) Silistra, Ottoman Empire
- Notable work(s): Pele Yoetz, Eleph Hamagen, Orot Eilim, Chesed L'Alaphim, Yaalzu Chasidim, Chodesh HaAviv, Beit Tefillah
- Known for: Author of Pele Yoetz
- Occupation: Rabbi

Religious life
- Religion: Judaism

Senior posting
- Post: Rabbi of Silistra

Rabbi Eliezer Papo (1785–1828) was the rabbi of the community of Silistra in the Ottoman Empire (modern-day Bulgaria). He is famous for writing the Pele Yoetz, a work of musar (ethical) literature which gives advice on how to behave as a Jew in many aspects of life.

He was born in Saraybosna in the Bosnia Eyalet of the Ottoman Empire (today Sarajevo, Bosnia). He moved at the age of 27 to Bulgaria, where he died on 11 October 1828.

He authored the Pele Yoetz, his most famous work, as well as Eleph Hamagen, Orot Eilim, Chesed L'Alaphim (on the Orach Chaim), Yaalzu Chasidim (on Sefer Chasidim), and Chodesh HaAviv.

One of his noted works is Beit Tefillah, which is filled with many different prayers for specific situations, including one for the welfare of the Jewish people. A Ladino edition was published in the 1860s, and a Hebrew version was printed in Jerusalem in 1968 (There were some additional, newer printings since).

His grave is up to the present day a focus of pilgrimage by observant Jews, some of whom fly especially from Israel and even from Latin America to Bulgaria for that purpose.
