= Wesley Bailey =

American newspaper editor (1808–1889)

Wesley Bailey (1808 – February 26, 1889) was an American newspaper editor and politician from New York.

== Life ==
He learned the printer's trade, and was a Minister of the Reformed Methodist Church. He also taught school in DeWitt, New York. In 1833, he married Eunice Kinne (1807–1860), and they had six children. They lived in High Bridge, a hamlet in the Town of Manlius.

He edited from 1840 to 1842 the Fayetteville Luminary and Reformed Methodist Iintelligencer (Methodist Reformer after September 23, 1841), from 1842 to 1849 the Liberty Press, the paper of the Liberty Party, and from 1849 to 1852 the Utica Teetotaller.

In September 1854, he was a delegate to the Temperance state convention which nominated Myron H. Clark for Governor. In 1855, he was nominated by the Republicans for Inspector of State Prisons but was defeated by the American Party candidate William A. Russell. In 1856, he ran again and this time was elected, being in office from 1857 to 1859.

In 1860, he removed to Decorah, Iowa, and published there the Decorah Republic, from 1866 on the Decorah Republican, until 1869, when he transferred the paper to his sons Ansel K. Bailey (d. 1909) and Alvan Stewart Bailey.

His oldest son, Elijah Prentice Bailey (b. 1834), worked for the Utica Daily Observer from 1853 on, later became its sole editor and owner, and was twice Postmaster of Utica.

== Sources ==
- The New York Civil List compiled by Franklin Benjamin Hough (page 46; Weed, Parsons and Co., 1858)
- New York State Temperance Convention in NYT on September 28, 1854
- Temperance Ratification Meeting at Auburn in NYT on September 29, 1854
- THE REPUBLICANS in NYT on October 10, 1855, with Bailey's letter of acceptance
- He Pasa Ekklesia: An Original History of the Religious Denominations at Present Existing in the United States by Israel Daniel Rupp (J.Y. Humphreys, 1844; pages 466ff: "REFORMED METHODIST CHURCH" by Rev. Wesley Bailey, Utica)
- Newspaper history - "Teetotaller"
- Oneida County newspaper history - "Liberty Press"
- Past and Present of Winneshiek County, Iowa (1913)
- Kinne-Bailey genealogy, at RootsWeb [gives Vermont as birthplace]
- History and Genealogy of a Branch of the Family of Kinne by Emerson Kinne (Higginson Book Co., 1881) [gives Vermont as birthplace]
- Lamb's Biographical Dictionary of the United States by John Howard Brown (James H. Lamb Co., 1900) [gives Fayetteville, New York as birthplace]
