= Ebenezer Blakely =

American politician

Ebenezer Blakely (September 25, 1806 – August 21, 1889) was an American lawyer and politician from New York.

== Life ==
He was a member of the New York State Assembly (Otsego Co.) in 1846.

At the New York state election, 1850, he ran on the Whig and Anti-Rent tickets for Canal Commissioner, but was defeated by Democrat John C. Mather.

Blakely was declared elected to the New York State Senate (18th D.), and took his seat at the opening of the 77th New York State Legislature, but his election was contested by Democrat Adam Storing. Blakely resigned his seat on March 14, 1854, acknowledging that Storing's claim was justified, and Storing was seated.

Blakely was a presidential elector in 1864, voting for Abraham Lincoln and Andrew Johnson. In 1865, Blakely was appointed a State Assessor.

He married Lavernia C. Bundy (1819–1886), and their son Tilley Blakely (1860–1938) was appointed as District Attorney of Otsego County in 1896.

He and his wife were buried at the Evergreen Cemetery in Otego.

== Sources ==
- The New York Civil List compiled by Franklin Benjamin Hough (pages 137f, 232 and 259; Weed, Parsons and Co., 1858)
- Documents of the State Senate (77th Session) (1854; pg. 53ff; No. 9 "Petition of Adam Storing, of Chenango County, claiming a seat as Senator in place of Ebenezer Blakeley")
- The New York Civil List compiled by Franklin Benjamin Hough, Stephen C. Hutchins and Edgar Albert Werner (1867; page 580)
- Manual for the Use of the Legislature (1866; pg. 298)
- The New York Annual Register (1835; pg. 390)
- FROM ALBANY;...Resignation of a Senator... in NYT on March 16, 1854
- Appointments by the Governor in NYT on September 29, 1896

New York State Senate
Preceded by Harmon Bennett	New York State Senate; 18th District; 1854	Succeeded by Adam Storing
