= Samuel Chase (New York politician) =

American politician

Member of the House of Representatives from New York's 13th District
- In office March 4, 1827 – March 3, 1829
- Preceded by: William G. Angel
- Succeeded by: William G. Angel

District attorney of Otsego County
- In office 1821–1829

Personal details
- Born: 1789 Cooperstown, New York, US
- Died: August 3, 1838 (aged 48–49) Richfield, New York, US
- Party: Adams
- Spouse: Mary Frances Whetcroft
- Children: Frank
- Occupation: lawyer

Samuel Chase (1789—August 3, 1838) was an American lawyer from Otsego County, New York. He represented New York in the U.S. House for one term.

== Biography ==
Chase was born in Cooperstown, New York in 1789. He was educated locally, studied law, and was admitted to the bar in 1815. In 1818, he studied at the Litchfield Law School.

In addition to practicing law in Richfield, Chase was active in other business ventures; he was part-owner of a hotel and tavern, and was one of the original incorporators of the Otsego County Bank. He held various positions in local and county government, including postmaster of Richfield and the judicial position of Master in Chancery. From 1821 to 1829 he was District Attorney of Otsego County.

In 1826, Chase was elected to the 20th Congress as a supporter of John Quincy Adams. He served one term, 1827 to 1829, after which he returned to his Otsego County law practice.

== Death and burial ==
Chase died in Richfield on August 3, 1838, and was buried at Lakeview Cemetery in Richfield. Chase's grave marker indicates that he died in 1839; this is clearly in error, since contemporary newspaper accounts and the probate process for his estate give his year of death as 1838.

== Family ==
In 1828, Chase married in Washington, DC Mary Frances Whetcroft, the daughter of William Whetcroft and Anne Winchester Whetcroft of Annapolis, Maryland. After Chase's death, Mary Whetcroft married Philetus Allen of Springville.

Chase's children included Frank Chase (September 18, 1838—January 14, 1902), who was born the month following Chase's death. Frank Chase was a graduate of Albany Law School, and resided in Concord and Springville. In addition to practicing law, he was involved in local politics and government, including service as Springville's town supervisor and a justice of the peace.

== Sources ==
=== Books ===
- Barber, Gertrude Audrey (2008) [1993]. A Collection of Abstracts from Otsego County, New York, Newspaper Obituaries, 1808-1875. Westminster, MD: Heritage Books. ISBN 978-1-58549-798-0.
- Hurd, D. Hamilton (1878). History of Otsego County, New York, 1740-1878. Philadelphia, PA: Everts & Fariss.
- New York State Assembly (1824). Journal of the Assembly of the State of New York, 47th Session. Albany, NY: Leake and Croswell.
- Paxton, William McClung (1885). The Marshall Family: Or A Genealogical Chart of the Descendants of John Marshall and Elizabeth Markham. Cincinnati, OH: Robert Clarke & Co.
- Ward, Henry Alson (1898). Annals of Richfield. Utica, NY: Fierstine Printing House.
- White, Truman C. (1898). Our County and Its People: A Descriptive Work on Erie County, New York. Vol. II. Boston, MA: Boston History Company.
- Woodruff, George M.; Howe, Archibald M. (1900). The Litchfield Law School, 1784-1833. Litchfield, CT: Litchfield Enquirer.

=== Newspapers ===
- "Civil & Military Commissions". Otsego Herald. Cooperstown, NY. August 17, 1815.
- "Wedding Announcement, Hon. Samuel Chase and Mary Frances Whetcroft". U.S. Newspaper Extractions from the Northeast, 1704-1930: Massachusetts; Columbian Centinel; Marriage, Caban-Dyson. Provo, UT: Ancestry.com LLC. July 4, 1828. p. 686.
- "Richfield: Death Notice, Frank Chase" (PDF). Otsego Farmer. Otsego, NY. January 24, 1902.

=== Internet ===
- "New York, Wills and Probate Records, 1659-1999, Entry for Samuel Chase". Ancestry.com. Provo, UT: Ancestry.com, LLC. August 20, 1838.

U.S. House of Representatives
Preceded by William G. Angel	Member of the U.S. House of Representatives from New York's 13th congressional district March 4, 1827 – March 3, 1829	Succeeded by William G. Angel
