= James Angell =

James Angell may refer to:

- James Burrill Angell (1829–1916), President of the University of Vermont and the University of Michigan, U.S. Minister to China and Turkey
- James Rowland Angell (1869–1949), President of Yale University, son of former

== See also ==
- James Angel (disambiguation)
- Jim Angle (1946–2022), American journalist
