= James Baird (merchant) =

Newfoundland merchant and politician (1828–1915)

James Baird MLC
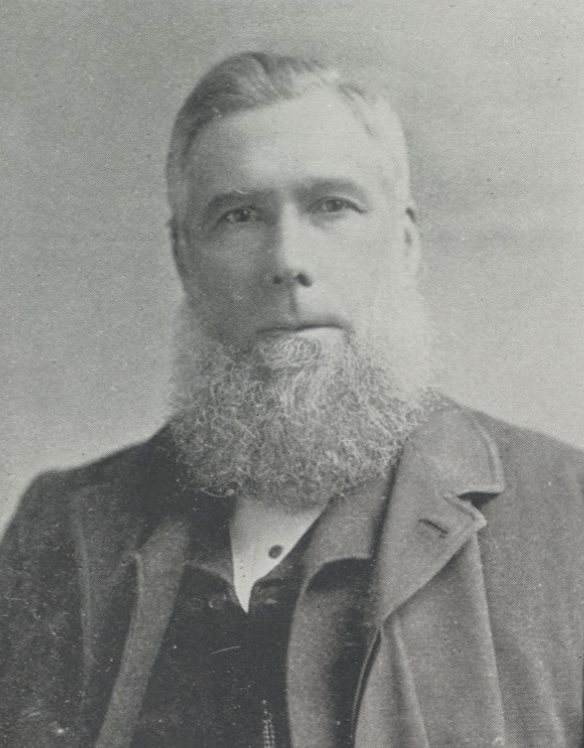
- Baird in 1894

Member of the Legislative Council of Newfoundland
- In office 1898 – May 30, 1915
- Appointed by: James S. Winter

Personal details
- Born: November 30, 1828 Saltcoats, Scotland, U.K.
- Died: May 30, 1915 (aged 86) St. John's, Newfoundland
- Spouse: Anne Boyd (m. 1857)
- Children: 4
- Occupation: Merchant

James Baird (November 30, 1828 – May 30, 1915) was a Scottish-born Newfoundland merchant and politician.

== Early life and business ==
Baird was born in Saltcoats in Ayrshire, Scotland, the son of Hugh Baird and Margaret (née Anderson). He emigrated to Newfoundland at the age of 16 in 1844 and soon established himself as a prominent merchant. Alongside a brother and later his nephew, the Baird family built up a business which included a large array of general merchandise and eventually branched into the fishery supply business. He was an early steam yacht owner: the Griffin was built in 1865 for him by Aitken & Mansel, Whiteinch, Glasgow, Scotland. By the mid-1880s, James Baird Ltd. had entered the fish export trade and survived both the St. John's fire in 1892 and the banking collapse a few years later. He was highly important in the founding and supporting of many industries.

== Modus vivendi case and legacy ==
Baird, despite his high profile and important business career, is best known in Newfoundland history for the famous Baird et al. v. Walker case. It was a dispute over the location and operation of a lobster factory on land deemed to be assigned to the French. Baird won a settlement in the Supreme Court of Newfoundland. In 1898 he was appointed to the Legislative Council of Newfoundland, a position he held for the remainder of his life.

Baird's summer house, known as both Bryn Mawr Cottage and Baird Cottage, was built in 1905 by architect William F. Butler. It burned in an early morning fire in December 2022.
