= John C. Mather (New York politician) =

American politician

John Cotton Mather (November 30, 1813 in Deposit, Delaware County, New York – August 13, 1882 in Watertown, Jefferson County, New York) was an American politician. In 1853, he was the first person tried by the New York Court for the Trial of Impeachments.

== Life ==
He was the son of Dr. Thaddeus Mather (1778–1854) and Sarah (Parker) Mather. In 1837, he married Alva Porter.

At the New York state election, 1847, he ran for Canal Commissioner on the Democratic and Anti-Rent tickets, but was defeated. At the New York state election, 1850, he ran again, on the Democratic ticket, and was elected, remaining in office from 1851 to 1853. In July 1853, he was impeached by the New York State Assembly, but was acquitted by the Court for the Trial of Impeachments. At the New York state election, 1853, he ran for re-election on the Hard ticket, but was defeated by Whig Cornelius Gardinier.

He was a member of the New York State Senate (4th D.) in 1858 and 1859.

In 1869, he married Helen Goulding.

State Senator Francis M. Bixby (born 1828) was his nephew.

== Sources ==
- The New York Civil List compiled by Franklin Benjamin Hough (page 42 and 435; Weed, Parsons and Co., 1858)
- The impeachment proceedings in Journal of the Assembly of the State of New York (1853)
- His father's obit in NYT on October 19, 1854
- Obit of his brother Calvin Edson Mather, in NYT on July 11, 1853
- Lineage of Rev. Richard Mather by Horace E. Mather (1890)
- Hon. John Cotton Mather at Mather Clan

New York State Senate
Preceded by Joseph H. Petty	New York State Senate; 4th District; 1858–1859	Succeeded by J. McLeod Murphy
