= Yvette Angel =

American basketball player and coach (born 1963)

Personal information
- Born: October 14, 1963 (age 63)
- Listed height: 5 ft 8 in (1.73 m)

Career information
- College: Ohio State (1981–1985)
- WNBA draft: 1997: undrafted
- Playing career: 1997–1997
- Position: Guard
- Number: 11

Career history

Playing
- 1997: Sacramento Monarchs

Coaching
- c. 1987: Michigan State (graduate assistant coach)
- 1989-??: Notre Dame (assistant coach)
- 1997: Sacramento Monarchs (assistant coach)

Career WNBA statistics
- Points: 14 (2.8 ppg)
- Rebounds: 9 (1.8 rpg)
- Assists: 11 (2.2 bpg)
- Stats at Basketball Reference

Yvette Angel is a former basketball player and coach who played collegiately for the Ohio State Buckeyes, and professionally in the WNBA for the Sacramento Monarchs.

== Career ==
In high school, Angel played for the Buffalo Academy of the Sacred Heart women's team under coach Sister Maria Pares. The team was undefeated during Angel's career, having reached a 109-game winning streak.

For her college career, Angel played for the Ohio State Buckeyes during the team's first four years in the Big Ten Conference. In all four of Angel's seasons, the Buckeyes were the conference's regular season champions, and were undefeated in all 18 intraconference games during the 1984–85 season, Angel's final year with the team.

Angel left the Buckeyes as its, at the time, third-leading women's scorer all time, and subsequently accepted a job as a graduate assistant coach with Michigan State University. Afterward, she was an assistant coach at Notre Dame. She played for Avón Alcalá in Spain in 1986. When she arrived in January 1986, the team was close to relegation, but she helped lead the team to the playoffs for the championship. She scored 36 points against Sabor d'Abans on the first match of playoff in Alcalá de Henares, defending against the Sabor d'Abans team led by Anna Junyer.

Angel was picked in the 1997 American Basketball League draft during fourth round, 31st overall, by the Seattle Reign. 1997 was also the inaugural year of the WNBA, as well as the year before the ABL folded.

Despite no Buckeyes being drafted in 1997, Angel was one of three Buckeyes to play in the WNBA in its 1997 inaugural season. In her only stint in the WNBA, she played five games in July 1997 with the Sacramento Monarchs, starting three. Her WNBA career highs included six points in her final game, against the Houston Comets on July 25, 1997; and five assists in her third game, on July 18, also against the Comets. Angel's playing career ended when the Monarchs reassigned her as an assistant coach after they had fired head coach Mary Murphy midseason.

== Legacy ==
In 1997, Angel was inducted into the Ohio State Hall of Fame. Two years later, Angel was inducted into the Greater Buffalo Sports Hall of Fame for her contributions as a player for the Buffalo Academy of the Sacred Heart basketball team.

== Career statistics ==
Legend
GP	Games played	GS	Games started	MPG	Minutes per game	RPG	Rebounds per game
APG	Assists per game	SPG	Steals per game	BPG	Blocks per game	PPG	Points per game
TO	Turnovers per game	FG%	Field-goal percentage	3P%	3-point field-goal percentage	FT%	Free-throw percentage
**Bold**	Career best	°	League leader

=== WNBA ===
==== Regular season ====
Year	Team	GP	GS	MPG	FG%	3P%	FT%	RPG	APG	SPG	BPG	TO	PPG
1997	Sacramento	5	3	18.0	.438	.000	.000	1.8	2.2	.8	.2	1.6	2.8

=== College ===
*	Led NCAA Division I

Year	Team	GP	FG%	FT%	RPG	APG	PPG
1981–82	Ohio State	27	.477	.646	4.5		11.4
1982–83	Ohio State	28	**.536**	**.750**	**5.2**		**15.3**
1983–84	Ohio State	29*	.506	.714	4.2		13.4
1984–85	Ohio State	**31**	.514	.686	3.8	5.3	14.1
Career		115	.510	.702	4.4	5.3	13.6
