= Charles H. Sherrill (ambassador) =

American diplomat (1867–1936)

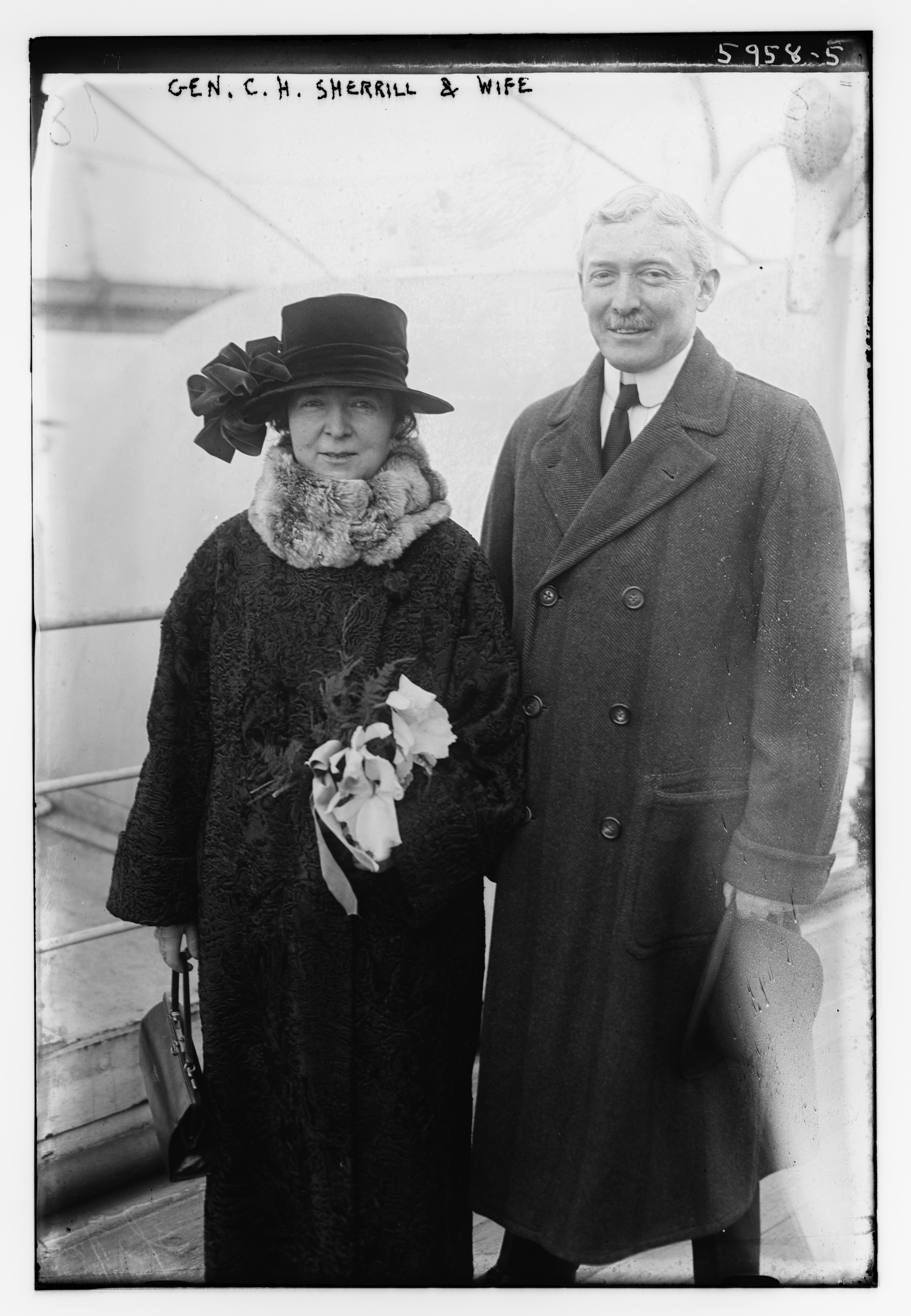
- Sherrill with his wife

19th United States Minister to Argentina
- In office June 30, 1909 – September 16, 1910
- Preceded by: Spencer F. Eddy
- Succeeded by: John W. Garrett

Personal details
- Born: April 13, 1867 Washington, DC
- Died: June 25, 1936 (aged 69) Paris, France
- Parent(s): Charles H. Sarah Fulton (nee Wnykoop)
- Education: Yale University

Charles Hitchcock Sherrill Jr. (April 13, 1867 in Washington, DC, United States – June 25, 1936 in Paris, France) was an American politician, diplomat, sport officer, and author.

== Early life and career ==
His parents were New York lobbyist and state politician Charles H. Sherrill and Sarah Fulton (Wynkoop) Sherrill. He studied at Yale University, was called to the New York State Bar and became a New York City lawyer.

During World War I, he succeeded Louis W. Stotesbury as Adjutant General of New York; he was promoted to brigadier general while in this post.

He was appointed as US Minister to Argentina from 1909 to 1910 and served an important role in securing the contracts for two Rivadavia-class battleships during the South American dreadnought race, and US Ambassador to Turkey from 1932 to 1933.

== Support for dictators ==
Shortly after retiring from public office Sherrill proclaimed his admiration for Europe's strong men and predicted the end of parliamentary form of government, which he dubbed "inept" and referred to as "so-called democracy." In a long letter to the editors of The New York Times, published on June 4, 1933, he singled out Benito Mussolini, the fascist dictator of Italy, for praise and spoke of the "amazing betterment" of life accomplished by his régime. He wrote of Adolf Hitler, the new leader of Germany, "Whether one admires [him] or not, at least he is a leader who leads." Soon enough, he wrote, "people the world over... will follow courageous leaders."

== 1936 Olympics ==
In 1935, during the preparations for the 1936 Olympic Games, Sherrill met twice with Hitler. A modern historian wrote that Sherrill was "mesmerized by the force of Hitler's personality and charisma." In his one-hour talk with Hitler, Sherrill insisted for at least one token Jew to be included in the German team for the Olympic Winter and another for the Olympic Summer Games. Hitler refused and when he was threatened by Sherrill with an American boycott, promised purely German Olympic Games. Sherrill sent the information to the IOC president, Henri de Baillet-Latour, who did not insist on Jewish participation on the German teams. After the Nuremberg Racial Laws, only Half-Jews, with no more than two of the four grandparents being racially Jewish, were still permitted to represent Germany. With Theodor Lewald as President of the Organizing Committee for the Summer Games, Rudi Ball (hockey, Winter Games) and Helene Mayer (Fencing, Summer Games), three Half Jews calmed world public opinion.

== Sports ==
In May 1887, in his freshman year at Yale, Sherrill won the 100 yards at the Intercollegiate Association of Amateur Athletes of America (IC4A) Championships. Prior to the formation of the National Collegiate Athletic Association (NCAA) this was the premier inter-collegiate competition in the country. Then in September he won the 100 yards at the National Association of Amateur Athletes of America (NAAA) Championship, effectively the United States national championship, with both of these taking place at the Manhattan Athletic Club Grounds on 8th Avenue and 86th Street in Manhattan, New York.

The following Spring he popularized the crouch start in track and field athletics. From the earliest days of pedestrianism runners started their races by standing at the start line, front foot behind the line, bending forward slightly from the waist. At the Rockaway Hunting Club Games, Cedarhurst, Long Island, on Saturday 12 May 1888, the first item on the programme was the 100 yards for undergraduates. The four competitors were Charles H. Sherrill (Yale Un.), Sam Dericksen (Columbia Un.), S. J. King (Princeton Un.), and F. B. Lund (Harvard Un.). When the Yale man crouched down at the start the starter, thinking that Sherrill did not know how to start, held up the race to give him instructions. Eventually the starter was persuaded that Sherrill knew what he was doing, and that he was employing a new start. He won "handily," in 10 1/2 seconds. Later the same afternoon he also won the 220 yards in 22 3/5.

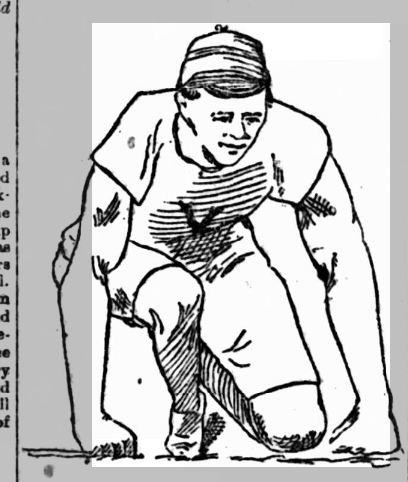
Charles Sherrill of Yale performing the crouch start

The Sport (Dublin) described his position as follows: "Sherrill gets down behind the mark, closes his hands tightly over his corks and rests his knuckles on or behind the scratch line. He rests on the ball of the right foot, with the left well down on the ground. When the pistol is fired he gives an upward jump or dive and gets into running very quickly. It is a question yet to be determined whether he gains anything by this new move."

Fourteen days later he won the 100 yards and 220 yards double at the IC4A meet at the Manhattan AC Grounds in New York. That summer the two leading amateur clubs in the country were planning a joint trip to England to compete in the AAA Championships, and both the Manhattan AC and the New York AC tried to recruit Sherrill, but the recent death of his father was given as the reason, "his mother is opposed to his participation in athletic sports, not to speak of his journeying abroad."

At Hamilton Park, New Haven, Connecticut, on 15 June 1888, Sherrill set, in two separate races, two American records, and tied another. In the first race he ran 250 yards in 25 4/5 to break the record set by Lon Myers in 1882. Then in the second race he ran 125 yards in 12 3/5 seconds, to tie the record set by Wendell Baker of Harvard, and he continued to 150 yards in 15 seconds to beat the record set by Harry Brooks of Yale in 1886.

The first Amateur Athletic Union (AAU) Championships were held at Detroit, Michigan, on Wednesday 26 September 1888, and in the 100 yards Sherrill tied for second place with Malcolm Ford but declined an offer to run off the tie and Ford was awarded second place by default. In his heat of the 220 yards Sherrill suffered an injury to a tendon in his leg and was carried from the track. Three days later the first crouch start to be seen in Britain occurred at a South London Harriers promotion at the Oval cricket ground, where Thomas Nicholas of Cardiff attracted a lot of attention to himself in a heat of the 100 yards, which he won. In the final he was second to Ernest Pelling of Ranelagh Harriers, who later that afternoon went to Stamford Bridge and set the world best at 250 yards.

In February 1889 Sherrill was reported as being "desperately ill," but by May he had sufficiently recovered from both this and his tendon injury to retain his IC4A 100 yards title in New York. One of the timekeepers caught him at 9 4/5 seconds but he was officially given 10 1/5. He also won the 220 yards in 22 2/5.

In May 1890, in the Yale spring Games at New Haven, Connecticut, he recorded 10 seconds for 100 yards, to equal with five other men the world best for the distance. Five days later at the Berkeley AC Games, Berkeley Oval, New York, he again ran 10 seconds for 100 yards and this performance was subsequently ratified as an American record. Also in May he retained both his IC4A titles, at 100 yards and 220 yards, but shortly after that at a race in New York he experienced a recurrence of his thigh injury and his career was effectively over. He travelled to England at the end of the summer and was seen at a couple of meets in the London area and entered for the 100 yards at the AAA Championships, but he did not run in any of these and his final race was at a South London Harriers Autumn Meeting at the Kennington Oval at the end of September 1890 where he failed to qualify from his heat.

When he retired from athletics he still held a share in the world record at 100 yards and the second fastest times in the world at both 150 yards and 250 yards. From 1922 to his death, he was an important member of the International Olympic Committee and played vital role in organizing the 1932 Summer Olympics, in Los Angeles, and calming American public opinion on the 1936 Summer Olympics, in Berlin.

== Author ==
He wrote twenty-two books, especially on stained glass windows in European churches, and the interwar politics including Turkey (Atatürk), Italy (Mussolini), and the United States (Roosevelt).

Diplomatic posts
Preceded by Joseph Grew	United States Ambassador to Turkey; 1933–1936	Succeeded by Robert Peet Skinner
