= Patrick Henry Jones =

American lawyer (1830–1900)

Patrick H. Jones
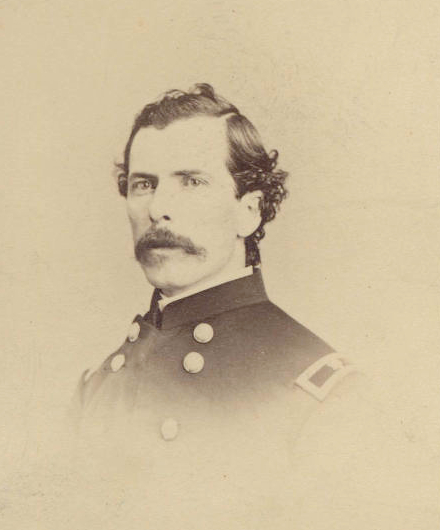
- Jones circa 1860–1870
- Born: November 20, 1830; County Westmeath, Ireland
- Died: July 23, 1900 (aged 69); Port Richmond, New York, US
- Resting place: St. Peter's Cemetery, West New Brighton, New York
- Occupations: Lawyer, public servant and postmaster
- Known for: Served as New York City postmaster from 1869–1872; an officer in the "Irish Rifles" and "Hardtack regiment" during the American Civil War
- Political party: Republican
- Children: 4 sons

Patrick Henry Jones (November 20, 1830 – July 23, 1900) was an American lawyer, public servant and Postmaster of New York City during the mid-to late 19th century. In 1878, he was involved in the Alexander T. Stewart bodysnatching case when he was contacted by the kidnappers to act as an intermediary between themselves and the Stewart estate. When negotiations stalled between the Stewart family's lawyer Henry Hilton, he assisted Stewart's widow in negotiating for the return of her husband's body.

Jones also had a successful military career serving with the Union Army during the American Civil War, being involved in thirty major battles and countless skirmishes, and reaching the rank of brigadier general before the war's end. He was one of ten Irish-Americans to become brigade commanders and one of four Irish born officers to become a divisional commander.

== Biography ==
=== Early life and legal career ===
Born in Clonmellon, County Westmeath, Ireland on November 20, 1830, Jones attended grammar school in Dublin for three years until emigrating with his family to the United States in 1840. They settled on a farm in Cattaraugus County, New York where Jones would spend most of his childhood. Because of his poor background, he received only a limited education at the Union School in Ellicottville. In 1850, the 20-year-old Jones became involved in journalism and traveled as a correspondent throughout the Western States for a leading New York journal. He later became the local editor for the Buffalo Republic and one of the editors of the Buffalo Sentinel.

Eventually, Jones decided to pursue a career in law and later studied under the firm of Addison Rice. He was admitted to the bar in 1856 and afterwards practiced law with Addison in Ellicottville as a full partner. By 1860, he had established himself as one of the most prominent lawyers in western New York. A lifelong Democrat, he became disillusioned by the party's support of Southern succession from the Union and, in May 1861, decided to join the military in defense of the United States.

=== Military service ===
Upon the outbreak of the American Civil War, Jones readily joined the Union Army. On July 7, 1861, he enlisted with the 37th New York Volunteers, popularly known as the "Irish Rifles", under Colonel John H. McCunn. He was initially a private but quickly found himself elected to the rank of second lieutenant by the men in the regiment. He was present at the First Battle of Bull Run, only two weeks after his enlistment, but saw no action as the unit was held in reserve. Jones displayed "gallant conduct" during his first years with the regiment and soon rose in rank to first lieutenant and adjutant on November 4, 1861, and then major on January 21, 1862. He and the "Irish Rifles" later joined General Samuel P. Heintzelman's III Corps, as part of the 3rd Brigade of the 3rd Division under Brigadier General Philip Kearny, during the Peninsula campaign and participated in Williamsburg, Seven Pines and the Seven Days campaign. Jones was also present when the 37th New York Volunteers, then attached to the 3rd Brigade of the 1st Division of the III Corps, were at the Second Battle of Bull Run. In May and June, he began suffering from malaria and was hospitalized in Washington, D.C., on September 26 remaining there until the end of October. He was also briefly an officer to Major General Franz Sigel prior to the retirement of General Ambrose Burnside and the reorganization of the Army of the Potomac.

On October 8, 1862, Jones was promoted to the rank of colonel and transferred to the 154th New York Volunteers, or the "Hardtack regiment", then under command by his former law partner Colonel Addison Rice. Rice had founded the regiment and, within two months of its arrival in Northern Virginia, he turned over his command to Jones. The 154th was part of General Oliver O. Howard's XI Corps during the Battle of Chancellorsville, attached to the 1st Brigade of the 2nd Division commanded by Brigadier General Adolph von Steinwehr, where Jones was wounded in the right hip when his unit was ambushed and overrun by Confederate troops under Thomas "Stonewall" Jackson resulting in his capture. Jones remained a prisoner-of-war for five months until being released in a prisoner exchange in October 1863; other accounts claim he was paroled for medical reasons on May 15 and again hospitalized in Washington during June where had an attack of amaurosis two months later. After his release from hospital in Annapolis, Maryland, Jones was placed in charge of paroled prisoners before returning to active duty and accompanied the XI Corps upon being transferred to Tennessee. The unit was present at Chattanooga during the assault on Missionary Ridge the next month, however they did not participate in the battle.

In April 1864, Jones took a brief leave of absence to recover his health. When the XI and XII Corps were combined to form the Major General William T. Sherman's XX Corps during that spring, although still in poor health, Jones accepted command of the 2nd Brigade of the 2nd Division ("Geary's White Stars") during the Atlanta campaign, the March to the Sea and the Carolinas campaign. On May 8, he was seriously injured in a skirmish at Buzzard's Roost (Mill Creek Gap) when his horse fell off a cliff during the Battle of Rocky Face Ridge. He was cleared to return to duty a month later, however his surgeon recommended "a change of climate and mode of living" allowing Jones to take another sick leave in December. He resumed his command during the final weeks of the campaign and was present at the surrender of Confederate General Joseph E. Johnston in March 1865.

On April 18, Jones accepted a commission as brigadier-general on the personal recommendations of Generals Joseph "Fighting Joe" Hooker and Oliver Howard. President Abraham Lincoln telegraphed General Sherman to inquire about their requests to which Sherman praised his "gallant services in the field" during the campaign. Rejoining his old unit at Goldsboro, North Carolina, he remained at that rank for the rest of the war and resigned on June 17, 1865.

=== Stewart bodysnatching case ===
After his resignation, Jones resumed his law practice in Ellicottville and in November 1865 was elected on the Republican ticket as Clerk of the New York Court of Appeals. He remained in this office until December 31, 1868. On August 13, 1868, Jones was appointed by Gov. Reuben E. Fenton as Register of New York City (the local recorder of deeds) to fill the vacancy caused by the death of Charles G. Halpine, remaining in this office until the end of the year with the understanding that the fees of the office be paid over to Halpine's widow. On April 1, 1869, Jones was appointed by President Ulysses S. Grant as Postmaster of New York City and was eventually succeeded by Thomas L. James upon his resignation in 1872. From 1875 to 1877, Jones was again Register of New York City, elected in November 1874 on the Republican ticket. Afterwards he resumed his private practice.

In January 1877, Jones was contacted by Henry G. Romaine requesting that he act as an intermediary between himself and the Stewart estate. Romaine had been involved in stealing the body of Alexander T. Stewart three months earlier and was demanding a ransom from his widow Cornelia. In several signed letters to Jones, Romaine offered the return of Stewart's body for $250,000 and was instructed to contact him through personal ads in the New York Herald. He also received a small packet, express delivered from Canada, which included the knobs and two of the silver handles from Stewart's casket as well as a small strip of velvet and triangular piece of paper. Jones immediately reported the incident to the NYPD Chief of Police George W. Walling and, after a meeting with Walling and Henry Hilton, Jones agreed to proceed in the negotiations.

On February 5, Jones placed a personal ad offering to open negotiations. A letter was sent six days later, postmarked Boston, in which Romaine offered the return of Stewart's body on several conditions which included payment of $250,000 in cash, that the body would be delivered to an arranged spot 25 miles from Montreal, Quebec, Canada only to Jones and Hilton, Jones would hold the money to turn it over to a representative and for "both parties to maintain forever an unbroken silence in regard to the transaction". Hilton refused to agree to these terms and broke off negotiations. Jones was then told to deliver these demands to Stewart's widow himself, but Jones refused to participate any further.

A year later, after further negotiations by Hilton had failed, Jones was approached by Stewart's widow to negotiate on her behalf. Romaine agreed to return the body for $100,000 and, while the distraught widow favored to accept the offer, Jones persuaded her to allow him to continue negotiations and was eventually able to get Romaine to accept an offer of $20,000. He later oversaw the delivery of the ransom money as well as the return of the body in Westchester County, New York.

=== Later years ===
Jones suffered serious medical problems in his old age, specifically deafness and chronic diarrhea, which his physician blamed on his exposure to artillery fire and his time in the swamps along the Chickahominy River during his military service. He also suffered from constant pain in his right sciatic nerve, attributed to his old war wound suffered at Chancellorsville, as well as his wound in the gluteal region. Almost every spring and fall, he suffered from chills and fever lasting a week or two and confined him to bed. He also had occasional episodes of jaundice for which he took calomel, citrus of magnesia and an unknown type of Indian medicine.

In October 1886, a medical examination showed that the scar where the bullet had entered, located two inches below the trochanter major, was the "size of a ten-cent piece" while the exit wound four inches back and two inches below the first scar. His liver and spleen were both enlarged by percussion, his skin looked anemic, the conjunctiva of his eyes were yellowish, and had suffered considerable weight loss.

His condition had worsened after another examination in August 1898 and his health continued to decline over the next two years. In early-July 1900, Jones began suffering from severe gastroenteritis. His condition did not respond to therapeutic treatments as he lost control of his bowels and was unable to keep down solid food, living on scalded milk and brandy. On July 18, 1900, Jones died from cardiac failure, indirectly caused by his gastroenteritis, at his home in Port Richmond, New York. His funeral was held at St. Mary's Church two days later and then buried in St. Peter's Cemetery.

== See also ==
- List of American Civil War generals (Union)
