= Charles H. Sherrill =

American lobbyist and politician

Charles Hitchcock Sherrill Sr. (March 24, 1814, Sandy Hill, Washington County, New York – January 4, 1887, Washington, D.C.) was an American lobbyist and politician from New York.

== Life ==
He was the son of Darius Sherrill and Mary (Day) Sherrill. On December 17, 1851, he married Sarah Fulton Wynkoop (1829–1897).

He began his political career as a Whig, then became a Barnburner, and was a Canal Commissioner from 1857 to 1859, elected on the Republican ticket in 1856.

In 1861, he removed to Washington, D.C., to look after some business interests in coal and railroads. He made the acquaintance of Collis P. Huntington, Charles Crocker, and Leland Stanford, and lobbied for their Central Pacific Railroad and other projects in the United States Congress.

He died of heart disease.

His son Charles Hitchcock Sherrill (1867–1936) was U.S. Minister to Argentina from 1909 to 1910, and United States Ambassador to Turkey from 1932 to 1933.

== Sources ==
- The New York Civil List compiled by Franklin Benjamin Hough (page 42; Weed, Parsons and Co., 1858)
- The New York Civil List compiled by Franklin Benjamin Hough, Stephen C. Hutchins and Edgar Albert Werner (1867; page 406)
- The Descendants of Samuel Sherrill of Easthampton, Long Island, New York by Charles Hitchcock Sherrill (1894) [gives Sandy Hill as birthplace]
- Obit in NYT on January 5, 1887 [gives erroneously Cuba, Allegany County, as birthplace, and states erroneously that he was elected on the Democratic ticket (the Dem. candidate for Canal Commissioner was John Leslie Russell)]
- Letter by Collis P. Huntington, commenting the NYT's obit of Sherrill, in NYT on January 6, 1887
