= Cornelius Gardinier =

American politician

Cornelius Gardinier (June 24, 1809 in Fultonville, Montgomery County, New York – October 21, 1892 in Darien, Fairfield County, Connecticut) was an American politician from New York.

== Life ==
Born to Rynier Gardinier and Mary Newkirk, he married Catherine and had at least ten children.

He was Postmaster of Fultonville from 1841 to 1843. In 1853, he ran for Canal Commissioner on the Whig ticket against John C. Mather. He won the election and remained in office from 1854 until 1856.

He died on October 21, 1892, in Darien, Connecticut, at the home of his son-in-law J. H. Taylor.

== Sources ==
- Official State Canvass in NYT on January 3, 1854
- Whig State Officers in the Havana Journal, of Havana, on January 14, 1854
- The New York Civil List compiled by Franklin Benjamin Hough (pg. 42; Weed, Parsons and Co., 1858)
- Death notice in the New York Herald on October 23, 1892
- History of the Town of Glen
