= Pele Yoetz =

Book by Eliezer Papo

The Pele Yoetz (Hebrew: פלא יועץ) is a book of Musar literature (ethics in Rabbinic Judaism) first published in Constantinople in 1824 by Eliezer Papo. The work is a "classical moral treatise", and compilation of essential Jewish concepts, organized with its topics following the order of the Hebrew alphabet. It is written in a style that "speaks to the heart as well as the mind".

The Musar that it presents is not limited to abstract ethical precepts and esoteric concepts; rather it encompasses all aspects and phases of day-to-day Jewish living: the ritual as well as the ethical, the mundane as well as the sublime. It also offers advice on human interrelationships such as between parent and child, husband and wife, employer and employee.
