= Hayyim Vidal Angel =

Rabbi and preacher

Ḥayyim Vidal Shabbethai ben Shabbethai Angel (Hebrew: חיים וידאל שבתי בן שבתי אנגיל; fl. mid-18th century) was a rabbi and preacher in Salonika (Thessaloniki, in Greece) in the 18th century, under the Ottoman Empire. He wrote Sippur ha-Ḥayyim (Tale of Life), containing several funeral orations and miscellaneous homilies on the Pentateuch (Salonika, 1760).

== Publications ==
- Sippur ha-Ḥayyim [Tale of Life]. Salonica. 1760.
