= Aliens Act =

"Aliens Act" or "Alien Act" can refer to:

- The Aliens Act 1698 (11 Will. 3 c. 6) (England)
- The Alien Act 1705 (England)
- The Aliens Act 1793 (GB)
- The Aliens Act 1905 (UK)
- The Aliens Act of 1937 (South Africa)
- The Aliens Act 1880 (NZ)
- The Alien and Sedition Acts (USA)
- The Aliens Act of 2005 (Sweden) (Utlänningslagen)
