= Hayyim Angel =

American rabbi and author

Hayyim Angel is an American rabbi, academic, author and editor who is the National Scholar of the Institute for Jewish Ideas and Ideals (which was founded by his father, Marc D. Angel).

Angel has taught advanced Bible courses to undergraduate, graduate, and rabbinical students at Yeshiva University since 1996, and lectures widely. He also serves on the Tanakh Faculty of the Beit Midrash of Teaneck, and is the Tanakh Education Scholar at Yeshivat Ben Porat Yosef school in Paramus, New Jersey. Angel previously served as rabbi of Congregation Shearith Israel in New York City (1995–2013), and as rabbinic scholar at Congregation Kehilath Jeshurun in New York (2014–2017).

Angel received his B.A. in Jewish studies summa cum laude from Yeshiva College, his M.A. in Bible from the Bernard Revel Graduate School of Jewish Studies and his M.S. in Jewish education from the Azrieli Graduate School of Jewish Education and Administration. Angel's rabbinical ordination was from the Rabbi Isaac Elchanan Theological Seminary of Yeshiva University.

Angel has published over 150 scholarly articles, primarily in Hebrew Bible, and is author or editor of twenty books. His scholarship focuses on the interaction between traditional and academic approaches to Bible study. Rabbi Yaakov Beasley, in a review of Angel's work and methodology in April, 2018, refers to him as "one of the great Tanakh teachers of our time."

Angel is editor of Conversations, the journal of the Institute for Jewish Ideas and Ideals. Angel also serves on the editorial boards of Tradition and Megadim.

Angel lives in Teaneck, New Jersey, with his wife and four children.

== Books ==
- Psalms: A Companion Volume (New York: Kodesh Press, 2022)
- Cornerstones: The Bible and Jewish Ideology (New York: Kodesh Press, 2020).
- Orthodoxy: Widening Horizons, ed. Hayyim Angel. Conversations 36 (New York: Institute for Jewish Ideas and Ideals, 2020).
- Selected Writings of Rabbi Marc D. Angel: Celebrating 50 Years of Rabbinic Service, ed. Hayyim Angel. Conversations 34 (New York: Institute for Jewish Ideas and Ideals, 2019).
- The Keys to the Palace: Essays Exploring the Religious Value of Reading the Bible (New York: Kodesh Press, 2017).
- Increasing Peace Through Balanced Torah Study. Conversations 27 (New York: Institute for Jewish Ideas and Ideals, 2017).
- Haggai, Zechariah, and Malachi: Prophecy in an Age of Uncertainty (Jerusalem: Maggid, 2016).
- Jewish Holiday Companion: Insights into the Meaning of the Holidays, Their Laws, Liturgy, and Biblical Readings (New York: Institute for Jewish Ideas and Ideals, 2014).
- Peshat Isn’t So Simple: Essays on Developing a Religious Methodology to Bible Study (New York: Kodesh Press, 2014).
- A Synagogue Companion: Insights on the Torah, Haftarot, and Shabbat Morning Prayers (New York: Institute for Jewish Ideas and Ideals, 2014).
- Vision from the Prophet and Counsel from the Elders: A Survey of Nevi’im and Ketuvim (New York: OU Press, 2013).
- Where the Yeshiva Meets the University: Traditional and Academic Approaches to Tanakh Study, ed. Hayyim Angel. Conversations 15 (New York: Institute for Jewish Ideas and Ideals, 2013).
- Rav Shalom Banayikh: Essays Presented to Rabbi Shalom Carmy by Friends and Students in Celebration of Forty Years of Teaching, ed. Hayyim Angel and Yitzchak Blau (Jersey City, NJ: Ktav, 2012).
- Prophetic Sermons: Thoughts on the Haftarot (New York: Sephardic Publication Foundation, 2011).
- Creating Space between Peshat and Derash: A Collection of Studies on Tanakh (Jersey City, NJ: Ktav-Sephardic Publication Foundation, 2011).
- Know Before Whom You Stand: Thoughts About Prayer (New York: Sephardic Publication Foundation, 2010). Revised second edition, 2011.
- Revealed Texts, Hidden Meanings: Finding the Religious Significance in Tanakh (Jersey City, NJ: Ktav-Sephardic Publication Foundation, 2009).
- Through an Opaque Lens (New York: Sephardic Publication Foundation, 2006). Through an Opaque Lens: The Bible Refracted through Eternal Rabbinic Wisdom, revised second edition (New York: Kodesh Press, 2013).
- Rabbi Haim David Halevi: Gentle Scholar, Courageous Thinker. Co-author of book with Rabbi Marc D. Angel (Jerusalem: Urim Publications, 2006). Authored four chapters and edited book.
- Seeking Good, Speaking Peace: Collected Essays of Rabbi Marc D. Angel, ed. Hayyim Angel (Hoboken, NJ: Ktav, 1995).
