= Katherine Angel =

British academic and writer

- Born: Brussels, Belgium
- Occupation: Writer

Katherine Angel is a British academic and writer whose 2012 work of literary non-fiction, Unmastered: A Book on Desire, Most Difficult to Tell, attracted worldwide attention.

== Life ==
Angel was born in Brussels and earned an undergraduate degree in philosophy. She studied at Harvard University on a JH Choate Fellowship, and earned a Ph.D. in the history of psychiatry and sexuality from the University of Cambridge. She has been a postdoctoral fellow in the history of medicine at University of Warwick. Angel was a lecturer in creative writing at Birkbeck, University of London and is currently a senior lecturer in the School of English and Drama at Queen Mary University of London.

In 2012, Angel published Unmastered: A Book on Desire, Most Difficult to Tell, a literary and experimental meditation on sexual desire. Unmastered attracted international attention.

In 2019, Angel's book Daddy Issues was published by Peninsula Press.

In 2021, Tomorrow Sex Will Be Good Again: Women and Desire in the Age of Consent was published by Verso.

== Critical reception ==
Unmastered garnered generally positive reviews. Talitha Stevenson, writing in The Guardian, noted a "distinctive sensibility" in the book, and wrote admiringly that "a sumptuous picture emerges of Angel's relationship with her partner, and she shows the way love permits the ordinary to snuggle up to the sublime." Stevenson concludes that "Unmastered is a blemished but vigorous testament to a female libido undaunted by the cold shower of self-analysis, or by the bedside interjections of feminist heroines."

Stuart Hammond, writing in Dazed Digital, lauded Unmastered, describing it as "one of those totally out-of-the blue, impossible-to-classify, weird and new and wonderful fiction-ish nonfiction books, which happily come along every so often and make you go, 'Whoa: this is what we need now.'"

Writing in For Books' Sake, Henna Butt observed that Angel's "background has built the confident feminism which pervades Unmastered and seems to bolster her even when other feminists have deemed her views to be unacceptable... Angel illustrates how she has felt feminism, in some instances, enforces precisely the same "shaming and silencing" of women's sexuality that it seeks to oppose. This is shown through an occasion when Angel listens to Shere Hite and is disappointed to find the disapproval with which penetrative sex with men is discussed."

Kirkus Reviews called Unmastered "[a] revealing look at postmodern feminism and its role in female desire through one woman's personal anecdotes, meditations and professional research," and went on to say that "Angel provides an intelligent examination of how today's women satiate their needs and desires." Observing that Angel "struggles with her personal convictions regarding love and lust in and out of the bedroom," the reviewer praised the book's "empowering conclusion," and recommended Unmastered as "an unconventional and strikingly lyrical observation of women and their desire to speak regarding the fulfillment of their sexual and emotional needs."

== Works ==
=== Literary non-fiction ===
- Unmastered: A Book on Desire, Most Difficult to Tell (2012)
- Daddy Issues (2019)
- Tomorrow Sex Will Be Good Again: Women and Desire in the Age of Consent (2021)

== See also ==
- British literature

== Sources ==
- Stevenson, Talitha (2012). "Unmastered by Katherine Angel (review): There are many pleasures in a series of reflections on female desire, finds Talitha Stevenson". The Guardian.
- Kaminsky, Theresa (5 April 2013). "Unmastered Angel: PW Talks with Katherine Angel". Publishers Weekly.
- Hammond, Stuart (23 September 2012). "Q&A / Books: Katherine Angel". Dazed Digital.
- Butt, Henna (9 October 2012). "For Books' Sake Talks To: Katherine Angel". For Books' Sake. Archived from the original on 22 October 2018.
- "Katherine Angel Biography". Internationales Literaturfestival Berlin. 2013. Archived from the original on 22 October 2018.
- "Katherine Angel Faculty Profile". Birkbeck, University of London. 2018.
- "Review of Unmastered". Kirkus Reviews. 4 May 2013.
