= William G. Angel =

American politician and lawyer

William Gardner Angel

Member of the U.S. House of Representatives from New York's 13th district
- In office March 4, 1829 – March 3, 1833
- Preceded by: Samuel Chase
- Succeeded by: Reuben Whallon
- In office March 4, 1825 – March 3, 1827
- Preceded by: Isaac Williams, Jr.
- Succeeded by: Samuel Chase

Personal details
- Born: July 17, 1790 New Shoreham, Rhode Island, US
- Died: August 13, 1858 (aged 68) Angelica, New York, US
- Party: Jacksonian
- Spouse(s): Emily P. English Angel; Clarissa English Angel
- Children: William P. Angel; Wilkes Angel; James R. Angel; Texas Angel
- Profession: lawyer, politician

William Gardner Angel (July 17, 1790 – August 13, 1858) was an American politician and lawyer who served two terms as a U.S. representative for New York's 13th congressional district from 1825 to 1827, and from 1829 to 1833.

== Early life and education ==
Angel was born in New Shoreham, Rhode Island, the son of William and Susannah (Gardner) Angel. In 1792, he moved with his parents to a farm in that part of Richfield, New York, which was separated as the Town of Exeter in 1799, and attended the common schools while working on the family farm. In 1807, he began attending Dr. Buckingham's Grammar School. Angel also briefly studied medicine.

== Career ==
In 1809, Angel was heard as a witness at a trial where William Dowse, a lawyer from the county seat Cooperstown, appeared for the defense. After the trial, Angel was hired by Dowse as a handyman and, while working for Dowse, he read law and became a clerk in Dowse's office.

After Dowse's death, Angel continued to study law with Farrand Stranahan, and in 1816 entered the office of William Welton in Sherburne, Chenango County, New York. The next year, he was taken into partnership by Luther Elderkin, a lawyer of Burlington, and was admitted to the bar. Elderkin absconded with his clients' money, and left Angel to refund them. In this way, Angel took over Elderkin's office, practicing at Burlington until 1833. Angel was Surrogate of Otsego County from 1821 to 1824.

After the death of his first wife, Angel married Clarissa English and they had ten children, among them James R. Angel (1836–1899) and Texas Angel (1839–1903, a lawyer in Hailey, Idaho, and a Populist contender for U.S. Senator from Idaho in 1897).

=== Congress ===
Angel was elected as a Jacksonian to the 19th, 21st and 22nd United States Congresses, holding office from March 4, 1825, to March 3, 1827, and from March 4, 1829, to March 3, 1833. Afterwards he removed to Hammondsport and resumed the practice of law in partnership with Morris Brown. At this time, Martin Grover studied law with Angel, first in Burlington, then in Hammondsport. Grover was admitted to the bar, and commenced practice in Angelica, New York. In 1835, Angel followed Grover to Angelica, and practiced law in partnership with Grover until 1843. From 1843 to 1847, he practiced law in partnership with his son Wilkes Angel. He was a delegate to the New York State Constitutional Convention of 1846. Becoming First Judge and Surrogate of the Allegany County Court, he served from 1847 to 1851.

== Personal life ==
In 1812, Angel married Emily P. English (1790–1822) and they had several children, among them William P. Angel (1813–1869) and Wilkes Angel (1817–1889).

Angel died on August 13, 1858, in Angelica, Allegany County, New York; and was buried at the Until the Day Dawn Cemetery there.

== Sources ==
- United States Congress. "William G. Angel (id: A000256)". Biographical Directory of the United States Congress. [confuses Richfield with Litchfield (in Herkimer Co.)] [gives wrong death month "August"]
- The American Biographical Sketch Book by William Hunt (pages 86f)
- The Bench and Bar of New-York by Lucien Brock Proctor (1870; pages 728ff) [says he was a Jacksonian in the 19th Congress, page 743]
- The New York Civil List compiled by Franklin Benjamin Hough (pages 71f, 358 and 416; Weed, Parsons and Co., 1858)
- DEATH LIST OF A DAY;..."Ex-Justice James R. Angel" in NYT on October 5, 1899
- WILKES ANGEL in Biographical Sketches of the State Officers and Members of the Legislature of the State of New York] by William D. Murphy (1863; pages 42f) [says his father died in October 1858]
- No Choice in Idaho in NYT on January 17, 1897
- Angel genealogy at GenForum
- ANGELICA COLLECTANEA & OBITUARIES compiled by L. L. Stillwell, at RootsWeb [gives October 13 as death date]

U.S. House of Representatives
Preceded by Isaac Williams, Jr.	Member of the U.S. House of Representatives from New York's 13th congressional district 1825–1827	Succeeded by Samuel Chase
Preceded by Samuel Chase	Member of the U.S. House of Representatives from New York's 13th congressional district 1829–1833	Succeeded by Reuben Whallon
