= Wilkes Angel =

American lawyer and politician

Wilkes Angel (February 26, 1817 in Exeter, Otsego County, New York – February 1889) was an American lawyer and politician from New York.

== Life ==
He was the son of William G. Angel and Emily P. (English) Angel (1790–1822). In 1833, he removed with his father to Hammondsport, New York, and in 1835 to Angelica, New York. He attended the common schools, studied law with his father, was admitted to the bar, and practiced in Angelica.

He was District Attorney of Allegany County from 1841 to 1844. On December 23, 1841, he married Hannah Marble. He was Supervisor of Angelica in 1849, 1850 and 1861. He was a Republican member of the New York State Assembly (Allegany Co., 1st D.) in 1861. He was a member of the New York State Senate (30th D.) from 1862 to 1865, sitting in the 85th, 86th, 87th and 88th New York State Legislatures.

In 1859, the county seat of Allegany County was transferred to Belmont, and after his tenure in the State Senate Angel moved his law practice there. In 1876, he was appointed Receiver of the Belmont and Buffalo Railroad.

New York State Prison Inspector William P. Angel; Washington Territorial Council member James R. Angel (1836–1899); and Texas Angel (1839–1903), a lawyer in Hailey, Idaho, and Populist contender for U.S. Senator from Idaho in 1897); were his brothers.

New York State Assembly
Preceded by William M. Smith	New York State Assembly; Allegany County, 1st District; 1861	Succeeded by Alvah E. Cruttenden
New York State Senate
Preceded by David H. Abell	New York State Senate; 30th District; 1862-1865	Succeeded by Wolcott J. Humphrey
