= Jim Angel =

Australian radio news presenter

James Bryson Angel (25 June 1940 – 24 December 2007) was an Australian radio news presenter. During a career spanning more than four decades, he presented the news on Sydney radio stations 2SM, 2UE, 2GB and 2CH, and many affiliated radio stations around Australia. He worked on-air with radio personalities such as John Laws and Alan Jones. After retirement in 2001, he joined community radio station Highland FM in Bowral as a volunteer breakfast announcer. Angel died on Christmas Eve 2007 at his home in the Southern Highlands after suffering a stroke.

== Tributes ==
- The Premier of New South Wales, Morris Iemma, described Angel as a radio icon, saying "many people grew up listening to Jim read the news. Jim was a true professional and a real one of a kind. He will be sorely missed."
- 2UE program director Greg Byrnes stated that "with radio stations packed with big voices and big egos, he was the exception: he was a big voice with no ego."
- 2GB current affairs director Jason Morrison, said "for him every news bulletin was opening night. He was the most unlikely star at the station. He never really understood how many people were aware of who he was and what he did. He set the standard of the way news was presented."
