= William P. Angel =

American politician

William Pitt Angel (February 2, 1813 – February 8, 1869) was an American lawyer and politician from New York.

== Life ==
He was born in Cooperstown, New York, the son of William G. Angel and Emily P. (English) Angel (1790–1822). He practiced law at Olean. He was District Attorney of Cattaraugus County from 1845 to 1850 and from 1857 to 1859.

In 1848, he ran on the Barnburners/Free Soil ticket for Inspector of State Prisons, but was defeated by Whig Alexander H. Wells. In 1850, he ran again, this time on the Democratic and Anti-Rent tickets, and was elected, being in office from 1851 to 1853. On February 20, 1851, he married Laura Eliza Bigelow (1826–1872).

He was a member of the New York State Assembly (Cattaraugus Co., 1st D.) in 1865. Afterwards he removed to Morrisania, then in Westchester County, and practiced law there. In 1868 he formed a partnership with his brother James R. Angel (1836–1899) but died the next year.

New York State Senator Wilkes Angel (1817–1889) and Texas Angel (1839–1903, a lawyer in Hailey, Idaho, and a Populist contender for U.S. Senator from Idaho in 1897) were also his brothers.

== Sources ==
- The New York Civil List compiled by Franklin Benjamin Hough (pages 45 and 370; Weed, Parsons and Co., 1858)
- The New York Civil List compiled by Franklin Benjamin Hough, Stephen C. Hutchins and Edgar Albert Werner (1867; pages 411, 501 and 507)
- Angel genealogy at Gen Forum
- History and Genealogy of the Pomeroy Family by Albert Alonzo Pomeroy (page 609)

New York State Assembly
Preceded by Smith Parish	New York State Assembly; Cattaraugus County, 1st District; 1865	Succeeded by William McVey
