= James R. Angel =

American lawyer and politician

James R. Angel (February 12, 1836, in Angelica, Allegany County, New York – October 4, 1899, in The Bronx, New York City) was an American lawyer and politician from Washington Territory and New York.

== Life ==
He was the son of William G. Angel (1790–1858) and Clarissa (English) Angel. In 1858, he moved to California, and later to Washington Territory. In 1862, he was elected to a three-year term in the Washington Territorial Council (the forerunner of the Washington State Senate), but attended only the session of 1863, then resigned and returned to Sacramento.

In 1865, he returned to New York, studied law with his brother Wilkes Angel (1817–1889), was admitted to the bar at Buffalo in 1867, and commenced practice in partnership with his brother Wilkes at Belmont. In 1868, he removed to Morrisania, then in Westchester County, and resumed his law practice there in partnership with his brother William P. Angel (1813–1869). On May 21, 1871, he married Addie L. Bigelow, and they had two daughters.

In 1874, Morrisania was annexed by New York City, becoming part of the 23rd Ward. In November 1873, expecting the annexation, Angel ran on the Republican ticket for Civil Justice of the Tenth Judicial District of the city, but was defeated by Tammany man John Flanagan. In November 1879, Angel ran again and was elected to a six-year term. In 1885, Angel was not re-nominated by the Republicans and ran as an Independent for re-election, but was defeated.

He died of apoplexy at his home at 1,274 Franklin Ave. in The Bronx.

Texas Angel (1839–1903) a lawyer in Hailey, Idaho, and a Populist contender for U.S. Senator from Idaho in 1897 was his brother.

Washington State Senate
Preceded by Paul K. Hubbs	Washington Territorial Council, Jefferson and Clallam counties 1863	Succeeded by Jacob J. H. Van Bokkelen
