= Clerk of the New York Court of Appeals =

Former elected position (1847–1870)

The Clerk of the New York Court of Appeals was one of the statewide elected officials in New York from 1847 to 1870. He was also ex officio a clerk of the New York Supreme Court. The office was created by the New York State Constitution of 1846.

The first Clerk was elected at the 1847 New York special judicial election, and took office on July 5, 1847, when the Court of Appeals succeeded the Court for the Correction of Errors and the Court of Chancery.

== List ==
Name	Took office	Left office	Party	Notes
Charles S. Benton	July 5, 1847	December 31, 1853	Democratic	two terms; elected on the Democratic ticket in 1847, and on the Democratic and Anti-Rent tickets in 1850
Benjamin F. Harwood	January 1, 1854	March 30, 1856	Whig	died in office
Russell F. Hicks	March 30, 1856	December 31, 1859	Republican	Deputy Clerk under Harwood, then elected
Charles Hughes	January 1, 1860	December 31, 1862	Republican/American	
Frederick A. Tallmadge	January 1, 1863	December 31, 1865	Dem./Const. Union	
Patrick Henry Jones	January 1, 1866	December 31, 1868	Republican	
Edwin O. Perrin	January 1, 1869	December 19, 1888	Democratic	re-appointed after the re-organization of the Court in 1870, died in office
Gorham Parks	January 25, 1889	October 26, 1897	Democratic	(son of Gorham Parks), died in office
William Henry Shankland, Jr.	November 23, 1897	February 27, 1909	Republican	Son of William H. Shankland, deputy under Gorham Parks, acting Clerk from 10/26-11/23/1897, died in office
Richard M. Barber	–1921–			
Joseph W. Bellacosa	1975	1983		Associate Judge of the Court of Appeals 1987-2000
Donald Sheraw	1983			
Stuart M. Cohen	November 15, 1996	November 23, 2010		
Andrew Klein	November 24, 2010	incumbent		
