= List of former United States representatives (C) =

This is a complete list of former United States representatives whose last names begin with the letter C.

== Number of years and terms the member has served ==
The number of years the representative/delegate has served in Congress indicates the number of terms the representative/delegate has. Note the representative/delegate can also serve non-consecutive terms if the representative/delegate loses election and wins re-election to the House.

- 2 years – 1 or 2 terms
- 4 years – 2 or 3 terms
- 6 years – 3 or 4 terms
- 8 years – 4 or 5 terms
- 10 years – 5 or 6 terms
- 12 years – 6 or 7 terms
- 14 years – 7 or 8 terms
- 16 years – 8 or 9 terms
- 18 years – 9 or 10 terms
- 20 years – 10 or 11 terms
- 22 years – 11 or 12 terms
- 24 years – 12 or 13 terms
- 26 years – 13 or 14 terms
- 28 years – 14 or 15 terms
- 30 years – 15 or 16 terms
- 32 years – 16 or 17 terms
- 34 years – 17 or 18 terms
- 36 years – 18 or 19 terms
- 38 years – 19 or 20 terms
- 40 years – 20 or 21 terms
- 42 years – 21 or 22 terms
- 44 years – 22 or 23 terms
- 46 years – 23 or 24 terms
- 48 years – 24 or 25 terms
- 50 years – 25 or 26 terms
- 52 years – 26 or 27 terms
- 54 years – 27 or 28 terms
- 56 years – 28 or 29 terms
- 58 years – 29 or 30 terms

Name	Term	State/ Territory	Party	Lifespan
Thomas Banks Cabaniss	1893–1895	Georgia	Democratic	1835–1915
Earle Cabell	1965–1973	Texas	Democratic	1906–1975
Edward C. Cabell	1845–1846; 1847–1853	Florida	Whig	1816–1896
George Cabell	1875–1887	Virginia	Democratic	1836–1906
Samuel Jordan Cabell	1795–1803	Virginia	Democratic-Republican	1756–1818
Benjamin T. Cable	1891–1893	Illinois	Democratic	1853–1923
John L. Cable	1921–1925; 1929–1933	Ohio	Republican	1884–1971
Joseph Cable	1849–1853	Ohio	Democratic	1801–1880
Cornelius A. Cadmus	1891–1895	New Jersey	Democratic	1844–1902
John Cadwalader	1855–1857	Pennsylvania	Democratic	1805–1879
Lambert Cadwalader	1789–1791; 1793–1795	New Jersey	Pro-Administration	1742–1823
Claude E. Cady	1933–1935	Michigan	Democratic	1878–1953
Daniel Cady	1815–1817	New York	Federalist	1773–1859
John W. Cady	1823–1825	New York	Democratic-Republican	1790–1854
Patrick T. Caffery	1969–1973	Louisiana	Democratic	1932–2013
Harry Cage	1833–1835	Mississippi	Democratic	1795–1858
William T. Cahill	1959–1970	New Jersey	Republican	1912–1996
William Cahoon	1829–1833	Vermont	Anti-Masonic	1774–1833
Richard H. Cain	1873–1875; 1877–1879	South Carolina	Republican	1825–1887
John Thomas Caine	1882–1893	Utah	Democratic	1829–1911
Henry L. Cake	1867–1871	Pennsylvania	Republican	1827–1899
William M. Calder	1905–1915	New York	Republican	1869–1945
William A. Calderhead	1895–1897; 1899–1911	Kansas	Republican	1844–1928
Andrew Jackson Caldwell	1883–1887	Tennessee	Democratic	1837–1906
Ben F. Caldwell	1899–1905; 1907–1909	Illinois	Democratic	1848–1924
C. Pope Caldwell	1915–1921	New York	Democratic	1875–1940
George Caldwell	1843–1845; 1849–1851	Kentucky	Democratic	1814–1866
Greene Washington Caldwell	1841–1843	North Carolina	Democratic	1806–1864
James Caldwell	1813–1817	Ohio	Democratic-Republican	1770–1838
John A. Caldwell	1889–1894	Ohio	Republican	1852–1927
John Henry Caldwell	1873–1877	Alabama	Democratic	1826–1902
John W. Caldwell	1877–1883	Kentucky	Democratic	1837–1903
Joseph Pearson Caldwell	1849–1853	North Carolina	Whig	1808–1853
Millard Caldwell	1933–1941	Florida	Democratic	1897–1984
Patrick C. Caldwell	1841–1843	South Carolina	Democratic	1801–1855
Robert Porter Caldwell	1871–1873	Tennessee	Democratic	1821–1885
William Parker Caldwell	1875–1879	Tennessee	Democratic	1832–1903
Thomas Cale	1907–1909	Alaska	Independent	1848–1941
John Calhoon	1827; 1835–1837	Kentucky	National Republican	1793–1852
John Calhoon	1837–1839	Kentucky	Whig	1793–1852
John C. Calhoun	1811–1817	South Carolina	Democratic-Republican	1782–1850
Joseph Calhoun	1807–1811	South Carolina	Democratic-Republican	1750–1817
William B. Calhoun	1835–1837	Massachusetts	National Republican	1796–1865
William B. Calhoun	1837–1843	Massachusetts	Whig	1796–1865
Hervey C. Calkin	1869–1871	New York	Democratic	1828–1913
William H. Calkins	1877–1884	Indiana	Republican	1842–1894
Jacob Call	1824–1825	Indiana	Democratic-Republican	????–1826
Richard K. Call	1823–1825	Florida	None	1792–1862
James Yancy Callahan	1897–1899	Oklahoma	Free Silver	1852–1935
Sonny Callahan	1985–2003	Alabama	Republican	1932–2021
Clair A. Callan	1965–1967	Nebraska	Democratic	1920–2005
Bo Callaway	1965–1967	Georgia	Republican	1927–2014
Oscar Callaway	1911–1917	Texas	Democratic	1872–1947
John Benton Callis	1868–1869	Alabama	Republican	1828–1898
Charles Benedict Calvert	1861–1863	Maryland	Unionist	1808–1864
Samuel Calvin	1849–1851	Pennsylvania	Whig	1811–1890
Churchill C. Cambreleng	1821–1825	New York	Democratic-Republican	1786–1862
Churchill C. Cambreleng	1825–1839	New York	Democratic	1786–1862
Ralph H. Cameron	1909–1912	Arizona	Democratic	1863–1953
Ronald B. Cameron	1963–1967	California	Democratic	1927–2006
Anthony Caminetti	1891–1895	California	Democratic	1854–1923
A. Sidney Camp	1939–1954	Georgia	Democratic	1892–1954
Dave Camp	1991–2015	Michigan	Republican	1953–present
John H. Camp	1877–1883	New York	Republican	1840–1892
John Newbold Camp	1969–1975	Oklahoma	Republican	1908–1987
Albert J. Campbell	1899–1901	Montana	Democratic	1857–1907
Alexander Campbell	1875–1877	Illinois	Independent	1814–1898
Ben Nighthorse Campbell	1987–1993	Colorado	Democratic	1933–2025
Brookins Campbell	1853	Tennessee	Democratic	1808–1853
Carroll A. Campbell Jr.	1979–1987	South Carolina	Republican	1940–2005
Courtney W. Campbell	1953–1955	Florida	Democratic	1895–1971
Ed H. Campbell	1929–1933	Iowa	Republican	1882–1969
Felix Campbell	1883–1891	New York	Democratic	1829–1902
George W. Campbell	1803–1809	Tennessee	Democratic-Republican	1769–1848
Guy E. Campbell	1917–1923	Pennsylvania	Democratic	1871–1940
Guy E. Campbell	1923–1933	Pennsylvania	Republican	1871–1940
Howard E. Campbell	1945–1947	Pennsylvania	Republican	1890–1971
Jacob M. Campbell	1877–1879; 1881–1887	Pennsylvania	Republican	1821–1888
James E. Campbell	1884–1889	Ohio	Democratic	1843–1924
James Hepburn Campbell	1855–1857	Pennsylvania	Oppositionist	1820–1895
James Hepburn Campbell	1859–1863	Pennsylvania	Republican	1820–1895
James R. Campbell	1897–1899	Illinois	Democratic	1853–1924
John Campbell	1801–1811	Maryland	Federalist	1765–1828
John Campbell	1829–1831	South Carolina	Democratic	1???–1845
John Campbell	1837–1839	South Carolina	Nullifier	1???–1845
John Campbell	1839–1845	South Carolina	Democratic	1???–1845
John Campbell	2005–2015	California	Republican	1955–present
John G. Campbell	1879–1881	Arizona	Democratic	1827–1903
John Hull Campbell	1845–1847	Pennsylvania	American	1800–1868
John P. Campbell Jr.	1855–1857	Kentucky	American	1820–1888
John Wilson Campbell	1817–1825	Ohio	Democratic-Republican	1782–1833
John Wilson Campbell	1825–1827	Ohio	National Republican	1782–1833
Lewis D. Campbell	1849–1855	Ohio	Whig	1811–1882
Lewis D. Campbell	1855–1857	Ohio	Oppositionist	1811–1882
Lewis D. Campbell	1857–1858	Ohio	Republican	1811–1882
Lewis D. Campbell	1871–1873	Ohio	Democratic	1811–1882
Philip P. Campbell	1903–1923	Kansas	Republican	1862–1941
Robert B. Campbell	1823–1825	South Carolina	Democratic-Republican	????–1862
Robert B. Campbell	1834–1837	South Carolina	Nullifier	????–1862
Samuel Campbell	1821–1823	New York	Democratic-Republican	1773–1853
Thomas Jefferson Campbell	1841–1843	Tennessee	Whig	1786–1850
Thompson Campbell	1851–1853	Illinois	Democratic	1811–1868
Timothy J. Campbell	1885–1889; 1891–1895	New York	Democratic	1840–1904
Tom Campbell	1989–1993; 1995–2001	California	Republican	1952–present
William B. Campbell	1837–1843	Tennessee	Whig	1807–1867
William B. Campbell	1866–1867	Tennessee	Unionist	1807–1867
William W. Campbell	1845–1847	New York	American	1806–1881
William Wildman Campbell	1905–1907	Ohio	Republican	1853–1927
Charles Canady	1993–2001	Florida	Republican	1954–present
Richard S. Canby	1847–1849	Ohio	Whig	1808–1895
Allen D. Candler	1883–1891	Georgia	Democratic	1834–1910
Ezekiel S. Candler Jr.	1901–1921	Mississippi	Democratic	1862–1944
John W. Candler	1881–1883; 1889–1891	Massachusetts	Republican	1828–1903
Milton A. Candler	1875–1879	Georgia	Democratic	1837–1909
Gordon Canfield	1941–1961	New Jersey	Republican	1898–1972
Harry C. Canfield	1923–1933	Indiana	Democratic	1875–1945
Chris Cannon	1997–2009	Utah	Republican	1950–2024
Clarence Cannon	1923–1964	Missouri	Democratic	1879–1964
Frank J. Cannon	1895–1896	Utah	Republican	1859–1933
George Q. Cannon	1873–1882	Utah	Democratic	1827–1901
Joseph Gurney Cannon	1873–1891; 1893–1913; 1915–1923	Illinois	Republican	1836–1926
Marion Cannon	1893–1895	California	Populist	1834–1920
Newton Cannon	1814–1817; 1819–1823	Tennessee	Democratic-Republican	1781–1841
Pat Cannon	1939–1947	Florida	Democratic	1904–1966
Raymond J. Cannon	1933–1939	Wisconsin	Democratic	1894–1951
Quico Canseco	2011–2013	Texas	Republican	1949–present
Eric Cantor	2001–2014	Virginia	Republican	1963–present
Jacob A. Cantor	1913–1915	New York	Democratic	1854–1921
J. Campbell Cantrill	1909–1923	Kentucky	Democratic	1870–1923
Maria Cantwell	1993–1995	Washington	Democratic	1958–present
Joseph Cao	2009–2011	Louisiana	Republican	1967–present
James Capehart	1891–1895	West Virginia	Democratic	1847–1921
Hugh Caperton	1813–1815	Virginia	Federalist	1781–1847
Shelley Moore Capito	2001–2015	West Virginia	Republican	1953–present
Louis Capozzoli	1941–1945	New York	Democratic	1901–1982
Lois Capps	1998–2017	California	Democratic	1938–present
Walter Capps	1997	California	Democratic	1934–1997
Adin B. Capron	1897–1911	Rhode Island	Republican	1841–1911
John H. Capstick	1915–1918	New Jersey	Republican	1856–1918
Mike Capuano	1999–2013	Massachusetts	Democratic	1952–present
Bruce F. Caputo	1977–1979	New York	Republican	1943–present
Yadira Caraveo	2023–2025	Colorado	Democratic	1980–present
Thaddeus H. Caraway	1913–1921	Arkansas	Democratic	1871–1931
Cap R. Carden	1931–1935	Kentucky	Democratic	1866–1935
Tony Cárdenas	2013–2025	California	Democratic	1963–present
Ben Cardin	1987–2007	Maryland	Democratic	1943–present
Dennis Cardoza	2003–2012	California	Democratic	1959–present
John F. Carew	1913–1929	New York	Democratic	1873–1951
Hugh Carey	1961–1974	New York	Democratic	1919–2011
John Carey	1859–1861	Ohio	Republican	1792–1875
Joseph M. Carey	1885–1890	Wyoming	Republican	1845–1924
Jerry Carl	2021–2025	Alabama	Republican	1958–present
Ezra C. Carleton	1883–1887	Michigan	Democratic	1838–1911
Peter Carleton	1807–1809	New Hampshire	Democratic-Republican	1755–1828
Patrick J. Carley	1927–1935	New York	Democratic	1866–1936
John S. Carlile	1855–1857	Virginia	American	1817–1878
John S. Carlile	1861	Virginia	Unionist	1817–1878
Charles Creighton Carlin	1907–1919	Virginia	Democratic	1866–1938
John G. Carlisle	1877–1890	Kentucky	Democratic	1834–1910
Cliffard D. Carlson	1972–1973	Illinois	Republican	1915–1977
Frank Carlson	1935–1947	Kansas	Republican	1893–1987
Henry H. Carlton	1887–1891	Georgia	Democratic	1835–1905
F. Ertel Carlyle	1949–1957	North Carolina	Democratic	1897–1960
Edward W. Carmack	1897–1901	Tennessee	Democratic	1858–1908
Gregory W. Carman	1981–1983	New York	Republican	1937–2020
Archibald H. Carmichael	1933–1937	Alabama	Democratic	1864–1947
Richard Bennett Carmichael	1833–1835	Maryland	Democratic	1807–1884
A. S. J. Carnahan	1945–1947; 1949–1961	Missouri	Democratic	1897–1968
Russ Carnahan	2005–2013	Missouri	Democratic	1958–present
Thomas P. Carnes	1793–1795	Georgia	Anti-Administration	1762–1822
Charles J. Carney	1970–1979	Ohio	Democratic	1913–1987
Chris Carney	2007–2011	Pennsylvania	Democratic	1959–present
John Carney	2011–2017	Delaware	Democratic	1956–present
William Carney	1979–1985; 1985–1987	New York	Conservative; Republican	1942–2017
Cyrus C. Carpenter	1879–1883	Iowa	Republican	1829–1898
Davis Carpenter	1853–1855	New York	Whig	1799–1878
Edmund N. Carpenter	1925–1927	Pennsylvania	Republican	1865–1952
Levi D. Carpenter	1844–1845	New York	Democratic	1802–1856
Lewis C. Carpenter	1874–1875	South Carolina	Republican	1836–1908
Randolph Carpenter	1933–1937	Kansas	Democratic	1894–1956
Terry Carpenter	1933–1935	Nebraska	Democratic	1900–1978
Tom Carper	1983–1993	Delaware	Democratic	1947–present
Bob Carr	1975–1981; 1983–1995	Michigan	Democratic	1943–2024
Francis Carr	1812–1813	Massachusetts	Democratic-Republican	1751–1821
James Carr	1815–1817	Massachusetts	Federalist	1777–1818
John Carr	1831–1837; 1839–1841	Indiana	Democratic	1793–1845
Nathan T. Carr	1876–1877	Indiana	Democratic	1833–1885
Wooda N. Carr	1913–1915	Pennsylvania	Democratic	1871–1953
Chester O. Carrier	1943–1945	Kentucky	Republican	1897–1980
Joseph L. Carrigg	1951–1959	Pennsylvania	Republican	1901–1989
Charles H. Carroll	1843–1847	New York	Whig	1794–1865
Daniel Carroll	1789–1791	Maryland	Pro-Administration	1730–1796
James Carroll	1839–1841	Maryland	Democratic	1791–1873
John A. Carroll	1947–1951	Colorado	Democratic	1901–1983
John M. Carroll	1871–1873	New York	Democratic	1823–1901
Brad Carson	2001–2005	Oklahoma	Democratic	1967–present
Henderson H. Carson	1943–1945; 1947–1949	Ohio	Republican	1893–1971
Julia Carson	1997–2007	Indiana	Democratic	1938–2007
Samuel Price Carson	1825–1833	North Carolina	Democratic	1798–1838
William Leighton Carss	1919–1921; 1925–1929	Minnesota	Farmer-Labor	1865–1931
Albert E. Carter	1925–1945	California	Republican	1881–1964
Charles D. Carter	1907–1927	Oklahoma	Democratic	1868–1929
John Carter	1822–1825	South Carolina	Democratic-Republican	1792–1850
John Carter	1825–1829	South Carolina	Democratic	1792–1850
Luther C. Carter	1859–1861	New York	Republican	1805–1875
Steven V. Carter	1959	Iowa	Democratic	1915–1959
Thomas H. Carter	1889; 1889–1891	Montana	Republican	1854–1911
Tim Lee Carter	1965–1981	Kentucky	Republican	1910–1987
Timothy J. Carter	1837–1838	Maine	Democratic	1800–1838
Vincent Carter	1929–1935	Wyoming	Republican	1891–1972
William Blount Carter	1835–1837	Tennessee	National Republican	1792–1848
William Blount Carter	1837–1841	Tennessee	Whig	1792–1848
William Henry Carter	1915–1919	Massachusetts	Republican	1864–1955
David Kellogg Cartter	1849–1853	Ohio	Democratic	1812–1887
Matt Cartwright	2013–2025	Pennsylvania	Democratic	1961–present
Wilburn Cartwright	1927–1943	Oklahoma	Democratic	1892–1979
Asher G. Caruth	1887–1895	Kentucky	Democratic	1844–1907
Robert L. Caruthers	1841–1843	Tennessee	Whig	1800–1882
Samuel Caruthers	1853–1855	Missouri	Whig	1820–1860
Samuel Caruthers	1855–1857	Missouri	Oppositionist	1820–1860
Samuel Caruthers	1857–1859	Missouri	Democratic	1820–1860
George Cary	1823–1825	Georgia	Democratic-Republican	1789–1843
George Cary	1825–1827	Georgia	Democratic	1789–1843
George B. Cary	1841–1843	Virginia	Democratic	1811–1850
Glover H. Cary	1931–1936	Kentucky	Democratic	1885–1936
Jeremiah E. Cary	1843–1845	New York	Democratic	1803–1888
Samuel Fenton Cary	1867–1869	Ohio	Independent Republican	1814–1900
Shepard Cary	1844–1845	Maine	Democratic	1805–1866
William J. Cary	1907–1919	Wisconsin	Republican	1865–1934
Charles Case	1857–1861	Indiana	Republican	1817–1883
Clifford P. Case	1945–1953	New Jersey	Republican	1904–1982
Francis Case	1937–1951	South Dakota	Republican	1896–1962
Walter Case	1819–1821	New York	Democratic-Republican	1776–1859
John J. Casey	1913–1917; 1919–1921; 1923–1925; 1927–1929	Pennsylvania	Democratic	1875–1929
Joseph Casey	1849–1851	Pennsylvania	Whig	1814–1879
Joseph E. Casey	1935–1943	Massachusetts	Democratic	1898–1980
Levi Casey	1803–1807	South Carolina	Democratic-Republican	c. 1752 – 1807
Robert R. Casey	1959–1976	Texas	Democratic	1915–1986
Samuel L. Casey	1862–1863	Kentucky	Unionist	1821–1902
Zadok Casey	1833–1841	Illinois	Democratic	1796–1862
Zadok Casey	1841–1843	Illinois	Independent Democrat	1796–1862
John Caskie	1851–1859	Virginia	Democratic	1821–1869
Thomas J. Cason	1873–1877	Indiana	Republican	1828–1901
George Cassedy	1821–1825	New Jersey	Democratic-Republican	1783–1842
George Cassedy	1825–1827	New Jersey	Democratic	1783–1842
Henry B. Cassel	1901–1909	Pennsylvania	Republican	1855–1926
Bill Cassidy	2009–2015	Louisiana	Republican	1957–present
George W. Cassidy	1881–1885	Nevada	Democratic	1836–1892
James H. Cassidy	1909–1911	Ohio	Republican	1869–1926
John W. Cassingham	1901–1905	Ohio	Democratic	1840–1930
Bryant T. Castellow	1932–1937	Georgia	Democratic	1876–1962
Curtis H. Castle	1897–1899	California	Populist	1848–1928
James Castle	1891–1893	Minnesota	Democratic	1836–1903
Mike Castle	1993–2011	Delaware	Republican	1939–2025
George A. Castor	1904–1906	Pennsylvania	Republican	1855–1906
Lucien B. Caswell	1875–1883; 1885–1891	Wisconsin	Republican	1827–1919
Thomas C. Catchings	1885–1901	Mississippi	Democratic	1847–1927
George W. Cate	1875–1877	Wisconsin	Democratic	1825–1905
William H. Cate	1889–1890; 1891–1893	Arkansas	Democratic	1839–1899
Charles W. Cathcart	1845–1849	Indiana	Democratic	1809–1888
George S. Catlin	1843–1845	Connecticut	Democratic	1808–1851
Theron E. Catlin	1911–1912	Missouri	Republican	1878–1960
Thomas B. Catron	1895–1897	New Mexico	Republican	1840–1921
Bernard G. Caulfield	1875–1877	Illinois	Democratic	1828–1887
Henry S. Caulfield	1907–1909	Missouri	Republican	1873–1966
John W. Causey	1891–1895	Delaware	Democratic	1841–1908
John Causin	1843–1845	Maryland	Whig	1811–1861
Anthony Cavalcante	1949–1951	Pennsylvania	Democratic	1897–1966
James M. Cavanaugh	1858–1859; 1867–1871	Minnesota; Montana	Democratic	1823–1879
John J. Cavanaugh III	1977–1981	Nebraska	Democratic	1945–present
Peter A. Cavicchia	1931–1937	New Jersey	Republican	1879–1967
Madison Cawthorn	2021–2023	North Carolina	Republican	1995–present
Don Cazayoux	2008–2009	Louisiana	Democratic	1964–present
Al Cederberg	1953–1978	Michigan	Republican	1918–2006
Emanuel Celler	1923–1973	New York	Democratic	1888–1981
John Cessna	1869–1871; 1873–1875	Pennsylvania	Republican	1821–1893
Steve Chabot	1995–2009; 2011–2023	Ohio	Republican	1953–present
Jonathan Chace	1881–1885	Rhode Island	Republican	1829–1917
E. Wallace Chadwick	1947–1949	Pennsylvania	Republican	1884–1969
Calvin C. Chaffee	1855–1857	Massachusetts	American	1811–1896
Calvin C. Chaffee	1857–1859	Massachusetts	Republican	1811–1896
Jerome B. Chaffee	1871–1875	Colorado	Republican	1825–1886
Jason Chaffetz	2009–2017	Utah	Republican	1967–present
James Ronald Chalmers	1877–1882	Mississippi	Democratic	1831–1898
James Ronald Chalmers	1884–1885	Mississippi	Independent	1831–1898
William W. Chalmers	1921–1923; 1925–1931	Ohio	Republican	1861–1944
Charles E. Chamberlain	1957–1974	Michigan	Republican	1917–2002
Ebenezer M. Chamberlain	1853–1855	Indiana	Democratic	1805–1861
Jacob P. Chamberlain	1861–1863	New York	Republican	1802–1878
John Curtis Chamberlain	1809–1811	New Hampshire	Federalist	1772–1834
William Chamberlain	1803–1805; 1809–1811	Vermont	Federalist	1755–1828
David Chambers	1821–1823	Ohio	Democratic-Republican	1780–1864
George Chambers	1833–1837	Pennsylvania	Anti-Masonic	1786–1866
John Chambers	1828–1829; 1835–1837	Kentucky	National Republican	1780–1852
John Chambers	1837–1839	Kentucky	Whig	1780–1852
Saxby Chambliss	1995–2003	Georgia	Republican	1943–present
Edwin V. Champion	1937–1939	Illinois	Democratic	1890–1976
Epaphroditus Champion	1807–1817	Connecticut	Federalist	1756–1834
Christopher G. Champlin	1797–1801	Rhode Island	Federalist	1768–1840
Ben Chandler	2004–2013	Kentucky	Democratic	1959–present
John Chandler	1805–1809	Massachusetts	Democratic-Republican	1762–1841
Joseph R. Chandler	1849–1855	Pennsylvania	Whig	1792–1880
Rod Chandler	1983–1993	Washington	Republican	1942–present
Thomas Chandler	1829–1833	New Hampshire	Democratic	1772–1866
Thomas A. Chandler	1917–1919; 1921–1923	Oklahoma	Republican	1871–1953
Walter Chandler	1935–1940	Tennessee	Democratic	1887–1967
Walter M. Chandler	1913–1917	New York	Progressive	1867–1935
Walter M. Chandler	1917–1919; 1921–1923	New York	Republican	1867–1935
John Chaney	1833–1839	Ohio	Democratic	1790–1881
John C. Chaney	1905–1909	Indiana	Republican	1853–1940
John Winthrop Chanler	1863–1869	New York	Democratic	1826–1877
William A. Chanler	1899–1901	New York	Democratic	1867–1934
Alfred C. Chapin	1891–1892	New York	Democratic	1848–1936
Chester W. Chapin	1875–1877	Massachusetts	Democratic	1798–1883
Graham H. Chapin	1835–1837	New York	Democratic	1799–1843
Andrew G. Chapman	1881–1883	Maryland	Democratic	1839–1892
Augustus A. Chapman	1843–1847	Virginia	Democratic	1805–1876
Bird Beers Chapman	1855–1857	Nebraska	Democratic	1821–1871
Charles Chapman	1851–1853	Connecticut	Whig	1799–1869
Henry Chapman	1857–1859	Pennsylvania	Democratic	1804–1891
Jim Chapman	1985–1997	Texas	Democratic	1945–present
John Chapman	1797–1799	Pennsylvania	Federalist	1740–1800
John G. Chapman	1845–1849	Maryland	Whig	1798–1856
Pleasant T. Chapman	1905–1911	Illinois	Republican	1854–1931
Reuben Chapman	1835–1847	Alabama	Democratic	1799–1882
Virgil Chapman	1925–1929; 1931–1949	Kentucky	Democratic	1895–1951
William W. Chapman	1838–1840	Iowa	Democratic	1808–1892
Absalom H. Chappell	1843–1845	Georgia	Whig	1801–1878
Bill Chappell	1969–1989	Florida	Democratic	1922–1989
John J. Chappell	1813–1817	South Carolina	Democratic-Republican	1782–1871
Eugene A. Chappie	1981–1987	California	Republican	1920–1992
William B. Charles	1915–1917	New York	Republican	1861–1950
George W. Chase	1853–1855	New York	Whig	????–1867
J. Mitchell Chase	1927–1933	Pennsylvania	Republican	1891–1945
Jackson B. Chase	1955–1957	Nebraska	Republican	1890–1974
Lucien Bonaparte Chase	1845–1849	Tennessee	Democratic	1817–1864
Ray P. Chase	1933–1935	Minnesota	Republican	1880–1948
Samuel Chase	1827–1829	New York	National Republican	1???–1838
Elijah W. Chastain	1851–1853	Georgia	Unionist	1813–1874
Elijah W. Chastain	1853–1855	Georgia	Democratic	1813–1874
R. Thurmond Chatham	1949–1957	North Carolina	Democratic	1896–1957
José Francisco Chaves	1865–1867; 1869–1871	New Mexico	Republican	1833–1904
Dennis Chávez	1931–1935	New Mexico	Democratic	1888–1962
Lori Chavez-DeRemer	2023–2025	Oregon	Republican	1968–present
Joseph B. Cheadle	1887–1891	Indiana	Republican	1842–1904
Henry P. Cheatham	1889–1893	North Carolina	Republican	1857–1935
Richard Cheatham	1837–1839	Tennessee	Whig	1799–1845
Frank Chelf	1945–1967	Kentucky	Democratic	1907–1982
Dick Cheney	1979–1989	Wyoming	Republican	1941–2025
Liz Cheney	2017–2023	Wyoming	Republican	1966–present
John Chenoweth	1941–1949; 1951–1965	Colorado	Republican	1897–1986
Helen Chenoweth-Hage	1995–2001	Idaho	Republican	1938–2006
Sheila Cherfilus-McCormick	2022–2026	Florida	Democratic	1979–present
Chester A. Chesney	1949–1951	Illinois	Democratic	1916–1986
William Chetwood	1836–1837	New Jersey	Whig	1771–1857
Langdon Cheves	1810–1815	South Carolina	Democratic-Republican	1776–1857
Charles A. Chickering	1893–1900	New York	Republican	1843–1900
George M. Chilcott	1867–1869	Colorado	Republican	1828–1891
Thomas Child Jr.	1856–1857	New York	Oppositionist	1818–1869
Travis Childers	2008–2011	Mississippi	Democratic	1958–present
Robert A. Childs	1893–1895	Illinois	Republican	1845–1915
Timothy Childs	1829–1831	New York	Anti-Masonic	1785–1847
Timothy Childs	1835–1837	New York	National Republican	1785–1847
Timothy Childs	1837–1839; 1841–1843	New York	Whig	1785–1847
Samuel Chilton	1843–1845	Virginia	Whig	1804–1867
Thomas Chilton	1827–1831	Kentucky	Democratic	1798–1854
Thomas Chilton	1833–1835	Kentucky	National Republican	1798–1854
Carl R. Chindblom	1919–1933	Illinois	Republican	1870–1956
Joseph Chinn	1831–1835	Virginia	Democratic	1798–1840
Thomas W. Chinn	1839–1841	Louisiana	Whig	1791–1852
Burnett M. Chiperfield	1915–1917; 1930–1933	Illinois	Republican	1870–1940
Robert B. Chiperfield	1939–1963	Illinois	Republican	1899–1971
Daniel Chipman	1815–1816	Vermont	Federalist	1765–1850
J. Logan Chipman	1887–1893	Michigan	Democratic	1830–1893
John Smith Chipman	1845–1847	Michigan	Democratic	1800–1869
Norton P. Chipman	1871–1875	District of Columbia	Republican	1834–1924
Shirley Chisholm	1969–1983	New York	Democratic	1924–2005
Martin Chittenden	1803–1813	Vermont	Federalist	1763–1840
Simeon B. Chittenden	1874–1877	New York	Independent Republican	1814–1889
Simeon B. Chittenden	1877–1881	New York	Republican	1814–1889
Thomas C. Chittenden	1839–1843	New York	Whig	1788–1866
Rufus Choate	1831–1834	Massachusetts	National Republican	1799–1859
Chris Chocola	2003–2007	Indiana	Republican	1962–present
James Chrisman	1853–1855	Kentucky	Democratic	1818–1881
Jon Christensen	1995–1999	Nebraska	Republican	1963–present
Victor Christgau	1929–1933	Minnesota	Republican	1894–1991
Donna Christensen	1997–2015	U.S. Virgin Islands	Democratic	1945–present
Theodore Christianson	1933–1937	Minnesota	Republican	1883–1948
Gabriel Christie	1793–1795	Maryland	Anti-Administration	1756–1808
Gabriel Christie	1795–1797; 1799–1801	Maryland	Democratic-Republican	1756–1808
George H. Christopher	1949–1951; 1955–1959	Missouri	Democratic	1888–1959
Charles A. Christopherson	1919–1933	South Dakota	Republican	1871–1951
Dick Chrysler	1995–1997	Michigan	Republican	1942–present
Earl Chudoff	1949–1958	Pennsylvania	Democratic	1907–1993
Denver S. Church	1913–1919; 1933–1935	California	Democratic	1862–1952
Marguerite Stitt Church	1951–1963	Illinois	Republican	1892–1990
Ralph E. Church	1935–1941; 1943–1950	Illinois	Republican	1883–1950
George B. Churchill	1925	Massachusetts	Republican	1866–1925
John C. Churchill	1867–1871	New York	Republican	1821–1905
William M. Churchwell	1851–1855	Tennessee	Democratic	1826–1862
David Cicilline	2011–2023	Rhode Island	Democratic	1961–present
Bradbury Cilley	1813–1817	New Hampshire	Federalist	1760–1831
Jonathan Cilley	1837–1838	Maine	Democratic	1802–1838
William M. Citron	1935–1939	Connecticut	Democratic	1896–1976
William Claflin	1877–1881	Massachusetts	Republican	1818–1905
Clifton Clagett	1803–1805	New Hampshire	Federalist	1762–1829
Clifton Clagett	1817–1821	New Hampshire	Democratic-Republican	1762–1829
William H. Clagett	1871–1873	Montana	Republican	1838–1901
Frank Clague	1921–1933	Minnesota	Republican	1865–1952
John Francis Hamtramck Claiborne	1835–1838	Mississippi	Democratic	1809–1884
James R. Claiborne	1933–1937	Missouri	Democratic	1882–1944
John Claiborne	1805–1808	Virginia	Democratic-Republican	1777–1808
Nathaniel Claiborne	1825–1835	Virginia	Democratic	1777–1859
Nathaniel Claiborne	1835–1837	Virginia	National Republican	1777–1859
Thomas Claiborne	1793–1795	Virginia	Anti-Administration	1749–1812
Thomas Claiborne	1795–1799; 1801–1805	Virginia	Democratic-Republican	1749–1812
Thomas Claiborne	1817–1819	Tennessee	Democratic-Republican	1780–1856
William C. C. Claiborne	1797–1801	Tennessee	Democratic-Republican	1775–1817
Donald D. Clancy	1961–1977	Ohio	Republican	1921–2007
John Michael Clancy	1889–1895	New York	Democratic	1837–1903
John R. Clancy	1913–1915	New York	Democratic	1859–1932
Robert H. Clancy	1923–1925	Michigan	Democratic	1882–1962
Robert H. Clancy	1927–1933	Michigan	Republican	1882–1962
Asa Clapp	1847–1849	Maine	Democratic	1805–1891
John D. Clardy	1895–1899	Kentucky	Democratic	1828–1918
Kit Clardy	1953–1955	Michigan	Republican	1892–1961
Martin L. Clardy	1879–1889	Missouri	Democratic	1844–1914
Abraham Clark	1791–1794	New Jersey	Pro-Administration	1726–1794
Alvah A. Clark	1877–1881	New Jersey	Democratic	1840–1912
Ambrose W. Clark	1861–1865	New York	Republican	1810–1887
Amos Clark Jr.	1873–1875	New Jersey	Republican	1828–1912
Champ Clark	1893–1895; 1897–1921	Missouri	Democratic	1850–1921
Charles B. Clark	1887–1891	Wisconsin	Republican	1844–1891
Charles N. Clark	1895–1897	Missouri	Republican	1827–1902
Christopher H. Clark	1804–1806	Virginia	Democratic-Republican	1767–1828
Clarence D. Clark	1890–1893	Wyoming	Republican	1851–1930
D. Worth Clark	1935–1939	Idaho	Democratic	1902–1955
Daniel Clark	1806–1809	Orleans	None	c. 1766 – 1813
Ezra Clark Jr.	1855–1857	Connecticut	American	1813–1896
Ezra Clark Jr.	1857–1859	Connecticut	Republican	1813–1896
Frank Clark	1905–1925	Florida	Democratic	1860–1936
Frank M. Clark	1955–1974	Pennsylvania	Democratic	1915–2003
Franklin Clark	1847–1849	Maine	Democratic	1801–1874
Henry Alden Clark	1917–1919	Pennsylvania	Republican	1850–1944
Henry Selby Clark	1845–1847	North Carolina	Democratic	1809–1869
Horace F. Clark	1857–1859	New York	Democratic	1815–1873
Horace F. Clark	1859–1861	New York	Anti-Lecompton Democratic	1815–1873
J. Bayard Clark	1929–1949	North Carolina	Democratic	1882–1959
James Clark	1813–1816	Kentucky	Democratic-Republican	1779–1839
James Clark	1825–1831	Kentucky	National Republican	1779–1839
James West Clark	1815–1817	North Carolina	Democratic-Republican	1779–1843
John Bullock Clark	1857–1861	Missouri	Democratic	1802–1885
John Bullock Clark Jr.	1873–1883	Missouri	Democratic	1831–1903
John C. Clark	1827–1829; 1837	New York	Democratic	1793–1852
John C. Clark	1837–1843	New York	Whig	1793–1852
Lincoln Clark	1851–1853	Iowa	Democratic	1800–1886
Linwood Clark	1929–1931	Maryland	Republican	1876–1965
Lot Clark	1823–1825	New York	Democratic-Republican	1788–1862
Robert Clark	1819–1821	New York	Democratic-Republican	1777–1837
Rush Clark	1877–1879	Iowa	Republican	1834–1879
Samuel Clark	1833–1835	New York	Democratic	1800–1870
Samuel Clark	1853–1855	Michigan	Democratic	1800–1870
Samuel M. Clark	1895–1899	Iowa	Republican	1842–1900
William Clark	1833–1837	Pennsylvania	Anti-Masonic	1774–1851
William Thomas Clark	1870–1872	Texas	Republican	1831–1905
Archibald S. Clarke	1816–1817	New York	Democratic-Republican	1788–1821
Bayard Clarke	1855–1857	New York	Oppositionist	1815–1884
Beverly L. Clarke	1847–1849	Kentucky	Democratic	1809–1860
Charles E. Clarke	1849–1851	New York	Whig	1790–1863
Frank G. Clarke	1897–1901	New Hampshire	Republican	1850–1901
Freeman Clarke	1863–1865; 1871–1875	New York	Republican	1809–1887
Hansen Clarke	2011–2013	Michigan	Democratic	1957–present
James M. Clarke	1983–1985; 1987–1991	North Carolina	Democratic	1917–1999
John Blades Clarke	1875–1879	Kentucky	Democratic	1833–1911
John D. Clarke	1921–1925; 1927–1933	New York	Republican	1873–1933
Marian W. Clarke	1933–1935	New York	Republican	1880–1953
Reader W. Clarke	1865–1869	Ohio	Republican	1812–1872
Richard H. Clarke	1889–1897	Alabama	Democratic	1843–1906
Sidney Clarke	1865–1871	Kansas	Republican	1831–1909
Staley N. Clarke	1841–1843	New York	Whig	1794–1860
Charles R. Clason	1937–1949	Massachusetts	Republican	1890–1985
David G. Classon	1917–1923	Wisconsin	Republican	1870–1930
Don Clausen	1963–1983	California	Republican	1923–2015
Curt Clawson	2014–2017	Florida	Republican	1959–present
Del M. Clawson	1963–1978	California	Republican	1914–1992
Isaiah D. Clawson	1855–1857	New Jersey	Oppositionist	1822–1879
Isaiah D. Clawson	1857–1859	New Jersey	Republican	1822–1879
Bill Clay	1969–2001	Missouri	Democratic	1931–2025
Brutus J. Clay	1863–1865	Kentucky	Unionist	1808–1878
Clement Comer Clay	1829–1835	Alabama	Democratic	1789–1866
Henry Clay	1811–1814; 1815–1821; 1823–1825	Kentucky	Democratic-Republican	1777–1852
James Brown Clay	1857–1859	Kentucky	Democratic	1817–1864
James F. Clay	1883–1885	Kentucky	Democratic	1840–1921
Joseph Clay	1803–1808	Pennsylvania	Democratic-Republican	1769–1811
Lacy Clay	2001–2021	Missouri	Democratic	1956–present
Matthew Clay	1797–1813; 1815	Virginia	Democratic-Republican	1754–1815
Harold K. Claypool	1937–1943	Ohio	Democratic	1886–1958
Horatio C. Claypool	1911–1915; 1917–1919	Ohio	Democratic	1859–1921
Augustin S. Clayton	1832–1835	Georgia	Democratic	1783–1839
Bertram T. Clayton	1899–1901	New York	Democratic	1862–1918
Charles Clayton	1873–1875	California	Republican	1825–1885
Eva Clayton	1992–2003	North Carolina	Democratic	1934–present
Henry D. Clayton Jr.	1897–1914	Alabama	Democratic	1857–1929
Thomas Clayton	1815–1817	Delaware	Federalist	1777–1854
William E. Cleary	1917–1921; 1923–1927	New York	Democratic	1849–1932
Sherrard Clemens	1852–1853; 1857–1861	Virginia	Democratic	1820–1881
Bob Clement	1988–2003	Tennessee	Democratic	1943–present
L. Gary Clemente	1949–1953	New York	Democratic	1908–1968
A. J. Clements	1861–1863	Tennessee	Unionist	1832–1913
Earle C. Clements	1945–1948	Kentucky	Democratic	1896–1985
Isaac Clements	1873–1875	Illinois	Republican	1837–1909
Judson C. Clements	1881–1891	Georgia	Democratic	1846–1917
Newton Nash Clements	1880–1881	Alabama	Democratic	1837–1900
David Clendenin	1814–1817	Ohio	Democratic-Republican	N/A
Chauncey F. Cleveland	1849–1853	Connecticut	Democratic	1799–1887
James Colgate Cleveland	1963–1981	New Hampshire	Republican	1920–1995
Jesse Franklin Cleveland	1835–1839	Georgia	Democratic	1804–1841
Orestes Cleveland	1869–1871	New Jersey	Democratic	1829–1896
Cliff Clevenger	1939–1959	Ohio	Republican	1885–1960
Raymond F. Clevenger	1965–1967	Michigan	Democratic	1926–2016
Charles P. Clever	1867–1869	New Mexico	Democratic	1830–1874
Nathan Clifford	1839–1843	Maine	Democratic	1803–1881
Joseph W. Clift	1868–1869	Georgia	Republican	1837–1908
Duncan Lamont Clinch	1844–1845	Georgia	Whig	1787–1849
Cyrus Cline	1909–1917	Indiana	Democratic	1856–1923
William Clinger	1979–1997	Pennsylvania	Republican	1929–2021
Thomas L. Clingman	1843–1845; 1847–1853	North Carolina	Whig	1812–1897
Thomas L. Clingman	1853–1858	North Carolina	Democratic	1812–1897
George Clinton Jr.	1805–1809	New York	Democratic-Republican	1771–1809
James G. Clinton	1841–1845	New York	Democratic	1804–1849
Roy Clippinger	1945–1949	Illinois	Republican	1886–1962
David Clopton	1859–1861	Alabama	Democratic	1820–1892
John Clopton	1795–1799; 1801–1816	Virginia	Democratic-Republican	1756–1816
Wynne F. Clouse	1921–1923	Tennessee	Republican	1883–1944
Benjamin H. Clover	1891–1893	Kansas	Populist	1837–1899
William K. Clowney	1833–1835; 1837–1839	South Carolina	Nullifier	1797–1851
E. Harold Cluett	1937–1943	New York	Republican	1874–1954
Thomas J. Clunie	1889–1891	California	Democratic	1852–1903
George Clymer	1789–1791	Pennsylvania	Pro-Administration	1739–1813
Hiester Clymer	1873–1881	Pennsylvania	Democratic	1827–1884
Merwin Coad	1957–1963	Iowa	Democratic	1924–2025
Charles Pearce Coady	1913–1921	Maryland	Democratic	1868–1934
Dan Coats	1981–1989	Indiana	Republican	1943–present
Amasa Cobb	1863–1871	Wisconsin	Republican	1823–1905
Clinton L. Cobb	1869–1875	North Carolina	Republican	1842–1879
David Cobb	1793–1795	Massachusetts	Pro-Administration	1748–1830
George T. Cobb	1861–1863	New Jersey	Democratic	1813–1870
Howell Cobb	1807–1812	Georgia	Democratic-Republican	1772–1818
Howell Cobb	1843–1851; 1855–1857	Georgia	Democratic	1815–1868
James E. Cobb	1887–1896	Alabama	Democratic	1835–1903
Seth W. Cobb	1891–1897	Missouri	Democratic	1838–1909
Stephen A. Cobb	1873–1875	Kansas	Republican	1833–1878
Thomas R. Cobb	1877–1887	Indiana	Democratic	1828–1892
Thomas W. Cobb	1817–1821; 1823–1824	Georgia	Democratic-Republican	1784–1830
Williamson R. W. Cobb	1847–1861	Alabama	Democratic	1807–1864
Bill Cobey	1985–1987	North Carolina	Republican	1939–present
Howard Coble	1985–2015	North Carolina	Republican	1931–2015
Frank P. Coburn	1891–1893	Wisconsin	Democratic	1858–1932
John Coburn	1867–1875	Indiana	Republican	1825–1908
Stephen Coburn	1861	Maine	Republican	1817–1882
Tom Coburn	1995–2001	Oklahoma	Republican	1948–2020
Alexander G. Cochran	1875–1877	Pennsylvania	Democratic	1846–1928
Charles F. Cochran	1897–1905	Missouri	Democratic	1846–1906
James Cochran	1797–1799	New York	Federalist	1769–1848
James Cochran	1809–1813	North Carolina	Democratic-Republican	c. 1767 – 1813
John J. Cochran	1926–1947	Missouri	Democratic	1880–1947
Thad Cochran	1973–1978	Mississippi	Republican	1937–2019
Thomas Cunningham Cochran	1927–1935	Pennsylvania	Republican	1877–1957
Aaron Van Schaick Cochrane	1897–1901	New York	Republican	1858–1943
Clark B. Cochrane	1857–1861	New York	Republican	1815–1867
John Cochrane	1857–1861	New York	Democratic	1813–1898
John Alexander Cocke	1819–1825	Tennessee	Democratic-Republican	1772–1854
John Alexander Cocke	1825–1827	Tennessee	Democratic	1772–1854
William Michael Cocke	1845–1849	Tennessee	Whig	1815–1896
Joseph R. Cockerill	1857–1859	Ohio	Democratic	1818–1875
William Bourke Cockran	1887–1889; 1891–1895; 1904–1909; 1921–1923	New York	Democratic	1854–1923
Jeremiah V. Cockrell	1893–1897	Texas	Democratic	1832–1915
William W. Cocks	1905–1911	New York	Republican	1861–1932
George P. Codd	1921–1923	Michigan	Republican	1869–1927
James H. Codding	1895–1899	Pennsylvania	Republican	1849–1919
Tony Coelho	1979–1989	California	Democratic	1942–present
Harry B. Coffee	1935–1943	Nebraska	Democratic	1890–1972
John E. Coffee	1833–1836	Georgia	Democratic	1782–1836
John M. Coffee	1937–1947	Washington	Democratic	1897–1983
Henry A. Coffeen	1893–1895	Wyoming	Democratic	1841–1912
Robert L. Coffey	1949	Pennsylvania	Democratic	1918–1949
Charles D. Coffin	1837–1839	Ohio	Whig	1805–1880
Charles E. Coffin	1894–1897	Maryland	Republican	1841–1912
Frank M. Coffin	1957–1961	Maine	Democratic	1919–2009
Howard A. Coffin	1947–1949	Michigan	Republican	1877–1956
Peleg Coffin Jr.	1793–1795	Massachusetts	Pro-Administration	1756–1805
Thomas C. Coffin	1933–1934	Idaho	Democratic	1887–1934
Mike Coffman	2009–2019	Colorado	Republican	1955–present
Alexander H. Coffroth	1863–1865; 1866; 1879–1881	Pennsylvania	Democratic	1828–1906
John M. Coghlan	1871–1873	California	Republican	1835–1879
William Cogswell	1887–1895	Massachusetts	Republican	1838–1895
Jeffery Cohelan	1959–1971	California	Democratic	1914–1999
William Cohen	1973–1979	Maine	Republican	1940–present
William W. Cohen	1927–1929	New York	Democratic	1874–1940
Joshua Coit	1793–1795	Connecticut	Pro-Administration	1758–1798
Joshua Coit	1795–1798	Connecticut	Federalist	1758–1798
Richard Coke Jr.	1829–1833	Virginia	Democratic	1790–1851
William F. Colcock	1849–1853	South Carolina	Democratic	1804–1889
Cadwallader D. Colden	1821–1823	New York	Federalist	1769–1834
Charles J. Colden	1933–1938	California	Democratic	1870–1938
Albert M. Cole	1945–1953	Kansas	Republican	1901–1994
Cornelius Cole	1863–1865	California	Union Republican	1822–1924
Cyrenus Cole	1921–1933	Iowa	Republican	1863–1939
George Edward Cole	1863–1865	Washington	Democratic	1826–1906
Nathan Cole	1877–1879	Missouri	Republican	1825–1904
Orsamus Cole	1849–1851	Wisconsin	Whig	1819–1903
R. Clint Cole	1919–1925	Ohio	Republican	1870–1957
Ralph D. Cole	1905–1911	Ohio	Republican	1873–1932
W. Sterling Cole	1935–1957	New York	Republican	1904–1987
William Clay Cole	1943–1949; 1953–1955	Missouri	Republican	1897–1965
William Hinson Cole	1885–1886	Maryland	Democratic	1837–1886
William Purington Cole Jr.	1927–1929; 1931–1942	Maryland	Democratic	1889–1957
Tom Coleman	1976–1993	Missouri	Republican	1943–present
Hamilton D. Coleman	1889–1891	Louisiana	Republican	1845–1926
Nicholas D. Coleman	1829–1831	Kentucky	Democratic	1800–1874
Ron Coleman	1983–1997	Texas	Democratic	1941–present
William H. Coleman	1915–1917	Pennsylvania	Republican	1871–1943
Walpole G. Colerick	1879–1883	Indiana	Democratic	1845–1911
Isaac Coles	1789–1791; 1793–1795	Virginia	Anti-Administration	1747–1813
Isaac Coles	1795–1797	Virginia	Democratic-Republican	1747–1813
Walter Coles	1835–1845	Virginia	Democratic	1790–1857
Schuyler Colfax	1855–1869	Indiana	Republican	1823–1885
Jacob Collamer	1843–1849	Vermont	Whig	1791–1865
Harold R. Collier	1957–1975	Illinois	Republican	1915–2006
James Collier	1909–1933	Mississippi	Democratic	1872–1933
John A. Collier	1831–1833	New York	Anti-Masonic	1787–1873
John F. Collin	1845–1847	New York	Democratic	1802–1889
Barbara-Rose Collins	1991–1997	Michigan	Democratic	1939–2021
Cardiss Collins	1973–1997	Illinois	Democratic	1931–2013
Chris Collins	2013–2019	New York	Republican	1950–present
Doug Collins	2013–2021	Georgia	Republican	1966–present
Ela Collins	1823–1825	New York	Democratic-Republican	1786–1848
Francis D. Collins	1875–1879	Pennsylvania	Democratic	1841–1891
George W. Collins	1970–1972	Illinois	Democratic	1925–1972
James M. Collins	1968–1983	Texas	Republican	1916–1989
Mac Collins	1993–2005	Georgia	Republican	1944–2018
Patrick Collins	1883–1889	Massachusetts	Democratic	1844–1905
Ross A. Collins	1921–1935; 1937–1943	Mississippi	Democratic	1880–1968
Sam L. Collins	1933–1937	California	Republican	1895–1965
William Collins	1847–1849	New York	Democratic	1818–1878
William M. Colmer	1933–1973	Mississippi	Democratic	1890–1980
Antonio Colorado	1992–1993	Puerto Rico	Popular Democratic	1939–present
Alfred H. Colquitt	1853–1855	Georgia	Democratic	1824–1894
Walter T. Colquitt	1839–1840	Georgia	Whig	1799–1855
Walter T. Colquitt	1842–1843	Georgia	Democratic	1799–1855
David G. Colson	1895–1899	Kentucky	Republican	1861–1904
Edward Colston	1817–1819	Virginia	Federalist	1786–1852
Don B. Colton	1921–1933	Utah	Republican	1876–1952
Larry Combest	1985–2003	Texas	Republican	1945–present
George H. Combs Jr.	1927–1929	Missouri	Democratic	1899–1977
Jesse M. Combs	1945–1953	Texas	Democratic	1889–1953
Abram Comingo	1871–1875	Missouri	Democratic	1820–1889
Linus B. Comins	1855–1857	Massachusetts	American	1817–1892
Linus B. Comins	1857–1859	Massachusetts	Republican	1817–1892
Barnes Compton	1885–1890; 1891–1894	Maryland	Democratic	1830–1898
Ranulf Compton	1943–1945	Connecticut	Republican	1878–1974
Barbara Comstock	2015–2019	Virginia	Republican	1959–present
Charles C. Comstock	1885–1887	Michigan	Democratic	1818–1900
Daniel Webster Comstock	1917	Indiana	Republican	1840–1917
Oliver C. Comstock	1813–1819	New York	Democratic-Republican	1780–1860
Solomon Comstock	1889–1891	Minnesota	Republican	1842–1933
Barber Conable	1965–1985	New York	Republican	1922–2003
John Conard	1813–1815	Pennsylvania	Democratic-Republican	1773–1857
Mike Conaway	2005–2021	Texas	Republican	1948–present
Lewis Condict	1811–1817; 1821–1825	New Jersey	Democratic-Republican	1772–1862
Lewis Condict	1825–1833	New Jersey	National Republican	1772–1862
Gary Condit	1989–2003	California	Democratic	1948–present
John Condit	1799–1803; 1819	New Jersey	Democratic-Republican	1755–1834
Silas Condit	1831–1833	New Jersey	National Republican	1778–1861
Francis Condon	1930–1935	Rhode Island	Democratic	1891–1965
Robert Condon	1953–1955	California	Democratic	1912–1976
Edwin H. Conger	1885–1890	Iowa	Republican	1843–1907
Harmon S. Conger	1847–1851	New York	Whig	1816–1882
James L. Conger	1851–1853	Michigan	Whig	1805–1876
Omar D. Conger	1869–1881	Michigan	Republican	1818–1898
Alfred Conkling	1821–1823	New York	Democratic-Republican	1789–1874
Frederick A. Conkling	1861–1863	New York	Republican	1816–1891
Roscoe Conkling	1859–1863; 1865–1867	New York	Republican	1829–1888
John Conlan	1973–1977	Arizona	Republican	1930–2021
Charles G. Conn	1893–1895	Indiana	Democratic	1844–1931
Tom Connally	1917–1929	Texas	Democratic	1877–1963
Charles R. Connell	1921–1922	Pennsylvania	Republican	1864–1922
Richard E. Connell	1911–1912	New York	Democratic	1857–1912
William Connell	1897–1903; 1904–1905	Pennsylvania	Republican	1827–1909
William James Connell	1889–1891	Nebraska	Republican	1846–1924
John R. Connelly	1913–1919	Kansas	Democratic	1870–1940
James P. Conner	1900–1909	Iowa	Republican	1851–1924
John C. Conner	1870–1873	Texas	Democratic	1842–1873
Samuel S. Conner	1815–1817	Massachusetts	Democratic-Republican	c. 1783 – 1820
Lawrence J. Connery	1937–1941	Massachusetts	Democratic	1895–1941
William P. Connery Jr.	1923–1937	Massachusetts	Democratic	1888–1937
Daniel W. Connolly	1883–1885	Pennsylvania	Democratic	1847–1894
Gerry Connolly	2009–2025	Virginia	Democratic	1950–2025
James A. Connolly	1895–1899	Illinois	Republican	1843–1914
James J. Connolly	1921–1935	Pennsylvania	Republican	1881–1952
Maurice Connolly	1913–1915	Iowa	Democratic	1877–1921
Henry William Connor	1821–1825	North Carolina	Democratic-Republican	1793–1866
Henry William Connor	1825–1841	North Carolina	Democratic	1793–1866
William Sheldrick Conover	1972–1973	Pennsylvania	Republican	1928–2022
Charles Magill Conrad	1849–1850	Louisiana	Whig	1804–1878
Frederick Conrad	1803–1807	Pennsylvania	Democratic-Republican	1759–1827
Joseph A. Conry	1901–1903	Massachusetts	Democratic	1868–1943
Michael F. Conry	1909–1917	New York	Democratic	1870–1917
Albert Constable	1845–1847	Maryland	Democratic	1805–1855
Silvio O. Conte	1959–1991	Massachusetts	Republican	1921–1991
Benjamin Contee	1789–1791	Maryland	Anti-Administration	1755–1815
George L. Converse	1879–1885	Ohio	Democratic	1827–1897
Connie Conway	2022–2023	California	Republican	1950–present
Henry W. Conway	1823–1827	Arkansas	None	1793–1827
Martin F. Conway	1861–1863	Kansas	Republican	1827–1882
John Conyers	1965–2017	Michigan	Democratic	1929–2019
Burton C. Cook	1865–1871	Illinois	Republican	1819–1894
Daniel Pope Cook	1819–1825	Illinois	Democratic-Republican	1794–1827
Daniel Pope Cook	1825–1827	Illinois	National Republican	1794–1827
George W. Cook	1907–1909	Colorado	Republican	1851–1916
Joel Cook	1907–1910	Pennsylvania	Republican	1842–1910
John C. Cook	1883; 1883–1885	Iowa	Democratic	1846–1920
John Parsons Cook	1853–1855	Iowa	Whig	1817–1872
Merrill Cook	1997–2001	Utah	Republican	1946–2026
Orchard Cook	1805–1811	Massachusetts	Democratic-Republican	1763–1819
Paul Cook	2013–2020	California	Republican	1943–present
Philip Cook	1873–1883	Georgia	Democratic	1817–1894
Robert E. Cook	1959–1963	Ohio	Democratic	1920–1988
Samuel A. Cook	1895–1897	Wisconsin	Republican	1849–1918
Samuel E. Cook	1923–1925	Indiana	Democratic	1860–1946
Zadock Cook	1816–1819	Georgia	Democratic-Republican	1769–1863
Bates Cooke	1831–1833	New York	Anti-Masonic	1787–1841
Edmund F. Cooke	1929–1933	New York	Republican	1885–1967
Edward D. Cooke	1895–1897	Illinois	Republican	1849–1897
Eleutheros Cooke	1831–1833	Ohio	National Republican	1787–1864
Thomas B. Cooke	1811–1813	New York	Democratic-Republican	1778–1853
John Cooksey	1997–2003	Louisiana	Republican	1941–2022
Harold D. Cooley	1934–1966	North Carolina	Democratic	1897–1974
Wes Cooley	1995–1997	Oregon	Republican	1932–2015
Frederick S. Coolidge	1891–1893	Massachusetts	Democratic	1841–1906
Frank Coombs	1901–1903	California	Republican	1853–1934
William J. Coombs	1891–1895	New York	Democratic	1833–1922
Sam Coon	1953–1957	Oregon	Republican	1903–1980
James Cooney	1897–1903	Missouri	Democratic	1848–1904
Allen F. Cooper	1903–1911	Pennsylvania	Republican	1862–1917
Charles Merian Cooper	1893–1897	Florida	Democratic	1856–1923
Edmund Cooper	1866–1867	Tennessee	Unionist	1821–1911
Edward Cooper	1915–1919	West Virginia	Republican	1873–1928
George B. Cooper	1859–1860	Michigan	Democratic	1808–1866
George W. Cooper	1889–1895	Indiana	Democratic	1851–1899
Henry Allen Cooper	1893–1919; 1921–1931	Wisconsin	Republican	1850–1931
James Cooper	1839–1843	Pennsylvania	Whig	1810–1863
Jere Cooper	1929–1957	Tennessee	Democratic	1893–1957
Jim Cooper	1983–1995; 2003–2023	Tennessee	Democratic	1954–present
John G. Cooper	1915–1937	Ohio	Republican	1872–1955
Mark A. Cooper	1839–1841	Georgia	Whig	1800–1885
Mark A. Cooper	1842–1843	Georgia	Democratic	1800–1885
Richard M. Cooper	1829–1833	New Jersey	National Republican	1768–1843
Samuel B. Cooper	1893–1905; 1907–1909	Texas	Democratic	1850–1918
Thomas Cooper	1813–1817	Delaware	Federalist	1764–1829
Thomas Buchecker Cooper	1861–1862	Pennsylvania	Democratic	1823–1862
William Cooper	1795–1797; 1799–1801	New York	Federalist	1754–1809
William C. Cooper	1885–1891	Ohio	Republican	1832–1902
William R. Cooper	1839–1841	New Jersey	Democratic	1793–1856
Oren S. Copeland	1941–1943	Nebraska	Republican	1887–1958
Ira C. Copley	1911–1915	Illinois	Republican	1864–1947
Ira C. Copley	1915–1917	Illinois	Progressive	1864–1947
Ira C. Copley	1917–1923	Illinois	Republican	1864–1947
Sam Coppersmith	1993–1995	Arizona	Democratic	1955–present
Robert J. Corbett	1939–1941; 1945–1971	Pennsylvania	Republican	1905–1971
Tom Corcoran	1977–1984	Illinois	Republican	1939–present
Jorge Luis Córdova	1969–1973	Puerto Rico	New Progressive	1907–1994
Félix Córdova Dávila	1917–1932	Puerto Rico	Unionist	1878–1938
Stephen A. Corker	1870–1871	Georgia	Democratic	1830–1879
William Wellington Corlett	1877–1879	Wyoming	Democratic	1842–1890
Manuel S. Corley	1868–1869	South Carolina	Republican	1823–1902
John Blaisdell Corliss	1895–1903	Michigan	Republican	1851–1929
James C. Corman	1961–1981	California	Democratic	1920–2000
Robert John Cornell	1975–1979	Wisconsin	Democratic	1919–2009
Thomas Cornell	1867–1869; 1881–1883	New York	Republican	1814–1890
Erastus Corning	1857–1859; 1861–1863	New York	Democratic	1794–1872
Parker Corning	1923–1937	New York	Democratic	1874–1943
Johnston Cornish	1893–1895	New Jersey	Democratic	1858–1920
David L. Cornwell	1977–1979	Indiana	Democratic	1945–2012
Baltasar Corrada del Río	1977–1985	Puerto Rico	New Progressive	1935–2018
Franklin Corwin	1873–1875	Illinois	Republican	1818–1879
Moses Bledso Corwin	1849–1851; 1853–1855	Ohio	Whig	1790–1872
Thomas Corwin	1831–1833	Ohio	National Republican	1794–1865
Thomas Corwin	1833–1840	Ohio	Whig	1794–1865
Thomas Corwin	1859–1861	Ohio	Republican	1794–1865
Jeremiah Cosden	1821–1822	Maryland	Democratic-Republican	1768–1824
John Cosgrove	1883–1885	Missouri	Democratic	1839–1925
Jerry Costello	1988–2013	Illinois	Democratic	1949–present
John M. Costello	1935–1945	California	Democratic	1903–1976
Peter E. Costello	1915–1921	Pennsylvania	Republican	1854–1935
Ryan Costello	2015–2019	Pennsylvania	Republican	1976–present
James S. Cothran	1887–1891	South Carolina	Democratic	1830–1897
William R. Cotter	1971–1981	Connecticut	Democratic	1926–1981
Joseph S. Cottman	1851–1853	Maryland	Independent Whig	1803–1863
Aylett R. Cotton	1871–1875	Iowa	Republican	1826–1912
Norris Cotton	1947–1954	New Hampshire	Republican	1900–1989
Tom Cotton	2013–2015	Arkansas	Republican	1977–present
James L. F. Cottrell	1846–1847	Alabama	Democratic	1808–1885
Frederic Coudert Jr.	1947–1959	New York	Republican	1898–1972
Harry M. Coudrey	1906–1911	Missouri	Republican	1867–1930
Clarence D. Coughlin	1921–1923	Pennsylvania	Republican	1883–1946
Lawrence Coughlin	1969–1993	Pennsylvania	Republican	1929–2001
Richard Coulter	1827–1835	Pennsylvania	Democratic	1788–1852
Jim Courter	1979–1991	New Jersey	Republican	1941–present
W. Wirt Courtney	1939–1949	Tennessee	Democratic	1889–1961
Robert G. Cousins	1893–1909	Iowa	Republican	1859–1933
James W. Covert	1877–1881; 1889–1895	New York	Democratic	1842–1910
George W. Covington	1881–1885	Maryland	Democratic	1838–1911
J. Harry Covington	1909–1914	Maryland	Democratic	1870–1942
Leonard Covington	1805–1807	Maryland	Democratic-Republican	1768–1813
John Covode	1855–1857	Pennsylvania	Oppositionist	1808–1871
John Covode	1857–1863; 1867–1869; 1870–1871	Pennsylvania	Republican	1808–1871
Jacob Pitzer Cowan	1875–1877	Ohio	Democratic	1823–1895
Benjamin S. Cowen	1841–1843	Ohio	Whig	1793–1869
John K. Cowen	1895–1897	Maryland	Democratic	1844–1904
William Cowger	1967–1971	Kentucky	Republican	1922–1971
Calvin Cowgill	1879–1881	Indiana	Republican	1819–1903
William S. Cowherd	1897–1905	Missouri	Democratic	1860–1915
Charles H. Cowles	1909–1911	North Carolina	Republican	1875–1957
George W. Cowles	1869–1871	New York	Republican	1823–1901
Henry B. Cowles	1829–1831	New York	National Republican	1798–1873
William H. H. Cowles	1885–1893	North Carolina	Democratic	1840–1901
Christopher Cox	1989–2005	California	Republican	1952–present
E. Eugene Cox	1925–1952	Georgia	Democratic	1880–1952
Isaac N. Cox	1891–1893	New York	Democratic	1846–1916
Jacob D. Cox	1877–1879	Ohio	Republican	1828–1900
James Cox	1809–1810	New Jersey	Democratic-Republican	1753–1810
James M. Cox	1909–1913	Ohio	Democratic	1870–1957
John W. Cox Jr.	1991–1993	Illinois	Democratic	1947–present
Leander Cox	1853–1855	Kentucky	Whig	1812–1865
Leander Cox	1855–1857	Kentucky	American	1812–1865
Nicholas N. Cox	1891–1901	Tennessee	Democratic	1837–1912
Samuel S. Cox	1857–1865	Ohio	Democratic	1824–1889
Samuel S. Cox	1869–1873; 1873–1885; 1886–1889	New York	Democratic	1824–1889
TJ Cox	2019–2021	California	Democratic	1963–present
William E. Cox	1907–1919	Indiana	Democratic	1861–1942
William Ruffin Cox	1881–1887	North Carolina	Democratic	1831/2–1919
William Coxe Jr.	1813–1815	New Jersey	Federalist	1762–1831
William R. Coyle	1925–1927; 1929–1933	Pennsylvania	Republican	1878–1962
James K. Coyne III	1981–1983	Pennsylvania	Republican	1946–present
William J. Coyne	1981–2003	Pennsylvania	Democratic	1936–2013
George W. Crabb	1838–1841	Alabama	Whig	1804–1846
Jeremiah Crabb	1795–1796	Maryland	Federalist	1760–1800
John D. Craddock	1929–1931	Kentucky	Republican	1881–1942
John Cradlebaugh	1861–1863	Nevada	Independent	1819–1872
Samuel C. Crafts	1817–1825	Vermont	Democratic-Republican	1768–1853
Aaron H. Cragin	1855–1857	New Hampshire	American	1821–1898
Aaron H. Cragin	1857–1859	New Hampshire	Republican	1821–1898
Thomas S. Crago	1911–1913; 1915–1921; 1921–1923	Pennsylvania	Republican	1866–1925
Alexander Kerr Craig	1892	Pennsylvania	Democratic	1828–1892
George Henry Craig	1885	Alabama	Republican	1845–1923
Hector Craig	1823–1825	New York	Democratic-Republican	1775–1842
Hector Craig	1829–1830	New York	Democratic	1775–1842
James Craig	1857–1861	Missouri	Democratic	1818–1888
Larry Craig	1981–1991	Idaho	Republican	1945–present
Robert Craig	1829–1833; 1835–1841	Virginia	Democratic	1792–1852
Samuel Alfred Craig	1889–1891	Pennsylvania	Republican	1839–1920
William Benjamin Craig	1907–1911	Alabama	Democratic	1877–1925
F. Burton Craige	1853–1861	North Carolina	Democratic	1811–1875
William Craik	1796–1801	Maryland	Federalist	1761–1814
Joe Crail	1927–1933	California	Republican	1877–1938
William H. Crain	1885–1896	Texas	Democratic	1848–1896
Nathaniel N. Craley Jr.	1965–1967	Pennsylvania	Democratic	1927–2006
John Cramer	1833–1837	New York	Democratic	1779–1870
Kevin Cramer	2013–2019	North Dakota	Republican	1961–present
Bud Cramer	1991–2009	Alabama	Democratic	1947–present
William C. Cramer	1955–1971	Florida	Republican	1922–2003
Louis C. Cramton	1913–1931	Michigan	Republican	1875–1966
Dan Crane	1979–1985	Illinois	Republican	1936–2019
Joseph H. Crane	1829–1837	Ohio	National Republican	1782–1851
Phil Crane	1969–2005	Illinois	Republican	1930–2014
John W. Cranford	1897–1899	Texas	Democratic	1862–1899
Henry Y. Cranston	1843–1845	Rhode Island	Law and Order	1789–1864
Henry Y. Cranston	1845–1847	Rhode Island	Whig	1789–1864
Robert B. Cranston	1837–1843; 1847–1849	Rhode Island	Whig	1791–1873
Mike Crapo	1993–1999	Idaho	Republican	1951–present
William W. Crapo	1875–1883	Massachusetts	Republican	1830–1926
Isaac E. Crary	1837–1841	Michigan	Democratic	1804–1854
Chip Cravaack	2011–2013	Minnesota	Republican	1959–present
James A. Cravens	1861–1865	Indiana	Democratic	1818–1893
James H. Cravens	1841–1843	Indiana	Whig	1802–1876
Jordan E. Cravens	1877–1883	Arkansas	Democratic	1830–1914
William B. Cravens	1907–1913; 1933–1939	Arkansas	Democratic	1872–1939
William Fadjo Cravens	1939–1949	Arkansas	Democratic	1899–1974
Fred L. Crawford	1935–1953	Michigan	Republican	1888–1957
George W. Crawford	1843	Georgia	Whig	1798–1872
Joel Crawford	1817–1821	Georgia	Democratic-Republican	1783–1858
Martin J. Crawford	1855–1861	Georgia	Democratic	1820–1883
Thomas Hartley Crawford	1829–1833	Pennsylvania	Democratic	1786–1863
William Crawford	1809–1817	Pennsylvania	Democratic-Republican	1760–1823
William T. Crawford	1891–1895; 1899–1900; 1907–1909	North Carolina	Democratic	1856–1913
Charles E. Creager	1909–1911	Oklahoma	Republican	1873–1964
Edward W. Creal	1935–1943	Kentucky	Democratic	1883–1943
Thomas J. Creamer	1873–1875; 1901–1903	New York	Democratic	1843–1914
John M. Crebs	1869–1873	Illinois	Democratic	1830–1890
John V. Creely	1871–1873	Pennsylvania	Independent Republican	1839–1900
William Creighton Jr.	1813–1817	Ohio	Democratic-Republican	1778–1851
William Creighton Jr.	1827–1833	Ohio	National Republican	1778–1851
Frank Cremeans	1995–1997	Ohio	Republican	1943–2003
Ander Crenshaw	2001–2017	Florida	Republican	1944–present
John Creswell	1863–1865	Maryland	Republican	1828–1891
Albert W. Cretella	1953–1959	Connecticut	Republican	1897–1979
John W. Crisfield	1847–1849	Maryland	Whig	1806–1897
John W. Crisfield	1861–1863	Maryland	Unionist	1806–1897
Charles F. Crisp	1883–1896	Georgia	Democratic	1845–1896
Charles R. Crisp	1896–1897; 1913–1932	Georgia	Democratic	1870–1937
Charlie Crist	2017–2022	Florida	Democratic	1956–present
Henry Crist	1809–1811	Kentucky	Democratic-Republican	1764–1844
John Critcher	1871–1873	Virginia	Democratic	1820–1901
John J. Crittenden	1861–1863	Kentucky	Unionist	1787–1863
Thomas Theodore Crittenden	1873–1875; 1877–1879	Missouri	Democratic	1832–1909
Mark Critz	2010–2013	Pennsylvania	Democratic	1962–present
Henry Crocheron	1815–1817	New York	Democratic-Republican	1772–1819
Jacob Crocheron	1829–1831	New York	Democratic	1774–1849
Alvah Crocker	1872–1874	Massachusetts	Republican	1801–1874
Samuel L. Crocker	1853–1855	Massachusetts	Whig	1804–1883
Davy Crockett	1827–1829	Tennessee	Democratic	1786–1836
Davy Crockett	1829–1831; 1833–1835	Tennessee	National Republican	1786–1836
George Crockett Jr.	1980–1991	Michigan	Democratic	1909–1997
John Wesley Crockett	1837–1841	Tennessee	Whig	1807–1852
George W. Croft	1903–1904	South Carolina	Democratic	1846–1904
Theodore G. Croft	1904–1905	South Carolina	Democratic	1874–1920
William M. Croll	1923–1925	Pennsylvania	Democratic	1866–1929
George W. Cromer	1899–1907	Indiana	Republican	1856–1936
Paul W. Cronin	1973–1975	Massachusetts	Republican	1938–1997
Thurman C. Crook	1949–1951	Indiana	Democratic	1891–1981
Philip S. Crooke	1873–1875	New York	Republican	1810–1881
Charles N. Crosby	1933–1939	Pennsylvania	Democratic	1876–1951
John Crawford Crosby	1891–1893	Massachusetts	Democratic	1859–1943
Edward Cross	1839–1845	Arkansas	Democratic	1798–1887
Oliver H. Cross	1929–1937	Texas	Democratic	1868–1960
Robert Crosser	1913–1919; 1923–1955	Ohio	Democratic	1874–1957
Edward Crossland	1871–1875	Kentucky	Democratic	1827–1881
Edward Crouch	1813–1815	Pennsylvania	Democratic-Republican	1764–1827
Lorenzo Crounse	1873–1877	Nebraska	Republican	1834–1909
George W. Crouse	1887–1889	Ohio	Republican	1832–1912
Charles A. Crow	1909–1911	Missouri	Republican	1873–1938
William J. Crow	1947–1949	Pennsylvania	Republican	1902–1974
Eugene B. Crowe	1931–1941	Indiana	Democratic	1878–1970
John Crowell	1818–1819; 1819–1821	Alabama	Democratic-Republican	1780–1846
John Crowell	1847–1851	Ohio	Whig	1801–1883
Joe Crowley	1999–2019	New York	Democratic	1962–present
Joseph B. Crowley	1899–1905	Illinois	Democratic	1858–1931
Miles Crowley	1895–1897	Texas	Democratic	1859–1921
Richard Crowley	1879–1883	New York	Republican	1836–1908
Benjamin W. Crowninshield	1823–1825	Massachusetts	Democratic-Republican	1772–1851
Benjamin W. Crowninshield	1825–1831	Massachusetts	National Republican	1772–1851
Jacob Crowninshield	1803–1808	Massachusetts	Democratic-Republican	1770–1808
Frank Crowther	1919–1943	New York	Republican	1870–1955
George C. Crowther	1895–1897	Missouri	Republican	1849–1914
Thomas Croxton	1885–1887	Virginia	Democratic	1822–1903
John Hervey Crozier	1845–1849	Tennessee	Whig	1812–1889
Josiah Crudup	1821–1823	North Carolina	Democratic-Republican	1791–1872
Daniel Cruger	1817–1819	New York	Democratic-Republican	1780–1843
E. H. Crump	1931–1935	Tennessee	Democratic	1874–1954
George W. Crump	1826–1827	Virginia	Democratic	1786–1848
Rousseau O. Crump	1895–1901	Michigan	Republican	1843–1901
Edgar D. Crumpacker	1897–1913	Indiana	Republican	1851–1920
Maurice E. Crumpacker	1925–1927	Oregon	Republican	1886–1927
Shepard J. Crumpacker Jr.	1951–1957	Indiana	Republican	1917–1986
William Crutchfield	1873–1875	Tennessee	Republican	1824–1890
Barbara Cubin	1995–2009	Wyoming	Republican	1946–present
David B. Culberson	1875–1897	Texas	Democratic	1830–1900
John Culberson	2001–2019	Texas	Republican	1956–present
William Constantine Culbertson	1889–1891	Pennsylvania	Republican	1825–1906
William Wirt Culbertson	1883–1885	Kentucky	Republican	1835–1911
Thomas Culbreth	1817–1821	Maryland	Democratic-Republican	1786–1843
Francis D. Culkin	1928–1943	New York	Republican	1874–1943
Elisha D. Cullen	1855–1857	Delaware	American	1799–1862
Thomas H. Cullen	1919–1944	New York	Democratic	1868–1944
William Cullen	1881–1885	Illinois	Republican	1826–1914
Alvan Cullom	1843–1847	Tennessee	Democratic	1797–1877
Shelby M. Cullom	1865–1871	Illinois	Republican	1829–1914
William Cullom	1851–1855	Tennessee	Whig	1810–1896
William A. Cullop	1909–1917	Indiana	Democratic	1853–1927
John Culpepper	1807–1808; 1808–1809; 1813–1817; 1819–1821; 1823–1825	North Carolina	Federalist	1761–1841
John Culpepper	1827–1829	North Carolina	National Republican	1761–1841
Charles Vernon Culver	1865–1867	Pennsylvania	Republican	1830–1909
Erastus D. Culver	1845–1847	New York	Whig	1803–1889
John Culver	1965–1975	Iowa	Democratic	1932–2018
William Cumback	1855–1857	Indiana	Oppositionist	1829–1905
Thomas W. Cumming	1853–1855	New York	Democratic	????–1855
Amos J. Cummings	1887–1889; 1889–1894; 1895–1902	New York	Democratic	1838–1902
Elijah Cummings	1996–2019	Maryland	Democratic	1951–2019
Fred N. Cummings	1933–1941	Colorado	Democratic	1864–1952
Henry J. B. Cummings	1877–1879	Iowa	Republican	1831–1909
Herbert W. Cummings	1923–1925	Pennsylvania	Democratic	1873–1956
John D. Cummins	1845–1849	Ohio	Democratic	1791–1849
Francis A. Cunningham	1845–1847	Ohio	Democratic	1804–1864
Glenn Cunningham	1957–1971	Nebraska	Republican	1912–2003
Joe Cunningham	2019–2021	South Carolina	Democratic	1982–present
John E. Cunningham	1977–1979	Washington	Republican	1931–2025
Paul Cunningham	1941–1959	Iowa	Republican	1890–1961
Duke Cunningham	1991–2005	California	Republican	1941–2025
Carlos Curbelo	2015–2019	Florida	Republican	1980–present
Edward W. Curley	1935–1940	New York	Democratic	1873–1940
James Michael Curley	1911–1914; 1943–1947	Massachusetts	Democratic	1874–1958
William P. Curlin Jr.	1971–1973	Kentucky	Democratic	1933–2022
Gilbert A. Currie	1917–1921	Michigan	Republican	1882–1960
Frank D. Currier	1901–1913	New Hampshire	Republican	1853–1921
Charles F. Curry	1913–1930	California	Republican	1858–1930
Charles F. Curry Jr.	1931–1933	California	Republican	1893–1972
George Curry	1912–1913	New Mexico	Republican	1861–1947
Jabez L. M. Curry	1857–1861	Alabama	Democratic	1825–1903
David Curson	2012–2013	Michigan	Democratic	1948–2024
Andrew Gregg Curtin	1881–1887	Pennsylvania	Democratic	1817–1894
Willard S. Curtin	1957–1967	Pennsylvania	Republican	1905–1996
Carl Curtis	1939–1954	Nebraska	Republican	1905–2000
Carlton B. Curtis	1851–1855	Pennsylvania	Democratic	1811–1883
Carlton B. Curtis	1873–1875	Pennsylvania	Republican	1811–1883
Charles Curtis	1893–1907	Kansas	Republican	1860–1936
Edward Curtis	1837–1841	New York	Whig	1801–1856
George M. Curtis	1895–1899	Iowa	Republican	1844–1921
John Curtis	2017–2025	Utah	Republican	1960–present
Laurence Curtis	1953–1963	Massachusetts	Republican	1893–1989
Newton Martin Curtis	1891–1897	New York	Republican	1835–1910
Samuel Ryan Curtis	1857–1861	Iowa	Republican	1805–1866
Thomas B. Curtis	1951–1969	Missouri	Republican	1911–1993
Thomas Cusack	1899–1901	Illinois	Democratic	1858–1926
Caleb Cushing	1835–1837	Massachusetts	National Republican	1800–1879
Caleb Cushing	1837–1843	Massachusetts	Whig	1800–1879
Francis W. Cushman	1899–1909	Washington	Republican	1867–1909
John P. Cushman	1817–1819	New York	Federalist	1784–1848
Joshua Cushman	1819–1821	Massachusetts	Democratic-Republican	1761–1834
Joshua Cushman	1821–1825	Maine	Democratic-Republican	1761–1834
Samuel Cushman	1835–1839	New Hampshire	Democratic	1783–1851
Byron M. Cutcheon	1883–1891	Michigan	Republican	1836–1908
Alfred Cuthbert	1813–1816; 1821–1825	Georgia	Democratic-Republican	1785–1856
Alfred Cuthbert	1825–1827	Georgia	Democratic	1785–1856
John A. Cuthbert	1819–1821	Georgia	Democratic-Republican	1788–1881
Augustus W. Cutler	1875–1879	New Jersey	Democratic	1827–1897
Manasseh Cutler	1801–1805	Massachusetts	Federalist	1742–1823
William P. Cutler	1861–1863	Ohio	Republican	1812–1889
Francis B. Cutting	1853–1855	New York	Democratic	1804–1870
John T. Cutting	1891–1893	California	Republican	1844–1911
Marsena E. Cutts	1881–1883; 1883	Iowa	Republican	1833–1883
Richard Cutts	1801–1813	Massachusetts	Democratic-Republican	1771–1845
