= Nathaniel Allen =

American politician (1780–1832)

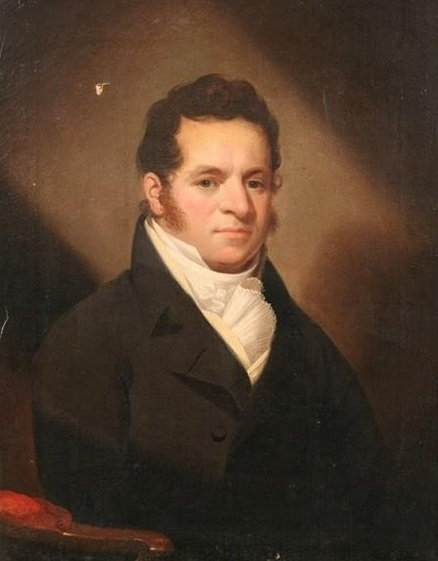

Member of the U.S. House of Representatives from New York's 21st district
- In office March 4, 1819 – March 4, 1821
- Preceded by: Benjamin Ellicott
- Succeeded by: Elijah Spencer

Personal details
- Born: 1780 East Bloomfield, Ontario County, New York, United States
- Died: December 22, 1832 (aged 51–52) Louisville, Kentucky
- Party: Republican
- Spouse: Hilzebeth Akin Allen
- Children: 5
- Profession: Blacksmith, postmaster, politician

Nathaniel Allen (1780 – December 22, 1832) was an American politician, and a United States representative from New York.

== Biography ==
Nathaniel Allen was born the second son of Moses and Chloe Ward Allen in what is now East Bloomfield, Ontario County, New York before the town was established. He attended the common schools. He married Hilzibeth Akin and they had four children, Nathaniel, John, Hilzebeth, and Almira. His wife, Hilzebth died in 1826.

== Career ==
Allen worked as a blacksmith at Canandaigua, New York before he started his own blacksmith shop at Richmond, near Allens Hill in 1796. He was appointed postmaster in Honeoye Falls on July 1, 1811. He was commissioner and paymaster on the Niagara frontier in 1812, and was a militia officer during the War of 1812 as was his brother, Peter Buell Allen. He served as a New York Assemblyman in 1812. He was Sheriff of Ontario County, New York from 1814 to 1819.

Elected as a Democratic-Republican to the 16th United States Congress for one term, Allen served as U.S. Representative for the twenty-first district of New York from March 4, 1819 – March 4, 1821.

Not a candidate for renomination in 1820, Allen was Supervisor of the Town of Richmond. He engaged in the prosecution of claims for money due in connection with the construction of the Louisville & Portland Canal.

== Death ==
Allen died in the Galt House hotel, while conducting business in Louisville, Kentucky, on December 22, 1832 (age about 52 years). He is interred at Allens Hill Cemetery, Richmond, New York.

U.S. House of Representatives
Preceded by Benjamin Ellicott, John C. Spencer	Member of the U.S. House of Representatives from New York's 21st congressional district 1819–1821 with Albert H. Tracy	Succeeded by Elijah Spencer, Albert H. Tracy
