= Henry Mitchell (New York politician) =

American politician

Member of the U.S. House of Representatives from New York's 21st district
- In office March 4, 1833 – March 3, 1835
- Preceded by: John A. Collier
- Succeeded by: William Mason

Personal details
- Born: 1784 Woodbury, Connecticut
- Died: January 12, 1856 (aged 71–72) Norwich, New York
- Party: Jacksonian

Henry Mitchell (1784 – January 12, 1856) was an American medical doctor and politician who served one term as a United States representative from New York.

== Biography ==
He was the son of John Mitchell and Elizabeth Sherman (daughter of Rev. Josiah Sherman and Martha Minott); she was the niece of founding father Roger Sherman and the sister of Roger Minott Sherman.

Mitchell was born in Woodbury, Connecticut in 1784. He pursued classical studies under private tutors and graduated from the medical department of Yale College in 1804. He engaged in the practice of medicine in Norwich, New York.

=== Political career ===
He became a member of the New York State Assembly in 1827; elected as a Jacksonian to the 23rd United States Congress (March 4, 1833 – March 3, 1835).

=== Later career and death ===
After his term in office, he resumed the practice of medicine; died in Norwich, New York on January 12, 1856; interment in Mount Hope Cemetery.

U.S. House of Representatives
Preceded by John A. Collier	Member of the U.S. House of Representatives from New York's 21st congressional district 1833–1835	Succeeded by William Mason
