= Benjamin Ellicott =

American politician

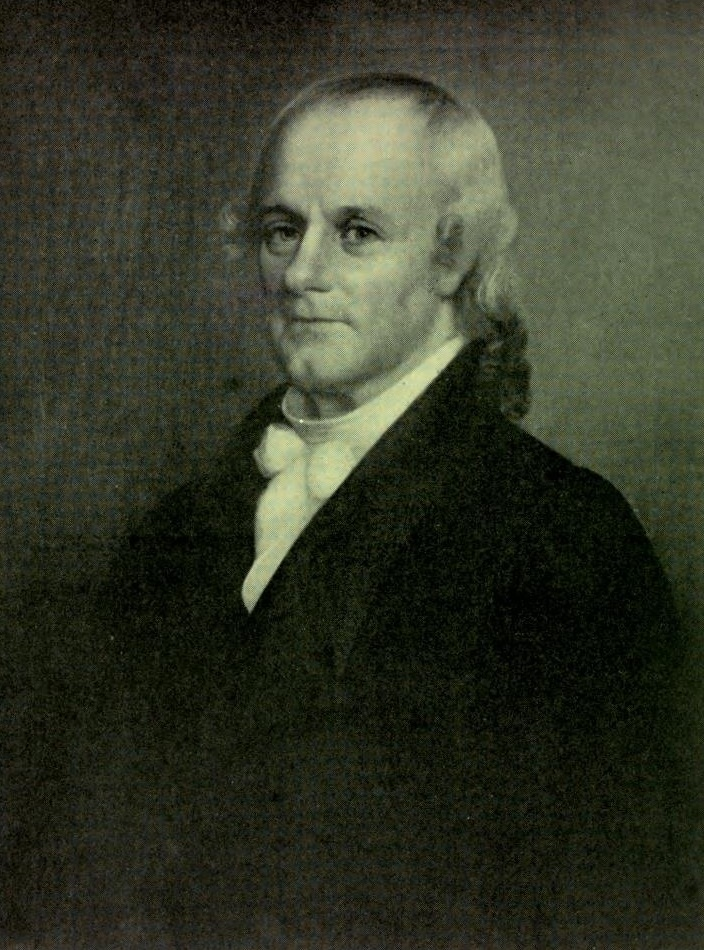
- Ellicott c. 1822

Member of the U.S. House of Representatives from New York's 21st district
- In office March 4, 1817 – March 4, 1819 Serving with John C. Spencer
- Preceded by: Micah Brooks; Archibald S. Clarke
- Succeeded by: Albert H. Tracy; Nathaniel Allen

Personal details
- Born: April 17, 1765 Bucks County, Pennsylvania, USA
- Died: December 10, 1827 (aged 62) Williamsville, New York, USA
- Resting place: Williamsville Cemetery

Benjamin Ellicott (April 17, 1765 – December 10, 1827) was a surveyor, a county judge and a member of the United States House of Representatives from the State of New York.

== Biography ==
Ellicott was born in Bucks County, Pennsylvania, on April 17, 1765.

In 1789, at approximately 24 years old, he accompanied his brothers Andrew and Joseph Ellicott in 1789 to the British Province of Upper Canada in a survey to determine the western boundary of the State of New York.

During 1791, 1792 and 1793, he assisted his brothers in the survey and mapping of the future City of Washington and in the survey of the original boundaries of the 100 square miles (260 km^{2}) District of Columbia, which were established in the Boundary Markers of the Original District of Columbia.

During November–December 1792, he led a survey that helped settle a boundary dispute within the present Ontario County in Western New York, which was resolved with the establishment of the Preemption Line. From 1794–1797, he was employed as a surveyor and draftsman for the Holland Land Company, assisting his brother Joseph in surveys of the company's lands in western Pennsylvania. In 1798, he was in charge of the company's surveys in Western New York. In 1803, he became one of the first judges of the Court of Common Pleas of Genesee County, New York in Batavia.

Ellicott was elected as a Democratic-Republican representative from New York to the Fifteenth Congress (March 4, 1817 – March 3, 1819) for the 21st District. He was an unsuccessful candidate for election in 1820 to the Seventeenth Congress and succeeded by Nathaniel Allen.

== Death ==
He then retired from active life, and in 1826 moved to Williamsville, New York, where he died December 10, 1827. He was interred at the graveyard in Williamsville (Williamsville Cemetery c. 1810). He was re-interred at Batavia Cemetery in Batavia, New York, in 1849.

U.S. House of Representatives
Preceded by Micah Brooks, Archibald S. Clarke	Member of the U.S. House of Representatives from New York's 21st congressional district 1817–1819 with John C. Spencer	Succeeded by Albert H. Tracy, Nathaniel Allen
