= Charles Goodyear (politician) =

American attorney and politician

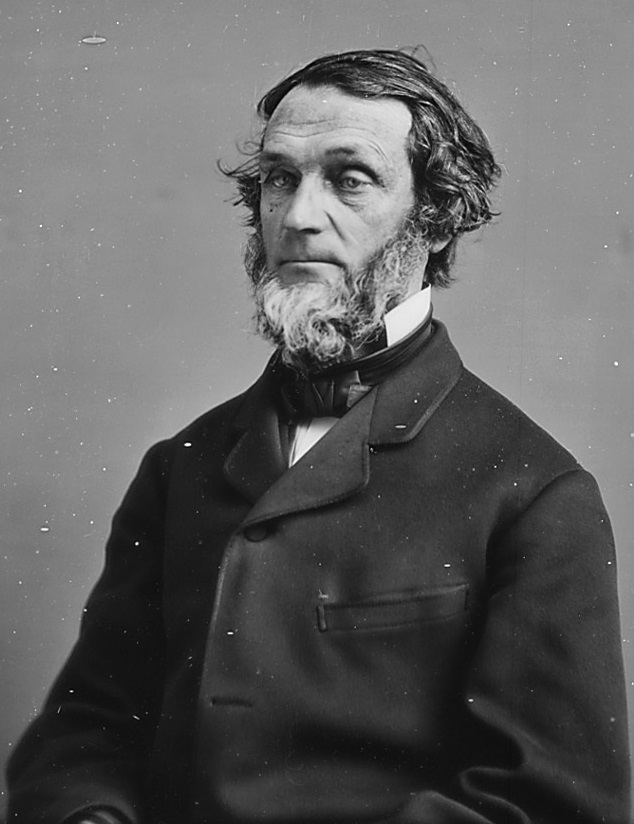
- Mathew Brady photo, circa 1860-1865

Member of the U.S. House of Representatives from New York
- In office March 4, 1865 – March 3, 1867
- Preceded by: John V. L. Pruyn
- Succeeded by: John V. L. Pruyn
- Constituency: 14th district
- In office March 4, 1845 – March 3, 1847
- Preceded by: Jeremiah E. Cary
- Succeeded by: George A. Starkweather
- Constituency: 21st district

Member of the New York State Assembly from Schoharie County
- In office January 1, 1840 – December 31, 1840 Serving with Seymour Boughton
- Preceded by: Harvey Bliss, George F. Fox
- Succeeded by: Nicholas Beekman, Jacob C. Skillman

Personal details
- Born: April 26, 1804 Cobleskill, New York
- Died: April 9, 1876 (aged 71) Charlottesville, Virginia
- Resting place: Maplewood Cemetery, Charlottesville, Virginia
- Party: Democratic
- Spouse: Charlotte Seitz Gebhard (m. 1815-1876, his death)
- Children: 3
- Profession: Attorney

Charles Goodyear (April 26, 1804 – April 9, 1876) was a banker, attorney, and politician from New York. He was most notable for his service as a United States representative from 1845 to 1847 and 1865 to 1867.

== Early life ==
Goodyear was born in Cobleskill, New York on April 26, 1804, the son of Jared Goodyear and Bede (Ives) Goodyear. He attended Hartwick Academy in Otsego County and graduated from Union College in 1824. He studied law with Henry Hamilton, was admitted to the bar in 1826 and commenced practice with Hamilton in Schoharie, New York.

== Start of career ==
A Democrat, he was Schoharie's town supervisor from 1834 to 1837. In 1840 he also served in the New York State Assembly.

Goodyear was appointed first judge of Schoharie County in February 1843 and served until November 1847.

=== Tenure in Congress ===
Goodyear was elected to the United States House of Representatives and served in the 29th Congress (March 4, 1845 – March 3, 1847). During this term, Goodyear was a member of the Committee on Invalid Pensions.

He did not run for reelection and resumed the practice of law in Schoharie. In 1852 he established the Schoharie County Bank, of which he was president.

In 1864 Goodyear was again elected to the U.S. House, and he served in the 39th Congress (March 4, 1865 – March 3, 1867). His committee assignments during this term included the Committee on Revolutionary Pensions and the Committee on Private Land Claims. He was not a candidate for re-nomination in 1866 and resumed the practice of law in Schoharie.

== Later career ==
Goodyear was a delegate to the National Union Convention in 1866 and to the 1868 Democratic National Convention. In 1868 an investment bank in which Goodyear was a partner, Goodyear Brothers & Durand, became insolvent. After liquidating his New York assets and property to help pay the firm's debts, in 1869 Goodyear moved to Charlottesville, Virginia. He practiced law in Virginia and in 1869 received an appointment from Virginia's post-Civil War military government as a justice of the peace for Albemarle County.

== Death and burial ==
Goodyear died in Charlottesville on April 9, 1876, and was interred at Maplewood Cemetery in Charlottesville, Division E, Block 8, Section 7. (Note: The transcript entry for Goodyear's grave gives his date of birth as April 4, 1801.)

== Family ==
In 1835, Goodyear married Charlotte Seitz Gebhard (1815–1887) of Schoharie. They were the parents of three children—Charles A., George G., and Mary.

== Notes ==
U.S. House of Representatives
Preceded by Jeremiah E. Cary	Member of the U.S. House of Representatives from New York's 21st congressional district 1845–1847	Succeeded by George A. Starkweather
Preceded by John V. L. Pruyn	Member of the U.S. House of Representatives from New York's 14th congressional district 1865–1867	Succeeded by John V. L. Pruyn
