= William Mason (New York politician) =

U.S. politician

Member of the U.S. House of Representatives from New York's 21st district
- In office March 4, 1835 – March 3, 1837
- Preceded by: Henry Mitchell
- Succeeded by: John C. Clark

Personal details
- Born: September 10, 1786 Lebanon, Connecticut
- Died: January 13, 1860 (aged 73) Norwich, New York
- Resting place: Mt. Hope Cemetery
- Party: Jacksonian

William Mason (September 10, 1786 – January 13, 1860) was an American medical doctor and politician who served one term as a United States representative from New York from 1835 to 1837.

== Biography ==
Mason was born in Lebanon, Connecticut on September 10, 1786. He studied medicine in Vermont and practiced in Preston, New York. He was a surgeon of the Chenango County Company, New York Volunteers, in 1812. He then became clerk of Chenango County in 1820 – 1821, and a member of the New York State Assembly in 1821 and 1822.

=== Congress ===
He was elected as a Jacksonian to the 24th United States Congress, serving from March 4, 1835 to March 3, 1837.

=== Death ===
Mason died in Norwich, New York on January 13, 1860; interment in Mount Hope Cemetery.

U.S. House of Representatives
Preceded by Henry Mitchell	Member of the U.S. House of Representatives from New York's 21st congressional district 1835–1837	Succeeded by John C. Clark
