= Albert H. Tracy =

American politician (1793–1859)

Member of the U.S. House of Representatives from New York
- In office March 4, 1819 – March 3, 1821 Serving with Nathaniel Allen
- Preceded by: John C. Spencer; Benjamin Ellicott
- Succeeded by: Elijah Spencer
- Constituency: 21st district
- In office December 3, 1821 – March 3, 1825
- Preceded by: New district
- Succeeded by: Daniel G. Garnsey
- Constituency: 22nd district (1821–1823); 30th district (1823–1825)

Member of the New York State Senate from the 8th district
- In office 1830–1837
- Preceded by: Ethan B. Allen
- Succeeded by: William A. Moseley

Personal details
- Born: June 17, 1793 Norwich, Connecticut, United States
- Died: September 19, 1859 (aged 66) Buffalo, New York, United States
- Resting place: Forest Lawn Cemetery, Buffalo, New York, United States
- Party: Democratic-Republican
- Other political affiliations: Anti-Masons; Whigs
- Relatives: Phineas L. Tracy (brother)

Albert Haller Tracy (June 17, 1793 – September 19, 1859) was an American lawyer and politician from New York.

== Life ==
Tracy pursued classical studies, and later studied medicine. In 1811, Tracy removed to New York, where he stopped studying medicine and studied law. He was admitted to the bar in 1815, commenced practice in Buffalo, and became a prominent attorney. In 1825, Tracy married Harriet Foote Norton, daughter of Ebenezer F. Norton, a New York state Assemblyman and later U.S. Representative. The couple had two sons: Albert Haller Tracy (b. 1834) and Francis Walsingham Tracy (b. 1839).

Tracy was elected as a Democratic-Republican to the 16th, 17th and 18th United States Congresses, holding office from March 4, 1819, to March 3, 1825. He was Chairman of the Committee on Expenditures in the Department of the Treasury (17th Congress). In February 1825, Tracy was brought forward as a compromise candidate for U.S. Senator from New York, and was nominated by resolution in the State Senate, but the different majority in the State Assembly refused to concur, and nobody was elected.

In March 1826, Tracy was appointed as Judge of the Eighth Circuit Court, but declined to take office. He was a member of the New York State Senate from 1830 to 1838, and was aligned politically with the Anti-Masons and later the Whigs. Tracy sat in the 53rd, 54th, 55th, 56th, 57th, 58th, 59th and 60th New York State Legislatures.

Tracy was involved in business and cultural organizations within Buffalo throughout his life. He was one of the nine original members of the Buffalo Harbor Company, which was organized in 1819. Tracy was a member of the first board of directors of the branch of the United States Bank, which was established in Buffalo in 1826. He was one of the incorporators in 1846 of the University at Buffalo. Tracy was also the president of the Buffalo Water Works Company from 1855 to 1859.

He died in Buffalo on September 19, 1859, and was buried at Forest Lawn Cemetery.

== Family ==
Albert Tracy was the son of Dr. Philemon Tracy (1757–1837, a physician) and Abigail (Trott) Tracy. Congressman Phineas L. Tracy was his brother.

== See also ==
- United States House of Representatives elections in New York, 1818
- United States Senate election in New York, 1825/1826#Result 1825, no choice

== Sources ==
- United States Congress. "Albert H. Tracy (id: T000343)". Biographical Directory of the United States Congress.
- The New York Civil List compiled by Franklin Benjamin Hough (pages 71, 128ff, 146 and 356; Weed, Parsons and Co., 1858)
- Genealogy of the Family of Lt. Thomas Tracy, of Norwich Connecticut by Matilda O. Abbey (pages 101, 118ff and 125) [incorrectly gives September 12 as death date]

U.S. House of Representatives
Preceded by John C. Spencer, Benjamin Ellicott	Member of the U.S. House of Representatives from New York's 21st congressional district 1819–1821 with Nathaniel Allen	Succeeded by Elijah Spencer
Preceded by new district	Member of the U.S. House of Representatives from New York's 22nd congressional district 1821–1823	Succeeded by Justin Dwinell
New district	Member of the U.S. House of Representatives from New York's 30th congressional district 1823–1825	Succeeded by Daniel G. Garnsey
New York State Senate
Preceded by Ethan B. Allen	New York State Senate; Eighth District (Class 3); 1830–1837	Succeeded by William A. Moseley
