= Elias Whitmore =

American politician (1772–1853)

Member of the U.S. House of Representatives from New York's 21st district
- In office March 4, 1825 – March 3, 1827
- Preceded by: Lot Clark
- Succeeded by: John C. Clark

Personal details
- Born: March 2, 1772 Pembroke, New Hampshire
- Died: December 26, 1853 (aged 81) Windsor, New York, U.S.
- Resting place: Village Cemetery, Windsor, New York, U.S.
- Party: Adams
- Occupation: Politician

Elias Whitmore (March 2, 1772 – December 26, 1853) was a United States representative from New York.

== Life ==
He completed preparatory studies and removed to Windsor, New York, where he engaged in mercantile pursuits.

Whitmore was elected as an Adams man to the 19th United States Congress, holding office from March 4, 1825, to March 3, 1827.

He was buried at the Village Cemetery in Windsor, New York.

== Sources ==
- United States Congress. "Elias Whitmore (id: W000423)". Biographical Directory of the United States Congress.

U.S. House of Representatives
Preceded by Lot Clark	Member of the U.S. House of Representatives from New York's 21st congressional district 1825–1827	Succeeded by John C. Clark
