= John V. L. Pruyn =

American politician and businessman (1811–1877)

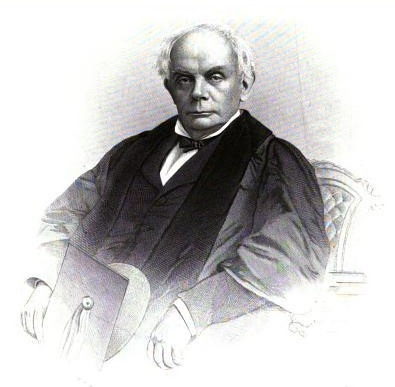
- From the August 1888 issue of the Magazine of Western History

Member of the U.S. House of Representatives from New York's 14th district
- In office March 4, 1867 – March 3, 1869
- Preceded by: Charles Goodyear
- Succeeded by: Stephen L. Mayham
- In office December 7, 1863 – March 3, 1865
- Preceded by: Erastus Corning
- Succeeded by: Charles Goodyear

Member of the New York State Senate from the 13th district
- In office 1862–1863
- Preceded by: Andrew J. Colvin
- Succeeded by: Ira Shafer

Chancellor of the Board of Regents of the University of the State of New York
- In office 1862–1877
- Preceded by: Gerrit Y. Lansing
- Succeeded by: Erastus C. Benedict

Personal details
- Born: John Van Schaick Lansing Pruyn; June 22, 1811 Albany, New York, U.S.
- Died: November 21, 1877 (aged 66) Clifton Springs, New York, U.S.
- Resting place: Albany Rural Cemetery
- Party: Democratic
- Spouse(s): Harriet Corning Turner (m. 1840-1859, her death); Anna Fenn Parker (m. 1865-1877, his death)
- Relations: Robert H. Pruyn (cousin); Amasa J. Parker (father-in-law); William Gorham Rice (son-in-law); Charles Sumner Hamlin (son-in-law)
- Children: 8

John Van Schaick Lansing Pruyn (June 22, 1811 – November 21, 1877) was an American lawyer, businessman and politician from Albany, New York. His business ventures included banking and railroads, often in partnership with longtime friend Erastus Corning, who was the uncle of Pruyn's first wife. Pruyn served in state and federal legislative offices, and was most notable for his terms as a United States representative from New York during the latter half of the American Civil War and the early days of Reconstruction.

== Early life ==
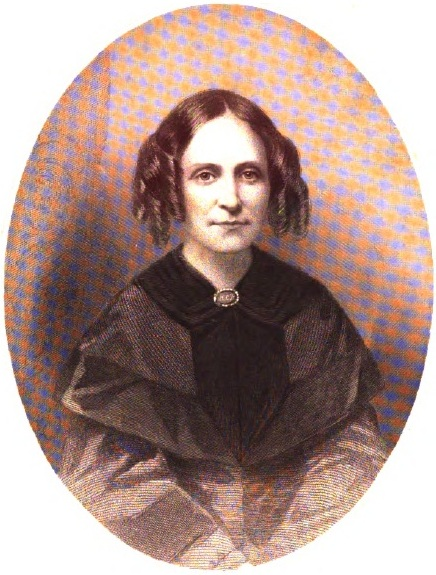
Harriet Corning Turner, first wife of John V. L. Pruyn

Pruyn was born in Albany, New York, on June 22, 1811, the son of David Pruyn and Hibertje Lansing Pruyn. His last name is pronounced to rhyme with "shine" and he was of Dutch descent, with Van Schaick ("Van Skoik"), Lansing and Pruyn all being prominent Dutch family names in upstate New York. Pruyn pursued classical studies and graduated from The Albany Academy in 1826. He studied law with Albany attorney James King, was admitted to the bar in 1832, and commenced practice in Albany.

In addition to practicing law, Pruyn was successful in several business ventures, often in partnership with Erastus Corning, who was the uncle of Pruyn's first wife. His business interests included the Albany City Bank, of which Pruyn was an incorporator and the longtime vice president. In addition, he helped organize the New York Central Railroad system, and was one of its main shareholders.

== Later career ==
Pruyn was elected a member of the Albany Institute in 1831, and served as president from 1857 until his death. He was appointed a regent of the University of the State of New York in 1844, and served as chancellor from 1868 until his death. Pruyn was also a founding trustee of St. Stephen's College, which was later renamed Bard College. In addition, he served on the New York State Board of Charities and on the commission that designed and built the New York State Capitol. Pruyn had the honor of laying the new capitol's first stone, which he did in an 1869 ceremony that included Governor John T. Hoffman and other prominent dignitaries.

Pruyn received the honorary degree of Master of Arts from Rutgers College in 1835. He received an honorary Master of Arts from Union College in 1845, and an honorary LL.D. from the University of Rochester in 1852.

Pruyn was a member of the New York State Senate (13th D.) in 1862 and 1863.

=== Congress ===
He was elected as a Democrat to the 38th United States Congress, to fill the vacancy caused by the resignation of Erastus Corning, holding office from December 7, 1863, to March 3, 1865. Like Corning, Pruyn was a pro-Union Democrat who supported the war effort because he believed that states did not have the right to secede. Like many pro-Union Democrats, Pruyn also argued that in prosecuting the war, Abraham Lincoln's administration sometimes overstepped its authority with regard to individual liberties and civil rights.

Pruyn was elected to the 40th United States Congress, holding office from March 4, 1867, to March 3, 1869.

=== Later career ===
Afterwards he resumed his law practice and business interests.

Pruyn was a stockholder in the Central Pacific Railroad and a director of the Union Pacific Railroad. In his 1867 to 1869 term he was revealed to be one of the members of Congress who had received stock in the Crédit Mobilier. During the subsequent scandal and investigation, his name appeared on lists of Congressmen who owned shares, but records showed he had paid for his stock. He was never accused of receiving it as a bribe, or of committing any wrongdoing.

== Death and burial ==
Pruyn died in Clifton Springs, New York, on November 21, 1877. He was buried at Albany Rural Cemetery in Menands, New York.

== Family ==
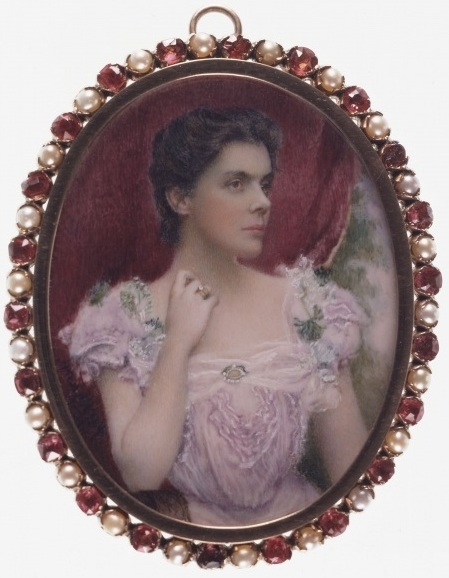
Huybertje Lansing Pruyn Hamlin, 1900

On October 22, 1840 Pruyn married Harriet Corning Turner (June 18, 1822 – March 22, 1859), the niece of Erastus Corning. They had six children, two of whom - Erastus Corning Pruyn and John V. L. Pruyn, Jr. - lived to adulthood.

After the death of his first wife Pruyn married Anna Fenn Parker (March 26, 1840 – October 7, 1909), the daughter of Amasa J. Parker. They had two daughters, Harriet Langdon Pruyn and Huybertje (also spelled Huybertie or Hibertje) Lansing Pruyn.

Erastus Corning Pruyn (August 24, 1841 – February 1, 1881) was an agent of the United States Department of State in Caracas, Venezuela, in the 1860s and traveled extensively as a student and businessman. He died in Tenerife.

John V. L. Pruyn, Jr. (March 14, 1859 – September 22, 1904) graduated from Union College in 1880 and practiced law in Albany.

Harriet Langdon Pruyn (January 31, 1868 – July 3, 1939) was the wife of William Gorham Rice. Rice was an aide to Governor Samuel Tilden and President Grover Cleveland, and succeeded Theodore Roosevelt as a member of the United States Civil Service Commission. In addition to being active in Albany civic and philanthropic causes, Harriet Langdon Pruyn was the author of a biography, 1924's Harmanus Bleecker: an Albany Dutchman, 1779-1849. (John V. L. Pruyn and Amasa J. Parker had been involved in the disposition of Bleecker's estate, which gave Harriet Pruyn access to Bleecker's papers.)

Huybertje Lansing Pruyn (April 8, 1878—March 6, 1964) was the wife of Charles Sumner Hamlin. She was the author of Memories of an Albany Girlhood (also published as An Albany Girlhood).

Pruyn's extended family included cousin Robert H. Pruyn, a prominent lawyer, militia general, diplomat, and politician.

New York State Senate
Preceded by Andrew J. Colvin	New York State Senate; 13th District; 1862–1863	Succeeded by Ira Shafer
U.S. House of Representatives
Preceded by Erastus Corning	Member of the U.S. House of Representatives from New York's 14th congressional district 1863–1865	Succeeded by Charles Goodyear
Preceded by Charles Goodyear	Member of the U.S. House of Representatives from New York's 14th congressional district 1867–1869	Succeeded by Stephen L. Mayham
Academic offices
Preceded by Gerrit Y. Lansing	Chancellor of the University of the State of New York; 1862-1877	Succeeded by Erastus C. Benedict
