= Andrew J. Colvin =

American politician

Andrew James Colvin (April 30, 1808 in Coeymans, Albany County, New York – July 8, 1889 in Albany, New York) was an American lawyer and politician from New York.

== Life ==
He was the son of James Colvin (1776–1846) and Catherine Huyck (Verplanck) Colvin (1778–1882). He attended The Albany Academy. Then he studied law in the office of Van Buren & Butler, was admitted to the bar, and practiced in Albany. He married Rosina M. Alling (1810–1843), and they had two children.

He was Corporation Counsel of Albany in 1842. On September 2, 1845, he married Margaret Crane Alling (1812–1900), a sister of his first wife, and their son was Verplanck Colvin (1847–1920), the ideator of the New York Forest Preserve.

Andrew J. Colvin was District Attorney of Albany County from 1846 to 1847, and from 1851 to 1853; and a member of the New York State Senate (13th D.) in 1860 and 1861.

He was buried at the Grove Cemetery in Coeymans.

Assemblyman John Colvin (1752–1814) was his grandfather.

== Sources ==
- The New York Civil List compiled by Franklin Benjamin Hough, Stephen C. Hutchins and Edgar Albert Werner (1867; pg. 358, 442 and 529)
- Biographical Sketches of the State Officers and Members of the Legislature of the State of New York by William D. Murphy (1861; pg. 42ff)
- Colvin genealogy at Schenectady History
- Grove Cemetery records at Betty Fink
- OBITUARY; ANDREW J. COLVIN in NYT on July 21, 1889

New York State Senate
Preceded by George Y. Johnson	New York State Senate; 13th District; 1860–1861	Succeeded by John V. L. Pruyn
