= Elijah Spencer =

American politician

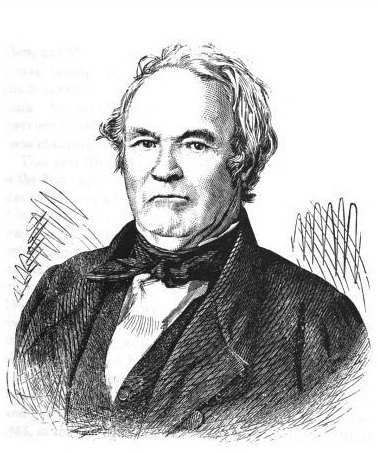

Member of the U.S. House of Representatives from New York's 21st district
- In office December 3, 1821 – March 3, 1823
- Preceded by: Nathaniel Allen; Albert H. Tracy
- Succeeded by: Lot Clark

Personal details
- Born: 1775 Columbia County, New York
- Died: December 15, 1852 (aged 76–77) Benton, Yates County, New York
- Party: Democratic-Republican

Elijah Spencer (1775 – December 15, 1852) was an American politician from New York.

== Biography ==
In 1791, he removed to Jerusalem, then in Ontario County, New York, settling in that part which was separated in 1803 as the Town of Vernon, later renamed the Town of Benton, and engaged in agricultural pursuits. He was Supervisor of the Town of Benton from 1810 to 1819. He was a member from Ontario County of the New York State Assembly in 1819.

Spencer was elected as a Democratic-Republican to the 17th United States Congress, holding office from December 3, 1821, to March 3, 1823. Afterwards he resumed his agricultural pursuits. He was again Supervisor of the Town of Benton from 1826 to 1828. He was the delegate from Yates County to the New York State Constitutional Convention of 1846.

He was buried at the Lake View Cemetery in Penn Yan, New York.

== Sources ==
- United States Congress. "Elijah Spencer (id: S000722)". Biographical Directory of the United States Congress.
- The New York Civil List compiled by Franklin Benjamin Hough (pages 59, 71, 195 and 306; Weed, Parsons and Co., 1858)

U.S. House of Representatives
Preceded by Nathaniel Allen, Albert H. Tracy	Member of the U.S. House of Representatives from New York's 21st congressional district 1821–1823	Succeeded by Lot Clark
