= Anthony Constantino (politician) =

American businessman and politician (born 1982)

- Constantino in 2026

Member-elect of the U.S. House of Representatives from New York's 21st district
- Assuming office January 3, 2027
- Succeeding: Elise Stefanik

Personal details
- Born: Anthony Thomas Constantino; October 30, 1982 (age 44) Albany, New York, U.S.
- Party: Republican
- Other political affiliations: Democratic (formerly)
- Education: Rensselaer Polytechnic Institute (attended)
- Website: Campaign website

Anthony Thomas Constantino (born October 30, 1982) is an American businessman and politician who is the U.S. representative-elect for New York's 21st congressional district. A member of the Republican Party, he was elected in November 2026 to succeed Elise Stefanik. Constantino is the co-founder and chief executive officer of the custom printing company Sticker Mule.

Constantino is a vocal supporter of Donald Trump. He has commissioned a bronze statue of Trump, now placed at the Trump International Golf Club, and recorded a rap album titled Thank You President Trump.

== Early life and education ==
Constantino graduated from The Albany Academy and attended Rensselaer Polytechnic Institute, which he left before completing a degree.

== Business career ==
While attending Rensselaer Polytechnic Institute, Constantino began managing Noteworthy, the promotional products company founded by his father, Tom Constantino. In 2010, he and Tom Cummings co-founded Sticker Mule, a custom printing company based in Amsterdam, New York. By June 2026, Sticker Mule employed more than 1,000 people worldwide.

== Political career ==
=== Early political activity ===
Constantino was previously registered as a Democrat. In October 2024, during the presidential campaign, he put up an illuminated "Vote for Trump" sign on a Sticker Mule factory in Amsterdam.

Constantino commissioned a bronze statue depicting Trump raising his fist after his 2024 attempted assassination. In 2025 he gave the statue to Trump, and it was placed at the Trump International Golf Club in West Palm Beach. The statue was valued at $250,000 in Trump's financial disclosure.

In July 2025, Constantino was sued for defamation by Conservative Party of New York State chair Gerard Kassar after Constantino claimed that Kassar had threatened to kill him—a remark Kassar said had been a political metaphor—and implied that Kassar was connected to the cutting of an aide's brake lines. In August 2025, he was sued for defamation over social media posts falsely claiming the fiancé of the Clinton County Republican chair had been charged with driving while intoxicated. As of October 2026 both lawsuits remained pending.

Constantino has released several politically themed rap songs. In September 2025, he released a music video calling Uganda-born Zohran Mamdani, then a candidate for mayor of New York City, a "terrorist" who "ain't even from here". In December 2025, he released the rap album Thank You President Trump. The Guardian described the attacks in his music as "in some cases, xenophobic and racist".

=== 2026 congressional campaign ===
In November 2025, Constantino announced his candidacy for New York's 21st congressional district seat, held by Elise Stefanik. He later said political consultant Roger Stone had encouraged him to run. Stone worked as an advisor on Constantino's campaign.

President Donald Trump endorsed Constantino in April 2026. Constantino defeated state Assemblyman Robert Smullen in the June 23 Republican primary. He lent his own campaign $17 million. He campaigned on expanding rural broadband access and strengthening security along the Canadian border.

Constantino defeated Democratic nominee Blake Gendebien in the November 3 general election by about 5,000 votes, or two percentage points, underperforming Republican gubernatorial candidate Bruce Blakeman who received 27,000 more votes in the district. In a profanity-laden victory speech, Constantino called reporters who covered him "scumbags" and "fucking assholes", blamed their coverage for denying him a margin of 20 to 30 points, and ordered a WWNY-TV news crew to leave the event. He also used the speech to call on Trump to pardon the rapper Diddy, who was convicted of transportation to engage in prostitution in 2025; he later said that Diddy was a "job creator" who would "make New York exciting again".

His term is scheduled to begin on January 3, 2027.

== Personal life ==
Starting at age 39, Constantino briefly boxed professionally in Mexico, winning his debut in 2022 and losing his second and final bout in 2023.

U.S. House of Representatives
Preceded by Elise Stefanik	Member of the U.S. House of Representatives from New York's 21st congressional district Taking office 2027	Elect
