= New York's 21st congressional district =

U.S. House district for New York

Coordinates: 44°00′30″N 74°36′33″W

- Interactive map of district boundaries since January 3, 2025
- Representative: Elise Stefanik; R–Schuylerville
- Distribution: 57.70% rural; 42.30% urban
- Population (2025): 756,769
- Median household income: $72,206
- Ethnicity: 87.6% White; 4.2% Two or more races; 3.5% Hispanic; 2.5% Black; 0.9% Asian; 0.9% Native American; 0.3% other
- Cook PVI: R+10

New York's 21st congressional district is a congressional district for the United States House of Representatives that is represented by Republican Elise Stefanik. On November 11, 2024, President Donald Trump announced his intention to nominate Stefanik to serve as the United States Ambassador to the United Nations. However, he withdrew the nomination on March 27, 2025, with former United States National Security Advisor and US representative Mike Waltz later being confirmed for the position. On December 19, 2025, Stefanik announced she would not seek re-election in the House of Representatives. In November 2026, Republican Anthony Constantino was projected to win the seat. He will assume office in January of 2027.

The district is primarily rural, but it also includes the cities of Ogdensburg, Glens Falls, Rome, and Plattsburgh. The district includes most of the Adirondack Mountains and Mohawk Valley region; prior to January 2025, it also included the Thousand Islands region. It borders Vermont to the east and Canada to the north. It also includes Fort Drum of the U.S. Army.

== History ==
Up until 1980, the 21st district was located in Upper Manhattan (including parts of Harlem and Washington Heights), and The Bronx in New York City.

Between 1983 and 1993, the district comprised all of Putnam county, and parts of Dutchess, Orange, Westchester counties.

From 2003 to 2013, the district with that number contained most of the Capital District of New York. It included all or parts of Albany, Fulton, Montgomery, Rensselaer, Saratoga, Schenectady, and Schoharie counties.

From 2013 to present, Clinton, Essex, Franklin, Fulton, Hamilton, Herkimer, Lewis, Montgomery, Schoharie, St. Lawrence, Warren, and Washington counties, and parts of Jefferson, Otsego, and Saratoga counties have composed the district.

== Counties, towns, and cities ==
For the 119th and successive Congresses (based on the districts drawn following the New York Court of Appeals' December 2023 decision in Hoffman v New York State Ind. Redistricting. Commn.), the district contains all or portions of the following counties, towns, and cities.

Clinton County (15)

All 15 towns and cities

Essex County (18)

All 18 towns

Franklin County (19)

All 19 towns

Fulton County (12)

All 16 towns and cities

Hamilton County (9)

All nine towns and municipalities

Herkimer County (23)

All 23 towns and cities

Jefferson County (4)

Antwerp (town) (part; also 24th; includes Antwerp (village) and Oxbow), Le Ray, Philadelphia, Wilna

Lewis County (17)

All 17 towns and cities

Montgomery County (8)

Canajoharie, Charleston, Glen, Minden, Mohawk, Palatine, Root, St. Johnsville

Oneida County (17)

Annsville, Ava, Boonville, Camden, Deerfield, Florence, Floyd, Forestport, Lee, Marcy, Remsen, Rome, Steuben, Trenton, Verona (part; also 22nd; includes Durhamville and part of Verona CDP), Vienna, Western

St. Lawrence County (33)

All 33 towns and cities

Saratoga County (10)

Corinth, Day, Edinburg, Greenfield, Hadley, Moreau, Northumberland, Providence, Saratoga, Wilton (part; also 20th)

Schoharie County (16)

All 16 towns

Warren County (12)

All 12 towns and cities

Washington County (17)

All 17 towns

== Recent election results from statewide races ==
Year	Office	Results
2008	President	Obama 50% – 48%
2012	President	Obama 51% – 49%
2016	President	Trump 56% – 37%
2016	Senate	Schumer 56% – 41%
2018	Senate	Gillibrand 51% – 49%
2018	Governor	Molinaro 61% – 33%
2018	Attorney General	Wofford 56% – 41%
2020	President	Trump 57% – 41%
2022	Senate	Pinion 60% – 40%
2022	Governor	Zeldin 66% – 34%
2022	Attorney General	Henry 62% – 38%
2022	Comptroller	Rodríguez 57% – 43%
2024	President	Trump 60% – 39%
2024	Senate	Sapraicone 55% – 44%

== List of members representing the district ==
=== 1813–1821: two seats ===
From the creation of the district in 1813 to 1821, two seats were apportioned, elected at-large on a general ticket.

Congress	Years	Seat A			Seat B		
Congress	Years	Representative	Party	Electoral history	Representative	Party	Electoral history
13th	March 4, 1813 – March 3, 1815	Samuel M. Hopkins (New York)	Federalist	Elected in 1812. [data missing]	Nathaniel W. Howell (Canandaigua)	Federalist	Elected in 1812. [data missing]
14th	March 4, 1815 – January 23, 1816	Micah Brooks (East Bloomfield)	Democratic-Republican	Elected in 1814. [data missing]	Peter Buell Porter (Buffalo)	Democratic-Republican	Re-elected in 1814. Resigned to become a commissioner under the Treaty of Ghent.
14th	January 23, 1816 – December 2, 1816	Micah Brooks (East Bloomfield)	Democratic-Republican	Elected in 1814. [data missing]	Vacant		
14th	December 2, 1816 – March 3, 1817	Micah Brooks (East Bloomfield)	Democratic-Republican	Elected in 1814. [data missing]	Archibald S. Clarke (Clarence)	Democratic-Republican	Elected April 30 – May 2, 1816, to finish Porter's term and seated December 2, 1816. [data missing]
15th	March 4, 1817 – March 3, 1819	Benjamin Ellicott (Batavia)	Democratic-Republican	Elected in 1816. [data missing]	John Canfield Spencer (Canandaigua)	Democratic-Republican	Elected in 1816. Retired to run for U.S. senator
16th	March 4, 1819 – March 3, 1821	Nathaniel Allen (Richmond)	Democratic-Republican	Elected in 1818. Lost re-election.	Albert H. Tracy (Buffalo)	Democratic-Republican	Elected in 1818. Redistricted to the 22nd district.

=== 1821–present: one seat ===
Member	Party	Years	Cong ress	Electoral history	Counties represented
Vacant		March 4, 1821 – December 3, 1821	17th	Elections were held in April 1821. It is unclear when results were announced or credentials issued.	1821–1823; Chenango and Broome counties.
Elijah Spencer (Benton)	Democratic-Republican	December 3, 1821 – March 3, 1823	17th	Elected in 1821. [data missing]	1821–1823; Chenango and Broome counties.
Lot Clark (Norwich)	Democratic-Republican	March 4, 1823 – March 3, 1825	18th	Elected in 1822. [data missing]	1823–1833; Chenango and Broome counties
Elias Whitmore (Windsor)	Anti-Jacksonian	March 4, 1825 – March 3, 1827	19th	Elected in 1824. [data missing]	1823–1833; Chenango and Broome counties
John C. Clark (Bainbridge)	Jacksonian	March 4, 1827 – March 3, 1829	20th	Elected in 1826. [data missing]	1823–1833; Chenango and Broome counties
Robert Monell (Greene)	Jacksonian	March 4, 1829 – February 21, 1831	21st	Elected in 1828. [data missing] Resigned to become Judge of the Sixth State Circuit Court	1823–1833; Chenango and Broome counties
Vacant		February 22, 1831 – March 3, 1831	21st		1823–1833; Chenango and Broome counties
John A. Collier (Binghamton)	Anti-Masonic	March 4, 1831 – March 3, 1833	22nd	Elected in 1830. [data missing]	1823–1833; Chenango and Broome counties
Henry Mitchell (Norwich)	Jacksonian	March 4, 1833 – March 3, 1835	23rd	Elected in 1832. [data missing]	1833–1843 [data missing]
William Mason (Preston)	Jacksonian	March 4, 1835 – March 3, 1837	24th	Elected in 1834. [data missing]	1833–1843 [data missing]
John C. Clark (Bainbridge)	Democratic	March 4, 1837 – March 3, 1839	25th 26th 27th	Elected in 1836. Re-elected in 1838. Re-elected in 1840. [data missing]	1833–1843 [data missing]
John C. Clark (Bainbridge)	Whig	March 4, 1839 – March 3, 1843	25th 26th 27th	Elected in 1836. Re-elected in 1838. Re-elected in 1840. [data missing]	1833–1843 [data missing]
Jeremiah E. Cary (Cherry Valley)	Democratic	March 4, 1843 – March 3, 1845	28th	Elected in 1842. [data missing]	1843–1853 [data missing]
Charles Goodyear (Schoharie)	Democratic	March 4, 1845 – March 3, 1847	29th	Elected in 1844. [data missing]	1843–1853 [data missing]
George A. Starkweather (Cooperstown)	Democratic	March 4, 1847 – March 3, 1849	30th	Elected in 1846. [data missing]	1843–1853 [data missing]
Hiram Walden (Waldensville)	Democratic	March 4, 1849 – March 3, 1851	31st	Elected in 1848. [data missing]	1843–1853 [data missing]
William W. Snow (Oneonta)	Democratic	March 4, 1851 – March 3, 1853	32nd	Elected in 1850. [data missing]	1843–1853 [data missing]
Henry Bennett (New Berlin)	Whig	March 4, 1853 – March 3, 1855	33rd 34th 35th	Redistricted from the 22nd district and re-elected in 1852. Re-elected in 1854. Re-elected in 1856. Lost re-election.	1853–1863 [data missing]
Henry Bennett (New Berlin)	Opposition	March 4, 1855 – March 3, 1857	33rd 34th 35th	Redistricted from the 22nd district and re-elected in 1852. Re-elected in 1854. Re-elected in 1856. Lost re-election.	1853–1863 [data missing]
Henry Bennett (New Berlin)	Republican	March 4, 1857 – March 3, 1859	33rd 34th 35th	Redistricted from the 22nd district and re-elected in 1852. Re-elected in 1854. Re-elected in 1856. Lost re-election.	1853–1863 [data missing]
R. Holland Duell (Cortland)	Republican	March 4, 1859 – March 3, 1863	36th 37th	Elected in 1858. Re-elected in 1860. [data missing]	1853–1863 [data missing]
Francis Kernan (Utica)	Democratic	March 4, 1863 – March 3, 1865	38th	Elected in 1862. [data missing]	1863–1873 [data missing]
Roscoe Conkling (Utica)	Republican	March 4, 1865 – March 3, 1867	39th	Elected in 1864. [data missing] Re-elected in 1866 but declined when instead elected U.S. senator.	1863–1873 [data missing]
Vacant		March 4, 1867 – November 29, 1867	40th		1863–1873 [data missing]
Alexander H. Bailey (Rome)	Republican	November 30, 1867 – March 3, 1871	40th 41st	Elected to finish the vacant term. Re-elected in 1868. [data missing]	1863–1873 [data missing]
Ellis H. Roberts (Utica)	Republican	March 4, 1871 – March 3, 1873	42nd	Elected in 1870. Redistricted to the 22nd district.	1863–1873 [data missing]
Clinton L. Merriam (Locust Grove)	Republican	March 4, 1873 – March 3, 1875	43rd	Redistricted from the 20th district and re-elected in 1872. [data missing]	1873–1883 [data missing]
Samuel F. Miller (Franklin)	Republican	March 4, 1875 – March 3, 1877	44th	Elected in 1874. [data missing]	1873–1883 [data missing]
Solomon Bundy (Oxford)	Republican	March 4, 1877 – March 3, 1879	45th	Elected in 1876. [data missing]	1873–1883 [data missing]
David Wilber (Milford)	Republican	March 4, 1879 – March 3, 1881	46th	Elected in 1878. [data missing]	1873–1883 [data missing]
Ferris Jacobs Jr. (Delhi)	Republican	March 4, 1881 – March 3, 1883	47th	Elected in 1880. [data missing]	1873–1883 [data missing]
George W. Ray (Chenango)	Republican	March 4, 1883 – March 3, 1885	48th	Elected in 1882. [data missing]	1883–1893 [data missing]
Frederick A. Johnson (Glens Falls)	Republican	March 4, 1885 – March 3, 1887	49th	Redistricted from the 18th district and re-elected in 1884. [data missing]	1883–1893 [data missing]
John H. Moffitt (Chateaugay Lake)	Republican	March 4, 1887 – March 3, 1891	50th 51st	Elected in 1886. Re-elected in 1888. [data missing]	1883–1893 [data missing]
John M. Wever (Plattsburg)	Republican	March 4, 1891 – March 3, 1893	52nd	Elected in 1890. [data missing] Redistricted to the 23rd district.	1883–1893 [data missing]
Simon J. Schermerhorn (Schenectady)	Democratic	March 4, 1893 – March 3, 1895	53rd	Elected in 1892. [data missing]	1893–1899 [data missing]
David F. Wilber (Oneonta)	Republican	March 4, 1895 – March 3, 1899	54th 55th	Elected in 1894. Re-elected in 1896. [data missing]	1893–1899 [data missing]
John K. Stewart (Amsterdam)	Republican	March 4, 1899 – March 3, 1903	56th 57th	Elected in 1898. Re-elected in 1900. [data missing]	1899–1903; All of Columbia, Dutchess, Greene and Putnam counties
John H. Ketcham (Dover Plains)	Republican	March 4, 1903 – November 4, 1906	58th 59th	Redistricted from the 18th district and re-elected in 1902. Re-elected in 1904. Died.	1903–1913 [data missing]
Vacant		November 5, 1906 – March 3, 1907	59th		1903–1913 [data missing]
Samuel McMillan (Lake Mahopac)	Republican	March 4, 1907 – March 3, 1909	60th	Elected in 1906. [data missing]	1903–1913 [data missing]
Hamilton Fish II (Garrison)	Republican	March 4, 1909 – March 3, 1911	61st	Elected in 1908. [data missing]	1903–1913 [data missing]
Richard E. Connell (Poughkeepsie)	Democratic	March 4, 1911 – October 30, 1912	62nd	Elected in 1910. Died.	1903–1913 [data missing]
Vacant		October 31, 1912 – March 3, 1913	62nd		1903–1913 [data missing]
Henry George Jr. (New York)	Democratic	March 4, 1913 – March 3, 1915	63rd	Redistricted from the 17th district and re-elected in 1912. [data missing]	1913–1963; Parts of New York
G. Murray Hulbert (New York)	Democratic	March 4, 1915 – January 1, 1918	64th 65th	Elected in 1914. Re-elected in 1916. Re-elected in 1918. Resigned to become Commissioner of Docks and Director of the Port of New York City	1913–1963; Parts of New York
Vacant		January 2, 1918 – March 5, 1918	65th		1913–1963; Parts of New York
Jerome F. Donovan (New York)	Democratic	March 5, 1918 – March 3, 1921	65th 66th	Elected to finish Hulbert's term. [data missing]	1913–1963; Parts of New York
Martin C. Ansorge (New York)	Republican	March 4, 1921 – March 3, 1923	67th	Elected in 1920. [data missing]	1913–1963; Parts of New York
Royal H. Weller (New York)	Democratic	March 4, 1923 – March 1, 1929	68th 69th 70th	Elected in 1922. Re-elected in 1924. Re-elected in 1926. Re-elected in 1928. Died.	1913–1963; Parts of New York
Vacant		March 2, 1929 – November 4, 1929	70th 71st		1913–1963; Parts of New York
Joseph A. Gavagan (New York)	Democratic	November 5, 1929 – December 30, 1943	71st 72nd 73rd 74th 75th 76th 77th 78th	Elected to finish Weller's term. Re-elected in 1930. Re-elected in 1932. Re-elected in 1934. Re-elected in 1936. Re-elected in 1938. Re-elected in 1940. Re-elected in 1942. Resigned when elected justice of New York Supreme Court.	1913–1963; Parts of New York
Vacant		December 31, 1943 – February 28, 1944	78th		1913–1963; Parts of New York
James H. Torrens (New York)	Democratic	February 29, 1944 – January 3, 1947	78th 79th	Elected to finish Gavagan's term. Re-elected in 1944. [data missing]	1913–1963; Parts of New York
Jacob K. Javits (New York)	Republican	January 3, 1947 – December 31, 1954	80th 81st 82nd 83rd	Elected in 1946. Re-elected in 1948. Re-elected in 1950. Re-elected in 1952. Retired to run for N.Y. Attorney General. Resigned to become New York State Attorney General.	1913–1963; Parts of New York
Vacant		December 31, 1954 – January 3, 1955	83rd		1913–1963; Parts of New York
Herbert Zelenko (New York)	Democratic	January 3, 1955 – January 3, 1963	84th 85th 86th 87th	Elected in 1954. Re-elected in 1956. Re-elected in 1958. Re-elected in 1960. [data missing]	1913–1963; Parts of New York
James C. Healey (New York)	Democratic	January 3, 1963 – January 3, 1965	88th	Redistricted from the 22nd district and re-elected in 1962. [data missing]	1963–1965; Parts of Bronx
James H. Scheuer (New York)	Democratic	January 3, 1965 – January 3, 1971	89th 90th 91st 92nd	Elected in 1964. Re-elected in 1966. Re-elected in 1968. Re-elected in 1970. [data missing]	1965–1973 Parts of Bronx, Manhattan, Queens
James H. Scheuer (New York)	Democratic	January 3, 1971 – January 3, 1973	89th 90th 91st 92nd	Elected in 1964. Re-elected in 1966. Re-elected in 1968. Re-elected in 1970. [data missing]	1965–1973 Parts of Bronx, Manhattan, Queens
Herman Badillo (The Bronx)	Democratic	January 3, 1973 – December 31, 1977	93rd 94th 95th	Redistricted from the 22nd district and re-elected in 1972. Re-elected in 1974. Re-elected in 1976. Resigned to become Deputy Mayor of New York City.	1973–1983; Parts of Bronx
Vacant		January 1, 1978 – February 20, 1978	95th		1973–1983; Parts of Bronx
Robert Garcia (The Bronx)	Democratic	February 21, 1978 – January 3, 1983	95th 96th 97th	Elected to finish Badillo's term. Re-elected in 1978. Re-elected in 1980. Redistricted to the 18th district.	1973–1983; Parts of Bronx
Hamilton Fish IV (Millbrook)	Republican	January 3, 1983 – January 3, 1993	98th 99th 100th 101st 102nd	Redistricted from the 25th district and re-elected in 1982. Re-elected in 1984. Re-elected in 1986. Re-elected in 1988. Re-elected in 1990. Redistricted to the 19th district.	1983–1993; All of Putnam; parts of Dutchess, Orange, Westchester
Michael McNulty (Green Island)	Democratic	January 3, 1993 – January 3, 2009	103rd 104th 105th 106th 107th 108th 109th 110th	Redistricted from the 23rd district and re-elected in 1992. Re-elected in 1994. Re-elected in 1996. Re-elected in 1998. Re-elected in 2000. Re-elected in 2002. Re-elected in 2004. Re-elected in 2006. Retired.	1993–2003; All of Albany, Schenectady; parts of Montgomery, Rensselaer, Saratoga
Michael McNulty (Green Island)	Democratic	January 3, 1993 – January 3, 2009	103rd 104th 105th 106th 107th 108th 109th 110th	Redistricted from the 23rd district and re-elected in 1992. Re-elected in 1994. Re-elected in 1996. Re-elected in 1998. Re-elected in 2000. Re-elected in 2002. Re-elected in 2004. Re-elected in 2006. Retired.	2003–2013; All of Albany, Montgomery, Schenectady, Schoharie; parts of Fulton, Rensselaer, Saratoga
Paul Tonko (Amsterdam)	Democratic	January 3, 2009 – January 3, 2013	111th 112th	Elected in 2008. Re-elected in 2010. Redistricted to the 20th district.	2003–2013; All of Albany, Montgomery, Schenectady, Schoharie; parts of Fulton, Rensselaer, Saratoga
Bill Owens (Plattsburgh)	Democratic	January 3, 2013 – January 3, 2015	113th	Redistricted from the 23rd district and re-elected in 2012. Retired.	2013–2023; All of Clinton, Essex, Franklin, Fulton, Hamilton, Jefferson, Lewis, St. Lawrence, Warren, Washington; parts of Herkimer, Saratoga
Elise Stefanik (Schuylerville)	Republican	January 3, 2015 – present	114th 115th 116th 117th 118th 119th	Elected in 2014. Re-elected in 2016. Re-elected in 2018. Re-elected in 2020. Re-elected in 2022. Re-elected in 2024. Retiring at end of term.	2013–2023; All of Clinton, Essex, Franklin, Fulton, Hamilton, Jefferson, Lewis, St. Lawrence, Warren, Washington; parts of Herkimer, Saratoga
Elise Stefanik (Schuylerville)	Republican	January 3, 2015 – present	114th 115th 116th 117th 118th 119th	Elected in 2014. Re-elected in 2016. Re-elected in 2018. Re-elected in 2020. Re-elected in 2022. Re-elected in 2024. Retiring at end of term.	2023–2025; All of Clinton, Essex, Franklin, Fulton, Hamilton, Herkimer, Lewis, Montgomery, Schoharie, St. Lawrence, Warren, Washington; parts of Jefferson, Otsego, Rensselaer
Elise Stefanik (Schuylerville)	Republican	January 3, 2015 – present	114th 115th 116th 117th 118th 119th	Elected in 2014. Re-elected in 2016. Re-elected in 2018. Re-elected in 2020. Re-elected in 2022. Re-elected in 2024. Retiring at end of term.	2025–present All of Clinton, Essex, Franklin, Fulton, Hamilton, Herkimer, Lewis, Schoharie, St. Lawrence, Warren, Washington; parts of Jefferson, Montgomery, Oneida, Saratoga
Anthony Constantino (Edinburg)	Republican	Assuming office on January 3, 2027		Elected in 2026.	2025–present All of Clinton, Essex, Franklin, Fulton, Hamilton, Herkimer, Lewis, Schoharie, St. Lawrence, Warren, Washington; parts of Jefferson, Montgomery, Oneida, Saratoga

== Recent election results ==
1996 United States House of Representatives elections in New York: New York's 21st district
Party	Candidate	Votes	%	±%
Democratic	Michael McNulty (incumbent)	158,491	66.1	
Republican	Nancy Norman	64,471	26.9	
Liberal	Lee H. Wasserman	16,794	7.0	
Margin of victory		94,020	39.2	
Turnout		239,756	100	

1998 United States House of Representatives elections in New York: New York's 21st district
Party	Candidate	Votes	%	±%
Democratic	Michael McNulty (incumbent)	146,639	74.2	+8.1
Republican	Lauren Ayers	50,931	25.8	−1.1
Margin of victory		95,708	48.4	+9.2
Turnout		197,570	100	−17.6

2000 United States House of Representatives elections in New York: New York's 21st district
Party	Candidate	Votes	%	±%
Democratic	Michael McNulty (incumbent)	175,339	74.4	+0.2
Republican	Thomas G. Pillsworth	60,333	25.6	−0.2
Margin of victory		115,006	48.8	+0.3
Turnout		235,672	100	+19.2

2002 United States House of Representatives elections in New York: New York's 21st district
Party	Candidate	Votes	%	±%
Democratic	Michael McNulty (incumbent)	161,329	75.1	+0.7
Republican	Charles B. Rosenstein	53,525	24.9	−0.7
Margin of victory		107,804	50.2	+1.4
Turnout		214,854	100	−8.8

2004 United States House of Representatives elections in New York: New York's 21st district
Party	Candidate	Votes	%	±%
Democratic	Michael McNulty (incumbent)	194,033	70.8	−4.3
Republican	Warren Redlich	80,121	29.2	+4.3
Margin of victory		113,912	41.6	−8.6
Turnout		274,154	100	+27.6

2006 United States House of Representatives elections in New York: New York's 21st district
Party	Candidate	Votes	%	±%
Democratic	Michael McNulty (incumbent)	167,604	78.2	+7.4
Republican	Warren Redlich	46,752	21.8	−7.4
Margin of victory		120,852	56.4	+14.8
Turnout		214,356	100	−21.8

2008 United States House of Representatives elections in New York: New York's 21st district
Party	Candidate	Votes	%	±%
Democratic	Paul Tonko	171,286	62.1	−16.1
Republican	Jim Burhmaster	96,599	35	+13.2
Independence	Philip Steck	7,965	2.9	+2.9
Margin of victory		74,687	27.1	−29.3
Turnout		275,872	100	+28.69

2010 United States House of Representatives elections in New York: New York's 21st district
Party	Candidate	Votes	%	±%
Democratic	Paul Tonko (incumbent)	124,889	59.3	−2.8
Republican	Theodore J. Danz Jr.	85,752	40.7	+5.7
Margin of victory		39,137	18.6	−8.5
Turnout		210,791	100	−23.58

2012 United States House of Representatives elections in New York: New York's 21st district
Party	Candidate	Votes	%	±%
Democratic	Bill Owens	126,631	50.1	−9.2
Republican	Matt Doheny	121,646	48.2	+7.5
Green	Donald L. Hassig	4,174	1.7	+1.7
Margin of victory		4,985	1.9	−16.7
Turnout		252,556	100	+19.8

2014 United States House of Representatives elections in New York: New York's 21st district
Party	Candidate	Votes	%	±%
Republican	Elise Stefanik	96,226	55.1	+6.9
Democratic	Aaron G. Woolf	59,063	33.8	−16.3
Green	Matthew J. Funiciello	19,238	11	+9.3
Margin of victory		37,163	21.3	+19.4
Turnout		174,668	100	−30.8

2016 United States House of Representatives elections in New York: New York's 21st district
Party	Candidate	Votes	%	±%
Republican	Elise Stefanik (incumbent)	177,886	65.3	+10.2
Democratic	Mike Derrick	82,161	30.1	−3.7
Green	Matthew J. Funiciello	12,452	4.6	−6.4
Margin of victory		95,725	35.2	+13.9
Turnout		272,606	100	+56.1

2018 United States House of Representatives elections in New York: New York's 21st district
Party	Candidate	Votes	%	±%
Republican	Elise Stefanik (incumbent)	131,981	56.1	−9.2
Democratic	Tedra Cobb	99,791	42.4	+12.3
Green	Lynn Kahn	3,437	1.5	−3.1
Margin of victory		32,190	13.7	−21.5
Turnout		235,267	100	−13.7

2020 United States House of Representatives elections in New York: New York's 21st district
Party	Candidate	Votes	%	±%
Republican	Elise Stefanik (incumbent)	188,655	58.8	+2.7
Democratic	Tedra Cobb	131,995	41.2	−1.2
Margin of victory		56,660	17.6	+3.9
Turnout		320,788	100	+36.4

2022 United States House of Representatives elections in New York: New York's 21st district
Party	Candidate	Votes	%	±%
Republican	Elise Stefanik (incumbent)	168,579	59.1	+0.3
Democratic	Matt Castelli	116,421	40.8	−0.4
Margin of victory		52,158	18.3	+0.7
Turnout		285,000	100	−11.2

2024 United States House of Representatives elections in New York: New York's 21st district
Party	Candidate	Votes	%	±%
Republican	Elise Stefanik (incumbent)	216,513	62.1	+3
Democratic	Paula Collins	131,930	37.9	−2.9
Margin of victory		84,583	24.2	+5.9
Turnout		348,443	100	+22.3

2026 United States House of Representatives elections in New York: New York's 21st district
Party	Candidate	Votes	%	±%
Republican	Anthony Constantino	140,428	50.8	−11.3
Democratic	Blake Gendebien	135,187	48.9	+11
Margin of victory		5,241	1.9	−22.3
Turnout		275,615	100	−20.9

== See also ==
- List of United States congressional districts
- New York's congressional delegations
- New York's congressional districts
