= John C. Clark =

American politician

Member of the U.S. House of Representatives from New York's 21st district
- In office March 4, 1837 – March 3, 1843
- Preceded by: Elias Whitmore
- Succeeded by: Robert Monell
- In office March 4, 1827 – March 3, 1829
- Preceded by: William Mason
- Succeeded by: Jeremiah E. Cary

Personal details
- Born: John Chamberlain Clark; January 14, 1793 Pittsfield, Massachusetts
- Died: October 25, 1852 (aged 59) Elmira, New York
- Resting place: St. Peter's Churchyard in Bainbridge
- Party: Jacksonian; Democrat; Whig

John Chamberlain Clark (January 14, 1793 – October 25, 1852) was an American lawyer and politician who served four terms as a United States representative from New York from 1827 to 1829 and from 1837 to 1843.

== Biography ==
Clark was born in Pittsfield, Massachusetts, on January 14, 1793. He graduated from Williams College in Williamstown, Massachusetts, in 1811. Clark then studied law, was admitted to the bar and commenced practice in Hamilton, New York.

=== Political career ===
In 1818, Clark moved to Bainbridge. A Democratic-Republican, then a Jacksonian and later a Democrat, he served as District Attorney of Chenango County from 1823 to 1827.

=== Tenure in Congress ===
In 1826, he was elected to the United States House of Representatives 21 District and he served in the 20th United States Congress, March 4, 1827 to March 3, 1829. He resumed practicing law and in 1836 returned to the U.S. House, again representing the 21st District. He began his term as a Democrat, but switched to the Whig Party in 1837 because he favored continuation of the Second Bank of the United States rather than the independent Treasury favored by President Martin Van Buren and the Democrats. Clark was re-elected to Congress as a Whig in 1838 and 1840, ultimately serving in the 25th, 26th, and 27th Congresses, serving from March 4, 1837 to March 3, 1843.

=== Later career ===
Clark did not run for re-election in 1842, and resumed practicing law. He later moved to Chemung County and became active in the lumber business. Following the Whig victory in the 1848 election for President, Clark was appointed First Auditor of the Treasury and he served from August 2, 1849, to October 31, 1849. He was Solicitor of the United States Treasury from October 31, 1849, until his death.

=== Death and burial ===
Clark died in Elmira on October 25, 1852. He was buried at St. Peter's Churchyard in Bainbridge.

U.S. House of Representatives
Preceded by Elias Whitmore	Member of the U.S. House of Representatives from New York's 21st congressional district 1827–1829	Succeeded by Robert Monell
Preceded by William Mason	Member of the U.S. House of Representatives from New York's 21st congressional district 1837–1843	Succeeded by Jeremiah E. Cary
