= Lot Clark =

American politician (1788–1862)

New York State Assembly, Niagara County
- In office 1846

District attorney of Chenango County
- In office 1828–1829

Member of the House of Representatives from New York's 21st District
- In office March 4, 1823 – March 3, 1825
- Preceded by: Elijah Spencer
- Succeeded by: Elias Whitmore

District attorney of Chenango County
- In office 1822–1823

Personal details
- Born: May 23, 1788 Hillsdale, New York
- Died: December 18, 1862 (aged 74) Buffalo, New York
- Party: Crawford Democratic-Republican
- Spouse: Lavinia Crosby
- Children: Hiram and Lot Jr.
- Occupation: lawyer

Lot Clark (May 23, 1788 in Hillsdale, Columbia County, New York – December 18, 1862 in Buffalo, Erie County, New York) was an American lawyer and politician from New York.

== Life ==
Clark removed with his parents to Otsego County in 1796. He pursued academic studies and studied law. He was admitted to the bar in 1816, and practiced in Norwich. He married Lavinia Crosby, and their children were Hiram Carter Clark (1816–1891) and Lot Curran Clark (1819–1880).

He was District Attorney of Chenango County in 1822 and 1823. Clark was elected as a Crawford Democratic-Republican to the 18th United States Congress, holding office from March 4, 1823, to March 3, 1825. He was appointed postmaster of Norwich on April 29, 1825, and served until April 12, 1828. He was again D.A. of Chenango County from 1828 to 1829.

In 1829, he removed to Lockport, and continued the practice of law there. He was President of the Lockport Bank, and the local agent for the Albany Land Company, a group of investors who had bought large tracts of lands in Niagara and Orleans counties and in the northern parts of Genesee and Erie counties.

In 1835, he removed to Buffalo. He was a member from Niagara County of the New York State Assembly in 1846. Later he was President of the Niagara Falls International Bridge Company, the American company which built the first suspension bridge over the Niagara River together with the Canadian Niagara Falls Suspension Bridge Company headed by William Hamilton Merritt.

Clark was buried at the Green-Wood Cemetery in Brooklyn.

His son Lot C. Clark was District Attorney of Richmond County, New York from 1841 to 1849.

== Sources ==
- United States Congress. "Lot Clark (id: C000447)". Biographical Directory of the United States Congress.
- The New York Civil List compiled by Franklin Benjamin Hough (pages 71, 232, 265 and 371; Weed, Parsons and Co., 1858)
- Lockport: Historic Jewel of the Erie Canal by Kathleen L. Riley (page 123)
- Niagara: A History of the Falls by Pierre Berton (page 82)
- LOT C. CLARK his son's obit in NYT on February 12, 1880

U.S. House of Representatives
Preceded by Elijah Spencer	Member of the U.S. House of Representatives from New York's 21st congressional district 1823–1825	Succeeded by Elias Whitmore
