= Jeremiah E. Cary =

American politician

Member of the U.S. House of Representatives from New York's 21st district
- In office March 4, 1843 – March 3, 1845
- Preceded by: John C. Clark
- Succeeded by: Charles Goodyear

Personal details
- Born: Jeremiah Eaton Cary; April 30, 1803 Coventry, Rhode Island
- Died: November 9, 1881 (aged 78) New York City, New York
- Resting place: Grace Episcopal Church Cemetery, Plainfield
- Party: Democratic

Jeremiah Eaton Cary (April 30, 1803 – November 9, 1881) was an American lawyer and politician who served one term as a United States representative from New York from 1843 to 1845.

== Biography ==
Cary was born in Coventry, Rhode Island on April 30, 1803, he attended public school. He moved to Cherry Valley, New York, in 1820, where he studied law. Cary was admitted to the bar in 1829 and commenced practice in New York City.

=== Congress ===
He was elected as a Democrat to the 28th United States Congress (March 4, 1843 – March 3, 1845).

=== Later career and death ===
After his term in office, he resumed the practice of law in New York City, moving to Plainfield, New Jersey in 1860, where he continued the practice of law. Cary died in 1881. He's buried at the Grace Episcopal Church Cemetery, Plainfield, N.J.

U.S. House of Representatives
Preceded by John C. Clark	Member of the U.S. House of Representatives from New York's 21st congressional district 1843–1845	Succeeded by Charles Goodyear
