= John Canfield Spencer =

American politician (1788–1855)

John Spencer
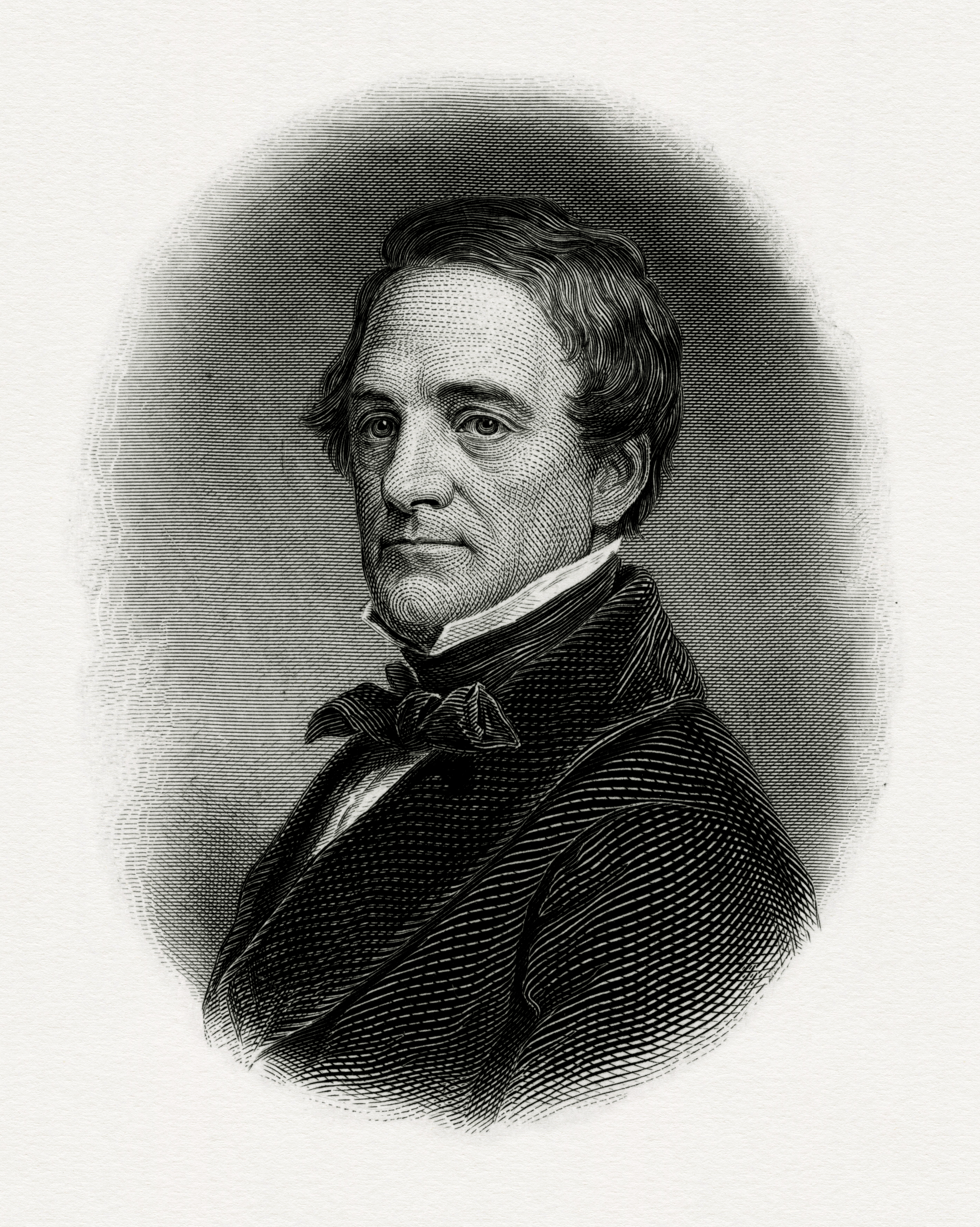

16th United States Secretary of the Treasury
- In office March 8, 1843 – May 2, 1844
- President: John Tyler
- Preceded by: Walter Forward
- Succeeded by: George M. Bibb

17th United States Secretary of War
- In office October 12, 1841 – March 4, 1843
- President: John Tyler
- Preceded by: John Bell
- Succeeded by: James Madison Porter

17th Secretary of State of New York
- In office February 4, 1839 – October 12, 1841
- Governor: William H. Seward
- Preceded by: John Adams Dix
- Succeeded by: Archibald Campbell (Acting)

Member of the New York State Senate
- In office 1825–1828

Speaker of the New York State Assembly
- In office January 4, 1820 – June 30, 1820
- Preceded by: Obadiah German
- Succeeded by: Peter Sharpe

Member of the New York State Assembly
- In office 1820–1822

Member of the U.S. House of Representatives from New York's 21st district
- In office March 4, 1817 – March 3, 1819
- Preceded by: Archibald S. Clarke
- Succeeded by: Albert H. Tracy

Personal details
- Born: John Canfield Spencer; January 8, 1788 Hudson, New York, U.S.
- Died: May 17, 1855 (aged 67) Albany, New York, U.S.
- Party: Democratic-Republican (before 1825); Adams Party (1825–30); Anti-Masonic Party (1830–34); Whig (after 1834)
- Spouse: Elizabeth Scott Smith (m. 1809)
- Relatives: Ambrose Spencer (Father)
- Education: Williams College; Union College (BA)

Military service
- Allegiance: United States
- Branch/service: United States Army
- Years of service: 1812–1814
- Battles/wars: War of 1812

John Canfield Spencer (January 8, 1788 – May 17, 1855) was an American lawyer, politician, judge and United States Cabinet secretary in the administration of President John Tyler.

After graduating from Union College in 1806, Spencer practiced law and held various positions, including master of chancery, postmaster, and attorney general. Spencer served in the U.S. House of Representatives from 1817 to 1819 and the New York State Assembly and Senate in various years between 1820 and 1833. As an anti-Mason, he investigated the disappearance of William Morgan, which sparked the Anti-Masonic movement.

In 1841, President John Tyler appointed Spencer as Secretary of War, and in 1843, he became Secretary of the Treasury. Spencer faced challenges in his role as Treasury Secretary, including a deficit, tariffs, and the development of a plan for a Board of Exchequer. President Tyler nominated Spencer for open Associate Justice seats on the Supreme Court twice in 1844, but both attempts failed. Spencer resigned as Treasury Secretary in May 1844 and returned to Albany.

Spencer married Elizabeth Scott Smith in 1809, and they had several children, many of whom died young or under unfortunate circumstances.

== Early life ==
John Canfield Spencer was born on January 8, 1788, in Hudson, New York. He was the oldest child of Ambrose Spencer, Chief Justice of the New York Supreme Court, and his first wife, Laura Canfield (1768–1807). His sister, Abby Spencer (1790–1839), was married to Albany Mayor John Townsend. His younger brother, William Augustus Spencer (1792–1854), was married to Eleanora Eliza Lorillard (1801–1843), the daughter of Peter Abraham Lorillard. His brother, Ambrose Spencer, Jr., was killed at the Battle of Lundy's Lane.

After the death of his mother in 1807, his father married Mary Clinton (1773–1808) in 1808. Mary was the daughter of James Clinton and sister of New York Governor DeWitt Clinton. After Mary's death later that same year, his father remarried again to Katherine Clinton (1778–1837), Mary's sister.

He graduated from Union College in 1806, became secretary to New York Governor Daniel D. Tompkins in 1807, studied law in Albany, New York, and was admitted to the bar in 1809.

== Career ==
After commencing practice in Canandaigua, New York, in 1809, Spencer became a master of chancery in 1811.

During the War of 1812, Spencer served in the United States Army where he was appointed brigade judge advocate general for the northern frontier. He was postmaster of Canandaigua, New York in 1814, became assistant attorney general and district attorney for the five western counties of New York in 1815 and was elected a Democratic-Republican to the United States House of Representatives in 1816, serving from March 4, 1817, to March 3, 1819. He was a member of the committee that reported unfavorably on the affairs of the Second Bank of the United States.

In 1819, he was the Clintonian candidate for U.S. Senator from New York, but due to a three-cornered contest with Bucktail Samuel Young and Federalist Rufus King, no-one was elected. He was a member of the New York State Assembly from 1820 to 1822, and was Speaker in 1820. He was a member of the New York State Senate from 1825 to 1828. He was a member of the Adams Party in 1825 and subsequently supported Henry Clay, the candidate of the National Republican Party, in the 1832 United States presidential election.

In 1826, Spencer served as a special prosecutor to investigate the disappearance of William Morgan who was arrested, kidnapped and murdered for exposing secrets kept by Freemasons, thus sparking the Anti-Masonic movement. Spencer sided with the anti-Masons and was the author of a manuscript on Masonic rituals. In 1830, he was re-elected to the New York Assembly as a member of the Anti-Masonic Party and served from 1831 to 1833. He moved to Albany, New York in 1837. He edited the English edition of Alexis de Tocqueville's Democracy in America and served as Secretary of State of New York from 1839 to 1841.

=== Federal government ===
In 1841, President John Tyler appointed Spencer to be Secretary of War in his administration. As War Secretary, he proposed a chain of posts extending from Council Bluffs, Iowa to the Columbia River. He also recommended that the government adhere to arrangements made by Army commanders in the field for compensation of the Creek Indians, who had been forced to move west of the Mississippi. In 1842, his nineteen-year-old son, Philip Spencer, a midshipman, was executed without court-martial along with two other sailors aboard the brig USS Somers for allegedly attempting mutiny.

In 1843, Spencer was appointed Secretary of the Treasury after the resignation of Walter Forward. As Treasury Secretary, he was preoccupied with the tariff and believed that the deficit and other federal expenditures should be funded by duties on imports rather than by internal taxation, something he was forced to announce for the fiscal year in 1843. The expenditures of the treasury had exceeded its receipts and he advocated additional import duties on articles such as coffee and tea. To help fund the federal deficit he engaged in controversial issues of Treasury Notes. He also continued to develop a plan, originally initiated by Forward, for a Board of Exchequer to keep and disburse public funds raised by duties. The Exchequer bill, which reflected continuing interest in some form of independent treasury system, failed due to a political conflict in the United States Congress.

On two occasions in 1844, President Tyler nominated Spencer to fill open Associate Justice seats on the Supreme Court. The first failed attempt was in January, when Tyler put forward Spencer as a replacement for the recently deceased Smith Thompson. Tyler made the nomination on January 9; on January 31, the Senate rejected Spencer by a 26–21 vote, mainly due to Whig opposition to the president. Tyler then nominated Spencer to fill Henry Baldwin's seat in June but withdrew his name for that of Reuben Hyde Walworth. As one of few northerners in an administration dominated by southern interests, Spencer had found it increasingly difficult to serve in his cabinet post and resigned as Treasury Secretary in May 1844. Thereafter, he returned to Albany.

== Personal life ==
In 1809, Spencer married Elizabeth Scott Smith (1789–1868). Together, they were the parents of several children, many of whom died in infancy or under unfortunate circumstances:

- Mary Natalie Spencer (1810–1886), who married Henry Morris (1806–1854), son of Capt. Richard Valentine Morris and grandson of Lewis Morris, in 1831.
- Laura Catherine Spencer (1812–1891), who married George W. Clinton (1807–1885), the 12th Mayor of Buffalo who was the son of DeWitt Clinton.
- Eliza Abby Spencer (1815–1816), who died young.
- Ambrose Canfield Spencer (1817–1876), who was murdered in Linn, Missouri, in 1876.
- John Canfield Spencer, Jr. (d. 1845)
- Philip Spencer (1823–1842), who was executed for mutiny in 1842.
- DeWitt Clinton Spencer (1830–1836), who also died young.

In Canandaigua, he lived for 36 years in a house at 210 Main Street, that was built by General Peter Buell Porter (1773–1844), the United States Secretary of War under John Quincy Adams, in about 1800.

He died in Albany, New York, on May 17, 1855. He was interred in Albany Rural Cemetery beside his wife, Elizabeth.

=== Descendants ===
His grandson, through his daughter Mary, was Henry Lewis Morris (b. 1845), who married Anna Rutherfurd Russell, the daughter of Archibald Russell and Helen Rutherfurd (née Watts) Russell. They were the parents of Lewis Spencer Morris (b. 1884).

His grandchildren, through his daughter Laura, included Elizabeth Spencer Clinton (1835–1918), Spencer Clinton (1839–1914), Catharine Clinton (1841–1881), and George Clinton (1846–1934).

U.S. House of Representatives
Preceded by Micah Brooks, Archibald S. Clarke	Member of the U.S. House of Representatives from New York's 21st congressional district 1817–1819; Served alongside: Benjamin Ellicott	Succeeded by Nathaniel Allen, Albert H. Tracy
Political offices
Preceded by Obadiah German	Speaker of the New York State Assembly; 1820	Succeeded by Peter Sharpe
Preceded by John Adams Dix	Secretary of State of New York; 1839–1841	Succeeded by Archibald Campbell (Acting)
Preceded by John Bell	United States Secretary of War; 1841–1843	Succeeded by James Madison Porter
Preceded by Walter Forward	United States Secretary of the Treasury; 1843–1844	Succeeded by George M. Bibb
