= Peter Porter =

Peter Porter may refer to:

- Peter Buell Porter (1773–1844), U.S. political figure and soldier
- Peter A. Porter (colonel) (1827–1864), his son, Union Army colonel
- Peter A. Porter (1853–1925), U.S. political figure and grandson of Peter Buell Porter
- Peter Porter (poet) (1929–2010), Australian-born British poet
- Peter B. Porter Jr. (1806–1871), American lawyer and politician, nephew of Peter Buell Porter
