= Augustus Porter =

Augustus S. Porter

Member of the New York Assembly
- In office July 1, 1802 – June 30, 1803
- Preceded by: Peter Buell Porter
- Succeeded by: Nathaniel W. Howell

Personal details
- Born: January 18, 1769 Salisbury; Litchfield County, Connecticut
- Died: June 10, 1849 (aged 80) Niagara Falls, New York
- Resting place: Oakwood Cemetery
- Party: Democratic-Republican
- Spouses: Lavinia Steele (m. 1796, died) Jane Howell (m. 1801; died 1841)
- Relations: Peter Buell Porter (brother)
- Children: 5
- Profession: Surveyor, farmer, businessman, politician

Augustus S. Porter (January 18, 1769 – June 10, 1849) was an American businessman, judge, farmer, and politician who served as an Assemblyman for the state of New York.

== Early life ==
Augustus Porter was born in Salisbury, Litchfield County, Connecticut, on January 18, 1769. He was one of six children born to Joshua and Abigail Buell. He attended public schools and learned surveying at an early age.

== Career ==
=== Land and development ===
Porter first visited Niagara County in 1795, surveying land throughout Western New York and Ohio. In 1796, the Connecticut Land Company employed Porter as chief surveyor, with more than fifty assistants, to make the first survey of lands on the south shore of Lake Erie.

In 1800, he moved to Canandaigua, New York and in 1805, he and his brother, Peter Buell Porter (1773–1844), with whom he had business interests across a variety of industries, moved to Niagara Falls purchasing the land near Niagara Falls, United States at a public auction in order to open a business park. The land was ceded by the Seneca Nation to the State of New York in 1802. They named the property they bought and developed Manchester, after the English city, and the area was called Manchester up until 1840. This purchase also provided them with the acquisition of the water rights to the eastern rapids both above and below Niagara Falls. In 1803, they built the first sawmill and a productive paper mill on Bath Island. Around 1805, they had a grist mill and tannery operating that was built at "Joncairs' old ditch." However, the Porter brothers were forced out of business when the Erie Canal opened 20 years later.

In 1825, the Porter brothers presented a prospectus, touting the economic advantages of developing Goat Island as an industrial site. It was a "situation... not surpassed, and probably not equaled, in the United States, as a site for the establishment of manufactures." "A thousand mills might be erected with the same ease, and equally accessible, as if on a plain; and each supplied with a never failing water-power." Around 1847, the brothers attempted to interest investors to develop power from the water drop of the falls by developing a "hydraulic raceway" for both power and transportation. Augustus' initial plan was to use the power generated in the 50 foot (15m) drop of the rapids above the falls, however he could not find any interested financiers.

=== Tourism ===
They also worked to develop the falls as a tourist attraction and in 1816, they purchased Goat Island from New York State. Working with engineer and hotel operator Gen. Parkhurst Whitney, they developed the first bridge from the mainland to Goat Island in 1818, the first staircase from Prospect Point to the base of the Falls in that same year, a ferry service across the river in 1820, and a whole series of gardens, walks, bridges, staircases, and other attractions, creating a picturesque and romanticized human garden, all mapped out, from which tourists could explore the spectacular natural beauty of the Falls in a semi-controlled environment.

=== Business ===
Between 1818 and 1822, Porter had a general store in Niagara, New York where he sold food, clothing, leather goods, candles, hardware, grain, lumber and liquors. In addition to the property they owned, businesses they started, and Niagara Falls water rights, they also owned several boats that traveled on the Great Lakes. In 1807, the Porters formed Porter, Barton, and Company to conduct a forwarding business from Oswego to the upper Great Lakes via the Portage Road around the Falls. As part of Porter, Barton, and Company, they established ports in Niagara Falls, Lewiston, and Black Rock.

=== Political office ===
Preceded in the position by his brother, Porter was elected as a Democratic-Republican to the position of Assemblyman for the Genesee and Ontario district during the twenty-sixth session of the New York Assembly from July 1, 1802 – June 30, 1803. Porter later served as the first Judge in Niagara County and the first Postmaster of Niagara Falls.

== Personal life ==
On March 10, 1796, Porter was married to Lavinia Steele. Together, they were the parents of one son:

- Augustus Seymour Porter (1798–1872), who married Sarah G. Barnard.

After the death of his first wife, Porter married Jane Howell (1779–1841) on January 24, 1801. Together, they were the parents of five more children:

- Albert Howell Porter (1801–1888), who married Julia Mathews (1808–1899), a descendant of David Mathews.
- Peter Buell Porter Jr. (1806–1871), who did not marry
- Lavinia E. Porter (1810–1863)
- Baby Porter, who died in infancy.
- Jane S. Porter (born 1816).

Augustus built a house in Niagara Falls in 1808. After the British burned it in 1813, he rebuilt it on the same site in 1818. The Porter family home was demolished in the 1920s. The First Presbyterian Manse was built by or for his daughter Lavinia. It was listed on the National Register of Historic Places in 2012.

Porter died on June 10, 1849 (age 80 years, 4 years, and 21 days), in Niagara Falls, New York. He is interred at Oakwood Cemetery, Niagara Falls, Niagara County, New York.

=== Slavery ===
Porter and his family owned people in slavery. He reputedly brought the first African American family to Niagara Falls, Harry and Kate Wood. The 1800 census noted that one enslaved person lived in the household of Augustus Porter in Canandaigua, New York. In the 1820 census, the Wood family and the Abraham Thompson family, all free people of color, lived near the Porter family.

New York State Assembly
Preceded by Peter Buell Porter	Member of the New York Assembly for Genesee and Ontario District; 1802—1803	Succeeded by Nathaniel W. Howell
