= 1819–1820 United States Senate election in New York =

The 1819/1820 United States Senate election in New York was held on February 2, 1819, and January 8, 1820, by the New York State Legislature to elect a U.S. senator (Class 3) to represent the State of New York in the United States Senate.

== Background ==
Federalist Rufus King had been elected in 1813 to this seat, and his term would expire on March 3, 1819.

At the State election in April 1818, a Democratic-Republican majority was elected to the assembly, and all of the eight state senators up for renewal were Democratic-Republicans. The 42nd New York State Legislature met from January 5 to April 3, 1819, at Albany, New York. The Democratic-Republican Party was split in two factions: the "Clintonians" (allies of Governor DeWitt Clinton), and the "Bucktails" (a combine of the Tammany members from New York City and the upstate adversaries of Clinton led by Attorney General and State Senator Martin Van Buren).

The strength of the factions in the assembly is shown by the difficult proceedings to elect a Speaker: At the Democratic-Republican caucus on the eve of the opening of the Assembly session, January 4, there were 75 members present. All the Bucktail members attended, having been secretly informed of the plan to elect a Bucktail Speaker, but 10 to 15 Clintonians had not arrived yet. 42 voted for Bucktail William Thompson, of Seneca Co.; and 33 for Clintonian Obadiah German. The Clintonians refused to "make the choice unanimous." On January 5, the assembly convened and took four ballots for Speaker, no candidate receiving a majority, and then adjourned. On January 6, a fifth ballot was taken. The vote stood 55 for German, 38 for Thompson, and 20 for Federalist William A. Duer. Seeing that by vote for candidates no choice could be made, Erastus Root offered a resolution that William Thompson be declared elected Speaker which was rejected by 73 to 41. Another resolution in favor of William A. Duer was rejected by 84 to 31. A resolution was then offered to declare Obadiah German elected which was carried by 67 to 48. Thus German was chosen Speaker, evidently with the votes of the Federalists.

== Candidates ==
Some days before the date set for the election, the Democratic-Republican assemblymen and senators met in caucus to nominate a candidate, but the meeting broke up soon after the Bucktails attacked severely both the personal character and political stance of Governor Clinton and Speaker German because of their non-adherence to the caucus nominee for Speaker. This was the last time the Clintonians and the Bucktails caucused together. Henceforth, although nominally in the same party, they appeared as political opponents, and mostly ran separate tickets at elections. Eventually this situation led to a re-alignment of party lines during the 1820s when the Second Party System emerged, with the Bucktails becoming the Jacksonians and later Democrats.

A few days later, the Clintonian State legislators met in caucus and nominated unanimously Congressman John C. Spencer, the son of the leader of the Clintonians, New York Supreme Court Justice Ambrose Spencer.

Canal Commissioner and State Senator Samuel Young was the Bucktails candidate.

The incumbent Federalist U.S. Senator Rufus King ran for re-election.

Secretary of State of New York John Van Ness Yates received one vote, cast by Samuel Young; traditionally a candidate did not vote for himself.

== Result 1819, no choice ==
On February 2, 1819, the state legislature attempted to elect a U.S. Senator. No candidate received a majority in the Senate. Samuel Young had 13 votes out of 28 cast. A resolution was offered to declare Spencer nominated, but was rejected by 17 to 10. A resolution in favor of Young was rejected by 14 to 13; one for Rufus King by 22 to 5; and the Senate adjourned. No candidate received a majority in the Assembly either. John C. Spencer had 51 votes out of 122 cast. Ezekiel Bacon offered a resolution to declare Spencer nominated, which was rejected by 72 to 54. Erastus Root offered a resolution to declare Young nominated, which was rejected by 82 to 44. Thomas J. Oakley offered a resolution to declare King nominated which was rejected by 90 to 34. Erastus Root then offered a resolution in favor of Philetus Swift, and Oakley moved to amend the resolution by striking out Swift's name, which was carried. Oakley then offered to insert the name of John Wells, of New York City, which was rejected by 96 to 29, and the Assembly adjourned too. The state legislature took no more action in this matter, and the Class 3 seat in the U.S. Senate became vacant on March 4, 1819.

1819 United States Senator election result
Office	House	Dem.-Rep./Clintonian		Dem.-Rep./Bucktail		Federalist		Dem.-Rep./Bucktail	
U.S. Senator	State Senate (31 members)	John C. Spencer	10	Samuel Young	13	Rufus King	4	John Van Ness Yates	1
U.S. Senator	State Assembly (126 members)	John C. Spencer	51	Samuel Young	43	Rufus King	28		

== Election, 1820 ==
At the State election in April 1819, a Clintonian majority was elected to the assembly, and five of the nine state senators up for renewal were Clintonians. Most of the Federalist Party had joined the Clintonians by now. The 43rd New York State Legislature met from January 4 to April 14, 1820, at Albany.

The strength of the factions in the assembly was shown by the vote for Speaker: 64 for Clintonian John C. Spencer and 50 for Bucktail Peter Sharpe, 4 for George Huntington and 1 for George Tibbits.

In December 1819, the Bucktails circulated a pamphlet, written by Martin Van Buren and William L. Marcy, among the state legislators, now advocating the re-election of Federalist Rufus King. It was assumed that this was a move to get a large part of the disbanding Federalist Party to vote for the Bucktails' candidate for governor in 1820, to oust the incumbent governor DeWitt Clinton. (see Hammond, page 516)

Thus, with the support of the Clintonians, the Bucktails and the few remaining Federalists, on January 8, 1820, the state legislature re-elected Rufus King unanimously. King took his seat on January 25, 1820, and remained in office until March 3, 1825.

== Sources ==
- The New York Civil List compiled in 1858 (see: pg. 63 for U.S. Senators; pg. 123 for state senators 1818–19; pg. 194f for Members of Assembly 1818–19; pg. 124 for state senators 1819–20; pg. 195f for Members of Assembly 1819–20;)
- Members of the 16th United States Congress (omits date when King took his seat in 1820)
- History of Political Parties in the State of New-York by Jabez Delano Hammond (Speaker election, 1819: pg. 479ff; U.S. Senate election 1819: pg. 482ff [Hammond gives Spencer 54, Young 44, and King 34 in the Assembly, adding up to 132, but there were only 126 members. He mistook the affirmative votes on the resolutions, which were later offered, for the vote for the candidates.]; U.S. Senate election, 1820: pg. 514ff)
- Election result (Speaker 5th ballot and resolutions) at Tufts University Library project "A New Nation Votes"
- Election result (U.S. Senator, 1819) at Tufts University Library project "A New Nation Votes"
- Election result (Speaker, 1820) at Tufts University Library project "A New Nation Votes"
