= Augustus Seymour Porter =

American politician

Augustus S. Porter
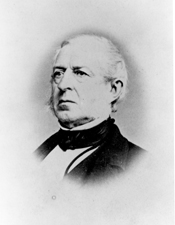

United States Senator from Michigan
- In office January 20, 1840 – March 3, 1845
- Preceded by: Lucius Lyon
- Succeeded by: Lewis Cass

14th Mayor of Detroit
- In office 1838 – March 14, 1839
- Preceded by: Henry Howard
- Succeeded by: Asher B. Bates

Personal details
- Born: January 18, 1798 Canandaigua, New York
- Died: September 18, 1872 (aged 74) Niagara Falls, New York
- Party: Whig
- Spouses: Sarah A. Mansfield (m. 1822; died 1824) Sarah G. Barnard (m. 1832)
- Children: 3
- Parent(s): Augustus Porter; Lavinia Steele
- Relatives: Peter Porter, Jr. (half-brother); Peter Buell Porter (uncle); Peter A. Porter (cousin)
- Education: Canandaigua Academy
- Alma mater: Union College
- Profession: Lawyer

Augustus Seymour Porter (January 18, 1798 – September 18, 1872) was a U.S. statesman from the state of Michigan.

== Early life ==
He was born in Canandaigua, New York, the son of Augustus Porter (1769–1849) and his first wife, Lavinia Steele. His brothers were Albert Howell Porter (1801-1888) and Peter Buell Porter, Jr. (1806–1871), and his uncle was Peter Buell Porter (1773–1844), the United States Secretary of War under John Quincy Adams.

He attended Canandaigua Academy, and graduated from Union College, in Schenectady, New York, in 1818, studied law and was admitted to the bar and commenced practice in Detroit, Michigan.

== Career ==
Porter became the recorder of Detroit in 1830 and was the treasurer of the Michigan Pioneer Society in 1837. He was elected mayor of Detroit in 1838, resigning in 1839 to run for the United States Senate, and was succeeded as mayor by Asher B. Bates on March 14, 1839.

He was elected as a Whig to the United States Senate, and served from January 20, 1840, until March 3, 1845. He did not run for reelection in 1844. He was chairman of the Committee on Roads and Canals, 1841–1845, and was on the Committee on Enrolled Bills, 1841–1843.

== Personal life ==
On July 25, 1822, he married Sarah A. Mansfield (d. 1824). Mansfield died a few months after the birth of Porter's only son:

- Samuel M. Porter (b. 1824), who died in youth.

On September 24, 1832, he married his second wife, Sarah G. Barnard (1807–1885), his cousin and the daughter of Robert Foster Barnard (1784–1850) and Augusta Porter (1786–1833). Sarah was the sister of Frederick Augustus Porter Barnard (1809–1889), a Columbia University President, and Gen. John G. Barnard (1815–1882). She was also a niece of Senator Henry Clay (1777–1852). Together, they had:

- Jane A. Porter (b. 1833)
- Sarah Frederica Porter (b. 1836), who married Stephen E. Burrall (1826–1868), in 1863, and who lived in London in 1885.

In 1848, he moved to his father's residence, in Niagara Falls, New York, and died there on September 18, 1872. He is interred in Oakwood Cemetery in Niagara Falls, New York. Sarah died at Newport, Isle of Wight on April 30, 1885.

=== Descendants ===
Through his youngest daughter, he was the grandfather of Guy Augustus Porter–Burrall (1865–1890), a Cambridge University lawyer and Lieutenant in the British Army, and Stephen E. Porter–Burrall (1868–1896), an 1883 Eton College graduate. The family assumed the name of Porter–Burrall, by letters patent from Queen Victoria, on August 16, 1886.

U.S. Senate
Preceded by Lucius Lyon	U.S. senator (Class 1) from Michigan; January 20, 1840 – March 3, 1845; Served alongside: John Norvell, William Woodbridge	Succeeded by Lewis Cass
