= Samuel Young (New York politician) =

American politician

19th Secretary of State of New York
- In office February 7, 1842 – February 8, 1845
- Governor: William H. Seward; William C. Bouck; Silas Wright
- Preceded by: Archibald Campbell
- Succeeded by: Nathaniel S. Benton

Samuel Young (1779, Lenox, Berkshire County, Massachusetts – November 3, 1850 Ballston, Saratoga County, New York) was an American lawyer and politician.

== Life ==
In 1813, he was Moderator of the Board of Supervisors of Saratoga County.

He was a member of the New York State Assembly (Saratoga Co.) in 1814 and 1814–15; and was Speaker in 1814–15.

From 1816 to 1840, he was a member of the Erie Canal Commission.

He was a member of the New York State Senate (Eastern D.) from 1818 to 1821, sitting in the 41st, 42nd, 43rd and 44th New York State Legislatures. In 1819, he was the Bucktails candidate for U.S. Senator from New York, but due to a three-cornered contest with Clintonian John C. Spencer and Federalist Rufus King, no-one was elected. Young was a delegate to the New York State Constitutional Convention of 1821.

In 1824 he was the Bucktails candidate for Governor of New York, but lost to DeWitt Clinton. He was again a member of the State Assembly (Saratoga Co.) in 1826, and was Speaker. From 1833 to 1838, he was First Judge of the Saratoga County Court.

He was again a member of the State Senate (4th D.) from 1835 to 1836, sitting in the 58th and 59th New York State Legislatures. He issued a concurring opinion in Coster v. Lorillard that was remarkable for its attack on the common law. He resigned his seat on May 22, 1836. In November of the same year he was re-elected to the State Senate and served from 1837 to 1840, sitting in the 60th, 61st, 62nd and 63rd New York State Legislatures.

He was Secretary of State of New York from 1842 to 1845. He was again a member of the State Senate (4th D.) from 1846 to 1847, sitting in the 69th and 70th New York State Legislatures.

Young was a follower of Van Buren. At the 1844 Democratic National Convention, he was the sole vote of New York not to be cast for James K. Polk on the unofficial 9th ballot. He was Chairman of the Barnburners state convention which met on June 22, 1848, at Utica, New York and nominated Martin Van Buren for U.S. President. He was a Democrat.

He was buried at Briggs Cemetery in Ballston Spa, New York.

== Sources ==
- Political Graveyard
- Jabez Delano Hammond: The History of Political Parties in the State of New York (Baltimore, 1850)
- History of Saratoga County by Nathaniel Bartlett Sylvester (1878)
- The New York Civil List compiled by Franklin Benjamin Hough (pages 33, 42, 131, 147, 318 and 364; Weed, Parsons and Co., 1858)

Party political offices
Vacant Title last held by Daniel D. Tompkins	Bucktails nominee for Governor of New York; 1824	Succeeded by William B. Rochester
Political offices
Preceded by James Emott	Speaker of the New York State Assembly; 1814–1815	Succeeded by Daniel Cruger
Preceded by Clarkson Crolius	Speaker of the New York State Assembly; 1826	Succeeded by Erastus Root
New York State Senate
Preceded by Louis Hasbrouck	New York State Senate; Fourth District (Class 2); 1835–1840	Succeeded by John W. Taylor
Political offices
Preceded by Archibald Campbell; Acting	Secretary of State of New York; 1842–1845	Succeeded by Nathaniel S. Benton
New York State Senate
Preceded by Edmund Varney	New York State Senate; Fourth District (Class 3); 1846–1847	Succeeded by district abolished
