= Archibald S. Clarke =

American politician (1788-1821)

Member of the House of Representatives from New York's 21st District
- In office December 2, 1816 – March 3, 1817
- Preceded by: Peter B. Porter; Micah Brooks
- Succeeded by: Benjamin Ellicott; John C. Spencer

Personal details
- Born: 1788 Prince George's County, Maryland, US
- Died: December 4, 1821 (aged 32–33) Clarence, New York, US
- Party: Democratic-Republican
- Occupation: lawyer

Archibald Smith Clarke (1788 – December 4, 1821) was a U.S. representative from New York, brother of Staley Nichols Clarke.

Born on a plantation in Prince George's County, Maryland, Clarke attended grammar and high schools. He studied law, was admitted to the bar and practiced in Niagara County, New York. He served as surrogate of Niagara County in 1808 and 1809. He was a member of the New York State Assembly from 1809 to 1811, and served in the New York State Senate 1813–1816. He also served as Niagara County clerk in 1815 and 1816.

Clarke was elected as a Democratic-Republican to the Fourteenth Congress to fill the vacancy caused by the resignation of Peter B. Porter and served from December 2, 1816, to March 3, 1817. He died in Clarence, New York, December 4, 1821.

Archibald S. Clarke was the brother of Staley N. Clarke, who also served in Congress.

U.S. House of Representatives
Preceded by Peter B. Porter, Micah Brooks	Member of the U.S. House of Representatives from New York's 21st congressional district 1816–1817 with Micah Brooks	Succeeded by Benjamin Ellicott, John C. Spencer
