= John Ferguson (New York politician) =

American politician

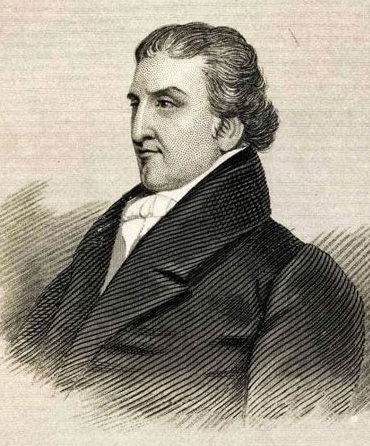
- From Manual of the Corporation of the City of New York for 1864, by D. T. Valentine.

53rd Mayor of New York City
- In office March 6, 1815 – July 9, 1815
- Preceded by: DeWitt Clinton
- Succeeded by: Jacob Radcliff

Naval Officer of the Port of New York
- In office 1813–1832
- Preceded by: Samuel Osgood
- Succeeded by: Enos T. Throop

Personal details
- Born: c. 1777 New York City, New York, U.S.
- Died: September 5, 1832 (aged 54–55) New York City, New York, U.S.
- Party: Democratic-Republican; Democratic
- Education: Columbia College
- Profession: Attorney

John Ferguson (c. 1777—September 5, 1832) was an American attorney and politician from New York City. A Democratic-Republican, and later a Democrat, he was most notable for his service as the 53rd Mayor of New York City from March to June 1815, Grand Sachem of Tammany Hall, and Naval Officer of the Port of New York.

== Biography ==
Ferguson was born c. 1777.

Ferguson graduated from Columbia University in 1795, studied law, and became an attorney. He was active in politics as a Democratic-Republican, and became a political opponent of Dewitt Clinton.

He worked his way through the ranks to become leader, or Grand Sachem, of Tammany Hall. In 1813, he was appointed Naval Officer of the Port of New York, a lucrative federal position, in which he served until his death.

In March, 1815 he was appointed mayor of New York City. President James Monroe requested that Ferguson choose which office he preferred to hold, and resign the other. Ferguson resigned as mayor in June 1815, enabling Jacob Radcliff to become mayor. From 1830 to 1832, Ferguson was a trustee of Columbia College.

Ferguson died in New York City on September 5, 1832.

== Family ==
Ferguson's daughter Louisa (1807-1845) was the wife of Robert Walter Weir. He was the grandfather of John Ferguson Weir, son of Robert and Louisa (Ferguson) Weir.
