= 1817 New York gubernatorial election =

- April/May, 1817
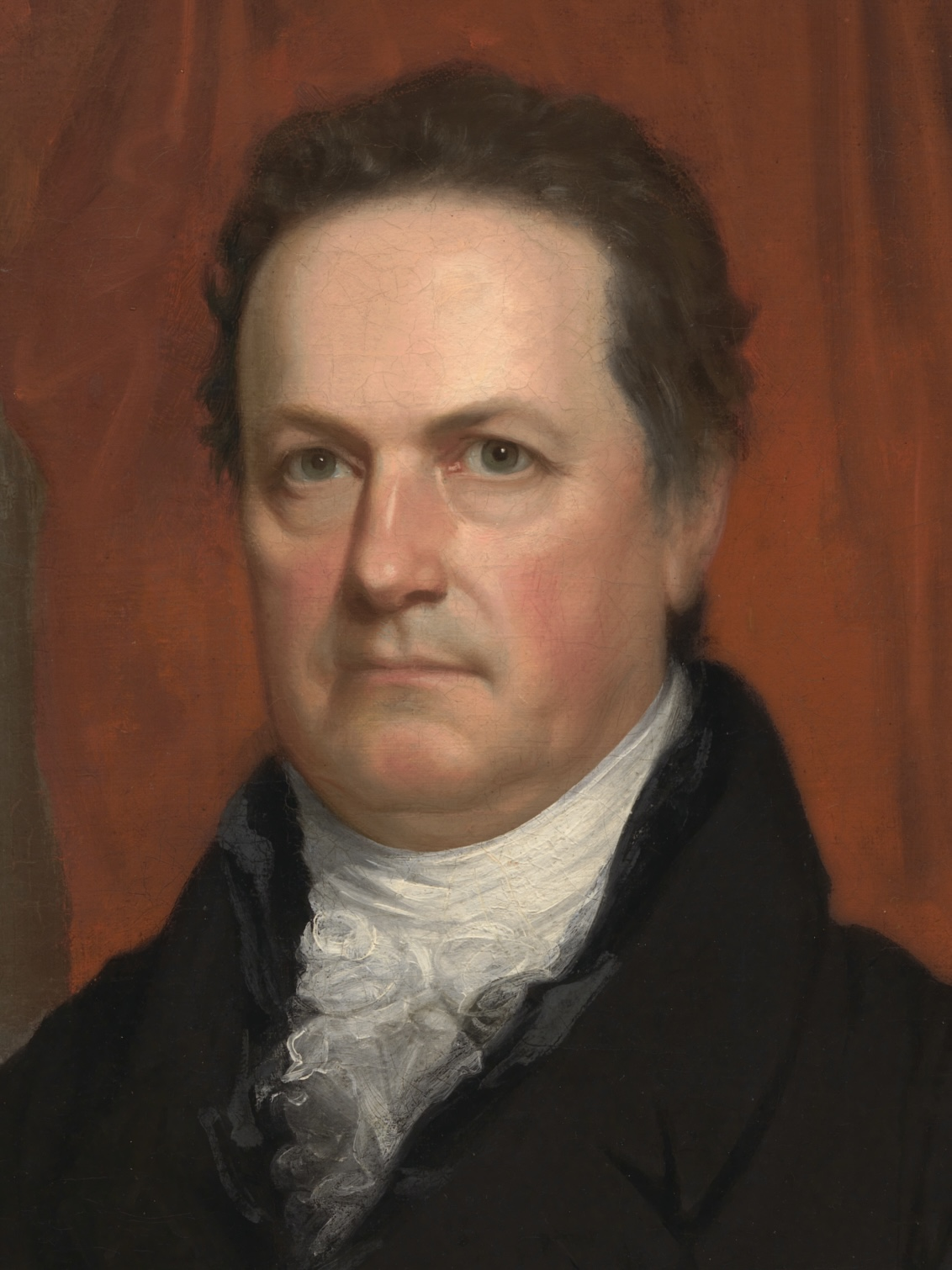
Nominee	DeWitt Clinton
Party	Democratic-Republican
Popular vote	43,310
Percentage	96.83%
- County results Clinton: 60–70% 70–80% 80–90% 90–100%
Governor before election
John Tayler (Acting)
Democratic-Republican
Elected Governor
DeWitt Clinton
Democratic-Republican

The 1817 New York gubernatorial election was held in April/May 1817 to elect the Governor and Lieutenant Governor of New York. It was the last election until 1876 where the winner was elected to a 3 year term as governor as subsequent elections between 1820 and 1874 reduced the Governor's term to 2 years.

== History ==
Governor Daniel D. Tompkins was elected Vice President of the United States in November 1816; he resigned in February 1817. Article XVII of the New York State Constitution of 1777 said that "...as often as the seat of government shall become vacant, a wise and descreet freeholder of this State shall be, by ballot, elected governor,..., which elections shall be always held at the times and places of choosing representatives in assembly..." This meant that, whenever a vacancy occurred, the Lieutenant Governor did not succeed to the governor's office but administrated the state only until the end of the yearly term of the New York State Assembly on June 30, the successor being elected in April.

== Candidates ==
The Democratic-Republican Party nominated former Lieutenant Governor DeWitt Clinton. They nominated acting Governor John Tayler for Lieutenant Governor.

Though he did not run, the Tammany organization, which opposed Clinton, distributed ballots in New York City with the name of former Secretary of State of New York Peter Buell Porter, and a few were cast.

== Results ==
The Democratic-Republican ticket of Clinton and Tayler was elected.

1817 New York Gubernatorial Election
Party	Candidate	Votes	%
Democratic-Republican	DeWitt Clinton	43,310	96.83%
Tammany Hall	Peter Buell Porter	1,417	3.17%
Total votes		44,727	100%

== See also ==
- New York gubernatorial elections
- New York state elections

== Sources ==
Result: The Tribune Almanac 1841
