= Jacob Radcliff =

American politician

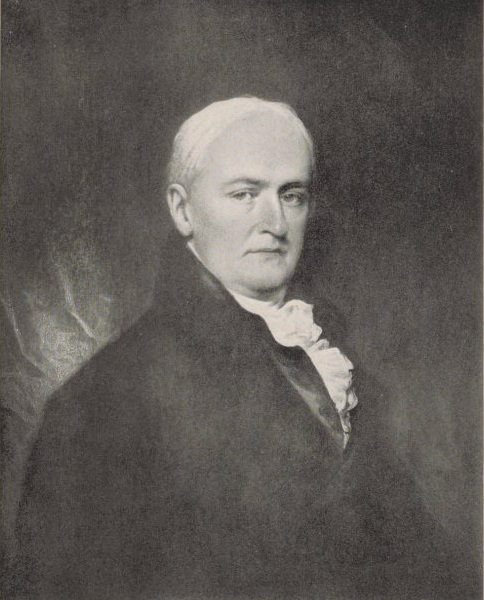

51st and 54th Mayor of New York City
- In office July 10, 1815 – 1818
- Preceded by: John Ferguson
- Succeeded by: Cadwallader D. Colden
- In office February 13, 1810 – 1811
- Preceded by: DeWitt Clinton
- Succeeded by: DeWitt Clinton

Personal details
- Born: April 20, 1764 Rhinebeck, Province of New York, British America
- Died: May 6, 1844 (aged 80) Troy, New York, U.S.
- Party: Federalist
- Spouse: Juliana Smith
- Education: Princeton University
- Occupation: Lawyer, politician

Jacob Radcliff or Radclift (April 20, 1764 – May 6, 1844) was a jurist, lawyer and politician.

He served as Mayor of New York City from 1810 to 1811, and from 1815 to 1818.

== Early life and education ==
He was born on April 20, 1764, in Rhinebeck, New York.

Radcliff graduated from Princeton University in 1783.

== Career and marriage ==
Radcliff practiced law under Egbert Benson, the first New York Attorney General. He was admitted to the bar in 1786.

About the same time, he married Juliana Smith, the daughter of Cotton Mather Smith and descendent of Richard Mather.

While practicing law in Poughkeepsie, New York, he was a member of the New York State Assembly (Dutchess County) in the 1795 18th New York State Legislature and was one of the twelve members of the Joint Committee on Elections of the Senate and Assembly of New York.

He was appointed Assistant Attorney General on February 23, 1796.

On December 27, 1798, he became a justice of the New York Supreme Court. In this position, he helped revise the state's laws. He resigned from the bench in 1804, and practiced chancery law in Brooklyn.

When the Federalist Party gained the majority in 1810, Radcliff was appointed mayor of New York City. When the War of 1812 divided the Federalist party, Radcliff aligned with the Tammany Society, which was poised to gain a majority in state politics. Grand Sachem of Tammany Hall John Ferguson became mayor in 1815 but resigned to take the appointment of Surveyor of the Port of New York. Radcliff was chosen as his replacement.

== Death ==
He died in Troy, New York, on May 6, 1844.

Preceded by DeWitt Clinton	Mayor of New York; 1810–1811	Succeeded by DeWitt Clinton
Preceded by John Ferguson	Mayor of New York; 1815–1818	Succeeded by Cadwallader D. Colden
