= Archibald Campbell (New York politician) =

American politician (1779–1856)

Archibald Campbell (1779 Glen Lyon, Perthshire, Scotland - July 14, 1856 Albany, New York) was an American politician who was Acting Secretary of State of New York from 1841 to 1842.

== Life ==
He came to the United States in 1798, and settled at Albany, NY, where he worked for the printers Barber & Southwick.

In 1805, Secretary of State Thomas Tillotson hired Campbell as a clerk, and in 1812, Secretary of State Elisha Jenkins appointed him Deputy Secretary. He remained in office until 1849, was reappointed in 1852 but resigned because of ill health in 1853. He served under 13 different Secretaries of State from the Democratic-Republican, Federalist, Democratic and Whig Parties.

In October 1841, after the resignation of John Canfield Spencer, who had been appointed U.S. Secretary of War, Campbell became Acting Secretary of State of New York for the remainder of Spencer's term, and resumed his post of Deputy Secretary under Samuel Young who was elected by the New York State Legislature in February 1842.

Political offices
| Preceded by John Canfield Spencer | Secretary of State of New York; Acting; 1841 - 1842 | Succeeded by Samuel Young |
