= Asher B. Bates =

American judge and politician

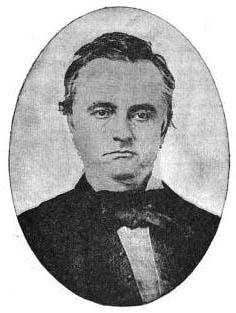
- Born: May 2, 1810; Genesee County, New York
- Died: June 1, 1873 (aged 63); San Francisco
- Occupation: Lawyer
- Spouse: Elizabeth Gertrude Judd
- Parent(s): Asher Bates ? Steel

Asher B. Bates (May 2, 1810 – June 1, 1873) was a lawyer and politician in the United States state of Michigan and in the Kingdom of Hawaii.

== Life ==
His father was also named Asher Bates, so he is sometimes called Asher Bates Jr.

Bates was born May 2, 1810, in Le Roy, Genesee County, New York. He graduated from Union College in 1828 and came to Detroit, Michigan, in 1831, where he was an attorney, Justice of the Peace, City Attorney, and City Recorder. In 1838, he served as Mayor of Detroit after the resignation of Augustus S. Porter to run for the U.S. Senate. He was also an agent for the Protection Insurance Company of Hartford. He married Lucilla Beals October 23, 1832, but she died in 1839.

He established the practice of Farnsworth & Bates with Elon Farnsworth. They were joined by Henry N. Walker in 1836, who had studied law in their office. In 1837, Farnsworth left the firm to become chancellor of the chancery court of Michigan and with the addition of Samuel T. Douglass, the firm became Bates, Walker & Douglass. The firm of Walker & Douglass continued after Bates' departure for several years until they were joined by James V. Campbell. Both Campbell and Douglass served terms on the Michigan Supreme Court and both Farnsworth and Walker served as Michigan Attorney General.

He married Elizabeth Gertrude (or Gilmore) Judd (1810–?) December 6, 1843. At some point he moved from Detroit to Jackson County, Michigan, where he ran unsuccessfully as a Whig Party candidate for Justice of Probate in 1844.

By July 1848 he had emigrated to the Hawaiian Islands and became a citizen of the Kingdom of Hawaii. Bates was brother-in-law of Gerrit P. Judd, a former American missionary doctor who was then a power cabinet minister. He served from August 21, 1849, to 1853 on the Privy Council of King Kamehameha III. On November 1, 1849, he became Registrar of Conveyances until August 3, 1859. Although the office of Attorney General was not officially part of the cabinet since the resignation of flamboyant but short-lived John Ricord, Bates served as lawyer for the king. Ricord had help design the executive branch and served as combined Attorney General and Registrar, or chief Notary Public. Bates was succeeded by Thomas Brown who served until 1886.

He moved to San Francisco in 1863 to become a bankruptcy judge and died on June 1, 1873. of leprosy contracted while in Hawaii.
