= Joseph Gardner Swift =

American soldier (1783–1865)

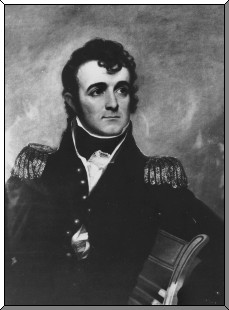
- Colonel Joseph Gardner Swift
- Born: December 31, 1783; Nantucket, Massachusetts
- Died: July 23, 1865 (aged 81); Geneva, New York, U.S.
- Burial place: Washington Street Cemetery
- Spouse: Louisa Margaret Walker (m. 1805; died 1855)
- Military career
- Allegiance: United States of America
- Branch: United States Army
- Service years: 1802–1818
- Rank: Colonel; Brevet brigadier general
- Commands: Construction of Cape Fear River defenses Fort Johnson, North Carolina; Superintendent of the United States Military Academy; Eastern Department Defenses; Chief Engineer of the US Army
- Conflicts: War of 1812; Battle of Crysler's Farm; St. Lawrence Campaign

Joseph Gardner Swift (December 31, 1783 – July 23, 1865) was an American soldier who, in 1802, became the first graduate of the newly instituted United States Military Academy in West Point, New York; he would later serve as its third superintendent from 1812 to 1814, and as chief of engineers of the United States Army from 1812 to 1818. In 1814, Swift was elected as member of the American Philosophical Society.

== Early life and education ==
Swift was born on Nantucket Island, the son of Foster Swift and his wife, Deborah. At the age of six, he saw George Washington on Boston Common, an experience that made an indelible impression on him. In 1792, the Swifts moved to Taunton, Massachusetts, where Joseph became the student of Reverend Simeon Doggett, who prepared him to enter Harvard College. Swift had read accounts of the American Revolution in his father’s diary and heard stories from a family friend, Major General David Cobb. With Cobb’s advice and assistance, Swift was appointed by President John Adams on May 12, 1800, as a cadet of artillerists and engineers. He reported for duty a month later at Newport Harbor.

Later, in the summer of 1801, Secretary of War Henry Dearborn notified the army that President Thomas Jefferson had directed the establishment of a military academy at West Point, New York. Swift reported as a cadet to the academy on October 14, 1801. On December 15, 1801, then-Major Jonathan Williams took command and several months later became the first superintendent of the U.S. Military Academy. The academy was established by law on March 16, 1802. Swift progressed well and was considered by Williams to be the foremost cadet. After a thorough examination, Swift became the first graduate of the academy on October 12, 1802. Simeon Magruder Levy was the only other graduate in 1802.

== 1802–1814 ==
Swift remained at West Point until April 30, 1804, and in June of that year, became the superintending engineer of the construction of the defenses of the mouth of the Cape Fear River in North Carolina. In January 1805 he became the commander of Fort Johnson, North Carolina.

Swift returned to West Point in 1807 and took command of the academy in Williams' absence. He remained there until November 23 of that year, when the academy was closed for the winter vacation. Swift was promoted to major in February 1808 and assigned to lead the defenses of the Eastern Department covering the New England coast. He was assigned with Joseph Gilbert Totten and Sylvanus Thayer, also graduates of West Point. Once again, Swift was assigned to his old station at the mouth of the Cape Fear River where he was charged with superintending and inspecting southern coast defenses until 1812. In July 1812, Jonathan Williams resigned as chief engineer of the army, and Swift, then a lieutenant colonel and the next senior engineer in the army, assumed his command. His appointment as Colonel and chief engineer of the army was unanimously confirmed in December 1812.

Pending his confirmation, Swift was ordered back to his duties to superintend the defenses of North Carolina. Before leaving Washington, he ordered Captain Alden Partridge, the senior engineer officer at West Point, to open the Military Academy (then practically defunct) in the coming spring. Swift was 30 years old upon becoming chief engineer of the army and superintendent of the United States Military Academy.

In March 1813, Swift was called to Washington and consulted with the Secretary of War on the application of large appropriations for fortification of coastal defenses. He then reported to New York City to supervise the fortifications process, acting in his capacity as the chief engineer and superintendent of the U.S. Military Academy.

As superintendent, Swift made frequent trips to West Point; he initiated plans for a new mess hall, academic building, and South Barracks and was authorized to employ an acting chaplain to be professor of ethics, history, and geography (the first such being Rev. Adam Empie). He remodeled the functions of the academic staff and assumed the duties of inspector of the institution to oversee the authority of the local commander, Captain Partridge.

With the repairs of New York Harbor completed and fortifications against the British fleet in place, Swift requested orders for the field. He became the chief engineer of the Northern Army under Major General James Wilkinson, which took him to the ill-fated St. Lawrence Campaign; here Swift won a citation for gallantry in the battle of Chrysler's Farm. He was breveted a brigadier general on February 19, 1814.

The Secretary of War refused Swift further field service because coastal defenses required attention and sent Swift again to New York where, in conjunction with the Committee of Safety, he established plans for coastal defenses for New York and Brooklyn and supervised thousands of volunteers working on the project. For that effort the Corporation of New York named him Benefactor to the City.

== 1814–1818 ==
After completing the defenses of New York, Swift was called upon to form a new system of infantry tactics, to reduce the army to a peacetime establishment, and later, with Colonel George Bomford, to rebuild the U.S. Capitol in Washington, D.C., which had been destroyed by the British in the War of 1812.

Shortly after the war, Congress authorized the president to employ Brigadier General Simon Bernard of the French Army, a distinguished engineer under Napoleon, as an assistant in the Corps of Engineers. He was placed at the head of the board of engineers while Swift became solely superintendent of the Military Academy. Swift protested the admission of foreigners into the American military, who in the event of war might become enemies. However, Bernard stayed on the board of engineers until 1831.

As superintendent, Swift recommended sending two engineer officers to Europe to examine French and Dutch fortifications and to purchase books to form a library at West Point. It was also hoped that one of them would replace him as superintendent. Swift also secured a loan from Jacob Barker, a rich Quaker merchant, because no government appropriations were available. Swift saved the institution from abandonment when he personally arranged a $65,000 loan at 7% interest.

For some time, Swift remained in local command at West Point, and in January 1817, proceeded to Washington to present his grievances to President James Madison. This resulted in Swift’s resuming his position in Washington at the head of the Corps of Engineers and leaving Bernard without any military control.

Swift accompanied newly elected president James Monroe on his trip to examine the northern states and during the seven-week excursion was able to study the battlefields of the American Revolution and the War of 1812, as well as inspect arsenals, navy yards and fortifications, and study the capacity of the country for defense. He also examined institutions of learning, particularly the Military Academy, in which Monroe was very interested.

At the time of this visit to West Point, it was decided that Partridge would be replaced by then-Major Sylvanus Thayer, who, in 1817, was appointed superintendent of the academy and later became known as "the Father of West Point". The presidential tour continued to Maine, and Swift and a joint board of army and navy officers examined fortifications from Penobscot, Maine, to Connecticut. He also traveled to the Chesapeake Bay area and chose a site for a navy yard at Norfolk, Virginia.

In 1818, just before leaving the military, Swift’s main duties were in Virginia. He studied the northern tributaries of the Chesapeake and made his last inspection of the Military Academy in September 1818. He was engaged with Governeur Kemble and four others in establishing the West Point Foundry at Cold Spring-on-the-Hudson. After contemplating civilian life for more than two years, he submitted his resignation on November 12, 1818, reserving all his rights as a brevet brigadier general in the army, to be called into service in the event of war. He maintained this status until his death.

Soon after he left the army, Swift was asked by the Corps of Engineers to sit for a portrait in his honor. The portrait, painted by Sully, was hung in the library at the academy upon its completion and hangs there today.

== 1818–1832 ==
The day after his resignation, Swift accepted the surveyorship of the Port of New York. As a civil engineer, he soon became involved in various important projects. In 1819, he was consulted on the feasibility of banking and draining the Newark Flats. In 1820 he was appointed by the Legislature of New Jersey to superintend the plan to open the Morris Canal improvement. In 1822 he was one of three Commissioners charged with regulating streets and drainage of the eastern part of the City of New York. In 1825, he was appointed as commissioner to determine the capacity of the Bronx and Croton Rivers to supply New York City with pure water.

Unfortunately for Swift, during this time he decided to venture into business dealings on Wall Street. In 1825, he was elected vice president of a life and trust insurance company. The company failed, and all its members were indicted for conspiracy to defraud the state. Swift was acquitted but suffered the loss of all his property. Without means to support his family, Swift moved to a small farm belonging to his wife in Haywood County, Tennessee, where he built a small cabin and began growing cotton. Finding the title to his plantation defective and his children suffering from the weather, Swift returned to New York and to his career in civil engineering; within the following year took charge of the Baltimore and Susquehanna Railroad in Maryland.

In March 1829, he was appointed superintendent of the harbor improvements on Lake Ontario and held this position for sixteen years. While the lake works were suspended during the winter of 1829, Swift took charge of construction of a new railroad from New Orleans to Lake Pontchartrain that was routed five miles through a dense swamp, which was considered impassable as it could be neither drained nor piled. This was a pioneer railroad of the South, and perhaps the first in America where iron edge rails were used.

In 1832, Swift succeeded Benjamin Wright as chief engineer of the New York and Harlem Railroad, but interference from the board of directors caused him to resign.

== 1832–1865 ==
Swift moved to Geneva, New York, and Hobart College elected him professor of engineering and statistics. Though he declined this honor, he accepted the membership offered to him in the Society of Statistics of Paris, France, and took a great interest in statistical and educational matters. In 1833, Swift was asked to present his views on how far the West Point system of discipline and instruction could be adapted to a university to be established in the City of New York. In 1834, he proposed a plan to Governor William L. Marcy for normal schools and advised the school system to secure the services of Professor Horace Webster as superintendent of the Free Academy, which later became the College of the City of New York.

== Marriage and family ==
Swift married Louisa Margaret Walker, the daughter of James and M.M. Walker, on June 6, 1805, in North Carolina. They had at least six children.

== Death ==
Swift died on July 23, 1865, in Geneva, aged eighty-two, and was buried in Washington Street Cemetery in Geneva next to his wife, who had died in Geneva on November 15, 1855. Six of their children are also buried there:

- Charlotte Swift, born April 5, 1826, died December 31, 1840;
- Julius H. Swift, died February 6, 1850, aged 35;
- Thomas Delano Swift, born Wilmington, November 27, 1812, died Geneva September 1829;
- James Thomas Swift, died July 31, 1890;
- Foster Swift, M.D., born Geneva October 31, 1833, died Santa Cruz, West Indies May 10, 1875;
- Jonathan Williams Swift, Commodore, United States Navy, born Taunton, March 30, 1808, died Geneva July 30, 1877.

Also buried there are three of their daughters-in-law and one of their grandsons.

Military offices
Preceded by Jonathan Williams	Superintendent of the U.S. Military Academy; 1812–1814	Succeeded by Alden Partridge
Preceded by Jonathan Williams	Chief of Engineers; 1812–1818	Succeeded by Walker Keith Armistead
