= Micah Brooks =

American politician

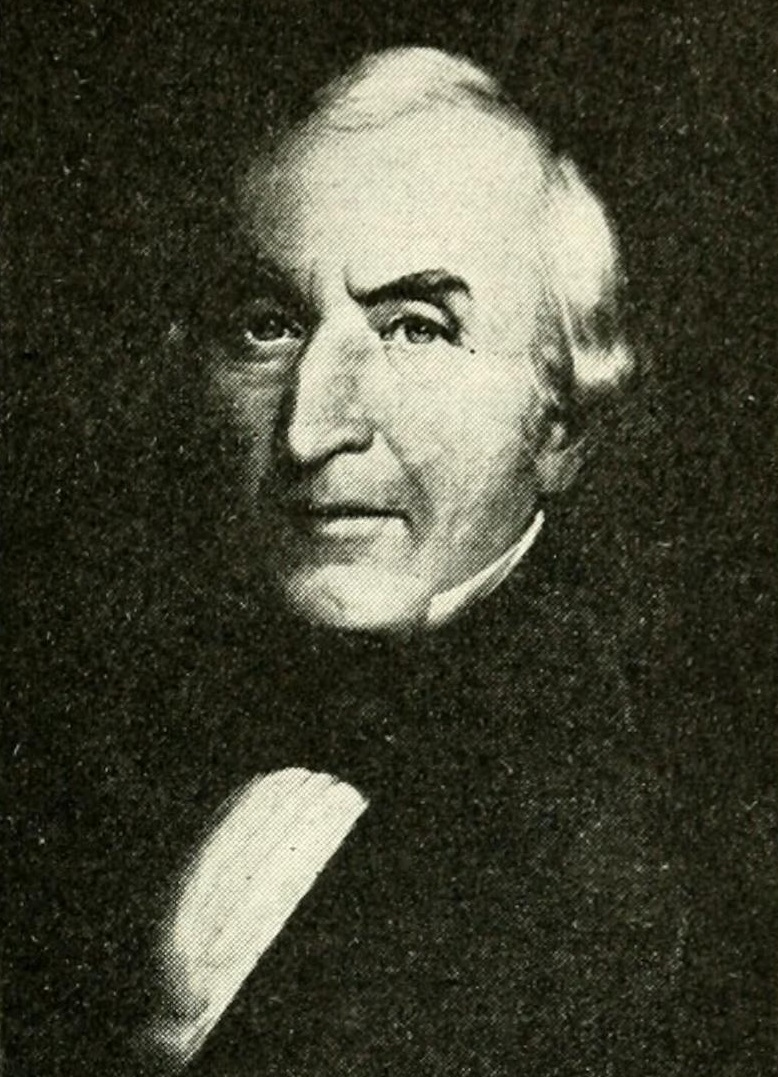

Member of the U.S. House of Representatives from New York's 21st district
- In office March 4, 1815 – March 3, 1817
- Preceded by: Samuel M. Hopkins; Peter Buell Porter
- Succeeded by: Benjamin Ellicott; John Canfield Spencer

New York State Assembly
- In office 1808–1809

Personal details
- Born: May 14, 1775 near Cheshire, Connecticut Colony, British America
- Died: July 7, 1857 (aged 82) Fillmore, New York, U.S.
- Resting place: Nunda Cemetery, Nunda, New York
- Citizenship: U.S.
- Party: Democratic-Republican
- Profession: Surveyor

Military service
- Allegiance: United States
- Branch/service: United States Army; New York, New York State Infantry
- Years of service: 1812-1814; 1828-1830
- Rank: Colonel; Major-general
- Battles/wars: War of 1812

Micah Brooks (May 14, 1775 – July 7, 1857) was a U.S. representative from New York.

== Life ==
Brooks received his early education from his father. He was a pioneer and one of the earliest surveyors of western New York.

He was appointed a Justice of the Peace in 1806. He was a member from Ontario County of the New York State Assembly in 1808–09. He served as colonel on the frontier and at Fort Erie during the War of 1812. He was a major general of the New York State Infantry from 1828 to 1830.

Brooks was elected as a Democratic-Republican to the 14th United States Congress, holding office from March 4, 1815, to March 3, 1817. Afterwards he engaged in agricultural pursuits.

He was a delegate to the New York State Constitutional Convention of 1821. He was elected a presidential elector in 1824 and cast his vote for John Quincy Adams.

He was buried at the Nunda Cemetery in Nunda, New York.

U.S. House of Representatives
Preceded by Samuel M. Hopkins, Nathaniel W. Howell	Member of the U.S. House of Representatives from New York's 21st congressional district 1815–1817 with Peter B. Porter 1815–16 and Archibald S. Clarke 1816–17	Succeeded by Benjamin Ellicott, John C. Spencer
