= 1824 New York gubernatorial election =

- November 1—3, 1824
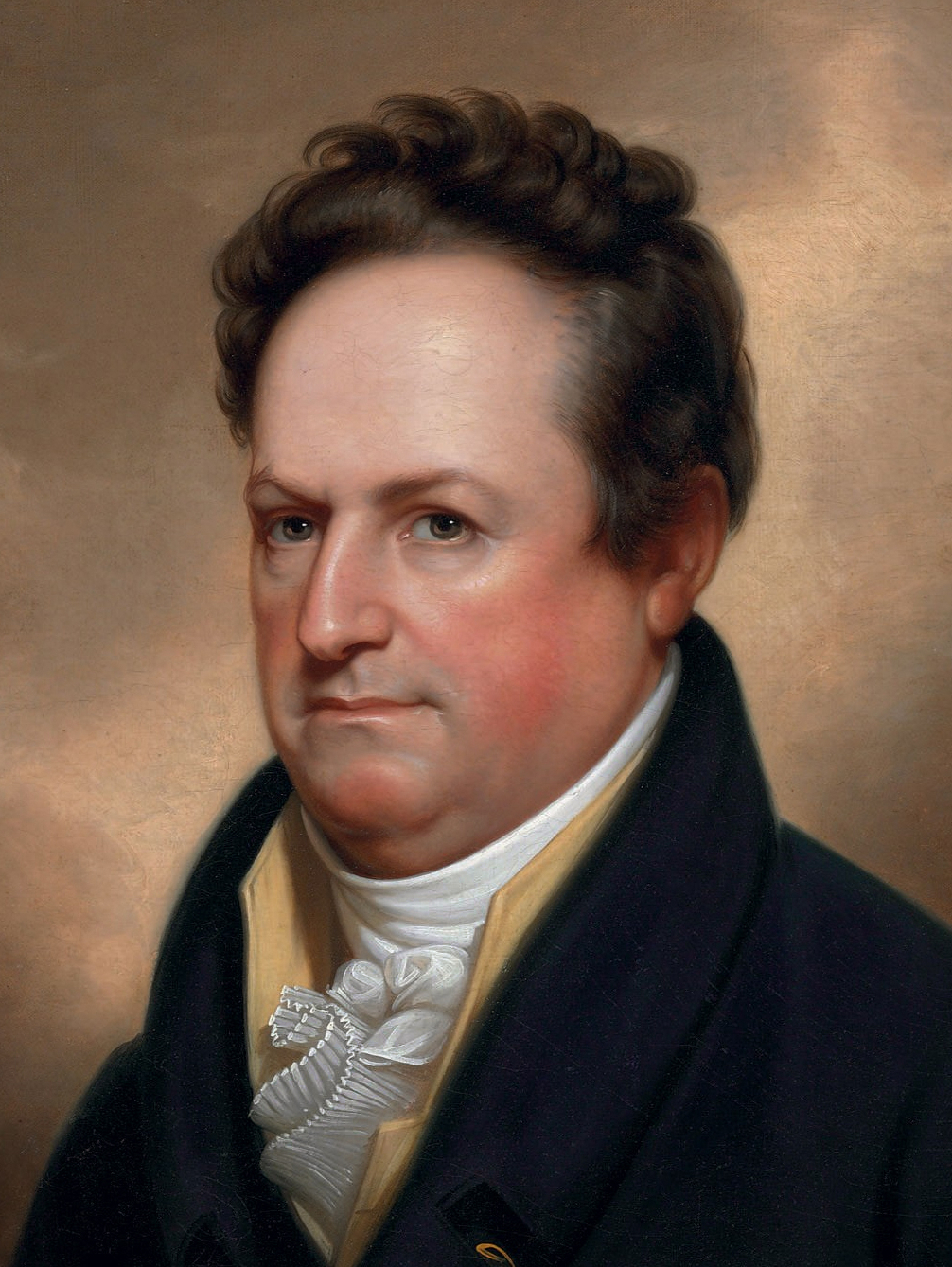

Nominee	DeWitt Clinton	Samuel Young
Party	Democratic-Republican	Democratic-Republican
Alliance	Clintonian	anti-Clintonian
Popular vote	103,452	87,093
Percentage	54.29%	45.71%
- County results Clinton: 50–60% 60–70% 70–80% Young: 50–60% 60–70% 70–80%
Governor before election
Joseph C. Yates
Democratic-Republican
Elected Governor
DeWitt Clinton
Democratic-Republican

The 1824 New York gubernatorial election was held from November 1 to 3, 1824. Former Governor DeWitt Clinton returned to office for a third non-consecutive term, defeating Samuel Young.

== General election ==
=== Candidates ===
- DeWitt Clinton, former Governor of New York, U.S. Senator, and mayor of New York City (Clintonian Republican)
- Samuel Young, member of the Erie Canal Commission (anti-Clintonian Republican)

The Clintonian faction of the Democratic-Republican Party nominated former Governor DeWitt Clinton. The anti-Clintonian faction nominated Erie Canal Commissioner Samuel Young.

=== Results ===
The Clintonian ticket of Clinton and Tallmadge won.

1824 New York gubernatorial election
Party	Candidate	Votes	%
Democratic-Republican (Clintonian)	DeWitt Clinton	103,452	54.29%
Democratic-Republican (anti-Clintonian)	Samuel Young	87,093	45.71%
Total votes		190,545	100%

== Sources ==
Result: The Tribune Almanac 1841
