= First Presbyterian Manse (Niagara Falls, New York) =

Historic house in New York, United States

- U.S. National Register of Historic Places
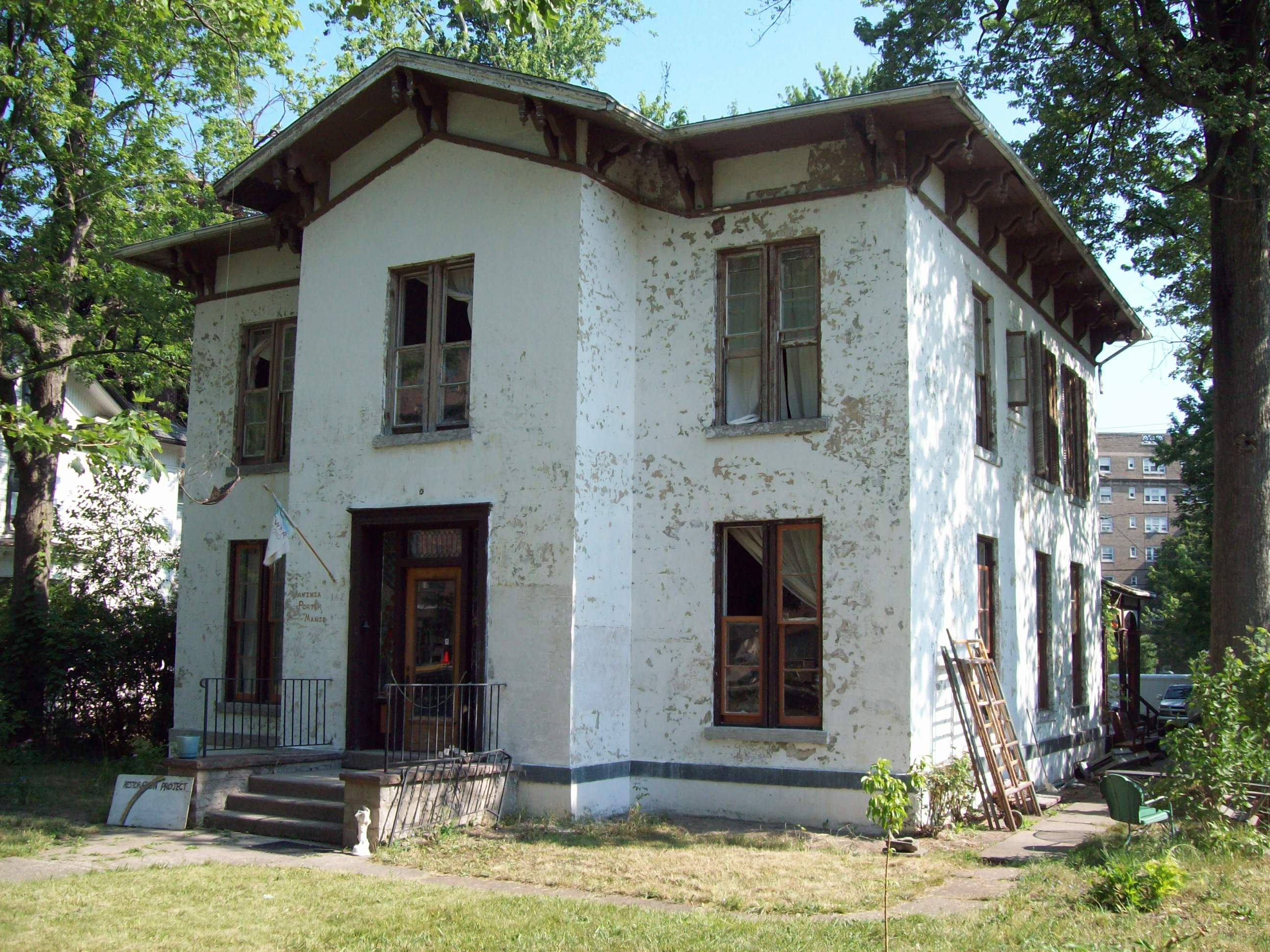
- First Presbyterian Manse, July 2012

- Location within New York Location within the United States
- Location: 162 Buffalo Ave., Niagara Falls, New York
- Coordinates: 43°04′59″N 79°03′36″W
- Area: less than one acre
- Built: c. 1849
- Architectural style: Italianate
- NRHP reference No.: 12000367
- Added to NRHP: June 27, 2012

First Presbyterian Manse, also known as the Lavinia E. Porter House, is a historic home located at Niagara Falls in Niagara County, New York. It was built about 1849 and is a two-story, stucco covered, square brick dwelling in the Italianate style. It has a projecting full-height entrance and a rear addition. It has a low pitched gable roof with deep overhanging eaves and decorative brackets. The house was last renovated in 1927–1931. The home is associated with Lavinia E. Porter, daughter of Judge Augustus Porter (1769–1849). From its construction, it housed the manse for the local Presbyterian church.

It was listed on the National Register of Historic Places in 2012.
