= Washington Street Cemetery =

Historic cemetery in Ontario County, New York

- U.S. National Register of Historic Places
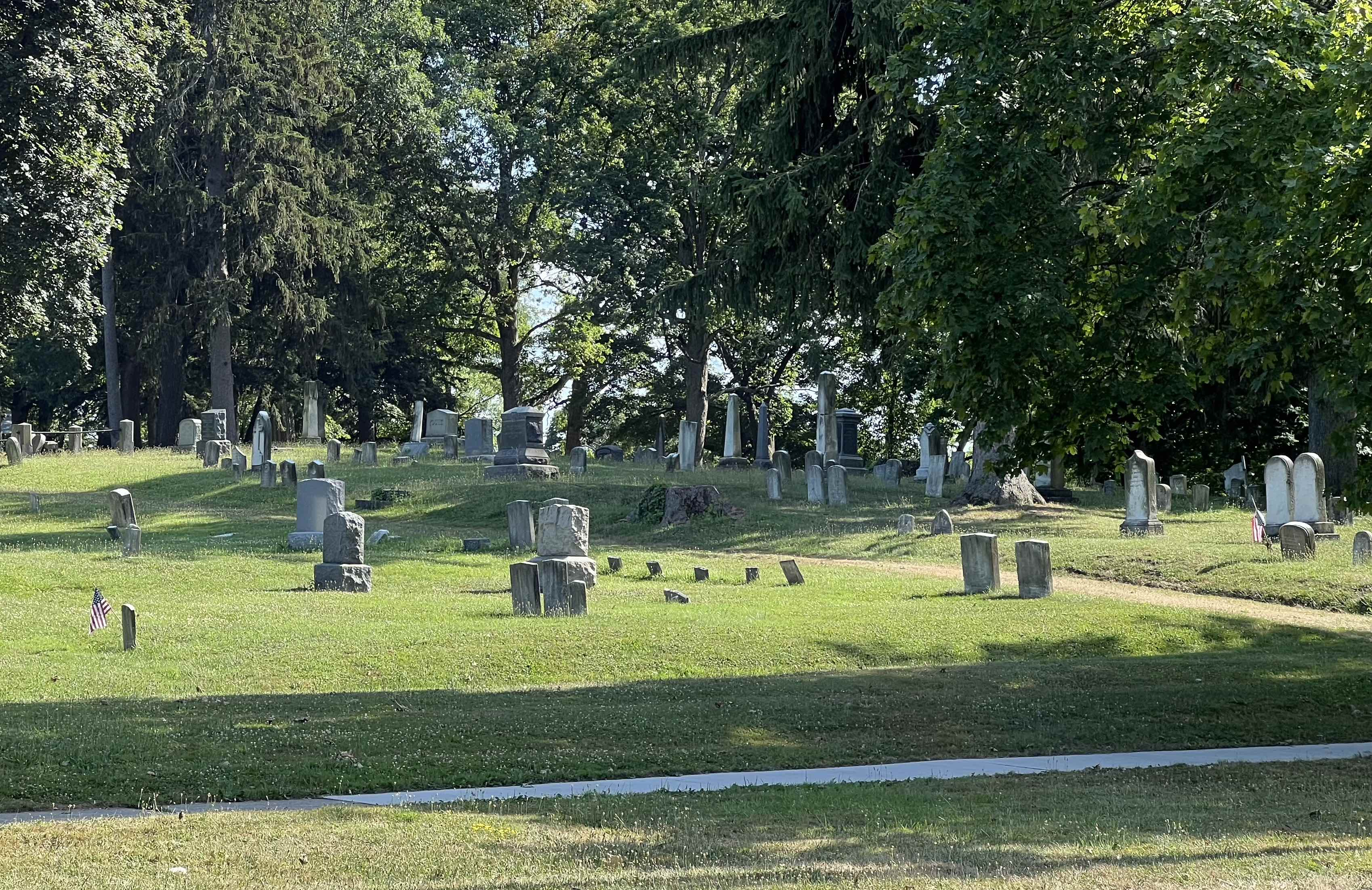

- Location within New York Location within the United States
- Location: Washington St., Geneva, New York
- Coordinates: 42°51′44″N 76°59′27″W
- Area: 5 acres (2.0 ha)
- Built: 1832
- NRHP reference No.: 02000616
- Added to NRHP: June 04, 2002

Washington Street Cemetery is a historic cemetery located at Geneva in Ontario County, New York. The cemetery was laid out in 1832 and the entry is distinguished by a handsome cast iron arch dating from the 1840s / 1850s. It contains about 2,200 burials dating from 1832 to the 1950s.

It was listed on the National Register of Historic Places in 2002.

== Notable burials ==
- Eliakim Sherrill
- Samuel Miles Hopkins
- Joseph Gardner Swift, the first graduate of West Point Military Academy
