= Nathaniel W. Howell =

American politician

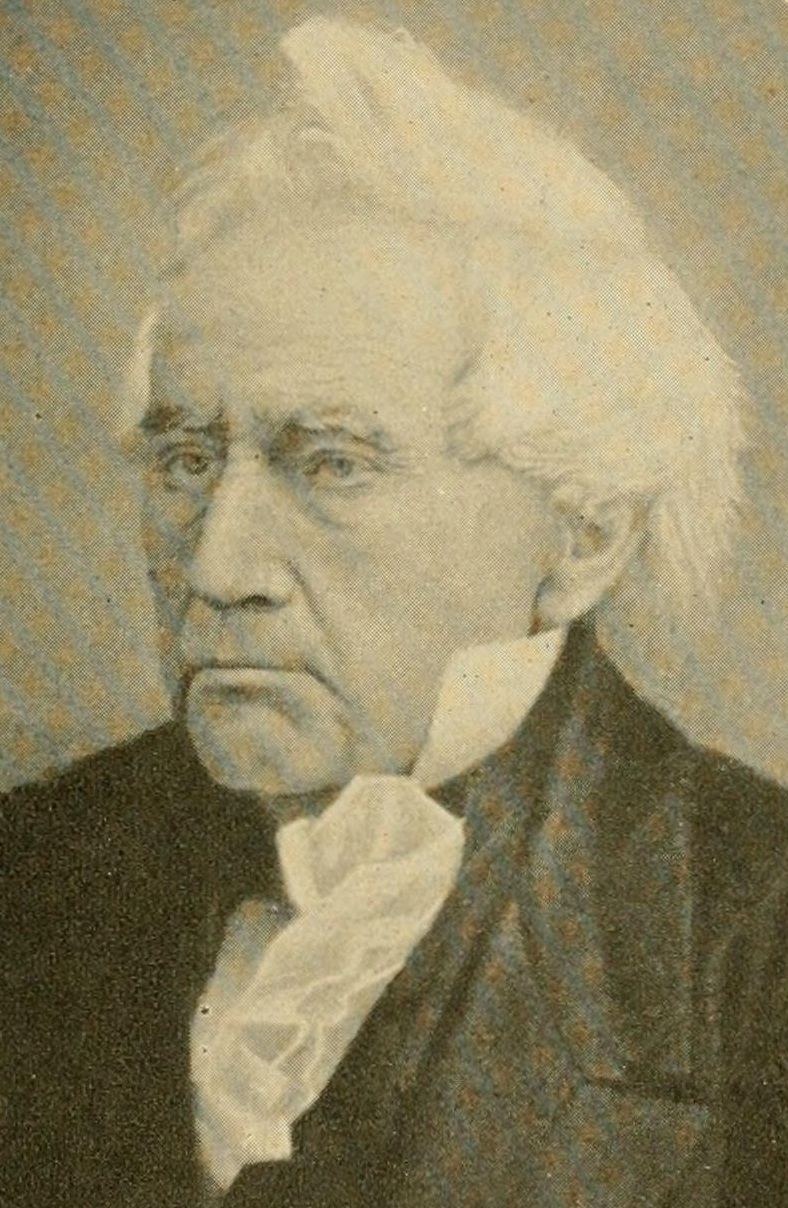
Nathaniel Woodhull Howell, Congressman from New York.

Nathaniel Woodhull Howell (January 1, 1770 – October 15, 1851) was a United States representative from New York. Born in Blooming Grove, Orange County, he graduated from Princeton College in 1788. He taught school in Montgomery, New York from 1789 to 1792, studied law, was admitted to the bar and practiced in New York City and in Tioga County from 1794 to 1796, and in Canandaigua from 1796 to 1851.

Howell was attorney general for western New York from 1799 to 1802 and a member of the New York State Assembly in 1804. He was an unsuccessful candidate for Congress in 1802, 1804, and 1808, the first two times in the 17th congressional district and the third in the 15th congressional district. He was elected as a Federalist to the Thirteenth Congress, holding office from March 4, 1813 to March 3, 1815. He was appointed a member of the commission to appraise the Western Inland Lock Navigation Co. in 1817, and was the first judge of Ontario County, holding that office from 1819 to 1832. He died in Canandaiga and was buried in West Avenue Cemetery.

U.S. House of Representatives
New district	Member of the U.S. House of Representatives from New York's 21st congressional district 1813–1815 with Samuel M. Hopkins	Succeeded by Peter Buell Porter, Micah Brooks
