= DeWitt Clinton =

American politician (1769–1828)

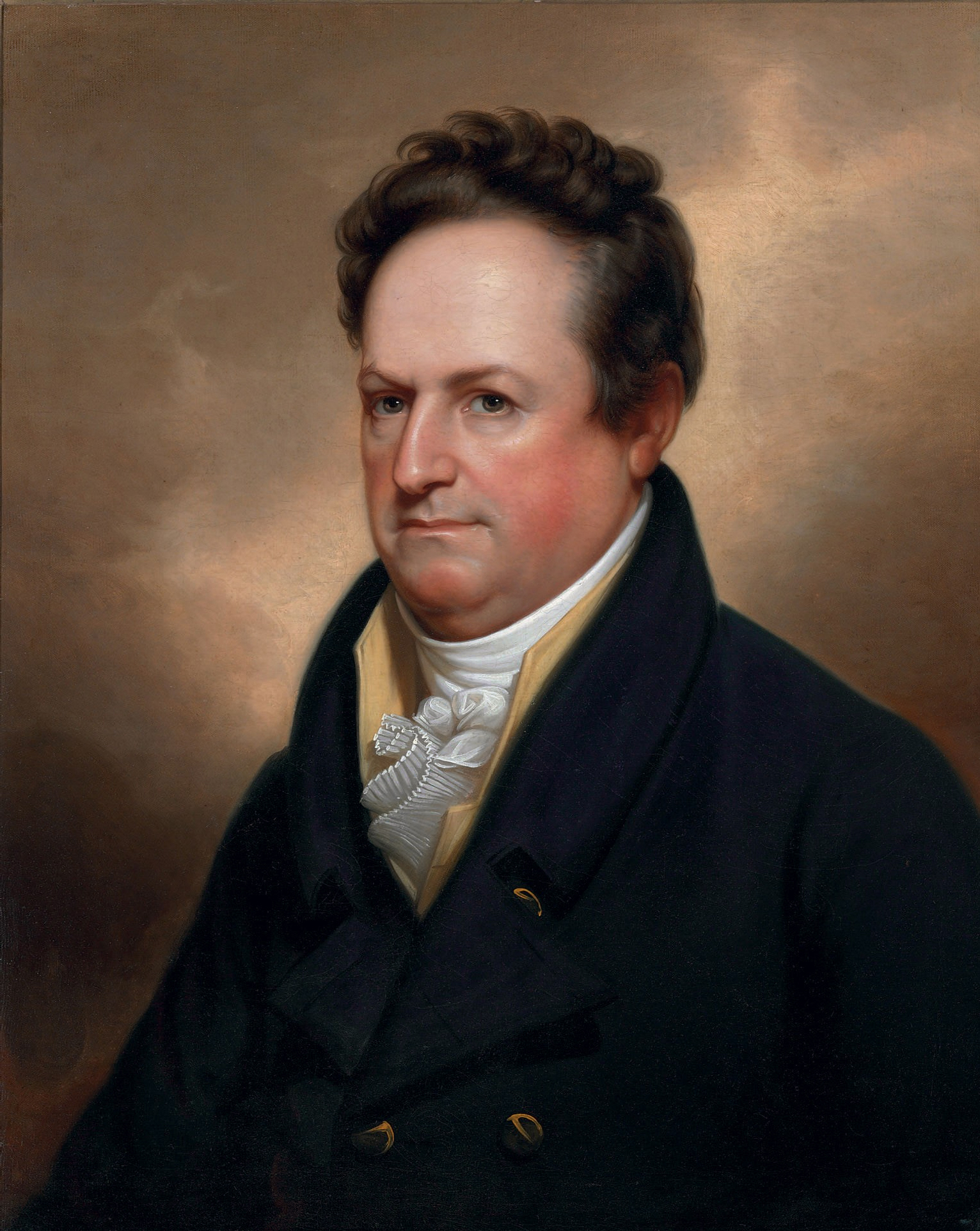
- Portrait of DeWitt Clinton by Rembrandt Peale, c. 1823

6th Governor of New York
- In office January 1, 1825 – February 11, 1828
- Lieutenant: James Tallmadge Jr. Nathaniel Pitcher
- Preceded by: Joseph C. Yates
- Succeeded by: Nathaniel Pitcher
- In office July 1, 1817 – January 1, 1823
- Lieutenant: John Tayler
- Preceded by: John Tayler (acting)
- Succeeded by: Joseph C. Yates

48th, 50th and 52nd Mayor of New York City
- In office 1811–1815
- Preceded by: Jacob Radcliff
- Succeeded by: John Ferguson
- In office 1808–1810
- Preceded by: Marinus Willett
- Succeeded by: Jacob Radcliff
- In office 1803–1807
- Preceded by: Edward Livingston
- Succeeded by: Marinus Willett

Lieutenant Governor of New York
- In office 1811–1813
- Governor: Daniel D. Tompkins
- Preceded by: John Tayler (acting)
- Succeeded by: John Tayler

United States Senator from New York
- In office February 9, 1802 – November 4, 1803
- Preceded by: John Armstrong Jr.
- Succeeded by: John Armstrong Jr.

Personal details
- Born: March 2, 1769 Little Britain, New York, British America
- Died: February 11, 1828 (aged 58) Albany, New York, U.S.
- Party: Democratic-Republican
- Other political affiliations: Federalist (1812)
- Spouses: Maria Franklin (m. 1796; died 1818) Catharine Jones (m. 1819)
- Children: 10, including George W. Clinton
- Education: Princeton University; Columbia University (BA)

DeWitt Clinton (Note: Clinton's name was almost always spelled De Witt during his lifetime.) (March 2, 1769 – February 11, 1828) was an American politician and naturalist. He served as a United States senator, as the mayor of New York City, and as the sixth governor of New York. In the last capacity, he was largely responsible for the construction of the Erie Canal. Clinton was a major candidate for the American presidency in the election of 1812, challenging incumbent James Madison.

A nephew of two-term U.S. vice president and New York governor George Clinton, DeWitt Clinton was his uncle's secretary before launching his own political career. As a Democratic-Republican, Clinton won election to the New York State Legislature in 1798 before briefly serving as a U.S. Senator. Returning to New York, Clinton served three terms as the appointed Mayor of New York City and the lieutenant governor of New York State. In the 1812 presidential election, Clinton won support from the Federalists as well as from a group of Democratic-Republicans who were dissatisfied with Madison. Though Madison won re-election, Clinton carried most of the Northeastern United States and fared significantly better than the previous two Federalist-supported tickets. After the presidential election, Clinton continued to be affiliated with the Democratic-Republican Party.

Clinton was governor of New York from 1817 to 1822 and from 1825 to 1828, and presided over the construction of the Erie Canal. Clinton believed that infrastructure improvements could transform American life, drive economic growth, and encourage political participation. He heavily influenced the development of infrastructure both in New York State and in the United States as a whole.

== Early life ==
Clinton was born on March 2, 1769, the second son born to Major-General James Clinton and his wife Mary De Witt (1737–1795), who was a descendant of the Dutch patrician De Witt family. He was born in Little Britain, New York, which today is a hamlet in the western part of New Windsor. He attended Kingston Academy and began his college studies at the College of New Jersey (now known as Princeton University) before transferring to King's College (which was renamed Columbia College while he was a student there; Clinton was in the first class to graduate under the school's new name.) He was the brother of U.S. Representative George Clinton Jr., the half-brother of U.S. Representative James G. Clinton, and the cousin of Simeon De Witt. He became the secretary to his uncle George Clinton, who was then governor of New York. Soon afterwards he became a member of the Democratic-Republican Party.

== Political career ==
=== Early career ===
Clinton was a member of the New York State Assembly in 1798, and of the New York State Senate (representing its Southern District) in 1798–1802 and 1806–1811 He was a delegate to the New York State Constitutional Convention in 1801.

In 1801, his uncle George Clinton appointed him to head the Council of Appointments, which held the power under the state constitution to appoint thousands of public positions, including sheriffs and the mayor of New York City. He would serve on the committee from 1801 to 1802 and again from 1806 to 1807. As chair of the council, Clinton controlled patronage throughout the state. Because the council was overwhelmingly Republican and loyal to the Clintons, DeWitt suddenly became the most powerful politician in the state. He used his power to deny supporters of Aaron Burr and members of the Tammany Society key roles.

In 1802, he used his authority as a director of the Manhattan Company, the leading Republican bank in the state, to force the withdrawal of Burr and his key supporter John Swartwout. Swartwout accused Clinton of destroying Burr to advance his own political career; in response, Clinton called Swartwout "a liar, a scoundrel and a villain". Swartwout challenged Clinton to a duel in New Jersey (where duelling was legal), in which Clinton wounded Swartwout.

The New York State legislature elected him to fill New York's U.S. Senate seat, which had been left vacant by the resignation of John Armstrong Jr.; he served in that capacity from February 9, 1802, to November 4, 1803. He resigned due to unhappiness with his living conditions in the newly built city of Washington, DC; next, he was appointed the mayor of New York City.

=== Mayor of New York City ===
He served as mayor of New York from 1803 to 1807, 1808 to 1810, and 1811 to 1815. He organized the New-York Historical Society in 1804 and was its president, and he was a leader in launching the Erie Canal. He also helped to reorganize the American Academy of the Fine Arts in 1808 and served as its president between 1813 and 1817. He was a regent of the University of the State of New York from 1808 to 1825. Clinton was also elected a member of the American Antiquarian Society in 1814 and was its vice president from 1821 to 1828. In 1816, he was elected a fellow of the American Academy of Arts and Sciences.

=== Lieutenant Governor of New York ===
In 1811, the death of John Broome left a vacancy in the office of lieutenant governor of New York. In a special election, Clinton defeated the Federalist Nicholas Fish and the Tammany Hall candidate Marinus Willett to become lieutenant governor until the end of the term in June 1813.

=== Presidential campaign ===
Clinton's uncle, George Clinton, had attempted to challenge James Madison for the presidency in 1808 but was chosen as the party's vice presidential nominee instead. In 1812, after George Clinton's death, the elder Clinton's supporters gravitated towards DeWitt Clinton. Clinton ran for president as a candidate both for the Federalist Party and for a small group of antiwar Democratic-Republicans. In the close election of 1812, Clinton was defeated by President Madison. Clinton received 89 electoral votes to Madison's 128. It was the strongest showing of any Federalist candidate for the U.S. presidency since 1800, and a change in the votes of one or two states would have given Clinton the victory.

=== Governor of New York ===
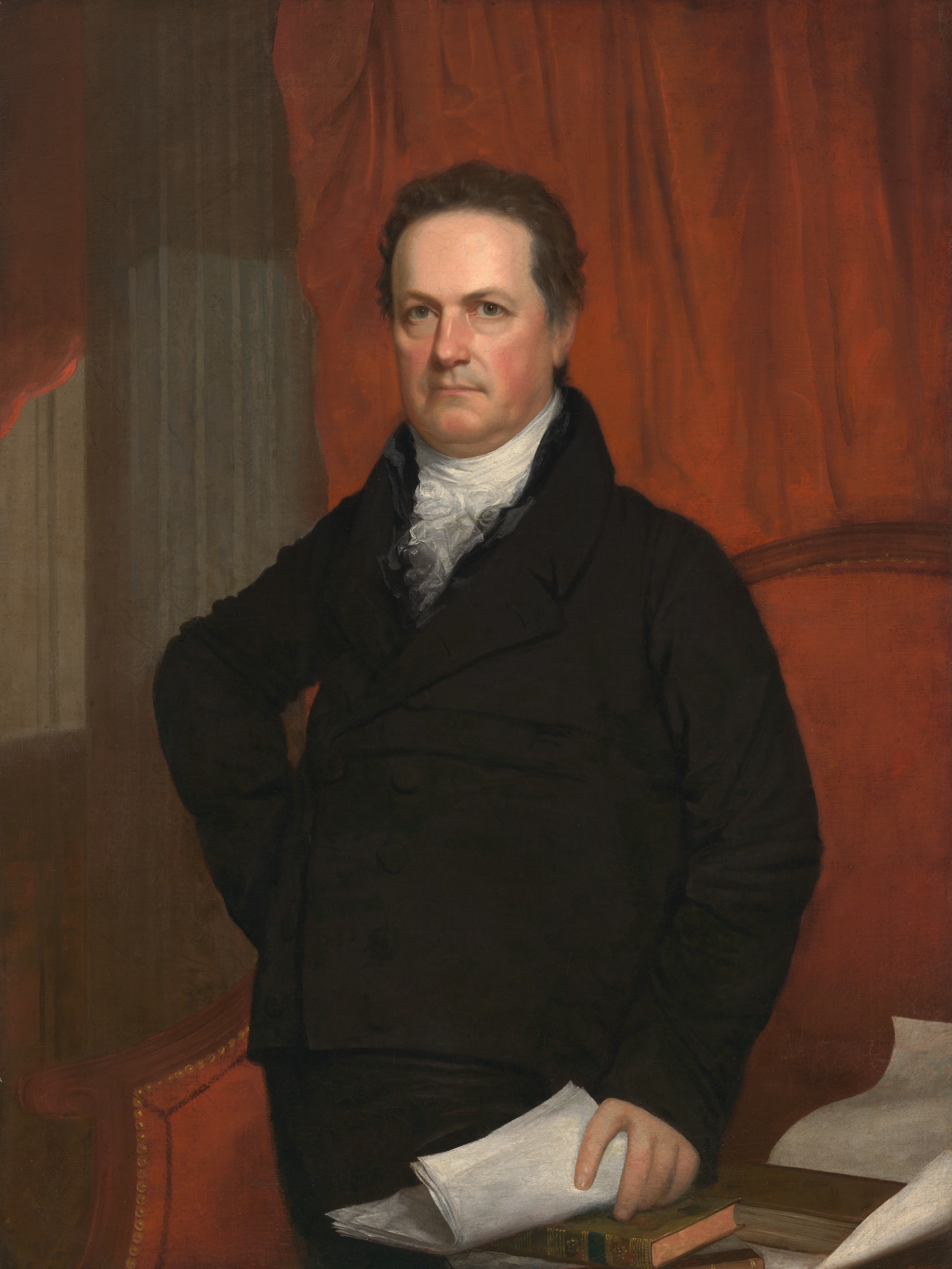
Portrait by John Wesley Jarvis, c. 1816

After the resignation of Daniel D. Tompkins, who had been elected vice president, he won a special gubernatorial election in which he was the only candidate; 1,479 votes were cast for Peter Buell Porter against Clinton's 43,310, because the Tammany organization, which fiercely hated Clinton, had printed ballots with Porter's name on them and distributed them among the Tammany followers in New York City. On July 1, 1817, Clinton took office as governor of New York. He was re-elected in 1820, defeating Vice President Tompkins in a narrow race—DeWitt Clinton received 47,447 votes, as opposed to Tompkins's 45,900—and served until December 31, 1822.

During his second term, the New York State Constitutional Convention of 1821 shortened the gubernatorial term to two years and moved the beginning of the term from July 1 to January 1, which cut off the last six months of his three-year term. The gubernatorial election was also moved from April to November, but Clinton was not renominated by his party to run for re-election in November 1822. Even so, he kept his post as president of the Erie Canal Commission. In April 1824, most of his political opponents, the Bucktails, voted in the New York State legislature for his removal from the Canal Commission, which caused such a wave of indignation among the electorate that he was nominated for governor by the People's Party and was re-elected governor, defeating the official candidate of the Democratic-Republican Party, his fellow Canal Commissioner Samuel Young. He served another two terms until his sudden death in office.

=== Freemasonry ===
Clinton was a York Rite Freemason. He was initiated in the "Holland" Lodge No. 16 (now No 8), NY on September 3, 1790, and, in 1806, he was elected Grand Master of the Grand Lodge of New York. Clinton was essential in establishing the Grand Encampment of Knights Templar in the United States and served as its first, second, and third grand master from 1816 to 1828. He retained the title until his death in 1828.

In 1826, the William Morgan Affair occurred in Batavia. Morgan, who threatened to publish an exposé of the rituals of Freemasonry, disappeared and was apparently kidnapped and supposedly murdered by Masons. Clinton issued three proclamations, each increasing the reward for information and conviction of the perpetrators until it reached $2,000. Clinton's proclamations had no effect, however, and the Masonic fraternity underwent a period of severe decline in many regions of the United States because of criticism set off by the scandal.

The Grand Lodge of New York has established the DeWitt Clinton Award, which recognizes distinguished or outstanding community service by non-Masonic organizations or individuals whose actions exemplify a shared concern for the well-being of Mankind and a belief in the worldwide brotherhood of Man.

== Erie Canal ==
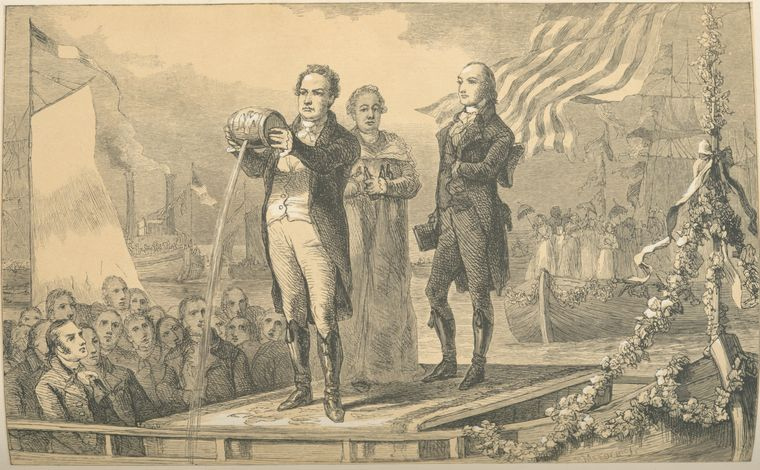
Print showing Clinton mingling the waters of Lake Erie and the Atlantic, in a ceremony in 1826

From 1810 to 1824, Clinton was a member of the Erie Canal Commission. He was among its first members, who were appointed in 1810 and planned and surveyed the route to be taken.

As governor, Clinton was largely responsible for the construction of the Erie Canal. He was persuaded by Canal proponent Jesse Hawley to support construction of a canal from the eastern shore of Lake Erie to the upper Hudson River. Many thought the project to be impracticable, and opponents mocked it as "Clinton's Folly" and "DeWitt's Ditch". But in 1817, he persuaded the legislature to appropriate $7 million ($168,315,263.16 in 2025 dollars) for its construction.

When the canal was finished in 1825, Clinton opened it and traveled in the packet boat Seneca Chief along the canal to Buffalo. After riding from the mouth of Lake Erie to New York City, he emptied two casks of water from Lake Erie into New York Harbor to celebrate the first connection of waters from the East with waters from the West. The canal was an immense success, carrying huge numbers of passengers and a huge amount of freight traffic. The cost of moving freight between Buffalo and Albany fell from $100 to $10 per ton, and the state was able to quickly recoup the funds that it had spent on the project by collecting tolls along the canal. The completion of the canal brought about a significant shift in public opinion about Clinton: he was now hailed for having completed the canal.

That change in public opinion was reflected in the newspapers of the time. They had previously been filled with harsh criticisms of Clinton and the canal, but now celebrated his accomplishment. For example, an article in the New Hampshire Sentinel began: "The efforts of Gov. Clinton to advance the best interest of the State over which he presides are very generally acknowledged both by his constituents and the public abroad. His exertions in favor of the great canal have identified his name with that noble enterprise, and he will be remembered while its benefits are experienced" It ended, "Yield credit to Clinton, and hail him by name".

== Philanthropy ==
Together with financier Thomas Eddy, he was a director of New York's earliest savings bank established to serve laborers and the poor, The Bank for Savings in the City of New-York.

== Personal life ==
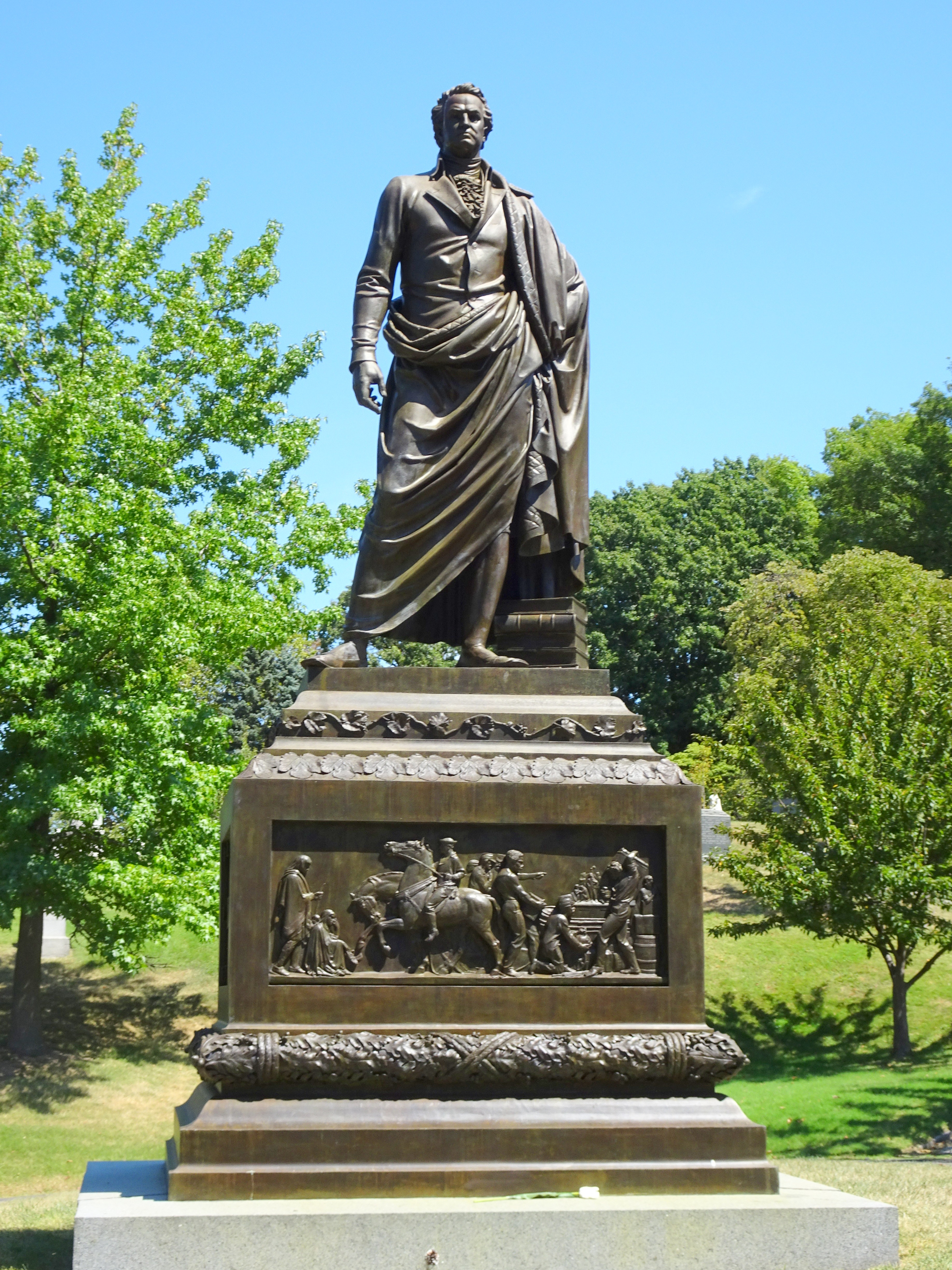
Clinton Memorial by Henry Kirke Brown, 1855, at Green-Wood Cemetery, Brooklyn, New York

Clinton was married twice. On February 13, 1796, he married Maria Franklin, daughter of the prominent New York Quaker merchant Walter Franklin and descendant of John Bowne and Elizabeth Fones. With her, he had ten children, and four sons and three daughters had survived at the time of her death in 1818. Among his children with Franklin was George William Clinton, who served as mayor of Buffalo, New York from 1842 to 1843.

On May 8, 1819, Clinton married Catharine Jones, the daughter of a New York physician, Thomas Jones and his wife, Margaret (née Livingston) Jones (a daughter of Edward Livingston). Catharine's sister, Mary (née Jones) Gelston, was the wife of Deacon Maltby Gelston of Southampton, and the mother of David Gelston, Collector of the Port of New York. Catharine outlived her husband.

In 1813, Clinton became a hereditary member of the New York Society of the Cincinnati in succession to his brother, Lieutenant Alexander Clinton, who was an original member of the society. In that same year, he was elected as a member to the American Philosophical Society.

When Clinton died suddenly of heart failure in Albany on February 11, 1828, he left his family in poor financial condition. While he was a fine administrator in government, he had handled his own financial affairs rather poorly. As a result, the Clinton family was badly in debt and had no means of support after the governor's death. One creditor alone put in a claim for $6,000. Fearing that he might not get his money, the creditor obtained a judgment that resulted in a public sale of most of the Clinton family possessions. Enough money was realized from the sale of the property to satisfy the judgment, but nothing was left to help the Clinton family through the difficult years ahead. The governor received the grandest of state funerals, but when it was all over, the family had no place to bury him. His widow was completely without funds to purchase a suitable grave site. As a result, Clinton's remains were placed in the family vault of Dr. Samuel Stringer (1735–1817), an old friend and fellow Mason from Albany, in the old Swan Street Cemetery.

Sixteen years later, enough money was collected to provide a suitable burial. On June 21, 1844, a newspaper in Albany printed this small announcement: "The remains of DeWitt Clinton, which had been deposited in the cemetery in Swan Street, were removed to New York for interment under a monument created by the family." Clinton was reinterred at the Green-Wood Cemetery in Brooklyn, New York.

== Legacy ==
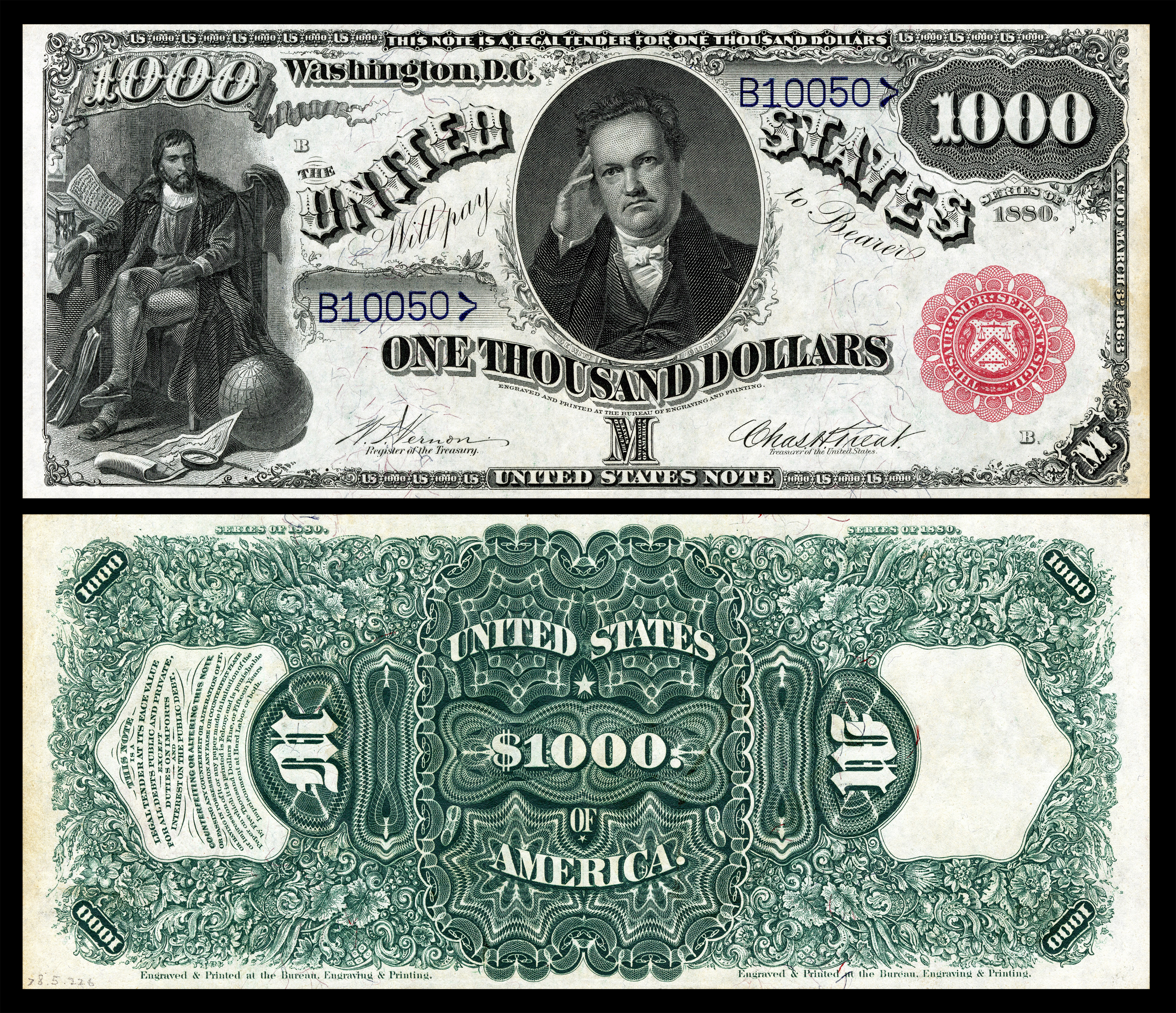
$1,000 Legal Tender note, Series 1880, Fr.187k, depicting DeWitt Clinton

Clinton's accomplishments as a leader in civic and state affairs included improving the New York public school system, encouraging steam navigation, and modifying the laws governing criminals and debtors. The 1831 DeWitt Clinton locomotive was named in his honor. The community of Whitestone, New York was for several decades after his death known as Clintonville, but reverted to its traditional name; however, the governor is memorialized by Clintonville Street, a major local road.

- An engraved portrait of Clinton appeared on the Legal Tender (United States Note) issue of 1880 in the $1,000.00 denomination. An illustrated example is on the website of Federal Reserve Bank of San Francisco's "American Currency Exhibit".
- Iowa has one county named for the New York governor whose canal greatly stimulated national growth: Clinton County (founded 1837). The county seat of Clinton is the City of Clinton.
- Illinois has two counties named for the New York governor, making him the only person to ever have two counties in the same state as a namesake. The two counties are Clinton County and DeWitt County. The county seat of DeWitt county is Clinton.
- In 1926 the DeWitt Clinton Professorship of American History was established at Columbia University; the first to hold the chair was Evarts Boutell Greene.
- DeWitt Clinton became a focus of public attention related to the Erie Canal's bicentennial, which began in 2017 (the 200th anniversary of the original canal's groundbreaking) and ended October 26, 2025 (the 200th anniversary of the canal's opening). In a New York City event on July 4, 2017, actor Kyle Jenks read Clinton's 1815 canal manifesto on the steps of Federal Hall in lower Manhattan. In December 2017, the Museum of the City of New York completed a renovation of a statue of Clinton, along with one of Alexander Hamilton, located on the museum's exterior. Also that year, a book featuring descendants of DeWitt Clinton exploring ruins of the original canal, titled In DeWitt's Footsteps, was published by journalist Kenneth Silber. On October 26, 2025, Gov. Kathy Hochul and others, including DeWitt Silber, a great-times-five grandson of DeWitt Clinton, spoke at a canal anniversary celebration on a Hudson River pier in front of a replica of Clinton's Seneca Chief boat.
- March 2, 2019 was the 250th anniversary, or semiquincentennial, of DeWitt Clinton's birth. The milestone was marked by events at the Erie Canal Museum in Syracuse and the Buffalo Maritime Center.
- Following his New York Governorship, DeWitt became a popular given name - see DeWitt (name).
- The City of DeWitt, Michigan is named for Clinton as is the city of DeWitt, Iowa.
- Both the town and township of Clinton, New Jersey are named after him.
- The township of Clinton, Indiana is named after him.
- The city of Clinton, Louisiana in East Feliciana Parish, Louisiana founded in 1824 is named after him.
- Clintonia, a genus of flowering plants described by Rafinesque in 1818, was named in honor of DeWitt Clinton.

His portrait appears on many tobacco tax stamps of the late 1800s to early 1900s.

== Sources ==
- Bobbé, Dorothie de Bear (1962). De Witt Clinton. I. J. Friedman.
- Cornog, Evan (1998). The Birth of Empire: DeWitt Clinton and the American Experience, 1769-1828. Oxford University Press. ISBN 9780195119497. online
- De Villo, Sloan (2008). The Crimsoned Hills of Onondaga. Cambria Press. ISBN 978-1604975031.
- Hanyan, Craig; Hanyan, Mary L. (1996). De Witt Clinton and the Rise of the People's Men. McGill-Queen's University Press. ISBN 978-0773514348., online
- Howe, Daniel Walker (2007). What Hath God Wrought: The Transformation of America, 1815–1848. Oxford History of the United States. Oxford University Press. ISBN 978-0-19-507894-7.
- Siry, Steven Edwin (1985). "The Sectional Politics of "Practical Republicanism": De Witt Clinton's Presidential Bid, 1810-1812". Journal of the Early Republic. 5 (4): 441–462. doi:10.2307/3123061. JSTOR 3123061.
- Spanagel, David I. (2014). DeWitt Clinton and Amos Eaton: Geology and Power in Early New York. Johns Hopkins University Press. ISBN 978-1421411040.
- Zinman, Donald A. (2024). America's First Wartime Election: James Madison, DeWitt Clinton, and the War of 1812. Lawrence, KS: University Press of Kansas.

U.S. Senate
Preceded by John Armstrong Jr.	U.S. Senator (Class 3) from New York; 1802–1803; Served alongside: Gouverneur Morris, Theodorus Bailey	Succeeded by Marinus Willett
Political offices
Preceded by Edward Livingston	Mayor of New York City; 1803–1807	Succeeded by Marinus Willett
Preceded by Marinus Willett	Mayor of New York City; 1808–1810	Succeeded by Jacob Radcliff
Preceded by Jacob Radcliff	Mayor of New York City; 1811–1815	Succeeded by John Ferguson
Preceded by John Tayler; Acting	Lieutenant Governor of New York; 1811–1813	Succeeded by John Tayler
Preceded by John Tayler; Acting	Governor of New York; 1817–1822	Succeeded by Joseph C. Yates
Preceded by Joseph C. Yates	Governor of New York; 1825–1828	Succeeded by Nathaniel Pitcher
Party political offices
Preceded by Charles Cotesworth Pinckney	Federalist nominee for President of the United States; Endorsed; 1812	Succeeded by Rufus King
Preceded by Daniel D. Tompkins	Democratic-Republican nominee for Governor of New York; 1817, 1820	Succeeded by Joseph C. Yates
Preceded by Joseph C. Yates	Democratic-Republican nominee for Governor of New York; 1824, 1826	Succeeded by Martin Van Buren; Democratic
Masonic offices
Preceded by Jacob Morton	Grand Master of the Grand Lodge of New York; 1806–1819	Succeeded by Daniel D. Tompkins
