= Peter Buell Porter =

American politician (1773–1844)

Peter Porter
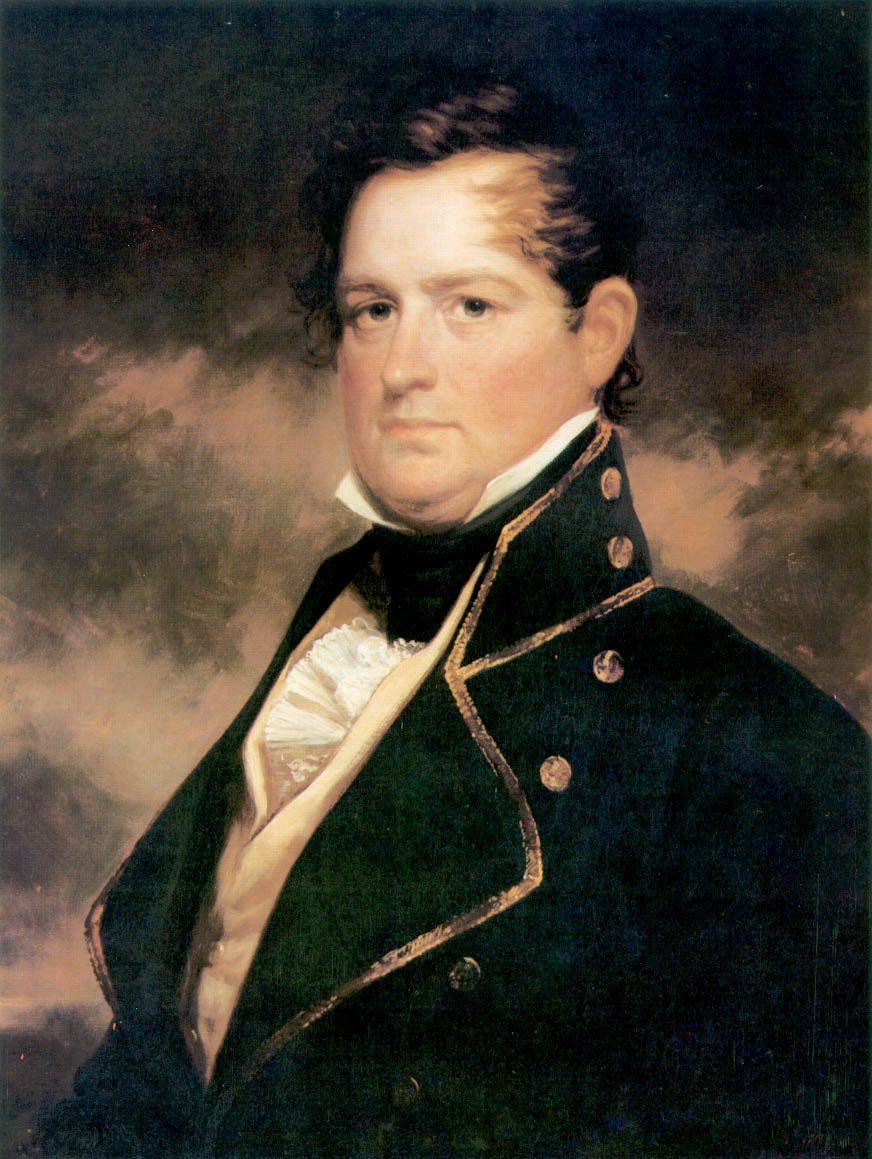
- Portrait by Daniel Huntington, c. 1873

12th United States Secretary of War
- In office May 23, 1828 – March 9, 1829
- President: John Quincy Adams; Andrew Jackson
- Preceded by: James Barbour
- Succeeded by: John Henry Eaton

Member of the New York Assembly from Erie County
- In office January 1, 1828 – May 23, 1828

11th Secretary of State of New York
- In office February 16, 1815 – February 12, 1816
- Governor: Daniel D. Tompkins
- Preceded by: Jacob R. Van Rensselaer
- Succeeded by: Robert L. Tillotson

Member of the U.S. House of Representatives from New York
- In office March 4, 1815 – January 23, 1816
- Preceded by: Nathaniel W. Howell
- Succeeded by: Archibald S. Clarke
- Constituency: 21st district
- In office March 4, 1809 – March 3, 1813
- Preceded by: William Kirkpatrick
- Succeeded by: Joel Thompson
- Constituency: 15th district

Member of the New York Assembly from Ontario County and Steuben County
- In office January 26, 1802 – April 5, 1802

Personal details
- Born: Peter Buell Porter; August 14, 1773 Salisbury, Connecticut Colony, British America
- Died: March 20, 1844 (aged 70) Niagara Falls, New York, U.S.
- Resting place: Oakwood Cemetery
- Party: Democratic-Republican (Before 1825); National Republican (1825–1834); Whig (1834–1844)
- Spouse: Letitia Breckinridge (m. 1818; died 1831)
- Children: 2, including Peter
- Relatives: Augustus Porter (Brother)
- Education: Yale University (BA); Litchfield Law School
- Awards: Congressional Gold Medal

Military service
- Allegiance: United States; New York
- Branch/service: New York State Militia
- Years of service: 1812–1815
- Rank: Major General
- Battles/wars: War of 1812; Raid on Black Rock; Battle of Chippawa; Battle of Lundy's Lane; Siege of Fort Erie

Peter Buell Porter (August 14, 1773 – March 20, 1844) was an American lawyer, soldier and politician who served as United States Secretary of War from 1828 to 1829.

== Early life ==
Porter was born on August 14, 1773, one of six children born to Dr. Joshua Porter (1730–1825) and Abigail Buell (1734–1797), who married in 1759 in Lebanon, Connecticut. His siblings were: Joshua Porter (1760–1831), Abigail Porter (1763–1797), Eunice Porter (1766–1848), Augustus Porter (1769–1849), Sally Porter (1776–1820). His father, Dr. Joshua Porter, a 1754 graduate of Yale, fought in the Revolutionary War as a colonel. He was at the head of his regiment in October 1777 when John Burgoyne surrendered his 6,000 men after the Battles of Saratoga. After the war, he was elected to various official positions for forty-eight consecutive years. His maternal grandparents were Peter and Martha Buell (née Grant) of Coventry, Connecticut.

He attended and graduated from Yale College in 1791, studied law in Litchfield, Connecticut with Judge Tapping Reeve, who also taught Aaron Burr and John C. Calhoun.

== Career ==
In 1793, Porter was admitted to the bar, and commenced practice in Canandaigua, New York. From 1797 to 1804, he was Clerk of Ontario County, and was a member of the New York State Assembly (Ontario and Steuben Co.) in 1802. In the fall of 1809, Porter moved to Black Rock, New York, later part of Buffalo, and became a member of the firm of Porter, Barton & Company with his brother Augustus, which controlled transportation on the Niagara River. The company portaged goods by land from Lake Erie to Lewiston on the Niagara River through Niagara Falls, then shipped them east on Lake Ontario.

=== United States Congress ===
In 1809, he was elected to the United States House of Representatives as a Democratic-Republican. He served in the 11th and 12th United States Congresses, holding office from March 4, 1809, to March 3, 1813. During his service in Congress, he was a leading figure among Congressional "war hawks" and Chairman of the Committee that recommended preparation for war with Great Britain, and was known as an early supporter of James Madison. Porter, along with Henry Clay and others, pressured Madison to end the discussion and take up arms against England, in what became known as the War of 1812.

At the same time, from 1810 to 1816, he was a member of the Erie Canal Commission, a commission on inland navigation established in 1810 by the New York State Legislature to survey a canal route from the Hudson River to the Great Lakes. Porter served on the Commission with fellow Democratic-Republicans, Simeon De Witt and DeWitt Clinton. The Federalists on the Committee were Gouverneur Morris, William North, Thomas Eddy, and Stephen Van Rensselaer. In 1811, Porter and the Democratic-Republicans were joined by Robert R. Livingston and Robert Fulton. Charles D. Cooper joined in 1815.

=== War of 1812 ===
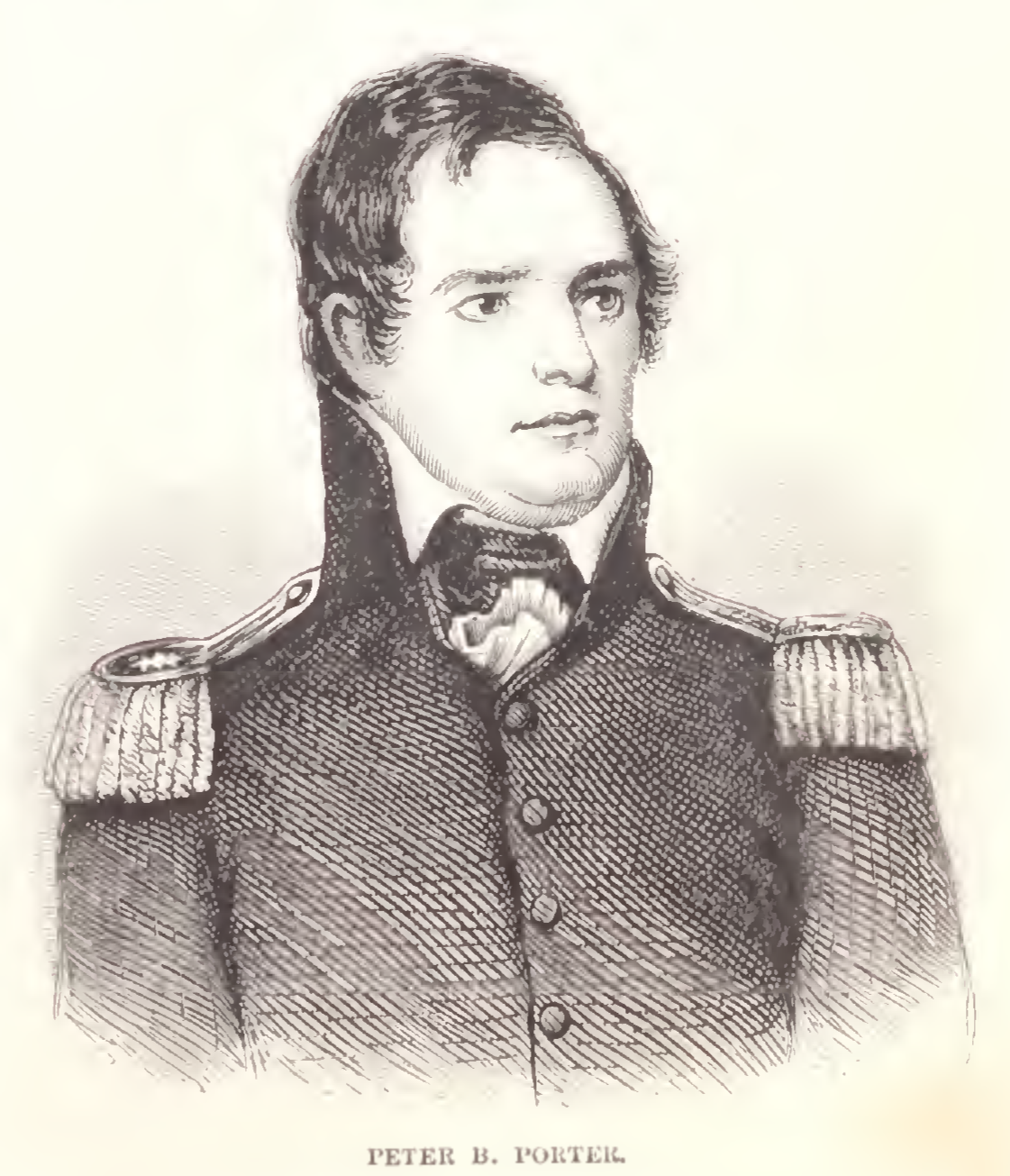
c. 1864 portrait of Porter during the War of 1812

While in Congress, Porter, realizing the level of America’s unpreparedness for war, pushed for greater numbers of soldiers and supplies. When his efforts fell on deaf ears, he instead offered his experience in trade to the military. Beginning in May 1812, he was served as assistant quartermaster general in the New York State Militia. As a brigadier general, he participated in and criticized General Alexander Smyth’s abortive operations against British Canada in 1813 at the Battle of Black Rock, culminating in a bloodless duel between the two. The historian John R. Elting wrote of the duel, stating "Unfortunately, both missed."

Porter later raised and commanded a brigade of New York militia that incorporated a Six Nations Indian contingent and led his command with distinction. He brokered a deal with Red Jacket, who agreed to provide 500 troops under Porter's command. For his actions, he was presented a gold medal under joint resolution of Congress dated November 3, 1814 "for gallantry and good conduct" during the Battle of Chippewa, the Battle of Niagara, and the Siege of Fort Erie.

With the end of military operations, Porter went to Washington where he was given command of all American forces on the Niagara Frontier by President Madison. When news of a peace treaty arrived, he returned to civilian life and was declared a hero by his fellow citizens.

=== End of the War ===
With the end of military operations, Porter went to Washington where he was given command of all American forces on the Niagara Frontier by President Madison. When news of a peace treaty arrived, he returned to civilian life and was declared a hero by his fellow citizens.

=== New York politics and return to Congress ===
From February 1815 to February 1816, he served as Secretary of State of New York as a Democratic-Republican under New York Governor Daniel D. Tompkins. He was also elected to the 14th United States Congress. Although his term in Congress began on March 4, 1815, the actual Session began only in December, and he took his seat on December 11, 1815. On January 23, 1816, he resigned, having been appointed a Commissioner under the Treaty of Ghent, which caused a controversy as to the constitutionality of sitting in Congress and holding this commissionership at the same time.

In 1817, his political friends of Tammany Hall printed ballots with his name and distributed them among their followers to vote for Porter for Governor of New York at the special election which was held after the resignation of Governor Daniel D. Tompkins. DeWitt Clinton, the otherwise unopposed candidate, was fiercely hated by the Tammany organization, and Porter received about 1,300 votes although he was not really running for the office. Porter became a regent of the University of the State of New York in 1824, and served in that capacity until 1830.

He was again a member of the State Assembly (Erie Co.) in 1828, but vacated his seat when he was appointed to the Cabinet.

=== Secretary of War ===
From May 16, 1828, to March 9, 1829, Porter served as U.S. Secretary of War under President John Quincy Adams, and was an advocate for the removal of Eastern Indians beyond the Mississippi. He moved to Niagara Falls in 1836 and was a presidential elector on the Whig ticket in 1840.

== Personal life ==
In 1818, Porter married Letitia Breckinridge (1786–1831), the daughter of John Breckinridge (1760–1806), a U.S. Senator from Kentucky from 1801 to 1805, and Attorney General of the United States under Jefferson from 1805 to 1806. Her mother was Mary Hopkins Cabell, of the Cabell political family. Letitia was widowed from her first marriage in 1804, to Alfred William Grayson, who had died in 1810. Grayson, a graduate of Cambridge University, was the son of Senator William Grayson of Virginia. Through her first marriage, she had a son, John Breckinridge Grayson (1806–1862). Together, Peter and Letitia had:

- Peter Augustus Porter (1827–1864), who married Mary Cabell Breckenridge (1826–1854)
- Elizabeth Lewis Porter (1828–1876), who was rumored to have almost married Millard Fillmore, who later served as President of the United States from 1850 to 1853.

On March 20, 1844, General Porter died in Niagara Falls and was interred in Oakwood Cemetery, along with brother Augustus.

=== Descendants ===
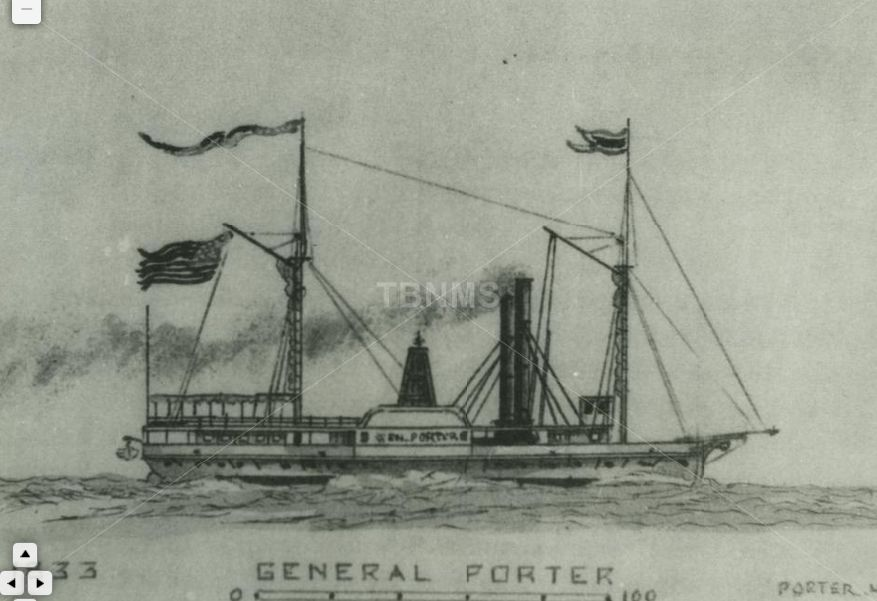
A paddle-steamer named the General Porter was launched in 1834.

His son, Peter A. Porter died in the bloody Battle of Cold Harbor during the American Civil War. His grandson was Peter Augustus Porter (1853–1925), a U.S. Representative from New York and his nephews were Augustus Seymour Porter, a United States Senator from Michigan, and Peter B. Porter, Jr., an Assemblyman and Speaker of the New York State Assembly.

=== Slave ownership ===
In 1820, Porter and his wife Letitia signed an affidavit attesting to the ownership of five enslaved Africans. Their names were recorded as John Caldwell, born 1800; Richard Caldwell, born 1810; Lannia Caldwell, born 1803; Mildred Caldwell, born 1806; and Betsy Gatewood, born 1815. This affidavit appears in the Buffalo Town Proceedings, p. 93, in the collection of the Buffalo History Museum.

=== Legacy ===
Fort Porter, Porter Avenue in Buffalo, Porter Road (NY 182) in Niagara Falls, and the town of Porter in Niagara County are all named in honor of Gen. Porter. Porter's letters and papers survive in the library collections of the Buffalo History Museum.

Porter Hall at Buffalo State College was named after Gen. Porter in 1980 but changed to Bengal Hall in July 2020 due to Porter's slave ownership. Similarly, Porter Quadrangle within the Ellicott Complex at the University at Buffalo was named after Porter in 1974 but his name was removed in August 2020 due to Porter's slave ownership.

In 1834, a paddle steamer named the General Porter was launched, on Lake Erie. She sailed out of Buffalo, New York, until 1838, when she was sold to the Royal Navy, which renamed her HMS Toronto. The Royal Navy employed her patrolling Lake Erie, the St Clair River, and the upper Niagara River.

U.S. House of Representatives
Preceded by William Kirkpatrick	Member of the U.S. House of Representatives from New York's 15th congressional district 1809–1813	Succeeded by John M. Bowers, Joel Thompson
Preceded by Samuel M. Hopkins, Nathaniel W. Howell	Member of the U.S. House of Representatives from New York's 21st congressional district 1815–1816 with Micah Brooks	Succeeded by Archibald S. Clarke, Micah Brooks
Political offices
Preceded by Jacob R. Van Rensselaer	Secretary of State of New York; 1815–1816	Succeeded by Robert L. Tillotson
Preceded by James Barbour	U.S. Secretary of War; Served under: John Quincy Adams; 1828–1829	Succeeded by John Henry Eaton
