= Peter B. Porter Jr. =

American politician (1806–1871)

Speaker of the House New York Assembly
- In office January l, 1841 – December 31, 1841
- Preceded by: George Washington Patterson
- Succeeded by: Levi S. Chatfield

Assemblyman New York Assembly
- In office January l, 1838 – December 31, 1841
- Preceded by: Hiram McNeil
- Succeeded by: Thomas T. Flagler

Personal details
- Born: May 7, 1806 Salisbury; Litchfield County, Connecticut
- Died: 1871
- Party: Whig
- Relations: Peter Buell Porter (uncle)
- Parent(s): Augustus Porter; Jane Howell
- Education: Hamilton College
- Profession: Lawyer, politician

Peter Buell Porter (May 7, 1806 – 1871) was an American lawyer and politician from New York. He was Assemblyman and Speaker of the New York State Assembly in 1841.

== Biography ==
Peter Buell Porter was born on May 7, 1806, in Salisbury, Connecticut, to Augustus Porter (1769–1849), and his second wife Jane Howell. His uncle, and namesake, was Peter Buell Porter (1773–1844), the United States Secretary of War under John Quincy Adams. The month after his birth, his family moved to Niagara Falls, New York. He graduated from Hamilton College. Then he studied law, was admitted to the bar and practiced in Buffalo, New York.

Elected as a Whig, Porter was a member from Niagara County of the New York State Assembly from January 1, 1838, to December 31, 1841, and was Speaker in 1841. In 1852, he was a vice president of the committee that organized the celebration of the anniversary of the Battle of Lundy's Lane, and was a director of the Buffalo and Niagara Falls Railroad.

Porter died in 1871.

Political offices
Preceded by George Washington Patterson	Speaker of the New York State Assembly; 1841	Succeeded by Levi S. Chatfield
