= 1821 United States House of Representatives elections in New York =

United States House of Representatives elections in New York, 1821
- April 28–30, 1821

All 27 New York seats to the United States House of Representatives
	Majority party	Minority party
Party	Democratic-Republican	Federalist
Last election	21	6
Seats won	19	8
Seat change	▼2	▲2

The 1821 United States House of Representatives elections in New York were held from April 24 to 26, 1821, to elect 27 U.S. Representatives to represent the State of New York in the United States House of Representatives of the 17th United States Congress.

== Background ==
27 U.S. Representatives had been elected in April 1818 to a term in the 16th United States Congress beginning on March 4, 1819, and ending on March 3, 1821. The previous congressional elections were held usually in even-numbered years, about ten months before the term would start on March 4 of the next year, and about a year and a half before Congress actually met in the following December. This time the congressional elections were moved a year forward, and were held together with the State elections in late April 1821, after the congressional term already had begun, but about half a year before Congress actually met on December 3, 1821.

== Congressional districts ==
Except for the split of the 21st District, the geographical area of the congressional districts remained the same as at the previous elections in 1818. Five new counties had been created. Hamilton Co. was split from Montgomery Co. inside the 14th District. Oswego Co. was created from parts of Oneida and Onondaga counties, but the parts remained in their previous congressional districts. On March 9, 1821, the New York State Legislature divided the 21st District in two districts: Ontario Co. and the newly created Monroe Co. remained as the 21st District; the remainder became the new 22nd District, including the new counties of Erie and Livingston.

- The 1st District (two seats) comprising the 1st and 2nd Ward of New York County, and Kings, Queens, Suffolk and Richmond counties.
- The 2nd District (two seats) comprising the other eight wards of New York County.
- The 3rd District comprising Westchester and Rockland counties.
- The 4th District comprising Dutchess County, except the towns of Rhinebeck and Clinton; and Putnam County.
- The 5th District comprising Columbia County; and Rhinebeck and Clinton in Dutchess County.
- The 6th District comprising Orange County.
- The 7th District comprising Ulster and Sullivan counties.
- The 8th District comprising Delaware and Greene counties.
- The 9th District comprising Albany County.
- The 10h District comprising Rensselaer County.
- The 11th District comprising Saratoga County.
- The 12th District (two seats) comprising Clinton, Essex, Franklin, Washington and Warren counties.
- The 13th District comprising Schenectady and Schoharie counties.
- The 14th District comprising Montgomery County and the Town of Danube in Herkimer County.
- The 15th District (two seats) comprising Chenango, Broome and Otsego counties.
- The 16th District comprising Oneida County and the ex-Oneida part of Oswego County.
- The 17th District comprising Herkimer County, except the Town of Danube; and Madison County.
- The 18th District comprising St. Lawrence, Jefferson and Lewis counties.
- The 19th District comprising Onondaga and Cortland counties, and the ex-Onondaga part of Oswego County.
- The 20th District (two seats) comprising Tioga, Steuben, Cayuga, Seneca and Tompkins counties.
- The 21st District comprising Ontario and Monroe counties.
- The 22nd District comprising Genesee, Allegany, Niagara, Chautauqua, Cattaraugus, Erie and Livingston counties.

Note: There are now 62 counties in the State of New York. The counties which are not mentioned in this list had not yet been established, or sufficiently organized, the area being included in one or more of the abovementioned counties.

== Result ==
15 Bucktails and 12 Clintonian/Federalists were declared elected. Cadwallader D. Colden (Fed.) successfully contested the election of Peter Sharpe (Buckt.), so that New York was represented by 19 Democratic-Republicans and 8 Federalists in the 17th Congress. The incumbents Wood, Van Rensselaer, Dickinson, Taylor, Pitcher and Tracy were re-elected; the incumbents Gross, Monell, Hall, Richmond and Allen (all Clintonians) were defeated.

1821 United States House election result
District	Democratic-Republican/Bucktails		Clintonian/Federalist		also ran	
1st	Joshua Smith	3,326	Silas Wood	3,960	"Cadwallader Colden"	395
1st	Peter Sharpe	3,369	Cadwallader D. Colden	3,339	"Cadwallader D. Colder"	220
2nd	John J. Morgan	6,645	Henry Eckford	2,813		
2nd	Churchill C. Cambreleng	3,975				
3rd	Jeremiah H. Pierson	1,863	John T. Smith	1,330	Peter S. Van Orden (Buckt.)	331
4th	William W. Van Wyck	2,795	William Taber	2,125		
5th	Philip J. Schuyler	2,523	Walter Patterson	3,467		
6th	Selah Tuthill	2,156	James W. Wilkin	1,340		
7th	William G. Gillespie	2,139	Charles H. Ruggles	2,577		
8th	Jacob Haight	1,812	Richard McCarty	2,592		
9th	Harmanus Bleecker	1,793	Solomon Van Rensselaer	2,393		
10th	James L. Hogeboom	2,181	John D. Dickinson	2,852	Simon Newcomb	102
11th	Guert Van Schoonhoven	2,044	John W. Taylor	2,346		
12th	Reuben H. Walworth	5,300	John Crary	4,451		
12th	Nathaniel Pitcher	4,951	Ezra C. Gross	4,264		
13th	William Mann	2,229	John Gebhard	2,321		
14th	John Herkimer	2,426	Alfred Conkling	2,672		
15th	James Hawkes	5,363	Robert Monell	4,188		
15th	Samuel Campbell	5,222	Alvan Stewart	4,036		
16th	Nathan Williams	2,774	Joseph Kirkland	3,608		
17th	Thomas H. Hubbard	3,235	David Woods	3,103		
18th	Perley Keyes	3,228	Micah Sterling	3,568		
19th	Elisha Litchfield	3,208	George Hall	3,032		
20th	William B. Rochester	7,562	Jonathan Richmond	6,104		
20th	David Woodcock	6,306	Herman Camp	5,579		
21st	Elijah Spencer	4,798	Nathaniel Allen	4,692	Daniel W. Lewis (Clintonian/Republican)	160
22nd	Benjamin Ellicott	6,789	Albert H. Tracy	7,020		

Note: It is difficult to ascertain the party affiliation of some of the fusion candidates: At this time the Democratic-Republican Party was already split into two opposing factions: on one side, the supporters of DeWitt Clinton and his Erie Canal project; on the other side, the Bucktails (including the Tammany Hall organization in New York City), led by Martin Van Buren. At the same time, the Federalist Party had already begun to disintegrate, and many of its former members joined either the Bucktails or the Clintonians. However, in Congress both Bucktails and Clintonians aligned with the Democratic-Republicans from the other States. Wood, Colden, Patterson, Ruggles, Van Rensselaer, Dickinson, Kirkland and Sterling were Federalists; Wilkin, McCarty, Taylor, Gross, Gebhard, Monell, Hall, Richmond, Camp, Allen and Tracy were Clintonians.

== Aftermath, special elections and contested election ==
Selah Tuthill, elected in the 6th District, died on September 7, 1821, before Congress met. A special election to fill the vacancy was held from November 6 to 8, and was won by Charles Borland, Jr.

1821 United States House special election result
District	Democratic-Republican		Democratic-Republican	
6th	Charles Borland, Jr.	1,277	John Duer	1,097

The House of Representatives of the 17th United States Congress met for the first time at the United States Capitol in Washington, D.C., on December 3, 1821, and 24 of the representatives took their seats. Ruggles and Sterling took their seats later, and Peter Sharpe did not appear.

On December 6, 1821, a petition on behalf of Cadwallader D. Colden was presented to contest the election of Peter Sharpe in the 1st District. On December 11, the Committee on Elections submitted its report. They found that in the town of Brookhaven 220 votes had been returned for Cadwallader D. Colden, but the final letter of the name "n" had been misread as an "r" when the election certificate was viewed in the office of the Secretary of State of New York. They also found that in the town of Hempstead 395 votes were returned for "Cadwallader Colden" by mistake, the Queens County Clerk having omitted the middle initial although all these votes had in fact been given for "Cadwallader D. Colden". The Secretary of State of New York, receiving the abovementioned result, issued credentials for Sharpe who never took or claimed the seat. On December 12, the House declared Colden entitled to the seat, and he took it.

On January 14, 1822, Solomon Van Rensselaer resigned his seat to accept an appointment as Postmaster of Albany to replace Solomon Southwick whose financial affairs were in such a messy state that he had defaulted the post-office monies. To fill the vacancy, a special election was held from February 25 to 27, and was won by Stephen Van Rensselaer defeating Ex-Postmaster Southwick. Stephen Van Rensselaer took his seat on March 12, 1822.

1822 United States House special election result
District	Clintonian/Federalist		Democratic-Republican	
9th	Stephen Van Rensselaer	2,266	Solomon Southwick	499

== Sources ==
- The New York Civil List compiled in 1858 (see: pg. 66 for district apportionment; pg. 71 for Congressmen)
- Members of the Seventeenth United States Congress
- Election result 1st D. at project "A New Nation Votes", compiled by Phil Lampi, hosted by Tufts University Digital Library [gives 3,961 for Wood; 3,958 for Colden; 3,369 for Sharpe; and 3,326 for Smith; the newspaper editor was not aware of the county clerks mistakes]
- Election result 2nd D. at "A New Nation Votes"
- Election result 3rd D. at "A New Nation Votes"
- Election result 4th D. at "A New Nation Votes"
- Election result 5th D. at "A New Nation Votes"
- Election result 6th D. at "A New Nation Votes"
- Election result 7th D. at "A New Nation Votes"
- Election result 8th D. at "A New Nation Votes"
- Election result 9th D. at "A New Nation Votes"
- Election result 10th D. at "A New Nation Votes"
- Election result 11th D. at "A New Nation Votes"
- Election result 12th D. at "A New Nation Votes"
- Election result 13th D. at "A New Nation Votes"
- Election result 14th D. at "A New Nation Votes"
- Election result 15th D. at "A New Nation Votes"
- Election result 16th D. at "A New Nation Votes"
- Election result 17th D. at "A New Nation Votes"
- Election result 18th D. at "A New Nation Votes"
- Election result 19th D. at "A New Nation Votes"
- Election result 20th D. at "A New Nation Votes"
- Election result 21st D. at "A New Nation Votes"
- Election result 22nd D. at "A New Nation Votes"
- Special election result 6th D. at "A New Nation Votes"
- 1822 Special election result 9th D. at "A New Nation Votes"
