= 1813 New York's 15th congressional district special election =

A special election was held in New York's 15th congressional district to fill a vacancy left by the death of Representative-elect William Dowse (F) on February 18, 1813, before the beginning of the 13th Congress. The election was held April 27–29, 1813.

== Election results ==
The initial results were as follows:

Candidate	Party	Votes	Percent
John M. Bowers	Federalist	4,287	48.3%
Isaac Williams, Jr.	Democratic-Republican	4,129	46.6%
"Isaac Williams"		434	4.9%
"John M. Boweys"		1	0.01%
Others		17	0.2%

Bowers was declared the winner of the special election

== Election challenge ==
Williams subsequently challenged Bowers' election on the ground that the votes for "Isaac Williams" were intended for himself. The House Committee on Elections investigated this election and found that there were three individuals in the 15th district with the name Isaac Williams, one of whom used the suffix "Jr.". Both contestants admitted that the only candidates in the election were Isaac Williams, Jr. and John M. Bowers. On July 2, The Committee ruled that Williams appeared to be entitled to the seat, but that further investigation was required, and postponed further discussion to the first Wednesday of the 2nd session.

On December 16, 1813, the committee made a final report determining that in the towns of Exeter, Milford, and Westford, 322 votes which were, in fact, cast for Isaac Williams, Jr. were mistakenly reported as Isaac Williams. The Committee ruled that those 322 votes were thus to be added to Isaac Williams, Jr.'s votes, creating a final tally as follows:

Candidate	Party	Votes	Percent
Isaac Williams, Jr.	Democratic-Republican	4,451	50.2%
John M. Bowers	Federalist	4,287	48.3%
"Isaac Williams"		112	1.3%
"John M. Boweys"		1	0.01%
Others		17	0.2%

Williams was thus ruled by the committee to be the legitimate occupant of that seat. The House accepted their ruling unanimously, and Williams took his seat January 24, 1814

== See also ==
- List of special elections to the United States House of Representatives
