= Laurence H. Snyder =

American physician (1901–1986)

Laurence Hasbrouck Snyder
- Born: July 23, 1901; Kingston, New York
- Died: October 8, 1986
- Education: Rutgers University, Harvard University
- Occupation: Physician

Laurence Hasbrouck Snyder (July 23, 1901 – October 8, 1986) was a pioneer in human genetics and president of the University of Hawaii.

Snyder was born in Kingston, New York, the second of five children of DeWitt Clinton Snyder (1859-1919) and his wife Gertrude Louisa Wood Snyder (1869-1961). His parents were Christian missionaries who had lived in the Belgian Congo. He was a descendant of the Hasbrouck family and of Louis DuBois. His first cousin twice removed was politician William Lounsbery.

Graduating from Rutgers University in 1922 with a B.S. degree, he received a doctor of science degree from Harvard University in 1926.

Snyder taught at four academic institutions, all state universities: North Carolina State College (1924-1930) as professor of biology, Ohio State University (1930-1947) as professor of genetics and later chairman of the Department of Zoology and Entomology, the University of Oklahoma (1947-1958) as Dean of the graduate college and professor of medicine, and the University of Hawaii (1958-1963) as President and later professor and professor emeritus.

At the University of Hawaii, Snyder presided over an expansion of 37 new buildings and a doubling of enrollment. He was particularly proud of the beautiful mall, shaded by monkeypod trees, stretching from Varney Circle to East West Center Road.

In 1961, Snyder attempted to terminate the university's intercollegiate football program, believing it to be incompatible with the university's academic mission. However, after alumni protests, the decision was reversed.

Snyder received three honorary degrees. He served terms as president of the Genetics Society of America, of the American Association for the Advancement of Science, and of the American Society of Human Genetics.

== Biography/Career ==
Laurence Hasbrouck Snyder was born on July 23, 1901. Born in Kingston NY, Snyder’s parents, DeWitt Clinton Snyder and Gertrude Wood Snyder conceived him in Africa, where they worked as Christian medical missionaries. During their time there, Snyder’s mother showed symptoms of hemoglobinuric fever, forcing them to return to the United States and end their missionary. Dewitt and Gertrude Snyder were of English and Dutch ancestry. Snyder spent his childhood in Staten Island, spending a lot of time in the woods, fields, and lakes. This inspired a deep interest in wildlife, particularly in birds. Later, in 1928, Snyder published an illustrated booklet, “Common Birds of North Carolina Farms, Gardens and Orchards”, studying birds in Raleigh, North Carolina. Snyder also researched on bird songs. Snyder attended Curtis High School in New York and was later accepted into Rutgers University . In 1922, he completed his bachelor of science degree at Rutgers, graduated, and entered the Graduate School of Harvard University, where he completed his doctor of science degree in 1926. After graduating from Rutgers, Snyder married Guldborg M. Herland in 1923. Herland was born and raised in Norway, but had been living in Staten Island at the time. By 1980, Snyder and Herland had 2 daughters, 9 grandchildren, and 10 great-grandchildren.

Before 1958, Snyder worked at several universities: as a professor in biology at North Carolina State College, a professor of medicine and genetics at Ohio State University, chair of Department of Zoology and Entomology as well as the graduate dean and professor of medicine at the University of Oklahoma. Throughout his lifetime, Snyder received a plethora of honors and awards, some of which include: election into 18 honorary societies, national president of Phi Sigma from 1953 to 1963, honorary degrees from Sc.D., Rutgers, 1947; Sc.D., Ohio State, 1960; and L.H.D., North Carolina State 1962. During his tenure at the University of Oklahoma, Snyder made a stand against segregation in Oklahoma, denouncing the Oklahoma chapter of the AAUP. Snyder also became the president of the University of Hawaii from 1958-1963. By that time, he had already become a world-renowned geneticist [3]. During his time there, he published 3 books, more than 150 articles, and gave over a thousand lectures both at the school and abroad. His work included developing the science of medical genetics from its beginning to the present day, influencing the development of modern day DNA technology. Currently on the University of Hawaii campus is a major building named Snyder Hall, housing research contributing the medical field.

Snyder is also credited with collaborating with other countries to bring together the East and West. For example, during his tenure as the president of the University of Hawaii, the internationally famed East-West Center was established in 1960 and was funded by the U.S. Department of State. In 1961, as president of the 10th Pacific Science Congress, which congregated in the East-West Center that year, Snyder gave the presidential address to 60 countries represented by 2054 delegates. His address was named, “The Wheel Has Come Full Circle”. It became so acclaimed, it was published in both the Proceedings of the Congress, and even the Journal of the Philippine Federation of Private Medical Practitioners. Snyder also gave other lectures, such as one in 1960 in Japan during the invitational symposium on “Science and Civilization”. At the symposium, Snyder was one of three American scientists invited as well as three other Japanese philosophers. His talk there, entitled, “Human Individuality in Modern Civilization” also became so renowned that it appeared in official Japanese proceedings in both English and Japanese. In addition to Japan, Snyder visited and spoke in the Philippines (in over twenty Universities), Hong Kong, Okinawa, Taiwan, Thailand, and India. These visits and meetings with government officials from Pacific countries sparked interest and enthusiasm for the East-West Center and for a stronger relationship between the East and West.

Once retired, Snyder went back to teaching classes for medical students and local physicians. By this time, Snyder needed to update his knowledge of new findings in DNA chemistry, protein chemistry, and metabolic pathways. Snyder later finally settled in Hawaii before his death in 1986.

== Scientific and medical contributions ==
Snyder's major contributions to genetics and the genetic approach to medicine could be viewed through three main domains: (1) utilizing genetics to identify and treat diseases; (2) integrating concepts of genetics and heredity in scientific and medical understanding; (3) advocating for the idea of preventive genetic medicine in a bid to eliminate illnesses that result from heritable unfavorable genes. Snyder's contributions also track a shift in his academic focus from racialized aspects of population genetics in the 1920s to genetic and medical concerns more centered around the individual in the 1940s and 50s.

Snyder's research, between 1926 and 1949, was reported in a series of 35 papers with the overall title, "Studies in Human Inheritance". These range over subjects that include blood groups, polydactylism, hemophilia, baldness, sex ratios, Rh incompatibility, and other topics. Perhaps his most remembered work is his study of phenylthiocarbamide, a chemical that tastes bitter to some individuals but is without taste to others, depending on the inheritance of a single gene.

=== Blood group genetics ===
In the early 1920s, the debate over the ABO blood group emerged with great enthusiasm in the scientific arena. Polish bacteriologist Ludwik Hirszfeld and his wife, pediatrician Hanna Hirszfeld, proposed in 1919 that blood groups were a result of two independent genetic loci, an A gene and a separate B gene. However, in 1924, German mathematician Felix Bernstein introduced a triple-allele hypothesis, contending that population data fit better with a single blood-group gene with three alleles, A, B, O, as we know of now.

This occurred during the time when Snyder was relocating to North Carolina for his assistant professorship at North Carolina State College in Raleigh. He was two years away from his doctorate and was in the midst of choosing a dissertation topic. This problem of blood group typing appealed to him and he found that Bernstein's theory explained the discrepancies Snyder had found between the results of his own research at the time and Hirszfeld's theory. In 1925, Snyder published his thesis in the American Journal of Physical Anthropology, applying the triple-allele hypothesis to type humans based on racial groups. Collaborating with American physician William Allan, Snyder drew blood from North Carolina Cherokee Indians and quantitatively analyzed blood-group proportions among the various racial hybrids within this population. Through this, he developed a theory of classifying races based on the relative proportion of different blood groups in different populations. He characterized humans as six races: European, Hunan, Indomanchurian, Africo-Malaysian, Pacific-American, and Australian, with these races having radiated from a single human origin. Although Snyder's work was racialized, he was mainly seeking to use science and genetics to trace the origins of human races, and never viewed the human race as composed of multiple species.

Snyder continued to apply genetics to solve medical problems, recognizing the medical impact of blood typing in not only race classification, but also blood transfusions and paternity tests. To emphasize the utility of blood typing not just in anthropology but also in medicine, Snyder expanded these ideas in his book Blood Grouping in Relation to Clinical and Legal Medicine.

=== Testing of heritable conditions ===
In the 1920s, there were only six clearly defined human traits whose genetics were well studied: the ABO blood group, the MN blood type, eye color, the direction of the whorl of hair at the back of the head, the presence of hair on the second joint of fingers and toes, and the dominant form of migraine discovered by William Allan. Snyder discovered a seventh in 1931, and developed the first genetic test for a trait.

For most people, phenylthiocarbamide (PTC) tastes really bitter, but to a significant fraction of the population, the taste is entirely undetectable. Snyder was interested in confirming whether the ability to taste PTC is a Mendelian trait and sought to understand the biological and genetic nature of this trait. In his research, Snyder collected data from 800 families with 2,843 children to cover sufficient ground on the possible genetic combinations of this allele. He found that the gene PTC is associated with acted like a classic dominant, and both alleles (the taster and non-taster ones) are common.

To test for the presence of the PTC taster allele, Snyder found a simple, cost-effective and convenient way of soaking a slip of paper in a solution containing PTC and letting the paper dry. This technique opened new ground for Snyder and other geneticists to test patients with other heritable conditions for PTC sensitivity, in hope of finding linkage groups: the presence of two genes sufficiently close to each other on a chromosome such that the inheritance of one trait indicates a high probability of inheriting the other. Snyder's findings on identifying heritable diseases was another significant contribution to the clinical applications of genetics.

=== Professionalization of medical genetics ===
The reason why Snyder is the founding father of American genetics is not that much due to his numerous intellectual accolades, but his contributions to the professionalization of human and medical genetics.

During the 1930s and 40s, when Snyder was at Ohio State University, he developed and designed the first required course in medical genetics for medical students in America. He also taught this course at Duke, North Carolina and Wake Forest medical schools, and at the University of Oklahoma and to practicing physicians in Honolulu when he was at the University of Hawaii. In 1935, Snyder published his own textbook, The Principles of Heredity, which had five editions and was widely used in genetics courses. Snyder went on to establish four medical genetics programs on his own and was directly involved in the founding of at least two others. He was also a founder of the first professional society in medical genetics in 1948.

As observed recurring in his writing, Snyder advocated that doctors should learn about genetics due to six reasons: (1) genetics could aid in diagnosis; (2) it could elucidate ways to prevent people from suffering from genetic disease; (3) it could be useful when there are legal implications, such as during cases of disputed paternity; (4) it plays a role in genetic counseling for marriage and (5) pregnancy; (6) genetics is also the basis for eugenic and euthenics programs, "for the protection of society."

=== Eugenics ===
Snyder strongly believed that genetics hold great medical benefit in terms of the prevention of disease, through reducing the incidence of hereditary illness or even eliminating them altogether. He felt that "feeble-mindedness" was "probably the outstanding problem in eugenics," contending throughout the final chapter of his textbook, The Principles of Heredity, that segregation and sterilization were necessary eugenic measures to ensure that the biological inequality leading to physical and mental deficiencies were curbed.
