= James Birdsall =

American politician

Member of the New York State Assembly from the Chenango County district
- In office January 1, 1827 – December 31, 1827
- Preceded by: John C. Clark
- Succeeded by: Tilly Lynde

Member of the U.S. House of Representatives from New York's 15th district
- In office March 4, 1815 – March 3, 1817
- Preceded by: Isaac Williams, Jr., Joel Thompson
- Succeeded by: Isaac Williams, Jr., John R. Drake

Personal details
- Born: 1783 New York State, US
- Died: July 20, 1856 (aged 72–73) Flint, Michigan, US
- Party: Democratic-Republican Party
- Spouse: Rizpah Steere Birdsall
- Children: 3
- Profession: lawyer; politician

James Birdsall (1783 – July 20, 1856) was an American politician and a U.S. representative from New York.

== Biography ==
Born in 1783 in New York State, Birdsall studied law and was admitted to the bar in 1806. He married Rizpah Steere, and they had two sons and a daughter.

== Career ==
Birdsall was the first lawyer to settle in Norwich, New York and became surrogate of Chenango County, New York in 1811.

Elected as a Democratic-Republican to the Fourteenth Congress, Birdsall was United States Representative for the fifteenth district of New York from March 4, 1815, to March 3, 1817.

A member of the New York State Assembly (Chenango County) in 1827, Birdsall was also one of the incorporators of the Bank of Chenango. He moved to Fenton, Michigan, in 1839 and later to Flint, Michigan.

== Death ==
Birdsall died in Flint, Genesee County, Michigan, on July 20, 1856 (age about 73 years). He is interred at Glenwood Cemetery, in Flint Michigan.

New York State Assembly
Preceded by John C. Clark	New York State Assembly; Chenango County; 1827	Succeeded by Tilly Lynde
U.S. House of Representatives
Preceded by Isaac Williams, Jr., Joel Thompson	Member of the U.S. House of Representatives from New York's 15th congressional district March 4, 1815 – March 3, 1817 with Jabez D. Hammond	Succeeded by Isaac Williams, Jr., John R. Drake
