= Joseph S. Lyman =

American politician

Member of the U.S. House of Representatives from New York's 15th district
- In office March 4, 1819 – March 3, 1821
- Preceded by: John R. Drake; Isaac Williams, Jr.
- Succeeded by: Samuel Campbell; James Hawkes

Personal details
- Born: February 14, 1785 Northfield, Massachusetts, USA
- Died: March 21, 1821 (aged 36) Cooperstown, New York, USA
- Resting place: Federal Street Cemetery, Greenfield, Massachusetts
- Party: Democratic-Republican

Joseph Stebbins Lyman (February 14, 1785 – March 21, 1821) was a U.S. representative from New York.

Born in Northfield, Massachusetts, Lyman attended the common schools. He graduated from Dartmouth College, Hanover, New Hampshire, in 1806. He then studied law and was admitted to the bar and commenced practice in Cooperstown, New York. Lyman was elected as a Democratic-Republican to the Sixteenth Congress (March 4, 1819 – March 3, 1821). He was not a candidate for renomination in 1821. He died in Cooperstown, March 21, 1821. He was interred in Greenfield, Massachusetts.

== Sources ==
- United States Congress. "Joseph S. Lyman (id: L000527)". Biographical Directory of the United States Congress.

U.S. House of Representatives
Preceded by John R. Drake, Isaac Williams, Jr.	Member of the U.S. House of Representatives from New York's 15th congressional district 1819–1821 with Robert Monell	Succeeded by Samuel Campbell, James Hawkes
