= Sidney Lawrence =

American politician

Sidney Lawrence (December 31, 1801 – May 9, 1892) was an American lawyer who served one term as a U.S. representative from New York from 1847 to 1849.

== Biography ==
Born in Weybridge, Vermont, Lawrence moved with his parents to Moira, New York, in early childhood. He attended the common schools. He studied law. He was admitted to the bar and commenced practice in Moira, New York.

He was Justice of the Peace for more than half a century. He served as supervisor and as assessor. Surrogate of Franklin County 1837–1843. He was a member of the New York State Senate (4th D.) in 1843 and 1844. He served as member of the State assembly in 1846.

=== Congress ===
Lawrence was elected as a Democrat to the 30th United States Congress, holding office from March 4, 1847, to March 3, 1849.

=== Later career and death ===
Afterwards he resumed the practice of law. He also engaged in the real estate business and in banking. He died in Moira, New York, May 9, 1892. He was interred in Moira Cemetery.

== Sources ==
- United States Congress. "Sidney Lawrence (id: L000139)". Biographical Directory of the United States Congress.

New York State Senate
Preceded by John W. Taylor	New York State Senate; Fourth District (Class 2); 1843–1844	Succeeded by Augustus C. Hand
U.S. House of Representatives
Preceded by Joseph Russell	Member of the U.S. House of Representatives from New York's 15th congressional district 1847–1849	Succeeded by John R. Thurman
