= William Lounsbery =

American politician

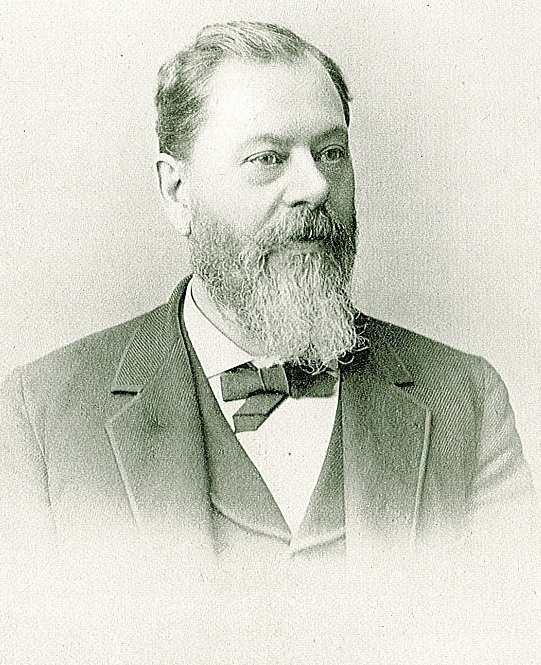

Member of the U.S. House of Representatives from New York's 15th district
- In office March 4, 1879 – March 3, 1881
- Preceded by: Stephen L. Mayham
- Succeeded by: Thomas Cornell

Personal details
- Born: December 25, 1831 Stone Ridge, New York, U.S.
- Died: November 8, 1905 (aged 73) Kingston, New York, U.S.
- Resting place: Wiltwyck Rural Cemetery

William Lounsbery (December 25, 1831 – November 8, 1905) was an American lawyer, Civil War veteran, and politician who served one term as a U.S. representative from New York from 1879 to 1881.

== Biography ==
Born at Stone Ridge, New York, he was the son of John (1803-1864) and Sarah Peters Lounsbery (1796-1866). He was a descendant of New Paltz founder and Huguenot Louis DuBois and the Hasbrouck family.

Lounsbery was graduated from Rutgers College, New Brunswick, New Jersey, in 1851. He attended the law department of the New York University in Albany, New York. He was admitted to the bar in 1853 and engaged in practice. During the Civil War was commissary of the Twentieth Regiment, New York Militia, with the rank of first lieutenant, during its three months' service.

=== Political career ===
He was member of the New York State Assembly (Ulster Co., 1st D.) in 1868. He served as the second mayor of Kingston, New York 1878–1879.

Lounsbery was elected as a Democrat to the Forty-sixth Congress (March 4, 1879 – March 3, 1881).

=== Death ===
He died in Kingston, New York, November 8, 1905.

He was interred in the Wiltwyck Rural Cemetery.

== Legacy ==
Lounsbery Place in Kingston is named after him.

=== Family ===
Physician Laurence H. Snyder is a first cousin twice removed of Lounsbery, and he is also a cousin of Abraham Bruyn Hasbrouck and Abraham J. Hasbrouck.

== See also ==
- List of mayors of Kingston, New York

== Sources ==
- United States Congress. "William Lounsbery (id: L000452)". Biographical Directory of the United States Congress.

New York State Assembly
Preceded by John Maxwell	New York State Assembly; Ulster County, 1st District; 1868	Succeeded by Patrick J. Flynn
U.S. House of Representatives
Preceded by Stephen L. Mayham	Member of the U.S. House of Representatives from New York's 15th congressional district 1879–1881	Succeeded by Thomas Cornell
