= Joel Thompson (politician) =

American politician

Member of the U.S. House of Representatives from New York's 15th district
- In office March 4, 1813 – March 4, 1815
- Preceded by: Peter B. Porter
- Succeeded by: James Birdsall; Jabez D. Hammond

Member of the New York State Assembly
- In office 1803–1804; 1798

Personal details
- Born: October 3, 1760 Stanford, Province of New York, British America
- Died: February 8, 1843 (aged 82) Brooklyn, New York, U.S.
- Resting place: Green-Wood Cemetery
- Party: Federalist

Military service
- Branch/service: Continental Army
- Years of service: 1779–1780
- Battles/wars: American Revolutionary War

Joel Thompson (October 3, 1760 – February 8, 1843) was an American politician and attorney who served as a United States representative from New York.

== Early life and education ==
Born in Stanford in the Province of New York, he attended the common schools in Smyrna. He studied law, was admitted to the bar and practiced in Duanesburg and Sherburne.

== Career ==
He served in the Continental Army in 1779 and 1780 and was a member of the New York State Assembly in 1798, 1803, and 1804, serving one term as member from Albany County and two terms as a member from Chenango County, New York. He was assistant justice of the court of common pleas of Chenango County from July 1799 to June 1807, when he became judge of Chenango County, serving until March 16, 1814.

Thompson was elected as a Federalist to the 13th United States Congress, holding office from March 4, 1813 to March 3, 1815. He resumed the practice of law in Sherburne, New York.

== Death ==
In 1843, Thompson died in Brooklyn. He was interred in Green-Wood Cemetery.

U.S. House of Representatives
Preceded by Peter B. Porter	Member of the U.S. House of Representatives from New York's 15th congressional district 1813–1815 with John M. Bowers 1813, and Isaac Williams, Jr. 1814–1815	Succeeded by James Birdsall, Jabez D. Hammond
