= Eli Perry =

American businessman and politician from New York

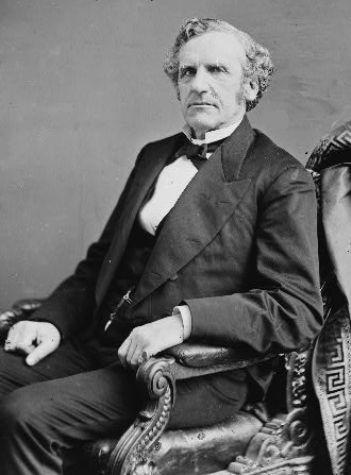
- Brady–Handy Collection, Library of Congress, circa 1871

Member of the United States House of Representatives from New York
- In office March 4, 1871 – March 3, 1875
- Preceded by: Stephen L. Mayham
- Succeeded by: John H. Bagley Jr.
- Constituency: 14th district (1871–73); 22nd district (1873–75)

Member of the New York State Assembly
- In office January 1, 1851 – December 31, 1851
- Preceded by: William S. Shepard
- Succeeded by: Robert Harper
- Constituency: Albany County 4th District

Mayor of Albany, New York
- In office 1862–1866
- Preceded by: George Hornell Thacher
- Succeeded by: George Hornell Thacher
- In office 1856–1860
- Preceded by: Charles Watson Godard
- Succeeded by: George Hornell Thacher
- In office 1851–1854
- Preceded by: Franklin Townsend
- Succeeded by: William Parmelee

Personal details
- Born: December 25, 1799 Cambridge, New York, U.S.
- Died: May 17, 1881 (aged 81) Albany, New York, U.S.
- Resting place: Albany Rural Cemetery, Menands, New York
- Party: Democratic
- Spouse(s): Eliza Clark; Lydia (Smith) Collin; Matilda Caroline Todd
- Children: 4
- Occupation: Businessman

Eli Perry (December 25, 1799 – May 17, 1881) was an American businessman from Albany, New York. He became wealthy as the operator of a successful meatpacking enterprise, and later invested in several other ventures. Perry was most notable for his service as a U.S. representative from New York, an office he held for two terms, 1871 to 1875.

A Democrat, he was a member of the New York State Assembly in 1851, and served as mayor of Albany from 1851 to 1854, 1856 to 1860, and 1862 to 1866.

== Early life ==
Eli Perry was born in Cambridge, New York on December 25, 1799, a son of John Perry and Jeannie (Searles) Perry. After his mother's death and father's remarriage, Perry's family moved from their Cambridge farm, first to a farm in Johnstown, then to Albany, where they owned and operated a tavern at the corner of what are now Washington Avenue and Swan Street. Eli Perry was educated in the local schools and assisted his family in operating the tavern.

During the War of 1812, John Perry obtained a contract to supply beef and other food to the United States Army. Eli Perry aided his father in fulfilling the contract, which gave him the knowledge and contacts to enter the business world on his own.

== Business career ==
After Perry's father completed the terms of his contract with the government, Perry obtained employment with Elisha Wilcox, who operated a tavern in a mansion that had been occupied by Daniel D. Tompkins when Tompkins served as governor of New York. In addition to helping support the family, Perry saved fourteen dollars over the course of the year he worked for Wilcox, which became the capital he used to start his own business.

Perry started a meatpacking venture by procuring use of the corner of a local grocery store, where he set up a butcher's stall. He then rented a local stable, which he used for slaughtering the cattle and sheep he purchased from local farmers. He began by buying, slaughtering, butchering, and selling locally one animal at a time. Perry eventually earned enough to buy a horse and wagon, which enabled him to expand his customer base by selling to homes and businesses in the towns surrounding Albany. As his business continued to grow, Perry was able to move to permanent quarters at the corner of Washington Avenue and Swan Street, near his father's tavern.

Recognizing that meatpacking would become an important industry as canals and railroads made it possible to transport food over longer distances, Perry continued to expand until he employed dozens of workers and processed more than 100 animals each day. Perry's profits continued to grow, and he began to invest in other ventures, including commercial real estate. In addition, he became a director of the Albany City Bank, Albany City Savings Bank, Albany Gaslight Company, Mutual Insurance Company of Albany, and Albany Savings Bank.

Perry also participated in Albany's civic life. He was president of the Emmanuel Baptist Church's board of trustees, and he made substantial donations to the church throughout his life. In addition, he served on the board of inspectors for the Albany Penitentiary. Perry also served as a member of the city's board of school commissioners for more than twenty years, and was a principal organizer of the city's first orphan asylum.

== Political career ==
Perry was active in politics as a Democrat. In 1845, he was elected to Albany's board of aldermen, and he served for two years. In 1850, he was elected to represent Albany in the New York State Assembly, and he served a one-year term in 1851.

In 1851, Perry was elected mayor of Albany and he served from 1851 to 1854. He returned to the mayor's office in 1856 and served until 1860. In 1862, he was elected mayor again, and he served until 1866.

Perry supported the Union during the American Civil War. During his third term as mayor, a strike by workers of the New York Central Railroad threatened the safety of the city and had the potential to delay or prevent delivery of troops and materiel to the front lines. Rather than respond with force, as many of Albany's business and civic leaders suggested, Perry personally visited the city's railyard to seek out the organizers of the strike. Perry informed the leaders that as mayor he was obligated to enforce the law and would employ force if necessary, and also gave his word that their concerns would be addressed if they dispersed. The railroad's workers and management came to agreement and the strike ended. At the final meeting of the striking workers, they passed resolutions of thanks to Perry for his efforts to mediate the dispute.

During the war, Perry was head of the city committee that supported the Union by organizing recruiting and fundraising efforts. He was one of the primary recruiters of Company B, 91st New York Infantry Regiment, which was commanded by Captain George W. Stackhouse, who had worked for Perry before the war. Perry also took part in recruiting and equipping the 43rd New York Infantry Regiment, and his visits to Virginia to ensure the soldiers' needs were being met caused the regiment's Company B to pass a resolution naming themselves the Perry Guards.

== Congressman ==
In 1870, Perry was a successful Democratic candidate for Congress. He was reelected in 1872 and served two terms, March 4, 1871 to March 3, 1875. Perry served in the 42nd and 43rd Congresses, and was a member of the Committee on Public Buildings and Grounds. During his Congressional service, Perry was active in obtaining benefits for Civil War veterans and pensions for widows of soldiers who had died during the war.

As a member of Congress, Perry also worked to obtain approval of a Washington, D.C. reform school for girls. His career in Congress culminated with approval of his bill to authorize construction of a new federal office building for Albany, which was constructed at the corner of Broadway and State Street.

== Later life ==
After his Congressional service, Perry returned to his Albany business interests.

== Death and burial ==
He died in Albany on May 17, 1881. Perry was buried at Albany Rural Cemetery.

In his will, Perry left bequests to numerous civic, religious, and charitable organizations. These included: (Note: $1,000 in 1881 is equal to approximately $27,200 in 2022.)

- $4,000 to the Emmanuel Baptist Church
- $1,000 to the Emmanuel Baptist Church's Sunday school
- $5,000 to the Albany Guardian Society and Home of the Friendless
- $1,000 to the Albany Hospital
- $1,000 to St. Peter's Hospital
- $1,000 to the Albany Baptist Missionary Union
- $10,000 to endow a professorship at the Rochester Theological Seminary
- One-fifth of the residue of his estate to endow a professorship at Hamilton Theological Seminary
- One-fifth to the Hudson River Baptist Association, North
- One fifth to the American Baptist Home Mission Society of New York City
- One-fifth to the American Baptist Union of Boston

The remaining one-fifth was used to provide personal bequests and satisfy other obligations.

== Family ==
Perry was married three times. His first wife was Eliza Clark. After her death, Perry was married to Lydia (Smith) Collin. After her death, Perry married Matilda Caroline Todd. With his first wife, Perry was the father of four children, son Oliver Hazard, who died at age 20, and three daughters who died in infancy.

Eli Perry was a third cousin of Commodore Oliver Hazard Perry.

== Notes ==
New York State Assembly
Preceded by William S. Shepard	New York State Assembly; Albany County, 4th District; 1851	Succeeded by Robert Harper
U.S. House of Representatives
Preceded by Stephen L. Mayham	Member of the U.S. House of Representatives from New York's 14th congressional district 1871–1873	Succeeded by David M. De Witt
Preceded by Joseph M. Warren	Member of the U.S. House of Representatives from New York's 15th congressional district 1873–1875	Succeeded by John H. Bagley Jr.
