= John R. Thurman =

American politician

John Richardson Thurman

Member of the U.S. House of Representatives from New York's 15th district
- In office March 4, 1849 – March 3, 1851
- Preceded by: Sidney Lawrence
- Succeeded by: Joseph Russell

Personal details
- Born: October 6, 1814 New York City, U.S.
- Died: July 24, 1854 (aged 39) Chestertown, New York, U.S.
- Resting place: Oakwood Cemetery, Troy, New York, U.S.
- Party: Whig

John Richardson Thurman (October 6, 1814 – July 24, 1854) was a U.S. representative from New York.

Born in New York City, Thurman graduated from Columbia University in 1835, where he was a member of the Philolexian Society. He moved to Chestertown, Warren County and engaged in agricultural pursuits. He was also involved in several businesses, including serving as a Director of the Sacket's Harbor and Saratoga Railroad. He also speculated in land, as evidenced by the fact that his widow and children sold some of their holdings to the Delaware and Hudson Railroad during its construction.

He held several local offices, including Associate Judge of the Warren County Court.

Thurman was elected as a Whig to the Thirty-first Congress (March 4, 1849 – March 3, 1851). He declined to be a candidate for renomination in 1850. After leaving Congress Thurman returned to managing his farm and other interests.

He died at his home near Friends Lake in Chestertown on July 24, 1854. He was originally interred in the family cemetery, before being reinterred in Oakwood Cemetery, Troy, New York.

== Sources ==
- United States Congress. "John R. Thurman (id: T000252)". Biographical Directory of the United States Congress.

U.S. House of Representatives
Preceded by Sidney Lawrence	Member of the U.S. House of Representatives from New York's 15th congressional district 1849–1851	Succeeded by Joseph Russell
