= Stephen L. Mayham =

American attorney and politician from New York

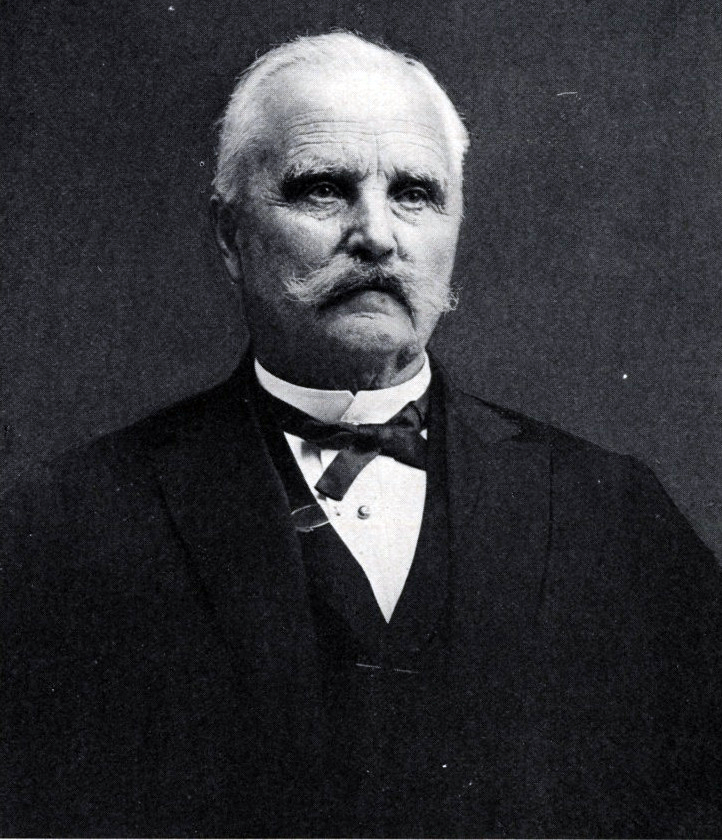

Justice of the New York Supreme Court for the Third Judicial Department
- In office January 3, 1887 – December 31, 1897
- Preceded by: Rufus W. Peckham
- Succeeded by: Emory A. Chase

Presiding Judge of the Schoharie County Court
- In office 1883–1887
- Preceded by: Charles Holmes
- Succeeded by: William C. Lamont

Member of the United States House of Representatives from New York
- In office March 4, 1877 – March 3, 1879
- Preceded by: John H. Bagley Jr.
- Succeeded by: William Lounsbery
- Constituency: 15th district
- In office March 4, 1869 – March 3, 1871
- Preceded by: John V. L. Pruyn
- Succeeded by: Eli Perry
- Constituency: 14th district

Member of the New York State Assembly from Schoharie County
- In office January 1, 1863 – December 31, 1863
- Preceded by: William Lamont
- Succeeded by: Peter P. Schoolcraft

District Attorney of Schoharie County, New York
- In office 1859–1862
- Preceded by: Nathan P. Hinman
- Succeeded by: William H. Young

Town Supervisor of Blenheim, New York
- In office 1858–1860
- Preceded by: Mathew Feder
- Succeeded by: Stephen L. Curtis

Personal details
- Born: October 8, 1826 Blenheim, New York, U.S.
- Died: March 3, 1908 (aged 81) Schoharie, New York, U.S.
- Resting place: St. Paul's Lutheran Cemetery, Schoharie, New York
- Party: Democratic
- Spouse: Julia A. Martin (m. 1849-1895, her death)
- Children: 5
- Profession: Attorney

Stephen Lorenzo Mayham (October 8, 1826 – March 3, 1908) was an attorney and politician from Schoharie County, New York, most notable for his service as a U.S. representative from New York and a justice of the New York Supreme Court.

== Early life ==
Stephen L. Mayham was born in Blenheim, New York on October 8, 1826, a son of John and Betsey (Ferguson) Mayham. Mayham was one of twelve children, eleven of whom survived to adulthood. His siblings included Thomas Friend Mayham, a physician who served as mayor of Fond du Lac, Wisconsin. Another brother, Jay Mayham, served as judge of the Fond du Lac County, Wisconsin court. Mayham's brother J. Banks Mayham served as mayor of Murphysboro, Illinois.

Mayham worked on his family's farm while attending the local schools. He obtained his teaching credentials, and at age eighteen began working a teacher in the district schools. In 1844 he began studying law at the Gilboa, New York Gilboa office of attorney Samuel W. Jackson, who later served as a justice of the New York Supreme Court. He completed his studies at the Ithaca, New York office of Samuel Love and George G. Freer, attained admission to the bar in 1848, and began to practice in Blenheim.

== Early career ==
A Democrat, Mayham served as Schoharie County's superintendent of schools from 1852 to 1857. From 1858 to 1860 he was Blenheim's town supervisor. From 1859 to 1862 he served as District Attorney of Schoharie County. In 1862, he moved to Schoharie, and in 1863, he served a one-year term in the New York State Assembly.

In 1868, Mayham was elected to the United States House of Representatives. He served in the 41st Congress, March 4, 1869 to March 3, 1871. During this term, he served on the Committee on Private Land Claims and the Committee on Expenditures of the State and Post Office Departments. In 1876 he was elected to the 45th Congress, March 4, 1877 to March 3, 1879. During this term, he was a member of the Committee on the District of Columbia and the Committee on State Department Expenditures.

== Later career ==
Mayham served as judge of the Schoharie County Court and the county surrogate court from 1883 to 1887. He was also a delegate to the Democratic National Conventions in 1884 and again in 1892. In 1886, Mayham was elected a justice of the New York Supreme Court, and he served until 1897. Mayham was president of Schoharie's board of education for eight years, and was the first president of the Schoharie Valley Railroad Company. After leaving the bench, he practiced law in partnership with his son Claude, and was often sought out to act as a referee for corporate and railroad litigation.

== Death and burial ==
Mayham died in Schoharie, New York on March 3, 1908. His body lays at St. Paul's Lutheran Cemetery in Schoharie.

== Family ==
In 1849, Mayham married Julia A. Martin (1829-1895). They were the parents of sons Matt F., Don S. and Claude B., and daughter Ida L.

New York State Assembly
Preceded by William Lamont	New York State Assembly; Schoharie County; 1863	Succeeded by Peter P. Schoolcraft
U.S. House of Representatives
Preceded by John V. L. Pruyn	Member of the U.S. House of Representatives from New York's 14th congressional district 1869–1871	Succeeded by Eli Perry
Preceded by John H. Bagley Jr.	Member of the U.S. House of Representatives from New York's 15th congressional district 1877–1879	Succeeded by William Lounsbery
