= New York's 15th congressional district =

U.S. House district for New York

Coordinates: 40°49′27″N 73°53′28″W

- Interactive map of district boundaries since January 3, 2025
- Representative: Ritchie Torres; D–The Bronx
- Distribution: 100% urban; 0% rural
- Population (2025): 740,101
- Median household income: $46,974
- Ethnicity: 52.4% Hispanic; 31.7% Black; 9.3% White; 3.3% Asian; 2.0% Two or more races; 1.2% other
- Cook PVI: D+27

New York's 15th congressional district for the United States House of Representatives is located in New York City, State of New York. The district has been represented by Democrat Ritchie Torres since 2021. It is the poorest congressional district in the United States, with a median household income of $44,103, per a 2024 study. The district also ranks first in the state with the poverty rate at 30.7 percent, per a 2026 congressional study.

The 15th district is located entirely within the Bronx, namely the southern portion of the West Bronx as well as the South Bronx. Latinos make up the majority of the district's population, followed by Black people. Whites, Asians and other racial groups comprise a small minority. Yankee Stadium and the Bronx Zoo are both located within the district. The 15th district has the highest percentage of Puerto Ricans of any district in New York, and the second highest percentage of Dominican Americans of any district in New York, after the neighboring 13th congressional district.

== Recent election results from statewide races ==
Year	Office	Results
2008	President	Obama 90% - 10%
2012	President	Obama 93% - 7%
2016	President	Clinton 90% - 8%
2016	Senate	Schumer 92% - 6%
2018	Senate	Gillibrand 93% - 7%
2018	Governor	Cuomo 91% - 7%
2018	Attorney General	James 92% - 7%
2020	President	Biden 85% - 14%
2022	Senate	Schumer 83% - 17%
2022	Governor	Hochul 80% - 20%
2022	Attorney General	James 82% - 18%
2022	Comptroller	DiNapoli 81% - 19%
2024	President	Harris 74% - 25%
2024	Senate	Gillibrand 77% - 22%

== History ==
The district was a Brooklyn-based seat until 1982, when it was realigned to cover the East Side of Manhattan. Following the 1992 redistricting, it became the upper Manhattan seat previously designated the 19th District and the 18th District. After the 2012 redistricting, the 15th became the Bronx's primary district.

From 2003 to 2013 it was composed of Upper Manhattan, Rikers Island and a largely non-residential section of northwestern Queens on the shore of the East River mostly occupied by a Consolidated Edison facility and a New York Power Authority power plant. The district included the neighborhoods of Harlem, Inwood, Marble Hill, Spanish Harlem, Washington Heights, Morningside Heights, and portions of Manhattan that included Apollo Theater, Columbia University, and Grant's Tomb. Much of that district is now the 13th district, while the current 15th is essentially the successor of the former 16th district.

== Current composition ==
The 15th district is located entirely in the New York City borough of The Bronx.

Bronx neighborhoods in the district include:

- Allerton
- Baychester
- Belmont
- Concourse
- Eastchester
- Edenwald
- Highbridge
- Melrose
- Morrisania
- Mott Haven
- Norwood
- Pelham Gardens
- Pelham Parkway
- Port Morris
- Riverdale
- Spuyten Duyvil
- Tremont
- Van Nest
- West Farms
- Williamsbridge

== List of members representing the district ==
=== 1803–1813: one seat ===
Representative	Party	Years	Cong ress	Electoral history
District established March 4, 1803
Gaylord Griswold (Herkimer)	Federalist	March 4, 1803 – March 3, 1805	8th	Elected in 1802. [data missing]
Nathan Williams (Utica)	Democratic-Republican	March 4, 1805 – March 3, 1807	9th	Elected in 1804. [data missing]
William Kirkpatrick (Salina)	Democratic-Republican	March 4, 1807 – March 3, 1809	10th	Elected in 1806. [data missing]
Peter Buell Porter (Buffalo)	Democratic-Republican	March 4, 1809 – March 3, 1813	11th 12th	Elected in 1808. Re-elected in 1810. Retired.

=== Two seats ===
From 1813 to 1823, two seats were apportioned to the 15th district, elected at-large on a general ticket.

Cong ress	Years	Seat A			Seat B		
Cong ress	Years	Representative	Party	Electoral history	Representative	Party	Electoral history
13th	March 4, 1813 – June 21, 1813	Vacant		Representative-elect William Dowse died February 18, 1813, before the term began.	Joel Thompson (Smyrna)	Federalist	Elected in 1812. [data missing]
13th	June 21, 1813 – December 20, 1813	John M. Bowers (Cooperstown)	Federalist	Elected to finish Dowse's term. Lost election contest.	Joel Thompson (Smyrna)	Federalist	Elected in 1812. [data missing]
13th	December 20, 1813 – January 24, 1814	Vacant		Election contested.	Joel Thompson (Smyrna)	Federalist	Elected in 1812. [data missing]
13th	January 24, 1814 – March 3, 1815	Isaac Williams Jr. (Cooperstown)	Democratic-Republican	Successfully contested Bowers's election. [data missing]	Joel Thompson (Smyrna)	Federalist	Elected in 1812. [data missing]
14th	March 4, 1815 – March 3, 1817	James Birdsall (Norwich)	Democratic-Republican	Elected in 1814. [data missing]	Jabez Hammond (Cherry Valley)	Democratic-Republican	Elected in 1814. [data missing]
15th	March 4, 1817 – March 3, 1819	Isaac Williams Jr. (Cooperstown)	Democratic-Republican	Elected in 1816. Retired.	John R. Drake (Owego)	Democratic-Republican	Elected in 1816. Retired.
16th	March 4, 1819 – March 3, 1821	Joseph S. Lyman (Cooperstown)	Democratic-Republican	Elected in 1818. Retired.	Robert Monell (Greene)	Democratic-Republican	Elected in 1818. Lost re-election.
17th	March 4, 1821 – December 3, 1821	Elections were held in April 1821. It is unclear when results were announced or credentials issued.			Elections were held in April 1821. It is unclear when results were announced or credentials issued.		
17th	December 3, 1821 – March 3, 1823	Samuel Campbell (Columbus)	Democratic-Republican	Elected in 1821. Redistricted to the 21st district and lost re-election.	James Hawkes (Richfield)	Democratic-Republican	Elected in 1821. [data missing]

=== 1823–present: one seat ===
Member	Party	Years	Cong ress	Electoral history	Location
John Herkimer (Danube)	Democratic-Republican	March 4, 1823 – March 3, 1825	18th	Elected in 1822. Lost re-election.	1823–1833; Herkimer County
Michael Hoffman (Herkimer)	Jacksonian	March 4, 1825 – March 3, 1833	19th 20th 21st 22nd	Elected in 1824. Re-elected in 1826. Re-elected in 1828. Re-elected in 1830. [data missing]	1823–1833; Herkimer County
Charles McVean (Canajoharie)	Jacksonian	March 4, 1833 – March 3, 1835	23rd	Elected in 1832. [data missing]	1833–1843 [data missing]
Matthias J. Bovee (Amsterdam)	Jacksonian	March 4, 1835 – March 3, 1837	24th	Elected in 1834. [data missing]	1833–1843 [data missing]
John Edwards (Ephratah)	Democratic	March 4, 1837 – March 3, 1839	25th	Elected in 1836. [data missing]	1833–1843 [data missing]
Peter J. Wagner (Fort Plain)	Whig	March 4, 1839 – March 3, 1841	26th	Elected in 1838. [data missing]	1833–1843 [data missing]
John Sanford (Amsterdam)	Democratic	March 4, 1841 – March 3, 1843	27th	Elected in 1840. [data missing]	1833–1843 [data missing]
Lemuel Stetson (Keeseville)	Democratic	March 4, 1843 – March 3, 1845	28th	Elected in 1842. [data missing]	1843–1853 [data missing]
Joseph Russell (Warrensburg)	Democratic	March 4, 1845 – March 3, 1847	29th	Elected in 1844. [data missing]	1843–1853 [data missing]
Sidney Lawrence (Moira)	Democratic	March 4, 1847 – March 3, 1849	30th	Elected in 1846. [data missing]	1843–1853 [data missing]
John R. Thurman (Chestertown)	Whig	March 4, 1849 – March 3, 1851	31st	Elected in 1848. [data missing]	1843–1853 [data missing]
Joseph Russell (Warrensburg)	Democratic	March 4, 1851 – March 3, 1853	32nd	Elected in 1850. [data missing]	1843–1853 [data missing]
Charles Hughes (Sandy Hill)	Democratic	March 4, 1853 – March 3, 1855	33rd	Elected in 1852. [data missing]	1853–1863 [data missing]
Edward Dodd (Argyle)	Opposition	March 4, 1855 – March 3, 1857	34th 35th	Elected in 1854. Re-elected in 1856. [data missing]	1853–1863 [data missing]
Edward Dodd (Argyle)	Republican	March 4, 1857 – March 3, 1859	34th 35th	Elected in 1854. Re-elected in 1856. [data missing]	1853–1863 [data missing]
James B. McKean (Saratoga Springs)	Republican	March 4, 1859 – March 3, 1863	36th 37th	Elected in 1858. Re-elected in 1860. [data missing]	1853–1863 [data missing]
John Augustus Griswold (Troy)	Democratic	March 4, 1863 – March 3, 1865	38th 39th 40th	Elected in 1862. Re-elected in 1864. Re-elected in 1866. [data missing]	1863–1873 [data missing]
John Augustus Griswold (Troy)	Republican	March 4, 1865 – March 3, 1869	38th 39th 40th	Elected in 1862. Re-elected in 1864. Re-elected in 1866. [data missing]	1863–1873 [data missing]
Adolphus H. Tanner (Whitehall)	Republican	March 4, 1869 – March 3, 1871	41st	Elected in 1868. [data missing]	1863–1873 [data missing]
Joseph M. Warren (Troy)	Democratic	March 4, 1871 – March 3, 1873	42nd	Elected in 1870. [data missing]	1863–1873 [data missing]
Eli Perry (Albany)	Democratic	March 4, 1873 – March 3, 1875	43rd	Redistricted from the 14th district and re-elected in 1872. [data missing]	1873–1883 [data missing]
John H. Bagley Jr. (Catskill)	Democratic	March 4, 1875 – March 3, 1877	44th	Elected in 1874. [data missing]	1873–1883 [data missing]
Stephen L. Mayham (Schoharie)	Democratic	March 4, 1877 – March 3, 1879	45th	Elected in 1876. [data missing]	1873–1883 [data missing]
William Lounsbery (Kingston)	Democratic	March 4, 1879 – March 3, 1881	46th	Elected in 1878. [data missing]	1873–1883 [data missing]
Thomas Cornell (Rondout)	Republican	March 4, 1881 – March 3, 1883	47th	Elected in 1880. [data missing]	1873–1883 [data missing]
John H. Bagley Jr. (Catskill)	Democratic	March 4, 1883 – March 3, 1885	48th	Elected in 1882. [data missing]	1883–1893 [data missing]
Lewis Beach (Cornwall)	Democratic	March 4, 1885 – August 10, 1886	49th	Redistricted from the 14th district and re-elected in 1884. Died.	1883–1893 [data missing]
Vacant		August 10, 1886 – December 6, 1886	49th		1883–1893 [data missing]
Henry Bacon (Goshen)	Democratic	December 6, 1886 – March 3, 1889	49th 50th	Elected to finish Beach's term. Also elected in 1886 to the next term. Lost re-election.	1883–1893 [data missing]
Moses D. Stivers (Middletown)	Republican	March 4, 1889 – March 3, 1891	51st	Elected in 1888. [data missing]	1883–1893 [data missing]
Henry Bacon (Goshen)	Democratic	March 4, 1891 – March 3, 1893	52nd	Elected in 1890. [data missing]	1883–1893 [data missing]
Ashbel P. Fitch (New York)	Democratic	March 4, 1893 – December 26, 1893	53rd	Redistricted from the 13th district and re-elected in 1892. Resigned to become New York City Comptroller	1893–1903 [data missing]
Vacant		December 26, 1893 – January 30, 1894	53rd		1893–1903 [data missing]
Isidor Straus (New York)	Democratic	January 30, 1894 – March 3, 1895	53rd	Elected to finish Fitch's term. [data missing]	1893–1903 [data missing]
Philip B. Low (New York)	Republican	March 4, 1895 – March 3, 1899	54th 55th	Elected in 1894. Re-elected in 1896. [data missing]	1893–1903 [data missing]
Jacob Ruppert (New York)	Democratic	March 4, 1899 – March 3, 1903	56th 57th	Elected in 1898. Re-elected in 1900. Redistricted to the 16th district.	1893–1903 [data missing]
William H. Douglas (New York)	Republican	March 4, 1903 – March 3, 1905	58th	Redistricted from the 14th district and re-elected in 1902. [data missing]	1903–1913 [data missing]
J. Van Vechten Olcott (New York)	Republican	March 4, 1905 – March 3, 1911	59th 60th 61st	Elected in 1904. Re-elected in 1906. Re-elected in 1908. [data missing]	1903–1913 [data missing]
Thomas G. Patten (New York)	Democratic	March 4, 1911 – March 3, 1913	62nd	Elected in 1910. Redistricted to the 18th district.	1903–1913 [data missing]
Michael F. Conry (New York)	Democratic	March 4, 1913 – March 2, 1917	63rd 64th	Redistricted from the 12th district and re-elected in 1912. Re-elected in 1914. Re-elected in 1916 but died.	1913–1923 [data missing]
Vacant		March 2, 1917 – April 12, 1917	64th 65th		1913–1923 [data missing]
Thomas F. Smith (New York)	Democratic	April 12, 1917 – March 3, 1919	65th	Elected to finish Conry's term. [data missing]	1913–1923 [data missing]
Peter J. Dooling (New York)	Democratic	March 4, 1919 – March 3, 1921	66th	Redistricted from the 16th district and re-elected in 1918. [data missing]	1913–1923 [data missing]
Thomas J. Ryan (New York)	Republican	March 4, 1921 – March 3, 1923	67th	Elected in 1920. [data missing]	1913–1923 [data missing]
John J. Boylan (New York)	Democratic	March 4, 1923 – October 5, 1938	68th 69th 70th 71st 72nd 73rd 74th 75th	Elected in 1922. Re-elected in 1924. Re-elected in 1926. Re-elected in 1928. Re-elected in 1930. Re-elected in 1932. Re-elected in 1934. Re-elected in 1936. Died.	1923–1933 [data missing]
John J. Boylan (New York)	Democratic	March 4, 1923 – October 5, 1938	68th 69th 70th 71st 72nd 73rd 74th 75th	Elected in 1922. Re-elected in 1924. Re-elected in 1926. Re-elected in 1928. Re-elected in 1930. Re-elected in 1932. Re-elected in 1934. Re-elected in 1936. Died.	1933–1943 [data missing]
Vacant		October 5, 1938 – January 3, 1939	75th		1933–1943 [data missing]
Michael J. Kennedy (New York)	Democratic	January 3, 1939 – January 3, 1943	76th 77th	Elected in 1938. Re-elected in 1940. [data missing]	1933–1943 [data missing]
Thomas F. Burchill (New York)	Democratic	January 3, 1943 – January 3, 1945	78th	Elected in 1942. [data missing]	1943–1953 [data missing]
Emanuel Celler (Brooklyn)	Democratic	January 3, 1945 – January 3, 1953	79th 80th 81st 82nd	Redistricted from the 10th district and re-elected in 1944. Re-elected in 1946. Re-elected in 1948. Re-elected in 1950. Redistricted to the 11th district.	1943–1953 [data missing]
John H. Ray (Staten Island)	Republican	January 3, 1953 – January 3, 1963	83rd 84th 85th 86th 87th	Elected in 1952. Re-elected in 1954. Re-elected in 1956. Re-elected in 1958. Re-elected in 1960. Redistricted to the 16th district and retired.	1953–1963; Parts of Brooklyn and Staten Island
Hugh Carey (Brooklyn)	Democratic	January 3, 1963 – December 31, 1974	88th 89th 90th 91st 92nd 93rd	Redistricted from the 12th district and re-elected in 1962. Re-elected in 1964. Re-elected in 1966. Re-elected in 1968. Re-elected in 1970. Re-elected in 1972. Resigned to become Governor of New York	1963–1973 [data missing]
Hugh Carey (Brooklyn)	Democratic	January 3, 1963 – December 31, 1974	88th 89th 90th 91st 92nd 93rd	Redistricted from the 12th district and re-elected in 1962. Re-elected in 1964. Re-elected in 1966. Re-elected in 1968. Re-elected in 1970. Re-elected in 1972. Resigned to become Governor of New York	1973–1983 [data missing]
Vacant		January 1, 1975 – January 2, 1975	93rd		1973–1983 [data missing]
Leo C. Zeferetti (Brooklyn)	Democratic	January 3, 1975 – January 3, 1983	94th 95th 96th 97th	Elected in 1974. Re-elected in 1976. Re-elected in 1978. Re-elected in 1980. Redistricted to the 14th district and lost re-election.	1973–1983 [data missing]
Bill Green (New York)	Republican	January 3, 1983 – January 3, 1993	98th 99th 100th 101st 102nd	Redistricted from the 18th district and re-elected in 1982. Re-elected in 1984. Re-elected in 1986. Re-elected in 1988. Re-elected in 1990. Redistricted to the 14th district and lost re-election.	1983–1993 [data missing]
Charles Rangel (New York)	Democratic	January 3, 1993 – January 3, 2013	103rd 104th 105th 106th 107th 108th 109th 110th 111th 112th	Redistricted from the 16th district and re-elected in 1992. Re-elected in 1994. Re-elected in 1996. Re-elected in 1998. Re-elected in 2000. Re-elected in 2002. Re-elected in 2004. Re-elected in 2006. Re-elected in 2008. Re-elected in 2010. Redistricted to the 13th district.	1993–2003 [data missing]
Charles Rangel (New York)	Democratic	January 3, 1993 – January 3, 2013	103rd 104th 105th 106th 107th 108th 109th 110th 111th 112th	Redistricted from the 16th district and re-elected in 1992. Re-elected in 1994. Re-elected in 1996. Re-elected in 1998. Re-elected in 2000. Re-elected in 2002. Re-elected in 2004. Re-elected in 2006. Re-elected in 2008. Re-elected in 2010. Redistricted to the 13th district.	2003–2013 Parts of Manhattan and Queens
José E. Serrano (The Bronx)	Democratic	January 3, 2013 – January 3, 2021	113th 114th 115th 116th	Redistricted from the 16th district and re-elected in 2012. Re-elected in 2014. Re-elected in 2016. Re-elected in 2018. Retired when diagnosed with Parkinson's disease.	2013–2023 Parts of the Bronx
Ritchie Torres (The Bronx)	Democratic	January 3, 2021 – present	117th 118th 119th	Elected in 2020. Re-elected in 2022. Re-elected in 2024. Re-elected in 2026.	2013–2023 Parts of the Bronx
Ritchie Torres (The Bronx)	Democratic	January 3, 2021 – present	117th 118th 119th	Elected in 2020. Re-elected in 2022. Re-elected in 2024. Re-elected in 2026.	2023–2025 Parts of the Bronx
Ritchie Torres (The Bronx)	Democratic	January 3, 2021 – present	117th 118th 119th	Elected in 2020. Re-elected in 2022. Re-elected in 2024. Re-elected in 2026.	2025–present Parts of the Bronx

== Recent election results ==
In New York State electoral politics, there are numerous minor parties at various points on the political spectrum. Certain parties will invariably endorse either the Republican or Democratic candidate for every office, hence the state electoral results contain both the party votes, and the final candidate votes (Listed as "Recap").

US House election, 1870: New York District 15
Party	Candidate	Votes	%	±%
Democratic	Joseph M. Warren	17,793	59.9	
Republican	J. Thomas Davis	11,659	39.3	
Temperance	Alvin C. Rose	235	0.8	
Majority		6,134	20.6	
Turnout		29,687	100	

[data missing]

US House election, 1996: New York District 15
Party	Candidate	Votes	%	±%
Democratic	Charles B. Rangel (incumbent)	113,898	91.3	
Republican	Edward R. Adams	5,951	4.8	
Conservative	Ruben Dario Vargas	3,896	3.1	
Right to Life	Jose Suero	989	0.8	
Majority		107,947	86.5	
Turnout		124,734	100	

US House election, 1998: New York District 15
Party	Candidate	Votes	%	±%
Democratic	Charles B. Rangel (incumbent)	90,424	93.1	+1.8
Republican	David E. Cunningham	5,633	5.8	+1.0
Conservative	Patrick McManus	1,082	1.1	−2.0
Majority		84,791	87.3	+0.8
Turnout		97,139	100	−22.1

US House election, 2000: New York District 15
Party	Candidate	Votes	%	±%
Democratic	Charles B. Rangel (incumbent)	130,161	91.9	−1.2
Republican	Jose Agustin Suero	7,346	5.2	−0.6
Green	Dean Loren	2,134	1.5	+1.5
Independence	Jesse A. Fields	1,051	0.7	+0.7
Conservative	Frank Della Valle	492	0.3	−0.8
Libertarian	Scott A. Jeffery	480	0.3	+0.3
Majority		122,815	86.7	−0.6
Turnout		141,664	100	+45.8

US House election, 2002: New York District 15
Party	Candidate	Votes	%	±%
Democratic	Charles B. Rangel (incumbent)	84,367	88.5	−3.4
Republican	Jesse A. Fields	11,008	11.5	+6.3
Majority		73,359	76.9	−9.8
Turnout		95,375	100	−32.7

US House election, 2004: New York District 15
Party	Candidate	Votes	%	±%
Democratic	Charles B. Rangel (incumbent)	161,351	91.1	+2.6
Republican	Kenneth P. Jefferson, Jr.	12,355	7.0	−4.5
Independence	Jessie A. Fields	3,345	1.9	+1.9
Majority		148,996	84.2	+7.3
Turnout		177,051	100	+85.6

US House election, 2006: New York District 15
Party	Candidate	Votes	%	±%
Democratic	Charles B. Rangel (incumbent)	103,916	94.0	+2.9
Republican	Edward Daniels	6,592	6.0	−1.0
Majority		97,324	88.1	+3.9
Turnout		110,508	100	−37.6

US House election, 2008: New York District 15
Party	Candidate	Votes	%	±%
Democratic	Charles B. Rangel (incumbent)	177,151	89.2	−5.8
Republican	Edward Daniels	15,676	7.9	+1.9
Independent	Craig Schley	3,708	1.9	
Socialist Workers	Martin Koppel	2,141	1.1	
Majority		161,475	81.3	−6.8
Turnout		198,676	100	+79.8

US House election, 2010: New York District 15
Party	Candidate	Votes	%	±%
Democratic	Charles B. Rangel (incumbent)	91,225	80.4	−8.7
Republican	Michel Faulkner	11,754	10.4	+2.5
Independent	Craig Schley	7,803	6.9	+5.0
Socialist Workers	Róger Calero	2,647	2.3	+1.2
Majority		79,471	70.1	−11.2
Turnout		113,429	100	−42.9

US House election, 2012: New York District 15
Party	Candidate	Votes	%
Democratic	José Serrano	150,243	95.7
Working Families	José Serrano	2,418	1.5
Total	José Serrano (incumbent)	152,661	97.2
Republican	Frank Della Valle	3,487	2.2
Conservative	Frank Della Valle	940	0.6
Total	Frank Della Valle	4,427	2.8
Total votes		157,088	100.0
Democratic hold			

US House election, 2014: New York District 15
Party	Candidate	Votes	%
Democratic	Jose E. Serrano	53,128	94.0
Working Families	Jose E. Serrano	1,778	3.1
Total	Jose E. Serrano (incumbent)	54,906	97.1
Conservative	Eduardo Ramirez	1,047	1.9
Green	William Edstrom	568	1.0
Total votes		56,521	100.0
Democratic hold			

US House election, 2016: New York District 15
Party	Candidate	Votes	%
Democratic	Jose E. Serrano (incumbent)	165,688	95.3
Republican	Alejandro Vega	6,129	3.5
Conservative	Eduardo Ramirez	2,104	1.2
Total votes		173,921	100.0
Democratic hold			

US House election, 2018: New York District 15
Party	Candidate	Votes	%
Democratic	José Serrano	122,007	94.1
Working Families	José Serrano	2,462	1.9
Total	José Serrano (incumbent)	124,469	96.0
Republican	Jason Gonzalez	4,566	3.5
Conservative	Jason Gonzalez	639	0.5
Total	Jason Gonzalez	5,205	4.0
Total votes		129,674	100.0
Democratic hold			

US House election, 2020: New York District 15
Party	Candidate	Votes	%
Democratic	Ritchie Torres	169,533	88.9
Republican	Patrick Delices	18,894	9.9
Conservative	Patrick Delices	2,237	1.2
Total	Patrick Delices	21,221	11.1
Total votes		190,754	100.0
Democratic hold			

US House election, 2022: New York District 15
Party	Candidate	Votes	%
Democratic	Ritchie Torres (incumbent)	76,406	82.7
Republican	Stylo Sapaskis	15,882	17.2
Total votes		92,390	100.0
Democratic hold			

US House election, 2024: New York District 15
Party	Candidate	Votes	%
Democratic	Ritchie Torres (incumbent)	130,392	76.5
Republican	Gonzalo Duran	32,494	19.0
Conservative	Gonzalo Duran	3,516	2.1
Total	Gonzalo Duran	36,010	21.1
Independent	Jose Vega	4,086	2.4
Total votes		170,488	100.0
Democratic hold			

== See also ==
- List of United States congressional districts
- New York's congressional delegations
- New York's congressional districts
