= Jabez Delano Hammond =

American politician

Jabez Delano Hammond (August 2, 1778 – August 18, 1855) was an American medical doctor, lawyer, writer and politician.

== Life ==
Hammond was born in New Bedford, Bristol County, Massachusetts. He practiced medicine in Reading, Vermont, but afterward studied law and followed that profession at Cherry Valley.

He was a Democratic-Republican member of the United States Congress from 1815 to 1817, a member of the New York State Senate from 1817 to 1821, and a member of the Council of Appointment in 1818. In 1825, he was appointed one of the commissioners in the settlement of the claims of New York State against the Federal Government.

In April 1825, he was appointed one of three State Road Commissioners, the other two were Nathaniel Pitcher and George Morell. These commissioners had to "explore and cause surveys to be made of a route for a State road from some point on the North River to some point on Lake Erie, through the southern tier of counties."

He was First Judge of the Otsego County Court from 1838 to 1843. He was a regent of the University of the State of New York from 1845 until his death, which occurred in Cherry Valley, Otsego County, New York.

== Works ==
- The History of Political Parties in the State of New-York, from the Ratification of the Federal Constitution to 1840 by Jabez D. Hammond (4th ed., Vol. 1, H. & E. Phinney, Cooperstown, 1846)
- Political History of the State of New York from January 1, 1841, to January 1, 1847, Vol III, including the Life of Silas Wright (Hall & Dickson, Syracuse NY, 1848)
- Life and Opinions of Julius Melbourn (1847)
- Life of Silas Wright (1848)

== Sources ==
- United States Congress. "Jabez Delano Hammond (id: H000127)". Biographical Directory of the United States Congress.
- Political Graveyard (name misspelled)
- Obit in NYT on August 23, 1855

U.S. House of Representatives
Preceded by Isaac Williams, Jr., Joel Thompson	Member of the U.S. House of Representatives from New York's 15th congressional district 1815–1817 with James Birdsall	Succeeded by Isaac Williams, Jr., John R. Drake
