= Thomas Cornell (politician) =

American politician

Thomas C. Cornell
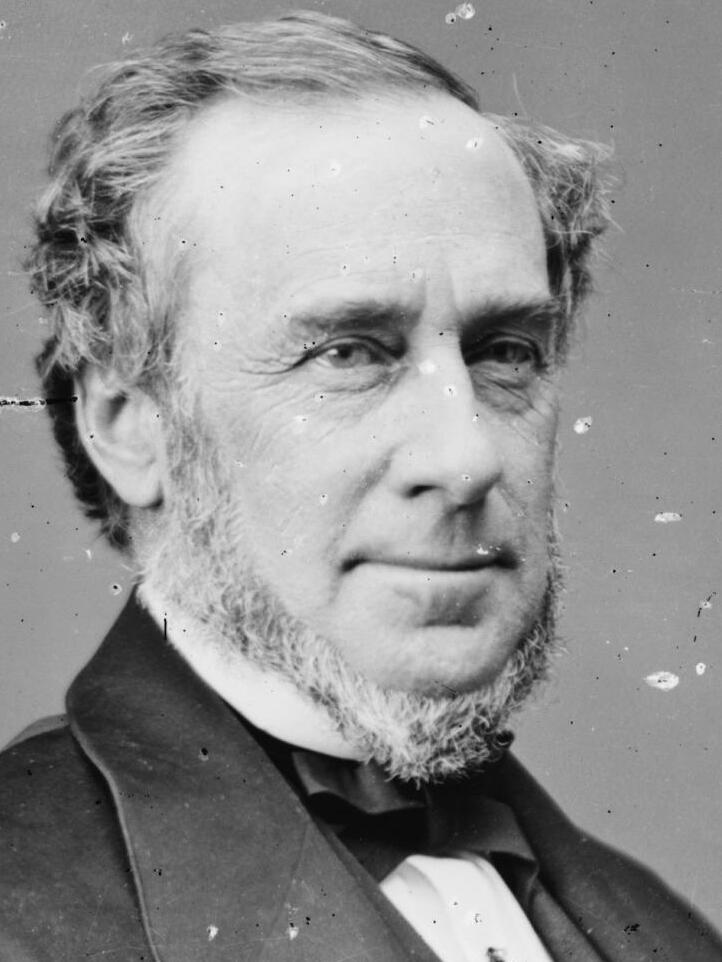

Member of the U.S. House of Representatives from New York
- In office March 4, 1881 – March 3, 1883
- Preceded by: William Lounsbery
- Succeeded by: John H. Bagley Jr.
- Constituency: 15th district
- In office March 4, 1867 – March 3, 1869
- Preceded by: Edwin N. Hubbell
- Succeeded by: John A. Griswold
- Constituency: 13th district

Personal details
- Born: January 27, 1814 White Plains, New York, U.S.
- Died: March 13, 1890 (aged 76) Kingston, New York, U.S.
- Party: Republican
- Spouse: Catherine Ann Woodmancie (m. 1840)
- Children: 4
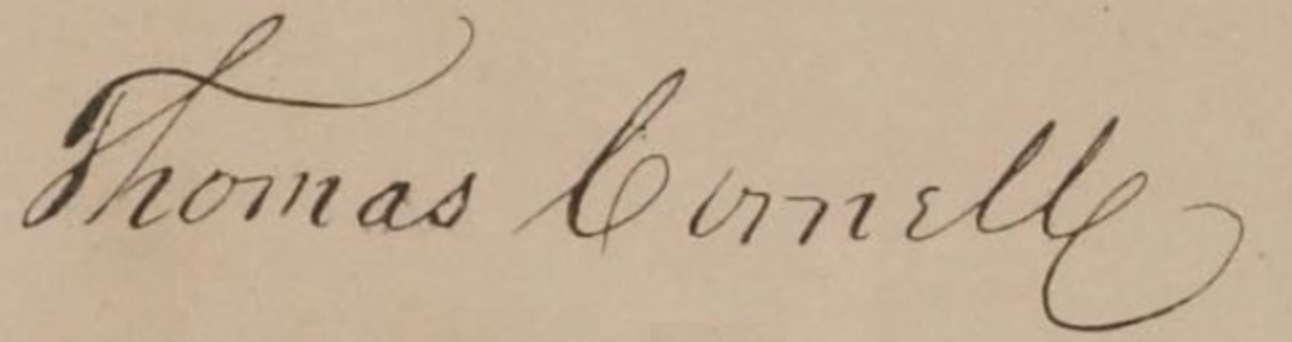
- Signature

Thomas C. Cornell (January 27, 1814 – March 30, 1890) was an American politician and businessman. During the American Civil War, he was commissioned as a major in the New York Militia. He served two terms in Congress running on the Republican Party line, first from 1867 to 1869, and again from 1881 to 1883.

== Biography ==
He was born in White Plains, New York, on January 27, 1814, to Peter Cornell (1780–1860) and Margaret Gedney (1786–1829). He was a descendant and namesake of Thomas Cornell, the progenitor of the Cornell family in North America.

After attending public schools, Thomas C. Cornell was drawn to Rondout, N.Y. by his uncle, Thomas W. Cornell, Peter's brother. Thomas W. came to the Rondout area in 1822 and opened a general store in New Salem. When the Delaware and Hudson canal opened in 1828 his business grew rapidly.

In the 1830s, Thomas C. Cornell worked for David P. Mapes of Coxsackie, NY. Mapes' enterprises foreshadowed Cornell's business success. Mapes owned the sidewheeler General Jackson which had the contract to haul barges for the D&H Canal Company and he also owned a stage line running from Rondout into the Catskills.

In 1837, with his own sloop, Cornell started what was to become the Cornell Steamboat Company. In 1850, he obtained the contract for towing D&H Canal Company barges. Following the Civil War, the Cornell Steamboat Line virtually monopolized freight traffic on the Hudson River, dominating the towing of barges well into the 1900s. While the Steamboat Company was the heart of his empire, Cornell engaged in many other related enterprises.

In 1866, he incorporated what was to become the Ulster and Delaware Railroad (U&D). He was involved in the construction and operation of several other railroads including the Wallkill Valley and the Rhinebeck and Connecticut Railroad.

In 1868, along with other business leaders in Rondout, he founded the Rondout Savings Bank. He is also reported to have been a founder of a commercial bank.

Cornell at one time owned the Grand Hotel, a luxurious hotel set on the border between Ulster and Delaware counties. The Grand Hotel had its own station, Grand Hotel Station (today known as Highmount) on the Ulster and Delaware Railroad.

He died in Kingston, New York, on March 30, 1890, and was interred at the Montrepose Cemetery.

== Personal life ==
Thomas Cornell was married to Catherine Ann Woodmancie (1822–1898) on February 27, 1840. They had four children: Mary Augusta Cornell (1842–?), married Samuel Decker Coykendall who Cornell partnered with in many business ventures; Peter Gedney Cornell (1846) died in infancy; Hiram Schoonmaker Cornell (1849) died in infancy; Cornelia Lucy Cornell (1854–1902), married Robert Bayard Carpenter.

U.S. House of Representatives
Preceded by Edwin N. Hubbell	Member of the U.S. House of Representatives from New York's 13th congressional district 1867–1869	Succeeded by John A. Griswold
Preceded by William Lounsbery	Member of the U.S. House of Representatives from New York's 15th congressional district 1881–1883	Succeeded by John H. Bagley, Jr.
