= Lemuel Stetson =

American politician

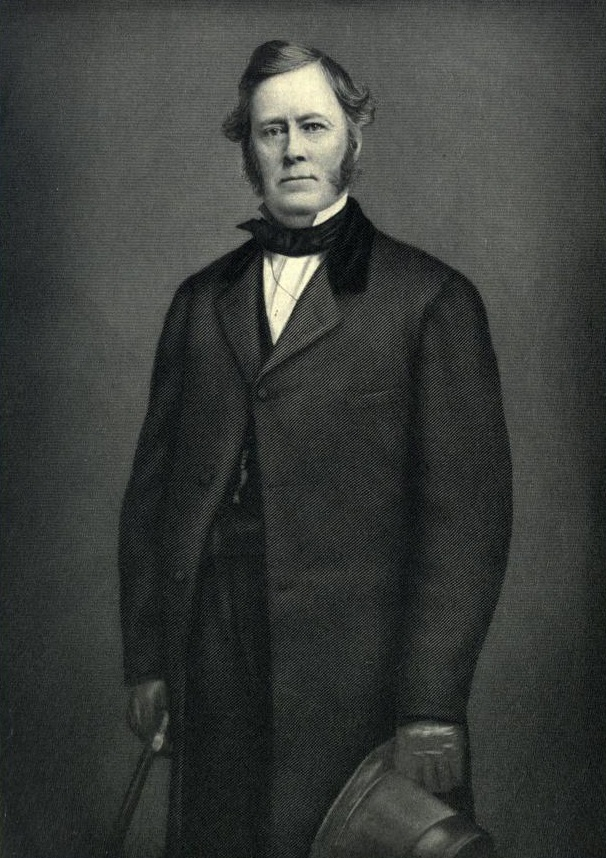

Member of the U.S. House of Representatives from New York's 15th district
- In office March 4, 1843 – March 3, 1845
- Preceded by: John Sanford
- Succeeded by: Joseph Russell

Personal details
- Born: Lemuel Stetson; March 13, 1804 Champlain, New York, US
- Died: May 17, 1868 (aged 64) Plattsburgh, New York, US
- Resting place: Riverside Cemetery in Plattsburgh, New York
- Party: Democratic Party (United States)
- Occupation: lawyer, jurist, politician

Lemuel Stetson (March 13, 1804 – May 17, 1868) was an attorney, politician and judge from Plattsburgh, New York. He was most notable for his service as judge of the Clinton County, New York court and one term as a United States representative from New York from 1843 to 1845.

== Early life ==
Stetson was born in Champlain, New York, one of thirteen children born to Reuben and Lois (Smedley) Stetson of Hardwick, Massachusetts. Stetson was raised on his family's farm and attended the public schools of Champlain. He attended the academy in Plattsburgh and received additional instruction in classical languages from the academy's principal. Stetson taught school while studying law with attorneys Julius C. Hubbell of Chazy, Henry. K. Averill of Rouses Point, and John Lynde of Plattsburgh. He was admitted to the bar in 1828 and commenced practice in Keeseville, New York.

== Start of career ==
In addition to practicing law, Stetson became active in politics as a Democrat. He was a member of the New York State Assembly in 1835, 1836, and 1842. From 1838 to 1843, Stetson served as district attorney of Clinton County.

Stetson was active in several upstate New York businesses, including serving as secretary and a board of directors member of the Clinton and Essex Mutual Insurance Company.

== Congressman ==
Stetson was elected to the United States House of Representatives in 1842 and served in the 28th Congress (March 4, 1843 - March 3, 1845). During his term in the US House, Stetson was a member of the House Foreign Affairs Committee and the Committee on Revolutionary Claims. In addition, he was chairman of the Committee on District of Columbia.

== Later career ==
In 1846, Stetson was a delegate to the New York State Constitutional Convention and was chairman of the committee that considered the powers and duties of the state legislature. In 1847, he moved to Plattsburgh to take office as judge of the Clinton County court, and he served from 1847 to 1851. Stetson was involved in the long running dispute between the Barnburners and Hunkers of New York's Democratic Party and in 1855 was the unsuccessful "Soft Hunker" nominee for New York State Comptroller. He was a delegate to the 1860 Democratic National Convention in Baltimore, where he supported Stephen A. Douglas for president.

Stetson returned to the State Assembly in and 1862, during the American Civil War. Stetson was a pro-Union Democrat and supported measures to prosecute the war and prevent the Confederate states from seceding.

== Death and burial ==
Stetson died in Plattsburgh on May 17, 1868. He was buried at Riverside Cemetery in Plattsburgh.

== Family ==
In 1831 Stetson married Helen Hascall (1808-1860). Their children included sons Ralph, John, Francis, and William. John was killed during the Civil War's Maryland campaign while serving as lieutenant colonel and second in command of the 59th New York Volunteer Infantry Regiment.

== Sources ==
=== Magazines ===
- Nelson, Horace (March 1, 1850). "Honorable Lemuel Stetson: County Judge of the County of Clinton". Northern Lancet and Gazette of Legal Medicine. Vol. 1, no. 2. Plattsburgh, NY: The Lancet Office – via Google Books.

=== Books ===
- James E., Homans, ed. (1918). The Cyclopedia of American Biography. Vol. VIII. New York, NY: The Press Association Compilers – via Internet Archive.
- Spencer, Thomas E. (1998). Where They're Buried. Baltimore, MD: Clearfield Company. p. 253. ISBN 978-0-8063-4823-0 – via Internet Archive.

=== Newspapers ===
- "Death Notice, Lemuel Stetson". Burlington Times. Burlington, VT. May 23, 1868 – via Newspapers.com.

U.S. House of Representatives
| Preceded by John Sanford | Member of the U.S. House of Representatives from New York's 15th congressional district 1843–1845 | Succeeded by Joseph Russell |
New York State Assembly
| Preceded by Henry McFadden | New York State Assembly; Clinton County; 1862 | Succeeded by George Adgate |
