= Joseph Russell (New York politician) =

American politician

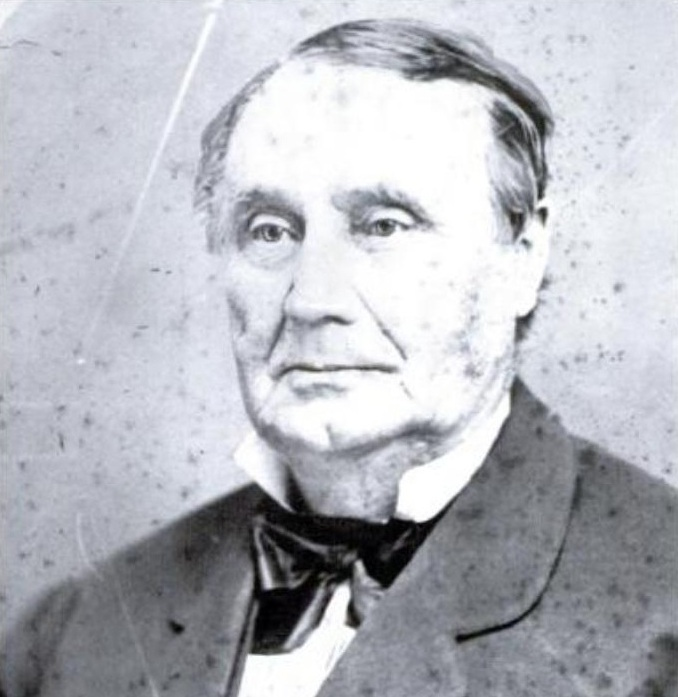

Member of the U.S. House of Representatives from New York's 12th district
- In office March 4, 1851 – March 3, 1853
- Preceded by: John R. Thurman
- Succeeded by: Charles Hughes
- In office March 4, 1845 – March 3, 1847
- Preceded by: Lemuel Stetson
- Succeeded by: Sidney Lawrence

Member of the New York State Assembly
- In office 1840

Personal details
- Born: 1800 Warrensburg, New York, U.S.
- Died: April 24, 1875 (aged 74–75) Glens Falls, New York, U.S.
- Party: Democratic

Joseph Russell (1800 – April 24, 1875) was an American politician who served as a U.S. Representative from New York's 12th congressional district from 1845 to 1847 and again from 1851 to 1853.

== Early life ==
Russell was born in Warrensburg, New York in 1800.

== Career ==
Russell became active in several businesses, including lumbering and part-ownership of the Warrensburg House Hotel. Russell was also a founder of Warrensburg's Masonic Lodge.

=== Political career ===
A Democrat, Russell served as Town Supervisor in 1830, 1835 and 1840. He was Warren County Sheriff from November 1834 to November 1837, and served in the New York State Assembly in 1840.

==== Congress ====
Russell was elected to the 29th Congress (March 4, 1845 – March 3, 1847). He returned to the House as a member of the 32nd Congress (March 4, 1851 – March 3, 1853).

=== Later career ===
He later moved to Glens Falls, where he was a founder of the First National Bank of Glens Falls and became active in the Glens Falls Masonic Lodge.

== Death ==
Russell died in Glens Falls on April 24, 1875. He was buried at Glens Falls Cemetery.

== Sources ==
- United States Congress. "Joseph Russell (id: R000532)". Biographical Directory of the United States Congress.

U.S. House of Representatives
Preceded by Lemuel Stetson	Member of the U.S. House of Representatives from New York's 15th congressional district 1845–1847	Succeeded by Sidney Lawrence
Preceded by John R. Thurman	Member of the U.S. House of Representatives from New York's 15th congressional district 1851–1853	Succeeded by Charles Hughes
