= William Dowse =

American politician

Member-elect of the U.S. House of Representatives from New York's 15th district
- Died before taking office
- Preceded by: Peter Porter
- Succeeded by: John M. Bowers

Personal details
- Born: 1770 Cooperstown, New York, British America
- Died: February 18, 1813 (aged 42–43)
- Party: Federalist

William Dowse (1770 – February 18, 1813) was an American lawyer and politician from New York.

== Life ==
Dowse was elected as a Federalist to the United States House of Representatives in the 15th District, but died before his term began.

At the time of Dowse's death, William G. Angel was a clerk in his office.

== See also ==
- List of United States representatives-elect who never took their seats

== Notes ==
U.S. House of Representatives
Preceded by Peter Porter	Member-elect of the U.S. House of Representatives from New York's 15th congressional district 1812–1813	Succeeded by John M. Bowers
