= John H. Bagley Jr. =

American politician

John Holroyd Bagley Jr.
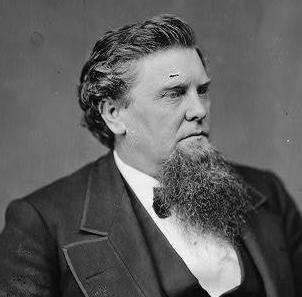

Member of the New York State Assembly from the Greene County district
- In office January 1, 1888 – December 31, 1888
- Preceded by: Francis G. Walters
- Succeeded by: Francis G. Walters

Member of the U.S. House of Representatives from New York's 15th district
- In office March 4, 1883 – March 3, 1885
- Preceded by: Thomas Cornell
- Succeeded by: Lewis Beach
- In office March 4, 1875 – March 3, 1877
- Preceded by: Eli Perry
- Succeeded by: Stephen L. Mayham

Personal details
- Born: November 26, 1832 Hudson, New York, US
- Died: October 23, 1902 (aged 69) Catskill, New York, US
- Party: Democratic
- Spouse: Lydia M. Wicht Bagley
- Children: Lydia Wicht Bagley
- Profession: mining; real estate; banker; politician

John Holroyd Bagley Jr. (November 26, 1832 – October 23, 1902) was an American politician and a United States representative from New York, serving two non-consecutive terms from 1875 to 1877, and from 1883 to 1885.

== Biography ==
Born in Hudson, New York, Bagley attended the common schools. He married Lydia M. Wicht, and they had a daughter, Lydia Wicht.

== Career ==
In 1852 Bagley went to California and engaged in mining and other pursuits. He returned to New York and engaged in steamboating on the Hudson River. He settled in Catskill, Greene County and engaged in mercantile pursuits and the manufacture of leather. He was supervisor of the town of Catskill from 1860 to 1864.

Elected as a Democrat to the Forty-fourth Congress, Bagley was a U.S. Representative for the fifteenth district of New York. He served from March 4, 1875 to March 3, 1877. He was not a candidate for renomination in 1876 and resumed his former mercantile pursuits. He was then elected to the Forty-eighth Congress, holding office from March 4, 1883 to March 3, 1885. During the Forty-eight Congress he was chairman of the Committee on Manufactures. Not a candidate for renomination in 1884, he engaged in banking and the insurance business and also served as vice president of the Catskill Mountain Railway Co.

Trustee of the village of Catskill, Bagley was also a member of the New York State Assembly (Greene Co.) in 1888. He was an unsuccessful candidate for election in 1896 to the Fifty-fifth Congress.

== Death ==
Bagley died in Catskill, Greene County, New York, on October 23, 1902 (age 69). He is interred at Village Cemetery, Catskill, New York.

U.S. House of Representatives
Preceded by Eli Perry	Member of the U.S. House of Representatives from New York's 15th congressional district 1875–1877	Succeeded by Stephen L. Mayham
Preceded by Thomas Cornell	Member of the U.S. House of Representatives from New York's 15th congressional district 1883–1885	Succeeded by Lewis Beach
New York State Assembly
Preceded by Francis G. Walters	New York State Assembly; Greene County; 1888	Succeeded by Francis G. Walters
