= John R. Drake (New York politician) =

American politician

New York State Assembly
- In office 1834

First Judge of the Tioga County Court
- In office 1833–1838

Member of the U.S. House of Representatives from New York's 15th district
- In office March 4, 1817 – March 3, 1819
- Preceded by: James Birdsall; Jabez D. Hammond
- Succeeded by: Joseph S. Lyman; Robert Monell

First Judge of the Broome County Court
- In office 1815–1823

Personal details
- Born: November 28, 1782 Pleasant Valley, New York
- Died: March 21, 1857 (aged 74) Owego, New York
- Resting place: Evergreen Cemetery
- Party: Democratic-Republican
- Spouse: Jerusha Roberts
- Children: Delphine

John Reuben Drake (November 28, 1782 in Pleasant Valley, Dutchess County, New York – March 21, 1857 in Owego, Tioga County, New York) was a U.S. representative from New York.

== Life ==
He was the son of Rev. Reuben Drake (a Baptist minister from a line of wealthy landowners) and Phoebe Sherwood. Drake completed preparatory studies and engaged in mercantile and agricultural pursuits, such as projecting the New York & Erie Railroad. He married Jerusha Roberts, with whom he had a daughter, Delphine Drake.

He was Supervisor of the Town of Owego in 1813 and First Judge of the Broome County Court from 1815 to 1823. In 1823, he was one of three commissioners overseeing construction of the historic Tioga County Courthouse. Drake was a member of the Free Masons' lodge of Owego.

Drake was elected as a Democratic-Republican to the 15th United States Congress, holding office from March 4, 1817, to March 3, 1819. There he served on the Committee on Expenditures on the Public Buildings.

He was First Judge of the Tioga County Court from 1833 to 1838, a member of the New York State Assembly in 1834, and President of the Village of Owego from 1841 to 1845.

He is interred in Evergreen Cemetery.

U.S. House of Representatives
| Preceded by James Birdsall, Jabez D. Hammond | Member of the U.S. House of Representatives from New York's 15th congressional district 1817–1819 with Isaac Williams, Jr. | Succeeded by Joseph S. Lyman, Robert Monell |
