= John Herkimer =

American politician (1773-1848)

John Herkimer (1773 Tryon County, New York – June 8, 1848 Danube, Herkimer County, New York) was an American lawyer and politician from New York.

== Life ==
Herkimer was the son of George Herkimer (brother of Gen. Nicholas Herkimer and Johan Jost Herkimer).

He was a member from Montgomery County of the New York State Assembly in 1800, 1804 and 1806. He was a delegate to the New York State Constitutional Convention of 1801.

During the War of 1812, he served in the State Militia as a Major, leading a battalion in the defense of Sackets Harbor, New York.

In 1817, the Town of Danube (in which area Herkimer's home was located) was created from a part of the Town of Minden, and the area transferred from Montgomery to Herkimer County. Afterwards Herkimer was an associate judge of the Herkimer County Court for some years.

Herkimer was elected as a Democratic-Republican to the 15th and the 18th United States Congresses, holding office from March 4, 1817, to March 3, 1819; and from March 4, 1823, to March 3, 1825.

He was buried at the General Herkimer Cemetery in Danube.

U.S. House of Representatives
Preceded by Daniel Cady	Member of the U.S. House of Representatives from New York's 14th congressional district 1817–1819	Succeeded by John Fay
Preceded by Samuel Campbell; James Hawkes	Member of the U.S. House of Representatives from New York's 15th congressional district 1823–1825	Succeeded by Michael Hoffman
