= Midphalangeal hair =

Hair in the ring finger

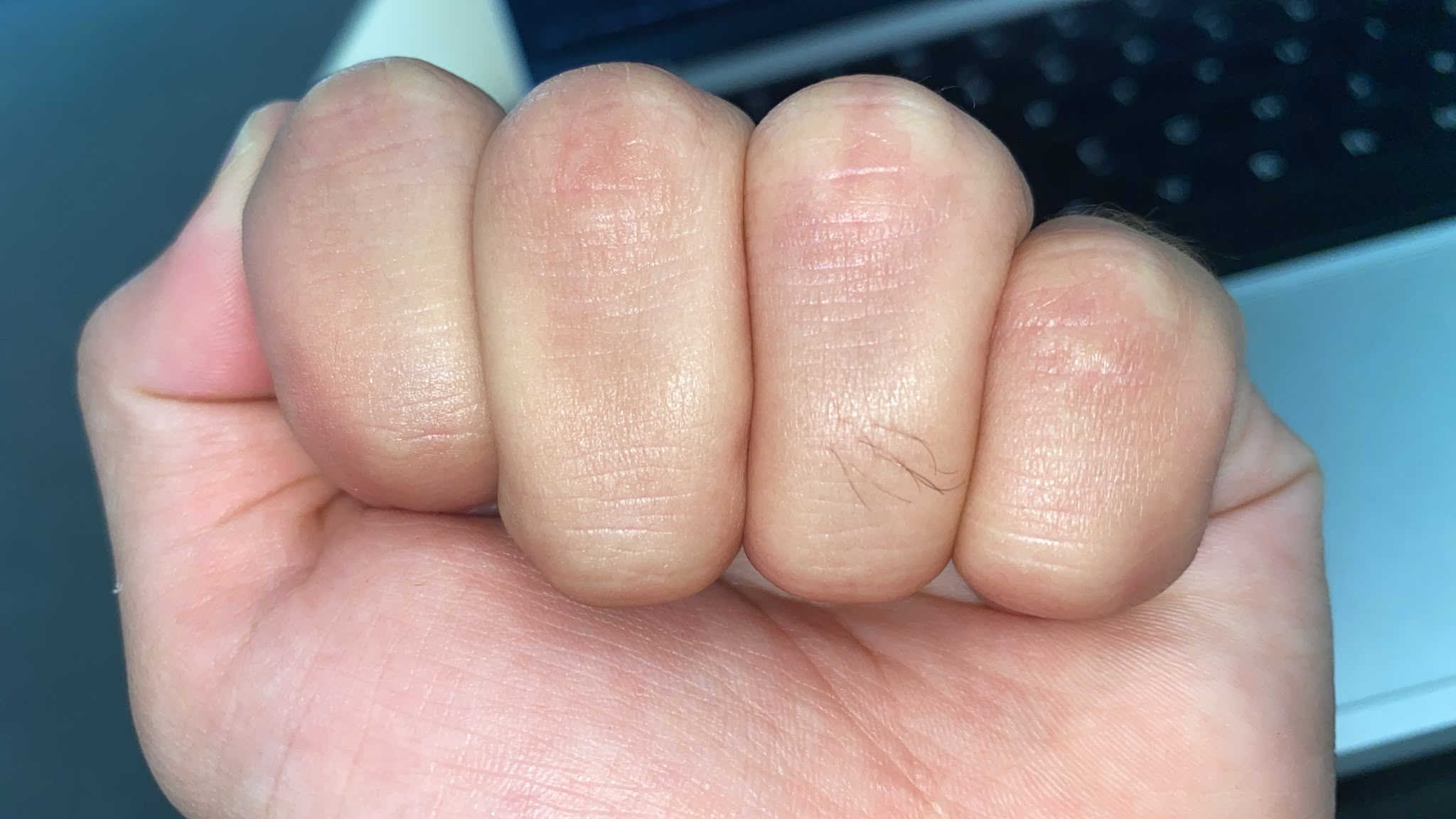

Midphalangeal hair, or the presence/absence of hair on the middle phalanx of the ring finger, is one of the most widely studied markers in classical genetics of human populations. Although this polymorphism was observed at other fingers as well, for this kind of research, the fourth finger of the hand has been conventionally selected.

== Description ==
In humans, hair is commonly present on all the basal segments of the digits and invariably absent from all the terminal ones. On the middle segments, there is wide fluctuation with apparent familial and racial tendencies. Hair is present on the middle segment of the fingers more frequently than on the middle segment of the toes. Hair is most often found on the middle segment of the fourth finger.

== History ==
Willier (1974), related citations quoted Danforth as stating that 'the hair follicle is a kind of biological microcosm in which almost any problem relating to growth, differentiation, decline and rejuvenescence of tissue can be studied to advantage....' While riding on a streetcar in Wilkes-Barre one summer, Danforth observed, in his own words, that 'a man in front of me draped his arm over the back of the seat and I noticed that while his arm was very hairy the middle segments of his fingers were free of hair and so, I observed, were my own; but I knew this was not generally true.' So far as he was aware, no one before had recognized this variation as possibly hereditary.

== Inheritance ==
The genetic determination of presence or absence of hair on the dorsal aspect of the middle phalanx was first suggested by Danforth (1921). From a study of 80 families with a total of 178 children, he suggested that 'a phylogenetically progressive loss of hair is brought about through the action of one or more recessive genes, or of one primary recessive gene with several modifying factors that regulate the distribution of hair when it is present.' Stated conversely, 'despite the fact that in evolutionary progress hair is disappearing from the mid-digital region, its presence...may be regarded as the manifestation of a dominant trait.'

Bernstein and Burks (1942) suggested that 5 allelic genes, A-0 to A-4, 'control the inheritance and distribution of middigital hair involving but a single gene substitution (the subscript denoting the number of fingers affected with middigital hair),' and that the genes for the presence of hair are dominant over the genes for its absence.

From a literature review and their own study in Brazil, Saldanha and Guinsburg (1961) suggested that lack of middle phalangeal hair may be determined by a pair of recessive genes, but noted that the occurrence of sex, age, and possibly environmental differences make genetic analysis of the trait difficult.

Egesi and Rashid (2010) reviewed the subject of middigital hair and its clinical significance.

== Population genetics ==
Danforth (1921) reported that middigital hair was present in men more often than in women. Caucasians were found to have a higher incidence of middle phalangeal hair than other ethnic groups, including Afro-Americans, American Indians, and Japanese.

Saldanha and Guinsburg (1961) studied the presence or absence of middigital hair in a white population of São Paulo, Brazil, including 131 males and 158 females, and compared their findings with those of previous reports. The frequencies of individuals with midphalangeal hair showed striking population differences. The range among northern Europeans varied from 70 to 80%, and among Mediterraneans, from 50 to 70%. Among Japanese, American Indians, and Afro-Americans, the figures varied between about 10% and 40%. The trait was virtually absent among the Inuit.

- Midphalangeal hairiness (%)

Population	Males		Females		Total
Population	$N$	%	$N$	%	$N$	$q$_{d}
Arabs – Christians − Baghdad	48	64.6	14	50.7	62	0.62
Arabs – Muslims − Baghdad	233	67.4	132	50.7	265	0.73
Armenians − Beirut	165	62.4	172	61.6	337	0.62
Basques − San Sebastián	25	64.0	53	73.6	78	0.54
Bosnia and Herzegovina – 10 localities	2,964	44.13	2,296	39.85	5,260	0.71
Egypt – Copts − Cairo	55	65.5	52	46.2	107	0.66
Egypt – Muslims − Cairo	228	45.6	203	36.2	431	0.67
Georgia − Tbilisi	62	56.4	71	33.8	133	0.75
Jews − Baghdad	69	71.0	136	59.6	205	0.60
Syrians – Christians − Baghdad	90	68.9	16	50.0	106	0.58
Syrians – Muslims − Baghdad	129	58.1	66	54.5	195	0.66
Ukraine − Kharkiv	58	56.9	112	50.9	170	0.69

== See also ==
- Gene interaction
- Dominance
