= Samuel Campbell (American politician) =

American politician

Member of the U.S. House of Representatives from New York's 15th district
- In office December 3, 1821 – March 3, 1823
- Preceded by: Joseph S. Lyman; Robert Monell
- Succeeded by: John Herkimer

Member of the New York State Assembly
- In office 1808-09, 1812, 1820

Personal details
- Born: July 11, 1773 Mansfield, Connecticut Colony, British America
- Died: June 2, 1853 (aged 79) Columbus, New York, U.S.
- Party: Democratic-Republican
- Occupation: farmer, lawyer

Samuel Campbell (July 11, 1773 – June 2, 1853) was an American politician from New York.

== Life ==
Campbell attended the common schools. He removed to Columbus, New York and engaged in agricultural pursuits. He was Supervisor of the Town of Columbus in 1807, 1808, 1821 and 1840.

He was a member of the New York State Assembly in 1808-09, 1812 and 1820. He served on the staff of Maj. Gen. Nathaniel King as division quartermaster in the War of 1812. He was an associate judge of the Chenango County Court in 1814, Sheriff of Chenango County from 1815 to 1819. and a Justice of the Peace for twenty-five years.

Campbell was elected as a Democratic-Republican to the 17th United States Congress, holding office from December 3, 1821, to March 3, 1823. Afterwards he resumed his agricultural pursuits, and later became a Whig.

He was buried at the Lambs Corners Cemetery.

U.S. House of Representatives
Preceded by Joseph S. Lyman, Robert Monell	Member of the U.S. House of Representatives from New York's 15th congressional district 1821–1823 with James Hawkes	Succeeded by John Herkimer
