= James Hawkes (New York politician) =

American politician

- Born: December 13, 1776; Petersham, Worcester County, Massachusetts, United States
- Died: October 2, 1865 (aged 88); Rochester, Monroe County, New York, United States
- Burial place: Mount Hope Cemetery, Rochester
- Occupation: politician
- Known for: member, New York State Assembly (1820); representative, Seventeenth United States Congress (1821–1823)

James Hawkes (December 13, 1776 – October 2, 1865) was an American politician from New York.

== Life ==
Hawkes was born December 13, 1776 in Petersham, Worcester County, Massachusetts. He moved with his parents to Richfield, New York in 1789. He attended the common schools, taught school in Richfield and later in Burlington. Hawkes returned to Richfield, and was Sheriff of Otsego County from 1815 to 1819. He was a member of the New York State Assembly in 1820.

Hawkes was elected as a Democratic-Republican to the Seventeenth United States Congress, holding office from December 3, 1821, to March 3, 1823.

He died October 2, 1865 in Rochester, Monroe County, New York and was buried at the Mount Hope Cemetery, Rochester.

U.S. House of Representatives
Preceded by Joseph S. Lyman, Robert Monell	Member of the U.S. House of Representatives from New York's 15th congressional district 1821–1823 with Samuel Campbell	Succeeded by John Herkimer
