= Isaac Williams Jr. =

American politician (1777–1860)

Isaac Williams Jr. (April 5, 1777 in Goshen, Litchfield County, Connecticut – November 9, 1860 in Cooperstown, Otsego County, New York) was an American politician from New York.

== Life ==
He received a limited schooling, and in 1793 moved with his father to Otsego County, New York. He was appointed Undersheriff of Otsego County in 1810, and Sheriff in 1811, remaining in office until 1813.

He successfully contested as a Democratic-Republican the election of Federalist John M. Bowers to the 13th United States Congress to fill the vacancy caused by the death of Representative-elect William Dowse (1770–1813), and served from January 24, 1814, to March 3, 1815. Williams was elected again, to the 15th United States Congress, holding office from March 4, 1817 to March 3, 1819. He was then elected again, to the 18th United States Congress, holding office from March 4, 1823, to March 3, 1825.

He was buried at the Warren Cemetery, in Otsego, New York.

U.S. House of Representatives
Preceded by John M. Bowers, Joel Thompson	Member of the U.S. House of Representatives from New York's 15th congressional district 1814–1815 with Joel Thompson	Succeeded by James Birdsall, Jabez D. Hammond
Preceded by James Birdsall, Jabez D. Hammond	Member of the U.S. House of Representatives from New York's 15th congressional district 1817–1819 with John R. Drake	Succeeded by Joseph S. Lyman, Robert Monell
Preceded by John Gebhard	Member of the U.S. House of Representatives from New York's 13th congressional district 1823–1825	Succeeded by William G. Angel
