= Robert Monell =

American politician (1787–1860)

Robert Monell (April 25, 1787 – November 29, 1860) was an American lawyer and politician from New York. From 1829 to 1831, he served one term in the U.S. House of Representatives as a Jacksonian.

== Life ==
Monell was born in Columbia County, New York on April 25, 1787. Monell studied law, was admitted to the bar in 1809, and commenced practice at Binghamton, New York. In 1811, he removed to Greene.

=== Political career ===
He was a member from Chenango County of the New York State Assembly in 1814-15.

==== Congress ====
Monell was elected as a Democratic-Republican to the 16th United States Congress, holding office from March 4, 1819, to March 3, 1821.

He was again a member of the State Assembly in 1825, 1826 and 1828; and was D.A. of Chenango County in 1827.

Monell was elected as a Jacksonian to the 21st United States Congress, holding office from March 4, 1829, to February 21, 1831, when he resigned.

=== Later career and death ===
He was Judge of the Sixth Circuit Court from 1831 to 1846. Afterwards he resumed the practice of law;

He died in 1860 in Greene, New York, and was buried at the Hornby Cemetery.

U.S. House of Representatives
Preceded by John R. Drake, Isaac Williams, Jr.	Member of the U.S. House of Representatives from New York's 15th congressional district 1819–1821 with Joseph S. Lyman	Succeeded by Samuel Campbell, James Hawkes
Preceded by John C. Clark	Member of the U.S. House of Representatives from New York's 21st congressional district 1829–1831	Succeeded by John A. Collier
