= John M. Bowers =

American politician

John Myer Bowers

Member of the U.S. House of Representatives from New York's 15th district
- In office June 21, 1813 – December 20, 1813
- Preceded by: Peter B. Porter
- Succeeded by: Isaac Williams, Jr., Joel Thompson

Personal details
- Born: September 25, 1772 Boston, Province of Massachusetts Bay, British America
- Died: February 24, 1846 (aged 73) Cooperstown, New York, U.S.
- Citizenship: United States
- Party: Federalist
- Education: Columbia College
- Profession: Attorney

John Myer Bowers (September 25, 1772 – February 24, 1846) was an American politician and a U.S. Representative from New York.

== Life and career ==
Bowers was born in the Province of Massachusetts Bay, the son of Mary (nee Myer) and Henry Bowers. He attended the common schools, and graduated from Columbia College in New York City. Then he studied law and was admitted to the bar in 1802.

Bowers commenced practice in Cooperstown, and moved to his country home, "Lakelands," near Cooperstown, New York, in 1805. He was declared elected as a Federalist to the 13th United States Congress to fill the vacancy caused by the death of Representative-elect William Dowse and served as United States Representative for the fifteenth district of New York from June 21, 1813, to December 20, 1813; when Isaac Williams Jr., who had contested the election, was declared entitled to the seat. Afterwards, Bowers resumed his practice of law in Cooperstown.

Bowers died in Cooperstown, New York, and was buried at the Lakewood Cemetery there.

U.S. House of Representatives
Preceded by Peter B. Porter	Member of the U.S. House of Representatives from New York's 15th congressional district 1813 with Joel Thompson	Succeeded by Isaac Williams, Jr., Joel Thompson
