= Ebenezer F. Norton =

American politician

Member of the U.S. House of Representatives from New York's 30th district
- In office March 4, 1829 – March 3, 1831
- Preceded by: Daniel G. Garnsey
- Succeeded by: Bates Cooke

Personal details
- Born: Ebenezer Foote Norton; November 7, 1774 Goshen, Connecticut Colony, British America
- Died: May 11, 1851 (aged 76) Buffalo, New York, U.S.

Ebenezer Foote Norton (November 7, 1774 – May 11, 1851) was an American lawyer, businessman, and politician who served one term as a U.S. representative from New York from 1829 to 1831.

== Biography ==
Born in Goshen in the Connecticut Colony, Norton completed preparatory studies. He studied law. He was admitted to the bar and practiced.

He moved to Buffalo, New York, in 1815. Attorney for the Niagara Bank. He was one of the founders of the original Buffalo Harbor Co. in 1819.

=== Political career ===
He was a member of the New York State Assembly (Erie Co.) in 1823.

Norton was elected as a Jacksonian to the Twenty-first Congress (March 4, 1829 – March 3, 1831). He was an unsuccessful candidate for reelection in 1830 to the Twenty-second Congress.

=== Later career and death ===
He resumed his law practice.

He died in Buffalo, New York, May 11, 1851.

== Sources ==
- United States Congress. "Ebenezer F. Norton (id: N000146)". Biographical Directory of the United States Congress.

U.S. House of Representatives
| Preceded by Daniel G. Garnsey | Member of the U.S. House of Representatives from New York's 30th congressional district 1829–1831 | Succeeded by Bates Cooke |
