= Daniel G. Garnsey =

American politician (1779–1851)

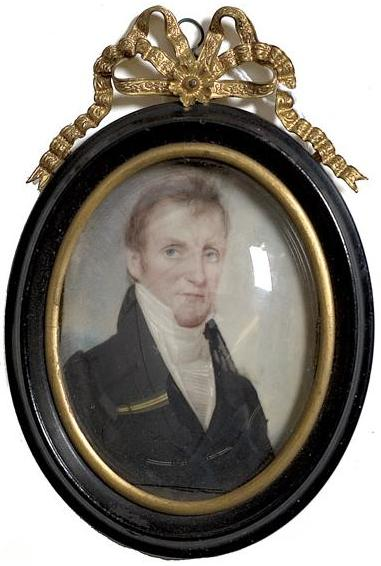
- Daniel G. Garnsey, watercolor miniature, 1828.

Member of the U.S. House of Representatives from New York's 30th district
- In office March 4, 1825 – March 3, 1829
- Preceded by: Albert H. Tracy
- Succeeded by: Ebenezer F. Norton

Personal details
- Born: June 17, 1779 New Lebanon, New York, U.S.
- Died: May 11, 1851 (aged 71) Gowanda, New York, U.S.
- Party: Adams Republican (While in Congress)
- Spouse: Lucy Hudson (1779–1870)
- Children: 8
- Occupation: Attorney

Daniel Greene Garnsey (June 17, 1779 – May 11, 1851) was an American politician from New York, Michigan and Illinois.

== Early life ==
Garnsey was born in the part of the Town of Canaan, New York which is now New Lebanon on June 17, 1779. He was the son of Isaac B. Garnsey (1758–1824) and Elizabeth (Spier) Garnsey (1754–1838). On April 26, 1803, he married Lucy Hudson (1779–1870) in Troy, and they had eight children. Later he moved to Halfmoon.

== Military service ==
Garnsey joined the New York State Militia in 1805. He was Brigade Inspector of Saratoga County from 1810 to 1811, fought as a major in the War of 1812, and was Brigade Inspector of Chautauqua County in 1817.

== Career ==
He studied law in Norwich, was admitted to the bar in 1811 and practiced in Rensselaer and Saratoga counties. Originally a member of the Federalist Party, he served in local and judicial office, including justice of the peace, inspector of the common schools, Master in Chancery and Saratoga County Surrogate.

In 1816, he moved to the area in the Town of Pomfret which later became the Village of Dunkirk. He was Surrogate of Chautauqua County from 1819 to 1821, and District Attorney from 1818 to 1826.

Garnsey was elected as an Adams candidate to the 19th and 20th United States Congresses, holding office from March 4, 1825, to March 3, 1829. In 1828, he ran unsuccessfully for re-election as an independent candidate with the support of the Anti-Masonic Party, even though he had been a Mason himself.

During the 1828 campaign, when Anti-Masons were considering whether to support John Quincy Adams for reelection as president, Garnsey wrote a letter to Adams to ask whether he was a Mason. Adams replied that he was not a Mason, but had known several individuals who were, including George Washington, and had no negative comments about them. Garnsey's letter and Adams' reply were made public in Anti-Masonic newspapers. Because Adams' opponent Andrew Jackson was a Mason, while Adams was not, Anti-Masons supported Adams.

In 1831, Garnsey moved to Battle Creek, Michigan. He was Postmaster, and Government Superintendent of Public Works near Detroit and Ypsilanti. He served with Winfield Scott in the Black Hawk War in 1832.

Garnsey became a Whig when the party was founded in the 1830s, and he was a supporter of the presidential candidacies of Henry Clay and William Henry Harrison.

He later moved to Rock Island, Illinois. On March 22, 1841, he was appointed by Harrison as Receiver of Public Moneys at the Land Office in Dixon, Illinois, and served until removed by President John Tyler on August 25, 1843. When Harrison died in 1841 after only a few weeks in office, Garnsey was one of the official pallbearers at Harrison's funeral.

== Death and burial ==
Garnsey died suddenly in Gowanda, New York on May 11, 1851 while traveling from his daughter's home in Philadelphia to Dunkirk, where he was planning to attend the celebration of the completion of the Erie Railroad. He was buried at the Pine Hill Cemetery in Gowanda.

== Note ==
Some sources indicate that Garnsey served in Congress as a Jacksonian. These sources seem to be incorrect, given that contemporary sources from the time of Garnsey's career indicate that he was a Federalist, and then an Adams Republican, and that he later became affiliated with the Anti-Masons and then the Whigs.

== Sources ==
- United States Congress. "Daniel G. Garnsey (id: G000078)". Biographical Directory of the United States Congress.
- The New York Civil List compiled by Franklin Benjamin Hough (pages 71f, 371 and 412; Weed, Parsons and Co., 1858)
- The Garnsey-Guernsey Genealogy by Eva Louise Garnsey Card, Howard Abram Guernsey & Judith L. Young-Thayer (page 299)
- Garnsey genealogy at Family Tree Maker

U.S. House of Representatives
| Preceded by Albert H. Tracy | Member of the U.S. House of Representatives from New York's 30th congressional district 1825–1829 | Succeeded by Ebenezer F. Norton |
