= 1848 Whig National Convention =

U.S. political event held in Philadelphia, Pennsylvania

- 1848 presidential election
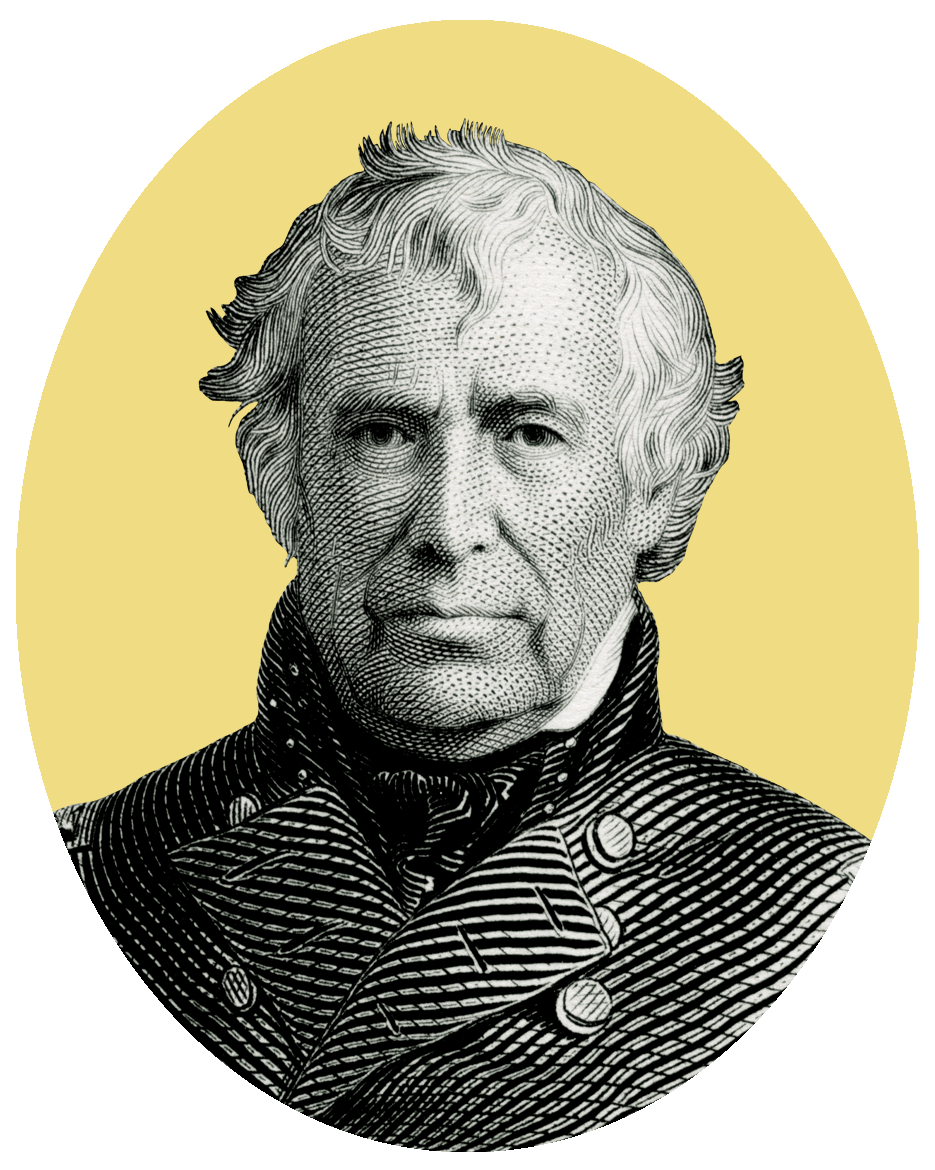
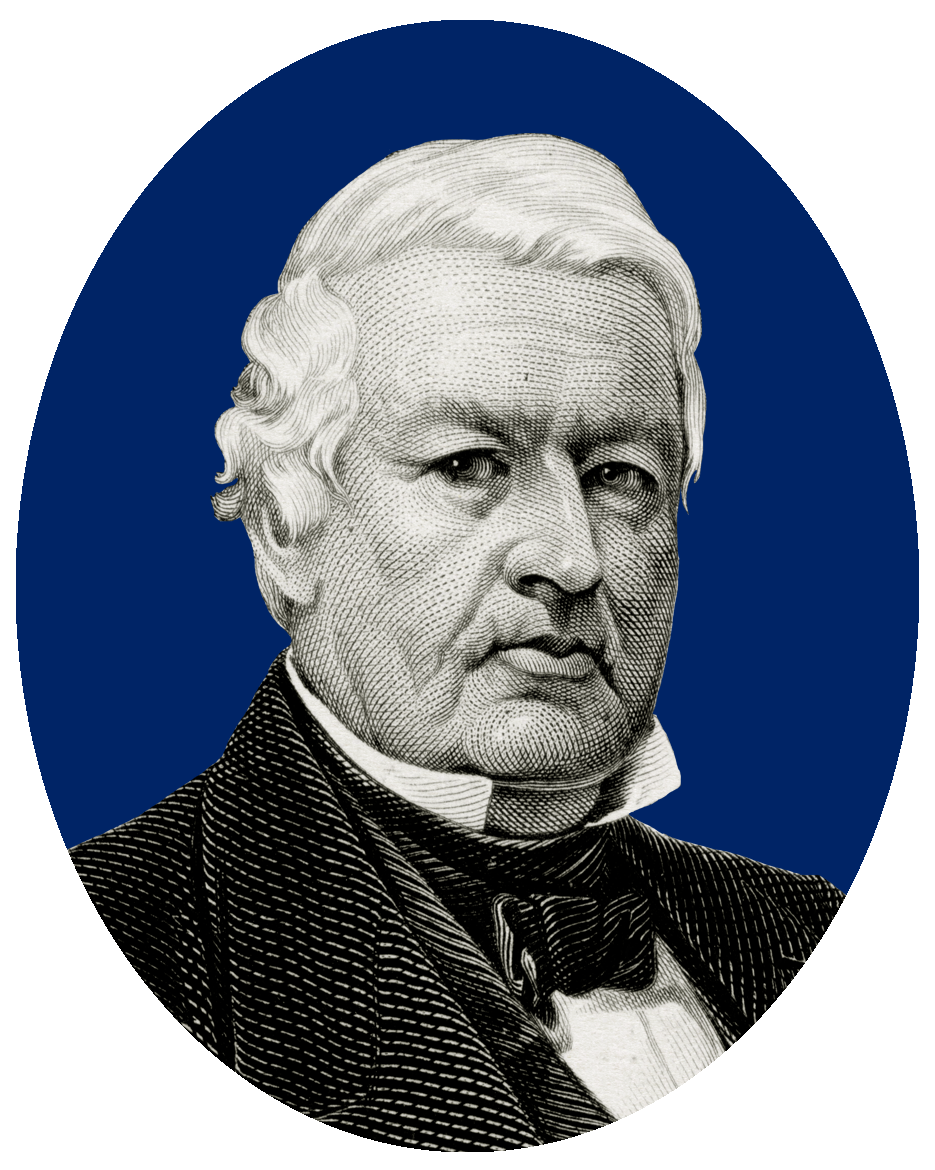
- Nominees; Taylor and Fillmore

Convention
- Date(s): June 7–9, 1848
- City: Philadelphia, Pennsylvania
- Venue: Chinese Museum Building

Candidates
- Presidential nominee: Zachary Taylor of Louisiana
- Vice-presidential nominee: Millard Fillmore of New York

Voting
- Total delegates: 280
- Votes needed for nomination: 140
- Results (president): Taylor (LA): 171 (61.07%); Scott (NY): 63 (22.5%); Clay (KY): 32 (11.43%); Webster (MA): 14 (5%)
- Ballots: 4

The 1848 Whig National Convention was a presidential nominating convention held from June 7 to 9 in Philadelphia. It nominated the Whig Party's candidates for president and vice president in the 1848 election. The convention selected General Zachary Taylor of Louisiana for president and former Representative Millard Fillmore of New York for vice president.

Taylor and General Winfield Scott had both emerged as contenders for the Whig presidential nomination after serving in the Mexican–American War, while two long-time party leaders, Senator Henry Clay of Kentucky and Senator Daniel Webster of Massachusetts, also commanded support in the party. With Southern delegates united around his candidacy, Taylor took the lead on the first ballot. Clay finished a strong second to Taylor on the first ballot of the convention, but his support faded on subsequent ballots and Taylor took the nomination on the fourth ballot.

After Webster declined the vice presidential nomination, Fillmore and businessman Abbott Lawrence of Massachusetts emerged as the top choices for vice president. Fillmore clinched the nomination on the second ballot. The Whig ticket went on to win the 1848 presidential election, defeating the Democratic ticket of Lewis Cass and William O. Butler.

== The Convention ==
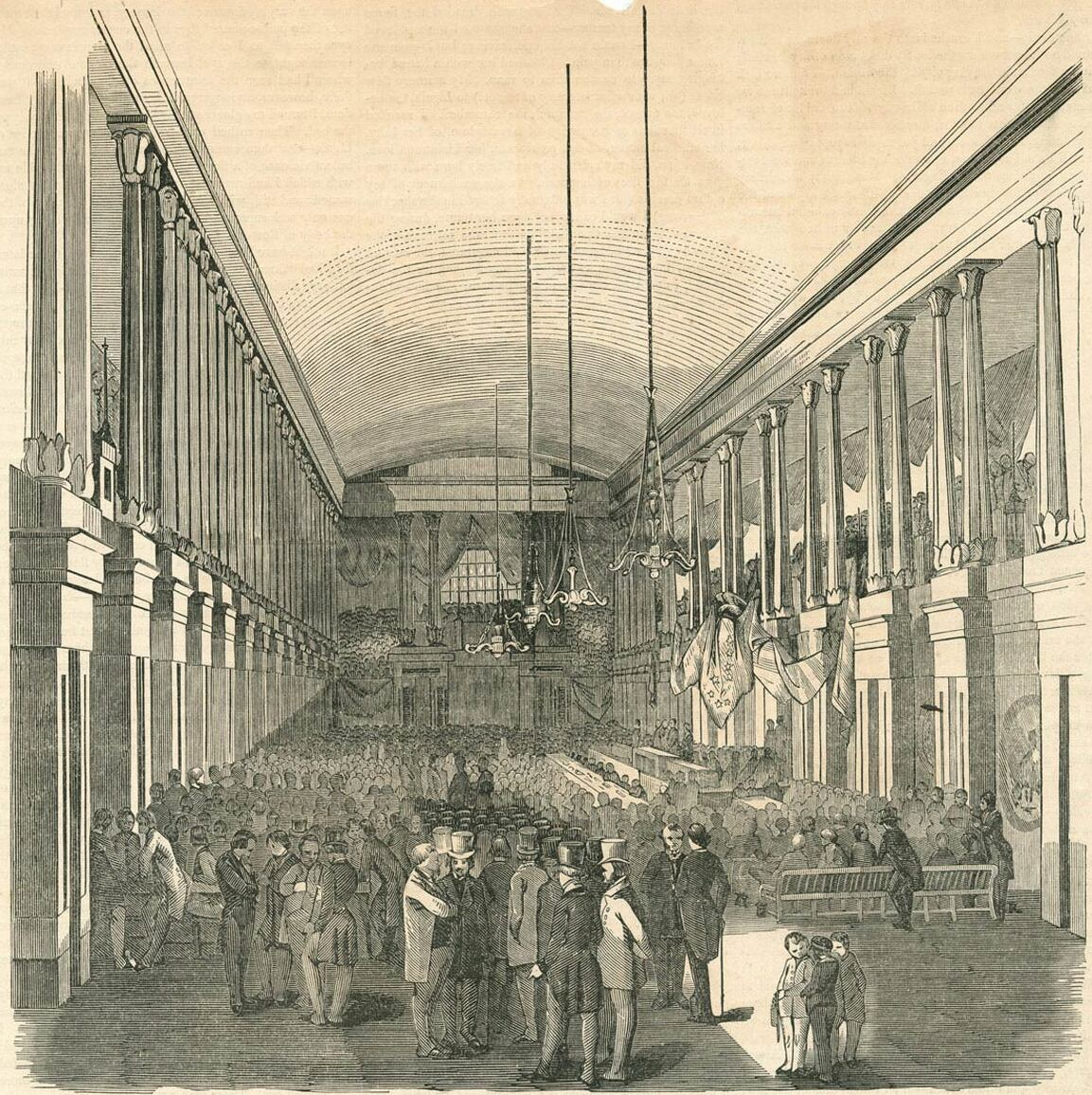
Illustration of the convention

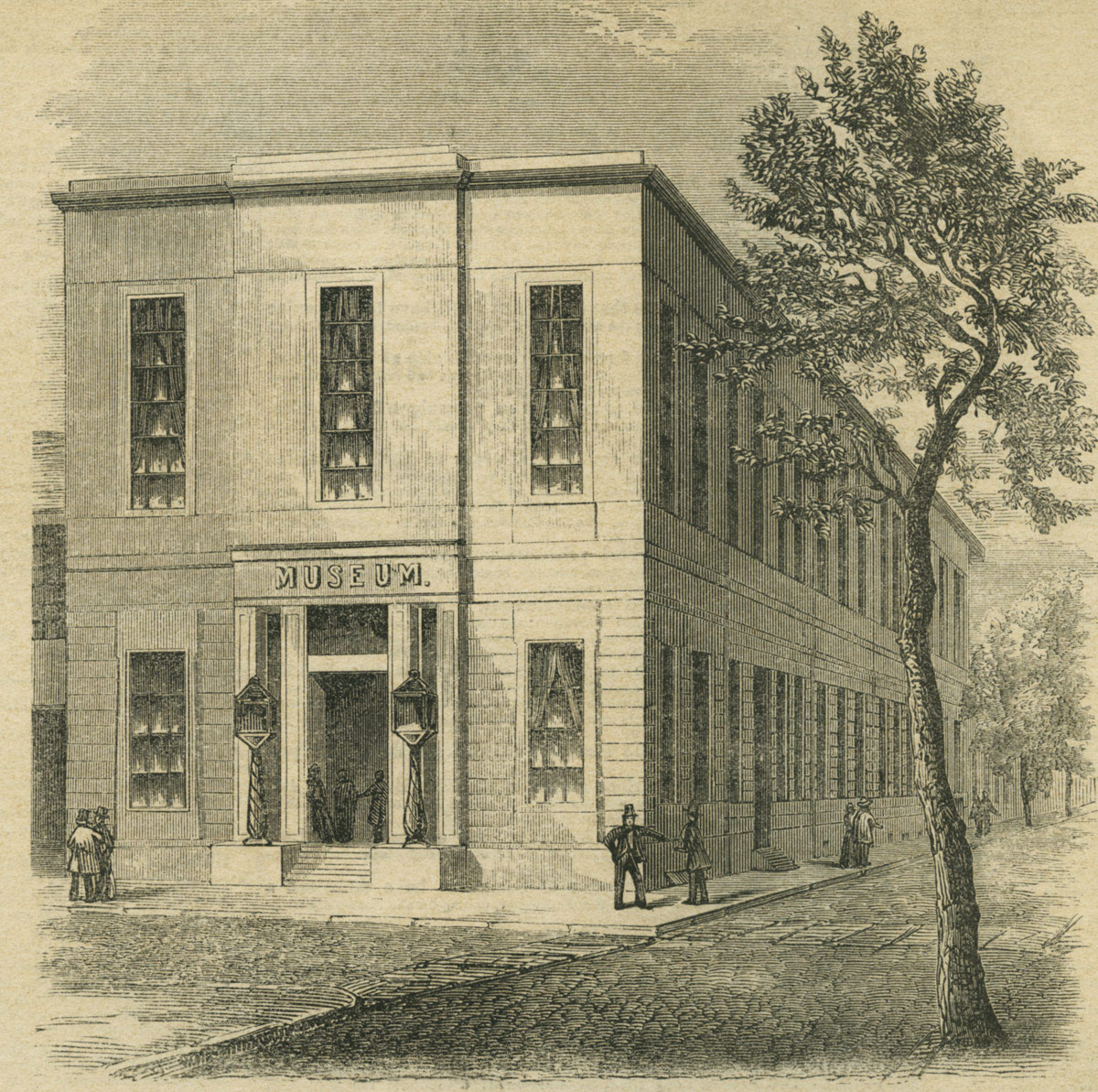
Illustration of the Chinese Museum Building, the venue of the convention

The convention was held from June 7 to 9 in Philadelphia, Pennsylvania. Every state was represented except for Texas. It was chaired by John A. Collier and John M. Morehead. Taylor had been courted by both the Democrats and the Whigs, but ultimately declared himself a Whig. The platform adopted largely consisted of praise for Taylor, with less attention paid to specific policies.

The venue for the convention was the Chinese Museum Building. The building since was destroyed by fire in 1854.

There were 280 individuals seated as delegates to the convention.

== Presidential nomination ==
By 1847, General Zachary Taylor had emerged as a contender for the Whig nomination in the 1848 presidential election. Despite Taylor's largely unknown political views, many Whigs believed he was the party's strongest possible candidate due to his martial accomplishments in the Mexican–American War. Henry Clay initially told his allies that he would not run in the 1848 presidential election, but he was unwilling to support Taylor, a "mere military man.". Although Daniel Webster and General Winfield Scott each commanded a limited base of support in the party, Taylor and Clay each saw the other as their lone serious rival for the Whig nomination.

Taylor led on the first ballot and grew his lead on subsequent ballots. On the fourth ballot, he secured 171 votes and won the presidential nomination.

=== Candidates ===
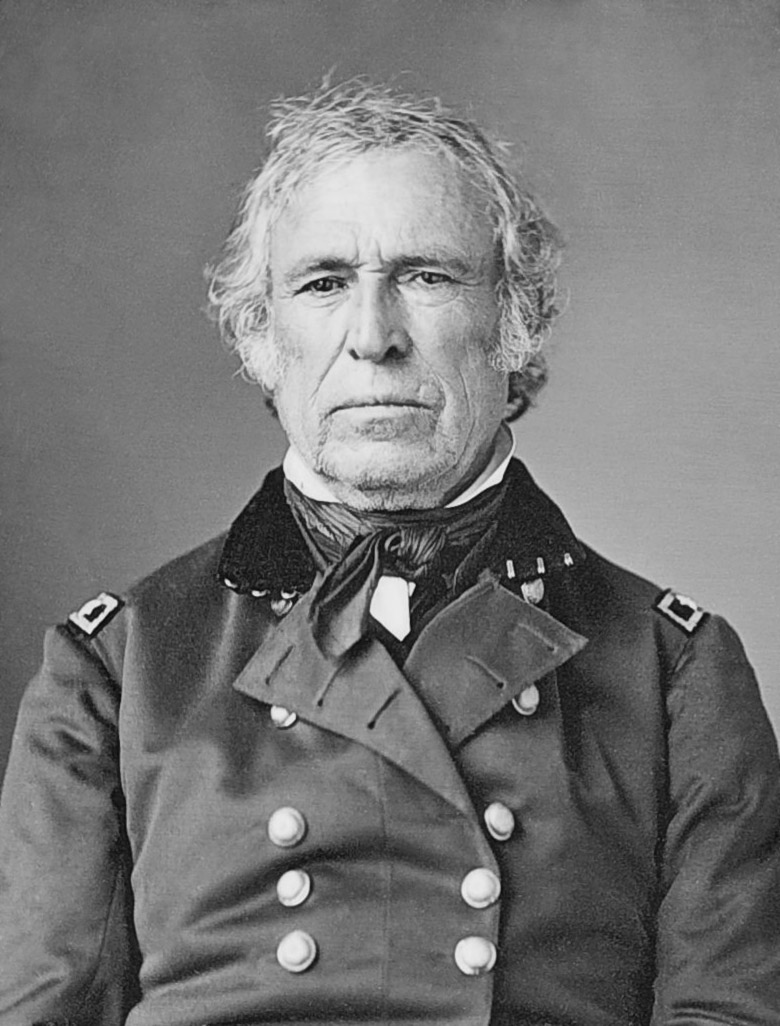
General
Zachary Taylor
of Louisiana

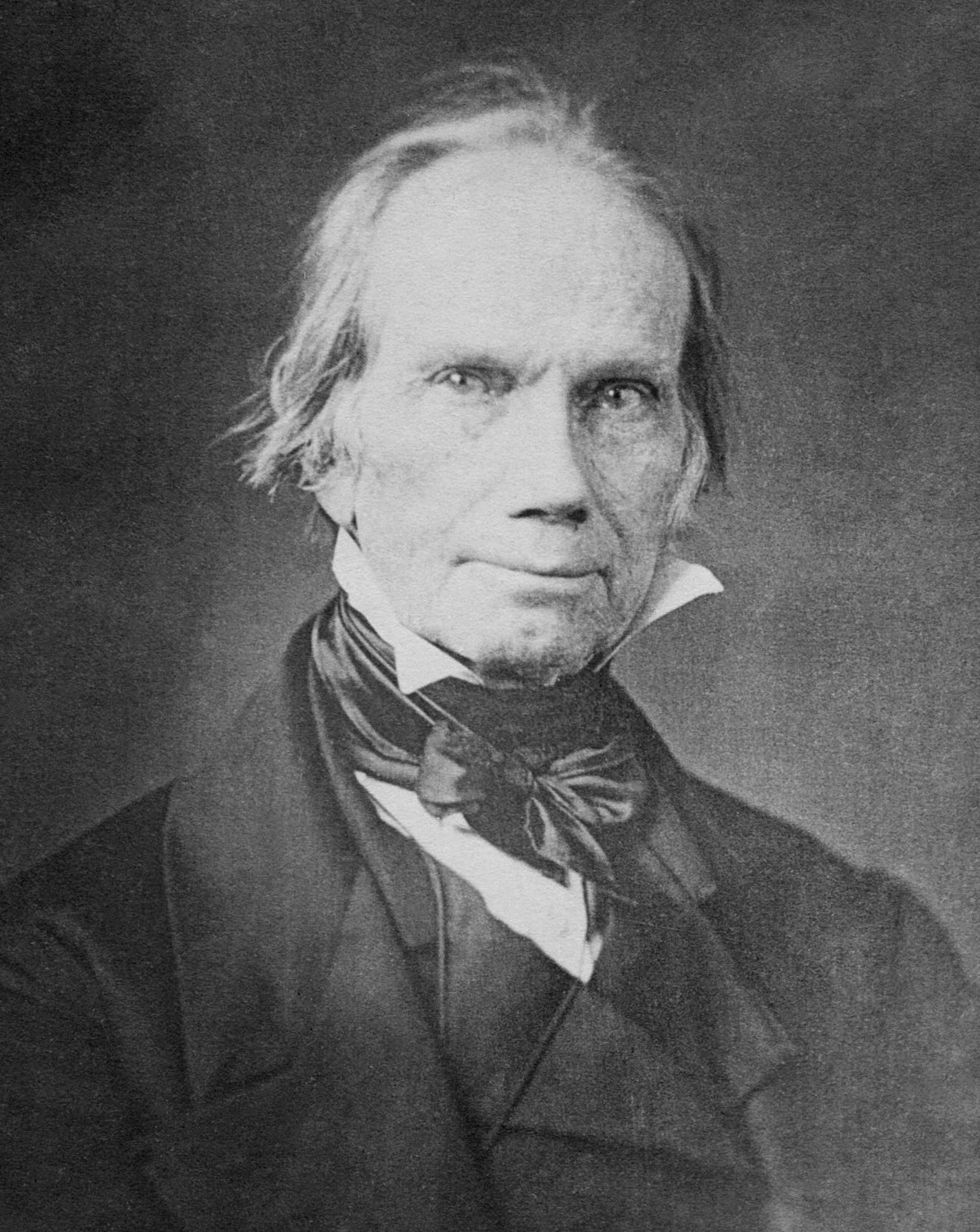
Former Senator
Henry Clay
of Kentucky

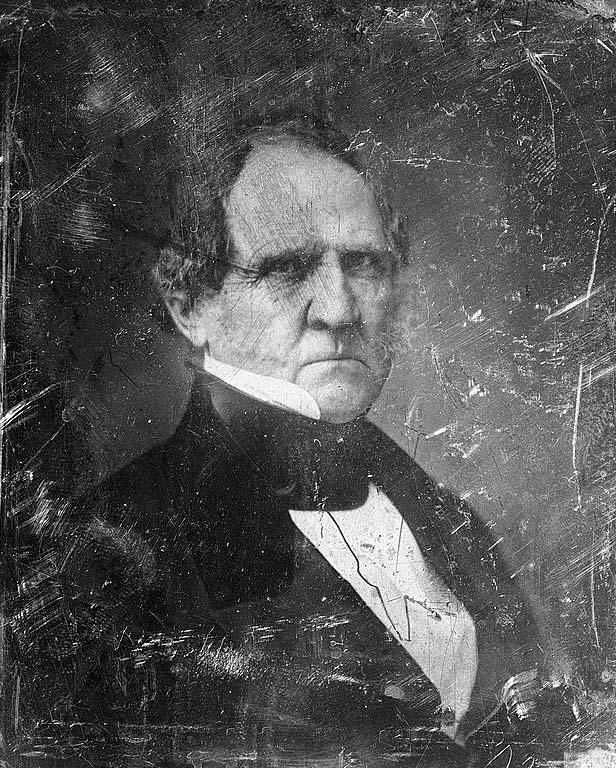
General
Winfield Scott
of New York

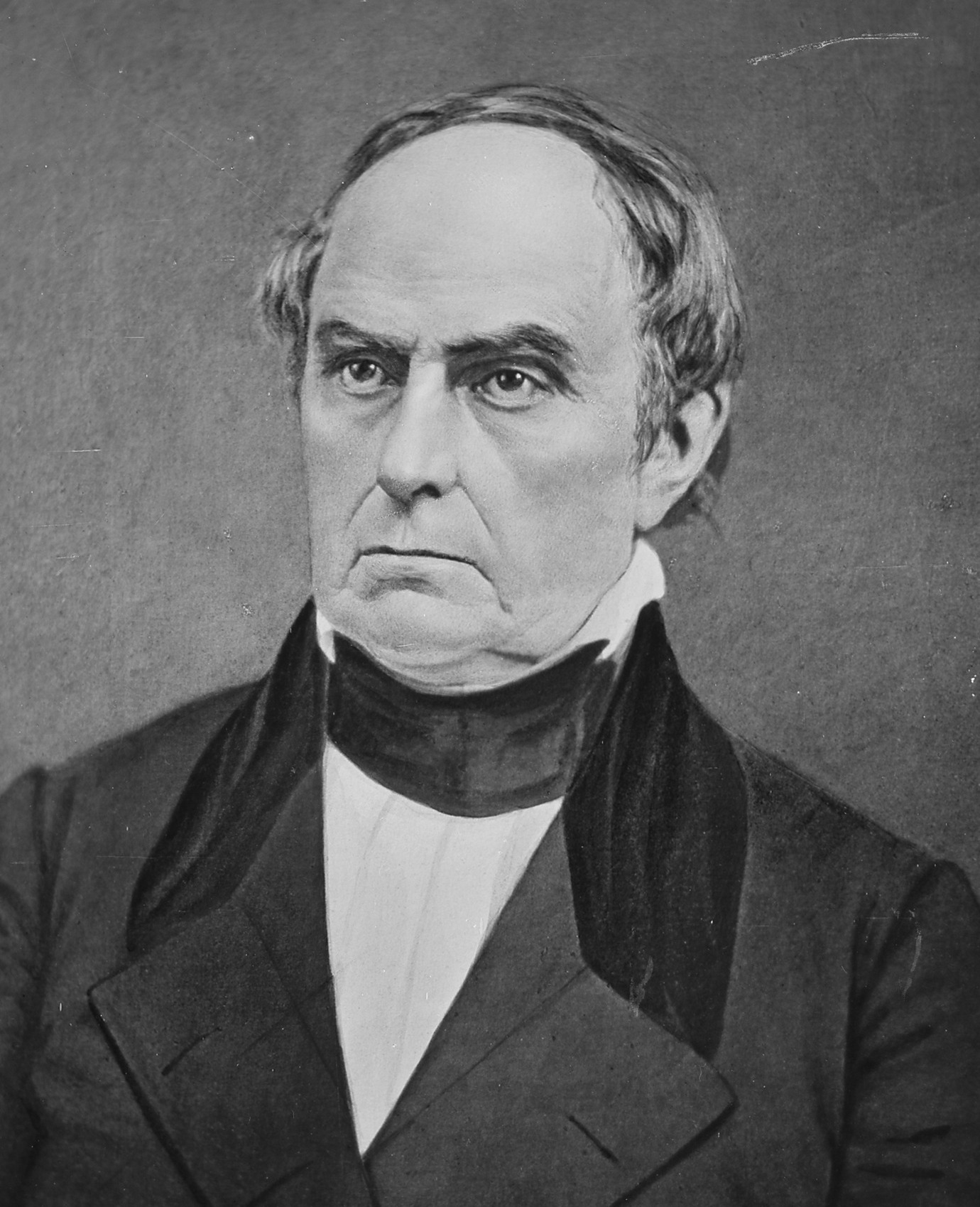
Senator
Daniel Webster
of Massachusetts

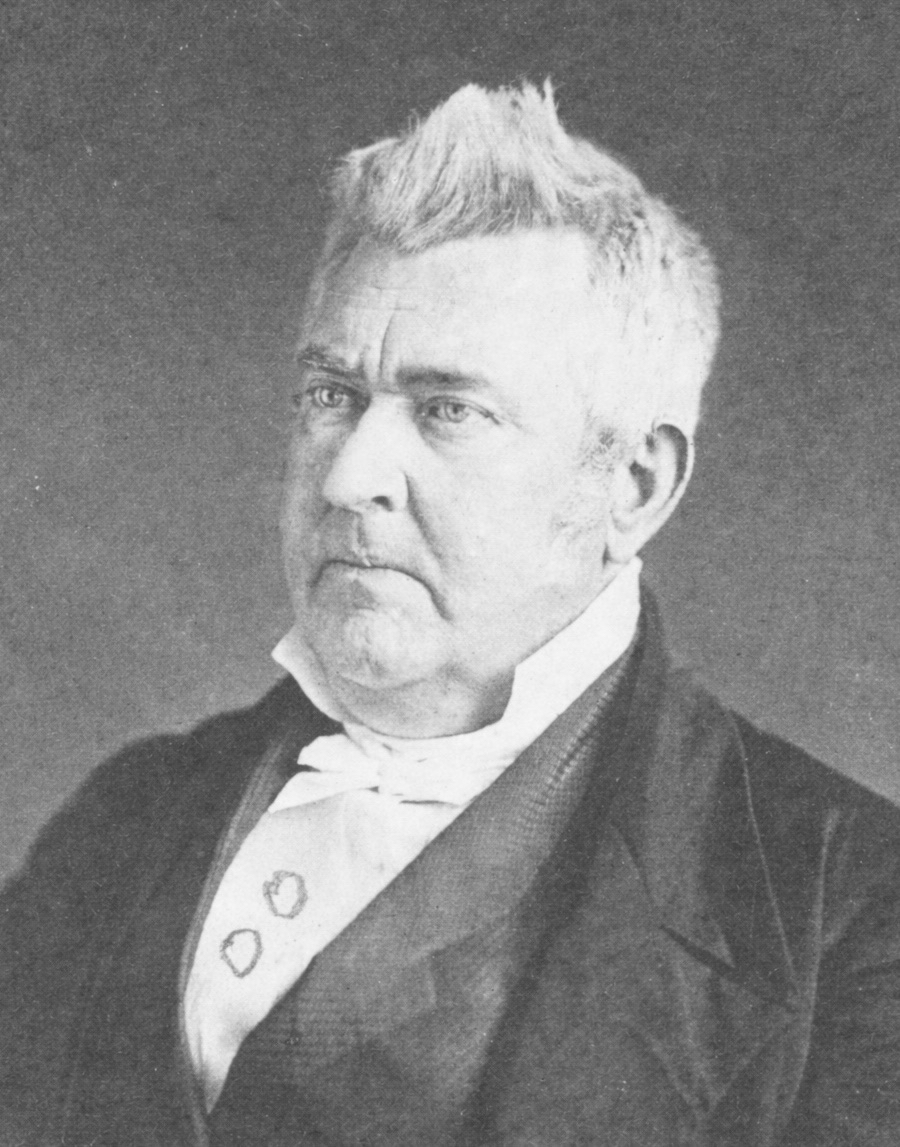
Senator
John M. Clayton
of Delaware

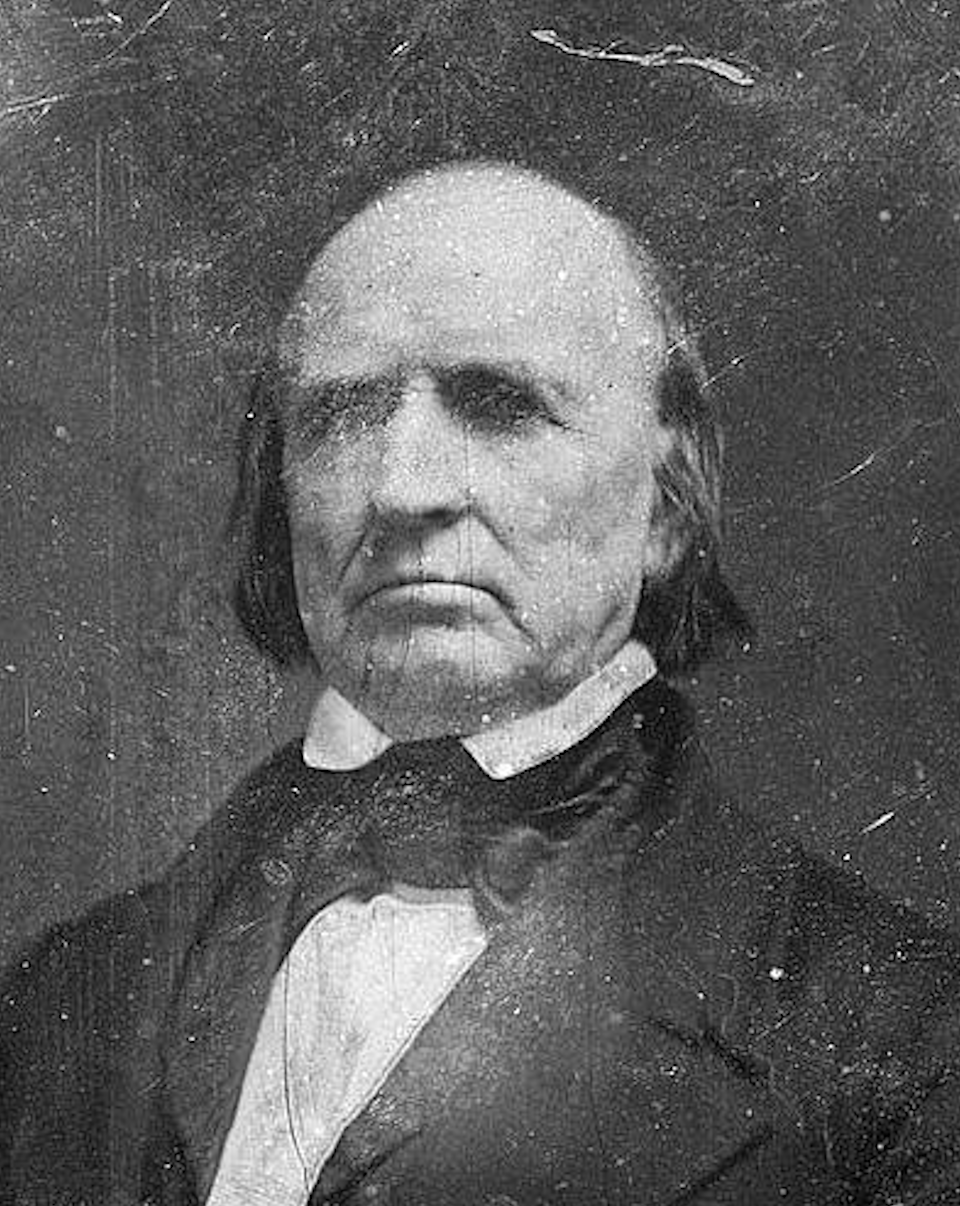
Associate Justice
John McLean
of Ohio

=== Nomination ===
Presidential nomination
Candidate	1st	2nd	3rd	4th
Zachary Taylor of Louisiana	111	118	133	171
Henry Clay of Kentucky	97	86	74	32
Winfield Scott of New York	43	49	54	63
Daniel Webster of Massachusetts	22	22	17	14
John M. Clayton of Delaware	4	4	1	—N/a
John McLean of Ohio	2	—N/a	—N/a	—N/a
Total	279	279	279	280
Majority	140	140	140	141
Not voting	1	1	1	—N/a

=== Maps ===
1st presidential ballot: results by state

2nd presidential ballot: results by state

3rd presidential ballot: results by state

4th presidential ballot: results by state

== Vice Presidential nomination ==
=== Vice Presidential candidates ===
Whig Party leader Thurlow Weed hoped to secure the vice presidency for former New York governor William H. Seward, a vocal opponent of slavery, or to have him appointed U.S. Secretary of State. New Yorkers opposed to Seward promoted Millard Fillmore, the New York State Comptroller, for vice president; under the conventions of the time, two top positions could not go to individuals from the same state. Former congressman Solomon Foot of Vermont went to the convention as a supporter of Abbott Lawrence for vice president. As a key Taylor supporter, Lawrence expected to be nominated. Northern anti-slavery delegates perceived Lawrence as more accepting of slavery than Fillmore. Recognizing that the Whigs would likely collapse if Lawrence was nominated and the northern anti-slavery delegates left the party, or if southern delegates left following a Seward nomination, Foot agreed to shift his support to Fillmore. Lawrence's support eroded as other northern delegates followed Foot's lead, and on the first ballot, Fillmore had 115 votes and Lawrence 109. (Seward was subsequently elected to the U.S. Senate for the term starting in March 1849.)

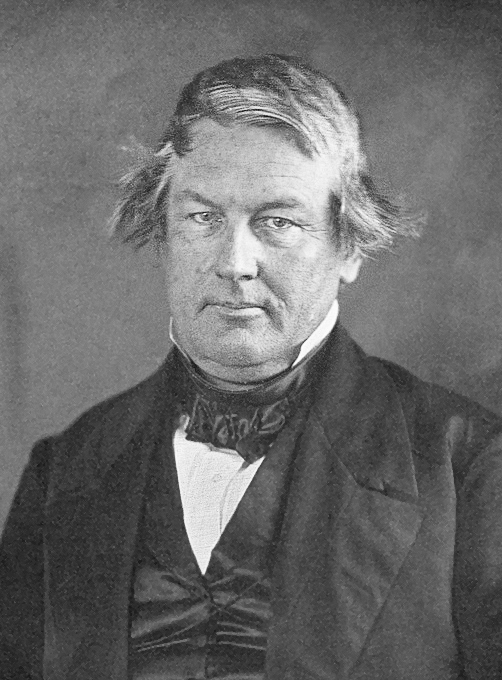
Comptroller
Millard Fillmore
of New York

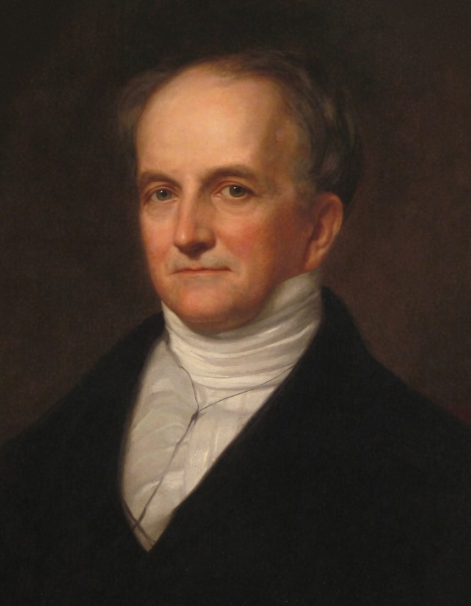
Former Representative
Abbott Lawrence
of Massachusetts

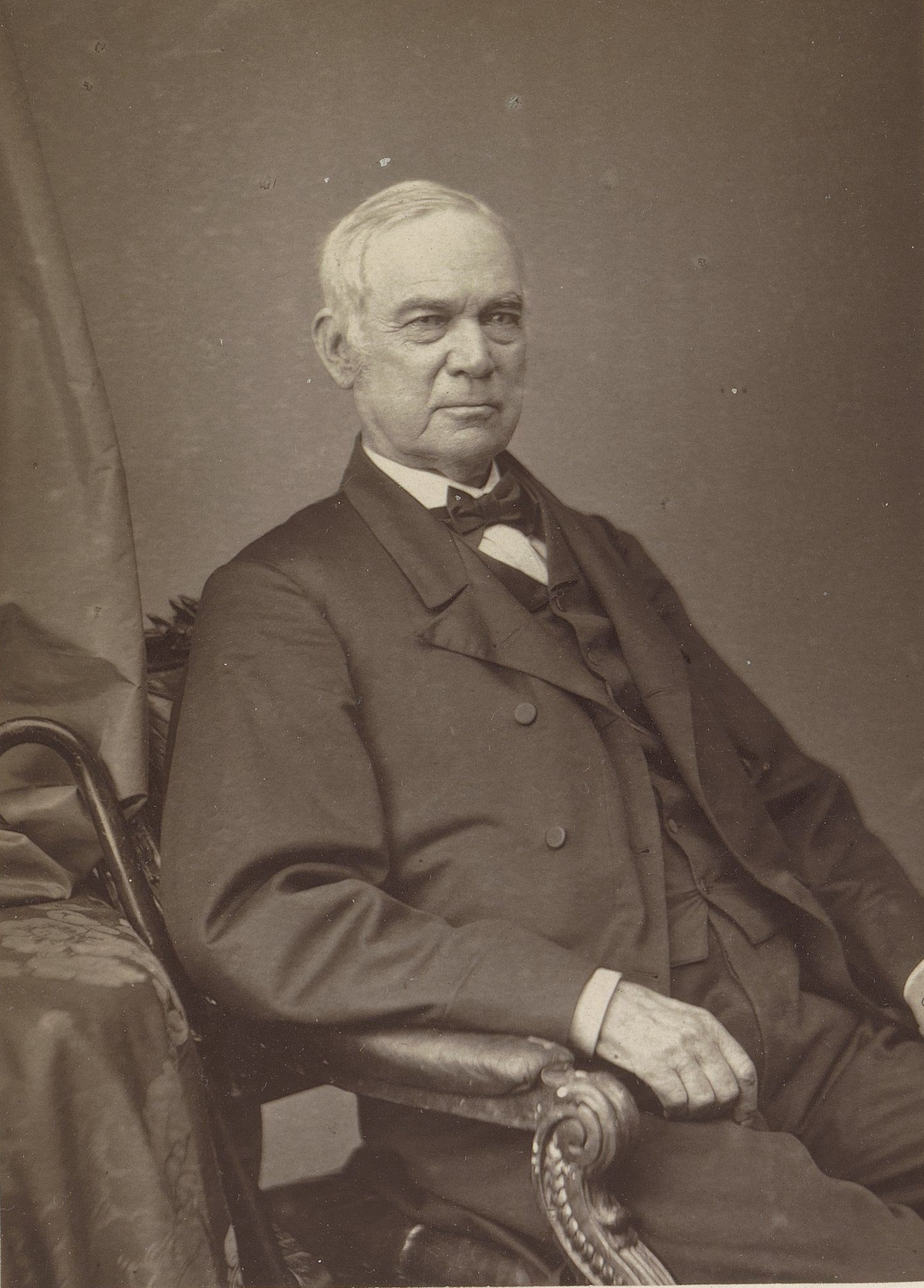
Representative
Andrew Stewart
of Pennsylvania

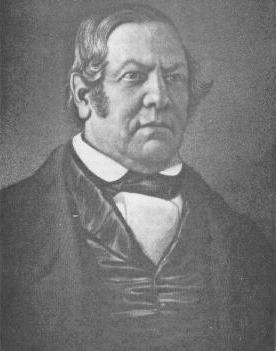
Former Representative
Thomas McKennan
of Pennsylvania

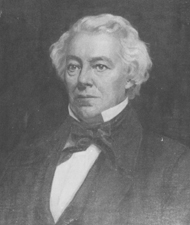
Former Senator
George Evans
of Maine

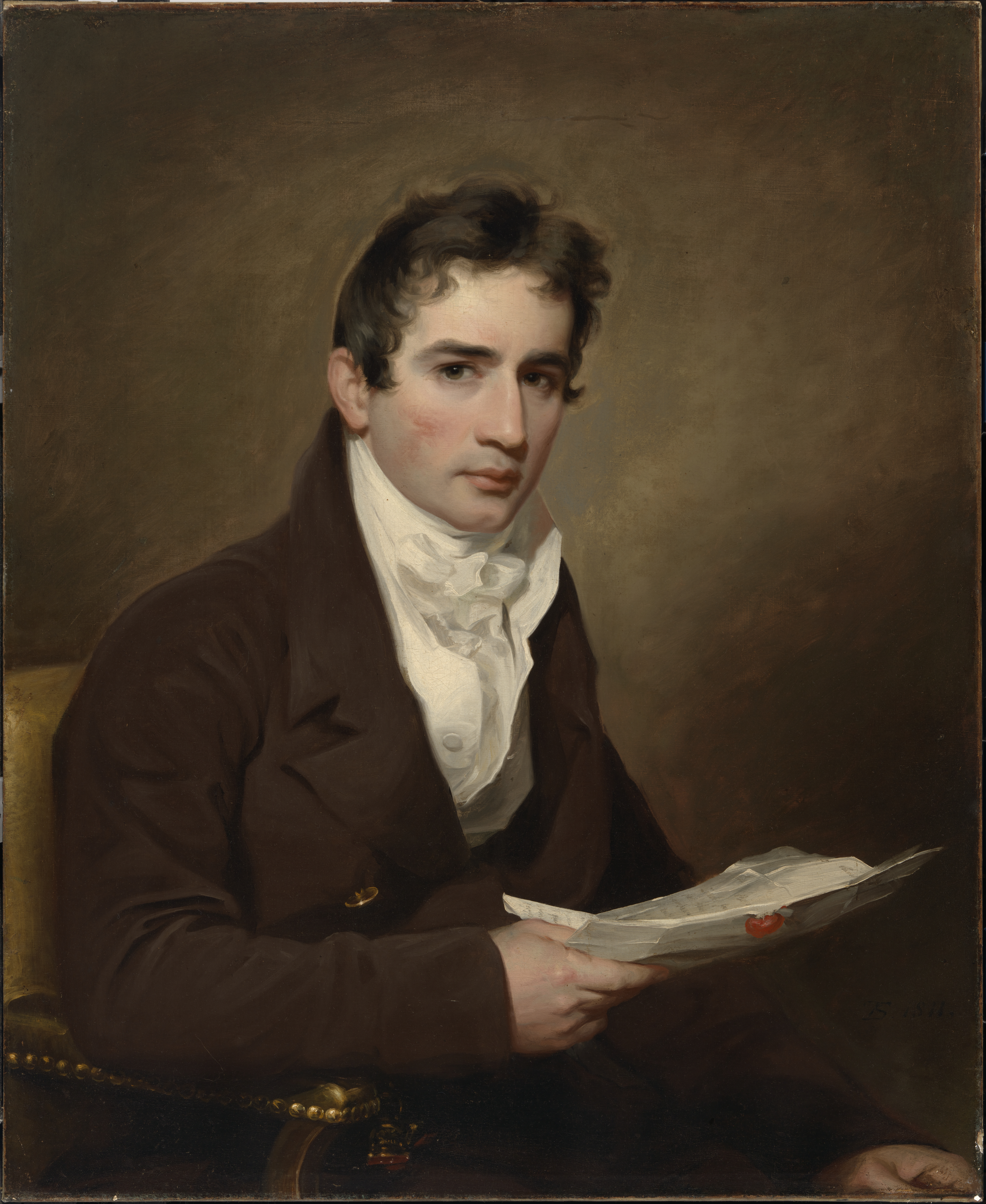
Former Representative
John Sergeant
of Pennsylvania

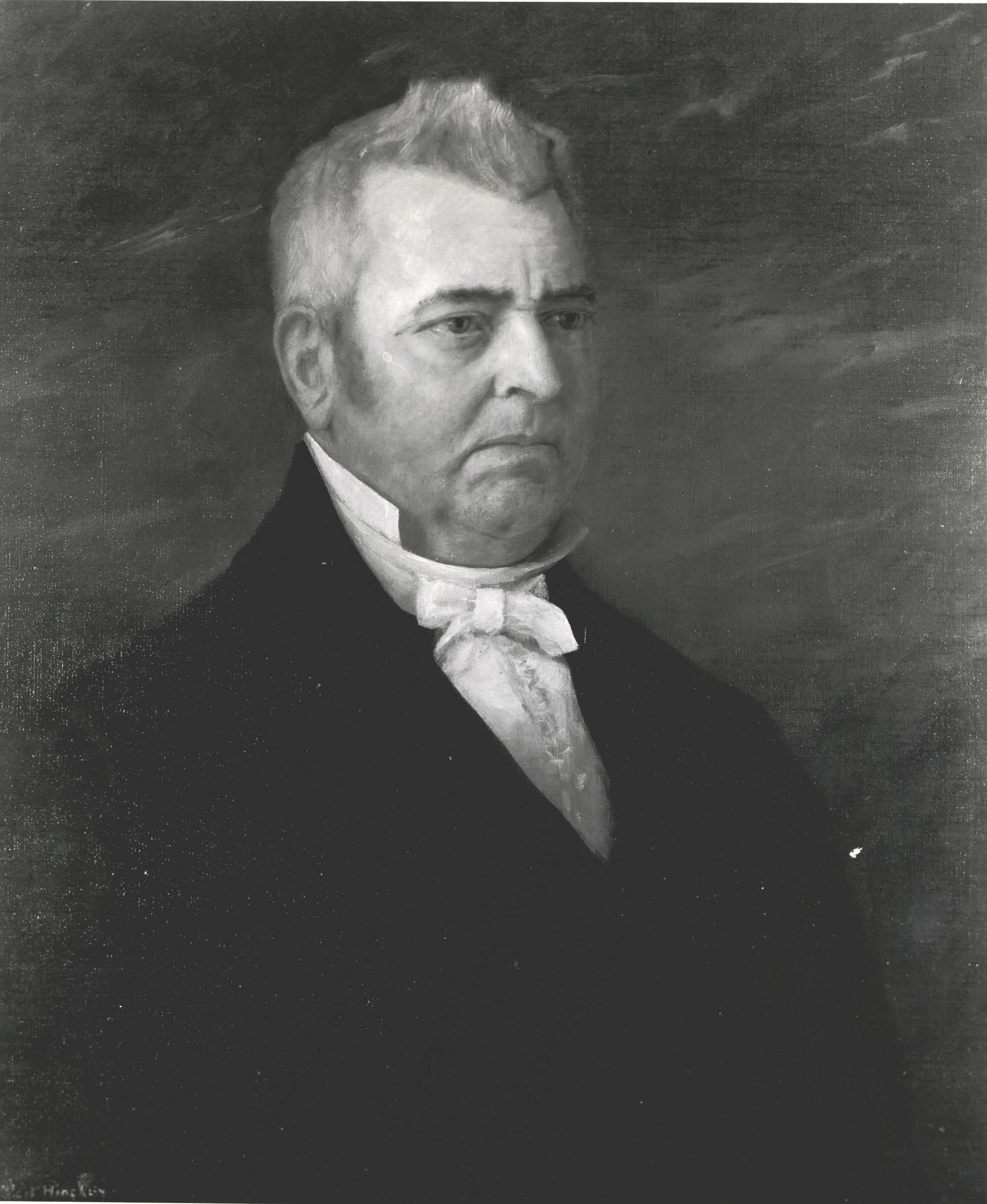
Senator
John M. Clayton
of Delaware

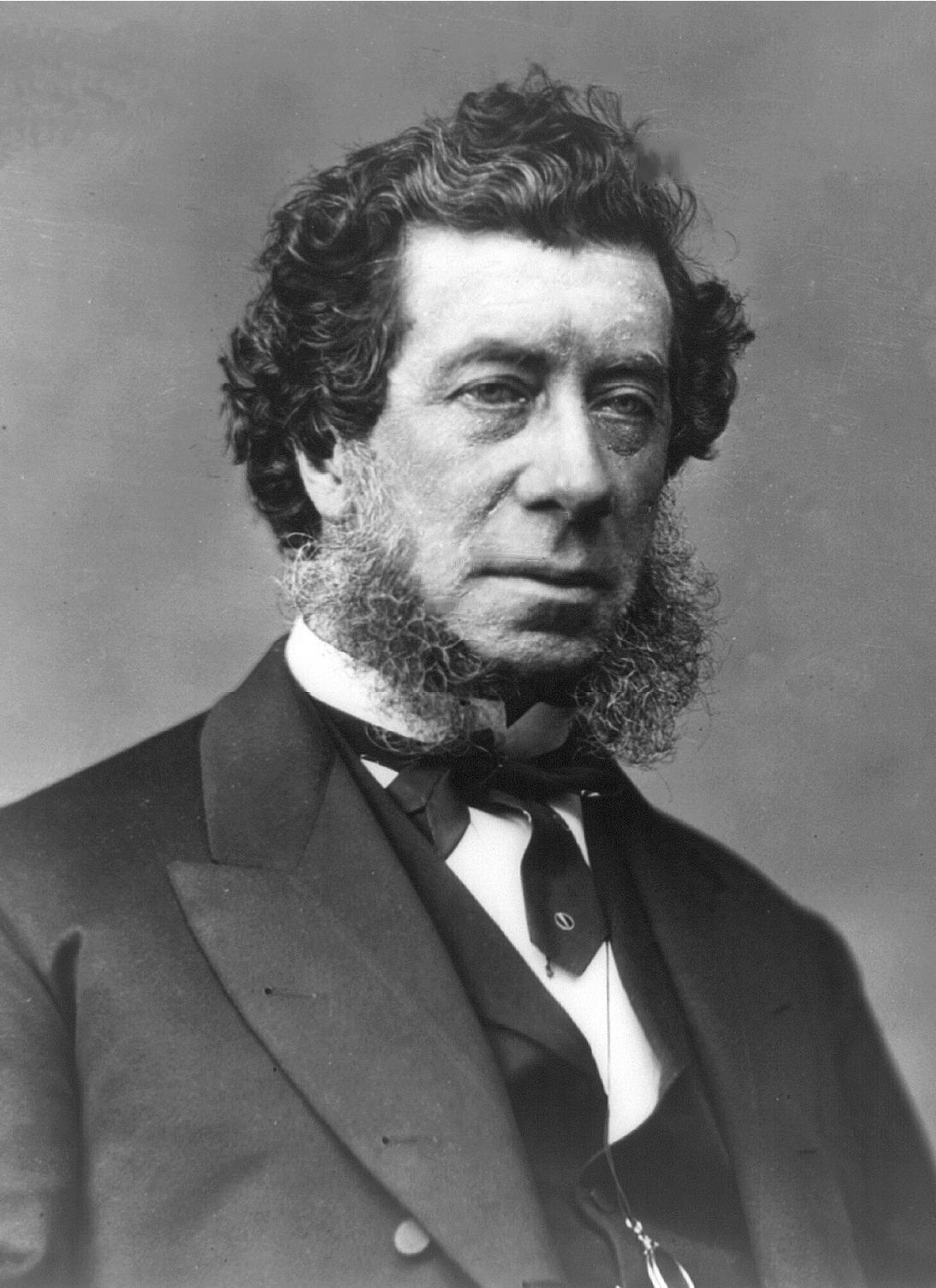
Lieutenant Governor
Hamilton Fish
of New York

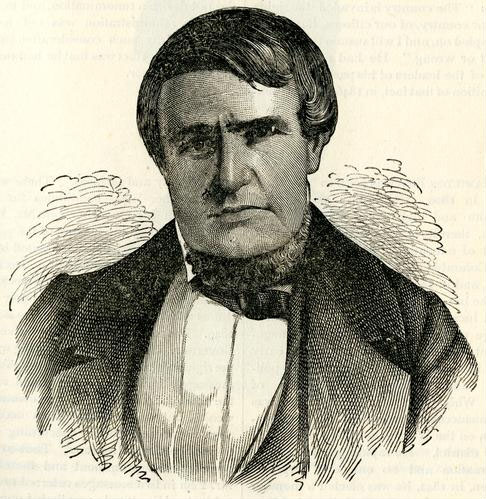
Governor
John Young
of New York

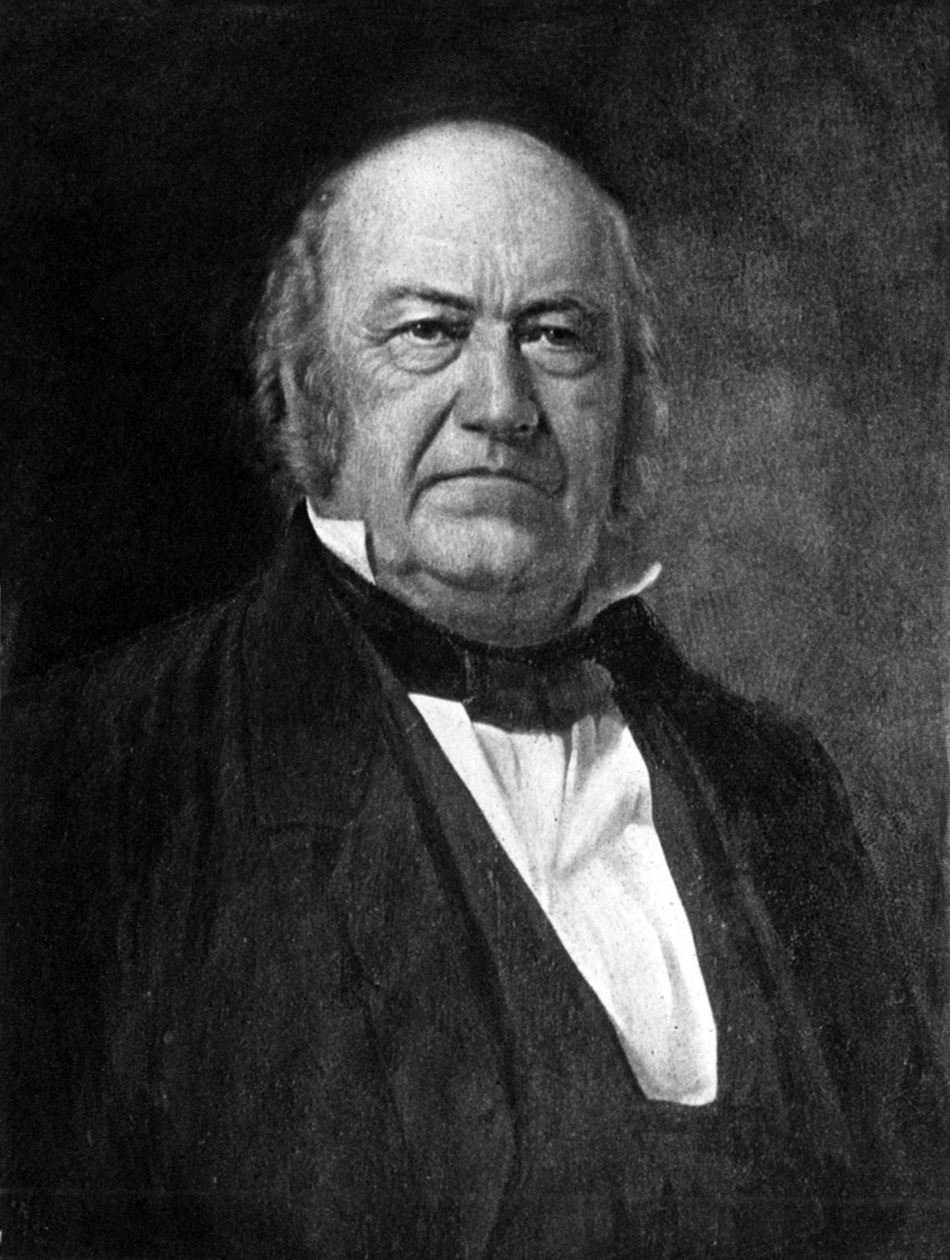
Former Senator
Thomas Ewing
of Ohio

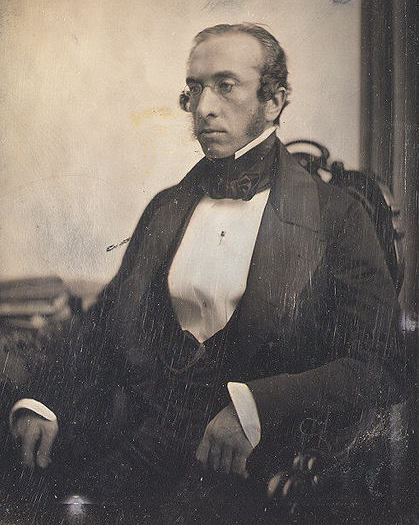
Speaker
Robert C. Winthrop
of Massachusetts

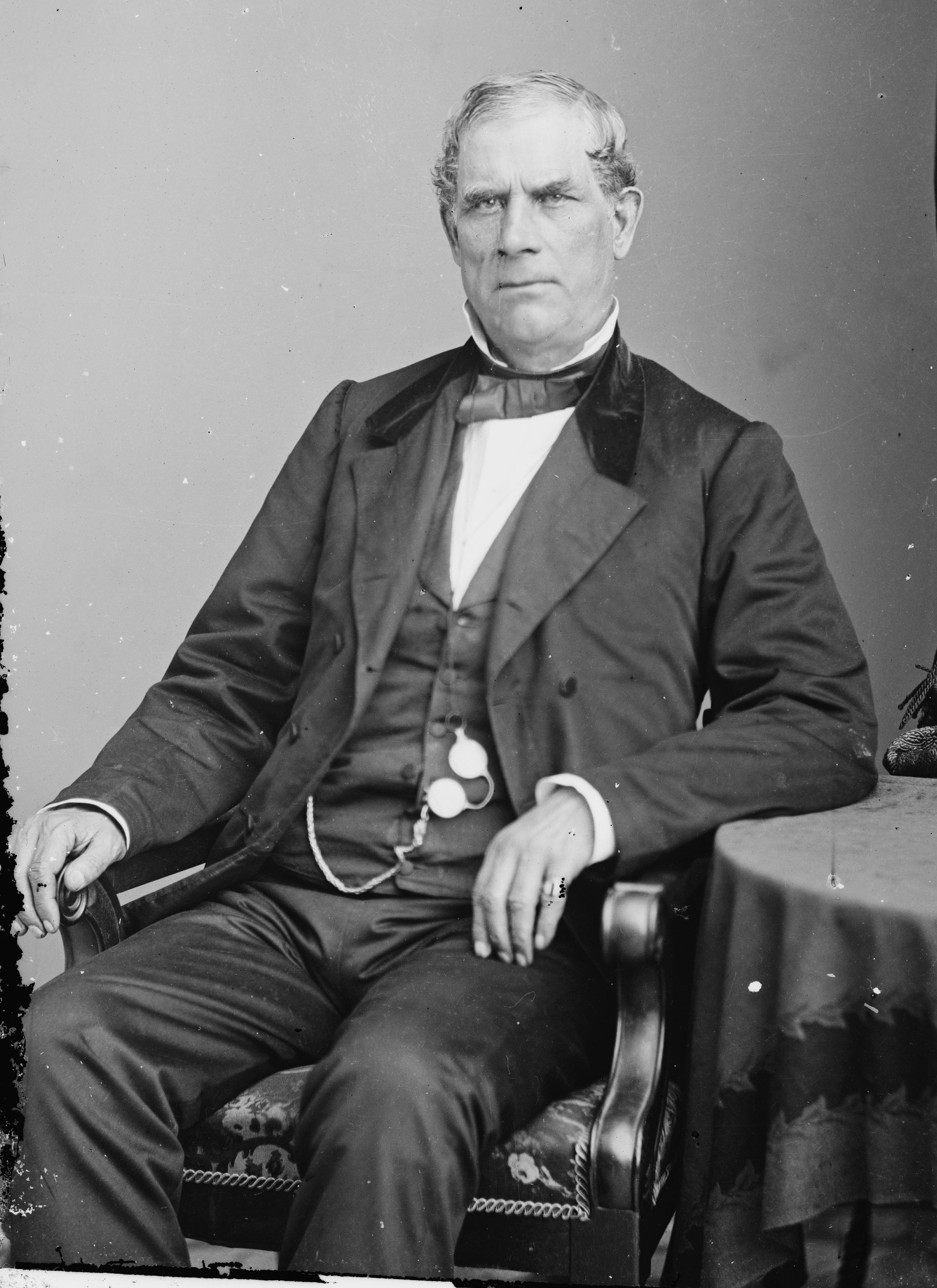
Publisher
Thurlow Weed
of New York

=== Withdrawn ===
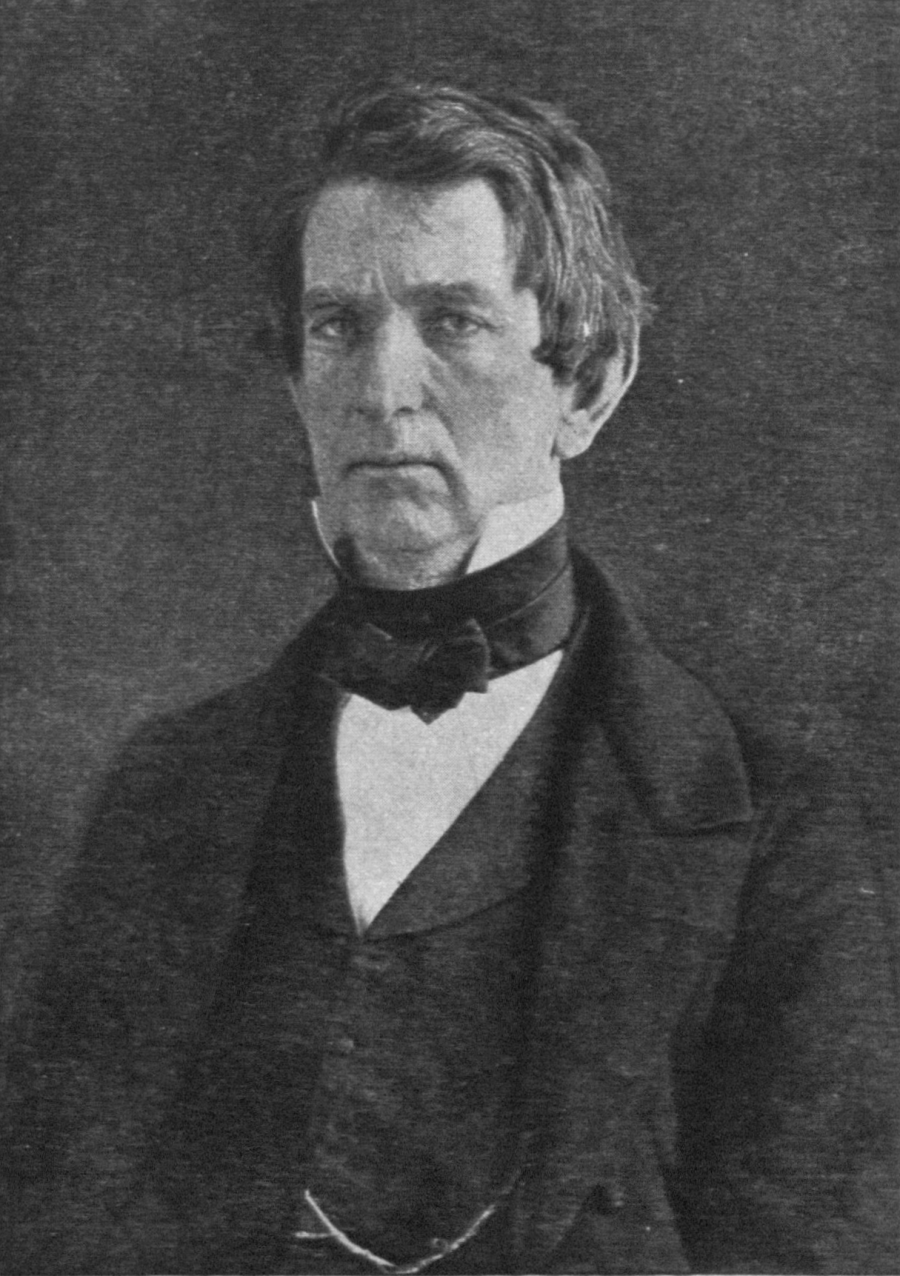
Former Governor
William H. Seward
of New York

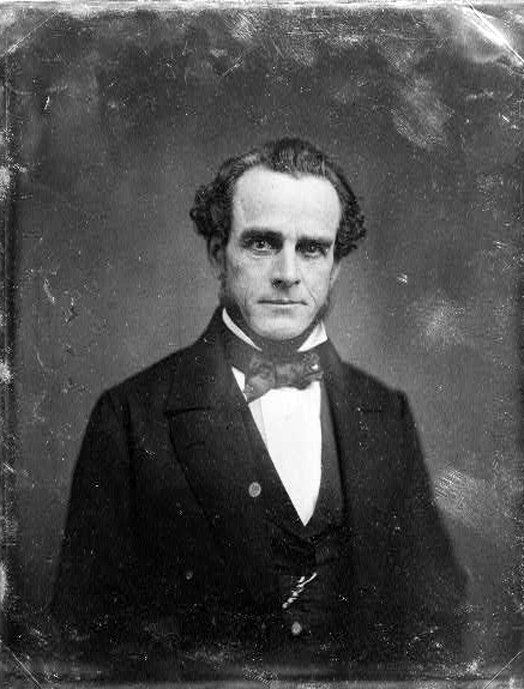
Representative
Thomas B. King
of Georgia

=== Declined ===
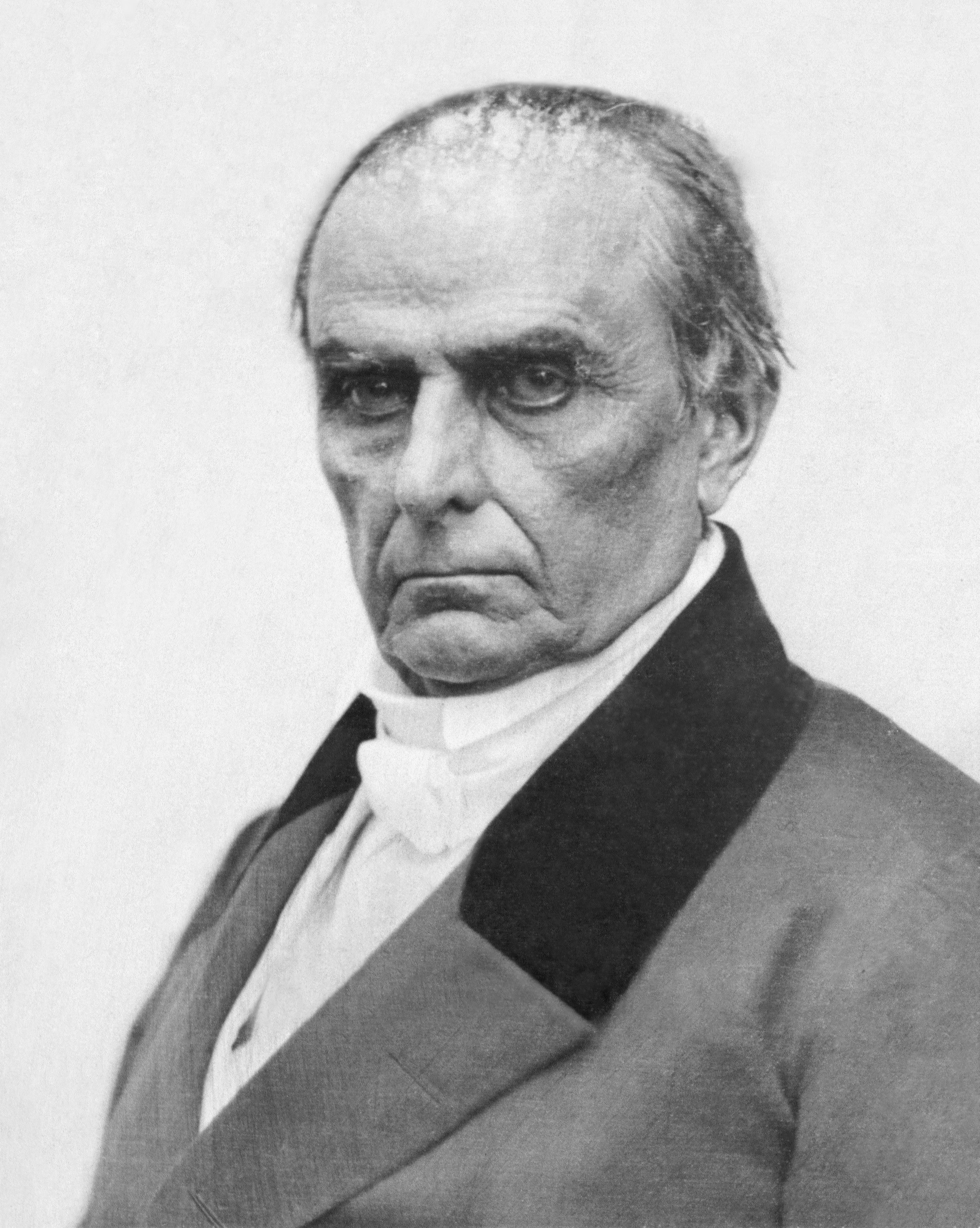
Senator
Daniel Webster
of Massachusetts

=== Balloting ===
Webster was offered the vice presidential spot on the ticket, but declined. Former New York Representative Millard Fillmore was chosen as the vice presidential candidate on the second ballot.

Convention Vice Presidential vote
Ballots	1	2
Millard Fillmore	115	173
Abbott Lawrence	109	87
Not Voting	16	24
Andrew Stewart	14	0
Thomas M.T. McKennan	13	0
George Evans	6	2
John Sergeant	6	1
John M. Clayton	3	3
Hamilton Fish	2	0
Thomas Ewing Sr.	1	0
Thomas B. King	1	0
John Young	1	0
Rufus Choate	1	0
Solomon Foot	1	0
George Lunt	1	0

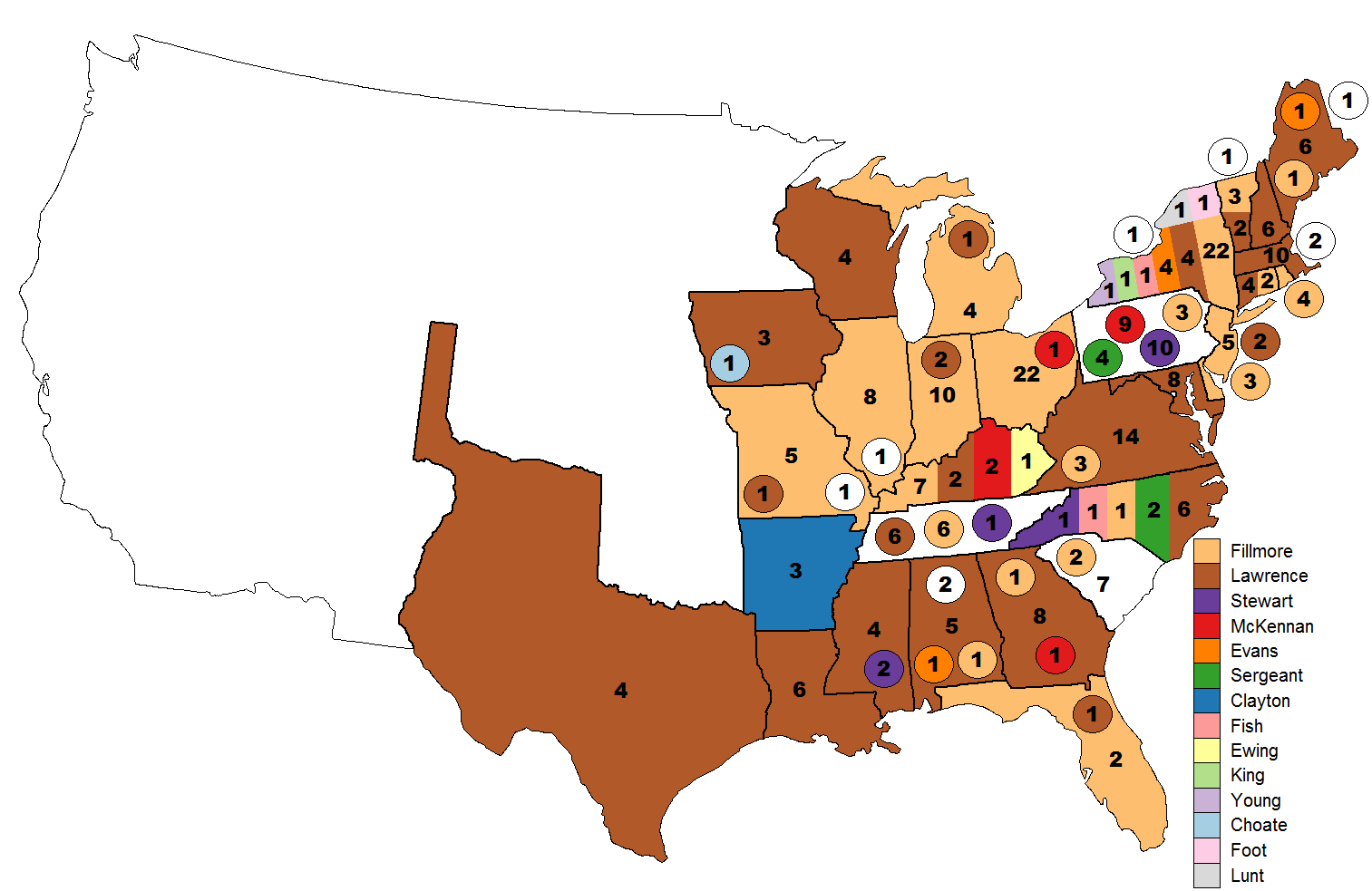
1st Vice Presidential Ballot

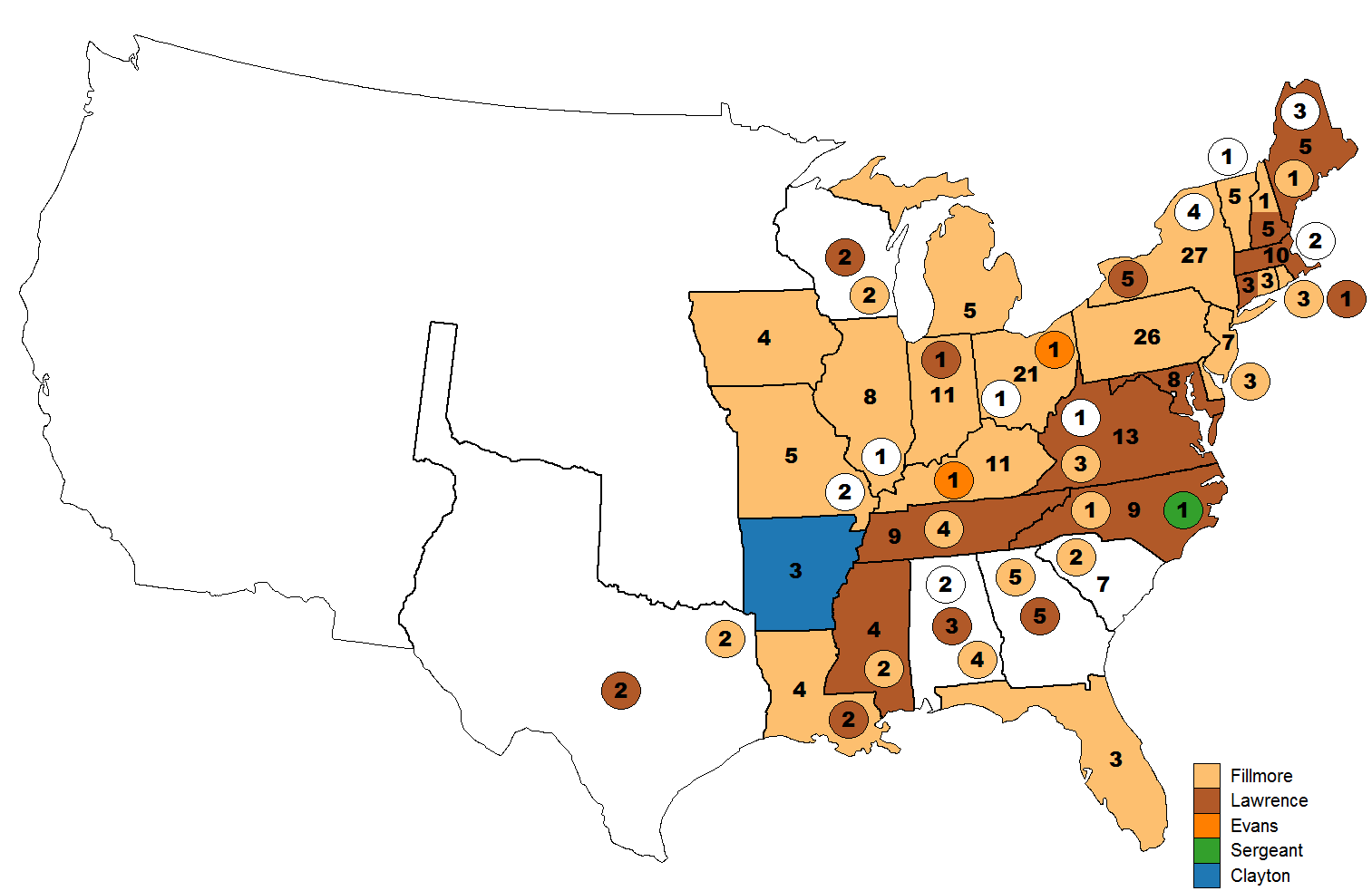
2nd Vice Presidential Ballot

== See also ==
- U.S. presidential nomination convention
- 1848 United States presidential election
- 1848 Democratic National Convention
