= Bates Cooke =

American politician

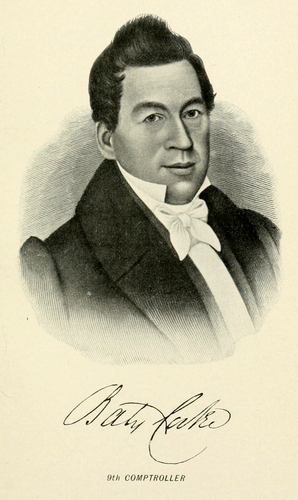

11th New York State Comptroller
- In office 1839–1841
- Governor: William H. Seward
- Preceded by: Azariah C. Flagg
- Succeeded by: John A. Collier

Member of the U.S. House of Representatives from New York's 30th district
- In office March 4, 1831 – March 3, 1833
- Preceded by: Ebenezer F. Norton
- Succeeded by: Philo C. Fuller

Personal details
- Born: December 23, 1787 Wallingford, Connecticut
- Died: May 31, 1841 (aged 53) Lewiston, New York
- Party: Anti-Masonic

Bates Cooke (December 23, 1787 – May 31, 1841) was an American lawyer and politician.

== Life ==
He was the son of Lemuel Cooke who had fought in the American Revolutionary War. Bates and his brother Lathrop participated in the War of 1812.

Bates Cooke was Supervisor of the Town of Cambria, New York in 1814. Then he studied law, was admitted to the bar about 1815 and commenced practice in Lewiston.

He was elected as an Anti-Mason to the 22nd United States Congress, and served from March 4, 1831 to March 3, 1833.

Bates and Lathrop Cooke were partners of the Lewiston Railroad Company, which connected with the Lockport and Niagara Falls Railroad in 1835.

He was New York State Comptroller from 1839 to January 1841 when he resigned because of his bad health. Subsequently, he was appointed a bank commissioner and died in office soon after.

He was buried at the Oak Wood Cemetery in Lewiston.

== Sources ==
- United States Congress. "Bates Cooke (id: C000729)". Biographical Directory of the United States Congress.
- Google Books The New York Civil List compiled by Franklin Benjamin Hough (pages 34 and 39; Weed, Parsons and Co., 1858) (giving the impression that Cooke was appointed bank commissioner in May 1840, but in fact he was appointed ["under the act of May 1840"] only after his resignation as Comptroller)
- Bates Cooke on Political Graveyard
- An episode from the Revolutionary War, in The New York Times on April 8, 1883 (PDF)
- Lewiston history

U.S. House of Representatives
Preceded by Ebenezer F. Norton	Member of the U.S. House of Representatives from New York's 30th congressional district 1831–1833	Succeeded by Philo C. Fuller
Political offices
Preceded by Azariah Cutting Flagg	New York State Comptroller; 1839–1841	Succeeded by John A. Collier
