= Press-Republican =

Daily newspaper in Plattsburgh, New York

- Type: Daily newspaper
- Format: Broadsheet
- Owner: Community Newspaper Holdings
- Publisher: John Celestino (interim)
- Editor: Melissa Erny
- Founded: April 11, 1812 (Plattsburgh Republican); August 16, 1894 (Plattsburgh Daily Press); October 6, 1942 (merged Press-Republican)
- Headquarters: 170 Margaret Street Plattsburgh, New York, 12901, US
- Circulation: 14,132 Daily (as of 2017)
- Website: pressrepublican.com

The Press-Republican is a daily newspaper published five days a week, Tuesday through Friday with a Saturday weekend edition in Plattsburgh, New York, United States. It is owned by Community Newspaper Holdings Inc., a subsidiary of the Retirement Systems of Alabama.

The Press-Republican covers Clinton, Essex and Franklin counties in Northeastern New York state.

Community Newspaper Holdings bought the Press-Republican in late 2006 from Ottaway Community Newspapers, a division of Dow Jones & Company.

== History ==
The Press-Republican traces its history to the Republican with its first issue printed on April 12, 1811. In October 1813, under Azariah C. Flagg it changed its name to the Plattsburgh Republican. It was a weekly publication until 1916, then the paper changed its name to the Plattsburgh Daily Republican and printed a daily edition; holidays and Sundays were the exception.

Two decades earlier, on August 16, 1894, the Plattsburgh Daily Press published it first issue For the next forty-eight years, the Plattsburgh Daily Press and the Plattsburgh Daily Republican were the major print news sources for residents of the North Country.

On October 5, 1942, the Plattsburgh Daily Republican published its last newspaper issue, as the Daily Press and the Daily Republican merged to form the Plattsburgh Press-Republican. On October 5, 1942, the Plattsburgh Daily Press reported about the merger that, "The Plattsburgh Daily Republican has been the Democratic paper of the county and the Plattsburgh Daily Press has been the Republican organ. The interests of both parties will be served in the new publication." The Press-Republican began printing on October 6, 1942, featuring a mixed headline with the St. Louis Cardinals winning the World Series and Nazis moving northwest of Stalingrad.

Joe LoTemplio was appointed editor on June 29, 2019.

John Celestino began serving as interim publisher on August 3, 2019.
