= John A. Collier =

American politician (1787–1873)

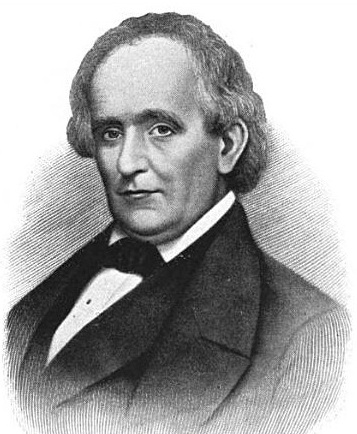
- Sketch of Collier in 1897 publication

12th New York State Comptroller
- In office January 27, 1841 – February 7, 1842
- Governor: William H. Seward
- Preceded by: Bates Cooke
- Succeeded by: Azariah C. Flagg

Member of the U.S. House of Representatives from New York's 21st district
- In office March 4, 1831 – March 3, 1833
- Preceded by: Robert Monell
- Succeeded by: Henry Mitchell

District attorney of Broome County
- In office 1818–1822

Personal details
- Born: November 13, 1787 Litchfield, Connecticut, U.S.
- Died: March 24, 1873 (aged 85) Binghamton, New York, U.S.
- Resting place: Spring Forest Cemetery; Binghamton, New York, U.S.
- Party: Anti-Masonic
- Spouses: Barbara Doty (m. 1810; died 1826) Lydia Shephard (m. 1829; died 1829): Elizabeth Morris
- Children: 6
- Relatives: Edwin Arthur Hall (great-grandson)
- Education: Yale College; Litchfield Law School
- Occupation: Politician; lawyer; developer

John Allen Collier (November 13, 1787 – March 24, 1873) was an American lawyer and politician from New York.

== Early life ==
John Allen Collier was born on November 13, 1787, in Litchfield, Connecticut. He attended Yale College in 1803, then studied law at Litchfield Law School. He was admitted to the bar at Troy, New York, in 1809.

== Career ==
After graduating, Collier started practicing law in Binghamton, New York. He was District Attorney of Broome County from June 11, 1818, to February 25, 1822. He partnered with Daniel Leroy in developing projects in Binghamton. They built bridges and roads, and developed parcels. Leroy would move west and leave Collier to continue the work himself.

Collier was elected as an Anti-Mason to the 22nd United States Congress, serving from March 4, 1831, to March 3, 1833. He was defeated for re-election in 1832.

He was New York State Comptroller from January 27, 1841, to February 7, 1842, elected by the New York State Legislature to fill the unexpired term of Bates Cooke. Then, he resumed the practice of law.

He was an unsuccessful candidate for election in 1844 to the U.S. Congress. He was appointed a commissioner to revise the state statutes in 1847. He was a presidential elector on the Whig ticket in 1848. He gave a speech at the 1848 Whig National Convention that suggested Millard Fillmore as the vice presidential candidate on Zachary Taylor's ticket. When Fillmore became president, Collier was reportedly selected by Fillmore for appointment as collector of taxes in San Francisco, but Fillmore's allies prevented the appointment from happening due to Collier's personal affairs. Collier's son James was appointed to that role, but only served for six months before he was removed from the role due to "fiscal malfeasance".

== Personal life ==
Collier married Barbara Doty in 1810. They had four children. His wife died in 1826. In 1829, Collier married Lydia Shephard. They had one child and she died during the birth in 1829. He then married Elizabeth Morris. They had one child. He had a reputation as a womanizer and was arrested for exposure at an Albany hotel. He was the great-grandfather of United States Representative Edwin Arthur Hall.

Collier built Ingleside in 1837. It was a Greek Revival house on Chenango Street in Binghamton. The house was demolished in 1967.

Collier died on March 24, 1873, at his home in Binghamton. He was buried at the Spring Forest Cemetery in Binghamton.

== Legacy ==
A street in Binghamton is named in his honor.

U.S. House of Representatives
Preceded by Robert Monell	Member of the U.S. House of Representatives from New York's 21st congressional district 1831–1833	Succeeded by Henry Mitchell
Political offices
Preceded by Bates Cooke	New York State Comptroller; 1841–1842	Succeeded by Azariah C. Flagg
