= Azariah C. Flagg =

American politician

Azariah Cutting Flagg
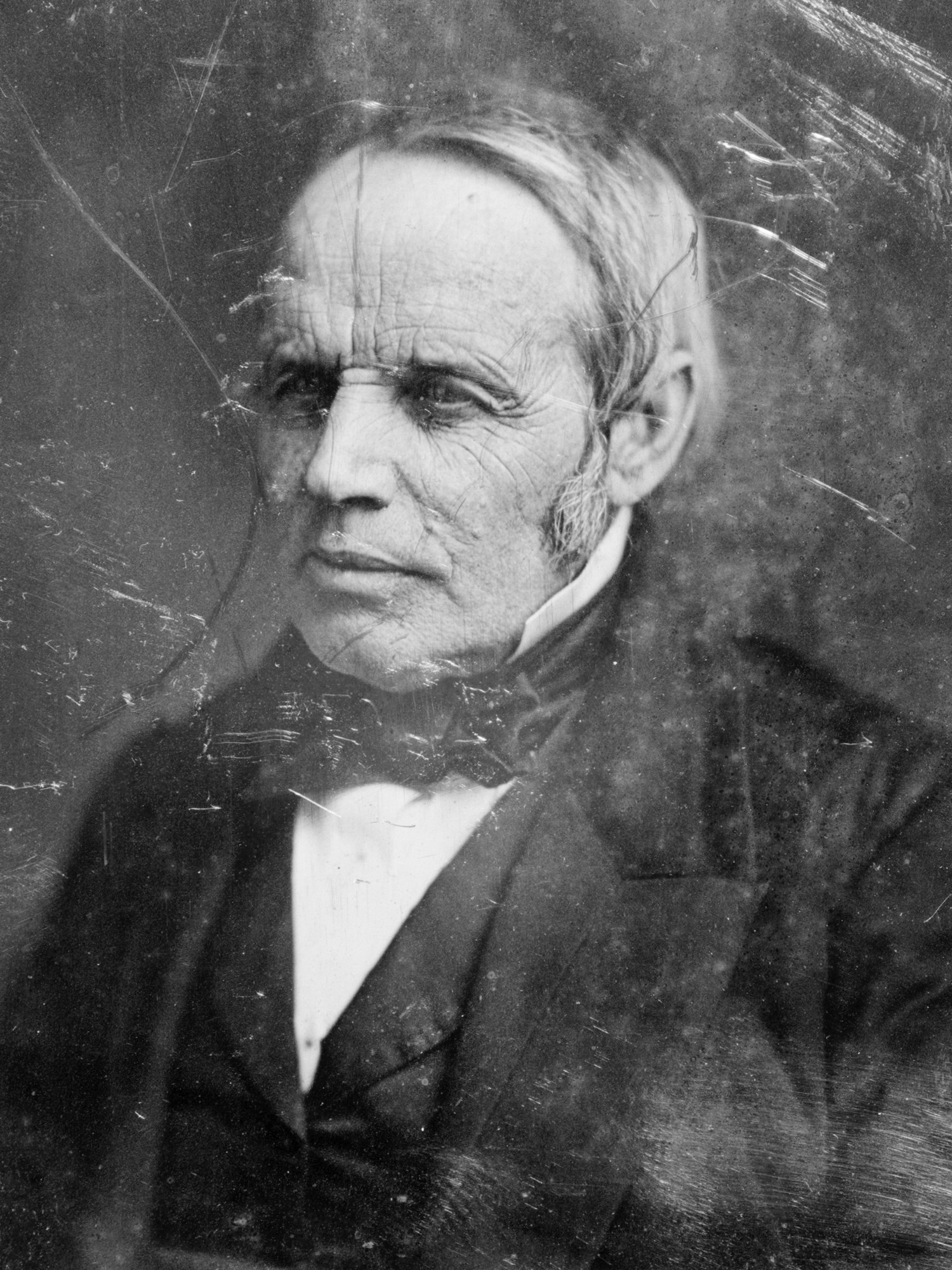
- Portrait by Brady c. 1844–1860

18th New York City Comptroller
- In office January 1, 1853 – December 31, 1858
- Mayor: Jacob Aaron Westervelt; Fernando Wood
- Preceded by: Joseph R. Taylor
- Succeeded by: Robert T. Haws

10th New York State Comptroller
- In office February 7, 1842 – December 31, 1847
- Governor: William H. Seward; Silas Wright; John Young
- Preceded by: John A. Collier
- Succeeded by: Millard Fillmore
- In office January 11, 1833 – February 4, 1839
- Governor: William L. Marcy; William H. Seward
- Preceded by: Silas Wright
- Succeeded by: Bates Cooke

11th Secretary of State of New York
- In office February 14, 1826 – January 12, 1833
- Governor: DeWitt Clinton; Nathaniel Pitcher; Martin Van Buren; Enos T. Throop; William L. Marcy
- Preceded by: John Van Ness Yates
- Succeeded by: John Adams Dix

Member of the New York State Assembly from the Clinton district
- In office January 1, 1823 – December 31, 1824
- Preceded by: Abijah North
- Succeeded by: Josiah Fisk

Personal details
- Born: November 28, 1790 Orwell, Vermont
- Died: November 24, 1873 (aged 82) New York City, New York
- Party: Republican; Free Soil; Democratic; Democratic-Republican
- Spouse: Phoebe Maria Cole
- Education: Union College

Military service
- Allegiance: United States
- Branch/service: United States Army
- Years of service: 1812–1814
- Battles/wars: War of 1812

Azariah Cutting Flagg (November 28, 1790 – November 24, 1873) was an American newspaper printer, editor and politician who served twice as New York State Comptroller from 1833 to 1839 and 1842 to 1847, in addition to several other posts. He was an ally of President Martin Van Buren, and became a leading member of the Albany Regency, one of the nation's earliest political machines.

== Early life ==
Azariah Flagg was the second son of Ebenezer Flagg (1756–1828) and Elizabeth Cutting Flagg (d. 1838). At age eleven, he took five-year apprenticeship in 1801–1806 with his uncle, who was a printer in Burlington, Vermont. After learning and starting practicing trade as journeyman printer, he decided to try his fortunes in Plattsburgh, New York, where he arrived in October 1811. He married Phoebe Maria Cole in October 1814; she gave birth to two daughters, Martha Maria, and Elizabeth, and a son, Henry Franklin. Flagg joined the Clinton County militia, and during the War of 1812 fought in the 36th Regiment of the New York Militia of the Major General Benjamin Mooers' militia division.

== War of 1812 ==
On September 5, 1814, Flagg became a militia lieutenant in a small scouting detachment of teenage boys from the Plattsburgh Academy raised by captain Martin James Aikin (1791-1828). Underage soldiers were called the Aiken’s volunteers since they were too young to enlist, and captain's name as their sponsor was recorded instead in a muster roll.

General Alexander Macomb praised the Aiken's Volunteer Rifle Company for not falling back in disorder with the bulk of Mooers' militia during the first encounters with the British invading force in the Battle of Plattsburgh. Following retreat, Aiken's volunteers manned the bank of the Saranac River to prevent the enemy from crossing it; one boy was killed in the resulting skirmish. After the British started their withdrawal from Plattsburgh, the Aiken's volunteers were disbanded. In 1826, Congress awarded each of them, including Flagg, "one rifle, promised them by General Macomb, while commanding the Champlain Department, for their gallantry and patriotic services as a volunteer corps during the siege of Plattsburgh. On each of which said rifles there shall be a plate containing an appropriate inscription."

== Career ==
In 1811–1813, Flagg published The Republican in Plattsburgh while Colonel Melancton Smith, Jr. (1782-1818) provided the editorship. From Spring 1813 to 1826, he was the sole publisher and editor of the renamed Plattsburgh Republican. His war record and Republican's readership made him popular in the county, and Flagg was elected from Clinton County to the New York State Assembly in 1823 and 1824.

He was elected Secretary of State of New York in 1826, and re-elected in 1829. By the virtue of his office, he also served as Superintendent of Common Schools and Commissioner of the Canal Fund and the Canal Board. Despite his limited schooling, Flagg was able to fulfill his duties as he was self-educating himself through life.

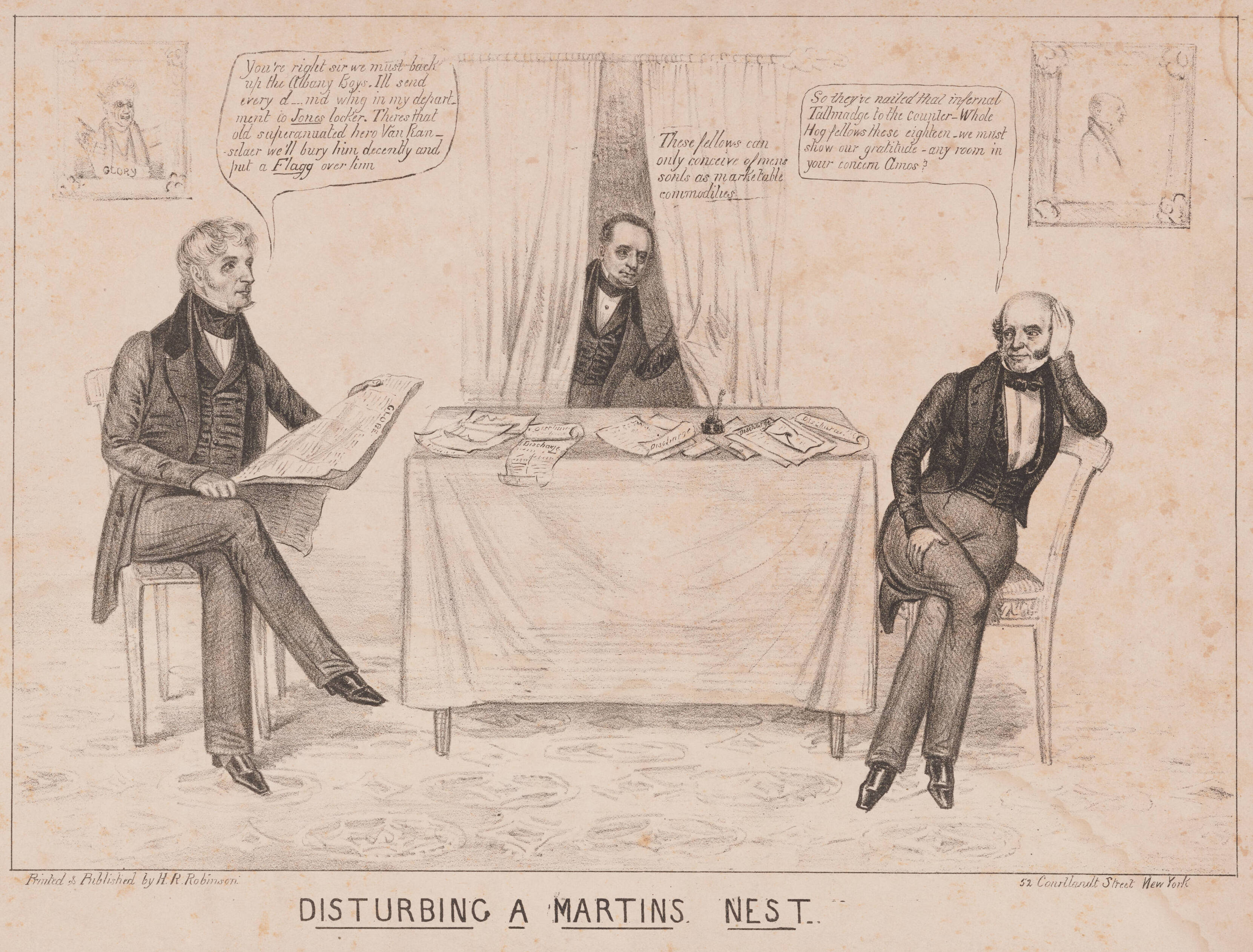
"Disturbing a Martin's nest," political cartoon by Henry R. Robinson, 1838. Flagg is in the center, behind the curtains.

He was elected New York State Comptroller in 1833, a post he held in 1833–1839, and from 1842 to 1847, both times for two terms. In 1839, President Martin Van Buren appointed Flagg as Postmaster at Albany; he kept the job until 1841. Van Buren recommended him in 1844 to newly-elected President James K. Polk as a candidate for secretary of the treasury office, but to no avail. After finally losing the state comptroller's position, Flagg became president of the Hudson River Railroad Company, was a treasurer of the Chicago and Rock Island Railroad and served on several railroad boards. Flagg's final political office was New York City Comptroller, in which capacity he served in 1852–1858. He retired in November 1858 after developing blindness.

During his long political career, he began as a member of the Bucktails faction of the Democratic-Republican Party, then became a Jacksonian, a Democrat and Barnburner, then joined the Free Soilers in the late 1840s, and finally the nascent Republican Party in the mid-1850s. He was one of the leading members of the Albany Regency, who exercised a great deal of control over New York's Democratic-Republican Party, along with Van Buren, Silas Wright, and William L. Marcy. In a curious encounter, Flagg was introduced to Alexis de Tocqueville in Albany in 1831, and invited him to walk during the 4th of July parade with the state dignitaries. Tocqueville left a mixed review of the event.

Flagg suffered blindness in his both eyes during his last fourteen years of life, but managed to keep track of the public affairs with the help of his family. He continued to publish in newspapers on political and economical issues, including finances and transportation. He died in his home in New York City and was buried at the Green-Wood Cemetery, Brooklyn.

Political offices
Preceded by John Van Ness Yates	Secretary of State of New York; 1826–1833	Succeeded by John Adams Dix
Preceded by Silas Wright	New York State Comptroller; 1833–1839	Succeeded by Bates Cooke
Preceded by John A. Collier	New York State Comptroller; 1842–1847	Succeeded by Millard Fillmore
