= List of United States representatives in the 17th Congress =

This is a complete list of United States representatives during the 17th United States Congress listed by seniority. For the most part, representatives are ranked by the beginning of their terms in office.

As an historical article, the districts and party affiliations listed reflect those during the 17th Congress (March 4, 1821 – March 3, 1823). Seats and party affiliations on similar lists for other congresses will be different for certain members.

This article describes the criteria for seniority in the House of Representatives and sets out the list of members by seniority. It is prepared on the basis of the interpretation of seniority applied to the House of Representatives in the current congress. In the absence of information to the contrary, it is presumed that the twenty-first-century practice is identical to the seniority customs used during the 17th Congress.

== House seniority ==
Seniority in the House, for representatives with unbroken service, depends on the date on which the members first term began. That date is either the start of the Congress (4 March in odd numbered years, for the era up to and including the 73rd Congress starting in 1933) or the date of a special election during the Congress. Since many members start serving on the same day as others, ranking between them is based on alphabetical order by the last name of the representative.

Representatives in early congresses were often elected after the legal start of the Congress. Such representatives are attributed with unbroken seniority, from the legal start of the congressional term, if they were the first person elected to a seat in a Congress. The date of the election is indicated in a note.

The seniority date is normally taken from the members entry in the Biographical Directory of the United States Congress, except where the date given is the legal start of the Congress and the actual election (for someone who was not the first person elected to the seat in that Congress) was later. The date of election is taken from United States Congressional Elections 1788-1997. In a few instances the latter work provides dates, for the start and end of terms, which correct those in the Biographical Directory.

The Biographical Directory normally uses the date of a special election, as the seniority date. However, mostly in early congresses, the date of the member taking his seat can be the one given. The date of the special election is mentioned in a note to the list below, when that date is not used as the seniority date by the Biographical Directory.

Representatives who returned to the House, after having previously served, are credited with service equal to one less than the total number of terms they served. When a representative has served a prior term of less than two terms (i.e. prior term minus one equals less than one), he is ranked above all others whose service begins on the same day.

== Leadership ==
In this Congress the only formal leader was the speaker of the House. A speakership election was held on December 3–4, 1821 and Philip P. Barbour (DR-VA) was elected on the tenth ballot. In the final ballot, Barbour received 88 votes, John W. Taylor (DR-NY) (speaker at the end of the previous Congress) had 67 votes, Henry Baldwin (DR-PA) 6, Samuel Smith (DR-MD) 4, Caesar A. Rodney (DR-DE) 3 and there were 4 scattering votes.

The title Dean of the House (sometimes known, in the nineteenth century, as Father of the House) was held by the member with the longest continuous service. It was not a formal leadership position.

== Standing committees ==
The House created its first standing committee, on April 13, 1789. There were twenty-one standing committees, listed in the rules initially used by the 17th Congress. Four additional committees were added during the Congress. The Committees on Indian Affairs was created on December 17, 1821. Standing committees on Foreign Affairs, Military Affairs and Naval Affairs were authorised, when the rules of the House were amended on March 14, 1822.

Committees, in this period, were normally appointed for a session at a time by the speaker. However the resolution of March 30, 1816, which created the committees on departmental expenditures and Expenditures on Public Buildings, provided for those standing committees to be appointed for the whole Congress.

This list refers to the standing committees of the House in the 17th Congress, the year of establishment as a standing committee, the number of members assigned to the committee and the dates of appointment in each session (or if appropriate for the Congress), the end of the session (if appropriate) and its chairman. Chairmen, who were re-appointed after serving in the previous Congress, are indicated by an *.

The first session was December 3, 1821 – May 8, 1822 (157 days) and the second session was December 2, 1822 – March 3, 1823 (92 days).

No.	Committee	From	Members	Term	Chairman
1	Accounts	1805	3	December 5, 1821 – May 8, 1822	Samuel C. Allen (F-MA)
1	Accounts	1805	3	December 3, 1822 – March 3, 1823	Samuel C. Allen (F-MA)
2	Agriculture	1820	7	December 5, 1821 – May 8, 1822	Josiah Butler (DR-NH)
2	Agriculture	1820	7	December 3, 1822 – March 3, 1823	Josiah Butler (DR-NH)
3	Claims	1794	7	December 5, 1821 – May 8, 1822	*Lewis Williams (DR-NC)
3	Claims	1794	7	December 3, 1822 – March 3, 1823	*Lewis Williams (DR-NC)
4	Commerce	1795	7	December 5, 1821 – May 8, 1822	*Thomas Newton, Jr. (DR-VA)
4	Commerce	1795	7	December 3, 1822 – March 3, 1823	*Thomas Newton, Jr. (DR-VA)
5	District of Columbia	1808	7	December 5, 1821 – May 8, 1822	*Joseph Kent (DR-MD)
5	District of Columbia	1808	7	December 3, 1822 – March 3, 1823	*Joseph Kent (DR-MD)
6	Elections	1789	7	December 5, 1821 – May 8, 1822	John Sloane (DR-OH)
6	Elections	1789	7	December 3, 1822 – March 3, 1823	John Sloane (DR-OH)
7	Expenditures in the Navy Department	1816	3	December 5, 1821-March 3, 1823	Samuel Edwards (F-PA)
8	Expenditures in the Post Office Department	1816	3	December 5, 1821-March 3, 1823	George Denison (DR-PA)
9	Expenditures in the State Department	1816	3	December 5, 1821-March 3, 1823	Silas Wood (F-NY)
10	Expenditures in the Treasury Department	1816	3	December 5, 1821-March 3, 1823	Albert H. Tracy (DR-NY)
11	Expenditures in the War Department	1816	3	December 5, 1821-March 3, 1823	George Tucker (DR-VA)
12	Expenditures on Public Buildings	1816	3	December 5, 1821-March 3, 1823	Jeremiah Nelson (F-MA)
13	Foreign Affairs	1822	7	December 3, 1822-March 3, 1823	Jonathan Russell (DR-MA)
14	Indian Affairs	1821	7	December 7, 1821 – May 8, 1822	Samuel Moore (DR-PA)
14	Indian Affairs	1821	7	December 3, 1822 – March 3, 1823	Thomas Metcalfe (DR-KY)
15	Judiciary	1813	7	December 5, 1821 – May 8, 1822	*John Sergeant (F-PA)
15	Judiciary	1813	7	December 3, 1822 – March 3, 1823	Hugh Nelson (DR-VA) (a)
16	Manufactures	1819	7	December 5, 1821 – May 8, 1822	*Henry Baldwin (DR-PA)
16	Manufactures	1819	7	December 3, 1822 – March 3, 1823	John Tod (DR-PA)
17	Military Affairs	1822	7	December 3, 1822-March 3, 1823	William Eustis (DR-MA)
18	Naval Affairs	1822	7	December 3, 1822-March 3, 1823	Timothy Fuller (DR-MA)
19	Pensions and Revolutionary Claims	1813	7	December 5, 1821 – May 8, 1822	*John Rhea (DR-TN)
19	Pensions and Revolutionary Claims	1813	7	December 3, 1822 – March 3, 1823	*John Rhea (DR-TN)
20	Post Office and Post Roads	1808	7	December 5, 1821 – May 8, 1822	Francis Johnson (DR-KY)
20	Post Office and Post Roads	1808	7	December 3, 1822 – March 3, 1823	Francis Johnson (DR-KY)
21	Private Land Claims	1816	7	December 5, 1821 – May 8, 1822	*John W. Campbell (DR-OH)
21	Private Land Claims	1816	7	December 3, 1822 – March 3, 1823	*John W. Campbell (DR-OH)
22	Public Expenditures	1814	7	December 5, 1821 – May 8, 1822	Thomas Montgomery (DR-KY)
22	Public Expenditures	1814	7	December 3, 1822 – March 3, 1823	Thomas Montgomery (DR-KY)
23	Public Lands	1805	7	December 5, 1821 – May 8, 1822	Christopher Rankin (DR-MS)
23	Public Lands	1805	7	December 3, 1822 – March 3, 1823	Christopher Rankin (DR-MS)
24	Revisal and Unfinished Business	1795	3	December 5, 1821 – May 8, 1822	Samuel Lathrop (F-MA)
24	Revisal and Unfinished Business	1795	3	December 3, 1822 – March 3, 1823	Thomas R. Ross (DR-OH)
25	Ways and Means	1802	7	December 5, 1821 – May 8, 1822	*Samuel Smith (DR-MD) (b)
25	Ways and Means	1802	7	December 3, 1822 – March 3, 1823	*Samuel Smith (DR-MD) (b)

Notes:-

- (a) Resigned from the House on January 14, 1823. William Plumer, Jr. (DR-NH) became Chairman for the rest of the Congress.
- (a) Resigned from the House on December 17, 1822. Louis McLane (DR-DE) was the ranking member of the committee named for the session. He became Chairman for the rest of the Congress, although this is not recorded in the Biographical Directory of the United States Congress.

== List of representatives by seniority ==
A numerical rank is assigned to each of the 186 members initially elected to the 17th Congress. Other members, who were not the first person elected to a seat but who joined the House during the Congress, are not assigned a number (except for the representative from the newly admitted state of Missouri, who is assigned the number 187). The recently admitted state of Maine was assigned six additional seats in this Congress, to add to the one transferred in the last Congress, which had previously been allocated to Massachusetts.

Eleven representatives-elect were not sworn in. 1 declined to serve (SC-8), 1 did not qualify (TN-6), 3 died (KY-8, NJ-al:Linn, NY-6), 4 resigned (KY-7, OH-4, PA-5:Duncan, PA-10:Ellis) and 2 were unseated (not having taken their seats) after election contests (MD-6, NY-1:Sharp). The list below includes the representatives-elect (with name in italics), with the seniority they would have held if sworn in.

The notes indicate, with [H], a member (the territorial delegate from Florida) with a Hispanic backgrounds.

Party designations used in this article are DR for Democratic-Republican members and F for Federalist representatives. Designations used for service in the first three congresses are (A) for Anti-Administration members and (P) for Pro-Administration representatives.

U.S. House seniority
Rank	Representative	Party	District	Seniority date	Notes
Eleven consecutive terms
1	Thomas Newton, Jr.	DR	VA-21	March 4, 1801	Elected to this Congress: April 1–30, 1821. Dean of the House. Chairman: Commerce.
Ten non-consecutive terms
2	John Randolph	DR	VA-16	March 4, 1819	Previously served (DR) 1799-1813 and 1815-17 while in the House. Elected to this Congress: April 1–30, 1821.
Nine non-consecutive terms
3	Anthony New	DR	KY-5	March 4, 1821	Previously served (A-VA) 1793–95, (DR-VA) 1795–1805, (DR-KY) 1811-13 and 1817-19 while in the House. Last term while serving in the House.
4	John Rhea	DR	TN-1	March 4, 1817	Previously served (DR) 1803–15. Elected to this Congress: August 9–10, 1821. Chairman: Pensions and Revolutionary Claims. Last term while serving in the House.
5	Samuel Smith	DR	MD-5	January 31, 1816	Previously served (A) 1793-95 and (DR) 1795-1803 while in the House. Chairman: Ways and Means (1821–22). Resigned, to become United States Senator from Maryland: December 17, 1822. Elected to 18th Congress but did not take seat.
Seven non-consecutive terms
6	Burwell Bassett	DR	VA-13	March 4, 1821	Previously served (DR) 1805-13 and 1815–19. Elected to this Congress: April 1–30, 1821
Six consecutive terms
7	William Lowndes	DR	SC-2	March 4, 1811	Resigned while still serving in the House: May 8, 1822
8	William McCoy	DR	VA-4	March 4, 1811	Elected to this Congress: April 1–30, 1821
9	Hugh Nelson	DR	VA-22	March 4, 1811	Elected to this Congress: April 1–30, 1821. Chairman: Judiciary (1822–23). Resigned while still serving in the House: January 14, 1823.
Six non-consecutive terms
10	Lemuel Sawyer	DR	NC-1	March 4, 1817	Previously served (DR) 1807–13. Elected to this Congress: August 9, 1821. Last term while serving in the House until 19th Congress.
Five consecutive terms
11	John W. Taylor	DR	NY-11	March 4, 1813	Elected to this Congress: April 24–26, 1821
12	Philip P. Barbour	DR	VA-11	September 19, 1814	Elected to this Congress: April 1–30, 1821. Speaker of the House.
Five non-consecutive terms
13	Jeremiah Nelson	F	MA-3	March 4, 1815	Previously served (F) 1805–07. Chairman: Expenditures on Public Buildings.
14	Peter Little	DR	MD-5	September 2, 1816	Previously served (DR) 1811-13 while in the House.
15	Robert Wright	DR	MD-7	March 4, 1821	Previously served (DR) November 29, 1810-17 while in the House. Last term while serving in the House.
Four consecutive terms
16	Ephraim Bateman	DR	NJ-al	March 4, 1815	Last term while serving in the House of Representatives.
17	Lewis Williams	DR	NC-13	March 4, 1815	Elected to this Congress: August 9, 1821. Chairman: Claims.
18	John Sergeant	F	PA-1	October 10, 1815	Chairman: Judiciary (1821–22). Last term while serving in the House until 20th Congress.
19	Weldon N. Edwards	DR	NC-6	February 7, 1816	Elected to this Congress: August 9, 1821
20	William Hendricks	DR	IN-al	December 11, 1816	Resigned, to become Governor: July 25, 1822
Four non-consecutive terms
21	Joseph Kent	DR	MD-2	March 4, 1819	Previously served (DR) 1811-15 while in the House. Chairman: District of Columbia.
22	William Milnor	F	PA-1	March 4, 1821	Previously served (F) 1807-11 and 1815-17 while in the House. Resigned: May 8, 1822.
23	Charles Rich	DR	VT-3	March 4, 1817	Previously served (DR) 1813-15 while in the House.
24	Ezekiel Whitman	F	ME-2	March 4, 1817	Previously served (F-MA) 1809-11 and 1817–21. Resigned on June 1, 1822 while still serving in the House.
25	William Eustis	DR	MA-13	August 21, 1820	Previously served (DR) 1801-05 while in the House. Chairman: Military Affairs (1822–23). Last term while serving in the House. Elected to 18th Congress but did not take seat.
26	Newton Cannon	DR	TN-5	March 4, 1819	Previously served (DR) September 16, 1814–17. Elected to this Congress: August 9–10, 1821. Last term while serving in the House.
Three consecutive terms
27	Joel Abbot	DR	GA-al	March 4, 1817	
28	Samuel C. Allen	F	MA-6	March 4, 1817	Chairman: Accounts
29	Henry Baldwin	DR	PA-14	March 4, 1817	Chairman: Manufactures (1821–22). Resigned: May 8, 1822.
30	William L. Ball	DR	VA-9	March 4, 1817	Elected to this Congress: April 1–30, 1821
31	Thomas Bayly	F	MD-8	March 4, 1817	Last term while serving in the House.
32	Josiah Butler	DR	NH-al	March 4, 1817	Agriculture. Last term while serving in the House of Representatives.
33	John W. Campbell	DR	OH-2	March 4, 1817	Chairman: Private Land Claims
34	Samuel C. Crafts	DR	VT-5	March 4, 1817	
35	John Floyd	DR	VA-5	March 4, 1817	Elected to this Congress: April 1–30, 1821
36	Timothy Fuller	DR	MA-4	March 4, 1817	Chairman: Naval Affairs (1822–23)
37	Robert S. Garnett	DR	VA-12	March 4, 1817	Elected to this Congress: April 1–30, 1821
38	Thomas H. Hall	DR	NC-3	March 4, 1817	Elected to this Congress: August 9, 1821
39	Francis Jones	DR	TN-3	March 4, 1817	Elected to this Congress: August 9–10, 1821. Last term while serving in the House of Representatives.
40	John Linn	DR	NJ-al	March 4, 1817	Died, as Representative-elect: January 5, 1821
41	Louis McLane	F	DE-al	March 4, 1817	Ways and Means (1822–23)
42	Charles F. Mercer	F	VA-8	March 4, 1817	Elected to this Congress: April 1–30, 1821
43	Thomas Patterson	DR	PA-12	March 4, 1817	
44	George Robertson	DR	KY-7	March 4, 1817	Resigned, as Representative-elect, in 1821
45	Alexander Smyth	DR	VA-6	March 4, 1817	Elected to this Congress: April 1–30, 1821
46	David Trimble	DR	KY-1	March 4, 1817	
47	Starling Tucker	DR	SC-5	March 4, 1817	
48	Nathaniel Upham	DR	NH-al	March 4, 1817	Last term while serving in the House.
49	Felix Walker	DR	NC-12	March 4, 1817	Elected to this Congress: August 9, 1821. Last term while serving in the House.
50	Thomas J. Rogers	DR	PA-6	March 3, 1818	
51	Samuel Moore	DR	PA-6	October 13, 1818	Chairman: Indian Affairs (1821–22). Resigned while still serving in the House.: May 20, 1822.
52	Enoch Lincoln	DR	ME-7	November 4, 1818	Previously served (DR-MA) November 4, 1818-21 while in the House.
53	Robert R. Reid	DR	GA-al	February 18, 1819	Last term while still serving in the House.
Three non-consecutive terms
54	William Darlington	DR	PA-2	March 4, 1819	Previously served (DR) 1815-17 while in the House. Last term while serving in the House.
55	Benjamin Hardin	DR	KY-10	March 4, 1819	Previously served (DR) 1815-17 while in the House. Last term while serving in the House until 23rd Congress.
56	Joseph Hemphill	F	PA-1	March 4, 1819	Previously served (F) 1801-03 while in the House.
57	John Reed, Jr.	F	MA-9	March 4, 1821	Previously served (F) 1813-17 while in the House.
58	Thomas Montgomery	DR	KY-9	August 1, 1820	Previously served (DR) 1813-15 while in the House. Chairman: Public Expenditures. Last term while in the House.
59	Charles Hooks	DR	NC-5	March 4, 1819	Previously served (DR) December 2, 1816-17 while in the House. Elected to this Congress: August 9, 1821.
60	Alfred Cuthbert	DR	GA-al	March 4, 1821	Previously served (DR) December 13, 1813 – November 9, 1816 while in the House.
Two consecutive terms
61	Mark Alexander	DR	VA-18	March 4, 1819	Elected to this Congress: April 1–30, 1821
62	Robert Allen	DR	TN-4	March 4, 1819	Elected to this Congress: August 9–10, 1821
63	Henry H. Bryan	DR	TN-6	March 4, 1819	Elected to this Congress: August 9–10, 1821. Representative-elect, who did not qualify.
64	Hutchins G. Burton	DR	NC-2	March 4, 1819	Elected to this Congress: August 9, 1821
65	John Cocke	DR	TN-2	March 4, 1819	Elected to this Congress: August 9–10, 1821
66	Daniel P. Cook	DR	IL-al	March 4, 1819	
67	Joshua Cushman	DR	ME-6	March 4, 1819	Previously served (DR-MA) 1819-21 while in the House.
68	George Denison	DR	PA-10	March 4, 1819	Chairman: Expenditures in the Post Office Department. Last term while serving in the House.
69	John D. Dickinson	F	NY-10	March 4, 1819	Elected to this Congress: April 24–26, 1821. Last term while serving in the House until 20th Congress.
70	Samuel Eddy	DR	RI-al	March 4, 1819	
71	Henry W. Edwards	DR	CT-al	March 4, 1819	Elected to this Congress: April 2, 1821. Last term while serving in the House.
72	Samuel Edwards	F	PA-1	March 4, 1819	Chairman: Expenditures in the Navy Department
73	Samuel Gross	DR	PA-2	March 4, 1819	Last term while serving in the House.
74	Mark L. Hill	DR	ME-3	March 4, 1819	Previously served (DR-MA) 1819-21 while in the House. Last term while serving in the House.
75	James Jones	DR	VA-19	March 4, 1819	Elected to this Congress: April 1–30, 1821. Last term while serving in the House.
76	Samuel Lathrop	F	MA-5	March 4, 1819	Chairman: Revisal and Unfinished Business (1821–22)
77	Thomas Metcalfe	DR	KY-4	March 4, 1819	Chairman: Indian Affairs (1822–23)
78	Raphael Neale	F	MD-1	March 4, 1819	
79	James Overstreet	DR	SC-4	March 4, 1819	Died while still serving in the House: May 24, 1822
80	Nathaniel Pitcher	DR	NY-12	March 4, 1819	Elected to this Congress: April 24–26, 1821. Last term while serving in the House until 22nd Congress.
81	William Plumer, Jr.	DR	NH-al	March 4, 1819	Chairman: Judiciary (1823)
82	Christopher Rankin	DR	MS-al	March 4, 1819	Chairman: Public Lands
83	Thomas R. Ross	DR	OH-6	March 4, 1819	Chairman: Revisal and Unfinished Business (1822–23)
84	John Russ	DR	CT-al	March 4, 1819	Elected to this Congress: April 2, 1821. Last term while serving in the House.
85	John Sloane	DR	OH-1	March 4, 1819	Chairman: Elections
86	Gideon Tomlinson	DR	CT-al	March 4, 1819	Elected to this Congress: April 2, 1821
87	Albert H. Tracy	DR	NY-22	March 4, 1819	Elected to this Congress: April 24–26, 1821. Chairman: Expenditures in the Treasury Department.
88	George Tucker	DR	VA-15	March 4, 1819	Elected to this Congress: April 1–30, 1821. Chairman: Expenditures in the War Department.
89	Solomon Van Rensselaer	F	NY-9	March 4, 1819	Elected to this Congress: April 24–26, 1821. Resigned while still serving in the House: January 14, 1822.
90	Thomas Van Swearingen	F	VA-2	March 4, 1819	Elected to this Congress: April 1–30, 1821. Died while still serving in the House: August 19, 1822.
91	Henry R. Warfield	F	MD-3	March 4, 1819	
92	Jared Williams	DR	VA-3	March 4, 1819	Elected to this Congress: April 1–30, 1821
93	Silas Wood	F	NY-1	March 4, 1819	Elected to this Congress: April 24–26, 1821. Chairman: Expenditures in the State Department.
94	William S. Archer	DR	VA-17	January 3, 1820	Elected to this Congress: April 1–30, 1821
95	Rollin C. Mallary	DR	VT-1	January 13, 1820	
96	Edward B. Jackson	DR	VA-1	October 23, 1820	Elected to this Congress: April 1–30, 1821. Last term while serving in the House.
97	Joseph Dane	F	ME-1	November 6, 1820	Last term while serving in the House.
98	Benjamin Gorham	DR	MA-1	November 6, 1820	Last term while serving in the House until 20th Congress.
99	Francis Johnson	DR	KY-6	November 13, 1820	Chairman: Post Office and Post Roads
100	Thomas L. Moore	DR	VA-10	November 13, 1820	Elected to this Congress: April 1–30, 1821. Last term while serving in the House.
101	Aaron Hobart	DR	MA-8	November 24, 1820	
102	William S. Blackledge	DR	NC-4	February 7, 1821	Elected to this Congress: August 9, 1821. Last term while serving in the House.
Two non-consecutive terms
103	Levi Barber	DR	OH-3	March 4, 1821	Previously served (DR) 1817-19 while in the House. Last term while serving in the House.
104	Caesar A. Rodney	DR	DE-al	March 4, 1821	Previously served (DR) 1803–05. Resigned, to become US Senator: January 24, 1822.
One term
105	Noyes Barber	DR	CT-al	March 4, 1821	Elected to this Congress: April 2, 1821
106	Gideon Barstow	DR	MA-2	March 4, 1821	Elected to this Congress: April 16, 1821. Only term while serving in the House.
107	Francis Baylies	F	MA-10	March 4, 1821	
108	Lewis Bigelow	F	MA-12	March 4, 1821	Only term while serving in the House.
...	James Blair	DR	SC-9	March 4, 1821	Special election, before start of Congress: February 5–6, 1821. Resigned: May 8, 1822. Only term while serving in the House until 21st Congress.
109	John Brown	DR	PA-9	March 4, 1821	
110	James Buchanan	F	PA-3	March 4, 1821	
111	Wingfield Bullock	DR	KY-8	March 4, 1821	Died, as Representative-elect: October 13, 1821
112	Daniel Burrows	DR	CT-al	March 4, 1821	Elected to this Congress: April 2, 1821. Only term while serving in the House.
113	George Cassedy	DR	NJ-al	March 4, 1821	
114	Henry W. Connor	DR	NC-11	March 4, 1821	Elected to this Congress: August 9, 1821
115	Jeremiah Cosden	DR	MD-6	March 4, 1821	Unseated, as Representative-elect, after an election contest: March 19, 1822
116	Josiah Crudup	DR	NC-8	March 4, 1821	Elected to this Congress: August 9, 1821. Only term while serving in the House.
117	James Duncan	F	PA-5	March 4, 1821	Resigned, as Representative-elect: April 1821
118	Job Durfee	DR	RI-al	March 4, 1821	
119	Henry W. Dwight	F	MA-7	March 4, 1821	
120	William C. Ellis	F	PA-10	March 4, 1821	Resigned, as Representative-elect: July 20, 1821. Only term until 18th Congress.
121	Patrick Farrelly	DR	PA-15	March 4, 1821	
122	George R. Gilmer	DR	GA-al	March 4, 1821	Only term while serving in the House until 20th Congress.
123	Joseph Gist	DR	SC-8	March 4, 1821	
124	Matthew Harvey	DR	NH-al	March 4, 1821	
125	Ebenezer Herrick	DR	ME-5	March 4, 1821	Elected to this Congress: May 7, 1821
126	George Holcombe	DR	NJ-al	March 4, 1821	
127	John T. Johnson	DR	KY-3	March 4, 1821	
128	Josiah S. Johnston	DR	LA-al	March 4, 1821	Only term while serving in the House.
129	Elias Keyes	DR	VT-4	March 4, 1821	Only term while serving in the House.
130	Jabez Leftwich	DR	VA-14	March 4, 1821	Elected to this Congress: April 1–30, 1821
131	John Long	DR	NC-10	March 4, 1821	Elected to this Congress: August 9, 1821
132	James Matlack	DR	NJ-al	March 4, 1821	
133	Aaron Matson	DR	NH-al	March 4, 1821	
134	John Mattocks	DR	VT-6	March 4, 1821	Only term while serving in the House until 19th Congress.
135	George McDuffie	DR	SC-6	March 4, 1821	
136	Archibald McNeill	F	NC-7	March 4, 1821	Elected to this Congress: August 9, 1821. Only term while serving in the House until 19th Congress.
137	James McSherry	F	PA-5	March 4, 1821	Only term while serving in the House.
138	James S. Mitchell	DR	PA-4	March 4, 1821	
139	Thomas R. Mitchell	DR	SC-3	March 4, 1821	Only term while serving in the House until 19th Congress.
140	Gabriel Moore	DR	AL-al	March 4, 1821	Elected to this Congress: August 5–6, 1821
141	John Nelson	DR	MD-4	March 4, 1821	Only term while serving in the House.
142	John Phillips	F	PA-3	March 4, 1821	Only term while serving in the House.
143	George Plumer	DR	PA-11	March 4, 1821	
144	Joel R. Poinsett	DR	SC-1	March 4, 1821	
145	Joseph Richardson	DR	SC-8	March 4, 1821	Declined to serve, as Representative-elect, before start of Congress
146	Jonathan Russell	DR	MA-11	March 4, 1821	Chairman: Foreign Affairs (1822–23). Only term while serving in the House.
147	Romulus M. Saunders	DR	NC-9	March 4, 1821	Elected to this Congress: August 9, 1821
148	Arthur Smith	DR	VA-20	March 4, 1821	Elected to this Congress: April 1–30, 1821
149	William Smith	DR	VA-7	March 4, 1821	Elected to this Congress: April 1–30, 1821
150	Ansel Sterling	DR	CT-al	March 4, 1821	Elected to this Congress: April 2, 1821
151	Andrew Stevenson	DR	VA-23	March 4, 1821	Elected to this Congress: April 1–30, 1821
152	Andrew Stewart	DR	PA-13	March 4, 1821	
153	Ebenezer Stoddard	DR	CT-al	March 4, 1821	Elected to this Congress: April 2, 1821
154	Samuel Swan	DR	NJ-al	March 4, 1821	
155	Edward F. Tattnall	DR	GA-al	March 4, 1821	
156	Wiley Thompson	DR	GA-al	March 4, 1821	
157	John Tod	DR	PA-8	March 4, 1821	Chairman: Manufactures (1822–23)
158	Joseph Vance	DR	OH-5	March 4, 1821	
159	Thomas Whipple, Jr.	DR	NH-al	March 4, 1821	
160	Phineas White	DR	VT-2	March 4, 1821	Elected to this Congress: October 22, 1821. Only term while serving in the House.
161	William D. Williamson	DR	ME-4	March 4, 1821	Elected to this Congress: September 10, 1821. Only term while serving in the House.
162	John Wilson	DR	SC-7	March 4, 1821	
163	Samuel H. Woodson	DR	KY-2	March 4, 1821	Only term while serving in the House.
164	Ludwig Worman	F	PA-7	March 4, 1821	Died while still serving in the House.: October 17, 1822
165	John C. Wright	DR	OH-4	March 4, 1821	Resigned, as Representative-elect: March 3, 1821. Only term until 18th Congress.
Members joining the House, after the start of the Congress
...	John S. Smith	DR	KY-7	August 6, 1821	Special election. Only term while serving in the House.
187	John Scott	DR	MO-al	August 10, 1821	First representative from new state. Previously served as Delegate: August 6, 1816 – January 13, 1817 and August 4, 1817–21. Elected to this Congress: August 28, 1821.
...	Lewis Condict	DR	NJ-al	October 9, 1821	Previously served (DR) 1811-17 while in the House. Special election: October 8–9, 1821.
...	David Chambers	DR	OH-4	October 9, 1821	Special election. Only term while serving in the House.
...	John Findlay	DR	PA-5	October 9, 1821	Special election
...	Thomas Murray, Jr.	DR	PA-10	October 9, 1821	Special election. Only term while serving in the House.
...	Charles Borland, Jr.	DR	NY-6	November 8, 1821	Special election: November 6–8, 1821. Only term while serving in the House.
...	James D. Breckinridge	DR	KY-8	November 21, 1821	Special election: November 19, 1821. Only term while serving in the House.
...	Churchill C. Cambreleng	DR	NY-2	December 3, 1821	Elected to this Congress: April 24–26, 1821
...	Samuel Campbell	DR	NY-15	December 3, 1821	Elected to this Congress: April 24–26, 1821. Only term while serving in the House.
...	Alfred Conkling	DR	NY-14	December 3, 1821	Elected to this Congress: April 24–26, 1821. Only term while serving in the House.
...	John Gebhard	F	NY-13	December 3, 1821	Elected to this Congress: April 24–26, 1821. Only term while serving in the House.
...	James Hawkes	DR	NY-15	December 3, 1821	Elected to this Congress: April 24–26, 1821. Only term while serving in the House.
...	Thomas H. Hubbard	DR	NY-17	December 3, 1821	Previously served (DR) 1817–19. Elected to this Congress: April 24–26, 1821. Last term while serving in the House.
...	Joseph Kirkland	F	NY-16	December 3, 1821	Elected to this Congress: April 24–26, 1821. Only term while serving in the House.
...	Elisha Litchfield	DR	NY-19	December 3, 1821	Elected to this Congress: April 24–26, 1821
...	Richard McCarty	DR	NY-8	December 3, 1821	Elected to this Congress: April 24–26, 1821. Only term while serving in the House.
...	John J. Morgan	DR	NY-2	December 3, 1821	Elected to this Congress: April 24–26, 1821
...	Walter Patterson	F	NY-5	December 3, 1821	Elected to this Congress: April 24–26, 1821. Only term while serving in the House.
...	Jeremiah H. Pierson	DR	NY-3	December 3, 1821	Elected to this Congress: April 24–26, 1821. Only term while serving in the House.
...	William B. Rochester	DR	NY-20	December 3, 1821	Elected to this Congress: April 24–26, 1821
...	Charles H. Ruggles	F	NY-7	December 3, 1821	Elected to this Congress: April 24–26, 1821. Only term while serving in the House.
...	Peter Sharpe	DR	NY-1	December 3, 1821	Elected to this Congress: April 24–26, 1821. Unseated, as Representative-elect, after an election contest: December 12, 1821.
...	Elijah Spencer	DR	NY-21	December 3, 1821	Elected to this Congress: April 24–26, 1821. Only term while serving in the House.
...	Micah Sterling	F	NY-18	December 3, 1821	Elected to this Congress: April 24–26, 1821. Only term while serving in the House.
...	Selah Tuthill	DR	NY-6	December 3, 1821	Elected to this Congress: April 24–26, 1821. Died, as Representative-elect: September 7, 1821.
...	William W. Van Wyck	DR	NY-4	December 3, 1821	Elected to this Congress: April 24–26, 1821
...	Reuben H. Walworth	DR	NY-12	December 3, 1821	Elected to this Congress: April 24–26, 1821. Only term while serving in the House.
...	David Woodcock	DR	NY-20	December 3, 1821	Elected to this Congress: April 24–26, 1821. Only term until 20th Congress while serving in the House.
...	Cadwallader D. Colden	F	NY-1	December 12, 1821	Seated, after election contest. Only term while serving in the House.
...	Stephen Van Rensselaer	F	NY-9	February 27, 1822	Special election: February 25–27, 1822
...	Philip Reed	DR	MD-6	March 19, 1822	Previously served (DR) 1817-19 while in the House. Seated, after election contest. Last term while serving in the House.
...	Daniel Rodney	F	DE-al	October 1, 1822	Special election. Only term while serving in the House.
...	Samuel D. Ingham	DR	PA-6	October 8, 1822	Previously served (DR) 1813-July 6, 1818 while in the House. Special election: October 1, 1822.
...	Thomas Forrest	F	PA-1	October 8, 1822	Previously served (F) 1819–21. Special election: October 1, 1822. Last term while serving in the House.
...	Walter Forward	DR	PA-14	October 8, 1822	Special election: October 1, 1822
...	James Stephenson	F	VA-2	October 28, 1822	Previously served (F) 1803-05 and 1809-11 while in the House. Special election: October 7, 8, 10, 14, 28, 1822.
...	Mark Harris	DR	ME-2	December 2, 1822	Special election: September 9, 1822. Only term while serving in the House.
...	Jonathan Jennings	DR	IN-al	December 2, 1822	Previously Delegate: November 27, 1809 – December 11, 1816. Special election: August 5, 1822.
...	Andrew R. Govan	DR	SC-4	December 4, 1822	Special election: October 14–15, 1822
...	Daniel Udree	DR	PA-7	December 10, 1822	Previously served (DR) October 12, 1813–15 and December 26, 1820-21 while in the House. Special election.
...	John Carter	DR	SC-9	December 11, 1822	Special election: October 14–15, 1822
...	James Hamilton, Jr.	DR	SC-2	December 13, 1822	Special election: November 25–26, 1822
...	Isaac McKim	DR	MD-5	January 4, 1823	Special election: January 1, 1823
Non voting members
a	James W. Bates	-	AR-al	December 21, 1819	Delegate from Arkansas Territory. Last term while serving in the House.
b	Solomon Sibley	-	MI-al	November 20, 1820	Delegate from Michigan Territory. Last term while serving in the House.
c	Joseph M. Hernández	-	FL-al	September 30, 1822	[H] Delegate from Florida Territory. Only term while serving in the House.

== See also ==
- 17th United States Congress
- List of United States congressional districts
- List of United States senators in the 17th Congress
