= Senator Kendall =

Senator Kendall may refer to:

- Jonas Kendall (1757–1844), Massachusetts State Senate
- Joseph G. Kendall (1788–1847), Massachusetts State Senate
