= Complaining =

Expression of dissatisfaction

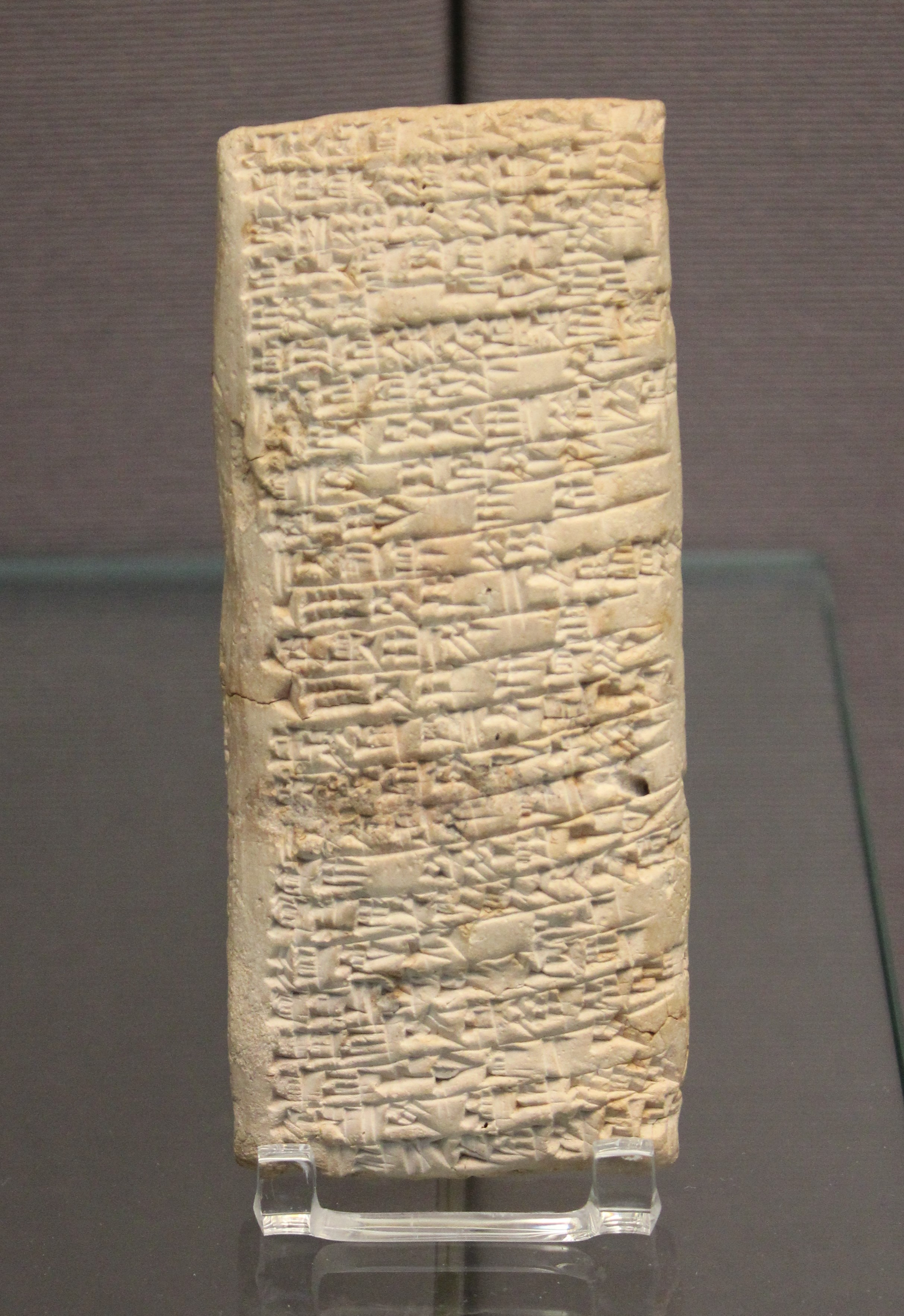
The Complaint tablet to Ea-nāṣir is the oldest known written complaint

Complaining is a form of communication that expresses dissatisfaction regardless of having actually experienced the subjective feeling of dissatisfaction or not. It may serve a range of intrapsychic and interpersonal purposes, including connecting with others who feel similarly displeased, reinforcing a sense of self, or a cathartic expression of personal emotion.

Complaining may be a method of notification, especially in the context of a consumer of goods or services, that one party has failed to satisfy normal standards, and is expected to rectify a perceived grievance, such as replacing a defective item.

Complaining may be formalized into an organizational system of filing a written grievance as part of a dispute resolution process. Alternatively, it may be a purely informal process among friends or acquaintances that allows for the expression and validation of some personal perspective, often referred to as venting. There is some evidence to suggest that complaining may be harmful for physical or mental health by increasing stress levels.

The American proverb, the squeaky wheel gets the grease, is sometimes used to convey the idea that complaining about a problem is an effective means of spurring its resolution, although it has also been noted that there is no necessary correlation between stridency and merit, so that the problem that gets resolved due to complaints may not actually be the most pressing problem requiring resolution.

== Theoretical models ==
Traverso (2009) suggested a structure for complaining behaviour consisting of four stages:

1. Initiation: The complainer wishes to have their problem be acknowledged by the recipient.
2. Core part: In this stage, if the complaint recipient affiliates or agrees with the complaint, the activity proceeds to the next stage. However, if there is rejection, there will be negotiations where the recipient might simply not follow up or challenge the complaint. After more attempts to help co-participants reach affiliation, the next stage will then take place.
3. Complaint Development: The complainant will try to sustain the complaining activity while the recipient will switch to alternative methods of continuing the conversation such as explaining behaviour or even begin criticising the complaint subject themselves. This switch usually develops into other similar activities like criticising and explaining. As a result, the activity continues until the participants can switch topics or come to an agreement.
4. Closing

This model was fit for the purpose of the study it was used in, however, its utility as a general model is limited to only indirect complaints (complaints addressed to a non-present third party) and is not compatible with one-to-one direct complaints (complaints addressed to the complaint recipient). Furthermore, assuming that complaints always go through these stages is unrealistic, there may be cases where a complaint is just noted with no further engagement, terminating the complaint development stage or affiliation does not happen at all where an argument may ensue.

A theoretical model created by Robin Kowalski (1996) suggested that complaining behaviour does not only originate from dissatisfaction, rather it is reliant on two subjective thresholds: the dissatisfaction threshold and complaining threshold. The dissatisfaction and complaining thresholds are the subjective sensitivity and level of tolerances one has for events, where one will feel dissatisfied and/or complain when these experienced events have reached the respective thresholds. Complaining behaviour, regardless of dissatisfaction (dissatisfaction threshold is high or low), occurs only when one perceives complaining able to achieve a desired outcome (complaining threshold is low) such as fixing a relationship problem or increase fair treatment in the office for example.

Although this model illustrates a holistic view of complaining, not narrowing complaining to a behaviour that is always accompanied by dissatisfaction, the model is still too general and explains too little about why complaining happens, the thresholds utilised in the model are not studied enough yet to fully explain complaining behaviour. These thresholds are affected by numerous individual and situational variables such as neuroticism, extraversion, control, etc. The paper does acknowledge and discuss these variables’ potential effects on the thresholds and complaining behaviour, but too few empirical studies have been done to directly investigate those effects. This indicates further research on the relationship between the thresholds, complaining behaviour, and these variables is needed. Perhaps, future studies could create a psychometric measure to gauge people's thresholds to quantitatively test the effect of variables on thresholds and complaining behaviour. Nonetheless, the model still provides a fair general outlook on how individuals may decide to complain.

== Consequences ==
=== Acceptance and rejection of complaints ===
When receiving a complaint from another party, one chooses to either accept or reject the complaint. As mentioned before, complaining serves many functions, but accepting or rejecting a complaint also have several functions depending on the context. These contexts refer to who is complaining, what or who is being complained about and who the complaint recipient is.

In the special issue by Heinemann & Traverso (2009), two categories of complaints were investigated in multiple contexts: direct and indirect.

Direct complaints: Context and social roles play a big part in the dynamic of complaints. When a third party is present in a parent-child argument, the complainant will gain support from the witness to promote the complainants’ views as the complaints serve the purpose of behaviour regulation, but the witness will also actively attempt to prevent the formation of an overly aggressive argument. In the context of emergency phone services however, the reaction to a complaint is not as simple. The emergency phone service worker who in this case, is the subject and receiver of the complaint, will accept the complaint as true but will deflect the blame away from themselves. This serves the function of alleviating responsibility to avoid any potential legal repercussions.

Indirect complaints: Complaints in conversations between friends and family are usually accepted. However, similar to direct complaints, the institutional role one possesses and context may impact their reaction towards certain complaints. For instance, if the complaint is about a work client or an institutional competitor, there will be more acceptance of the complaint. However, there will be rejection when the complaint is about one’s peers. This rejection indicates that institutional roles may influence one’s reaction towards complaints through the need for maintaining loyalty, and their relationships colleagues. The acceptance of complaints against clients may help build a defence against complaints addressed to themselves by constructing a joined front, redirecting the blame to the client. Finally, the acceptance of complaints towards competitors serves the function of building rapport with clients to promote further preference for their own institution.

These studies were done in real-life settings with real caretakers, patients, families, workers etc. This shows that the effects of context and social/institutional roles exist in real-life setting. The sample in the studies were too small due to the time-costly nature as interview studies, meaning that these results cannot be generalised to the whole population until further replication is done.

=== Emotional contagion ===
Bogdan Wojciszke, Wiesław Baryła, Aleksandra Szymków-Sudziarska, Michał Parzuchowski, and Katarzyna Kowalczyk found that when participants listened to or uttered affirmations or complaints, their moods would increase and decrease in equal strength, respectively. The results show that complaining can induce a negative affect within co-participants and the complainer, named the “saying is experiencing effect”. This effect is explained by the underlying mechanism of mood contagion and the dual process theory for social cognition.

Our impulsive system relies on automatic links of similar cues and representations as suggested by Elliot R. Smith and Jamie DeCoster, and due to this it functions under a compatibility principle, where perception, affect and behaviour must be compatible to facilitate each other. Therefore, when one listens and perceives a complaint, a negative event, they will start to experience a negative affect as result of automatic association and mood contagion.

=== Worsening of anger ===
Psychologist Lennis Echterling notes that "[m]erely venting negative emotions by screaming or yelling does not have any health benefits." Research on the subject has noted that venting could make anger worse, not better.

== Types of complaining behaviour ==
Research has identified several distinct types of complaining behaviour with each serving different purposes for the complainer.

=== Instrumental complaining ===
Instrumental complaining is goal-directed and aimed at changing an undesirable situation. When consumers complain about a defective product seeking a replacement, or when employees raise concerns about workplace conditions to management, they are engaging in instrumental complaining. This type of complaining is typically solution-focused and motivated by the desire to rectify a specific problem.

Singh further categorised instrumental consumer complaints into voice responses (complaints directed to the seller), private responses (negative word-of-mouth to friends and family), and third-party responses (complaints to external agencies like consumer protection organisations). Research indicates that these different instrumental channels are often chosen based on the perceived likelihood of successful resolution, with direct voice responses typically attempted first when consumers believe the company will be responsive.

=== Expressive complaining ===
In contrast to instrumental complaining, expressive complaining primarily serves to release emotional tension or express negative feelings without necessarily seeking a solution. This form of complaining is often characterised by venting frustrations about situations that may be beyond one's control, such as complaining about bad weather or traffic congestion. Research suggests that expressive complaining can provide short-term emotional relief through catharsis, though its long-term effectiveness remains debated.

Expressive complaining sometimes takes the form of what Alberts termed "blowing off steam," characterised by heightened emotional expression, repetition, and elaboration of grievances beyond what would be necessary for instrumental purposes. This type of complaining is often recognised as such by both the complainer and the recipient, with an implicit understanding that solutions are not being sought. Studies by Alicke et al. found that approximately 45% of everyday complaints fell primarily into this expressive category.

=== Social complaining ===
Social complaining serves to build or strengthen social bonds through shared grievances. This type of complaining often occurs in group settings where individuals bond over common dissatisfactions, such as colleagues complaining about workplace policies or friends commiserating about relationship challenges. Kowalski notes that social complaining can facilitate group cohesion by highlighting shared values and expressions, creating an "us verses them" dynamic that reinforces social identity.

=== Chronic complaining ===
While most complaining behaviours are situational responses to specific dissatisfactions, chronic complaining represents a more pervasive pattern characterised by frequent complaints across diverse contexts. Chronic complainers tend to perceive more negative events in their environment and have lower thresholds for expressive dissatisfactions.

Research suggests that chronic complaining may be associated with personality traits such as negative affectivity and neuroticism. These individuals often use complaining as their primary mode of social interaction, which can strain relationships over time. Importantly, chronic complaining appears to be self-reinforcing; frequent complainers develop cognitive schemas that facilitate the detection of problems and deficiencies, creating a cycle that maintains their complaining behaviour.

== Psychological functions of complaining ==
Beyond its communicative purposes, complaining serves various psychological functions for individuals.

=== Self-presentation management ===
Complaining can be strategically used to manage others' impressions of oneself. For example, by complaining about high standards not being met, individuals can signal their own elevated standards and values. Similarly, complaining about being overworked may serve to convey dedication and importance. This self-presentation function helps individuals shape how they are perceived by others.

Tactical complaining allows individuals to position themselves favorably within social hierarchies. Alicke et al. found that subjects who complained about intellectual challenges were rated as more intelligent than those who complained about mundane issues. This suggests that the content of complaints can be strategically selected to project desired personal attributes. Similarly, researchers have observed that complaints about high-end products often serve to signal affluence and discernment, rather than merely expressing dissatisfaction.

=== Emotional regulation ===
Complaining can function as an emotional regulation strategy, providing an outlet for negative emotions that might otherwise remain internalised. By expressive dissatisfaction verbally, individuals may experience a reduction in physiological arousal associated with negative emotions. However, research suggests that venting anger through complaining might actually reinforce negative emotional states rather than dissipate them.

Bagozzi et al. demonstrated this complexity in a series of experiments showing that while the immediate act of complaining provides emotional relief, the cognitive rehearsal and elaboration of negative events required for complaining may simultaneously intensify and prolong negative emotions. This paradox helps explain why chronic complainers often report greater dissatisfaction despite (or perhaps because of) their frequent complaining behaviour.

=== Control and agency ===
Complaining can restore a sense of control in situations where individuals feel powerless. By voicing dissatisfaction, complainers assert agency and position themselves as active rather than passive participants in challenging situations. This psychological function is particularly evident in consumer complaints, where the act of complaining transforms the consumer from a victim of poor service to an agent seeking justice.

Research has demonstrated that this sense of regained control contributes significantly to post-complaint satisfaction, independent of whether the original issue is resolved. Their study found that merely having one's complaint acknowledged provided psychological benefits through increased perceived control, even when full redress wasn't provided.

=== Social validation and bonding ===
Complaining often serves a social validation function, where individuals seek confirmation that their perceptions and standards are shared by others. When others agree with or validate a complaint, the complainer receives social confirmation that their expectations and evaluations are reasonable, reinforcing their worldview.

Successful complaints (those that receive agreement or validation) also significantly improved mood and social cohesion among group members. This social validation function helps explain why complaining often occurs in group settings where the complainer can reasonably expect agreement from others. The phenomenon of "reciprocal complaining" (where one person's complaint triggers related complaints from others) further illustrates the social bonding potential of shared grievances.

== See also ==
- Complaint system
- Consumer complaint
- Negativity bias
