= John Reed Sr. =

American politician

Member of the U.S. House of Representatives from Massachusetts's 6th district
- In office March 4, 1795 – March 3, 1801
- Preceded by: District reissued in 1795
- Succeeded by: Josiah Smith

Personal details
- Born: November 11, 1751 Framingham, Province of Massachusetts Bay, British America
- Died: February 17, 1831 (aged 79) West Bridgewater, Massachusetts, U.S.
- Resting place: Old Graveyard, West Bridgewater, Massachusetts
- Party: Federalist
- Education: Yale College
- Profession: Congregational minister

John Reed Sr. (November 11, 1751 – February 17, 1831) was a representative from Massachusetts. Born in Framingham in the Province of Massachusetts Bay, Reed moved with his parents to Titicut Parish, in the northwestern part of Middleboro in 1756. He graduated from Yale College in 1772, studied theology, and was ordained as a Congregational minister in 1780. He served as a chaplain in the United States Navy for two years, then moved to West Bridgewater, Massachusetts in 1780, where he became pastor of the First Congregational Society, which position he retained until his death. He was elected as a Federalist to the Fourth, Fifth, and Sixth Congresses (March 4, 1795 – March 3, 1801). He was not a candidate for renomination in 1800. He again resumed his ministerial duties, and died in West Bridgewater, Plymouth County, Massachusetts. Interment was in the Old Graveyard.

He was the father of John Reed Jr. (1781–1860), a representative from Massachusetts.

U.S. House of Representatives
| Preceded by George Leonard | Member of the U.S. House of Representatives from Massachusetts's 6th congressional district March 4, 1795 - March 3, 1801 | Succeeded by Josiah Smith |
