= George Blake Grinnell =

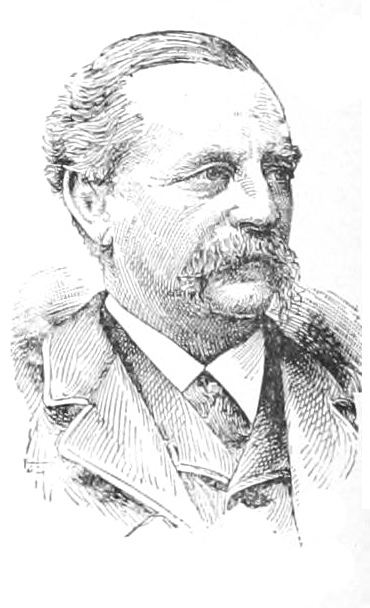
George Blake Grinnell

George Blake Grinell (November 11, 1823 – December 19, 1891) was an American merchant and financier.

Grinnell was born in Greenfield, Massachusetts, the son of George Grinnell Jr. (also spelled Grennell), state senator and U. S. representative, and Eliza Seymour Perkins. He was educated in the public schools of Greenfield, and as a boy went to Auburn, New York, employed in the bank of his uncle, James Seymour. In 1843 he came to New York City, and took a position in the wholesale dry-goods house of his cousin, George Bird. In 1857 he became a partner, and on the death of his cousin he continued the business until 1861, forming a partnership with Levi P. Morton (later Governor of the New York and Vice President of the United States) under the firm name of Morton, Grinnell & Co. which was a successful operation until the breaking out of the Civil War, when it failed along with many other businesses. In 1866 he formed a partnership with Wellington Clapp, with Horace F. Clark as special partner, for the business of stockbroking. The firm was very successful, and was largely employed by Cornelius Vanderbilt. On the retirement of Clapp in 1869, Grinnell continued the business until 1873, when he retired.

In his early life Grinnell was, at different times, director in various organizations and corporations, of the Mutual Life Insurance Company, and various banks. He was a member of the New York Chamber of Commerce.

Grinnell married Helen Alvord Lansing, daughter of Dirck Cornelius and Laura (Alexander) Lansing, on December 21, 1848. He was a member of the Protestant Episcopal church, and for many years vestryman of the Church of the Intercession, Manhattan. His son George Bird Grinnell became a noted explorer and conservationist.
