= Henry Shaw (Massachusetts politician) =

American politician (1788–1857)

Member of the U.S. House of Representatives from Massachusetts's 7th district
- In office March 4, 1817 – March 3, 1821
- Preceded by: John W. Hulbert
- Succeeded by: Henry W. Dwight

Personal details
- Born: 1788 Putney, Vermont
- Died: October 17, 1857 (aged 68–69) Peekskill, New York, U.S.
- Party: Democratic-Republican
- Occupation: Lawyer

Henry Shaw (1788 – October 17, 1857) was a U.S. representative from Massachusetts, son of Samuel Shaw.

== Life ==
Born near Putney, Vermont, Shaw completed preparatory studies. He studied law, was admitted to the bar and commenced practice in Albany, New York, in 1810. He moved to Lanesboro, Massachusetts, in 1813.

Shaw was elected as a Democratic-Republican to the 15th and 16th United States Congresses, holding office from March 4, 1817, to March 3, 1821. He served as member of the Massachusetts House of Representatives from 1824 to 1830 and 1833, and served in the Massachusetts State Senate in 1835.

He was an unsuccessful candidate for Governor of Massachusetts in 1845 and moved to New York City in 1848. He was a member of that city's Board of Education, and was a member of the Common Council. He was a member of the New York State Assembly (New York Co., 10th D.) in 1853. Shaw moved to Newburgh, New York in 1854, and died in Peekskill, New York on October 17, 1857. He was interred in the Lower Cemetery, Lanesboro, Massachusetts.

His son Henry Wheeler Shaw (1818–1885) became a well-known humorist under the pen name Josh Billings.

U.S. House of Representatives
Preceded by John W. Hulbert	Member of the U.S. House of Representatives from Massachusetts's 7th congressional district 1817 – 1821	Succeeded by Henry W. Dwight
New York State Assembly
Preceded by James Monroe	New York State Assembly; New York County, 10th District; 1853	Succeeded by Joseph W. Savage
