= Solomon Strong =

American politician

Member of the U.S. House of Representatives from Massachusetts's 12th district
- In office March 4, 1815 – March 3, 1819
- Preceded by: John W. Hulbert
- Succeeded by: Jonas Kendall

Personal details
- Born: March 2, 1780 Amherst, Massachusetts
- Died: September 16, 1850 (aged 70) Leominster, Massachusetts, U.S.
- Party: Federalist
- Education: Williams College
- Occupation: Lawyer

Solomon Strong (March 2, 1780 – September 16, 1850) was a U.S. representative from Massachusetts.

Born in Amherst, Massachusetts, Strong was graduated from Williams College, Williamstown, Massachusetts, in 1798. He studied law. He was admitted to the bar in Northampton, Massachusetts, in 1800 and commenced the practice of law. He served as member of the State senate in 1812 and 1813. He served as judge of the circuit court of common pleas in 1818 and judge of the court of common pleas from 1821 until his resignation in 1842.

Strong was elected as a Federalist to the Fourteenth and Fifteenth Congresses (March 4, 1815 – March 3, 1819). He was not a candidate for renomination in 1818. He was again a member of the State senate in 1843 and 1844. He died in Leominster, Massachusetts, on September 16, 1850. He was interred in Evergreen Cemetery.

U.S. House of Representatives
Preceded by John W. Hulbert	Member of the U.S. House of Representatives from Massachusetts's 12th congressional district March 3, 1815 - March 3, 1819	Succeeded by Jonas Kendall
