= John W. Hulbert =

American politician

John Whitefield Hulbert

Member of the U.S. House of Representatives from Massachusetts
- In office September 26, 1814 – March 3, 1817
- Preceded by: Daniel Dewey
- Succeeded by: Henry Shaw
- Constituency: 12th district (1814–15); 7th district (1815–17)

Member of The New York State Assembly from Cayuga County
- In office January 4, 1825 – April 21, 1825

Personal details
- Born: June 1, 1770 Alford, Province of Massachusetts Bay, British America
- Died: October 19, 1831 (aged 61) Auburn, New York, U.S.
- Resting place: North Street Cemetery
- Party: Federalist
- Education: Harvard University
- Profession: Lawyer

John Whitefield Hulbert (June 1, 1770 – October 19, 1831) was a U.S. representative from Massachusetts.

Born in Alford in the Province of Massachusetts Bay, Hulbert completed preparatory studies. He graduated from Harvard University in 1795. He studied law. He was admitted to the bar and commenced practice in Alford, Massachusetts, in 1797. He served as director of Berkshire Bank, Pittsfield, Massachusetts.

John W. Hulbert's father, Dr. John Hulbert, was also politically-minded. However, the two had almost completely opposite political inclinations. While John W. Hulbert was a Federalist, Dr. Hulbert was an active participant in the Shays' Rebellion. Having received his medical training in Sharon, Connecticut, he traveled across state lines during the period of unrest in order to raise awareness and recruit for the rebellion.

Connecticut State authorities were notified of his operations, and Dr. Hulbert was arrested. The charges against him and his co-conspirators were dropped after the hawkish Massachusetts governor James Bowdoin was replaced by the more reconciliatory John Hancock.

Hulbert was elected as a Federalist to the Thirteenth Congress to fill the vacancy caused by the resignation of Daniel Dewey. He was reelected to the Fourteenth Congress and served from September 26, 1814, to March 3, 1817. He was not a candidate for renomination in 1816. He moved to Auburn, New York, in 1817. He represented Cayuga County as Member of the New York State Assembly in 1825. He resumed the practice of his profession. He died in Auburn, New York, October 19, 1831. He was interred in North Street Cemetery.

== Notes ==
U.S. House of Representatives
Preceded by Daniel Dewey	Member of the U.S. House of Representatives from Massachusetts's 12th congressional district September 28, 1814 – March 3, 1815	Succeeded by Solomon Strong
Preceded by William Baylies	Member of the U.S. House of Representatives from Massachusetts's 7th congressional district March 4, 1815 – March 3, 1817	Succeeded by Henry Shaw
