= Osmyn Baker =

American politician (1800–1875)

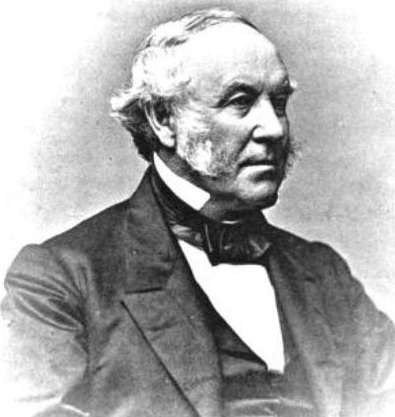

Member of the U.S. House of Representatives from Massachusetts's 6th district
- In office January 14, 1840 – March 3, 1845
- Preceded by: James C. Alvord
- Succeeded by: George Ashmun

Member of the Massachusetts House of Representatives
- In office 1833; 1834; 1836; 1837

Personal details
- Born: May 18, 1800 Amherst, Massachusetts, U.S.
- Died: February 9, 1875 (aged 74) Northampton, Massachusetts, U.S.
- Resting place: Bridge Street Cemetery
- Party: Whig
- Education: Yale College, 1822

Osmyn Baker (May 18, 1800 – February 9, 1875) was a U.S. representative from Massachusetts.

Born in Amherst, Massachusetts, Baker attended Amherst Academy. He was graduated from Yale College in 1822. He studied law at Northampton Law School. He was admitted to the bar and commenced practice in Amherst in 1825. He served as a member of the Massachusetts House of Representatives in 1833, 1834, 1836, and 1837 and was county commissioner of Hampshire County, Massachusetts, from 1834 to 1837.

Baker was elected as a Whig to the Twenty-sixth Congress to fill the vacancy caused by the death of James C. Alvord. Baker was reelected to the Twenty-seventh and Twenty-eighth Congresses and served from January 14, 1840, to March 3, 1845. He served as chairman of the Committee on Accounts (Twenty-seventh Congress). He was not a candidate for renomination in 1844. He resumed the practice of law at Northampton in 1845. Baker was the first president of Smith Charities, serving from 1860 to 1870. He died in Northampton, Massachusetts, February 9, 1875. He was interred in Bridge Street Cemetery.

U.S. House of Representatives
Preceded by James Church Alvord	Member of the U.S. House of Representatives from Massachusetts's 6th congressional district January 14, 1840 – March 3, 1845	Succeeded by George Ashmun
