= George Grennell Jr. =

American politician

Member of the U.S. House of Representatives from Massachusetts
- In office March 4, 1829 – March 3, 1839
- Preceded by: Samuel Clesson Allen
- Succeeded by: James C. Alvord
- Constituency: 7th district (1829–33); 6th district (1833–39)

Member of the Massachusetts State Senate
- In office 1825–1827

Personal details
- Born: December 25, 1786 Greenfield, Massachusetts, U.S.
- Died: November 19, 1877 (aged 90) Greenfield, Massachusetts, U.S.
- Resting place: Green River Cemetery
- Party: Anti-Jacksonian, Whig
- Education: Dartmouth College, 1808
- Profession: Attorney

George Grennell Jr. (Note: Also known as Grinnell) (December 25, 1786 – November 19, 1877) was a U.S. Congressman from Massachusetts. He was born in Greenfield, Massachusetts on December 25, 1786, to parents George and Lydia (Stevens) Grennell. He attended Deerfield Academy and graduated from Dartmouth College in 1808. He was admitted to the bar in 1811 and served as prosecuting attorney for Franklin County 1820–1828.

Grennell was a member of the Massachusetts State Senate 1825–1827. Grennell was elected as an Anti-Jacksonian to the Twenty-first through the Twenty-fourth Congresses and reelected as a Whig to the Twenty-fifth Congress (March 4, 1829 – March 3, 1839). He was not a candidate for renomination in 1838.

Grennell served as a trustee of Amherst College 1838–1859, a judge of probate 1849–1853, clerk of Franklin County Courts 1853–1865, and the first president of the Troy and Greenfield Railroad.

Grennell married twice: first to Helen Adelle Blake in 1814 and second to Eliza Seymour Perkins in 1820. His son George Blake Grinnell became a noted businessman. Grennell died in Greenfield, Massachusetts November 19, 1877 and was interred in Greenfield's Green River Cemetery.

== Notes ==
U.S. House of Representatives
Preceded by Samuel Clesson Allen	Member of the U.S. House of Representatives from Massachusetts's 7th congressional district March 4, 1829 - March 3, 1833	Succeeded by George N. Briggs
Preceded by Joseph G. Kendall	Member of the U.S. House of Representatives from Massachusetts's 6th congressional district March 4, 1833 – March 3, 1839	Succeeded by James Alvord
