= Josh Billings =

American humorist (1818–1885)

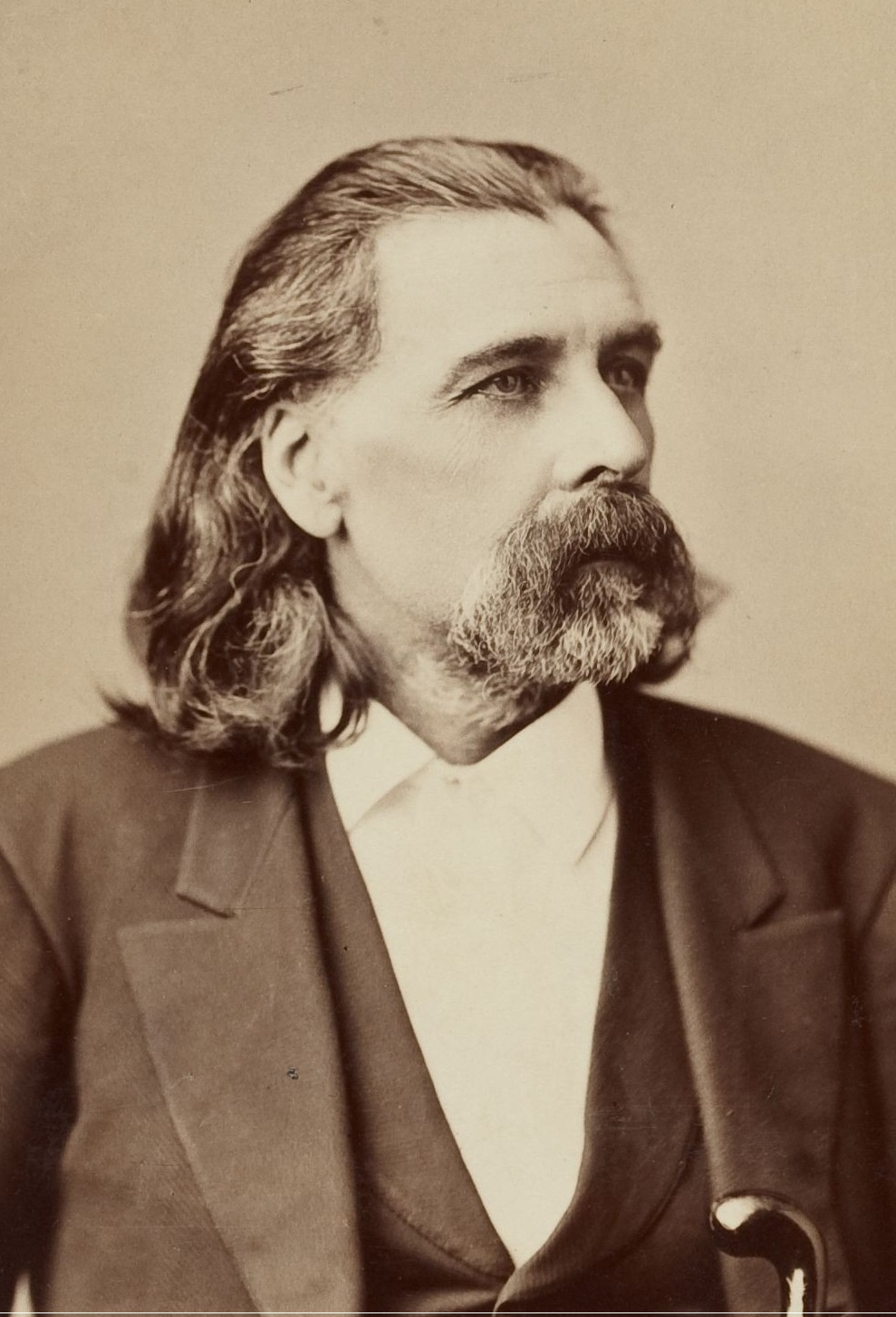
- Born: April 21, 1818; Lanesborough, Massachusetts, U.S.
- Died: October 14, 1885 (aged 67); Monterey, California, U.S.
- Occupation: Writer
- Spouse: Zipha E. (Bradford) Shaw ( – November 12, 1901) (m. 1845)
- Children: Grace Anna Shaw Duff ( – 1923), Kate Alice Shaw Santana
- Parent(s): Henry Shaw (1788–1857), Laura Wheeler Shaw ( – 1883)

Henry Wheeler Shaw (April 21, 1818 – October 14, 1885), better known by the pen name Josh Billings, was a 19th-century American humorist and lecturer.

== Biography ==
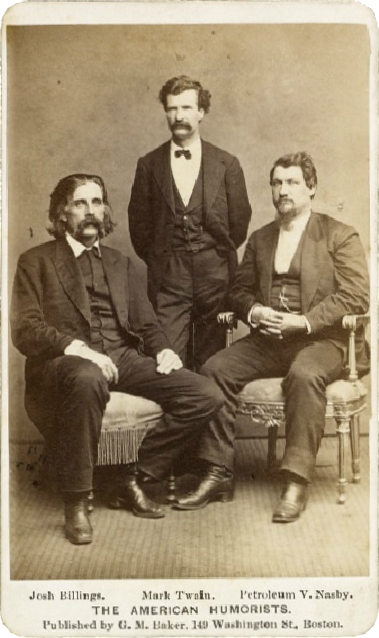
The American Humorists, (from left), Josh Billings, Mark Twain and Petroleum V. Nasby

Shaw was born in Lanesborough, Massachusetts on April 21, 1818. His father was Henry Shaw, who served in the United States House of Representatives from 1817 to 1821, and his grandfather Samuel Shaw who also served in the U.S. Congress from 1808 to 1813. His uncle was John Savage, yet another Congressman.

Shaw attended Hamilton College, but was expelled in his second year for removing the clapper of the campus bell. He married Zilpha E. Bradford in 1845.

Shaw worked as a farmer, coal miner, explorer, and auctioneer before he began making a living as a journalist and writer in Poughkeepsie, New York, in 1858. Under the pseudonym "Josh Billings" he wrote in an informal voice full of the slang of the day, with often eccentric phonetic spelling, dispensing wit and folksy common-sense wisdom. His books include Farmers' Allminax, Josh Billings' Sayings, Everybody's Friend, Choice Bits of American Wit and Josh Billings' Trump Kards. He toured, giving lectures of his writings, which were very popular with the audiences of the day. He was also reputed to be the eponymous author of the "Uncle Ezek's Wisdom" column in the Century Magazine.

Billings died in Monterey, California, on October 14, 1885. Billings' death is described in Chapter 12 of John Steinbeck's fictional Cannery Row. According to Steinbeck's homage, Billings (Shaw's pen-name) died in the Hotel del Monte in Monterey after which his body was delivered for burial preparation by the local constable to the town's only doctor, who also doubled as an amateur mortician. The doctor, per his usual embalming protocol, dispensed of Billings' entrails by tossing them into the gulch behind his house before packing the torso with sawdust. The stomach, liver and intestines were found in the gulch the following morning by a dog whose master, a small boy, intended on using them for fish bait. Some local men, realizing the disgrace this could bring to Monterey—a town proud of its literary heritage—were able to stop the boy as he was preparing to row out to sea, retrieved the tripas and forced the doctor to give Billings' organs a proper burial befitting a great author.

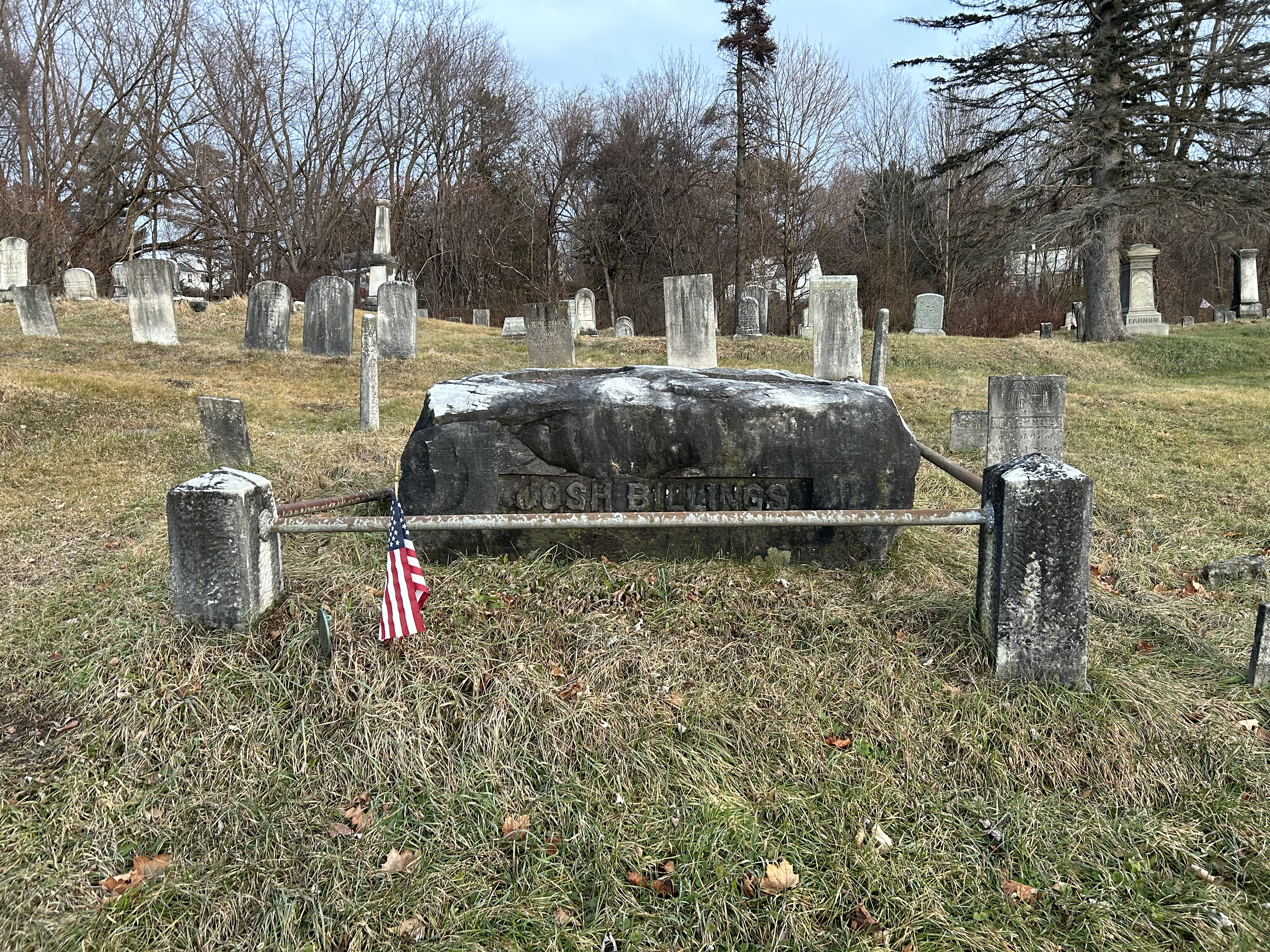
Billings' grave in Lanesborough, Massachusetts

Billings' daughter Grace Shaw Duff donated money for the building of Wilhenford Hospital in Augusta, Georgia, which opened in 1910. The name combined a syllable of her father's' name (Hen) with her husband's and son's.

== Legacy and attributed quotations ==
His saying, "In the whole history of the world there is but one thing that money can not buy... to wit the wag of a dog's tail" appears at the beginning of the Disney film Lady and the Tramp.

The phrase, "Love is like measles... the later in life it occurs, the tougher it gets," was quoted as being Josh Billings' in Jan Karon's book, A Light in the Window.

While the Squeaky Wheel aphorism was used in different forms before Billings, his poem, "The Kicker" brought the idiom into common usage of American language. The term "kicker" at the time in the 1800s was another term for a complainer. The poem is:

I hate to be a kicker,
I always long for peace,
But the wheel that does the squeaking,
Is the one that gets the grease.

"Consider the postage stamp, son. It secures success through its ability to stick to one thing till it gets there."

"Solitude is a good place to visit, but a poor place to stay."

"I honestly believe it iz better tew know nothing than tew know what ain't so." Another variation: "It is better to know less than to know so much that ain't so."

"The old miser who has accumulated his millions, and sits down on them afterwards, reminds me of a fly that has fallen into a barrel of molasses".

"If we had no winter, the spring would not be so pleasant. If we did not sometimes taste adversity, prosperity would not be so welcome."

The term "joshing" or "josh" can be used as a verb meaning to "make fun of" or "to engage in light-hearted teasing". Author Candace Osmond believes the term to be derived from the name of humorist Josh Billings and his writings.

The Hong Kong movie Revenge: A Love Story ends with his quote "There is no revenge so complete as forgiveness."
