= John Locke (Massachusetts politician) =

American politician (1764–1855)

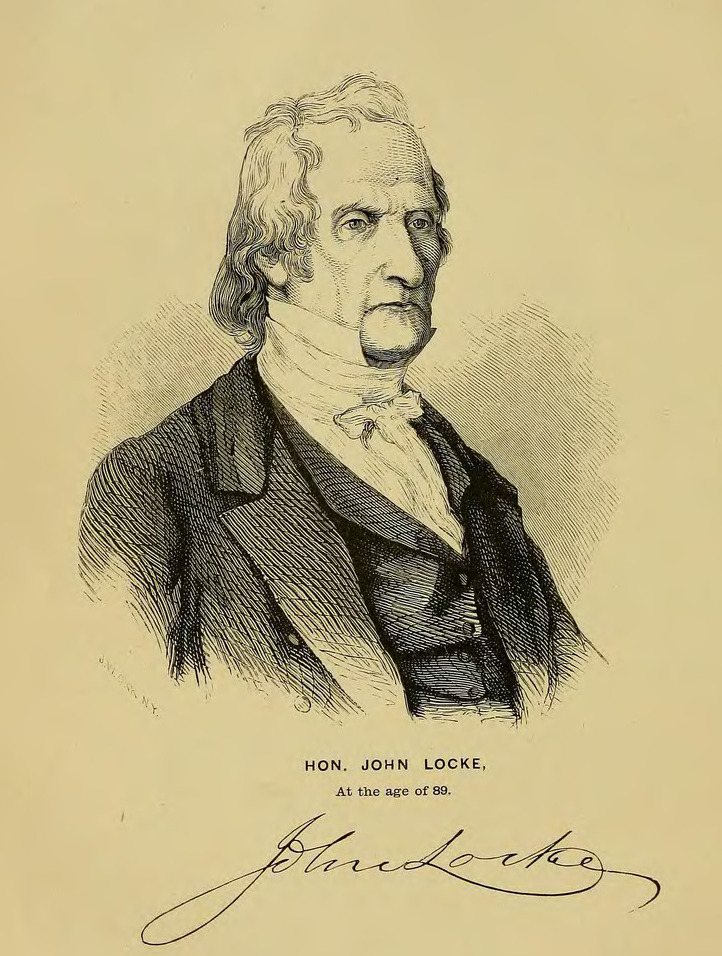

Member of the U.S. House of Representatives from Massachusetts's 6th district
- In office March 4, 1823 – March 3, 1829
- Preceded by: Samuel Clesson Allen
- Succeeded by: Joseph G. Kendall

Member of the Massachusetts House of Representatives
- In office 1804–1805; 1813; 1823

Personal details
- Born: February 14, 1764 Hopkinton, Province of Massachusetts Bay, British America
- Died: March 29, 1855 (aged 91) Boston, Massachusetts, U.S.
- Spouse: Hannah Goodwin
- Profession: Lawyer

John Locke (February 14, 1764 – March 29, 1855) was an American politician and lawyer who served as a U.S. representative from Massachusetts.

== Early life, education, and career ==
Locke was born in Hopkinton in the Massachusetts Bay Colony. He attended Andover Academy and Dartmouth College, eventually graduating from Harvard University in 1792. He was admitted to the Massachusetts bar and began practicing law in Ashby in 1796.

== Political career ==
Locke was a member of the Massachusetts House of Representatives in 1804, 1805, 1813, and 1823. He was a delegate to the Massachusetts Constitutional Convention of 1820–1821. He was elected to the Eighteenth, Nineteenth, and Twentieth U.S. Congress, serving March 4, 1823 to March 3, 1829. He declined to be a candidate for renomination in 1828. Locke was a member of the Massachusetts State Senate in 1830, and of the state executive council in 1831. At this time he also resumed the practice of law.

== Personal life and death ==
Locke married Hannah Goodwin. Locke died in Boston, Massachusetts on March 29, 1855; he is interred in Lowell Cemetery in Lowell.

U.S. House of Representatives
Preceded by Samuel C. Allen	Member of the U.S. House of Representatives from Massachusetts's 6th congressional district March 4, 1823 – March 3, 1829	Succeeded by Joseph G. Kendall
