= Josiah Smith =

American politician (1738–1803)

Member of the U.S. House of Representatives from Massachusetts's 6th district
- In office March 4, 1801 – March 3, 1803
- Preceded by: John Reed Sr.
- Succeeded by: Samuel Taggart

Member of the Massachusetts Senate
- In office 1792-1794; 1797

Member of the Massachusetts House of Representatives
- In office 1789-1790

Personal details
- Born: February 26, 1738 Pembroke, Province of Massachusetts Bay, British America
- Died: April 4, 1803 (aged 65) Pembroke, Massachusetts, U.S.
- Resting place: Pembroke Cemetery
- Party: Democratic-Republican
- Children: Albert Smith
- Education: Harvard College, 1774
- Profession: Attorney

Josiah Smith (February 26, 1738 – April 4, 1803) was a United States representative from Massachusetts. Born in Pembroke in the Province of Massachusetts Bay, to Reverend Thomas Smith and Judith Miller Smith. Smith graduated from Harvard College in 1774, studied law, was admitted to the bar and practiced.

== Service in Congress ==
Smith was elected as a Democratic-Republican to the Seventh Congress, serving from March 4, 1801 to March 3, 1803. He was not a candidate for renomination in 1802.

== Death and burial ==
On his way home from Washington, Smith contracted smallpox in New York, he died in Pembroke. Smith was interred in Center Cemetery, Pembroke, Massachusetts.

U.S. House of Representatives
Preceded by John Reed, Sr.	Member of the U.S. House of Representatives from Massachusetts's 6th congressional district March 4, 1801 – March 3, 1803	Succeeded by Samuel Taggart
