= Samuel Taggart =

American politician

Member of the U.S. House of Representatives from Massachusetts's 6th district
- In office March 4, 1803 – March 3, 1817
- Preceded by: Josiah Smith
- Succeeded by: Samuel Clesson Allen

Personal details
- Born: March 24, 1754 Londonderry, Province of New Hampshire, British America
- Died: April 25, 1825 (aged 71) Colrain, Massachusetts, U.S.
- Resting place: Chandler Hill Cemetery; Colrain, Massachusetts
- Party: Federalist
- Spouse(s): Elizabeth Duncan Taggart; Mary Ayer Taggart
- Children: Robert Taggart; Samuel D. Taggart; Daniel Taggart; Jean Taggart; Elizabeth Betsy Taggart; James Taggart; George Taggart; Mary Polly Taggart; Rufus Taggart; Esther Taggart; Lucy Taggart; Moses Taggart; Catherine Taggart; Mary Ann Taggart; William Ayer Taggart
- Education: Dartmouth College, 1774
- Occupation: Minister; Politician; Farmer
- Profession: Presbyterian Minister

Samuel Taggart (March 24, 1754 – April 25, 1825) was a Presbyterian minister, an American politician and a U. S. representative from Massachusetts.

== Early life ==
The son of Matthew Taggart, he was born in Londonderry in the Province of New Hampshire on March 24, 1754. Taggart completed preparatory studies, and graduated from Dartmouth College in 1774. He studied theology and was licensed to preach.

== Career ==
Ordained to the Presbyterian ministry on February 19, 1777, Taggart was installed as pastor of a church in Colrain, Massachusetts. He then journeyed as a missionary through western New York.

Taggart was elected as a Federalist to the Eighth and to the six succeeding Congresses, serving as a United States representative for the sixth district of the state of Massachusetts (March 4, 1803 – March 3, 1817). He was not a candidate for renomination in 1816, but continued his service as pastor of the Colrain Presbyterian Church until October 28, 1818, when he resigned.

== Death ==
Taggart died on his farm in Colrain, Massachusetts, on April 25, 1825 (age 71 years, 32 days). He is interred at Chandler Hill Cemetery.

== Family life ==
Born son of James and Jean Anderson Taggart, he married Elizabeth Duncan in 1777 and they had twelve children: Robert, Samuel D., Daniel, Jean, Elizabeth Betsy, James, George, Mary Polly, Rufus, Esther, Lucy, and Moses. Elizabeth died on March 4, 1815, and he married Mary Ayer on March 25, 1816. They had three children: Catherine, Mary Ann, and William Ayer.

== Bibliography ==
- Taggart, Samuel. “Letters of Samuel Taggart: Representative in Congress from 1803 to 1814: Part I, 1803-1807” Edited by George H. Haynes. Proceedings of the American Antiquarian Society 33 (April 1923): 113–226.
- Taggart, Samuel. “Letters of Samuel Taggart: Representative in Congress from 1803 to 1814: Part II, 1808-1814" Edited by George H. Haynes. Proceedings of the American Antiquarian Society 33 (October 1923): 297–438.

U.S. House of Representatives
Preceded by Josiah Smith	Member of the U.S. House of Representatives from Massachusetts's 6th congressional district March 4, 1803 – March 3, 1817	Succeeded by Samuel Clesson Allen
