= James C. Alvord =

American politician (1808–1839)

James Church Alvord
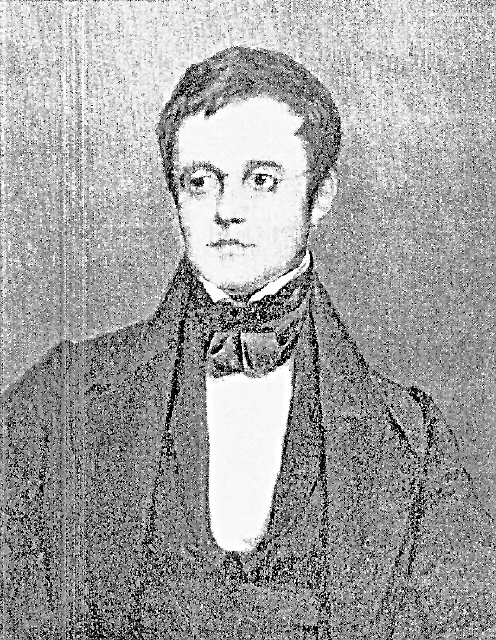

Member of the U.S. House of Representatives from Massachusetts's 6th district
- In office March 4, 1839 – September 27, 1839
- Preceded by: George Grennell Jr.
- Succeeded by: Osmyn Baker

Member of the Massachusetts Senate
- In office 1838

Personal details
- Born: April 14, 1808 Greenwich, Massachusetts, U.S.
- Died: September 27, 1839 (aged 31) Greenfield, Massachusetts, U.S.
- Resting place: Federal Street Cemetery
- Party: Whig
- Education: Dartmouth College

James Church Alvord (April 14, 1808 – September 27, 1839) was a U.S. representative from Massachusetts.

Born in Greenwich, Massachusetts, Alvord completed preparatory studies and was graduated from Dartmouth College, Hanover, New Hampshire, in 1827. He studied law and was admitted to the bar in 1830, commencing the practice of his profession in Greenfield, Massachusetts. He served as member of the State house of representatives in 1837. He served in the State senate in 1838.

Alvord was elected as a Whig to the Twenty-sixth Congress and served from March 4, 1839, until his death in Greenfield, Massachusetts, on September 27, 1839, before the Congress assembled. He was interred in Federal Street Cemetery.

== See also ==
- List of members of the United States Congress who died in office (1790–1899)

U.S. House of Representatives
Preceded by George Grennell, Jr.	Member of the U.S. House of Representatives from Massachusetts's 6th congressional district March 4, 1839 – September 27, 1839	Succeeded by Osmyn Baker
Political offices
Preceded by	Member of the Massachusetts House of Representatives; 1838	Succeeded by
Preceded by	Member of the Massachusetts State Senate; 1837	Succeeded by
