= List of United States senators in the 17th Congress =

This is a complete list of United States senators during the 17th United States Congress listed by seniority from March 4, 1821, to March 3, 1823.

Order of service is based on the commencement of the senator's first term. Behind this is former service as a senator (only giving the senator seniority within their new incoming class), service as vice president, a House member, a cabinet secretary, or a governor of a state. The final factor is the population of the senator's state.

The two main parties at this point were the Federalists (F), and Democratic Republicans (DR).

== Terms of service ==
Class	Terms of service of senators that expired in years
Class 2	Terms of service of senators that expired in 1823 (AL, DE, GA, IL, KY, LA, MA, ME, MS, NC, NH, NJ, RI, SC, TN, and VA.)
Class 3	Terms of service of senators that expired in 1825 (AL, CT, DE, IN, MA, MD, ME, MO, MS, NH, NJ, NY, OH, PA, RI, SC, and VT.)
Class 1	Terms of service of senators that expired in 1827 (CT, GA, IL, IN, KY, LA, MD, MO, NC, NY, OH, PA, TN, VA, and VT.)

== U.S. Senate seniority list ==
U.S. Senate seniority
Rank	Senator (party-state)	Seniority date	Other factors
1	John Gaillard (DR-SC)	December 6, 1804	
2	Rufus King (F-NY)	March 4, 1813	
3	James Barbour (DR-VA)	January 2, 1815	
4	Benjamin Ruggles (DR-OH)	March 4, 1815	
5	John Williams (DR-TN)	October 10, 1815	
6	Nathaniel Macon (DR-NC)	December 5, 1815	
7	Montfort Stokes (DR-NC)	December 4, 1816	North Carolina 4th in population (1810)
8	William Smith (DR-SC)	December 4, 1816	South Carolina 6th in population (1810)
9	James Noble (DR-IN)	December 11, 1816	Alphabetical (N)
10	Waller Taylor (DR-IN)	December 11, 1816	Alphabetical (T)
11	Harrison Gray Otis (F-MA)	March 4, 1817	Former representative (4 years)
12	Nicholas Van Dyke (F-DE)	March 4, 1817	Former representative (3 years)
13	Mahlon Dickerson (DR-NJ)	March 4, 1817	Former governor
14	David Lawrence Morril (DR-NH)	March 4, 1817	
15	Thomas Hill Williams (DR-MS)	December 10, 1817	
16	Henry Johnson (DR-LA)	January 12, 1818	
17	William Adams Palmer (DR-VT)	October 20, 1818	
18	Jesse Burgess Thomas (DR-IL)	December 3, 1818	Former delegate
19	Ninian Edwards (DR-IL)	December 3, 1818	
20	James Brown (DR-LA)	March 4, 1819	Former senator
21	Edward Lloyd (DR-MD)	March 4, 1819	Former representative (2 years, 3 months)
22	John Fabyan Parrott (DR-NH)	March 4, 1819	Former representative (2 years, 0 months)
23	Walter Lowrie (DR-PA)	March 4, 1819	Pennsylvania 3rd in population (1810)
24	James Lanman (DR-CT)	March 4, 1819	Connecticut 9th in population (1810)
25	John Elliott (DR-GA)	March 4, 1819	Georgia 11th in population (1810)
26	William Allen Trimble (DR-OH)	March 4, 1819	Ohio 13th in population (1810)
27	Freeman Walker (DR-GA)	November 6, 1819	
28	Richard Mentor Johnson (DR-KY)	December 10, 1819	
29	James Pleasants (DR-VA)	December 14, 1819	Former representative (8 years)
30	William Rufus de Vane King (DR-AL)	December 14, 1819	Former representative (5 years)
31	John Williams Walker (DR-AL)	December 14, 1819	
32	William Pinkney (F-MD)	December 21, 1819	
33	Elijah Hunt Mills (DR-MA)	June 12, 1820	
34	John Holmes (DR-ME)	June 13, 1820	
35	John Chandler (DR-ME)	June 14, 1820	
36	David Holmes (DR-MS)	August 30, 1820	
37	Isham Talbot (DR-KY)	October 19, 1820	
38	Nehemiah Rice Knight (DR-RI)	January 9, 1821	
39	Samuel Lewis Southard (DR-NJ)	January 26, 1821	
40	Martin Van Buren (DR-NY)	March 4, 1821	New York 1st in population (1810)
41	Elijah Boardman (DR-CT)	March 4, 1821	Connecticut 9th in population (1810)
42	Horatio Seymour (DR-VT)	March 4, 1821	Vermont 15th in population (1810)
43	James De Wolf (DR-RI)	March 4, 1821	Rhode Island 17th in population (1810)
44	David Barton (DR-MO)	August 10, 1821	Alphabetical (Ba)
45	Thomas Hart Benton (DR-MO)	August 10, 1821	Alphabetical (Be)
46	John Henry Eaton (DR-TN)	September 27, 1821	
47	Nicholas Ware (DR-GA)	November 10, 1821	
48	William Findlay (DR-PA)	December 10, 1821	
49	Ethan Allen Brown (DR-OH)	January 3, 1822	
50	Caesar Augustus Rodney (DR-DE)	January 24, 1822	
51	James Lloyd (F-MA)	June 5, 1822	
52	William Kelly (DR-AL)	December 12, 1822	
53	Samuel Smith (DR-MD)	December 17, 1822	
54	John Taylor of Caroline (DR-VA)	December 18, 1822	Former senator

== See also ==
- 17th United States Congress
- List of United States representatives in the 17th Congress
