= Samuel Clesson Allen =

American politician (1772–1842)

Member of the U.S. House of Representatives from Massachusetts
- In office March 4, 1817 – March 3, 1829
- Preceded by: Samuel Taggart
- Succeeded by: George Grennell Jr.
- Constituency: 6th district (1817–23); 7th district (1823–29)

Member of the Massachusetts House of Representatives
- In office 1806–1810

Member of the Massachusetts Senate
- In office 1812–1815

Personal details
- Born: January 5, 1772 Bernardston, Province of Massachusetts Bay, British America
- Died: February 8, 1842 (aged 70) Northfield, Massachusetts, U.S.
- Party: Federalist Party, Adams, Massachusetts Workingmen's Party

Samuel Clesson Allen (January 5, 1772 – February 8, 1842) was a U.S. politician from Massachusetts during the first third of the 19th century. He began his career as a member of the Federalist Party, but later became a staunch supporter of Democratic presidents Andrew Jackson and Martin Van Buren.

Allen was born in Bernardston in the Province of Massachusetts Bay and schooled in nearby New Salem. He was descended from Edward Allen (1640–1696), who was born in England and settled in the Connecticut Colony. He graduated from Dartmouth College in 1794, and was ordained as a Congregational minister. After serving three years in the pulpit, Allen began to study law, and was admitted to the Massachusetts bar in 1800.

Allen began his career in politics in 1806, when he was elected to the Massachusetts House of Representatives. He served in the House until 1810, then served in the Massachusetts Senate from 1812 to 1815. A year after leaving the state senate, he was elected to the United States House of Representatives, where he sat as a Federalist from 1817 to 1829. He was a noted supporter of the John Quincy Adams administration.

After returning to Massachusetts, Allen became affected by the plight of western Massachusetts farmers and laborers, whose lives were being upended by industrialization. As a result of his observations and concerns, Allen became a vocal supporter of the Massachusetts Workingmen's Party, and was the party's unsuccessful nominee for state governor in 1833 and 1834.

Allen died in Northfield, Massachusetts, and was buried in Bernardston.

== Legacy ==
Allen's son, Elisha Hunt Allen, also served in the United States Congress.

== References and external links ==
- United States Congress. "Samuel Clesson Allen (id: A000146)". Biographical Directory of the United States Congress.
- Schlesinger, Arthur M, Jr. The Age of Jackson. Boston : Little, Brown, 1953 [1945].

U.S. House of Representatives
Preceded by Samuel Taggart	Member of the U.S. House of Representatives from Massachusetts's 6th congressional district March 4, 1817 – March 3, 1823	Succeeded by John Locke
Preceded by Henry W. Dwight	Member of the U.S. House of Representatives from Massachusetts's 7th congressional district March 4, 1823 – March 3, 1829	Succeeded by George Grennell, Jr.
