= The squeaky wheel gets the grease =

American proverb

The squeaky wheel gets the grease is an American aphorism or metaphor attesting that matters that draw attention to themselves are more likely to be addressed than those that do not. The term makes no necessary correlation between the volume of a complaint and its stridency with its merit.

== History ==
The origin of the squeaky wheel metaphor is unknown, but its current form is attributed to American humorist Josh Billings (the pen name of Henry Wheeler Shaw), who is said to have popularized it in his putative poem "The Kicker" (c. 1870)

I hate to be a kicker,
I always long for peace,
But the wheel that squeaks the loudest,
Is the one that gets the grease.

However, this poem has been attributed to various authors, anonymous or otherwise, and its provenance has never been verified. The first known publication of the poem was in 1910. For unknown reasons, in 1937 Bartlett's Familiar Quotations attributed the poem to Shaw.

Other variations exist, and suggest that being heard gets attention, and prolongs the life of the hub, whereas a silent hub may be overlooked and neglected.

== In other cultures ==
=== Parallels ===
- The Chinese proverbs "会哭的孩子有奶吃" ("The crying baby gets the milk")
- The German version "Das Rad, das am lautesten quietscht, bekommt das meiste Fett ("The wheel that squeaks the loudest gets most of the grease.")
- The Portuguese proverb "Quem não chora, não mama" ("He who does not cry does not get breastfed.")
- The Spanish proverb "El que no llora no mama" ("He who does not cry does not get breastfed.")

=== Contrasts ===
- The Japanese proverb, "The stake that sticks up gets hammered down", or "The nail that stands out gets pounded down," (出る釘は打たれる, deru kugi wa utareru),
- The Dutch proverbs "Tall trees catch loads of wind" ("Hoge bomen vangen veel wind", implying they are the first to go down) and "[The wheat that's growing] above the mowing line [gets cut down]" ("[Koren dat] boven het maaiveld uitsteekt [wordt afgehakt]").
- The Korean maxim "모난 돌이 정 맞는다: Pointy stone meets chisel."
- The Spanish proverb, "El clavo que sobresale recibe el martillazo", "The nail that stands out gets hammered down" (implying that the best workers get rewarded with more work)
- The US proverb "The quacking duck gets shot"

=== Other ===
Related or contrasting sentiments include:

- Tall poppy syndrome, where those who stand out most attract criticism, a popular term in Commonwealth countries
- Law of Jante, an attitude of disapproval toward exhibitions of individuality or personal success, rooted in Scandinavia
