= Francis Baylies =

American politician (1783–1852)

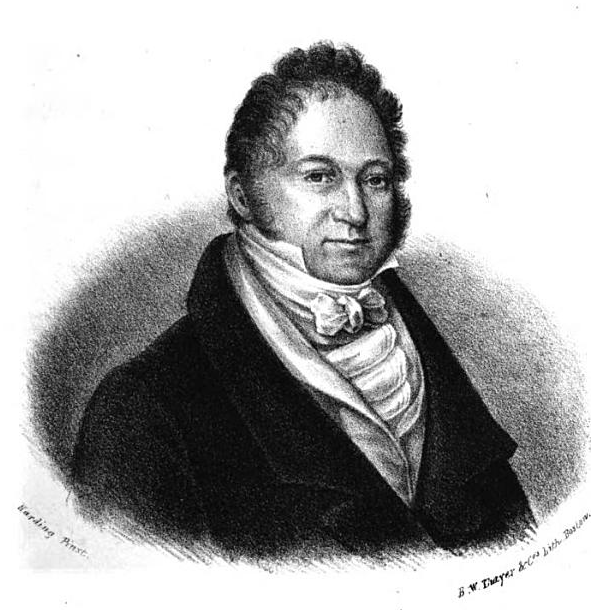

Member of the U.S. House of Representatives from Massachusetts
- In office March 4, 1821 – March 3, 1827
- Preceded by: Marcus Morton
- Succeeded by: James L. Hodges
- Constituency: 10th district (1821–23); 12th district (1823–27)

Member of the Massachusetts House of Representatives
- In office 1827–1832

United States Chargé d'Affaires, Argentina
- In office 15 June 1832 – 26 September 1832
- Preceded by: John Murray Forbes
- Succeeded by: William Brent Jr.

Member of the Massachusetts House of Representatives
- In office 1835

Personal details
- Born: October 16, 1783 Taunton, Massachusetts
- Died: October 28, 1852 (aged 69) Taunton, Massachusetts, U.S.
- Resting place: Old Plain Cemetery
- Party: Federalist; Jackson Federalist; Democratic
- Spouse: Elizabeth Moulton
- Children: 1
- Profession: Lawyer
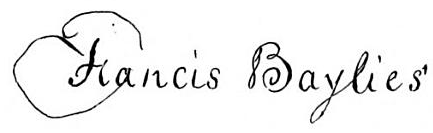
- Signature

Francis Baylies (October 16, 1783 – October 28, 1852) was a U.S. representative from Massachusetts, and brother of congressman William Baylies.

Baylies was born in Taunton, Massachusetts, in 1783, the son of Dr. William Baylies (1742–1826). He studied law, and was admitted to the bar in 1810 and commenced practice in Taunton, Massachusetts. He later served as Register of Probate for Bristol County 1812–1820. He was an unsuccessful candidate for election in 1818 to the Sixteenth Congress.

Baylies was elected as a Federalist to the Seventeenth Congress, a Jackson Federalist to the Eighteenth Congress, and a Jacksonian to the Nineteenth Congress (March 4, 1821 – March 3, 1827). He was an unsuccessful candidate in 1827 for reelection to the Twentieth Congress. He served as member of the Massachusetts House of Representatives from 1827 to 1832.

Jackson then appointed him to the post of United States chargé d'affaires in Buenos Aires in the Argentine Confederation following the raid on the Falkland Islands by USS Lexington in 1831. USS Peacock conveyed Mr. Baylies and family to la Plata and on the occasion, both the British line-of-battle ship Plantagenet and frigate Druid complemented her flag by playing Hail, Columbia. His very short term in office was due to the unsettled conditions of the time.

Baylies was again elected to the Massachusetts House of Representatives in 1835. He engaged in literary pursuits. He died in Taunton, Massachusetts, October 28, 1852, and was interred in the Old Plain Cemetery.

== Writings ==
- An Historical Memoir of the Colony of New Plymouth (1830).
- Massachusetts Historical Society, Letters of Francis Baylies 1827–1834. in Proceedings of the Massachusetts Historical Society. vol. 45, Pages 166 -184, (1912).

U.S. House of Representatives
| Preceded by Marcus Morton | Member of the U.S. House of Representatives from Massachusetts's 10th congressional district March 4, 1821 – March 3, 1823 | Succeeded by John Bailey |
| Preceded by Lewis Bigelow | Member of the U.S. House of Representatives from Massachusetts's 12th congressional district March 4, 1823 – March 3, 1827 | Succeeded by James L. Hodges |
Political offices
| Preceded by | Register of Probate, Bristol County, Massachusetts; 1812-1820 | Succeeded by |
| Preceded by | Member of the Massachusetts House of Representatives; 1827-1832 | Succeeded by |
| Preceded by | Member of the Massachusetts House of Representatives; 1835-1835 | Succeeded by |
Diplomatic posts
| Preceded by John M. Forbes | United States Chargé d'Affaires, Argentina; 15 June 1832–26 September 1832 | Succeeded by William Brent, Jr. |
