= Jonas Kendall =

American politician

Jonas Henry Kendall

Member of the U.S. House of Representatives from Massachusetts's 12th district
- In office March 4, 1819 – March 3, 1821
- Preceded by: Solomon Strong
- Succeeded by: Lewis Bigelow

Personal details
- Born: October 27, 1757 Leominster, Province of Massachusetts Bay, British America
- Died: October 22, 1844 (aged 86) Leominster, Massachusetts, U.S.
- Party: Federalist
- Occupation: Paper manufacturer

Jonas Kendall (October 27, 1757 – October 22, 1844) was a U.S. representative from Massachusetts, father of Joseph Gowing Kendall.

Born in Leominster in the Province of Massachusetts Bay, Kendall pursued an academic course. He engaged in the manufacture of paper in Leominster, Massachusetts, in 1796. He served as a member of the Massachusetts House of Representatives in 1800, 1801 from 1803 to 1807, and 1821, and in the Massachusetts Senate from 1808 to 1811. He served as a member of the school board in 1803, 1811, and 1814 and as a member of the executive council in 1822. He was a presidential elector on the Federalist ticket in 1816.

Kendall was elected as a Federalist to the Sixteenth Congress (March 4, 1819 – March 3, 1821). He was an unsuccessful candidate for reelection in 1820 to the Seventeenth Congress. He resumed the manufacture of paper.

He died in Leominster, Massachusetts and was interred in Evergreen Cemetery.

U.S. House of Representatives
Preceded by Solomon Strong	Member of the U.S. House of Representatives from Massachusetts's 12th congressional district March 3, 1819 – March 3, 1821	Succeeded by Lewis Bigelow
