= Lewis Bigelow =

American politician

Member of the U.S. House of Representatives from Massachusetts's 12th district
- In office March 4, 1821 – March 3, 1823
- Preceded by: Jonas Kendall
- Succeeded by: Francis Baylies

Personal details
- Born: August 18, 1785 Petersham, Massachusetts
- Died: October 2, 1838 (aged 53) Peoria, Illinois, U.S.
- Party: Federalist
- Education: Williams College
- Occupation: Lawyer

Lewis Bigelow (August 18, 1785 – October 2, 1838) was a U.S. representative from Massachusetts.

Born in Petersham, Massachusetts, Bigelow graduated from Williams College, Williamstown, Massachusetts, in 1803. He was admitted to the bar and commenced practice in Petersham. He served as member of the State senate 1819–1821. He was editor of the first seventeen volumes of Massachusetts Reports and of a digest of six volumes of Pickering's Reports.

Bigelow was elected as a Federalist to the Seventeenth Congress (March 4, 1821 – March 4, 1823). He moved to Peoria, Illinois, in 1831 and continued the practice of law. He was interested in the real estate business and in the operation of ferry boats. He served as Justice of the Peace. He was appointed clerk of the circuit court of Peoria County, November 26, 1835, and served until his death in Peoria, Illinois, October 2, 1838.

U.S. House of Representatives
Preceded by Jonas Kendall	Member of the U.S. House of Representatives from Massachusetts's 12th congressional district March 4, 1821 - March 3, 1823	Succeeded by Francis Baylies
