= Henry W. Dwight =

American politician

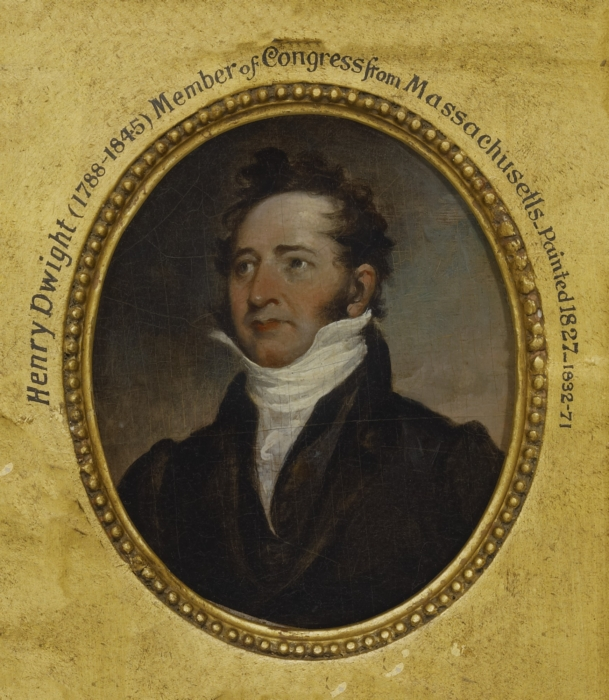
- Portrait of Henry W. Dwight by John Trumbull, 1827. Yale University Art Gallery

Member of the U.S. House of Representatives from Massachusetts
- In office March 4, 1821 – March 3, 1831
- Preceded by: Henry Shaw
- Succeeded by: George N. Briggs
- Constituency: 7th district (1821–1823); 9th district (1823–1831)

Personal details
- Born: February 26, 1788 Stockbridge, Massachusetts, U.S.
- Died: February 21, 1845 (aged 56) New York City, New York, U.S.
- Party: Federalist; National Republican
- Education: Williams College
- Occupation: Lawyer

Henry Williams Dwight (February 26, 1788 – February 21, 1845) was a lawyer and politician who became U.S. Representative from Massachusetts.

== Life ==
Born February 26, 1788 in Stockbridge, Massachusetts, his father was also named Henry Williams Dwight (1757–1804) and mother was Abigail Welles (1763–1840). His grandfather was Joseph Dwight (1703–1765), and mother traced her ancestry to Thomas Welles (1590–1659). Dwight was a trustee of Williams College in Williamstown, Massachusetts from 1829-1837. He was admitted to the Massachusetts bar in 1809 and practiced in Stockbridge. During the War of 1812 Dwight served as aide-de-camp with the rank of colonel on the staff of General Whiton, and kept the title colonel for the rest of his life. He served as member of the Massachusetts State house of representatives in 1818.

Dwight was elected as a Federalist to the Seventeenth Congress starting on March 4, 1821. He was reelected as an Adams-Clay Federalist to the Eighteenth Congress.

Dwight was elected as an Adams candidate to the Nineteenth and Twentieth Congresses. Dwight was reelected as an Anti-Jacksonian to the Twenty-first Congress until March 3, 1831. He was not a candidate for renomination in 1830 to the Twenty-second Congress. He was again a member of the State house of representatives in 1834.

He received an honorary degree from William College, and as a trustee nominated Mark Hopkins as a replacement professor in 1830. He bred purebred sheep, horses, and cattle. He married Frances Fowler (1797–after 1874) on November 10, 1824. They had one daughter who died young, and two sons. Henry Williams Dwight, 3rd was born September 23, 1825, and died May 16, 1861. James Fowler Dwight was born January 30, 1830, joined the Union Army in the American Civil War and rose to rank of colonel. Dwight died in New York City on February 21, 1845. He was interred in Stockbridge Cemetery, Stockbridge, Massachusetts.

== See also ==
- New England Dwight family

U.S. House of Representatives
Preceded by Henry Shaw	Member of the U.S. House of Representatives from Massachusetts's 7th congressional district March 4, 1821 – March 3, 1823	Succeeded by Samuel C. Allen
Preceded by John Reed, Jr.	Member of the U.S. House of Representatives from Massachusetts's 9th congressional district March 4, 1823 – March 3, 1831	Succeeded by George N. Briggs
