= Joseph G. Kendall =

American politician (1788–1847)

Joseph Gowing Kendall

Member of the U.S. House of Representatives from Massachusetts's 6th district
- In office March 4, 1829 – March 3, 1833
- Preceded by: John Locke
- Succeeded by: George Grennell, Jr.

Member of the Massachusetts Senate
- In office 1824-1828

Personal details
- Born: October 27, 1788 Leominster, Massachusetts, U.S.
- Died: October 2, 1847 (aged 58) Worcester, Massachusetts, U.S.
- Resting place: Evergreen Cemetery, Leominster, Massachusetts
- Education: Harvard
- Profession: Attorney

Joseph Gowing Kendall (October 27, 1788 – October 2, 1847) was a U.S. representative from Massachusetts, son of Jonas Kendall.

Born in Leominster, Massachusetts, Kendall pursued classical studies. He graduated from Harvard University in 1810 and taught there from 1812 to 1817. He studied law, and was admitted to the bar in 1818 and practiced in Leominster. Kendall was elected to the Massachusetts State Senate in 1824 and served four years.

Kendall was elected as an Anti-Jacksonian to the Twenty-first and Twenty-second Congresses (March 4, 1829 – March 3, 1833). He was not a candidate for renomination in 1832. He was appointed clerk of the courts of Worcester County in 1833 and served until his death.

He moved to Worcester, Massachusetts, in 1833 and died there October 2, 1847. He was interred in Evergreen Cemetery, Leominster, Massachusetts.

U.S. House of Representatives
Preceded by John Locke	Member of the U.S. House of Representatives from Massachusetts's 6th congressional district March 4, 1829 – March 3, 1833	Succeeded by George Grennell, Jr.
