= Massachusetts's 6th congressional district =

U.S. House district for Massachusetts

Coordinates: 42°37′02″N 70°53′07″W

- Interactive map of district boundaries since January 3, 2023
- Representative: Seth Moulton; D–Salem
- Area: 480.31 mi^{2} (1,244.0 km^{2})
- Distribution: 73.15% urban; 26.85% rural
- Population (2025): 799,004
- Median household income: $121,929
- Ethnicity: 76.7% White; 10.9% Hispanic; 4.9% Asian; 3.6% Two or more races; 3.1% Black; 0.9% other
- Occupation: 69.7% White-collar; 17.2% Blue-collar; 13.1% Gray-collar
- Cook PVI: D+11

Massachusetts's 6th congressional district is U.S. congressional district located in northeastern Massachusetts. It contains almost all of Essex County, including the North Shore and Cape Ann and includes parts of the Merrimack Valley, as well as some towns in Middlesex County. The New Republic has characterized the district as older and more suburban as a congressional district. "[T]he district is a far cry from the progressive urban strongholds of Boston and Cambridge. It’s an older, suburban, more middle-income district, which elected the decidedly moderate Moulton six times."

== Recent election results from statewide races ==
Year	Office	Results
2008	President	Obama 57% - 41%
2008	Senate	Kerry 63% - 37%
2010	Senate (Spec.)	Brown 59% - 41%
2010	Governor	Baker 50% - 41%
2012	President	Obama 55% - 45%
2012	Senate	Brown 54% - 46%
2014	Senate	Markey 58% - 42%
2014	Governor	Baker 55% - 41%
2016	President	Clinton 55% - 37%
2018	Senate	Warren 55% - 41%
2018	Governor	Baker 73% - 26%
2018	Secretary of the Commonwealth	Galvin 68% - 30%
2018	Attorney General	Healey 67% - 33%
2018	Treasurer and Receiver-General	Goldberg 65% - 32%
2018	Auditor	Bump 57% - 35%
2020	President	Biden 63% - 35%
2020	Senate	Markey 63% - 36%
2022	Governor	Healey 61% - 37%
2022	Secretary of the Commonwealth	Galvin 66% - 32%
2022	Attorney General	Campbell 60% - 40%
2022	Auditor	DiZoglio 53% - 41%
2024	President	Harris 59% - 38%
2024	Senate	Warren 57% - 43%

== Cities and towns in the district ==
For the 118th and successive Congresses (based on redistricting following the 2020 census), the district contains all or portions of two counties and 39 municipalities:

Essex County (31)

Amesbury, Andover, Beverly, Boxford, Danvers, Essex, Georgetown, Gloucester, Groveland, Hamilton, Ipswich, Lynn, Lynnfield, Manchester-by-the-Sea, Marblehead, Merrimac, Middleton, Nahant, Newbury, Newburyport, North Andover, Rockport, Peabody, Rowley, Salem, Salisbury, Saugus, Swampscott, Topsfield, Wenham, West Newbury

Middlesex County (8)

Bedford (part; also 5th), Billerica (part; also 3rd; includes Pinehurst), Burlington, North Reading, Reading, Tewksbury, Wakefield, Wilmington

== Cities and towns in the district prior to 2013 ==
=== 1840s ===
"Amherst, Belchertown, East Hampton, Enfield, Granby, Greenwich, Hadley, Hatfield, Northampton, Pelham, Prescott, South Hadley, and Ware, in the County of Hampshire; Brimfield, Holland, Longmeadow, Ludlow, Monson, Palmer, Southwick, Springfield, Wales, Westfield, West Springfield, and Wilbraham, in the County of Hampden; Bernardston, Deerfield, Erving, Gill, Greenfield, Leverett, Montague, New Salem, Northfield, Orange, Shutesbury, Sunderland, Warwick, Wendell, and Whately in the County of Franklin; and Athol and Royalston, in the County of Worcester."

=== 1850s ===
"The cities of Lynn, Newburyport, and Salem, and the towns of Amesbury, Beverly, Essex, Georgetown, Gloucester, Groveland, Hamilton, Ipswich, Manchester, Marblehead, Newbury, Rockport, Rowley, Salisbury, Wenham, and West Newbury, in the county of Essex."

=== 1890s ===
"Suffolk County: City of Boston, wards 3, 4, and 5, and the towns of Chelsea, Revere, and Winthrop. Middlesex County: Towns of Everett, Malden, Medford, Melrose, Reading, Stoneham, Wakefield, and Winchester. Essex County: Towns of Lynn, Nahant, Saugus, and Swampscott."

=== 1910s ===
"Essex County: Cities of Beverly, Gloucester, Haverhill, Newburyport, and Salem; towns of Amesbury, Essex, Georgetown, Groveland, Hamilton, Ipswich, Manchester, Marblehead, Merrimac, Newbury, Rockport, Rowley, Salisbury, Swampscott, Topsfleld, Wenham, and West Newbury."

=== 1990s ===
"Counties: Essex, Middlesex. Cities and townships: Amesbury, Bedford, Beverly, Boxford, Burlington, Danvers, Essex, Georgetown, Gloucester, Groveland, Hamilton, Haverhill, Ipswich, Lynn, Lynnfield, Manchester-by-the-Sea, Marblehead, Merrimac, Middleton, Nahant, Newbury, Newburyport, North Andover, North Reading, Peabody, Reading (part), Rockport, Rowley, Salem, Salisbury, Saugus, Swampscott, Topsfield, Wenham, West Newbury, and Wilmington."

=== 2003 to 2013 ===
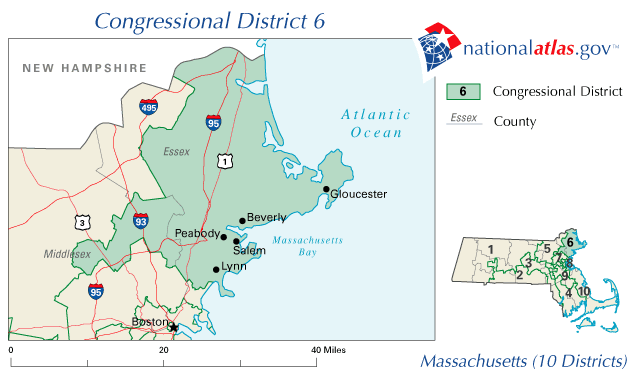
The district from 2003 to 2013

In Essex County:

The cities of: Amesbury, Beverly, Gloucester, Lynn, Newburyport, Peabody, and Salem
The towns of: Boxford, Danvers, Essex, Georgetown, Groveland, Hamilton, Ipswich, Lynnfield, Manchester-by-the-Sea, Marblehead, Merrimac, Middleton, Nahant, Newbury, North Andover, Rockport, Rowley, Salisbury, Saugus, Swampscott, Topsfield, Wenham, and West Newbury.

In Middlesex County:

The towns of: Bedford, Billerica, Burlington, North Reading, Reading, Wakefield and Wilmington.

== List of members representing the district ==
Member	Party	Years	Cong ress	Electoral history	District location
District created March 4, 1789
George Thatcher (Biddeford)	Pro-Administration	March 4, 1789 – March 3, 1791	1st	Elected in 1788. Redistricted to the 8th district.	1789–1793; Cumberland County and Lincoln County, District of Maine
George Leonard (Raynham)	Pro-Administration	March 4, 1791 – March 3, 1793	2nd	Redistricted from the 7th district and re-elected late in 1792. Lost re-election that same year.	1789–1793; Cumberland County and Lincoln County, District of Maine
District inactive		March 4, 1793 – March 3, 1795	3rd		1789–1793; Cumberland County and Lincoln County, District of Maine
John Reed Sr. (West Bridgewater)	Federalist	March 4, 1795 – March 3, 1801	4th 5th 6th	Elected in 1794. Re-elected in 1796. Re-elected in 1798. Retired.	1795–1803 "2nd Southern district"
Josiah Smith (Pembroke)	Democratic-Republican	March 4, 1801 – March 3, 1803	7th	Elected in 1800. Retired.	1795–1803 "2nd Southern district"
Samuel Taggart (Colrain)	Federalist	March 4, 1803 – March 3, 1817	8th 9th 10th 11th 12th 13th 14th	Elected in 1802. Re-elected in 1804. Re-elected in 1806. Re-elected in 1808. Re-elected in 1810. Re-elected in 1812. Re-elected in 1814. Retired.	1803–1823 "Hampshire North district"
Samuel C. Allen (Greenfield)	Federalist	March 4, 1817 – March 3, 1823	15th 16th 17th	Elected in 1816. Re-elected in 1818. Re-elected in 1820. Redistricted to the 7th district.	1803–1823 "Hampshire North district"
John Locke (Ashby)	Democratic-Republican	March 4, 1823 – March 3, 1825	18th 19th 20th	Elected in 1823 on the third ballot. Re-elected in 1824. Re-elected in 1826. Retired.	1823–1833 "Worcester North district"
John Locke (Ashby)	Anti-Jacksonian	March 4, 1825 – March 3, 1829	18th 19th 20th	Elected in 1823 on the third ballot. Re-elected in 1824. Re-elected in 1826. Retired.	1823–1833 "Worcester North district"
Joseph G. Kendall (Leominster)	Anti-Jackson	March 4, 1829 – March 3, 1833	21st 22nd	Elected in 1828. Re-elected in 1830. Retired.	1823–1833 "Worcester North district"
George Grennell Jr. (Greenfield)	Anti-Jackson	March 4, 1833 – March 3, 1837	23rd 24th 25th	Redistricted from the 7th district and re-elected in 1833. Re-elected in 1834. Re-elected in 1836. Retired.	1833–1843 [data missing]
George Grennell Jr. (Greenfield)	Whig	March 4, 1837 – March 3, 1839	23rd 24th 25th	Redistricted from the 7th district and re-elected in 1833. Re-elected in 1834. Re-elected in 1836. Retired.	1833–1843 [data missing]
James Alvord (Greenfield)	Whig	March 4, 1839 – September 27, 1839	26th	Elected in 1838. Died.	1833–1843 [data missing]
Vacant		September 27, 1839 – January 13, 1840	26th		1833–1843 [data missing]
Osmyn Baker (Amherst)	Whig	January 14, 1840 – March 3, 1845	26th 27th 28th	Elected to finish Alvord's term and seated January 14, 1840. Re-elected later in 1840. Re-elected in 1842. Retired.	1833–1843 [data missing]
Osmyn Baker (Amherst)	Whig	January 14, 1840 – March 3, 1845	26th 27th 28th	Elected to finish Alvord's term and seated January 14, 1840. Re-elected later in 1840. Re-elected in 1842. Retired.	1843–1853 [data missing]
George Ashmun (Springfield)	Whig	March 4, 1845 – March 3, 1851	29th 30th 31st	Elected in 1844. Re-elected in 1846. Re-elected in 1848. Retired.	1843–1853 [data missing]
George T. Davis (Greenfield)	Whig	March 4, 1851 – March 3, 1853	32nd	Elected in 1850. Retired.	1843–1853 [data missing]
Charles W. Upham (Salem)	Whig	March 4, 1853 – March 3, 1855	33rd	Elected in 1852. Lost re-election.	1853–1863 [data missing]
Timothy Davis (Gloucester)	Know Nothing	March 4, 1855 – March 3, 1857	34th 35th	Elected in 1854. Re-elected in 1856. [data missing]	1853–1863 [data missing]
Timothy Davis (Gloucester)	Republican	March 4, 1857 – March 3, 1859	34th 35th	Elected in 1854. Re-elected in 1856. [data missing]	1853–1863 [data missing]
John B. Alley (Lynn)	Republican	March 4, 1859 – March 3, 1863	36th 37th	Elected in 1858. Re-elected in 1860. Redistricted to the 5th district.	1853–1863 [data missing]
Daniel W. Gooch (Melrose)	Republican	March 4, 1863 – September 1, 1865	38th 39th	Redistricted from the 7th district and re-elected in 1862. Re-elected in 1864. Resigned to become Navy agent of the port of Boston.	1863–1873 [data missing]
Vacant		September 2, 1865 – December 3, 1865	39th		1863–1873 [data missing]
Nathaniel P. Banks (Waltham)	Republican	December 4, 1865 – March 3, 1873	39th 40th 41st 42nd	Elected to finish Gooch's term. Re-elected in 1866. Re-elected in 1868. Re-elected in 1870. Switched parties in 1872. Redistricted to the 5th district and lost re-election.	1863–1873 [data missing]
Nathaniel P. Banks (Waltham)	Liberal Republican	December 4, 1865 – March 3, 1873	39th 40th 41st 42nd	Elected to finish Gooch's term. Re-elected in 1866. Re-elected in 1868. Re-elected in 1870. Switched parties in 1872. Redistricted to the 5th district and lost re-election.	1863–1873 [data missing]
Benjamin F. Butler (Lowell)	Republican	March 4, 1873 – March 3, 1875	43rd	Redistricted from the 5th district and re-elected in 1872. Lost re-election.	1873–1883 [data missing]
Charles Perkins Thompson (Gloucester)	Democratic	March 4, 1875 – March 3, 1877	44th	Elected in 1874. Lost re-election.	1873–1883 [data missing]
George B. Loring(Salem)	Republican	March 4, 1877 – March 3, 1881	45th 46th	Elected in 1876. Re-elected in 1878. Lost renomination.	1873–1883 [data missing]
Eben F. Stone (Newburyport)	Republican	March 4, 1881 – March 3, 1883	47th	Elected in 1880. Retired.	1873–1883 [data missing]
Henry B. Lovering (Lynn)	Democratic	March 4, 1883 – March 3, 1887	48th 49th	Elected in 1882. Re-elected in 1884. Lost re-election.	1883–1893 [data missing]
Henry Cabot Lodge (Nahant)	Republican	March 4, 1887 – March 3, 1893	50th 51st 52nd	Elected in 1886. Re-elected in 1888. Re-elected in 1890. Redistricted to the 7th district.	1883–1893 [data missing]
William Cogswell (Salem)	Republican	March 4, 1893 – May 22, 1895	53rd 54th	Redistricted from the 7th district and re-elected in 1892. Re-elected in 1894. Died.	1893–1903 [data missing]
Vacant		May 22, 1895 – November 4, 1895	54th		1893–1903 [data missing]
William H. Moody (Haverhill)	Republican	November 5, 1895 – May 1, 1902	54th 55th 56th 57th	Elected to finish Cogswell's term. Re-elected in 1896. Re-elected in 1898. Re-elected in 1900. Resigned to become Secretary of the Navy	1893–1903 [data missing]
Vacant		May 2, 1902 – November 3, 1902	57th		1893–1903 [data missing]
Augustus P. Gardner (Hamilton)	Republican	November 4, 1902 – May 15, 1917	57th 58th 59th 60th 61st 62nd 63rd 64th 65th	Elected to finish Moody's term and re-elected to next term in 1902. Re-elected in 1904. Re-elected in 1906. Re-elected in 1908. Re-elected in 1910. Re-elected in 1912. Re-elected in 1914. Re-elected in 1916. Resigned to enter the army.	1893–1903 [data missing]
Augustus P. Gardner (Hamilton)	Republican	November 4, 1902 – May 15, 1917	57th 58th 59th 60th 61st 62nd 63rd 64th 65th	Elected to finish Moody's term and re-elected to next term in 1902. Re-elected in 1904. Re-elected in 1906. Re-elected in 1908. Re-elected in 1910. Re-elected in 1912. Re-elected in 1914. Re-elected in 1916. Resigned to enter the army.	1903–1913 [data missing]
Augustus P. Gardner (Hamilton)	Republican	November 4, 1902 – May 15, 1917	57th 58th 59th 60th 61st 62nd 63rd 64th 65th	Elected to finish Moody's term and re-elected to next term in 1902. Re-elected in 1904. Re-elected in 1906. Re-elected in 1908. Re-elected in 1910. Re-elected in 1912. Re-elected in 1914. Re-elected in 1916. Resigned to enter the army.	1913–1933 [data missing]
Vacant		May 15, 1917 – November 6, 1917	65th		1913–1933 [data missing]
Willfred W. Lufkin (Essex)	Republican	November 6, 1917 – June 30, 1921	65th 66th 67th	Elected to finish Gardner's term. Re-elected in 1918. Re-elected in 1920. Resigned to become Collector of Customs for the Port of Boston	1913–1933 [data missing]
Vacant		June 30, 1921 – September 27, 1921	67th		1913–1933 [data missing]
Abram Andrew (Gloucester)	Republican	September 27, 1921 – June 3, 1936	67th 68th 69th 70th 71st 72nd 73rd 74th	Elected to finish Lufkin's term. Re-elected in 1922. Re-elected in 1924. Re-elected in 1926. Re-elected in 1928. Re-elected in 1930. Re-elected in 1932. Re-elected in 1934. Died.	1913–1933 [data missing]
Abram Andrew (Gloucester)	Republican	September 27, 1921 – June 3, 1936	67th 68th 69th 70th 71st 72nd 73rd 74th	Elected to finish Lufkin's term. Re-elected in 1922. Re-elected in 1924. Re-elected in 1926. Re-elected in 1928. Re-elected in 1930. Re-elected in 1932. Re-elected in 1934. Died.	1933–1943 [data missing]
Vacant		June 3, 1936 – January 3, 1937	74th		1933–1943 [data missing]
George J. Bates (Salem)	Republican	January 3, 1937 – November 1, 1949	75th 76th 77th 78th 79th 80th 81st	Elected in 1936. Re-elected in 1938. Re-elected in 1940. Re-elected in 1942. Re-elected in 1944. Re-elected in 1946. Re-elected in 1948. Died in a plane crash.	1933–1943 [data missing]
George J. Bates (Salem)	Republican	January 3, 1937 – November 1, 1949	75th 76th 77th 78th 79th 80th 81st	Elected in 1936. Re-elected in 1938. Re-elected in 1940. Re-elected in 1942. Re-elected in 1944. Re-elected in 1946. Re-elected in 1948. Died in a plane crash.	1943–1953 [data missing]
Vacant		November 1, 1949 – February 14, 1950	81st		1943–1953 [data missing]
William H. Bates (Salem)	Republican	February 14, 1950 – June 22, 1969	81st 82nd 83rd 84th 85th 86th 87th 88th 89th 90th 91st	Elected to finish his father's term. Re-elected in 1950. Re-elected in 1952. Re-elected in 1954. Re-elected in 1956. Re-elected in 1958. Re-elected in 1960. Re-elected in 1962. Re-elected in 1964. Re-elected in 1966. Re-elected in 1968. Died.	1943–1953 [data missing]
William H. Bates (Salem)	Republican	February 14, 1950 – June 22, 1969	81st 82nd 83rd 84th 85th 86th 87th 88th 89th 90th 91st	Elected to finish his father's term. Re-elected in 1950. Re-elected in 1952. Re-elected in 1954. Re-elected in 1956. Re-elected in 1958. Re-elected in 1960. Re-elected in 1962. Re-elected in 1964. Re-elected in 1966. Re-elected in 1968. Died.	1953–1963 [data missing]
William H. Bates (Salem)	Republican	February 14, 1950 – June 22, 1969	81st 82nd 83rd 84th 85th 86th 87th 88th 89th 90th 91st	Elected to finish his father's term. Re-elected in 1950. Re-elected in 1952. Re-elected in 1954. Re-elected in 1956. Re-elected in 1958. Re-elected in 1960. Re-elected in 1962. Re-elected in 1964. Re-elected in 1966. Re-elected in 1968. Died.	1963–1973 [data missing]
Vacant		June 22, 1969 – September 30, 1969	91st		1963–1973 [data missing]
Michael J. Harrington (Beverly)	Democratic	September 30, 1969 – January 3, 1979	91st 92nd 93rd 94th 95th	Elected to finish Bates's term. Re-elected in 1970. Re-elected in 1972. Re-elected in 1974. Re-elected in 1976. Retired.	1963–1973 [data missing]
Michael J. Harrington (Beverly)	Democratic	September 30, 1969 – January 3, 1979	91st 92nd 93rd 94th 95th	Elected to finish Bates's term. Re-elected in 1970. Re-elected in 1972. Re-elected in 1974. Re-elected in 1976. Retired.	1973–1983 [data missing]
Nicholas Mavroules (Peabody)	Democratic	January 3, 1979 – January 3, 1993	96th 97th 98th 99th 100th 101st 102nd	Elected in 1978. Re-elected in 1980. Re-elected in 1982. Re-elected in 1984. Re-elected in 1986. Re-elected in 1988. Re-elected in 1990. Lost re-election.	1973–1983 [data missing]
Nicholas Mavroules (Peabody)	Democratic	January 3, 1979 – January 3, 1993	96th 97th 98th 99th 100th 101st 102nd	Elected in 1978. Re-elected in 1980. Re-elected in 1982. Re-elected in 1984. Re-elected in 1986. Re-elected in 1988. Re-elected in 1990. Lost re-election.	1983–1993 [data missing]
Peter G. Torkildsen (Danvers)	Republican	January 3, 1993 – January 3, 1997	103rd 104th	Elected in 1992. Re-elected in 1994. Lost re-election.	1993–2003 [data missing]
John F. Tierney (Salem)	Democratic	January 3, 1997 – January 3, 2015	105th 106th 107th 108th 109th 110th 111th 112th 113th	Elected in 1996. Re-elected in 1998. Re-elected in 2000. Re-elected in 2002. Re-elected in 2004. Re-elected in 2006. Re-elected in 2008. Re-elected in 2010. Re-elected in 2012. Lost renomination.	1993–2003 [data missing]
John F. Tierney (Salem)	Democratic	January 3, 1997 – January 3, 2015	105th 106th 107th 108th 109th 110th 111th 112th 113th	Elected in 1996. Re-elected in 1998. Re-elected in 2000. Re-elected in 2002. Re-elected in 2004. Re-elected in 2006. Re-elected in 2008. Re-elected in 2010. Re-elected in 2012. Lost renomination.	2003–2013 [data missing]
John F. Tierney (Salem)	Democratic	January 3, 1997 – January 3, 2015	105th 106th 107th 108th 109th 110th 111th 112th 113th	Elected in 1996. Re-elected in 1998. Re-elected in 2000. Re-elected in 2002. Re-elected in 2004. Re-elected in 2006. Re-elected in 2008. Re-elected in 2010. Re-elected in 2012. Lost renomination.	2013–2023
Seth Moulton (Salem)	Democratic	January 3, 2015 – present	114th 115th 116th 117th 118th 119th	Elected in 2014. Re-elected in 2016. Re-elected in 2018. Re-elected in 2020. Re-elected in 2022. Re-elected in 2024. Retired to run for U.S. Senate.	2013–2023
Seth Moulton (Salem)	Democratic	January 3, 2015 – present	114th 115th 116th 117th 118th 119th	Elected in 2014. Re-elected in 2016. Re-elected in 2018. Re-elected in 2020. Re-elected in 2022. Re-elected in 2024. Retired to run for U.S. Senate.	2023–present
Dan Koh (Andover)	Democratic	Assuming office on January 3, 2027		Elected in 2026.	

== Recent election results ==
The following are the results from the last four general elections for U.S. House of Representatives to represent the Massachusetts's 6th Congressional District:

Massachusetts's 6th congressional district election, 2012
Party	Candidate	Votes	%
Democratic	John F. Tierney (incumbent)	179,603	48.3%
Republican	Richard Tisei	175,953	47.3%
Libertarian	Daniel Fishman	16,668	4.4%
Total votes		372,224	100%
Democratic hold			

Massachusetts's 6th congressional district election, 2014
Party	Candidate	Votes	%
Democratic	Seth Moulton	149,449	54.7%
Republican	Richard Tisei	111,848	40.9%
Independent	Chris Stockwell	12,175	4.5%
Total votes		273,472	100%
Democratic hold			

Massachusetts's 6th congressional district election, 2016
Party	Candidate	Votes	%
Democratic	Seth Moulton (incumbent)	308,923	98.4%
No party	All Others	5,132	1.6%
Total votes		314,055	100%
Democratic hold			

Massachusetts's 6th congressional district election, 2018
Party	Candidate	Votes	%
Democratic	Seth Moulton (incumbent)	216,282	65.2%
Republican	Joseph Schneider	104,379	31.4%
Independent	Mary Jean Charbonneau	11,244	3.4%
Total votes		331,905	100%
Democratic hold			

Massachusetts's 6th congressional district election, 2020
Party	Candidate	Votes	%
Democratic	Seth Moulton (incumbent)	286,377	65.4%
Republican	John Paul Moran	150,695	34.4%
Write-in		605	0.2%
Total votes		437,677	100%
Democratic hold			

2024 Massachusetts's 6th congressional district election
Party	Candidate	Votes	%
Democratic	Seth Moulton (incumbent)	321,186	97.8
Write-in		7,191	2.2
Total votes		328,377	100.0
Democratic hold			
