= Massachusetts's 12th congressional district =

Former U.S. House district from 1795 to 1983

- Obsolete district
- Created: 1795; 1880
- Eliminated: 1840; 1980
- Years active: 1795–1843; 1883–1983

Massachusetts's current districts, since 2013

Massachusetts's 12th congressional district is an obsolete district that was first active 1795–1803 in the District of Maine and 1803–1843 in Eastern Massachusetts. It was later active 1883–1893 in Western Massachusetts and 1893–1983 in Eastern Massachusetts. It was most recently eliminated as a result of the redistricting cycle after the 1980 census. Its last congressman was Gerry Studds, who was redistricted into the 10th district.

Notable persons elected to the U.S. House of Representatives from the 12th congressional district include John Quincy Adams, following his term as president, and James Michael Curley, four-time Mayor of Boston.

== Cities and towns in the district ==
=== 1910s ===
Suffolk County: Boston Wards 13, 14, 15, 16, 17, 20, 24.

=== 1920s ===
Boston (Wards 9, 10, 11, 12, 17, 18, 19, 20, 21).

=== 1940s ===
Boston (Wards 6, 7, 8, 9, 11, 13, 14, 15, 16, 17).

== List of members representing the district ==
Representative (District home)	Party	Years	Cong ress	Electoral history	District location
District created March 4, 1795
Henry Dearborn (Gardiner)	Democratic-Republican	March 4, 1795 – March 3, 1797	4th	Redistricted from the 4th district and re-elected in 1795. Lost re-election.	1795–1803 "1st Eastern district," District of Maine
Isaac Parker (Castine)	Federalist	March 4, 1797 – March 3, 1799	5th	Elected in 1797 on the third ballot. Retired.	1795–1803 "1st Eastern district," District of Maine
Silas Lee (Wiscasset)	Federalist	March 4, 1799 – August 20, 1801	6th 7th	Elected in 1798. Re-elected in 1800. Resigned.	1795–1803 "1st Eastern district," District of Maine
Vacant		August 20, 1801 – December 6, 1802	7th		1795–1803 "1st Eastern district," District of Maine
Samuel Thatcher (Warren)	Federalist	December 6, 1802 – March 3, 1803	7th	Elected July 29, 1802 on the fifth ballot to finish Lee's term and seated December 6, 1802. Redistricted to the 16th district.	1795–1803 "1st Eastern district," District of Maine
Thomson J. Skinner (Williamstown)	Democratic-Republican	March 4, 1803 – August 10, 1804	8th	Elected in 1802. Resigned.	1803–1815 "Berkshire district"
Vacant		August 10, 1804 – November 5, 1804	8th		1803–1815 "Berkshire district"
Simon Larned (Pittsfield)	Democratic-Republican	November 5, 1804 – March 3, 1805	8th	Elected September 17, 1804 to finish Skinner's term and seated November 5, 1804. Retired.	1803–1815 "Berkshire district"
Barnabas Bidwell (Stockbridge)	Democratic-Republican	March 4, 1805 – July 13, 1807	9th 10th	Elected in 1804. Re-elected in 1806. Resigned to become Massachusetts Attorney General.	1803–1815 "Berkshire district"
Vacant		July 13, 1807 – November 2, 1807	10th		1803–1815 "Berkshire district"
Ezekiel Bacon (Pittsfield)	Democratic-Republican	November 2, 1807 – March 3, 1813	10th 11th 12th	Elected sometime in 1807 to finish Bidwell's term and seated November 2, 1807. Re-elected in 1808. Re-elected in 1810. Retired.	1803–1815 "Berkshire district"
Daniel Dewey (Williamstown)	Federalist	March 4, 1813 – February 24, 1814	13th	Elected in 1812. Resigned to become Justice of the Massachusetts Supreme Judicial Court.	1803–1815 "Berkshire district"
Vacant		February 24, 1814 – September 26, 1814	13th		1803–1815 "Berkshire district"
John W. Hulbert (Pittsfield)	Federalist	September 26, 1814 – March 3, 1815	13th	Elected August 4, 1814 to finish Dewey's term and seated September 26, 1814. Redistricted to the 7th district.	1803–1815 "Berkshire district"
Solomon Strong (Westminster)	Federalist	March 4, 1815 – March 3, 1819	14th 15th	Elected in 1814. Re-elected in 1816. Retired.	1815–1823 "Worcester North district"
Jonas Kendall (Leominster)	Federalist	March 4, 1819 – March 3, 1821	16th	Elected in 1818. Lost re-election.	1815–1823 "Worcester North district"
Lewis Bigelow (Petersham)	Federalist	March 4, 1821 – March 3, 1823	17th	Elected in 1820. Lost re-election.	1815–1823 "Worcester North district"
Francis Baylies (Taunton)	Jackson; Federalist	March 4, 1823 – March 3, 1825	18th 19th	Redistricted from the 10th district and re-elected in 1822. Re-elected in 1825 on the second ballot. Lost re-election.	1823–1833 "Bristol district"
Francis Baylies (Taunton)	Jacksonian	March 4, 1825 – March 3, 1827	18th 19th	Redistricted from the 10th district and re-elected in 1822. Re-elected in 1825 on the second ballot. Lost re-election.	1823–1833 "Bristol district"
James L. Hodges (Taunton)	Anti-Jacksonian	March 4, 1827 – March 3, 1833	20th 21st 22nd	Elected in 1827 on the third ballot. Re-elected in 1828. Re-elected in 1832. Retired.	1823–1833 "Bristol district"
John Quincy Adams (Quincy)	Anti-Masonic	March 4, 1833 – March 3, 1837	23rd 24th 25th 26th 27th	Redistricted from the 11th district and re-elected in 1833. Re-elected in 1834. Re-elected in 1836. Re-elected in 1838. Re-elected in 1840. Redistricted to the 8th district.	1833–1843 [data missing]
John Quincy Adams (Quincy)	Whig	March 4, 1837 – March 3, 1843	23rd 24th 25th 26th 27th	Redistricted from the 11th district and re-elected in 1833. Re-elected in 1834. Re-elected in 1836. Re-elected in 1838. Re-elected in 1840. Redistricted to the 8th district.	1833–1843 [data missing]
District eliminated March 3, 1843
District re-created March 4, 1883
George D. Robinson (Chicopee)	Republican	March 4, 1883 – January 7, 1884	48th	Redistricted from the 11th district and re-elected in 1882. Resigned to become Governor of Massachusetts.	1883–1893 [data missing]
Vacant		January 7, 1884 – January 17, 1884	48th		1883–1893 [data missing]
Francis W. Rockwell (Pittsfield)	Republican	January 17, 1884 – March 3, 1891	48th 49th 50th 51st	Elected to finish Robinson's term Re-elected in 1884. Re-elected in 1886. Re-elected in 1888. Lost re-election.	1883–1893 [data missing]
John C. Crosby (Pittsfield)	Democratic	March 4, 1891 – March 3, 1893	52nd	Elected in 1890. Lost re-election.	1883–1893 [data missing]
Elijah A. Morse (Canton)	Republican	March 4, 1893 – March 3, 1897	53rd 54th	Redistricted from the 2nd district and re-elected in 1892. Re-elected in 1894. Retired.	1893–1903 [data missing]
William C. Lovering (Taunton)	Republican	March 4, 1897 – March 3, 1903	55th 56th 57th	Elected in 1896. Re-elected in 1898. Re-elected in 1900. Redistricted to the 14th district.	1893–1903 [data missing]
Samuel Leland Powers (Newton)	Republican	March 4, 1903 – March 3, 1905	58th	Redistricted from the 11th district and re-elected in 1902. Retired.	1903–1913 [data missing]
John W. Weeks (Newton)	Republican	March 4, 1905 – March 3, 1913	59th 60th 61st 62nd	Elected in 1904. Re-elected in 1906. Re-elected in 1908. Re-elected in 1910. Redistricted to the 13th district.	1903–1913 [data missing]
James Michael Curley (Boston)	Democratic	March 4, 1913 – February 4, 1914	63rd	Redistricted from the 10th district and re-elected in 1912. Resigned to become Mayor of Boston.	1913–1933 [data missing]
Vacant		February 4, 1914 – April 7, 1914	63rd		1913–1933 [data missing]
James A. Gallivan (Boston)	Democratic	April 7, 1914 – April 3, 1928	63rd 64th 65th 66th 67th 68th 69th 70th	Elected to finish Curley's term. Re-elected in 1914. Re-elected in 1916. Re-elected in 1918. Re-elected in 1920. Re-elected in 1922. Re-elected in 1924. Re-elected in 1926. Died.	1913–1933 [data missing]
Vacant		April 3, 1928 – November 6, 1928	70th		1913–1933 [data missing]
John W. McCormack (Boston)	Democratic	November 6, 1928 – January 3, 1963	70th 71st 72nd 73rd 74th 75th 76th 77th 78th 79th 80th 81st 82nd 83rd 84th 85th 86th 87th	Elected to finish Gallivan's term. Re-elected in 1928. Re-elected in 1930. Re-elected in 1932. Re-elected in 1934. Re-elected in 1936. Re-elected in 1938. Re-elected in 1940. Re-elected in 1942. Re-elected in 1944. Re-elected in 1946. Re-elected in 1948. Re-elected in 1950. Re-elected in 1952. Re-elected in 1954. Re-elected in 1956. Re-elected in 1958. Re-elected in 1960. Redistricted to the 9th district.	1913–1933 [data missing]
John W. McCormack (Boston)	Democratic	November 6, 1928 – January 3, 1963	70th 71st 72nd 73rd 74th 75th 76th 77th 78th 79th 80th 81st 82nd 83rd 84th 85th 86th 87th	Elected to finish Gallivan's term. Re-elected in 1928. Re-elected in 1930. Re-elected in 1932. Re-elected in 1934. Re-elected in 1936. Re-elected in 1938. Re-elected in 1940. Re-elected in 1942. Re-elected in 1944. Re-elected in 1946. Re-elected in 1948. Re-elected in 1950. Re-elected in 1952. Re-elected in 1954. Re-elected in 1956. Re-elected in 1958. Re-elected in 1960. Redistricted to the 9th district.	1933–1943 [data missing]
John W. McCormack (Boston)	Democratic	November 6, 1928 – January 3, 1963	70th 71st 72nd 73rd 74th 75th 76th 77th 78th 79th 80th 81st 82nd 83rd 84th 85th 86th 87th	Elected to finish Gallivan's term. Re-elected in 1928. Re-elected in 1930. Re-elected in 1932. Re-elected in 1934. Re-elected in 1936. Re-elected in 1938. Re-elected in 1940. Re-elected in 1942. Re-elected in 1944. Re-elected in 1946. Re-elected in 1948. Re-elected in 1950. Re-elected in 1952. Re-elected in 1954. Re-elected in 1956. Re-elected in 1958. Re-elected in 1960. Redistricted to the 9th district.	1943–1953 [data missing]
John W. McCormack (Boston)	Democratic	November 6, 1928 – January 3, 1963	70th 71st 72nd 73rd 74th 75th 76th 77th 78th 79th 80th 81st 82nd 83rd 84th 85th 86th 87th	Elected to finish Gallivan's term. Re-elected in 1928. Re-elected in 1930. Re-elected in 1932. Re-elected in 1934. Re-elected in 1936. Re-elected in 1938. Re-elected in 1940. Re-elected in 1942. Re-elected in 1944. Re-elected in 1946. Re-elected in 1948. Re-elected in 1950. Re-elected in 1952. Re-elected in 1954. Re-elected in 1956. Re-elected in 1958. Re-elected in 1960. Redistricted to the 9th district.	1953–1963 [data missing]
Hastings Keith (West Bridgewater)	Republican	January 3, 1963 – January 3, 1973	88th 89th 90th 91st 92nd	Redistricted from the 9th district and re-elected in 1962. Re-elected in 1964. Re-elected in 1966. Re-elected in 1968. Re-elected in 1970. [data missing]	1963–1973 [data missing]
Gerry Studds (Cohasset)	Democratic	January 3, 1973 – January 3, 1983	93rd 94th 95th 96th 97th	Elected in 1972; Re-elected in 1974. Re-elected in 1976. Re-elected in 1978. Re-elected in 1980. Redistricted to the 10th district.	1973–1983 [data missing]
District eliminated January 3, 1983

== Notes ==
U.S. House of Representatives
Preceded by Texas's 4th congressional district	Home district of the speaker of the House; January 10, 1962 – January 3, 1963	Succeeded by Massachusetts's 9th congressional district
