= Dew (surname) =

Dew is a surname. Notable people with the surname include:

- Aisha Dew, American politician
- Albert George Dew-Smith (né Dew; 1848–1903), English scientist and photographer
- Sir Armine Dew (1867–1941), British soldier and colonial administrator
- Carrie Dew (born 1986), American footballer
- Charles B. Dew (born 1944), American historian
- Diana Dew (1943–2008), American fashion designer
- Earl Dew (1921–1941), American champion jockey
- Eddie Dew (1909–1972), American actor, film director, and television director
- Gavin Dew (born 1984), Canadian politician
- George Dew (1666–1703), Caribbean pirate
- George Dew (politician) (1853/1854–1931), British politician
- John Dew (cricketer) (1920–2008), English cricketer
- John Dew (cardinal) (born 1948), Roman Catholic Archbishop of Wellington and metropolitan of New Zealand
- John Dew (director) (born 1944), British opera director
- Josie Dew (born 1966), English cyclist & author
- Marianne Dew (1938–2013), English sprinter
- Martin Dew (fl. 1982–1987), English badminton player
- Mountain Dew American soft drink.
- Natalie Dew (born 1987), English actress
- Robb Forman Dew (1946–2020), American author
- Sam Dew, American musician
- Sheri L. Dew (born 1953), American Mormon speaker & writer
- Stuart Dew (born 1979), Australian rules footballer
- Susan Dew Hoff (1842–1933), American physician
- Thomas Dew (politician) (died c. 1691), Virginia colonial politician
- Thomas Roderick Dew (1802–1846), American educator & writer
- Walter Dew (1863–1947), English police detective

== See also ==
- Dew (disambiguation)
- Dewes, for people with the name
- Dews, for people with the name
- Colleen Dewe (1930–1993), New Zealand politician
