= Pro-slavery ideology in the United States =

Prevailing view in the Southern US prior to the American Civil War

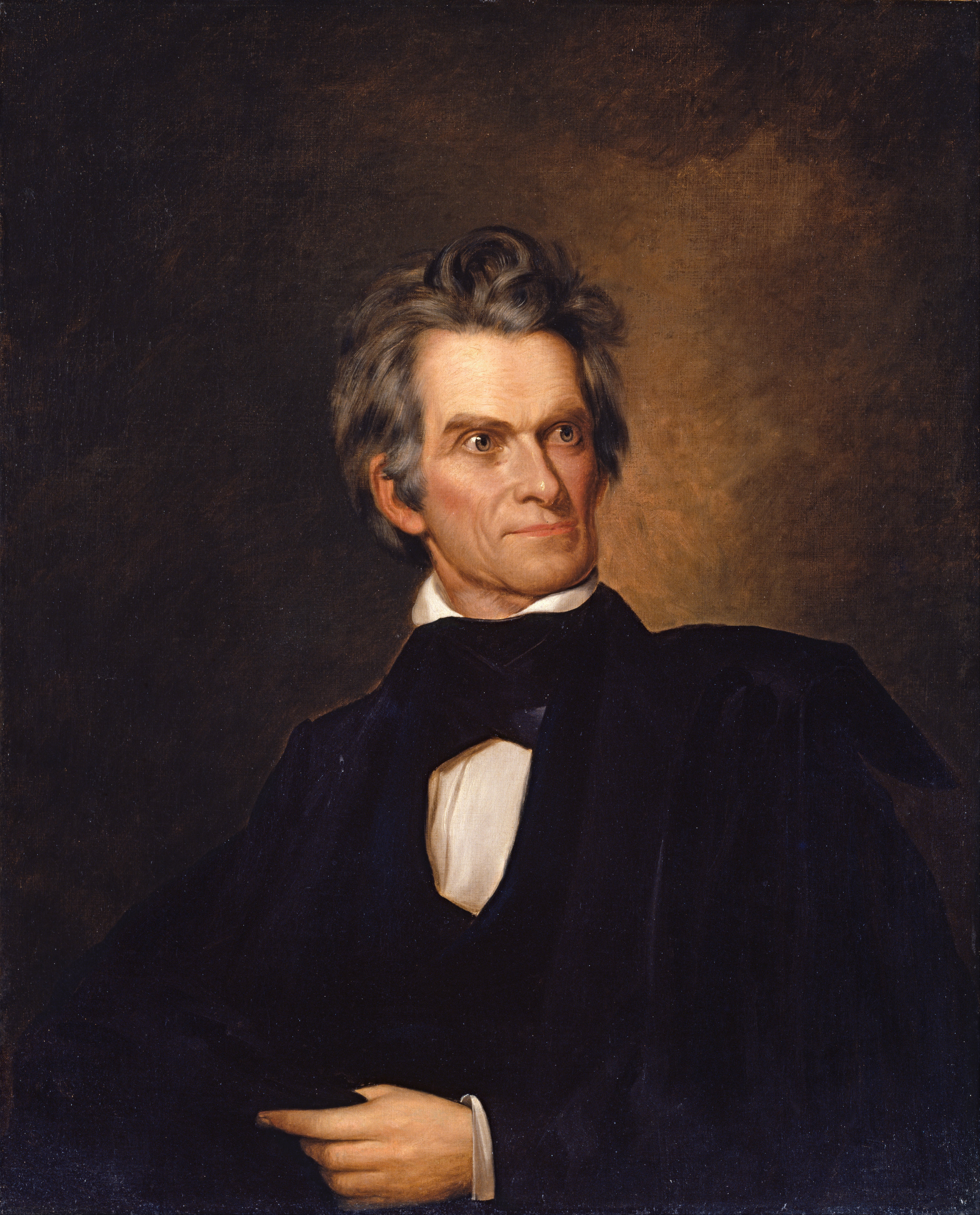
American statesman John C. Calhoun was one of the most prominent advocates of the "slavery as a positive good" viewpoint.

The prevailing view of Southern politicians and intellectuals just before the American Civil War was that slavery was a positive institution, as opposed to seeing it as morally indefensible or a necessary evil. They defended the legal enslavement of people for their labor as a benevolent, paternalistic institution with social and economic benefits, an important bulwark of civilization, and a divine institution similar or superior to the free labor in the North.

This stance arose in response to the growing anti-slavery movement in the United States in the late 18th century and early 19th century. Various forms of slavery had been practiced across the world for all of human history, but during the American Revolution, slavery became a significant social issue in North America. At this time, the anti-slavery contention that it was both economically inefficient and socially detrimental to the country as a whole was more prevalent than philosophical and moral arguments against slavery. However this perspective rapidly changed as the worldwide demand for sugar and cotton from America increased and the Louisiana Purchase opened up vast new territories ideally suited for a plantation economy.

By the early 19th century, anti-slavery arguments began to depart from claims that it was economically inefficient and towards the contention that slavery was inherently immoral. In response, pro-slavery advocates fought against the abolitionists with their own morality-based defense, which invariably stressed their view that slaves were both well treated and happy, and included illustrations which were designed to prove their points. A writer in 1835 asserted that American slavery is the best slavery there ever was:

[W]e ... deny that slavery is sinful or inexpedient. We deny that it is wrong in the abstract. We assert that it is the natural condition of man; that there ever has been, and there ever will be slavery; and we not only claim for ourselves the right to determine for ourselves the relations between master and slave, but we insist that the slavery of the Southern States is the best regulation of slavery, whether we take into consideration the interests of the master or of the slave, that has ever been devised.

== The "positive good" defense of slavery ==
Characterizing American perceptions of slavery at the turn of the 18th and 19th centuries in the 1998 documentary series Africans in America: America's Journey Through Slavery, the historian Douglas R. Egerton said:

The planter class in the Age of Revolution never believed for a moment the blacks were happy in their condition and wouldn't try for freedom, the way that white planters in the 1830s and '40s tried to convince themselves that their slaves loved their situation. Americans who lived through the American Revolution understood that this was a violent world and that slaves were held in place only by white military power.

A narrative that enslaved Africans lived in a carefree, comfortable state dates back to the late eighteenth century. This argument mostly focused on the economic feasibility of enslaving people for their labor despite the inherent subjugation and degradation of human beings. The enslaved people of the time were members of what historian Ira Berlin called the revolutionary generations and in his pivotal 1998 work Many Thousands Gone he described the transition in popular sentiments about the Africans and their descendants among ethnically European settlers of North America as,

If in the sixteenth and seventeenth centuries transplanted Europeans denounced Atlantic creoles as audacious rogues and if in the eighteenth century the nascent planter class condemned the newly arrived Africans for their "gross bestiality and rudeness of their manners", nineteenth-century white Americans redefined blackness by endowing it with a new hard edge and confining people of African descent to a place of permanent inferiority.

But by the 1810s a new rationale arose that began to treat legalized enslavement as a "positive good" and not as an economically "necessary evil", while still affirming its alleged economic benefits. It appears that this new premise was first expressed by Robert Walsh in 1819:

The physical condition of the American Negro is on the whole, not comparatively alone, but positively good, and he is exempt from those racking anxieties—the exacerbates of despair, to which the English manufacturer and peasant are subject to in the pursuit of their pittance.

Such justification about the "goodness" of enslavement for those who were enslaved became more common in the 1820s. By the late 1820s, the defense of institutional slavery saw it as mutually beneficial for state governments, enslavers, and enslaved people alike. Legal enslavement drifted from being seen as an economic system of private enslavers to a political and philosophical position that portrayed enslavement as possessing national importance, providing benefits to the states, including more tax revenue.

A well-known example of this new pro-enslavement approach was voiced by Governor Stephen D. Miller in his 1829 speech to South Carolina's legislators:

Slavery is not a national evil; on the contrary, it is a national benefit. The agricultural wealth of the country is found in those states owning slaves, and a great portion of the revenue of the government is derived from the products of slave labor—Slavery exists in some form everywhere, and it is not of much consequence in a philosophical point of view, whether it be voluntary or involuntary. In a political point of view, involuntary slavery had the advantage, since all who enjoy political liberty are then, in fact, free.

Not long after Governor Miller's speech, the general defense of involuntary servitude drifted towards a position where a "proper social order and foundation of social welfare played a major role" in the pro-enslavement debate.

Another economic defense of slave labor came from economist Thomas Roderick Dew, professor at and then president of the College of William and Mary, who downplayed the evil of owning humans after the Virginia House of Burgesses almost passed legislation for the emancipation of enslaved people in 1832. Dew supported enslavement on philosophical, economic and Biblical grounds, arguing that chattel slavery was not necessarily an immoral system. In portraying Southern enslavement-based society as "superior" to Northern free society, Dew's pro-slavery argument turned into a "positive good" defense.

== James Henry Hammond and the mudsill theory ==
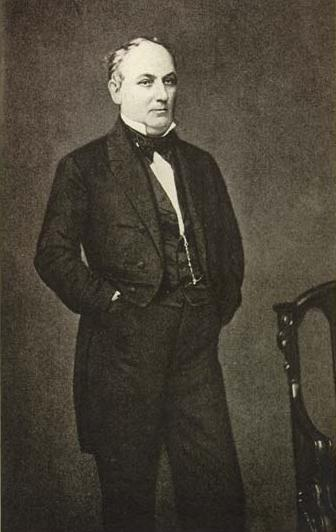
James Henry Hammond

On February 1, 1836, Congressman James Henry Hammond from South Carolina spoke on the House floor for two hours about the perceived menace of abolitionism. He launched an attack on pro-human rights proponents in the North, while defending the social and economic benefits to whites of enslavement in the South. Hammond's speech on enslavement was considered a new departure in the American Congress, distinguished as the "first explicit defense of slavery as a positive good".

In that 1836 speech, Hammond attempted to justify the practice:

Slavery is said to be an evil .... But it is no evil. On the contrary, I believe it to be the greatest of all the great blessings which a kind Providence has bestowed upon our glorious region .... As a class, I say it boldly; there is not a happier, more contented race upon the face of the earth. I have been born and brought up in the midst of them, and so far as my knowledge and experience extend, I should say they have every reason to be happy. Lightly tasked, well clothed, well fed—far better than the free laborers of any country in the world ...—their lives and persons protected by the law, all their sufferings alleviated by the kindest and most interested care ....

Sir, I do firmly believe that domestic slavery regulated as ours is produces the highest toned, the purest, best organization of society that has ever existed on the face of the earth.

A Democrat, Hammond was elected Governor of South Carolina in 1842. He was best known during his lifetime as an outspoken defender of the South and the institution of slavery.

After traveling through Europe, Hammond concluded that free laborers were being exploited by soulless materialism in England and the North, where workers had the "liberty only to starve", while Southerners were far more protective, assuming "responsibility for every aspect of the lives" of their slaves.

Hammond co-authored The Pro-Slavery Argument with William Harper, Thomas Roderick Dew, and William Gilmore Simms, who composed part of the "sacred circle" of proslavery intellectuals.

In his famous Mudsill Speech (1858), Hammond articulated the pro-slavery political argument during the period at which the ideology was at its most mature (late 1830s – early 1860s). Along with John C. Calhoun, Hammond believed that the bane of many past societies was the existence of the class of the landless poor. This class of landless poor was viewed as being inherently transient and easily manipulated, and as such often destabilized society as a whole. Thus, the greatest threat to democracy was seen as coming from class warfare that destabilized a nation's economy, society, government, and threatened the peaceful and harmonious implementation of laws.

This theory supposes that there must be, and supposedly always has been, a lower class for the upper classes to rest upon: the metaphor of a mudsill theory being that the lowest threshold (mudsill) supports the foundation for a building. The theory was used by Hammond to justify what he saw as the willingness of the non-whites to perform menial work which enabled the higher classes to move civilization forward. With this in mind, any efforts for class or racial equality that ran counter to the theory would inevitably run counter to civilization itself.

Southern pro-slavery theorists asserted that slavery eliminated this problem by elevating all free people to the status of "citizen", and removing the landless poor (the "mudsill") from the political process entirely by means of enslavement. Thus, those who would most threaten economic stability and political harmony were not allowed to undermine a democratic society, because they were not allowed to participate in it. So, in the mindset of those in favor of it, slavery was for protecting the common good of slaves, masters, and society as a whole.

== John C. Calhoun and "positive good" slavery ==
John C. Calhoun, a political theorist and the seventh Vice President of the United States advocated for the idea of "positive good" slavery. Calhoun was a leader of the Democratic-Republican Party in the early nineteenth century who, in the Second Party System, initially joined the proslavery Nullifier Party but left by 1839. Though having refused to attend the inauguration of Democratic president Martin Van Buren two years before, Calhoun voted with the Democratic Party for the remainder of his career. To Calhoun, slavery was a great benefit for an inferior race that had no ability to exercise their freedom positively. Calhoun argued:

Never before has the black race of Central Africa, from the dawn of history to the present day, attained a condition so civilized and so improved, not only physically, but morally and intellectually .... It came to us in a low, degraded, and savage condition, and in the course of a few generations it has grown up under the fostering care of our institutions.

The concept of slavery as a positive good came to the forefront in Calhoun's February 6, 1837, speech on the US Senate floor. In an attempt to disarm the abolitionists' moral outrage over slavery as "man-stealing" and ignoring the anti-slavery tradition of the Founders, Calhoun, like many proslavery Southerners, pointed to the ancient world to help them defend the institution of slavery, especially Aristotle's theory of natural slavery. Greek democracy along with the grandeur of the Roman republic provided Southerners with a perspective that great cultures and slavery were inseparable.

Attempting to claim the moral mantle for the social defense of involuntary servitude, Calhoun declared:

But I take higher ground. I hold that, in the present state of civilization, where two races of different origin, and distinguished by colour, and other physical differences, as well as intellectual, are brought together, the relation now existing in the slaveholding states between the two is, instead of an evil, a good – a positive good. I feel myself called upon to speak freely upon the subject, where the honour and interests of those I represent are involved.

In that 1837 speech, Calhoun further argued that the slaveholders took care of their slaves from birth to old age, urging the opponents of slavery to "look at the sick, and the old and infirm slave, on one hand, in the midst of his family and friends, under the kind superintending care of his master and mistress, and compare it with the forlorn and wretched condition of the pauper in the poor house" found in Europe and the Northern states.

Such an assertion was predicated on the virtues of benevolent paternalism, the glory of past civilizations, and the traditions of white supremacy. In an effort to illustrate that the North was also guilty of treating and exploiting its free laborers like slaves, Calhoun declared in his speech "that there never has yet existed a wealthy and civilised society in which one portion of the community did not ... live on the labour of the other."

Most Southern slaveholders and intellectuals favored Calhoun's ideas and maintained that the institution of slavery "benefited both master and servant". In that arrangement, the slaveholder acquired his labor and the slave was given a standard of living far beyond what he could ever hope to achieve on his own.

Calhoun sought to defend slavery as a positive good, and expanded his argument to condemn the North and industrial capitalism, asserting that slavery was "actually superior to the 'wage slavery' of the North". He believed that free laborers in the North were just as enslaved as the Negro workers in the South. However, in the case of slaves in the South, Calhoun argued that Negros were receiving special protection under a caring and paternalistic master, and therefore were more fortunate.

In his manifesto A Disquisition on Government, Calhoun opposed the "equality upon birth" assertion that the Founders declared in the Declaration of Independence, arguing that not all people are "equally entitled to liberty". To bolster the prospects of slavery, he asserted that liberty was not a universal right but should be "reserved for the intelligent, the patriotic, the virtuous and deserving", which would exclude both free and enslaved Negros. Moreover, in 1820, Calhoun explained to John Quincy Adams that slave labor was the mechanics by which to maintain social control, calling it the "best guarantee for equality among whites".

== Effects of the "positive good" argument for slavery ==
Before the 1830s, the support for slavery was weakening in the South. During this period many Southerners agreed that, in the abstract, slavery constituted an evil. They claimed that they had not participated in its introduction, and laid the blame of the existence of the institution on "old Grandam Britain". Nonetheless, few Southerners were willing to also call slavery "a sin". This attitude resulted in a situation where "slave states contained a great many more anti-slavery societies than the free states". After the abolitionists escalated their intellectual attacks against slavery, pro-slavery Southerners felt threatened, and retaliated with their own philosophical and morality-based justifications to defend involuntary servitude. The pro-slavery adherents felt compelled to take a hardline stance and engaged in a vehement and growing ideological defense of slavery. Pro-slavery intellectuals and slaveholders began to rationalize slavery as a positive good that benefited both owners and the enslaved. Calhoun believed that the "ownership of Negros" was both a right and an obligation, causing the pro-slavery intelligentsia to position enslavement as a paternalistic and socially beneficial relationship, that required reciprocal "duties" from the enslaved.

Another aspect of "slavery as a positive good" motivated some Southern white women to offer the enslaved on plantations material goods, as well as maternal care of those they considered "unfit or feeble-minded Negros". However, all black people were generally, though not universally, believed to be an inherently inferior "race", the schooling of whom would be a waste, as they could not be educated. Some plantation mistresses spent considerable time in an attempt to "civilize" their enslaved laborers by providing food, shelter, and affection. In this sense, antebellum Southern women saw the enslaved as childlike, in need of protection. While engaging in this type of activity, they also attempted to convince the plantation enslaved, who were denied contact with the many abolitionist newspapers, that their condition was far better than those of the white or black factory workers in the industrial North.

== George Fitzhugh's extreme defense of slavery ==
George Fitzhugh was a slave owner, a prominent pro-slavery Democrat, and a sociological theorist who took the positive-good argument to its final extreme conclusion. Fitzhugh argued that slavery was the proper relationship of all labor to capital, that it was generally better for all laborers to be enslaved rather than free. He insisted that slavery was not a question of race, that in principle anyone of any race could be enslaved, and that this was beneficial to those enslaved as well as to their masters. Fitzhugh argued that Southern slaves had a "guarantee of livelihood, protection and support", and that if a master failed to perform his duties, he could be forced to sell his slaves to a more capable slaveholder. In this way, Fitzhugh contended that "Slavery protects the infants, the aged and the sick," along with the healthy and the strong.

Fitzhugh declared that "the unrestricted exploitation of so-called free society is more oppressive to the laborer than domestic slavery". In later years, Fitzhugh not only supported slavery for blacks, but like other proslavery intellectuals, came to the conclusion that it was also suitable for whites, if considered unfit. He believed that whites, if trained well and domesticated, could be as "faithful and valuable servants" as blacks.

Taking an authoritarian position, Fitzhugh argued that "All government is slavery", and that "No one ought to be free." And yet he, like other proslavery theorists, believed that "slavery ultimately made democracy work", by referencing the history of Classical Athens, the Roman Republic, and other ancient societies with democratic characteristics, all of which had slavery. Fitzhugh summed up his pro-slavery stance with the following argument:

"It is the duty of society to protect the weak;" but protection cannot be efficient without the power of control; therefore, "It is the duty of society to enslave the weak."

Fitzhugh's views were influential and widely acknowledged in the South. The Richmond Enquirer found Fitzhugh's pro-slavery sentiments to be sound, declaring that the justification of slavery was not an issue of "mere negro slavery", but that in of itself "slavery is a right, natural and necessary." Fitzhugh maintained that slavery was the best institution to ensure "the rights of man".

== The Southern Democrats' role in reshaping the issue of slavery ==
Founded in 1828, the Southern Democrats' success and prominence across the political landscape has been attributed to its ability to reshape the issue of slavery as a "morally beneficial institution", especially to the more radical faction of Southerners within the Democratic Party. By the mid-19th century, the Democrats of the Second and Third Party Systems had become not only the most ardent defenders of slavery, but the most important institutional supporters of slavery.

Andrew Jackson, who owned throughout his life up to 300 slaves, was the first U.S. President (1829–1837) to be elected from the newly founded Democratic Party. Jackson was accused of beating his slaves, and also of banning the delivery of anti-slavery literature through the mail, calling abolitionists monsters who should "atone for this wicked attempt with their lives".

In the Democratic South, many pro-slavery activists within the Southern intelligentsia and political community took the position that they were simply "upholding the great principles which our fathers bequeathed us". They regarded the practice of holding other humans in chattel bondage as a "constitutional freedom" that was enshrined in the U.S. Constitution.

By 1860, the Democratic Party was seen as "irrevocably wedded to the institution of Slavery ... hand and heart". As the Southern armies began suffering defeats in the battlefield, the New York Times opined that the Southern Democrats' devotion to slavery held a "stubbornness of fond infatuation such as the world has seldom seen".

== See also ==
- Anti-Tom literature and Confederate literature
- Fire-Eaters
- Movement to reopen the transatlantic slave trade
- Proslavery thought
- Tom Cotton's statements about slavery
- Knights of the Golden Circle
