= Portrait of John C. Calhoun =

Painting by Henry F. Darby

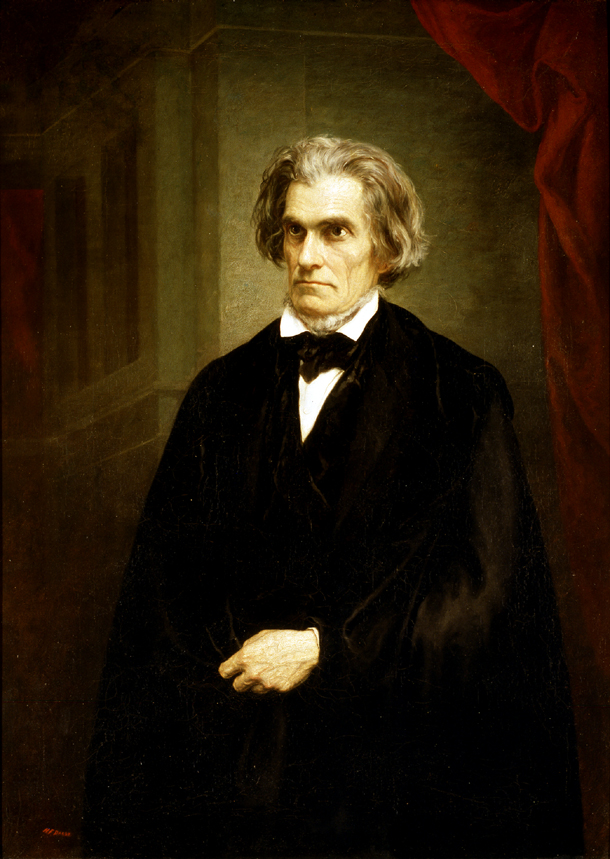
- Year: c. 1858
- Medium: oil paint, canvas
- Dimensions: 126.4 cm (49.8 in) × 90.5 cm (35.6 in)
- Accession: 32.00003.000

Portrait of John C. Calhoun is a circa 1858 oil on canvas portrait painting by Henry F. Darby, now in United States Capitol in Washington, D.C.

The painting portrays John C. Calhoun, who sat for his photograph in Mathew Brady's studio the year before he died in 1850. This portrait has the inscription on the back ”Calhoun / from Life by Darby / H. F. Darby / 1858”, though the "from Life" must refer to the daguerreotype. Though the photograph was commissioned by Calhoun's daughter Florence Clemson, who accompanied her father to the studio, the painting was commissioned by Brady who considered it one of his prize paintings in his studio. He probably used it to sell both copies of the photograph and as a painted portrait option based on a single sitting. It was purchased from him for the Capitol collection in 1881. Brady said that Henry Darby had made a study for the painting during the sitting for the daguerreotype, but the Senate collection now claims Darby and Brady teamed up by using glass negative copies of the daguerreotypes to project the image onto "sensitized canvas", which could then be over-painted, a reproduction process that didn't need the artist's presence at the sitting. At the time the painting was made, Darby and Brady both had addresses on the same block of Pennsylvania Avenue in Washington, D.C.

The portrait hangs across from the portrait of Charles Sumner, also based on a Brady photograph. Calhoun is known for his views on slavery as a positive good in the United States, in contrast to his portrait's abolitionist neighbor. In his Senate address of 6 February 1837, Calhoun says "a large portion of the Northern States believed slavery to be a sin" and warns that "this fanatical portion of society ... would begin their operations on the ignorant, the weak, the young, and the thoughtless – and gradually extend upwards till they would become strong enough to obtain political control".

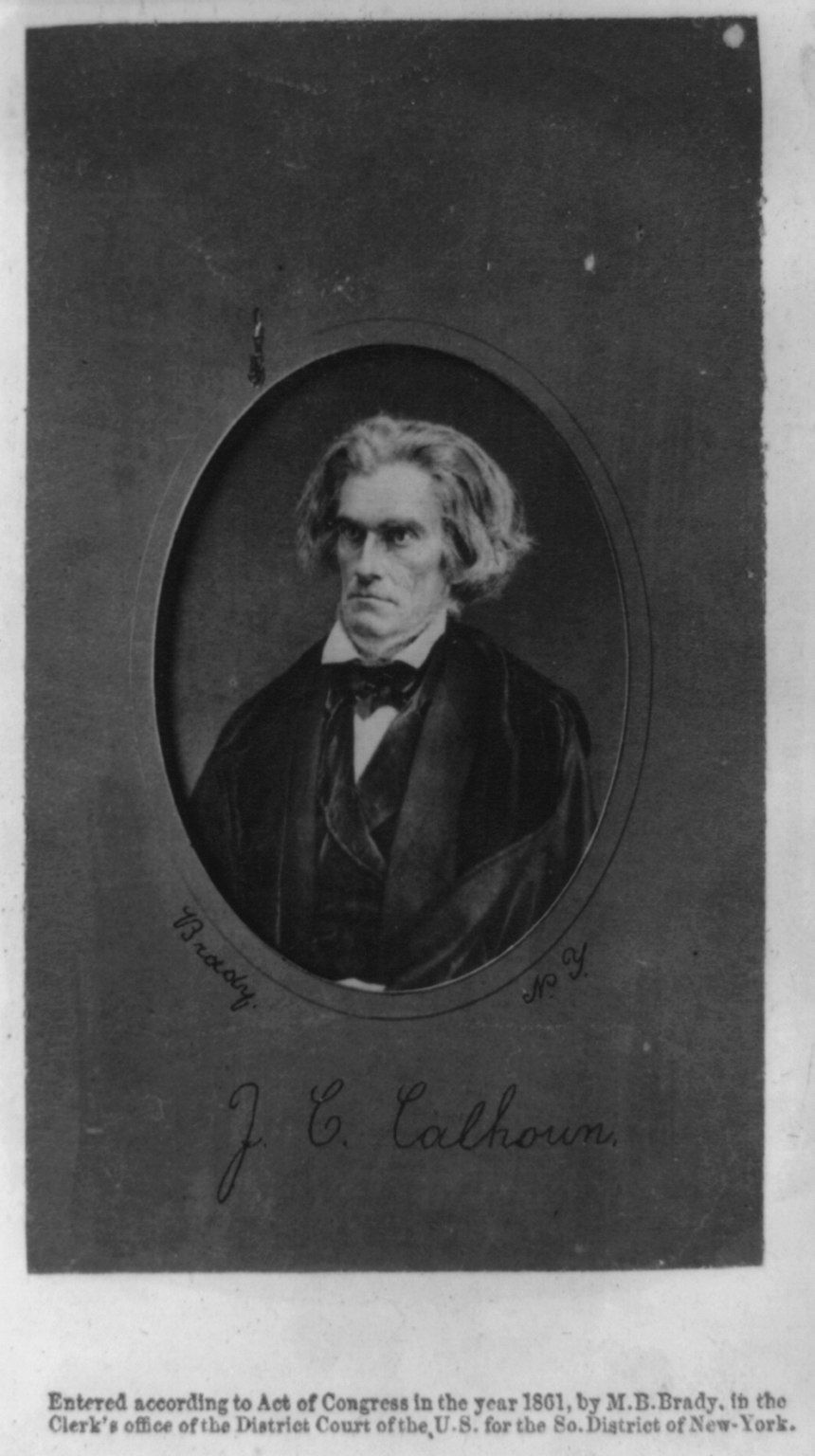
Portrait photograph by Mathew Brady
