= Dewis =

Dewis is a surname. Notable people with the surname include:

- George Dewis (1913–1994), English footballer
- Karen Dewis (born 1962), Canadian tennis player
- Louis Dewis (1872–1946), Belgian painter
- Norman Dewis (1920–2019), English racing driver

== See also ==
- Dewi (disambiguation)
- Dewisland, hundred in Wales
- Dews
- Mewis
