= John Dew =

John Dew may refer to:

- John Dew (cricketer), English cricketer
- John Dew (cardinal), Roman Catholic bishop and cardinal
- John Dew (director), British opera director
