= Children of the revolution =

Children of the revolution may refer to:

- Children of the revolution (concept)
- "Children of the Revolution" (song), a 1972 song by T. Rex
- Children of the Revolution (1996 film), an Australian comedy film
- Children of the Revolution (2002 film), a short film by Zola Maseko
- Children of the Revolution (2010 film), an Irish-British documentary film
- Children of the Revolution (novel), a 2013 novel by Peter Robinson
