= Dewees =

Dewees is a surname. Notable people with the surname include:

- Donnie Dewees (born 1993), American baseball player
- James Dewees (born 1976), American musician
- William Potts Dewees (1768–1841), American physician

== See also ==
- Dewes
