= Dewe =

Dewe may refer to:

- Dewe (woreda), a district in the Afar Region of Ethiopia
- Mount Dewe, a mountain in Antarctica

== People ==
- Bernd Dewe, German sociologist
- Colleen Dewe, New Zealand politician
- Déwé Gorodey, New Caledonian teacher, writer, and politician

== See also ==
- Dew (disambiguation)
- Dewey (disambiguation)
- Deve (disambiguation)
- Diu (disambiguation)
- Dewes, a list of people with the surname
