= Mewes =

Mewes or Mewès is a surname. Notable people with the surname include:

- Charles Mewès (1860–1914), French architect and designer
- Valerie Mewes (1931–1955), English model
- Marianne Mewes, German rower
- Siegmund Mewes (born 1951), East German football player and manager
- Jason Mewes (born 1974), American television and film actor, film producer and internet radio show host.
- David Mewes (born 1976), German decathlete
- William Mewes

== See also ==
- Mewis, surname
