= James H. Hammond =

American politician and planter (1807–1864)

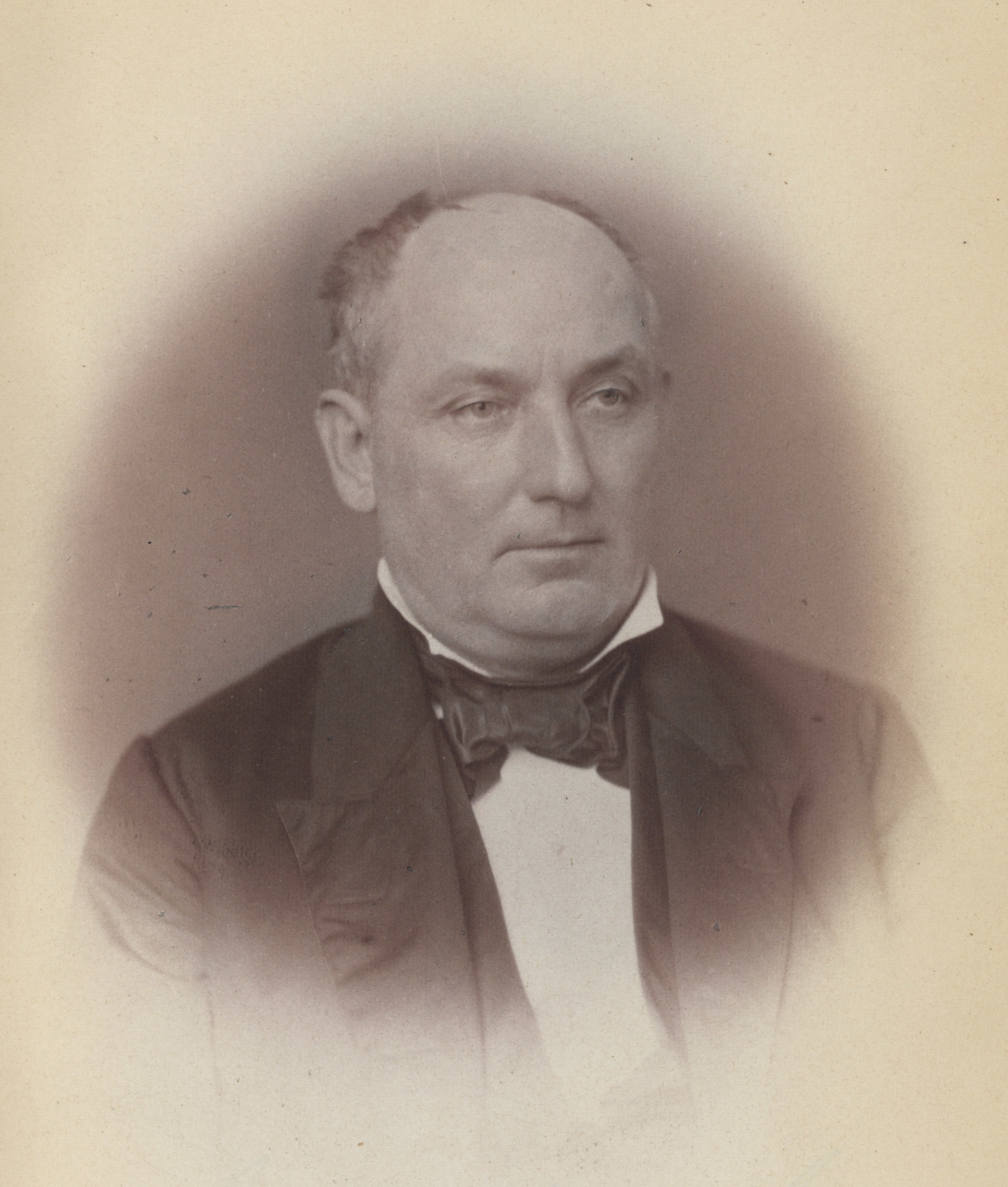

United States Senator from South Carolina
- In office December 7, 1857 – November 11, 1860
- Preceded by: Andrew Butler
- Succeeded by: Frederick A. Sawyer (1868)

60th Governor of South Carolina
- In office December 8, 1842 – December 7, 1844
- Lieutenant: Issac Witherspoon
- Preceded by: John Peter Richardson II
- Succeeded by: William Aiken Jr.

Member of the U.S. House of Representatives from South Carolina's 4th district
- In office March 4, 1835 – February 26, 1836
- Preceded by: John Felder
- Succeeded by: Franklin H. Elmore

Personal details
- Born: James Henry Hammond; November 15, 1807 Newberry County, South Carolina, U.S.
- Died: November 13, 1864 (aged 56) Beech Island, South Carolina, C.S.
- Party: Nullifier (before 1839); Democratic (1842–1864)
- Spouse: Catherine Fitzsimmons
- Education: University of South Carolina, Columbia (BA)

James Henry Hammond (November 15, 1807 – November 13, 1864) was an American attorney, politician, planter, and slave owner. He served as a United States representative from 1835 to 1836, the 60th governor of South Carolina from 1842 to 1844, and a United States senator from 1857 to 1860. A slave owner, Hammond was one of the most ardent supporters of slavery in the years before the American Civil War.

Acquiring property through marriage, Hammond ultimately owned 22 square miles (57 km^{2}), several plantations and houses, and enslaved more than 300 people. Through his wife's family, he was a brother-in-law of Wade Hampton II and uncle to his children, including Wade Hampton III. When the senior Hampton learned that Hammond had raped his four Hampton nieces as teenagers, he made the scandal public. The publicizing of his crimes nearly derailed Hammond's career, but he later was elected to the United States Senate.

== Early life ==
Born November 15, 1807, in Newberry County, South Carolina, to Elisha and Catherine Fox (Spann) Hammond, he graduated from South Carolina College in 1825, where he was a member of the Euphradian Society.

== Career ==
Hammond went on to teach school, write for a newspaper, and study law. Hammond was admitted to the bar in 1828 and started a practice in Columbia, South Carolina, establishing a newspaper to support nullification.

Hammond "secured his financial independence" by marrying Catherine Elizabeth Fitzsimmons, a shy, plain 17-year-old with a substantial dowry. Hammond became a wealthy man through this marriage and entered the planter class. Hammond ultimately owned 22 square miles (57 km^{2}) of land, a number of plantation houses, and enslaved more than 300 people.

After his marriage, Hammond was elected to the United States House of Representatives as a member of the Nullifier Party, serving from 1835 until his resignation the following year due to ill health. After spending two years in Europe, Hammond returned to South Carolina and engaged in agricultural pursuits; managing his extensive holdings took much of his time.

Hammond was elected as governor of South Carolina, serving from 1842 to 1844. The legislature chose him for the United States Senate in 1857 following the death of Andrew Butler. Hammond served from 1857 until his resignation in 1860 in light of South Carolina's declared secession from the United States. Hammond died on November 13, 1864 (two days before his fifty-seventh birthday), at what is now the Redcliffe Plantation State Historic Site in Beech Island, South Carolina.

Hammond considered retiring from the U.S. Senate but felt compelled to stay following John Brown's raid on Harpers Ferry.

== Pro-slavery ==
A Democrat, Hammond was perhaps best known during his lifetime as an outspoken defender of slavery and states' rights. He popularized the phrase that "Cotton is King" in his March 4, 1858, speech to the U.S. Senate, saying:

"In all social systems, there must be a class to do the menial duties, to perform the drudgery of life...It constitutes the very mudsill of society." He uttered the oft-repeated words, "You dare not make war on cotton — no power on earth dares make war upon it. Cotton is king."

In his writings, Hammond consistently compared the South's "well compensated" enslaved labor to the free labor of the North, describing the latter as "scantily compensated" (as he termed the hired skilled laborers and operatives).

Going beyond articles in local newspapers, he co-authored The Pro-Slavery Argument with William Harper, Thomas Roderick Dew, and William Gilmore Simms. Hammond and Simms were part of a "sacred circle" of intellectuals, including Edmund Ruffin, Nathaniel Beverley Tucker, and George Frederick Holmes, who promoted reformation in the South in various forms. As supporters of slavery, they both justified it in terms of stewardship of inferior beings and promoted enslavers' "improvement" of their treatment of enslaved people.

Hammond promoted Redcliffe, his plantation in Beech Island, South Carolina, as his ideal of the perfectly run plantation in his Plantation manual, 1857-58. It includes a wide range of material, with detailed rules regulating treatment of pregnant and nursing enslaved people (whom he allowed to nurse their infants for 12 months), old enslaved people no longer fit for heavy field work, together with rules about clothing, quarters, food, etc., in addition to livestock and crop management.

Hammond rejected any government regulation of slavery, even in wartime. When the South Carolina government requisitioned 16 of his slaves to improve fortifications for Charleston, he refused, calling it "wrong every way and odious." Also, when a Confederate army officer stopped by to requisition some grain, Hammond tore up the requisition order, tossed it out a window, and wrote about it, that it compensated him too little and that it was like "branding on my forehead: 'Slave'".

== Sexual assault ==
Hammond's Secret and Sacred diaries (not published until 1988) described, without embarrassment, his sexual abuse over two years of four teenage nieces, daughters of his sister-in-law Ann Fitzsimmons and her husband Wade Hampton II. He blamed his behavior on what he described as the seductiveness of the "extremely affectionate" young women. The scandal "derailed his political career" for a decade to come after Wade Hampton III publicly accused him in 1843 when Hammond was governor. He was "ostracized by polite society" for some time, but in the late 1850s, he was nonetheless elected by the state legislature as a U.S. senator.

Hammond's damage to the girls was far-reaching, destroying their social prospects. Considered to have tarnished social reputations as a result of his behavior, none of the four ever married.

Hammond was known to have repeatedly raped two enslaved women, one of whom may have been his daughter. He raped the first enslaved woman, Sally Johnson, when she was 18 years old. Such behavior was rampant among white men of power at the time; their mixed-race children were born into slavery and remained there unless the fathers took action to free them. Later, Hammond raped Sally Johnson's daughter, Louisa, who was a year-old baby when he bought her mother. The first rape occurred when Louisa was 12; she also bore several of his children.

Hammond's wife, Catherine, left him for a few years after he repeatedly raped the enslaved girl, taking her children with her. She later returned.

== Homosexual relationship ==
In the late 20th century, historians learned that Hammond, as a young man, had a homosexual relationship with a college friend, Thomas Jefferson Withers, which is attested by two sexually explicit letters sent from Withers to Hammond in 1826. The letters, held among the Hammond Papers at the University of South Carolina, were first published by researcher Martin Duberman in 1981; they are notable as rare documentary evidence of same-sex relationships in the antebellum United States.

== Legacy ==
Hammond School in Columbia, South Carolina, was named the James H. Hammond Academy when founded in 1966. It was one of many private schools known as segregation academies, established to preserve racial segregation in schools. Although many of these segregation academies are now defunct, Hammond School continued to develop; after the 1970s, it expanded its admission policy, as federal law mandated, to be non-discriminatory. The school changed its name to reflect this.

== See also ==
- Mudsill theory
- Proslavery thought
- 21st Rule, 1836 House of Representatives anti-abolition "gag rule"
- List of federal political sex scandals in the United States

== Works cited ==
- Channing, Steven (1974). Crisis of Fear: Secession in South Carolina. W. W. Norton & Company. ISBN 0-393-00730-8.

U.S. House of Representatives
Preceded by John Felder	Member of the U.S. House of Representatives from South Carolina's 4th congressional district 1835–1836	Succeeded by Franklin H. Elmore
Political offices
Preceded by John Peter Richardson II	Governor of South Carolina; 1842–1844	Succeeded by William Aiken Jr.
U.S. Senate
Preceded by Andrew Butler	U.S. Senator (Class 3) from South Carolina; 1857–1860; Served alongside: Josiah J. Evans, Arthur P. Hayne, James Chesnut Jr.	Vacant Title next held by Frederick A. Sawyer; 1868
