= Proslavery thought =

Ideology that supports slavery

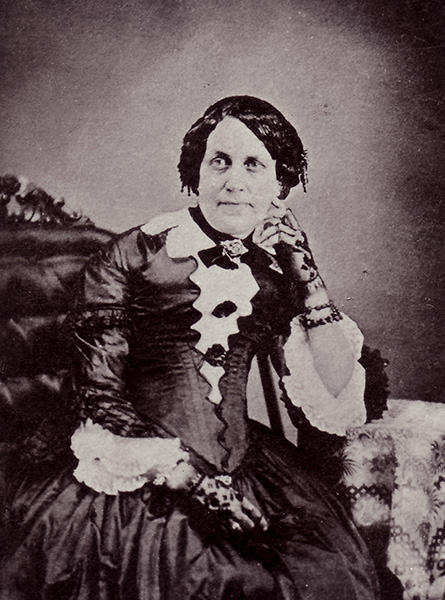
Caroline Lee Hentz, American author, known for opposing the abolitionist movement and her rebuttal to Uncle Tom’s Cabin in the proslavery novel The Planter's Northern Bride

Proslavery (or pro-slavery) thought is known to have existed since classical antiquity. Justifications for slavery are sometimes found in the thought of ancient philosophers, religious texts, and in American and British writings especially before the American Civil War, but also later through the 20th century.

In the Muslim world, slavery was traditionally sanctioned by religious scripture until the abolition of slavery in the 20th century, when new interpretations were made that prohibited slavery; however traditional interpretation were still argued by religious extremists in the 21st century.

Arguments in favor of slavery include deference to religious scripture, some people being natural slaves in need of supervision, slaves often being better off than the poorest non-slaves, practical social benefit for the society as a whole, and slavery being a time-proven practice by multiple great civilizations.

== Ancient, medieval and early modern Jewish views ==
Jewish views on slavery are varied both religiously and historically. Judaism's ancient and medieval religious texts contain numerous laws governing the ownership and treatment of slaves. Texts that contain such regulations include the Hebrew Bible, the Talmud, the 12th-century Mishneh Torah by rabbi Maimonides, and the 16th-century Shulchan Aruch by rabbi Yosef Karo. The original Israelite slavery laws found in the Hebrew Bible bear some resemblance to the 18th-century BCE slavery laws of Hammurabi. The regulations changed over time. The Hebrew Bible contained two sets of laws, one for Canaanite slaves, and a more lenient set of laws for Hebrew slaves. From the time of the Pentateuch, the laws designated for Canaanites were applied to all non-Hebrew slaves. The Talmud's slavery laws, which were established in the second through the fifth centuries CE, contain a single set of rules for all slaves, although there are a few exceptions where Hebrew slaves are treated differently from non-Hebrew slaves. The laws include punishment for slave owners that mistreat their slaves. In the modern era, when the abolitionist movement sought to outlaw slavery, some supporters of slavery used the laws to provide religious justification for the practice of slavery.

Today, slavery is considered absolutely unacceptable in Judaism.

== Ancient Greek views ==
Greek philosopher Aristotle claimed that some people were slaves by nature, and as a result of this belief, he argued that their enslavement was the only way to serve their best interests. However, what Aristotle meant by the word "slavery" is regarded by some political philosophers today to be a subject of controversy. He wrote in book I of the Politics:

Accordingly, those who are as different [from other men] as the soul from the body or man from beast—and they are in this state if their work is the use of the body, and if this is the best that can come from them—are slaves by nature. For them it is better to be ruled in accordance with this sort of rule, if such is the case for the other things mentioned. For he is a slave by nature who is capable of belonging to another–which is also why he belongs to another–and who participates in reason only to the extent of perceiving it, but does not have it.

Plato supported slavery in his Laws.

== Premodern Christian views ==
=== Church Fathers ===
Among the Church Fathers, the majority opinion was in favour of the moral permissibility of slavery. According to Augustine, God approved of the flogging of disobedient slaves: "You must use the whip, use it! God allows it. Rather, he is angered if you do not lash the slave. But do it in a loving and not a cruel spirit." John Chrysostom wrote that "to discipline and punish ignorant slaves is a great accolade, and not a perchance commendation". Tertullian condemned the Marcionites for their advocacy of the liberation of slaves: "what is more unrighteous, more unjust, more dishonest, than to benefit a foreign slave in such a way as to take him away from his master, claim him who is someone else's property".

=== Medieval philosophy ===
Thomas Aquinas argued that slavery was not part of natural law, but nonetheless he defended it as a consequence of human sinfulness and necessary for the good of society. He viewed the natural state of humanity as that which had existed prior to the fall of man, in which slavery was non-existent; on those grounds, many commentators see him as rejecting Aristotle's claim that some people were naturally slaves, although it is a matter of controversy as to whether he fully rejected Aristotle's views on the matter.

== Islamic views ==
Islam traditionally permits slavery, but regulates it.

Islamic law states that what God has made halal (permissible) can not be made haram (prohibited) by man. Islamic law permitted slavery, and slavery survived longest in the Muslim world: by the time of the UN Ad Hoc Committee on Slavery in 1950–1951, legal chattel slavery still existed only in the Islamic Arabian Peninsula: in Oman, in Qatar, in Saudi Arabia, in the Trucial States and in Yemen. Legal chattel slavery was finally abolished in the Arabian Peninsula in the 1960s: in Saudi Arabia and Yemen in 1962, in Dubai in 1963, and Oman, as the last, in 1970; alongside slavery in Mauritania, which was banned in 1981, these were the last five nations in the world to abolish slavery. On the Arabian Peninsula, chattel slavery was replaced by the kafala system, which has been referred to as modern slavery.

Slavery could not be banned in the Muslim world if it was permitted by Islamic law, since what had been made halal by God can not be made haram by human. Consequently, when slavery was indeed banned in Islamic nations, Islamic scholars started to reinterpret Islamic texts, arguing that Islam prohibited slavery. This was necessary to justify the prohibition of slavery. This interpretation had not been the leading one before. Most contemporary Islamic authorities argue that slavery is inapplicable in the modern world. Nonetheless, a minority of contemporary Islamic jurists defend slavery by arguing that it is still relevant and permissible today, and it is actively practiced by Islamist extremist groups, such as Boko Haram in northern Nigeria and Islamic State in parts of Syria and Iraq.

Al-Farabi, early Islamic philosopher and jurist, wrote in support of slavery, arguing that some people are slaves by nature.

== British proslavery movement ==
The British proslavery movement opposed the abolition of the slave trade – from when the campaign for its abolition first began in 1783 until 1807, when it was abolished – and then opposed the abolition of slavery itself in British colonies until that was legislated in 1833. Most of the British defenders of slavery were absentee owners of plantations in the British West Indies who economically benefited from the continuation of the institution.

Paula E. Dumas, in her study of the history of the British proslavery movement, draws a distinction between anti-abolitionist and proslavery positions: "Anti-abolition arguments in this period focused on defects in the abolitionist platform, emphasising the illegal, illogical, inhumane, or pro-French nature of their aims. Proslavery arguments, on the other hand, positively promoted slavery and the slave trade". Dumas notes that proslavery (as opposed to anti-abolitionist) positions largely disappeared from the British parliament after the abolition of the slave trade in 1807. However, other authors do not so clearly draw such a distinction and include what Dumas calls anti-abolitionism in the topic of proslavery. Dumas traces the beginning of organised British proslavery movement to 1787, when the London Society of West India Planters and Merchants formed a subcommittee to organise opposition to abolitionism.

British proslavery thinkers defended slavery on the basis of the Bible. Politician Isaac Gascoyne gave a speech to the House of Commons on 10 June 1806 in which he argued that slavery was authorised by Leviticus 25:44-46. Similarly, on 23 February 1807, George Hibbert gave a speech to the House of Commons defending slavery on the basis of the Old Testament and the Epistle to Philemon. Dumas notes that attempts to directly defend slavery on the basis of the Bible largely disappeared following the abolition of the slave trade in 1807, but its defenders still drew on religious arguments, such that the institution of slavery (allegedly) benefited slaves by encouraging them to convert to Christianity.

After the abolition of the slave trade, British defenders of slavery drew a distinction between slavery itself and the slave trade, acknowledging the latter to be prohibited by the Bible (in particular, Exodus 21:6, Deut 24:7, 1 Tim 1:9-10), but arguing that the Bible permitted the former.

The American proslavery movement drew at times on the British proslavery movement as support. For example, Thomas Roderick Dew, in an essay published in September 1832, quoted approvingly British Foreign Secretary (and later Prime Minister) George Canning's speech to the House of Commons of 16 March 1824 opposing abolition, in which he compared emancipated slaves to Mary Shelley's Frankenstein.

=== John Locke ===
John Locke discusses slavery in his Second Treatise of Government. He rejects the idea that a person could voluntarily consent to enslavement, saying "a man, not having the power of his own life, cannot, by compact or by his own consent, enslave himself to any one, nor put himself under the absolute, arbitrary power of another" (emphasis in original). However, he goes on to argue that enslavement of those who are guilty of capital offences is permissible. He also defends the enslavement of those captured in war: "This is the perfect condition of slavery, which is nothing else, but the state of war continued, between a lawful conqueror and a captive" (emphasis in original).

James Farr describes John Locke as "a merchant adventurer in the African slave trade and an instrument of English colonial policy who proposed legislation [the Fundamental Constitutions of Carolina] to ensure that 'every freeman of Carolina shall have absolute power and authority over his negro slaves'". Farr argues that Locke's theoretical justifications of slavery were inadequate to justify his practical involvement in the slave trade. He sees this contradiction as ultimately unsolvable:

Locke never addressed, much less resolved, this contradiction. On Afro-American slavery, silence seems to have been his principal bequest to posterity. Locke's silence is all the more difficult to fathom inasmuch as in the Two Treatises he developed a general theory and justification of slavery for captives taken in a just war ... I hope to show that this theory is woefully inadequate as an account of Afro-American slavery and, further, that Locke knew this ... Locke's silence about the Afro-American slave practices that he helped forward remains profoundly unsettling and poses one of the greatest problems for understanding Locke as a theorist and political actor.

While Locke criticised slavery as "so vile and miserable an estate of man", Farr argues that this statement was meant primarily as a condemnation of the "enslavement" of the English (which Locke accused advocates of absolute monarchy as effectively proposing), not necessarily as a judgement of the Atlantic slave trade.

== Young Ireland émigrés ==
Young Ireland was a mid-19th century movement in Ireland which espoused Irish nationalism in opposition to British rule. Following the suppression of the movement by the Dublin Castle administration, many of the movement's leading figures went into exile in North America. There, many Young Ireland émigrés such as John Mitchel and Thomas D'Arcy McGee continued to support Irish self-determination while expressing support for the continued existence of slavery in the United States, which consisted of the racialized chattel slavery of African Americans. Newspapers founded by these émigrés, such as the New York City-based Nation and the Boston-based American Celt "were united in their opposition to the abolition of slavery".

== American proslavery movement ==
In the United States, proslavery sentiment arose in the Antebellum South as a reaction to the growing anti-slavery movement in the United States in the late 18th century and early 19th century. Zephaniah Kingsley is the author of the most popular proslavery tract, self-published in 1828 and reprinted three times. In 1846, Matthew Estes published A defence of Negro slavery, as it exists in the United States. A collection of the most important American proslavery articles is The Pro-slavery argument: as maintained by the most distinguished writers of the southern states: Containing the several essays on the subject, of Chancellor Harper, Governor Hammond, Dr. Simms, and Professor Dew (1853). The authors are William Harper, a South Carolina jurist and politician, James Henry Hammond, South Carolina governor and then senator, J. Marion Sims, an Alabama physician, and Thomas Roderick Dew, president of the College of William & Mary.

By 1820, a new proslavery doctrine had emerged in the United States. Building on the concepts of paternalism forged on 18th century tobacco plantations, this notion held that slaves by their natures were unable to take care of themselves, and whites had been appointed by God to watch over their bodies and souls. Southern slave owners said that they were providing what the blacks required, oversight and protection.

Proslavery apologists fought against the abolitionists with their own promotion, which invariably stressed their view that slaves were both well treated and happy, and included illustrations which were designed to prove their points. A writer in 1835 asserted that American slavery is the best slavery there ever was:

[W]e...deny that slavery is sinful or inexpedient. We deny that it is wrong in the abstract. We assert that it is the natural condition of man; that there ever has been, and there ever will be slavery; and we not only claim for ourselves the right to determine for ourselves the relations between master and slave, but we insist that the slavery of the Southern States is the best regulation of slavery, whether we take into consideration the interests of the master or of the slave, that has ever been devised.

While antebellum proslavery thought is primarily associated with the American South, a minority of Northerners, known as doughfaces, also supported it.

=== Abolitionism in the United States ===
Until the middle of the 18th century, slavery was practiced with little challenge anywhere in the world. For centuries philosophers as varied as Aristotle, Thomas Aquinas, and John Locke accepted slavery as part of a proper social system. However, across Europe through the last part of the 18th century there were intellectual antislavery arguments based on Enlightenment thought, as well as moral arguments (notably among Quakers, in Great Britain and the United States) which questioned the legitimacy of slavery. Only in the American Revolutionary War era did slavery first become a significant social issue in North America. In the North, beginning during the Revolution and continuing through the first decade of the next century, state by state emancipation was achieved by legislation or lawsuit although in the larger slaveholding states such as New York and Pennsylvania emancipation was gradual. By 1810, 75% of Northern slaves had been freed and virtually all were freed within the next generation.

In the United States, the antislavery contention that slavery was both economically inefficient and socially detrimental to the country as a whole was more prevalent than philosophical and moral arguments against slavery. In Virginia, as the economy shifted away from tobacco towards less labor-intensive wheat crops, more slaves were freed between 1783 and 1812 than any time until 1865. There was the potential, in many Southern minds, for a relatively short transition away from slavery. However this perspective rapidly changed as the worldwide demand for sugar and cotton from America increased and the Louisiana Purchase opened up vast new territories ideally suited for a plantation economy.

Only in the early 19th century did abolitionist movements gather momentum, and many countries abolished slavery in the first half of the 19th century. The increasing rarity of slavery, combined with an increase in the number of slaves caused by a boom in the cotton trade, drew attention and criticism to the Southern states' continuation of slavery. Faced with this growing 'antislavery' movement, slaveholders and their sympathizers began to articulate an explicit defense of slavery.

=== Political proslavery ===
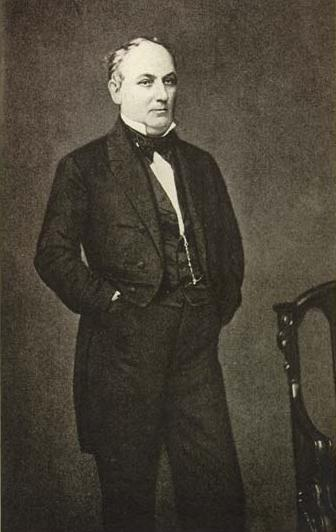
James Henry Hammond

The famous Mudsill Speech (1858) of James Henry Hammond and John C. Calhoun's speech to the U.S. Senate (1837) articulated the proslavery political argument during the period when the ideology was at its most mature (late 1830s – early 1860s). These proslavery theorists championed a class-sensitive view of American antebellum society. They felt that the bane of many past societies was the existence of the class of the landless poor. Southern proslavery theorists felt that this class of landless poor was inherently transient and easily manipulated, and as such often destabilized society as a whole. They saw the greatest threat to democracy as coming from class warfare that destabilized a nation's economy, society, and government, and threatened the peaceful and harmonious implementation of laws.

This theory supposes that there must be, and supposedly always has been, a lower class for the upper classes to rest upon: the metaphor of a mudsill theory being that the lowest threshold (mudsill) supports the foundation for a building. This theory was used by its composer, Senator and Governor James Henry Hammond, a wealthy Southern plantation owner, to justify what he saw as the willingness of the non-whites to perform menial work that enabled the higher classes to move civilization forward. With this in mind, any efforts for class or racial equality that ran counter to the theory would inevitably run counter to civilization itself.

Southern proslavery theorists asserted that slavery eliminated this problem by elevating all free people to the status of "citizen" and removing the landless poor (the "mudsill") from the political process entirely, by means of enslavement. Those who would most threaten economic stability and political harmony were not allowed to undermine a democratic society, because they were not allowed to participate in it. So, in the mindset of proslavery men, slavery was for protecting the common good of slaves, masters, and society as a whole.

The propertied elite used these and other arguments against what were perceived as threats from the abolitionists, lower classes, and non-whites to gain higher standards of living. The economic self-interest of slaveholders certainly played a role, as slaves represented a massive amount of wealth — at the time of the Civil War some historians estimate that more than 20 percent of private wealth in the U.S. consisted of slaves. They saw the abolition of slavery as a threat to the powerful Southern economy, an economy that revolved almost entirely around the plantation system and was supported by slavery.

=== Proslavery Christians ===
To bolster their arguments, proslavery advocates drew upon religious literature and morality to justify their support for slavery. Among the most prominent and influential defenders of slavery were clergymen who combined theological reasoning with scriptural interpretations. Many of these religious leaders used pamphlets and sermons to frame slavery as an institution that was sanctioned divinely with a moral code. It was normal for southern slaveholders to use bible rhetoric as their primary source to legitimize the institution of slavery when preparing a moral defense.

Passages in the Bible which mention the institution of slavery have been used as a justification for the keeping of slaves throughout history, and they have also been used as a source of guidance on how it should be done. Therefore, when abolition was proposed, many Christians spoke vociferously against it, citing the Bible's acceptance of slavery as 'proof' that it was part of the normal condition. George Whitefield, who is famed for his sparking of the Great Awakening of American evangelicalism, supported as necessary due to the climate in the Province of Georgia, for the legalisation of slavery. He believed, as was common at the time, that each race had been conditioned by nature to suit its environment, and viewed the Negro as suited for hot environments. He also believed Georgia's failure to flourish economically was due to a lack of Negroes as were held in other colonies such as The Carolinas. Thus, Whitfield had altered his position, and partially joined the ranks of the slave owners who he had denounced in his earlier years. However, Whitfield still maintained humane treatment was a moral obligation, and a Christian duty, and ultimately never endorsed slavery on any but pragmatic grounds, while contending that Jesus Christ had also died for the Negro slaves, and opposing their mistreatment by owners who resisted his evangelism to slaves. Slavery had been outlawed in Georgia, but it was legalised in 1751. Whitfield bought enslaved Africans and put them to work on his plantation as well as at the Bethesda Orphanage which he established. Selina Hastings, Countess of Huntingdon, who played a major role in financing and guiding early Methodism, inherited these slaves and kept them in bondage.

In both Europe and the United States many Christians went further, arguing that slavery was actually justified by the words and doctrines of the Bible.

[Slavery] was established by decree of Almighty God ... it is sanctioned in the Bible, in both Testaments, from Genesis to Revelation ... it has existed in all ages, has been found among the people of the highest civilization, and in nations of the highest proficiency in the arts.

— Jefferson Davis, President, Confederate States of America

... the right of holding slaves is clearly established in the Holy Scriptures, both by precept and example.

— Richard Furman, President, South Carolina Baptist Convention

In 1837, Southerners in the Presbyterian denomination joined forces with conservative Northerners in order to drive the antislavery New School Presbyterians out of the denomination. In 1844, the Methodist Episcopal Church split into Northern and Southern wings over the issue of slavery. In 1845, the Baptists in the South formed the Southern Baptist Convention due to disputes with Northern Baptists over slavery and missions.

=== Proslavery Jews ===
In the Civil War era, rabbis from the Southern states generally supported slavery, and those from the North generally opposed slavery.

In 1861, the Charlotte Evening Bulletin noted: "It is a singular fact that the most masterly expositions which have lately been made of the constitutional and the religious argument for slavery are from gentlemen of the Hebrew faith". After referring to the speech of Judah Benjamin, the "most unanswerable speech on the rights of the South ever made in the Senate", it refers to the lecture of Rabbi Raphall, "a discourse which stands like the tallest peak of the Himmalohs [sic]—immovable and incomparable". The most notable debate was between Rabbi Morris Jacob Raphall, who defended slavery as it was practiced in the South because slavery was endorsed by the Bible, and rabbi David Einhorn, who opposed its current form. However, there were not many Jews in the South, and Jews accounted for only 1.25% of all Southern slave owners. In 1861, Raphall published his views in a treatise called "The Bible View of Slavery". Raphall and other pro-slavery rabbis such as Isaac Leeser and J. M. Michelbacher (both of Virginia), used the Tanakh (Jewish Bible) to support their arguments.

Abolitionist rabbis, including Einhorn and Michael Heilprin, concerned that Raphall's position would be seen as the official policy of American Judaism, vigorously rebutted his arguments, and argued that slavery—as practiced in the South—was immoral and not endorsed by Judaism.

Ken Yellis, writing in The Forward, has suggested that "the majority of American Jews were mute on the subject, perhaps because they dreaded its tremendous corrosive power. Prior to 1861, there are virtually no instances of rabbinical sermons on slavery, probably due to fear that the controversy would trigger a sectional conflict in which Jewish families would be arrayed on opposite sides. ... America's largest Jewish community, New York's Jews, were overwhelmingly pro-southern, pro-slavery, and anti-Lincoln in the early years of the war." However, as the war progressed, "and the North's military victories mounted, feelings began to shift toward[s] ... the Union and eventually, emancipation."

== Proslavery views in the 20th century ==
In the 20th century, the American philosopher Robert Nozick defended the notion of voluntary slavery, whereby persons voluntarily sell themselves into slavery. In Anarchy, State and Utopia, Nozick writes, "The comparable question about an individual is whether a free system will allow him to sell himself into slavery. I believe that it would." Commenting on Nozick's views, David Ellerman (writing under the pseudonym "J. Philmore") notes parallels with provisions in the Institutes of Justinian that permit individuals to sell themselves into slavery.

Rousas Rushdoony, an adherent of theonomy, believed that Old Testament laws should be applied in the present day, including those laws that permitted slavery. Unlike Nozick, who believed that slavery should be limited to those who voluntarily agreed to it, Rushdoony supported the forcible enslavement of all who rejected Christianity. Rushdoony also asserted that even though antebellum American slavery was un-Biblical, it was still a positive good.

Jack Kershaw, who served as an attorney for James Earl Ray, the assassin of Martin Luther King Jr., is famous for saying "Somebody needs to say a good word for slavery."

Robert Creel, who served as Grand Dragon of Alabama for the United Klans of America from March 1964 to January 1966 and supported Barry Goldwater, once stated: "I got news for you niggers. We're on the move too. I don't believe in segregation. I believe in slavery."

Representative Howard W. Smith (D-VA) had been described by contemporaries as an apologist for slavery who invoked the Ancient Greeks and Romans in its defense, furthermore stating civilizations such as Ancient Egypt and Rome were made great through this institution.

In the 1980s, Rabbi Meir Kahane introduced legislation into Israel's Knesset, which in part stated that "Non-Jews will be obliged to assume duties, taxes and slavery. If he does not agree to slavery and taxes, he will be forcibly deported". The legislation was rejected, with one MK comparing it to Nazi Germany's infamous Nuremberg Laws.

Rabbi Avigdor Miller claimed that the Emancipation Proclamation had come too soon to "civilize" the African Americans.

== See also ==
- Albert Taylor Bledsoe
- Thomas Roderick Dew
- George Fitzhugh
- James Henry Hammond
- William Harper (South Carolina politician)
- Mildred Rutherford
- Slavery and Islam
- Slavery in 21st-century jihadism
