= Redcliffe Plantation State Historic Site =

- Redcliffe
- U.S. National Register of Historic Places
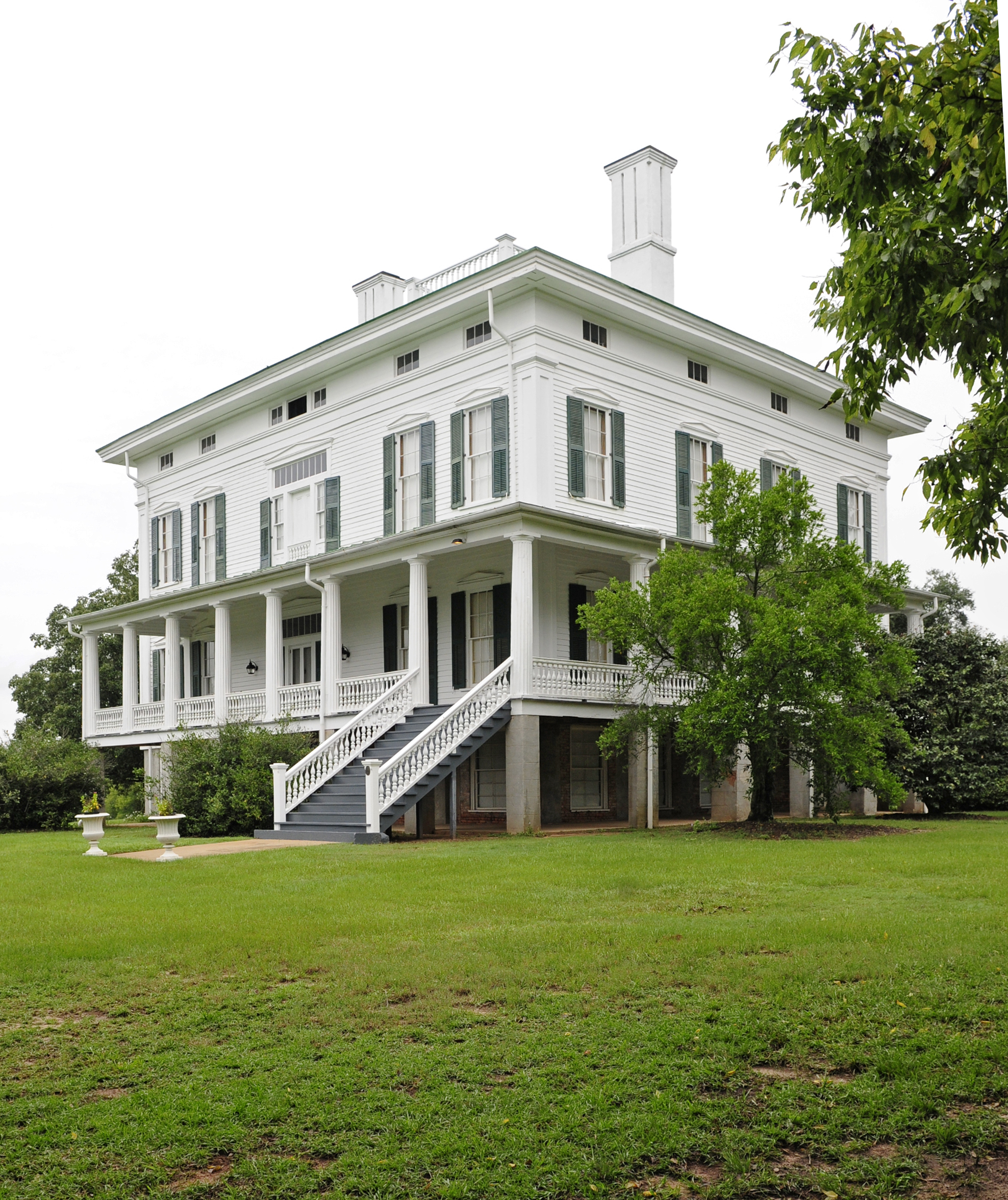

- Location within South Carolina Location within the United States
- Location: 181 Redcliffe Road; Beech Island, South Carolina 29842
- Coordinates: 33°25′06″N 81°52′15″W
- Area: 350 acres (140 ha)
- Built: 1857; 169 years ago
- Architect: Berckmans, Louis
- Architectural style: Greek Revival
- NRHP reference No.: 73001671
- Added to NRHP: May 08, 1973

Redcliffe Plantation State Historic Site is a state park in rural Aiken County, South Carolina, United States. The state park includes:

- 369 acres of land
- Redcliffe Plantation, which is a historic house museum with artifacts from four generations of the Hammond family from 1859-1975
- Two historic circa 1857 slave cabins that interpret the lives of the approximately 300 people Hammond enslaved across his plantations

The site is part of the Reconstruction Era National Historic Network.

The former plantation was not only the home of the Hammonds, but also numerous African-American families like the Henleys, Goodwins, and Wigfalls who worked at the site as enslaved laborers and later as free men and women.

Redcliffe Plantation, also known as Redcliffe, completed in 1859, is a Greek Revival plantation house located on the site that is listed on the National Register of Historic Places. The house was designed by the baron Louis Berckmans and was built in 1857. It was built for James Henry Hammond and was home to three generations of his descendants. His great-grandson John Shaw Billings, editor of Time, Life, and Fortune magazines, donated the estate and collections to the people of South Carolina in 1973. The same year it was added to the National Register of Historic Places.
