= Dew (disambiguation) =

Dew is the condensation of atmospheric water vapour into droplets.

- Dew point is the air temperature at which dew will form.
- Dew point depression is an atmospheric weather term in meteorology.
- Dew pond, artificial pond for watering livestock

Dew or DEW may also refer to:

== Places ==
- Dew, Michigan, a ghost town
- Dew, Texas, American rural community
- Dew Independent School District, American public school district that overlaps Dew, Texas
- Deer Park Airport (Washington), FAA location identifier DEW

== Military ==
- Distant Early Warning Line (DEW Line), network of American radar stations
- Directed-energy weapons (DEW), a type of weapon
- Operation Dew, American biological warfare tests conducted 1951–53

== Others ==
- Dew (film), a 2019 Thai film
- Mountain Dew
- Dew, a historic term used to refer to semen

== See also ==
- Dew (surname), for people with the name
- Dewe (disambiguation)
- DU (disambiguation)
