= Dale Loves Sophie to Death =

1981 novel by Robb Forman Dew

- Author: Robb Forman Dew
- Language: English
- Published: April 1981
- Publisher: Farrar, Straus and Giroux
- Publication place: United States

Dale Loves Sophie to Death (April 1981) is the debut novel of American author Robb Forman Dew. It won the 1982 National Book Award in the category First Novel.

It's a domestic story that takes places over the course of several weeks in the 1970s in Ohio and Massachusetts. The novel is notable for its realistic portrayal of children/adult relationships.
