= George Fitzhugh =

American sociologist (1806–1881)

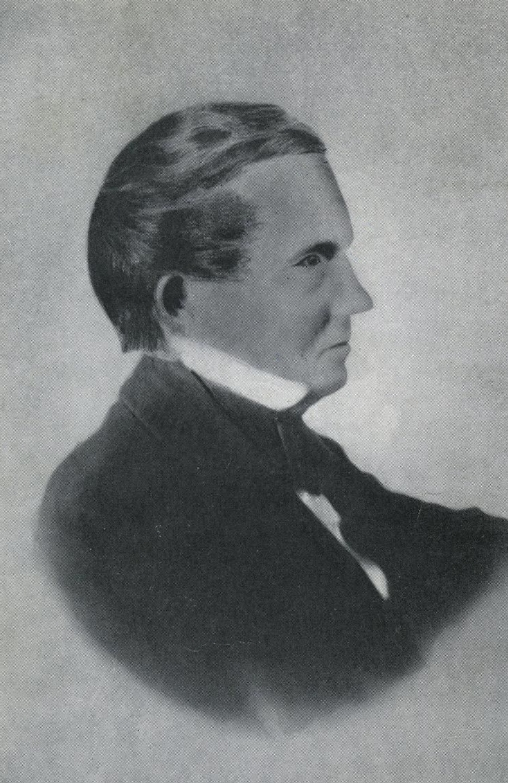
- Fitzhugh c. 1855
- Born: 4 November 1806; Prince William County, Virginia, U.S.
- Died: 30 July 1881 (aged 74); Huntsville, Texas, U.S.
- Occupation: Lawyer
- Spouse: Mary Metcalf Brockenbrough
- Children: Robert Hunter Fitzhugh (1836–1919); Twins Augusta Fitzhugh Woodall (1839–1908); Mariella Foster (1839–1919); Rev. George Stuart Fitzhugh (1844–1925)
- Relatives: George Fitzhugh (father); Lucy Stuart Fitzhugh (mother)

Philosophical work
- Era: 19th century philosophy
- Region: Western philosophy American philosophy
- School: Continental philosophy; Paternalism; Proslavery
- Main interests: Sociology; Slavery as a positive good
- Notable works: Sociology for the South, or, the Failure of Free Society (1854); Cannibals All!, or, Slaves Without Masters (1857)

George Fitzhugh (November 4, 1806 – July 30, 1881) was an American social theorist who published racial and pro-slavery social theories in the pre-Civil War era. He argued that the negro was "but a grown up child" needing the economic and social protections of slavery. Fitzhugh favorably contrasted slavery in the American South with capitalism in the Northern United States, decrying the latter as "a war of the rich with the poor, and the poor with one another", which rendered free blacks "far outstripped or outwitted in the chase of free competition." Slavery, he contended, ensured that blacks would be economically secure and morally civilized. Some historians consider Fitzhugh's worldview to be proto-fascist in its rejection of liberal values, defense of slavery, and perspectives toward race.

Fitzhugh practiced law but attracted both fame and infamy when he published two sociological tracts for the South. He was a leading pro-slavery intellectual and spoke for many of the Southern plantation owners. Before printing books, Fitzhugh tried his hand at a pamphlet, "Slavery Justified" (1849). His first book, Sociology for the South (1854) was not as widely known as his second book, Cannibals All! (1857). Sociology for the South is the first known English-language book to include the term "sociology" in its title.

Fitzhugh differed from nearly all of his southern contemporaries by advocating a slavery that crossed racial boundaries. In Sociology for the South, Fitzhugh proclaimed, "Men are not 'born entitled to equal rights!' It would be far nearer the truth to say, 'that some were born with saddles on their backs, and others booted and spurred to ride them,' – and the riding does them good."; and that the Declaration of Independence "deserves the tumid yet appropriate epithets which Major Lee somewhere applies to the writings of Mr. Jefferson, it is, 'exhuberantly false, and arborescently fallacious.'"

== Life ==
George Fitzhugh was born on November 10, 1806, to George Fitzhugh Sr. (a surgeon/physician) and Lucy (née Stuart) Fitzhugh. He was born in Prince William County, Virginia. His family moved to Alexandria, Virginia, when he was six. He attended public school though his career was built on self-education. He married Mary Metcalf Brockenbrough in 1829 and moved to Port Royal, Virginia. There he began his own law business. Fitzhugh took up residence in a "rickety old mansion" that he inherited through his wife's family, known for a vast collection of bats in its attic. He was something of a recluse in this home for most of his life and rarely travelled away from it for extended periods of time, spending most of his days there engaged in unguided reading from a vast library of books and pamphlets.

Of the writers in his library, Fitzhugh's beliefs were most heavily influenced by Thomas Carlyle, whom he read frequently and referenced in many of his works. Atypical for a slavery advocate, Fitzhugh also subscribed to and regularly read abolitionist pamphlets such as The Liberator. He made only one major visit to other parts of the nation in the entire antebellum period – an 1855 journey to the north where he met and argued with abolitionists Gerrit Smith and Wendell Phillips.

Never politically active in his own right, Fitzhugh managed to find the company of well known political figures in his day. In addition to the two abolitionists, Fitzhugh was an acquaintance of several public officials. In 1857 Fitzhugh served as a law clerk in Washington, D.C. under Attorney General Jeremiah Sullivan Black. He gained fairly wide circulation in print, writing articles for several Virginia newspapers and for the widely circulated Southern magazine DeBow's Review.

After moving to Richmond, Virginia, in 1862 he began to work in the Treasury of the Confederacy. After the Civil War, Fitzhugh spent a short time judging for the Freedmen's Court and then retiring to Kentucky after his wife's death in 1877. He later moved to his daughter's residence in Huntsville, Texas, where he died on July 30, 1881. He is buried in a grave in Oakwood Cemetery, Huntsville, where his daughter, Mariella Fitzhugh Foster and her husband Capt. Marcellus Aurelius Foster are also buried.

== Writings ==
=== Sociology for the South ===
Sociology for the South, or, the Failure of Free Society (1854) was George Fitzhugh's most powerful attack on the philosophical foundations of free society. In it, he took on not only Adam Smith, the foundational thinker of capitalism, but also John Locke, Thomas Jefferson, and the entire liberal tradition. He argued that the transition away from feudalism and the adoption of liberal values like freedom and equality had been detrimental to workers and to society as a whole, and that the liberal experiment had failed and a return to a pre-liberal mode of society was necessary:

Liberty and equality are new things under the sun. The free states of antiquity abounded with slaves. The feudal system that supplanted Roman institutionally changed the form of slavery, but brought with it neither liberty nor equality. France and the Northern States of our Union have alone fully and fairly tried the experiment of a social organization founded upon universal liberty and equality of rights. England has only approximated to this condition in her commercial and manufacturing cities. The examples of small communities in Europe are not fit exponents of the working of the system. In France and in our Northern States the experiment has already failed, if we are to form our opinions from the discontent of the masses, or to believe the evidence of the Socialists, Communists, Anti-Renters, and a thousand other agrarian sects that have arisen in these countries, and threaten to subvert the whole social fabric. The leaders of these sects, at least in France, comprise within their ranks the greater number of the most cultivated and profound minds in the nation, who have made government their study. Add to the evidence of these social philosophers, who, watching closely the working of the system have proclaimed to the world its total failure, the condition of the working classes, and we have conclusive proof that liberty and equality have not conduced to enhance the comfort or the happiness of the people. Crime and pauperism have increased. Riots, trades unions, strikes for higher wages, discontent breaking out into revolution, are things of daily occurrence, and show that the poor see and feel quite as clearly as the philosophers, that their condition is far worse under the new than under the old order of things. Radicalism and Chartism in England owe their birth to the free and equal institutions of her commercial and manufacturing districts, and are little heard of in the quiet farming districts, where remnants of feudalism still exist in the relation of landlord and tenant, and in the laws of entail and primogeniture.

Fitzhugh's position was rooted in a kind of medievalism, widely popular in his day, and held up what he thought medieval society was as an ideal for America, as he clarified in 1858: "In the balmy days of royalty, of feudal nobility, and of Catholic rule, there were no poor in Europe". He argued in Sociology for the South that all societies have a substratum, and that the new liberal social order was more harmful to this substratum than either the previous feudal order or to slavery:

Every social structure must have its substratum. In free society this substratum, the weak, poor and ignorant, is borne down upon and oppressed with continually increasing weight by all above. We have solved the problem of relieving this substratum from the pressure from above. The slaves are the substratum, and the master's feelings and interests alike prevent him from bearing down upon and oppressing them. With us the pressure on society is like that of air or water, so equally diffused as not any where to be felt. With them it is the pressure of the enormous screw, never yielding, continually increasing. Free laborers are little better than trespassers on this earth given by God to all mankind. The birds of the air have nests, and the foxes have holes, but they have not where to lay their heads. They are driven to cities to dwell in damp and crowded cellars, and thousands are even forced to lie in the open air. This accounts for the rapid growth of Northern cities. The feudal Barons were more generous and hospitable and less tyrannical than the petty land-holders of modern times. Besides, each inhabitant of the barony was considered as having some right of residence, some claim to protection from the Lord of the Manor. A few of them escaped to the municipalities for purposes of trade, and to enjoy a larger liberty. Now penury and the want of a home drive thousands to towns. The slave always has a home, always an interest in the proceeds of the soil.

Fitzhugh believed that slavery represented a lingering element of pre-liberal, or even pre-feudal social organization, and proposed the expansion of the institution of slavery to return to a pre-feudal social order of antiquity and alleviate the supposed harm caused by liberalism and capitalism:

The competition among laborers to get employment begets an intestine war, more destructive than the war from above. There is but one remedy for this evil, so inherent in free society, and that is, to identify the interests of the weak and the strong, the poor and the rich. Domestic Slavery does this far better than any other institution. Feudalism only answered the purpose in so far as Feudalism retained the features of slavery. To it (slavery) Greece and Rome, Egypt and Judea, and all the other distinguished States of antiquity, were indebted for their great prosperity and high civilization; a prosperity and a civilization which appear almost miraculous, when we look to their ignorance of the physical sciences. In the moral sciences they were our equals, in the fine arts vastly our superiors. Their poetry, their painting, their sculpture, their drama, their elocution, and their architecture, are models which we imitate, but never equal. In the science of government and of morals, in pure metaphysics, and in all the walks of intellectual philosophy, we have been beating the air with our wings or revolving in circles, but have not advanced an inch. Kant is not ahead of Aristotle [...] But this high civilization and domestic slavery did not merely co-exist, they were cause and effect. Every scholar whose mind is at all imbued with ancient history and literature, sees that Greece and Rome were indebted to this institution alone for the taste, the leisure and the means to cultivate their heads and their hearts.

In order to expand the institution of slavery, Fitzhugh proposed both the enslavement of all free black people and the enslavement of working-class people of all races, making him notable as possibly the only anti-abolitionist to propose slavery be expanded to include white people. Fitzhugh referenced racist justifications for his proposal to re-enslave all free black people, stating that, "unlike the white man, they have no hope of changing and improving their condition whilst free", and that "every other form of government than that of slavery has signally failed in the case of the negro. He is an enemy to himself, and an intolerable pest and nuisance to society, where ever among the whites he is free [...] it is the right and duty of the State to enslave them, because experience has clearly proved that it is the only practicable mode of governing them." While he subscribed to many of the racist views towards black people which were common among anti-abolitionists at the time, he did criticize the racial pseudo-scientific theories proposed by Josiah C. Nott in his book The Types of Mankind.

=== Cannibals All! ===
Cannibals All!, or Slaves Without Masters (1857) was a critique further developing the themes that Fitzhugh had introduced in Sociology for the South. Both the book's title and its subtitle were phrases taken from the writing of Thomas Carlyle, the Scottish social critic and a great hero to Fitzhugh's generation of proslavery thinkers. The aim of his book, Fitzhugh claimed, was to show that "the unrestricted exploitation of so-called free society is more oppressive to the laborer than domestic slavery."

Cannibals All! expanded on Fitzhugh's premise that "slavery to human masters" was "less intolerable" than the "slavery to capital" found in free societies, as well as expanding on his critiques of notions of liberty and equality more generally. In addressing Thomas Jefferson's notions of "natural rights", Fitzhugh stated:

We agree with Mr. Jefferson, that all men have natural and inalienable rights. To violate or disregard such rights, is to oppose the designs and plans of Providence, and cannot "come to good." The order and subordination observable in the physical, animal and human world, show that some are formed for higher, others for lower stations—the few to command, the many to obey. We conclude that about nineteen out of every twenty individuals have "a natural and inalienable right" to be taken care of and protected; to have guardians, trustees, husbands, or masters; in other words, they have a natural and inalienable right to be slaves. The one in twenty are as clearly born or educated, or some way fitted for command and liberty. Not to make them rulers or masters, is as great a violation of natural right, as not to make slaves of the mass. A very little individuality is useful and necessary to society,—much of it begets discord, chaos and anarchy.

Under this same context, Fitzhugh asserted that society was obligated to protect the weak by controlling and subjugating them. Fitzhugh wrote:

"It is the duty of society to protect the weak;" but protection cannot be efficient without the power of control; therefore, "It is the duty of society to enslave the weak."

Regarding the question of who should be free and who should be enslaved, Fitzhugh wrote:

Whilst, as a general and abstract question, negro slavery has no other claims over other forms of slavery, except that from inferiority, or rather peculiarity, of race, almost all negroes require masters, whilst only the children, the women, the very weak, poor, and ignorant, &c., among the whites, need some protective and governing relation of this kind; yet as a subject of temporary, but world-wide importance, negro slavery has become the most necessary of all human institutions.

Fitzhugh also argued that the feudal system had its roots in slavery, and much like slavery, offered more favorable conditions to laborers than those found in liberal free-market capitalist economies:

During the decline of the Roman Empire, slavery became colonial or prædial. The slaves occupied the place of tenants or serfs, were "adscripti soli," and could only be sold with the farm. Many antiquarians consider the colonial slavery of the Romans as the true origin of the feudal system. This kind of slavery was universal in Europe till a few centuries since, and now prevails to a great extent. The serfs of Russia, Poland, Turkey, and Hungary, are happier and better provided for than the free laborers of Western Europe. They have homes, and lands to cultivate. They work but little, because their wants are few and simple. They are not over-worked and under-fed, as are the free laborers of Western Europe. Hence, they never rise in riots and insurrections, burn houses, commit strikes,—nor do they emigrate.

Cannibals All! continued Fitzhugh's criticisms of the foundational guiding principles of the American Revolution, including criticizing the validity of the notion of the consent of the governed:

We do not agree with the authors of the Declaration of Independence, that governments "derive their just powers from the consent of the governed." The women, the children, the negroes, and but few of the non-property holders were consulted, or consented to the Revolution, or the governments that ensued from its success. As to these, the new governments were self-elected despotisms, and the governing class self-elected despots. Those governments originated in force, and have been continued by force. All governments must originate in force, and be continued by force. The very term, government, implies that it is carried on against the consent of the governed. [...] The ancient republics were governed by a small class of adult male citizens, who assumed and exercised the government, without the consent of the governed. The South is governed just as those ancient republics were. In the county in which we live, there are eighteen thousand souls, and only twelve hundred voters.

Cannibals All! garnered more attention in the Liberator, William Lloyd Garrison's abolitionist newspaper, than any other book. Abraham Lincoln is said to have been more angered by George Fitzhugh than by any other pro-slavery writer, yet he unconsciously paraphrased Cannibals All! in his House Divided speech.

== Views ==
=== Socialism ===
Fitzhugh's stated position on socialism varies wildly between and even within his works. At times he is harshly critical of socialists of his time, linking them to abolitionism, stating in Sociology for the South:

We treat the Abolitionists and Socialists as identical, because they are notoriously the same people, employing the same arguments and bent on the same schemes. Abolition is the first step in Socialism: the former proposes to abolish negro slavery, the latter all kinds of slavery – religion, government, marriage, families, property – nay, human nature itself. Yet the former contains the germ of the latter, and very soon ripens into it; Abolition is Socialism in its infancy.

At other times he sympathized with socialist critiques of liberal free market economies, but argued that reverting to an older feudal or pre-feudal social model through the expansion of slavery was a more effective means to the end of addressing the destitution caused by capitalism, and that proposals by socialists were untested and went against human nature:

We entirely agree with the socialists, that free competition is the bane of modern society. We also agree with them, that it is right and necessary to establish in some modified degree, a community of property. We agree with them in the end they propose to attain, and only differ as to the means. [...] What madness and folly, at this late day, to form society for human beings regardless of human nature. Yet the Socialists are guilty of this folly, and gravely propose to change man's nature to fit him for their new institutions. How much more wise, prudent and philosophical it would be to recur to some old tried forms of society, especially as we shall presently show that such forms of society have existed, and do now exist, as will remove all the evils they complain of, and attain all the ends they propose.

After the Civil War however Fitzhugh shifted his position on capitalism and especially the monopolization of land, arguing that rather than being more oppressive to the laborer than slavery or serfdom, as he had formerly argued, the subjugation of the laborer through the monopolization of land had, in his view, a positive civilizing effect similar to that of slavery, stating in Land Monopoly – Savage Nature (1867):

Land Monopoly, or the private ownership of lands by the few, civilizes the landless, by making them quasi-slaves- that is, slaves to capital. 'The land owners, would not produce luxuries, fine houses, fine furniture, fine clothes and fine equipage for themselves; nay, they would live, as savages, on the barest necessaries of life, had they to support themselves by manual labor. But desiring the luxuries of life, they say to the landless, we will permit you to live on our lands and cultivate them, provided you will furnish us, not only with the necessaries, but also with whatever is beautiful or ornamental in architecture, in dress, furniture, equipage, etc., and with all the luxuries of the table. This is an inestimable blessing to the laboring landless millions, for it habituates them to labor, system, economy and provident habits, and leaves them, from the results of their own labor, after paying the taxes or' rents to the land owners, twice as much of the comforts and necessaries of life as the best conditioned savages enjoy. Thus begins civilization, and thus only can it begin. Where there is no slavery to capital there cannot possibly be any civilization.

=== Slavery in the abstract ===
George Fitzhugh was among a cadre of Southern intellectuals who advocated for a universal slavery which included the white race. Fitzhugh's contempt for wage labor and laissez-faire capitalism are themes which dominated his Failure of Free Society and Cannibals All! In these works, Fitzhugh argued free labor was a crueler system than slavery. The results of free labor alienated the working class and therefore, produced movements for socialism, abolitionism, and feminism. As a solution, Fitzhugh advocated for extending the paternalistic relationship of the plantation system to encompass lower class whites. Fitzhugh postulated slavery as a humane alternative for both black and white laborers that would rectify the evils in laissez-faire capitalism. Although the idea of universal slavery was unpopular, Fitzhugh advocated expanding the South's institution of slavery until 1867, when he conceded wage labor was an adequate replacement for slavery.

=== Authoritarianism ===
George Fitzhugh held many moderate and mainstream Southern opinions. Nonetheless, by the standards of his Antebellum contemporaries, many of Fitzhugh's ideas were radical. He conceived of violence and war as progressive forces that would heal society from its degeneration. Fitzhugh also attacked the legitimacy of representative institutions for their failure to protect slavery. Fitzhugh was a prolific reactionary who advocated anything necessary to preserve slavery such as military dictatorship. Fitzhugh differed from his peers in promoting absolute power at the expense of the slave master class' rights. While some historians argue that Fitzhugh's radicalism was a natural outgrowth of slavery, other historians point out Thomas Carlyle's salient impact on Fitzhugh's authoritarian sentiments. The authoritarian and forward looking qualities of Fitzhugh's rhetoric has been seen by some historians as proto-fascist or a type of fascist intellectualism.

== Works ==
=== Books ===
- (1854). Sociology for the South, or, the Failure of Free Society. Richmond: A. Morris.
- (1857). Cannibals All!, or Slaves Without Masters, A. Morris Publisher.

=== Articles ===
- "Centralization and Socialism," DeBow's Review, Vol. XX, 1856.
- "The Counter Current, or Slavery Principles," DeBow's Review, Vol. XXI, 1856.
- "The Conservative Principle; or, Social Evils and Their Remedies," DeBow's Review, Vol. XXII, 1857.
- "The Conservative Principle; or, Social Evils and Their Remedies, Part II: The Slave Trade," DeBow's Review, Vol. XXII, 1857.
- "Black Republicanism in Athens," DeBow's Review, Vol. XXIII, 1857.
- "The Politics and Economics of Aristotle and Mr. Calhoun," DeBow's Review, Vol. XXIII, 1857.
- "Southern Thought — Its New and Important Manifestations," DeBow's Review, Vol. XXIII, 1857.
- "Southern Thought Again," DeBow's Review, Vol. XXIII, 1857.
- "Wealth of the North and the South," DeBow's Review, Vol. XXIII, 1857.
- "Private and Public Luxury," DeBow's Review, Vol. XXIV, 1858.
- "The White Slave Trade," DeBow's Review, Vol. XXIV, 1858.
- "Public Lands of Rome and America," DeBow's Review, Vol. XXIV, 1858.
- "Washington City," DeBow's Review, Vol. XXIV, 1858.
- "Reaction and the Administration," Part II, DeBow's Review, Vol. XXV, 1858.
- "The Atlantic Telegraph—Ancient Art and Modern Progress," DeBow's Review, Vol. XXV, 1858.
- "Acquisition of Mexico—Filibustering", DeBow's Review, Vol. XXV, 1858.
- "Origin of Civilization—What is Property?—Which is the Best Slave Race," DeBow's Review, Vol. XXV, 1858.
- "Old Churchies, Ministers and Families of Virginia," DeBow's Review, Vol. XXVI, 1859.
- "The Administration and the Slave Trade," DeBow's Review, Vol. XXVI, 1859.
- "The Valleys of Virginia — The Rappahannock," Part II, DeBow's Review, Vol. XXVI, 1859.
- "The Old Dominion — Valley of Rappahannock," DeBow's Review, Vol. XXVI, 1859.
- "Ancient Families of Virginia, Maryland," DeBow's Review, Vol. XXVI, 1859.
- "Uniform Postage, Railroads, Telegraphs, Fashions," DeBow's Review, Vol. XXVI, 1859.
- "Samuel Nott, of Massachusetts, on European Experiments with Serfdom," DeBow's Review, Vol. XXVII, 1859.
- "Law Reports—Multiplicity of Law-Books," DeBow's Review, Vol. XXVII, 1859.
- "Trade and Panics," DeBow's Review, Vol. XXVII, 1859.
- "Entails and Primogeniture," DeBow's Review, Vol. XXVII, 1859.
- "The Northern Neck of Virginia," DeBow's Review, Vol. XXVII, 1859.
- "Missionary Failures," DeBow's Review, Vol. XXVII, 1859.
- "Life and Liberty in America," DeBow's Review, Vol. XXVII, 1859.
- "Bayard Taylor's Travels in Greece and Russia," DeBow's Review, Vol. XXVII, 1859.
- "Modern Agriculture," DeBow's Review, Vol. XXVII, 1859.
- "Disunion within the Union," DeBow's Review, Vol. XXVIII, 1860.
- "Ancient and Modern Art and Literature," DeBow's Review, Vol. XXVIII, 1860.
- "Slavery Aggressions," DeBow's Review, Vol. XXVIII, 1860.
- "Love of Danger and Love of War," DeBow's Review, Vol. XXVIII, 1860.
- "The English Reviews," DeBow's Review, Vol. XXVIII, 1860.
- "Johnson, Boswell, Goldsmith etc.," DeBow's Review, Vol. XXVIII, 1860.
- "Oliver Goldsmith and Dr. Johnson," DeBow's Review, Vol. XXVIII, 1860.
- "Popular Institutions," DeBow's Review, Vol. XXVIII, 1860.
- "Make Home Attractive," DeBow's Review, Vol. XXVIII, 1860.
- "Milton and Macaulay," DeBow's Review, Vol. XXVIII, 1860.
- "Milton, Byron, and Southey," DeBow's Review, Vol. XXIX, 1860.
- "The Domain of Fashion," DeBow's Review, Vol. XXIX, 1860.
- "One Idea," "DeBow's Review", Vol. XXX, 1861
- "The Times and the War," DeBow's Review, Vol. XXXI, 1861.
- "Hayti and the Monroe Doctrine," DeBow's Review, Vol. XXXI, 1861.
- "The Women of the South," DeBow's Review, Vol. XXXI, 1861.
- "Superiority of Southern Races," DeBow's Review, Vol. XXXI, 1861.
- "Reflections on the Conduct of the War," DeBow's Review, Vol. XXXI, 1861.
- "Society, Labor, Capital, Etc.," DeBow's Review, Vol. XXXII, 1862.
- "Conduct of the War," DeBow's Review, Vol. XXXII, 1862.
- "History of the Origin of Representative Government in Europe, by M. Guizot," DeBow's Review, Vol. XXXII, 1862.
- "Antinomic Pathology," Southern Literary Messenger, Vol. XXXVII, July 1863.
- "The Uses and Morality of War and Peace," DeBow's Review, January 1866.
- "Virginia—Her Past, Present, and Future," DeBow's Review, February 1866.
- "Liberty and Civilization," DeBow's Review, March 1866.
- "Pecuniary Independence—What Is It?," DeBow's Review, May 1866.
- "What's to Be Done with the Negroes?," DeBow's Review, June 1866.
- "Home Education and the Home Circle," DeBow's Review, July 1866.
- "Shall the Spartan Virtues of the South Survive the War?," DeBow's Review, August 1866.
- "Terribly in Earnest," DeBow's Review, August 1866.
- "Commerce, War, and Civilization," DeBow's Review, September 1866.
- "Old Maids and Old Bachelors," DeBow's Review, September 1866.
- "Camp Lee and the Freedmen's Bureau," DeBow's Review, October 1866.
- "National Debt a National Blessing," DeBow's Review, October 1866.
- "Thad. Stevens's Conscience," DeBow's Review, November 1866.
- "The Freedmen," DeBow's Review, November 1866.
- "Impending Fate of the Country," DeBow's Review, December 1866.
- "John Stuart Mill on Political Economy," DeBow's Review, January 1867.
- "Excess of Population and Increase of Crime and Pauperism," DeBow's Review, February 1867.
- "Our Trip to the Country," DeBow's Review, February 1867.
- "Monarchy in America," DeBow's Review, March 1867.
- "Exodus from the South," DeBow's Review, April/May 1867.
- "Liberty versus Government," DeBow's Review, April/May 1867.
- "Moral Philosophies," DeBow's Review, April/May 1867.
- "The Negro Imbroglio," DeBow's Review, June 1867.
- "Still Life in the Country," DeBow's Review, June 1867.
- "Revolutions of '76 and '61," DeBow's Review, August 1867.
- "The Poor House System," DeBow's Review, August 1867.
- "Mandeville's Fable of the Bees," DeBow's Review, September 1867.
- "Cui Bono. The Negro Vote," DeBow's Review, October 1867.
- "Land Monopoly — Savage Nature," DeBow's Review, November 1867.
- "The Return of Good Feeling," DeBow's Review, December 1867.
- "Land Monopoly," Lippincott's Magazine, Vol. IV, September 1869.

=== Other ===
- A Controversy on Slavery Between George Fitzhugh and A. Hogeboom, Printed at the "Oneida Sachem" Office, 1857.
- Ante-bellum: Writings of George Fitzhugh and Hinton Rowan Helper on Slavery, Capricorn Books 1960.
