= William Harper (South Carolina politician) =

American jurist, politician, and socio-political theorist (1790–1847)

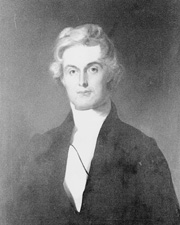

United States Senator from South Carolina
- In office March 8, 1826 – November 29, 1826
- Appointed by: Richard Irvine Manning I
- Preceded by: John Gaillard
- Succeeded by: William Smith

Speaker of the South Carolina House of Representatives
- In office November 24, 1828 – December 20, 1828
- Governor: John Taylor; Stephen Decatur Miller
- Preceded by: John Belton O'Neal
- Succeeded by: Benjamin Faneuil Dunkin

Member of the South Carolina House of Representatives from St. Philip's and St. Michael's Parish
- In office November 24, 1828 – December 20, 1828

Personal details
- Born: January 17, 1790 Antigua
- Died: October 10, 1847 (aged 57) South Carolina
- Party: Jacksonian

William Joseph Harper (January 17, 1790 – October 10, 1847) was a jurist, politician, and social and political theorist from South Carolina.

== Political career ==
Born in Antigua and partly educated in Baltimore, Harper became one of the most prominent lawyers in Columbia during the 1810s. After a brief stint as a chancellor in the Missouri territory, he returned to South Carolina in 1823. In 1826 Governor Richard Manning appointed Harper to fill the U.S. Senate seat that had become vacant with the death of John Gaillard. He served from March 28 until December 7, 1826, when the South Carolina legislature elected William Smith.

Returning to his home state, Harper moved to Charleston and became active in state politics. He served in the state house of representatives, the South Carolina Court of Appeals, and as state chancellor, an office he held from 1835 until his death. Throughout the 1820s and 1830s, Harper was an active defender of South Carolina, free trade, and state rights. He prominently supported the nullification movement led by John C. Calhoun, and argued in a series of court opinions that states in the Union were sovereign political entities, each possessing the right to reject federal laws it found unconstitutional.

== Defense of slavery ==
Harper is likely best remembered as an early and important representative of pro-slavery thought. His Memoir on Slavery, first given as a lecture in 1838, and reprinted in the Southern Literary Journal, classed Harper as a leading proponent of the notion that slavery was not merely a necessary evil, but as a positive social good.

Harper advanced several philosophical, racial, and economic arguments on behalf of slavery, but his central idea was that "slavery anticipates the benefits of civilization, and retards the evils of civilization." The slaveholding South, he contended, had achieved a social balance that allowed for steady economic and technological progress, while avoiding the chaos of urban and industrial society. Harper's assessment of other nations around the world confirmed this point of view: non-slaveholding civilizations in northern climates, such as Great Britain, were riven by inequality, political radicalism, and other dangers. Non-slaveholding civilizations in more southerly areas, meanwhile, such as Spain, Italy, and Mexico, were rapidly slipping into "degeneracy and barbarism." Only the slaveholding Southern United States, Brazil and Cuba could be seen making "favorable progress."

Like nearly every other defender of slavery before 1840, Harper nominally conceded that slavery, at an abstract level, did constitute a sort of (necessary) moral evil. Yet his strong, positive emphasis on the social and economic benefits of the institution separate him from the weaker apologists for slavery in earlier decades. Harper's idea of slavery as a social good put him on par with Thomas Roderick Dew, James Henry Hammond, and other significant figures in the history of pro-slavery thought.

== Commentary on Harper ==
The Christian minister and socialist Kirby Page writes in Jesus or Christianity (1929):

Chancellor William Harper once declared that "the Creator did not intend that every individual human being should be highly cultivated morally and intellectually. It is better that a part should be fully and highly cultivated, and the rest utterly ignorant."

Chancellor William Harper quoted with enthusiasm from an article which said; "Slavery has done more to elevate a degraded race in the scale of humanity; to tame the savage; to civilize the barbarous; to soften the ferocious; to enlighten the ignorant, and to spread the blessings of Christianity among the heathen, than all the missionaries that philanthropy and religion have ever sent forth."

== See also ==
- List of United States senators born outside the United States

U.S. Senate
Preceded by John Gaillard	U.S. senator (Class 3) from South Carolina; 1826; Served alongside: Robert Y. Hayne	Succeeded by William Smith
