= Robb Forman Dew =

American writer (1946–2020)

- Born: October 26, 1946; Mount Vernon, Ohio, U.S.
- Died: May 22, 2020 (aged 73); Springfield, Massachusetts, U.S.
- Education: Louisiana State University
- Occupation: Writer
- Spouse: Charles B. Dew (m. 1968)
- Children: 2
- Parent(s): Oliver Duane Forman; Helen Ransom Forman
- Relatives: John Crowe Ransom (grandfather)
- Writing career
- Genres: Fiction; non-fiction
- Notable awards: National Book Award (1982)

Robb Forman Dew (October 26, 1946 – May 22, 2020) was an American writer known for fiction that dealt sensitively with the emotions of daily life and the ties that bind people together as families. She described writing as "a strange absorption about this alternate world and the way it mixes with your real life."

Born in Mount Vernon, Ohio, on October 26, 1946, Dew was the daughter of Oliver Duane Forman, a neurosurgeon, and Helen Ransom Forman. Her mother’s parents, Robb Reavill and the poet and critic John Crowe Ransom, lived in nearby Gambier, Ohio, where Ransom taught at Kenyon College and edited the influential Kenyon Review. Growing up, Dew divided her time between Baton Rouge, Louisiana, where her father had his medical practice, and Gambier, where she stayed with her grandparents. In Gambier, she found herself surrounded by poets and writers connected with the Kenyon Review, as well as by friends, colleagues, and former students of her grandfather. One of these former students, Robert Penn Warren, became her godfather.

She attended Louisiana State University for two years. In 1968, she married Charles B. Dew, and the following year moved with him to Columbia, Missouri, where Charles taught history at the University of Missouri. They had two sons, Charles Stephen, born in 1971, and John Forman, born in 1973. In 1977 the family moved to Williamstown, Massachusetts, where Charles B. Dew is now the Ephraim Williams Professor of American History at Williams College.

Her first novel, Dale Loves Sophie to Death, was published in 1981 and won the 1982 National Book Award in category First Novel. The book‘s title was originally graffiti on a railroad bridge (now demolished), just south of Centerburg, Ohio. Central Ohio would be the setting for much of her fiction.

She taught at the Iowa Writer's Workshop, received a Guggenheim fellowship, and was awarded an honorary degree by Kenyon College in 2007.

Robb Forman Dew died in Springfield, Massachusetts on May 22, 2020 due to endocarditis. She was 73 years old.

== Books ==
Dew's books include: (fiction)

- Dew, Robb Forman (1981). Dale Loves Sophie to Death. New York: Farrar, Straus, Giroux. ISBN 0-374-13450-2.
- Dew, Robb Forman (1984). The Time of Her Life. New York: W. Morrow. ISBN 0-688-03918-9.
- Dew, Robb Forman (1992). Fortunate Lives. New York: W. Morrow. ISBN 0-688-10781-8.
- Dew, Robb Forman (2001). The Evidence Against Her: A Novel. Boston: Little, Brown. ISBN 0-316-89019-7.
- Dew, Robb Forman (2005). The Truth of the Matter: A Novel. Boston: Little, Brown. ISBN 0-316-89004-9.
- Dew, Robb Forman (2011). Being Polite to Hitler. Boston: Little, Brown. ISBN 978-0-316-88950-6.

(non-fiction)

- Dew, Robb Forman (1994). The Family Heart: A Memoir of When Our Son Came Out. Boston: Addison-Wesley. ISBN 0-201-62450-8.
- Dew, Robb Forman (1992). A Southern Thanksgiving: Recipes and Musings for a Manageable Feast. Harlow: Addison Wesley. ISBN 0-201-63215-2.
