= Revolutionary generation =

A revolutionary generation is a generation of people for whom a revolution was a major event or influence in their lives. Such revolutions are usually associated with particular nations. The children of this generation are called the children of the revolution.

== Americas ==
=== Cuba ===
The revolutionaries of 1959 in Cuba were known as the Generation of the Centenary after the 100 year anniversary of the birth of José Martí in 1853.

=== United States ===
Evarts Boutell Greene dated the generation of the American Revolution as being from 1763 to 1790.

== Asia ==
=== China ===
The first political generation of leaders in the People's Republic of China are part of the revolutionary generation in China, such as Mao Zedong, Zhu De and Zhou Enlai,

=== Israel ===
The Second Aliyah generation was arguably the most important and influential aliyah. It took place between 1904 and 1914, during which approximately 40,000 Jews immigrated into Ottoman Palestine, mostly from Russia and Poland, some from Yemen. They were the generation that created the social, political and cultural foundations of the State of Israel.

== Europe ==
=== France ===
The Université state education system established by Napoleon created a post-revolutionary generation in France.

=== Germany ===
The 1840s were a decisive decade which culminated in the Revolutions of 1848 which defined a generation of Germans.

=== Romania ===
In Romania, people who were born in 1989 are called the Revolution Generation, in reference to the Romanian Revolution of 1989 that ended the brutal Communist regime of Nicolae Ceaușescu and brought democracy and rule of law to Romania.

=== Yugoslavia ===
The generation that came of age during or immediately after World War II and subsequent rise of communism. It is a generation marked by greater social mobility in comparison to previous period of Kingdom of Yugoslavia, which permitted the large section of population to obtain education. It was also marked by rapid urbanization and industrialization of the country, with a big population shift from rural to urban areas.
