= Mudsill theory =

Proposition that an underclass is necessary

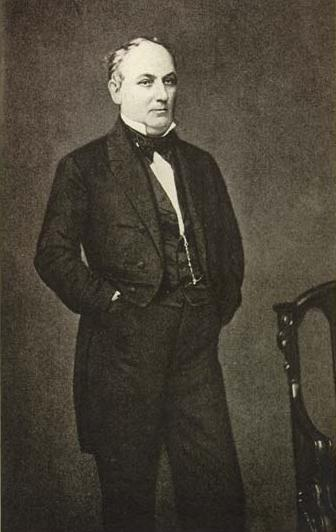
James H. Hammond coined the "Mudsill Theory".

The Mudsill theory is a proposition that there must be, and always has been, a lower class or underclass for the upper classes and the rest of society to rest upon.

The term derives from a mudsill, the lowest threshold that supports the foundation for a building.

== History ==
The theory was first articulated by James H. Hammond, a Democratic United States senator from South Carolina and a wealthy Southern plantation owner, in a speech on March 4, 1858. Hammond argued that every society must find a class of people to do menial labor, whether called slaves or not, and that assigning that status on a racial basis followed natural law, while the Northern United States' social class of white wage laborers presented a revolutionary threat.

== Criticism ==
Many saw the argument as a weak justification for exploitation and a flimsy example of manipulating science to reference as proof.

Mudsill theory and similar rhetoric has been dubbed "the Marxism of the Master-Class" which fought for the rights of the propertied elite against what were perceived as threats from the abolitionists, lower classes and non-whites to gain higher standards of living.

Abraham Lincoln argued forcefully against the mudsill theory, particularly in a speech in Milwaukee, Wisconsin, in 1859, where he delineated its incompatibility with Free Soil. In his view, mudsill advocates "conclude that all laborers are necessarily either hired laborers, or slaves" since to them, "nobody labors unless somebody else, owning capital... induces him to do it." Further, mudsillers believed that these laborers were "fatally fixed" in their status. Lincoln contrasted his view that labor was in fact the source of capital by noting that a majority of persons in Free States were "neither hirers nor hired" but in such professions as farming, where they worked for themselves.

== See also ==
- Class conflict
- Class collaboration
- Ethnocentrism
- George Fitzhugh
- Lumpenproletariat
- Proslavery thought
- Social inequality
- Wage slavery
