= Dews =

Dews is a surname, and may refer to:

- Bobby Dews (1939-2015), American baseball player
- George Dews (1921–2003), English cricketer and footballer
- Ian Dews (born 1964), English cricketer
- John Dews (1945-1995), British motorcycle speedway rider
- Peter Dews (born 1952), British philosopher
- Peter Dews (director) (1929–1997), English stage director

== See also ==
- Dewes
- DEWS, the Distant Early Warning System
- DEWs, directed-energy weapons
