= Charles B. Dew =

American historian (born 1937)

Charles Burgess Dew
- Born: 1937 (age 88–89); St. Petersburg, Florida, U.S.
- Education: Williams College (BA); Johns Hopkins University (PhD)
- Occupations: Historian, author, professor
- Spouse: Robb Forman Dew
- Scientific career
- Doctoral advisor: C. Vann Woodward

Charles Burgess Dew (born 1937) is an American author and historian, specializing in the history of the Southern United States, American Civil War and the Reconstruction era, and holds the Ephraim Williams Professorship of American History at Williams College. His first of three published books was a New York Times Notable Book of the Year.

== Early life and education ==
Dew was born in St. Petersburg, Florida, in 1937 to the former Amy Kirk Meek and her lawyer husband, Jack Carlos Dew. His recent memoir characterizes both as "dyed-in-the-wool Southerners", although his mother had been born in Wayne County, West Virginia. His parents married in 1931, despite the Great Depression having wiped out his father's savings, and took up residence in St. Petersburg and had two sons—Charles and his older brother John—before moving to the "better" side of St. Petersburg in 1937.

His paternal grandfather, Charles Givens Dew (1865–1916), had farmed and dug water wells around Trenton, Tennessee, before moving to Louisiana in hope of striking oil, but ultimately moved with his family to Florida's west coast in 1912 after learning he had contracted tuberculosis. However, he died four years later, leaving his widow (Bessie Lane Dew) to raise three boys and three girls, so the older boys became clerks in the local hardware shore and his father (as the youngest son, aged 13) rose early to sell newspapers to early morning train passengers. Ultimately, his uncles founded Dew Cadillac and Dew Furniture, both of which became household names in St. Petersburg. His uncles paid for their brother's (his man's father's) education at the University of Virginia and its law school, where his parents met. His maternal grandfather was a prominent attorney in Huntington, West Virginia, and his wife, Charlie Burgess Meek, would be memorialized in this boy's middle name.

Dew attended the local St. Petersburg public schools before leaving West Florida in 1951 to attend Woodberry Forest School in Virginia, which his brother John had earlier attended. His memoir relates that although his maternal grandmother died when he was an infant, his paternal grandmother made sure he read the magazine of the United Daughters of the Confederacy, in which she was an active member. His father's law partner also gave him a book entitled Facts the Historians Leave Out: A Confederate Youth's Primer. Dew also relates his father's political conservatism (from opposition to Franklin D. Roosevelt's name and Sen. Claude Pepper to the Brown v. Board of Education decisions in 1955), as well as drinking problem, but notes his kindliness toward and sense of responsibility for elderly widows, which caused his father's practice to gravitate toward estate law.

Dew's memoir also states his family had African-American help, who ate and drank from separated plates and cups, and who used a "grossly unequal" bathroom. In an essay he wrote in 2016, Dew commented that he had not crossed the Mason–Dixon line until he went to college in 1954, and that his experiences at Williams College—where he studied history (which "blew [his] assumptions about Confederate glory out of the water") and had black classmates—were formative for his developing a critique of what he termed "collective white blindness". He graduated from Williams in 1958 and received his Ph.D. in history from Johns Hopkins University in 1964. His thesis advisor was C. Vann Woodward, who had been a professor at Johns Hopkins and continued keeping Dew as an advisee after he accepted a position at Yale University.

Dew claims proslavery advocate Thomas Roderick Dew (1802–1846) as an ancestor in his recent memoir. He came across a price list for slaves from 1860 and thought, "[H]ow could my white southern ancestors have been complicit in this?", to which the only answers are greed and the belief in white superiority, which Southern boys received "by osmosis". In an earlier book, Dew recounted finding a pivotal link between secession and racism as a graduate student upon reading a December 1860 letter from Alabama lawyer and secession commissioner Stephen F. Hale.

== Personal life ==
Dew was married to writer Robb Forman Dew until her death in 2020. Their two sons survived their mother.

== Writings ==
- Dew, Charles B. (2016). The Making of a Racist: A Southerner Reflects on Family, History, and the Slave Trade. Charlottesville, Virginia: University of Virginia Press. ISBN 978-0813938875.

- Critic Leonard Pitts was less than impressed with the answers that Dew provided for why he and his family remained racist for a long time, though he found his account of falling away from the racism of his family and region "compelling".

- Dew, Charles B. (2001). Apostles of Disunion: Southern Secession Commissioners and the Causes of the Civil War. Charlottesville: University Press of Virginia.
- Dew, Charles B. (1994). Bond of Iron: Master and Slave at Buffalo Forge. New York: W. W. Norton. ISBN 9780393313598. Notable Book of the Year for 1994 by The New York Times Book Review; published as paperback in 1995.
- Dew, Charles B. (1999) [1966]. Ironmaker to the Confederacy: Joseph R. Anderson and the Tredegar Iron Work. Richmond, Virginia: Library of Virginia. OCLC 425962019.
