= Susan Dew Hoff =

American physician

Susan Dew Hoff (née, Dew; November 24, 1842 – January 2, 1933) was an American physician and the first woman licensed to practice medicine in West Virginia.

== Early life and education ==
Susan Matilda Dew was born on November 24, 1842, in Hampshire County, Virginia to William Henry Harrison Dew and Jane Davis Dew. Growing up, she assisted her father with his medical practice and once he died, she inherited his medical library. She married James Hoff in 1869 and they had five children together before she chose to pursue a career in medicine. Although her husband discouraged it, she decided to continue studying.

== Career ==
When Dew Hoff approached the West Virginia State Board for a license to become a practicing physician, she was told, "We will make no difference on account of sex or physician." To prepare herself for the State Board Examinations, Dew Hoff studied the medical books from her father's library. She traveled to Wheeling, West Virginia to take the exam, which lasted a day and a half and included both written and oral segments. Following the exam on April 19, 1889, she was informed she was the first woman to pass the examination and earned the highest score of anyone who had taken the tests.

After earning her medical license, Dew Hoff returned to her home in West Milford without the intention of opening her father's office, but she was approached by her father's former patients due to her reputation as his assistant. When Dew Hoff began practicing medicine, she made house calls on horseback, charging $1 for each call plus $1 per mile of travel. Her charge for delivering a baby was $5 plus travel expenses.

Following Dew Hoff's death on January 2, 1933, a free health clinic in West Milford was named the Susan Dew Hoff Memorial Clinic in her honor.
