= Portrait of Charles Sumner =

1873 painting by Walter Ingalls

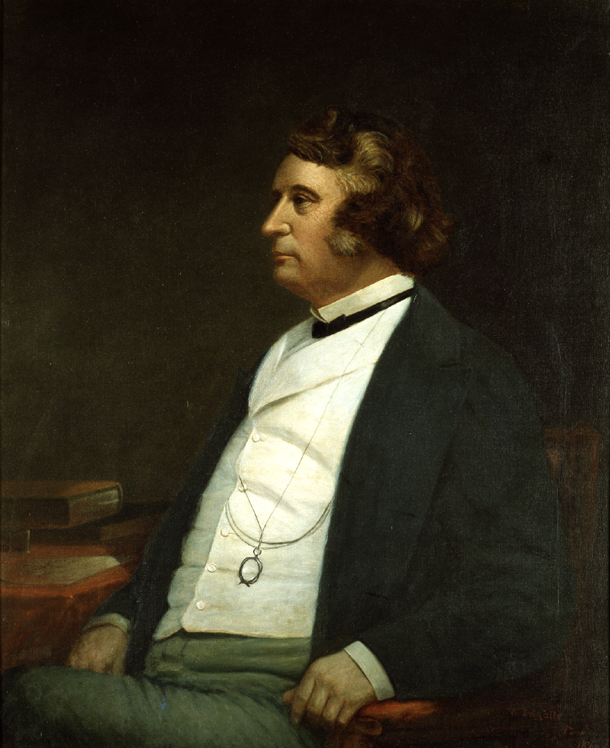
- Artist: Walter Ingalls
- Year: 1873
- Medium: oil paint, canvas
- Dimensions: 111.4 cm (43.9 in) × 89.9 cm (35.4 in)
- Location: United States Capitol
- Accession: 32.00016.000

Portrait of Charles Sumner is an 1873 oil on canvas portrait painting by Walter Ingalls, now in United States Capitol in Washington, D.C. It is one of the paintings that possibly suffered damage from tear gas and pepper spray during the 2021 storming of the United States Capitol.

The artwork portrays Charles Sumner, a man notable at the Capitol for two reasons; firstly for his suffering at the hands of his political opponents Andrew Butler and Preston Brooks, now known as the Caning of Charles Sumner, and secondly because he was so popular that he was laid in state before burial in the United States Capitol rotunda. Sumner sat for his portrait in a temporary studio at the Capitol for Ingalls in 1873. The resulting portrait was purchased for the Capitol collection in 1886.

Walter Ingalls chose a similar pose to an old photograph taken in 1860 by Capitol photographer Mathew Brady, suggesting either that he had possibly not finished his painting before his subject's death, or that his sitter's popularity was linked to his debilitating condition caused by the 1856 caning incident and should be remembered as he was in younger days. As an abolitionist, he would not have approved the confederate flag being flown before his portrait in 2021.

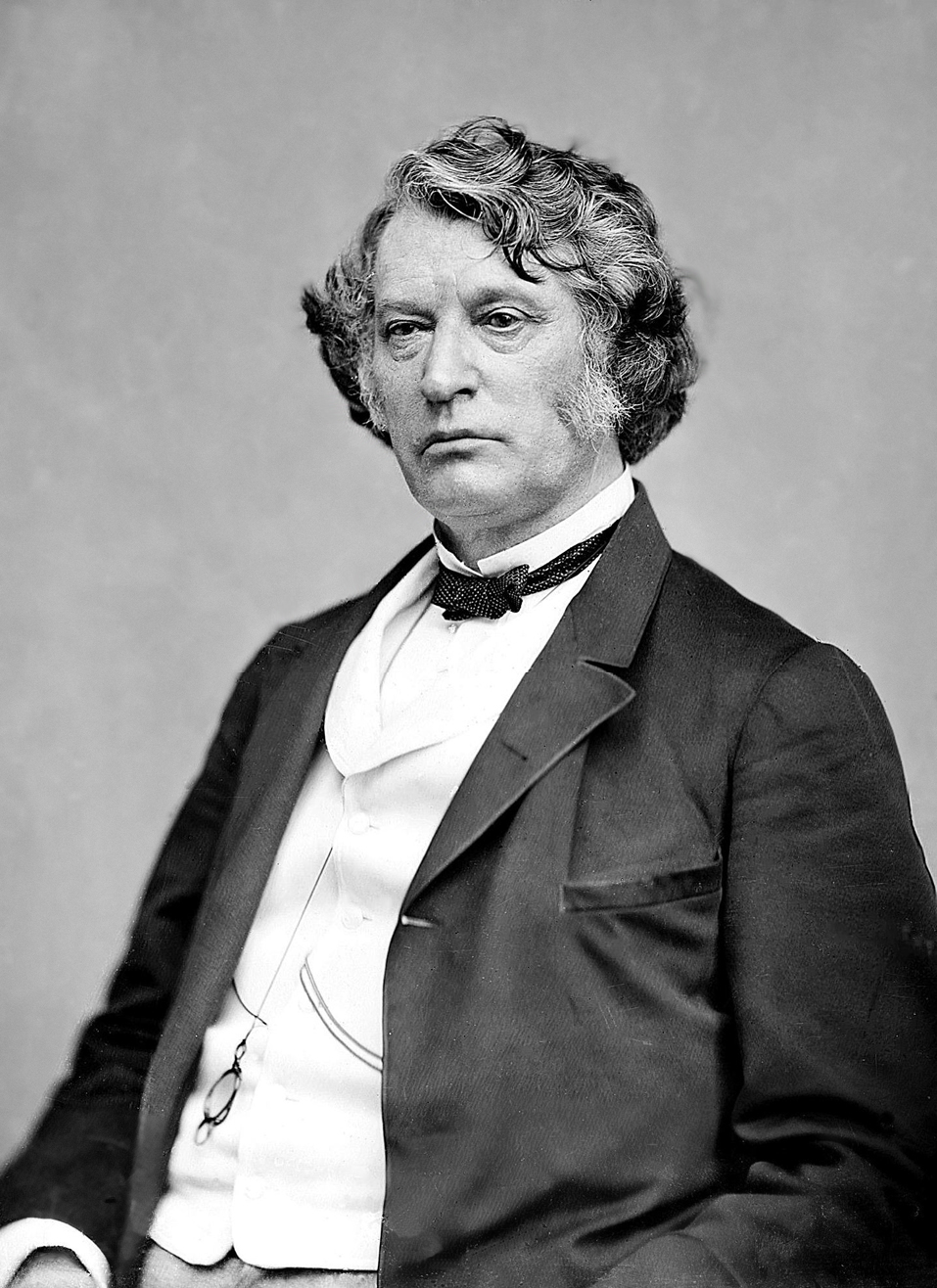
Portrait photograph from the Brady-Handy photograph collection
