= Ian Dews =

English cricketer

Personal information
- Born: June 24, 1964; Wakefield, Yorkshire
- Batting: Left-handed
- Bowling: Right-arm offbreak

Domestic team information
- Years: Team
- Yorkshire

Ian Michael Dews (born 24 June 1964) is a former English cricketer. He was a left-handed batsman and a right-arm off spin bowler.

Dews spent most of his career with York Cricket Club, six years as captain. In 1996, he became Cricket Development Officer for Yorkshire covering North Yorkshire. 2000 saw him become involved with the Yorkshire County Cricket Club Academy, before taking over as Director in 2004. Dews has achieved his level four cricket coaching certificate.

On 8 March 2007, Dews was confirmed as part of the Yorkshire first team management set-up. He was named Director of Cricket Operations, working alongside Martyn Moxon as Director of Pro Cricket, Steve Oldham as bowling coach and Kevin Sharp as batting coach.

His current title is Director of Cricket Development.
