= Children of the revolution (concept) =

First generation born after a revolution

Children of the revolution is a concept associated with the generation growing up after revolutionary activity. It refers to the first generation of persons born after a revolution. They are the children of the Revolutionary generation.

== Usage ==
The children of the revolution are a blank slate on which the values of the revolution are imposed. Because the generation have no shared memory of the prior world they cannot compare the new system with the old and will uncritically accept the new system as the natural order.

The phrase usually refers to political revolutions.

The concept is also applied to revolutions in culture, science, and art.
