= Mewis =

Mewis is a surname. Notable people with the name include:

- Jozef Mewis (1931–2025), Belgian Olympic wrestler
- Kristie Mewis (born 1991), American association football player
- Sam Mewis (born 1992), American association football player, World Cup Champion and Olympian

== See also ==
- Mewes, surname
