= John Dew (cricketer) =

English cricketer

Personal information
- Full name: John Alexander Dew
- Born: 12 May 1920; Horsham, Sussex, England
- Died: 7 September 2008 (aged 88); Horsham, Sussex, England
- Batting: Right-handed
- Role: Wicket-keeper

Domestic team information
- Years: Team
- 1947: Sussex

Career statistics
| Competition | First-class |
|---|---|
| Matches | 3 |
| Runs scored | 60 |
| Batting average | 12.00 |
| 100s/50s | –/– |
| Top score | 29 |
| Catches/stumpings | 5/1 |
- Source: Cricinfo, 13 March 2012

John Alexander Dew MBE (12 May 1920 – 7 September 2008) was an English cricketer. Dew was a right-handed batsman who fielded as a wicket-keeper. He was born at Horsham, Sussex.

Educated at Tonbridge School, Dew played cricket and rugby for the school, it was in rugby that he captained the school. From Tonbridge, he read medicine at St Catharine's College, Cambridge. While at St Catharine's he played cricket for Cambridge University Cricket Club (though the suspension of first-class cricket at the time due to World War II meant none of his matches were first-class), earning a wartime Blue. After leaving St Catharine's, he qualified as a medical practitioner at the Royal London Hospital.

In first-class cricket, Dew made two first-class appearances for Sussex in the 1947 County Championship against Worcestershire and Warwickshire, scoring a total of 51 runs at an average of 17.00, with a high score of 29, while behind the stumps he took a single catch and made a single stumping. Fourteen years later, he made a third and last appearance in first-class cricket, this time for L.C. Stevens' XI against Cambridge University at The Saffrons, Eastbourne, with Dew scoring 9 runs in the match, as well as taking 4 catches. Outside of first-class cricket, he played for Horsham Cricket Club, captaining the club for ten years and serving as its President for 47 years. He was the founder of the Sussex Cricket Festival, and was heavily involved in coaching young cricketers.

Staying close to his roots for much of his life, Dew worked as a GP in the Horsham area. In addition to that, he was a founding member of the West Sussex Philharmonic Choir, as well as a governor of Collyer's College in Horsham. He also served as a Deputy Lieutenant of Sussex, and was appointed MBE for services to the community. He died at the town of his birth on 7 September 2008. Following his death, he was awarded a Lifetime Achiever award by the England and Wales Cricket Board in October 2008, and a new building at Collyer's College was named after him.
