= Dewes =

Dewes is a surname. Notable people with the surname include:

- Albert Dewes (1860–1892), New Zealand cricketer
- Francis Dewes (1845–1922) German-American brewer
- Graham Dewes (born 1982), Fijian rugby union player
- John Dewes (1926–2015), English cricketer

== See also ==
- Dews
