= Thomas Roderick Dew =

American economist (1802–1846)

13th President of the College of William & Mary
- In office 1836–1846
- Preceded by: Adam Empie
- Succeeded by: Robert Saunders, Jr.

Personal details
- Born: December 5, 1802 King and Queen County, Virginia, United States
- Died: August 6, 1846 (aged 43) Paris, France
- Education: The College of William & Mary
- Occupation: Professor of History, Metaphysics, and Political Economy, College of William & Mary
- Known for: Proslavery writings

Thomas Roderick Dew (December 5, 1802 – August 6, 1846) was a professor and public intellectual, then president of The College of William & Mary (1836–1846). Although he first achieved national stature for opposing protective tariffs, today Dew may be best known for his pro-slavery advocacy.

== Early life and education ==
Thomas Dew was born in King and Queen County, Virginia, in 1802, son of the former Lucy Gatewood and her Maryland-born husband, Captain Thomas Dew (1763–1849). His father had been a Revolutionary War soldier. Settling in Virginia, the elder Thomas Dew established a plantation near Newtown in King and Queen County that he named "Dewsville" and which prospered by the use of enslaved labor (Thomas R. Dew owned 39 slaves in King and Queen County in 1820). The family included five sons. The eldest son, Dr. William Dew (1796–1855), received 500 acres and a new house (now operating as Providence Plantation and Farm) as a wedding present in 1826. The family also included at least one daughter who survived to adulthood, married and had children, Mary Ellen Gresham (1786–1836).

Dew received a private education appropriate to his class, and in 1818 began attending The College of William & Mary in Williamsburg. After graduating in 1820, Dew continued his studies and received a master's degree in 1824. Having been diagnosed with a pulmonary illness, Dew traveled and studied in Europe for two years.

== Career ==
On October 16, 1826, Dew became a professor of history and political law at William & Mary. He would teach those subjects, as well as metaphysics and political economy at William & Mary from 1827 to 1836. In 1836, Dew became the College President, and enrollment grew during the decade of his presidency, which ended with his death as described below. While Dew's positions on slavery and opposition to women voting are discussed at length below, his opposition to tariffs was also popular with Southern audiences. Dew twice declined invitations to run for political office, as well as invitations to teach at South Carolina College (today the University of South Carolina) and the University of Virginia.

=== Tariff opponent ===
Dew came to national prominence in 1828 when he attacked the tariff that passed that year (also known as the "Tariff of Abominations"). He was a proponent of free trade, arguing that export taxes benefited Northern manufacturers at the expense of Southern planters. He supported state banks over a national bank, stating that centralized banking would give the government too much control over the economy. Dew contributed to the Southern Literary Messenger and the Southern Review as well as gave lectures, but his largest book was the posthumously published Digest of the Laws, Customs, Manners, and Institutions of Ancient and Modern Nations (1853). A source was P. Austin Nuttall's 1840 Classical and Archaeological Dictionary.

=== Pro-slavery advocate ===
In 1832, Dew published a review of the celebrated slavery debate of 1831–32 in the Virginia General Assembly, A Review of the Debates in the Legislature of 1831 and 1832, which went far towards putting a stop to a movement, then assuming considerable proportions, to proclaim the end of slavery in Virginia. The Virginia Legislature's debate was a response to Nat Turner's slave rebellion of August 1831. Dew argued that whites and freed blacks could not live alongside one other in peace, and stated that slavery was established by God while also acknowledging slavery violated the spirit of Christianity. Dew dismissed colonization of freed American blacks in Africa as prohibitively expensive and logistically impractical; that Blacks did not want to go was of no importance to him. He noted also that the deportation of blacks would prevent Virginia from profiting from its breeding and export of negroes, as "a negro raising state for other states" of the South. While many Southern readers were convinced by Dew's pro-slavery arguments, Dew also argued that Virginia was "too far north for slave labor" and personally owned only one slave from the 1830s until his death. Moreover, Jesse Burton Harrison, of Lynchburg, Virginia, wrote a robust response that argued that colonization (sending freed slaves to Africa) was possible and that slavery was economically inefficient. One recent scholar denies the nuances or contradictions in Dew's market-based slavery advocacy.

In his inaugural speech as president at William & Mary, Dew "admonished young planters to resist fanatics who wished to eliminate slavery. Dew emphasized the importance of a broad-based liberal arts education but singled out morals and politics as the most significant subjects of study."

Dew was well respected in the South; his widely distributed writings helped to confirm pro-slavery public opinion. His work resembles Southern surgeon and medical authority Samuel A. Cartwright, who defended slavery and invented the "diseases" of drapetomania (the "madness" that makes slaves want to run away), and dysaesthesia aethiopica ("rascality"), both of which were "cured" with beatings. Dew's 1833 Review was republished in 1849, and collected in The Pro-Slavery Argument, together with writings by Harper, Hammond and Simms.

Contemporaries credited Dew for defeating proposals to end slavery in Virginia in the 1830s. Dew opposed even gradual emancipation. His teaching and his writings influenced later generations, which opposed Reconstruction and created Jim Crow.

=== Dew on men and women ===
Dew characterized women as modest, passive, virtuous, and religiously devout, which he attributed to women's physical weakness, and which made them dependent on male goodwill. Dew also asserted that men were intellectually superior to women (across all cultures and historical periods), but blamed the disparity on educational differences rather than unequal natural endowments. Dew advocated denying suffrage to women "because their intense focus on their own families impeded their ability to comprehend broader political developments."

Dew also described the hardships men faced in the marketplace, as well as the almost brutal strength needed to survive in such a competitive atmosphere. He stated that courage and boldness are man's attributes. For Dew, women were dependent and weak, but a spring of irresistible power.

== Personal life, and death and legacy ==
Dew died of bronchitis in Paris on his honeymoon, a day after completing his transatlantic voyage. He had married Natalia Burwell Hay, daughter of Dr. Hay of Clarke County. He was buried at Montmartre cemetery, but in 1939 his remains were moved to the crypt under the Wren Chapel on the William & Mary campus. A compilation of his history lectures was published posthumously as A Digest of the Laws, Customs, Manners, and Institutions of the Ancient and Modern Nations (1853). Providence Plantation and Farm, his eldest brother's house was listed on the National Register of Historic Places in 2009, although still in private hands.

At least four of his nephews fought as Confederate soldiers in the American Civil War: Sylvanius Gresham having participated in thwarting Dahlgren's Raid and his namesake Thomas R. Dew rising from corporal to captain and his two brothers also were CSA officers. Although Dew had no children and thus no direct descendants, a collateral relative, Charles B. Dew, a professor of Southern history at Williams College, wrote in The Making of a Racist (2016) of his Southern family's tradition of racism.

== Works by Thomas R. Dew ==
- Lectures on the restrictive system : delivered to the senior political class of William and Mary College. Richmond. 1829.
- Free Trade Convention (to be annexed to Doc. No. 82.) : communication of Wm. Harper and Thomas R. Dew, in relation to the memorial of the committee of the Free Trade Convention against the tariff. House of Representatives?. February 13, 1832.
- Abolition of slavery : review of the debate in the Virginia legislature, 1831-'32. Washington, D.C.: Duff Green. 1833.
  - An Essay on Slavery (2nd ed.). Richmond, VA. 1849. (The "first edition" is the 1833 publication cited above.)
  - "The Pro-slavery argument: as maintained by the most distinguished writers of the southern states : Containing the several essays on the subject, of Chancellor Harper, Governor Hammond, Dr. Simms, and Professor Dew". Philadelphia. 1853.
  - Torr, James D., ed. (2004). "Emancipation Is Impractical". Slavery. Greenhaven Press. ISBN 073771705X.
- Z. X. W. (May 1835). "Dissertation on the Characteristic Differences of the Sexes, and Woman's Position and Influence in Society, No. I". Southern Literary Messenger. Vol. 1, no. 9. pp. 493–512.
  - Unsigned (July 1835). "Dissertation on the Characteristic Differences between the Sexes, and Woman's Position and Influence in Society, No. II". Southern Literary Messenger. Vol. 1, no. 11. pp. 621–632.
  - Unsigned (August 1835). "Dissertation on the Characteristic Differences between the Sexes, and on the Position and Influence of Woman in Society, No. III". Southern Literary Messenger. Vol. 1, no. 12. pp. 672–691.
- The great question of the day letter from President Thomas R. Dew, of William and Mary college, Virginia, to a representative in Congress from that state : on the subject of financial policy of the administration ... Washington, D.C.: T. Allen. 1840. (16 page pamphlet)
- A digest of the laws, customs, manners, and institutions of the ancient and modern nations. New York: D. Appleton & Company. 1853.

=== Briefer pieces, letters, speeches ===
- Memorial of a committee appointed by the Free Trade Convention : held in Philadelphia in September and October, 1831, upon the subject of the present tariff of duties. 1832. OCLC 34565448. "With William Harper and Albert Gallatin."
- "Essay on the interest of money and the policy of laws against usury". Farmers' Register. 1834.
- "An Address on the Influence of the Federative Republican System of Government Upon Literature and the Development of Character". Southern Literary Messenger. Vol. 2, no. 4. March 1836. pp. 261–282.
- An address delivered before the students of William and Mary, at the opening of the college, on Monday, October 10th, 1836. Richmond, VA: T.W. White. 1836.
- The great question of the day : letter from President Thomas R. Dew, of William and Mary college, Virginia, to a representative in Congress from that state : on the subject of financial policy of the administration ... Washington: T. Allen. 1840. "Reprint from Washington newspaper The Madisonian. Selected Americana from Sabin's Dictionary of books relating to America; fiches A-11,071-11,072)."
- A letter of President Thomas R. Dew to Professor John Millington. Williamsburg, VA: King and Queen Press. 1964. "A letter to Professor Millington dated Sept. 21, 1837, requesting him 'to purchase 2 or 300$ worth of books for Wm. & Mary College Library'."

== Archival material ==
Dew's family papers and papers from his time as president of the College of William and Mary can be found at the Special Collections Research Center at the College of William and Mary.

== Media ==
- A non-existent book by Dew, Inequality Is the Basis of Society, appears in the Spaghetti Western Sabata (1969) starring Lee Van Cleef, in which the book is read by the villain. Stengel reads a quotation from it: "All men gifted with superior talent and thus with superior powers must command and use inferior men."

== Further reading (arranged by date) ==
- Bryan, John Stewart (July 1939). "Thomas Roderick Dew: An Address Delivered April 3, 1939, at the Memorial Service for the Thirteenth President of the College of William and Mary in Virginia, Who Died in Paris, France, August 6, 1864". Bulletin of The College of William and Mary in Virginia. Vol. 33, no. 8.
- Mansfield, Stephen (October 1967). "Thomas R. Dew at William and Mary: 'A Main Prop of that Venerable Institution'". Virginia Magazine of History and Biography. Vol. 75. pp. 429–442.
- Mansfield, Stephen S. (1968). Thomas Roderick Dew: defender of the southern faith (Thesis). Charlottesville, VA: University of Virginia.
- Booker, H. Marshall (Autumn 1969). "Thomas R. Dew: Forgotten Virginian". Virginia Cavalcade. Vol. 19. pp. 20–29.
- Genovese, Eugene D. (1986). Western civilization through slaveholding eyes : the social and historical thought of Thomas Roderick Dew. New Orleans: Graduate School of Tulane University.
- Dudley, William (1992). Slavery : opposing viewpoints. San Diego, CA: Greenhaven Press. ISBN 1565100131.
- Austin, Clara (2000). The apologist tradition : a transitional period in southern proslavery thought, 1831-1845 (Thesis). University of North Texas.
- Root, Erik S. (2008). All honor to Jefferson? : the Virginia slavery debates and the positive good thesis. Lanham, MD: Lexington Books. ISBN 9780739122174. "Chapter: 'The proslavery argument revisited: Thomas Roderick Dew and the beginning of the positive good thesis'."
- Brophy, Alfred L. (2016). University, Court, and Slave: Proslavery Academic Thought and Southern Jurisprudence, 1831–1861. Oxford University Press. ISBN 9780199964239. "Chapter 2: The Rebel and the Professor: Nat Turner, Thomas Roderick Dew, and the Utility of Slavery"
- Dew, Charles B. (2016). The Making of a Racist : a Southerner reflects on family, history, and the slave trade. University of Virginia Press. ISBN 978-0813940397.
