= 14th United States Congress =

1815–1817 legislative term

←	13th	15th	→
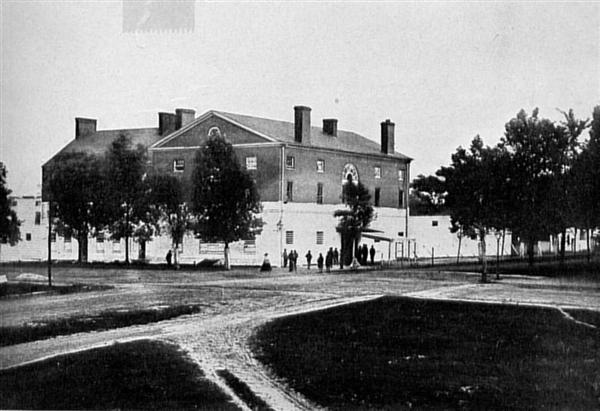
- The Old Brick Capitol, the temporary Capitol while the U.S. Capitol was being renovated after the Burning of Washington. (pictured here around 1861 in use as a Civil War prison)

Overview
- Legislative body: United States Congress
- Jurisdiction: United States
- Term: March 4, 1815 – March 3, 1817

Senate
- Members: 38
- President: Vacant (Note: President pro tempore John Gaillard acted his duties as the President of the Senate.)
- President pro tempore: John Gaillard (DR)
- Party control: Democratic-Republican

House of Representatives
- Members: 183 representatives 4 non-voting delegates
- Speaker: Henry Clay (DR)
- Party control: Democratic-Republican

Sessions
- 1st: December 4, 1815 – April 30, 1816
- 2nd: December 2, 1816 – March 3, 1817

The 14th United States Congress was a meeting of the legislative branch of the United States federal government, consisting of the United States Senate and the United States House of Representatives. It met in the Old Brick Capitol in Washington, D.C. from March 4, 1815, to March 3, 1817, during the seventh and eighth years of James Madison's presidency. The apportionment of seats in the House of Representatives was based on the 1810 United States census. Both chambers had a Democratic-Republican majority.

== Major events ==
- November 1816: James Monroe defeated Rufus King in the U.S. presidential election.

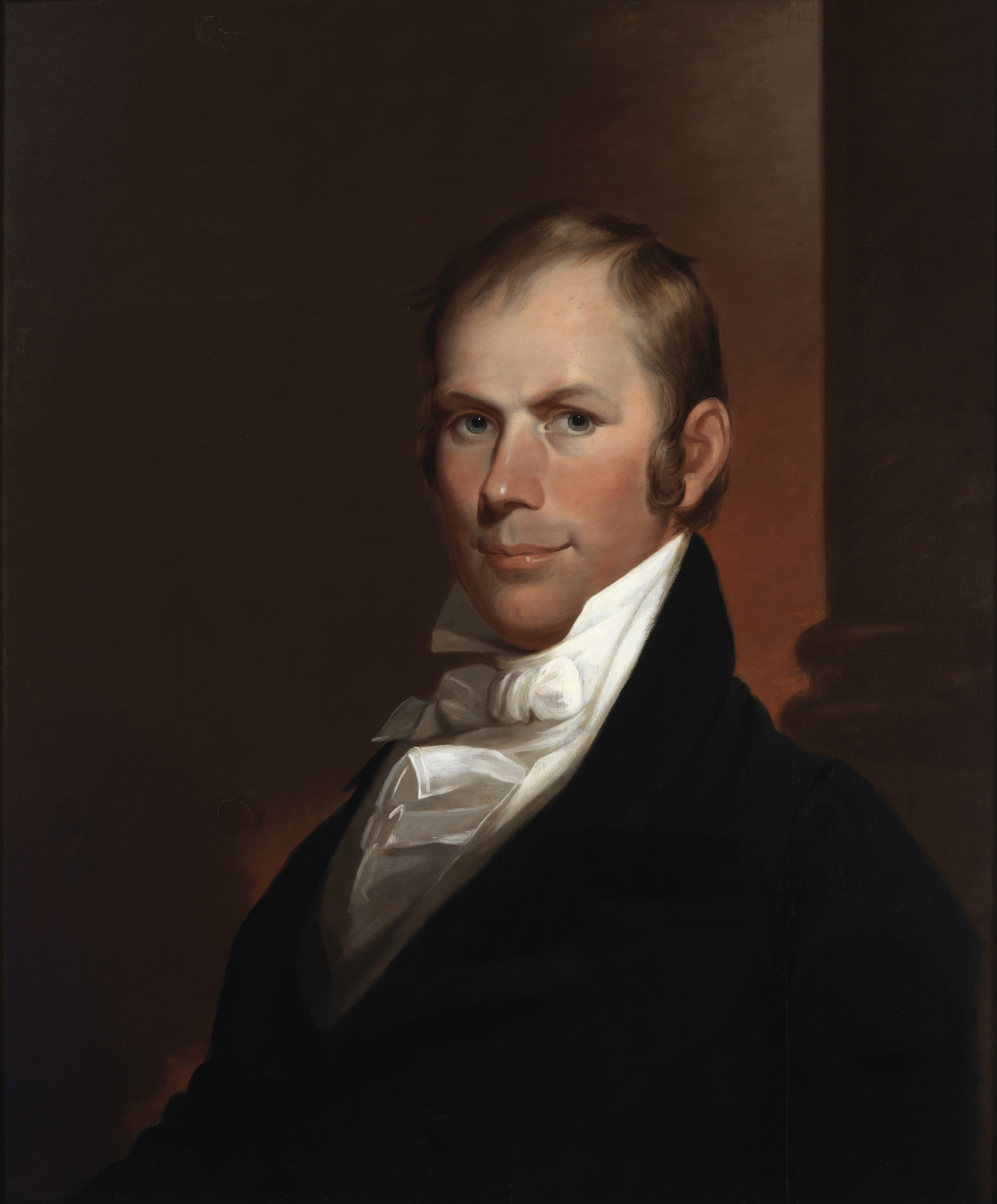
Speaker of the House Henry Clay

- According to abolitionist Jesse Torrey, "One of the members of the house of representatives (Mr. ADGATE,) related to me, while at Washington, the following fact: — "That during the last session of congress, (1815–16,) as several members were standing in the street, near the new capitol, a drove of manacled coloured people were passing by; and when just opposite one of them elevating his manacles as high as he could reach, commenced singing the favorite national song, 'Hail Columbia! happy land!' &c."

== Major legislation ==
- April 10, 1816: Establishment of the Second Bank of the United States
- April 27, 1816: Dallas tariff

=== Proposed, but not enacted ===
- March 3, 1817: Bonus Bill of 1817 (vetoed)

== Treaties ==
- August 24, 1816: Treaty of St. Louis signed

== States admitted and territories organized ==
- December 11, 1816: Indiana was admitted as the 19th state, 3 Stat. 399
- March 3, 1817: Alabama Territory was created from a portion of the Mississippi Territory

== Party summary ==
The count below identifies party affiliations at the beginning of the first session of this congress. Changes resulting from subsequent replacements are shown below in the "Changes in membership" section.

=== Senate ===
During this congress, two Senate seats were added for the new state of Indiana.

	Party (shading shows control)		Total	Vacant
	Democratic- Republican (DR)	Federalist (F)	Total	Vacant
End of previous congress	25	10	35	1
Begin	22	11	33	3
End	25	13	38	0
Final voting share	65.8%	34.2%		
Beginning of next congress	25	13	38	0

=== House of Representatives ===
During this congress, one House seat was added for the new state of Indiana.

	Party (shading shows control)		Total	Vacant
	Democratic- Republican (DR)	Federalist (F)	Total	Vacant
End of previous congress	115	67	182	0
Begin	114	63	177	5
End	119	63	182	1
Final voting share	65.4%	34.6%		
Beginning of next congress	142	38	180	3

== Leadership ==
=== Senate ===
- President: Vacant
- President pro tempore: John Gaillard (DR) of South Carolina, first elected December 4, 1815

=== House of Representatives ===
- Speaker: Henry Clay (DR) of Kentucky

== Members ==
This list is arranged by chamber, then by state. Senators are listed by class and representatives are listed by district.

Skip to House of Representatives, below

=== Senate ===
Senators were elected by the state legislatures every two years, with one-third beginning new six-year terms with each Congress. Preceding the names in the list below are Senate class numbers, which indicate the cycle of their election. In this Congress, Class 1 meant their term began with this Congress, requiring re-election in 1820; Class 2 meant their term ended with this Congress, requiring re-election in 1816; and Class 3 meant their term began in the last Congress, requiring re-election in 1818.

==== Connecticut ====
▌1. Samuel W. Dana (F)
▌3. David Daggett (F)

==== Delaware ====
▌1. Outerbridge Horsey (F)
▌2. William H. Wells (F)

==== Georgia ====
▌2. William W. Bibb (DR), until November 9, 1816

▌George Troup (DR), from November 13, 1816

▌3. Charles Tait (DR)

==== Indiana ====
▌1. James Noble (DR), from December 11, 1816
▌3. Waller Taylor (DR), from December 11, 1816

==== Kentucky ====
▌2. William T. Barry (DR), until May 1, 1816

▌Martin D. Hardin (F), from November 13, 1816

▌3. Isham Talbot (DR)

==== Louisiana ====
▌2. James Brown (DR)
▌3. Eligius Fromentin (DR)

==== Maryland ====
▌1. Robert Goodloe Harper (F), January 1816 – December 1816

▌Alexander C. Hanson (F), from December 20, 1816

▌3. Robert Henry Goldsborough (F)

==== Massachusetts ====
▌1. Christopher Gore (F), until May 30, 1816

▌Eli P. Ashmun (F), from June 12, 1816

▌2. Joseph Bradley Varnum (DR)

==== New Hampshire ====
▌2. Thomas W. Thompson (F)
▌3. Jeremiah Mason (F)

==== New Jersey ====
▌1. James J. Wilson (DR)
▌2. John Condit (DR)

==== New York ====
▌1. Nathan Sanford (DR)
▌3. Rufus King (F)

==== North Carolina ====
▌2. James Turner (DR), until November 21, 1816

▌Montfort Stokes (DR), from December 4, 1816

▌3. Francis Locke Jr. (DR), until December 5, 1815

▌Nathaniel Macon (DR), from December 13, 1815

==== Ohio ====
▌1. Benjamin Ruggles (DR)
▌3. Jeremiah Morrow (DR)

==== Pennsylvania ====
▌1. Jonathan Roberts (DR)
▌3. Abner Lacock (DR)

==== Rhode Island ====
▌1. William Hunter (F)
▌2. Jeremiah B. Howell (DR)

==== South Carolina ====
▌2. John Taylor (DR), until November 1816

▌William Smith (DR), from December 4, 1816

▌3. John Gaillard (DR)

==== Tennessee ====
▌1. George W. Campbell (DR), from October 10, 1815
▌2. Jesse Wharton (DR), until October 10, 1815

▌John Williams (DR), from October 10, 1815

==== Vermont ====
▌1. Isaac Tichenor (F)
▌3. Dudley Chase (DR)

==== Virginia ====
▌1. James Barbour (DR)
▌2. Armistead Thomson Mason (DR), from January 3, 1816

Senators' party membership by state at the opening of the 14th Congress in March 1815. Indiana's senators were not seated until December 11, 1816. 2 Democratic-Republicans 1 Democratic-Republican and 1 Federalist 2 Federalists

=== House of Representatives ===
==== Connecticut ====
All representatives were elected statewide on a general ticket.

▌At-large. Epaphroditus Champion (F)
▌At-large. John Davenport (F)
▌At-large. Lyman Law (F)
▌At-large. Jonathan O. Moseley (F)
▌At-large. Timothy Pitkin (F)
▌At-large. Lewis B. Sturges (F)
▌At-large. Benjamin Tallmadge (F)

==== Delaware ====
Both representatives were elected statewide on a general ticket.

▌At-large. Thomas Clayton (F)
▌At-large. Thomas Cooper (F)

==== Georgia ====
All representatives were elected statewide on a general ticket.

▌At-large. Alfred Cuthbert (DR), until November 9, 1816

▌Zadock Cook (DR), from December 2, 1816

▌At-large. John Forsyth (DR)
▌At-large. Bolling Hall (DR)
▌At-large. Wilson Lumpkin (DR)
▌At-large. Thomas Telfair (DR)
▌At-large. Richard Henry Wilde (DR)

==== Indiana ====
▌At-large. William Hendricks (DR), from December 11, 1816 (newly admitted state)

==== Kentucky ====
▌1. James Clark (DR), until August 1816

▌Thomas Fletcher (DR), from December 2, 1816

▌2. Henry Clay (DR), from October 30, 1815
▌3. Richard Mentor Johnson (DR)
▌4. Joseph Desha (DR)
▌5. Alney McLean (DR)
▌6. Solomon P. Sharp (DR)
▌7. Samuel McKee (DR)
▌8. Stephen Ormsby (DR)
▌9. Micah Taul (DR)
▌10. Benjamin Hardin (DR)

==== Louisiana ====
▌At-large. Thomas B. Robertson (DR)

==== Maryland ====
The 5th district was a plural district with two representatives.

▌1. Philip Stuart (F)
▌2. John C. Herbert (F)
▌3. Alexander C. Hanson (F), until ????, 1816

▌George Peter (F), from October 7, 1816

▌4. George Baer Jr. (F)
▌5. Nicholas R. Moore (DR), until ????, 1815

▌Samuel Smith (DR), from February 4, 1816

▌5. William Pinkney (DR), until April 18, 1816

▌Peter Little (DR), from December 2, 1816

▌6. Stevenson Archer (DR)
▌7. Robert Wright (DR)
▌8. Charles Goldsborough (F)

==== Massachusetts ====
▌1. Artemas Ward Jr. (F)
▌2. Timothy Pickering (F)
▌3. Jeremiah Nelson (F)
▌4. Asahel Stearns (F)
▌5. Elijah H. Mills (F)
▌6. Samuel Taggart (F)
▌7. John W. Hulbert (F)
▌8. William Baylies (F)
▌9. John Reed Jr. (F)
▌10. Laban Wheaton (F)
▌11. Elijah Brigham (F), until February 22, 1816

▌Benjamin Adams (F), from December 2, 1816

▌12. Solomon Strong (F)
▌13. Nathaniel Ruggles (F)
▌14. Cyrus King (F)
▌15. George Bradbury (F)
▌16. Benjamin Brown (F)
▌17. James Carr (F)
▌18. Thomas Rice (F)
▌19. Samuel S. Conner (DR)
▌20. Albion K. Parris (DR)

==== New Hampshire ====
All representatives were elected statewide on a general ticket.

▌At-large. Charles H. Atherton (F)
▌At-large. Bradbury Cilley (F)
▌At-large. William Hale (F)
▌At-large. Roger Vose (F)
▌At-large. Daniel Webster (F)
▌At-large. Jeduthun Wilcox (F)

==== New Jersey ====
All representatives were elected statewide on a general ticket.

▌At-large. Ezra Baker (DR)
▌At-large. Ephraim Bateman (DR)
▌At-large. Benjamin Bennet (DR)
▌At-large. Lewis Condict (DR)
▌At-large. Henry Southard (DR)
▌At-large. Thomas Ward (DR)

==== New York ====
There were six plural districts, the 1st, 2nd, 12th, 15th, 20th & 21st, each had two representatives.

▌1. Henry Crocheron (DR)
▌1. George Townsend (DR)
▌2. William Irving (DR)
▌2. Peter H. Wendover (DR)
▌3. Jonathan Ward (DR)
▌4. Abraham H. Schenck (DR)
▌5. Thomas P. Grosvenor (F)
▌6. Jonathan Fisk (DR), until March ????, 1815

▌James W. Wilkin (DR), from December 4, 1815

▌7. Samuel Betts (DR)
▌8. Erastus Root (DR), from December 26, 1815
▌9. John Lovett (F)
▌10. Hosea Moffitt (F)
▌11. John W. Taylor (DR)
▌12. Asa Adgate (DR), from December 7, 1815
▌12. John Savage (DR)
▌13. John B. Yates (DR)
▌14. Daniel Cady (F)
▌15. James Birdsall (DR)
▌15. Jabez Delano Hammond (DR)
▌16. Thomas R. Gold (F)
▌17. Westel Willoughby Jr. (DR), from December 13, 1815
▌18. Moss Kent (F)
▌19. Victory Birdseye (DR)
▌20. Oliver C. Comstock (DR)
▌20. Enos T. Throop (DR), until June 4, 1816

▌Daniel Avery (DR), from December 3, 1816

▌21. Micah Brooks (DR),
▌21. Peter Buell Porter (DR), until January 23, 1816

▌Archibald S. Clarke (DR), from December 2, 1816

==== North Carolina ====
▌1. William H. Murfree (DR)
▌2. Joseph Hunter Bryan (DR)
▌3. James West Clark (DR)
▌4. William Gaston (F)
▌5. William R. King (DR), until November 4, 1816

▌Charles Hooks (DR), from December 2, 1816

▌6. Nathaniel Macon (DR), until December 13, 1815

▌Weldon Nathaniel Edwards (DR), from February 7, 1816

▌7. John Culpepper (F)
▌8. Richard Stanford (DR), until April 9, 1816

▌Samuel Dickens (DR), from December 2, 1816

▌9. Bartlett Yancey (DR)
▌10. William Carter Love (DR)
▌11. Daniel Munroe Forney (DR)
▌12. Israel Pickens (DR)
▌13. Lewis Williams (DR)

==== Ohio ====
▌1. John McLean (DR), until ????, 1816

▌William Henry Harrison (DR), from December 2, 1816

▌2. John Alexander (DR)
▌3. William Creighton Jr. (DR)
▌4. James Caldwell (DR)
▌5. James Kilbourne (DR)
▌6. David Clendenin (DR)

==== Pennsylvania ====
There were six plural districts, the 2nd, 3rd, 5th, 6th & 10th had two representatives each, the 1st had four representatives.

▌1. Joseph Hopkinson (F)
▌1. William Milnor (F)
▌1. Thomas Smith (F)
▌1. Jonathan Williams (DR), until May 16, 1815

▌John Sergeant (F), from December 6, 1815

▌2. William Darlington (DR)
▌2. John Hahn (DR)
▌3. James M. Wallace (DR), from October 10, 1815
▌3. John Whiteside (DR)
▌4. Hugh Glasgow (DR)
▌5. William Crawford (DR)
▌5. William Maclay (DR)
▌6. Samuel D. Ingham (DR)
▌6. John Ross (DR)
▌7. Joseph Hiester (DR)
▌8. William Piper (DR)
▌9. David Bard (DR), until March 12, 1815

▌Thomas Burnside (DR), from December 11, 1815, until April ????, 1816
▌William Plunkett Maclay (DR), from December 3, 1816

▌10. Jared Irwin (DR)
▌10. William Wilson (DR)
▌11. William Findley (DR)
▌12. Aaron Lyle (DR)
▌13. Isaac Griffin (DR)
▌14. John Woods (F)
▌15. Thomas Wilson (DR)

==== Rhode Island ====
Both representatives were elected statewide on a general ticket.

▌At-large. John L. Boss Jr. (F)
▌At-large. James B. Mason (F)

==== South Carolina ====
▌1. Henry Middleton (DR)
▌2. William Lowndes (DR)
▌3. Benjamin Huger (F)
▌4. John J. Chappell (DR)
▌5. William Woodward (DR)
▌6. John C. Calhoun (DR)
▌7. John Taylor (DR)
▌8. Thomas Moore (DR)
▌9. William Mayrant (DR), until October 21, 1816

▌Stephen Decatur Miller (DR), from January 2, 1817

==== Tennessee ====
▌1. Samuel Powell (DR)
▌2. John Sevier (DR), until September 24, 1815

▌William Grainger Blount (DR), from January 8, 1816

▌3. Isaac Thomas (DR)
▌4. Bennett H. Henderson (DR)
▌5. Newton Cannon (DR)
▌6. James B. Reynolds (DR)

==== Vermont ====
All representatives were elected statewide on a general ticket.

▌At-large. Daniel Chipman (F), until May 5, 1816
▌At-large. Luther Jewett (F)
▌At-large. Chauncey Langdon (F)
▌At-large. Asa Lyon (F)
▌At-large. Charles Marsh (F)
▌At-large. John Noyes (F)

==== Virginia ====
▌1. John G. Jackson (DR)
▌2. Magnus Tate (F)
▌3. Henry St. George Tucker (DR)
▌4. William McCoy (DR)
▌5. James Breckinridge (F)
▌6. Daniel Sheffey (F)
▌7. Ballard Smith (DR)
▌8. Joseph Lewis Jr. (F)
▌9. John P. Hungerford (DR)
▌10. Aylett Hawes (DR)
▌11. Philip P. Barbour (DR)
▌12. William H. Roane (DR)
▌13. Burwell Bassett (DR)
▌14. William A. Burwell (DR)
▌15. Matthew Clay (DR), until May 27, 1815

▌John Kerr (DR), from December 5, 1815

▌16. John Randolph (DR)
▌17. James Pleasants (DR)
▌18. Thomas Gholson Jr. (DR), until July 4, 1816

▌Thomas M. Nelson (DR), from December 6, 1816

▌19. Peterson Goodwyn (DR)
▌20. James Johnson (DR)
▌21. Thomas Newton Jr. (DR)
▌22. Hugh Nelson (DR)
▌23. John Clopton (DR), until September 11, 1816

▌John Tyler (DR), from December 17, 1816

==== Non-voting members ====
Illinois Territory. Benjamin Stephenson

Nathaniel Pope

Indiana Territory. Jonathan Jennings, until December 11, 1816
Mississippi Territory. William Lattimore
Missouri Territory. Rufus Easton, until August 5, 1816

John Scott, August 6, 1816 – January 13, 1817

== Changes in membership ==
The count below reflects changes from the beginning of the first session of this Congress.

=== Senate ===
Senate changes
State (class)	Vacated by	Reason for change	Successor	Date of successor's formal installation (Note: When seated or oath administered, not necessarily when service began.)
Tennessee (1)	Vacant	For unknown reasons, a Senator was not elected until after the term began. Winner elected October 10, 1815.	George W. Campbell (DR)	Took seat October 10, 1815
Tennessee (2)	Jesse Wharton (DR)	Appointee was not elected to finish the term. Successor elected October 10, 1815.	John Williams (DR)	Seated October 10, 1815
North Carolina (3)	Francis Locke Jr.	Resigned when successor was elected, having never qualified. Successor elected December 5, 1815 to finish term.	Nathaniel Macon (DR)	Seated December 13, 1815
Virginia (2)	Vacant	Resignation of William B. Giles (DR) in the previous congress. Successor elected January 3, 1816 to finish the term.	Armistead Thomson Mason (DR)	Took seat January 3, 1816
Maryland (1)	Vacant	Legislature failed to elect in time for the term. Successor elected January 29, 1816 for the term.	Robert G. Harper (F)	Took seat January 29, 1816
Kentucky (2)	William T. Barry (DR)	Resigned May 1, 1816 after being appointed to a judicial position. Successor appointed November 13, 1816, to continue the term and then finished the term either by special election or by the appointment.	Martin D. Hardin (F)	Seated November 13, 1816
Massachusetts (1)	Christopher Gore (F)	Resigned May 30, 1816. Successor elected June 12, 1816, to finish the term.	Eli P. Ashmun (F)	Seated June 12, 1816
South Carolina (2)	John Taylor (DR)	Resigned November 1816. Successor elected December 4, 1816, to finish the term.	William Smith (DR)	Seated December 4, 1816
Georgia (2)	William W. Bibb (DR)	Resigned November 9, 1816 after being appointed Governor of Alabama Territory. Successor elected November 13, 1816, to finish the term, having already been elected to the next term.	George Troup (DR)	Seated November 13, 1816
North Carolina (2)	James Turner (DR)	Resigned November 21, 1816 due to ill health. Successor elected December 4, 1816, to finish the term.	Montfort Stokes (DR)	Seated December 4, 1816
Maryland (1)	Robert Goodloe Harper (F)	Resigned December 6, 1816. Successor elected December 20, 1816, to finish the term.	Alexander C. Hanson (F)	Seated December 20, 1816
Indiana (1)	New seats	Indiana was admitted to the Union on December 11, 1816.	James Noble (DR)	Seated December 11, 1816
Indiana (3)	New seats	Indiana was admitted to the Union on December 11, 1816.	Waller Taylor (DR)	Seated December 11, 1816

=== House of Representatives ===
House changes
District	Vacated by	Reason for change	Successor	Date of successor's formal installation
New York 12	Vacant	Member-elect Benjamin Pond died during previous congress	Asa Adgate (DR)	December 7, 1815
Pennsylvania 3	Vacant	Amos Ellmaker resigned on July 3, 1815, upon State appointment as judge	James M. Wallace (DR)	December 4, 1815
Kentucky 2	Vacant	Seat declared vacant by the governor, “caused by the acceptance of Henry Clay to sign a commercial convention as Minister Plenipotentiary to Great Britain”, but Clay was elected to fill his own vacancy	Henry Clay (DR)	December 4, 1815
New York 17	Vacant	Credentials for incumbent William S. Smith (F) were issued by the Secretary of State of New York, but Smith did not take or claim the seat, contested by Willoughby Jr.	Westel Willoughby Jr. (DR)	December 13, 1815
New York 8	Vacant	Credentials for John Adams (F) were issued by the Secretary of State of New York, but Adams did not take or claim the seat, contested by Root	Erastus Root (DR)	December 26, 1815
Maryland 5	Nicholas R. Moore (DR)	Resigned sometime in 1815 before Congress convened	Samuel Smith (DR)	February 4, 1816
New York 6	Jonathan Fisk (DR)	Resigned sometime in March, 1815, upon appointment as United States Attorney for the Southern District of New York	James W. Wilkin (DR)	December 4, 1815
Pennsylvania 9	David Bard (DR)	Died March 12, 1815	Thomas Burnside (DR)	December 11, 1815
Pennsylvania 1	Jonathan Williams (DR)	Died May 16, 1815	John Sergeant (F)	December 6, 1815
Virginia 15	Matthew Clay (DR)	Died May 27, 1815	John Kerr (DR)	December 5, 1815
Tennessee 2	John Sevier (DR)	Died September 24, 1815	William Grainger Blount (DR)	January 8, 1816
North Carolina 6	Nathaniel Macon (DR)	Resigned December 13, 1815, after being elected to the U.S. Senate	Weldon Nathaniel Edwards (DR)	February 7, 1816
Maryland 3	Alexander C. Hanson (F)	Resigned sometime in 1816	George Peter (F)	October 7, 1816
Ohio 1	John McLean (DR)	Resigned sometime in 1816	William Henry Harrison (DR)	December 2, 1816
New York 21	Peter Buell Porter (DR)	Resigned January 23, 1816	Archibald S. Clarke (DR)	December 2, 1816
Massachusetts 11	Elijah Brigham (F)	Died February 22, 1816	Benjamin Adams (F)	December 2, 1816
Pennsylvania 9	Thomas Burnside (DR)	Resigned April, 1816	William Plunkett Maclay (DR)	December 3, 1816
North Carolina 8	Richard Stanford (DR)	Died April 9, 1816	Samuel Dickens (DR)	December 2, 1816
Maryland 5	William Pinkney (DR)	Resigned April 18, 1816, upon appointment as Minister Plenipotentiary to Russia	Peter Little (DR)	December 2, 1816
Vermont at-large	Daniel Chipman (F)	Resigned May 5, 1816	Vacant until next Congress	
New York 20	Enos T. Throop (DR)	Resigned June 4, 1816	Daniel Avery (DR)	December 3, 1816
Virginia 18	Thomas Gholson Jr. (DR)	Died July 4, 1816	Thomas M. Nelson (DR)	December 4, 1816
Kentucky 1	James Clark (DR)	Resigned sometime in August, 1816	Thomas Fletcher (DR)	December 2, 1816
Missouri Territory at-large	Rufus Easton	Served throughout the first session; Scott presented credentials at the beginning of the second session and was contested by Easton	John Scott	December 2, 1816
Illinois Territory at-large	Benjamin Stephenson	Term ended September 3, 1816	Nathaniel Pope	December 2, 1816
Virginia 23	John Clopton (DR)	Died September 11, 1816	John Tyler (DR)	December 17, 1816
South Carolina 9	William Mayrant (DR)	Resigned October 21, 1816	Stephen Decatur Miller (DR)	January 2, 1817
North Carolina 5	William R. King (DR)	Resigned November 4, 1816	Charles Hooks (DR)	December 2, 1816
Georgia at-large	Alfred Cuthbert (DR)	Resigned November 9, 1816	Zadock Cook (DR)	January 23, 1817
Indiana Territory at-large	Jonathan Jennings (Territorial delegate)	Indiana was admitted to the Union on December 11, 1816	William Hendricks (DR)	December 11, 1816
Missouri Territory at-large	John Scott	His election was contested by his predecessor Easton. On January 13, 1817, the election was declared illegal, but the seat was declared vacant.	Vacant until next Congress	

== Committees ==
Lists of committees and their party leaders.

=== Senate ===
- Attorney General's Office (Select)
- Audit and Control the Contingent Expenses of the Senate (Chairman: Abner Lacock)
- Claims (Chairman: Jonathan Roberts)
- Commerce and Manufactures (Chairman: William Hunter)
- Compensation of Members of Congress (Select)
- District of Columbia (Chairman: Armistead Mason)
- Engrossed Bills (Chairman: Eligius Fromentin)
- Finance (Select)
- Indiana Admission to the Union (Select)
- Judiciary (Chairman: Dudley Chase)
- Military Affairs (Chairman: John Williams)
- Militia (Chairman: Joseph Varnum)
- Memorial of the Mississippi Territory (Chairman: N/A)
- National University (Chairman: N/A)
- Naval Affairs (Chairman: Charles Tait)
- Pensions (Chairman: Jeremiah Howell)
- Post Office and Post Roads (Chairman: James J. Wilson)
- Public Lands (Chairman: Jeremiah Morrow)
- Slave Trade (Select)
- Weights and Measures (Select)
- Whole

=== House of Representatives ===
- Accounts (Chairman: John McLean then Peter Little)
- Assent of Congress to an Act of the Virginia Legislature (Select)
- Attorney General's Office (Select)
- Banks of the District of Columbia (Select)
- Berkshire Association (Select)
- Bible Society of Philadelphia (Select)
- Bonus of the National Banks (Select)
- Bounty Lands Communication (Select)
- Claims (Chairman: Bartlett Yancey)
- Commerce and Manufactures (Chairman: Thomas Newton Jr.)
- District of Columbia (Chairman: Henry S. Tucker)
- Elections (Chairman: John W. Taylor)
- Expenditures in the Navy Department (Chairman: Stevenson Archer)
- Expenditures in the Post Office Department (Chairman: Newton Cannon)
- Expenditures in the State Department (Chairman: John B. Yates)
- Expenditures in the Treasury Department (Chairman: Samuel Smith)
- Expenditures in the War Department (Chairman: Erastus Root)
- Expenditures on Public Buildings (Chairman: Lewis Condict)
- Judiciary (Chairman: Hugh Nelson)
- Pensions and Revolutionary Claims (Chairman: John J. Chappell)
- Post Office and Post Roads (Chairman: Samuel D. Ingham)
- Private Land Claims (Chairman: Solomon P. Sharp)
- Public Expenditures (Chairman: William H. Murfree then Israel Pickens)
- Public Lands (Chairman: Thomas B. Robertson)
- Revisal and Unfinished Business (Chairman: Lewis Condict)
- Rules (Select)
- Standards of Official Conduct
- Ways and Means (Chairman: William Lowndes)
- Whole

=== Joint committees ===
- Enrolled Bills

== Employees ==
=== Legislative branch agency directors ===
- Architect of the Capitol: Benjamin Latrobe, from April 6, 1815
- Librarian of Congress: George Watterston

=== Senate ===
- Chaplain: Jesse Lee (Methodist), until December 8, 1815
  - John Glendie (Presbyterian), elected December 8, 1815
  - Sereno Edwards Dwight, (Congregationalist) elected December 16, 1816
- Secretary: Charles Cutts
- Sergeant at Arms: Mountjoy Bayly

=== House of Representatives ===
- Chaplain: Obadiah B. Brown (Baptist), until December 7, 1815
  - Spencer H. Cone (Baptist), December 7, 1815 – December 2, 1816
  - Burgiss Allison (Baptist), elected December 2, 1816
- Clerk: Thomas Dougherty
- Doorkeeper: Thomas Claxton
- Sergeant at Arms: Thomas Dunn

== See also ==
- 1814 United States elections (elections leading to this Congress)
  - 1814–15 United States Senate elections
  - 1814–15 United States House of Representatives elections
- 1816 United States elections (elections during this Congress, leading to the next Congress)
  - 1816 United States presidential election
  - 1816–17 United States Senate elections
  - 1816–17 United States House of Representatives elections
