= Portrait of Miss Ada Calhoun =

1867 painting by Franz Xaver Winterhalter

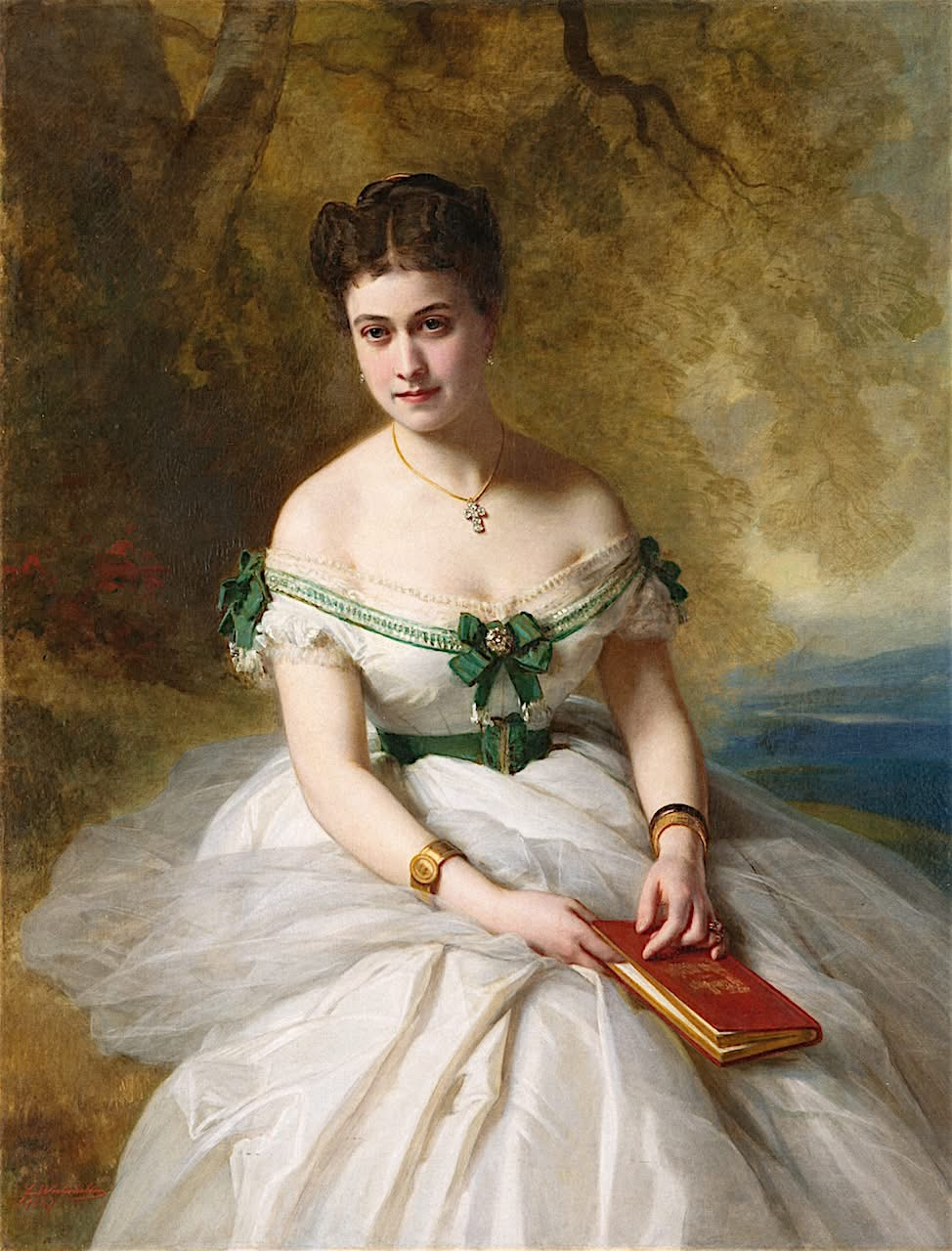
- Artist: Franz Xaver Winterhalter
- Year: 1867
- Medium: oil on canvas
- Dimensions: 116 cm × 90 cm (46 in × 35 in)
- Location: Private collection

Portrait of Miss Ada Calhoun is an oil painting made in January 1867 by European court painter Franz Xaver Winterhalter depicting American plantation heiress Marie Margaret Ada Calhoun, later Ada Calhoun Lane. Calhoun was the daughter of Meredith Calhoun, who owned vast plantations and well over 1,000 slaves in Louisiana and Alabama, but had lived in France almost full-time beginning in 1842. In 2016, the portrait of Ada Calhoun was the only image of an American included in the traveling exhibit High Society: The Portraits of Franz X. Winterhalter. The painting apparently hung at Abingdon Place in Huntsville, Alabama in 1895, at which time it was witness to a dinner honoring suffragists Susan B. Anthony and Carrie Chapman Catt, who had been invited to town to speak on the topic of votes for women.

== Sources ==
- Keith, LeeAnna (2008). The Colfax Massacre: The Untold Story of Black Power, White Terror, and the Death of Reconstruction. New York: Oxford University Press. ISBN 978-0-19-531026-9. LCCN 2007023368. OCLC 191027904.
