= James Blair (South Carolina politician) =

American politician (1786–1834)

Member of the U.S. House of Representatives from South Carolina's 8th district
- In office March 4, 1829 – April 1, 1834
- Preceded by: John Carter
- Succeeded by: Richard Irvine Manning I

Member of the U.S. House of Representatives from South Carolina's 9th district
- In office March 4, 1821 – May 8, 1822
- Preceded by: Joseph Brevard
- Succeeded by: John Carter

Personal details
- Born: September 26, 1786 Waxhaws, Lancaster County, South Carolina
- Died: April 1, 1834 (aged 47) Washington, D.C.
- Resting place: Congressional Cemetery, Washington, D.C.
- Party: Jacksonian Democratic-Republican (until 1825)
- Other political affiliations: Jacksonian (after 1825)
- Occupation: planter

James Blair (September 26, 1786 – April 1, 1834) was a United States representative from South Carolina. He was born in the Waxhaw settlement, Lancaster County, South Carolina to Sarah Douglass and William Blair, immigrants from Ireland. He engaged in planting and was also the sheriff of Lancaster District. He owned slaves.

Blair was elected as a Democratic-Republican to the Seventeenth Congress and served from March 4, 1821, to May 8, 1822, when he resigned. He was elected as a Jacksonian to the Twenty-first through Twenty-third Congresses and served from March 4, 1829, until his death in Washington, D.C., on April 1, 1834.

Under date of December 24, 1833, John Quincy Adams records in his diary that Blair "had knocked down and very severely beaten Duff Green, editor of the Telegraph..." He paid "three hundred dollars fine for beating and breaking the bones" of Green. Adams subsequently characterized Blair as "... an honest and very intelligent man ruined by the habits of intemperance and maddended with opium."

Under date of April 2, 1834, Adams records in his diary that Blair "shot himself last evening at his lodgings ... after reading part of an affectionate letter from his wife, to Governor Murphy, of Alabama who was alone in the chamber with him, and a fellow-lodger at the same house." He was buried in Congressional Cemetery; his tombstone inscription includes his command as General of the South Carolina 5th Militia Brigade.

== See also ==
- List of members of the United States Congress who died in office (1790–1899)

U.S. House of Representatives
Preceded by Joseph Brevard	Member of the U.S. House of Representatives from South Carolina's 9th congressional district 1821–1822	Succeeded by John Carter
Preceded by John Carter	Member of the U.S. House of Representatives from South Carolina's 8th congressional district 1829–1834	Succeeded by Richard Manning
