= John Kershaw (American politician) =

American politician (1765–1829)

Member of the U.S. House of Representatives from South Carolina's 9th district
- In office March 4, 1813 – March 3, 1815
- Preceded by: District established
- Succeeded by: William Mayrant

Chairman of the Committee on Accounts
- In office March 4, 1813 – March 3, 1815

Member of the South Carolina House of Representatives
- In office 1800 – 1801
- In office 1792 – 1794

Personal details
- Born: September 12, 1765 Camden, Province of South Carolina, British America
- Died: August 4, 1829 (aged 63) Camden, South Carolina, U.S.
- Party: Democratic-Republican
- Spouse: Harriet DuBose
- Education: United States Military Academy
- Profession: planter

Military service
- Allegiance: United States of America
- Branch/service: United States Army
- Rank: captain
- Unit: South Carolina Light Dragoons

John Kershaw (September 12, 1765 – August 4, 1829) was a U.S. representative from South Carolina.

Born in Camden in the Province of South Carolina, Kershaw attended Rushworth School and Oxford College, England where he studied law. He was the son of Joseph Kershaw, one of the founders of Camden, SC. He married Harriet DuBose in 1812. They were the parents of Major General Joseph Brevard Kershaw, a noted Confederate Army officer.

== Early years ==
He was admitted to the bar and commenced practice in Camden, South Carolina. Kershaw engaged in planting and wheat milling and was a tobacco inspector in 1789. In 1790, he served as a member of the Constitutional Convention and served as Judge of the county court of Kershaw when it was first established in 1791.

== Representative and Mayoral years ==
Kershaw served as member of the State House of Representatives from 1792 to 1794 and again from 1800 to 1801. He served as Mayor of Camden in 1798, 1801, 1811, and 1822. He ran for Congress in the 5th congressional district in 1803, losing to Richard Winn. In 1806, Kershaw served as Justice of Quorum from Kershaw County. He also served as captain of the First South Carolina Light Dragoons.

== US Congress ==
Kershaw was elected from South Carolina's 9th congressional district and served as a Democratic-Republican representative to the Thirteenth Congress (March 4, 1813 – March 3, 1815). Kershaw served as chairman of the Committee on Accounts (Thirteenth Congress).

He was an unsuccessful candidate for re-election in 1814 (to the Fourteenth Congress).

== Death ==
He died in Camden, South Carolina, August 4, 1829 and was interred in the Kershaw family burial ground.

== Sources ==
- United States Congress. "John Kershaw (id: K000149)". Biographical Directory of the United States Congress.

U.S. House of Representatives
Preceded by District established	Member of the U.S. House of Representatives from South Carolina's 9th congressional district 1813-1815	Succeeded by William Mayrant
