= Richard Irvine Manning I =

50th Governor of South Carolina from 1824 to 1826

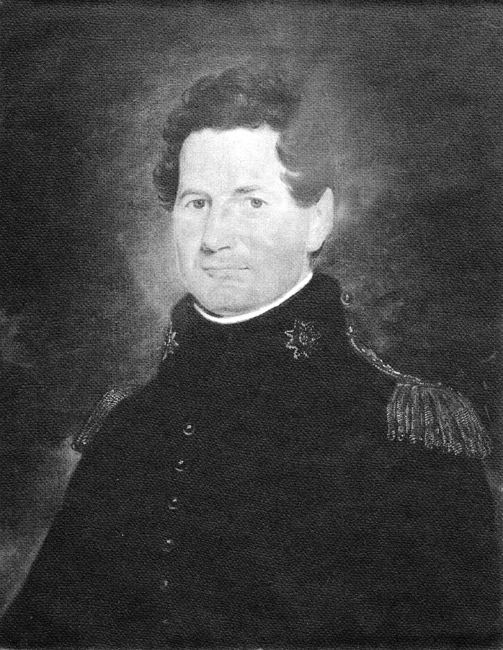

50th Governor of South Carolina
- In office December 3, 1824 – December 9, 1826
- Lieutenant: William A. Bull
- Preceded by: John Lyde Wilson
- Succeeded by: John Taylor

Member of the United States House of Representatives from South Carolina's 8th District
- In office December 8, 1834 – May 1, 1836
- Preceded by: James Blair
- Succeeded by: John Peter Richardson II

Member of the South Carolina Senate from Clarendon District
- In office November 22, 1830 – November 24, 1834

Member of the South Carolina House of Representatives from Clarendon District
- In office November 25, 1822 – December 3, 1824

Personal details
- Born: May 1, 1789 Sumter County, South Carolina, US
- Died: May 1, 1836 (aged 47) Philadelphia, Pennsylvania, US
- Resting place: Columbia, South Carolina, US
- Party: Democratic-Republican
- Other political affiliations: Union Party
- Education: South Carolina College

Military service
- Branch/service: South Carolina militia
- Rank: Captain
- Battles/wars: War of 1812

Richard Irvine Manning I (May 1, 1789 – May 1, 1836) was the 50th governor of South Carolina from 1824 to 1826 and was later a representative in the United States Congress.

== Early life and career ==
Manning was born in the Sumter District and he received his education at the local private schools. He was born to planter class parents, and the first Manning ancestor in America, Charles Manning, arrived to Virginia from Oxfordshire, England in 1683 at the age of 22.

In 1811, Manning graduated from South Carolina College where he was a member of the Clariosophic Society. He served as a captain in the South Carolina militia during the War of 1812. After the war, he engaged in planting on Hickory Hill Plantation in Sumter County. It was there that his son and a future Governor of South Carolina, John Lawrence Manning, was born in 1816.

== Political career ==
In 1822, Manning was elected to the South Carolina House of Representatives and served for one term. Two years later in 1824, the General Assembly elected him as Governor of South Carolina. During his two-year term as governor, Manning advocated the reform of the Negro Laws by pushing for an end of execution by burning and to have capital cases tried by jury at a courthouse.

Upon leaving office in 1826, Manning remained active in politics and participated in the Union Party in opposition to the Nullifier Party. He successfully sought election to the South Carolina Senate and made an unsuccessful run for Congress in 1826 and was also unsuccessful in his bid for another term as governor in 1830. However, Manning won a special election in 1834 as a Jacksonian to fill the seat of the 8th congressional district caused by the death of James Blair. He was re-elected in 1834, but he died in Philadelphia on May 1, 1836 (his 47th birthday) prior to the completion of the term. Manning was interred at the Trinity Episcopal churchyard in Columbia.

== See also ==
- List of members of the United States Congress who died in office (1790–1899)

Political offices
Preceded by John Lyde Wilson	Governor of South Carolina; 1824–1826	Succeeded by John Taylor
U.S. House of Representatives
Preceded by James Blair	Member of the U.S. House of Representatives from South Carolina's 8th congressional district 1834–1835	Succeeded by James Rogers
Preceded by William K. Clowney	Member of the U.S. House of Representatives from South Carolina's 7th congressional district 1835–1836	Succeeded by John Peter Richardson II
