= William Lowndes (South Carolina politician) =

American politician (1782–1822)

William Jones Lowndes
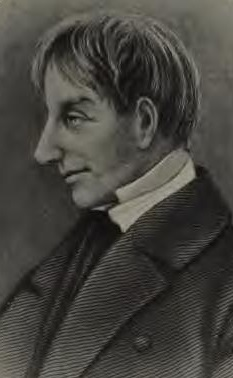
- Frontispiece of 1901's Life and Times of William Lowndes of South Carolina, 1782-1822

Chairman of the House Committee on Ways and Means
- In office 1815–1818
- Preceded by: John W. Eppes
- Succeeded by: Samuel Smith

Member of the U.S. House of Representatives from South Carolina
- In office March 4, 1811 – May 8, 1822
- Preceded by: John Taylor
- Succeeded by: James Hamilton Jr.
- Constituency: 4th district (1811–1813); 2nd district (1813–1822)

Member of the South Carolina House of Representatives from St. Philip's and St. Michael's Parish
- In office November 26, 1804 – December 19, 1807

Personal details
- Born: February 11, 1782 Jacksonboro, South Carolina, U.S.
- Died: October 27, 1822 (aged 40) Atlantic Ocean
- Party: Democratic-Republican
- Spouse: Elizabeth Pinckney
- Profession: Planter, lawyer

William Jones Lowndes (February 11, 1782 – October 27, 1822) was an American lawyer, planter, and politician from South Carolina. He represented the state in the U.S. Congress from 1811 to May 8, 1822, when he resigned for health reasons.

== Early life ==
The son of Rawlins Lowndes (1721–1800), multi-term legislator and briefly governor of South Carolina during the American Revolutionary War, William Lowndes was one of three children born to Rawlins Lowndes' third wife, the former Sarah Jones (1757-1801), daughter of Col. Charles Jones of Georgia.

His paternal grandfather, Charles Lowndes, had moved his family from St. Kitts in the British West Indies in 1730 to South Carolina, but his extravagant spending led to financial ruin. After he committed suicide, his sons Charles and Rawlins were placed in the care of Robert Hall, then the provost-marshal of South Carolina (its chief law enforcement officer). Rawlins Lowndes succeeded Hall in 1745 but resigned for health reasons in 1754. In addition to his legal practice and civic duties, Rawlins Lowndes acquired plantations through marriage, which he farmed using enslaved labor. He acquired his first plantation along the Stono River in St. Paul Parish in 1748 (which qualified him for a seat in the lower house of the South Carolina Assembly), although that wife died in childbirth in 1750. Rawlins Lowndes' second wife, Mary Cartwright Lowndes (1736–1770) bore seven children, including future Congressman Thomas Lowndes before her death. Like his elder half-sibling, William Lowndes received a classical education appropriate to his class in South Carolina and England, then studied law.

In 1802, William Lowndes married Elizabeth Pinckney (1781–1857), daughter of plantation owner and Federalist leader Thomas Pinckney, and they would have son Thomas Pinckney Lowndes (1808–1838) and daughter Rebecca Motte Lowndes Rutledge (1810–1892).

== Career ==
Admitted to the bar in 1804, William Lowndes began his legal practice in Charleston. He also owned several rice plantations on South Carolina's Atlantic coast, which he operated using enslaved labor.

== Politics ==
William J. Lowndes first served in the South Carolina House of Representatives from 1804 to 1808.

Elected to the Twelfth United States Congress as a Representative from the Charleston area, Lowndes was a key member of the 'War Hawk' faction along with Speaker of the House Henry Clay, future President of the Second Bank of the United States Langdon Cheves, Tennessee representative Felix Grundy, and future Vice President and South Carolina Senator John C. Calhoun. The War Hawks agitated throughout the Congressional session for declaration of the War of 1812, which they achieved on June 19. Lowndes roomed at the same boardinghouse as Calhoun in Washington, D.C., and they became close friends; Lowndes's granddaughter, twenty years after his death, stated that Calhoun told his widow "that there had never been a shadow between them."

After the war, Lowndes served as Chairman of the Ways and Means Committee for four years. He authored and shepherded through Congress the Tariff of 1816 in consultation with Secretary of the Treasury Alexander Dallas. He also rose to chairman of the Committee on Expenditures in the Treasury Department. His reputation for financial expertise made Lowndes a chief lieutenant of Calhoun in authorizing the Second Bank of the United States during the Fourteenth Congress. Extremely well-respected by his colleagues and the press, Lowndes was offered several Cabinet positions by both James Madison and his successor James Monroe, including Secretary of Treasury and Secretary of War. When Lowndes refused the latter, it was offered to Calhoun, who accepted the position and held it until his inauguration as Vice President in 1825. According to historians Jeanne and David Heidler, "Admired for his fairness and judicious temperament, Lowndes was frequently mentioned as presidential timber, especially because he seemed immune to ambition. Everybody listened when William Lowndes spoke because he always said something worth hearing."

Staying in the House, Lowndes was a major player in the negotiations surrounding what would become the Missouri Compromise; Southern support for the Compromise was at least partially due to Lowndes's advocacy. William Lowndes also developed the Lowndes Apportionment Method, which would have given more power to smaller states, but could not secure its passage in Congress. In 1821, Lowndes was nominated for President of the United States for the 1824 election by the South Carolina legislature over the more ambitious Calhoun, which impeded Calhoun's own incipient candidacy.

== Death and legacy ==
Perennially ill after an accident in his youth, Lowndes' health took a serious downturn in 1822, and he resigned from Congress. At his wife's urging, the Lowndes family embarked for a recuperative visit to England, but William died en route on October 27, 1822, at the age of 40. He was buried at sea, although a cenotaph in his honor stands at Congressional Cemetery in Washington, D.C.

Following Lowndes' resignation, South Carolina Governor James Hamilton, Jr. replaced him in Congress. During the Nullification Crisis, Hamilton and John C. Calhoun had led the states' forces for Nullification in support of slavery. Lowndes's most recent biographer considers the juxtaposition of these two figures and Lowndes's position as one of the last Southern nationalists a "transition of Southern politics."

In March–April 1824, electors from South Carolina honored William Lowndes posthumously with a single vote at the Democratic-Republican Party caucus, as the party's candidate for the Office of U.S. Vice President for the upcoming election.

As shown by a historical marker, Lowndesville, South Carolina, was named in his honor. Lowndes County, Georgia, was named in his honor in 1825 and Alabama and Mississippi both named counties in his honor in 1830.

U.S. House of Representatives
| Preceded by John Taylor | Member of the U.S. House of Representatives from South Carolina's 4th congressional district 1811–1813 | Succeeded by John J. Chappell |
| Preceded by William Butler | Member of the U.S. House of Representatives from South Carolina's 2nd congressional district 1813–1822 | Succeeded by James Hamilton, Jr. |
