= South Carolina's 9th congressional district =

Obsolete congressional district

- Obsolete district
- Created: 1810
- Eliminated: 1840
- Years active: 1813–1843

South Carolina's 9th congressional district was a congressional district for the United States House of Representatives in South Carolina. It was created in 1813 as a result of the 1810 census and eliminated in 1843 as a result of the 1840 census. The district was last represented by Patrick C. Caldwell.

== List of members representing the district ==
| Member (Residence) | Party | Years | Cong ress | Electoral history | District location |
|---|---|---|---|---|---|
District established March 4, 1813
| John Kershaw (Camden) | Democratic-Republican | March 4, 1813 – March 3, 1815 | 13th | Elected in 1812. Lost re-election. | 1813–1823: "Sumter district" |
| William Mayrant (Stateburg) | Democratic-Republican | March 4, 1815 – October 21, 1816 | 14th | Elected in 1814. Lost re-election and resigned. | 1813–1823: "Sumter district" |
| Vacant | | October 21, 1816 – January 2, 1817 | 14th | | 1813–1823: "Sumter district" |
| Stephen Decatur Miller (Stateburg) | Democratic-Republican | January 2, 1817 – March 3, 1819 | 14th 15th | Elected in 1816. Elected November 25 & 26, 1816 to finish Mayrant's term and seated January 2, 1817. Retired. | 1813–1823: "Sumter district" |
| Joseph Brevard (Camden) | Democratic-Republican | March 4, 1819 – March 3, 1821 | 16th | Elected in 1818. Retired. | 1813–1823: "Sumter district" |
| James Blair (Camden) | Democratic-Republican | March 4, 1821 – May 8, 1822 | 17th | John S. Richards was elected in 1820 but declined to serve. Elected February 5 & 6, 1821 to finish Richards's term. Resigned. | 1813–1823: "Sumter district" |
| Vacant | | May 8, 1822 – December 11, 1822 | 17th | | 1813–1823: "Sumter district" |
| John Carter (Camden) | Democratic-Republican | December 11, 1822 – March 3, 1823 | 17th | Elected in October 1822 to finish Blair's term and seated December 11, 1822. Redistricted to the 8th district. | 1813–1823: "Sumter district" |
| Starling Tucker (Mountain Shoals) | Democratic-Republican (Jackson) | March 4, 1823 – March 3, 1825 | 18th 19th 20th 21st | Redistricted from the 5th district and re-elected in 1823. Re-elected in 1824. Re-elected in 1826. Re-elected in 1828. Retired. | 1823–1833: "Newberry district" |
| Starling Tucker (Mountain Shoals) | Jacksonian | March 4, 1825 – March 3, 1831 | 18th 19th 20th 21st | Redistricted from the 5th district and re-elected in 1823. Re-elected in 1824. Re-elected in 1826. Re-elected in 1828. Retired. | 1823–1833: "Newberry district" |
| John K. Griffin (Newberry) | Nullifier | March 4, 1831 – March 3, 1837 | 22nd 23rd 24th 25th 26th | Elected in 1830. Re-elected in 1833. Re-elected in 1834. Re-elected in 1836. Re-elected in 1838. Retired. | 1823–1833: "Newberry district" |
| John K. Griffin (Newberry) | Nullifier | March 4, 1831 – March 3, 1837 | 22nd 23rd 24th 25th 26th | Elected in 1830. Re-elected in 1833. Re-elected in 1834. Re-elected in 1836. Re-elected in 1838. Retired. | 1833–1843: [data missing] |
| John K. Griffin (Newberry) | Democratic | March 4, 1837 – March 3, 1841 | 22nd 23rd 24th 25th 26th | Elected in 1830. Re-elected in 1833. Re-elected in 1834. Re-elected in 1836. Re-elected in 1838. Retired. | 1833–1843: [data missing] |
| Patrick C. Caldwell (Newberry) | Democratic | March 4, 1841 – March 3, 1843 | 27th | Elected in 1840. Redistricted to the 5th district and lost re-election. | 1833–1843: [data missing] |
District dissolved March 3, 1843
