= John Carter (South Carolina politician) =

American politician

John W. Carter

Member of the U.S. House of Representatives from South Carolina
- In office December 11, 1822 – March 4, 1829
- Preceded by: James Blair (9th); Joseph Gist (8th)
- Succeeded by: Starling Tucker (9th); James Blair (8th)
- Constituency: 9th district (1822-23); 8th district (1823-29)

Personal details
- Born: John W. Carter; September 10, 1792 Camden, South Carolina
- Died: June 20, 1850 (aged 57) Georgetown, District of Columbia
- Party: Jacksonian Democratic-Republican (until 1825)
- Other political affiliations: Jacksonian (after 1825)
- Education: South Carolina College
- Occupation: lawyer

John W. Carter (September 10, 1792 – June 20, 1850) was a U.S. representative from South Carolina.

Born on the Black River, near Camden, in what is now Kershaw County, South Carolina, Carter graduated from South Carolina College (now the University of South Carolina) at Columbia in 1811. He studied law and was admitted to the bar in 1814. He commenced practice in Camden, South Carolina. He served as commissioner in equity from 1814 until 1820.

Carter was elected as a Democratic-Republican to the Seventeenth Congress to fill the vacancy caused by the resignation of James Blair. He was reelected as a Jackson Republican to the Eighteenth Congress and as a Jacksonian to the Nineteenth and the Twentieth Congresses and served from December 11, 1822, to March 3, 1829.

He resumed the practice of law in Camden and moved to Georgetown, D.C., in 1836. He died there on June 20, 1850.

== Sources ==
- United States Congress. "John Carter (id: C000197)". Biographical Directory of the United States Congress.

U.S. House of Representatives
Preceded by James Blair	Member of the U.S. House of Representatives from South Carolina's 9th congressional district 1822–1823	Succeeded by Starling Tucker
Preceded by Joseph Gist	Member of the U.S. House of Representatives from South Carolina's 8th congressional district 1823–1829	Succeeded by James Blair
