= William Mayrant =

American politician

Member of the U.S. House of Representatives from South Carolina's 9th district
- In office March 4, 1815 – October 21, 1816
- Preceded by: John Kershaw
- Succeeded by: Stephen D. Miller

Member of the South Carolina House of Representatives
- In office 1818 – 1821

Personal details
- Born: March 8, 1765 Charleston, Province of South Carolina, British America
- Died: January 23, 1832 (aged 66) Stateburg, South Carolina, U.S.
- Party: Democratic-Republican
- Profession: planter

William Mayrant (March 8, 1765 – January 23, 1832) was a U.S. representative from South Carolina.

William Mayrant was elected in 1814 as a Democratic-Republican to the Fourteenth Congress and served until his resignation on October 21, 1816 (March 4, 1815-October 21, 1816). He was elected to his first and only term as a member of the US House of Representatives, from his home at Stateburg, near what is now Sumter. He represented South Carolina's 9th congressional district. Mayrant voted in favor of the Tariff of 1816, which most southerners opposed because they believed it placed them at a financial disadvantage by unfairly raising prices on northern and European made finished goods, while lowering the price of southern raw materials, especially cotton. As a result of this vote, Mayrant lost his 1816 bid for reelection. He resigned before the completion of his first term. Though his name was placed on the ballot again for the election of 1816, he was an unsuccessful candidate for reelection. Mayrant was succeeded by Nullifier Stephen Decatur Miller, who advocated tariff repeal.

After leaving Congress, Mayrant returned to his business and plantation interests. He also served as member of the South Carolina House of Representatives from 1818 to 1821.

Born at Charleston, to a prominent family from South Carolina, William Woodrop Mayrant was the son of John Mayrant and Ann Woodruff or Woodrup. Soon after the American Revolution, Mayrant studied law and became an attorney. He was a successful businessman and plantation owner, with interests in rice farming and one of South Carolina's first textile factories. Mayrant held the rank of Colonel in the South Carolina militia. After his 1787 marriage to Ann Richardson Mayrant (1771-1840) he established a Stateburg home he called "Ararat" which subsequent owners renamed "Argyle House". He later owned and operated a plantation called "High Hills".

William Mayrant died in 1832 and was buried at Church of the Holy Cross, near his home in Stateburg, Sumter County.

== Sources ==
- United States Congress. "William Mayrant (id: M000288)". Biographical Directory of the United States Congress.

U.S. House of Representatives
Preceded by John Kershaw	Member of the U.S. House of Representatives from South Carolina's 9th congressional district 1815-1816	Succeeded by Stephen D. Miller
