= Joseph Brevard =

American politician

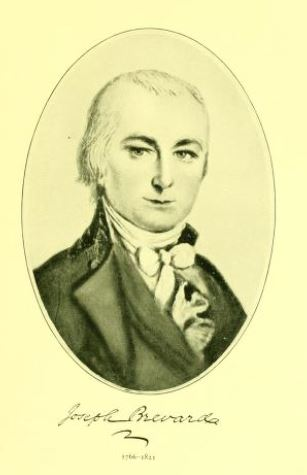

Member of the U.S. House of Representatives from South Carolina's 9th district
- In office March 4, 1819 – March 3, 1821
- Preceded by: Stephen D. Miller
- Succeeded by: James Blair

Justice of the South Carolina Supreme Court
- In office December 17, 1801 – December 1815

Member of the South Carolina House of Representatives
- In office 1796–1799

Personal details
- Born: July 19, 1766 Rowan County, Province of North Carolina, British America
- Died: October 11, 1821 (aged 55) Camden, South Carolina, U.S.
- Party: Democratic-Republican
- Profession: lawyer

Military service
- Allegiance: United States
- Branch/service: Continental Army
- Rank: Lieutenant
- Unit: North Carolina Line
- Battles/wars: American Revolutionary War

Joseph Brevard (July 19, 1766 – October 11, 1821) was an American Revolutionary War soldier. He was born in Rowan County (in the portion which later became Iredell County) in the Province of North Carolina. He served on the South Carolina Supreme Court (1801-1815) and as U.S. Representative from District 9 of South Carolina (1819-1821). He was also a slaveholder.

== Revolutionary war service ==
Joseph Brevard served first as an ensign and then lieutenant in the 1st North Carolina Regiment from 1781 to 1782. He was transferred to the 3rd North Carolina Regiment on February 6, 1781, where he became a regimental quartermaster. He served until the end of the war.

== Post war ==
He moved to Camden, South Carolina, and became sheriff of Camden District (1789–1791). He served as commissioner in equity October 14, 1791. He studied law, was admitted to the bar in 1792, and commenced practice in Camden. He engaged in the compilation of the law reports which bear his name 1793-1815. He served as member of South Carolina House of Representatives from 1796 to 1799.

Brevard was elected judge of the State supreme court December 17, 1801, and served until December 1815, when he resigned. He resumed the practice of law in Camden.

Brevard was elected as a Republican to the Sixteenth Congress (1819–1821). He was not a candidate for renomination in 1820. He was an unsuccessful candidate for Congress at a special election held in 1821. He died in Camden on October 11, 1821.

Political offices
Preceded by Stephen D. Miller	Member of the U.S. House of Representatives from South Carolina's 9th congressional district 1819–1821	Succeeded by James Blair
