= Meredith Calhoun =

American slave owner (1805–1869)

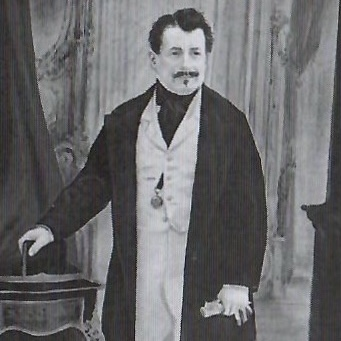
Meredith Calhoun (d. 1869) of Philadelphia, Alabama, Louisiana, and Paris

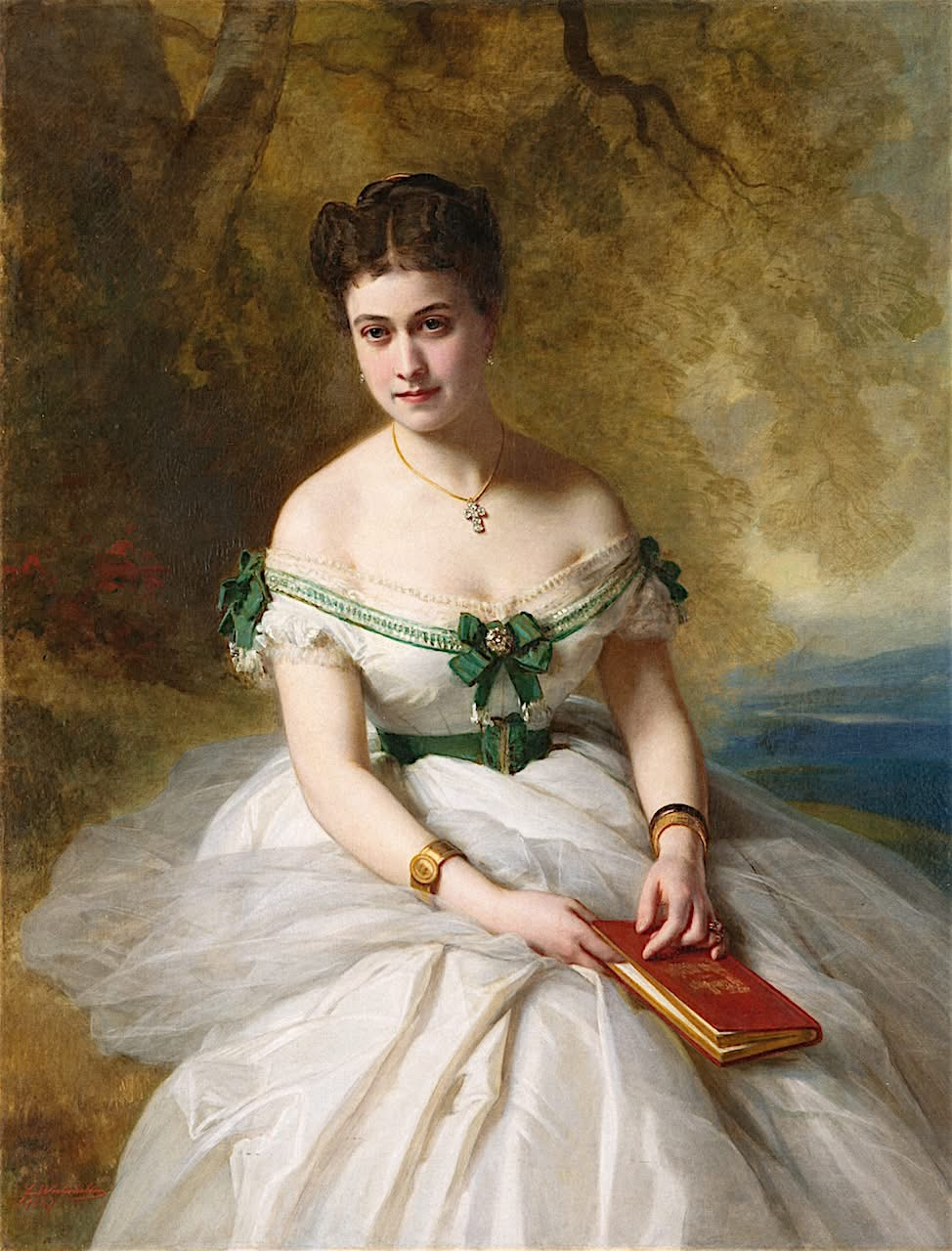
Calhoun paid legendary European court painter Franz Winterhalter to make this portrait of his daughter Ada in January 1867

Meredith Calhoun (c. 1805 – March 14, 1869) was an American landowner and slaveholder, known for owning some of the largest plantations in the Red River area north of Alexandria, Louisiana. His workers were enslaved African Americans. Exceptionally wealthy, thanks in part to an inheritance from Calhoun's wife's grandfather U.S. Senator William Smith, the Calhouns were absentee owners and spent most of their time traveling in Europe while overseers managed the commercial-scale production of cotton and sugar. When Frederick Law Olmsted did his journalistic tour of the slave states in the 1850s, the only slave whipping he witnessed was at a Calhoun plantation in Louisiana. The family also owned a grand house in Huntsville and other plantations in Alabama. During Reconstruction the old Calhoun plantations were the site of the Colfax massacre of black freedmen by anti-progressive white supremacists.

== Life and career ==
Calhoun seems to have been born in Pennsylvania, and educated in France. He started his career as an apprentice to Philadelphia financier Stephen Girard. He did business at the port of La Havre, France at one time. In May 1834, in Natchez, Adams County, Mississippi, he married Mary Taylor. He signed his name Colhoun but "years of tradition" have made Calhoun the common spelling.

Calhoun and his wife Mary Taylor Calhoun inherited her paternal grandfather's land and slaves in Alabama and Louisiana. As retold by the Historical Records Survey history of Grant Parish (1940), "The Calhoun lands, formerly owned by Judge William Smith, consisted of thirteen thousand acres. The estate contained four plantation quarters, still known today as Smithfield, Farenzi, Mirabeau, and Meredith. These plantations were well improved, with enormous barns, stables, mills, gins, and highly cultivated. One of the largest sugar mills in the State, erected at a cost of $100,000 was located at Farenzi. Meredith Calhoun owned one thousand slaves, and other planters, the Baldwins opposite Cotile Landing, the Lassards, the Gillards, and Thomas and Peter Hickman owned nearly as many." The crop on Firenze was sugar, the others were cotton land, with Smithfield also growing corn for subsistence. The plantations ran for seven miles along and three miles back from the riverbank. Each plantation had its own slave quarters, with the cabins clustered in groups of 12. Calhoun played a major role in the inter-regional slave trade of the American South, acting as a broker for the purchase and sale of thousands of enslaved persons.

The Louisiana property, on the right bank of the Rigolette Du Bon Dieu, had a steamboat landing that became known as Calhoun's Landing and eventually, during Reconstruction, became the site of Colfax, Grant Parish, the parish seat of a newly organized parish named for vice president Schuyler Colfax and president Ulysses S. Grant.

In 1836 an enslaved man in his 30s named Ransom, who had formerly been legally owned by the John Taylor estate, had gone missing and was thought to be "perhaps now lurking about Judge Wm. Smith's or Mr. Meredith Calhoon's plantations in Dallas or Autauga county." In 1840 Calhoun placed a runaway slave ad in a Huntsville newspaper seeking to recover Charles, "an excellent plasterer," about 30 years old, with notices also placed in Tuscaloosa, Louisville, and Nashville papers. While trying to sell the south Alabama plantations of his late grandfather-in-law, former U.S. Senator Smith, in 1842, he stated that he lived in Huntsville during the summer and New Orleans in the winter.

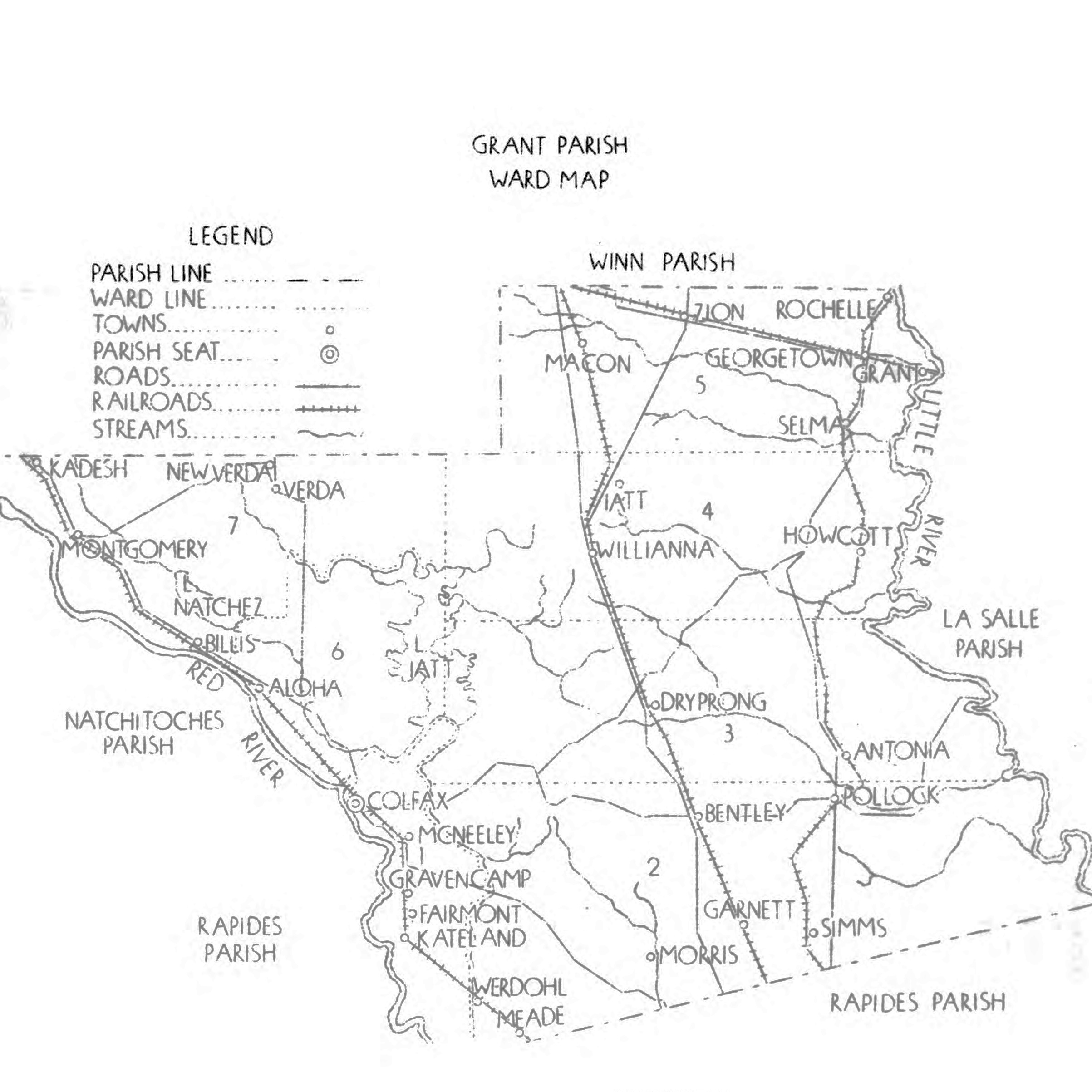
Grant Parish ward map (Historical Records Survey, 1940)

Calhoun moved some of his land and slaves into sugar agriculture and production in the 1840s, with local newspaper reporting, "Several planters of the parish of Rapides are now in successful operation in the manufacture of sugar, which is pronounced by competent judges to be equal to the sugar of the Mississippi coast or lower Louisiana, both in quality and yield. The highest plantation engaged in its culture on Red River is at its confluence with the Bon Dieu, that of Meredith Calhoun, Esq., who has erected a most magnificent brick house and purgery more than 300 feet (91 m) long, and will this year make some 200 hhds. of sugar. We understand he is preparing seed extensively for the next season, when it is contemplated that his plantation alone will turn out from 700 to 1000 hhds. Thus a new agricultural era will arise on Red River." In 1847 New Orleans papers reported that Calhoun's slaves in Rapides Parish had planted 1,000 acres of sugarcane that year and that Calhoun owned "one of the largest sugar houses in the state." The same year Calhoun bought a large number of enslaved people who had illegally been imported to the United States from Africa.

According to Huntsville, Alabama historian Linda Bayer, "By the 1850s, they had established the practice of spending most of their time in foreign travel, returning to Huntsville only occasionally to look after their varied financial interests. They were reputed to own a luxurious traveling coach in which they journeyed through Europe, indulging a taste for collecting European paintings and sculpture which were shipped to Huntsville and displayed in the gallery of the Calhoun house." In 1850, Calhoun held 719 enslaved people in Natchitoches and Rapides Parishes.

In 1851, a cholera outbreak killed 10 percent of the 700 people enslaved by Calhoun on four plantations in the Red River district of Louisiana. In addition to nearly 70 slaves, the doctor and an overseer died. In March 1853, as part of his research into American slavery, Frederick Law Olmsted visited Calhoun's plantation complex in Rapides Parish, Louisiana "where he spent two to three days." Olmsted's article about the anonymized Calhoun plantation was published in the New-York Daily Times on November 21, 1853. In a later republication of the same article, Olmsted wrote as introduction: "The estate I am now about to describe, was situated upon a tributary of the Mississippi, and accessible only by occasional steamboats: even this mode of communication being frequently interrupted at low stages of the rivers. The slaves upon it formed about one-twentieth of the whole population of the county, in which the blacks considerably outnumber the whites. At the time of my visit, the owner was sojourning upon it, with his family and several invited guests, but his usual residence was upon a small plantation, of little productive value, situated in a neighborhood somewhat noted for the luxury and hospitality of its citizens, and having a daily mail, and direct railroad and telegraphic communication with New York. This was, if I am not mistaken, his second visit in five years...The severest corporeal punishment of a negro that I witnessed at the South, occurred while I was visiting this estate." In a second article drawn from Olmsted's observations and interviews at these plantations, he recorded that "the proprietor," Calhoun, "believed the negro race was expressly designed by Providence for servitude."

In February 1855, the steamboat R. M. Jones delivered a consignment of 1,240 bales of cotton from Calhoun's Landing to Washington Jackson and Co., a cotton factor in New Orleans. According to a history of the Natchitoches area, "At the mouth of Cane river, lived Madame Boulard, the strong woman, who kept a store there. She was possessed of prodigious strength, and it is related of her that she could catch a whisky barrel by the chimes, place her knees against it, and put it up on the counter. No ordinary man could withstand her strength. Meredith Calhoun, who had a sugar plantation on the opposite bank of the river, accused her of selling whiskey to his hands, and buying surreptitiously sugar and molasses from them. He sent his overseer to her with a number of his negroes, stripped her naked, and turned her loose in a flatboat. It took nine negroes to do this. She sued him, got judgment against him, and it cost his heirs Smithfield plantation, 1,000 acres of land, to satisfy the judgment." Another version of this incident reads, "Grant's Point is the modern name given to the point at the mouth of Cane River. Frank Beaudry established a store here in 1865, as successor of the old ante-bellum French store of Madame Boulard. Owing to some difficulty with the people she was driven out. This action led to a suit against several persons in Grant Parish, and this suit led to a verdict for $5,000 damages against Meredith Calhoun." Testimony at the 1858 trial demonstrated that Calhoun had opposed the vigilantism and tried to talk the overseers out of it, but fruitlessly, and under the slave code of the era, he was entirely liable for the actions of his slaves in the attack on Antoinette Boulard because Calhoun's slaves had no legal personhood or autonomy.

According to historian Charles Lane, by 1860, Meredith Calhoun's slaves, overseers, soil, machinery, and the Red River of the South were producing US$167,000 (equivalent to $5,984,167 in 2025) worth of cotton annually. His land and slaves were said to be worth $1.1 million. The Calhouns were exceptionally wealthy. As retold by an Alabama newspaper in 1911, "In those days when millionaires were not so plentiful, the fortune of the Calhouns was considered enormous. They became patrons of art, spending most of their time in foreign travel, journeying in their own traveling coach, one of the most luxurious of that age before Pullman cars were in use. For twenty-five years or more, except for occasional visits to their American home to look after large interests in Alabama and Louisiana, the Calhouns resided abroad."

== American Civil War ==
In February 1861, Meredith Calhoun "of Georgia" was one of several Southerners presented to Napoleon III, Emperor of the French. A biographer of Virginia Clay-Clopton wrote that "Mrs. Meredith Calhoun...with her husband, played a brilliant part in Paris society when Eugénie's triumphs were at their height."

In October 1861 the Huntsville Democrat newspaper reported that Calhoun had returned from Paris where he had sought to promote the interests of the Confederate States government: "The friends of Mr. Meredith Calhoun were agreeably surprised by his ar[r]ival here, one day last week, in good health and spirits, after an ab[s]ence of over twelve months in Paris. He evaded espionage, and run the gauntlet of Northern rebel hunters, by studiously ignoring the English language after his ar[r]ival in Canada, and communicating with persons of the English tongue through his French attendant, who speaks English pretty well, and acted as his interpreter. He brings intelligence of the rapid progress of the public opinion Confederate in favor of government, the recognition since our victory at Manassas. As he passed through London, he says Mr. Yancey told him he anticipated the breaking of the blockade by England and France between the 15th of October and the 15th November, at farthest, in which opinion Mr. C., whose opportunities for acquiring information very favorable, fully concurs."

As of June 1862 Calhoun's house in Huntsville had been occupied by the U.S. Army which had used it as a field hospital; news reports stated that "this mansion cost $50,000, contains a large and handsome collection of paintings, statuary, &c, including some rare specimens of Mosaic tables, a facsimile of the celebrated Warwick vase, &c., and that the grounds are laid out in parterres, with elaborate elegance, It is to be hoped that these will be spared from vandal depredations." Generally known as the Calhoun House, this had originally been constructed as property of Calhoun's father-in-law, Smith, and together with the gardens and outbuildings took up a whole block "bounded by Randolph, Enstis, Greene and Lincoln streets."

In February 1864 the Huntsville paper reported that 30 men who had been enslaved by Calhoun had been "conscribed" into the U.S. Army.

== Legacy ==
The Calhoun plantations and a new town called Colfax built around a store founded by his progressive son William Calhoun became the center of the deadly and momentous Colfax massacre during the Reconstruction era.

As of 1941 part of Calhoun's former property in Louisiana was known as the Teal plantation.

Calhoun House in Huntsville was leased to the U.S. District Court for the Northern District of Alabama for a courthouse and offices from 1876 to at least 1888.

== Personal life ==
The Calhouns had four children, two of whom survived to adulthood:

- William Smith Calhoun who married Cora E. P., parents of Mary Earl Taylor Calhoun
- Marie Marguerite Ada Calhoun who married G. W. Lane; they lived at Colfax, Louisiana
- John Taylor Calhoun (1838–1842)
- Meredith Calhoun Jr. (1840–1846)

Meredith Calhoun and his wife both died intestate. In June 1871, the two heirs of Meredith and Mary Calhoun agreed to split their inheritance, with William Calhoun taking all the Louisiana property and Marie Calhoun Lane taking all the Alabama property.

== Alleged depiction in Uncle Tom's Cabin ==
There have been reports dating to the 19th century that author Harriet Beecher Stowe based the character of Simon Legree in her novel Uncle Tom's Cabin (1852) on Calhoun. She depicted Legree as a cruel slave owner, and the character's name has become synonymous with greed and cruelty. Daniel S. Corley's Visit to Uncle Tom's Cabin, published in 1892 and set on the McAlpin plantation in Natchitoches Parish, Louisiana, also claimed a Stowe-on-the-Red-River connection.

== Art collection ==
In 1910 a Huntsville woman sold the "Meredith Calhoun collection" of art to Eli P. Clark of Los Angeles.

- “Mother of the Gracchi,” Guiseppe Sabotelli, 1837.
- “Tasso Reading Poems,” Sabotelli, 1837.
- “Pool of Bethesda,” by Droosch-Sloot, 1633, signed by the artist
- “Coliseum at Rome,” artist unknown.
- “Ruins in Greece,” artist unknown
- “Sunset," artist unknown.
- “Travelers,” artist unknown
- “Storm at Sea,” artist unknown
- “Persian Sybil,” after Giochino.
- “Madonna and Child,” after Murillo.
- "Holy Family,” a copy after Raphael, known as De la Impanala.
- “Holy Family,” a copy on wood after Raphael.
- “Madonna and Child,” a copy on wood after Raphael, known as De la Sedia.
- “Coronation of tho Virgin,” copy after Raphael.
- “Holy Family.” artist unknown, contained in fine Florentine frame.
- “Fruit Girl,” after Titian, in fine Florentine frame.
- “Lavinia,” after Titian.
- “Fortune Tellers,” after Caravogia
- “Gamesters,” after Caravogia.
- “Crucifixion of St. Andrews,” after Carlo Dolci.
- “Prayer,” an original by Carlo Dolci.
- “Aurora,” after Guido Reni.
- “Michael and the Dragon,” artist unknown.
- “Prayer,” an original marble statue by Bartolini.
- “Paris Throwing the Apple,” an original by Thomas Crawford, Rome, 1837.
- Bust of Washington by Thomas Crawford.
- Head of Ceres, a bust by Tadolini
- “Venus of the Bath,” after Canova.
- “Venus of the Box,” a statue after Canova.
- Two pieces of bronze by C. Troulllard, entitled "Pluto and Cerebus” and "Neptune.”
- One large Florentine mosaic table set in solid brass with brass pedestal and base.

== See also ==
- Portrait of Miss Ada Calhoun
