= John J. Chappell =

American politician

John Joel Chappell

Member of the U.S. House of Representatives from South Carolina's 4th district
- In office March 4, 1813 – March 3, 1817
- Preceded by: William Lowndes
- Succeeded by: Joseph Bellinger

Member of the South Carolina House of Representatives from Richland District
- In office November 28, 1808 – August 29, 1812

Personal details
- Born: January 19, 1782 Fairfield District, South Carolina
- Died: May 23, 1871 (aged 89) Lowndes County, Alabama
- Resting place: Columbia, South Carolina
- Party: Democratic-Republican
- Education: South Carolina College
- Profession: lawyer, planter

Military service
- Allegiance: United States of America
- Branch/service: South Carolina militia
- Years of service: 1805–1813
- Rank: Colonel
- Battles/wars: War of 1812

John Joel Chappell (January 19, 1782 – May 23, 1871) was a U.S. Representative from South Carolina.

Born on Little River, near Columbia, Fairfield District, South Carolina, where the family was on a visit, Chappell was, as an infant, taken by his parents to their home on the Congaree River, Richland District, South Carolina. He attended the common schools and was graduated from the law department of South Carolina College (now the University of South Carolina) at Columbia. He was admitted to the bar in 1805 and commenced practice in Columbia, South Carolina. He was appointed adjutant of the Thirty-third South Carolina Regiment in 1805 and elected captain and then colonel of the same regiment in 1808. He served as member of the State house of representatives 1808–1812. He was appointed trustee of South Carolina College in 1809. He served in the War of 1812.

Chappell was elected as a Democratic-Republican to the Thirteenth and Fourteenth Congresses (March 4, 1813 – March 3, 1817). He served as chairman of the Committee on Pensions and Revolutionary Claims (Thirteenth and Fourteenth Congresses). He resumed the practice of law until 1837. He served as director of the Columbia branch of the State Bank of South Carolina 1830–1858. He moved to Lowndes County, Alabama, and became a cotton planter. He died in Lowndes County on May 23, 1871. He was interred in First Baptist Church Cemetery, Columbia, South Carolina.

== Sources ==
- United States Congress. "John J. Chappell (id: C000320)". Biographical Directory of the United States Congress.

U.S. House of Representatives
Preceded by William Lowndes	Member of the U.S. House of Representatives from South Carolina's 4th congressional district 1813–1817	Succeeded by Joseph Bellinger
