= William Smith (South Carolina politician, born 1762) =

American politician (c. 1762–1840)

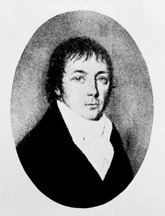

United States Senator from South Carolina
- In office November 29, 1826 – March 3, 1831
- Preceded by: William Harper
- Succeeded by: Stephen Miller
- In office December 4, 1816 – March 3, 1823
- Preceded by: John Taylor
- Succeeded by: Robert Hayne

Member of the South Carolina Senate from the York district
- In office November 28, 1831 – December 17, 1831
- Preceded by: Benjamin Person
- Succeeded by: William Hill

Member of the South Carolina House of Representatives from the York district
- In office November 22, 1824 – November 29, 1826
- Preceded by: Multi-member district
- Succeeded by: William McGill

Personal details
- Born: c. 1762 York County, South Carolina
- Died: June 26, 1840 (aged 77–78) Huntsville, Alabama, U.S.
- Party: Democratic-Republican (Before 1825); Democratic (1828–1840)

William Smith (c. 1762 – June 26, 1840), often Judge Smith or Judge Wm. Smith in written records of his era, was an American lawyer, judge, plantation owner, and politician. He served two discontinuous terms in the United States Senate, from 1816 to 1823, and from 1826 to 1831, representing the state of South Carolina. Smith was one of the major figures of South Carolina politics during the first third of the 19th century, and formed an intense rivalry with John C. Calhoun, arguing against Calhoun's nationalist views, and advocating for states' rights. He was also a leading pro-slavery voice in the Senate. He fiercely attacked the then-feeble movement to abolish slavery in the United States, and spent his legislative career on both the state and federal levels advocating for the perpetuation of the slave trade and the expansion of legal slavery across the continent. He was also vituperative opponent of government spending on infrastructure or public development ("internal improvements"), to the point that he counterintuitively voted against the admission of Mississippi, Alabama, and Missouri as new U.S. states where slavery would be legal, apparently because he thought the U.S. government was being greedy in its reserve of land for public use, in usurpation of the power of the citizen and the existing states.

Smith was awarded electoral votes for the vice presidency in two separate presidential elections. When Smith's lifelong friend Andrew Jackson became president he tried twice to persuade Smith to take a seat on the U.S. Supreme Court but Smith declined on both occasions.

Smith left both the Senate and South Carolina in the 1830s, in part because Calhoun had been victorious in their power struggle. Smith bought and developed vast tracts of land in the west. His investments were well-chosen and ultimately wildly profitable in part because he was privileged with inside information. U.S. Indian Commissioner plenipotentiary Jackson had advised him to invest in the vicinity of the Tennessee River before land cession treaties had been signed with the Chickasaw and Cherokee, and Smith himself was a member of the Private Land Claims committee that oversaw real estate claims and disputes that had arisen in the wake of the Louisiana Purchase. Smith developed massive plantation complexes in Alabama and along the Red River of the South in Louisiana, as well as acquiring hundreds of slaves to plant those lands with the profitable cash crops of cotton and sugar. Once settled in Huntsville, Smith served in the Alabama state legislature until his death. When he died in 1840 he was said to be "almost a millionaire in wealth," which would be a fortune of approximately $30 million in 2023. He was long remembered for commissioning grand homes for himself in South Carolina and Alabama, including the now-demolished Calhoun House in central Huntsville, which was named not for his South Carolina rival but for his grandson-in-law and successor in grand-scale enslavement, Meredith Calhoun.

== Early life and career ==
Smith was born c. 1762 in either North Carolina or York County, South Carolina. A memoirist called "Septugenarian," writing in 1870, referred to the historic Tryon County, North Carolina, which included parts of present-day South Carolina, and stated "I always thought he was from Lincoln," meaning the vicinity of Lincolnton, in what is now Lincoln County, North Carolina. Lincolnton was connected to Yorkville (present-day York, South Carolina) by what was called the King's Mountain Road. Smith's granddaughter and heir, Mary Taylor Calhoun, volunteered to a researcher that "vague impression that, by a re-adjustment of the boundary lines between North and South Carolina, his birth-place, formerly in the jurisdiction of South Carolina, was thrown into North Carolina. Not much is known about Smith's early life outside of his education. According to his granddaughter, "Judge Smith's father was, at one time, a man of considerable property, but his fortune was greatly impaired by the depreciation of the continental money. He, however, was able to give his sons as good classical educations as the academies of those days afforded. Judge Smith was a good Latin and Greek scholar...His father started him in the world with only one negro, Priam, well known here as a foreman, and now living on the farm, adjacent to the town of Huntsville, which Judge Smith left to Mrs. Calhoun." He first attended a school in the neighborhood of Bullock's Creek, where he befriended classmates and fellow future national politicians Andrew Jackson and William H. Crawford. The school at Bullock's Creek was located in the "District between Broad and Catawba Rivers," and taught by Rev. Mr. Joseph Alexander, who also had a school in the Waxhaws. Over a century later, another Carolinian described Smith as "a strong personal friend of President Jackson." The memoirs of Alabama "belle" Virginia Clay-Clopton, published 1904, described Smith as "the warm friend of Andrew Jackson." Smith reportedly had at least one brother "who was a lawyer also, and, unfortunately, intemperate." This may be Bennett Smith (or there may be other brothers). Another report attesting to Bennett Smith's alcohol use is in the 1845 journal of Murfreesboro resident Samuel Harvey Laughlin, who wrote that, "Maj. Bennett Smith, a remarkable man, is still living, had removed to town to enjoy his fortune about the time I went to the place to live. He pretended, however, now and then, especially when drunk, to engage in the practice of law."

The boundary between North Carolina and South Carolina was adjusted in 1772, resulting in what South Carolina called the New Acquisition

Smith then attended Mt. Zion College in Winnsboro, South Carolina, which was the first preparatory school in the region. He once stated to a friend stated that his life could be described as "wild, reckless, intemperate, rude and boisterous, yet resolute and determined." To that same friend he also credited all of his success to a promise he once made to his wife, Margaret Duff, to forego alcohol.

Smith's law career began on January 6, 1784 when he was admitted to the bar. In one notable case, his client who had been charged for killing a horse failed to appear before the court. Smith did not see the man for a number of years until he ran into him in the Hall of the House of Representatives. The man, known to Smith by the surname "Elchinor", now went by the name John Alexander and was a Representative for the state of Ohio. Smith ensured that Representative Alexander paid him for his previous services.

He may have been resident in the York District during his South Carolina days, but also dwelled for a time in Pinckneyville in the Union District. The South Carolina local historian "Septugenarian" described Smith as an angry, violent man, widely feared as a controlling power within the community:

His resentments were strong, and sometimes he allowed his irascible temper to get the better of him, and he would use his cane as well as the biting sarcasm for which he was famous. Fisticuffs, too, were rather more dignified then than now; but though I have seen the Judge several times attempt to take things high-handed in a dispute, some one always interfered, after one or two blows, and stopped the combatants...From his early residence, high position and dogmatical character, Judge Smith was long the autocrat of York. True, he was tyrannical to some extent; but for many years he was the pride of our district. Early in life she bestowed on him her honors; later he showed the wisdom of her trust, winning high places for himself and from them reflecting hack on her his fame. So if not loved, he was universally looked up to and respected.

== Political career ==
It is not entirely clear when Smith first joined the South Carolina legislature but in 1803 he was "the chief sponsor of the bill to reopen the slave trade in the state...[and] fought to keep it open until 1808" when the federal ban on imports went into effect. According to the Bench and Bar of South Carolina, "Judge Smith was a member of the Legislature of South Carolina for many years. In 1805, he was elected a member of the Board of Trustees of the South Carolina College." He was elected to the South Carolina Senate from York District in 1804. In 1806 he was elected president of the South Carolina State Senate. In 1808 he became a judge. As a jurist his temperament was considered "tyranical but fair."

According to a South Carolina newspaper, in about 1815 he built a grand house in Yorkville: "The lot on which it stood comprises a beautiful pack of twelve acres...In the construction of the house, only the best heart lumber was used, and at that period carving and ornamental work being the rage on all houses of pretension, no expense was spared by the builder in this style of ornamentation. We have heard it stated that the cost of the house was US$17,000 (equivalent to $299,045 in 2025), and after it was finished was regarded as the finest residence then in the upper part of the State, and persons were known to travel & distance of sixty miles or more for no other purpose but to see the wonderful piece of architecture." At some point, perhaps in the 1820s, he also built a fine house at Turkey Creek.

Then in 1816, Smith was elected a United States Senator, after defeating James R. Pringle for the seat, 101 to 51. He served his first term as a U.S. Senator was 1817 to 1823, when he was replaced by Robert Y. Hayne. During his time in the Senate he seems to frequently have spoken from the floor about slavery and slave trade. For instance in 1819 he declared, "Our Northern friends are not afraid to furnish the Southern States with Africans." In 1820, during the debates over the Missouri Compromise, Smith "directly linked the reopening [of the transatlantic slave trade to South Carolina] and the Louisiana Purchase...Supporting the expansion of slavery without restriction, Smith entered volumes of archival documents from the Charleston slave trade into the congressional record to demonstrate that his state's African slave trade from 1803 to 1808 actually fed the western frontier rather than South Carolina." Smith was one of the first Southerners to argue, at the time of the Missouri Compromise in 1820, that American slavery was a "positive good", arguing that the enslaved were "so domesticated, or so kindly treated by their masters, and their situations so improved" that few would express discontent with their condition.

Shortly after taking office, Smith began a political feud with John C. Calhoun which would last the duration of his political career in South Carolina. The feud between Calhoun and Smith resided in their different political philosophies, when Smith joined the Senate, Calhoun was still a nationalist who believed in funding infrastructure improvements and a "broad construction" of the Constitution, two concepts which Smith found repugnant. In response to Calhoun's growing popularity, Smith formed a coalition of States' Rights allies which included Thomas Cooper, Stephen Decatur Miller, Josiah J. Evans, and David Rogerson Williams. The South Carolina nationalists led by Calhoun "favored a few national roads because of national military necessity," although they repudiated small-scale local appropriations. But, to the Smith faction, even roads for purported military use would instead be used to bolster the economy of other states. This concept of South Carolina in competition with the nation for economic prosperity was common at the time in the South Carolina elite.

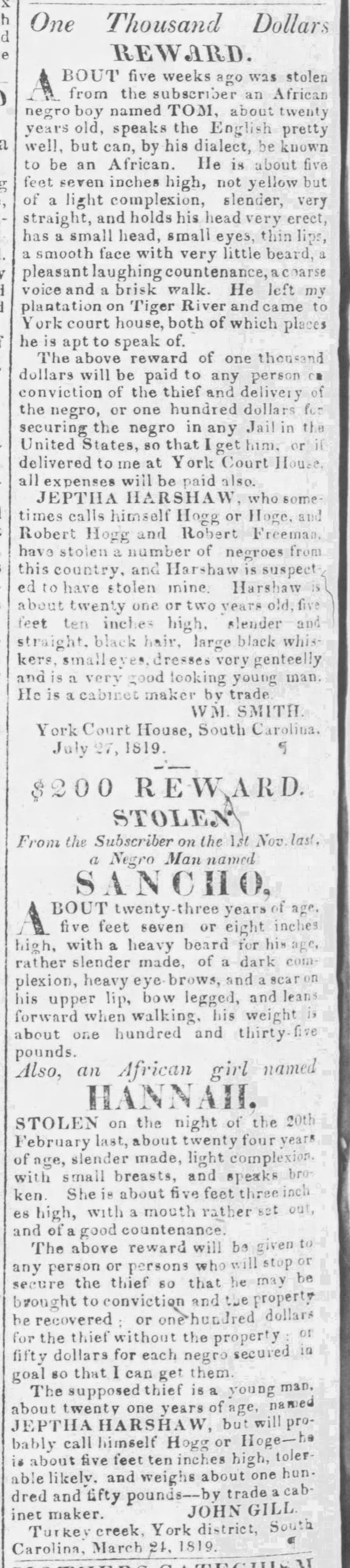
One Thousand Dollars Reward, Knoxville Register, August 17, 1819

During the 1820s, Smith began buying up land in the west. In 1823 he bought a lot at the northwest corner of Eustis and Greene streets that became the first parcel in what became what was called the Calhoun House property, and every year until 1832 bought more lots in town until he owned the entire block as well as "most of the block that fronts on East Side Square." According to Huntsville architectural historian Linda Bayer, "he began assembling acreage immediately northeast of the town, in what is now East Huntsville Addition, with the purchase of 640 acres for $18,000 cash. Additional purchases in 1828 and 1831 increased this holding to almost 1,000 acres, and this land became his Huntsville plantation which he named Spring Grove." This property was later known as Calhoun Grove. Smith may have summered in Huntsville beginning in 1825. Also in 1825 he bought the Huntsville Inn, a three-story brick tavern, soon to be demolished, and hired architect George Steele to construct a spring house, made of brick, for one of his Huntsville properties.

Between 1823 and 1826, Smith returned to the South Carolina House of Representatives. He was sent to the U.S. Senate a second time in December 1826. Thirty years later he was remembered as "one of the earliest and most able opponents of the Northern abolition movement in the Senate of the United States." By 1826 he was a strong Jacksonian, and "their sameness of political creed cemented and strengthened their earlier ties." By the end of this term he was chairman of the powerful U.S. Senate Judiciary Committee.

Defeated for reelection to the U.S. Senate by Stephen D. Miller in 1830, he was then elected back to the South Carolina Senate.

In 1831 he aligned himself with the Union and State Rights Party. In 1832, he began buying land in Louisiana, having lost his political base in South Carolina. At this time he may have purchased a sugar plantation in the vicinity of Lafourche, Louisiana. He seems to have lived in New Orleans over the winter of 1832–33.

== Move to Alabama ==
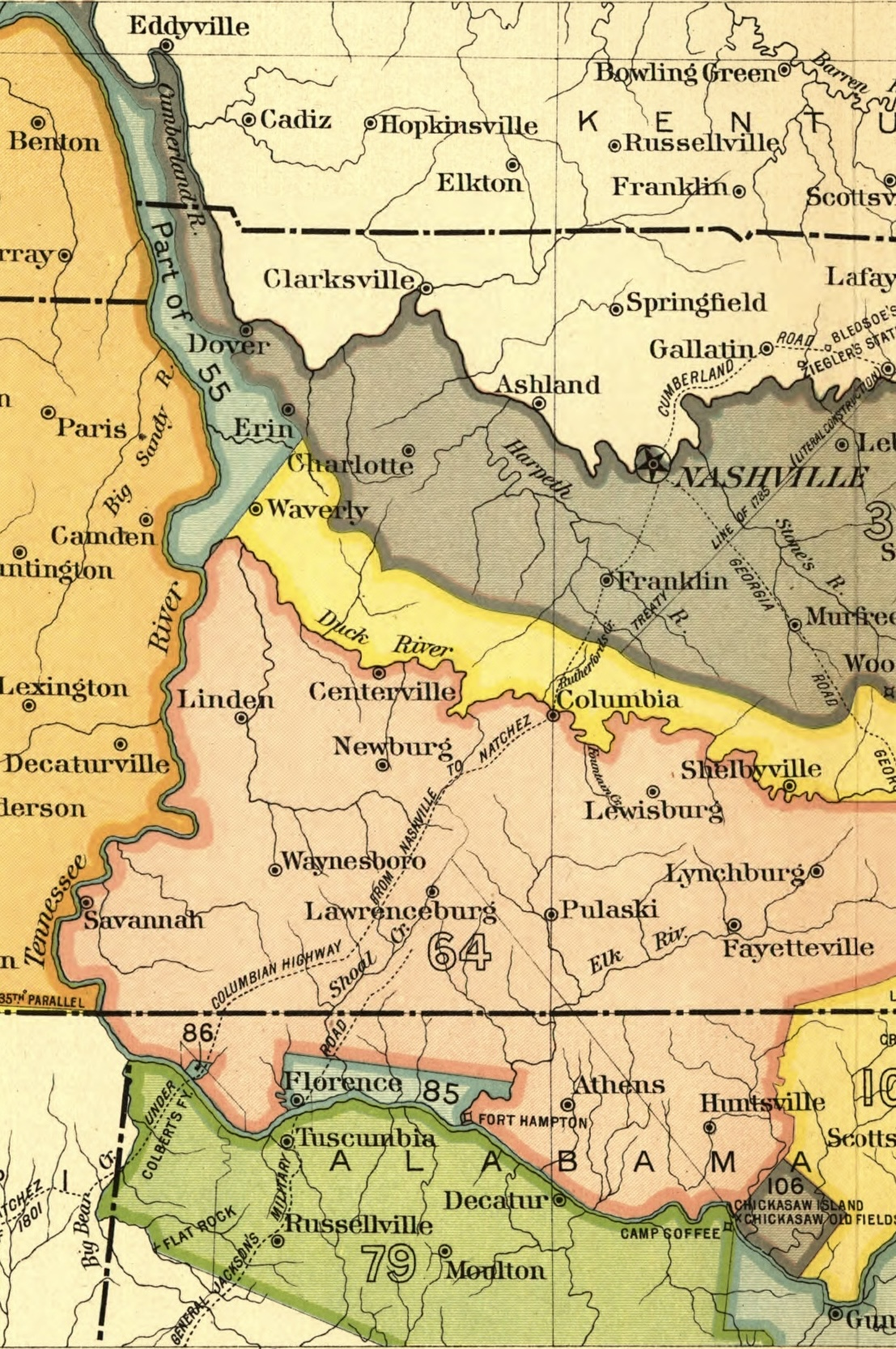
Vicinity of the Tennessee River from Indian land cessions in the United States showing location of Huntsville, Alabama

In 1833, he moved to Huntsville, Alabama permanently. He had long held property in Alabama, and was elected to the Alabama House of Representatives for Madison County from August 1, 1836, holding that seat for the rest of his life. During the 1830s and 1840s, Smith (and later, his granddaughter and grandson-in-law) paid an estimated $20,000 for the construction of Calhoun House, in an era when most houses in the area cost about $5,000 in construction expenses. Another account claims that it was US$75,000 (equivalent to $2,267,578 in 2025) for the construction of the mansion; the grounds covered the entire city block bounded by Randolph, Eustis, Greene, and Lincoln streets. Calhoun House was estimated to have 10,000 sq ft of floor space, and would have thus been the biggest residence in Huntsville. Construction took over six years and involved large outlays to the architects, to bricklayers for the placement of over one million bricks (some of which were recycled from other structures in town), woodworkers, and plasterers.

The same year Smith bought a massive plantation on the Red River of the South in Louisiana from Edward Gilliard, heir of Joseph Gilliard. His agents for this purchase included brothers John and Peter Hickman, and steamboat pioneer Henry Shreve, namesake of Shreveport. Smith may have known about the property because sat on the U.S. Senate Committee on Private Land Claims, and Shreve may have been inclined to assist him because his contract to break up the Red River Raft depended on appropriations for internal improvements made by the Congress. As an owner of land along the Red River, Smith benefitted from federal expenditures to improve navigation, which was in stark contrast to his stated objection to federally financed public works. As a U.S. Senator Smith had opposed the admission of Mississippi, Alabama, and Missouri as new U.S. states because the government's plan to reserve five percent of the land for public use; Smith deemed these reservations "monstrous donations" to the benefit of the national government. He also hypocritically agitated against infrastructure funding when he was an Alabama state legislator.

Smith may have owned a plantation near Montgomery, Alabama, in addition to his Huntsville lands. A member of the planter class, Smith owned several plantations and at least 71 slaves. Smith reportedly donated the land for an elite preparatory boarding school in antebellum Huntsville called Green Academy.

In 1839, the American Anti-Slavery Society published American Slavery As It Is. Smith's neighbor's son, a young Presbyterian minister who had become close friends with Theodore Dwight Weld and an ardent abolitionist, contributed three pages of anecdotes about slavery in the vicinity of Huntsville, where he had grown up. Rev. William T. Allan's "Testimony" began with information about Smith.

I was born and have lived most of my life in the slave states, mainly in the village of Huntsville, Alabama, where my parents still reside. I seldom went to a plantation, and as my visits were confined almost exclusively to the families of pro. fessing Christians, my personal knowledge of slavery, was consequently a knowledge of its fairest side, (if fairest may be predicated of foul.) There was one plantation just opposite my father's house in the suburbs of Huntsville, belonging to Judge Smith, formerly a Senator in Congress from South Carolina, now of Huntsville. The name of his overseer was Tune. I have often seen him flogging the slaves in the field, and have often heard their cries. Sometimes, too, I have met them with the tears streaming down their faces, and the marks of the whip, ('whelks') on their bare necks and shoulders.

Tune was so severe in his treatment, that his employer dismissed him after two or three years, lest, it was said, he should kill off all the slaves. But he was immediately employed by another planter in the neighborhood.

The following fact was stated to me by my brother, James M. Allan, now residing at Richmond, Henry county, Illinois, and clerk of the circuit and county courts. Tune became displeased with one of the women who was pregnant, he made her lay down over a log, with her face towards the ground, and beat her so unmercifully, that she was soon after delivered of a dead child.

My brother also stated to me the following, which occurred near my father's house, and within sight and hearing of the academy and public garden. Charles, a fine active negro, who belonged to a bricklayer in Huntsville, exchanged the burning sun of the brickyard to enjoy for a season the pleasant shade of an adjacent mountain. When his master got him back, he tied him by his hands so that his feet could just touch the ground—stripped off his clothes, took a paddle, bored full of holes, and paddled him leisurely all day long. It was two weeks before they could tell whether he would live or die. Neither of these cases attracted any particular notice in Huntsville.

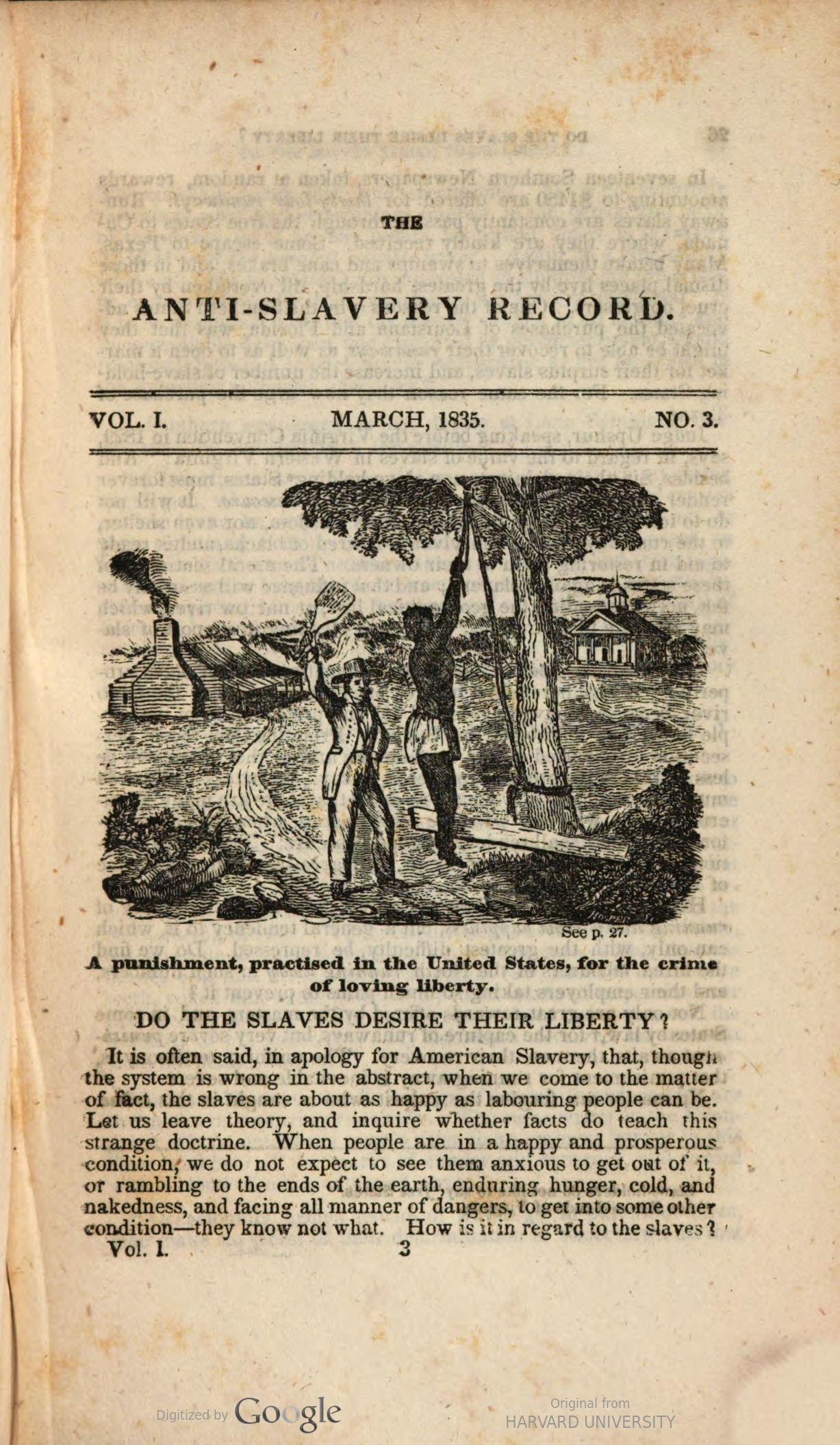
Anti-Slavery Record, March 1835; Rev. Allan's description is quoted on page 27

Allan's description of the use of what was called "the hot paddle" on the enslaved brickmaker Charles, "within sight and hearing of the academy and public garden," was probably the source of the cover illustration of The Anti-Slavery Record of March 1835.

== Vice-presidential candidacies ==
Smith was a contender in the presidential–vice presidential contests during both the 1828 and 1836 electoral cycles. In 1828, seven electors from Georgia chose him for vice president, instead of Calhoun, the Democratic nominee.

He was also a splinter candidate for Vice President of the United States in 1836: Virginia refused to accept Richard Mentor Johnson as the Democratic vice presidential candidate. Johnson was considered the "western" candidate but his relationship with a mixed-race woman, Julia Chinn, alienated the "southern" contingent, which voted for the ticket of Martin Van Buren and William Smith, putting Johnson one electoral vote short of a majority; the Senate went on to elect Johnson. The votes for Smith were apparently the result of an "overture to faithless electors."

== Supreme Court consideration ==
Jackson wanted Smith to serve on the U.S. Supreme Court when there was a vacancy in 1829 but Smith declined. On March 3, 1837, outgoing President Andrew Jackson nominated Smith to the Supreme Court. Five days later, the newly seated Senate of the 25th Congress confirmed Smith's nomination by a vote of 23–18. However, Smith declined the appointment and did not serve. Martin Van Buren then appointed to the bench John McKinley, who had been partners with Jackson's longtime associates John Coffee and James Jackson in the Cypress Land Company, a land speculation operation in northern Alabama.

== Death and legacy ==
Smith died in June 1840 at his Huntsville estate Calhoun Place of "congestive fever" in after a month-long illness. He was buried in Madison County, Alabama. Initially buried in a family cemetery on his Spring Grove plantation, Smith was reinterred at Maple Hill Cemetery when the plantation was sold off and subdivided after the American Civil War. His wife survived him by two years. Their granddaughter was bequeathed $100,000 in Smith's 1839 will, and two great-grandchildren were bequeathed $50,000 each, all in cash, and the remainder of the estate fell to Smith's granddaughter when her grandmother died. A partial inventory of Smith's property in just Madison County included 43 enslaved people, livestock, a wine collection valued at $1,000, a book collection valued at $1,000, and $4,000 in silver plate.

In 1842, Smith's grandson-in-law Calhoun listed for sale two cotton plantations, located across from each other at Burand's Bend along the Alabama River, both of which had formerly been owned by Smith. One was 1800 acres in the jurisdiction of Autauga County, Alabama, and the other was 1400 acres lying within Dallas County. The 63 slaves that worked the two properties could be expected to produce 450–500 bales of cotton annually, each bale weighing 500 pounds (230 kg).

Smith Street in Huntsville's Old Town Historic District is named for Senator Smith.

== Personal life ==
Smith's widow, the former Margaret Duff, died at Huntsville on January 24, 1842, "at a very advanced age."

=== Bennett Smith (brother) ===
William Smith's brother Bennett "Ben" Smith (1763–1848) was "a wealthy and prominent lawyer...who lived in princely style." According to one account he was admitted to practice in Buncombe County, North Carolina in the 1790s. He was married to Isabella Dickson, a daughter of Congressman Joseph Dickson. Isabella had previously been married to a man named Henderson. They were married in Lincolnton, North Carolina, and members of the Dickson and Smith families immigrated to Rutherford County, Tennessee circa 1803. Smith was appointed the first Rutherford County attorney in 1808. According to county tax records, Bennett Smith owned 670 acres in Rutherford County in 1809. In 1817 he was named to the Rutherford County courthouse construction committee. Smith was the head of a household in Rutherford County, Tennessee at the time of the U.S. population censuses of 1810, 1820, 1830, and 1840.

Isabella Dickson Smith supposedly brought the first piano ever known in Tennessee over the mountains from North Carolina by wagon. Isabella Dickson Smith helped organize the Murfreesboro Presbyterian Church in April 1812.

=== Isabella Dickson and Bennett Smith's children ===
- Bennett Smith's daughter Mary, called Polly, became the wife of John Hutchings, Andrew Jackson's nephew and one of his slave-and-horse-trading business partners.
- Another daughter, Matilda Smith, married a Dr. John R. Bedford and they were the parents of the future Mrs. C. M. Burtwell and Mrs. E. B. Weakley, who were residents of Florence, Alabama.
- A third daughter, Margaret Dickson Smith (c. 1795–bef. 1827) married Uriah S. Cummins, who served under John Coffee in the Creek War and/or in the southwestern theater of War of 1812 and later moved to Texas with his second wife.
- A son named Thomas B. Smith married Temperance Bass, who was a daughter of James Bass. After Thomas B. Smith died, Temperance Bass Smith remarried Benjamin Rucker in 1825.
- Bennett Smith's son William Hunter Smith lived at the Hermitage for a time, as one of Andrew Jackson's many "wards", even though his parents outlived Jackson. William H. Smith was executor of his mother's will in 1852.

=== Mary Smith Taylor (daughter) and Mary Taylor Calhoun (granddaughter) ===
Smith and his wife had one child who survived to adulthood. Her name was Mary Margaret Smith, and she married Col. John Taylor, Esq. of Pendleton. Taylor was in the South Carolina House of Representatives, and was a Congressman from South Carolina for one term (1815–1817). Mary Smith died young but her only child, another daughter, was raised and educated by her grandparents. Thus Smith's heir was his granddaughter, Mary Taylor, who married Meredith Calhoun. Judge Smith reportedly kept the bones of his daughter in a box and carried them with him wherever he went; they were buried with him when he died.

== Sources ==
- Bayer, Linda (Spring–Summer 1983). "The Calhoun House". The Historic Huntsville Quarterly of Architecture and Preservation. IX (3 and 4, Article 5). Huntsville, Alabama: Historic Huntsville Foundation: 29–36. ISSN 1074-567X. OCLC 29746603 – via uah.edu.
- DeWitt, John H. (January 1931). "Andrew Jackson and His Ward, Andrew Jackson Hutchings: A History Hitherto Unpublished". Tennessee Historical Magazine. Series II. 1 (2): 83–106. ISSN 2333-9012. JSTOR 42638062. OCLC 562433857.
- Keith, LeeAnna (2008). The Colfax Massacre: The Untold Story of Black Power, White Terror, and the Death of Reconstruction. New York: Oxford University Press. ISBN 978-0-19-531026-9. LCCN 2007023368. OCLC 191027904.
- Lane, Charles (2008). The Day Freedom Died: The Colfax Massacre, the Supreme Court, and the Betrayal of Reconstruction. Henry Holt & Co. ISBN 9781429936781. LCCN 2007037514. OCLC 1159703374.
- Latner, Richard B. (March 1975). "A New Look at Jacksonian Politics". The Journal of American History. 61 (4): 943–969. doi:10.2307/1890640. JSTOR 1890640.
- Meredith, Rachel (May 2013). "There Was Somebody Always Dying and Leaving Jackson as Guardian": The Wards of Andrew Jackson (M.A. History thesis). Murfreesboro, Tennessee: Middle Tennessee State University. ProQuest 1538368.
- Perry, B. F. (1859). "William Smith". In O'Neall, John B. (ed.). Biographical Sketches of the Bench and Bar of South Carolina. Vol. I. Greenville, Sept. 3d, 1858. Charleston, South Carolina: S.G. Courtenay & Co. pp. 106–120. LCCN 05041669. OCLC 3312491. IA biographicalsket01onea_0.
- Shugerman, Jed Handelsman (Summer 2002). "The Louisiana Purchase and South Carolina's Reopening of the Slave Trade in 1803". Journal of the Early Republic. 22 (2): 263–290. doi:10.2307/3125182. JSTOR 3125182.
- Weld, Theodore Dwight; Grimké, Angelina; Grimké, Sarah Moore (1839). "Testimony of the Rev. William T. Allan, Late of Alabama". American Slavery As It Is: Testimony of a Thousand Witnesses. American Anti-Slavery Society. New York: Published by the American Anti-Slavery Society, office, no. 143 Nassau Street. pp. 45–47. LCCN 11008377. OCLC 14906369. OL 20509019M. This article incorporates text from this source, which is in the public domain.

U.S. Senate
Preceded by John Taylor	U.S. Senator (Class 2) from South Carolina; 1816–1823; Served alongside: John Gaillard	Succeeded by Robert Hayne
Preceded by William Harper	U.S. Senator (Class 3) from South Carolina; 1826–1831; Served alongside: Robert Hayne	Succeeded by Stephen Miller
Party political offices
New political party	Democratic-Republican nominee for Vice President of the United States^{(1)} 1828	Succeeded by Martin Van Buren
Preceded by Martin Van Buren	Democratic nominee for Vice President of the United States^{(2)} 1836	Succeeded by Richard Johnson^{(3)}
Preceded by Martin Van Buren	Democratic nominee for Vice President of the United States^{(2)} 1836	Succeeded by James Polk^{(3)}
Preceded by Martin Van Buren	Democratic nominee for Vice President of the United States^{(2)} 1836	Succeeded by Littleton Tazewell^{(3)}
Notes and references
1. The Democratic-Republican nominee split this year between Smith and John Calhoun.; 2. The Democratic nominee split this year between Smith and Richard Johnson.; 3. The Democratic nominee was split this year between three candidates.
