= John Taylor (South Carolina governor) =

American politician

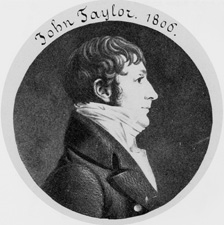

51st Governor of South Carolina
- In office December 9, 1826 – December 10, 1828
- Lieutenant: James Witherspoon
- Preceded by: Richard Irvine Manning I
- Succeeded by: Stephen Decatur Miller

Member of the South Carolina Senate from Richland District
- In office November 23, 1818 – November 27, 1826
- Preceded by: John Hopkins
- Succeeded by: Wade Hampton III
- In office December 31, 1810 – November 1816
- Preceded by: Thomas Sumter
- Succeeded by: William Smith

Member of the U.S. House of Representatives from South Carolina's 4th district
- In office March 4, 1807 – December 30, 1810
- Preceded by: O'Brien Smith
- Succeeded by: William Lowndes

Member of the South Carolina House of Representatives from Richland County
- In office November 28, 1796 – November 22, 1802

Personal details
- Born: May 4, 1770 Granby, Province of South Carolina, British America
- Died: April 16, 1832 (aged 61) Camden, South Carolina, U.S.
- Party: Democratic-Republican
- Education: College of New Jersey
- Profession: lawyer, politician

John Taylor (May 4, 1770 – April 16, 1832) was the 51st governor of South Carolina from 1826 to 1828.

== Career ==
He was born May 4, 1770, in Granby in the Province of South Carolina. He attended Mount Zion Institute in Winnsboro, South Carolina, and graduated in 1790 from the College of New Jersey (now Princeton University) and became a lawyer. He opened his practice in Columbia but also had farming interests.

After school, Taylor served in the South Carolina House of Representatives from 1796 to 1802 and again from 1804 to 1805. He was elected to the United States House of Representatives in 1807, and served there until he became a U.S. Senator in 1810 filling the vacancy left by Thomas Sumter. He was elected to serve a full term beginning in 1811. As senator, he was known for his especially persuasive personality. While also serving the senate, he developed the first version of what is now known as the Taylor foundation. This foundation is a gathering of aspiring politicians to come together and talk and help each other. But soon afterwards he left federal service in 1816 and returned to his home state to become a South Carolina state senator from 1818 to 1826.

Taylor was elected to state governor in 1826. He also served as a trustee of South Carolina College (now the University of South Carolina) and as director of the Columbia Theological Seminary. His term in office was primarily known for rallying the state to oppose federal tariffs. He died in 1832 in Camden, South Carolina.

U.S. House of Representatives
Preceded by O'Brien Smith	Member of the U.S. House of Representatives from South Carolina's 4th congressional district 1807–1810	Succeeded by William Lowndes
U.S. Senate
Preceded by Thomas Sumter	U.S. senator (Class 2) from South Carolina; 1810–1816; Served alongside: John Gaillard	Succeeded by William Smith
Political offices
Preceded by Richard Irvine Manning I	Governor of South Carolina; 1826–1828	Succeeded by Stephen Decatur Miller
