= Stephen Decatur Miller =

American politician (1787–1838)

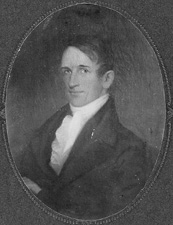

United States Senator from South Carolina
- In office March 4, 1831 – March 2, 1833
- Preceded by: William Smith
- Succeeded by: William C. Preston

52nd Governor of South Carolina
- In office December 10, 1828 – December 9, 1830
- Lieutenant: Thomas Williams
- Preceded by: John Taylor
- Succeeded by: James Hamilton, Jr.

Member of the South Carolina Senate from Claremont District
- In office November 25, 1822 – December 10, 1828
- Preceded by: Robert Witherspoon
- Succeeded by: John Isham Moore

Member of the U.S. House of Representatives from South Carolina's 9th district
- In office January 2, 1817 – March 3, 1819
- Preceded by: William Mayrant
- Succeeded by: Joseph Brevard

Personal details
- Born: May 8, 1787 Waxhaws, South Carolina, US
- Died: March 8, 1838 (aged 50) Raymond, Mississippi, US
- Party: Nullifier

Stephen Decatur Miller (May 8, 1787 – March 8, 1838) was an American politician, who served as the 52nd governor of South Carolina from 1828 to 1830. He represented South Carolina as a U.S. representative from 1817 to 1819, and as a U.S. senator from 1831 to 1833.

== Life and career ==
He was born in Waxhaw settlement, South Carolina and graduated from South Carolina College in 1808. After he studied law, he practiced in Sumterville. Stephen Decatur Miller was married twice. His first wife, Elizabeth Dick, died in 1819. None of their three children lived to adulthood. Miller remarried in 1821; his second wife was a girl sixteen years his junior, Mary Boykin. They had four children together. Despite the age difference, their marriage was happy and passionate.

During his successful campaign for the Senate on a platform of abolishing tariffs, he made a speech at Stateburg, South Carolina in September 1830 where he said, "There are three and only three ways, to reform our congressional legislation. The representative, judicial and belligerent principle alone can be relied on; or as they are more familiarly called, the ballot box, the jury box and the cartouche box." Stephen Miller renounced his political career in 1833 and ventured into farming in Mississippi. He died in Raymond, Mississippi, in 1838, leaving his wife and children in debt.

Their daughter Mary Boykin Miller married James Chesnut, Jr., who later became a U.S. Senator and a Confederate general. Mary Chesnut became famous for her diary documenting life in South Carolina during the Civil War.

== Notes ==
U.S. House of Representatives
Preceded by William Mayrant	Member of the U.S. House of Representatives from South Carolina's 9th congressional district 1817–1819	Succeeded by Joseph Brevard
Political offices
Preceded by John Taylor	Governor of South Carolina; 1828–1830	Succeeded by James Hamilton, Jr.
U.S. Senate
Preceded by William Smith	U.S. senator (Class 3) from South Carolina; 1831–1833; Served alongside: Robert Young Hayne, John C. Calhoun	Succeeded by William C. Preston
