= John Gaillard =

American politician

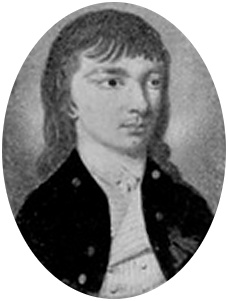

President pro tempore of the United States Senate
- In office January 25, 1820 – December 4, 1825
- Preceded by: James Barbour
- Succeeded by: Nathaniel Macon
- In office April 18, 1814 – January 5, 1819
- Preceded by: Joseph B. Varnum
- Succeeded by: James Barbour
- In office February 28, 1810 – December 11, 1810
- Preceded by: Andrew Gregg
- Succeeded by: John Pope

United States Senator from South Carolina
- In office January 31, 1805 – February 26, 1826
- Preceded by: Pierce Butler
- Succeeded by: William Harper

Personal details
- Born: September 5, 1765 Province of South Carolina
- Died: February 26, 1826 (aged 60) Washington, D.C.
- Party: Democratic-Republican

John Gaillard (September 5, 1765 – February 26, 1826) was a U.S. senator from South Carolina.

Gaillard was born in St. Stephen's district, South Carolina, on September 5, 1765. He was of Huguenot descent.

He was elected to the United States Senate in place of Pierce Butler, who resigned, and served from January 31, 1805, until his death in Washington, D.C., on February 26, 1826. During his tenure, Gaillard voted for the War of 1812. He was also the lone Democratic-Republican senator to join all Federalist senators in opposition to the final passage of the Twelfth Amendment to the United States Constitution. He served as President pro tempore of the Senate during part of the 11th Congress and at least part of every Congress from the 13th to the 18th. He was also first in the presidential line of succession from November 25, 1814, two days after the death of Vice President Elbridge Gerry, to March 4, 1817. He was the longest-serving Senator in U.S. history at the time of his death.

In his memoir Thirty Years' View, Thomas H. Benton, one of Gaillard's contemporaries, described him thus:

Urbane in his manners, amiable in temper, scrupulously impartial, uniting absolute firmness of purpose with the greatest gentleness of manners—such were the qualifications which commended him to the presidency of the senate. There was probably not an instance of disorder or a disagreeable scene in the chamber during his long-continued presidency. He classed democratically, but was as much the favorite of one side of the house as of the other, and that in the high party times of the war with Great Britain, which so much exasperated party spirit.

Gaillard died in Washington, D.C., on February 26, 1826, and was interred in the Congressional Cemetery.

== See also ==
- List of members of the United States Congress who died in office (1790–1899)

U.S. Senate
Preceded by Pierce Butler	U.S. senator (Class 3) from South Carolina; 1804–1826; Served alongside: Thomas Sumter, John Taylor, William Smith, Robert Y. Hayne	Succeeded by William Harper
Preceded by Andrew Gregg	President pro tempore of the United States Senate; February 28, 1810 – December 11, 1810	Succeeded by John Pope
Preceded by Joseph Bradley Varnum	President pro tempore of the United States Senate; November 25, 1814 – January 5, 1819	Succeeded by James Barbour
Preceded by James Barbour	President pro tempore of the United States Senate; January 25, 1820 – December 4, 1825	Succeeded by Nathaniel Macon
