= Senator Keith =

Senator Keith may refer to:

- Hastings Keith (1915–2005), Massachusetts State Senate
- Lucien Keith (1860–1933), Virginia State Senate
- Roger Keith (1888–1968), Massachusetts State Senate
- Sandy Keith (1928–2020), Minnesota State Senate
- William Keith (Louisiana politician) (born 1934), Louisiana State Senate
- Ziba Cary Keith (1842–1909), Massachusetts State Senate

== See also ==
- Gilbert Keith-Agaran (born 1962), Hawaii State Senate
