= Old Bridgewater Historical Society =

Building in Massachusetts in United States

Memorial Building
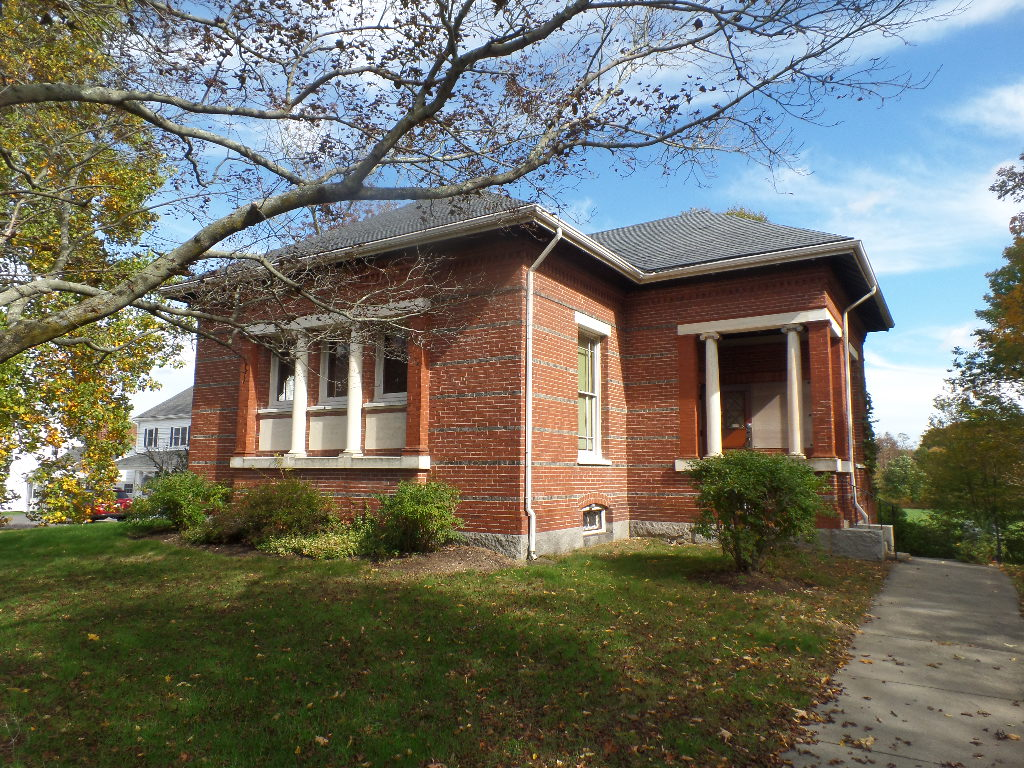
- Memorial Building
- Interactive map of the Memorial Building area

General information
- Location: 162 Howard Street; West Bridgewater, Massachusetts; 02379, United States
- Construction started: 1900
- Completed: 1901
- Management: Old Bridgewater Historical Society

The Old Bridgewater Historical Society was founded in 1894 in West Bridgewater, Massachusetts. It is a 501(c)(3) non-profit organization. The society operates from two buildings and has a library of genealogical and historical texts, manuscripts, documents, and photographs, as well as historical artifacts.

== Buildings ==
Reverend James Keith Parsonage
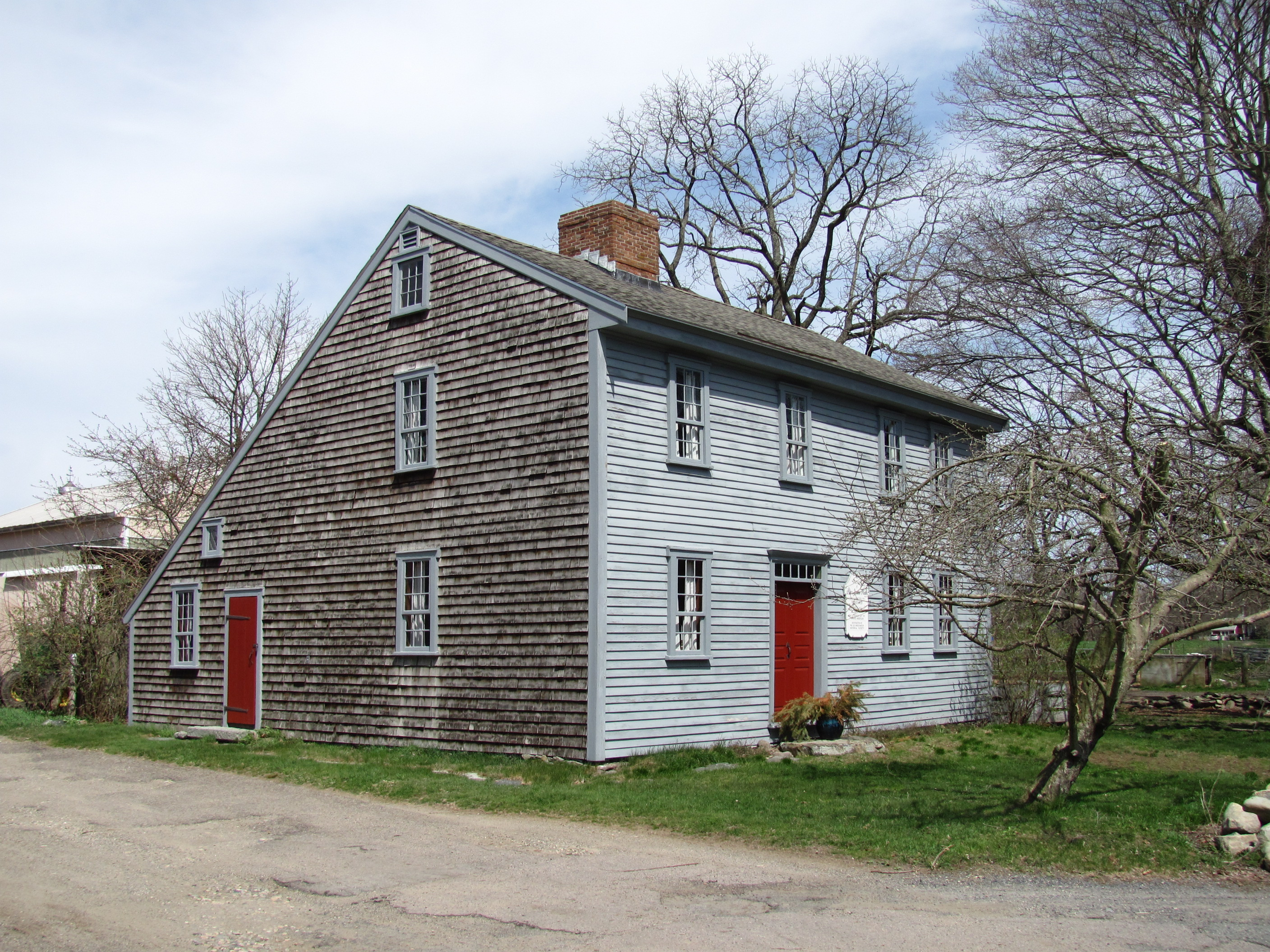
- Reverend James Keith Parsonage
- Interactive map of the Reverend James Keith Parsonage area

General information
- Architectural style: Colonial Saltbox
- Location: 199 River Street; West Bridgewater, Massachusetts; 02379, United States
- Construction started: 1662
- Completed: 1664
- Client: Proprietors of the Town of Bridgewater, MA
- Management: Old Bridgewater Historical Society

The society owns two buildings in West Bridgewater: The Memorial Building, located at 162 Howard Street, and the Keith House located around the corner at 199 River Street.

=== Memorial Building ===
Francis E. Howard, son of Capt. Benjamin Beal Howard, a resident of Howard Street in West Bridgewater, donated the property that the Memorial Building sits on in 1899, on the condition that the building cost no less than $5,000 to build. A building committee was created, consisting of Hon. Benjamin W. Harris of East Bridgewater, Dr. Loring W. Puffer of Brockton, Francis E. Howard and Charles R. Packard of West Bridgewater, Henry Gurney and Simeon C. Keith of East Bridgewater, the Hon. Ziba C. Keith of Brockton, and Joshua E. Crane and Samuel P. Gates of Bridgewater. In order to assist in raising the remaining funds needed, the Society sold marble plaques at a cost of $100 each to commemorate some of Old Bridgewater's founding families. These plaques were mounted on the interior walls of the building.

The building was designed by Boston architect firm Cooper & Bailey. It was constructed by the Brockton building company Crowell & Briggs, at a cost of approximately $8,000. Ground breaking occurred on June 29, 1900, and the building was dedicated at a ceremony on June 13, 1901.

The Memorial Building is of a colonial style of architecture. The main room contains a large open space with a stage on one end, and there is an alcove on either side, one named the Keith Alcove and the other the Howard Alcove, in honor of two of the earlier settlers of the county. The building was constructed of water struck red brick with a slate roof, in an effort to make the building and its historical holdings as safe from fire hazards as possible. A walk-out basement extends underneath the entire structure.

=== Rev. James Keith Parsonage ===
The Keith Parsonage is owned by the society and is operated as a colonial home museum. Construction of the building began in approximately the Spring of 1662, and it was originally occupied by Bridgewater's first permanent minister, the young Rev. James Keith from Scotland. The home was donated to the society on November 20,1961 by Howard and Jessie Anderson. On November 29,1961 the deed was recorded in the Plymouth County Registry of Deeds as website: https://titleview.org/plymouthdeeds/ then these search criteria: Doc.# 602393482, Book/Page 02900/117 between Anderson Howard and Old Bridgewater Historical Society.

== History ==
The society was founded in 1894 and incorporated on July 18, 1895. The original officers were: Benjamin W. Harris (president), Frank E. Sweet (secretary), Isaac N. Nutter (treasurer), Francis E. Howard, Loring W. Puffer, George M. Hooper, Joshua E. Crane, Capt. Benjamin Beal Howard, and Hosea Kingman.

=== Society presidents ===
- Benjamin W. Harris 1895-1905
- Loring Puffer 1905-1907
- Robert O. Harris 1907-1913
- G. E. Dyer 1913-1921
- Charles E. Lovell 1921-1924
- Edward Keith 1924-1926
- Abner Braley 1926-1938
- Percival Churchill 1938-1939
- Walter Stephens 1939-1945
- Edmund Nutter 1945-1950
- Laurist W. Reynolds 1950-1957
- Ralph S. Bates 1957-1976
- Robert E. Ashley 1976-1977
- Robert D. Bevis 1977-1980
- Francis J. Beary 1980-1985
- Diana Lothrop 1985-1989
- James F. Buckley 1989-1990
- Lawrence "Larry" Conant 1990-1995
- Diana Lothrop 1995-1999
- Maureen Lynn 1999-2016
- Shellie Karol-Chik 2016–2021
- Mary O'Connell 2021-Present

== See also ==
- List of historical societies in Massachusetts
