= List of mayors of Brockton, Massachusetts =

This is a list of the past and present mayors and city managers of Brockton, Massachusetts.

== Mayors ==
#	Mayor	Picture	Term	Party	Notes
1st	Ziba Cary Keith		1882–1883	Republican	
2nd	Henry H. Packard		1883–1884		
3rd	Ziba Cary Keith		1884–1885	Republican	
4th	John J. Whipple		1886–1887	Republican	
5th	Albert R. Wade		1888–1889		
6th	William Lewis Douglas		1890–1891	Democrat	
7th	Ziba Cary Keith		1892–1893	Republican	
8th	John J. Whipple		1894–1895		
9th	Charles Williamson		1896–1897		
10th	Henry E. Garfield		1898–1898		
11th	Emery M. Low		1899–1899		
12th	Charles H. Coulter		1900–1901	Socialist Party of America	
13th	David W. Battles		1902–1902		
14th	Edward H. Keith		1904–1905		
15th	Fred O. Bradford		1905–1906		
16th	John S. Kent		1907–1909		
17th	William H. Clifford		1910–1910		
18th	Harry C. Howard		1911–1912		
19th	Charles M. Hickey		1913–1913		
20th	Harry C. Howard		1914–1914		
21st	John S. Burbank		1915–1916		
22nd	Stewart B. McLeod		1917–1917		
23rd	William M. Gleason		1918–1920		
24th	Roger Keith		1921–1922		
25th	Frank A. Manning		1923		
26th	William A. Bullivant		1924–1925	Republican	
27th	Harold D. Bent		1926–1931	Republican	
28th	Horace C. Baker		1932–1935	Republican	
29th	Lawrence E. Crowley		1936–1937	Democrat	
30th	Fred D. Rowe		1938–1941	Republican	
31st	Joseph H. Downey		1942 – November 3, 1949	Democrat	Died in office
Acting	Thomas J. Mullins		November 3, 1949 – January 2, 1950		City Council President. Served as acting mayor following the death of Joseph H. Downey.
32nd	Melvin B. Clifford		1950–1951	Republican	
33rd	C. Gerald Lucey		1952–1955	Democrat	
34th	Hjalmar Peterson		1956–1957	Republican	Last Mayor before the City Manager form of government was established under a Massachusetts Plan D Charter.
35th	Wilfred A. Derosier		1958–1959		First Ceremonial Mayor appointed under Plan D form of Government
36th	Leonard H. Ellershaw		1960–1961		Last Ceremonial Mayor appointed under Plan D form of Government
37th	F. Milton McGrath		1962–1963	Democrat	First Mayor after the City Manager form of government was abolished.
38th	Alvin Jack Sims		1964–1967	Republican	
39th	John E. Sullivan		1968–1971	Democrat	
40th	Richard L. Wainwright		1972–1973	Republican	
41st	David E. Crosby		1974–1982	Democrat	Last mayor elected in partisan election. Served as interim mayor from January to June 1982 while the results of the 1981 election were challenged in court.
42nd	Paul V. Studenski		June 1982 – January 1984		First mayor elected in nonpartisan election. Elected in special election after the result of the 1981 mayor election was thrown out by the State Appeals Court.
43rd	Carl D. Pitaro		1984–1992		
44th	Winthrop Farwell, Jr.		1992–1996		
45th	Jack Yunits		1996–2006		
46th	James E. Harrington		2006–2010		
47th	Linda Balzotti		2010–2014		
48th	William Carpenter		2014–July 2, 2019		Died in office
Acting	Moises Rodrigues		July 2, 2019 – January 6, 2020		Councilor-At-Large. Served as acting mayor following the death of William Carpenter.
49th	Robert F. Sullivan		January 6, 2020–January 5, 2026		
50th	Moises Rodrigues		January 5, 2026–		

== City managers ==
From 1958 to 1961, Brockton was led by a City Manager under the Plan D form of government.

#	City Manager	Term	Notes
1st	William A. Gildea	1958–1961	
Temporary	Melvin B. Clifford	1961–1961	City Clerk. Named temporary manager after City Council fired Gildea. Removed from office after a judge ruled that Gildea was to be reinstated.
2nd	William A. Gildea	1961–1961	
Acting	Melvin B. Clifford	1961–1962	Named acting city manager after decision reinstating Gildea was overturned.

== See also ==
- Brockton history
