= William D. Weeks =

American politician

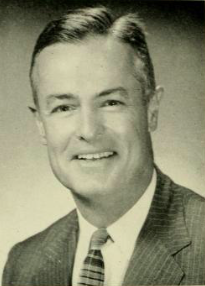

Member of the Massachusetts Senate from the Plymouth and Norfolk District
- In office 1964–1970

Personal details
- Born: 1926 Newton, Massachusetts
- Died: August 17, 2023 (aged 96–97) Cohasset, Massachusetts
- Party: Republican
- Education: Harvard College (BA); University of Virginia (JD)

William D. Weeks (1926 – August 17, 2023) was an American politician who served as Member of the Massachusetts Senate from the Plymouth and Norfolk District. He also ran for the United States House of Representatives in 1970 and 1972, losing to Hastings Keith and Gerry Studds.
