= Harry C. Howard =

American politician (1877–1928)

Mayor of Brockton, Massachusetts
- In office 1914
- Preceded by: Charles M. Hickey
- Succeeded by: John S. Burbank
- In office 1911–1912
- Preceded by: William H. Clifford
- Succeeded by: Charles M. Hickey

Personal details
- Born: April 23, 1877 Brockton, Massachusetts, U.S.
- Died: May 13, 1928 (aged 51) Greenville, Maine, U.S.
- Party: Republican
- Education: Bryant & Stratton College

Harry Clough Howard (April 23, 1877 – May 13, 1928) was an American politician who was mayor of Brockton, Massachusetts from 1911 to 1912 and 1914.

== Early life ==
Howard was born in Brockton on April 23, 1877. His father, George Howard, was a contractor and Howard learned bricklaying under him. He attended Bryant & Stratton College in Boston and became a partner in his father's firm – George Howard and Sons. On May 4, 1898, Howard married Alice Carver. They had one child.

== Politics ==
Howard was a member of the Brockton board of aldermen in 1908 and 1909. He was a candidate for mayor in the 1910 election. He defeated alderman Charles S. Bragdon in the Republican caucuses and beat Democratic incumbent William H. Clifford by a plurality of 353 votes. A third candidate, Socialist Joseph D. Poltras received 1019 votes and was seen as a spoiler. Howard was reelected in 1912, receiving 4,899 votes to Clifford's 2,862 and Poltras' 1410.

In 1912, Howard was challenged for the Republican nomination by former alderman Lucius R. Churchill. Howard won the caucuses 441 votes to 297. That year's election was a four-candidate contest due to the formation of the Progressive Party. Democrat Charles M. Hickey beat Howard by 13 votes. Due to the close result, a recount was held, which upheld Hickey's victory. As most of the Progressives were former Republicans, it was believed that Howard had lost votes to Progressive candidate Charles S. Bragdon. In the 1913 election, the Progressive candidate, Charles F. Penney, performed significantly worse than Bragdon and Howard beat Hickey by a plurality of 65 votes.

Howard was the Republican nominee for the United States House of Representatives in Massachusetts's 14th congressional district in the 1914 election. He lost a close race to Richard Olney II, receiving 34.6% of the vote to Olney's 36.5%, with Progressive Henry L. Kincaide receiving 25.2%. Howard ran again in 1916, but finished a distant fourth in the Republican primary.

== Death ==
On May 13, 1928, Howard and nine other prominent citizens of Brockton took a fishing trip on Moosehead Lake in Maine. The boat struck an object, which caused the engine to stall and the craft to take on water. The boat quickly filled with water and sank. Howard and nine others drowned. Howard's body was recovered on May 18. A private funeral was held at the Howard home and burial took place at Melrose Cemetery in Brockton.
