= Brockton drownings at Moosehead Lake =

Multiple drownings in the US state of Maine in 1928

Location of Moosehead Lake in Maine

On May 13, 1928, nine prominent citizens of Brockton, Massachusetts, and a guide drowned when the boat they were traveling on sank in Moosehead Lake near Greenville, Maine.

== Sinking ==
On May 13, 1928, a fishing party of nine men from Brockton, Massachusetts, were being transported on a boat to the Tomhegan Camps in Rockwood, Maine. During the trip, the boat struck an object, which caused the engine to stall and the craft to take on water. The boat quickly filled with water and sank. One passenger, Brockton Police Department captain and former city marshal James E. Lays, was able to grab a life preserver and a piece of board that had been a seat back and swam three-quarters of a mile (1.2 km) to shore. He was the only survivor.

== Victims ==
The following people died in this incident:

- Earl P. Blake, sheriff of Plymouth County, Massachusetts, since 1919
- David Bridgewood, an eye and ear specialist
- Sam Budden, a guide and motorboat captain from Greenville, Maine
- Fred Dahlborg, chairman of the Massachusetts Highway Commission
- William F. Daley, Brockton's fire chief since 1916
- Harry C. Howard, mayor of Brockton from 1911 to 1912 and 1914
- Frank Moberg, a dentist
- Arthur F. Peterson, Brockton's city physician
- Knute S. Salander, owner of one of Brockton's largest markets
- John Sandberg, a leading businessman of Brockton

== Aftermath ==
Once Lays regained his strength, he broke into an unoccupied camp and remained there for the night. The next morning, he walked one and a half miles (2.4 km) through the woods to the West Outlet Camp and reported the accident. A search party was launched, but the only trace of the men or the boat that could be found were some coats and hats and a part of a wooden housing designed to protect passengers during inclement weather.

Due to rough waters, it was impossible to drag for bodies on May 14. Over a dozen men dragged portions of Moosehead Lake the following day, but were unable to find any bodies or locate the boat. The body of Dr. Bridgewood was discovered on May 17 and four bodies (Howard, Daley, Dahlborg, and Salander) were found the following day. The boat was located on May 18 by diver C. W. Brooks. It was raised to the surface and secured to a scow. On May 19, the bodies of Dr. Peterson and sheriff Blake were discovered by Harley Budden, a brother of the deceased captain, and Henry Perley. On June 7, a party led by Brockton mayor Harold D. Bent and Dr. Frank R. French traveled to Moosehead lake to arrange for the search for the remaining three men to be continued. Bent offered $100 ($1,875 in 2025) for each body found. Sandberg's body was found on June 8. Budden's was recovered on June 20 and the final body, that of Frank Moberg, was found the following day.

== See also ==
- List of disasters in Maine by death toll
