= C. Gerald Lucey =

American politician (1913-1989)

Mayor of Brockton, Massachusetts
- In office 1952–1956
- Preceded by: Melvin B. Clifford
- Succeeded by: Hjalmar Peterson

Member of the Massachusetts House of Representatives for the 8th Plymouth District
- In office 1947–1953
- Preceded by: Harvey Iris
- Succeeded by: James R. Lawton

Personal details
- Born: September 8, 1913 Brockton, Massachusetts
- Died: October 20, 1989 (aged 76) New Haven, Connecticut
- Party: Democratic
- Education: Providence College; Suffolk University Law School
- Profession: Salesman; Mayor; Transportation executive

C. Gerald Lucey (1913-1989) was an American politician who served as Mayor of Brockton, Massachusetts and was a member of the Massachusetts House of Representatives.

== Early life ==
Lucey was born on September 8, 1913, in Brockton. His father, Charles Lucey, served as a member of the Brockton board of aldermen and was an unsuccessful candidate for mayor. Lucey attended Brockton High School, Providence College, and Suffolk University Law School.

== Political career ==
=== Municipal office ===
In 1936, Lucey was elected to the Brockton city council. In 1937, he was an unsuccessful candidate for the Brockton board of aldermen in Ward 2. He returned to the council in 1942, but left later that year to enlist in the United States Army. He served in the 6th General Hospital in North Africa and Italy during World War II.

In 1947, Lucey was a candidate for mayor of Brockton, but lost to incumbent Joseph H. Downey. In 1951, he again ran for mayor. This time he was successful, defeating incumbent Melvin B. Clifford 14,667 votes to 14,232. During his tenure as mayor, Brockton built four junior high schools and Lucey was credited with attracting a Veterans Administration medical center to the city. Lucey was elected to a second term as mayor in 1953. He defeated Republican Paul Keith 13,958 votes to 11,911. Sticker candidate George F. Rodenbush received 2,183 votes. In 1955, Lucey was defeated in his bid for reelection by Hjalmar Peterson 17,120 votes to 12,323.

In 1963, Lucey once again ran for mayor, but was unsuccessful.

=== Massachusetts House of Representatives ===
In 1946, Lucey was elected to the Massachusetts House of Representatives. In 1952, Lucey was drafted to run for Lieutenant Governor of Massachusetts by fifty of his House colleagues. He finished a distant second place in the Democratic primary behind incumbent Charles F. Sullivan.

== Later life and death ==
After leaving office, Lucey worked as executive vice president of Peerless Transportation of Holbrook, Massachusetts. He eventually left Brockton and moved to Orange, Connecticut. Lucey died on October 20, 1989, at St. Raphael's Hospital in New Haven, Connecticut.

Lucey's niece, Claire D. Cronin, is the United States Ambassador to Ireland.

== See also ==
- Massachusetts legislature: 1947–1948, 1949–1950, 1951–1952
