= War Memorial Park (West Bridgewater, Massachusetts) =

- U.S. National Register of Historic Places
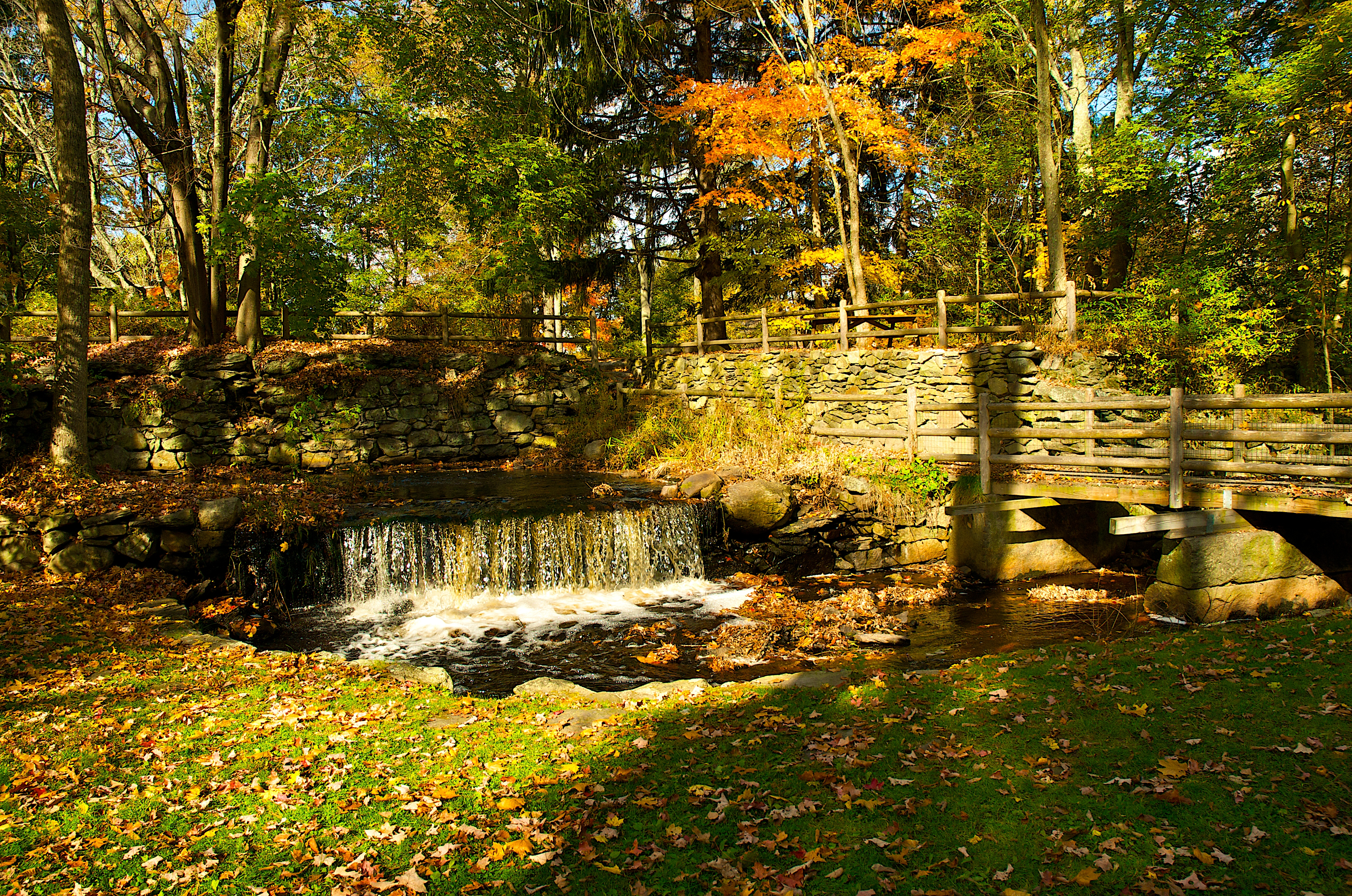

- Location within Massachusetts Location within the United States
- Location: River St., West Bridgewater, Massachusetts
- Coordinates: 42°0′59.3″N 71°0′29.8″W
- Area: 4.9 acres (2.0 ha)
- Built: 1663
- Architect: Eveline Johnson
- NRHP reference No.: 08000445
- Added to NRHP: May 21, 2008

War Memorial Park is a public park in West Bridgewater, Massachusetts. It is located south of the town center, bounded by River Street, Arch Street and the Town River.

== History ==
The park was established in the 1930s and was constructed in part with funding from the Works Progress Administration. The park is located at the site of West Bridgewater's earliest industrial activities, a mill site dating to the 17th century. This early use spawned a variety of other water-powered industrial uses in the 18th and 19th centuries, and was notably the site of Ames Shovel Company's first factory. Other industrial activities here included a sawmill, gristmill, shingle mill and even a pickle factory.

The 1936 creation of the park resulted in the donation of a large number of historic industrial artifacts, which are displayed on its grounds.

The park was listed on the National Register of Historic Places in 2008.

=== Pulpit Rock ===
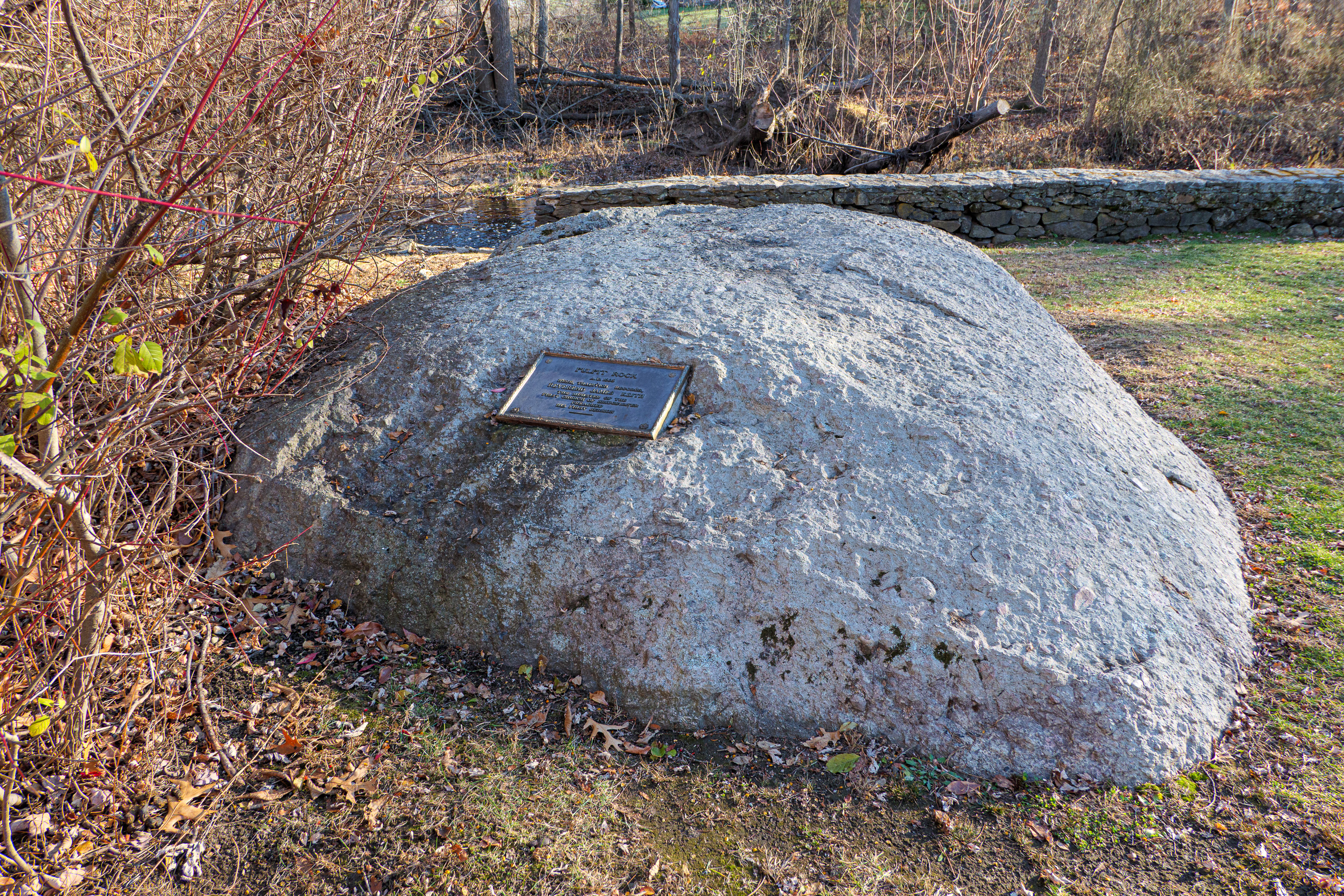
Pulpit Rock

A feature of the park is Pulpit Rock, a large boulder where Reverend James Keith, minister of the First Church of Bridgewater, is said to have preached his first sermon in 1663.

== See also ==
- National Register of Historic Places listings in Plymouth County, Massachusetts
