= H & L Bloom =

Massachusetts bus transportation company

H & L Bloom, Inc. (also operating as Bloom Bus Lines) is a private transportation company in the U.S. state of Massachusetts. The company is based out of the city of Taunton. They provide commuter services on weekdays between the Bloom Bus Terminal in Taunton and the Chinatown neighborhood of Boston. Additionally, they offer charter services and student bus services to school districts in southeastern Massachusetts.

== History ==
H&L Bloom was established in 1946 by Harry & Lillian Bloom and has evolved from the original gas station location in Taunton, MA into a multi-faceted transportation organization. Bloom consists of two companies, H & L Bloom, Inc. and Bloom's Bus Lines, Inc. H & L Bloom provides school bus transportation to Taunton and the surrounding communities, while Bloom Bus Lines operates all commuter and charter operations. They currently have a fleet of over 200 vehicles. Their garage and corporate offices are located in Taunton.

== Commuter services ==
Bloom Bus Lines currently offers regularly scheduled service to the following cities and towns:

- Boston (MA)
- West Bridgewater (MA)
- Easton (MA)
- Raynham (MA)
- Taunton (MA)

There is no public information available about daily ridership, but according to the Brockton Enterprise in 2014, the route serves anywhere from 350 to 400 passengers each day.

== See also ==
- Bristol County (MA)
- Greater Taunton Area
- Taunton (MA)
