= Reverend James Keith Parsonage =

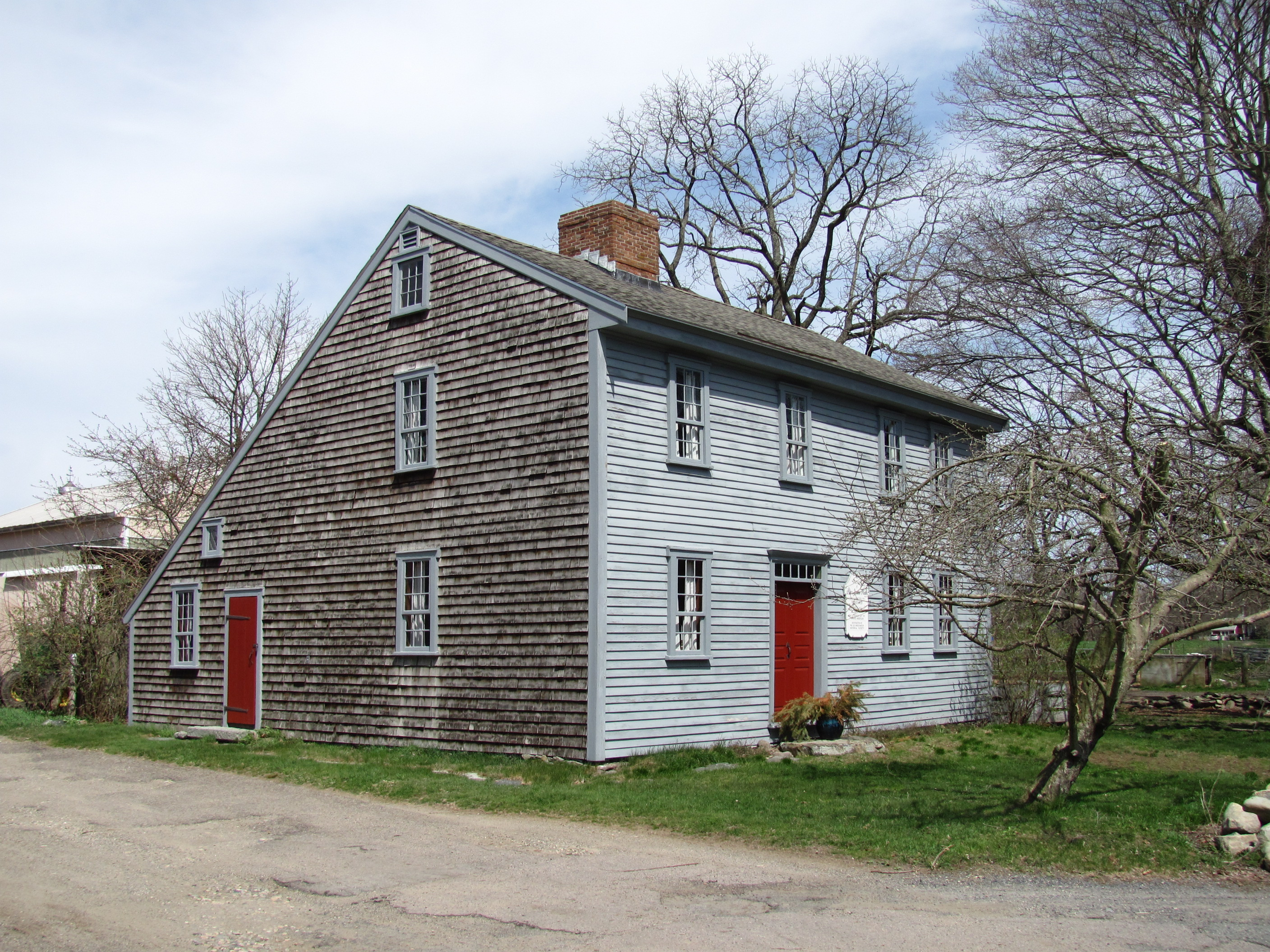
- Reverend James Keith Parsonage
- Interactive map of the Reverend James Keith Parsonage area

General information
- Architectural style: Colonial Saltbox
- Location: 199 River Street; West Bridgewater, Massachusetts; 02379, United States
- Construction started: 1662
- Completed: 1664
- Client: Proprietors of the Town of Bridgewater, MA
- Management: Old Bridgewater Historical Society

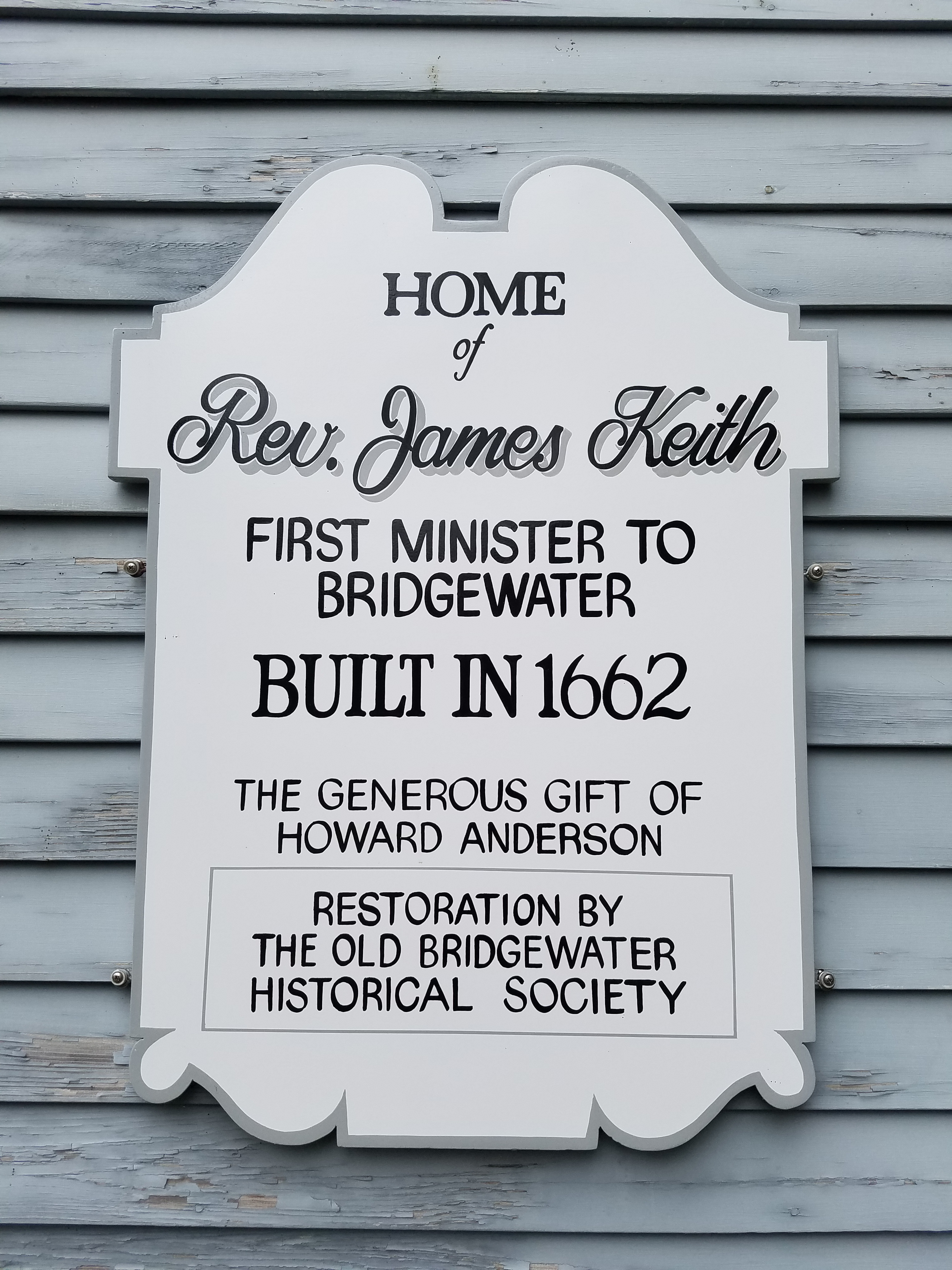
Sign on Keith Parsonage

The Reverend James Keith Parsonage, sometimes simply called the Keith House, is a 17th-century parsonage owned and maintained by the Old Bridgewater Historical Society (OBHS) in West Bridgewater, Massachusetts. It is located at 199 River Street, and is thought to be the oldest remaining parsonage in the United States.

== Construction ==
The original town proprietor records of Bridgewater show the following record dated December 28, 1661:

It is agreed upon by the Town meet together the sixth & twentieth of December that there shall be a house built for a minister upon the Townes lands where it shall be thought most-convenient & that the said house & grounds is to be freely given to the minister yt shall live & die amongst us.

It is probable that construction began on the house the following Spring of 1662, although the same proprietor records indicate the house was not finished until 1664, after a young student of Divinity, Mr. James Keith, agreed to be the town's minister following his ordination.

== Owners ==
=== Rev. James Keith ===
James Keith was born in Scotland in approximately 1642 or 1643. He was educated briefly at Marischal College in Aberdeen, Scotland. He is said to have immigrated to Boston, Massachusetts, in late 1661 or early 1662. He was made a freeman of Plymouth Colony at Plymouth, Massachusetts, on June 8, 1664.

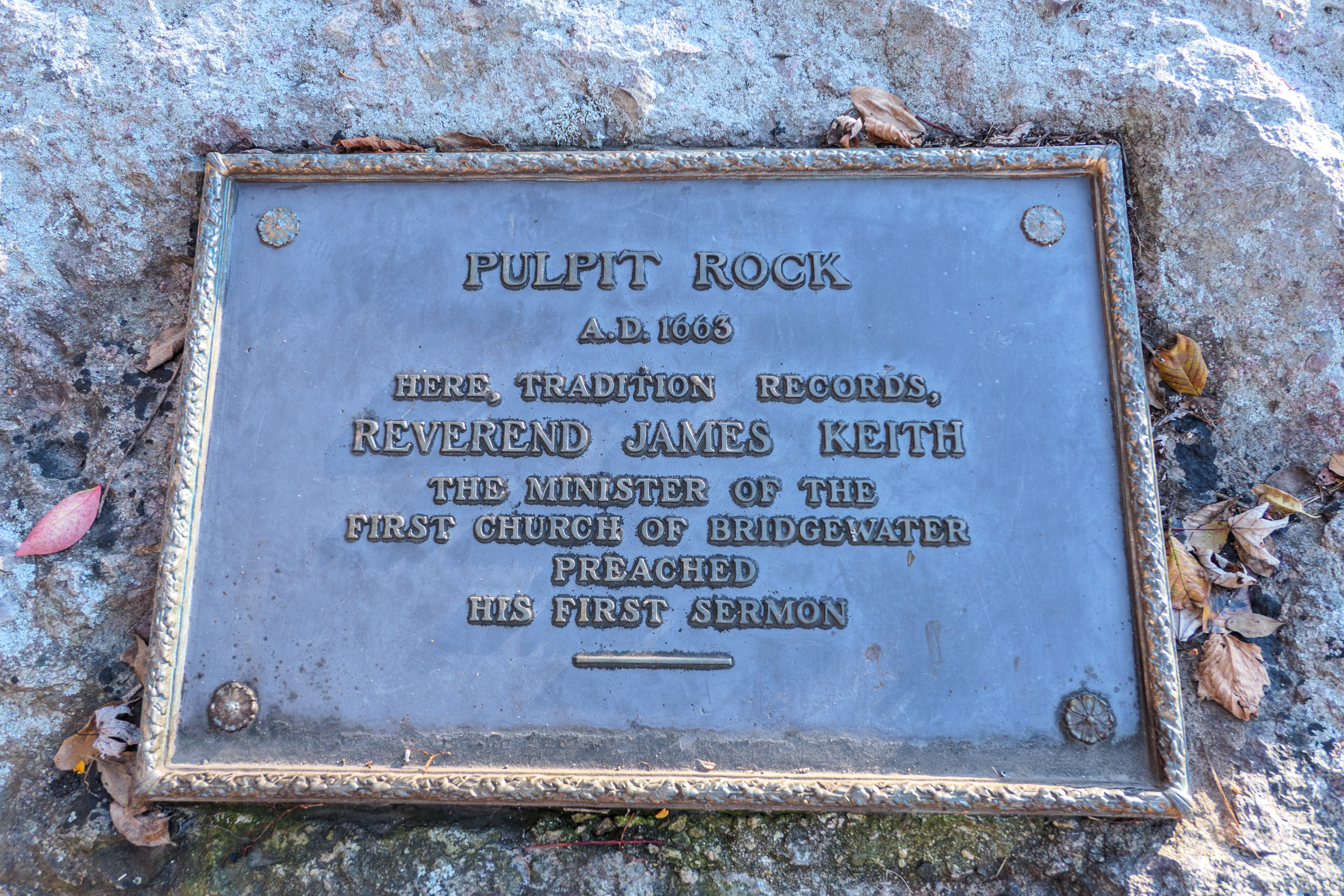
Plaque on Pulpit Rock

Oral tradition says that Keith preached his first sermon standing on Pulpit Rock in War Memorial Park, in West Bridgewater in 1663. The site is marked with a plaque.

Rev. James Keith left the house to his 7 living children in his will dated July 13, 1718, to be sold "at time convenient" and divided among them. They sold the house on March 18, 1723 to William Fobes Ephraim Fobes, Sr. (brothers) for the sum of 250£. The sale was made with the condition that James Keith's widow, Mary Macy Keith, be allowed to stay in the home until she either remarried or died.

=== Deacon Edward Fobes ===
On September 8, 1734, William Fobes sold his share of the house to his brother and co-owner, Deacon Ephraim Fobes, Sr. for the sum of 300£, making Ephraim the sole owner of the property. Five years later, on September 26, 1739, Ephraim sold the homestead to his son, Ephraim Fobes, Jr., who held the deed for almost 58 years, selling to Amasa Howard on March 14, 1792.

=== Amasa Howard ===
Amasa Howard only held the property for about five years before he died. He left it to his children in his will dated June 28, 1797. His two-year-old son, Adonis Howard, inherited the property between River Street and the Town River (today known as Pratt's Landing). His daughters, Arabella and Katherine Howard, both minors, received the property on the north side of River Street along with the house. These were the youngest owners in the home's history.

Eventually, after a series of transactions within the family, Arabella Howard, now married to Benjamin Eaton, became the sole owner of the Keith House. She died in 1833 without a will, and the county Probate Court awarded the house to her son, Benjamin Eaton, Jr. He kept the house for less than a year before selling it to Thomas Pratt on October 9, 1834.

=== The Pratt Family ===
Thomas Pratt owned the house after purchasing it from Benjamin Eaton, Jr., and by either deed or will, the house was passed to his children, Mary and George Pratt. Mary sold her interest in the property to her brother, George, in a deed dated October 10, 1881. In 1906, George died, and the property went to his second wife, Eliza Juliet Pratt. She lived in the house until her death, and left the house to her husband's grandson, Robert H. Redman in her will dated March 6, 1930. Robert Redman retained the house until September 12, 1952, when he sold it to Howard and Jessie Anderson (husband and wife).

=== Howard and Jessie Anderson ===
The Andersons owned the house for nine years. They donated it to the Old Bridgewater Historical Society on November 29, 1961.

=== The Old Bridgewater Historical Society ===
OBHS is the present owner of this historic home. They renovated of the property in the 1960s to return the home to its circa 1720 shape and layout. They currently run it as a colonial home museum.

== See also ==
- List of the oldest buildings in Massachusetts
