= Melvin B. Clifford =

American politician (1898-1987)

Mayor of Brockton, Massachusetts
- In office 1950–1951
- Preceded by: Thomas J. Mullins (acting)
- Succeeded by: C. Gerald Lucey

City Manager of Brockton, Massachusetts
- In office 1961–1961
- Preceded by: William A. Gildea
- Succeeded by: William A. Gildea
- In office 1961–1962
- Preceded by: William A. Gildea
- Succeeded by: Position abolished

Personal details
- Born: October 5, 1898 Brockton, Massachusetts
- Died: September 7, 1987 (aged 88) Brockton, Massachusetts
- Party: Republican
- Occupation: Auto mechanic Teacher; Roofing contractor Mayor; City Clerk

Melvin Bernard Clifford (October 5, 1898 – September 7, 1987) was an American politician who served as Mayor of Brockton, Massachusetts from 1950–51.

== Early life ==
Clifford was born in and grew up in Brockton. During his youth, he took part in auto races at the Brockton Fair.

== Business career ==
Clifford owned his own auto repair shop. He then worked as a Drivers Ed teacher at Brockton High School. Before becoming Mayor, Clifford worked as a roofing contractor.

== Politics ==
=== City Council ===
In 1947, Clifford was elected to the Brockton City Council in his first bid for elected office. During his tenure he fought Mayor Joseph H. Downey on many issues.

=== Mayor ===
In 1949, Clifford made a last-minute decision to challenge Downey. On November 8, 1949, Clifford defeated Thomas P. Downey 14,444 votes to 14,154. Downey was a late substitute for his brother, who died five days before the election.

Clifford was sworn in on January 2, 1950. In his inaugural address, Clifford promised economy in government, efforts to stop gambling, and an end to the misuse of city vehicles.

Clifford was defeated in his bid for reelection by Democrat C. Gerald Lucey 14,667 votes to 14,232.

=== City Clerk ===
In 1956, he was appointed City Clerk by Mayor Hjalmar Peterson. On April 20, 1961, he was named temporary city manager after William A. Gildea was fired. On November 1, a judge ruled that Gildea was to be reinstated and Clifford was to be removed from office. However, the decision was overturned on appeal and Clifford served acting manager until the position was eliminated following the inauguration of Mayor F. Milton McGrath.
