= Frank A. Manning =

American politician (1889–1949)

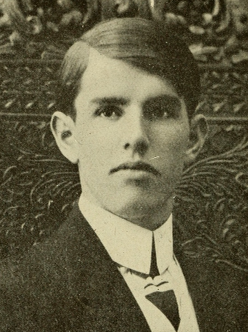
- Manning as a member of the Massachusetts House of Representatives

Mayor of Brockton, Massachusetts
- In office 1923
- Preceded by: Roger Keith
- Succeeded by: William A. Bullivant

Member of the Massachusetts House of Representatives for the 11th Plymouth district
- In office 1914–1920
- Preceded by: John P. Buckley
- Succeeded by: Frank W. Eaton

Personal details
- Born: June 26, 1889 Brockton, Massachusetts, U.S.
- Died: March 5, 1949 (aged 59) Brockton, Massachusetts, U.S.
- Party: Democratic

Frank A. Manning (June 25, 1889 – March 5, 1949) was an American politician who was a member of the Massachusetts House of Representatives from 1914 to 1920 and mayor of Brockton, Massachusetts in 1923.

== Early life ==
Manning was born on June 25, 1889, in Brockton. He attended Brockton Public Schools and worked at the L. Q. White shoe factory in Bridgewater, Massachusetts. While serving in the House, Manning started an automobile supply business.

== Politics ==
Manning was a member of the Brockton common council from 1911 to 1913. From 1914 to 1920, he represented the 11th Plymouth District in the Massachusetts House of Representatives.

Manning was the Democratic nominee for mayor of Brockton in 1920 and 1921, but lost both times to Roger Keith. In 1922, he defeated state senator Edward N. Dahlborg 12,152 votes to 9,817 in the most decisive mayoral contest in 20 years. He was the eighth Democratic mayor in the city's history. The Democrats also won a majority on the board of aldermen and common council.

During Manning's term, a group of shoe workers broke away from the Boot and Shoe Workers' Union and formed the Brockton District Shoe Workers' Union. The new union went on strike in May, demanding a pay increase, arbitration of disputes by a local board rather than the state board of conciliation and arbitration, and the cancellation of the Boot and Shoe Workers' contract with Brockton factories. The Brockton manufacturers refused to recognize the new union. On July 7, Brockton's city solicitor ruled that the picketing by striking workers was illegal, which led to clashes between strikers and the police. Manning attempted to settle the strike, but the manufacturers refused to meet with the mayor and striking workers. Manning met with the workers on July 14 and demanded they honor the Boot and Shoe Workers' existing contract and return to work. He refused to grant the strikers permits to picket or hold mass meetings. The strike ended on July 31, when the strikers voted almost unanimously to return to work without a settlement. The Brockton District Shoe Workers' Union worked to defeat Manning in that December's election. Manning was beaten by William A. Bullivant 11,970 votes to 10,130 and the Republicans gained majorities on the board of aldermen and common council. Manning was the Democratic nominee in the 1925 mayoral election, but lost to Harold D. Bent by 2,495 votes.

Manning was the Democratic nominee for the United States House of Representatives seat in Massachusetts's 14th congressional district in the 1926 election. He lost to Republican incumbent Louis A. Frothingham 66% to 34%.

== Later life ==
In 1943, Manning was appointed to Brockton's liquor licence commission. He broke his leg in the summer of 1948 and remained in poor health until his death on March 5, 1949.
