= Gerry Studds =

American politician (1937–2006)

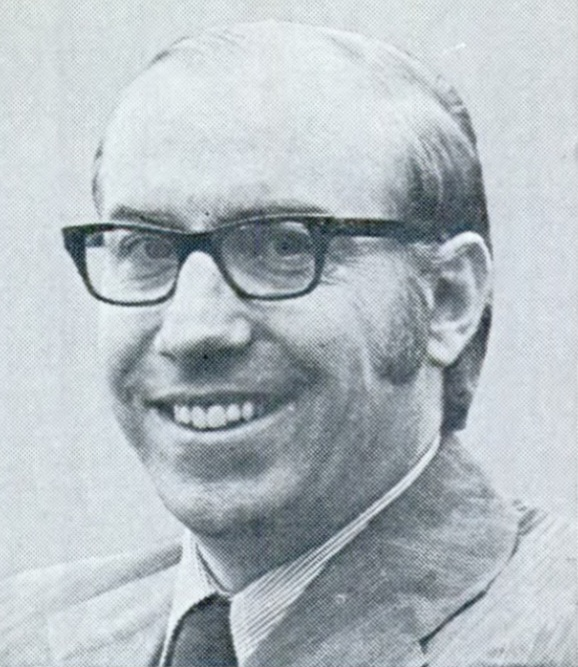

Member of the U.S. House of Representatives from Massachusetts
- In office January 3, 1973 – January 3, 1997
- Preceded by: Hastings Keith
- Succeeded by: Bill Delahunt
- Constituency: 12th district (1973–1983); 10th district (1983–1997)

Personal details
- Born: Gerry Eastman Studds; May 12, 1937 Mineola, New York, U.S.
- Died: October 14, 2006 (aged 69) Boston, Massachusetts, U.S.
- Party: Democratic
- Spouse: Dean Hara (m. 2004)
- Education: Yale University (BA, MA)
- Gerry Studds's voice Studds, as chair of the House Merchant Marine Committee, speaks in support of H.R.4615, the Olympic Experimental State Forest Act; Recorded August 11, 1992

Gerry Eastman Studds (/ˈɡɛri/ GHERR-ee; May 12, 1937 – October 14, 2006) was an American politician from Massachusetts who served as a Democratic member of the United States House of Representatives from 1973 until 1997. He was the first member of Congress to be openly gay. In 1983, Studds was censured by the House for having sex with a 17-year-old page.

== Early life and career ==
Gerry Studds was born in Mineola, New York, to Elbridge Gerry Eastman Studds (an architect who helped design the FDR Drive in New York City) and the former Beatrice Murphy. He had a brother, Colin Studds, and a sister, Gaynor (Studds) Stewart. Through his father, he was a descendant of Elbridge Gerry, who served as the vice president of the United States and the governor of Massachusetts in the 1810s.

Studds obtained a full scholarship to Yale University, receiving a bachelor's degree in history in 1959 and a master's degree in 1961. While at Yale, he was a member of St. Anthony Hall. After graduating, he served in the United States Foreign Service and the Kennedy White House, where he helped develop the Peace Corps.

From 1965 to 1969, Studds taught history and politics at St. Paul's School, a prep school in New Hampshire. He attracted a following of progressive students; the official school history described him as "a lightning rod for student discontent." Guided by Studds, 182 upperclassmen wrote a letter to the school's conservative administration demanding reforms. St. Paul's implemented many of the students' demands: it de-emphasized athletics, ended mandatory attendance at Sunday chapel, and eventually began admitting female students. However, in 1969, the school encouraged Studds to leave under unclear circumstances (see After Congress), sweetening the deal by paying for him to attend the Harvard Graduate School of Education.

While teaching at St. Paul's, Studds achieved his first major political success, of a sort. In 1968, during the Vietnam War, Studds persuaded anti-war candidate Eugene McCarthy to challenge incumbent president Lyndon Johnson in the New Hampshire presidential primary. He also ran McCarthy's New Hampshire campaign operation, even though St. Paul's refused McCarthy's request to grant Studds a leave of absence so he could focus on defeating Johnson. McCarthy narrowly lost the New Hampshire primary to Johnson. Sensing weakness, Robert F. Kennedy entered the presidential race four days later, causing Johnson to retire from electoral politics.

== Career in the United States Congress ==
=== Electoral history ===
Studds made his first run for Congress in 1970, seeking election in Massachusetts' 12th congressional district. He narrowly lost to the Republican incumbent Hastings Keith. Redistricting forced Keith to retire before the 1972 election, and Studds edged out the Republican William D. Weeks by just 1,118 votes. Studds was dogged by rumors of homosexuality in the 1978 campaign, but nonetheless won re-election. In 1983, Studds was transferred to the 10th congressional district after another round of redistricting, serving until 1997.

=== 1983 congressional page scandal ===
Studds was a central figure in the 1983 congressional page sex scandal, when he and Representative Dan Crane were each separately censured by the House of Representatives for inappropriate relationships with congressional pages—in Studds' case, a 1973 sexual relationship with a 17-year-old male. In addition, two other male pages testified, and Studds confirmed, that Studds had made sexual advances to them in 1973.

During the course of the House Ethics Committee's investigation, Studds publicly acknowledged his homosexuality, thereby becoming the first openly gay member of Congress. In an address to the House, Studds said, "It is not a simple task for any of us to meet adequately the obligations of either public or private life, let alone both, but these challenges are made substantially more complex when one is, as I am, both an elected public official and gay." Although Studds disagreed with the committee's findings of improper sexual conduct, he waived his right to a public hearing in order to protect the privacy of those involved. He said that deciding not to have a hearing "presented me with the most difficult choice I have had to make in my life."

Studds defended his sexual involvement as a "mutually voluntary, private relationship between adults." At the time, he acknowledged that it had been inappropriate to engage in a relationship with a subordinate and that he had committed "a very serious error in judgment." He would later say that "It was a damn stupid and inappropriate thing to do, and I never said it wasn't." However, after Studds' death, his widower Dean Hara said that Studds had never been ashamed of the relationship. In testimony to investigators, the page testified that being Studds' sexual partner made him "somewhat uncomfortable" and that "I would [rather] have had the friendship that I had with the man without the sex," but qualified his testimony by saying that his experience with Studds was not "destructive or painful." The page also said that Studds neither offered him an inducement to sleep with him nor prevented him from ending the relationship.

The House Ethics Committee initially recommended the less punitive option of a reprimand, which would not have cost Studds his subcommittee chairmanship on the Committee on Merchant Marine and Fisheries. However, the full House raised the penalty under discussion from reprimand to censure, by a vote of 338–87. On July 20, 1983, the House voted to censure Studds, by a vote of 420–3. The three "no" votes were Bill Clay, Mervyn Dymally, and Parren Mitchell.

In 2006, following the Mark Foley page scandal, pundits compared the actions of Foley and Congress in 2006 to Studds and Congress in 1983.

=== Congressional career and political views ===
Although Studds lost his subcommittee chairmanship as a result of the page scandal, the setback was only temporary.

According to The Washington Post, Studds' sexuality "apparently was not news to many of his constituents." (His congressional district included the gay colonies of Martha's Vineyard and Provincetown.) Studds received two standing ovations from supporters in his home district at his first town meeting following his censure. He was re-elected to the House six more times after the 1983 censure and became chairman of the full Merchant Marine and Fisheries Committee in 1992.

As a member of Congress, Studds advocated for environmental and maritime issues, AIDS funding, and civil rights, particularly for gays and lesbians. He supported protectionist policies for the Massachusetts fishing industry, and in the 1970s he "largely" drafted a ban on foreign vessels fishing within 200 miles of the U.S. coast, winning him the lifelong friendship of Alaska Republican Don Young, the bill's co-author, who reportedly "hate[d] homosexuals and eastern liberals, but not Mr. Studds." In 1992 he authored the National Marine Sanctuaries Reauthorization and Improvement Act. In 1994 he joined with Ted Kennedy to introduce legislation to end discrimination based on sexual orientation in the workplace.

Throughout his life, Studds maintained the anti-war views that had spurred his initial entry into electoral politics. He was an outspoken opponent of the Strategic Defense Initiative missile defense system. He also criticized the United States government's secretive support for the Contra fighters in Nicaragua.

== After Congress ==
=== Later years and death ===
After retiring from Congress in 1997, Studds worked as a lobbyist for the fishing industry. He also served as the executive director of the New Bedford Aquarium.

Studds and partner Dean T. Hara (his companion since 1991) were married in Boston on May 24, 2004, one week after Massachusetts became the first state in the country to legalize same-sex marriage.

On October 14, 2006, Studds died at age 69 following a pulmonary embolism. Due to the federal ban on same-sex marriage, Hara was not eligible, upon Studds' death, to receive the pension provided to surviving spouses of former members of Congress. Hara later joined a federal lawsuit, Gill v. Office of Personnel Management, that successfully challenged the constitutionality of section 3 of the Defense of Marriage Act.

=== Accolades ===
When Studds retired from Congress, Don Young sponsored a bill to name the Stellwagen Bank National Marine Sanctuary after Studds. The sanctuary sits at the mouth of Massachusetts Bay.

In August 2019, Studds was added to the Rainbow Honor Walk, a walk of fame in San Francisco's Castro neighborhood honoring LGBTQ people who have "made significant contributions in their fields."

=== 2018 sexual misconduct allegations ===
In 2018, St. Paul's School published an investigative report concerning allegations of faculty-student sexual misconduct over the years. The investigators quoted two former SPS students who said that they had questionable encounters with Studds during their time at the school, and described their statements as "substantiated." One of the witnesses also relayed that according to another SPS teacher, the school fired Studds in 1969 for inappropriate conduct with students; the report did not confirm or deny this claim. (Before the report's publication, it was commonly believed that the school had encouraged Studds to leave due to his "anti-establishment views.") Another alumnus sued SPS in 2018, alleging an additional, more serious, case of sexual misconduct. A posthumous biography of Studds, published the year before SPS released the report, noted that before Studds' death, he had admitted that as a teacher, he had sometimes dealt with students "in ways that were human but neither professional nor responsible."

== See also ==
- List of LGBT members of the United States Congress
- List of federal political sex scandals in the United States
- List of United States representatives expelled, censured, or reprimanded

U.S. House of Representatives
| Preceded by Hastings Keith | Member of the U.S. House of Representatives from Massachusetts's 12th congressional district 1973–1983 | Constituency abolished |
| Preceded by Margaret Heckler | Member of the U.S. House of Representatives from Massachusetts's 10th congressional district 1983–1997 | Succeeded by Bill Delahunt |
| Preceded by Walter B. Jones Sr. | Chair of the House Merchant Marine Committee; 1992–1995 | Position abolished |
