= Joseph H. Downey =

American politician (1890–1949)

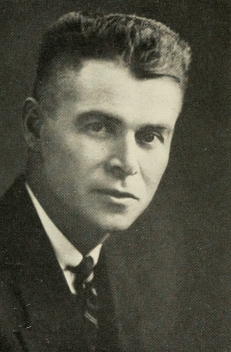
- Downey as a member of the Massachusetts House of Representatives

Mayor of Brockton, Massachusetts
- In office 1942–1949
- Preceded by: Fred D. Rowe
- Succeeded by: Thomas J. Mullins (acting)

Member of the Massachusetts House of Representatives
- In office 1931–1942
- Constituency: 9th Plymouth district (1931–1940); 8th Plymouth district (1941–1942)

Personal details
- Born: December 6, 1890 Boston, Massachusetts, U.S.
- Died: November 3, 1949 (aged 58) Brockton, Massachusetts, U.S.
- Party: Democratic

Joseph H. Downey (December 6, 1890 – November 3, 1949) was an American politician who was a member of the Massachusetts House of Representatives from 1931 to 1942 and mayor of Brockton, Massachusetts from 1942 until his death in 1949.

== Early life ==
Downey was born in Boston on December 6, 1890. His family moved to North Easton, Massachusetts when Downey was five and he attended public schools there. He later moved to Brockton, where he was a shoe cutter and foreman.

== Politics ==
Downey was a member of the Brockton common council from 1926 until 1929, when the body was abolished and replaced by a city council. Downey served as a councilor-at-large under the new charter for two years. From 1931 to 1942, he was a member of the Massachusetts House of Representatives.

In 1941, Downey defeated incumbent mayor Fred D. Rowe. He was reelected in 1943, 1945, and 1947. He was the Democratic nominee in 1949, but six days before the election, he collapsed at a political rally. He was taken to Brockton Hospital and died the following day. Downey's brother, Thomas, was late substitute, but lost to Melvin B. Clifford 14,444 votes to 14,154.
