= Roger Keith =

American politician and masonic leader (1888–1968)

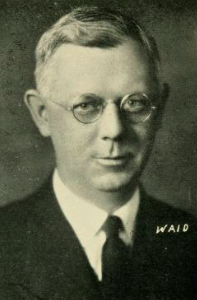
- Keith as a member of the Massachusetts Senate

Member of the Massachusetts Senate for Plymouth district
- In office 1929–1932
- Preceded by: George M. Webber
- Succeeded by: Charles Gardner Miles

Mayor of Brockton, Massachusetts
- In office 1921–1922
- Preceded by: William M. Gleason
- Succeeded by: Frank A. Manning

Personal details
- Born: May 8, 1888 New York, New York, U.S.
- Died: May 2, 1968 (aged 79) Brockton, Massachusetts, U.S.
- Party: Republican
- Children: 5, including Hastings Keith
- Education: Amherst College

Roger Keith (May 8, 1888 – May 2, 1968) was an American politician and masonic leader who was mayor of Brockton, Massachusetts from 1921 to 1922, a member of the Massachusetts Senate from 1929 to 1932, and Grand Master of the Grand Lodge of Massachusetts from 1948 to 1950.

== Early life ==
Keith was born on May 8, 1888, in New York City. His father, Horace A. Keith, was an industrialist who was active in the Republican Party and promoting amateur sports. He was a descendant of Rev. James Keith, the first minister in Bridgewater, Massachusetts.

== Business ==
Keith graduated from Amherst College in 1911. He was treasurer of the Brockton Webbing Co., a manufacturer of shoe straps that was headed by his father. He left the textile business in 1923 and joined the insurance firm of S. F. Packard & Son as a partner. He was later the senior partner of another insurance agency – Roger Keith & Sons. He was also chairman of the Peoples Savings Bank, president of Brockton Hospital, and a director of the Brockton Fair, Abington Mutual Insurance Co., and Brockton Edison Co.

== Politics ==
Keith was a member of the Brockton common council from 1917 to 1920 and was council president in 1919 and 1920. In 1920, Keith was elected mayor of Brockton, beating his Democratic opponent by 980 votes. He was reelected in 1921, defeating Frank A. Manning by 566 votes. From 1929 to 1932, Keith represented the Plymouth district in the Massachusetts Senate.

== Freemasonry ==
Keith was master of the St. George Lodge of Masons in Brockton, district deputy grand master of the Brockton 29th Masonic District, and commander of the Bay State Commandery 38. He was deputy grand master of the Grand Lodge of Massachusetts in 1946 and was installed as grand master on December 29, 1947. He was reelected in 1948 and 1949. In this position, Keith supervised 313 lodges in Massachusetts, 7 in the Panama Canal Zone, 3 in Chile, and 6 in China.

== Personal life and death ==
On April 12, 1913, Keith married Carolyn B. Hastings. They had four sons and one daughter. One of their sons was Congressman Hastings Keith.

Keith died on May 2, 1968, at the office of Roger Keith & Sons in Brockton.
