= Jack Yunits =

Mayor of Brockton

John Thomas Yunits Jr. (born January 24, 1952, in Brockton, Massachusetts) is the former mayor of Brockton, the 4th largest city in the Commonwealth of Massachusetts.

A city attorney and father of four, Yunits unseated a sitting incumbent in 1995, sweeping all of the city's 28 precincts. He was re-elected in 1997, 1999, 2001, and 2003, becoming the city's longest-serving mayor and the first in the city's history to be elected to five terms.

Yunits brought both business and civic leaders together to support a number of significant new developments, including the construction of Campanelli Stadium and the Shaw’s Center. He profoundly influenced the landscape of Brockton by fostering an atmosphere of cooperation and understanding in addressing the many complex challenges facing an older urban area. Under his leadership, dozens of new businesses moved to the city—creating and sustaining more than 2,500 jobs—and he consistently supported the arts and efforts to beautify the downtown area.

During his tenure, the city's real estate value increased by over $3 billion in total value and the median price of a single family home rose from $81,500 in 1995 to over $234,000 in 2004. Nearly 38 miles of Brockton roads were either resurfaced or improved through water and sewer infrastructure upgrades. Brockton built three new schools, and the public school system was recognized by the State's Department of Education for excellence in MCAS performance.

Yunits chose not to run for re-election in 2005, and was followed by James Harington.

A graduate of Boston College High School, Boston College, and the New England School of Law, Yunits later served as president of the Brockton Rox, a professional baseball team.
