= Ziba Cary Keith =

American politician

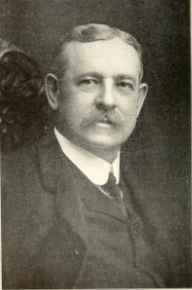

Member of the Massachusetts Executive Council First Councilor District

1st, 3rd, and 7th Mayor of Brockton, Massachusetts
- In office 1892–1893
- Preceded by: William Lewis Douglas
- Succeeded by: John J. Whipple
- In office 1884–1884
- Preceded by: Henry H. Packard
- Succeeded by: John J. Whipple
- In office January 2, 1882 – 1883
- Preceded by: Board of Selectmen
- Succeeded by: Henry H. Packard

Member of the Brockton, Massachusetts Board of Selectmen
- In office 1875–1877

Member of the Massachusetts Senate Second Plymouth District
- In office 1887–1888

Member of the Massachusetts House of Representatives
- In office 1875–1877

Personal details
- Born: July 13, 1842 Brockton, Massachusetts
- Died: April 5, 1909 (aged 66) Brockton, Massachusetts
- Party: Republican
- Spouse: Abbie F. Jackson

Ziba Cary Keith (13 July 1842 – 5 April 1909) was a Massachusetts businessman and politician who served in both houses of the Massachusetts Legislature, as the first, third, and seventh Mayor of Brockton, Massachusetts and as a member of the Massachusetts Executive Council.

Keith was born on July 13, 1842 in Brockton, Massachusetts when it was known as North Bridgewater, Massachusetts. Keith was educated in the local schools and at the Pierce Academy in Middleborough, Massachusetts.

Keith married Abbie F. Jackson, daughter of Oliver Jackson, on July 13, 1865.

In December 1881 Keith was elected the first mayor of Brockton, Massachusetts, he was sworn in on the first Monday in January 1882.

He died in 1909 after a short illness.

== See also ==
- 1875 Massachusetts legislature
- 1876 Massachusetts legislature

Political offices
Preceded by Chairman of the Board of Selectmen	1st Mayor of Brockton, Massachusetts; 1882-1883	Succeeded by Henry H. Packard
Preceded by Henry H. Packard	3rd Mayor of Brockton, Massachusetts; 1884-1885	Succeeded by John J. Whipple
Preceded by William Lewis Douglas	7th Mayor of Brockton, Massachusetts; 1892-1893	Succeeded by John J. Whipple
