= Hastings Keith =

American politician (1915–2005)

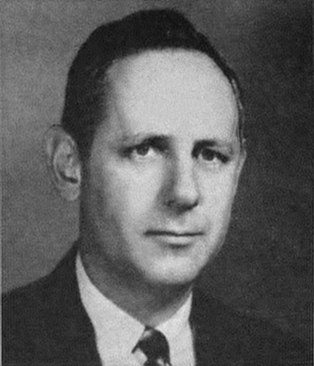

Member of the U.S. House of Representatives from Massachusetts
- In office January 3, 1959 – January 3, 1973
- Preceded by: Donald W. Nicholson
- Succeeded by: Gerry Studds
- Constituency: 9th district (1959–1963); 12th district (1963–1973)

Personal details
- Born: November 22, 1915 Brockton, Massachusetts, U.S.
- Died: July 19, 2005 (aged 89) Brockton, Massachusetts, U.S.
- Resting place: Union Cemetery; Brockton, Massachusetts
- Party: Republican
- Education: University of Vermont; Harvard University

Military service
- Allegiance: United States of America
- Branch/service: United States Army; United States Army Reserve
- Rank: Colonel
- Battles/wars: World War II
- Awards: World War II Victory

Hastings Keith (November 22, 1915 – July 19, 2005) was a United States representative from Massachusetts.

Keith was born in Brockton, Massachusetts, on November 22, 1915. His father, Roger Keith, was mayor of Brockton and a member of the Massachusetts Senate. Keith graduated from Brockton High School, Deerfield Academy, and the University of Vermont in 1938. He performed graduate work at Harvard University. He was a member of the faculty of the Boston University Evening College of Commerce.

In 1933, he was a student in the Citizens' Military Training Camps. He served as a battery officer in the Massachusetts National Guard. During the Second World War, he served in the United States Army with eighteen months' overseas service in Europe. Keith was a graduate of the Command and General Staff School and was a colonel in the US Army Reserve. He was a salesman and later district manager for the Equitable Life Assurance Society in Boston. He was a member of the Massachusetts Senate, a partner in a general insurance firm in Brockton, and was an unsuccessful candidate for the Republican nomination for Congress in 1956.

He was elected as a Republican to the Eighty-sixth and to the six succeeding Congresses (January 3, 1959 – January 3, 1973). On April 19, 1974, President Nixon appointed Hastings Keith of Massachusetts as a Member of the Defense Manpower Commission. He was not a candidate for reelection in 1972 to the Ninety-third Congress, but was a candidate for nomination in 1992 to the One Hundred Third Congress until he withdrew from the race. He died in Brockton on July 19, 2005. He was buried at Union Cemetery in Brockton.

== See also ==
- 1953–1954 Massachusetts legislature
- 1955–1956 Massachusetts legislature

U.S. House of Representatives
Preceded by Donald W. Nicholson	Member of the U.S. House of Representatives from Massachusetts's 9th congressional district January 3, 1959 – January 3, 1963	Succeeded by John W. McCormack
Preceded by John W. McCormack	Member of the U.S. House of Representatives from Massachusetts's 12th congressional district January 3, 1963 – January 3, 1973	Succeeded by Gerry Studds
