= John Dean Dickinson =

American politician

Member of the U.S. House of Representatives from New York
- In office March 4, 1827 – March 3, 1831
- Preceded by: William McManus
- Succeeded by: Job Pierson
- Constituency: 9th district
- In office March 4, 1819 – March 3, 1823
- Preceded by: John P. Cushman
- Succeeded by: Stephen Van Rensselaer
- Constituency: 10th district

Personal details
- Born: June 28, 1767 Middletown, Connecticut Colony, British America
- Died: January 28, 1841 (aged 73) Troy, New York, U.S.
- Resting place: Oakwood Cemetery
- Party: Anti-Jacksonian (1829-1831)
- Other political affiliations: Federalist (1819-1823); Adams (1827-1829)
- Education: Yale College

John Dean Dickinson (June 28, 1767 – January 28, 1841) was a U.S. representative from New York.

== Biography ==
Dickinson was born in Middletown in the Connecticut Colony. He completed preparatory studies and graduated from Yale College in 1785, and in 1790 he moved to Lansingburgh, New York.

He was admitted to the bar in April 1791, and commenced the practice of law in Lansingburgh.

Dickinson moved to Troy, New York, and served as president of the Farmers' Bank of Troy, New York, from the bank's foundation in 1801 until his death in 1841.

Dickinson was a director and founder of the Rensselaer & Saratoga Insurance Co. in 1814. He served as a member of the New York State Assembly from November 1816 to April 1817, and was the first president of the Troy Lyceum of Natural History in 1818.

Dickinson was elected as a Federalist to the Sixteenth and Seventeenth Congresses from March 4, 1819 to March 3, 1823. He was one of the original trustees of the Rensselaer Polytechnic Institute in 1824.

He served as a member of the committee which received Lafayette on his visits to Troy in 1824 and 1825.

Dickinson was elected as an Adams candidate to the Twentieth Congress from March 4, 1827 to March 3, 1829. He was reelected as an Anti-Jacksonian to the Twenty-first Congress from March 4, 1829 to March 3, 1831.

After serving in Congress, Dickinson resumed the practice of law in Troy, and died there on January 28, 1841. He is interred at Oakwood Cemetery.

U.S. House of Representatives
Preceded by John P. Cushman	Member of the U.S. House of Representatives from New York's 10th congressional district 1819–1823	Succeeded by Stephen Van Rensselaer
Preceded by William McManus	Member of the U.S. House of Representatives from New York's 9th congressional district 1827–1831	Succeeded by Job Pierson
