= John E. Wool =

United States Army general (1784–1869)

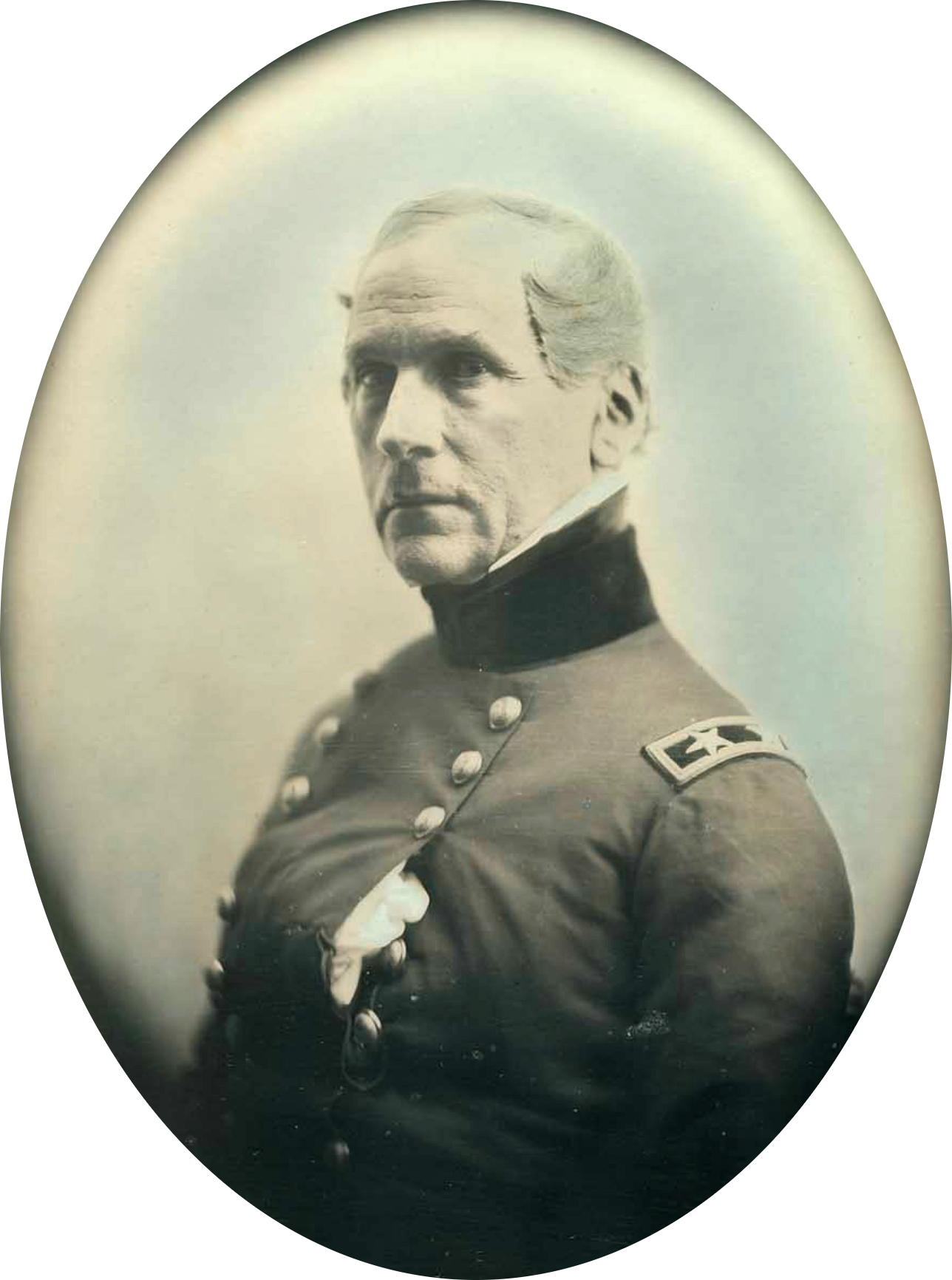
- Daguerreotype of General John E. Wool by Southworth & Hawes in 1850
- Born: February 20, 1784; Newburgh, New York, US
- Died: November 10, 1869 (aged 85); Troy, New York, US
- Burial place: Oakwood Cemetery
- Military career
- Allegiance: United States of America
- Branch: United States Army
- Service years: 1812–1863
- Rank: Major General
- Commands: Department of the East; Department of the Pacific; Department of Virginia; VIII Corps
- Conflicts: War of 1812; Battle of Queenston Heights (WIA); Battle of Plattsburgh; Mexican–American War; Battle of Buena Vista; Rogue River Wars; American Civil War; Capture of Norfolk; New York City Draft Riots
- Awards: Thanks of Congress

John Ellis Wool (February 20, 1784 – November 10, 1869) was an American military officer in the United States Army during three consecutive American-involved wars: the War of 1812 (1812–1815), the Mexican–American War (1846–1848), and with allegiance to the Union in the American Civil War (1861–1865). He also participated in the American Indian Wars and the Trail of Tears, that resulted in Indian tribes being forcefully marched westward in the 1830s from the Southeast US beyond the Mississippi River into the newly established Indian Territory (The modern state of Oklahoma). By the 1840s, he was widely considered one of the most capable officers in the United States Army and an excellent organizer.

He was one of the five highest general officers (along with Winfield Scott, David E. Twiggs, William S. Harney, and Joseph E. Johnston) of the United States Army on the eve of the American Civil War in 1861. When the Civil War began on April 12, 1861, General Wool, then aged 77 and ranked as a brigadier general for the past 20 peace-time years, commanded the Department of the East. He was the oldest general on either side of the ensuing Civil War.

== Early life and education ==
John Ellis Wool was born in Newburgh, New York. When he was orphaned at an early age, he went to live with his grandfather, James Wool, in Troy, New York. He attended a local school and, at the age of twelve, began working at a store in Troy. He later read law with an established firm in order to learn and be admitted to the bar. His family was of Dutch descent.

== War of 1812 ==
At the outbreak of the War of 1812, Wool was a practicing attorney in Troy, New York.

When he volunteered at the age of 28, he was commissioned as a captain in the 13th United States Infantry Regiment on April 14, 1812. He fought at the Battle of Queenston Heights in 1812, where he was shot through his thighs. During the action, he led a group of American soldiers up a fisherman's path to the British artillery stationed on top of the heights. In the face of an infantry charge led by famed British general Isaac Brock, he rallied his men and they held their ground. The attack was repulsed, in which action Brock died. However, the Americans eventually lost the battle.

After recovering from his wound, Wool was promoted major of the 29th United States Infantry Regiment on April 13, 1813, which he led with distinction at the Battle of Plattsburgh in 1814. After the battle, he was a major of the 6th United States Infantry as of May 17, 1815. As this war was coming to an end, John Ellis Wool was promoted to the rank of Brevet Lieutenant Colonel on September 11, 1814.

== Staying on with the U.S. Army ==
An orphan with little formal education, Wool remained in the military service and was promoted to colonel and Inspector General of the Army on April 29, 1816. He was sent to Europe in 1832 to observe foreign military organizations and operations. He also participated in the removal of the Cherokee from Georgia and Tennessee in the 1830s. As part of this effort, he established Fort Butler at present-day Murphy, North Carolina, as the eastern headquarters of the military removal of the Cherokee. In 1841, Wool was promoted to brigadier general in the U.S. Army and years later in 1847 made commander of the Department of the East.

== Mexican–American War and Oregon ==
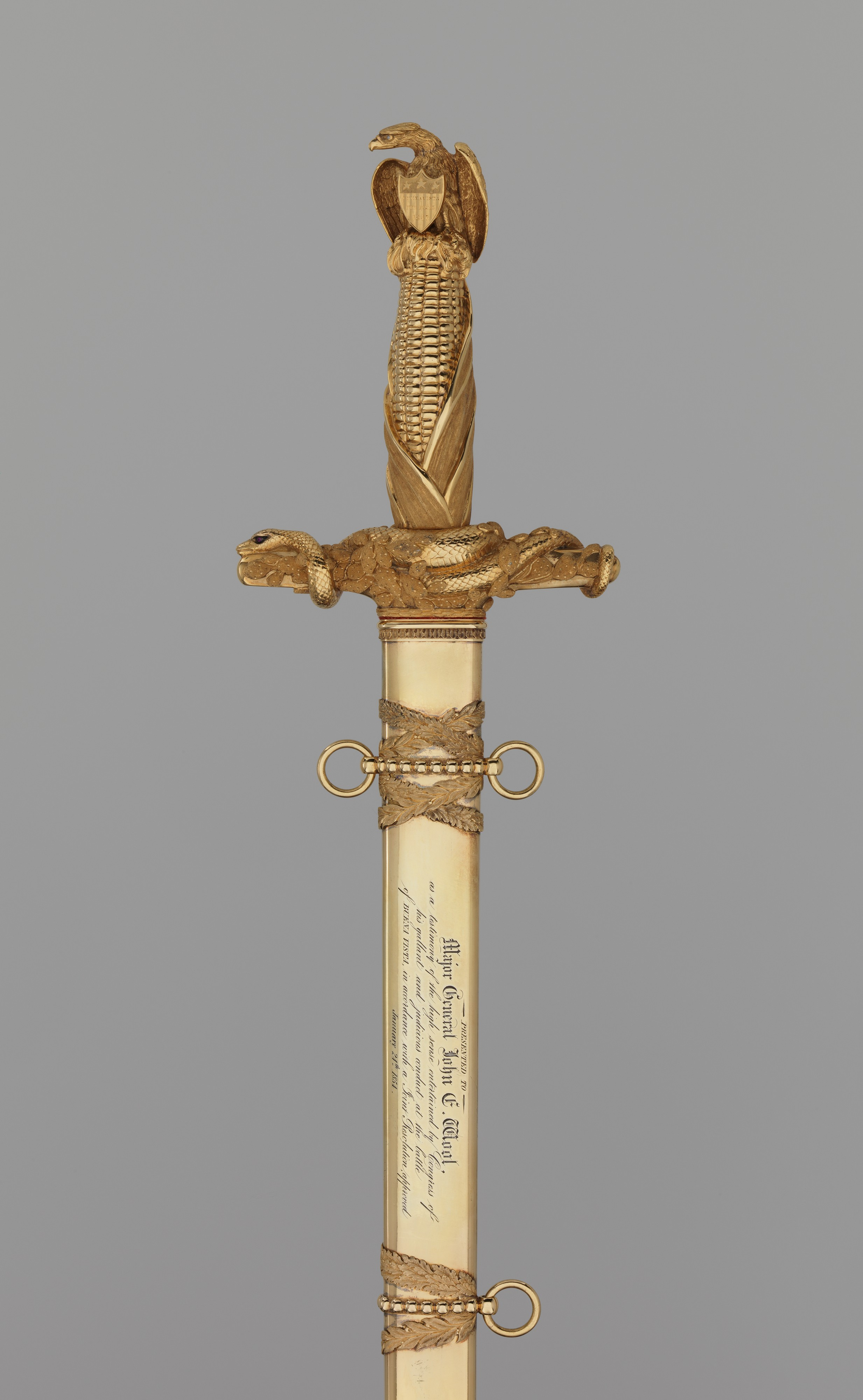
Sword presented to Wool in honor of his victory at the Battle of Buena Vista

Wool was assigned command of the Center Division and led the Chihuahuan Expedition, which resulted in the capture of Saltillo. After leading his troops 900 miles from San Antonio, Texas, he joined General Zachary Taylor at the Battle of Buena Vista. Wool's leadership was recognized with a Congressional sword, a vote of thanks, and the brevet of major general. After the battle, he commanded the occupation forces of northern Mexico.

He commanded both the Department of the East and the Department of the Pacific after the war. The first he would command in 1847–1854 and again in 1857–1860; the second he would command in 1854–1857. While in the East, on August 15, 1848, General Wool laid the cornerstone for the city hospital at Troy, (which later became known as St. Mary's Hospital).

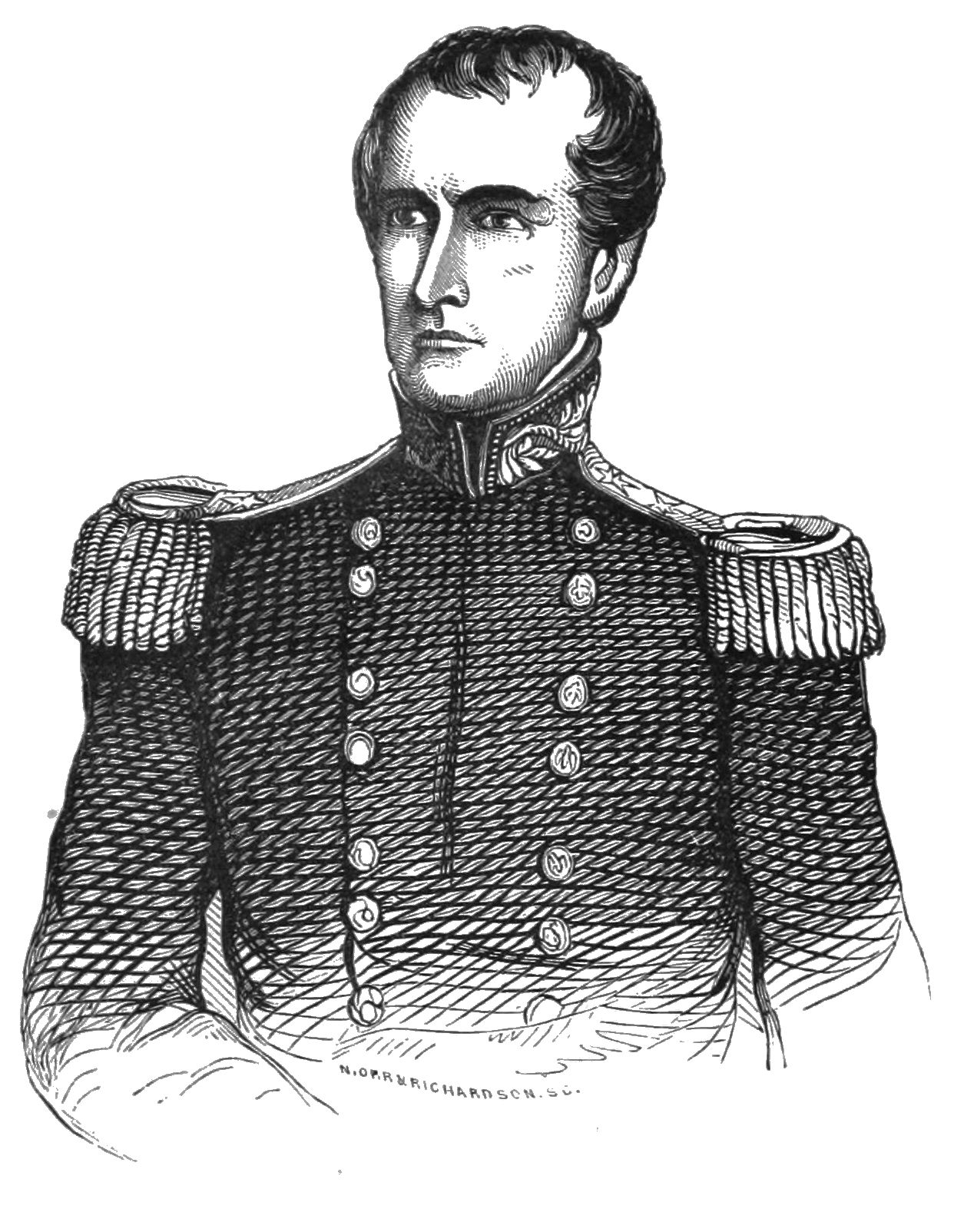
Col. John E. Wool, c. 1825

While in charge of the U.S. Army Department of the Pacific, General Wool contributed extensively to the settling of the Indian Wars in Oregon, especially the Rogue River Indian War. He came into the conflict late, after the Oregon territorial government was formed and the Volunteer Militias had committed many acts of genocide against the tribes in southwestern Oregon Territory (including present-day Washington). Based in California, General Wool wrote to local papers with his opinions of the Oregon situation. Generally he defended the Indian tribes and condemned the acts of the militias. The federal government decided to undertake Indian removal to reservations in order to allow their lands to be taken by the settlers, and Wool was to carry it out. Wool wrote to the Territorial Governor Isaac Stevens about the conflicts:

(From General John E. Wool (Department of the Pacific) to Governor Stevens (Washington Territory), February 12, 1856.)

... the war against the Indians will be prosecuted with all vigor, promptness and efficiency, I am master of, at the same time without wasting, unnecessarily, the means and resources at my disposal, by untimely and unproductive expeditions.

With the additional force which recently arrived at Vancouver and the Dalles, I think I shall be able to bring the war to a close in a few months, provided the extermination of the Indians, which I do not approve of, is not determined on, and private war prevented, and volunteers withdrawn from the Walla Walla country.

Whilst I was in Oregon, it was reported to me, that many citizens, with due proportion of volunteers, and two newspapers, advocated the extermination of the Indians- This principle has been acted on in several instances without discriminating between enemies and friends, which has been the cause, in Southern Oregon, of sacrificing many innocent and worthy citizens, as in the case of Maj. Lupton and his party (volunteers) who killed 25 Indians, eighteen of whom were women and children. These were friendly Indians on their way to their reservation, where they expected protection from the whites. This barbarous act is the cause of the present war in the Rogue River country, and as Capt. Judah, U.S.A. reports, is retaliatory of the conduct of Maj. Lupton.

By the same mail which brought me your communication, I received one, now before me, from a person whom I think incapable of misrepresentation, which informs me that the friendly Cayuses are every day menaced with death by Gov. Curry's volunteers. The writer says that they have despoiled these Indians—who have so nobly followed the advice of Mr. Palmer, to remain faithful friends to the Americans—of their provisions. Today, he says, these same volunteers, without discipline and without orders, are not satisfied with rapine and injustice, and wish to take away the small remnant of animals and provisions left. Every day they run off the horses and cattle of the friendly Indians. They have become indignant, and will not be much longer restrained from resisting conduct unworthy of the whites, who have made them so many promises to respect and protect them if they remain faithful friends. The writer further says, if the volunteers are not arrested in their brigand activities, the Indians will save themselves by flying to the homes of their relatives, the Nez Perces, who have promised them help, and then all Indians of Oregon and Washington will join in the common defense, This information is, in great measure, confirmed by a person who, I am assured enjoys your respect and confidence.

I need not say, although I had previously instructed Col. Wright to take the Walla Walla country at the earliest moment practicable, that I directed him to give protection to the Cayuses from the depredations of the volunteers. It is such conduct as here complained of, that irritated and greatly increases the ranks of the hostile tribes, and if the Nez Perces join in war against us, which I hope to prevent, we shall require a much larger force than we now have in Washington and Oregon Territories to resist savage barbarities and to protect the whites.

== Civil War ==
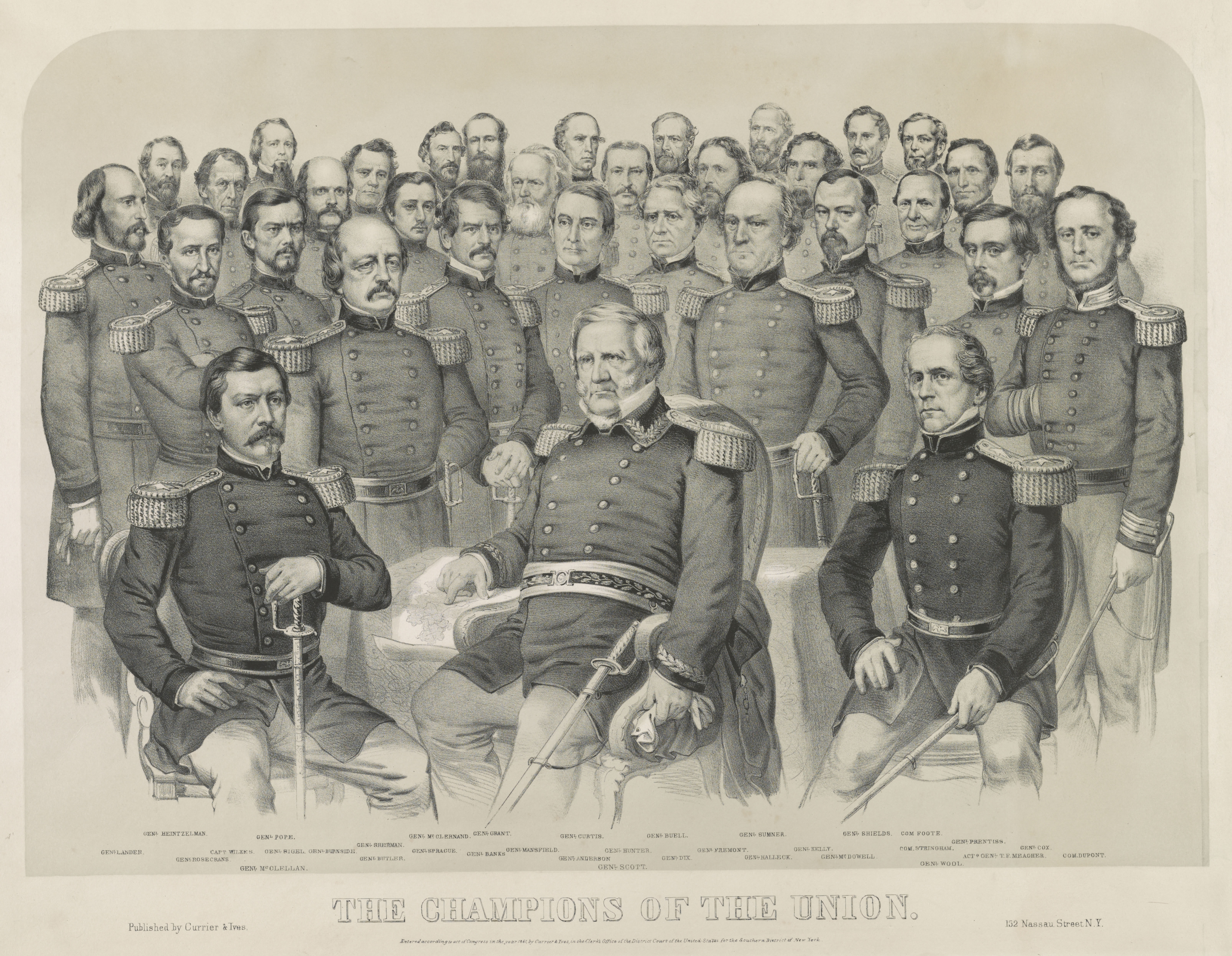
Gen. Wool in The champions of the Union, lithograph by Currier & Ives, 1861

When the Civil War began in April 1861, Wool had just turned 77 years old, two years older than commander-in-chief of the US Army Winfield Scott. Unlike Scott, who suffered from obesity, gout, and other ailments, Wool was still reasonably fit and could mount a horse.

Thus in August 1861, John Ellis Wool was named commander of the U.S. Army Department of Virginia, an office that he would hold until June 1862. He moved to equip some of the first regiments sent from New York to the nation's capital and his quick and decisive moves secured Fort Monroe, Virginia, for the Union when other military installations in the South were falling to Confederate forces. The fort guarded the entrance to the Chesapeake Bay and the James River, overlooking Hampton Roads and the Gosport Navy Yard, which the Confederates had seized. It was to serve as the principal supply depot of Maj. Gen. George B. McClellan's Peninsula Campaign. The septuagenarian Wool thought McClellan was not aggressive enough in his push towards Richmond and in May 1862, he sent troops to occupy the Navy yard, Norfolk, and the surrounding towns after the Confederates abandoned them. The 16th U.S. president, Abraham Lincoln personally witnessed the capture of Norfolk and afterwards rewarded Wool by promoting him to a full major general in the regular army thereby becoming only the 23rd man to hold this rank since its creation in 1791.

Deciding that Wool should have a less demanding assignment at his advanced age, the president transferred him to be the 2nd Commander of the Middle Department in June 1862, which then became the VIII Corps on July 22, 1862. J.E. Wool then served as the 1st Commander of the US Army 8th Corps until December 22, 1862. On January 3, 1863, he again assumed command of the Department of the East where he served until July 18, 1863.

Eventually Wool managed to find his way back into action. After the Battle of Gettysburg, he led troops diverted from that region in military operations to regain control in New York City during and after the draft riots in July of that year. US troops reached the city after rioters had already destroyed numerous buildings, including the Colored Orphan Asylum, which they burned to the ground. Despite the tiny force he had on hand, Wool managed to contain the situation until reinforcements arrived. Thus during July 13–17 of 1863, Wool was de facto Military Commander of New York City.

On August 1, President Lincoln sent an order retiring Wool from service after 51 years in the Army. At the age of 79, he was the oldest general officer to execute active command in either army during the war.

== Retirement and death ==
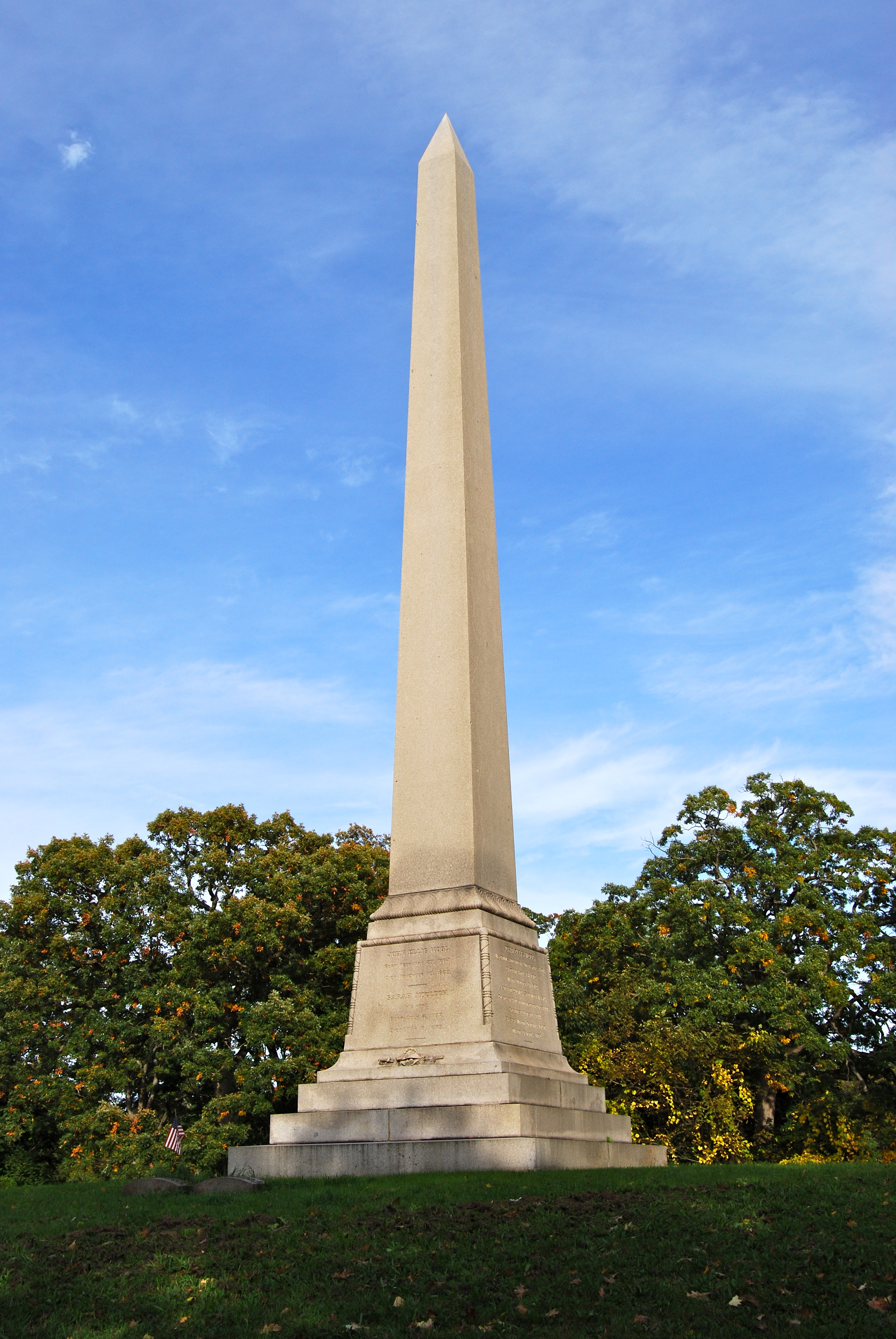
Wool Monument at Oakwood Cemetery

Wool, who believed he was still healthy and fit enough for duty, was stunned and outraged at his dismissal and wrote a series of letters to the War Department in protest, but to no avail. He continued sending letters for the remaining few years of his life to the then President Andrew Johnson and Ulysses Grant, again without effect.

Wool lived in Troy, New York for the remaining five years of his life. He died on November 10, 1869. He was buried there in Oakwood Cemetery. An obelisk was erected as a monument to Wool at the cemetery.

== Dates of rank ==
=== United States Army ===
Date	Insignia	Rank	Brevet promotions
April 14, 1812		Captain	
April 13, 1813		Major	Bvt. Lieutenant colonel (1814) (Note: September 11, 1814, for gallant conduct at the Battle of Plattsburgh.); Bvt. Colonel (1816) (Note: From April 29, 1816, while assigned as Inspector General of the Army (promoted to permanent rank on June 1, 1821).)
February 10, 1818		Lieutenant colonel	
June 1, 1821		Colonel	Bvt. Brigadier general (1826) (Note: April 29, 1826, for ten years of faithful service in one grade.)
June 25, 1841		Brigadier general	Bvt. Major general (1847) (Note: February 23, 1847, for gallantry and meritorious conduct at the Battle of Buena Vista.)
May 16, 1862		Major general	
August 1, 1863	Placed on retired list with the rank of major general (died November 11, 1869).		

== See also ==
- List of American Civil War generals (Union)

== Notes ==
Military offices
Preceded by none	Commander of the VIII Corps; July 12 – December 22, 1862	Succeeded by Robert C. Schenck
