= Henry Vail =

American politician (1782–1853)

Member of the U.S. House of Representatives from New York's 9th district
- In office March 4, 1837 – March 3, 1839
- Preceded by: Hiram P. Hunt
- Succeeded by: Hiram P. Hunt

Personal details
- Born: December 27, 1782 near Millbrook, New York, U.S.
- Died: June 25, 1853 (aged 70) Troy, New York, U.S.
- Resting place: Oakwood Cemetery, Troy, New York, U.S.
- Party: Democratic
- Profession: Politician

Henry Vail (December 27, 1782 – June 25, 1853) was a U.S. Representative from New York.

Born near Millbrook, New York, Vail received a limited schooling. He worked as in the retail business, and from 1815 to 1832 he was a partner in Gardner and Vail, a retailer and wholesaler of dry goods, groceries, and hardware. Vail was active in several other ventures, including serving on the board of directors of the Troy City Bank. He was also active in several horticultural and agricultural societies, and exhibited the fruit from his farm, called Ida Farm (sometimes written Mount Ida Farm), including pears, peaches, apples, gooseberries, currants, plums, and grapes.

Vail was elected as a Democrat to the Twenty-fifth Congress (March 4, 1837 – March 3, 1839).

He was an unsuccessful candidate for reelection in 1838 to the Twenty-sixth Congress.

He resumed his former business pursuits in Troy, New York, and died there June 25, 1853.

He was interred in Oakwood Cemetery.

== Sources ==
- United States Congress. "Henry Vail (id: V000002)". Biographical Directory of the United States Congress.

U.S. House of Representatives
Preceded by Hiram P. Hunt	Member of the U.S. House of Representatives from New York's 9th congressional district 1837–1839	Succeeded by Hiram P. Hunt
