= Job Pierson =

American politician (1791–1860)

Member of the U.S. House of Representatives from New York's 9th district
- In office March 4, 1831 – March 3, 1835
- Preceded by: John Dean Dickinson
- Succeeded by: Hiram P. Hunt

Personal details
- Born: September 23, 1791 East Hampton, New York, U.S.
- Died: April 9, 1860 (aged 68) Troy, New York, U.S.
- Party: Jacksonian
- Spouse: Clarissa Bulkeley Pierson
- Children: Job Pierson (1824-1896); Sarah J. Pierson; John B. Pierson
- Education: Williams College
- Occupation: Lawyer

Job Pierson (September 23, 1791 – April 9, 1860) was an American lawyer and politician who served two terms as a U.S. representative from New York from 1831 to 1835.

== Biography ==
Born in East Hampton, New York, Pierson attended the common schools. He graduated from Williams College in 1811. He studied law in Salem and Schaghticoke. He was admitted to the bar in 1815 and commenced practice in Rensselaer County. He served as district attorney from 1824 to 1833.

=== Congress ===
Pierson was elected as a Jacksonian to the Twenty-second and Twenty-third Congresses (March 4, 1831 – March 3, 1835). After an unsuccessful campaign for reelection to the Twenty-fourth Congress in 1834, he resumed the practice of law. He served as Surrogate of Rensselaer County from 1835 to 1840 and was a delegate to the Democratic National Conventions in 1848, 1852, and 1856.

=== Death ===
Pierson died in Troy, New York and was interred in Oakwood Cemetery.

== Notes and references ==
- United States Congress. "Job Pierson (id: P000343)". Biographical Directory of the United States Congress.

U.S. House of Representatives
Preceded by John Dean Dickinson	Member of the U.S. House of Representatives from New York's 9th congressional district 1831–1835	Succeeded by Hiram P. Hunt
