= James L. Hogeboom =

American politician (1766–1839)

Member of the U.S. House of Representatives from New York's 9th district
- In office March 4, 1823 – March 3, 1825
- Preceded by: Stephen Van Rensselaer
- Succeeded by: William McManus

Member of the New York State Assembly
- In office 1808
- In office 1804–1805

Personal details
- Born: James Lawrence Hogeboom; August 25, 1766 Ghent, Province of New York, British America
- Died: December 23, 1839 (aged 73) Castleton-on-Hudson, New York, U.S.
- Resting place: Castleton Cemetery, Castleton-on-Hudson, New York, U.S.
- Party: Democratic-Republican
- Spouse: Mary Van Alstyne
- Parent(s): Lawrence Hogeboom; Hester Leggett
- Profession: Politician, merchant, lawyer

James Lawrence Hogeboom (August 25, 1766 – December 23, 1839) was an American merchant, lawyer and politician from New York.

== Life ==
Hogeboom was born August 25, 1766 in Ghent, New York, the son of Lawrence Hogeboom (1737–1805, member of the New York State Assembly in 1786 and 1792) and Hester (Leggett) Hogeboom (1739–1832).

Hogeboom removed to Pittstown, New York, in 1794. He married Mary Van Alstyne, and they had several children, among them Dr. James Hogeboom (1800–1870). He removed to Castleton-on-Hudson, New York, in April 1802.

He was a member of the New York State Assembly in 1804-05 and 1808. He was First Judge of the Rensselaer County Court from 1805 to 1808. He was a delegate to the New York State Constitutional Convention of 1821.

Hogeboom was elected as a Crawford Democratic-Republican to the 18th United States Congress, holding office from March 4, 1823 to March 3, 1825. Afterwards he resumed his mercantile business.

Hogeboom died in Castleton-on-Hudson, New York and was buried at Castleton Cemetery.

U.S. House of Representatives
| Preceded by Stephen Van Rensselaer | Member of the U.S. House of Representatives from New York's 9th congressional district 1823–1825 | Succeeded by William McManus |
