= Hiram P. Hunt =

American politician (1796–1865)

Member of the U.S. House of Representatives from New York's 9th district
- In office March 4, 1839 – March 3, 1843
- Preceded by: Henry Vail
- Succeeded by: James G. Clinton

Member of the U.S. House of Representatives from New York's 9th district
- In office March 4, 1835 – March 3, 1837
- Preceded by: Job Pierson
- Succeeded by: Henry Vail

Personal details
- Born: Hiram Paine Hunt; May 23, 1796 Pittstown, New York, U.S.
- Died: August 14, 1865 (aged 69)
- Party: Whig
- Other political affiliations: Anti-Jacksonian
- Education: Union College
- Profession: Politician, lawyer

Hiram Paine Hunt (May 23, 1796 – August 14, 1865) was a U.S. representative from New York.

Born in Pittstown, New York, Hunt attended the public schools and graduated from Union College, Schenectady, New York, in 1816. He studied law at the Litchfield Law School. He was admitted to the bar in May 1819 and commenced practice in Pittstown, New York. He served as town clerk of Pittstown in 1822. He moved to Lansingburgh, New York, in 1825 and to Troy, New York, in 1831, where he continued the practice of law.

Hunt was elected as an Anti-Jacksonian candidate to the Twenty-fourth Congress (March 4, 1835 – March 3, 1837). He was an unsuccessful candidate for reelection in 1836 to the Twenty-fifth Congress.

Hunt was elected as a Whig to the Twenty-sixth and Twenty-seventh Congresses (March 4, 1839 – March 3, 1843). He was not a candidate for renomination in 1842. He resumed the practice of his profession in Troy, New York. He moved to New York City and continued the practice of law until his death on August 14, 1865.

== Sources ==
- United States Congress. "Hiram P. Hunt (id: H000970)". Biographical Directory of the United States Congress.

U.S. House of Representatives
Preceded by Job Pierson	Member of the U.S. House of Representatives from New York's 9th congressional district 1835–1837	Succeeded by Henry Vail
Preceded by Henry Vail	Member of the U.S. House of Representatives from New York's 9th congressional district 1839–1843	Succeeded by James G. Clinton
