= Oakwood Cemetery (Troy, New York) =

Historic rural cemetery

- U.S. National Register of Historic Places
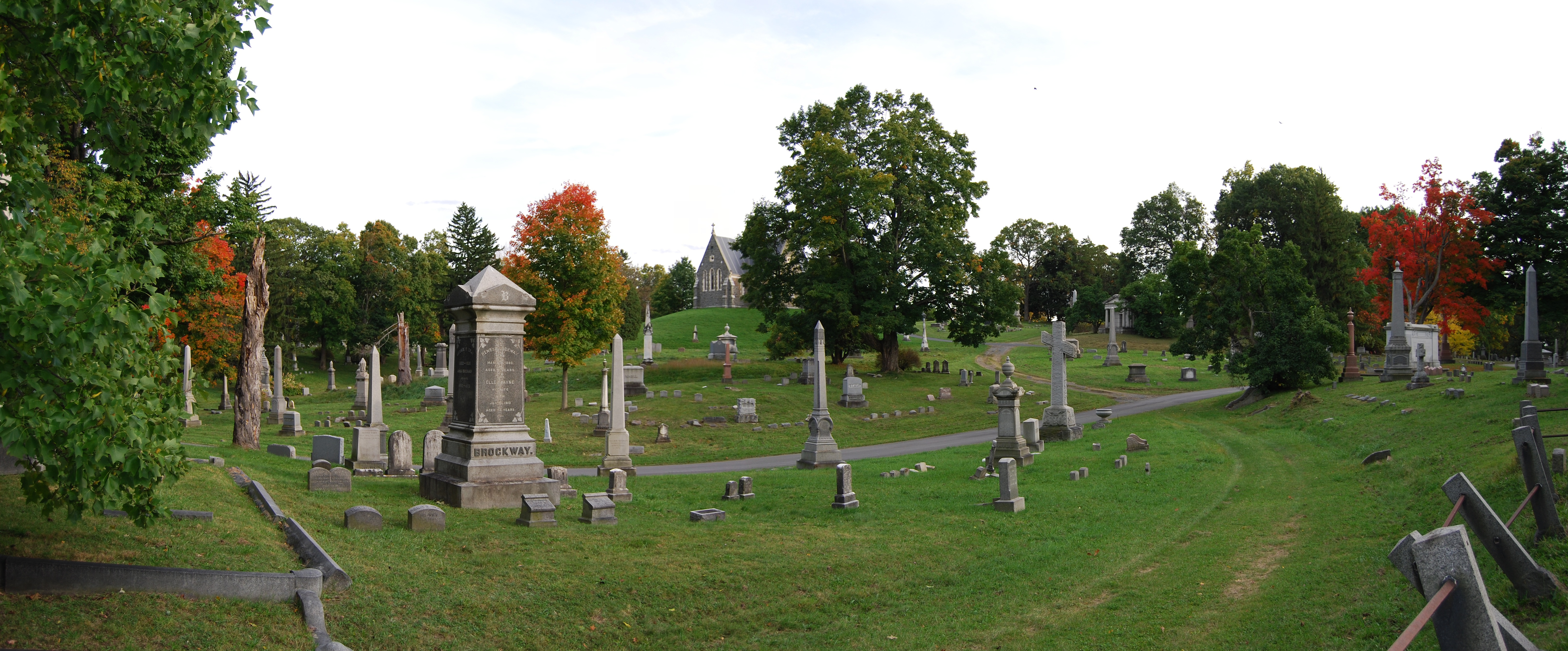
- Section G-4 of Oakwood Cemetery, overlooking Sections G-3 and H-1

- Location within New York Location within the United States
- Interactive map of Oakwood Cemetery
- Location: 50 101st Street, Troy, New York, United States
- Coordinates: 42°45′50″N 73°39′59″W
- Area: Total: 352 acres (142 ha); NRHP Property: 325 acres (132 ha)
- Built: 1848
- Architect: John C. Sidney; John Boetcher
- Architectural style: Greek Revival, Roman Revival, Gothic Revival, Romanesque, Egyptian Revival, Palladian, and other eclectic styles
- NRHP reference No.: 84000021
- Added to NRHP: 1984

Oakwood Cemetery is a nonsectarian rural cemetery in northeastern Troy, New York, United States. It operates under the direction of the Troy Cemetery Association, a non-profit board of directors that deals strictly with the operation of the cemetery. It was established in 1848 in response to the growing rural cemetery movement in New England and went into service in 1850. The cemetery was designed by architect John C. Sidney and underwent its greatest development in the late 19th century under superintendent John Boetcher, who incorporated rare foliage and a clear landscape design strategy. Oakwood was the fourth rural cemetery opened in New York and its governing body was the first rural cemetery association created in the state.

It features four man-made lakes, two residential structures, a chapel, a crematorium, 24 mausolea, and about 60,000 graves, and has about 29 miles (47 km) of roads. It is known both for its dense foliage and rolling lawns, and has historically been used as a public park by Lansingburgh (Note: Lansingburgh is the northern section of Troy, though it progressed separately from Troy. It became a village in 1790 and was annexed as part of the city of Troy in 1900. See the neighborhood map of Troy for a graphical representation.) and Troy residents. Oakwood was added to the National Register of Historic Places in 1984.

Prominent Americans such as Uncle Sam Wilson, Russell Sage, and Emma Willard, at least fourteen members of the United States House of Representatives, and the founders of both Troy and Lansingburgh are buried at Oakwood. The cemetery has been said to be "one of New York State's most distinguished and well-preserved nineteenth-century rural cemeteries." It also offers a panoramic view of the Hudson River Valley that is said to be the "most concentrated and complete overview of American history anywhere in America".

== History ==
The first rural cemetery in the United States—Mount Auburn Cemetery in Cambridge, Massachusetts—was developed in the 1830s. Rural cemeteries are burial grounds typically located on the fringe of a city that offer a natural setting for interment of the dead. The development of rural cemeteries followed closely with the English garden movement of the early 19th century.

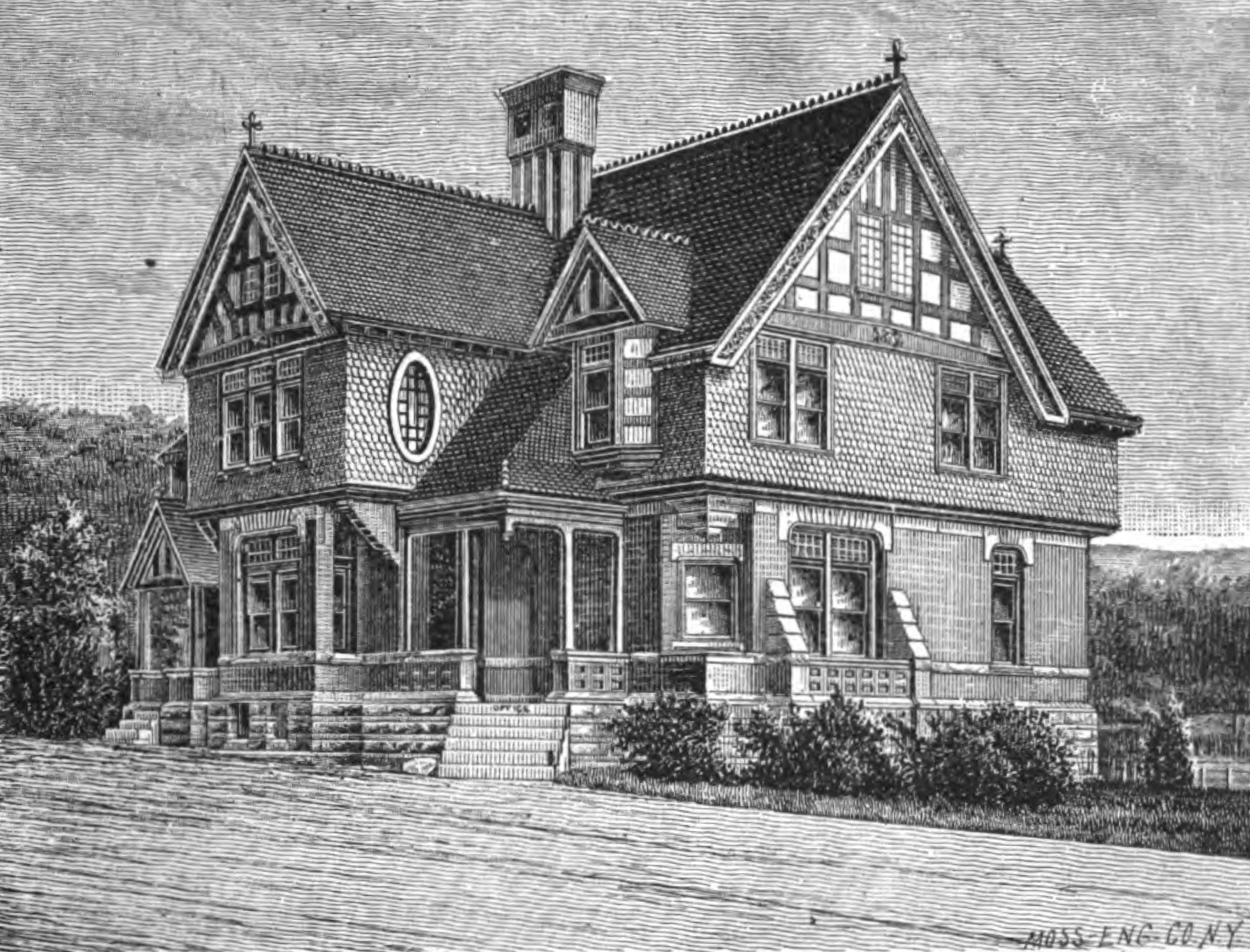
The office lodge in 1886

The Troy Cemetery Association was formed on September 9, 1848; John Paine, D. Thomas Vail, Isaac McConihe, George M. Tibbits, John B. Gale, and Stephen E. Warren were elected its trustees. It was the first rural cemetery association incorporated under an 1847 law authorizing the incorporation of such associations. The trustees appointed a committee to report on an eligible location for a cemetery and on September 5, 1849, the first parcel of land was purchased. On October 16, 1850, the land of the cemetery was consecrated and Oakwood became the fourth rural cemetery founded in New York. The Association is made up of lot owners who are elected by fellow lot owners; the position is voluntary and receives no pay.

Oakwood was designed by John C. Sidney, a Philadelphia engineer familiar with cemetery design, with the help of Garnet Douglass Baltimore, the first African American to earn a degree from the nearby Rensselaer Polytechnic Institute. The plan consisted of roads, man-made lakes, dense vegetation, and rolling hills, covering about 300 acres (120 ha), including the modern sections A through Q. Sidney also designed the original superintendent's house and receiving tomb, neither of which exist today. For all Sidney's extensive planning, the first plots were laid out in a seemingly haphazard manner by the first superintendent, Robert Fergusson.

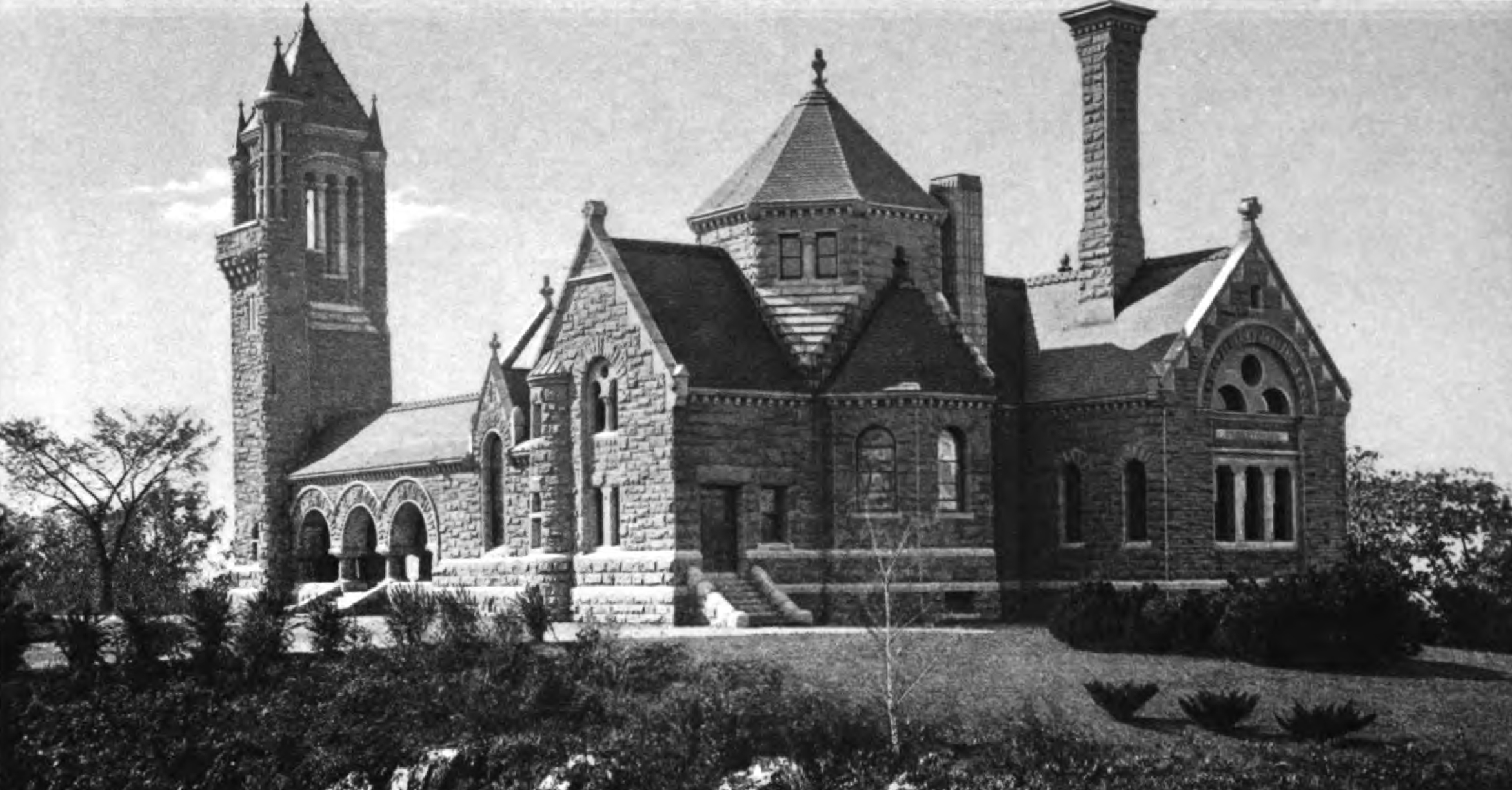
Earl Crematorium c. 1901

Although Sidney was the architect of the cemetery, it was superintendent John Boetcher that gave Oakwood its charm. Boetcher became superintendent in 1871 and continued in the position until 1898. At the beginning of his tenure, Oakwood was said to be quite crude. During Boetcher's tenure Oakwood's most important icons were built: the Earl Chapel and Crematorium, the Warren Chapel Mortuary, the keeper's house, the office lodge, numerous mausolea, and both the 101st Street and 114th Street entrances (including a bridge over the Troy and Boston Railroad on Oakwood's western border to the 101st Street entrance). Boetcher incorporated exceptional landscape design techniques during his tenure; Oakwood developed shifting landscape scenery: some areas are dominated by flowing lawns while others comprise dense foliage. Boetcher brought in rare and foreign plants to help beautify the cemetery, including umbrella pines and Colorado blue spruce.

In 1869, the City of Troy bought the property of the Third Street Burying Ground for the site of a new city hall. This was the burial site for many of Troy's earliest inhabitants; the city had bought lot number 102 in Section N for re-interment of 146 graves. The Vanderheyden family and Jacob Lansing, founders of Troy and Lansingburgh respectively, were re-interred in Oakwood from private, family cemeteries. With these re-interments, the graves within Oakwood span the entire the history of Troy.

Although it was a cemetery by definition, Oakwood quickly became a place for recreation and was used in its early days as a public park. In response to its popularity, many memorials include benches in their design, aimed to invite visitors to rest while enjoying their visit. So popular was Oakwood that in 1908 the Association began a stage service between the Oakwood Avenue and 114th Street entrances.

A 325-acre (132 ha) section of Oakwood was nominated for the National Register of Historic Places in August 1984 and was added to the Register on October 10, 1984. The cemetery originally owned about 110 acres (45 ha) on the east side of Oakwood Avenue, but sold the land in two transactions in the 2000s (decade). The land deals were made to increase the Association's operating income. As of 2009, the cemetery contained roughly 60,000 graves and its numbers continue to grow. The Association expects to be able to accept interments until at least the early 23rd century.

== Geography ==
Section plan of Oakwood Cemetery: Earl Crematorium Warren Chapel The Panorama

Oakwood is built on an escarpment that rises east of the fluvial plain surrounding the Hudson River, opposite the confluence of the Hudson and Mohawk. It is in eastern Lansingburgh, within the northeast section of the city of Troy. (Note: A very small portion of the easternmost section of the cemetery (on the west side of Oakwood Avenue) resides within the town of Brunswick.) Its western edge is dominated by a steep, densely vegetated hill that descends to the city below while the central and eastern portions of the cemetery comprise rolling hills graced with trees and vegetation that include four man-made ponds created by damming local streams. The property is generally long and thin, running approximately north–south along Oakwood Avenue (New York Route 40).

The cemetery covers 352 acres (142 ha) of which 325 acres (132 ha) contribute to the listing on the National Register of Historic Places. In the east–west direction, the cemetery extends from Gurley Avenue and the bed of the old Troy and Boston Railroad (Note: In 1972 the railroad tracks were dismantled and in 1981 the bed was transformed into a scenic bicycle path called the Uncle Sam Bikeway.) on the west, to Oakwood Avenue on the east. The northern boundary is Farrell Road Extension and the southern boundary is a line that extends due east from a point just south of 101st Street, to Oakwood Avenue.

The cemetery is split into sections for ease of finding graves which, for the most part, follow an alphabetic (e.g., Section K) or alphanumeric (e.g., Section D-3) naming system, though there are some that follow a numeric scheme. The sections are split by paved and gravel roads and pedestrian paths that total 29 miles (47 km).

There are three operating entrances to the cemetery. The main entrance is on Oakwood Avenue at the southern tip of the property; (Note: 42°45′11″N 73°40′14″W) it is flanked by the keeper's house. The 114th Street entrance (Note: 42°46′24″N 73°40′04″W) is marked only by a gate and connects to Gurley Avenue. The 101st Street entrance (Note: 42°45′13″N 73°40′43″W) passes the office lodge.

== Landmarks ==
The large amount of space in rural cemeteries permits the use of sculpture in a way that the crowded churchyard never really allowed. Many rural cemeteries, including Oakwood, subsequently became virtual outdoor sculpture museums, displaying the works of well-known contemporary sculptors as memorials to the deceased. Oakwood is home to thousands of individual statues and sculptures as well as 24 private mausolea. Because of its popularity as a public park, many memorials included benches to invite visitors to rest while visiting the large, hilly property.

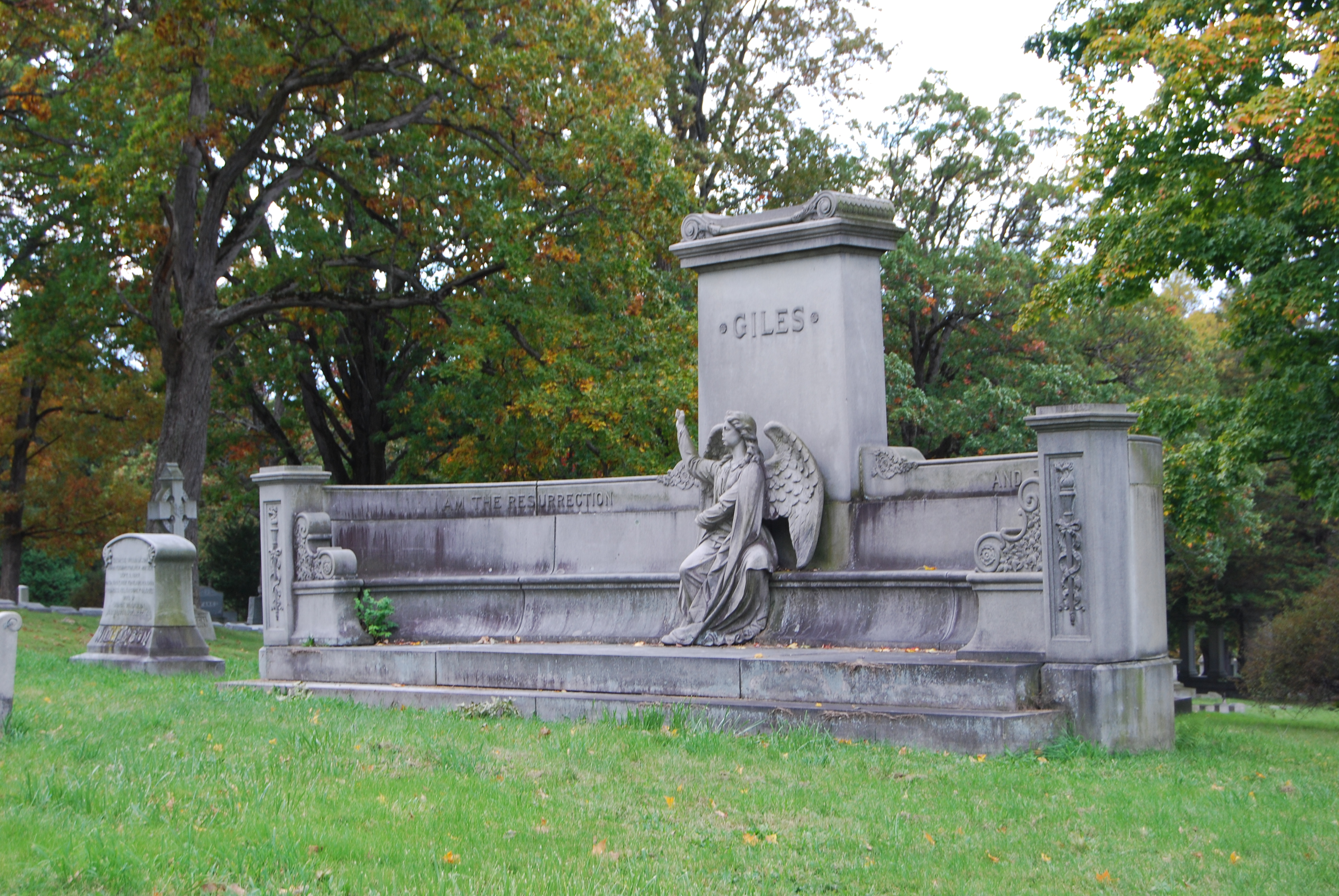
The Giles Memorial, like many at Oakwood, incorporates seating for visitors.

Many historically important sculptors are represented on the grounds of Oakwood. Robert E. Launitz, creator of the memorial urn for A. J. Downing on the National Mall in Washington, D. C., sculpted the memorial for Major General George H. Thomas, which incorporates a white marble sarcophagus topped with a bald eagle. William Henry Rinehart's final work, a life-size sculpture of Julia Taylor Paine, resides in Oakwood. J. Massey Rhind, known for his statue of Crawford W. Long in the National Statuary Hall Collection, is the artist behind the Robert Ross Monument. The Ross Monument shows Ross defending a ballot box, honoring his martyrdom, which resulted from his active work against election corruption in Troy. Joseph Fuller's grave is marked by an elaborately carved Celtic Cross—one of the first in the cemetery—and is based on another monument that Fuller saw while visiting Ireland.

One of the most significant monuments is that to Major General John E. Wool. The 75.5-foot (23.0 m) monolithic obelisk which was a technological marvel in its day is constructed from granite quarried and shaped by the Bodwell Granite Company of Vinalhaven, Maine, and at 650 tons was believed to be the largest shaft quarried in the United States up to that time. It was transported to Troy by boat and brought to the cemetery on rollers. This and the many other obelisks in the cemetery exhibit the sentiment and taste of the Victorian and Edwardian eras.

In 1862 the Troy Cemetery Association set aside an area in Section P, called the Soldiers' Plot, for deceased Army and Navy officers and soldiers from Rensselaer County.

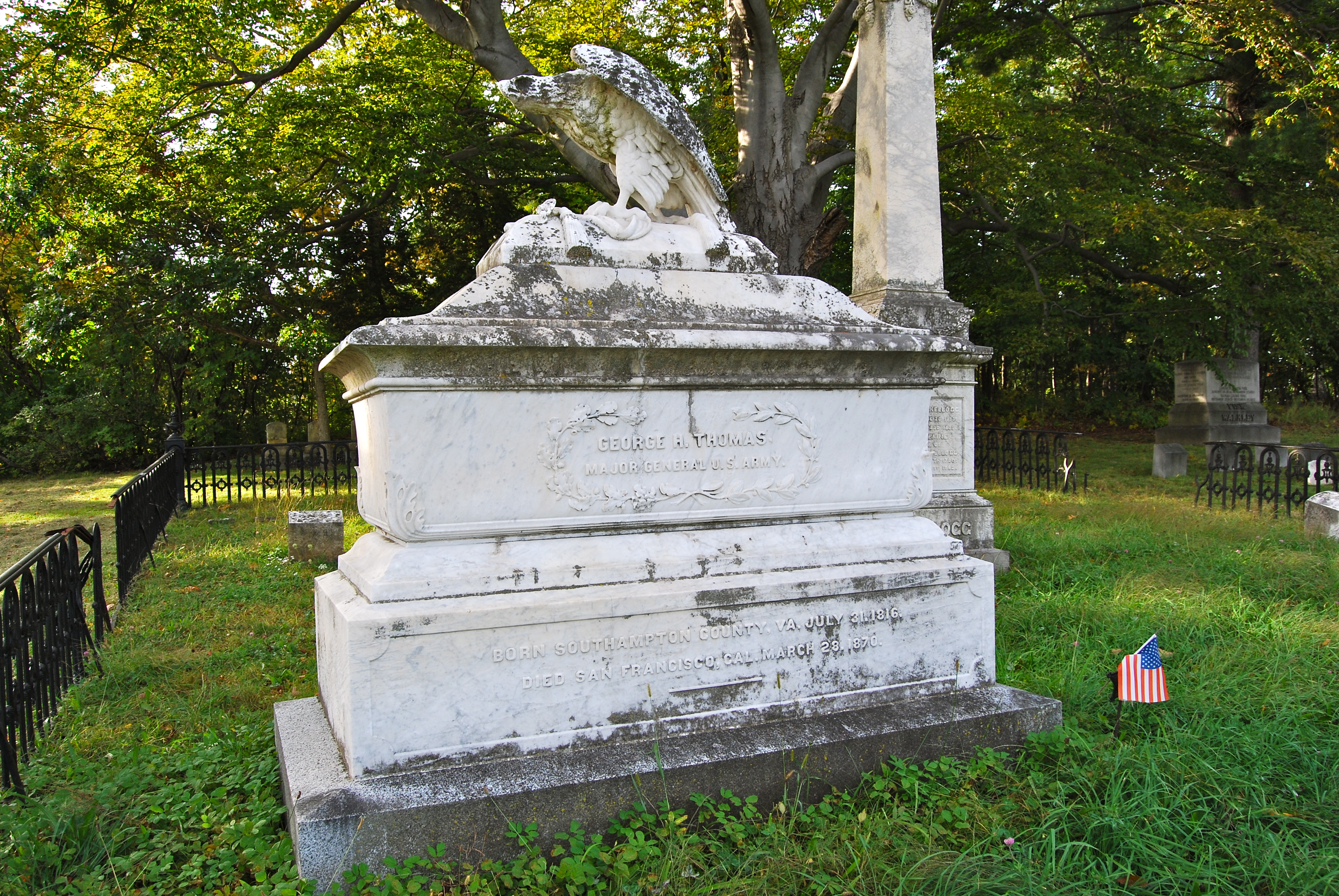
Major General Thomas Memorial, by Launitz

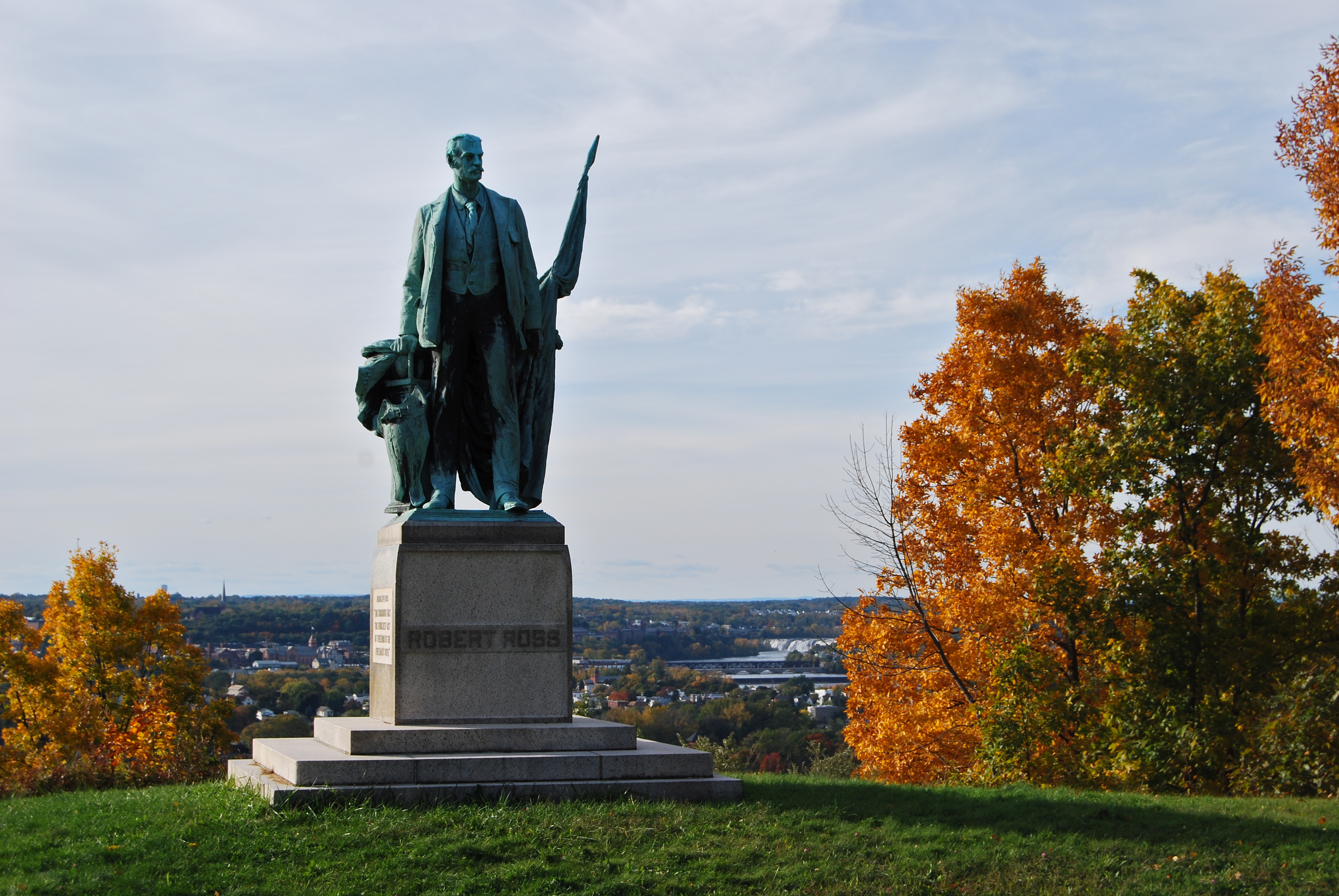
Robert Ross Memorial, by Rhind

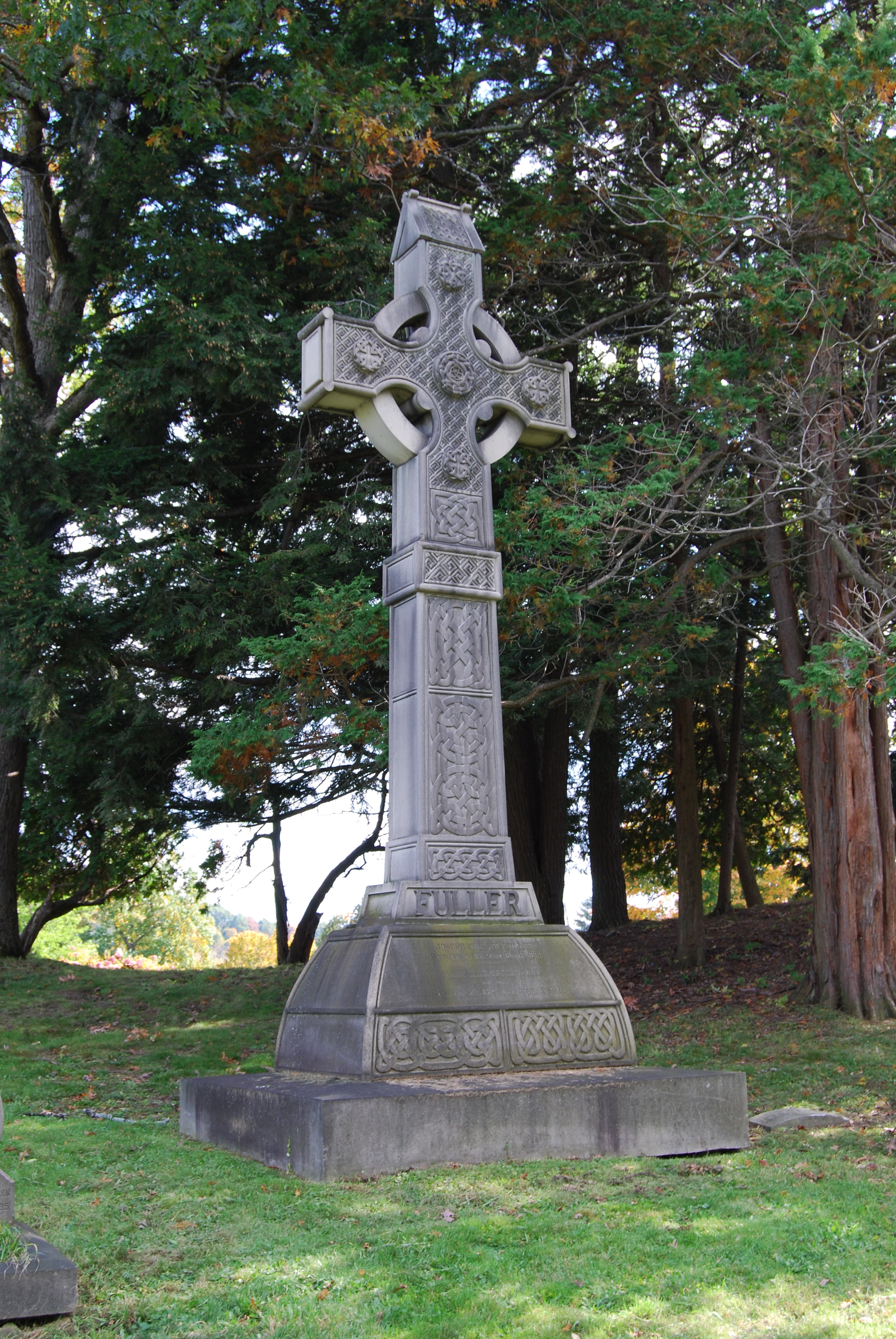
Fuller Monument, a Celtic Cross

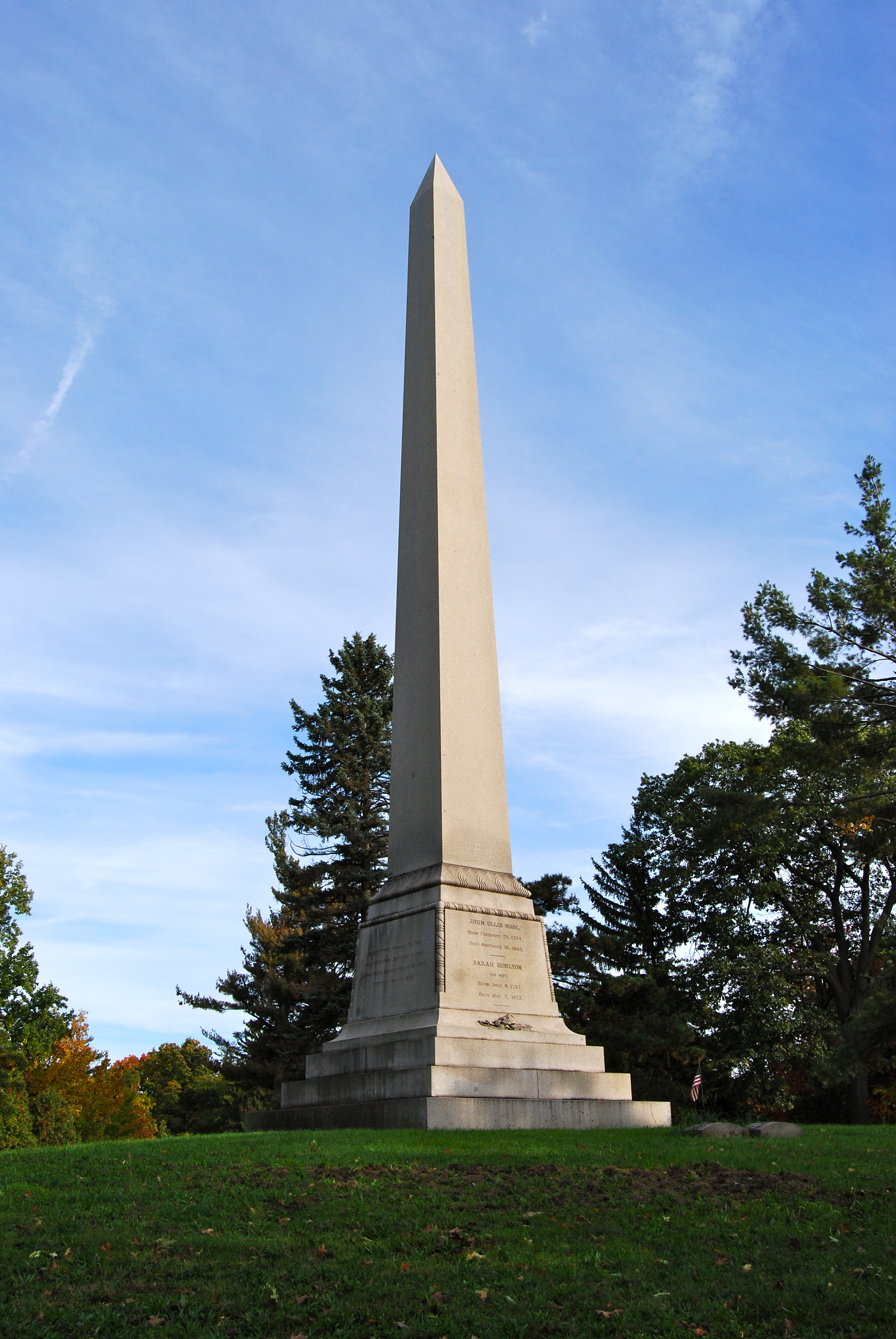
Major General Wool Monument

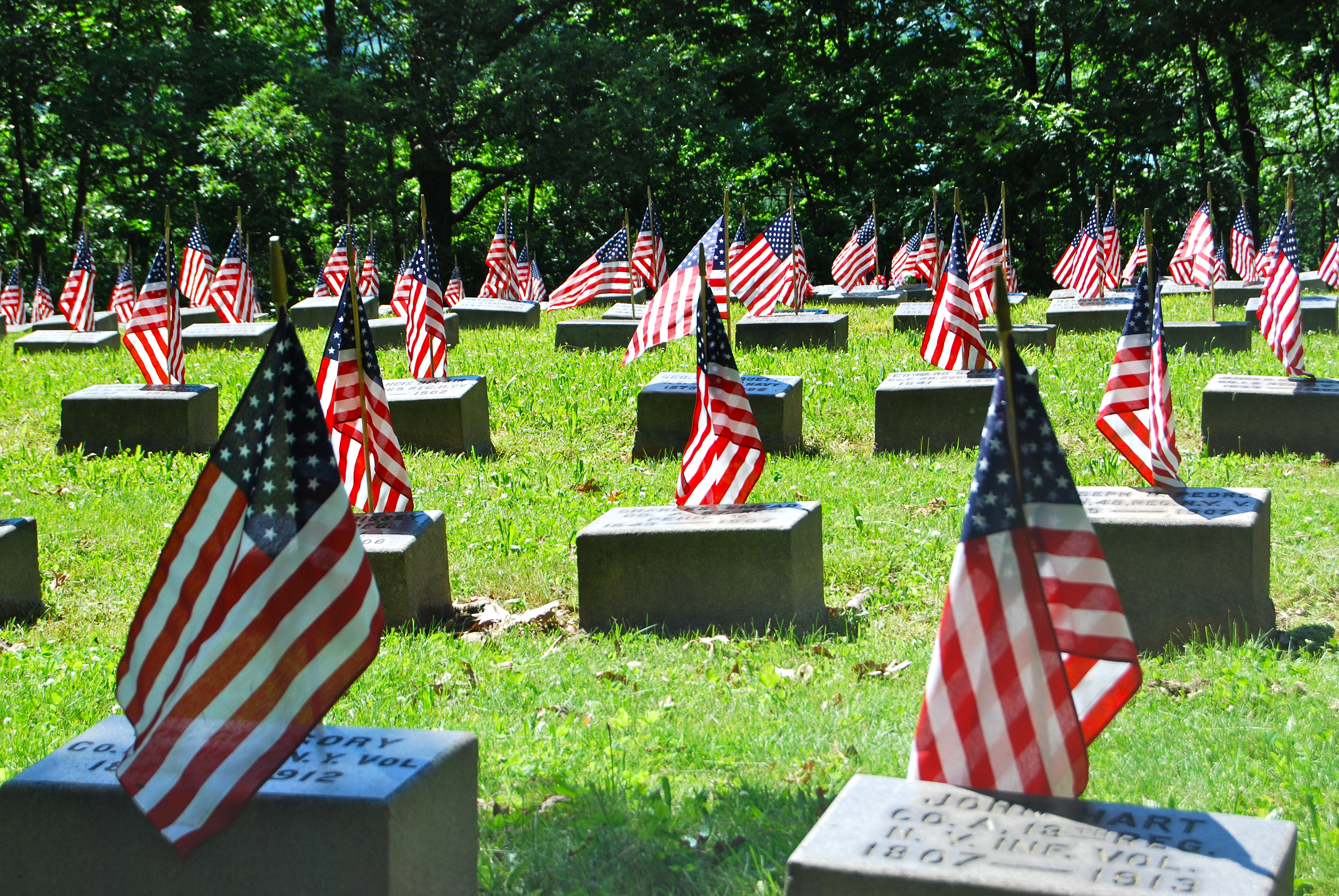
Soldiers' Plot

=== Gardner Earl Memorial Chapel and Crematorium ===
- Gardner Earl Memorial Chapel and Crematorium
- U.S. National Register of Historic Places
- U.S. National Historic Landmark
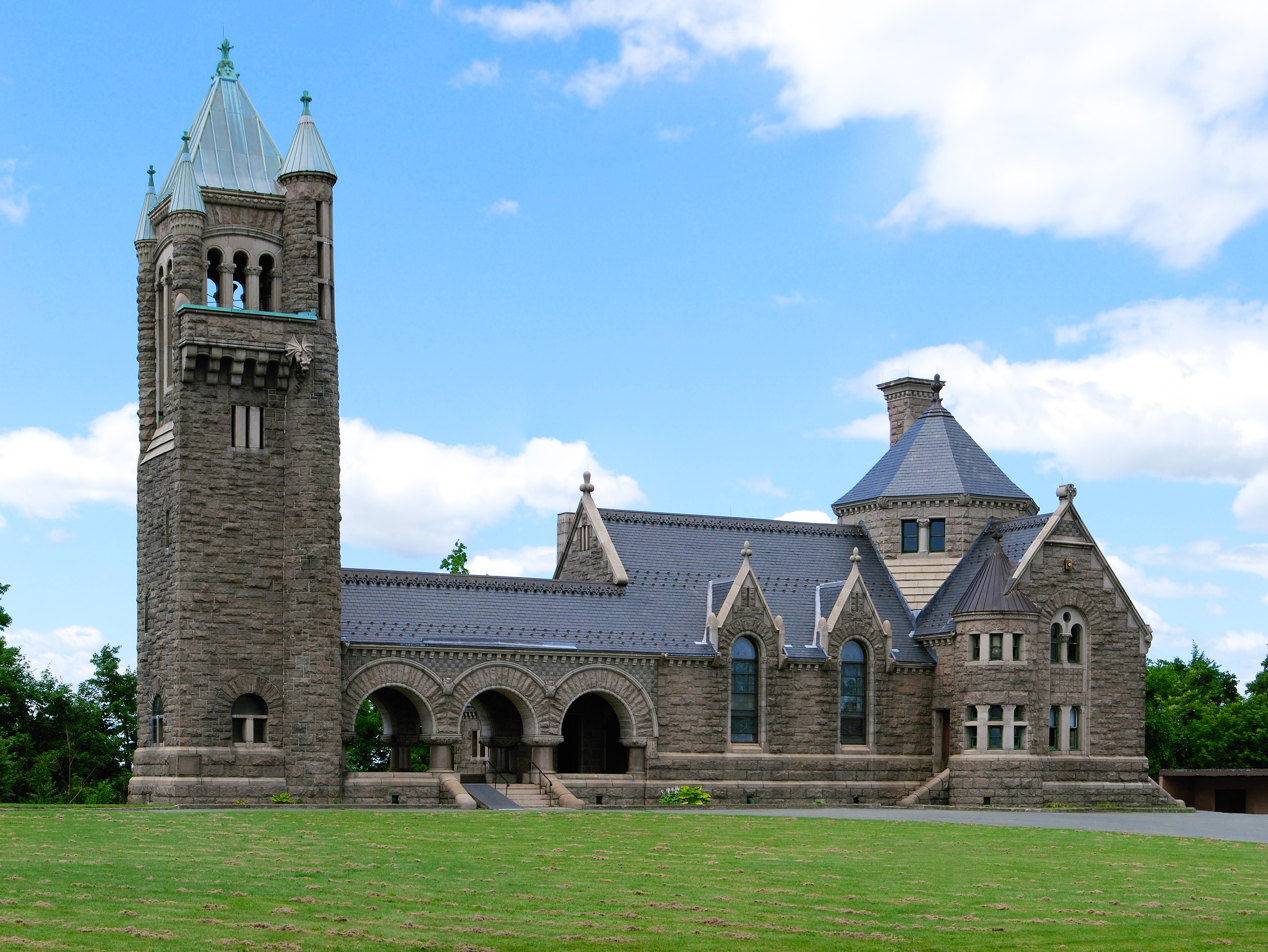
- Gardner Earl Memorial Chapel and Crematorium; Dark stone-faced building with tall bell tower at left. Arches connect to the main receiving rooms and chapel; roof is a slate blue color

- Location within New York Location within the United States
- Location: 50 101st St., Troy, New York
- Area: less than one acre
- Built: 1888
- Architect: Fuller & Wheeler; Tiffany Glass and Decorating, et al
- Architectural style: Romanesque
- NRHP reference No.: 04000091

Significant dates
- Added to NRHP: February 25, 2004
- Designated NHL: March 2, 2012

The most significant building on the property is the Gardner Earl Memorial Chapel and Crematorium, a Richardsonian Romanesque structure built between 1887 and 1889, which sits near the edge of the escarpment about 300 feet (91 m) above the Hudson. The building was financed by William S. Earl, a successful Troy manufacturer, as a memorial to his son who became ill and died on a trip to Europe in March 1887. The deceased son was an early promoter of cremation and was himself cremated in Buffalo.

The building consists of a 90-foot (27 m) bell tower with an 18-foot (5.5 m) square base on the south side, connected by a triple-arched loggia to a chapel and crematorium on the north side. The floor plan of the entire building measures 136 by 70 feet (41 by 21 m). The exterior is covered by a pink-tinted Westerly granite and the foundation sits completely on bedrock.

The interior is noted for its sumptuous and intricate design. The original furnace room was transformed into an elaborately designed reception room in 1889, the furnaces having been moved into a separate room. This features significant use of marble, from Siena, Japan, and Africa, on its walls, floors, and molding. The Troy Daily Times stated on November 7, 1889, that, "the chapel is a model of architectural and mechanical skill," and that the chapel's reception room "is certainly the equal, and possibly in respect to artistic detail and elaborateness of execution, the superior of any church interior in the land."

The interior of the chapel is marked by quartered oak ceilings, bluestone floors, and five original Tiffany stained glass windows. The chancel contains an onyx altar and mosaic floor made of more than twenty colors of marble.

The Earl Crematorium was listed in its own right on the National Register of Historic Places in 2003 and was designated a National Historic Landmark on March 5, 2012.

=== Warren Family Mortuary Chapel ===
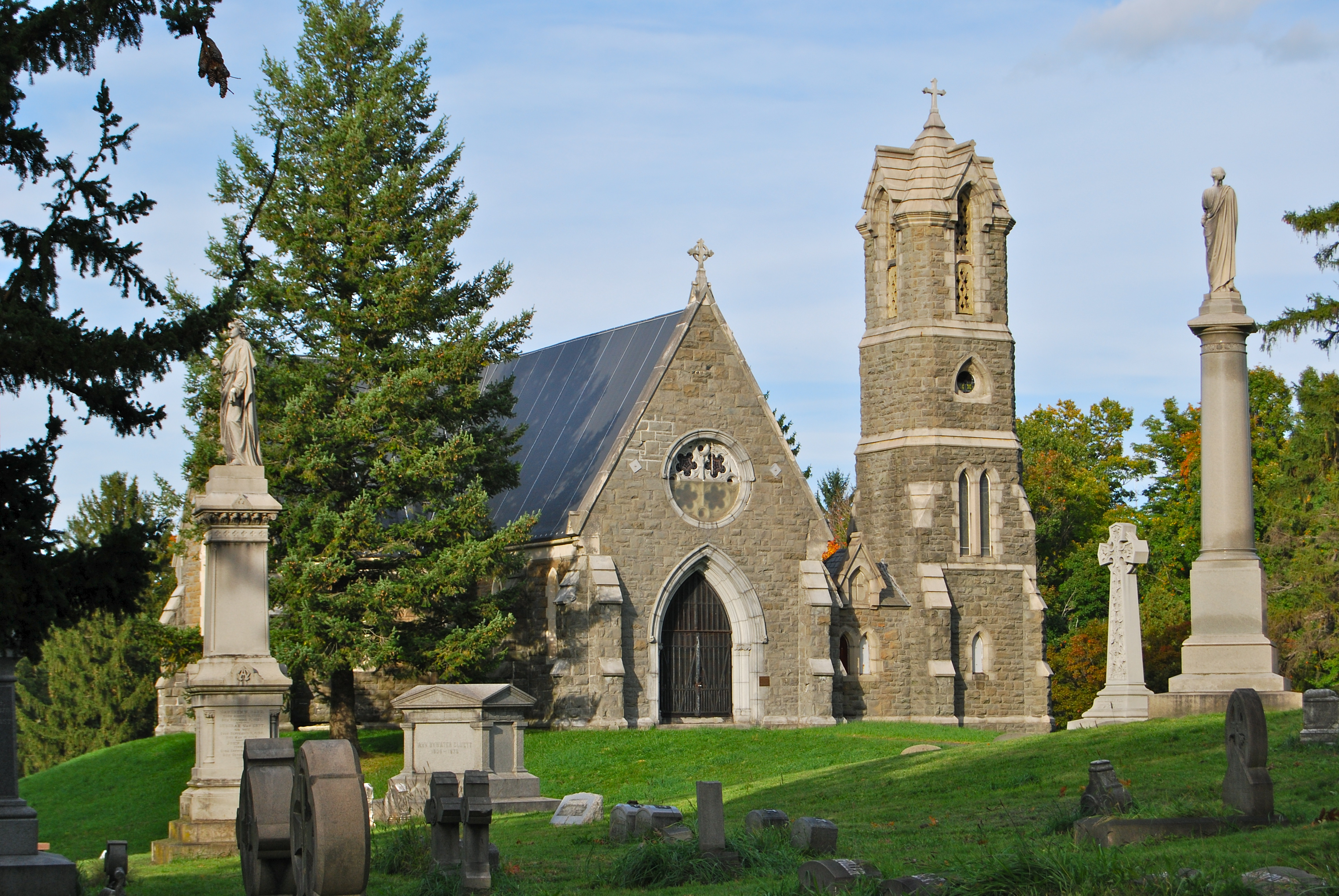
Warren Family Mortuary Chapel

The Warren Family Mortuary Chapel is a stone chapel built on a knoll near the center of the cemetery. It was designed by Henry Dudley of New York City and built in 1860 in the English country Gothic style, complete with a nave and transept floor plan. A tower was added in 1883, with great care placed on finding building material that matched the earlier structure. The Chapel contains stained glass windows above the altar designed by artist Robert Walter Weir. Former member of the United States House of Representatives Joseph Mabbett Warren (1813–1896) is interred in the chapel.

=== Vanderheyden Bell ===
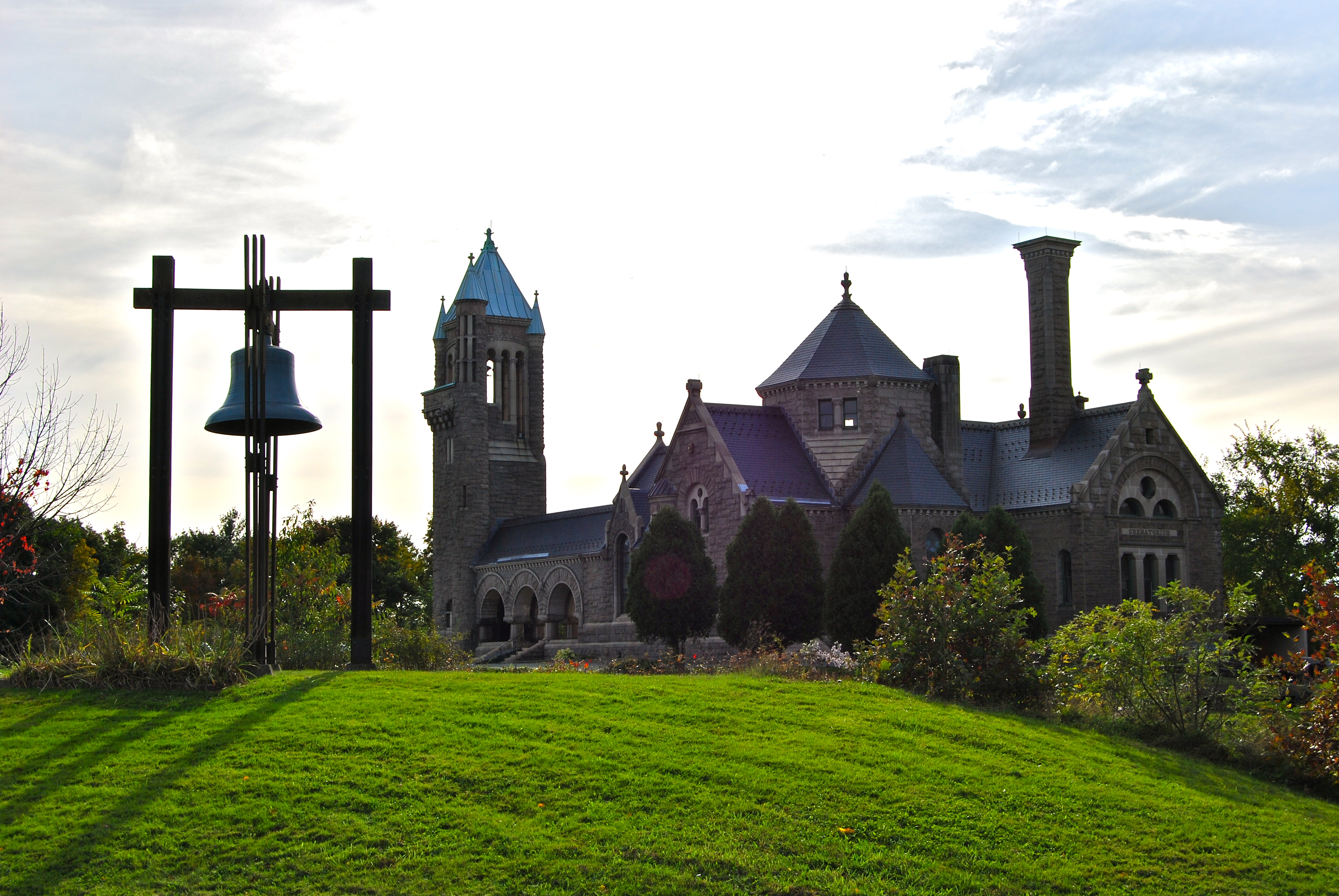
The Vanderheyden Bell seen in front of the Earl Crematorium

The Vanderheyden Bell, a memorial itself, is located northeast of the Earl Crematorium. It is a bronze, cast bell weighing more than 3,000 pounds (1,400 kg). Its original home was under a log shelter on the premises. At some point, it was placed into storage. In 1971 it was resurrected and hung among four redwood posts, becoming an additional "tower" on the property.

=== Mausolea ===
Oakwood is home to 24 mausolea and burial vaults exhibiting a wide range of architectural styles including Greek Revival, Egyptian Revival, Roman Revival, Gothic Revival, Romanesque, and Palladian. These structures are scattered throughout the grounds, some clustered, some not. They house the remains of some of Troy's wealthier and more notable historical figures.

The Cannon Mausoleum is mainly Greek Revival to look at, but also has Romanesque aspects, such as a cruciform floor plan and a domed roof. The Strope Mausoleum is a simplified Greek Revival structure, with a bronze door in the Art Nouveau style displaying an angel surrounded by lilies. The Tracy Mausoleum, incorporating the most eclectic mix of design influences on the property, has a rock-faced stone exterior covered with foliate carvings. It displays a combination of Romanesque, Moorish, and Baroque elements, and is topped with a "beehive" roof—one of its more recognizable design features. The Tibbits Mausoleum, Vail Vault, and Gale Mausoluem are all done in the Gothic Revival style. The Kemp Mausoleum is the Palladian representative on site and the Paine Mausoleum is another eclectic design, octagonal in shape, and flanked by benches.

The Sage Mausoleum, built of Westerly granite, exhibits obvious Greek influences and is intentionally not marked. Russell Sage, the wealthy financier and member of the United States House of Representatives from Troy, is interred alone; his second wife Margaret decided to be buried with her parents in Syracuse. To the left of the memorial is a bench that contains a relief of Medusa on the center of the back, complete with snakes as hair.

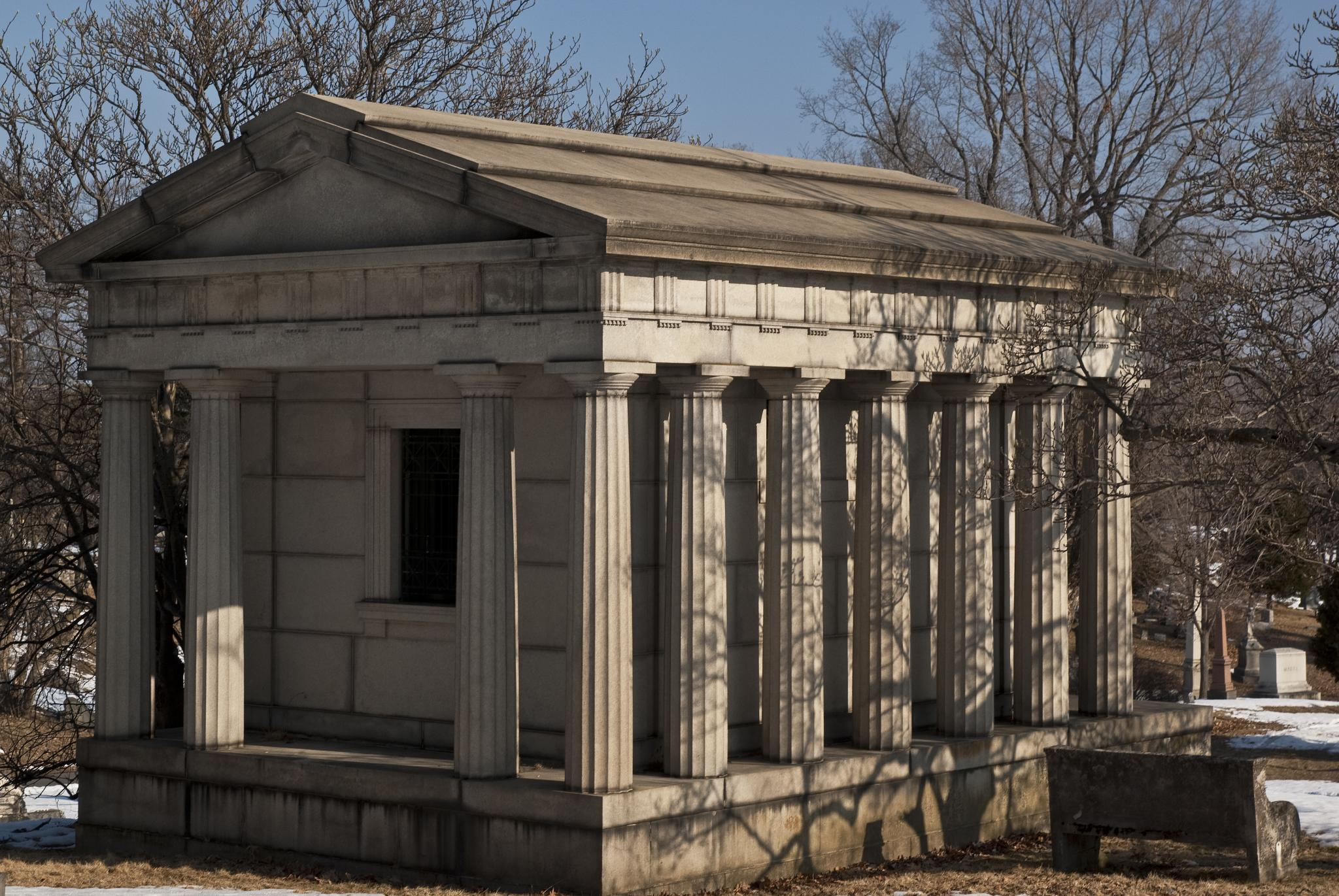
Russell Sage is interred alone in this unmarked mausoleum.

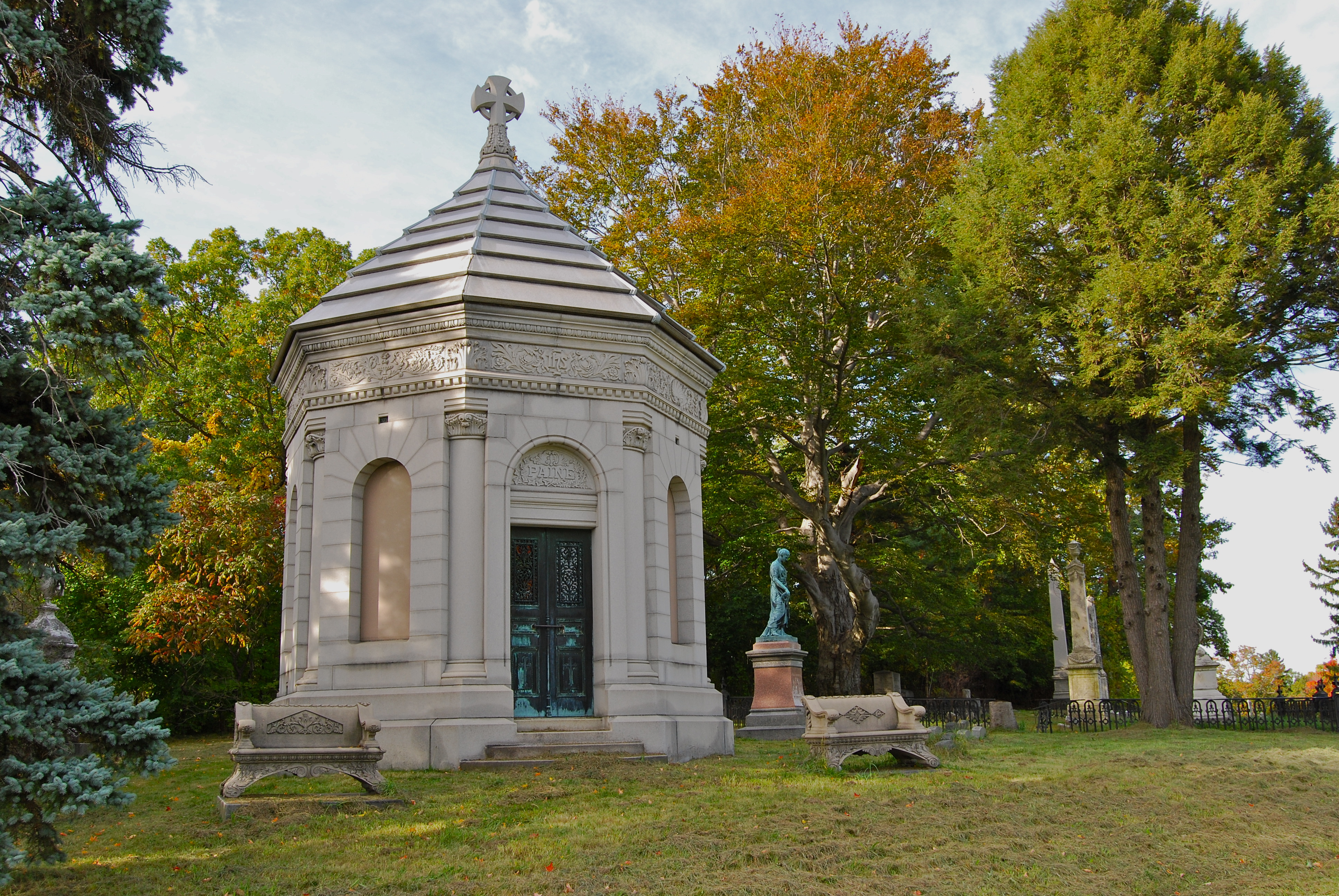
The Paine Mausoleum is octagonal and features benches for visitors to rest.

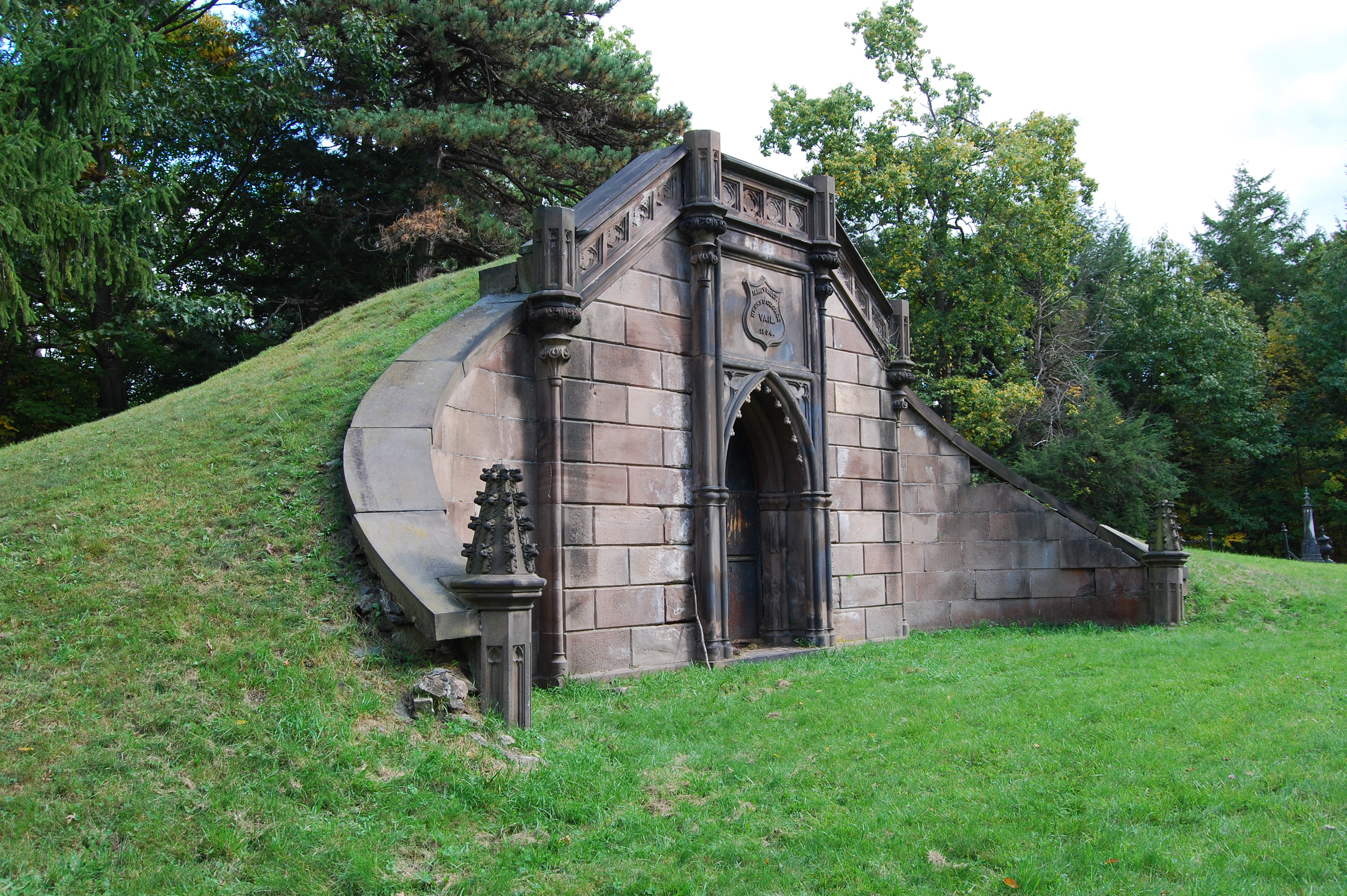
The Vail Vault is a mausoleum built into a raised hillside.

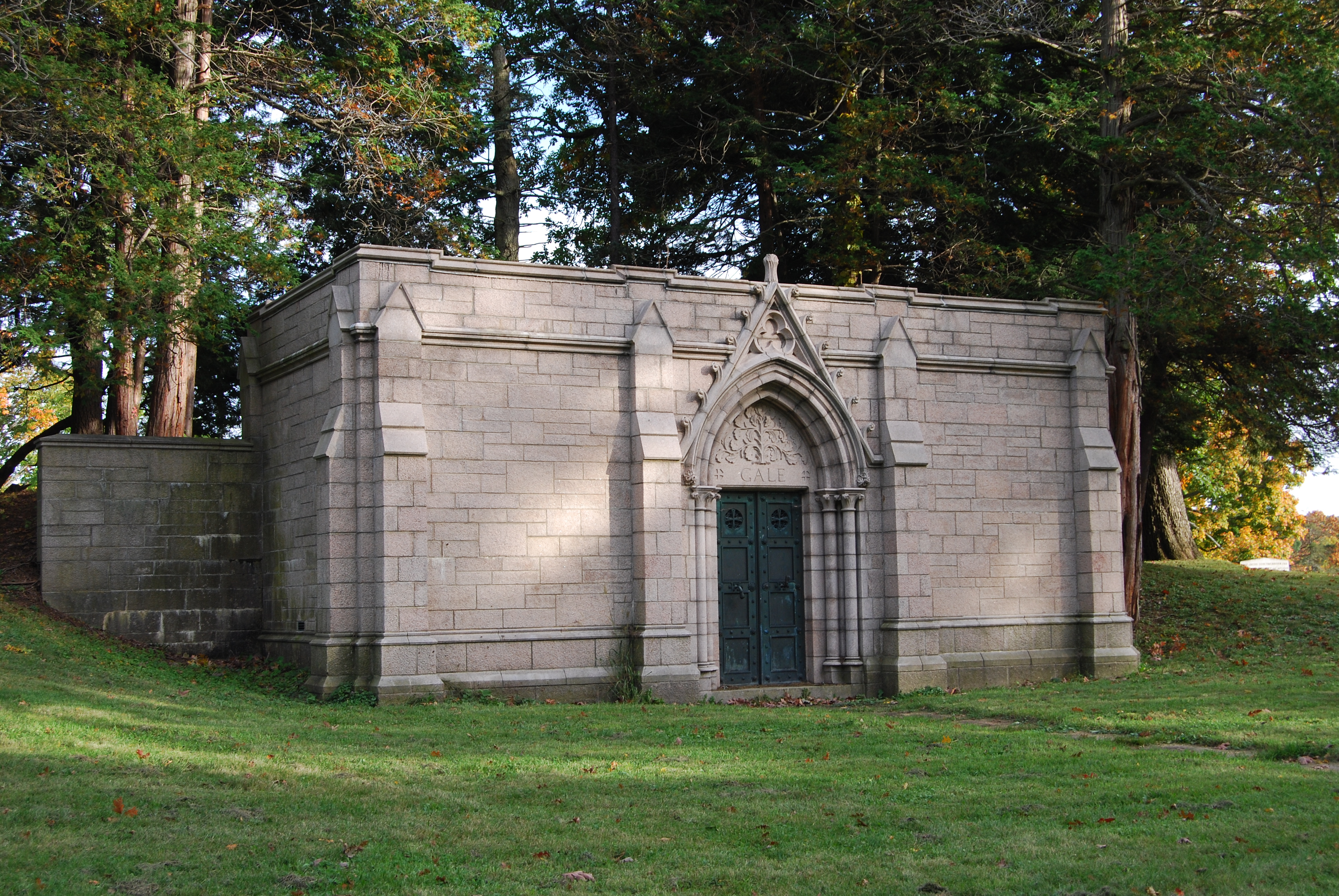
The Gale Mausoleum incorporates many Gothic Revival elements.

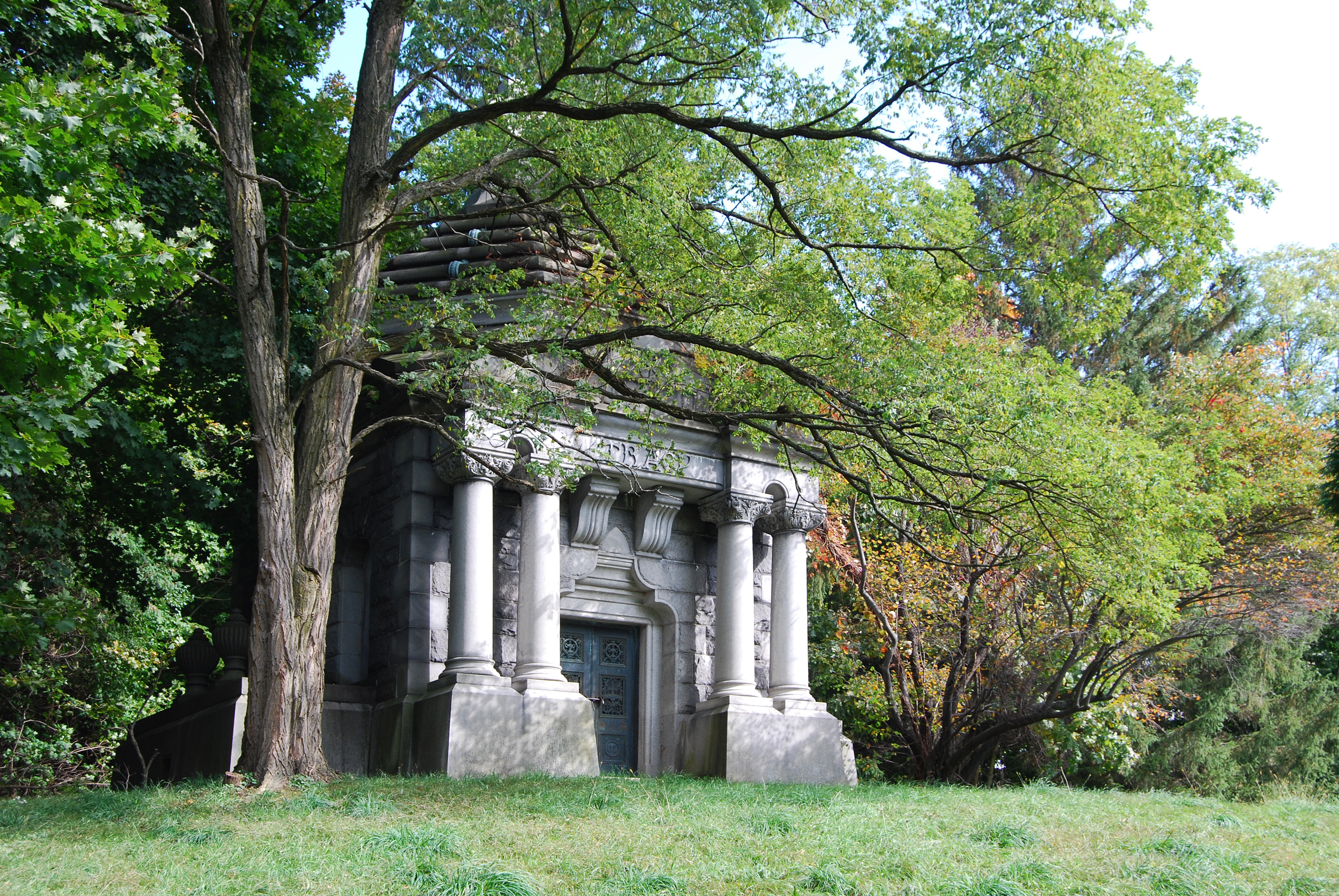
The Tracy Mausoleum's eclectic design includes a "beehive" roof.

=== The Panorama ===
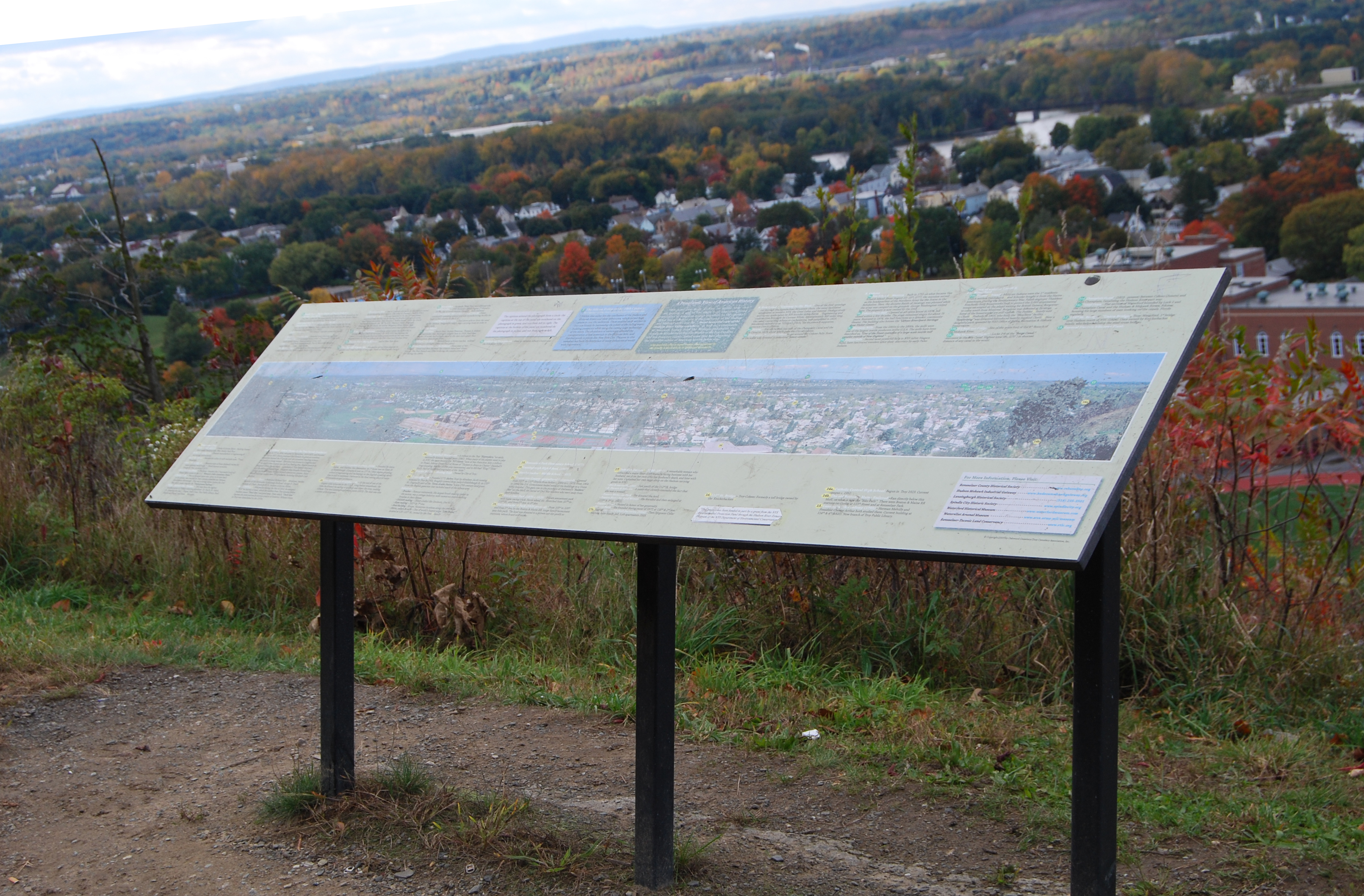

The Panorama is an 84-inch (210 cm) panoramic photograph created by local photographer Tom Wall and set in acrylic on a steel stand in the cemetery's northwestern section. It sits at the edge of a bluff directly overlooking the grounds of Lansingburgh High School and Knickerbacker Middle School. The photograph spans a 100-mile (160 km) view and contains labels and notes—referred to by the Troy Cemetery Association as "cliff notes"—about the history of objects shown in the photograph. From this point, one can view Albany and the Empire State Plaza (most notably the Corning Tower and Alfred E. Smith Building), the Helderberg Escarpment, South Troy, downtown Troy, Lansingburgh, Watervliet, Green Island, Cohoes, the Cohoes Falls, Waterford, the Hudson River, the confluence of the Mohawk and Hudson Rivers, and the eastern terminus of the Erie Canal. The Troy Cemetery Association claims that the view offers the "most concentrated and complete overview of American history anywhere in America". It shows evidence of Paleolithic rocks, Native Americans, the Dutch, the British, the French and Indian Wars, the American Revolution, the Industrial Revolution, and the "Way West" movement resulting in the creation of the Erie Canal and Champlain Canal.

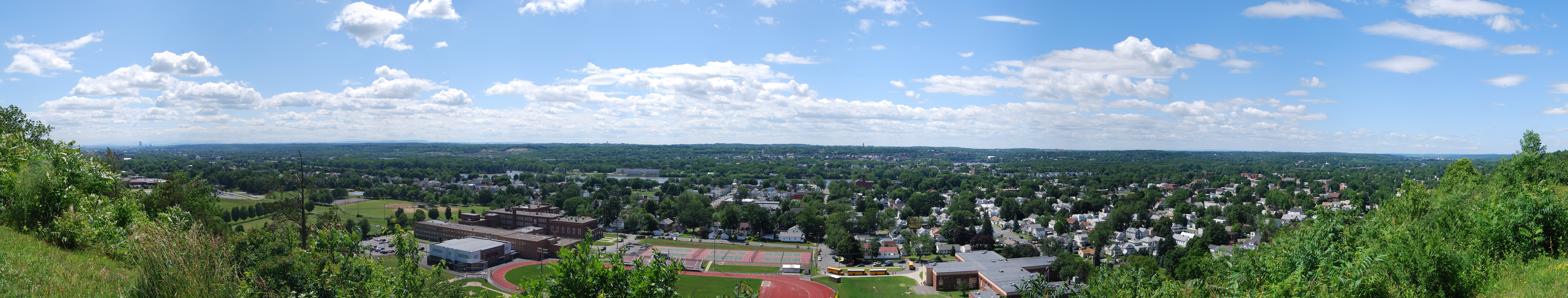
Recreation of Wall's photo The Panorama showing the view from the prospect overlooking Lansingburgh

== Notable interments ==
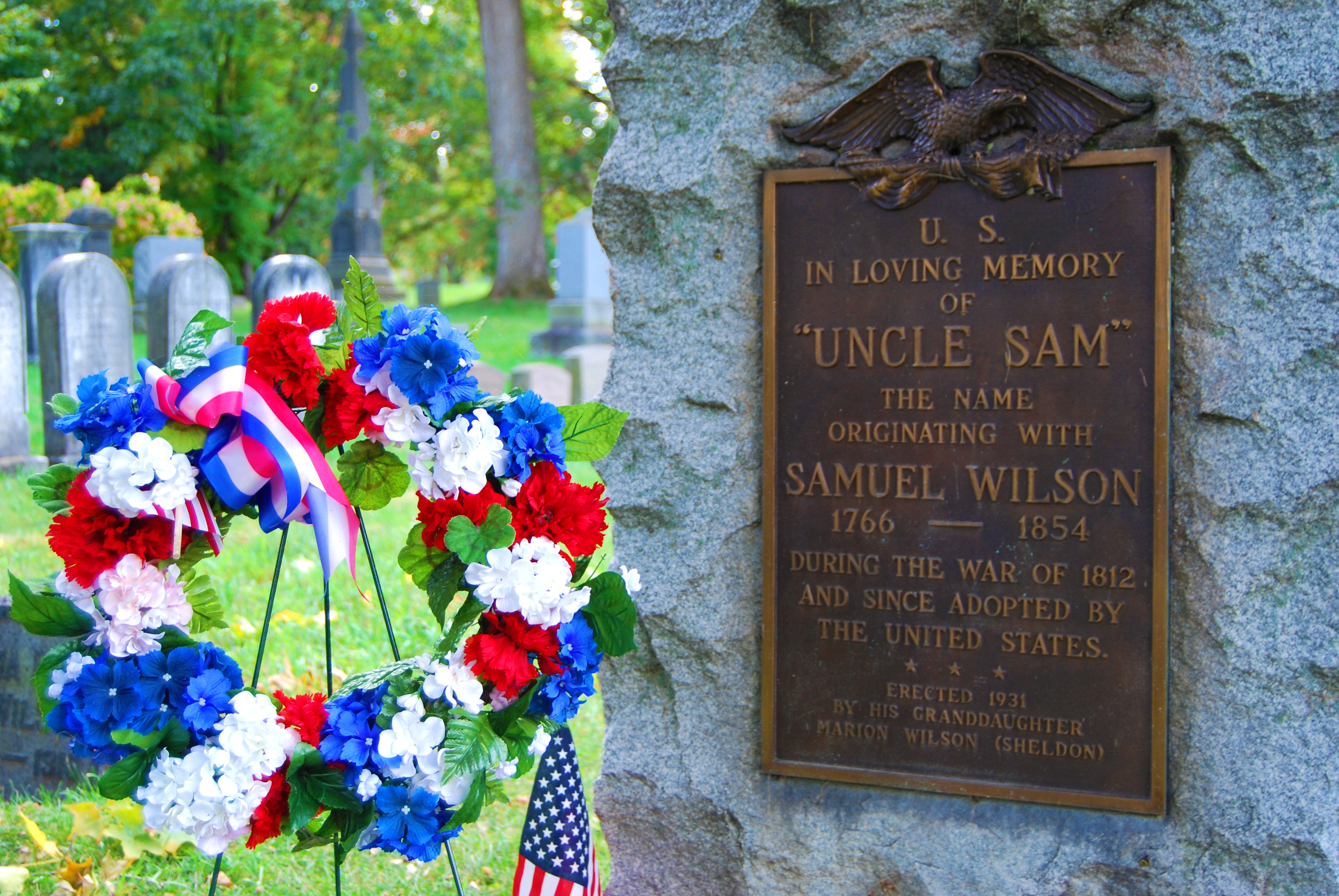
Gravestone of Samuel Wilson, progenitor of Uncle Sam

There are a number of historically prominent figures buried at Oakwood. At least fourteen members of the United States House of Representatives (all from New York) are buried there, including E. Harold Cluett, John Paine Cushman, John Dean Dickinson, William Henry Draper, Edward Whitford Greenman, Job Pierson, Russell Sage, Dean Park Taylor, John Richardson Thurman, George Tibbits, Martin Ingham Townsend, Henry Vail, Joseph Mabbett Warren (also the mayor of Troy), and Eliphalet Wickes. The cemetery also has its fair share of military men, such as Joseph Bradford Carr, a general during the Civil War; John Augustus Griswold, a promoter of ironclad ships and manufacturer of iron panels for the USS Monitor; Commodore Cicero Price (1805–1888), who served in the American Civil War and commanded the East India Squadron; George Henry Thomas, a general during the American Civil War, nicknamed the "Rock of Chickamauga"; and John E. Wool, commander-in-chief of the American forces during the Mexican–American War. Phineas D. Ballou, who served as mayor of Burlington, Vermont, spent part of his youth residing in Troy and was buried at Oakwood after his accidental death in 1877.

The founders of Troy and Lansingburgh, Jacob D. Vanderheyden and Abraham Jacob Lansing respectively, were both re-interred at Oakwood, having been moved there from downtown in 1869. Some of education's finest teachers are also buried there, including Amos Eaton, a well-known botanist and geologist and founder of Rensselaer Polytechnic Institute; Mary Warren, founder of America's first educational institution for "problem children"; Emma Willard, pioneer of women's education and founder of the Troy Female Seminary, which was later renamed Emma Willard School in her honor; Emma Willard's husband John Willard; and David Hillhouse Buel, a president of Georgetown University. John C. Baker, A U.S. Army major general who commanded the 42nd Infantry Division and served as Adjutant General of New York, is buried at Oakwood. Finally, Oakwood is also the final resting place of Samuel Wilson, the progenitor of America's national symbol, Uncle Sam.

== See also ==
- National Register of Historic Places listings in Rensselaer County, New York
- List of cemeteries in New York

== Bibliography ==
- Ballard, Harlan Hoge (1897). Amos Eaton. Pittsfield, Massachusetts: Berkshire Historical and Scientific Society. OCLC 51603637.(Full text via Google Books.)
- Bliss, William Dwight Porter (1897). The encyclopedia of social reform. New York City: Funk & Wagnells Company. OCLC 123756902.(Full text via Google Books.)
- Cobb, John Storer (1901). A quartercentury of cremation in North America: being a report of progress in the United States and Canada for the last quarter of the nineteenth century; to which have been added, as an afterthought, a few words about the advance in Europe during the same period. Boston: Knight and Millet. OCLC 4730641.(Full text via Google Books.)
- The Encyclopedia Americana: a library of universal knowledge, Volume 27. Encyclopedia Americana Corp. 1920. OCLC 18548585.(Full text via Google Books.)
- Harrison, A. Rebecca. "National Register of Historic Places Registration nomination, New York SP Oakwood Cemetery". National Archives and Records Administration.
- Richardson, Charles Henry (1917). Building stones and clays: a handbook for architects and engineers. Syracuse: Orange Publishing Company. OCLC 344779.(Full text via Google Books.)
- Ross, James H. (1894). A Martyr of To-Day: The Life of Robert Ross, Sacrificed to Municipal Misrule, A Story of Patriotism, Calling for Municipal Reforms. Boston: James H. Earle. OCLC 3790810.(Full text via Google Books.)
- Weise, Arthur James (1886). The city of Troy and its vicinity. Troy, New York: Edward Green. OCLC 8989214.(Full text via Google Books.)
