= William McManus =

American politician

Member of the U.S. House of Representatives from New York's 9th district
- In office March 4, 1825 – March 3, 1827
- Preceded by: James L. Hogeboom
- Succeeded by: John D. Dickinson

Personal details
- Born: William Telemachus McManus; November 28, 1780 Brunswick, New York
- Died: January 18, 1835 (aged 54) Brunswick, New York
- Occupation: Lawyer

William Telemachus McManus (November 28, 1780 – January 18, 1835) was an American lawyer and politician from New York.

== Life ==
He was the son of Hugh McManus (1747–1826) and Mary McManus (1751–1834). He attended Lansingburgh Academy. Then he studied law with John Bird, was admitted to the bar, and commenced practice in Troy, New York. He married Catharina Coons, and they had four children, among them Jane (McManus) Cazneau (1807–1878). He was Surrogate of Rensselaer County from 1815 to 1818, and District Attorney from 1818 to 1821.

McManus was elected as an Adams man to the 19th United States Congress, holding office from March 4, 1825, to March 3, 1827. Afterwards he resumed the practice of law.

In 1832, McManus ventured into land speculation, and was one of the founders of the Galveston Bay and Texas Land Company. The next year, he set out with his son Robert, his daughter Jane and a company of German settlers for Texas, which was then still part of Mexico. The scheme failed when the German settlers refused to go beyond Matagorda, and McManus returned with his daughter to Brunswick, NY, in 1834, and died there soon after. His son Robert remained in Texas and became a wealthy planter.

== Sources ==
- United States Congress. "William McManus (id: M000562)". Biographical Directory of the United States Congress.
- The New York Civil List compiled by Franklin Benjamin Hough (pages 71, 380 and 417; Weed, Parsons and Co., 1858)
- CAZNEAU, Jane Mary Eliza McManus Storms in Notable American Women by Edward T. James & Janet Wilson James (1971; pages 315ff)

U.S. House of Representatives
| Preceded by James L. Hogeboom | Member of the U.S. House of Representatives from New York's 9th congressional district 1825–1827 | Succeeded by John D. Dickinson |
