= Stow (surname) =

Stow is a surname. Notable people with the name include:

- Alexander Montague Stow (1873–1936), British administrator in India
- Alexander W. Stow (1805–1854), American jurist
- Augustine Stow (1833–1903), South Australian politician
- Baron Stow, (1801–1869), American Baptist minister, writer and editor
- Callum Stow (born 2002), Australian cricketer
- David Stow (1793–1864), Scottish educationalist
- Gardner Stow (c. 1789–1866), American lawyer
- George William Stow (1822–1882), English-born South African geologist and ethnologist
- Hamilton Hobart Stow (1837–1905), American oil well operator
- Horatio J. Stow (c. 1809–1859), New York lawyer and politician
- James Stow (c. 1770–in or after 1823), English engraver
- Jefferson Stow (1830–1908), English-born newspaper editor and magistrate in South Australia
- Jennifer Stow, Australian biologist
- John Stow (c. 1525–1605), English historian and antiquarian
- Sir John Montague Stow (1911–1997), politician from Barbados
- John Stow (priest), Archdeacon of Bermuda from 1951 to 1961
- Joshua Stow (1762–1842), founder of Stow, Ohio
- Marietta Stow (1830 or 1837–1902), American suffragist
- Montague Stow (1847–1911), English cricketer and lawyer
- Orson William Stow (1820–1883), American politician
- Percy Stow (1876–1919), British director of short films
- Randolph Stow (1935–2010), Australian writer
- Randolph Isham Stow (1828–1878), English-born Australian judge
- Selina Catherine Stow (1870–1956), British botanist
- Silas Stow (1773–1827), American politician
- Thomas Stow (1801–1862), English-born Australian pioneer Congregational clergyman
- Vincent Stow (1883–1968), English cricketer and educator
- William W. Stow (1824–1895), American politician

== See also ==
- Stow (disambiguation)
