= J. M. Adams =

American politician

Member of the Wisconsin State Assembly from the Oconto–Shawano district
- In office January 3, 1870 – January 2, 1871
- Preceded by: Parlan Semple
- Succeeded by: Parlan Semple

Personal details
- Born: May 4, 1834 Castleton, Vermont, U.S.
- Died: October 19, 1875 (aged 41) Oconto, Wisconsin, U.S.
- Resting place: Evergreen Cemetery, Oconto
- Party: Democratic
- Children: at least 1 daughter
- Education: Rush Medical College
- Profession: Physician

James M. Adams of Oconto, Wisconsin (May 4, 1834 – October 19, 1875) was an American medical doctor, politician, and Wisconsin pioneer. He served in the Wisconsin State Assembly, representing Oconto County.

== Biography ==
James M. Adams was born in Castleton, Vermont, in May 1834. He received a common school education and attended Rush Medical College in Chicago. He moved to Wisconsin in 1852 and initially settled at Greenbush, Wisconsin, in Sheboygan County. He moved to Oconto County, Wisconsin, sometime before 1869 and was elected to represent the county in the Wisconsin State Assembly for the 1870 session.

He died in his sleep and was discovered by his daughter on the morning of October 19, 1875.

Wisconsin State Assembly
Preceded by Parlan Semple	Member of the Wisconsin State Assembly from the Oconto–Shawano district January 3, 1870 – January 2, 1871	Succeeded by Parlan Semple
