= Senator Lamont =

Senator Lamont may refer to:

- George D. Lamont (1819–1876), New York State Senate
- William C. Lamont (1827–?), New York State Senate
