= Stow =

Stow may refer to:

== Places ==
=== United Kingdom ===
- Stow, Lincolnshire or Stow-in-Lindsey, a village
- Stow of Wedale or Stow, Scottish Borders, a village
- Stow Longa, a Cambridgeshire village
- Stow-on-the-Wold, Gloucestershire, a small town
- Stow, Shropshire or Stowe, a village
- Stow cum Quy, a parish near Cambridge
- Stow Bardolph, Norfolk, an estate and parish
- Stow Hundred, a former hundred of Suffolk
- West Stow, a village and parish in Suffolk

==== Informally called "Stow" ====
- Stowmarket, a town in Suffolk
- Walthamstow, an area in northeast London

=== United States ===
- Stow, Maine, a town
- Stow, Massachusetts, a town
- Stow, New York, a hamlet
- Stow, Ohio, a city
- Stow Creek (New Jersey), a tributary of Delaware Bay
- Stow Lake, former name of Blue Heron Lake in Golden Gate Park, San Francisco, California

=== Elsewhere ===
- Hundred of Stow, a cadastral unit of South Australia

== People ==
- Stow (surname)
- Stow Wengenroth (1906–1978), American artist and lithographer

== Other uses ==
- Stow College, Glasgow, Scotland
- Stow Fair, Lincolnshire, England, a lost medieval fair
- Walthamstow Stadium or The Stow, a former greyhound track in East London
- GNU Stow, software for managing the installation of software packages

== See also ==
- Stow Abbey, an abbey in Lincolnshire, England
- Stow Heath, an area and ancient manor in the city of Wolverhampton, West Midlands, England
- Stow House, Goleta, California, United States, on the National Register of Historic places
- Stow Lodge, a listed building in Stowmarket, Suffolk, England
- Scotts of Stow, the flagship brand of Scotts & Co
- Stowe (disambiguation)
- Stowers (disambiguation)
