= Richard W. Hubbell =

19th century American politician

District Attorney of Oconto County, Wisconsin
- In office January 1, 1878 – January 1, 1880
- Preceded by: H. M. Woodmansee
- Succeeded by: O. F. Trudell

County Judge of Oconto County, Wisconsin
- In office January 1, 1870 – January 1, 1878
- Preceded by: Joseph Hall
- Succeeded by: Albert Reinhart

Member of the Wisconsin State Assembly from the Oconto district
- In office January 1, 1872 – January 5, 1874
- Preceded by: Parlan Semple (Oconto–Shawano)
- Succeeded by: Henry M. Royce

Personal details
- Born: November 8, 1840 Ithaca, New York, U.S.
- Died: April 5, 1910 (aged 69) Wautoma, Wisconsin, U.S.
- Resting place: Wautoma Union Cemetery, Wautoma, Wisconsin
- Party: Republican
- Spouse: Emily Towner Snover (m. 1871–1910)
- Children: Susan E. (Flowers)^{(b. 1871; died 1944)}; Emil Hubbell^{(b. 1872)}; Theodore Dewitt Hubbell^{(b. 1872; died 1940)}; Kittie Snover Hubbell^{(b. 1876; died 1877)}; Richard Sinclair Hubbell^{(b. 1877; died 1953)}; Marjorie Elinor (Rhoads)^{(b. 1888; died 1956)}
- Parent: Levi Hubbell (father)
- Education: University of Wisconsin
- Profession: Lawyer, judge

Military service
- Allegiance: United States
- Branch/service: United States Volunteers; Union Army
- Years of service: 1862–1865
- Rank: Major, USV
- Unit: 24th Reg. Wis. Vol. Infantry; 1st Reg. Wis. Heavy Artillery
- Battles/wars: American Civil War

Richard Walter Hubbell (November 8, 1840 – April 5, 1910) was an American lawyer, politician, and judge. He was a member of the Wisconsin State Assembly, representing Oconto County during the 1872 and 1873 sessions, and also served as county judge and district attorney. In the American Civil War, he served as a Union Army artillery officer. He was a son of Levi Hubbell—the first Wisconsin state official to be impeached.

== Early life and education ==
Born in Ithaca, New York, Hubbell moved with his parents to Wisconsin Territory in 1844 and settled in Milwaukee. Hubbell's father was a prominent lawyer and judge in these days, and afforded a good education for his sons. Hubbell attended a college preparatory course in 1853, and then attended the University of Wisconsin from 1854 through 1858, graduating with a bachelor's degree. Hubbell flourished at the university and was one of the charter members there of the Hesperia literary society, along with his lifelong friend William Freeman Vilas. Hubbell subsequently earned his master's degree in 1861, and was admitted to the bar in 1862.

== Civil War service ==
In the second year of the war, as new calls were being made for volunteers to the Union Army, Hubbell saw several of his university classmates joining the service. William F. Vilas recruited a company for the 23rd Wisconsin Infantry Regiment, which Hubbell sought to join, but was too late to register a spot. He instead joined a company for the 24th Wisconsin Infantry Regiment, and was enrolled as a sergeant in Company I of that regiment.

He served only a few months with the 24th Wisconsin Infantry, but saw serious combat with them at the Battle of Perryville. In the Winter of 1862–1863, he accepted a commission to become a first lieutenant in the 1st Wisconsin Heavy Artillery Regiment. With the 1st Wisconsin Heavy Artillery, he served with Battery B, which was stationed for the rest of the war at forts in Kentucky and Tennessee. He was promoted to captain of his battery in July 1864, and was then made a major in the regiment in September 1864. He mustered out with the rest of the regiment in June 1865.

== Legal and political career ==
After the war, Hubbell moved to Oconto, Wisconsin, and established a legal practice. Hubbell became active with the Republican Party of Wisconsin and first ran for Wisconsin State Assembly in 1867. He failed in that campaign, but was subsequently elected to two consecutive terms, serving in the 1872 and 1873 sessions. In the meantime, he was also elected to two four-year terms as county judge for Oconto County, serving in that office from 1870 through 1878. In the 1877 election, rather than running again for judge, he ran for and was elected district attorney, for a two-year term.

In 1890, Hubbell moved to Wautoma, Wisconsin, without his family and continued to practice law. He died at his home in Wautoma in 1910, he had been in ill health.

== Personal life and family ==
Richard Hubbell was one of at least four children of Levi Hubbell, a Wisconsin pioneer lawyer and judge who served in Wisconsin's first state supreme court and was the first state official to be impeached by the Wisconsin Legislature. He was not convicted in his impeachment trial, and later served as United States Attorney for Wisconsin.

Richard's grandfather, Abijah Hubbell, served in the American Revolutionary War. The Hubbells were descendants of Richard Hubbell, an English immigrant who came to the Connecticut Colony about 1650.

Richard W. Hubbell married Emily Snover in 1871. They had at least six children, but at least one died in infancy.

In addition to his legal career, Hubbell was a lifelong literary enthusiast and wrote his own poetry and prose. For much of his life, including his final years, Hubbell wrote for and edited the Wisconsin Alumni Magazine in its various incarnations. Near the end of his life, he published several of his poems in the magazine.

He was also apparently a fishing enthusiast, and authored a pamphlet on fly fishing, titled Hints on Fly Fishing.

== Electoral history ==
=== Wisconsin Assembly (1871, 1872) ===
Wisconsin Assembly, Oconto District Election, 1871
Party	Candidate	Votes	%	±%
General Election, November 7, 1871
Republican	Richard W. Hubbell	646	66.05%	
Democratic	J. W. Couillard	332	33.95%	
Plurality		314	32.11%	
Total votes		978	100.0%	
Republican win (new seat)				

Wisconsin Assembly, Oconto District Election, 1872
Party	Candidate	Votes	%	±%
General Election, November 5, 1872
Republican	Richard W. Hubbell (incumbent)	945	64.95%	−1.10%
Democratic	Ely Wright	510	35.05%	
Plurality		435	29.90%	-2.21%
Total votes		1,455	100.0%	+48.77%
Republican hold				

Wisconsin State Assembly
Preceded by Parlan Semple (Oconto–Shawano)	Member of the Wisconsin State Assembly from the Oconto district January 1, 1872 – January 5, 1874	Succeeded by Henry M. Royce
Legal offices
Preceded by Joseph Hall	County Judge of Oconto County, Wisconsin; January 1, 1870 – January 1, 1878	Succeeded by Albert Reinhart
Preceded by H. M. Woodmansee	District Attorney of Oconto County, Wisconsin; January 1, 1878 – January 1, 1880	Succeeded by O. F. Trudell
