= Cuyahoga Falls, Ohio =

- City
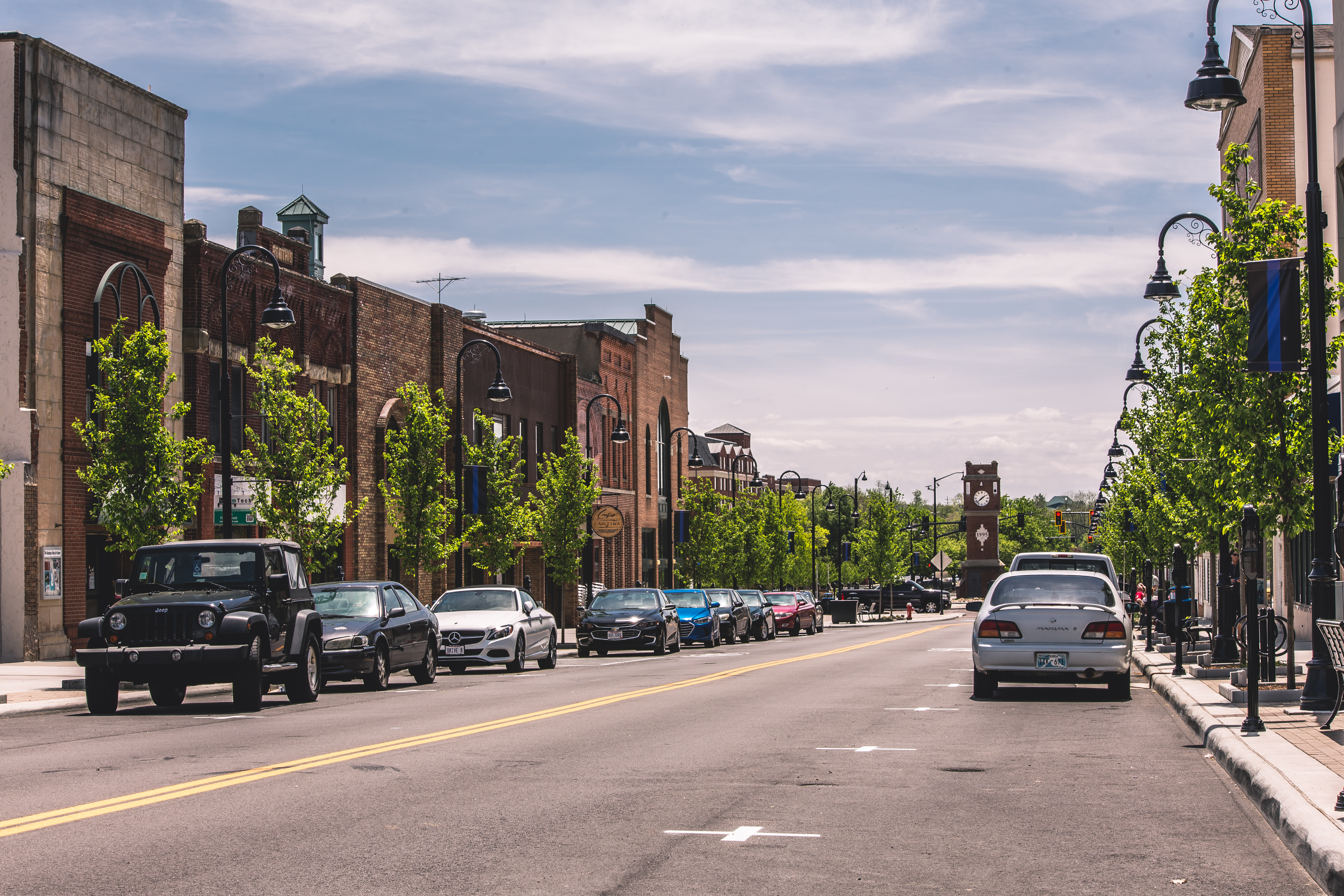
- Downtown Cuyahoga Falls (2018)

- Seal
- Interactive map of Cuyahoga Falls, Ohio
- Location within Ohio Location within the United States
- Coordinates: 41°08′44″N 81°29′48″W
- Country: United States
- State: Ohio
- County: Summit

Area
  - Total: 25.92 sq mi (67.14 km^{2})
  - Land: 25.80 sq mi (66.81 km^{2})
  - Water: 0.13 sq mi (0.33 km^{2})
- Elevation: 1,040 ft (320 m)

Population (2020)
  - Total: 51,114
  - Estimate (2023): 50,742
  - Density: 1,981.5/sq mi (765.05/km^{2})
- Time zone: UTC−5 (EST)
  - Summer (DST): UTC−4 (EDT)
- ZIP codes: 44221 and 44223
- Area codes: 330 and 234
- FIPS code: 39-19778
- GNIS feature ID: 1087001
- Website: cityofcf.com

Cuyahoga Falls (/ˌkaɪəˈhoʊɡə/ KY-ə-HOH-gə or /ˌkaɪəˈhɒɡə/ KY-ə-HOG-ə) is a city in Summit County, Ohio, United States. The population was 51,114 at the 2020 census. The second-largest city in Summit County, it is located directly north of Akron and is a suburb in the Cleveland-Akron-Canton metropolitan area of Northeast Ohio. The city was founded in 1812 by William Wetmore and was originally named Manchester, but renamed for the Cuyahoga River and the series of waterfalls that run along the southern boundary of the city.

== History ==
Cuyahoga Falls was formed in 1812 near the junction of what was then Northampton, Stow, Tallmadge, and Portage townships. The focus was the series of Cuyahoga River waterfalls that provided power for manufacturing.

In 1812, Kelsey and Wilcox built a dam on the Cuyahoga River at a place where a railroad bridge crossed it in 1876. They then built a flour mill, an oil mill, and a saw mill. This led to the construction of a number of houses. This area was known as the old village. Development moved downstream, though, when the power was discovered to be better there. The old village was eventually destroyed in 1826, when a dam built by William Wetmore flooded the dam at the old village and its mills were torn down.

The earliest settlers of Cuyahoga Falls included Joshua Stow and William Wetmore. In 1815, a saw mill was operating near Gaylord's Grove, using power generated by a dam on the Cuyahoga River there.

The town was initially called Manchester, but was renamed Cuyahoga Falls at the request of the Post Office since several other Manchesters were already in Ohio. The village proper was first laid out in 1826 by Judge Richardson. The town was incorporated in 1836, occupying 240 rods from Stow and Tallmadge townships. In 1853, seeing that the village and township of Cuyahoga Falls occupied the same territory, the village council disbanded and the community was only a township until 1868.

In 1841, the Summit County Board of Commissioners named Cuyahoga Falls the county seat, but the state legislature intervened. It determined the county seat should be decided by popular vote. Akron won and has been the county seat ever since. Therefore, despite being named the county seat, Cuyahoga Falls never really functioned as such.

In March 1851, the township of Cuyahoga Falls was created out of the village limits. They covered the same territory, so the village council voted to adjourn sine die, letting the village be run under township jurisdiction until June 3, 1868, when the municipal government returned.

In 1939 the first Lawson Convenience Store was established in Cuyahoga Falls.

On July 31, 1940, the Doodlebug Disaster train wreck killed 43 people, the worst disaster in the history of the city.

In 1985, a referendum of merger between the city and neighboring Northampton Township was approved by local voters. In 1986, Cuyahoga Falls merged with Northampton Township, the first merger of a city and township in Ohio.

Cuyahoga Falls had been founded as an industrial city, taking advantage of the river power. By the middle of the twentieth century, it had become largely residential. Don Robart, mayor from 1986 to 2013, promoted the merger with Northampton Township because of the additional land that could be used for development. Parts of that area have since been used for industrial development. Commercial development has also picked up, especially in the Howe Avenue area at the southern border of the city.

The city had one professional sports team, the Cuyahoga Falls Cougars, of the International Basketball League. They moved to Akron in 2006 and became the Akron Cougars.

The Cathedral of Tomorrow, founded by televangelist Rex Humbard in 1958, was in Cuyahoga Falls. The complex was later purchased by pastor and evangelist Ernest Angley, who renamed it Grace Cathedral.

Blossom Music Center, an outdoor concert venue and the summer home of the Cleveland Orchestra since 1968, is situated on 800 acres of the Cuyahoga Valley National Park in Cuyahoga Falls.

== Geography ==
According to the United States Census Bureau, the city has an area of 25.75 square miles (66.69 km^{2}), of which 25.65 square miles (66.43 km^{2}) is land and 0.10 square miles (0.26 km^{2}) is water.

Cuyahoga Falls is bordered by Akron to the south, Boston Township to the north, Bath Township to the west, and Stow and Silver Lake to the east. The city includes parts of Cuyahoga Valley National Park, most of which lies to its northwest.

== Demographics ==
Historical population
Census	Pop.	Note	%±
1860	1,516		—
1870	1,861		22.8%
1880	2,294		23.3%
1890	2,614		13.9%
1900	3,186		21.9%
1910	4,020		26.2%
1920	10,200		153.7%
1930	19,797		94.1%
1940	20,546		3.8%
1950	29,195		42.1%
1960	47,922		64.1%
1970	49,678		3.7%
1980	43,708		−12.0%
1990	48,950		12.0%
2000	49,374		0.9%
2010	49,652		0.6%
2020	51,114		2.9%
2025 (est.)	50,975		−0.3%
U.S. Decennial Census

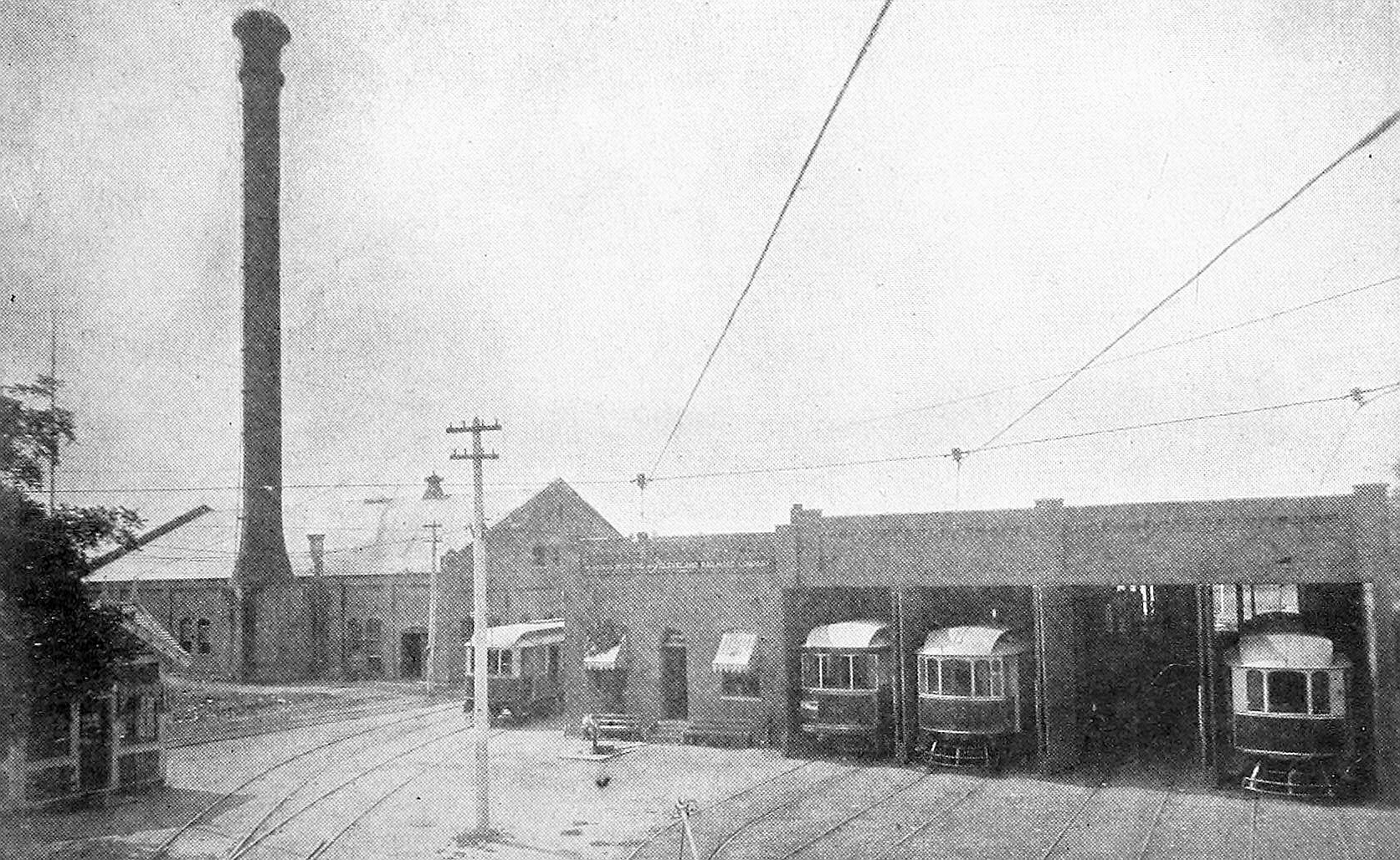
Akron, Bedford and Cleveland Railroad shops at Cuyahoga Falls, 1899

Cuyahoga Falls is part of the Akron, OH Metropolitan Statistical Area and of the Cleveland-Akron-Canton Combined Statistical Area.

=== 2020 census ===
As of the 2020 census, Cuyahoga Falls had a population of 51,114. The median age was 40.1 years. 18.8% of residents were under the age of 18 and 18.8% of residents were 65 years of age or older. For every 100 females there were 92.3 males, and for every 100 females age 18 and over there were 90.3 males age 18 and over.

97.4% of residents lived in urban areas, while 2.6% lived in rural areas.

There were 23,406 households in Cuyahoga Falls, of which 22.9% had children under the age of 18 living in them. Of all households, 39.2% were married-couple households, 21.2% were households with a male householder and no spouse or partner present, and 31.3% were households with a female householder and no spouse or partner present. About 37.7% of all households were made up of individuals and 14.4% had someone living alone who was 65 years of age or older.

There were 24,827 housing units, of which 5.7% were vacant. The homeowner vacancy rate was 1.1% and the rental vacancy rate was 6.3%.

Racial composition as of the 2020 census
Race	Number	Percent
White	42,872	83.9%
Black or African American	2,423	4.7%
American Indian and Alaska Native	121	0.2%
Asian	2,565	5.0%
Native Hawaiian and Other Pacific Islander	11	0.0%
Some other race	429	0.8%
Two or more races	2,693	5.3%
Hispanic or Latino (of any race)	1,113	2.2%

=== 2010 census ===
As of the census of 2010, there were 49,652 people, 22,250 households, and 12,693 families living in the city. The population density was 1,935.8 inhabitants per square mile (747.4/km^{2}). There were 23,859 housing units at an average density of 930.2 per square mile (359.2/km^{2}). The racial makeup of the city was 93.4% White, 3.3% African American, 0.2% Native American, 1.2% Asian, 0.3% from other races, and 1.6% from two or more races. Hispanic or Latino of any race were 1.4% of the population.

There were 22,250 households, of which 26.1% had children under age 18 living with them, 41.9% were married couples living together, 11.4% had a female householder with no husband present, 3.7% had a male householder with no wife present, and 43.0% were non-families. 35.6% of all households were made up of individuals, and 12.1% had someone living alone who was 65 years of age or older. The average household size was 2.21 and the average family size was 2.90.

The median age in the city was 39.4 years. 20.9% of residents were under the age of 18; 8.5% were between the ages of 18 and 24; 27.9% were from 25 to 44; 27.5% were from 45 to 64; and 15.3% were 65 years of age or older. The gender makeup of the city was 47.3% male and 52.7% female.

=== 2000 census ===
As of the census of 2000, there were 49,374 people, 21,655 households, and 13,317 families living in the city. The population density was 1,932.9 inhabitants per square mile (746.3/km^{2}). There were 22,727 housing units at an average density of 889.7 per square mile (343.5/km^{2}). The racial makeup of the city was 95.80% White, 1.87% African American, 0.20% Native American, 1.05% Asian, 0.01% Pacific Islander, 0.15% from other races, and 0.91% from two or more races. Hispanic or Latino of any race were 0.63% of the population.

There were 21,655 households, of which 27.0% had children under age 18 living with them, 48.3% were married couples living together, 10.1% had a female householder with no husband present, and 38.5% were non-families. 32.6% of all households were made up of individuals, and 12.3% had someone living alone who was 65 years of age or older. The average household size was 2.26 and the average family size was 2.90.

In the city, the population was spread out, with 22.5% under the age of 18, 7.9% from 18 to 24, 32.0% from 25 to 44, 21.5% from 45 to 64, and 16.1% who were 65 years of age or older. The median age was 37 years. For every 100 females, there were 90.3 males. For every 100 females age 18 and over, there were 86.5 males.

The median income for a household in the city was $42,263, and the median income for a family was $52,372. Males had a median income of $40,301 versus $28,459 for females. The per capita income for the city was $22,550. About 4.5% of families and 6.1% of the population were below the poverty line, including 8.0% of those under age 18 and 4.2% of those age 65 or over.

== Transportation ==
METRO Regional Transit Authority provides bus service in the city.

== Education ==
Cuyahoga Falls is mainly served by two school districts. The original area of the city makes up nearly all of the Cuyahoga Falls City School District; its high school, Cuyahoga Falls High School, is located near downtown. The neighboring village of Silver Lake is also part of Cuyahoga Falls City Schools.

The northwest portion of the city (the former Northampton Township) is served by the Woodridge Local School District, which also serves the portions of Akron that lie within the former Northampton Township boundaries, as well as most of Boston Township (including Peninsula). That district's high school, Woodridge High School, is also located in Cuyahoga Falls (albeit with a Peninsula mailing address); this makes Cuyahoga Falls one of the few communities in Ohio that is home to the sole high school for two separate school districts.

A small area in the northeast of the city is zoned to Hudson City School District, and another small area, in the far northwest of the city, is part of the Revere Local School District.

== Notable people ==
- Jim Ballard — professional football player in the Arena Football League
- Robert Berdella — serial killer
- Vernon Cook — member of the Ohio House of Representatives, 1973–1987
- Kyle Craven – the face of the "Bad Luck Brian" internet meme
- Grace Adele Freebey — composer and pianist
- Chrissie Hynde — musician and founding member of The Pretenders
- Jane Jacobs – professional baseball player in the All-American Girls Professional Baseball League
- Jim Jarmusch — film director
- David Kerr — baseball executive and general manager of the Mississippi Mud Monsters
- Joseph Kitchen — professor at the University of Southern California
- Bob Lewis — musician and founder of Devo
- Michael Morell — director of the Central Intelligence Agency (CIA)
- Elisha Noyes Sill — banker and politician
- Frank Stams — professional football player in the National Football League (NFL)
- Jack Thompson — activist, attorney
- Mike Vrabel — professional football player and coach in the NFL
