= Peter P. Murphy =

American politician

Peter Patrick Murphy (July 18, 1801 Albany, New York – January 20, 1880 Royalton, Niagara County, New York) was an American medical doctor and politician from New York. He was also a Free Mason.

== Life ==
He was the son of Peter Murphy (c.1779–1844) and Catherine (Conner) Murphy (c.1781–1846). He attended The Albany Academy. In 1820, he removed to Herkimer County, and taught school. Then he studied medicine in Cherry Valley, graduated from Fairfield Medical College in 1827, and practiced medicine in Stark. On December 30, 1827, he married Anna Kayner (b. 1806), and they had several children.

As a Democrat, he was a member of the New York State Assembly (Herkimer Co.) in 1835. Afterwards he resumed the practice of medicine in Royalton, New York. In 1848, he joined the Free Soil Party, and in 1855 became a Republican. He was a delegate to the 1856 Republican National Convention. He was Supervisor of the Town of Royalton for one term; and a member of the New York State Senate (29th D.) in 1860 and 1861.

== Sources ==
- The New York Civil List compiled by Franklin Benjamin Hough, Stephen C. Hutchins and Edgar Albert Werner (1867; pg. 364 and 442)
- Biographical Sketches of the State Officers and Members of the Legislature of the State of New York by William D. Murphy (1861; pg. 97ff)
- Marriage records of the Reformed Church of Columbia, Herkimer Co.
- Bio at Herkimer NY Gen Web

New York State Senate
Preceded by George D. Lamont	New York State Senate; 29th District; 1860–1861	Succeeded by Almanzor Hutchinson
