= Joshua Stow =

American politician (1762–1842)

The Honorable Joshua Stow
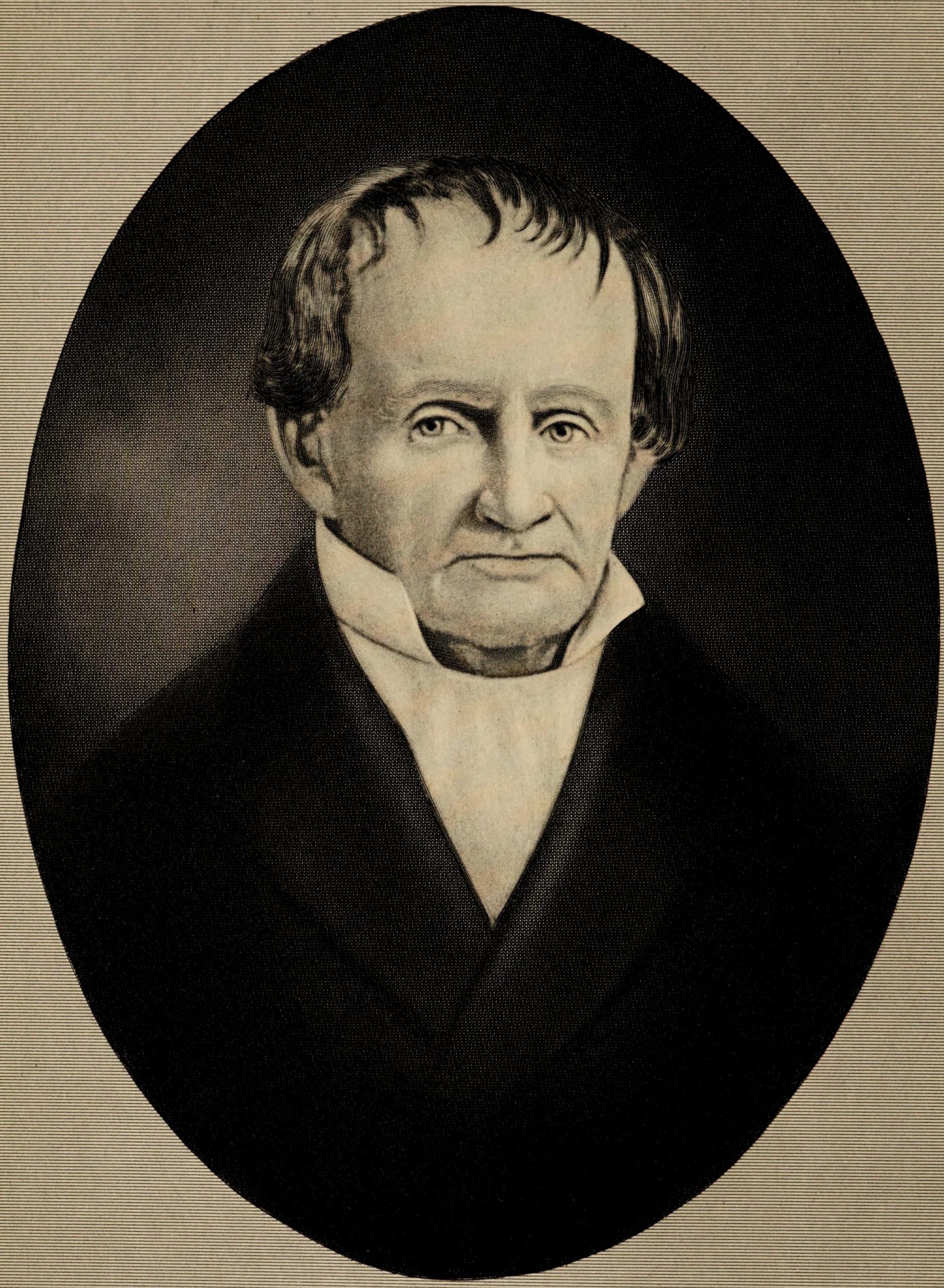

Judge of Middlesex County Court
- In office 1823–1826
- Preceded by: Asher Miller
- Succeeded by: Samuel W. Dana

Member of the Connecticut House of Representatives from the Middletown district
- In office May 9, 1805 – May 8, 1806 Serving with Elijah Hubbard
- Preceded by: Asher Miller
- Succeeded by: John Pratt

Personal details
- Born: April 22, 1762 Middlefield, Connecticut Colony, British America
- Died: October 10, 1842 (aged 80) Middlefield, Connecticut, U.S.
- Resting place: Middlefield Cemetery, Middlefield, Connecticut
- Spouse: Ruth Coe (m. 1786; died 1815)
- Children: Julia Stowe Hale^{(b. 1786; died 1843)}; Laura Stow Coe^{(b. 1790; died 1834)}; Robert Stow^{(b. 1818; died 1907)}
- Parents: Elihu Stow (father); Jemima (Paine) Stow (mother)
- Relatives: Silas Stow (brother); Alexander W. Stow (nephew); Horatio J. Stow (nephew); Alfred Kelley (nephew)

Military service
- Allegiance: United States
- Branch/service: Continental Army
- Unit: 1st Connecticut Regiment
- Battles/wars: American Revolutionary War

Joshua Stow (April 22, 1762 – October 10, 1842) was an American lawyer, judge, and pioneer. He was the founder of Stow, Ohio, served in the Connecticut House of Representatives, and was a judge of Middlesex County, Connecticut.

== Biography ==
Born in Middlefield, Connecticut, (then the Connecticut Colony, part of British America) as a young man, he volunteered for service in the American Revolutionary War, serving under Colonel Heman Swift from 1781 until the end of the war. After the war, he was employed as a surveyor and accompanied Moses Cleaveland on his 1796 mission to survey what was then called the Connecticut Western Reserve (now northeastern Ohio). The Connecticut Western Reserve was a patch of land claimed by the state of Connecticut due to the language of their original charter from King Charles II of England.

On the Ohio mission, which surveyed the area around the mouth of the Cuyahoga River where it meets Lake Erie, Stow was the company's commissary manager, responsible for seeing that the survey party was equipped with clothing, equipment, food, drink, and lodging. He was also a financial holder in the Ohio Land Company which conducted the land survey of 1796 of which Moses Cleaveland was the Superintendent. When Stow saw the forested future township, he said it was "one of the prettiest and most romantic spots in the Western Reserve". He purchased the whole five-mile square of Stow Township as an investment, for $14,154.

After he returned to Connecticut, he hired a relative, Judge William Wetmore, to travel to Stow and settle there. Wetmore would handle further sales of land in Stow. Wetmore took his family and several other men to Stow in the summer of 1804.

Although the township is named for him, Stow never lived there—he continued to reside in Connecticut. He made 13 trips here, the old stories say. Travel in those days was always arduous and frequently dangerous. People could either ride horseback through dense forests and over the Appalachian Mountains, following Indian trails, or they could brave the waters of Lake Erie in small boats and barges full of supplies. Either route would take them more than a month each way. Some of Stow's relatives did settle here, and a few of their descendants still live in Stow.

Back in Middletown (near Middlefield), Stow entered public office, serving in the Connecticut House of Representatives during the 1805 spring and fall sessions. In 1815, he was appointed postmaster, serving through April 1818, and returning to office from November 1821 through February 1841. He also served as tax collector, and, from 1823 through 1826, was judge of the Middlesex County Court.

He favored Thomas Jefferson in the presidential race of 1800, and thus became an enemy of the local Federalists, who wanted the social order to remain as it was: dominated by the Congregational Church. For over a century, one had to be a member of that church in order to hold public office in Connecticut.

Stow's convictions that the church should not be the center of the government led him to take an active role in Connecticut's constitutional convention in 1818. He wrote Article Seven of the state constitution, making it a matter of personal choice as to which church a person could join. When he was branded an "infidel" by a newspaper editor, Stow filed a libel suit against the paper. At the trial, even his brothers and sisters labeled his behavior "ungodly". He did win his suit, but continued to be criticized for such things as bringing ministers of other denominations to preach at Middlefield's Congregational Church. Stow was an active and dedicated member of the Universalist Church of Middletown, Connecticut.

Stow died October 10, 1842, aged 80, and was buried in the then new "Center Cemetery" (now Middlefield Cemetery) in Middlefield. An obelisk memorial was erected there with the epitaph:

Author of the Article securing religious freedom in the Constitution of his native State. To every species of tyranny and despotism a constant and indomitable foe.

Now rest in peace for the impartial page, 
Shall greet thee as an honor to our age,
Long in these climes thy memory shall remain
And still new tributes in new ages gain.

== Personal life and family ==
His ancestor, John Stow, was born in Kent County, England, and emigrated to Massachusetts Bay Colony in 1634 aboard the Elizabeth. His ancestors included the first minister in Middlefield, Connecticut, a Congregationalist. His younger brother, Silas Stow, served in the United States House of Representatives, and his nephew, Alexander W. Stow, was the 1st Chief Justice of the Wisconsin Supreme Court.

Joshua Stow married Ruth Coe in 1786; they had at least three children.
