= Elisha Noyes Sill =

American banker and politician

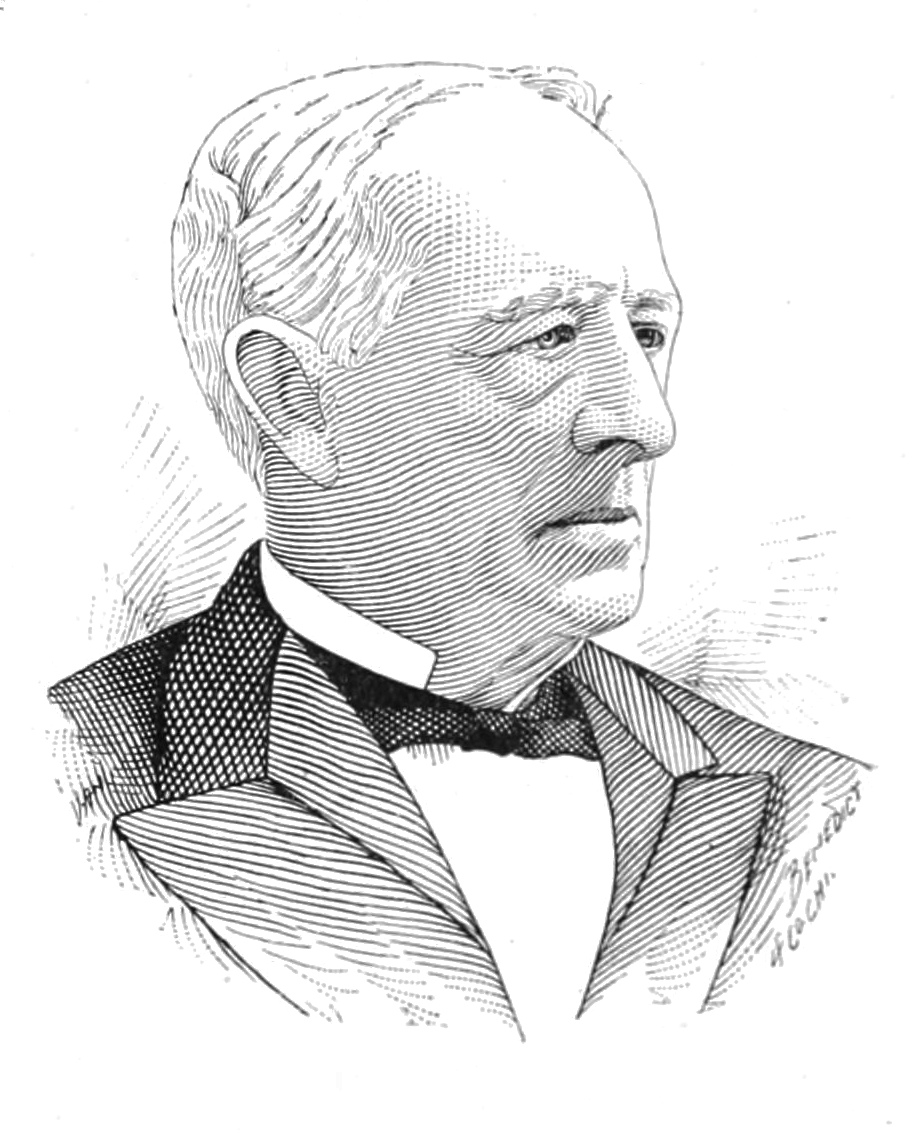
Elisha N. Sill

Elisha Noyes Sill (January 6, 1801 – April 26, 1888) was an American banker and politician.

Sill, the second son of Dr. Elisha N. and Chloe (Allyn) Sill, was born in Windsor, Connecticut, January 6, 1801.

He graduated from Yale College in 1820. After graduation, he studied theology for two years in the Andover Seminary, and afterwards taught school in Windsor. He married, Oct. 6, 1824, Elizabeth, eldest daughter of Henry and Elizabeth (Strong) Newberry, who had removed from Windsor to Ohio in the preceding June. Newberry founded the town of Cuyahoga Falls, Ohio and thither his son-in-law followed him in 1829, and for several years the two were associated in enterprises for the development of manufacturing and in improving the water-power of the Cuyahoga River at that place. Sill was then drawn into public life, and after serving in the lower House of the Legislature, was elected to the Ohio State Senate in 1844. After this he was appointed Fund Commissioner for the State, which office he held for seven years. His later life was mainly devoted to banking. He organized the National Bank at Cuyahoga Falls, and managed it for many years, besides being connected with the management of several other banks of the vicinity. He died in Cuyahoga Falls on April 26, 1888, in his 88th year.

His first wife died November 27, 1829, and he next married, June 17, 1834, her sister, Fanny Newberry, who died on February 14, 1849. He was a third time married, to the widow of Henry Cook, of Cuyahoga Falls, who also died before him. By his first marriage he had two sons, who both survived him; and by his second marriage two daughters, of whom only the elder survived him, the widow of Edward R. Sill.

This article incorporates public domain material from the 1888 Yale Obituary Record.
