= Josiah Masters =

American politician

Member of the U.S. House of Representatives from New York's 10th district
- In office March 4, 1805 – March 3, 1809
- Preceded by: George Tibbits
- Succeeded by: John Nicholson

Justice of the Peace of Schaghticoke, New York
- In office 1801–1805

Supervisor of Schaghticoke, New York
- In office 1796

Member of the New York State Assembly
- In office 1792, 1800, 1801

Personal details
- Born: November 22, 1763 Woodbury, Connecticut Colony, British America
- Died: June 30, 1822 (aged 58) Fairfield, Connecticut, U.S.
- Resting place: Masters Cemetery
- Party: Democratic-Republican
- Education: Yale College
- Profession: Politician, lawyer

Josiah Masters (November 22, 1763 – June 30, 1822) was a United States representative from New York. Born in Woodbury, Litchfield County, Connecticut, he graduated from Yale College in 1783. He studied law, was admitted to the bar and commenced practice in Schaghticoke, Rensselaer County, New York. He was a member of the New York State Assembly in 1792, 1800, and 1801, and served as supervisor of Schaghticoke in 1796. He was a justice of the peace in Rensselaer County from 1801 to 1805, was a trustee of Lansingburgh Academy, and was school commissioner of Schaghticoke.

Masters was elected as a Democratic-Republican to the Ninth and Tenth Congresses, holding office from March 4, 1805 to March 3, 1809. He was founder of the Schaghticoke Powder Co. and judge of the Court of Common Pleas of Rensselaer County from 1808 to 1822. He died in Fairfield, Connecticut in 1822; interment was in the Masters Cemetery, near Schaghticoke, New York.

U.S. House of Representatives
Preceded by George Tibbits	Member of the U.S. House of Representatives from New York's 10th congressional district 1805–1809	Succeeded by John Nicholson
