= Hosea Moffitt =

American politician

Member of the U.S. House of Representatives from New York's 10th district
- In office March 4, 1813 – March 3, 1817
- Preceded by: Silas Stow
- Succeeded by: John P. Cushman

Personal details
- Born: November 17, 1757 Killingly, Connecticut Colony, British America
- Died: August 31, 1825 (aged 67) Stephentown, New York, U.S.
- Party: Federalist

Hosea Moffitt (November 17, 1757 – August 31, 1825) was a U.S. representative from New York.

== Biography ==
Moffitt was born in Killingly in the Connecticut Colony on November 17, 1757. During the Revolutionary War he served in the Albany County Militia as an Ensign and later Lieutenant of the 4th Regiment (Van Rensselaer's Regiment), also called the 2nd Rensselaerwyck Battalion.

Moffitt studied law and was admitted to the bar. In addition to practicing as an attorney, he was the Stephentown agent for Stephen Van Rensselaer, whose Manor of Rensselaerswyck included Stephentown. Moffitt was also an active businessman and banker.

He served on the local school board, was named a Justice of the Peace in 1791, and he was Town Clerk in 1791 and 1797. He served as member of the New York State Assembly from 1794 to 1798, and again from 1800 to 1801.

He remained in the militia after the Revolution, and attained command of a brigade and the rank of Brigadier General.

He was elected Town Supervisor and served from 1806 to 1809. From 1810 to 1811 he was Sheriff of Rensselaer County, New York.

Moffitt was elected as a Federalist to the Thirteenth and Fourteenth Congresses, serving from March 4, 1813, to March 3, 1817.

He was a trustee of the Stephentown Presbyterian Church, and was appointed to the board of managers of the Rensselaer County Bible Society in 1815.

He died in Stephentown on August 31, 1825 and was interred at the Old Presbyterian Cemetery on "Presbyterian Hill" in the Stephentown hamlet of Garfield.

== Sources ==
U.S. House of Representatives
Preceded by Silas Stow	Member of the U.S. House of Representatives from New York's 10th congressional district 1813–1817	Succeeded by John P. Cushman
