= Stowe =

Stowe may refer to:

== Places ==
=== United Kingdom ===
- Stowe, Buckinghamshire, a civil parish and former village
  - Stowe House
  - Stowe School
- Stowe, Cornwall, in Kilkhampton parish
- Stowe, Herefordshire, in the List of places in Herefordshire
- Stowe, Lichfield, Staffordshire
- Stowe, Lincolnshire, a hamlet in Barholm and Stowe parish
- Stowe, Shropshire, a small village and civil parish
- Stowe-by-Chartley, Staffordshire, a village and civil parish
- Stowe Pool, a reservoir in Lichfield, Staffordshire
- Stowe, a corner of the Silverstone Circuit

=== United States ===
- Stowe Township, Pennsylvania
- Stowe, Pennsylvania, a census-designated place
- Stowe, Vermont, a town
  - Stowe Mountain Resort ski area
  - Stowe Recreation Path
- Lake Stowe, a prehistoric glacial lake in what is now Vermont
- Stowe, West Virginia, an unincorporated community

=== Elsewhere ===
- Stowe, Alberta, Canada
- Stowe, Dominica

== People ==
- Barry Stowe (born 1957), American businessman
- Calvin Ellis Stowe (1802–1886), American biblical scholar, husband of Harriet Beecher Stowe
- Dorothy Stowe (1920–2010), social activist, environmentalist and a founder of Greenpeace
- Emily Stowe (1831–1903), women's rights activist and the first female doctor in Canada
- Hal Stowe (born 1937), American baseball player
- Harriet Beecher Stowe (1811–1896), American abolitionist and author
- Harry Stovey (1856–1937), American Major League Baseball player born Harry Duffield Stowe
- Irving Stowe (1915–1974), American lawyer, activist and a founder of Greenpeace; husband of Dorothy Stowe
- John Stowe (born 1966), American Catholic bishop
- Kenneth Stowe (1927–2015), British senior civil servant
- Leland Stowe (1899–1994), Pulitzer Prize-winning American journalist
- Lyman Maynard Stowe (1914–1965), American physician and academic administrator
- Madeleine Stowe (born 1958), American actress
- Marilyn Stowe (born 1957), English solicitor
- Otto Stowe (born 1949), former National Football League wide receiver
- Reid Stowe (born 1952), American artist and sailor
- Tyronne Stowe (born 1965), American retired National Football League linebacker
- William Stowe (rower) (1940–2016), American rower
- William Henry Stowe (1825–1855), British scholar and journalist
- William McFerrin Stowe (1913–1988), American bishop of the Methodist and United Methodist Churches

== Other uses ==
- Stowe Open, a defunct tennis tournament
- Stowe, Southern Railway (UK) SR V Schools class locomotive no. 928

== See also ==
- Stowe manuscripts, a collection in the British Library
  - Stowe Missal, an Irish illuminated manuscript
  - Stowe Breviary, an illuminated manuscript
- Ælfnoth of Stowe (died 700), English hermit and martyr
- Sir Thomas Temple, 1st Baronet, of Stowe (1567-c. 1637), English landowner and Member of Parliament
- Stow (disambiguation)
