= John P. Cushman =

American politician

John Paine Cushman
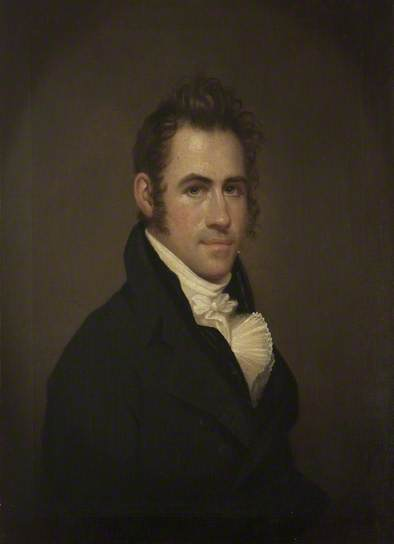

Judge of the Third Circuit Court
- In office 1838 – 1844
- Preceded by: James Vanderpoel
- Succeeded by: Amasa J. Parker

Member of the United States House of Representatives from New York's 10th District
- In office March 4, 1817 – March 3, 1819
- Preceded by: Hosea Moffitt
- Succeeded by: John D. Dickinson

Personal details
- Born: March 8, 1784 Plainfield, Windham County, Connecticut
- Died: September 16, 1848 (aged 64) Troy, Rensselaer County, New York
- Spouse: Maria Jones Tallmadge
- Relations: Benjamin Tallmadge (father-in-law); Frederick Tallmadge (brother-in-law)
- Education: Yale College; Litchfield Law School

John Paine Cushman (March 8, 1784 Plainfield, Windham County, Connecticut – September 16, 1848 Troy, Rensselaer County, New York) was an American lawyer and politician from New York.

== Early life ==
Cushman attended the common schools and Plainfield Academy, and graduated from Yale College in 1807. Then he studied law at the Litchfield Law School, was admitted to the bar in 1809, and commenced practice in Troy, New York.

== Career ==
In 1817, Cushman was elected as a Federalist to the 15th United States Congress with 54.98% of the popular vote, topping the incumbent Hosea Moffitt, a fellow Federalist. After holding office from March 4, 1817, to March 3, 1819, Cushman resumed the practice of law.

He was a regent of the University of the State of New York from April 1830 until April 1834, when he resigned. He was a trustee of Union College from 1833 until his death. He was Recorder of Troy from 1834 to 1838, and Judge of the Third Circuit from 1838 to 1844.

== Personal life ==
While in law school he met and married Maria Jones Tallmadge (1790–1878), the daughter of Benjamin Tallmadge, a Revolutionary War officer who was the leader of the Culper Ring who later became a U.S. Representative, and sister of Frederick A. Tallmadge. Together, they had:

- Julia Paine Cushman (b. 1822), who married Amos Henry Farnsworth (b. 1825) in 1850.
- Tallmadge Cushman
- Edward Cushman
- Harriet Delafield Cushman (1825-1897), who married Col. George Thatcher Balch (1828–1894).
- Mary Floyd Cushman (1827–1916), who married Edward C. Williams (1820–1913)
- John Paine Cushman, Jr. (1830–1901), was a Presbyterian minister, who married H. Caroline Maltby in 1860.

After his death on September 16, 1848, he was buried at the Oakwood Cemetery in Troy, New York.

U.S. House of Representatives
Preceded by Hosea Moffitt	Member of the U.S. House of Representatives from New York's 10th congressional district 1817–1819	Succeeded by John D. Dickinson
Legal offices
Preceded by James Vanderpoel	Judge of the Third Circuit Court; 1838–1844	Succeeded by Amasa J. Parker
