= Stowers =

Stowers is a surname. Notable people with the surname include:

- Amando Stowers (fl. 1941–1951), Western Samoan politician
- Chris Stowers (born 1974), Major League Baseball outfielder
- Craig Stowers (1954–2022), American jurist, associate justice of the Alaska Supreme Court
- Eli Stowers (born 2003), American football player
- Feagaiga Stowers (born 2000), Samoan weightlifter
- Freddie Stowers (1896–1918), United States Army corporal posthumously awarded the Medal of Honor
- George Stowers (born 1979), Samoan international rugby player
- Harry Stowers (1926–2015), American jurist
- James E. Stowers (born 1924), founder of American Century Investments and the Stowers Institute for Medical Research
- Julia Stowers (born 1982), American swimmer
- Kyle Stowers (born 1998), American baseball player
- Lisa Stowers, American neuroscientist
- Sal Stowers (born 1986), American fashion model and actress
- Shannon Stowers, New Zealand rugby league player
- Sherwin Stowers (born 1986), New Zealand rugby player
- Tim Stowers (born 1958), head coach of the Georgia Southern Eagles and Rhode Island Rams football teams
- Willie Stowers (1887–1971), Western Samoan politician

== See also ==
- Justice Stowers (disambiguation)
- Stower, a list of people with the surname
