= Stower =

Stower or Stöwer is a surname. Notable people with the surname include:

- Harvey Stower (1944–2009), American politician
- John G. Stower (1791–1851), American politician
- Willy Stöwer (1864–1931), German painter

== See also ==
- Asa Stower House, Queensbury, New York, United States, on the National Register of Historic Places
- Stowers, another surname
