= Levi Hubbell =

American lawyer, judge, and politician

Levi N. Hubbell
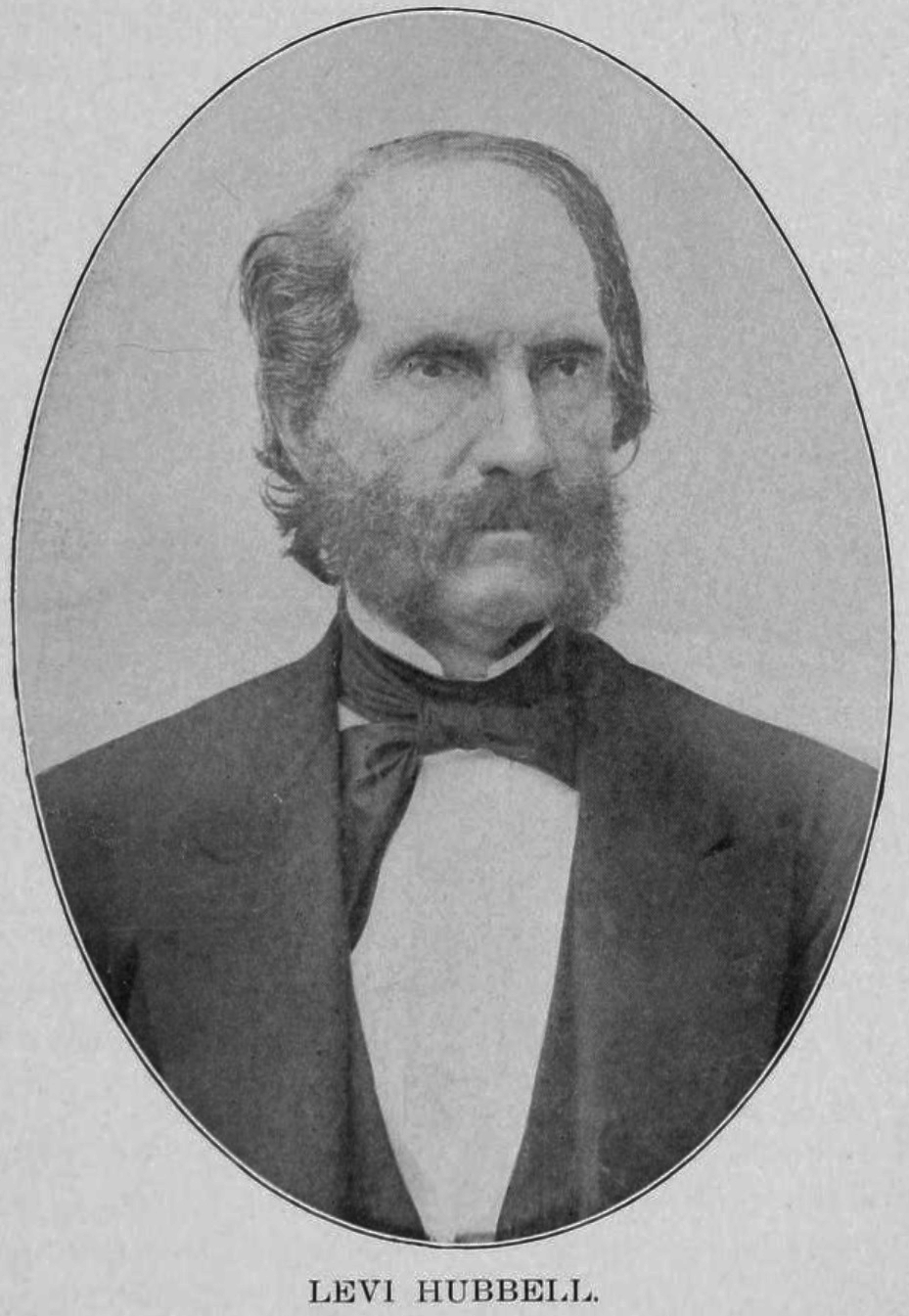

United States Attorney for the Eastern District of Wisconsin
- In office 1871 – June 1875
- Appointed by: Ulysses S. Grant
- Preceded by: John B. D. Cogswell; (District of Wisconsin)
- Succeeded by: Gerry Whiting Hazelton

2nd Chief Justice of the Wisconsin Supreme Court
- In office June 18, 1851 – January 2, 1852
- Preceded by: Alexander W. Stow
- Succeeded by: Edward V. Whiton

Justice of the Wisconsin Supreme Court
- ex officio
- In office August 28, 1848 – June 1, 1853

Wisconsin Circuit Court Judge for the 2nd Circuit
- In office August 28, 1848 – September 9, 1856
- Preceded by: Position Established
- Succeeded by: Alexander Randall

Member of the Wisconsin State Assembly from the Milwaukee 1st district
- In office January 1, 1864 – January 1, 1865
- Preceded by: John Sharpstein
- Succeeded by: Jackson Hadley

Member of the New York State Assembly from the Tompkins 1st district
- In office January 1, 1841 – January 1, 1842
- Preceded by: William Henry Bogart
- Succeeded by: Charles Humphrey

Personal details
- Born: April 15, 1808 Ballston Spa, New York, U.S.
- Died: December 8, 1876 (aged 68) Milwaukee, Wisconsin, U.S.
- Resting place: Forest Home Cemetery; Milwaukee, Wisconsin
- Party: Republican; National Union (1864); Whig (before 1855)
- Spouses: Susan Linn (DeWitt) Hubbell; (m. 1836; died 1849); Mary Morris (Beall) Hubbell; (m. 1852; died 1866)
- Children: Simeon DeWitt Hubbell^{(b. 1837; died 1915)}; Richard Walter Hubbell^{(b. 1840; died 1910)}; Singleton Beall Hubbell^{(b. 1855; died 1884)}; Mary Morris Cooper Hubbell^{(b. 1858; died 1879)}
- Parents: Abijah Hubbell (father); Clarissa (Fitch) Hubbell (mother)
- Education: Union College
- Occupation: lawyer, judge

Military service
- Service: New York Militia
- Years of service: 1833–1836
- Rank: Major General
- Commands: Adjutant General of New York

Levi Hubbell (April 15, 1808 – December 8, 1876) was an American lawyer, judge, and politician. He was the first Wisconsin state official to be impeached by the Wisconsin State Assembly in his role as Wisconsin circuit court judge for the 2nd circuit. He was also Chief Justice of the Wisconsin Supreme Court prior to the 1852 law which organized a separate Supreme Court, and he later became the first United States Attorney for the Eastern District of Wisconsin. He served one term each in the Wisconsin State Assembly and New York State Assembly.

== Biography ==
Born in Ballston, New York, Hubbell graduated from Union College in 1827 and was admitted to the New York Bar. He practiced law with his brother at Canandaigua, New York.

Hubbell served as Adjutant General of New York from 1833 to 1836; appointed by Governor William L. Marcy, he succeeded John Adams Dix and was succeeded by Thomas W. Harman. He served in the New York State Assembly in 1841 as a Whig.

In 1844, Hubbell moved to Milwaukee, Wisconsin Territory where he practiced law at Finch & Lynde. When Wisconsin was admitted to the union on May 29, 1848, he ran as an independent Democrat in the second district, which then included both Milwaukee and Dane counties and was elected as one of the Wisconsin Circuit Court judges, which at that time constituted the Wisconsin Supreme Court. Hubbell became chief justice of the supreme court after Alexander W. Stow left office. In 1853, however, when a new separate Supreme Court was being organized, Hubbell lost the nomination for a seat on the new court.

Hubbell remained a circuit court judge, but was impeached and acquitted by the Wisconsin State Legislature on charges of corruption. He soon resigned in 1856, but in 1863, he was elected to the Wisconsin State Assembly.

In 1871, he was appointed United States Attorney for the Eastern District of Wisconsin, but was forced to resign in 1875 because of accusations of corruption.

Hubbell died in Milwaukee on December 8, 1876. He was buried at Forest Home Cemetery in Milwaukee.

He was married twice. He had two sons with his first wife, Susan Linn DeWitt of Albany, and a son, Dr. Singleton Beall Hubbell, M.D., and a daughter with the second wife, Miss Beall.

== See also ==
- Impeachment in the United States
