= New York's 10th congressional district =

U.S. House district for New York

Coordinates: 40°42′07″N 74°00′26″W

- Interactive map of district boundaries since January 3, 2025
- Representative: Dan Goldman; D–Manhattan
- Area: 14.25 mi^{2} (36.9 km^{2})
- Distribution: 100% urban; 0% rural
- Population (2025): 780,274
- Median household income: $121,248
- Ethnicity: 48.7% White; 21.7% Asian; 19.1% Hispanic; 5.4% Black; 3.9% Two or more races; 1.1% other
- Cook PVI: D+32

New York's 10th congressional district is a congressional district for the United States House of Representatives currently represented by Democrat Dan Goldman. The current Representative-elect is Brad Lander. The district contains all of Lower Manhattan, including Alphabet City, Chelsea, Meatpacking District, Flatiron District, East Village, the Lower East Side, West Village, and Wall Street, and the western Brooklyn neighborhoods of Brooklyn Heights, DUMBO, Cobble Hill, Carroll Gardens, Red Hook, Gowanus, Prospect Heights, Park Slope, Windsor Terrace, and Sunset Park. The district also contains parts of Borough Park and Bay Ridge in Brooklyn, and all of Prospect Park. In Upper New York Harbor, the district includes Governors Island, Liberty Island and the Statue of Liberty, and parts of Ellis Island. It also includes the National September 11 Memorial & Museum and One World Trade Center.

== History ==
This congressional district has changed configurations and locations many times due to redistricting, initially starting out as an upstate constituency before gradually moving south. Beginning in the 1870s, it shifted into parts of New York City, where it has remained.

In the 20th century, the 10th district was a Brooklyn-based seat from 1913 until 1973, when that iteration of the district was redrawn and renumbered the 16th, and the 10th was reassigned to a district in northern Queens and the east Bronx. The 1980 redistricting cycle restored the 10th district to Brooklyn, covering largely the same terrain as before. In 1990, much of the old 10th district was added to the new Queens–Brooklyn 9th district, while the new 10th then absorbed much of the old 11th district, including its congressman, Ed Towns.

From 2003 to 2013, this district was exclusively Brooklyn-based. During this time, it was majority-African American and included the neighborhoods of Bedford-Stuyvesant, Brooklyn Heights, Brownsville, Canarsie, East New York, and Ocean Hill, as well as parts of Fort Greene, Prospect Heights, and Williamsburg. In the 2010–12 redistricting cycle, the district was reconfigured to cover most of Manhattan's West Side, covering most of what had been the 8th district.

The 2010 map had a size of 14.25 mi^{2} (36.9 km^{2}). New York's 10th district was the nation's second-smallest by area, after New York's 13th. It is New York's second-wealthiest congressional district and the 12th-wealthiest in the United States, with 32.6% of households earning over $200,000, per a 2024 study.

Demographically, it also had the most (197,000 or 270,000) and highest percentage of Jews (27.5% or 37.6%) (Note: The cited reference appears to contradict itself on the 10th district's Jewish population. The maps in the report use a population of 197,000.) of any congressional district, largely because it included several heavily Jewish neighborhoods of Manhattan and Brooklyn. Before 2020, the district stretched from the Upper West Side of Manhattan to Borough Park.

== Current composition ==
The 10th district is entirely in the New York City boroughs of Brooklyn and Manhattan.

Brooklyn neighborhoods in the district include:

- Boerum Hill
- Borough Park
- Brooklyn Heights
- Carroll Gardens
- Cobble Hill
- Downtown Brooklyn
- DUMBO
- Gowanus
- Park Slope
- Prospect Heights
- Red Hook
- South Slope
- Sunset Park
- Windsor Terrace

Manhattan neighborhoods in the district include:

- Battery Park City
- Chelsea
- Chinatown
- Civic Center
- East Village
- Financial District
- Flatiron District
- Greenwich Village
- Hudson Square
- Little Italy
- Lower East Side
- Meatpacking District
- SoHo
- Tribeca
- Two Bridges
- West Village

== List of members representing the district ==
Member	Party	Years	Cong ress	Electoral history	District location
District established March 4, 1793
Silas Talbot (New York)	Pro-Administration	March 4, 1793 – June 5, 1794	3rd	Elected in 1793. Resigned to join the U.S. Navy.	1793–1799; Western New York, approximately bounded to the east by the eastern borders of Hamilton, Fulton, Montgomery, Schoharie, and Delaware counties, and bordering (but not including) St. Lawrence County to the north
Vacant		June 5, 1794 – March 3, 1795	3rd	No special election was called by Gov. Clinton for political reasons.	1793–1799; Western New York, approximately bounded to the east by the eastern borders of Hamilton, Fulton, Montgomery, Schoharie, and Delaware counties, and bordering (but not including) St. Lawrence County to the north
William Cooper (Cooperstown)	Federalist	March 4, 1795 – March 3, 1797	4th	Elected in 1794. Lost re-election.	1793–1799; Western New York, approximately bounded to the east by the eastern borders of Hamilton, Fulton, Montgomery, Schoharie, and Delaware counties, and bordering (but not including) St. Lawrence County to the north
James Cochran (Albany)	Federalist	March 4, 1797 – March 3, 1799	5th	Elected in 1796. Retired.	1793–1799; Western New York, approximately bounded to the east by the eastern borders of Hamilton, Fulton, Montgomery, Schoharie, and Delaware counties, and bordering (but not including) St. Lawrence County to the north
William Cooper (Cooperstown)	Federalist	March 4, 1799 – March 3, 1801	6th	Elected in 1798. Retired.	1799–1803; All of New York west of and including Cayuga, Onondaga, Cortland, and Broome counties; also included portions of what are today Chenango and Otsego counties
Thomas Morris (Canadaigua)	Federalist	March 4, 1801 – March 3, 1803	7th	Elected in 1800. Retired.	1799–1803; All of New York west of and including Cayuga, Onondaga, Cortland, and Broome counties; also included portions of what are today Chenango and Otsego counties
George Tibbits (Troy)	Federalist	March 4, 1803 – March 3, 1805	8th	Elected in 1802. Retired.	1803–1809; Rensselaer County
Josiah Masters (Schaghticoke)	Democratic-Republican	March 4, 1805 – March 3, 1809	9th 10th	Elected in 1804. Re-elected in 1806. Retired.	1803–1809; Rensselaer County
John Nicholson (Herkimer)	Democratic-Republican	March 4, 1809 – March 3, 1811	11th	Elected in 1808. Retired.	1809–1813; Jefferson, Lewis, Herkimer, and St. Lawrence counties
Silas Stow (Lowville)	Democratic-Republican	March 4, 1811 – March 3, 1813	12th	Elected in 1810. Retired.	1809–1813; Jefferson, Lewis, Herkimer, and St. Lawrence counties
Hosea Moffitt (Nassau)	Federalist	March 4, 1813 – March 3, 1817	13th 14th	Elected in 1812. Re-elected in 1814. Retired.	1813–1823; Rensselaer County
John P. Cushman (Troy)	Federalist	March 4, 1817 – March 3, 1819	15th	Elected in 1816. Retired.	1813–1823; Rensselaer County
John Dean Dickinson (Troy)	Federalist	March 4, 1819 – March 3, 1823	16th 17th	Elected in 1818. Re-elected in 1821. Redistricted to the 9th district and lost re-election.	1813–1823; Rensselaer County
Stephen Van Rensselaer (Albany)	Adams–Clay Federalist	March 4, 1823 – March 3, 1825	18th 19th 20th	Redistricted from the 9th district and re-elected in 1822. Re-elected in 1824. Re-elected in 1826. Retired.	1823–1843; Albany County
Stephen Van Rensselaer (Albany)	Anti-Jacksonian	March 4, 1825 – March 3, 1829	18th 19th 20th	Redistricted from the 9th district and re-elected in 1822. Re-elected in 1824. Re-elected in 1826. Retired.	1823–1843; Albany County
Ambrose Spencer (Albany)	Anti-Jacksonian	March 4, 1829 – March 3, 1831	21st	Elected in 1828. Lost re-election.	1823–1843; Albany County
Gerrit Y. Lansing (Albany)	Jacksonian	March 4, 1831 – March 3, 1837	22nd 23rd 24th	Elected in 1830. Re-elected in 1832. Re-elected in 1834. Retired.	1823–1843; Albany County
Albert Gallup (East Berne)	Democratic	March 4, 1837 – March 3, 1839	25th	Elected in 1836. Lost re-election.	1823–1843; Albany County
Daniel D. Barnard (Albany)	Whig	March 4, 1839 – March 3, 1843	26th 27th	Elected in 1838. Re-elected in 1840. Redistricted to the 13th district.	1823–1843; Albany County
Jeremiah Russell (Saugerties)	Democratic	March 4, 1843 – March 3, 1845	28th	Elected in 1842. Lost re-election.	1843–1853; Delaware and Ulster counties
Samuel Gordon (Delhi)	Democratic	March 4, 1845 – March 3, 1847	29th	Elected in 1844. Retired.	1843–1853; Delaware and Ulster counties
Eliakim Sherrill (Shandaken)	Whig	March 4, 1847 – March 3, 1849	30th	Elected in 1846. [data missing]	1843–1853; Delaware and Ulster counties
Herman D. Gould (Delhi)	Whig	March 4, 1849 – March 3, 1851	31st	Elected in 1848. Retired.	1843–1853; Delaware and Ulster counties
Marius Schoonmaker (Kingston)	Whig	March 4, 1851 – March 3, 1853	32nd	Elected in 1850. Retired.	1843–1853; Delaware and Ulster counties
William Murray (Goshen)	Independent; Democratic	March 4, 1853 – March 3, 1855	33rd	Redistricted from the 9th district and re-elected in 1852. Retired.	1853–1863; Sullivan and Orange counties
Ambrose S. Murray (Goshen)	Opposition	March 4, 1855 – March 3, 1857	34th 35th	Elected in 1854. Re-elected in 1856. Retired.	1853–1863; Sullivan and Orange counties
Ambrose S. Murray (Goshen)	Republican	March 4, 1857 – March 3, 1859	34th 35th	Elected in 1854. Re-elected in 1856. Retired.	1853–1863; Sullivan and Orange counties
Charles Van Wyck (Bloomingburg)	Republican	March 4, 1859 – March 3, 1863	36th 37th	Elected in 1858. Re-elected in 1860. Retired to join the Union Army.	1853–1863; Sullivan and Orange counties
William Radford (Yonkers)	Democratic	March 4, 1863 – March 3, 1867	38th 39th	Elected in 1862. Re-elected in 1864. Lost re-election.	1863–1873; Westchester, Rockland, and Bronx counties
William H. Robertson (Katonah)	Republican	March 4, 1867 – March 3, 1869	40th	Elected in 1866. Retired.	1863–1873; Westchester, Rockland, and Bronx counties
Clarkson Nott Potter (New Rochelle)	Democratic	March 4, 1869 – March 3, 1873	41st 42nd	Elected in 1868. Re-elected in 1870. Redistricted to the 11th district.	1863–1873; Westchester, Rockland, and Bronx counties
Fernando Wood (New York)	Democratic	March 4, 1873 – March 3, 1875	43rd	Redistricted from the 9th district and re-elected in 1872. Redistricted back to the 9th district.	1873–1875; Northern Manhattan
Abram Stevens Hewitt (New York)	Democratic	March 4, 1875 – March 3, 1879	44th 45th	Elected in 1874. Re-elected in 1876. Retired.	1875–1913; Various parts of Midtown and Lower Manhattan
James O'Brien (New York)	Independent; Democratic	March 4, 1879 – March 3, 1881	46th	Elected in 1878. Lost renomination.	1875–1913; Various parts of Midtown and Lower Manhattan
Abram Stevens Hewitt (New York)	Democratic	March 4, 1881 – December 30, 1886	47th 48th 49th	Elected in 1880. Re-elected in 1882. Re-elected in 1884. Resigned to become Mayor of New York City.	1875–1913; Various parts of Midtown and Lower Manhattan
Vacant		December 30, 1886 – March 3, 1887	49th		1875–1913; Various parts of Midtown and Lower Manhattan
Francis B. Spinola (New York)	Democratic	March 4, 1887 – April 14, 1891	50th 51st 52nd	Elected in 1886. Re-elected in 1888. Re-elected in 1890. Died.	1875–1913; Various parts of Midtown and Lower Manhattan
Vacant		April 14, 1891 – November 3, 1891	52nd		1875–1913; Various parts of Midtown and Lower Manhattan
William Bourke Cockran (New York)	Democratic	November 3, 1891 – March 3, 1893	52nd	Elected to finish Spinola's term. Redistricted to the 12th district.	1875–1913; Various parts of Midtown and Lower Manhattan
Daniel Sickles (New York)	Democratic	March 4, 1893 – March 3, 1895	53rd	Elected in 1892. Lost re-election.	1875–1913; Various parts of Midtown and Lower Manhattan
Vacant		March 4, 1895 – November 5, 1895	54th	Representative-elect Andrew J. Campbell died before term began.	1875–1913; Various parts of Midtown and Lower Manhattan
Amos J. Cummings (New York)	Democratic	November 5, 1895 – May 2, 1902	54th 55th 56th 57th	Elected to finish Campbell's term. Re-elected in 1896. Re-elected in 1898. Re-elected in 1900. Died.	1875–1913; Various parts of Midtown and Lower Manhattan
Vacant		May 2, 1902 – November 4, 1902	57th		1875–1913; Various parts of Midtown and Lower Manhattan
Edward Swann (New York)	Democratic	November 4, 1902 – March 3, 1903	57th	Elected to finish Cummings's term. Retired.	1875–1913; Various parts of Midtown and Lower Manhattan
William Sulzer (New York)	Democratic	March 4, 1903 – December 31, 1912	58th 59th 60th 61st 62nd	Redistricted from the 11th district and re-elected in 1902. Re-elected in 1904. Re-elected in 1906. Re-elected in 1908. Re-elected in 1910. Resigned to become Governor of New York.	1875–1913; Various parts of Midtown and Lower Manhattan
Vacant		January 1, 1913 – March 3, 1913	62nd		1875–1913; Various parts of Midtown and Lower Manhattan
Herman A. Metz (Brooklyn)	Democratic	March 4, 1913 – March 3, 1915	63rd	Elected in 1912. Retired.	1913–1963; Various parts of Brooklyn
Reuben L. Haskell (Brooklyn)	Republican	March 4, 1915 – December 31, 1919	64th 65th 66th	Elected in 1914. Re-elected in 1916. Re-elected in 1918. Resigned.	1913–1963; Various parts of Brooklyn
Vacant		December 31, 1919 – November 2, 1920	66th		1913–1963; Various parts of Brooklyn
Lester D. Volk (Brooklyn)	Republican	November 2, 1920 – March 3, 1923	66th 67th	Elected to finish Haskell's term. Re-elected in 1920. Lost re-election.	1913–1963; Various parts of Brooklyn
Emanuel Celler (Brooklyn)	Democratic	March 4, 1923 – January 3, 1945	68th 69th 70th 71st 72nd 73rd 74th 75th 76th 77th 78th	Elected in 1922. Re-elected in 1924. Re-elected in 1926. Re-elected in 1928. Re-elected in 1930. Re-elected in 1932. Re-elected in 1934. Re-elected in 1936. Re-elected in 1938. Re-elected in 1940. Re-elected in 1942. Redistricted to the 15th district.	1913–1963; Various parts of Brooklyn
Andrew L. Somers (Brooklyn)	Democratic	January 3, 1945 – April 6, 1949	79th 80th 81st	Redistricted from the 6th district and re-elected in 1944. Re-elected in 1946. Re-elected in 1948. Died.	1913–1963; Various parts of Brooklyn
Vacant		April 7, 1949 – November 7, 1949	81st		1913–1963; Various parts of Brooklyn
Edna F. Kelly (Brooklyn)	Democratic	November 8, 1949 – January 3, 1963	81st 82nd 83rd 84th 85th 86th 87th	Elected to finish Somers's term Re-elected in 1950. Re-elected in 1952. Re-elected in 1954. Re-elected in 1956. Re-elected in 1958. Re-elected in 1960. Redistricted to the 12th district.	1913–1963; Various parts of Brooklyn
Emanuel Celler (Brooklyn)	Democratic	January 3, 1963 – January 3, 1971	88th 89th 90th 91st 92nd	Redistricted from the 11th district and re-elected in 1962. Re-elected in 1964. Re-elected in 1966. Re-elected in 1968. Re-elected in 1970. Redistricted to the 16th district and lost renomination.	1963–1971; Parts of Brooklyn and Queens
Emanuel Celler (Brooklyn)	Democratic	January 3, 1971 – January 3, 1973	88th 89th 90th 91st 92nd	Redistricted from the 11th district and re-elected in 1962. Re-elected in 1964. Re-elected in 1966. Re-elected in 1968. Re-elected in 1970. Redistricted to the 16th district and lost renomination.	1971–1973; Parts of Brooklyn
Mario Biaggi (The Bronx)	Democratic	January 3, 1973 – January 3, 1983	93rd 94th 95th 96th 97th	Redistricted from the 24th district and re-elected in 1972. Re-elected in 1974. Re-elected in 1976. Re-elected in 1978. Re-elected in 1980. Redistricted to the 19th district.	1973–1983; Parts of Queens and the Bronx
Chuck Schumer (Brooklyn)	Democratic	January 3, 1983 – January 3, 1993	98th 99th 100th 101st 102nd	Redistricted from the 16th district and re-elected in 1982. Re-elected in 1984. Re-elected in 1986. Re-elected in 1988. Re-elected in 1990. Redistricted to the 9th district.	1983–2003; Parts of Brooklyn
Ed Towns (Brooklyn)	Democratic	January 3, 1993 – January 3, 2013	103rd 104th 105th 106th 107th 108th 109th 110th 111th 112th	Redistricted from the 11th district and re-elected in 1992. Re-elected in 1994. Re-elected in 1996. Re-elected in 1998. Re-elected in 2000. Re-elected in 2002. Re-elected in 2004. Re-elected in 2006. Re-elected in 2008. Re-elected in 2010. Retired.	1983–2003; Parts of Brooklyn
Ed Towns (Brooklyn)	Democratic	January 3, 1993 – January 3, 2013	103rd 104th 105th 106th 107th 108th 109th 110th 111th 112th	Redistricted from the 11th district and re-elected in 1992. Re-elected in 1994. Re-elected in 1996. Re-elected in 1998. Re-elected in 2000. Re-elected in 2002. Re-elected in 2004. Re-elected in 2006. Re-elected in 2008. Re-elected in 2010. Retired.	2003–2013; Parts of Brooklyn
Jerry Nadler (New York)	Democratic	January 3, 2013 – January 3, 2023	113th 114th 115th 116th 117th	Redistricted from the 8th district and re-elected in 2012. Re-elected in 2014. Re-elected in 2016. Re-elected in 2018. Re-elected in 2020. Redistricted to the 12th district.	2013–2023; Parts of Manhattan and Brooklyn
Dan Goldman (New York)	Democratic	January 3, 2023 – present	118th 119th	Elected in 2022. Re-elected in 2024. Lost renomination.	2023–2025; Parts of Manhattan and Brooklyn
Dan Goldman (New York)	Democratic	January 3, 2023 – present	118th 119th	Elected in 2022. Re-elected in 2024. Lost renomination.	2025–present Parts of Manhattan and Brooklyn
Brad Lander (Brooklyn)	Democratic	Assuming office on January 3, 2027		Elected in 2026.	2025–present Parts of Manhattan and Brooklyn

== Recent election results from statewide races ==
Year	Office	Results
2008	President	Obama 84% - 15%
2012	President	Obama 85% - 15%
2016	President	Clinton 85% - 11%
2016	Senate	Schumer 86% - 10%
2018	Senate	Gillibrand 90% - 10%
2018	Governor	Cuomo 84% - 10%
2018	Attorney General	James 87% - 10%
2020	President	Biden 85% - 14%
2022	Senate	Schumer 84% - 15%
2022	Governor	Hochul 80% - 19%
2022	Attorney General	James 82% - 18%
2022	Comptroller	DiNapoli 83% - 17%
2024	President	Harris 79% - 19%
2024	Senate	Gillibrand 82% - 17%

== Electoral history ==
=== District election results ===
The following are historical results for the 10th district's congressional elections. (Note: In New York State, there are numerous minor parties at various points on the political spectrum. Certain parties will invariably endorse either the Republican or Democratic candidate for an office; hence, where applicable, the state electoral results below contain both the individual party votes and the final candidate votes (listed as "Total").)

U.S. House election, 1870: New York's 10th congressional district
Party	Candidate	Votes	%	±%
Democratic	Clarkson Nott Potter (incumbent)	14,249	57.1	
Republican	James Westervelt	10,685	42.9	
Majority		3,564	14.2	
Turnout		24,934	100	

U.S. House election, 1996: New York's 10th congressional district
Party	Candidate	Votes	%	±%
Democratic	Edolphus Towns (incumbent)	99,889	91.3	
Republican	Amelia Smith-Parker	8,660	7.9	
Right to Life	Julian M. Hill, Jr.	893	0.8	
Majority		91,229	83.4	
Turnout		109,442	100	

U.S. House election, 1998: New York's 10th congressional district
Party	Candidate	Votes	%	±%
Democratic	Edolphus Towns (incumbent)	83,528	92.3	▲1.0
Republican	Ernestine M. Brown	5,577	6.2	▼1.7
Conservative	Ernest Johnson	1,396	1.5	▲1.5
Majority		77,951	86.1	▲2.7
Turnout		90,501	100	▼17.3

U.S. House election, 2000: New York's 10th congressional district
Party	Candidate	Votes	%	±%
Democratic	Edolphus Towns (incumbent)	120,700	90.2	▼2.1
Republican	Ernestine M. Brown	6,852	5.1	▼1.1
Working Families	Barry Ford	5,530	4.1	▲4.1
Conservative	Ernest Johnson	802	0.6	▼0.9
Majority		113,848	85.0	▼1.1
Turnout		133,884	100	▲47.9

U.S. House election, 2002: New York's 10th congressional district
Party	Candidate	Votes	%	±%
Democratic	Edolphus Towns (incumbent)	73,859	97.8	▲7.6
Conservative	Herbert F. Rayn	1,639	2.2	▲1.6
Majority		72,220	95.7	▲10.7
Turnout		75,498	100	▼43.6

U.S. House election, 2004: New York's 10th congressional district
Party	Candidate	Votes	%	±%
Democratic	Edolphus Towns (incumbent)	136,113	91.5	▼6.3
Republican	Harvey R. Clarke	11,099	7.5	▲7.5
Conservative	Mariana Blume	1,554	1.0	▼1.2
Majority		125,014	84.0	▼11.7
Turnout		148,766	100	▲97.0

U.S. House election, 2006: New York's 10th congressional district
Party	Candidate	Votes	%	±%
Democratic	Edolphus Towns (incumbent)	72,171	92.2	▲0.7
Republican	Jonathan H. Anderson	4,666	6.0	▼1.5
Conservative	Ernest Johnson	1,470	1.9	▲0.9
Majority		67,505	86.2	▲2.2
Turnout		78,307	100	▼47.4

U.S. House election, 2008: New York's 10th congressional district
Party	Candidate	Votes	%	±%
Democratic	Edolphus Towns (incumbent)	72,171	92.2	▲0.7
Republican	Jonathan H. Anderson	4,666	6.0	▼1.5
Conservative	Ernest Johnson	1,470	1.9	▲0.9
Majority		67,505	86.2	▲2.2
Turnout		78,307	100	▼47.4

U.S. House election, 2014: New York's 10th congressional district
Party	Candidate	Votes	%	±%
Democratic	Jerry Nadler (incumbent)	89,080	87.6	n/a
Conservative	Ross Brady	12,042	11.8	n/a
Flourish Every Person	Michael Dilger	554	0.6	n/a
Majority		89,080	75.8	n/a
Turnout		113,226	20.1	n/a

Democratic Primary, 2016: New York District 10
Party	Candidate	Votes	%	±%
Democratic	Jerry Nadler (incumbent)	25,527	89.6	n/a
Democratic	Oliver Rosenberg	2,949	10.4	n/a
Majority		22,578	79.3	n/a
Turnout		28,476	5.1	n/a

U.S. House election, 2016: New York's 10th congressional district
Party	Candidate	Votes	%	±%
Democratic	Jerry Nadler (incumbent)	170,286	77.5	n/a
Republican	Philip Rosenthal	49,530	22.5	n/a
Majority		120,756	55	n/a
Turnout		219,816	39.4	n/a

U.S. House election, 2018: New York's 10th congressional district
Party	Candidate	Votes	%	±%
Democratic	Jerry Nadler (incumbent)	173,095	82.1	n/a
Republican	Naomi Levin	33,692	16.0	n/a
Majority		173,095	82	n/a
Turnout		210,714	100	n/a

Democratic Primary, 2020: New York District 10
Party	Candidate	Votes	%	±%
Democratic	Jerry Nadler (incumbent)	51,054	64.2	n/a
Democratic	Lindsey Boylan	16,511	20.8	n/a
Democratic	Jonathan Herzog	7,829	9.9	n/a
Majority		34,543	43.4	n/a
Turnout		79,483	30.0	n/a

U.S. House election, 2020: New York's 10th congressional district
Party	Candidate	Votes	%
Democratic	Jerry Nadler	181,215	65.5
Working Families	Jerry Nadler	25,095	9.1
Total	Jerry Nadler (incumbent)	206,310	74.6
Republican	Cathy Bernstein	61,045	22.1
Conservative	Cathy Bernstein	5,844	2.1
Total	Cathy Bernstein	66,889	24.2
Libertarian	Michael Madrid	3,370	1.2
Total votes		276,569	100.0
Democratic hold			

Democratic Primary, 2022: New York District 10
Party	Candidate	Votes	%
Democratic	Dan Goldman	16,686	25.8
Democratic	Yuh-Line Niou	15,380	23.7
Democratic	Mondaire Jones (Note: Due to redistricting, Mondaire Jones decided to move to NY-10, which is not connected by territory to his home district of NY-17.)	11,777	18.2
Democratic	Carlina Rivera	10,985	17.0
Democratic	Jo Anne Simon	3,991	6.2
Democratic	Elizabeth Holtzman	2,845	4.4
Democratic	Jimmy Li	777	1.2
Democratic	Yan Xiong	686	1.1
Democratic	Maud Maron	578	0.9
Democratic	Bill de Blasio (withdrawn)	477	0.7
Democratic	Brian Robinson	322	0.5
Democratic	Peter Gleason	147	0.2
Democratic	Quanda Francis	121	0.2
Total votes		64,772	100.0

U.S. House election, 2022: New York's 10th congressional district
Party	Candidate	Votes	%
Democratic	Daniel Goldman	160,582	83.49%
Republican	Benine Hamdan	26,711	13.89%
Conservative	Benine Hamdan	2,347	1.22%
Total	Benine Hamdan	29,058	15.11%
Medical Freedom Party	Steve Speer	1,447	0.75%
Write-in		1,260	0.66%
Total votes		192,347	100%

U.S. House election, 2024: New York's 10th congressional district
Party	Candidate	Votes	%
Democratic	Daniel Goldman	186,991	82.1%
Republican	Alexander Dodenhoff	34,577	15.2%
Conservative	Paul Briscoe	6,173	2.7%
Total votes		227,741	100%

U.S. House election, 2026: New York's 10th congressional district
Party	Candidate	Votes	%
Democratic	Bradford Lander	167,343	83.2%
Republican	Jennifer E Moore	31,912	15.9%
Write-In	Write-In	1,865	0.9%
Total votes		201,120	100%

== See also ==
- List of United States congressional districts
- New York's congressional delegations
- New York's congressional districts
