= William Wetmore =

- Born: September 16, 1771; Middletown, Connecticut
- Died: October 27, 1827 (aged 56); Ohio

William Wetmore (September 16, 1771 – October 27, 1827) founded Cuyahoga Falls, Ohio in 1812.

== Early life ==
Wetmore was born in Middletown, Connecticut and was hired by Joshua Stow as a land agent of property in the Western Reserve which was purchased by the Connecticut Land Company. Wetmore moved to Ohio in 1804 and became one of the original proprietors of Cuyahoga Falls.

== Career ==
He built the second house in what became Stow Township. Wetmore was elected Justice of the Peace of Stow, as well as Clerk of the Court of Ravenna, Ohio.

During the War of 1812, William Wetmore was appointed commander for troops stationed at Old Portage. (This was the northern Portage Path, at the Cuyahoga River.) Acting as an agent for Joshua Stow, owner of the township, William also gave permission to Francis Kelsey and Isaac Wilcox to build a dam across the Cuyahoga River and to erect a sawmill. It is said lumber from this mill was used by the army to build ships at Portage for use against the British. (The dam washed away long after this.)

Wetmore and Joshua Stow owned 210 acres (0.85 km^{2}), the southern border being Portage Trail, and began developing Cuyahoga Falls in 1825. Wetmore's sons, William Jr. and Henry, supervised 30 men who constructed a dam, gristmill, sawmill, paper and linseed oil mills.

On the occasion of Edwin Wetmore's 21st birthday (1823), parents William and Anne gave him a 95-acre (380,000 m^{2}) plot of land in the Village of Silver Lake, along an upscale suburban street, Kent Road, then it was the farm that helped sustain his family and in 1820, Edwin had already built a 2-story Connecticut style farmhouse on this property. The house, with modifications, stands on 1-acre (4,000 m^{2}) and is occupied today.

William Wetmore built his home at the corner of Front Street and Portage Trail. A short time later it became a hotel known as the "Perry House" and "Clifford Inn."

In 1830, St. John's Episcopal Church was organized by William Wetmore. They met in a schoolhouse at Front and Wadsworth Streets. Shortly thereafter, construction was started at its present site on Portage Trail and Second Street.

In the twentieth century, the Wetmore farm was subdivided into a neighborhood known as Paradise Park. This tree-lined neighborhood stretches from the Wetmore house present site of the Stow-Munroe Falls Public Library, and runs several blocks. Today, Wetmore Park and Wetmore Street (located by Holy Family Church) serve as reminders of Stow's first settle family.

== Personal life ==
Wetmore died on October 27, 1827, aged 56, in Ohio and is interred in Stow Cemetery.

=== Legacy ===
The William Wetmore house was located on Darrow and Kent Road, lots 25,35, 36. Edwin Wetmore's home is located on Kent Rd and still occupied today.
