= John Nicholson (New York politician) =

American politician

John Nicholson (1765 – January 20, 1820) was a United States representative from New York. Born in Herkimer, he received a limited education, studied law, and was admitted to the bar and practiced. He held various local offices and was elected as a Democratic-Republican to the Eleventh Congress, holding office from March 4, 1809 – March 3, 1811. In 1820 he died in Herkimer.

U.S. House of Representatives
Preceded by Josiah Masters	Member of the U.S. House of Representatives from New York's 10th congressional district 1809–1811	Succeeded by Silas Stow
