= George D. Lamont =

American lawyer and politician

Member of the New York State Senate from the 29th district
- In office March 21, 1859 – December 31, 1859
- Preceded by: Horatio J. Stow
- Succeeded by: Peter P. Murphy

Personal details
- Born: January 24, 1819 Yates, New York, U.S.
- Died: January 15, 1876 (aged 56) Lockport, New York, U.S.
- Spouse: Mary Cole (after 1841)
- Education: Yale University

George Darwin Lamont (January 24, 1819 – January 15, 1876) was an American lawyer and politician from New York.

== Early life ==
He attended Yale College for a year and a half, then studied law in Lockport, received a degree from Yale in 1841, was admitted to the bar the same year, and commenced practice in Lockport.

== Career ==
He was District Attorney of Niagara County from 1851 to 1853.

He was a member of the New York State Senate (29th D.) in 1859, elected to fill the vacancy caused by the death of Horatio J. Stow. He was seated on March 21, and attended the remainder of the session until April 19.

In December 1862, he was appointed by Judge Charles A. Peabody as Prosecuting Attorney at the U.S. Provisional Court for the State of Louisiana, and remained in office until the court was discontinued in April 1865. Afterwards he resumed the practice of law in Lockport. He was Judge of the Niagara County Court from 1866 to November 1868 when he was appointed to the New York Supreme Court to fill a vacancy. In November 1871, he was elected to a full term on the Supreme Court (8th D.), and died in office.

== Personal life ==
In 1841, he married Mary Cole, and they had three children.

Lamont died on January 15, 1876, in Lockport.

== Sources ==
New York State Senate
Preceded by Horatio J. Stow	New York State Senate; 29th District; 1859	Succeeded by Peter P. Murphy
