= Justice Stowers =

Justice Stowers may refer to:

- Craig Stowers (1954–2022), chief justice of the Alaska Supreme Court
- Harry Stowers (1926–2015), chief justice of the New Mexico Supreme Court
