= Jennifer Stow =

Australian cell biologist

Jennifer Lea Stow
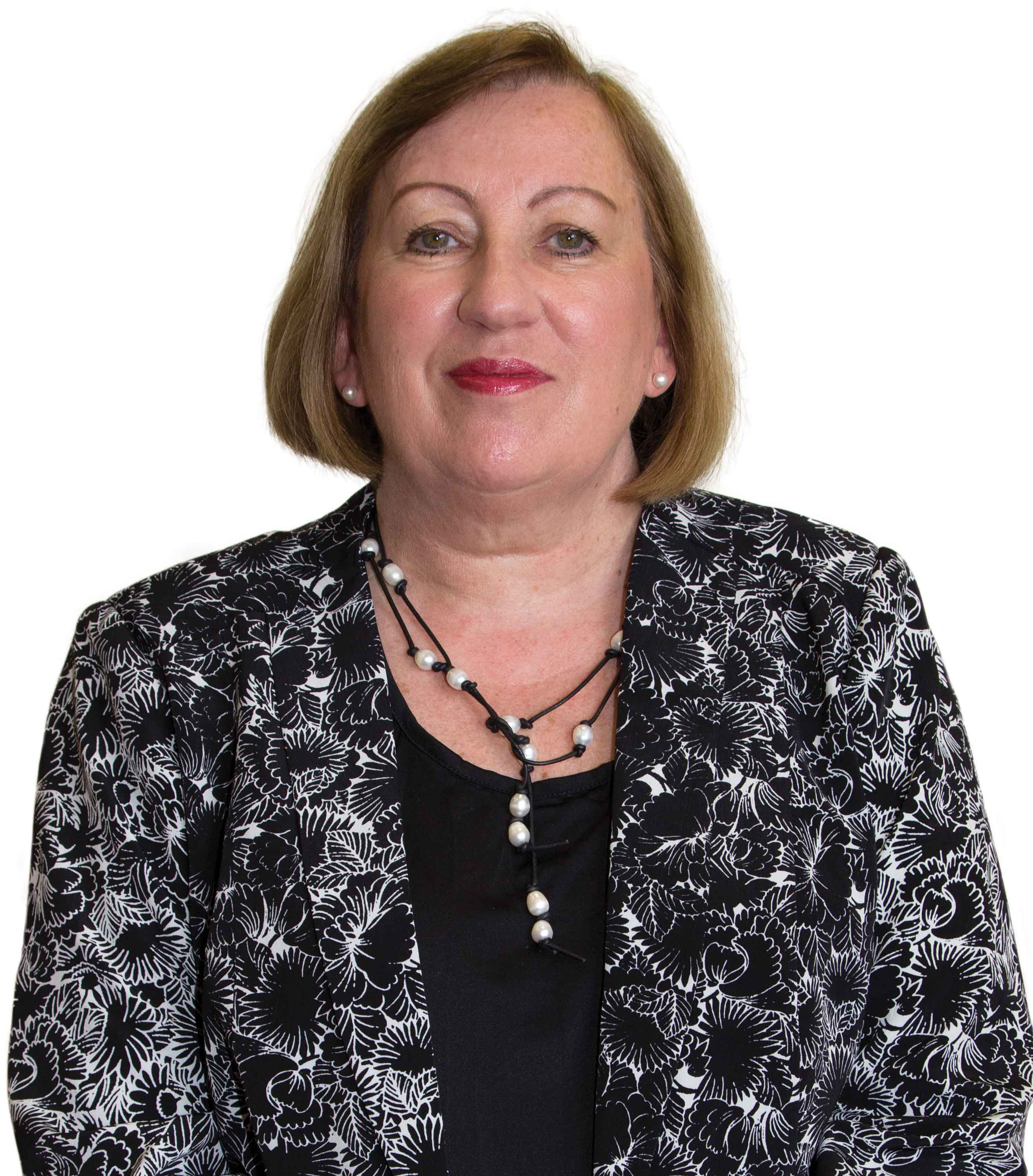
- Stow in 2014
- Education: Monash University B.Sc. Ph.D. (1982)
- Known for: Protein trafficking and inflammation
- Awards: Fogarty International Fellowship, Yale University (1982–1985); Wellcome Trust Senior Research Fellowship in Medical Sciences (1994–1999); NHMRC Principal Research Fellow; State Winner, Smart Women/Smart State Award, Queensland (2007)
- Scientific career
- Fields: Cell biology
- Workplaces: The University of Queensland; Harvard University; Yale University
- Thesis: Experimental studies on glomerular cells and basement membrane in culture (1982)
- Doctoral advisor: Eric Glasgow, Robert Atkins

Jennifer Lea Stow is an Australian cell biologist. She is a deputy director (research), NHMRC Principal Research Fellow and head of the Protein Trafficking and Inflammation laboratory at the Institute for Molecular Bioscience (IMB), The University of Queensland, Australia. She received a PhD from Monash University in Melbourne in 1982, postdoctoral training at Yale University School of Medicine (US) in the Department of Cell Biology. Her first faculty position was as an assistant professor at Harvard University in the Renal Unit, Departments of Medicine and Pathology at the Massachusetts General Hospital in Boston.

== Biography ==
Stow completed her tertiary education at Monash University Melbourne. Her undergraduate science degree was followed by an honours year (Hons 1st class) in the Department of Immunology and Pathology and a PhD (1979–1982) in the Department of Anatomy and Prince Henry's Hospital, under the supervision of Professors Eric Glasgow and Robert Atkins. Stow's PhD project involved characterizing cell populations in glomerulonephritis, and included the use of electron microscopy.

She was then awarded a Fogarty International Fellowship for postdoctoral training in the Department of Cell Biology at Yale University School of Medicine, US, where she worked with one of the luminaries of cell biology and nephrology, Dr Marilyn Farquhar. Stow, Farquhar and colleagues published seminal studies on glomerular basement membranes and proteoglycans.

Upon leaving Yale, Stow took up her first faculty position as an assistant professor in the Renal Unit at Massachusetts General Hospital at Harvard University. Stow and her colleagues published important findings on secretion in polarized epithelial cells and published the first evidence showing trimeric G proteins functioning in membrane trafficking.

At the end of 1994, Stow returned to Australia as a Wellcome Trust Senior Medical Research Fellow to set up a cell biology laboratory at the University of Queensland in Brisbane. The Centre she joined later became of Australia's largest research institutes, UQ's Institute for Molecular Bioscience, where she has served as a group leader, professor and principal research fellow of the NHMRC.

Appointed head of IMB's Division of Molecular Cell Biology and then subsequently as deputy director (research) at IMB, Stow has performed roles in science, teaching and training and research policy. Her focus has been in cell biology, where her interest in protein trafficking and secretion is pursued using techniques such as microscopy and fluorescence imaging. Her current work in inflammation and cancer focuses on trafficking in epithelial cells and on cytokine secretion in macrophages. She is known for discovering new pathways for secretion and recycling in cells and for defining new functions for the cell machinery, including large and small G proteins, myosins and SNAREs.

Stow sits on national and international peer review and scientific committees and advisory boards. She has served as head of IMB's Division of Molecular Cell Biology, and in 2008 she was appointed as deputy director (research).

== Career history ==
From 2008 to the present, Stow has held the position of National Health and Medical Research Council (NHMRC) Principal Research Fellow and Professorial Research Fellow at The University of Queensland. Additionally, Stow currently serves as the Deputy Director (Research) and Group Leader at the Institute for Molecular Bioscience, holding a joint appointment with the School of Biomedical Science at The University of Queensland, a role that was renewed in 2012.

Prior to this, during the years 2006 to 2008, Stow assumed the role of Division Head and Professor in the Division of Molecular Cell Biology at the Institute for Molecular Bioscience, also at The University of Queensland. Stow's academic journey at the university includes a period spanning from 2001 to 2006 when she held the position of NHMRC Principal Research Fellow (continuing), Associate Professor, and Group Leader within the Institute for Molecular Bioscience and the Faculty of Biological and Chemical Sciences.

In the year 2000, Stow undertook the responsibilities of Principal Research Fellow (continuing), Associate Professor, and Group Leader at the Centre for Molecular and Cellular Biology (now the IMB) and the Department of Biochemistry at The University of Queensland, Brisbane, Australia.

During the years 1994 to 1999, Stow held the position of a Wellcome Trust Senior Research Fellow (fixed term), serving as an Associate Professor and Group Leader at the Centre for Molecular and Cellular Biology (now the IMB) and the Department of Biochemistry at The University of Queensland in Brisbane, Australia.

Prior to that, Stow served as a Research Scientist and Swebelius Cancer Research Fellow at the Department of Cell Biology, Yale University School of Medicine in Connecticut, US, from 1985 to 1988. Stow's academic journey commenced as a Fogarty International Research Postdoctoral Fellow at the same institution from 1982 to 1985, under the mentorship of Professor Marilyn G. Farquhar.

== Career discoveries and awards ==
- 1987 Discovered mechanism for pH dependent sorting in epithelial cells
- 1988 Appointment at Harvard University/Massachusetts General Hospital as Assistant Professor
- 1990 Discovered new role for heterotrimeric G proteins in trafficking
- 1999 Discovered new recycling pathway for E-cadherin trafficking and regulation
- 2005 Discovered new pathway for cytokine secretion in macrophages
- 2007 State Winner, Smart Women/Smart State Award, Queensland Australia
- 2009 Davson Distinguished Lecturer for the American Physiological Society
- 2010 Discovered role for PI3K in cell secretion and inflammation
- 2014 Discovered role for PI3K and Rab8 in regulating inflammation
- 2019 Elected to EMBO

== Selected publications ==
- Condon, N.D.; Wall, A.A.; Yeo, J.C.; Hamilton, N.A.; Stow, J.L. (2017), "Image-Based Analysis of Phagocytosis: Measuring Engulfment and Internalization", in Botelho, Roberto (ed.), Phagocytosis and Phagosomes, Methods in Molecular Biology, vol. 1519, Springer New York, pp. 201–214, doi:10.1007/978-1-4939-6581-6_13, ISBN 978-1-4939-6579-3, PMID 27815881
- Yeo, J.C.; Wall, A.A.; Luo, L.; Condon, N.D.; Stow, J.L. (2016). "Distinct Roles for APPL1 and APPL2 in Regulating Toll-like Receptor 4 Signaling in Macrophages: APPL Regulation of TLR4 Signaling". Traffic. 17 (9): 1014–1026. doi:10.1111/tra.12415. PMID 27219021.
- Tuong, Z.K.; Lau, P.; Du, X.; Condon, N.D.; Goode, J.M.; Oh, T.G.; Yeo, J.C.; Muscat, G.E.O.; Stow, J.L. (2016). Bozza, P.T. (ed.). "RORα and 25-Hydroxycholesterol Crosstalk Regulates Lipid Droplet Homeostasis in Macrophages". PLOS ONE. 11 (1) e0147179. Bibcode:2016PLoSO..1147179T. doi:10.1371/journal.pone.0147179. ISSN 1932-6203. PMC 4727927. PMID 26812621.
- Luo, L.; Xue, J.; Kwan, A.; Gamsjaeger, R.; Wielens, J.; von Kleist, L.; Cubeddu, L.; Guo, Z.; Stow, J.L. (2016). "The Binding of Syndapin SH3 Domain to Dynamin Proline-rich Domain Involves Short and Long Distance Elements". Journal of Biological Chemistry. 291 (18): 9411–9424. doi:10.1074/jbc.M115.703108. ISSN 0021-9258. PMC 4850282. PMID 26893375.
- Chen, K.W.; Bezbradica, J.S.; Groß, C.J.; Wall, A.A.; Sweet, M.J.; Stow, J.L.; Schroder, K. (2016). "The murine neutrophil NLRP3 inflammasome is activated by soluble but not particulate or crystalline agonists". European Journal of Immunology. 46 (4): 1004–1010. doi:10.1002/eji.201545943. PMID 27062120.
