= Silas Stow =

American politician and judge (1773–1827)

First Judge of Lewis County, New York
- In office June 27, 1815 – January 24, 1823
- Preceded by: Jonathan Collins
- Succeeded by: Edward Bancroft

Member of the U.S. House of Representatives from New York's 10th district
- In office March 4, 1811 – March 4, 1813
- Preceded by: John Nicholson
- Succeeded by: Hosea Moffitt

Sheriff of Lewis County, New York
- In office March 2, 1814 – March 15, 1815
- Preceded by: Chillus Doty
- Succeeded by: Levi Adams

Personal details
- Born: December 21, 1773 Middlefield, Connecticut Colony, British America
- Died: January 19, 1827 (aged 53) Lowville, New York, U.S.
- Resting place: East Road Cemetery; Lowville, New York
- Party: Democratic-Republican
- Spouse: Mary Ruggles (m. 1801)
- Children: Alexander W. Stow; (b. 1805; died 1854); Marcellus K. Stow; (unknown); Horatio J. Stow; (b. 1809; died 1859)
- Parents: Elihu Stow (father); Jemima (Paine) Stow (mother)
- Relatives: Joshua Stow (brother)
- Occupation: politician, judge

Silas Stow (December 21, 1773 – January 19, 1827) was an American lawyer, politician, and judge. He served in the United States House of Representatives during the 12th United States Congress (1811–1813), representing New York's 10th congressional district.

== Biography ==
Born in Middlefield in the Connecticut Colony, he attended the common schools and studied law, but never practiced. He moved to Lowville, Lewis County, New York and engaged in agricultural pursuits. He became land agent for Nicholas Low and moved to Oneida County in 1797. He was appointed judge of Oneida County on January 28, 1801. He returned to Lewis County and was elected as a Democratic-Republican to the 12th United States Congress, holding office from March 4, 1811 to March 3, 1813. He was Sheriff of Lewis County, New York from 1814 to 1815. He was First Judge of Lewis County, New York, from 1815 to 1823. Stow died in Lowville in 1827; interment was in East State Street Burying Ground.

== Personal life and family ==
Stow was the youngest of eight children born to Elihu Stow and Jemima Paine Stow. His older brothers, Elihu, Obed, and Joshua served in the American Revolutionary War, and his father was zealous patriot who supplied materiel to the Continental Army.

Stow married Mary Ruggles on July 26, 1801. Ruggles was the sister of General George D. Ruggles. They had three children together:

- Alexander W. Stow was the 1st Chief Justice of the Wisconsin Supreme Court.
- Marcellus K. Stow was a merchant in Fond du Lac, Wisconsin.
- Horatio J. Stow was a New York State Senator.

U.S. House of Representatives
Preceded by John Nicholson	Member of the U.S. House of Representatives from New York's 10th congressional district March 4, 1811 – March 4, 1813	Succeeded by Hosea Moffitt
Legal offices
Preceded by Chillus Doty	Sheriff of Lewis County, New York; March 2, 1814 – March 15, 1815	Succeeded by Levi Adams
Preceded by Jonathan Collins	First Judge of Lewis County, New York; June 27, 1815 – January 24, 1823	Succeeded by Edward Bancroft
