= Alexander W. Stow =

American lawyer and judge (1805–1854)

The Honorable Alexander W. Stow
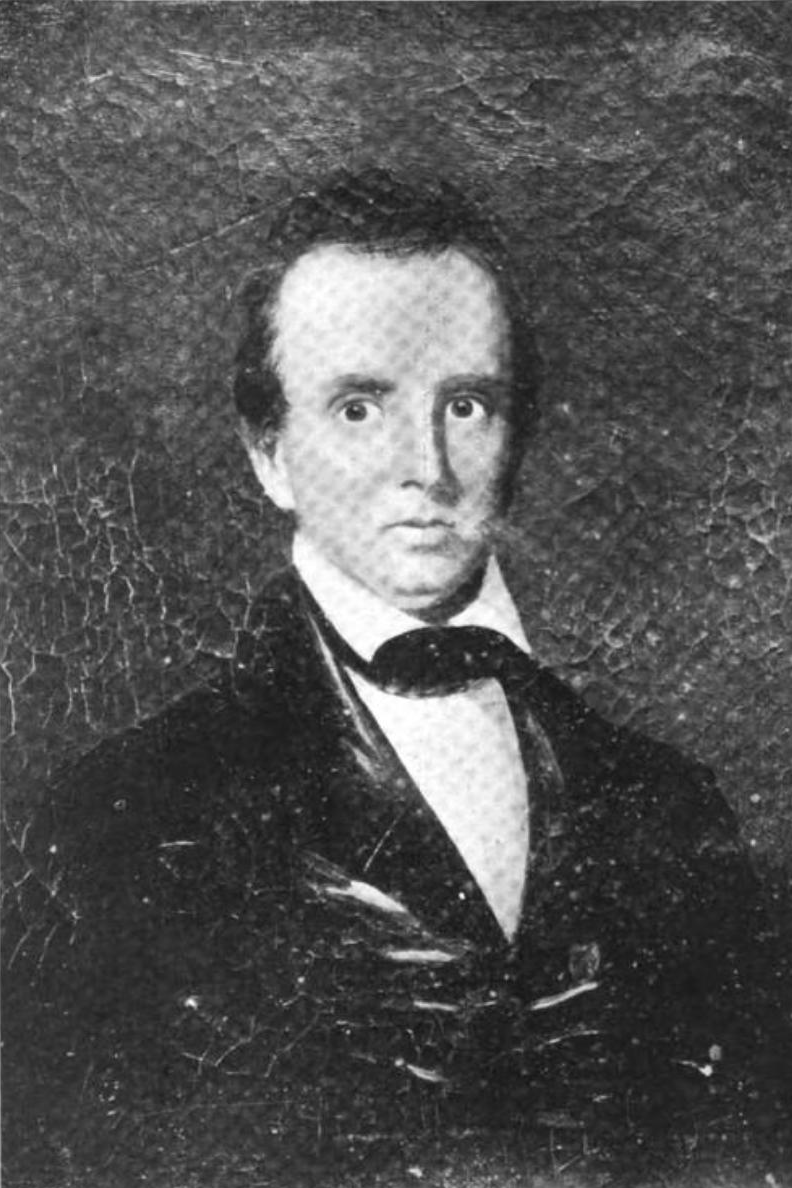
- Portrait from Report of the Proceedings of the Meetings of the State Bar Association of Wisconsin Vol. 1

1st Chief Justice of the Wisconsin Supreme Court
- In office September 1848 – January 1, 1851
- Preceded by: Position Established
- Succeeded by: Levi Hubbell

Justice of the Wisconsin Supreme Court
- ex officio
- In office September 1848 – January 1, 1851

Wisconsin Circuit Court Judge for the 4th Circuit
- In office September 1848 – January 1, 1851
- Preceded by: Position Established
- Succeeded by: Timothy O. Howe

Personal details
- Born: Alexander Wolcott Stow; February 5, 1805 Lowville, New York
- Died: September 14, 1854 (aged 49) Milwaukee, Wisconsin
- Cause of death: Cholera
- Spouse: none
- Children: none
- Parents: Silas Stow (father); Mary (Ruggles) Stow (mother)
- Relatives: Horatio J. Stow (brother)
- Occupation: lawyer, judge

Alexander Wolcott Stow (February 5, 1805 – September 14, 1854) was an American lawyer and judge. He was the first chief justice of the Wisconsin Supreme Court.

== Early life ==
Born in Lowville, New York, Alexander Stow was the son of United States Congressman Silas Stow (1773–1827) and his wife Mary (Ruggles) Stow. His brother, Horatio J. Stow (c. 1809–1859), would become a New York State Senator. His father, in addition to serving in Congress, was a prominent judge in the county court and prioritized the education of his son. At age 16, he was placed in the United States Military Academy, but he left after one year. He returned to his hometown and studied law with a local practice and was soon admitted to the bar. He formed a partnership with Justin Butterfield, who would, in 1826, describe Stow as a man of superior constitutional powers.

After traveling extensively in Europe, he practiced law in Rochester, New York, for a number of years.

== Career in Wisconsin ==
In 1845, he moved to a farm in Taycheedah, in Fond du Lac County, Wisconsin Territory. At the time that Wisconsin adopted its constitution and became a state, in 1848, Stow was elected Wisconsin Circuit Court Judge for the 4th Circuit. In this era, the state's circuit court judges also constituted the Wisconsin Supreme Court. Stow was chosen by his colleagues as the first chief justice. He would remain in that office until the end of his term, January 1, 1851. Stow was famously opposed to the concept of an elected judiciary, he accepted his office reluctantly and pledged not to run for re-election.

After leaving office, he was involved with business in Fond du Lac and Milwaukee. Accounts differ on whether he continued to practice law. He died in Milwaukee on September 14, 1854.

== Personal life ==
Justice Stow was known to be somewhat eccentric and had a practice of letting meat rot before cooking and eating it. He never married and had no children.

Legal offices
New court	Wisconsin Circuit Court Judge for the 4th Circuit; 1848 – 1851	Succeeded by Timothy O. Howe
New office	Chief Justice of the Wisconsin Supreme Court; 1848 – 1851	Succeeded by Levi Hubbell
