= Parlan Semple =

American politician (1832–1922)

Parlan Semple (January 9, 1832 – June 27, 1922) was a member of the Wisconsin State Assembly.

== Biography ==
Semple was born on January 9, 1832, in Quebec. After his father's death, he lived with his mother and brother in Lowell, Massachusetts. In 1855, he married Louisa Hammond. They later moved to Shawano County, Wisconsin. After Louisa's death, he married Julia Emma Scott on his 54th birthday. They had one son. Semple died on June 27, 1922, in a nursing home in Green Bay, Wisconsin.

== Career ==
Semple was a member of the Assembly from 1869 to 1871. He was a Republican.
