= Horatio J. Stow =

American politician

Horatio J. Stow (c. 1809 in Lowville, Lewis County, New York – February 19, 1859 in Clifton Springs, Ontario County, New York) was an American politician from New York.

== Life ==
He was the son of Congressman Silas Stow (1773–1827) and Mary (Ruggles) Stow. He attended Lowville Academy. Then he studied law with Thomas C. Chittenden in Adams, Jefferson County, New York, was admitted to the bar, and practiced in Buffalo, New York. He married Anna J. Towers, and they had three children.

As a Whig, he was Recorder of Buffalo from 1840 to 1844; and a delegate to the New York State Constitutional Convention of 1846. In 1848, he joined the Free Soil Party. Afterwards he abandoned the practice of law, and engaged in agricultural pursuits in Lewiston, Niagara County, New York.

He was an Independent member of the New York State Senate (29th D.) in 1858 and 1859. He did not take his seat at the beginning of the session in 1859, and died on February 19.

Wisconsin Chief Judge Alexander W. Stow (1805–1854) was his brother; Assemblyman George D. Ruggles was his uncle.

== Sources ==
- The New York Civil List compiled by Franklin Benjamin Hough, Stephen C. Hutchins and Edgar Albert Werner (1867; pg. 391 and 442)
- Biographical Sketches of the State Officers and Members of the Legislature of the State of New York in 1859 by William D. Murray (pg. 99ff)
- Horatio J. Stow at Ancestry.com
- Courts and Lawyers of New York: a History from 1609 to 1925 by Alden Chester & Edwin Melvin Williams (Vol. I; pg. 1266;

New York State Senate
Preceded by Sidney Sweet	New York State Senate; 29th District; 1858–1859	Succeeded by George D. Lamont
