= 18th United States Congress =

1823-1825 U.S. Congress

←	17th	19th	→
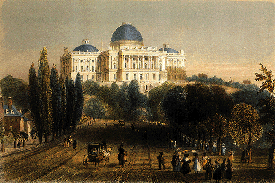
- United States Capitol (1827)

Overview
- Legislative body: United States Congress
- Jurisdiction: United States
- Term: March 4, 1823 – March 4, 1825

Senate
- Members: 48
- President: Daniel D. Tompkins (DR)
- President pro tempore: John Gaillard (DR)
- Party control: Democratic-Republican

House of Representatives
- Members: 213 representatives 3 non-voting delegates
- Speaker: Henry Clay (DR)
- Party control: Democratic-Republican

Sessions
- 1st: December 1, 1823 – May 27, 1824
- 2nd: December 6, 1824 – March 3, 1825

The 18th United States Congress was a meeting of the legislative branch of the United States federal government, consisting of the United States Senate and the United States House of Representatives. It met in Washington, D.C., from March 4, 1823, to March 4, 1825, during the seventh and eighth years of James Monroe's presidency. The apportionment of seats in the House of Representatives was based on the 1820 United States census. Both chambers had a Democratic-Republican majority.

== Major events ==
- August 1823: Arikara War fought between the Arikara nation and the United States, the first American military conflict with the Plains Indians.
- December 2, 1823: Monroe Doctrine: President James Monroe delivered a speech to the Congress, announcing a new policy of forbidding European interference in the Americas and establishing American neutrality in future European conflicts.
- February 9, 1825: John Quincy Adams elected as President of the United States by the House of Representatives in accordance with the contingent election provision of the Twelfth Amendment, as no candidate had received a majority of the electoral votes cast in the 1824 presidential election. The House was required to choose between Adams, Andrew Jackson, and William Crawford (the top three presidential electoral-vote recipients), with the delegation from each of the 24 states having one vote. Adams was elected on the first ballot by 13 to 7 to 4.

States for Adams	States for Jackson	States for Crawford
Connecticut; Illinois; Kentucky; Louisiana; Maine; Maryland; Massachusetts; Missouri; New Hampshire; New York; Ohio; Rhode Island; Vermont	Alabama; Indiana; Mississippi; New Jersey; Pennsylvania; South Carolina; Tennessee	Delaware; Georgia; North Carolina; Virginia
Total: 13 (54%)	Total: 7 (29%)	Total: 4 (17%)

== Major legislation ==
- January 7, 1824: Tariff of 1824, Sess. 1, ch. 4, 4 Stat. 2
- March 3, 1825: Crimes Act of 1825, Sess. 2, ch. 65, 4 Stat. 115

== Party summary ==
The count below identifies party affiliations at the beginning of the first session of this Congress, and includes members from vacancies and newly admitted states, when they were first seated. Changes resulting from subsequent replacements are shown below in the "Changes in membership" section. The 18th Congress was the final one in which members sat who are identified with the First Party System and the Federalist Party.

=== Senate ===
Affiliation	Party (Shading indicates majority caucus)		Total	
Affiliation	Democratic- Republican (DR)	Federalist (F)	Total	Vacant
End of previous Congress	43	4	47	1
Begin	42	3	45	3
End	43	5	48	0
Final voting share	89.6%	10.4%		
Beginning of next Congress	Jacksonian: 25		45	3
Beginning of next Congress	Adams Republican: 20		45	3

=== House of Representatives ===
Affiliation	Party (Shading indicates majority caucus)						Total	
Affiliation	Democratic-Republican			Federalist			Total	Vacant
Affiliation	Adams-Clay (A-DR)	Crawford (C-DR)	Jackson (J-DR)	Adams-Clay (A-F)	Crawford (C-F)	Jackson (J-F)	Total	Vacant
End of previous Congress	154			31			185	2
Begin	71	53	64	15	2	7	212	1
End	72	53	64	15	2	7	213	0
Final voting share	88.7%			11.3%				
Beginning of next Congress	Jacksonian: 104						213	0
Beginning of next Congress	Adams Republican: 109						213	0

== Leadership ==
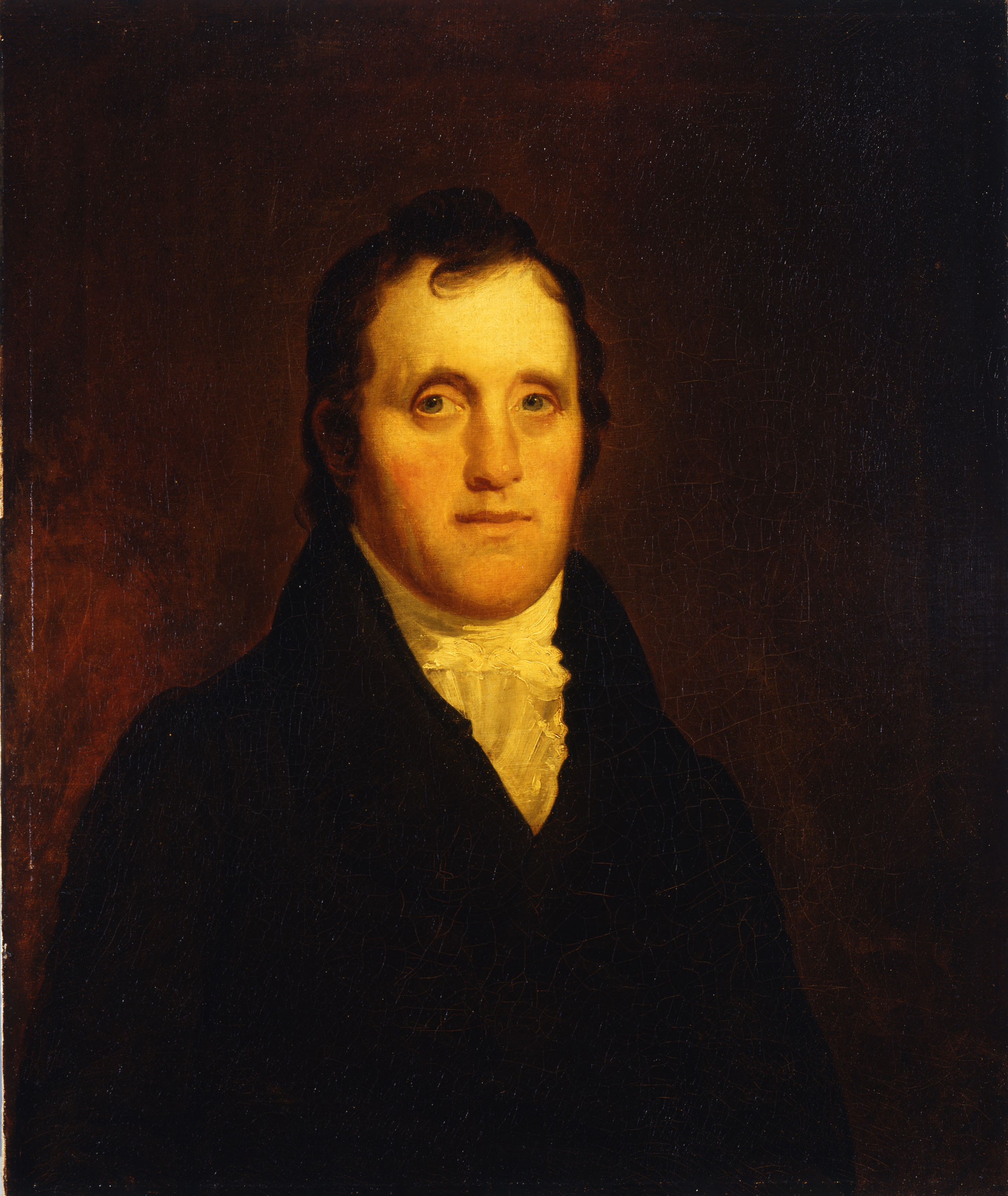
President of the Senate Daniel D. Tompkins

=== Senate ===
- President: Daniel D. Tompkins (DR)
- President pro tempore: John Gaillard (DR)

=== House of Representatives ===
- Speaker: Henry Clay (DR)

== Members ==
This list is arranged by chamber, then by state. Senators are listed by class, and representatives are listed by district.

Skip to House of Representatives, below

=== Senate ===
Senators were elected by the state legislatures every two years, with one-third beginning new six-year terms with each Congress. Preceding the names in the list below are Senate class numbers, which indicate the cycle of their election. In this Congress, Class 1 meant their term began in the last Congress, requiring re-election in 1826; Class 2 meant their term began with this Congress, requiring re-election in 1828; and Class 3 meant their term ended with this Congress, requiring re-election in 1824.

==== Alabama ====
▌2. William R. King (DR)
▌3. William Kelly (DR)

==== Connecticut ====
▌1. Elijah Boardman (DR), until August 18, 1823

▌Henry W. Edwards (DR), from October 8, 1823

▌3. James Lanman (DR)

==== Delaware ====
▌1. Thomas Clayton (F), from January 8, 1824
▌2. Nicholas Van Dyke (F), from January 7, 1824

==== Georgia ====
▌2. Nicholas Ware (DR), until September 7, 1824

▌Thomas W. Cobb (DR), from December 6, 1824

▌3. John Elliott (DR)

==== Illinois ====
▌2. Jesse B. Thomas (DR)
▌3. Ninian Edwards (DR), until March 4, 1824

▌John McLean (DR), from November 23, 1824

==== Indiana ====
▌1. James Noble (DR)
▌3. Waller Taylor (DR)

==== Kentucky ====
▌2. Richard M. Johnson (DR)
▌3. Isham Talbot (DR)

==== Louisiana ====
▌2. Henry Johnson (DR), until May 27, 1824

▌Dominique J. Bouligny (DR), from November 19, 1824

▌3. James Brown (DR), until December 10, 1823

▌Josiah S. Johnston (DR), from January 15, 1824

==== Maine ====
▌1. John Holmes (DR)
▌2. John Chandler (DR)

==== Maryland ====
▌1. Samuel Smith (DR)
▌3. Edward Lloyd (DR)

==== Massachusetts ====
▌1. Elijah H. Mills (F)
▌2. James Lloyd (F)

==== Mississippi ====
▌1. David Holmes (DR)
▌2. Thomas H. Williams (DR)

==== Missouri ====
▌1. Thomas H. Benton (DR)
▌3. David Barton (DR)

==== New Hampshire ====
▌2. Samuel Bell (DR)
▌3. John F. Parrott (DR)

==== New Jersey ====
▌1. Joseph McIlvaine (DR), from November 12, 1823
▌2. Mahlon Dickerson (DR)

==== New York ====
▌1. Martin Van Buren (DR)
▌3. Rufus King (F)

==== North Carolina ====
▌2. John Branch (DR)
▌3. Nathaniel Macon (DR)

==== Ohio ====
▌1. Benjamin Ruggles (DR)
▌3. Ethan Allen Brown (DR)

==== Pennsylvania ====
▌1. William Findlay (DR)
▌3. Walter Lowrie (DR)

==== Rhode Island ====
▌1. James DeWolf (DR)
▌2. Nehemiah R. Knight (DR)

==== South Carolina ====
▌2. Robert Y. Hayne (DR)
▌3. John Gaillard (DR)

==== Tennessee ====
▌1. John H. Eaton (DR)
▌2. Andrew Jackson (DR)

==== Vermont ====
▌1. Horatio Seymour (DR)
▌3. William A. Palmer (DR)

==== Virginia ====
▌1. James Barbour (DR)
▌2. John Taylor (DR), until August 21, 1824

▌Littleton W. Tazewell (DR), from December 7, 1824

Senators' party membership by state at the opening of the 18th Congress in March 1823. Delaware's senators were not seated until January 1824. 2 Democratic-Republicans 1 Democratic-Republican and 1 Federalist 2 Federalists

=== House of Representatives ===
The names of representatives are preceded by their district numbers.

==== Alabama ====
▌1. Gabriel Moore (DR-J)
▌2. John McKee (DR-J)
▌3. George W. Owen (DR-J)

==== Connecticut ====
All representatives were elected statewide on a general ticket.

▌At-large. Noyes Barber (DR-A)
▌At-large. Samuel A. Foot (DR-A)
▌At-large. Ansel Sterling (DR-A)
▌At-large. Ebenezer Stoddard (DR-A)
▌At-large. Gideon Tomlinson (DR-A)
▌At-large. Lemuel Whitman (DR-A)

==== Delaware ====
▌At-large. Louis McLane (F-C)

==== Georgia ====
All representatives were elected statewide on a general ticket.

▌At-large. Joel Abbot (DR-C)
▌At-large. George Cary (DR-C)
▌At-large. Thomas W. Cobb (DR-C), until December 6, 1824

▌Richard Henry Wilde (DR-C), from February 7, 1825

▌At-large. Alfred Cuthbert (DR-C)
▌At-large. John Forsyth (DR-C)
▌At-large. Edward F. Tattnall (DR-C)
▌At-large. Wiley Thompson (DR-C)

==== Illinois ====
▌At-large. Daniel P. Cook (DR-A)

==== Indiana ====
▌1. William Prince (DR-J), until September 8, 1824

▌Jacob Call (DR-J), from December 23, 1824

▌2. Jonathan Jennings (DR-J)
▌3. John Test (DR-J)

==== Kentucky ====
▌1. David Trimble (DR-A)
▌2. Thomas Metcalfe (DR-A)
▌3. Henry Clay (DR-A)
▌4. Robert P. Letcher (DR-A)
▌5. John T. Johnson (DR-J)
▌6. David White (DR-A)
▌7. Thomas P. Moore (DR-J)
▌8. Richard A. Buckner (DR-A)
▌9. Charles A. Wickliffe (DR-J)
▌10. Francis Johnson (DR-A)
▌11. Philip Thompson (DR-A)
▌12. Robert P. Henry (DR-J)

==== Louisiana ====
▌1. Edward Livingston (DR-J)
▌2. Henry H. Gurley (DR-A)
▌3. William L. Brent (DR-A)

==== Maine ====
▌1. William Burleigh (DR-A)
▌2. Stephen Longfellow (F-A)
▌3. Ebenezer Herrick (DR-A)
▌4. Joshua Cushman (DR-A)
▌5. Enoch Lincoln (DR-A)
▌6. Jeremiah O'Brien (DR-A)
▌7. David Kidder (DR-A)

==== Maryland ====
The 5th district was a plural district with two representatives.

▌1. Raphael Neale (F-A)
▌2. Joseph Kent (DR-A)
▌3. Henry R. Warfield (F-A)
▌4. John Lee (F-J)
▌5. Peter Little (DR-J)
▌5. Isaac McKim (DR-J)
▌6. George E. Mitchell (DR-A)
▌7. William Hayward Jr. (DR-C)
▌8. John S. Spence (DR-A)

==== Massachusetts ====
▌1. Daniel Webster (F-A)
▌2. Benjamin W. Crowninshield (DR-A)
▌3. Jeremiah Nelson (F-A)
▌4. Timothy Fuller (DR-A)
▌5. Jonas Sibley (DR-A)
▌6. John Locke (DR-A)
▌7. Samuel C. Allen (F-A)
▌8. Samuel Lathrop (F-A)
▌9. Henry W. Dwight (F-A)
▌10. John Bailey (DR-A), from December 13, 1824
▌11. Aaron Hobart (DR-A)
▌12. Francis Baylies (F-J)
▌13. John Reed Jr. (F-A)

==== Mississippi ====
▌At-large. Christopher Rankin (DR-J)

==== Missouri ====
▌At-large. John Scott (DR-A)

==== New Hampshire ====
All representatives were elected statewide on a general ticket.

▌At-large. Ichabod Bartlett (DR-A)
▌At-large. Matthew Harvey (DR-A)
▌At-large. Arthur Livermore (DR-A)
▌At-large. Aaron Matson (DR-A)
▌At-large. William Plumer Jr. (DR-A)
▌At-large. Thomas Whipple Jr. (DR-A)

==== New Jersey ====
All representatives were elected statewide on a general ticket.

▌At-large. George Cassedy (DR-J)
▌At-large. Lewis Condict (DR-J)
▌At-large. Daniel Garrison (DR-J)
▌At-large. George Holcombe (DR-J)
▌At-large. James Matlack (DR-A)
▌At-large. Samuel Swan (DR-J)

==== New York ====
There were three plural districts: the 20th & 26th had two representatives each, the 3rd had three representatives.

▌1. Silas Wood (DR-A)
▌2. Jacob Tyson (DR-C)
▌3. Churchill C. Cambreleng (DR-C)
▌3. John J. Morgan (DR-J)
▌3. Peter Sharpe (DR-A)
▌4. Joel Frost (DR-C)
▌5. William W. Van Wyck (DR-A)
▌6. Hector Craig (DR-J)
▌7. Lemuel Jenkins (DR-C)
▌8. James Strong (F-A)
▌9. James L. Hogeboom (DR-C)
▌10. Stephen Van Rensselaer (F-A)
▌11. Charles A. Foote (DR-C)
▌12. Lewis Eaton (DR-C)
▌13. Isaac Williams Jr. (DR-A)
▌14. Henry R. Storrs (F-A)
▌15. John Herkimer (DR-A)
▌16. John W. Cady (DR-A)
▌17. John W. Taylor (DR-A)
▌18. Henry C. Martindale (F-A)
▌19. John Richards (DR-C)
▌20. Ela Collins (DR-C)
▌20. Egbert Ten Eyck (DR-C)
▌21. Lot Clark (DR-C)
▌22. Justin Dwinell (DR-C)
▌23. Elisha Litchfield (DR-C)
▌24. Rowland Day (DR-C)
▌25. Samuel Lawrence (DR-A)
▌26. Dudley Marvin (DR-A)
▌26. Robert S. Rose (DR-A)
▌27. Moses Hayden (DR-A)
▌28. William B. Rochester (DR-A), until April 23, 1823

▌William Woods (DR-A), from November 3, 1823

▌29. Isaac Wilson (DR-A), until January 7, 1824

▌Parmenio Adams (DR-A), from January 7, 1824

▌30. Albert H. Tracy (DR-A)

==== North Carolina ====
▌1. Alfred M. Gatlin (DR-C)
▌2. Hutchins G. Burton (DR-C), until March 23, 1824

▌George Outlaw (DR-C), from January 19, 1825

▌3. Thomas H. Hall (DR-C)
▌4. Richard D. Spaight Jr. (DR-C)
▌5. Charles Hooks (DR-C)
▌6. Weldon N. Edwards (DR-C)
▌7. John Culpepper (F-A)
▌8. Willie P. Mangum (DR-C)
▌9. Romulus M. Saunders (DR-C)
▌10. John Long (DR-C)
▌11. Henry W. Connor (DR-J)
▌12. Robert B. Vance (DR-J)
▌13. Lewis Williams (DR-C)

==== Ohio ====
▌1. James W. Gazlay (DR-J)
▌2. Thomas R. Ross (DR-C)
▌3. William McLean (DR-A)
▌4. Joseph Vance (DR-A)
▌5. John W. Campbell (DR-J)
▌6. Duncan McArthur (DR-A)
▌7. Samuel F. Vinton (DR-A)
▌8. William Wilson (DR-C)
▌9. Philemon Beecher (DR-A)
▌10. John Patterson (DR-A)
▌11. John C. Wright (DR-A)
▌12. John Sloane (DR-A)
▌13. Elisha Whittlesey (DR-A)
▌14. Mordecai Bartley (DR-A)

==== Pennsylvania ====
There were six plural districts: the 7th, 8th, 11th, and 16th had two representatives each, the 4th and 9th had three representatives each.

▌1. Samuel Breck (F-A)
▌2. Joseph Hemphill (F-J)
▌3. Daniel H. Miller (DR-J)
▌4. James Buchanan (F-J)
▌4. Samuel Edwards (F-J)
▌4. Isaac Wayne (F-J)
▌5. Philip S. Markley (DR-J)
▌6. Robert Harris (DR-J)
▌7. Daniel Udree (DR-J)
▌7. Henry Wilson (DR-J)
▌8. Samuel D. Ingham (DR-J)
▌8. Thomas J. Rogers (DR-J), until April 20, 1824

▌George Wolf (DR-J), from December 9, 1824

▌9. William Cox Ellis (F-J)
▌9. George Kremer (DR-J)
▌9. Samuel McKean (DR-J)
▌10. James S. Mitchell (DR-J)
▌11. John Findlay (DR-J)
▌11. James Wilson (DR-J)
▌12. John Brown (DR-J)
▌13. John Tod (DR-J), until ????, 1824

▌Alexander Thomson (DR-J), from December 6, 1824

▌14. Andrew Stewart (DR-J)
▌15. Thomas Patterson (DR-J)
▌16. James Allison Jr. (DR-J)
▌16. Walter Forward (DR-J)
▌17. George Plumer (DR-J)
▌18. Patrick Farrelly (DR-J)

==== Rhode Island ====
All representatives were elected statewide on a general ticket.

▌At-large. Job Durfee (DR-A)
▌At-large. Samuel Eddy (DR-A)

==== South Carolina ====
▌1. Joel R. Poinsett (DR-J)
▌2. James Hamilton Jr. (DR-J)
▌3. Robert B. Campbell (DR-J)
▌4. Andrew R. Govan (DR-J)
▌5. George McDuffie (DR-J)
▌6. John Wilson (DR-J)
▌7. Joseph Gist (DR-J)
▌8. John Carter (DR-J)
▌9. Starling Tucker (DR-J)

==== Tennessee ====
▌1. John Blair (DR-J)
▌2. John Cocke (DR-J)
▌3. James I. Standifer (DR-J)
▌4. Jacob C. Isacks (DR-J)
▌5. Robert Allen (DR-J)
▌6. James T. Sandford (DR-J)
▌7. Samuel Houston (DR-J)
▌8. James B. Reynolds (DR-J)
▌9. Adam R. Alexander (DR-J)

==== Vermont ====
All representatives were elected statewide on a general ticket.

▌At-large. Rollin C. Mallary (DR-A)
▌At-large. William C. Bradley (DR-A)
▌At-large. Charles Rich (DR-A), until October 15, 1824

▌Henry Olin (DR-A), from December 13, 1824

▌At-large. Daniel A. A. Buck (DR-A)
▌At-large. Samuel C. Crafts (DR-A)

==== Virginia ====
▌1. Thomas Newton Jr. (DR-A)
▌2. Arthur Smith (DR-C)
▌3. William S. Archer (DR-C)
▌4. Mark Alexander (DR-C)
▌5. John Randolph (DR-C)
▌6. George Tucker (DR-C)
▌7. Jabez Leftwich (DR-C)
▌8. Burwell Bassett (DR-C)
▌9. Andrew Stevenson (DR-C)
▌10. William C. Rives (DR-C)
▌11. Philip P. Barbour (DR-C)
▌12. Robert S. Garnett (DR-C)
▌13. William Lee Ball (DR-C), until February 29, 1824

▌John Taliaferro (DR-C), from March 24, 1824

▌14. Charles F. Mercer (DR-C)
▌15. John S. Barbour (DR-C)
▌16. James Stephenson (F-C)
▌17. Jared Williams (DR-C)
▌18. Joseph Johnson (DR-J)
▌19. William McCoy (DR-C)
▌20. John Floyd (DR-C)
▌21. William Smith (DR-C)
▌22. Alexander Smyth (DR-C)

==== Non-voting members ====
Arkansas Territory. Henry W. Conway
Florida Territory. Richard K. Call
Michigan Territory. Gabriel Richard

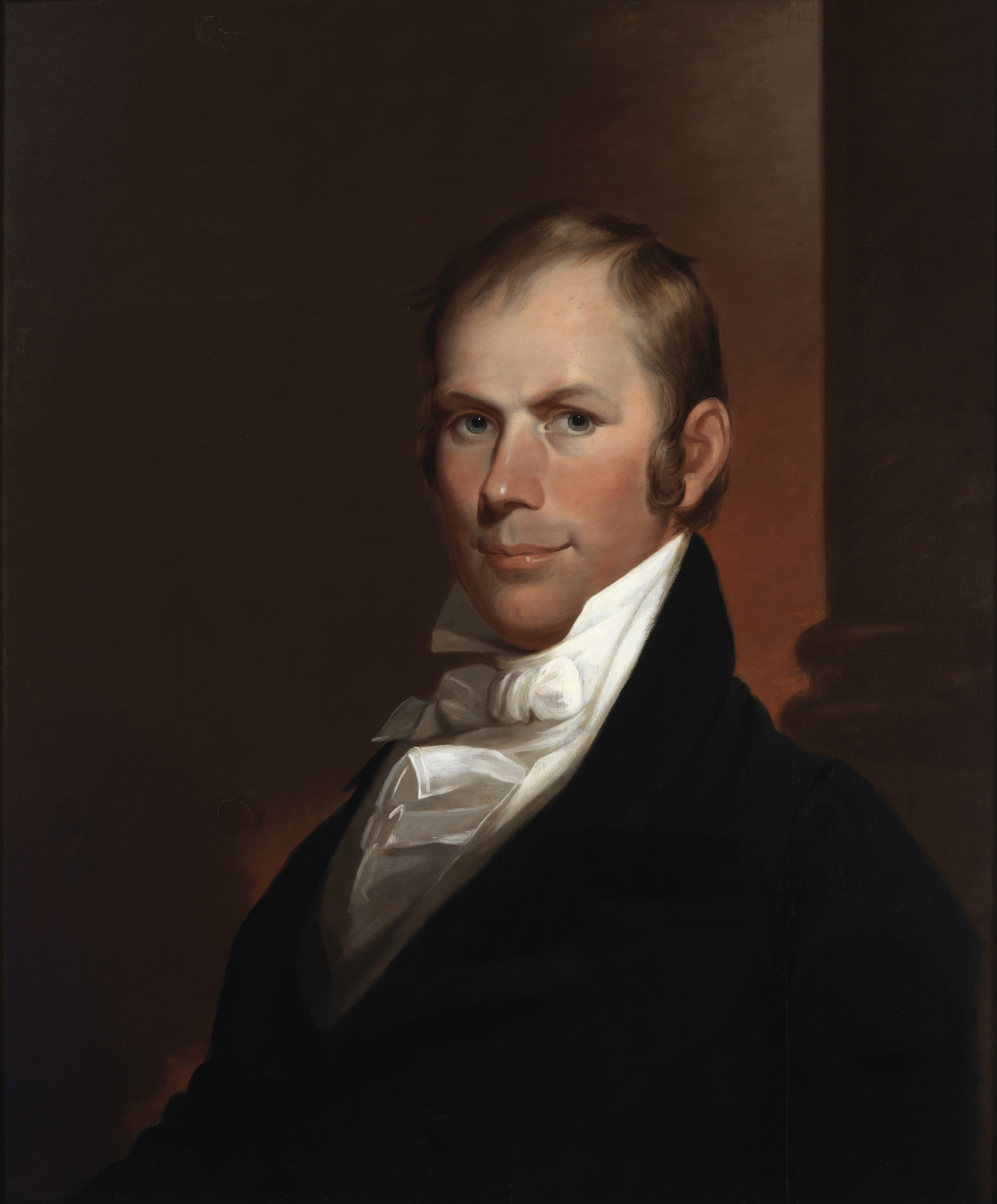
Speaker of the House Henry Clay

== Changes in membership ==
The count below reflects changes from the beginning of the first session of this Congress.

=== Senate ===
- Deaths: 3
- Resignations: 3
- Vacancy: 2
- Total seats with changes: 8

Senate changes
State (class)	Vacated by	Reason for change	Successor	Date of successor's formal installation (Note: When seated or oath administered, not necessarily when service began.)
New Jersey (1)	Vacant	Samuel L. Southard resigned at end of previous Congress. Successor elected November 12, 1823.	Joseph McIlvaine (DR)	November 12, 1823
Delaware (2)	Vacant	Legislature had failed to elect. Incumbent was re-elected late January 7, 1824.	Nicholas Van Dyke (F)	January 7, 1824
Delaware (1)	Vacant	Caesar A. Rodney resigned in previous term. Successor elected January 8, 1824.	Thomas Clayton (F)	January 8, 1824
Connecticut (1)	Elijah Boardman (DR)	Died August 18, 1823. Successor appointed October 8, 1823, and later elected May 5, 1824.	Henry W. Edwards (DR)	October 8, 1823
Louisiana (3)	James Brown (DR)	Resigned December 10, 1823, after being appointed Minister to France. Successor appointed January 15, 1824.	Josiah S. Johnston (DR)	January 15, 1824
Illinois (3)	Ninian Edwards (DR)	Resigned March 4, 1824, after being appointed Minister to Mexico. Successor elected November, 1824.	John McLean (DR)	November 23, 1824
Louisiana (2)	Henry Johnson (DR)	Resigned May 27, 1824, to run for Governor of Louisiana. Successor elected November 19, 1824.	Dominique J. Bouligny (DR)	November 19, 1824
Virginia (2)	John Taylor (DR)	Died August 21, 1824. Successor elected December 7, 1824.	Littleton W. Tazewell (DR)	December 7, 1824
Georgia (2)	Nicholas Ware (DR)	Died September 7, 1824. Successor elected December 6, 1824.	Thomas W. Cobb (DR)	December 6, 1824

=== House of Representatives ===
- Deaths: 3
- Resignations: 5
- Contested election: 2
- Total seats with changes: 10

House changes
District	Vacated by	Reason for change	Successor	Date of successor's formal installation
Massachusetts 10th	Vacant	John Bailey was declared not entitled to seat in previous election. Bailey was then re-elected.	John Bailey (A-DR)	Seated December 13, 1824.
New York 28th	William B. Rochester (A-DR)	Resigned April 21, 1823. New member elected.	William Woods (A-DR)	Seated November 3, 1823.
Pennsylvania 13th	John Tod (J-DR)	Resigned sometime in 1824. New member elected.	Alexander Thomson (J-DR)	Seated December 6, 1824.
New York 29th	Isaac Wilson (A-DR)	Lost contested election January 7, 1824. New member seated.	Parmenio Adams (A-DR)	Seated January 7, 1824.
Virginia 13th	William Lee Ball (C-DR)	Died February 29, 1824. New member elected.	John Taliaferro (C-DR)	Seated March 24, 1824.
North Carolina 2nd	Hutchins G. Burton (C-DR)	Resigned March 23, 1824, when elected Governor of North Carolina. New member elected.	George Outlaw (C-DR)	Seated January 19, 1825.
Pennsylvania 8th	Thomas J. Rogers (J-DR)	Resigned April 20, 1824. New member elected.	George Wolf (J-DR)	Seated December 9, 1824.
Indiana 1st	William Prince (J-DR)	Died September 8, 1824. New member elected.	Jacob Call (J-DR)	Seated December 23, 1824.
Vermont 3rd	Charles Rich (A-DR)	Died October 15, 1824. New member elected.	Henry Olin (A-DR)	Seated December 13, 1824.
Georgia at-large	Thomas W. Cobb (C-DR)	Resigned December 6, 1824, when elected U.S. Senator. New member elected.	Richard H. Wilde (C-DR)	Seated February 7, 1825.

== Committees ==
Lists of committees and their party leaders.

=== Senate ===
- Amendments to the Constitution (Select)
- Audit and Control the Contingent Expenses of the Senate (Chairman: Horatio Seymour)
- Banks in Which Deposits Have Been Made (Select)
- Claims (Chairman: Benjamin Ruggles)
- Commerce and Manufactures (Chairman: Mahlon Dickerson)
- Debt Imprisonment Abolition (Select)
- District of Columbia (Chairman: Edward Lloyd)
- Engrossed Bills (Chairman: James Lanman)
- Finance (Chairman: Samuel Smith)
- Foreign Relations (Chairman: James Barbour)
- Indian Affairs (Chairman: Thomas Hart Benton)
- Judiciary (Chairman: Martin Van Buren)
- Marquis de La Fayette (Select)
- Memorial of the Legislature of Arkansas (Select)
- Military Affairs (Chairman: Andrew Jackson)
- Militia (Chairman: John Chandler)
- National Road from Cumberland to Wheeling (Select)
- Naval Affairs (Chairman: James Lloyd)
- Peale's Portrait of Washington (Select)
- Pensions (Chairman: James Noble)
- Post Office and Post Roads (Chairman: James Lanman)
- Public Lands (Chairman: David Barton)
- Roads and Canals (Select) (Chairman: James Brown then Ethan Allen Brown)
- Tariff Regulation (Select)
- Whole

=== House of Representatives ===
- Accounts (Chairman: Samuel C. Allen)
- Agriculture (Chairman: Stephen Van Rensselaer)
- Arms Contracts (Select)
- Banking Memorials (Select)
- Claims (Chairman: Lewis Williams)
- Commerce (Chairman: Thomas Newton Jr.)
- District of Columbia (Chairman: Joseph Kent)
- Elections (Chairman: John Sloane)
- Expenditures in the Navy Department (Chairman: Samuel Edwards)
- Expenditures in the Post Office Department (Chairman: William Van Wyck)
- Expenditures in the State Department (Chairman: Silas Wood)
- Expenditures in the Treasury Department (Chairman: Weldon N. Edwards)
- Expenditures in the War Department
- Expenditures on Public Buildings (Chairman: Jeremiah Nelson)
- Foreign Affairs (Chairman: John Forsyth)
- Indian Affairs (Chairman: John Cocke)
- Judiciary (Chairman: Daniel Webster)
- Manufactures (Chairman: John Tod then Walter Forward)
- Military Affairs (Chairman: James Hamilton Jr.)
- Naval Affairs (Chairman: Benjamin W. Crowninshield)
- Pensions and Revolutionary War Claims (Chairman: Peter Little)
- Post Office and Post Roads (Chairman: John T. Johnson)
- Public Expenditures (Chairman: Thomas W. Cobb then Duncan McArthur)
- Public Lands (Chairman: Christopher Rankin)
- Revisal and Unfinished Business (Chairman: Thomas C. Ross then Samuel Lathrop)
- Standards of Official Conduct
- Ways and Means (Chairman: Louis McLane)
- Whole

=== Joint committees ===
- Enrolled Bills
- The Library

== Employees ==
=== Legislative branch agency directors ===
- Architect of the Capitol: Charles Bulfinch
- Librarian of Congress: George Watterston

=== Senate ===
- Chaplain: Charles P. McIlvaine (Episcopalian), until December 10, 1823
  - William Staughton (Baptist), elected December 10, 1823
  - Charles P. McIlvaine (Episcopalian), elected December 14, 1824
- Secretary: Charles Cutts
- Sergeant at Arms: Mountjoy Bayly

=== House of Representatives ===
- Chaplain: John Brackenridge (Presbyterian), until December 8, 1823
  - Henry B. Bascom (Methodist), elected December 8, 1823
  - Reuben Post (Presbyterian), elected December 9, 1824
- Clerk: Matthew St. Clair Clarke
- Doorkeeper: Benjamin Birch
- Sergeant at Arms: Thomas Dunn, elected December 1, 1823, died
  - John O. Dunn, elected December 6, 1824

== See also ==
- 1822 United States elections (elections leading to this Congress)
  - 1822–23 United States Senate elections
  - 1822–23 United States House of Representatives elections
- 1824 United States elections (elections during this Congress, leading to the next Congress)
  - 1824 United States presidential election
  - 1824–25 United States Senate elections
  - 1824–25 United States House of Representatives elections
