= 1824–25 United States House of Representatives elections =

House elections for the 19th U.S. Congress

- July 7, 1824 – August 30, 1825

All 213 seats in the United States House of Representatives 107 seats needed for a majority
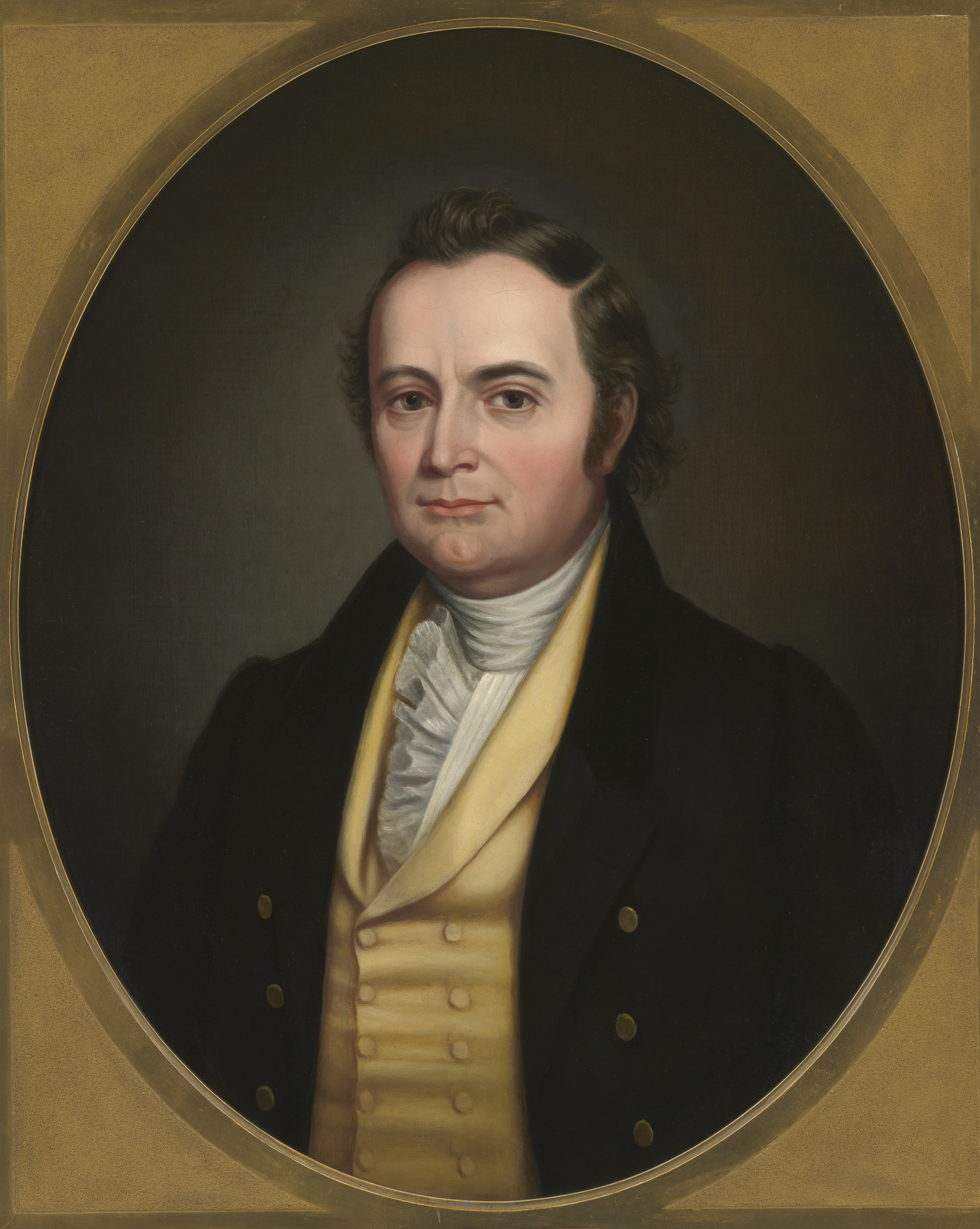

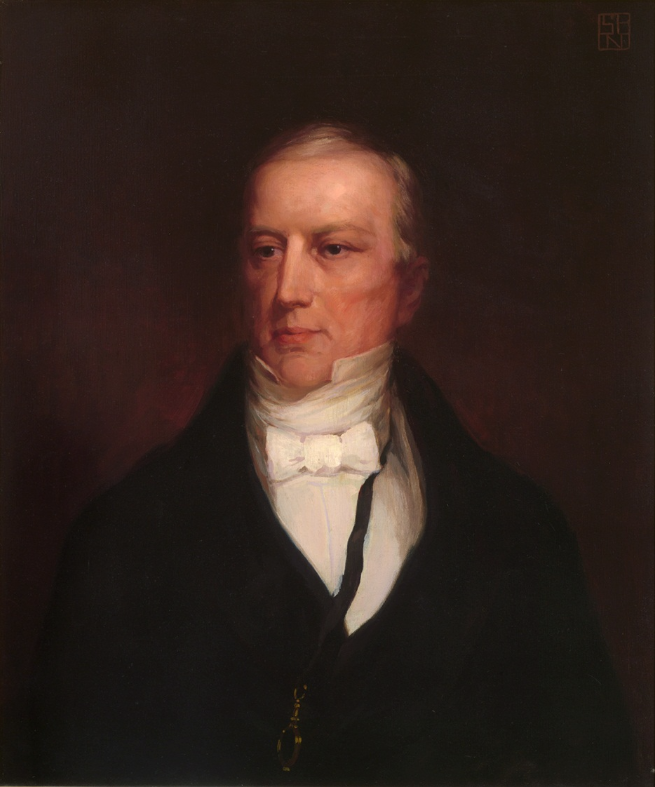
| | Majority party | Minority party |
|---|---|---|
| Leader | John W. Taylor | Andrew Stevenson |
| Party | Anti-Jacksonian | Jacksonian |
| Leader's seat | New York 17th | Virginia 9th |
| Last election | 87 seats (Note: In the case of the Anti-Jacksonians (aka. Adams Men), there were 72 "Adams-Clay" Democratic-Republicans and 15 "Adams-Clay" Federalists, for a total of 87 Anti-Jacksonians, in the U.S. House before the 1824 election.) | 71 seats (Note: In the case of the Jacksonians, there were 64 "Jackson" Democrat-Republicans and 7 "Jackson" Federalists, for a total of 71 Jacksonians, in the U.S. House before the 1824 election.) |
| Seats won | 109 | 104 |
| Seat change | ▲22 (Note: The Jacksonians and Anti-Jacksonians were two factions of the Democratic-Republican Party (mostly) that parted ways in 1824. Each member of Congress chose an allegiance before the 1824 election was held, so changes only indicate seats gained by each faction during the election.) | ▲33 |
- Results: Anti-Jacksonian hold Anti-Jacksonian gain Jacksonian hold Jacksonian gain Undistricted territory or split plural districts
Speaker before election
Henry Clay
Democratic-Republican
Elected Speaker
John W. Taylor
Anti-Jacksonian

The 1824–25 United States House of Representatives elections were held on various dates in various states between July 7, 1824, and August 30, 1825. Each state set its own date for its elections to the House of Representatives before the first session of the 19th United States Congress convened on December 5, 1825. Elections were held for all 213 seats, representing 24 states.

They coincided with the contentious 1824 presidential election. After no presidential candidate won an electoral majority, in February 1825 the House of the outgoing 18th Congress chose the President, John Quincy Adams, in a contingent election.

The approach of the 1824 presidential election ended the virtually nonpartisan Era of Good Feelings and motivated major realignment. The weak Federalist Party collapsed and the Democratic-Republican Party abruptly, catastrophically split.

Though Andrew Jackson lost the contingent election, public attitudes toward the charismatic, famous Jackson mainly determined the new alignment. Partisans of Jackson often were called Jacksonians, by 1828 adopting the Democratic Party label. Opponents of Jackson often were called Anti-Jacksonians, coalescing under the leadership of newly elected President John Quincy Adams and soon forming the National Republican Party.

Though both parties were new, and were not continuations of old parties, Jacksonians were more similar to the former Democratic-Republicans, while National Republicans were more similar to the former Federalists and also were political ancestors to the future Whig Party. Leadership of the National Republicans in opposition to Jackson later would transition to Henry Clay, whose support of Adams determined the contingent election.

== Election summaries ==
Representatives regrouped into Jackson supporters and Adams supporters (comprising the Adams-Clay faction in the contingent election), while supporters of William Crawford, whose ill health and retirement had indirectly helped trigger the realignment, divided between the two factions with 33 going to the Adams-Clay faction and 22 going to the Jackson faction.

↓
| 109 | 104 |
| Anti-Jacksonian | Jacksonian |

| State | Date ↑ | Type | Total seats | Anti-Jacksonian | | Jacksonian | |
| State | Date ↑ | Type | Total seats | Seats | Change | Seats | Change |
|---|---|---|---|---|---|---|---|
| Louisiana | July 7–9, 1824 | Districts | 3 | 2 | Steady | 1 | Steady |
| Illinois | August 2, 1824 | At-large | 1 | 1 | Steady | 0 | Steady |
| Indiana | August 2, 1824 | Districts | 3 | 2 | ▲2 | 1 | ▼2 |
| Kentucky | August 2, 1824 | Districts | 12 | 7 | ▼1 | 5 | ▲1 |
| Missouri | August 2, 1824 | At-large | 1 | 1 | Steady | 0 | Steady |
| Mississippi | August 2–3, 1824 | At-large | 1 | 0 | Steady | 1 | Steady |
| Vermont | September 7, 1824 (Note: n Vermont required a majority for electionecessitating an additional election held December 6, 1824.) | District | 5 | 4 | ▼1 | 1 | ▲1 |
| Maine | September 13, 1824 (Note: n Maine had a majority requirement for electionecessitating additional elections held January 3, April 4, and September 12, 1825.) | Districts | 7 | 6 | ▼1 | 1 | ▲1 |
| Georgia | October 4, 1824 | At-large | 7 | 0 | Steady | 7 | ▲7 |
| Maryland | October 4, 1824 | Districts | 9 | 7 | ▲2 | 2 | ▼1 |
| Delaware | October 5, 1824 | At-large | 1 | 0 | Steady | 1 | ▲1 |
| South Carolina | October 11–12, 1824 | Districts | 9 | 0 | Steady | 9 | Steady |
| Ohio | October 12, 1824 | Districts | 14 | 12 | ▲2 | 2 | Steady |
| Pennsylvania | October 12, 1824 | Districts | 26 | 4 | ▲3 | 22 | ▼3 |
| Massachusetts | November 1, 1824 (Note: Massachusetts had a majority requirement for election, which necessitated additional elections held January 3, April 1, and August 1, 1825.) | Districts | 13 | 12 | Steady | 1 | Steady |
| New Hampshire | November 1, 1824 (Note: Run-off election for 6th seat held March 8, 1825.) | At-large | 6 | 5 | ▼1 | 1 | ▲1 |
| New Jersey | November 2, 1824 | At-large | 6 | 3 | ▲2 | 3 | ▼2 |
| New York | November 1–3, 1824 | Districts | 34 | 26 | ▲8 | 8 | ▲6 |
Late elections (after the March 4, 1825, beginning of the term)
| Connecticut | April 4, 1825 | At-large | 6 | 6 | Steady | 0 | Steady |
| Virginia | April 1825 | Districts | 22 | 7 | ▲6 | 15 | ▲14 |
| Alabama | August 1–3, 1825 | Districts | 3 | 0 | Steady | 3 | Steady |
| Tennessee | August 4–5, 1825 | Districts | 9 | 0 | Steady | 9 | Steady |
| North Carolina | August 11, 1825 | Districts | 13 | 2 | ▲1 | 11 | ▲9 |
| Rhode Island | August 30, 1825 (Note: Run-off election for second seat held November 25, 1825.) | At-large | 2 | 2 | Steady | 0 | Steady |
| Total | | | 213 | 109 51.2% | ▲22 | 104 48.8% | ▲33 |

House seats
| Anti-Jacksonian | 51.17% |
| Jacksonian | 48.83% |

== Special elections ==
There were special elections in 1824 and 1825 to the 18th United States Congress and 19th United States Congress.

Special elections are sorted by date then district.

=== 18th Congress ===
| District | Incumbent | | | This race | |
| District | Member | Party | First elected | Results | Candidates |
|---|---|---|---|---|---|
| Indiana 1 | William Prince | Democratic- Republican | 1822 | Incumbent died September 8, 1824. New member elected in 1824 and seated December 23, 1824. Democratic-Republican hold. Winner not elected to the next term; see below. | ▌ ✓ Jacob Call (Jackson D-R) 50.4%; ▌Thomas H. Blake (Adams D-R) 48.8%; ▌Ratliff Boon (Jacksonian) 0.8% |
| Vermont at-large | Charles Rich | Democratic- Republican | 1812; 1814 (lost); 1816 | Incumbent died October 15, 1824, having already either retired or lost re-election. New member elected in 1824 and seated December 13, 1824. Democratic-Republican hold. Winner was not a candidate to the next term; see below. | ▌ ✓ Henry Olin (Adams-Clay D-R) 59.3%; ▌Charles K. Williams (Unknown) 39.0% |
| Virginia 13 | William Lee Ball | Democratic- Republican | 1817 | Incumbent died February 29, 1824. New member elected in 1824 and seated April 8, 1824. Democratic-Republican hold. Winner later re-elected to the next term; see below. | ▌ ✓ John Taliaferro (Crawford D-R); ▌John Hungerford (Democratic-Republican) |
| Pennsylvania 8 | Thomas J. Rogers | Democratic- Republican | 1818 (special) | Incumbent resigned April 20, 1824. New member elected October 12, 1824 and seated December 23, 1824. Democratic-Republican hold. Winner also elected to the next term; see below. | ▌ ✓ George Wolf (Jackson D-R); Uncontested |
| Pennsylvania 13 | John Tod | Democratic- Republican | 1820 | Incumbent resigned sometime in 1824. New member elected October 12, 1824 and seated December 6, 1824. Democratic-Republican hold. Winner also elected to the next term; see below. | ▌ ✓ Alexander Thomson (Jackson D-R); Uncontested |
| Massachusetts 10 | Vacant | | | John Bailey (D-R) declared not entitled to seat in previous election. Bailey was re-elected November 29, 1824 and seated December 13, 1824. Democratic-Republican gain. Winner later elected to the next term; see below. | First ballot (August 30, 1824): ▌John Bailey (Adams-Clay D-R) 47.3%; ▌Sher Leland (Democratic-Republican) 30.8%; Scattering 21.9%; Second ballot (November 1, 1824): ▌John Bailey (Adams-Clay D-R) 42.1%; ▌Richard Sullivan (Federalist) 25.5%; ▌Samuel Bugbee (Unknown) 24.4%; Scattering 8.1%; Third ballot (November 29, 1824): ▌ ✓ John Bailey (Adams-Clay D-R) 50.1%; ▌Rufus G. Amory (Unknown) 31.3%; ▌Samuel Bugbee (Unknown) 14.2%; Scattering 4.4% |
| Georgia at-large | Thomas W. Cobb | Democratic- Republican | 1816; 1820 (retired); 1822 | Incumbent resigned December 6, 1824, when elected U.S. Senator. New member elected in 1824 and seated February 7, 1825. Democratic-Republican hold. Winner was not a candidate for the next term; see below. | ▌ ✓ Richard H. Wilde (Crawford D-R) 61.2%; ▌William C. Lyman (Democratic-Republican) 38.8% |
| North Carolina 2 | Hutchins G. Burton | Democratic- Republican | 1819 | Incumbent resigned March 23, 1824, when elected Governor of North Carolina. New member elected January 6, 1825 and seated January 19, 1825. Democratic-Republican hold. Winner later elected to the next term; see below. | ▌ ✓ George Outlaw (Crawford D-R) 55.7%; ▌Willis Alston (Jackson D-R) 44.2% |

=== 19th Congress ===
| District | Incumbent | | | This race | |
| District | Member | Party | First elected | Results | Candidates |
|---|---|---|---|---|---|
| New Hampshire at-large | Vacant | | | Representative-elect James Miller declined to serve. New member elected March 8, 1825 and seated December 5, 1825 with the rest of the Congress. Anti-Jacksonian gain. | ▌ ✓ Titus Brown (Anti-Jacksonian) 100%; Uncontested |
| South Carolina 1 | Joel R. Poinsett | Jacksonian | 1820 | Incumbent resigned March 7, 1825, when appointed U.S. Minister to Mexico. New member elected May 17, 1825 and seated December 5, 1825. Jacksonian hold. | ▌ ✓ William Drayton (Jacksonian) 74.8%; ▌William Crafts (Federalist) 25.2% |
| Kentucky 3 | Henry Clay | Anti-Jacksonian | 1810; 1814 (resigned); 1814; 1815 (seat declared vacant); 1815 (special); 1820 (retired); 1822 | Incumbent resigned March 6, 1825, when appointed U.S. Secretary of State. New member elected August 1, 1825 and seated December 5, 1825. Anti-Jacksonian hold. | ▌ ✓ James Clark (Anti-Jacksonian) 59.4%; ▌Henry Bowman (Democratic-Republican) 40.6% |
| Pennsylvania 16 | James Allison Jr. | Jacksonian | 1822 | Incumbent resigned August 26, 1825, before Congress met. New member elected in 1825 and seated December 5, 1825. Jacksonian hold. | ▌ ✓ Robert Orr Jr. (Jacksonian) 56.7%; ▌Abner Lacock (Independent) 43.3% |

== Alabama ==
Alabama elected its members August 1–3, 1825, after the term began but before the new Congress convened.

| District | Incumbent | | | This race | |
| District | Member | Party | First elected | Results | Candidates |
|---|---|---|---|---|---|
| Alabama 1 "Northern district" | Gabriel Moore | Jackson; Democratic-Republican | 1821 | Incumbent re-elected as Jacksonian. | ▌ ✓ Gabriel Moore (Jackson D-R; Jacksonian) 71.1%; ▌Clement Comer Clay (Jackson D-R; Jacksonian) 28.9% |
| Alabama 2 "Middle district" | John McKee | Jackson; Democratic-Republican | 1823 | Incumbent re-elected as Jacksonian. | ▌ ✓ John McKee (Jackson D-R; Jacksonian) 40.9%; ▌R. E. B. Baylor (Jackson D-R; Jacksonian) 39.2%; ▌John D. Terrill (Unknown) 19.9% |
| Alabama 3 "Southern district" | George W. Owen | Jackson; Democratic-Republican | 1823 | Incumbent re-elected as Jacksonian. | ▌ ✓ George W. Owen (Jackson D-R; Jacksonian) 100%; Uncontested |

== Arkansas Territory ==
See Non-voting delegates, below.

== Connecticut ==
Connecticut elected its members April 4, 1825, after the term began but before the new Congress convened.

| District | Incumbent | | | This race | |
| District | Member | Party | First elected | Results | Candidates |
|---|---|---|---|---|---|
| Connecticut at-large 6 seats on a general ticket | Gideon Tomlinson | Adams-Clay; Democratic-Republican | 1818 | Incumbent re-elected as Anti-Jacksonian. | ▌ ✓ Gideon Tomlinson (Adams-Clay D-R; Anti-Jacksonian) 15.8%; ▌ ✓ Elisha Phelps (Adams-Clay D-R; Anti-Jacksonian) 14.9%; ▌ ✓ Ralph I. Ingersoll (Adams-Clay D-R; Anti-Jacksonian) 13.9%; ▌ ✓ Orange Merwin (Adams-Clay D-R; Anti-Jacksonian) 13.9%; ▌ ✓ Noyes Barber (Adams-Clay D-R; Anti-Jacksonian) 11.1%; ▌ ✓ John Baldwin (Adams-Clay D-R; Anti-Jacksonian) 9.2%; ▌Daniel Burrows (Democratic-Republican) 4.5%; ▌Elisha Tracy (Democratic-Republican) 3.8%; ▌Timothy Pitkin (Federalist) 3.3%; ▌Calvin Willey (Jackson D-R; Jacksonian) 2.3%; ▌Samuel A. Foot (Adams-Clay D-R; Anti-Jacksonian) 1.4%; ▌Dennis Kimberly (Unknown) 1.0%; ▌Asa Barron (Federalist) 1.0%; ▌George Learnid (Unknown) 1.0%; Others: ▌Samuel Church (Unknown) 0.8%; ▌Robert Fairchild (Unknown) 0.6%; ▌Roger Sherman (Unknown) 0.5%; ▌Lyman Law (Federalist) 0.4%; ▌Calvin Goddard (Federalist) 0.4%; ▌Thomas Williams (Adams-Clay Federalist; Anti-Jacksonian) 0.4% |
| Connecticut at-large 6 seats on a general ticket | Ansel Sterling | Adams-Clay; Democratic-Republican | 1821 | Incumbent retired. Anti-Jacksonian hold. | |
| Connecticut at-large 6 seats on a general ticket | Samuel A. Foote | Adams-Clay; Democratic-Republican | 1823 | Incumbent lost re-election. Anti-Jacksonian hold. | |
| Connecticut at-large 6 seats on a general ticket | Lemuel Whitman | Adams-Clay; Democratic-Republican | 1823 | Incumbent retired. Anti-Jacksonian hold. | |
| Connecticut at-large 6 seats on a general ticket | Noyes Barber | Adams-Clay; Democratic-Republican | 1821 | Incumbent re-elected as Anti-Jacksonian. | |
| Connecticut at-large 6 seats on a general ticket | Ebenezer Stoddard | Adams-Clay; Democratic-Republican | 1821 | Incumbent retired. Anti-Jacksonian hold. | |

== Delaware ==
Delaware elected its member October 5, 1824.

| District | Incumbent | | | This race | |
| District | Member | Party | First elected | Results | Candidates |
|---|---|---|---|---|---|
| Delaware at-large | Louis McLane | Crawford Federalist | 1816 | Incumbent re-elected as Jacksonian. Jacksonian gain. | ▌ ✓ Louis McLane (Crawford Federalist; Jacksonian) 51.7%; ▌Arnold Naudain (Adams-Clay D-R; Anti-Jacksonian) 48.3%; ▌ Unidentified Scattering 0.1% |

== Florida Territory ==
See Non-voting delegates, below.

== Georgia ==
Georgia elected its members October 4, 1824. There were only 7 candidates who ran statewide in 1824. There were several other candidates who received votes in a small number of states, but vote totals were only available for the seven winning candidates. The minor candidates only received a few hundred votes each.

| District | Incumbent | | | This race | |
| District | Member | Party | First elected | Results | Candidates |
|---|---|---|---|---|---|
| Georgia at-large 7 seats on a general ticket | Joel Abbot | Crawford; Democratic-Republican | 1816 | Incumbent retired. Jacksonian gain. | ▌ ✓ Wiley Thompson (Crawford D-R; Jacksonian) 15.1%; ▌ ✓ John Forsyth (Crawford D-R; Jacksonian) 14.6%; ▌ ✓ Edward F. Tattnall (Crawford D-R; Jacksonian) 14.4%; ▌ ✓ Alfred Cuthbert (Crawford D-R; Jacksonian) 14.2%; ▌ ✓ George Cary (Crawford D-R; Jacksonian) 13.8%; ▌ ✓ James Meriwether (Crawford D-R; Jacksonian) 13.4%; ▌ ✓ Charles E. Haynes (Crawford D-R; Jacksonian) 12.7%; ▌Longstreet (Note: Full name not given in source.) (Unknown) 0.8%; ▌Duncan G. Campbell (Jackson D-R; Jacksonian) 0.4%; ▌Samuel Rockwell (Jackson D-R; Jacksonian) 0.3%; ▌Charles J. MacDonald (Jackson D-R; Jacksonian) 0.3%; ▌Thomas W. Cobb (Crawford D-R; Jacksonian) <0.01%; ▌Joel Abbot (Crawford D-R; Jacksonian) <0.01% |
| Georgia at-large 7 seats on a general ticket | Alfred Cuthbert | Crawford; Democratic-Republican | 1820 | Incumbent re-elected as Jacksonian. Jacksonian gain. | |
| Georgia at-large 7 seats on a general ticket | George Cary | Crawford; Democratic-Republican | 1822 | Incumbent re-elected as Jacksonian. Jacksonian gain. | |
| Georgia at-large 7 seats on a general ticket | Edward F. Tattnall | Crawford; Democratic-Republican | 1820 | Incumbent re-elected as Jacksonian. Jacksonian gain. | |
| Georgia at-large 7 seats on a general ticket | John Forsyth | Crawford; Democratic-Republican | 1822 | Incumbent re-elected as Jacksonian. Jacksonian gain. | |
| Georgia at-large 7 seats on a general ticket | Wiley Thompson | Crawford; Democratic-Republican | 1820 | Incumbent re-elected as Jacksonian. Jacksonian gain. | |
| Georgia at-large 7 seats on a general ticket | Thomas W. Cobb | Crawford; Democratic-Republican | 1822 | Incumbent retired. Jacksonian gain. | |

== Illinois ==
Illinois elected its member August 2, 1824.

In 1824 a proposal was made to hold a convention to make Illinois a slave state. The Pro-Slavery Party was led by former Governor Bond and others, while the Anti-Slavery Party was led by Governor Coles and others. The election took place on August 2, resulting in Illinois voting against the convention and electing the anti-slavery candidate, Daniel P. Cook. Despite the failure of the plan to officially make Illinois a slave state, the state effectively continued the practice through laws that classified Black individuals as "indentured servants," which in practice made them slaves.

| District | Incumbent | | | This race | |
| District | Member | Party | First elected | Results | Candidates |
|---|---|---|---|---|---|
| Illinois at-large | Daniel P. Cook | Adams-Clay; Democratic-Republican | 1819 | Incumbent re-elected as Anti-Jacksonian. | ▌ ✓ Daniel P. Cook (Anti-Slavery; Anti-Jacksonian) 63.4%; ▌Shadrach Bond (Pro-Slavery; Jacksonian) 36.6% |

== Indiana ==
Indiana elected its members August 2, 1824.

| District | Incumbent | | | This race | |
| District | Member | Party | First elected | Results | Candidates |
|---|---|---|---|---|---|
| Indiana 1 | Jacob Call | Jackson; Democratic-Republican | 1824 | Incumbent retired. Jacksonian hold. Incumbent then died September 8, 1824, leading to a special election to finish the term. | ▌ ✓ Ratliff Boon (Jackson D-R; Jacksonian) 42.1%; ▌Jacob Call (Jackson D-R; Jacksonian) 31.7%; ▌Thomas H. Blake (Adams-Clay D-R; Anti-Jacksonian) 26.2% |
| Indiana 2 | Jonathan Jennings | Adams-Clay; Democratic-Republican | 1822 (special) | Incumbent re-elected as Anti-Jacksonian. | ▌ ✓ Jonathan Jennings (Adams-Clay D-R; Anti-Jacksonian) 53.2%; ▌Jeremiah Sullivan (Adams-Clay D-R; Anti-Jacksonian) 46.8% |
| Indiana 3 | John Test | Adams-Clay; Democratic-Republican | 1822 | Incumbent re-elected as Anti-Jacksonian. | ▌ ✓ John Test (Adams-Clay D-R; Anti-Jacksonian) 44.5%; ▌James Brown Ray (Adams-Clay D-R; Anti-Jacksonian) 37.1%; ▌Daniel J. Caswell (Democratic-Republican) 18.4% |

== Kentucky ==
Kentucky elected its members August 2, 1824.

| District | Incumbent | | | This race | |
| District | Member | Party | First elected | Results | Candidates |
|---|---|---|---|---|---|
| Kentucky 1 | David Trimble | Adams-Clay; Democratic-Republican | 1816 | Incumbent re-elected as Anti-Jacksonian. | ▌ ✓ David Trimble (Note: Source does not give numbers of votes or has incomplete data.) (Adams-Clay D-R; Anti-Jacksonian); Uncontested |
| Kentucky 2 | Thomas Metcalfe | Adams-Clay; Democratic-Republican | 1818 | Incumbent re-elected as Anti-Jacksonian. | ▌ ✓ Thomas Metcalfe (Adams-Clay D-R; Anti-Jacksonian) 82.3%; ▌Walker Reed (Unknown) 13.2%; ▌William Worthington (Unknown) 4.5% |
| Kentucky 3 | Henry Clay | Adams-Clay; Democratic-Republican | 1810; 1814 (resigned); 1814; 1815 (seat declared vacant); 1815 (special); 1820 (retired); 1822 | Incumbent re-elected as Anti-Jacksonian. Incumbent later resigned to become U.S. Secretary of State and was replaced in a special election. | ▌ ✓ Henry Clay (Adams-Clay D-R; Anti-Jacksonian) 100%; Uncontested |
| Kentucky 4 | Robert P. Letcher | Adams-Clay; Democratic-Republican | 1822 | Incumbent re-elected as Anti-Jacksonian. | ▌ ✓ Robert P. Letcher (Adams-Clay D-R; Anti-Jacksonian) 60.1%; ▌John Speed Smith (Democratic-Republican) 39.9% |
| Kentucky 5 | John T. Johnson | Jackson; Democratic-Republican | 1820 | Incumbent retired. Jacksonian hold. | ▌ ✓ James Johnson (Jackson D-R; Jacksonian) 55.8%; ▌Robert L. McHatton (Jackson D-R; Jacksonian) 44.2% |
| Kentucky 6 | David White | Adams-Clay; Democratic-Republican | 1822 | Incumbent retired. Jacksonian gain. | ▌ ✓ Joseph Lecompte (Jackson D-R; Jacksonian); ▌John Logan (Unknown) |
| Kentucky 7 | Thomas P. Moore | Jackson; Democratic-Republican | 1822 | Incumbent re-elected as Jacksonian. | ▌ ✓ Thomas P. Moore (Jackson D-R; Jacksonian); ▌Samuel Woodson (Democratic-Republican) |
| Kentucky 8 | Richard A. Buckner | Adams-Clay; Democratic-Republican | 1822 | Incumbent re-elected as Anti-Jacksonian. | ▌ ✓ Richard A. Buckner (Adams-Clay D-R; Anti-Jacksonian) 86.7%; ▌Tunstall Quarles (Jackson D-R; Jacksonian) 13.3% |
| Kentucky 9 | Charles A. Wickliffe | Jackson; Democratic-Republican | 1822 | Incumbent re-elected as Jacksonian. | ▌ ✓ Charles A. Wickliffe (Jackson D-R; Jacksonian) 58.5%; ▌Burr Harrison (Unknown) 28.7%; ▌Norborne B. Beall (Unknown) 12.8% |
| Kentucky 10 | Francis Johnson | Adams-Clay; Democratic-Republican | 1820 (special) | Incumbent re-elected as Anti-Jacksonian. | ▌ ✓ Francis Johnson (Adams-Clay D-R; Anti-Jacksonian) 70.1%; ▌Robert F. Slaughter (Unknown) 29.9% |
| Kentucky 11 | Philip Thompson | Adams-Clay; Democratic-Republican | 1822 | Incumbent lost re-election. Anti-Jacksonian hold. | ▌ ✓ William S. Young (Adams-Clay D-R; Anti-Jacksonian); ▌Benjamin Hardin (Adams-Clay D-R; Anti-Jacksonian); ▌John Calhoon (Adams-Clay D-R; Anti-Jacksonian); ▌Philip Thompson (Adams-Clay D-R; Anti-Jacksonian); ▌Francis E. Walker (Unknown) |
| Kentucky 12 | Robert P. Henry | Jackson; Democratic-Republican | 1822 | Incumbent re-elected as Jacksonian. | ▌ ✓ Robert P. Henry (Jackson D-R; Jacksonian); Uncontested |

== Louisiana ==
Louisiana elected its members July 7–9, 1824.

| District | Incumbent | | | This race | |
| District | Member | Party | First elected | Results | Candidates |
|---|---|---|---|---|---|
| Louisiana 1 | Edward Livingston | Jackson; Democratic-Republican | 1822 | Incumbent re-elected as Jacksonian. | ▌ ✓ Edward Livingston (Jackson D-R; Jacksonian) 98.3%; Scattering 1.8% |
| Louisiana 2 | Henry H. Gurley | Adams-Clay; Democratic-Republican | 1822 | Incumbent re-elected as Anti-Jacksonian. | ▌ ✓ Henry H. Gurley (Adams-Clay D-R; Anti-Jacksonian) 100% |
| Louisiana 3 | William L. Brent | Adams-Clay; Democratic-Republican | 1822 | Incumbent re-elected as Anti-Jacksonian. | ▌ ✓ William L. Brent (Adams-Clay D-R; Anti-Jacksonian) 60.8%; ▌Henry Bullard (Adams-Clay D-R; Anti-Jacksonian) 39.3% |

== Maine ==
Maine elected its members September 13, 1824. Maine law required a majority vote for election, n Maine law required a majority vote for electionecessitating additional ballots in the 3rd and 4th districts on January 3, 1825, April 4, 1825, and September 12, 1825.

| District | Incumbent | | | This race | |
| District | Member | Party | First elected | Results | Candidates |
|---|---|---|---|---|---|
| Maine 1 | William Burleigh | Adams-Clay; Democratic-Republican | 1823 | Incumbent re-elected as Anti-Jacksonian. | ▌ ✓ William Burleigh (Adams-Clay D-R; Anti-Jacksonian) 67.6%; ▌Rufus MacIntire (Crawford D-R; Jacksonian) 22.0%; ▌John MacDonald (Democratic-Republican) 8.2%; ▌Isaac Lane (Crawford D-R; Jacksonian) 0.8%; ▌Jeremiah Goodwin (Unknown) 0.8%; Scattering 0.5% |
| Maine 2 | Stephen Longfellow | Adams-Clay Federalist | 1823 | Incumbent lost re-election. Jacksonian gain. | ▌ ✓ John Anderson (Crawford D-R; Jacksonian) 55.4%; ▌Stephen Longfellow (Adams-Clay Federalist; Anti-Jacksonian) 43.8%; ▌James Irish (Democratic-Republican) 0.2%; ▌Phinchas Varnum (Unknown) 0.2%; Scattering 0.5% |
| Maine 3 | Ebenezer Herrick | Adams-Clay; Democratic-Republican | 1821 | Incumbent re-elected as Anti-Jacksonian. | First ballot (September 13, 1824): ▌Ebenezer Herrick (Adams-Clay D-R; Anti-Jacksonian) 46.2%; ▌Albert Smith (Unknown) 35.8%; ▌Ebenezer Thatcher (Unknown) 14.3%; ▌James MacLellan (Unknown) 0.9%; ▌Jeremiah Bailey (Adams-Clay Federalist; Anti-Jacksonian) 0.6%; ▌Stephen Parsons (Adams-Clay D-R; Anti-Jacksonian) 0.4%; ▌Ebenezer Delano (Unknown) 0.4%; ▌William King (Adams-Clay D-R; Anti-Jacksonian) 0.3%; Second ballot (January 3, 1825): ▌Ebenezer Herrick (Adams-Clay D-R; Anti-Jacksonian) 44.4%; ▌Albert Smith (Unknown) 27.2%; ▌Ebenezer Thatcher (Unknown) 24.3%; ▌Elisha J. Ford (Unknown) 1.8%; ▌Moses Carlton (Democratic-Republican) 1.2%; Scattering 1.1%; Third ballot (April 4, 1825): ▌Ebenezer Herrick (Adams-Clay D-R; Anti-Jacksonian) 49.6%; ▌Albert Smith (Unknown) 31.7%; ▌Ebenezer Thatcher (Unknown) 15.1%; ▌Daniel Rose (Adams-Clay D-R; Anti-Jacksonian) 2.0%; ▌Edwin Smith (Unknown) 0.5%; ▌Moses Carlton (Democratic-Republican) 0.3%; Scattering 0.8%; Fourth ballot (September 12, 1825): ▌ ✓ Ebenezer Herrick (Adams-Clay D-R; Anti-Jacksonian) 55.5%; ▌Albert Smith (Unknown) 25.8%; ▌Daniel Rose (Adams-Clay D-R; Anti-Jacksonian) 17.6%; ▌Abraham Hammatt (Unknown) 0.5%; Scattering 0.6% |
| Maine 4 | Joshua Cushman | Adams-Clay; Democratic-Republican | 1818 (Note: In Massachusetts's 19th district) | Incumbent lost re-election. Anti-Jacksonian hold. | First ballot (September 13, 1824): ▌Thomas Fillebrown (Unknown) 27.7%; ▌Peleg Sprague (Adams-Clay D-R; Anti-Jacksonian) 23.6%; ▌Joshua Cushman (Adams-Clay D-R; Anti-Jacksonian) 19.0%; ▌Robert C. Vose (Unknown) 9.5%; ▌Sanford Kingsbury (Adams-Clay D-R; Anti-Jacksonian) 6.5%; ▌Rufus Burnham (Democratic-Republican) 4.0%; ▌Ebenezer T. Warren (Unknown) 2.7%; ▌John Comings (Unknown) 1.2%; ▌Thomas Bond (Democratic-Republican) 1.1%; ▌Timothy Boutelle (Federalist) 0.8%; Scattering 4%; Second ballot (January 3, 1825): No data available for 2nd ballot; Third ballot (April 4, 1825): ▌ ✓ Peleg Sprague (Adams-Clay D-R; Anti-Jacksonian) 65.9%; ▌Robert C. Vose (Unknown) 15.0%; ▌Thomas Fillebrown (Unknown) 13.6%; ▌Joshua Cushman (Adams-Clay D-R; Anti-Jacksonian) 2.1%; ▌Timothy Boutelle (Federalist) 2.1%; ▌Sanford Kingsbury (Adams-Clay D-R; Anti-Jacksonian) 1.0%; Scattering 0.3% |
| Maine 5 | Enoch Lincoln | Adams-Clay; Democratic-Republican | 1818 (special) (Note: In Massachusetts's 20th district) | Incumbent re-elected as Anti-Jacksonian. | ▌ ✓ Enoch Lincoln (Adams-Clay D-R; Anti-Jacksonian); Uncontested |
| Maine 6 | Jeremiah O'Brien | Adams-Clay; Democratic-Republican | 1823 | Incumbent re-elected as Anti-Jacksonian. | ▌ ✓ Jeremiah O'Brien (Adams-Clay D-R; Anti-Jacksonian) 78.7%; ▌Ebenezer Poor (Democratic-Republican) 21.3% |
| Maine 7 | David Kidder | Adams-Clay; Federalist | 1823 | Incumbent re-elected as Anti-Jacksonian. | ▌ ✓ David Kidder (Adams-Clay Federalist; Anti-Jacksonian) 65.0%; ▌William D. Williamson (Adams-Clay D-R; Anti-Jacksonian) 23.7%; ▌Allen Gilman (Unknown) 4.2%; Scattering 7.1% |

== Maryland ==
Maryland elected its members October 4, 1824.

| District | Incumbent | | | This race | |
| District | Member | Party | First elected | Results | Candidates |
|---|---|---|---|---|---|
| Maryland 1 | Raphael Neale | Adams-Clay Federalist | 1818 | Incumbent lost re-election. Anti-Jacksonian hold. | ▌ ✓ Clement Dorsey (Adams-Clay Federalist; Anti-Jacksonian) 55.3%; ▌Raphael Neale (Adams-Clay Federalist; Anti-Jacksonian) 44.7% |
| Maryland 2 | Joseph Kent | Adams-Clay; Democratic-Republican | 1810; 1814 (lost); 1818 | Incumbent re-elected as Anti-Jacksonian. | ▌ ✓ Joseph Kent (Adams-Clay D-R; Anti-Jacksonian) 52.3%; ▌John C. Weems (Jackson Federalist; Jacksonian) 47.7% |
| Maryland 3 | Henry R. Warfield | Adams-Clay Federalist | 1820 | Incumbent retired. Jacksonian gain. | ▌ ✓ George Peter (Jackson D-R; Jacksonian) 37.5%; ▌George C. Washington (Adams-Clay Federalist; Anti-Jacksonian) 33.9%; ▌Henry R. Warfield (Adams-Clay Federalist; Anti-Jacksonian) 28.7% |
| Maryland 4 | John Lee | Jackson Federalist | 1822 | Incumbent lost re-election. Anti-Jacksonian gain. | ▌ ✓ Thomas C. Worthington (Adams-Clay D-R; Anti-Jacksonian) 55.2%; ▌John Lee (Jackson Federalist; Jacksonian) 44.6% |
| Maryland 5 Plural district with 2 seats | Isaac McKim | Jackson; Democratic-Republican | 1823 (special) | Incumbent lost re-election. Anti-Jacksonian gain. | ▌ ✓ Peter Little (Adams-Clay D-R; Anti-Jacksonian) 47.1%; ▌ ✓ John Barney (Adams-Clay D-R; Anti-Jacksonian) 26.8%; ▌Isaac McKim (Jackson D-R; Jacksonian) 26.0% |
| Maryland 5 Plural district with 2 seats | Peter Little | Adams-Clay; Democratic-Republican | 1810; 1812 (lost); 1816 | Incumbent re-elected as Anti-Jacksonian. | ▌ ✓ Peter Little (Adams-Clay D-R; Anti-Jacksonian) 47.1%; ▌ ✓ John Barney (Adams-Clay D-R; Anti-Jacksonian) 26.8%; ▌Isaac McKim (Jackson D-R; Jacksonian) 26.0% |
| Maryland 6 | George E. Mitchell | Jackson; Democratic-Republican | 1822 | Incumbent re-elected as Jacksonian. | ▌ ✓ George E. Mitchell (Jackson D-R; Jacksonian) 53.9%; ▌Phillip Reed (Federalist) 45.9% |
| Maryland 7 | William Hayward Jr. | Crawford; Democratic-Republican | 1822 | Incumbent retired. Anti-Jacksonian gain. | ▌ ✓ John Leeds Kerr (Adams-Clay Federalist; Anti-Jacksonian) 50.3%; ▌Thomas Emory (Democratic-Republican) 49.7% |
| Maryland 8 | John S. Spence | Adams-Clay; Democratic-Republican | 1822 | Incumbent lost re-election. Anti-Jacksonian hold. | ▌ ✓ Robert N. Martin (Adams-Clay Federalist; Anti-Jacksonian) 51.9%; ▌John S. Spence (Adams-Clay D-R; Anti-Jacksonian) 48.1% |

== Massachusetts ==
Massachusetts elected its members November 1, 1824. Massachusetts had a majority requirement for election, which necessitated additional elections held January 3, 1825, April 1, 1825, and August 1, 1825.

District numbers vary between sources.

| District | Incumbent | | | This race | |
| District | Member | Party | First elected | Results | Candidates |
|---|---|---|---|---|---|
| Massachusetts 1 "Suffolk district" | Daniel Webster | Adams-Clay Federalist | 1812 (Note: In New Hampshire); 1816 (retired); 1822 | Incumbent re-elected as Anti-Jacksonian. | ▌ ✓ Daniel Webster (Adams-Clay Federalist; Anti-Jacksonian) 99.9% |
| Massachusetts 2 "Essex South district" | Benjamin W. Crowninshield | Adams-Clay; Democratic-Republican | 1823 | Incumbent re-elected as Anti-Jacksonian. | ▌ ✓ Benjamin W. Crowninshield (Adams-Clay D-R; Anti-Jacksonian) 58.1%; ▌Frederick Howed (Federalist) 32.0%; Scattering 9.9% |
| Massachusetts 3 "Essex North district" | Jeremiah Nelson | Adams-Clay Federalist | 1804; 1806 (retired); 1814 | Incumbent retired. Anti-Jacksonian hold. | First ballot (November 1, 1824): ▌John Varnum (Adams-Clay Federalist; Anti-Jacksonian) 49.3%; ▌John Merrill (Adams-Clay D-R; Anti-Jacksonian) 48.3%; Scattering 2.5%; Second ballot (January 3, 1825): ▌ ✓ John Varnum (Adams-Clay Federalist; Anti-Jacksonian) 50.2%; ▌John Merrill (Adams-Clay D-R; Anti-Jacksonian) 48.0%; ▌Moses Wingate (Democratic-Republican) 1.0%; Other 0.8% |
| Massachusetts 4 "Middlesex district" | Timothy Fuller | Adams-Clay; Democratic-Republican | 1816 | Incumbent retired. Anti-Jacksonian hold. | ▌ ✓ Edward Everett (Adams-Clay D-R; Anti-Jacksonian) 56.7%; ▌John Keyes (Democratic-Republican) 40.4% |
| Massachusetts 5 "Hampden district" | Samuel Lathrop | Adams-Clay; Federalist | 1819 | Incumbent re-elected as Anti-Jacksonian. | First ballot (November 1, 1824): ▌Samuel Lathrop (Adams-Clay Federalist; Anti-Jacksonian) 48.8%; ▌John Mills (Jackson D-R; Jacksonian) 36.3%; ▌Isaac C. Bates (Adams-Clay Federalist; Anti-Jacksonian) 11.3%; ▌Thomas Shepherd (Democratic-Republican) 3.6%; Second ballot (January 3, 1825): ▌ ✓ Samuel Lathrop (Adams-Clay Federalist; Anti-Jacksonian) 62.2%; ▌John Mills (Jackson D-R; Jacksonian) 37.8%; Third ballot (April 1, 1825) (Note: Although a majority was reached in the second ballot, a third ballot was ordered because elections had not been held in Holland and South Brimfield.): ▌ ✓ Samuel Lathrop (Adams-Clay Federalist; Anti-Jacksonian) 60.9%; ▌John Mills (Jackson D-R; Jacksonian) 39.1% |
| Massachusetts 6 "Franklin district" | Samuel C. Allen | Adams-Clay; Federalist | 1816 | Incumbent re-elected as Anti-Jacksonian. | First ballot (November 1, 1824): ▌George Grennell Jr. (Adams-Clay D-R; Anti-Jacksonian) 46.2%; ▌Samuel C. Allen (Adams-Clay Federalist; Anti-Jacksonian) 44.1%; ▌Eleazer James (Democratic-Republican) 7.6%; Scattering 2.1%; Second ballot (January 3, 1825): ▌ ✓ Samuel C. Allen (Adams-Clay Federalist; Anti-Jacksonian) 55.7%; ▌George Grennell Jr. (Adams-Clay D-R; Anti-Jacksonian) 43.5% |
| Massachusetts 7 "Berkshire district" | Henry W. Dwight | Adams-Clay; Federalist | 1822 | Incumbent re-elected as Anti-Jacksonian. | ▌ ✓ Henry W. Dwight (Adams-Clay Federalist; Anti-Jacksonian) 57.1%; ▌Nathan Willis (Jackson D-R; Jacksonian) 41.1% |
| Massachusetts 8 "Worcester South district" | Jonas Sibley | Adams-Clay; Democratic-Republican | 1823 | Incumbent lost re-election. Anti-Jacksonian hold. | First ballot (November 1, 1824): ▌John Davis (Adams-Clay Federalist; Anti-Jacksonian) 43.4%; ▌Jonas Sibley (Adams-Clay D-R; Anti-Jacksonian) 31.1%; ▌Sumner Barstow (Democratic-Republican) 18.7%; ▌Bezaleel Taft (Federalist) 6.1%; Scattering 0.7%; Second ballot (January 3, 1825): ▌John Davis (Adams-Clay Federalist; Anti-Jacksonian) 47.8%; ▌Jonas Sibley (Adams-Clay D-R; Anti-Jacksonian) 46.8%; ▌Sumner Barstow (Democratic-Republican) 5.4%; Third ballot (April 1, 1825): ▌John Davis (Adams-Clay Federalist; Anti-Jacksonian) 49.8%; ▌Jonas Sibley (Adams-Clay D-R; Anti-Jacksonian) 43.6%; ▌Sumner Barstow (Democratic-Republican) 6.6%; Fourth ballot (August 1, 1825): ▌ ✓ John Davis (Adams-Clay Federalist; Anti-Jacksonian) 51.3%; ▌Jonas Sibley (Adams-Clay D-R; Anti-Jacksonian) 48.3% |
| Massachusetts 9 "Worcester North" | John Locke | Adams-Clay; Federalist | 1820 | Incumbent re-elected as Anti-Jacksonian. | ▌ ✓ John Locke (Adams-Clay Federalist; Anti-Jacksonian) 60.6%; ▌Jonas G. Kendall (Adams-Clay Federalist; Anti-Jacksonian) 16.8%; ▌Eleazer James (Federalist) 14.5%; ▌Samuel Dana (Democratic-Republican) 7.4% |
| Massachusetts 10 "Norfolk district" | John Bailey | Adams-Clay; Democratic-Republican | 1823 (special) | Incumbent re-elected as Anti-Jacksonian. | First ballot (November 1, 1824): ▌John Bailey (Adams-Clay D-R; Anti-Jacksonian) 43.0%; ▌Richard Sullivan (Federalist) 26.4%; ▌Samuel Bugbee (Unknown) 22.4%; ▌Sher Leland (Democratic-Republican) 3.5%; ▌Ebenezer Seaver (Jacksonian) 3.0%; Scattering 1.7%; Third ballot (November 29, 1824): ▌ ✓ John Bailey (Adams-Clay D-R; Anti-Jacksonian) 50.1%; ▌Rufus G. Amory (Unknown) 31.3%; ▌Samuel Bugbee (Unknown) 14.2%; Scattering 4.4% |
| Massachusetts 11 "Plymouth district" | Aaron Hobart | Adams-Clay; Democratic-Republican | 1820 | Incumbent re-elected as Anti-Jacksonian. | ▌ ✓ Aaron Hobart (Adams-Clay D-R; Anti-Jacksonian) 73.4%; ▌Ebenezer Gay (Democratic-Republican) 14.6%; ▌William Baylies (Adams-Clay D-R; Anti-Jacksonian) 12.0% |
| Massachusetts 12 "Bristol district" | Francis Baylies | Jackson; Federalist | 1822 | Incumbent re-elected as Jacksonian. | First ballot (November 1, 1824): ▌Francis Baylies (Jackson Federalist; Jacksonian) 49.3%; ▌James L. Hodges (Adams-Clay D-R; Anti-Jacksonian) 45.8%; Scattering 5.0%; Second ballot (January 3, 1825): ▌ ✓ Francis Baylies (Jackson Federalist; Jacksonian) 54.8%; ▌James L. Hodges (Adams-Clay D-R; Anti-Jacksonian) 42.0% |
| Massachusetts 13 "Barnstable district" | John Reed Jr. | Adams-Clay; Federalist | 1812; 1816 (lost); 1820 | Incumbent re-elected as Anti-Jacksonian. | ▌ ✓ John Reed (Adams-Clay Federalist; Anti-Jacksonian) 58.1%; ▌Barker Burnell (Adams-Clay D-R; Anti-Jacksonian) 25.5%; ▌Walter Folger (Democratic-Republican) 16.4% |

== Michigan Territory ==
See Non-voting delegates, below.

== Mississippi ==
Mississippi elected its member August 2–3, 1824.

| District | Incumbent | | | This race | |
| District | Member | Party | First elected | Results | Candidates |
|---|---|---|---|---|---|
| Mississippi at-large | Christopher Rankin | Jackson; Democratic-Republican | 1819 | Incumbent re-elected as Jacksonian. | ▌ ✓ Christopher Rankin (Jackson D-R; Jacksonian) 98.4%; ▌George Poindexter (Adams-Clay D-R; Anti-Jacksonian) 1.6% |

== Missouri ==
Missouri elected its member August 2, 1824.

| District | Incumbent | | | This race | |
| District | Member | Party | First elected | Results | Candidates |
|---|---|---|---|---|---|
| Missouri at-large | John Scott | Adams-Clay; Democratic-Republican | 1820 | Incumbent re-elected as Anti-Jacksonian. | ▌ ✓ John Scott (Adams-Clay D-R; Anti-Jacksonian) 47.0%; ▌George F. Strother (Jackson D-R; Jacksonian) 42.4%; ▌Robert Wash (Unknown) 10.5% |

== New Hampshire ==
New Hampshire elected its members between November 1, 1824, and March 8, 1825. New Hampshire law required candidates to receive votes from a majority of voters for election. As only five candidates received votes from a majority of voters, a run-off election had to be held for the sixth seat on March 8, 1825.

| District | Incumbent | | | This race | |
| District | Member | Party | First elected | Results | Candidates |
|---|---|---|---|---|---|
| New Hampshire at-large 6 seats on a general ticket | Ichabod Bartlett | Adams-Clay; Democratic-Republican | 1822 | Incumbent re-elected as Anti-Jacksonian. | First ballot (November 1, 1824): ▌ ✓ Ichabod Bartlett (Adams-Clay D-R; Anti-Jacksonian) 17.0%; ▌ ✓ Jonathan Harvey (Jackson D-R; Jacksonian) 12.7%; ▌ ✓ James Miller (Democratic-Republican) 10.2%; ▌ ✓ Nehemiah Eastman (Adams-Clay D-R; Anti-Jacksonian) 10.0%; ▌ ✓ Thomas Whipple Jr. (Adams-Clay D-R; Anti-Jacksonian) 9.0%; ▌ Ezekiel Webster (Adams-Clay D-R; Anti-Jacksonian) 8.7%; ▌ Joseph Healy (Adams-Clay D-R; Anti-Jacksonian) 8.0%; ▌Phinehas Handerson (Adams) 7.8%; ▌Titus Brown (Adams-Clay D-R; Anti-Jacksonian) 7.7%; ▌Daniel C. Atkinson (Independent) 6.9%; ▌Estwicke Evans (Independent) 1.0%; Others 1.2%; Second ballot (March 8, 1825): ▌ ✓ Titus Brown (Adams-Clay D-R; Anti-Jacksonian) 100%; Second ballot (March 8, 1825): ▌ ✓ Joseph Healy (Adams-Clay D-R; Anti-Jacksonian) 56.7%; ▌Ezekiel Webster (Adams-Clay D-R; Anti-Jacksonian) 43.3% |
| New Hampshire at-large 6 seats on a general ticket | Arthur Livermore | Adams-Clay; Democratic-Republican | 1816; 1820 (lost); 1822 | Incumbent lost re-election. Jacksonian gain. | |
| New Hampshire at-large 6 seats on a general ticket | Matthew Harvey | Adams-Clay; Democratic-Republican | 1820 | Incumbent retired. Anti-Jacksonian hold. Winner (Miller) declined to serve, leading to a special election. | |
| New Hampshire at-large 6 seats on a general ticket | Aaron Matson | Adams-Clay; Democratic-Republican | 1820 | Incumbent retired. Anti-Jacksonian hold. | |
| New Hampshire at-large 6 seats on a general ticket | Thomas Whipple Jr. | Adams-Clay; Democratic-Republican | 1820 | Incumbent re-elected as Anti-Jacksonian. | |
| New Hampshire at-large 6 seats on a general ticket | William Plumer Jr. | Adams-Clay; Democratic-Republican | 1818 | Incumbent retired. Anti-Jacksonian hold. | |

== New Jersey ==
New Jersey elected its members November 2, 1824.

| District | Incumbent | | | This race | |
| District | Member | Party | First elected | Results | Candidates |
|---|---|---|---|---|---|
| New Jersey at-large 6 seats on a general ticket | Lewis Condict | Adams-Clay; Democratic-Republican | 1820 | Incumbent re-elected as Anti-Jacksonian. | ▌ ✓ George Holcombe (Jackson D-R; Jacksonian) 16.8%; ▌ ✓ Samuel Swan (Adams-Clay D-R; Anti-Jacksonian) 16.7%; ▌ ✓ Lewis Condict (Adams-Clay D-R; Anti-Jacksonian) 16.7%; ▌ ✓ Daniel Garrison (Jackson D-R; Jacksonian) 16.6%; ▌ ✓ George Cassedy (Jackson D-R; Jacksonian) 16.6%; ▌ ✓ Ebenezer Tucker (Adams-Clay D-R; Anti-Jacksonian) 16.1% |
| New Jersey at-large 6 seats on a general ticket | George Holcombe | Jackson; Democratic-Republican | 1820 | Incumbent re-elected as Jacksonian. | ▌ ✓ George Holcombe (Jackson D-R; Jacksonian) 16.8%; ▌ ✓ Samuel Swan (Adams-Clay D-R; Anti-Jacksonian) 16.7%; ▌ ✓ Lewis Condict (Adams-Clay D-R; Anti-Jacksonian) 16.7%; ▌ ✓ Daniel Garrison (Jackson D-R; Jacksonian) 16.6%; ▌ ✓ George Cassedy (Jackson D-R; Jacksonian) 16.6%; ▌ ✓ Ebenezer Tucker (Adams-Clay D-R; Anti-Jacksonian) 16.1% |
| New Jersey at-large 6 seats on a general ticket | George Cassedy | Jackson; Democratic-Republican | 1820 | Incumbent re-elected as Jacksonian. | ▌ ✓ George Holcombe (Jackson D-R; Jacksonian) 16.8%; ▌ ✓ Samuel Swan (Adams-Clay D-R; Anti-Jacksonian) 16.7%; ▌ ✓ Lewis Condict (Adams-Clay D-R; Anti-Jacksonian) 16.7%; ▌ ✓ Daniel Garrison (Jackson D-R; Jacksonian) 16.6%; ▌ ✓ George Cassedy (Jackson D-R; Jacksonian) 16.6%; ▌ ✓ Ebenezer Tucker (Adams-Clay D-R; Anti-Jacksonian) 16.1% |
| New Jersey at-large 6 seats on a general ticket | Daniel Garrison | Jackson; Democratic-Republican | 1822 | Incumbent re-elected as Jacksonian. | ▌ ✓ George Holcombe (Jackson D-R; Jacksonian) 16.8%; ▌ ✓ Samuel Swan (Adams-Clay D-R; Anti-Jacksonian) 16.7%; ▌ ✓ Lewis Condict (Adams-Clay D-R; Anti-Jacksonian) 16.7%; ▌ ✓ Daniel Garrison (Jackson D-R; Jacksonian) 16.6%; ▌ ✓ George Cassedy (Jackson D-R; Jacksonian) 16.6%; ▌ ✓ Ebenezer Tucker (Adams-Clay D-R; Anti-Jacksonian) 16.1% |
| New Jersey at-large 6 seats on a general ticket | Samuel Swan | Adams-Clay; Democratic-Republican | 1820 | Incumbent re-elected as Anti-Jacksonian. | ▌ ✓ George Holcombe (Jackson D-R; Jacksonian) 16.8%; ▌ ✓ Samuel Swan (Adams-Clay D-R; Anti-Jacksonian) 16.7%; ▌ ✓ Lewis Condict (Adams-Clay D-R; Anti-Jacksonian) 16.7%; ▌ ✓ Daniel Garrison (Jackson D-R; Jacksonian) 16.6%; ▌ ✓ George Cassedy (Jackson D-R; Jacksonian) 16.6%; ▌ ✓ Ebenezer Tucker (Adams-Clay D-R; Anti-Jacksonian) 16.1% |
| New Jersey at-large 6 seats on a general ticket | James Matlack | Adams-Clay; Democratic-Republican | 1820 | Incumbent retired. Anti-Jacksonian hold. | ▌ ✓ George Holcombe (Jackson D-R; Jacksonian) 16.8%; ▌ ✓ Samuel Swan (Adams-Clay D-R; Anti-Jacksonian) 16.7%; ▌ ✓ Lewis Condict (Adams-Clay D-R; Anti-Jacksonian) 16.7%; ▌ ✓ Daniel Garrison (Jackson D-R; Jacksonian) 16.6%; ▌ ✓ George Cassedy (Jackson D-R; Jacksonian) 16.6%; ▌ ✓ Ebenezer Tucker (Adams-Clay D-R; Anti-Jacksonian) 16.1% |

== New York ==
New York elected its members November 1–3, 1824.

During this time in New York politics, two factions of the Democratic-Republicans existed: the Bucktails, opponents of Governor DeWitt Clinton, and the Clintonians, supporters of Clinton. The Bucktails were led by Martin Van Buren, who supported Crawford in the 1824 presidential election, though many members were not united in this support, especially after Crawford's debilitating stroke. In the contingency election, Van Buren was outmaneuvered by Clay and Adams, and the political machine he had worked to build broke down. Less than a year after this defeat, Van Buren restored unity within the Bucktail faction and shifted his support to Jackson.

Data source only states each candidate's political faction. For party affiliation the US House history, arts, and archive is used.

| District | Incumbent | | | This race | |
| District | Member | Party | First elected | Results | Candidates |
|---|---|---|---|---|---|
| New York 1 | Silas Wood | Clintonian; Federalist | 1818 | Incumbent re-elected as Anti-Jacksonian. | ▌ ✓ Silas Wood (Clintonian; Anti-Jacksonian) 60.5%; ▌James Lent (Bucktail; Jacksonian) 39.5% |
| New York 2 | Jacob Tyson | Bucktail; Democratic-Republican | 1822 | Incumbent retired. Anti-Jacksonian gain. | ▌ ✓ Joshua Sands (Clintonian; Anti-Jacksonian) 53.1%; ▌John T. Bergen (Bucktail; Jacksonian) 46.9% |
| New York 3 Plural district with 3 seats | Churchill C. Cambreleng | Bucktail; Democratic-Republican | 1821 | Incumbent re-elected as Jacksonian. Jacksonian gain. | ▌ ✓ Churchill C. Cambreleng (Bucktail; Jacksonian) 20.8%; ▌ ✓ Gulian C. Verplanck (Bucktail; Jacksonian) 17.7%; ▌ ✓ Jeromus Johnson (Bucktail; Jacksonian) 16.7%; ▌John Rathbone (Clintonian) 14.5%; ▌Charles G. Haines (Clintonian) 14.0%; ▌Peter Sharpe (Clintonian; Anti-Jacksonian) 13.6%; ▌Henry Wheaton (Independent) 2.7% |
| New York 3 Plural district with 3 seats | Peter Sharpe | Clintonian; Democratic-Republican | 1822 | Incumbent lost re-election. Jacksonian gain. | ▌ ✓ Churchill C. Cambreleng (Bucktail; Jacksonian) 20.8%; ▌ ✓ Gulian C. Verplanck (Bucktail; Jacksonian) 17.7%; ▌ ✓ Jeromus Johnson (Bucktail; Jacksonian) 16.7%; ▌John Rathbone (Clintonian) 14.5%; ▌Charles G. Haines (Clintonian) 14.0%; ▌Peter Sharpe (Clintonian; Anti-Jacksonian) 13.6%; ▌Henry Wheaton (Independent) 2.7% |
| New York 3 Plural district with 3 seats | John J. Morgan | Bucktail; Democratic-Republican | 1821 | Incumbent retired. Jacksonian hold. | ▌ ✓ Churchill C. Cambreleng (Bucktail; Jacksonian) 20.8%; ▌ ✓ Gulian C. Verplanck (Bucktail; Jacksonian) 17.7%; ▌ ✓ Jeromus Johnson (Bucktail; Jacksonian) 16.7%; ▌John Rathbone (Clintonian) 14.5%; ▌Charles G. Haines (Clintonian) 14.0%; ▌Peter Sharpe (Clintonian; Anti-Jacksonian) 13.6%; ▌Henry Wheaton (Independent) 2.7% |
| New York 4 | Joel Frost | Bucktail; Democratic-Republican | 1822 | Incumbent retired. Anti-Jacksonian gain. | ▌ ✓ Aaron Ward (Clintonian; Anti-Jacksonian) 38.9%; ▌Jonathan Ward (Independent) 31.8%; ▌John Hunter (Bucktail) 29.1% |
| New York 5 | William W. Van Wyck | Bucktail; Democratic-Republican | 1821 | Incumbent retired. Anti-Jacksonian hold. | ▌ ✓ Bartow White (Clintonian; Anti-Jacksonian) 52.8%; ▌Peter Livingston (Bucktail) 47.2% |
| New York 6 | Hector Craig | Clintonian; Democratic-Republican | 1822 | Incumbent lost re-election. Jacksonian hold. | ▌ ✓ John Hallock Jr. (Bucktail; Jacksonian) 47.2%; ▌Hector Craig (Clintonian; Jacksonian) 44.4%; ▌Walter Case (Independent Republican) 8.4% |
| New York 7 | Lemuel Jenkins | Bucktail; Democratic-Republican | 1822 | Incumbent retired. Anti-Jacksonian gain. | ▌ ✓ Abraham B. Hasbrouck (Clintonian; Anti-Jacksonian) 51.2%; ▌John Lounsberry (Bucktail) 48.8% |
| New York 8 | James Strong | Clintonian Federalist | 1818; 1821 (retired); 1822 | Incumbent re-elected as Anti-Jacksonian. | ▌ ✓ James Strong (Clintonian; Anti-Jacksonian) 60.0%; ▌Robert Livingston (Bucktail Federalist) 40.0% |
| New York 9 | James L. Hogeboom | Bucktail; Democratic-Republican | 1822 | Incumbent retired. Anti-Jacksonian gain. | ▌ ✓ William McManus (Clintonian; Anti-Jacksonian) 56.6%; ▌George R. Davis (Bucktail) 43.5% |
| New York 10 | Stephen Van Rensselaer | Clintonian; Democratic-Republican | 1822 (special) | Incumbent re-elected as Anti-Jacksonian. | ▌ ✓ Stephen Van Rensselaer (Clintonian; Anti-Jacksonian) 99.6% |
| New York 11 | Charles A. Foote | Bucktail; Democratic-Republican | 1822 | Incumbent retired. Jacksonian gain. | ▌ ✓ Henry Ashley (Bucktail; Jacksonian) 57.4%; ▌William V. B. Heermance (Clintonian) 41.5%; ▌Amos Hamlin (Independent) 1.1% |
| New York 12 | Lewis Eaton | Bucktail; Democratic-Republican | 1822 | Incumbent retired. Jacksonian gain. | ▌ ✓ William Dietz (Bucktail; Jacksonian) 56.2%; ▌Constant Brown (Clintonian) 42.5% |
| New York 13 | Isaac Williams Jr. | Bucktail; Democratic-Republican | 1812; 1814 (retired); 1816; 1818 (retired); 1822 | Incumbent retired. Jacksonian gain. | ▌ ✓ William G. Angel (Bucktail; Jacksonian) 58.8%; ▌William Campbell (Clintonian) 41.0% |
| New York 14 | Henry R. Storrs | Clintonian Federalist | 1816; 1821 (retired); 1822 | Incumbent re-elected as Anti-Jacksonian. | ▌ ✓ Henry R. Storrs (Clintonian; Anti-Jacksonian) 56.9%; ▌James Lynch (Bucktail) 42.5% |
| New York 15 | John Herkimer | Clintonian; Democratic-Republican | 1816; 1818 (retired); 1822 | Incumbent lost re-election. Jacksonian gain. | ▌ ✓ Michael Hoffman (Bucktail; Jacksonian) 52.7%; ▌John Herkimer (Clintonian; Anti-Jacksonian) 47.3% |
| New York 16 | John W. Cady | Clintonian; Democratic-Republican | 1822 | Incumbent retired. Anti-Jacksonian hold. | ▌ ✓ Henry Markell (Clintonian; Anti-Jacksonian) 54.8%; ▌William Dodge (Bucktail) 45.1% |
| New York 17 | John W. Taylor | Clintonian; Democratic-Republican | 1812 | Incumbent re-elected as Anti-Jacksonian. | ▌ ✓ John W. Taylor (Clintonian; Anti-Jacksonian) 99.0% |
| New York 18 | Henry C. Martindale | Clintonian Federalist | 1822 | Incumbent re-elected as Anti-Jacksonian. | ▌ ✓ Henry C. Martindale (Clintonian; Anti-Jacksonian) 64.5%; ▌John Gale (Bucktail) 35.4% |
| New York 19 | John Richards | Bucktail; Democratic-Republican | 1822 | Incumbent retired. Anti-Jacksonian gain. | ▌ ✓ Henry H. Ross (Clintonian; Anti-Jacksonian) 52.0%; ▌William Hogan (Bucktail) 47.5% |
| New York 20 Plural district with 2 seats | Ela Collins | Bucktail; Democratic-Republican | 1822 | Incumbent retired. Anti-Jacksonian gain. | ▌ ✓ Nicoll Fosdick (Clintonian; Anti-Jacksonian) 25.5%; ▌ ✓ Egbert Ten Eyck (Bucktail; Jacksonian) 24.6% (Note: In New York's 20th district, Egbert Ten Eyck (Jacksonian) was initially declared the winner of the second seat. However, Daniel Hugunin Jr. (Anti-Jacksonian) successfully contested the election on the basis that 275 votes had been certified for "Daniel Hugunin, Junior" and another 195 for "Daniel Hugunin," and that those votes were intended for him. The House Committee on Elections concurred and the seat was awarded to Hugunin, who was seated December 15, 1825.); ▌Horace Allen (Bucktail) 24.5%; ▌Daniel Hugunin Jr. (Clintonian; Anti-Jacksonian) 23.3%; "Daniel Hugunin, Junior" 1.2%; "Daniel Hugunin" 0.9% |
| New York 20 Plural district with 2 seats | Egbert Ten Eyck | Bucktail; Democratic-Republican | 1822 | Incumbent re-elected as Jacksonian. | ▌ ✓ Nicoll Fosdick (Clintonian; Anti-Jacksonian) 25.5%; ▌ ✓ Egbert Ten Eyck (Bucktail; Jacksonian) 24.6%; ▌Horace Allen (Bucktail) 24.5%; ▌Daniel Hugunin Jr. (Clintonian; Anti-Jacksonian) 23.3%; "Daniel Hugunin, Junior" 1.2%; "Daniel Hugunin" 0.9% |
| New York 20 Plural district with 2 seats | Egbert Ten Eyck | Bucktail; Democratic-Republican | 1822 | Election successfully contested. Anti-Jacksonian gain. | ▌ ✓ Daniel Hugunin Jr. (Clintonian; Anti-Jacksonian) 25.3%; ▌Egbert Ten Eyck (Bucktail; Jacksonian) 24.5% |
| New York 21 | Lot Clark | Bucktail; Democratic-Republican | 1822 | Incumbent lost re-election. Anti-Jacksonian gain. | ▌ ✓ Elias Whitmore (Clintonian; Anti-Jacksonian) 50.4%; ▌Lot Clark (Bucktail; Jacksonian) 49.5% |
| New York 22 | Justin Dwinell | Bucktail; Democratic-Republican | 1822 | Incumbent retired. Anti-Jacksonian gain. | ▌ ✓ John Miller (Clintonian; Anti-Jacksonian) 54.3%; ▌John Lynde (Bucktail) 45.7% |
| New York 23 | Elisha Litchfield | Bucktail; Democratic-Republican | 1821 | Incumbent lost re-election. Anti-Jacksonian gain. | ▌ ✓ Luther Badger (Clintonian; Anti-Jacksonian) 50.8%; ▌Elisha Litchfield (Bucktail; Jacksonian) 49.2% |
| New York 24 | Rowland Day | Bucktail; Democratic-Republican | 1822 | Incumbent lost re-election. Jacksonian gain. | ▌ ✓ Charles Kellogg (Clintonian; Jacksonian) 53.1%; ▌Rowland Day (Bucktail) 46.9% |
| New York 25 | Samuel Lawrence | Clintonian; Democratic-Republican | 1822 | Incumbent retired. Anti-Jacksonian hold. | ▌ ✓ Charles Humphrey (Clintonian; Anti-Jacksonian) 51.0%; ▌David Woodcock (Bucktail) 48.7% |
| New York 26 Plural district with 2 seats | Dudley Marvin | Clintonian; Democratic-Republican | 1822 | Incumbent re-elected as Anti-Jacksonian. | ▌ ✓ Dudley Marvin (Clintonian; Anti-Jacksonian) 40.9%; ▌ ✓ Robert S. Rose (Clintonian; Anti-Jacksonian) 24.0%; ▌John Maynard (Bucktail) 21.7%; ▌Aaron Remer (Bucktail) 13.4% |
| New York 26 Plural district with 2 seats | Robert S. Rose | Clintonian; Democratic-Republican | 1822 | Incumbent re-elected as Anti-Jacksonian. | ▌ ✓ Dudley Marvin (Clintonian; Anti-Jacksonian) 40.9%; ▌ ✓ Robert S. Rose (Clintonian; Anti-Jacksonian) 24.0%; ▌John Maynard (Bucktail) 21.7%; ▌Aaron Remer (Bucktail) 13.4% |
| New York 27 | Moses Hayden | Clintonian; Democratic-Republican | 1822 | Incumbent re-elected as Anti-Jacksonian. | ▌ ✓ Moses Hayden (Clintonian; Anti-Jacksonian) 59.3%; ▌Charles H. Carroll (Bucktail) 40.3% |
| New York 28 | William Woods | Bucktail; Democratic-Republican | 1823 (special) | Incumbent lost re-election. Anti-Jacksonian hold. | ▌ ✓ Timothy Porter (Clintonian; Anti-Jacksonian) 35.3%; ▌William Woods (Bucktail; Anti-Jacksonian) 32.6%; ▌Daniel Cruger (Clintonian) 28.5%; ▌Philip Church (Independent) 3.5% |
| New York 29 | Parmenio Adams | Clintonian; Democratic-Republican | 1822 | Incumbent re-elected as Anti-Jacksonian. | ▌ ✓ Parmenio Adams (Clintonian; Anti-Jacksonian) 57.6%; ▌Isaac Wilson (Bucktail) 42.3% |
| New York 30 | Albert H. Tracy | Clintonian; Democratic-Republican | 1818 | Incumbent retired. Anti-Jacksonian hold. | ▌ ✓ Daniel Garnsey (Bucktail; Anti-Jacksonian) 35.3%; ▌William Hotchkiss (Clintonian) 33.0%; ▌John G. Camp (Bucktail) 31.4% |

== North Carolina ==
North Carolina elected its members August 11, 1825, after the term began but before the new Congress convened.

This election saw the brief rise of two regional factions within the Democratic-Republican Party: the Caucus and Anti-Caucus factions. The Anti-Caucus faction was opposed the existing nomination process, which included closed meetings, conventions, and caucuses, and ran candidates against incumbents who had been nominated by such systems.

Data source only states each candidate's political faction. For party affiliation the US House history, arts, and archive is used.

| District | Incumbent | | | This race | |
| District | Member | Party | First elected | Results | Candidates |
|---|---|---|---|---|---|
| North Carolina 1 | Alfred M. Gatlin | Crawford; Democratic-Republican | 1823 | Incumbent lost re-election. Jacksonian gain. | ▌ ✓ Lemuel Sawyer (Anti-Caucus; Jacksonian) 59.8%; ▌Alfred M. Gatlin (Caucus) 40.2% |
| North Carolina 2 | George Outlaw | Crawford; Democratic-Republican | 1825 (special) | Incumbent lost re-election. Jacksonian gain. | ▌ ✓ Willis Alston (Anti-Caucus; Jacksonian) 42.1%; ▌George Outlaw (Caucus) 31.2%; ▌James Grant (Anti-Caucus) 26.7% |
| North Carolina 3 | Thomas H. Hall | Crawford; Democratic-Republican | 1817 | Incumbent lost re-election. Jacksonian gain. | ▌ ✓ Richard Hines (Anti-Caucus; Jacksonian) 52.7%; ▌Thomas H. Hall (Caucus) 47.3% |
| North Carolina 4 | Richard D. Spaight Jr. | Crawford; Democratic-Republican | 1823 | Incumbent lost re-election. Jacksonian gain. | ▌ ✓ John H. Bryan (Anti-Caucus; Jacksonian) 51.0%; ▌Richard D. Spaight Jr. (Caucus) 49.0% |
| North Carolina 5 | Charles Hooks | Crawford; Democratic-Republican | 1816 (special); 1817 (lost); 1819 | Incumbent lost re-election. Jacksonian gain. | ▌ ✓ Gabriel Holmes (Anti-Caucus; Jacksonian) 62.8%; ▌Charles Hooks (Caucus) 37.2% |
| North Carolina 6 | Weldon N. Edwards | Crawford; Democratic-Republican | 1816 (special) | Incumbent re-elected as Jacksonian. Jacksonian gain. | ▌ ✓ Weldon N. Edwards (Caucus; Jacksonian) 100%; Uncontested |
| North Carolina 7 | John Culpepper | Adams-Clay Federalist | 1806; 1808 (contest); 1808 (special); 1813; 1816 (lost); 1819; 1821 (lost); 1823 | Incumbent lost re-election. Jacksonian gain. | ▌ ✓ Archibald McNeill (Anti-Caucus; Jacksonian) 51.5%; ▌John Culpepper (Caucus; Anti-Jacksonian) 48.5% |
| North Carolina 8 | Willie P. Mangum | Crawford; Democratic-Republican | 1823 | Incumbent re-elected as Jacksonian. Jacksonian gain. | ▌ ✓ Willie P. Mangum (Caucus; Jacksonian) 50.6%; ▌Josiah Crudup (Anti-Caucus) 49.4% |
| North Carolina 9 | Romulus M. Saunders | Crawford; Democratic-Republican | 1821 | Incumbent re-elected as Jacksonian. Jacksonian gain. | ▌ ✓ Romulus M. Saunders (Caucus; Jacksonian) 59.0%; Scattering 41.0% |
| North Carolina 10 | John Long | Crawford; Democratic-Republican | 1821 | Incumbent re-elected as Anti-Jacksonian. Anti-Jacksonian gain. | ▌ ✓ John Long (Caucus; Anti-Jacksonian) 52.9%; ▌John Giles (Anti-Caucus) 47.1% |
| North Carolina 11 | Henry W. Connor | Jackson; Democratic-Republican | 1821 | Incumbent re-elected as Jacksonian. | ▌ ✓ Henry W. Connor (Anti-Caucus; Jacksonian) 90.2%; ▌Thomas T. Hunt (Adams-Clay; Anti-Jacksonian) 8.4% |
| North Carolina 12 | Robert B. Vance | Jackson; Democratic-Republican | 1823 | Incumbent lost re-election. Jacksonian hold. | ▌ ✓ Samuel P. Carson (Anti-Caucus; Jacksonian) 35.2%; ▌Robert B. Vance (Caucus; Jacksonian) 32.6%; ▌James Graham (Anti-Caucus; Anti-Jacksonian) 32.2% |
| North Carolina 13 | Lewis Williams | Crawford; Democratic-Republican | 1815 | Incumbent re-elected as Anti-Jacksonian. Anti-Jacksonian gain. | ▌ ✓ Lewis Williams (Caucus; Anti-Jacksonian) 62.0%; ▌Meshack Franklin (Anti-Caucus) 38.0% |

== Ohio ==
Ohio elected its members October 12, 1824.

| District | Incumbent | | | This race | |
| District | Member | Party | First elected | Results | Candidates |
|---|---|---|---|---|---|
| Ohio 1 | James W. Gazlay | Jackson; Democratic-Republican | 1822 | Incumbent lost re-election. Jacksonian hold. | ▌ ✓ James Findlay (Jackson D-R; Jacksonian) 37.2%; ▌James W. Gazlay (Jackson D-R; Jacksonian) 36.6%; ▌David Morris (Adams-Clay D-R; Anti-Jacksonian) 20.0%; ▌Benjamin Piatt (Unknown) 6.1% |
| Ohio 2 | Thomas R. Ross | Crawford; Democratic-Republican | 1818 | Incumbent lost re-election. Anti-Jacksonian gain. | ▌ ✓ John Woods (Adams-Clay D-R; Anti-Jacksonian) 55.6%; ▌Thomas R. Ross (Crawford D-R) 44.4% |
| Ohio 3 | William McLean | Adams-Clay; Democratic-Republican | 1822 | Incumbent re-elected as Anti-Jacksonian. | ▌ ✓ William McLean (Adams-Clay D-R; Anti-Jacksonian) 80.1%; ▌James Riley (Unknown) 19.9% |
| Ohio 4 | Joseph Vance | Adams-Clay; Democratic-Republican | 1820 | Incumbent re-elected as Anti-Jacksonian. | ▌ ✓ Joseph Vance (Adams-Clay D-R; Anti-Jacksonian) 99.6% |
| Ohio 5 | John W. Campbell | Jackson; Democratic-Republican | 1816 | Incumbent switched factions and re-elected as Anti-Jacksonian. Anti-Jacksonian gain. | ▌ ✓ John W. Campbell (Adams-Clay D-R; Anti-Jacksonian) 100%; Uncontested |
| Ohio 6 | Duncan McArthur | Adams-Clay; Democratic-Republican | 1812; 1813 (resigned); 1822 | Incumbent lost re-election. Jacksonian gain. | ▌ ✓ John Thomson (Jackson D-R; Jacksonian) 56.0%; ▌Duncan McArthur (Adams-Clay D-R; Anti-Jacksonian) 44.0% |
| Ohio 7 | Samuel F. Vinton | Adams-Clay; Democratic-Republican | 1822 | Incumbent re-elected as Anti-Jacksonian. | ▌ ✓ Samuel F. Vinton (Adams-Clay D-R; Anti-Jacksonian) 78.3%; ▌Levi Barber (Democratic-Republican) 21.7% |
| Ohio 8 | William Wilson | Crawford; Democratic-Republican | 1822 | Incumbent switched factions and re-elected as Anti-Jacksonian. Anti-Jacksonian gain. | ▌ ✓ William Wilson (Adams-Clay D-R; Anti-Jacksonian) 62.3%; ▌Orris Parish (Democratic-Republican) 37.7% |
| Ohio 9 | Philemon Beecher | Adams-Clay; Democratic-Republican | 1816; 1820 (lost); 1822 | Incumbent re-elected as Anti-Jacksonian. | ▌ ✓ Philemon Beecher (Adams-Clay D-R; Anti-Jacksonian) 40.5%; ▌David Chambers (Adams-Clay D-R; Anti-Jacksonian) 33.4%; ▌William W. Irvin (Jacksonian) 19.6%; ▌Robert MacConnel (Democratic-Republican) 6.6% |
| Ohio 10 | John Patterson | Adams-Clay; Democratic-Republican | 1822 | Incumbent lost re-election. Anti-Jacksonian hold. | ▌ ✓ David Jennings (Adams-Clay D-R; Anti-Jacksonian) 54.5%; ▌John Patterson (Adams-Clay D-R; Anti-Jacksonian) 45.5% |
| Ohio 11 | John C. Wright | Adams-Clay; Democratic-Republican | 1822 | Incumbent re-elected as Anti-Jacksonian. | ▌ ✓ John C. Wright (Adams-Clay D-R; Anti-Jacksonian) 62.8%; ▌Walter B. Bebee (Unknown) 37.1% |
| Ohio 12 | John Sloane | Adams-Clay; Democratic-Republican | 1818 | Incumbent re-elected as Anti-Jacksonian. | ▌ ✓ John Sloane (Adams-Clay D-R; Anti-Jacksonian) 57.8%; ▌Joseph Richardson (Unknown) 42.2% |
| Ohio 13 | Elisha Whittlesey | Adams-Clay; Democratic-Republican | 1822 | Incumbent re-elected as Anti-Jacksonian. | ▌ ✓ Elisha Whittlesey (Adams-Clay D-R; Anti-Jacksonian) 68.2%; ▌Eli Baldwin (Democratic-Republican) 30.5%; Scattering 1.3% |
| Ohio 14 | Mordecai Bartley | Adams-Clay; Democratic-Republican | 1822 | Incumbent re-elected as Anti-Jacksonian. | ▌ ✓ Mordecai Bartley (Adams-Clay D-R; Anti-Jacksonian) 36.7%; ▌Alfred Kelly (Democratic-Republican) 34.3%; ▌Eleutheros Cooke (Unknown) 28.9% |

== Pennsylvania ==
Pennsylvania elected its members October 12, 1824.

| District | Incumbent | | | This race | |
| District | Member | Party | First elected | Results | Candidates |
|---|---|---|---|---|---|
| Pennsylvania 1 | Samuel Breck | Adams-Clay Federalist | 1822 | Incumbent retired. Jacksonian gain. | ▌ ✓ John Wurts (Jackson Federalist; Jacksonian) 52.1%; ▌Joel B. Sutherland (Democratic-Republican) 47.9% |
| Pennsylvania 2 | Joseph Hemphill | Jackson Federalist | 1800; 1802 (lost); 1818 | Incumbent re-elected as Jacksonian. | ▌ ✓ Joseph Hemphill (Jackson Federalist; Jacksonian) 57.5%; ▌William J. Duane (Democratic-Republican) 42.5% |
| Pennsylvania 3 | Daniel H. Miller | Jackson; Democratic-Republican | 1822 | Incumbent re-elected as Jacksonian. | ▌ ✓ Daniel H. Miller (Jackson D-R; Jacksonian) 55.8%; ▌Stephen Duncan (Federalist) 30.4%; ▌Jacob Shearer (Democratic-Republican) 13.8% |
| Pennsylvania 4 Plural district with 3 seats | James Buchanan | Jackson Federalist | 1820 | Incumbent re-elected as Jacksonian. | ▌ ✓ James Buchanan (Jackson Federalist; Jacksonian) 18.0%; ▌ ✓ Samuel Edwards (Jackson Federalist; Jacksonian) 17.5%; ▌ ✓ Charles Miner (Adams-Clay Federalist; Anti-Jacksonian) 17.4%; ▌Isaac D. Barnard (Jackson D-R; Jacksonian) 15.8%; ▌William Anderson (Democratic-Republican) 15.7%; ▌Samuel Houston (Democratic-Republican) 15.5% |
| Pennsylvania 4 Plural district with 3 seats | Samuel Edwards | Jackson Federalist | 1818 | Incumbent re-elected as Jacksonian. | ▌ ✓ James Buchanan (Jackson Federalist; Jacksonian) 18.0%; ▌ ✓ Samuel Edwards (Jackson Federalist; Jacksonian) 17.5%; ▌ ✓ Charles Miner (Adams-Clay Federalist; Anti-Jacksonian) 17.4%; ▌Isaac D. Barnard (Jackson D-R; Jacksonian) 15.8%; ▌William Anderson (Democratic-Republican) 15.7%; ▌Samuel Houston (Democratic-Republican) 15.5% |
| Pennsylvania 4 Plural district with 3 seats | Isaac Wayne | Jackson Federalist | 1822 | Incumbent retired. Anti-Jacksonian gain. | ▌ ✓ James Buchanan (Jackson Federalist; Jacksonian) 18.0%; ▌ ✓ Samuel Edwards (Jackson Federalist; Jacksonian) 17.5%; ▌ ✓ Charles Miner (Adams-Clay Federalist; Anti-Jacksonian) 17.4%; ▌Isaac D. Barnard (Jackson D-R; Jacksonian) 15.8%; ▌William Anderson (Democratic-Republican) 15.7%; ▌Samuel Houston (Democratic-Republican) 15.5% |
| Pennsylvania 5 | Philip S. Markley | Jackson; Democratic-Republican | 1822 | Incumbent switched factions and re-elected as Anti-Jacksonian. Anti-Jacksonian gain. | ▌ ✓ Philip S. Markley (Adams-Clay D-R; Anti-Jacksonian); Uncontested |
| Pennsylvania 6 | Robert Harris | Jackson; Democratic-Republican | 1822 | Incumbent re-elected as Jacksonian. | ▌ ✓ Robert Harris (Jackson D-R; Jacksonian) 62.7%; ▌Christian Gleim (Federalist) 37.3% |
| Pennsylvania 7 Plural district with 2 seats | Daniel Udree | Jackson; Democratic-Republican | 1813 (special); 1822 (special) | Incumbent retired. Jacksonian hold. | ▌ ✓ William Addams (Jackson D-R; Jacksonian) 32.7%; ▌ ✓ Henry Wilson (Jackson D-R; Jacksonian) 32.1%; ▌George Keck (Federalist) 18.0%; ▌Daniel Rose (Federalist) 17.3% |
| Pennsylvania 7 Plural district with 2 seats | Henry Wilson | Jackson; Democratic-Republican | 1822 | Incumbent re-elected as Jacksonian. | ▌ ✓ William Addams (Jackson D-R; Jacksonian) 32.7%; ▌ ✓ Henry Wilson (Jackson D-R; Jacksonian) 32.1%; ▌George Keck (Federalist) 18.0%; ▌Daniel Rose (Federalist) 17.3% |
| Pennsylvania 8 Plural district with 2 seats | Samuel D. Ingham | Jackson; Democratic-Republican | 1812; 1818 (resigned); 1822 (special) | Incumbent re-elected as Jacksonian. | ▌ ✓ Samuel D. Ingham (Jackson D-R; Jacksonian) 50.1%; ▌ ✓ George Wolf (Jackson D-R; Jacksonian) 49.9% |
| Pennsylvania 8 Plural district with 2 seats | Thomas Jones Rogers | Jackson; Democratic-Republican | 1818 (special) | Incumbent resigned April 20, 1824. Jacksonian hold. Winner also elected to the next term. | ▌ ✓ Samuel D. Ingham (Jackson D-R; Jacksonian) 50.1%; ▌ ✓ George Wolf (Jackson D-R; Jacksonian) 49.9% |
| Pennsylvania 9 Plural district with 3 seats | Samuel McKean | Jackson; Democratic-Republican | 1822 | Incumbent re-elected as Jacksonian. | ▌ ✓ Samuel McKean (Jackson D-R; Jacksonian) 31.2%; ▌ ✓ George Kremer (Jackson D-R; Jacksonian) 30.9%; ▌ ✓ Espy Van Horne (Jackson D-R; Jacksonian) 21.3%; ▌William Cox Ellis (Independent D-R) 16.6% |
| Pennsylvania 9 Plural district with 3 seats | George Kremer | Jackson; Democratic-Republican | 1822 | Incumbent re-elected as Jacksonian. | ▌ ✓ Samuel McKean (Jackson D-R; Jacksonian) 31.2%; ▌ ✓ George Kremer (Jackson D-R; Jacksonian) 30.9%; ▌ ✓ Espy Van Horne (Jackson D-R; Jacksonian) 21.3%; ▌William Cox Ellis (Independent D-R) 16.6% |
| Pennsylvania 9 Plural district with 3 seats | William Cox Ellis | Jackson Federalist | 1820; 1821 (resigned); 1822 | Incumbent lost re-election as an Independent. New member elected. | ▌ ✓ Samuel McKean (Jackson D-R; Jacksonian) 31.2%; ▌ ✓ George Kremer (Jackson D-R; Jacksonian) 30.9%; ▌ ✓ Espy Van Horne (Jackson D-R; Jacksonian) 21.3%; ▌William Cox Ellis (Independent D-R) 16.6% |
| Pennsylvania 10 | James S. Mitchell | Jackson; Democratic-Republican | 1820 | Incumbent re-elected as Jacksonian. | ▌ ✓ James S. Mitchell (Jackson D-R; Jacksonian); Uncontested |
| Pennsylvania 11 Plural district with 2 seats | James Wilson | Jackson; Democratic-Republican | 1822 | Incumbent switched factions and re-elected as Anti-Jacksonian. Anti-Jacksonian gain. | ▌ ✓ James Wilson (Adams-Clay D-R; Anti-Jacksonian) 48.2%; ▌ ✓ John Findlay (Jackson D-R; Jacksonian) 46.2%; Scattering 5.6% |
| Pennsylvania 11 Plural district with 2 seats | John Findlay | Jackson; Democratic-Republican | 1821 (special) | Incumbent re-elected as Jacksonian. | ▌ ✓ James Wilson (Adams-Clay D-R; Anti-Jacksonian) 48.2%; ▌ ✓ John Findlay (Jackson D-R; Jacksonian) 46.2%; Scattering 5.6% |
| Pennsylvania 12 | John Brown | Jackson; Democratic-Republican | 1820 | Incumbent lost re-election. Jacksonian hold. | ▌ ✓ John Mitchell (Jackson D-R; Jacksonian) 37.1%; ▌John Brown (Jackson D-R; Jacksonian) 35.9%; ▌Robert Allison ("Old School") 26.9% |
| Pennsylvania 13 | John Tod | Jackson; Democratic-Republican | 1820 | Incumbent resigned sometime in 1824. Jacksonian hold. Successor also elected the same day to the next term. | ▌ ✓ Alexander Thomson (Jackson D-R; Jacksonian); Uncontested |
| Pennsylvania 14 | Andrew Stewart | Jackson; Democratic-Republican | 1820 | Incumbent re-elected as Jacksonian. | ▌ ✓ Andrew Stewart (Jackson D-R; Jacksonian); Uncontested |
| Pennsylvania 15 | Thomas Patterson | Jackson; Democratic-Republican | 1816 | Incumbent retired. Anti-Jacksonian gain. | ▌ ✓ Joseph Lawrence (Adams-Clay D-R; Anti-Jacksonian); Uncontested |
| Pennsylvania 16 Plural district with 2 seats | James Allison Jr. | Jackson; Democratic-Republican | 1822 | Incumbent re-elected as Jacksonian. | ▌ ✓ James Allison Jr. (Jackson D-R; Jacksonian) 22.0%; ▌ ✓ James S. Stevenson (Caucus Republican; Jacksonian) 21.9%; ▌Robert Moore (Caucus Republican) 19.4%; ▌Walter Forward (Jackson D-R; Jacksonian) 18.0%; ▌John Negley (Independent) 9.7%; ▌George Sutton (Independent) 8.9% |
| Pennsylvania 16 Plural district with 2 seats | Walter Forward | Jackson; Democratic-Republican | 1822 (special) | Incumbent lost re-election. Jacksonian hold. | ▌ ✓ James Allison Jr. (Jackson D-R; Jacksonian) 22.0%; ▌ ✓ James S. Stevenson (Caucus Republican; Jacksonian) 21.9%; ▌Robert Moore (Caucus Republican) 19.4%; ▌Walter Forward (Jackson D-R; Jacksonian) 18.0%; ▌John Negley (Independent) 9.7%; ▌George Sutton (Independent) 8.9% |
| Pennsylvania 17 | George Plumer | Jackson; Democratic-Republican | 1820 | Incumbent re-elected as Jacksonian. | ▌ ✓ George Plumer (Jackson D-R; Jacksonian) 58.3%; ▌Jonathan H. Wise (Federalist) 41.7% |
| Pennsylvania 18 | Patrick Farrelly | Jackson; Democratic-Republican | 1820 | Incumbent re-elected as Jacksonian. | ▌ ✓ Patrick Farrelly (Jackson D-R; Jacksonian) 80.5%; ▌Samuel Williamson (Independent D-R) 19.5% |

== Rhode Island ==
Rhode Island elected its members August 30, 1825, after the term began but before the new Congress convened. Rhode Island law required a candidate receive votes from a majority of voters for election. As only one candidate received a majority in this election, a second election was held for the remaining seat.

| District | Incumbent | | | This race | |
| District | Member | Party | First elected | Results | Candidates |
|---|---|---|---|---|---|
| Rhode Island at-large 2 seats on a general ticket | Samuel Eddy | Adams-Clay; Democratic-Republican | 1818 | Incumbent lost re-election. Anti-Jacksonianhold. | First ballot (August 30, 1825): ▌ ✓ Tristam Burges (Adams-Clay D-R; Anti-Jacksonian) 27.8%; ▌ Dutee J. Pearce (Adams-Clay D-R; Anti-Jacksonian) 24.0%; ▌ Job Durfee (Adams-Clay D-R; Anti-Jacksonian) 23.4%; ▌Samuel Eddy (Adams-Clay D-R; Anti-Jacksonian) 20.1%; ▌William Hunter (Democratic-Republican) 3.5%; Others 1.3%; Second ballot (November 25, 1825): ▌ ✓ Dutee J. Pearce (Adams-Clay D-R; Anti-Jacksonian) 56.9%; ▌Job Durfee (Adams-Clay D-R; Anti-Jacksonian) 43.0%; Scattering 0.1% |
| Rhode Island at-large 2 seats on a general ticket | Job Durfee | Adams-Clay; Democratic-Republican | 1820 | Incumbent lost re-election. Anti-Jacksonian hold. | First ballot (August 30, 1825): ▌ ✓ Tristam Burges (Adams-Clay D-R; Anti-Jacksonian) 27.8%; ▌ Dutee J. Pearce (Adams-Clay D-R; Anti-Jacksonian) 24.0%; ▌ Job Durfee (Adams-Clay D-R; Anti-Jacksonian) 23.4%; ▌Samuel Eddy (Adams-Clay D-R; Anti-Jacksonian) 20.1%; ▌William Hunter (Democratic-Republican) 3.5%; Others 1.3%; Second ballot (November 25, 1825): ▌ ✓ Dutee J. Pearce (Adams-Clay D-R; Anti-Jacksonian) 56.9%; ▌Job Durfee (Adams-Clay D-R; Anti-Jacksonian) 43.0%; Scattering 0.1% |

== South Carolina ==
South Carolina elected its members October 11–12, 1824.

District numbers vary between sources.

| District | Incumbent | | | This race | |
| District | Member | Party | First elected | Results | Candidates |
|---|---|---|---|---|---|
| South Carolina 1 | Joel R. Poinsett | Jackson; Democratic-Republican | 1820 | Incumbent re-elected as Jacksonian. | ▌ ✓ Joel R. Poinsett (Jackson D-R; Jacksonian) 58.2%; ▌Samuel Warren (Federalist) 41.8% |
| South Carolina 2 | James Hamilton Jr. | Jackson; Democratic-Republican | 1822 (special) | Incumbent re-elected as Jacksonian. | ▌ ✓ James Hamilton Jr. (Jackson D-R; Jacksonian); Uncontested |
| South Carolina 3 | Robert B. Campbell | Jackson; Democratic-Republican | 1823 | Incumbent retired. Jacksonian hold. | ▌ ✓ Thomas R. Mitchell (Jackson D-R; Jacksonian); Uncontested |
| South Carolina 4 | Andrew R. Govan | Jackson; Democratic-Republican | 1822 (special) | Incumbent re-elected as Jacksonian. | ▌ ✓ Andrew R. Govan (Jackson D-R; Jacksonian) (Note: Source does not give complete data, but partial returns available in source suggest a very large margin.) |
| South Carolina 5 | George McDuffie | Jackson; Democratic-Republican | 1820 | Incumbent re-elected as Jacksonian. | ▌ ✓ George McDuffie (Jackson D-R; Jacksonian); Uncontested |
| South Carolina 6 | John Wilson | Jackson; Democratic-Republican | 1820 | Incumbent re-elected as Jacksonian. | ▌ ✓ John Wilson (Jackson D-R; Jacksonian) 50.8%; ▌Warren R. Davis (Democratic-Republican) 49.2% |
| South Carolina 7 | Joseph Gist | Jackson; Democratic-Republican | 1820 | Incumbent re-elected as Jacksonian. | ▌ ✓ Joseph Gist (Jackson D-R; Jacksonian) 56.9%; ▌James McCreary (Democratic-Republican) 28.8%; ▌Fracis W. Davie (Jacksonian) 14.4% |
| South Carolina 8 | John Carter | Jackson; Democratic-Republican | 1822 (special) | Incumbent re-elected as Jacksonian. | ▌ ✓ John Carter (Jackson D-R; Jacksonian) 46.2%; ▌James G. Spann (Democratic-Republican) 27.9%; ▌Chapman Levy (Independent) 25.9% |
| South Carolina 9 | Starling Tucker | Jackson; Democratic-Republican | 1816 | Incumbent re-elected as Jacksonian. | ▌ ✓ Starling Tucker (Jackson D-R; Jacksonian; Uncontested |

== Tennessee ==
Tennessee elected its members August 4–5, 1825, after the term began but before the new Congress convened.

| District | Incumbent | | | This race | |
| District | Member | Party | First elected | Results | Candidates |
|---|---|---|---|---|---|
| Tennessee 1 | John Blair | Jackson; Democratic-Republican | 1823 | Incumbent re-elected as Jacksonian. | ▌ ✓ John Blair (Jackson D-R; Jacksonian) 51.9%; ▌John Tipton (Unknown) 48.1% |
| Tennessee 2 | John Cocke | Jackson; Democratic-Republican | 1819 | Incumbent re-elected as Jacksonian. | ▌ ✓ John Cocke (Jackson D-R; Jacksonian) 58.8%; ▌Thomas Arnold (Anti-Jacksonian) 41.2% |
| Tennessee 3 | James I. Standifer | Jackson; Democratic-Republican | 1823 | Incumbent lost re-election. Jacksonian hold. | ▌ ✓ James C. Mitchell (Jackson D-R; Jacksonian) 53.3%; ▌James I. Standifer (Jacksonian) 46.7% |
| Tennessee 4 | Jacob C. Isacks | Jackson; Democratic-Republican | 1823 | Incumbent re-elected as Jacksonian. | ▌ ✓ Jacob C. Isacks (Jackson D-R; Jacksonian); Uncontested |
| Tennessee 5 | Robert Allen | Jackson; Democratic-Republican | 1819 | Incumbent re-elected as Jacksonian. | ▌ ✓ Robert Allen (Jackson D-R; Jacksonian); Uncontested |
| Tennessee 6 | James T. Sandford | Jackson; Democratic-Republican | 1823 | Incumbent lost re-election. Jacksonian hold. | ▌ ✓ James K. Polk (Jackson D-R; Jacksonian) 35.3%; ▌Andrew Erwin (Unknown) 26.5%; ▌Lunsford M. Bramlett (Unknown) 22.7%; ▌James T. Sandford (Jacksonian D-R; Jacksonian) 14.6%; ▌Francis Willis (Unknown) 1.0% |
| Tennessee 7 | Sam Houston | Jackson; Democratic-Republican | 1823 | Incumbent re-elected as Jacksonian. | ▌ ✓ Sam Houston (Jackson D-R; Jacksonian) 84.8%; ▌John Bruce (Unknown) 15.1% |
| Tennessee 8 | James B. Reynolds | Jackson; Democratic-Republican | 1815; 1817 (lost); 1823 | Incumbent lost re-election. Jacksonian hold. | ▌ ✓ John H. Marable (Jackson D-R; Jacksonian) 38.7%; ▌James B. Reynolds (Jacksonian D-R; Jacksonian) 34.1%; ▌Willie Blount (Unknown) 27.2% |
| Tennessee 9 | Adam R. Alexander | Jackson; Democratic-Republican | 1823 | Incumbent re-elected as Jacksonian. | ▌ ✓ Adam R. Alexander (Jackson D-R; Jacksonian) 42.0%; ▌David Crockett (Anti-Jacksonian) 38.1%; ▌James Ferrill (Unknown) 13.4%; ▌Thomas H. Pearsons (Unknown) 6.6% |

== Vermont ==
Vermont elected its members September 7, 1824. Congressional districts were re-established in Vermont for the 1824 election. Vermont had used an at-large district 1812-1818 and 1822. A majority was required for election, which was not met in the 1st district, necessitating a second election December 6, 1824.

| District | Incumbent | | | This race | |
| District | Member | Party | First elected | Results | Candidates |
|---|---|---|---|---|---|
| Vermont 1 | William C. Bradley; Redistricted from the at-large district | Adams-Clay; Democratic-Republican | 1812; 1814 (lost); 1822 | Incumbent re-elected as Anti-Jacksonian. | First ballot (September 7, 1824): ▌William C. Bradley (Adams-Clay D-R; Anti-Jacksonian) 49.8%; ▌Phineas White (Federalist) 36.9%; ▌Calvin Sheldon (Democratic-Republican) 10.7%; Write-ins 2.6%; Second ballot (December 6, 1824): ▌ ✓ William C. Bradley (Adams-Clay D-R; Anti-Jacksonian) 59.2%; ▌Phineas White (Federalist) 37.6%; ▌Horace Everett (D-R; Anti-Jacksonian) 3.2% |
| Vermont 2 | Rollin C. Mallary; Redistricted from the at-large district | Adams-Clay; Democratic-Republican | 1818 | Incumbent re-elected as Anti-Jacksonian. | ▌ ✓ Rollin C. Mallary (Adams-Clay D-R; Anti-Jacksonian) 95.6%; ▌Charles K. Williams (Democratic-Republican) 2.2%; ▌Charles Rich (Democratic-Republican) 0.9% |
| Vermont 2 | Charles Rich; Redistricted from the at-large district | Adams-Clay; Democratic-Republican | 1812; 1814 (lost); 1816 | Incumbent lost re-election, then died October 15, 1824, leading to a special election. Democratic-Republican loss. | ▌ ✓ Rollin C. Mallary (Adams-Clay D-R; Anti-Jacksonian) 95.6%; ▌Charles K. Williams (Democratic-Republican) 2.2%; ▌Charles Rich (Democratic-Republican) 0.9% |
| Vermont 3 | None (District created) | | | New seat. Anti-Jacksonian gain. | ▌ ✓ George E. Wales (Adams-Clay D-R; Anti-Jacksonian) 70.0%; ▌Horace Everett (D-R; Anti-Jacksonian) 23.9%; ▌Elias Keyes (Democratic-Republican) 4.8%; Write-ins 1.3% |
| Vermont 4 | Samuel C. Crafts; Redistricted from the at-large district | Adams-Clay; Democratic-Republican | 1816 | Incumbent lost re-election. Jacksonian gain. | ▌ ✓ Ezra Meech (Jackson D-R; Jacksonian) 54.6%; ▌Benjamin Swift (D-R; Anti-Jacksonian) 32.4%; ▌Stephen Royce (Democratic-Republican) 7.2%; ▌Herman Allen (Federalist) 3.6%; ▌Samuel C. Crafts (D-R; Anti-Jacksonian) 0.6%; Write-ins 1.6% |
| Vermont 5 | D. Azro A. Buck; Redistricted from the at-large district | Adams-Clay; Democratic-Republican | 1822 | Incumbent lost re-election. Anti-Jacksonian hold. | ▌ ✓ John Mattocks (Adams-Clay Federalist; Anti-Jacksonian) 50.7%; ▌D. Azro A. Buck (Adams-Clay D-R; Anti-Jacksonian) 47.7%; Write-ins 1.7% |

== Virginia ==
Virginia elected its members in April 1825, after the term began but before the new Congress convened.

| District | Incumbent | | | This race | |
| District | Member | Party | First elected | Results | Candidates |
|---|---|---|---|---|---|
| Virginia 1 | Thomas Newton Jr. | Adams-Clay; Democratic-Republican | 1801 | Incumbent re-elected as Anti-Jacksonian. | ▌ ✓ Thomas Newton Jr. (Adams-Clay D-R; Anti-Jacksonian); Uncontested |
| Virginia 2 | Arthur Smith | Crawford; Democratic-Republican | 1821 | Incumbent retired. Jacksonian gain. | ▌ ✓ James Trezvant (Jackson D-R; Jacksonian) 71.0%; ▌Richard Eppes (Unknown) 29.0% |
| Virginia 3 | William S. Archer | Crawford; Democratic-Republican | 1820 (special) | Incumbent re-elected as Jacksonian. Jacksonian gain. | ▌ ✓ William S. Archer (Crawford D-R; Jacksonian); Uncontested |
| Virginia 4 | Mark Alexander | Crawford; Democratic-Republican | 1819 | Incumbent re-elected as Jacksonian. Jacksonian gain. | ▌ ✓ Mark Alexander (Crawford D-R; Jacksonian); Uncontested |
| Virginia 5 | John Randolph | Crawford; Democratic-Republican | 1799; 1813 (lost); 1815; 1817 (lost); 1819 | Incumbent re-elected as Jacksonian. Jacksonian gain. | ▌ ✓ John Randolph (Crawford D-R; Jacksonian); Uncontested |
| Virginia 6 | George Tucker | Crawford; Democratic-Republican | 1819 | Incumbent retired. Jacksonian gain. | ▌ ✓ Thomas Davenport (Jackson D-R; Jacksonian) 53.9%; ▌James Lanier (Unknown) 22.6%; ▌Barzillai Graves (Unknown) 16.3%; ▌John D. Urquhart (Unknown) 7.2% |
| Virginia 7 | Jabez Leftwich | Crawford; Democratic-Republican | 1821 | Incumbent lost re-election. Jacksonian gain. | ▌ ✓ Nathaniel Claiborne (Jackson D-R; Jacksonian) 51.4%; ▌Jabez Leftwich (Crawford D-R) 48.6% |
| Virginia 8 | Burwell Bassett | Crawford; Democratic-Republican | 1805; 1812 (lost); 1815; 1819 (retired); 1821 | Incumbent re-elected as Jacksonian. Jacksonian gain. | ▌ ✓ Burwell Bassett (Crawford D-R; Jacksonian) 95.5%; ▌Servant Jones (Unknown) 4.5% |
| Virginia 9 | Andrew Stevenson | Crawford; Democratic-Republican | 1821 | Incumbent re-elected as Jacksonian. Jacksonian gain. | ▌ ✓ Andrew Stevenson (Crawford D-R; Jacksonian); Uncontested |
| Virginia 10 | William C. Rives | Crawford; Democratic-Republican | 1823 | Incumbent re-elected as Jacksonian. Jacksonian gain. | ▌ ✓ William C. Rives (Crawford D-R; Jacksonian); Uncontested |
| Virginia 11 | Philip P. Barbour | Crawford; Democratic-Republican | 1814 (special) | Incumbent retired. Anti-Jacksonian gain. | ▌ ✓ Robert Taylor (Adams-Clay D-R; Anti-Jacksonian) 100% |
| Virginia 12 | Robert S. Garnett | Crawford; Democratic-Republican | 1817 | Incumbent re-elected as Jacksonian. Jacksonian gain. | ▌ ✓ Robert S. Garnett (Crawford D-R; Jacksonian) 68.5%; ▌John H. Upshaw (Federalist) 31.5% |
| Virginia 13 | John Taliaferro | Crawford; Democratic-Republican | 1824 (special) | Incumbent re-elected as Anti-Jacksonian. Anti-Jacksonian gain. | ▌ ✓ John Taliaferro (Adams-Clay D-R; Anti-Jacksonian) 63.3%; ▌John Hooe (Federalist) 36.7% |
| Virginia 14 | Charles F. Mercer | Crawford; Democratic-Republican | 1817 | Incumbent re-elected as Anti-Jacksonian. Anti-Jacksonian gain. | ▌ ✓ Charles F. Mercer (Adams-Clay D-R; Anti-Jacksonian); Uncontested |
| Virginia 15 | John S. Barbour | Crawford; Democratic-Republican | 1823 | Incumbent re-elected as Jacksonian. Jacksonian gain. | ▌ ✓ John S. Barbour (Crawford D-R; Jacksonian) 53.7%; ▌Thomas Marshall (Federalist) 46.3% |
| Virginia 16 | James Stephenson | Crawford Federalist | 1821 | Incumbent retired. Anti-Jacksonian gain. | ▌ ✓ William Armstrong (Adams-Clay D-R; Anti-Jacksonian) 57.1%; ▌Edward Colston (Federalist) 42.9% |
| Virginia 17 | Jared Williams | Crawford; Democratic-Republican | 1819 | Incumbent retired. Anti-Jacksonian gain. | ▌ ✓ Alfred H. Powell (Adams-Clay D-R; Anti-Jacksonian) 42.0%; ▌William Steenergen (Unknown) 21.5%; ▌Augustine C. Smith (Unknown) 20.3%; ▌Samuel Kercheval (Jackson D-R; Jacksonian) 13.6%; ▌Robert Allen (Jacksonian) 2.6% |
| Virginia 18 | Joseph Johnson | Jackson; Democratic-Republican | 1823 | Incumbent re-elected as Jacksonian. | ▌ ✓ Joseph Johnson (Jackson D-R; Jacksonian) 62.0%; ▌Phillip Doddridge (Federalist) 38.0% |
| Virginia 19 | William McCoy | Crawford; Democratic-Republican | 1811 | Incumbent re-elected as Jacksonian. Jacksonian gain. | ▌ ✓ William McCoy (Crawford D-R; Jacksonian) 73.7%; ▌Daniel Sheffey (Federalist) 26.3% |
| Virginia 20 | John Floyd | Crawford; Democratic-Republican | 1817 | Incumbent re-elected as Jacksonian. Jacksonian gain. | ▌ ✓ John Floyd (Crawford D-R; Jacksonian) 84.7%; ▌Allen Taylor (Unknown) 15.3% |
| Virginia 21 | William Smith | Crawford; Democratic-Republican | 1821 | Incumbent re-elected as Jacksonian. Jacksonian gain. | ▌ ✓ William Smith (Crawford D-R; Jacksonian) 55.2%; ▌James Lovell (Unknown) 44.8% |
| Virginia 22 | Alexander Smyth | Crawford; Democratic-Republican | 1817 | Incumbent retired. Anti-Jacksonian gain. | ▌ ✓ Benjamin Estil (Adams-Clay D-R; Anti-Jacksonian) 58.9%; ▌Joseph Crockett (Unknown) 32.0%; ▌William Graham (Unknown) 9.1% |

== Non-voting delegates ==
| District | Incumbent | | | This race | |
| District | Delegate | Party | First elected | Results | Candidates |
|---|---|---|---|---|---|
| Arkansas Territory at-large | Henry Conway | Democratic- Republican | 1822 | Incumbent re-elected. | ▌ ✓ Henry Conway (Democratic-Republican) 80.2%; ▌James W. Bates (Unknown) 19.8% |
| Florida Territory at-large | Richard Keith Call | Unknown | 1822 | Incumbent retired. | ▌ ✓ Joseph M. White (Unknown) 47.4%; ▌James Gadsen (Unknown) 29.4%; ▌Joseph Hernandez (Unknown) 23.1% |
| Michigan Territory at-large | Gabriel Richard | Independent | 1823 | Incumbent lost re-election. Anti-Jacksonian gain. | ▌ ✓ Austin Eli Wing (Anti-Jacksonian); ▌Gabriel Richard (Independent); ▌John Biddle (Anti-Jacksonian) |

== See also ==
- 1824 United States elections
  - List of United States House of Representatives elections (1824–1854)
  - 1824 United States presidential election
  - 1824–25 United States Senate elections
- 18th United States Congress
- 19th United States Congress

== Bibliography ==
- "A New Nation Votes: American Election Returns 1787-1825". Tufts Digital Library, Tufts University. Archived from the original on January 29, 2015.
- Dubin, Michael J. (March 1, 1998). United States Congressional Elections, 1788-1997: The Official Results of the Elections of the 1st Through 105th Congresses. McFarland and Company. ISBN 978-0786402830.
- Martis, Kenneth C. (January 1, 1989). The Historical Atlas of Political Parties in the United States Congress, 1789-1989. Macmillan Publishing Company. ISBN 978-0029201701.
- Moore, John L., ed. (1994). Congressional Quarterly's Guide to U.S. Elections (Third ed.). Congressional Quarterly Inc. ISBN 978-0871879967.
- "Party Divisions of the House of Representatives* 1789–Present". Office of the Historian, House of United States House of Representatives.
- Mapping Early American Elections project team (2019). "Mapping Early American Elections". Roy Rosenzweig Center for History and New Media, George Mason University.
