= Senator Sibley =

Senator Sibley may refer to:

- David Sibley (politician) (born 1947), Texas State Senate
- Jonas Sibley (1762–1834), Massachusetts State Senate
- Mark H. Sibley (1796–1852), New York State Senate
