= 1825 South Carolina's 1st congressional district special election =

A special election was held in South Carolina's 1st congressional district on May 17, 1825, to fill a vacancy caused by the resignation of Joel R. Poinsett (J) on March 7, 1825 to become Minister to Mexico.

== Election results ==
Candidate	Party	Votes	Percent
William Drayton	Jacksonian	1,236	74.8%
William Crafts	Federalist	417	25.2%

Drayton took his seat on December 5, 1825

== See also ==
- List of special elections to the United States House of Representatives
- 1824 and 1825 United States House of Representatives elections
