= 1824 Pennsylvania's 8th congressional district special election =

On April 20, 1824, Thomas J. Rogers (DR) of Pennsylvania's 8th district resigned, leaving a vacancy which was filled by a special election on October 12, 1824, the same day as the general election for the 19th Congress.

== Election results ==
Candidate	Party	Votes	Percent
George Wolf	Democratic-Republican	4,765	100%

Wolf ran unopposed. He also won the same seat in the 19th Congress.

== See also ==
- List of special elections to the United States House of Representatives
