= 1824 Pennsylvania's 13th congressional district special election =

In June 1824, John Tod (DR) of Pennsylvania's 13th district resigned. A special election was held to fill the resulting vacancy on October 12, 1824, the same day as the elections to the 19th Congress

== Election results ==
Candidate	Party	Votes	Percent
Alexander Thomson	Democratic-Republican	1,077	100%

Thomson ran unopposed. He also won the same seat in the 19th Congress

== See also ==
- List of special elections to the United States House of Representatives
