= 1825 North Carolina's 2nd congressional district special election =

On March 23, 1824, Hutchins G. Burton (DR), who had represented North Carolina's 2nd district, resigned upon being elected Governor. A special election was held to fill the resulting vacancy on January 6, 1825

== Election results ==
Candidate	Party	Votes	Percent
George Outlaw	Democratic-Republican	1,132	55.7%
Willis Alston	Democratic-Republican	899	44.2%

There were, in addition, 3 scattering votes.

== See also ==
- List of special elections to the United States House of Representatives
- 1824 and 1825 United States House of Representatives elections
