= 1825 Pennsylvania's 16th congressional district special election =

On August 26, 1825, before the first session of the 19th Congress began, James Allison, Jr. (J) of Pennsylvania's 16th district resigned. A special election was held to fill the resulting vacancy.

== Election results ==
Candidate	Party	Votes	Percent
Robert Orr, Jr.	Jacksonian	5,157	56.7%
Abner Lacock	Independent	3,944	43.3%

Orr took his seat on December 5, 1825, at the start of the First Session of the 19th Congress.

== See also ==
- List of special elections to the United States House of Representatives
