= 1825 Kentucky's 3rd congressional district special election =

A special election was held in Kentucky's 3rd congressional district on August 1, 1825, to fill a vacancy caused by the resignation of Henry Clay (A) on March 6, 1825 upon being named Secretary of State by President John Quincy Adams.

== Election results ==
James Clark of the Anti-Jacksonian Party defeated Henry Bowman of the Democratic-Republican Party with 59.4% of the vote. Clark took his seat December 5, 1825

Candidate	Party	Votes	Percent
James Clark	Anti-Jacksonian	2,961	59.4%
Henry Bowman	Democratic-Republican	2,026	40.6%

== See also ==
- List of special elections to the United States House of Representatives
