= Jonas Sibley =

American politician (1762–1834)

Member of the U.S. House of Representatives from Massachusetts's 5th district
- In office March 4, 1823 – March 3, 1825
- Preceded by: Samuel Lathrop
- Succeeded by: John Davis

Personal details
- Born: March 7, 1762 Sutton, Province of Massachusetts Bay, British America
- Died: February 5, 1834 (aged 71) Sutton, Massachusetts, U.S.
- Party: Democratic-Republican

Jonas Sibley (March 7, 1762 – February 5, 1834) was a U.S. representative from Massachusetts.

He was born in Sutton in the Province of Massachusetts Bay, and completed preparatory studies there. He married Lydia Rice of Sutton. He was Selectman, Town moderator, and Town treasurer. He served as member of the Massachusetts House of Representatives, and was a member of the Massachusetts State Senate. He also served as delegate to the Massachusetts Constitutional Convention of 1820–1821.

Sibley was elected as an Adams-Clay Republican to the Eighteenth Congress (March 4, 1823 – March 3, 1825). He was an unsuccessful candidate for reelection, then engaged in agricultural pursuits. He died in Sutton on February 5, 1834, and was interred in Center Cemetery.

U.S. House of Representatives
Preceded by Samuel Lathrop	Member of the U.S. House of Representatives from Massachusetts's 5th congressional district March 4, 1823 – March 3, 1825	Succeeded by John Davis
