= 1824 Indiana's 1st congressional district special election =

A special election was held for the Indiana's 1st district after William Prince (DR-Jackson) died on September 8, 1824.

Consequently, a special election was held to fill the vacancy.

== Election results ==
Candidate	Party	Votes	Percent
Jacob Call	Jacksonian	2,155	50.4%
Thomas H. Blake	Anti-Jacksonian	2,087	48.8%
Ratliff Boon	Jacksonian	36	0.8%

Call took his seat on December 23, 1824, serving until the end of the 18th Congress on March 13, 1825.

== See also ==
- List of special elections to the United States House of Representatives
