= 1820–21 United States House of Representatives elections =

House elections for the 17th U.S. Congress

- July 3, 1820 – August 10, 1821

All 187 (Note: Includes "late" elections held after the March 4 beginning of the term.) seats in the United States House of Representatives 94 seats needed for a majority
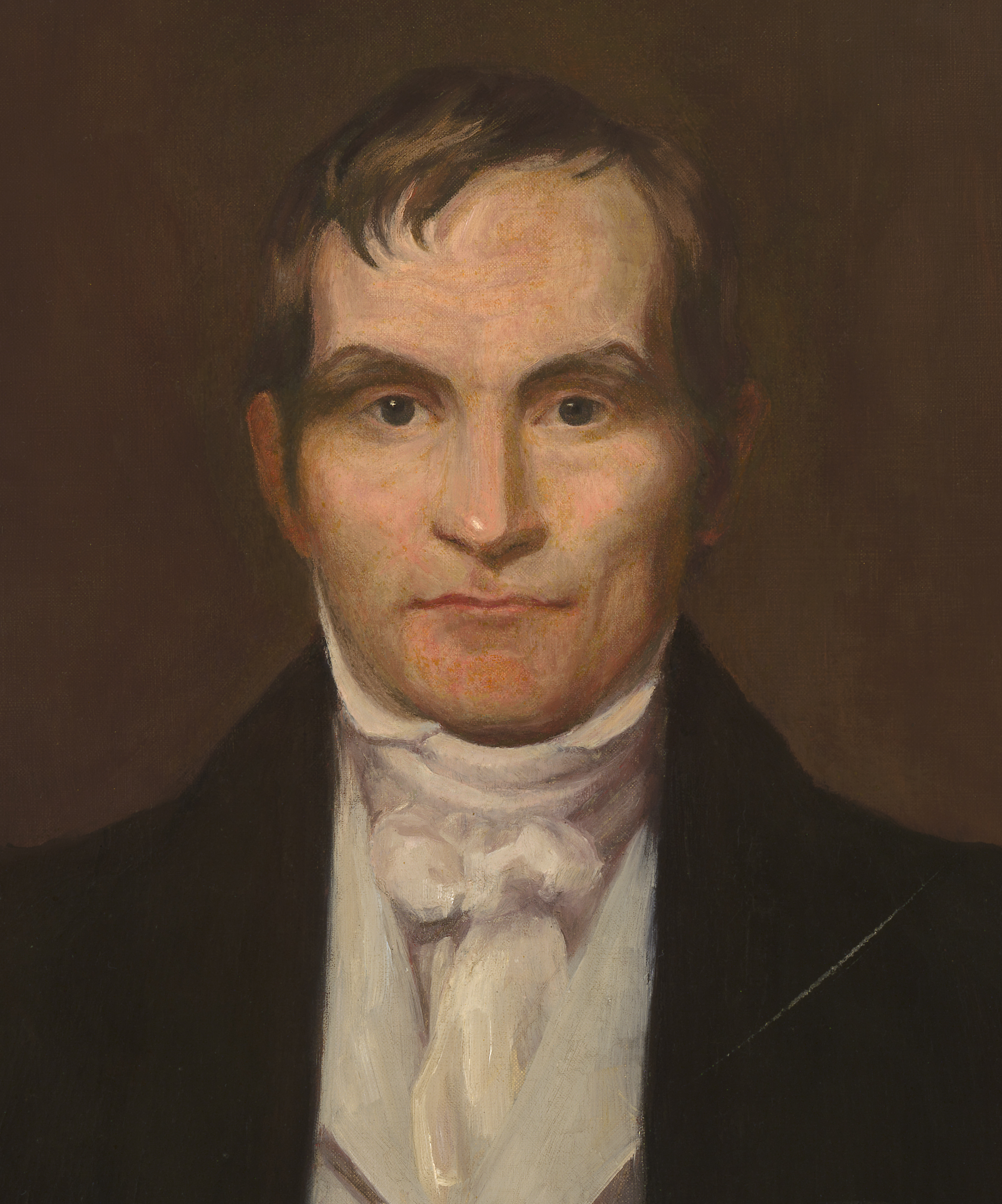

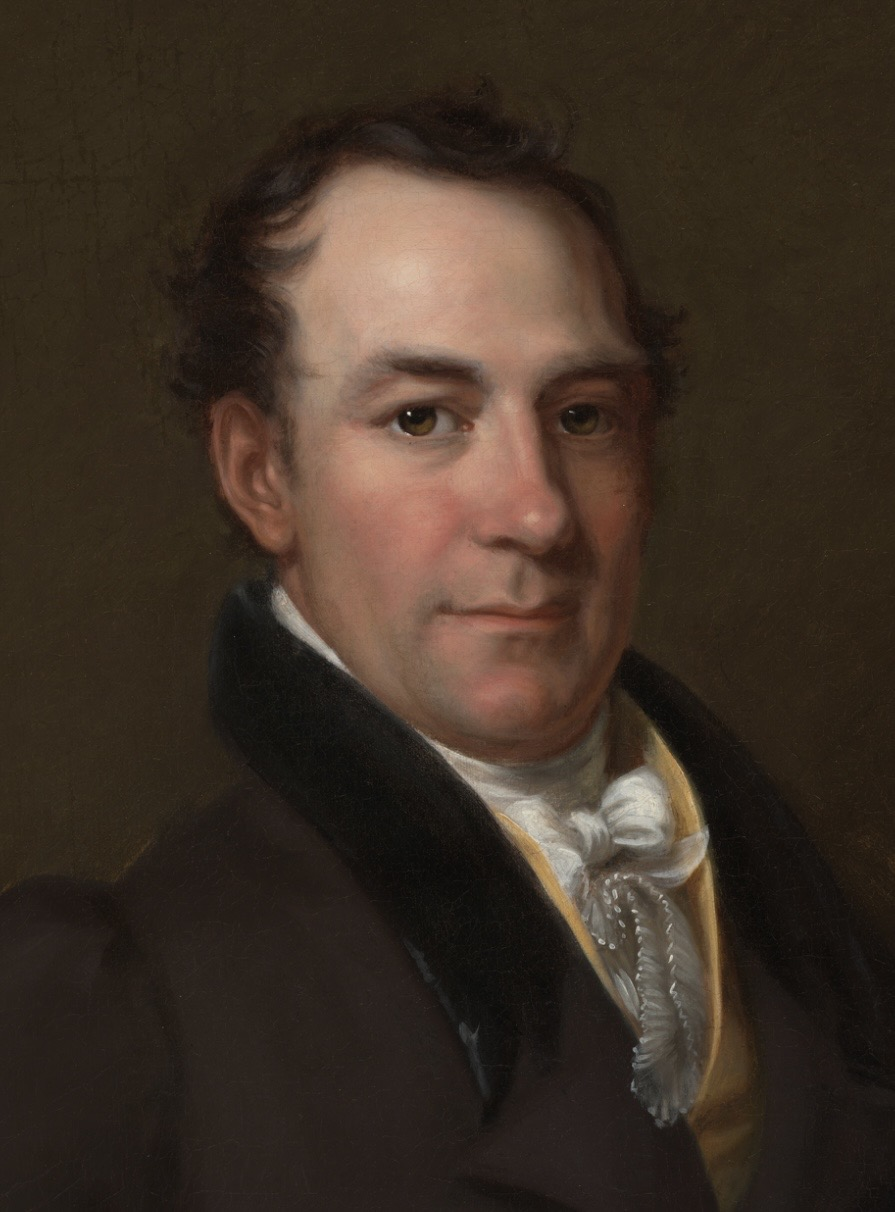
	Majority party	Minority party
Leader	Philip P. Barbour	Louis McLane
Party	Democratic-Republican	Federalist
Leader's seat	Virginia 11th	Delaware at-large
Last election	160 seats	26 seats
Seats won	155	32
Seat change	▼5	▲6
Speaker before election
John W. Taylor
Democratic-Republican
Elected Speaker
Philip P. Barbour
Democratic-Republican

The 1820–21 United States House of Representatives elections were held on various dates in various states between July 3, 1820, and August 10, 1821. Each state set its own date for its elections to the House of Representatives before the first session of the 17th United States Congress convened on December 3, 1821. They coincided with President James Monroe winning reelection unopposed.

In March 1820, seven House seats transferred from Massachusetts to Maine after the latter seceded from the former to become a separate state. The size of the House then increased to 187 seats after Missouri achieved statehood in 1821.

The virtually nonpartisan Era of Good Feelings, a period of national political dominance by the Democratic-Republican Party, continued. Despite small gains, the Federalist Party remained relegated to limited state and local influence.

== Election summaries ==
One seat was added during this Congress for the new State of Missouri

↓
155	32
Democratic-Republican	Federalist

State	Type	↑ Date	Total seats	Democratic-Republican		Federalist	
State	Type	↑ Date	Total seats	Seats	Change	Seats	Change
Louisiana	At-large	July 3–5, 1820	1	1	Steady	0	Steady
Illinois	At-large	August 7, 1820	1	1	Steady	0	Steady
Indiana	At-large	August 7, 1820	1	1	Steady	0	Steady
Kentucky	Districts	August 7, 1820	10	10	Steady	0	Steady
Mississippi	At-large	August 7–8, 1820	1	1	Steady	0	Steady
New Hampshire	At-large	August 18, 1820	6	6	Steady	0	Steady
Missouri	At-large	August 28, 1820	1	1	▲1	0	Steady
Rhode Island	At-large	August 29, 1820	2	2	Steady	0	Steady
Vermont	District	September 5, 1820 (Note: Majority requirement for election which was not met in 2 districts requiring 6 additional elections held on December 11, 1820, February 19, May 1, July 2, September 4, and October 22, 1821.)	6	6	Steady	0	Steady
Georgia	At-large	October 2, 1820	6	6	Steady	0	Steady
Maryland	Districts	October 2, 1820	9	6	Steady	3	Steady
Delaware	At-large	October 3, 1820	2	1	Steady	1	Steady
South Carolina	Districts	October 9–10, 1820	9	9	Steady	0	Steady
Ohio	Districts	October 10, 1820	6	6	▲1	0	▼1
Pennsylvania	Districts	October 10, 1820	23	15	▼4	8	▲4
Massachusetts	Districts	November 6, 1820 (Note: Majority requirement for election which was not met in 1 district requiring additional elections on January 8 and April 16, 1821.)	13 (Note: After seven districts were moved to the new state of Maine.)	6	▼1 (Note: Compared to districts 1-13 in 1818)	7	▲1
Maine (Note: Previously part of Massachusetts.)	Districts	November 7, 1820 (Note: Majority requirement for election, which was not met in 3 districts requiring additional elections on January 22, 1821 and September 10, 1821.)	7	5	▼1 (Note: Compared to the districts comprising the former District of Maine (Former Massachusetts's 14th district through Massachusetts's 20th district)	2	▲1
New Jersey	At-large	November 7, 1820	6	6	Steady	0	Steady
Late elections (after the March 4, 1821, beginning of the term)
Virginia	Districts	April 1821	23	21	▲1	2	▼1
Connecticut	At-large	April 2, 1821	7	7	Steady	0	Steady
New York	Districts	April 24–26, 1821	27	19	▼2	8	▲2
Alabama	At-large	August 5–6, 1821	1	1	Steady	0	Steady
North Carolina	Districts	August 9, 1821	13	12	▲2	1	▼2
Tennessee	Districts	August 9–10, 1821	6	5 (Note: Tennessee's 6th district remained vacant for the entirety of the 17th Congress.)	▼1	0	Steady
Total			187	155 82.9%	▼5	32 17.1%	▲6

House seats
Dem-Republican	82.89%
Federalist	17.11%

== Special elections ==
There were special elections in 1820 and 1821 to the 16th United States Congress and 17th United States Congress.

Special elections are sorted by date then district.

=== 16th Congress ===
District	Incumbent			This race	
District	Member / Delegate	Party	First elected	Results	Candidates
Virginia 17	James Pleasants	Democratic- Republican	1817	Incumbent resigned December 14, 1819, when elected U.S. Senator. New member elected January 3, 1820 and seated January 18, 1820. Democratic-Republican hold. Winner later re-elected to the next term; see below.	▌ ✓ William S. Archer (Democratic-Republican); ▌James Robertson (Unknown)
New Jersey at-large	John Condit	Democratic- Republican	1818	Incumbent resigned November 4, 1819, to become assistant collector of the Port of New York. New member elected February 2, 1820 and seated February 16, 1820. Democratic-Republican hold. Winner was not a candidate for the next term; see below.	▌ ✓ Charles Kinsey (Democratic-Republican) 62.2%; ▌James Parker (Unknown) 10.1%; ▌George Cassedy (Democratic-Republican) 5.1%; ▌Lewis Condict (Democratic-Republican) 3.4%; ▌Ebenezer Elmer (Democratic-Republican) 3.3%; ▌Gerard Rutgers (Unknown) 3.2%; ▌John Rutherford (Unknown) 2.9%; ▌Charles Kinsey (Democratic-Republican) 2.2%; ▌James D. Westcott (Unknown) 1.4%; ▌Thomas T. Kinney (Unknown) 1.1%; Scattering 5.1%
Virginia 10	George F. Strother	Democratic- Republican	1817	Incumbent resigned February 10, 1820, to become as Receiver of Public Monies in St. Louis, Missouri. New member elected in August 1820 and seated November 13, 1820. Democratic-Republican hold. Winner later re-elected to the next term; see below.	▌ ✓ Thomas L. Moore (Democratic-Republican) 41.0%; ▌Zephaniah Turner (Unknown) 27.5%; ▌John Love (Democratic-Republican) 27.0%; ▌Mark A. Chilton (Unknown) 4.5%
Michigan Territory at-large	William Woodbridge	Unknown	1819	Incumbent resigned August 9, 1820, due to family illness. New delegate elected in 1820 and seated November 20, 1820. Winner later re-elected; see below.	▌ ✓ Solomon Sibley (Democratic-Republican) 41.4%; ▌Augustus B. Woodward (Unknown) 40.0%; ▌James MacClosky (Unknown) 17.3%; ▌Jonathan R. Williams (Unknown) 1.4%
Virginia 1	James Pindall	Federalist	1817	Incumbent resigned July 6, 1820. New member elected in 1820 and seated November 13, 1820. Democratic-Republican gain. Winner later re-elected to the next term; see below.	▌ ✓ Edward B. Jackson (Democratic-Republican) 60.6%; ▌Isaac Leffler (Unknown) 35.4%; ▌Thomas P. Moore (Democratic-Republican) 4.0%
Virginia 20	James Johnson	Democratic- Republican	1813	Incumbent resigned when appointed as collector of customs in Norfolk. New member elected in 1820 and seated November 13, 1820. Democratic-Republican hold. Winner later lost re-election to the next term; see below.	▌ ✓ John C. Gray (Democratic-Republican) 52.6%; ▌Arthur Smith (Democratic-Republican) 47.4%
Kentucky 9	Tunstall Quarles	Democratic- Republican	1816	Incumbent resigned June 15, 1820. New member elected August 7, 1820 and seated November 13, 1820. Democratic-Republican hold. Winner was also elected to the next term; see below.	▌ ✓ Thomas Montgomery (Democratic-Republican); [data missing]
Kentucky 6	David Walker	Democratic- Republican	1816	Incumbent died March 1, 1820. New member elected August 7, 1820 and seated November 13, 1820. Democratic-Republican hold. Winner was also elected to the next term; see below.	▌ ✓ Francis Johnson (Democratic-Republican); [data missing]
Massachusetts 13	Edward Dowse	Democratic- Republican	1818	Incumbent resigned. New member elected August 21, 1820 and seated November 13, 1820. Democratic-Republican hold. Winner was later re-elected to the next term; see below.	▌ ✓ William Eustis (Democratic-Republican) 56.2%; ▌James Richardson (Federalist) 38.4%; Scattering 5.4%
Pennsylvania 5	David Fullerton	Democratic- Republican	1818	Incumbent resigned May 15, 1820. New member elected October 10, 1820 and seated November 13, 1820. Federalist gain. Winner was not a candidate for election to the next term; see below.	▌ ✓ Thomas G. McCullough (Federalist) 51.4%; ▌Matthew S. Clarke (Democratic-Republican) 43.3%; ▌Robert K. Lowry (Independent) 5.4%
Massachusetts 1	Jonathan Mason	Federalist	1817 (special)	Incumbent resigned May 15, 1820, to pursue his law practice. New member elected on the second ballot November 6, 1820 and seated November 27, 1820. Democratic-Republican gain. (Note: Some sources cite Benjamin Gorham as a Federalist.); Winner also elected to the next term; see below.	First ballot (October 23, 1820): ▌Benjamin Gorham (Democratic-Republican) 48.3%; ▌Henry Orne (Democratic-Republican) 26.1%; ▌Samuel Wells (Independent) 25.6%; Second ballot (November 6, 1820): ▌ ✓ Benjamin Gorham (Democratic-Republican) 58.0%; ▌Samuel Wells (Independent) 40.1%; ▌Jesse Putnam (Unknown) 1.4%; Scattering 0.5%
Maine at-large	John Holmes	Democratic- Republican	1816	Incumbent's seat moved from Massachusetts's 14th district but incumbent resigned when elected U.S. Senator. New member elected November 7, 1820 and seated December 11, 1820. Federalist gain. Winner was also elected in the 1st district election to the next term; see below.	▌ ✓ Joseph Dane (Federalist) 53.6%; ▌Alexander Rice (Democratic-Republican) 38.2%; ▌Isaac Lyman (Unknown) 4.5%; ▌William Moody (Unknown) 2.3%; Others 1.0%
Massachusetts 8	Zabdiel Sampson	Democratic- Republican	1817	Incumbent resigned July 26, 1820. New member elected November 24, 1820 and seated December 18, 1820. Winner had already been elected to the next term; see below.	First ballot (October 16, 1820): ▌Aaron Hobart (Democratic-Republican) 52.1%; ▌William Baylies (Federalist) 47.9%; Second ballot (November 24, 1820): ▌ ✓ Aaron Hobart (Democratic-Republican) 68.7%; Scattering 31.3%
Pennsylvania 7	Joseph Hiester	Democratic- Republican	1798; 1804 (retired); 1814	Incumbent resigned in December 1820 when elected Governor of Pennsylvania. New member elected December 10, 1820 and seated January 8, 1821. Democratic-Republican hold. Winner was not a candidate for election to the next term; see below.	▌ ✓ Daniel Udree (Democratic-Republican); ▌Ludwig Worman (Federalist)
North Carolina 4	Jesse Slocumb	Democratic- Republican	1817	Incumbent died December 20, 1820. New member elected February 7, 1821 and seated February 7, 1821. Democratic-Republican hold. Winner later re-elected to the next term; see below.	▌ ✓ William S. Blackledge (Democratic-Republican) 57.7%; ▌Barnabus MacKinnie (Unknown) 42.3%

=== 17th Congress ===
District	Incumbent			This race	
District	Member	Party	First elected	Results	Candidates
Kentucky 7	George Robertson	Democratic- Republican	1816	Incumbent resigned sometime before the start of the new Congress. New member elected August 6, 1821 and seated December 3, 1821. Democratic-Republican hold.	▌ ✓ John S. Smith (Democratic-Republican); ▌Stephen Richardson (Unknown)
New Jersey at-large	John Linn	Democratic- Republican	1816	Incumbent died January 5, 1821. New member elected October 8, 1821 and seated December 3, 1821. Democratic-Republican hold.	▌ ✓ Lewis Condict (Democratic-Republican) 46.5%; ▌Robert W. Rutherford (Democratic-Republican) 31.3%; ▌James Parker (Federalist) 22.2%
Ohio 4	John C. Wright	Democratic- Republican	1818	Incumbent member-elect declined to serve in the next term and resigned March 3, 1821. New member elected October 9, 1821 and seated December 3, 1821. Democratic-Republican hold.	▌ ✓ David Chambers (Democratic-Republican); ▌John Patterson (Democratic-Republican) (Note: Source does not give numbers of votes or has incomplete data.)
Pennsylvania 5	James Duncan	Democratic- Republican	1820	Incumbent resigned in April 1821. New member elected October 9, 1821 and seated December 12, 1821. Democratic-Republican hold.	▌ ✓ John Findlay (Democratic-Republican) 53.6%; ▌Thomas G. McCullough (Federalist) 46.4%
Pennsylvania 10	William Cox Ellis	Federalist	1820	Incumbent resigned July 20, 1821. New member elected October 9, 1821 and seated December 12, 1821. Democratic-Republican hold.	▌ ✓ Thomas Murray Jr. (Democratic-Republican) 50.3%; ▌William Cox Ellis (Federalist) 49.7%
New York 6	Selah Tuthill	Democratic- Republican	1821	Incumbent died September 7, 1821. New member elected November 6–8, 1821 and seated December 3, 1821. Democratic-Republican hold.	▌ ✓ Charles Borland Jr. (Democratic-Republican) 53.7%; ▌John Duer (Democratic-Republican) 46.1%
South Carolina 9	John S. Richards	Democratic- Republican	1820	Member-elect declined to serve. New member elected in 1821 and seated December 3, 1821. Democratic-Republican hold.	▌ ✓ James Blair (Democratic-Republican) 49.1%; ▌Joseph Brevard (Democratic-Republican) 43.6%; ▌James C. Postell (Unknown) 7.3%
Kentucky 8	Wingfield Bullock	Democratic- Republican	1820	Incumbent died October 13, 1821. New member elected November 22, 1821 and seated January 2, 1822. Democratic-Republican hold.	▌ ✓ James D. Breckinridge (Democratic-Republican) 56.3%; ▌George B. Knight (Unknown) 39.2%; ▌Norborne B. Beall (Unknown) 4.4%

== Alabama ==
Alabama elected its member August 5–6, 1821, after the term began but before the new Congress convened.

District	Incumbent			This race	
District	Member	Party	First elected	Results	Candidates
Alabama at-large	John Crowell	Democratic- Republican	1819	Incumbent retired. Democratic-Republican hold.	▌ ✓ Gabriel Moore (Democratic-Republican) 64.6%; ▌George W. Owen (Democratic-Republican) 32.6%; ▌Silas Dinsmoor (Unknown) 2.8%

== Arkansas Territory ==
See Non-voting delegates, below.

== Connecticut ==
Connecticut elected its members April 2, 1821, after the term began but before the new Congress convened.

District	Incumbent			This race	
District	Member	Party	First elected	Results	Candidates
Connecticut at-large 7 seats on a general ticket	James Stevens	Democratic-Republican	1818	Incumbent retired. Democratic-Republican hold.	▌ ✓ Gideon Tomlinson (Democratic-Republican) 14.3%; ▌ ✓ Noyes Barber (Democratic-Republican) 13.8%; ▌ ✓ Henry W. Edwards (Democratic-Republican) 13.7%; ▌ ✓ John Russ (Democratic-Republican) 13.5%; ▌ ✓ Ebenezer Stoddard (Democratic-Republican) 13.4%; ▌ ✓ Ansel Sterling (Democratic-Republican) 13.1%; ▌ ✓ Daniel Burrows (Democratic-Republican) 9.6%; ▌Calvin Willey (Democratic-Republican) 4.1%; ▌Timothy Pitkin (Federalist) 1.0%; Others 3.5%
Connecticut at-large 7 seats on a general ticket	Jonathan O. Moseley	Democratic-Republican	1804	Incumbent retired. Democratic-Republican hold.	▌ ✓ Gideon Tomlinson (Democratic-Republican) 14.3%; ▌ ✓ Noyes Barber (Democratic-Republican) 13.8%; ▌ ✓ Henry W. Edwards (Democratic-Republican) 13.7%; ▌ ✓ John Russ (Democratic-Republican) 13.5%; ▌ ✓ Ebenezer Stoddard (Democratic-Republican) 13.4%; ▌ ✓ Ansel Sterling (Democratic-Republican) 13.1%; ▌ ✓ Daniel Burrows (Democratic-Republican) 9.6%; ▌Calvin Willey (Democratic-Republican) 4.1%; ▌Timothy Pitkin (Federalist) 1.0%; Others 3.5%
Connecticut at-large 7 seats on a general ticket	Gideon Tomlinson	Democratic-Republican	1818	Incumbent re-elected.	▌ ✓ Gideon Tomlinson (Democratic-Republican) 14.3%; ▌ ✓ Noyes Barber (Democratic-Republican) 13.8%; ▌ ✓ Henry W. Edwards (Democratic-Republican) 13.7%; ▌ ✓ John Russ (Democratic-Republican) 13.5%; ▌ ✓ Ebenezer Stoddard (Democratic-Republican) 13.4%; ▌ ✓ Ansel Sterling (Democratic-Republican) 13.1%; ▌ ✓ Daniel Burrows (Democratic-Republican) 9.6%; ▌Calvin Willey (Democratic-Republican) 4.1%; ▌Timothy Pitkin (Federalist) 1.0%; Others 3.5%
Connecticut at-large 7 seats on a general ticket	Elisha Phelps	Democratic-Republican	1818	Incumbent lost re-election. Democratic-Republican hold.	▌ ✓ Gideon Tomlinson (Democratic-Republican) 14.3%; ▌ ✓ Noyes Barber (Democratic-Republican) 13.8%; ▌ ✓ Henry W. Edwards (Democratic-Republican) 13.7%; ▌ ✓ John Russ (Democratic-Republican) 13.5%; ▌ ✓ Ebenezer Stoddard (Democratic-Republican) 13.4%; ▌ ✓ Ansel Sterling (Democratic-Republican) 13.1%; ▌ ✓ Daniel Burrows (Democratic-Republican) 9.6%; ▌Calvin Willey (Democratic-Republican) 4.1%; ▌Timothy Pitkin (Federalist) 1.0%; Others 3.5%
Connecticut at-large 7 seats on a general ticket	John Russ	Democratic-Republican	1818	Incumbent re-elected.	▌ ✓ Gideon Tomlinson (Democratic-Republican) 14.3%; ▌ ✓ Noyes Barber (Democratic-Republican) 13.8%; ▌ ✓ Henry W. Edwards (Democratic-Republican) 13.7%; ▌ ✓ John Russ (Democratic-Republican) 13.5%; ▌ ✓ Ebenezer Stoddard (Democratic-Republican) 13.4%; ▌ ✓ Ansel Sterling (Democratic-Republican) 13.1%; ▌ ✓ Daniel Burrows (Democratic-Republican) 9.6%; ▌Calvin Willey (Democratic-Republican) 4.1%; ▌Timothy Pitkin (Federalist) 1.0%; Others 3.5%
Connecticut at-large 7 seats on a general ticket	Henry W. Edwards	Democratic-Republican	1818	Incumbent re-elected.	▌ ✓ Gideon Tomlinson (Democratic-Republican) 14.3%; ▌ ✓ Noyes Barber (Democratic-Republican) 13.8%; ▌ ✓ Henry W. Edwards (Democratic-Republican) 13.7%; ▌ ✓ John Russ (Democratic-Republican) 13.5%; ▌ ✓ Ebenezer Stoddard (Democratic-Republican) 13.4%; ▌ ✓ Ansel Sterling (Democratic-Republican) 13.1%; ▌ ✓ Daniel Burrows (Democratic-Republican) 9.6%; ▌Calvin Willey (Democratic-Republican) 4.1%; ▌Timothy Pitkin (Federalist) 1.0%; Others 3.5%
Connecticut at-large 7 seats on a general ticket	Samuel A. Foot	Democratic-Republican	1818	Incumbent lost re-election. Democratic-Republican hold.	▌ ✓ Gideon Tomlinson (Democratic-Republican) 14.3%; ▌ ✓ Noyes Barber (Democratic-Republican) 13.8%; ▌ ✓ Henry W. Edwards (Democratic-Republican) 13.7%; ▌ ✓ John Russ (Democratic-Republican) 13.5%; ▌ ✓ Ebenezer Stoddard (Democratic-Republican) 13.4%; ▌ ✓ Ansel Sterling (Democratic-Republican) 13.1%; ▌ ✓ Daniel Burrows (Democratic-Republican) 9.6%; ▌Calvin Willey (Democratic-Republican) 4.1%; ▌Timothy Pitkin (Federalist) 1.0%; Others 3.5%

== Delaware ==
Delaware elected its members October 3, 1820.

District	Incumbent			This race	
District	Member	Party	First elected	Results	Candidates
Delaware at-large 2 seats on a general ticket	Louis McLane	Federalist	1816	Incumbent re-elected.	▌ ✓ Caesar A. Rodney (Democratic-Republican) 26.9%; ▌ ✓ Louis McLane (Federalist) 26.1%; ▌Willard Hall (Democratic-Republican) 23.5%; ▌John Mitchell (Federalist) 23.3%; Others 0.2%
Delaware at-large 2 seats on a general ticket	Willard Hall	Democratic- Republican	1816	Incumbent lost re-election. Democratic-Republican hold.	▌ ✓ Caesar A. Rodney (Democratic-Republican) 26.9%; ▌ ✓ Louis McLane (Federalist) 26.1%; ▌Willard Hall (Democratic-Republican) 23.5%; ▌John Mitchell (Federalist) 23.3%; Others 0.2%

== Georgia ==
Georgia elected its members October 2, 1820.

District	Incumbent			This race	
District	Member	Party	First elected	Results	Candidates
Georgia at-large 6 seats on a general ticket	Robert R. Reid	Democratic-Republican	1819 (special)	Incumbent re-elected.	▌ ✓ Robert R. Reid (Democratic-Republican) 14.8%%; ▌ ✓ Alfred Cuthbert (Democratic-Republican) 12.5%; ▌ ✓ Joel Abbot (Democratic-Republican) 12.3%; ▌ ✓ George R. Gilmer (Democratic-Republican) 11.1%; ▌ ✓ Edward F. Tattnall (Democratic-Republican) 11.1%; ▌ ✓ Wiley Thompson (Democratic-Republican) 10.7%; ▌Thomas W. Cobb (Democratic-Republican) 10.6%; ▌George Walton (Unknown) 7.2%; ▌Zadock Cook (Democratic-Republican) 4.2%; ▌Gibson Clark (Unknown) 2.9%; ▌James Blair (Unknown) 2.7%
Georgia at-large 6 seats on a general ticket	Joel Crawford	Democratic-Republican	1816	Incumbent retired. Democratic-Republican hold.	▌ ✓ Robert R. Reid (Democratic-Republican) 14.8%%; ▌ ✓ Alfred Cuthbert (Democratic-Republican) 12.5%; ▌ ✓ Joel Abbot (Democratic-Republican) 12.3%; ▌ ✓ George R. Gilmer (Democratic-Republican) 11.1%; ▌ ✓ Edward F. Tattnall (Democratic-Republican) 11.1%; ▌ ✓ Wiley Thompson (Democratic-Republican) 10.7%; ▌Thomas W. Cobb (Democratic-Republican) 10.6%; ▌George Walton (Unknown) 7.2%; ▌Zadock Cook (Democratic-Republican) 4.2%; ▌Gibson Clark (Unknown) 2.9%; ▌James Blair (Unknown) 2.7%
Georgia at-large 6 seats on a general ticket	Joel Abbot	Democratic-Republican	1816	Incumbent re-elected.	▌ ✓ Robert R. Reid (Democratic-Republican) 14.8%%; ▌ ✓ Alfred Cuthbert (Democratic-Republican) 12.5%; ▌ ✓ Joel Abbot (Democratic-Republican) 12.3%; ▌ ✓ George R. Gilmer (Democratic-Republican) 11.1%; ▌ ✓ Edward F. Tattnall (Democratic-Republican) 11.1%; ▌ ✓ Wiley Thompson (Democratic-Republican) 10.7%; ▌Thomas W. Cobb (Democratic-Republican) 10.6%; ▌George Walton (Unknown) 7.2%; ▌Zadock Cook (Democratic-Republican) 4.2%; ▌Gibson Clark (Unknown) 2.9%; ▌James Blair (Unknown) 2.7%
Georgia at-large 6 seats on a general ticket	John A. Cuthbert	Democratic-Republican	1818	Incumbent retired. Democratic-Republican hold.	▌ ✓ Robert R. Reid (Democratic-Republican) 14.8%%; ▌ ✓ Alfred Cuthbert (Democratic-Republican) 12.5%; ▌ ✓ Joel Abbot (Democratic-Republican) 12.3%; ▌ ✓ George R. Gilmer (Democratic-Republican) 11.1%; ▌ ✓ Edward F. Tattnall (Democratic-Republican) 11.1%; ▌ ✓ Wiley Thompson (Democratic-Republican) 10.7%; ▌Thomas W. Cobb (Democratic-Republican) 10.6%; ▌George Walton (Unknown) 7.2%; ▌Zadock Cook (Democratic-Republican) 4.2%; ▌Gibson Clark (Unknown) 2.9%; ▌James Blair (Unknown) 2.7%
Georgia at-large 6 seats on a general ticket	William Terrell	Democratic-Republican	1816	Incumbent retired. Democratic-Republican hold.	▌ ✓ Robert R. Reid (Democratic-Republican) 14.8%%; ▌ ✓ Alfred Cuthbert (Democratic-Republican) 12.5%; ▌ ✓ Joel Abbot (Democratic-Republican) 12.3%; ▌ ✓ George R. Gilmer (Democratic-Republican) 11.1%; ▌ ✓ Edward F. Tattnall (Democratic-Republican) 11.1%; ▌ ✓ Wiley Thompson (Democratic-Republican) 10.7%; ▌Thomas W. Cobb (Democratic-Republican) 10.6%; ▌George Walton (Unknown) 7.2%; ▌Zadock Cook (Democratic-Republican) 4.2%; ▌Gibson Clark (Unknown) 2.9%; ▌James Blair (Unknown) 2.7%
Georgia at-large 6 seats on a general ticket	Thomas W. Cobb	Democratic-Republican	1818	Incumbent lost re-election. Democratic-Republican hold.	▌ ✓ Robert R. Reid (Democratic-Republican) 14.8%%; ▌ ✓ Alfred Cuthbert (Democratic-Republican) 12.5%; ▌ ✓ Joel Abbot (Democratic-Republican) 12.3%; ▌ ✓ George R. Gilmer (Democratic-Republican) 11.1%; ▌ ✓ Edward F. Tattnall (Democratic-Republican) 11.1%; ▌ ✓ Wiley Thompson (Democratic-Republican) 10.7%; ▌Thomas W. Cobb (Democratic-Republican) 10.6%; ▌George Walton (Unknown) 7.2%; ▌Zadock Cook (Democratic-Republican) 4.2%; ▌Gibson Clark (Unknown) 2.9%; ▌James Blair (Unknown) 2.7%

== Illinois ==
Illinois elected its member August 7, 1820.

District	Incumbent			This race	
District	Member	Party	First elected	Results	Candidates
Illinois at-large	Daniel P. Cook	Democratic- Republican	1819	Incumbent re-elected.	▌ ✓ Daniel P. Cook (Democratic-Republican) 64.7%; ▌Elias Kane (Unknown) 35.2%; ▌John McLean (Democratic-Republican) 0.1%

== Indiana ==
Indiana elected its member August 7, 1820.

District	Incumbent			This race	
District	Member	Party	First elected	Results	Candidates
Indiana at-large	William Hendricks	Democratic- Republican	1817	Incumbent re-elected.	▌ ✓ William Hendricks (Democratic-Republican) 91.0%; ▌Reuben W. Nelson (Unknown) 9.0%

== Kentucky ==
Kentucky elected its members August 7, 1820.

District	Incumbent			This race	
District	Member	Party	First elected	Results	Candidates
Kentucky 1	David Trimble	Democratic-Republican	1816	Incumbent re-elected.	▌ ✓ David Trimble (Democratic-Republican) 68.5%; ▌William P. Fleming (Unknown) 31.5%
Kentucky 2	Henry Clay	Democratic-Republican	1810; 1814 (resigned); 1814; 1815 (seat declared vacant); 1815 (special)	Incumbent retired. Democratic-Republican hold.	▌ ✓ Samuel H. Woodson (Democratic-Republican) 59.4%; ▌John Pope (Democratic-Republican) 37.8%; ▌Thomas T. Barr (Unknown) 2.8%
Kentucky 3	William Brown	Democratic-Republican	1818	Incumbent retired. Democratic-Republican hold.	▌ ✓ John T. Johnson (Democratic-Republican) 98.6%; ▌Thomas A. Grimes (Unknown) 1.4%
Kentucky 4	Thomas Metcalfe	Democratic-Republican	1818	Incumbent re-elected.	▌ ✓ Thomas Metcalfe (Democratic-Republican)
Kentucky 5	Alney McLean	Democratic-Republican	1814; 1816 (retired); 1818	Incumbent retired. Democratic-Republican hold.	▌ ✓ Anthony New (Democratic-Republican); ▌John Daviess (Unknown); ▌Dickson Gwen (Unknown)
Kentucky 6	David Walker	Democratic-Republican	1816	Incumbent died March 1, 1820. Democratic-Republican hold. Successor also elected to finish the term.	▌ ✓ Francis Johnson (Democratic-Republican) 57.2%; ▌John Breathitt (Unknown) 41.8%; ▌Willis Wills (Unknown) 1.0%
Kentucky 7	George Robertson	Democratic-Republican	1816	Incumbent re-elected. Incumbent resigned sometime before the start of the new Congress, leading to an August 6, 1821 special election.	▌ ✓ George Robertson (Democratic-Republican)
Kentucky 8	Richard C. Anderson Jr.	Democratic-Republican	1816	Incumbent retired. Democratic-Republican hold. Successor died October 13, 1821, leading to a November 22, 1821 special election.	▌ ✓ Wingfield Bullock (Democratic-Republican); ▌Norborne B. Beall (Unknown); ▌Samuel Churchill (Unknown); ▌John Logan (Unknown)
Kentucky 9	Tunstall Quarles	Democratic-Republican	1816	Incumbent resigned June 15, 1820. Democratic-Republican hold. Successor also elected to finish the term.	▌ ✓ Thomas Montgomery (Democratic-Republican)
Kentucky 10	Benjamin Hardin	Democratic-Republican	1814; 1816 (retired); 1818	Incumbent re-elected.	▌ ✓ Benjamin Hardin (Democratic-Republican); ▌Richard Rudd (Unknown); ▌John Hays (Unknown)

== Louisiana ==
Louisiana elected its member July 3–5, 1820.

District	Incumbent			This race	
District	Member	Party	First elected	Results	Candidates
Louisiana at-large	Thomas Butler	Democratic-Republican	1818	Incumbent lost renomination. Democratic-Republican hold.	▌ ✓ Josiah S. Johnston (Democratic-Republican) 50.9%; ▌Edward Livingston (Democratic-Republican) 49.1%

== Maine ==
This was the first election in Maine since its separation from Massachusetts. In the previous election, Massachusetts had had 20 representatives. Seven seats (representing the 14th-20th districts) were reassigned from Massachusetts to Maine. In addition, under the terms of the law which admitted Maine to the union, any vacancies in the 16th Congress by Representatives elected to represent Massachusetts but residing in the new states of Maine would be filled by a resident of Maine. John Holmes, who had been elected to the House for the former 14th district of Massachusetts was elected as one of the first two senators for Maine. The vacancy was filled in a special election by Joseph Dane (Federalist). Dane was the only Representative officially considered as representing Maine in the 16th Congress. The Representatives from the 15th-20th districts were still classified as being from Massachusetts for the remainder of the 16th Congress.

Maine elected its members on November 7, 1820. State law required a majority to win an election, necessitating additional ballots if a majority was not received. And, in fact, additional ballots were held on January 22, 1821, and September 10, 1821, after the term began but before the new Congress convened.

District	Incumbent			This race	
District	Member	Party	First elected	Results	Candidates
Maine 1	Joseph Dane	Federalist	1820 (special)	Incumbent re-elected.	▌ ✓ Joseph Dane (Federalist) 52.8%; ▌Alexander Rice (Democratic-Republican) 38.7%; ▌Isaac Lyman (Unknown) 6.0%; ▌William Moody (Unknown) 2.4%
Maine 2	Ezekiel Whitman; Redistricted from MA-15	Federalist	1808; 1810 (lost); 1816	Incumbent re-elected.	▌ ✓ Ezekiel Whitman (Federalist) 74.1%; ▌James Irish (Unknown) 24.6%; ▌Mark Harris (Democratic-Republican) 1.3%
Maine 3	Mark Langdon Hill; Redistricted from MA-16	Democratic- Republican	1819	Incumbent re-elected on the second ballot.	First ballot (November 7, 1820): ▌Mark Langdon Hill (Democratic-Republican) 49.9%; ▌Joseph F. Wingate (Democratic-Republican) 39.8%; ▌Joshua Head (Unknown) 4.4%; ▌Daniel Rose (Democratic-Republican) 3.5%; ▌Pearl Stafford (Unknown) 2.4%; Second ballot (January 22, 1821): ▌ ✓ Mark Langdon Hill (Democratic-Republican) 54.2%; ▌Joseph F. Wingate (Democratic-Republican) 44.7%; Others 1.1%
Maine 4	Martin Kinsley; Redistricted from MA-17	Democratic- Republican	1819	Incumbent lost re-election. New member elected on the third ballot after the beginning of the term but before Congress convened. Democratic-Republican hold.	First ballot (November 7, 1820): ▌William D. Williamson (Democratic-Republican) 44.7%; ▌Jacob MacGaw (Federalist) 21.2%; ▌John Cooper (Unknown) 11.8%; ▌Martin Kinsley (Democratic-Republican) 11.2%; ▌John Wilkins (Democratic-Republican) 9.3%; ▌Josiah Kedder (Unknown) 1.3%; Second ballot (January 22, 1821): ▌William D. Williamson (Democratic-Republican) 45.8%; ▌Jacob MacGaw (Federalist) 22.8%; ▌John Wilkins (Democratic-Republican) 13.1%; ▌Martin Kinsley (Democratic-Republican) 9.6%; ▌John Cooper (Unknown) 7.1%; Third ballot (September 10, 1821): ▌ ✓ William D. Williamson (Democratic-Republican) 50.2%; ▌Thomas Cobb (Unknown) 17.8%; ▌Jabez Mowry (Unknown) 17.4%; ▌Martin Kinsley (Democratic-Republican) 8.1%
Maine 5	James Parker; Redistricted from MA-18	Democratic- Republican	1813; 1814 (lost); 1819	Incumbent lost re-election. New member elected on the third ballot after the beginning of the term but before Congress convened. Democratic-Republican hold.	First ballot (November 7, 1820): ▌Ebenezer Herrick (Democratic-Republican) 38.2%; ▌Ebenezer T. Warren (Democratic-Republican) 31.3%; ▌James Parker (Democratic-Republican) 21.6%; ▌Joshua Gage (Democratic-Republican) 4.7%; ▌Peter Grant (Federalist) 1.5%; Others 2.8%; Second ballot (January 22, 1821): ▌Ebenezer Herrick (Democratic-Republican) 38.1%; ▌Joshua Gage (Democratic-Republican) 27.6%; ▌Ebenezer T. Warren (Democratic-Republican) 24.7%; ▌Peter Grant (Federalist) 8.6%; ▌James Parker (Democratic-Republican) 1.0%; Third ballot (September 10, 1821): ▌ ✓ Ebenezer Herrick (Democratic-Republican) 52.7%; ▌Ebenezer T. Warren (Democratic-Republican) 24.6%; ▌Peter Grant (Federalist) 10.5%; ▌Joshua Gage (Democratic-Republican) 7.1%; ▌James Parker (Democratic-Republican) 5.2%
Maine 6	Joshua Cushman; Redistricted from MA-19	Democratic- Republican	1818	Incumbent re-elected.	▌ ✓ Joshua Cushman (Democratic-Republican) 100%
Maine 7	Enoch Lincoln; Redistricted from MA-20	Democratic- Republican	1818 (special)	Incumbent re-elected.	▌ ✓ Enoch Lincoln (Democratic-Republican) 95.9%; ▌Samuel A. Bradley (Unknown) 1.5%; Others 2.6%

== Maryland ==
Maryland elected its members October 2, 1820.

District	Incumbent			This race	
District	Member	Party	First elected	Results	Candidates
Maryland 1	Raphael Neale	Federalist	1818	Incumbent re-elected.	▌ ✓ Raphael Neale (Federalist) 54.0%; ▌Nicholas Stonestreet (Federalist) 46.0%
Maryland 2	Joseph Kent	Democratic- Republican	1818	Incumbent re-elected.	▌ ✓ Joseph Kent (Democratic-Republican) 96.9%; ▌John C. Herbert (Federalist) 2.2%
Maryland 3	Henry R. Warfield	Federalist	1818	Incumbent re-elected.	▌ ✓ Henry R. Warfield (Federalist) 99.3%
Maryland 4	Samuel Ringgold	Democratic- Republican	1810; 1814 (lost); 1816	Incumbent retired. Democratic-Republican hold.	▌ ✓ John Nelson (Democratic-Republican) 57.9%; ▌Thomas C. Worthington (Federalist) 41.9%
Maryland 5 Plural district with 2 seats	Samuel Smith	Democratic- Republican	1792; 1803 (retired); 1816	Incumbent re-elected.	▌ ✓ Peter Little (Democratic-Republican) 50.0%; ▌ ✓ Samuel Smith (Democratic-Republican) 50.0%
Maryland 5 Plural district with 2 seats	Peter Little	Democratic- Republican	1810; 1812 (lost); 1816	Incumbent re-elected.	▌ ✓ Peter Little (Democratic-Republican) 50.0%; ▌ ✓ Samuel Smith (Democratic-Republican) 50.0%
Maryland 6	Stevenson Archer	Democratic- Republican	1811 (special); 1816 (lost); 1818	Incumbent retired. New member elected by lot after tied vote. Democratic-Republican hold. (Note: In Maryland's 6th district, Philip Reed later successfully contested the tie, claiming 7 votes for him that had not been counted, and was seated March 22, 1822.)	▌ ✓ Jeremiah Cosden (Democratic-Republican) 49.9%; ▌Philip Reed (Democratic-Republican) 49.9%
Maryland 7	Thomas Culbreth	Democratic- Republican	1816	Incumbent lost re-election. Democratic-Republican hold.	▌ ✓ Robert Wright (Democratic-Republican) 50.5%; ▌Thomas Culbreth (Democratic-Republican) 49.5%
Maryland 8	Thomas Bayly	Federalist	1816	Incumbent re-elected.	▌ ✓ Thomas Bayly (Federalist) 99.5%

== Massachusetts ==
This was the first election in Massachusetts after the separation of the former District of Maine as the new State of Maine, taking the old 14th – 20th districts with it.

Massachusetts elected its members November 6, 1820. Massachusetts had a majority requirement for election, which was not met in the 2nd district necessitating two additional elections on January 8, 1821, and April 16, 1821, after the term began but before the new Congress convened.

District numbers differed between source used and elsewhere on Wikipedia; district numbers used elsewhere on Wikipedia used here.

District	Incumbent			This race	
District	Member	Party	First elected	Results	Candidates
Massachusetts 1	Jonathan Mason	Federalist	1817 (special)	Incumbent resigned May 15, 1820, to pursue his law practice. Democratic-Republican gain. Successor also elected the same day to finish the term.	▌ ✓ Benjamin Gorham (Democratic-Republican) 57.9%; ▌Samuel Wells (Unknown) 40.2%; ▌Jesse Putname (Unknown) 1.4%; Others 0.5%
Massachusetts 2	Nathaniel Silsbee	Democratic- Republican	1816	Incumbent retired. New member elected late after the term began but before the Congress convened. Democratic-Republican hold.	First ballot (November 6, 1820): ▌Willard Peele (Independent) 38.5%; ▌Gideon Barstow (Democratic-Republican) 34.0%; ▌Leverett Saltonstall I (Federalist) 27.4%; Second ballot (January 8, 1821): ▌Gideon Barstow (Democratic-Republican) 48.4%; ▌John Hooper (Federalist) 28.1%; ▌Willard Peele (Independent) 10.1%; ▌Charles Saunders (Unknown) 9.1%; Others 4.4%; Third ballot (April 16, 1821): ▌ ✓ Gideon Barstow (Democratic-Republican) 53.9%; ▌Timothy Pickering (Federalist) 44.7%; Others 1.4%
Massachusetts 3	Jeremiah Nelson	Federalist	1804; 1806 (retired); 1814	Incumbent re-elected.	▌ ✓ Jeremiah Nelson (Federalist) 85.7%; ▌Amos Spaulding (Unknown) 12.6%; Others 1.7%
Massachusetts 4	Timothy Fuller	Democratic- Republican	1816	Incumbent re-elected.	▌ ✓ Timothy Fuller (Democratic-Republican) 58.2%; ▌John Hart (Democratic-Republican) 20.9%; ▌Samuel P. Fay (Federalist) 17.8%; Others 3.1%
Massachusetts 5	Samuel Lathrop	Federalist	1819	Incumbent re-elected.	▌ ✓ Samuel Lathrop (Federalist) 73.7%; ▌Thomas Shepherd (Democratic-Republican) 26.3%
Massachusetts 6	Samuel C. Allen	Federalist	1816	Incumbent re-elected.	▌ ✓ Samuel C. Allen (Federalist) 92.4%; Others 7.6%
Massachusetts 7	Henry Shaw	Democratic- Republican	1816	Incumbent retired. Federalist gain.	▌ ✓ Henry W. Dwight (Federalist) 51.4%; ▌William P. Walker (Democratic-Republican) 43.9%; Others 4.7%
Massachusetts 8	Zabdiel Sampson	Democratic- Republican	1816	Incumbent resigned July 26, 1820. Democratic-Republican hold.	▌ ✓ Aaron Hobart (Democratic-Republican) 54.4%; ▌William Baylies (Federalist) 45.6%
Massachusetts 9	Walter Folger Jr.	Democratic- Republican	1816	Incumbent lost re-election. Federalist gain.	▌ ✓ John Reed Jr. (Federalist) 65.9%; ▌Walter Folger Jr. (Democratic-Republican) 22.9%; Others 11.2%
Massachusetts 10	Marcus Morton	Democratic- Republican	1816	Incumbent lost re-election. Federalist gain	▌ ✓ Francis Baylies (Federalist) 52.5%; ▌Marcus Morton (Democratic-Republican) 47.5%
Massachusetts 11	Benjamin Adams	Federalist	1816	Incumbent lost re-election. Democratic-Republican gain.	▌ ✓ Jonathan Russell (Democratic-Republican) 52.9%; ▌Benjamin Adams (Federalist) 42.9%; Others 4.2%
Massachusetts 12	Jonas Kendall	Federalist	1818	Incumbent lost re-election. Federalist hold.	▌ ✓ Lewis Bigelow (Federalist) 51.7%; ▌Edmund Cushing (Democratic-Republican) 26.1%; ▌Jonas Kendall (Federalist) 22.1%
Massachusetts 13	William Eustis	Democratic- Republican	1800; 1804 (lost); 1820 (special)	Incumbent re-elected.	▌ ✓ William Eustis (Democratic-Republican) 65.0%; ▌James Richardson (Federalist) 30.7%; ▌Richard Sullivan (Federalist) 4.3%

== Michigan Territory ==
See Non-voting delegates, below.

== Mississippi ==
Mississippi elected its member August 7–8, 1820.

District	Incumbent			This race	
District	Member	Party	First elected	Results	Candidates
Mississippi at-large	Christopher Rankin	Democratic-Republican	1819	Incumbent re-elected.	▌ ✓ Christopher Rankin (Democratic-Republican) 100%

== Missouri ==
Missouri was admitted to the union on August 10, 1821, but elections had been held August 28, 1820.

District	Incumbent			This race	
District	Member	Party	First elected	Results	Candidates
Missouri at-large	None (new state)			New seat. Territorial delegate re-elected as new member. Democratic-Republican gain.	▌ ✓ John Scott (Democratic-Republican) 93.6%; ▌James Caldwell (Democratic-Republican) 6.4%

== New Hampshire ==
New Hampshire elected its members August 18, 1820.

District	Incumbent			This race	
District	Member	Party	First elected	Results	Candidates
New Hampshire at-large 6 seats on a general ticket	Josiah Butler	Democratic-Republican	1816	Incumbent re-elected.	▌ ✓ William Plumer Jr. (Democratic-Republican) 16.6%; ▌ ✓ Nathaniel Upham (Democratic-Republican) 16.5%; ▌ ✓ Josiah Butler (Democratic-Republican) 16.2%; ▌ ✓ Matthew Harvey (Democratic-Republican) 14.9%; ▌ ✓ Aaron Matson (Democratic-Republican) 14.2%; ▌ ✓ Thomas Whipple Jr. (Democratic-Republican) 10.6%; ▌Arthur Livermore (Democratic-Republican) 5.9%; ▌Levi Jackson (Federalist) 2.7%; ▌Clifton Clagett (Democratic-Republican) 2.2%
New Hampshire at-large 6 seats on a general ticket	Nathaniel Upham	Democratic-Republican	1816	Incumbent re-elected.	▌ ✓ William Plumer Jr. (Democratic-Republican) 16.6%; ▌ ✓ Nathaniel Upham (Democratic-Republican) 16.5%; ▌ ✓ Josiah Butler (Democratic-Republican) 16.2%; ▌ ✓ Matthew Harvey (Democratic-Republican) 14.9%; ▌ ✓ Aaron Matson (Democratic-Republican) 14.2%; ▌ ✓ Thomas Whipple Jr. (Democratic-Republican) 10.6%; ▌Arthur Livermore (Democratic-Republican) 5.9%; ▌Levi Jackson (Federalist) 2.7%; ▌Clifton Clagett (Democratic-Republican) 2.2%
New Hampshire at-large 6 seats on a general ticket	Clifton Clagett	Democratic-Republican	1802; 1804 (retired); 1816	Incumbent lost re-election. Democratic-Republican hold.	▌ ✓ William Plumer Jr. (Democratic-Republican) 16.6%; ▌ ✓ Nathaniel Upham (Democratic-Republican) 16.5%; ▌ ✓ Josiah Butler (Democratic-Republican) 16.2%; ▌ ✓ Matthew Harvey (Democratic-Republican) 14.9%; ▌ ✓ Aaron Matson (Democratic-Republican) 14.2%; ▌ ✓ Thomas Whipple Jr. (Democratic-Republican) 10.6%; ▌Arthur Livermore (Democratic-Republican) 5.9%; ▌Levi Jackson (Federalist) 2.7%; ▌Clifton Clagett (Democratic-Republican) 2.2%
New Hampshire at-large 6 seats on a general ticket	Joseph Buffum Jr.	Democratic-Republican	1819	Incumbent retired. Democratic-Republican hold.	▌ ✓ William Plumer Jr. (Democratic-Republican) 16.6%; ▌ ✓ Nathaniel Upham (Democratic-Republican) 16.5%; ▌ ✓ Josiah Butler (Democratic-Republican) 16.2%; ▌ ✓ Matthew Harvey (Democratic-Republican) 14.9%; ▌ ✓ Aaron Matson (Democratic-Republican) 14.2%; ▌ ✓ Thomas Whipple Jr. (Democratic-Republican) 10.6%; ▌Arthur Livermore (Democratic-Republican) 5.9%; ▌Levi Jackson (Federalist) 2.7%; ▌Clifton Clagett (Democratic-Republican) 2.2%
New Hampshire at-large 6 seats on a general ticket	William Plumer Jr.	Democratic-Republican	1819	Incumbent re-elected.	▌ ✓ William Plumer Jr. (Democratic-Republican) 16.6%; ▌ ✓ Nathaniel Upham (Democratic-Republican) 16.5%; ▌ ✓ Josiah Butler (Democratic-Republican) 16.2%; ▌ ✓ Matthew Harvey (Democratic-Republican) 14.9%; ▌ ✓ Aaron Matson (Democratic-Republican) 14.2%; ▌ ✓ Thomas Whipple Jr. (Democratic-Republican) 10.6%; ▌Arthur Livermore (Democratic-Republican) 5.9%; ▌Levi Jackson (Federalist) 2.7%; ▌Clifton Clagett (Democratic-Republican) 2.2%
New Hampshire at-large 6 seats on a general ticket	Arthur Livermore	Democratic-Republican	1816	Incumbent lost re-election. Democratic-Republican hold.	▌ ✓ William Plumer Jr. (Democratic-Republican) 16.6%; ▌ ✓ Nathaniel Upham (Democratic-Republican) 16.5%; ▌ ✓ Josiah Butler (Democratic-Republican) 16.2%; ▌ ✓ Matthew Harvey (Democratic-Republican) 14.9%; ▌ ✓ Aaron Matson (Democratic-Republican) 14.2%; ▌ ✓ Thomas Whipple Jr. (Democratic-Republican) 10.6%; ▌Arthur Livermore (Democratic-Republican) 5.9%; ▌Levi Jackson (Federalist) 2.7%; ▌Clifton Clagett (Democratic-Republican) 2.2%

== New Jersey ==
New Jersey elected its members November 7, 1820. There were an unusually large number of candidates, 119 candidates according to one contemporary newspaper. Some candidates ran under an "Anti-Caucus" ticket. Only 1 of the 6 six incumbents would serve in the next term, as 4 retired and 1 died after re-election.

District	Incumbent			This race	
District	Member	Party	First elected	Results	Candidates
New Jersey at-large 6 seats on a general ticket	Ephraim Bateman	Democratic-Republican	1814	Incumbent re-elected.	▌ ✓ Ephraim Bateman (Democratic-Republican) 16.4%; ▌ ✓ George Holcombe (Democratic-Republican) 15.1%; ▌ ✓ George Cassedy (Democratic-Republican) 14.0%; ▌ ✓ Samuel Swan (Democratic-Republican) 13.9%; ▌ ✓ John Linn (Democratic-Republican) 12.2%; ▌ ✓ James Matlack (Democratic-Republican) 11.7%; ▌Lewis Condict (D-R Anti-Caucus) 5.6%; ▌John Rutherford (D-R Anti-Caucus) 1.7%; ▌James Parker (Federalist) 1.5%; ▌Joseph McIlvaine (D-R Anti-Caucus) 1.4%; ▌Samuel L. Southard (D-R Anti-Caucus) 1.4%; ▌Joseph Hopkinson (D-R Anti-Caucus) 1.1%; ▌John Frelinghuysen (Federalist Anti-Caucus) 1.1%; Others 2.9%
New Jersey at-large 6 seats on a general ticket	John Linn	Democratic-Republican	1816	Incumbent re-elected but died January 5, 1821, leading to an October 8, 1821 special election.	
New Jersey at-large 6 seats on a general ticket	Bernard Smith	Democratic-Republican	1818	Incumbent retired. Democratic-Republican hold.	
New Jersey at-large 6 seats on a general ticket	Henry Southard	Democratic-Republican	1814	Incumbent retired. Democratic-Republican hold.	
New Jersey at-large 6 seats on a general ticket	Joseph Bloomfield	Democratic-Republican	1816	Incumbent retired. Democratic-Republican hold.	
New Jersey at-large 6 seats on a general ticket	Charles Kinsey	Democratic-Republican	1816; 1818 (lost); 1820 (special)	Incumbent retired. Democratic-Republican hold.	

== New York ==
New York elected its members April 24–26, 1821, after the term began but before the new Congress convened. The 21st district, previously a plural district with two seats, was divided into two single-member districts for the 17th Congress, the 21st and 22nd.

The Democratic-Republican party in New York was divided between "Bucktails" and "Clintonians". The Clintonians ran on a joint ticket with the remaining Federalists. In a few cases, marked as "Clintonian/Federalist" below, it is unclear whether a candidate on the joint ticket was Democratic-Republican or Federalist.

Only five of the twenty-seven incumbents were re-elected to the next term. Sixteen incumbents retired and five lost re-election. Despite this high turnover of membership, there was only a one-seat net gain for the Federalists.

District	Incumbent			This race	
District	Member	Party	First elected	Results	Candidates
New York 1 Plural district with 2 seats	Silas Wood	Federalist	1818	Incumbent re-elected.	▌ ✓ Silas Wood (Federalist) 27.1%; ▌ ✓ Peter Sharpe (Democratic-Republican) 23.1% (Note: In New York's 1st district, the winners were initially declared to be Silas Wood (Federalist) and Peter Sharpe (Democratic-Republican). Sharpe's election was challenged. Initial returns showed 3,339 votes for Cadwallader D. Colden (Federalist), with 395 for "Cadwallader Colden" and 220 for "Cadwallader D. Colder". After those votes were declared to be for Cadwallader D. Colden, he finished in 2nd place with 3,954 votes (27.1%), and thus received one of the two seats for that district in place of Sharpe. He was seated December 12, 1821.); ▌Cadwallader D. Colden (Federalist) 22.9%; ▌Joshua Smith (Democratic-Republican) 22.8%; "Cadwallader Colden" 2.7%; "Cadwallader D. Colder" 1.5%
New York 1 Plural district with 2 seats	James Guyon Jr.	Democratic- Republican	1818	Incumbent retired. Democratic-Republican hold.	▌ ✓ Silas Wood (Federalist) 27.1%; ▌ ✓ Peter Sharpe (Democratic-Republican) 23.1%; ▌Cadwallader D. Colden (Federalist) 22.9%; ▌Joshua Smith (Democratic-Republican) 22.8%; "Cadwallader Colden" 2.7%; "Cadwallader D. Colder" 1.5%
New York 1 Plural district with 2 seats	James Guyon Jr.	Democratic- Republican	1818	Election successfully contested. Federalist gain.	▌ ✓ Cadwallader D. Colden (Federalist); ▌Peter Sharpe (Democratic-Republican)
New York 2 Plural district with 2 seats	Henry Meigs	Democratic- Republican	1818	Incumbent retired. Democratic-Republican hold.	▌ ✓ John J. Morgan (Democratic-Republican) 49.5%; ▌ ✓ Churchill C. Cambreleng (Democratic-Republican) 29.6%; ▌Henry Eckford (Clintonian/Federalist) 20.9%
New York 2 Plural district with 2 seats	Peter H. Wendover	Democratic- Republican	1814	Incumbent retired. Democratic-Republican hold.	▌ ✓ John J. Morgan (Democratic-Republican) 49.5%; ▌ ✓ Churchill C. Cambreleng (Democratic-Republican) 29.6%; ▌Henry Eckford (Clintonian/Federalist) 20.9%
New York 3	Caleb Tompkins	Democratic- Republican	1816	Incumbent retired. Democratic-Republican hold.	▌ ✓ Jeremiah H. Pierson (Democratic-Republican) 59.2%; ▌John T. Smith (Clintonian/Federalist) 37.7%; ▌Peter S. Van Orden (Democratic-Republican) 9.4%
New York 4	Randall S. Street	Federalist	1818	Incumbent retired. Democratic-Republican gain.	▌ ✓ William W. Van Wyck (Democratic-Republican) 56.8%; ▌William Taber (Clintonian/Federalist) 43.2%
New York 5	James Strong	Federalist	1818	Incumbent retired. Federalist hold.	▌ ✓ Walter Patterson (Federalist) 57.8%; ▌Philip J. Schuyler (Democratic-Republican) 42.0%
New York 6	Walter Case	Democratic- Republican	1818	Incumbent retired. Democratic-Republican hold. Successor died September 7, 1821, before the Congress convened, leading to a special election.	▌ ✓ Selah Tuthill (Democratic-Republican) 61.6%; ▌James W. Wilkin (Democratic-Republican) 38.3%
New York 7	Jacob H. De Witt	Democratic- Republican	1818	Incumbent retired. Federalist gain.	▌ ✓ Charles H. Ruggles (Federalist) 54.6%; ▌William Gillespie (Democratic-Republican) 45.3%
New York 8	Robert Clark	Democratic- Republican	1818	Incumbent retired. Democratic-Republican hold.	▌ ✓ Richard McCarty (Democratic-Republican) 58.8%; ▌Jacob Haight (Democratic-Republican) 41.1%
New York 9	Solomon Van Rensselaer	Federalist	1818	Incumbent re-elected.	▌ ✓ Solomon Van Rensselaer (Federalist) 57.1%; ▌Harmanus Bleecker (Democratic-Republican) 42.8%
New York 10	John D. Dickinson	Federalist	1818	Incumbent re-elected.	▌ ✓ John D. Dickinson (Federalist) 55.5%; ▌James L. Hogeboom (Democratic-Republican) 42.4%; ▌Simon Newcomb (Clintonian/Federalist) 2.0%
New York 11	John W. Taylor	Democratic- Republican	1812	Incumbent re-elected.	▌ ✓ John W. Taylor (Democratic-Republican) 53.3%; ▌Guert Van Schoonhoven (Democratic-Republican) 46.5%
New York 12 Plural district with 2 seats	Nathaniel Pitcher	Democratic- Republican	1818	Incumbent re-elected.	▌ ✓ Reuben H. Walworth (Democratic-Republican) 27.9%; ▌ ✓ Nathaniel Pitcher (Democratic-Republican) 26.1%; ▌John Crary (Clintonian/Federalist) 23.5%; ▌Ezra C. Gross (Democratic-Republican) 22.5%
New York 12 Plural district with 2 seats	Ezra C. Gross	Democratic- Republican	1818	Incumbent lost re-election. Democratic-Republican hold.	▌ ✓ Reuben H. Walworth (Democratic-Republican) 27.9%; ▌ ✓ Nathaniel Pitcher (Democratic-Republican) 26.1%; ▌John Crary (Clintonian/Federalist) 23.5%; ▌Ezra C. Gross (Democratic-Republican) 22.5%
New York 13	Harmanus Peek	Democratic- Republican	1818	Incumbent retired. Democratic-Republican hold.	▌ ✓ John Gebhard (Democratic-Republican) 51.0%; ▌William Mann (Democratic-Republican) 49.0%
New York 14	John Fay	Democratic- Republican	1818	Incumbent retired. Democratic-Republican hold.	▌ ✓ Alfred Conkling (Democratic-Republican) 52.4%; ▌John Herkimer (Democratic-Republican) 47.6%
New York 15 Plural district with 2 seats	Robert Monell	Democratic- Republican	1818	Incumbent lost re-election. Democratic-Republican hold.	▌ ✓ James Hawkes (Democratic-Republican) 28.5%; ▌ ✓ Samuel Campbell (Democratic-Republican) 27.8%; ▌Robert Monell (Democratic-Republican) 22.3%; ▌Alvan Stewart (Clintonian/Federalist) 21.5%
New York 15 Plural district with 2 seats	Joseph S. Lyman	Democratic- Republican	1818	Incumbent retired. Democratic-Republican hold.	▌ ✓ James Hawkes (Democratic-Republican) 28.5%; ▌ ✓ Samuel Campbell (Democratic-Republican) 27.8%; ▌Robert Monell (Democratic-Republican) 22.3%; ▌Alvan Stewart (Clintonian/Federalist) 21.5%
New York 16	Henry R. Storrs	Federalist	1816	Incumbent retired. Federalist hold.	▌ ✓ Joseph Kirkland (Federalist) 56.5%; ▌Nathan Williams (Democratic-Republican) 43.4%
New York 17	Aaron Hackley Jr.	Democratic- Republican	1818	Incumbent retired. Democratic-Republican hold.	▌ ✓ Thomas H. Hubbard (Democratic-Republican) 51.0%; ▌David Woods (Democratic-Republican) 48.9%
New York 18	William D. Ford	Democratic- Republican	1818	Incumbent retired. Federalist gain.	▌ ✓ Micah Sterling (Federalist) 52.3%; ▌Perley Keyes (Democratic-Republican) 47.3%
New York 19	George Hall	Democratic- Republican	1818	Incumbent lost re-election. Democratic-Republican hold.	▌ ✓ Elisha Litchfield (Democratic-Republican) 51.4%; ▌George Hall (Democratic-Republican) 48.5%
New York 20 Plural district with 2 seats	Jonathan Richmond	Democratic- Republican	1818	Incumbent lost re-election. Democratic-Republican hold.	▌ ✓ William B. Rochester (Democratic-Republican) 29.6%; ▌ ✓ David Woodcock (Democratic-Republican) 24.7%; ▌Jonathan Richmond (Democratic-Republican) 23.9%; ▌Herman Camp (Democratic-Republican) 21.8%
New York 20 Plural district with 2 seats	Caleb Baker	Democratic- Republican	1818	Incumbent retired. Democratic-Republican hold.	▌ ✓ William B. Rochester (Democratic-Republican) 29.6%; ▌ ✓ David Woodcock (Democratic-Republican) 24.7%; ▌Jonathan Richmond (Democratic-Republican) 23.9%; ▌Herman Camp (Democratic-Republican) 21.8%
New York 21	Nathaniel Allen	Democratic- Republican	1818	Incumbent lost re-election. Democratic-Republican hold.	▌ ✓ Elijah Spencer (Democratic-Republican) 49.6%; ▌Nathaniel Allen (Democratic-Republican) 48.6%; ▌Daniel W. Lewis (Clintonian/Federalist) 1.7%
New York 22	Albert H. Tracy; Redistricted from the 21st district	Democratic- Republican	1818	Incumbent re-elected.	▌ ✓ Albert H. Tracy (Democratic-Republican) 50.8%; ▌Benjamin Ellicott (Democratic-Republican) 49.2%

== North Carolina ==
North Carolina elected its members August 9, 1821, after the term began but before the new Congress convened.

District	Incumbent			This race	
District	Member	Party	First elected	Results	Candidates
North Carolina 1	Lemuel Sawyer	Democratic-Republican	1806; 1813 (lost); 1817	Incumbent re-elected.	▌ ✓ Lemuel Sawyer (Democratic-Republican) 63.5%; ▌James Iredell Jr. (Federalist) 24.6%; ▌Thomas Williams (Democratic-Republican) 11.9%
North Carolina 2	Hutchins G. Burton	Democratic-Republican	1819	Incumbent re-elected.	▌ ✓ Hutchins G. Burton (Democratic-Republican) 100%
North Carolina 3	Thomas H. Hall	Democratic-Republican	1817	Incumbent re-elected.	▌ ✓ Thomas H. Hall (Democratic-Republican) 53.0%; ▌William Clarke (Federalist) 47.0%
North Carolina 4	William S. Blackledge	Federalist	1821 (special)	Incumbent re-elected as a Democratic-Republican. Democratic-Republican gain.	▌ ✓ William S. Blackledge (Democratic-Republican) 61.5%; ▌John P. Daves (Federalist) 38.5%
North Carolina 5	Charles Hooks	Democratic-Republican	1816 (special); 1817 (lost); 1819	Incumbent re-elected.	▌ ✓ Charles Hooks (Democratic-Republican) 65.3%; ▌Daniel Glisson (Federalist) 34.7%
North Carolina 6	Weldon N. Edwards	Democratic-Republican	1816 (special)	Incumbent re-elected.	▌ ✓ Weldon N. Edwards (Democratic-Republican) 99.3%; Others 0.7%
North Carolina 7	John Culpepper	Federalist	1806; 1808 (contested); 1808 (special); 1813; 1816 (lost); 1819	Incumbent lost re-election. Federalist hold.	▌ ✓ Archibald McNeill (Federalist) 52.4%; ▌John Culpepper (Federalist) 47.6%
North Carolina 8	James S. Smith	Democratic-Republican	1817	Incumbent retired. Democratic-Republican hold.	▌ ✓ Josiah Crudup (Democratic-Republican); ▌John Scott (Federalist)
North Carolina 9	Thomas Settle	Democratic-Republican	1817	Incumbent retired. Democratic-Republican hold.	▌ ✓ Romulus M. Saunders (Democratic-Republican)
North Carolina 10	Charles Fisher	Democratic-Republican	1819 (special)	Incumbent retired. Democratic-Republican hold.	▌ ✓ John Long (Democratic-Republican); ▌John L. Henderson (Federalist)
North Carolina 11	William Davidson	Federalist	1818 (special)	Incumbent lost re-election. Democratic-Republican gain.	▌ ✓ Henry W. Connor (Democratic-Republican) 52.9%; ▌William Davidson (Federalist) 47.1%
North Carolina 12	Felix Walker	Democratic-Republican	1817	Incumbent re-elected.	▌ ✓ Felix Walker (Democratic-Republican) 62.1%; ▌Robert B. Vance (Democratic-Republican) 37.9%
North Carolina 13	Lewis Williams	Democratic-Republican	1815	Incumbent re-elected.	▌ ✓ Lewis Williams (Democratic-Republican)

== Ohio ==
Ohio elected its members October 10, 1820.

District	Incumbent			This race	
District	Member	Party	First elected	Results	Candidates
Ohio 1	Thomas R. Ross	Democratic-Republican	1818	Incumbent re-elected.	▌ ✓ Thomas R. Ross (Democratic-Republican) 100%
Ohio 2	John W. Campbell	Democratic-Republican	1816	Incumbent re-elected.	▌ ✓ John W. Campbell (Democratic-Republican) 100%
Ohio 3	Henry Brush	Democratic-Republican	1818	Incumbent lost re-election. Democratic-Republican hold.	▌ ✓ Levi Barber (Democratic-Republican) 37.8%; ▌Henry Brush (Democratic-Republican) 32.9%; ▌Thomas Scott (Democratic-Republican) 29.3%
Ohio 4	Samuel Herrick	Democratic-Republican	1816	Incumbent retired. Democratic-Republican hold. Winner declined to serve, leading to a special election.	▌ ✓ John C. Wright (Democratic-Republican) 50.1%; ▌David Chambers (Democratic-Republican) 49.9%
Ohio 5	Philemon Beecher	Federalist	1816	Incumbent lost re-election. Democratic-Republican gain.	▌ ✓ Joseph Vance (Democratic-Republican) 40.9% (Note: Based on incomplete returns); ▌Philemon Beecher (Federalist) 44.6%; ▌Daniel Smith (Federalist) 7.9%; ▌Orris Parrish (Democratic-Republican) 6.3%; ▌John Kilbourn (Unknown) 0.3%
Ohio 6	John Sloane	Democratic-Republican	1818	Incumbent re-elected.	▌ ✓ John Sloane (Democratic-Republican) 91.7%; ▌Alred Kelley (Democratic-Republican) 8.2%; Others 0.1%

== Pennsylvania ==
Pennsylvania elected its members October 10, 1820.

District	Incumbent			This race	
District	Member	Party	First elected	Results	Candidates
Pennsylvania 1 Plural district with 4 seats	Joseph Hemphill	Federalist	1800; 1802 (lost); 1818	Incumbent re-elected.	▌ ✓ John Sergeant (Federalist) 24.8% (Note: John Sergeant was also supported by the Democratic-Republicans.); ▌ ✓ Joseph Hemphill (Federalist) 15.1%; ▌ ✓ William Milnor (Federalist) 14.8%; ▌ ✓ Samuel Edwards (Federalist) 13.6%; ▌Thomas Forrest (Federalist) 10.5%; ▌Nicholas Biddle (Democratic-Republican) 10.5%; ▌Joseph Engle (Democratic-Republican) 9.9%; ▌Gideon Humphrey (Unknown) 0.8%
Pennsylvania 1 Plural district with 4 seats	Samuel Edwards	Federalist	1818	Incumbent re-elected.	▌ ✓ John Sergeant (Federalist) 24.8%; ▌ ✓ Joseph Hemphill (Federalist) 15.1%; ▌ ✓ William Milnor (Federalist) 14.8%; ▌ ✓ Samuel Edwards (Federalist) 13.6%; ▌Thomas Forrest (Federalist) 10.5%; ▌Nicholas Biddle (Democratic-Republican) 10.5%; ▌Joseph Engle (Democratic-Republican) 9.9%; ▌Gideon Humphrey (Unknown) 0.8%
Pennsylvania 1 Plural district with 4 seats	Thomas Forrest	Federalist	1818	Incumbent lost re-election. Federalist hold.	▌ ✓ John Sergeant (Federalist) 24.8%; ▌ ✓ Joseph Hemphill (Federalist) 15.1%; ▌ ✓ William Milnor (Federalist) 14.8%; ▌ ✓ Samuel Edwards (Federalist) 13.6%; ▌Thomas Forrest (Federalist) 10.5%; ▌Nicholas Biddle (Democratic-Republican) 10.5%; ▌Joseph Engle (Democratic-Republican) 9.9%; ▌Gideon Humphrey (Unknown) 0.8%
Pennsylvania 1 Plural district with 4 seats	John Sergeant	Federalist	1815 (special)	Incumbent re-elected.	▌ ✓ John Sergeant (Federalist) 24.8%; ▌ ✓ Joseph Hemphill (Federalist) 15.1%; ▌ ✓ William Milnor (Federalist) 14.8%; ▌ ✓ Samuel Edwards (Federalist) 13.6%; ▌Thomas Forrest (Federalist) 10.5%; ▌Nicholas Biddle (Democratic-Republican) 10.5%; ▌Joseph Engle (Democratic-Republican) 9.9%; ▌Gideon Humphrey (Unknown) 0.8%
Pennsylvania 2 Plural district with 2 seats	William Darlington	Democratic- Republican	1814; 1816 (lost); 1818	Incumbent re-elected.	▌ ✓ William Darlington (Democratic-Republican) 26.1%; ▌ ✓ Samuel Gross (Democratic-Republican) 26.0%; ▌Charles Miner (Federalist) 24.1%; ▌John Henderson (Federalist) 23.8%
Pennsylvania 2 Plural district with 2 seats	Samuel Gross	Democratic- Republican	1818	Incumbent re-elected.	▌ ✓ William Darlington (Democratic-Republican) 26.1%; ▌ ✓ Samuel Gross (Democratic-Republican) 26.0%; ▌Charles Miner (Federalist) 24.1%; ▌John Henderson (Federalist) 23.8%
Pennsylvania 3 Plural district with 2 seats	James M. Wallace	Democratic- Republican	1815 (special)	Incumbent lost re-election. Federalist gain.	▌ ✓ James Buchanan (Federalist) 27.9%; ▌ ✓ John Phillips (Federalist) 27.5%; ▌Jacob Hibshman (Democratic-Republican) 22.8%; ▌James M. Wallace (Democratic-Republican) 21.8%
Pennsylvania 3 Plural district with 2 seats	Jacob Hibshman	Democratic- Republican	1818	Incumbent lost re-election. Federalist gain.	▌ ✓ James Buchanan (Federalist) 27.9%; ▌ ✓ John Phillips (Federalist) 27.5%; ▌Jacob Hibshman (Democratic-Republican) 22.8%; ▌James M. Wallace (Democratic-Republican) 21.8%
Pennsylvania 4	Jacob Hostetter	Democratic- Republican	1818	Incumbent lost re-election. Democratic-Republican hold.	▌ ✓ James S. Mitchell (Democratic-Republican) 54.4%; ▌Jacob Hostetter (Federalist) 45.6% (Note: Changed parties)
Pennsylvania 5 Plural district with 2 seats	Andrew Boden	Democratic- Republican	1816	Incumbent retired. Democratic-Republican hold.	▌ ✓ James McSherry (Democratic-Republican) 27.2%; ▌ ✓ James Duncan (Democratic-Republican) 26.4%; ▌James Wilson (Federalist) 23.1%; ▌Isaiah Graham (Federalist) 22.8%; ▌Robert K. Lowry (Independent) 0.6%
Pennsylvania 5 Plural district with 2 seats	David Fullerton	Democratic- Republican	1818	Incumbent resigned May 15, 1820. Democratic-Republican hold. Successor was not a candidate in the same day's election to finish the term. Successor resigned in April 1821, leading to a special election.	▌ ✓ James McSherry (Democratic-Republican) 27.2%; ▌ ✓ James Duncan (Democratic-Republican) 26.4%; ▌James Wilson (Federalist) 23.1%; ▌Isaiah Graham (Federalist) 22.8%; ▌Robert K. Lowry (Independent) 0.6%
Pennsylvania 6 Plural district with 2 seats	Samuel Moore	Democratic- Republican	1818	Incumbent re-elected.	▌ ✓ Samuel Moore (Democratic-Republican) 30.7%; ▌ ✓ Thomas J. Rogers (Democratic-Republican) 28.6%; ▌Daniel W. Dingman (Federalist) 21.1%; ▌Matthais Morris (Federalist) 19.6%
Pennsylvania 6 Plural district with 2 seats	Thomas J. Rogers	Democratic- Republican	1818 (special)	Incumbent re-elected.	▌ ✓ Samuel Moore (Democratic-Republican) 30.7%; ▌ ✓ Thomas J. Rogers (Democratic-Republican) 28.6%; ▌Daniel W. Dingman (Federalist) 21.1%; ▌Matthais Morris (Federalist) 19.6%
Pennsylvania 7	Joseph Hiester	Democratic- Republican	1798; 1804 (retired); 1814	Incumbent retired to run for Governor of Pennsylvania. Federalist gain. Incumbent then resigned in December 1820 when elected Governor of Pennsylvania and successor lost the special election to finish the term.	▌ ✓ Ludwig Worman (Federalist) 55.5%; ▌Gabriel Hiester (Democratic-Republican) 44.5%
Pennsylvania 8	Robert Philson	Democratic- Republican	1818	Incumbent lost re-election. Democratic-Republican hold.	▌ ✓ John Tod (Democratic-Republican) 75.7%; ▌Robert Philson (Federalist) 24.3%
Pennsylvania 9	William P. Maclay	Democratic- Republican	1816	Incumbent lost re-election. Democratic-Republican hold.	▌ ✓ John Brown (Democratic-Republican) 54.6%; ▌William P. Maclay (Democratic-Republican) 45.4%
Pennsylvania 10 Plural district with 2 seats	George Denison	Democratic- Republican	1818	Incumbent re-elected.	▌ ✓ George Denison (Democratic-Republican) 34.0%; ▌ ✓ William Cox Ellis (Federalist) 23.3%; ▌Abiel Fellows (Federalist) 16.1%; ▌Thomas Murray (Democratic-Republican) 15.7%; ▌Thomas Murray Jr. (Democratic-Republican) 11.0%
Pennsylvania 10 Plural district with 2 seats	John Murray	Democratic- Republican	1817 (special)	Incumbent retired. Federalist gain. Incumbent resigned July 20, 1821, leading to a special election.	▌ ✓ George Denison (Democratic-Republican) 34.0%; ▌ ✓ William Cox Ellis (Federalist) 23.3%; ▌Abiel Fellows (Federalist) 16.1%; ▌Thomas Murray (Democratic-Republican) 15.7%; ▌Thomas Murray Jr. (Democratic-Republican) 11.0%
Pennsylvania 11	David Marchand	Democratic- Republican	1816	Incumbent retired. Democratic-Republican hold.	▌ ✓ George Plumer (Democratic-Republican) 54.7%; ▌Alexander W. Foster (Federalist) 45.3%
Pennsylvania 12	Thomas Patterson	Democratic- Republican	1816	Incumbent re-elected.	▌ ✓ Thomas Patterson (Democratic-Republican) 67.3%; ▌Thomas McGiffen (Federalist) 32.7%
Pennsylvania 13	Christian Tarr	Democratic- Republican	1816	Incumbent lost re-election. Democratic-Republican hold.	▌ ✓ Andrew Stewart (Democratic-Republican) 48.3%; ▌Christian Tarr (Democratic-Republican) 40.1%; ▌Charles Porter (Federalist) 11.6%
Pennsylvania 14	Henry Baldwin	Democratic- Republican	1816	Incumbent re-elected.	▌ ✓ Henry Baldwin (Democratic-Republican) 63.8%; ▌William Marks (Federalist) 36.2%
Pennsylvania 15	Robert Moore	Democratic- Republican	1816	Incumbent lost re-election. Democratic-Republican hold.	▌ ✓ Patrick Farrelly (Democratic-Republican) 53.7%; ▌Robert Moore (Federalist) 43.4%; ▌Beven Pearson (Unknown) 2.9%

== Rhode Island ==
Rhode Island elected its members August 29, 1820.

District	Incumbent			This race	
District	Member	Party	First elected	Results	Candidates
Rhode Island at-large 2 seats on a general ticket	Samuel Eddy	Democratic-Republican	1818	Incumbent re-elected.	▌ ✓ Job Durfee (Democratic-Republican) 31.5% (Note: Job Durfee received votes in many towns from Federalists.); ▌ ✓ Samuel Eddy (Democratic-Republican) 25.5%; ▌Samuel Bridgham (Federalist) 24.5%; ▌Nathaniel Hazard (Democratic-Republican) 17.9%; Others 0.6%
Rhode Island at-large 2 seats on a general ticket	Nathaniel Hazard	Democratic-Republican	1818	Incumbent lost re-election. Democratic-Republican hold. Incumbent died December 17, 1820, and seat remained vacant until the end of term.	▌ ✓ Job Durfee (Democratic-Republican) 31.5%; ▌ ✓ Samuel Eddy (Democratic-Republican) 25.5%; ▌Samuel Bridgham (Federalist) 24.5%; ▌Nathaniel Hazard (Democratic-Republican) 17.9%; Others 0.6%

== South Carolina ==
South Carolina elected its members October 9–10, 1820.

District	Incumbent			This race	
District	Member	Party	First elected	Results	Candidates
South Carolina 1	Charles Pinckney	Democratic-Republican	1818	Incumbent retired. Democratic-Republican hold.	▌ ✓ Joel R. Poinsett (Democratic-Republican) 52.1%; ▌John Geddes (Democratic-Republican) 47.9%
South Carolina 2	William Lowndes	Democratic-Republican	1810	Incumbent re-elected.	▌ ✓ William Lowndes (Democratic-Republican) 100%
South Carolina 3	James Ervin	Democratic-Republican	1816	Incumbent retired. Democratic-Republican hold.	▌ ✓ Thomas R. Mitchell (Democratic-Republican) 49.5%; ▌Benjamin Huger (Federalist) 39.2%; ▌John R. Wilson (Democratic-Republican) 11.3%
South Carolina 4	James Overstreet	Democratic-Republican	1818	Incumbent re-elected.	▌ ✓ James Overstreet (Democratic-Republican) 70.3%; ▌John M. Felder (Federalist) 29.7%
South Carolina 5	Starling Tucker	Democratic-Republican	1816	Incumbent re-elected.	▌ ✓ Starling Tucker (Democratic-Republican); ▌William Strother (Democratic-Republican)
South Carolina 6	Eldred Simkins	Democratic-Republican	1818 (special)	Incumbent retired. Democratic-Republican hold.	▌ ✓ George McDuffie (Democratic-Republican) 100%
South Carolina 7	Elias Earle	Democratic-Republican	1804; 1814 (lost); 1816	Incumbent lost re-election. Democratic-Republican hold.	▌ ✓ John Wilson (Democratic-Republican) 55.8%; ▌Elias Earle (Democratic-Republican) 44.2%
South Carolina 8	John McCreary	Democratic-Republican	1818	Incumbent lost re-election. Democratic-Republican hold.	▌ ✓ Joseph Gist (Democratic-Republican) 50.7%; ▌John McCreary (Democratic-Republican) 49.3%
South Carolina 9	Joseph Brevard	Democratic-Republican	1818	Incumbent retired. Democratic-Republican hold. Winner declined to serve, leading to a special election sometime in 1821.	▌ ✓ John S. Richards (Democratic-Republican) 100%

== Tennessee ==
Tennessee elected its members August 9–10, 1821, after the term began but before the new Congress convened.

District	Incumbent			This race	
District	Member	Party	First elected	Results	Candidates
Tennessee 1	John Rhea	Democratic-Republican	1803; 1815 (lost); 1817	Incumbent re-elected.	▌ ✓ John Rhea (Democratic-Republican) 40.4%; ▌John Tipton (Unknown) 35.6%; ▌John A. Rogers (Unknown) 24.1%
Tennessee 2	John Cocke	Democratic-Republican	1819	Incumbent re-elected.	▌ ✓ John Cocke (Democratic-Republican) 100%
Tennessee 3	Francis Jones	Democratic-Republican	1817	Incumbent re-elected.	▌ ✓ Francis Jones (Democratic-Republican) 99.6%; ▌Reuben Lidwell (Unknown) 0.4%
Tennessee 4	Robert Allen	Democratic-Republican	1819	Incumbent re-elected.	▌ ✓ Robert Allen (Democratic-Republican) 100%
Tennessee 5	Newton Cannon	Democratic-Republican	1814 (special); 1817 (lost); 1819	Incumbent re-elected.	▌ ✓ Newton Cannon (Democratic-Republican) 99.0%; ▌Fitzgerald Beasley (Unknown) 1.0%
Tennessee 6	Henry H. Bryan	Democratic-Republican	1819	Incumbent re-elected. Winner never appeared to take his seat.	▌ ✓ Henry H. Bryan (Democratic-Republican) 62.5%; ▌Eldridge B. Robertson (Unknown) 34.5%; ▌Colmore Duvall (Unknown) 3.0%

== Vermont ==
In 1820, Vermont returned to using districts. This would be the only election in which the 6th district would be used.

Vermont elected its members September 5, 1820. A majority was required for election, which was not met in the 2nd or 3rd district, requiring additional ballots to achieve a majority. The 2nd district required 7 ballots. The 3rd district required two additional ballots. The additional ballots were held December 11, 1820, and February 19, May 1, July 2, September 4, and October 22, 1821.

District	Incumbent			This race	
District	Member	Party	First elected	Results	Candidates
Vermont 1	Rollin Carolas Mallary; Redistricted from the at-large district	Democratic- Republican	1818	Incumbent re-elected.	▌ ✓ Rollin Carolas Mallary (Democratic-Republican) 51.9%; ▌Orsamus Cook Merrill (Democratic-Republican) 31.1%; ▌Chauncey Langdon (Federalist) 14.9%; Others 2.1%
Vermont 2	Mark Richards; Redistricted from the at-large district	Democratic- Republican	1816	Incumbent lost re-election. Democratic-Republican hold.	First ballot (September 5, 1820): ▌Phineas White (Democratic-Republican) 37.4%; ▌Mark Richards (Democratic-Republican) 34.5%; ▌James Elliot (Federalist) 15.8%; ▌William Hall Jr. (Federalist) 4.2%; ▌Samuel Elliot (Federalist) 2.7%; ▌Aaron Leland (Democratic-Republican) 2.5%; Others 3.0%; Second ballot (December 11, 1820): ▌Phineas White (Democratic-Republican) 41.3%; ▌Mark Richards (Democratic-Republican) 37.2%; ▌James Elliot (Federalist) 11.%; ▌Samuel Elliot (Federalist) 4.4%; ▌Jonathan Hunt (Federalist) 4.2%; Others 1.8%; Third ballot (February 19, 1821): ▌Phineas White (Democratic-Republican) 41.9%; ▌Mark Richards (Democratic-Republican) 37.6%; ▌James Elliot (Federalist) 12.1%; ▌Thomas G. Fessenden (Independent) 3.6%; ▌Aaron Leland (Democratic-Republican) 3.4%; Others 1.4%; Fourth ballot (May 1, 1821): ▌Mark Richards (Democratic-Republican) 43.6%; ▌Phineas White (Democratic-Republican) 39.4%; ▌James Elliot (Federalist) 7.9%; ▌Aaron Leland (Democratic-Republican) 4.0%; ▌Thomas G. Fessenden (Independent) 3.7%; Others 1.5%; Fifth ballot (July 2, 1821): ▌Mark Richards (Democratic-Republican) 48.6%; ▌Phineas White (Democratic-Republican) 46.9%; Others 4.5%; Sixth ballot (September 4, 1821): ▌Mark Richards (Democratic-Republican) 48.4%; ▌Phineas White (Democratic-Republican) 45.6%; Others 6.1%; Seventh ballot (October 22, 1821): ▌ ✓ Phineas White (Democratic-Republican) 49.9%; ▌Mark Richards (Democratic-Republican) 42.6%; ▌James Elliot (Federalist) 2.9%; ▌William Hall (Federalist) 1.6%; ▌Martin Field (Democratic-Republican) 1.2%; Others 1.8%
Vermont 3	Charles Rich; Redistricted from the at-large district	Democratic- Republican	1812; 1814 (lost); 1816	Incumbent re-elected on the third ballot.	First ballot (September 5, 1820): ▌Charles Rich (Democratic-Republican) 38.9%; ▌David Edmonds (Federalist) 27.9%; ▌Ezra Meech (Democratic-Republican) 17.0%; ▌Henry Olin (Democratic-Republican) 13.9%; Others 2.3%; Second ballot (December 11, 1820): ▌Charles Rich (Democratic-Republican) 49.7%; ▌David Edmonds (Federalist) 42.4%; ▌Ezra Meech (Democratic-Republican) 5.7%; ▌Henry Olin (Democratic-Republican) 2.2%; Third ballot (February 19, 1821): ▌ ✓ Charles Rich (Democratic-Republican) 50.6%; ▌David Edmonds (Federalist) 41.2%; ▌Ezra Meech (Democratic-Republican) 8.2%
Vermont 3	Ezra Meech; Redistricted from the at-large district	Democratic- Republican	1818	Incumbent lost re-election. Democratic-Republican loss.	
Vermont 4	William Strong; Redistricted from the at-large district	Democratic- Republican	1810; 1814 (lost); 1818	Incumbent lost re-election. Democratic-Republican hold.	▌ ✓ Elias Keyes (Democratic-Republican) 50.6%; ▌Horace Everett (Democratic-Republican) 24.8%; ▌Uriel C. Hatch (Democratic-Republican) 15.8%; ▌William Strong (Democratic-Republican) 5.8%; Others 3.0%
Vermont 5	Samuel C. Crafts; Redistricted from the at-large district	Democratic- Republican	1816	Incumbent re-elected.	▌ ✓ Samuel C. Crafts (Democratic-Republican) 58.6%; ▌Heman Allen (Democratic-Republican) 40.1%; Others 1.3%
Vermont 6	None (new district)			New seat. Democratic-Republican gain.	▌ ✓ John Mattocks (Democratic-Republican) 54.3%; ▌D. Azro A. Buck (Democratic-Republican) 41.7%; ▌William Cahoon (Democratic-Republican) 1.9%; Others 2.1%

== Virginia ==
Virginia elected its members in April 1821, after the term began but before the new Congress convened.

District	Incumbent			This race	
District	Member	Party	First elected	Results	Candidates
Virginia 1	Edward B. Jackson	Democratic-Republican	1820 (special)	Incumbent re-elected.	▌ ✓ Edward B. Jackson (Democratic-Republican); ▌Thomas Wilson (Federalist)
Virginia 2	Thomas Van Swearingen	Federalist	1819	Incumbent re-elected.	▌ ✓ Thomas Van Swearingen (Federalist) 83.2%; ▌Robert Bailey (Democratic-Republican) 16.8%
Virginia 3	Jared Williams	Democratic-Republican	1819	Incumbent re-elected.	▌ ✓ Jared Williams (Democratic-Republican) 63.3%; ▌William Steinbergen (Democratic-Republican) 36.7%
Virginia 4	William McCoy	Democratic-Republican	1811	Incumbent re-elected.	▌ ✓ William McCoy (Democratic-Republican) 100%
Virginia 5	John Floyd	Democratic-Republican	1817	Incumbent re-elected.	▌ ✓ John Floyd (Democratic-Republican) 100%
Virginia 6	Alexander Smyth	Democratic-Republican	1817	Incumbent re-elected.	▌ ✓ Alexander Smyth (Democratic-Republican) 100%
Virginia 7	Ballard Smith	Democratic-Republican	1815	Incumbent retired. Democratic-Republican hold.	▌ ✓ William Smith (Democratic-Republican) 53.2%; ▌James Wilson (Democratic-Republican) 46.8%
Virginia 8	Charles F. Mercer	Federalist	1817	Incumbent re-elected.	▌ ✓ Charles F. Mercer (Federalist) 55.0%; ▌Sydnor Bailey (Democratic-Republican) 44.8%
Virginia 9	William Lee Ball	Democratic-Republican	1817	Incumbent re-elected.	▌ ✓ William Lee Ball (Democratic-Republican); ▌John P. Hungerford (Democratic-Republican)
Virginia 10	Thomas L. Moore	Democratic-Republican	1820 (special)	Incumbent re-elected.	▌ ✓ Thomas L. Moore (Democratic-Republican); ▌Mark A. Chilton (Democratic-Republican)
Virginia 11	Philip P. Barbour	Democratic-Republican	1814 (special)	Incumbent re-elected.	▌ ✓ Philip P. Barbour (Democratic-Republican) 100%
Virginia 12	Robert S. Garnett	Democratic-Republican	1817	Incumbent re-elected.	▌ ✓ Robert S. Garnett (Democratic-Republican) 100%
Virginia 13	Severn E. Parker	Democratic-Republican	1819	Incumbent retired. Democratic-Republican hold.	▌ ✓ Burwell Bassett (Democratic-Republican) 66.6%; ▌John Patterson (Federalist) 30.0%; ▌Brazure W. Pryor (Federalist) 3.4%
Virginia 14	William A. Burwell	Democratic-Republican	1806 (special)	Incumbent retired. Democratic-Republican hold.	▌ ✓ Jabez Leftwich (Democratic-Republican); ▌James Calloway (Democratic-Republican)
Virginia 15	George Tucker	Democratic-Republican	1819	Incumbent re-elected.	▌ ✓ George Tucker (Democratic-Republican) 87.5%; ▌William R. Roane (Federalist) 12.5%
Virginia 16	John Randolph	Democratic-Republican	1799; 1813 (lost); 1815; 1817 (lost); 1819	Incumbent re-elected.	▌ ✓ John Randolph (Democratic-Republican); ▌Archibald Austin (Democratic-Republican)
Virginia 17	William S. Archer	Democratic-Republican	1820 (special)	Incumbent re-elected.	▌ ✓ William S. Archer (Democratic-Republican) 100%
Virginia 18	Mark Alexander	Democratic-Republican	1819	Incumbent re-elected.	▌ ✓ Mark Alexander (Democratic-Republican) 100%
Virginia 19	James Jones	Democratic-Republican	1819	Incumbent re-elected.	▌ ✓ James Jones (Democratic-Republican) 100%
Virginia 20	John C. Gray	Democratic-Republican	1820 (special)	Incumbent lost re-election. Democratic-Republican hold.	▌ ✓ Arthur Smith (Democratic-Republican) 60.3%; ▌John C. Gray (Democratic-Republican) 39.7%
Virginia 21	Thomas Newton Jr.	Democratic-Republican	1797	Incumbent re-elected.	▌ ✓ Thomas Newton Jr. (Democratic-Republican) 94.7%; Others 5.3%
Virginia 22	Hugh Nelson	Democratic-Republican	1811	Incumbent re-elected.	▌ ✓ Hugh Nelson (Democratic-Republican) 100%
Virginia 23	John Tyler	Democratic-Republican	1816 (special)	Incumbent retired. Democratic-Republican hold.	▌ ✓ Andrew Stevenson (Democratic-Republican) 100%

== Non-voting delegates ==
There were four territories that had the right to send a delegate to at least part of the 17th Congress, only three of which actually sent delegates. Missouri Territory's seat remained vacant, as the territory was admitted as the State of Missouri early in the 17th Congress.

District	Incumbent			This race	
District	Delegate	Party	First elected	Results	Candidates
Arkansas Territory at-large	James Woodson Bates	None	1819	Incumbent re-elected.	▌ ✓ James Woodson Bates 51.5%; ▌Matthew Lyon (Democratic-Republican) 48.5%
Michigan Territory at-large	Solomon Sibley	None	1820 (special)	Incumbent re-elected sometime in 1821.	▌ ✓ Solomon Sibley (Democratic-Republican) 47.0%; ▌Augustus B. Woodward 28.2%; ▌James MacCloskey 24.5%; Others 0.3%

== See also ==
- 1820 United States elections
  - List of United States House of Representatives elections (1789–1822)
  - 1820 United States presidential election
  - 1820–21 United States Senate elections
- 16th United States Congress
- 17th United States Congress

== Bibliography ==
- "A New Nation Votes: American Election Returns 1787-1825". Tufts Digital Library, Tufts University. Archived from the original on January 29, 2015.
- Dubin, Michael J. (March 1, 1998). United States Congressional Elections, 1788-1997: The Official Results of the Elections of the 1st Through 105th Congresses. McFarland and Company. ISBN 978-0786402830.
- Martis, Kenneth C. (January 1, 1989). The Historical Atlas of Political Parties in the United States Congress, 1789-1989. Macmillan Publishing Company. ISBN 978-0029201701.
- "Party Divisions of the House of Representatives* 1789–Present". Office of the Historian, United States House of Representatives.
- Cox, Harold (January 14, 2007). "17th Congress 1821-1823" (PDF). Pennsylvania Election Statistics: 1682-2006 The Wilkes University Election Statistics Project. Wilkes University.
- Mapping Early American Elections project team (2019). "Mapping Early American Elections". Roy Rosenzweig Center for History and New Media, George Mason University.
