= List of elections in 1820 =

The following elections occurred in the year 1820.

== Europe ==
- 1820 French legislative election
- 1820 Norwegian parliamentary election
- 1820 Portuguese legislative election
- Spanish general election, 1820
- 1820 United Kingdom general election

== North America ==
=== United States ===
- 1820 United States elections
- 1820 United States presidential election

==== United States lieutenant gubernatorial ====
- 1820 Connecticut lieutenant gubernatorial election
- 1820 Missouri lieutenant gubernatorial election

==== United States gubernatorial ====
- 1820 Connecticut gubernatorial election
- 1820 Delaware gubernatorial special election
- 1820 Kentucky gubernatorial election
- 1820 Louisiana gubernatorial election
- 1820 Maine gubernatorial election
- 1820 Maryland gubernatorial election
- 1820 Massachusetts gubernatorial election
- 1820 Missouri gubernatorial election
- 1820 New Hampshire gubernatorial election
- 1820 New Jersey gubernatorial election
- 1820 New York gubernatorial election
- 1820 North Carolina gubernatorial election
- 1820 Ohio gubernatorial election
- 1820 Pennsylvania gubernatorial election
- 1820 Rhode Island gubernatorial election
- 1820 South Carolina gubernatorial election
- 1820 Vermont gubernatorial election
- 1820 Virginia gubernatorial election

==== United States Senate ====
- 1820 and 1821 United States Senate elections
- United States Senate election in New York, 1819/1820
- 1820–21 United States Senate election in Pennsylvania

==== United States House of Representatives ====
- 1820–21 United States House of Representatives elections
- 1820 United States House of Representatives election in Delaware
- 1820 United States House of Representatives election in Georgia
- 1820 United States House of Representatives election in Illinois
- 1820 United States House of Representatives election in Indiana
- 1820 United States House of Representatives elections in Kentucky
- 1820 Kentucky's 6th congressional district special election
- 1820 Kentucky's 9th congressional district special election
- 1820 United States House of Representatives election in Louisiana
- 1820–1821 United States House of Representatives elections in Maine
- 1820 Maine's at-large congressional district special election
- 1820 United States House of Representatives elections in Maryland
- 1820–1821 United States House of Representatives elections in Massachusetts
- 1820 Massachusetts's 1st congressional district special election
- 1820 Massachusetts's 8th congressional district special election
- 1820 Massachusetts's 13th congressional district special election
- 1820 Michigan Territory's at-large congressional district special election
- 1820 United States House of Representatives election in Michigan Territory
- 1820 United States House of Representatives election in Mississippi
- 1820 United States House of Representatives election in Missouri
- 1820 United States House of Representatives election in New Hampshire
- 1820 New Jersey's at-large congressional district special election
- 1820 United States House of Representatives election in New Jersey
- 1820 United States House of Representatives elections in Ohio
- 1820 United States House of Representatives elections in Pennsylvania
- 1820 Pennsylvania's 5th congressional district special election
- 1820 Pennsylvania's 7th congressional district special election
- 1820 United States House of Representatives election in Rhode Island
- 1820 United States House of Representatives elections in South Carolina
- 1820–1821 United States House of Representatives elections in Vermont
- 1820 Virginia's 1st congressional district special election
- 1820 Virginia's 10th congressional district special election
- 1820 Virginia's 17th congressional district special election
- 1820 Virginia's 20th congressional district special election

== See also ==
- Category:1820 elections
