= List of elections in 1821 =

The following elections occurred in the year 1821.

== North America ==
=== United States ===
==== United States lieutenant gubernatorial ====
- 1821 Connecticut lieutenant gubernatorial election

==== United States gubernatorial ====
- 1821 Alabama gubernatorial election
- 1821 Connecticut gubernatorial election
- 1821 Georgia gubernatorial election
- 1821 Maine gubernatorial election
- 1821 Maryland gubernatorial election
- 1821 Massachusetts gubernatorial election
- 1821 Mississippi gubernatorial election
- 1821 New Hampshire gubernatorial election
- 1821 New Jersey gubernatorial election
- 1821 North Carolina gubernatorial election
- 1821 Rhode Island gubernatorial election
- 1821 Tennessee gubernatorial election
- 1821 Vermont gubernatorial election
- 1821 Virginia gubernatorial election

==== United States Senate ====
- 1820–21 United States Senate elections
- United States Senate election in New York, 1821

==== United States House of Representatives ====
- 1820 and 1821 United States House of Representatives elections
- 1821 United States House of Representatives election in Alabama
- 1821 United States House of Representatives election in Arkansas Territory
- 1821 United States House of Representatives election in Connecticut
- 1821 Kentucky's 7th congressional district special election
- 1821 Kentucky's 8th congressional district special election
- 1820–1821 United States House of Representatives elections in Maine
- 1820–1821 United States House of Representatives elections in Massachusetts
- 1821 United States House of Representatives election in Michigan Territory
- 1821 New Jersey's at-large congressional district special election
- 1821 United States House of Representatives elections in New York
- 1821 New York's 6th congressional district special election
- 1821 United States House of Representatives elections in North Carolina
- 1821 North Carolina's 4th congressional district special election
- 1821 Ohio's 4th congressional district special election
- 1821 Pennsylvania's 5th congressional district special election
- 1821 Pennsylvania's 10th congressional district special election
- 1821 South Carolina's 9th congressional district special election
- 1821 United States House of Representatives elections in Tennessee
- 1820–1821 United States House of Representatives elections in Vermont
- 1821 United States House of Representatives elections in Virginia

== See also ==
- Category:1821 elections
