= Senator Dane =

Senator Dane may refer to:

- Joseph Dane (1778–1858), Maine State Senate
- Nathan Dane (1752–1835), Massachusetts State Senate
