= 1820 New Jersey's at-large congressional district special election =

John Condit (Democratic-Republican) of New Jersey's at-large congressional district resigned to become assistant collector of the Port of New York.

Charles Kinsey (also Democratic-Republican) was elected February 2, 1820 to replace him. Kinsey had previously served as a member from New Jersey but had lost re-election to Condit in 1818.

He was seated February 16, 1820.

== Candidates ==
- George Cassedy, former postmaster of Hackensack
- Lewis Condict, former U.S. representative and speaker of the New Jersey General Assembly
- Ebenezer Elmer, collector of customs of Bridgeton, former U.S. representative, and former vice president of the New Jersey Legislative Council
- Thomas T. Kinney
- Charles Kinsey, former member of the New Jersey Legislative Council and New Jersey General Assembly
- James Parker
- Gerard Rutgers
- James D. Westcott Sr.

== Results ==
√ Charles Kinsey (Democratic-Republican) 62.2%
James Parker 10.1%
George Cassedy 5.1%
Lewis Condict 3.4%
Ebenezer Elmer 3.3%
Gerard Rutgers 3.2%
John Rutherford 2.9%
Charles Kinsey 2.2%
James D. Westcott 1.4%
Thomas T. Kinney 1.1%
scattering 5.1%

== See also ==
- 1818 and 1819 United States House of Representatives elections
- List of United States representatives from New Jersey
