= 1821 North Carolina's 4th congressional district special election =

On December 20, 1820, Jesse Slocumb (DR) of North Carolina's 4th district died. A special election was held to fill the resulting vacancy.

== Election results ==
Candidate	Party	Votes	Percent
William S. Blackledge	Democratic-Republican	880	57.7%
Barnabus MacKinnie	(Note: Source does not indicate party affiliation.)	644	42.3%

Blackledge took office on February 7, 1821, near the end of the 16th Congress. He was also elected to the 17th Congress.

== See also ==
- List of special elections to the United States House of Representatives
- 1820 and 1821 United States House of Representatives elections
- List of United States representatives from North Carolina
