= 1821 Pennsylvania's 5th congressional district special election =

In April, 1821, prior to the first meeting of the 17th Congress, Representative-elect James Duncan (DR) from Pennsylvania's 5th district resigned. A special election was held to fill the resulting vacancy on October 9, 1821.

== Election results ==
Candidate	Party	Votes	Percent
John Findlay	Democratic-Republican	4,981	53.6%
Thomas G. McCullough	Federalist	4,310	46.4%

Findlay took his seat December 12, 1821

== See also ==
- List of special elections to the United States House of Representatives
