= 1820 Maine's at-large congressional district special election =

A special election was held in Maine's at-large congressional district on November 7, 1820, to fill a vacancy left by the resignation of John Holmes. Holmes had been elected under the authority of the State of Massachusetts to that state's former 14th district, part of the District of Maine. When, on March 15, 1820, the former District was granted statehood as the State of Maine, Holmes was elected one of its first two Senators. Under the act admitting Maine as a state, seven seats were moved from Massachusetts to Maine for the 17th Congress, and any vacancies in the 16th Congress that arose in seats held by residents of Maine were to be filled by residents of the new state.

The special election was held on the same date as the general elections for the 17th Congress.

== Election results ==
Candidate	Party	Votes	Percent
Joseph Dane	Federalist	929	53.6%
Alexander Rice	Democratic-Republican	662	38.2%
Isaac Lyman	Unknown	78	4.5%
William Moody	Unknown	46	2.3%
Others		17	1.0%

Dane took his seat on December 11, 1820

== See also ==
- List of special elections to the United States House of Representatives
- 1820 and 1821 United States House of Representatives elections
- List of United States representatives from Maine
