= 1821 Pennsylvania's 10th congressional district special election =

On July 20, 1821, William Cox Ellis (F) from Pennsylvania's 10th district resigned. A special election was held to fill the resulting vacancy on October 9, 1821.

== Election results ==
Candidate	Party	Votes	Percent
Thomas Murray, Jr.	Democratic-Republican	6,038	50.3%
William Cox Ellis	Federalist	5,961	49.7%

Murray took his seat on December 12, 1821.

== See also ==
- List of special elections to the United States House of Representatives
