= 1820 Virginia gubernatorial election =

- December 16, 1820
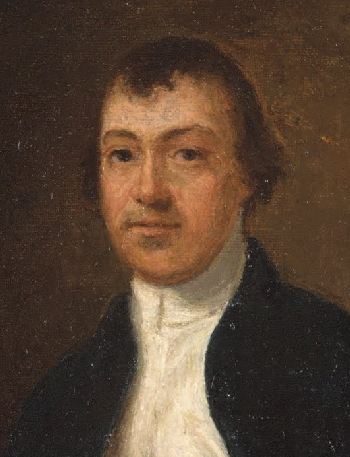

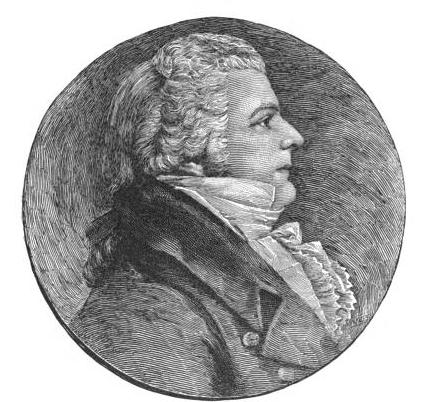
Nominee	Thomas Mann Randolph Jr.	Hugh Nelson
1st ballot	134	38
Governor before election
Thomas Mann Randolph Jr.
Democratic-Republican
Elected Governor
Thomas Mann Randolph Jr.
Democratic-Republican (Note: Lampi lists no parties for this election. Kallenbach and Kallenbach list Randolph as a Jeffersonian Republican, while Sobel and Raimo do not indicate a party.)

A gubernatorial election was held in Virginia on December 16, 1820. The incumbent governor of Virginia Thomas Mann Randolph Jr. defeated the U.S. representative from Virginia's 22nd congressional district Hugh Nelson.

The election was conducted by the Virginia General Assembly in joint session. Voting was scheduled to have begun on December 9, but was postponed until the following Saturday by agreement of the Senate and the House of Delegates. Randolph was elected with a majority on the first ballot.

== General election ==
1820 Virginia gubernatorial special election
Candidate	First ballot	
Candidate	Count	Percent
Thomas Mann Randolph Jr. (incumbent)	164	79.23
Hugh Nelson	38	18.36
Others (Note: The Virginia Patriot and Richmond Daily Mercantile Advertiser shows 6 votes for others.)	5	2.41
Total	207	100.00

== Bibliography ==
- Kallenbach, Joseph E.; Kallenbach, Jessamine S. (1977). American State Governors, 1776–1976. Vol. 1. Dobbs Ferry, NY: Oceana Publications.
- Lampi, Philip J. (2012). "Virginia 1820 Governor". A New Nation Votes. American Antiquarian Society.
- Sobel, Robert; Raimo, John (1978). Biographical Directory of the Governors of the United States 1789–1978. Vol. 4. Westport, CT: Meckler Books.
- Virginia (1820). Journal of the House of Delegates [...]. Richmond.
