= 1820 Connecticut lieutenant gubernatorial election =

- April 3, 1820
Nominee	Jonathan Ingersoll
Party	Toleration
Popular vote	13,294
Percentage	89.00%
Lieutenant Governor before election
Jonathan Ingersoll
Toleration
Elected Lieutenant Governor
Jonathan Ingersoll
Toleration

The 1820 Connecticut lieutenant gubernatorial election was held on April 3, 1820, in order to elect the lieutenant governor of Connecticut. Incumbent Toleration lieutenant governor Jonathan Ingersoll won re-election as he ran with minimal opposition.

== General election ==
On election day, April 3, 1820, incumbent Toleration lieutenant governor Jonathan Ingersoll won re-election with 89.00% of the vote, thereby retaining Toleration control over the office of lieutenant governor. Ingersoll was sworn in for his fifth term on May 3, 1820.

=== Results ===
Connecticut lieutenant gubernatorial election, 1820
Party	Candidate	Votes	%
Toleration	Jonathan Ingersoll (incumbent)	13,294	89.00
	Scattering	1,356	11.00
Total votes		14,650	100.00
Toleration hold			
