= 1820 Missouri lieutenant gubernatorial election =

- August 28, 1820
Nominee	William H. Ashley
Party	Democratic-Republican
Popular vote	Unknown
Percentage	100.00%
Lieutenant Governor before election
Office established
Elected Lieutenant Governor
William H. Ashley
Democratic-Republican

The 1820 Missouri lieutenant gubernatorial election was held on August 28, 1820, in order to elect the first lieutenant governor of Missouri upon Missouri acquiring statehood on August 10, 1821. Democratic-Republican nominee William H. Ashley won the election as he ran unopposed. The exact results of the election are unknown.

== General election ==
On election day, August 28, 1820, Democratic-Republican nominee William H. Ashley won the election as he ran unopposed, thereby gaining Democratic-Republican control over the office of lieutenant governor. Ashley was sworn in as the 1st lieutenant governor of Missouri on September 18, 1820.

=== Results ===
Missouri lieutenant gubernatorial election, 1820
Party	Candidate	Votes	%
Democratic-Republican	William H. Ashley	Unknown	100.00
Total votes		Unknown	100.00
Democratic-Republican gain from			

== See also ==
- 1820 Missouri gubernatorial election
