= 1821 New Jersey's at-large congressional district special election =

A special election was held in New Jersey's at-large congressional district on October 8, 1821, to fill a vacancy caused by the death of John Linn (DR) on January 5, 1821, prior to the start of the 17th Congress.

== Election results ==
| Candidate | Party | Votes | Percent |
|---|---|---|---|
| Lewis Condict | Democratic-Republican | 9,900 | 46.5% |
| Robert W. Rutherford | Democratic-Republican | 6,662 | 31.3% |
| James Parker | Federalist | 4,737 | 22.2% |

Condict took his seat with the rest of New Jersey's delegation at the start of the 1st session of the 17th Congress.

== See also ==
- List of special elections to the United States House of Representatives
