= James S. Mitchell =

American politician

James S. Mitchell (1784–1844) was an American politician who served three terms as member of the U.S. House of Representatives from Pennsylvania from 1821 to 1827.

== Biography ==
Mitchell was born near Rossville, Pennsylvania, in 1784. He was a member of the Pennsylvania House of Representatives from 1812 to 1814.

=== Congress ===
Mitchell was elected as a Republican to the Seventeenth Congress, reelected as a Jackson Republican to the Eighteenth Congress, and elected as a Jacksonian to the Nineteenth Congress.

== Death and burial ==
He moved to Jefferson County, Ohio, in 1827, and later to Belleville, Illinois, where he died in 1844. Interment at Dillsburg, Pennsylvania.

== Sources ==
- United States Congress. "James S. Mitchell (id: M000816)". Biographical Directory of the United States Congress.
- The Political Graveyard

U.S. House of Representatives
Preceded by Jacob Hostetter	Member of the U.S. House of Representatives from Pennsylvania's 4th congressional district 1821–1823	Succeeded by James Buchanan; Samuel Edwards; Isaac Wayne
Preceded by George Denison; Thomas Murray Jr.	Member of the U.S. House of Representatives from Pennsylvania's 10th congressional district 1823–1827	Succeeded by Adam King
