= 1821 Virginia gubernatorial election =

- December 8, 1821
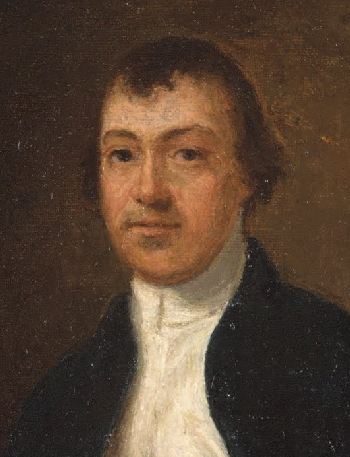

Nominee	Thomas Mann Randolph Jr.	Burwell Bassett
1st ballot	146	39
Governor before election
Thomas Mann Randolph Jr.
Democratic-Republican
Elected Governor
Thomas Mann Randolph Jr.
Democratic-Republican (Note: Lampi lists no parties for this election. Kallenbach and Kallenbach list Randolph as a Jeffersonian Republican, while Sobel and Raimo do not indicate a party.)

A gubernatorial election was held in Virginia on December 8, 1821. The incumbent governor of Virginia Thomas Mann Randolph Jr. defeated the U.S. representative from Virginia's 13th congressional district Burwell Bassett.

The election was conducted by the Virginia General Assembly in joint session. Randolph was elected with a majority on the first ballot.

== General election ==
1820 Virginia gubernatorial special election
Candidate	First ballot	
Candidate	Count	Percent
Thomas Mann Randolph Jr. (incumbent)	146	77.25
Burwell Bassett	39	20.64
Others	4	2.12
Total	189	100.00

== Bibliography ==
- Kallenbach, Joseph E.; Kallenbach, Jessamine S. (1977). American State Governors, 1776–1976. Vol. 1. Dobbs Ferry, NY: Oceana Publications.
- Lampi, Philip J. (2012). "Virginia 1821 Governor". A New Nation Votes. American Antiquarian Society.
- Sobel, Robert; Raimo, John (1978). Biographical Directory of the Governors of the United States 1789–1978. Vol. 4. Westport, CT: Meckler Books.
