= John Condit =

American politician and senator from New Jersey (1755–1834)

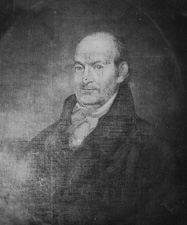

United States Senator from New Jersey
- In office September 1, 1803 – March 3, 1809
- Preceded by: Aaron Ogden
- Succeeded by: John Lambert
- In office March 21, 1809 – March 3, 1817
- Preceded by: Aaron Kitchell
- Succeeded by: Mahlon Dickerson

Member of the U.S. House of Representatives from New Jersey's at-large district
- In office March 4, 1819 – November 4, 1819
- Preceded by: Charles Kinsey
- Succeeded by: Charles Kinsey

Member of the New Jersey General Assembly
- In office 1788–1789

Personal details
- Born: July 8, 1755 Orange, Province of New Jersey, British America
- Died: May 4, 1834 (aged 78) Orange, New Jersey, U.S.
- Party: Democratic-Republican

John Condit a.k.a. Condict (July 8, 1755 – May 4, 1834) was a United States representative and a United States senator from New Jersey and father of United States Representative Silas Condit.

John Condict was born in Orange in the Province of New Jersey and after attending public schools he then studied medicine. Condict went on to serve as a surgeon in the American Revolutionary War. He became one of the founders and a trustee of the Orange Academy in 1785.

== Political history ==
Condict was a member of the New Jersey General Assembly from 1788 to 1789, and the New Jersey Legislative Council from 1790 to 1797.

=== U.S. House of Representatives ===
He was elected as a Democratic-Republican to the Sixth and Seventh Congresses (March 4, 1799, to March 4, 1803).

=== U.S. Senate ===
Condict was appointed as a Democratic Republican to the United States Senate to fill the vacancy in the term beginning March 4, 1803, caused by the failure of the legislature to elect. Elected November 3, 1803, to finish the term. Served from September 1, 1803, to March 3, 1809. He was again appointed to the Senate to fill the vacancy caused by the resignation of Aaron Kitchell. Elected November 2, 1809, to finish the term and served from March 21, 1809, to March 3, 1817.

=== Later positions ===
He was elected to the Sixteenth Congress and served from March 4, 1819, to November 4, 1819, when he resigned to accept a Treasury position; appointed assistant collector of the port of New York 1819–1830.

== Death and legacy ==
Condict died in Orange Township, New Jersey on May 4, 1834, and was interred in the Old Graveyard, Orange, Essex County, New Jersey. He was surgeon in Col. Van Cortland's Battalion (Heard's Brigade, June 29, 1776).

U.S. House of Representatives
Preceded by New district	Member of the U.S. House of Representatives from New Jersey's 1st congressional district March 4, 1799 – March 3, 1801	Succeeded by District eliminated
Preceded by New district	Member of the U.S. House of Representatives from New Jersey's at-large congressional district March 4, 1801 – March 3, 1803; Served alongside: Ebenezer Elmer, William Helms, James Mott, Henry Southard	Succeeded by Adam Boyd, Ebenezer Elmer, William Helms, James Mott, Henry Southard, James Sloan
U.S. Senate
Preceded by Aaron Ogden	U.S. senator (Class 1) from New Jersey; September 1, 1803 – March 3, 1809; Served alongside: Jonathan Dayton, Aaron Kitchell	Succeeded by John Lambert
Preceded by Aaron Kitchell	U.S. senator (Class 2) from New Jersey; March 21, 1809 – March 3, 1817; Served alongside: John Lambert, James J. Wilson	Succeeded by Mahlon Dickerson
U.S. House of Representatives
Preceded by Charles Kinsey	Member of the U.S. House of Representatives from New Jersey's at-large congressional district March 4, 1819 – November 4, 1819	Succeeded by Charles Kinsey
