= William Helms =

American politician

William Helms (died 1813) was a United States representative from New Jersey. Born in Sussex County, he served during the Revolutionary War as second lieutenant, first lieutenant, and captain, and was brevetted major on September 30, 1783. Following the War, he was admitted as an original member of The Society of the Cincinnati in the state of New Jersey.

Helms was a member of the New Jersey General Assembly in 1791 and 1792 and was elected as a Democratic-Republican to the Seventh and to the four succeeding Congresses, serving from March 4, 1801 to March 3, 1811. He moved to Hamilton County, Ohio and died in 1813.

U.S. House of Representatives
Preceded by Jonathan Dayton	Member of the U.S. House of Representatives from New Jersey's at-large congressional district March 4, 1801 – March 3, 1811	Succeeded by Lewis Condict
