= 1817 Massachusetts's 1st congressional district special election =

A special election was held August 26, 1817 in Massachusetts's 1st congressional district to fill a vacancy left by the resignation of Representative-elect James Lloyd (F) before the beginning of the 15th Congress.

Mason was seated December 2, 1817.

== Election results ==
Candidate	Party	Votes	Percent
Jonathan Mason	Federalist	1,746	55.6%
Andrew Ritchie	Federalist	1,393	44.4%

== See also ==
- List of special elections to the United States House of Representatives
