= 1821 Connecticut lieutenant gubernatorial election =

- April 3, 1821
Nominee	Jonathan Ingersoll
Party	Toleration
Popular vote	7,354
Percentage	92.80%
- Ingersoll: 40–50% 50–60% 60–70% 70–80% 80–90% 90–100% Pilkin: 50–60% 70–80% No Data/Vote
Lieutenant Governor before election
Jonathan Ingersoll
Toleration
Elected Lieutenant Governor
Jonathan Ingersoll
Toleration

The 1821 Connecticut lieutenant gubernatorial election was held on April 3, 1821, in order to elect the lieutenant governor of Connecticut. Incumbent Toleration lieutenant governor Jonathan Ingersoll won re-election as he ran with minimal opposition.

== General election ==
On election day, April 3, 1821, incumbent Toleration lieutenant governor Jonathan Ingersoll won re-election with 92.80% of the vote, thereby retaining Toleration control over the office of lieutenant governor. Ingersoll was sworn in for his sixth term on May 2, 1821.

=== Results ===
Connecticut lieutenant gubernatorial election, 1821
Party	Candidate	Votes	%
Toleration	Jonathan Ingersoll (incumbent)	7,354	92.80
	Scattering	619	7.20
Total votes		7,973	100.00
Toleration hold			
