= 1820 Michigan Territory's at-large congressional district special election =

On August 9, 1820, William Woodbridge, the first delegate for Michigan Territory, resigned, after having served since March 2, 1820. A special election was held to fill the resulting vacancy.

== Election results ==
Candidate	Votes	Percent
Solomon Sibley	213	41.4%
Augustus B. Woodward	206	40.0%
James MacCloskey	89	17.3%
Jonathan R. Williams	7	1.4%

Sibley took his seat on November 20, 1820.

== See also ==
- List of special elections to the United States House of Representatives
- 1820 and 1821 United States House of Representatives elections
