= 1820 Pennsylvania's 5th congressional district special election =

On May 15, 1820, David Fullerton (DR) of Pennsylvania's 5th district resigned from his seat in the House of Representatives. A special election was held on October 10, 1820, to fill the resulting vacancy. This election was held on the same day as the election for the 17th Congress.

== Election results ==
Candidate	Party	Votes	Percent
Thomas G. McCullough	Federalist	6,511	51.4%
Matthew S. Clarke	Democratic-Republican	5,487	43.3%
Robert K. Lowry	Independent	679	5.4%

McCullough took his seat November 13, 1820

== See also ==
- List of special elections to the United States House of Representatives
