= 1820 Virginia's 10th congressional district special election =

On February 10, 1820, George F. Strother (DR), Representative for Virginia's 10th district, resigned, having been appointed as receiver of public money in St. Louis, Missouri. A special election was held to fill the resulting vacancy

== Election results ==
Candidate	Party	Votes	Percent
Thomas L. Moore	Democratic-Republican	563	41.0%
Zephaniah Turner	(Note: Source does not give party affiliation)	377	27.5%
John Love	Democratic-Republican	370	27.0%
Mark A. Chilton		62	4.5%

Moore took his seat on November 13, 1820.

== See also ==
- List of special elections to the United States House of Representatives
