= William Cox Ellis =

American politician (1787–1871)

William C. Ellis

Member of the U.S. House of Representatives from Pennsylvania's 9th district
- In office March 4, 1823 – March 3, 1825
- Preceded by: John Brown
- Succeeded by: See below

Member of the Pennsylvania House of Representatives
- In office 1825-1826

Personal details
- Born: May 5, 1787 Fort Muncy, Pennsylvania, US
- Died: December 13, 1871 (aged 84) Muncy, Pennsylvania, US
- Party: Republican

William Cox Ellis (May 5, 1787 – December 13, 1871) was a member of the United States House of Representatives from Pennsylvania.

== Biography ==
William Cox Ellis was born in Fort Muncy, Pennsylvania, son of William and Mercy Cox Ellis. He attended the public schools, and graduated from the Friends’ School near Pennsdale, Pennsylvania, in 1803. He was deputy surveyor general from 1803 to 1810 and cashier of the Union and Northumberland County Bank from 1810 to 1818. He studied law, was admitted to the bar in 1817 and commenced practice in Muncy, Pennsylvania. He married Rebecca Morris in 1810.

=== Political career ===
Ellis was elected as a Republican in 1820 to the Seventeenth Congress, but resigned before the Congress assembled. He was an unsuccessful candidate for reelection to fill the vacancy caused by his own resignation. Ellis was elected as a Jackson Federalist candidate to the Eighteenth Congress. He was a member of the Pennsylvania House of Representatives in 1825 and 1826. He became affiliated with the Republican Party in 1856. He resumed the practice of law in Muncy and died there in 1871.

U.S. House of Representatives
Preceded by John Murray; George Denison	Member of the U.S. House of Representatives from Pennsylvania's 10th congressional district 1821 alongside: George Denison	Succeeded by George Denison; Thomas Murray, Jr.
Preceded by John Brown	Member of the U.S. House of Representatives from Pennsylvania's 9th congressional district 1823–1825 alongside: George Kremer and Samuel McKean	Succeeded by Samuel McKean; George Kremer; Espy Van Horne
