= John Murray (Pennsylvania politician) =

American politician

Member of the U.S. House of Representatives from Pennsylvania's 10th district
- In office October 14, 1817 – March 4, 1821
- Preceded by: David Scott
- Succeeded by: William C. Ellis

Personal details
- Born: 1768 Near Pott's Grove, Pennsylvania, British America
- Died: March 7, 1834 (aged 65–66) East Chillisquaque Township, Pennsylvania, USA
- Party: Republican
- Relatives: Thomas Murray, Jr. (cousin)

John Murray (1768 – March 7, 1834) was a member of the United States House of Representatives from Pennsylvania.

== Biography ==
John Murray was born near Pott's Grove, Pennsylvania. He was a member of the Pennsylvania House of Representatives from 1807 to 1810. Murray was elected as a Republican to the Fifteenth Congress to fill the vacancy caused by the resignation of David Scott. He was reelected to the Sixteenth Congress.

He died in East Chillisquaque Township, Pennsylvania and was interred in Chillisquaque Cemetery, near Potts Grove.

He was a cousin of Thomas Murray, Jr. (1779-1823), who also served as a Congressman from Pennsylvania.

== Sources ==
- United States Congress. "John Murray (id: M001109)". Biographical Directory of the United States Congress.
- The Political Graveyard

U.S. House of Representatives
Preceded by David Scott; William Wilson	Member of the U.S. House of Representatives from Pennsylvania's 10th congressional district 1817–1821 1817–1819 alongside:William Wilson; 1819–1821 alongside:George Denison	Succeeded by George Denison; William Cox Ellis
