= George Denison (American politician) =

American politician

Member of the U.S. House of Representatives from Pennsylvania's 10th district
- In office March 4, 1819 – March 3, 1823
- Preceded by: See below
- Succeeded by: See below

Member of the Pennsylvania House of Representatives
- In office 1815–1816

Personal details
- Born: February 22, 1790 Kingston, Pennsylvania
- Died: August 20, 1831 (aged 41) Wilkes-Barre, Pennsylvania
- Party: Democratic-Republican

George Denison (February 22, 1790 – August 20, 1831) was a member of the United States House of Representatives from Pennsylvania.

== Biography ==
Denison (uncle of Charles Denison) was born in Kingston, Pennsylvania. He attended the Wilkes-Barre Academy. He served as clerk of the Wilkes-Barre borough council from 1811 to 1814, and member of the council for many years, serving as president in 1823 and 1824. He served as recorder and registrar of Luzerne County, Pennsylvania, from 1812 to 1815. He studied law, was admitted to the bar in 1813 and commenced practice in Luzerne County.

He was a member of the Pennsylvania House of Representatives in 1815 and 1816. He was elected as a Republican to the Sixteenth and Seventeenth Congresses. He served as chairman of the United States House Committee on Expenditures in the Post Office Department in the Seventeenth Congress. He was not a candidate for renomination.

He resumed the practice of law and served as deputy attorney general for Luzerne County in 1824. He was again elected to the Pennsylvania House of Representatives in 1827, and served until his death. He was burgess of Wilkes-Barre Borough in 1829 and 1830. He died in Wilkes-Barre in 1831. Interment in Hollenback Cemetery.

== Sources ==
- United States Congress. "George Denison (id: D000238)". Biographical Directory of the United States Congress.
- The Political Graveyard

U.S. House of Representatives
Preceded by John Murray; William Wilson	Member of the U.S. House of Representatives from Pennsylvania's 10th congressional district 1819–1823 alongside:John Murray, William Cox Ellis and Thomas Murray, Jr.	Succeeded by James S. Mitchell
