= Maine's at-large congressional district =

A now defunct district in the U.S. House of Representatives

- Obsolete district
- Created: 1820; 1883
- Eliminated: 1821; 1885
- Years active: 1820-1821; 1883-1885

When Maine became a state on March 15, 1820, it was apportioned one seat in the United States House of Representatives for the remainder of the 16th United States Congress until March 3, 1821. Starting with the 17th Congress, six more seats were reapportioned (moved, essentially) from Massachusetts and districts were established, thereby eliminating the at-large seat.

During the 48th Congress (1883–1885), Maine elected its four members of the United States House of Representatives at-large statewide, on a general ticket.

== List of members representing the district ==
Term		At-large seat											
Cong ress	Years	Member	Party	Electoral history									
16th	March 15, 1820 – December 11, 1820	John Holmes's seat moved from Massachusetts's 14th district but he resigned upon statehood (March 15, 1820) when elected U.S. Senator.											
16th	December 11, 1820 – March 3, 1821	Joseph Dane (Kennebunk)	Federalist	Elected November 7, 1820 to finish Holmes's term and seated December 11, 1820. Redistricted to the 1st district.									
Term		Seat A			Seat B			Seat C			Seat D		
Cong ress	Years	Member	Party	Electoral history	Member	Party	Electoral history	Member	Party	Electoral history	Member	Party	Electoral history
48th	March 4, 1883 – March 3, 1885	Thomas B. Reed (Portland)	Republican	Redistricted from the 1st district and re-elected in 1882. Redistricted to the 1st district.	Nelson Dingley Jr. (Lewiston)	Republican	Redistricted from the 2nd district and re-elected in 1882. Redistricted to the 2nd district.	Seth L. Milliken (Belfast)	Republican	Elected in 1882. Redistricted to the 3rd congressional district.	Charles A. Boutelle (Bangor)	Republican	Elected in 1882. Redistricted to the 4th congressional district.
