= William Salter Blackledge =

American politician

William Salter Blackledge (1793 – March 21, 1857) was an American slaveowner and politician who served one term as a U.S. Congressman from North Carolina between 1821 and 1823.

== Biography ==
Born in Pitt County, North Carolina, the son of William Blackledge, who would himself become a Congressman from North Carolina, Blackledge moved to Craven County, North Carolina, at an early age, eventually settling in New Bern. Blackledge attended the University of North Carolina at Chapel Hill, graduating in 1813.

=== Family ===
Blackledge married Mary Fonvielle Hatch (daughter of Edmund Hatch and Miriam Simmons) on April 26, 1815, and they had two children, Virginia and Richard. Like his father before him, William was a slaveowner.

=== Congress ===
Blackledge was elected to the North Carolina House of Commons in 1820 and soon afterward was elected to the United States House of Representatives to fill the vacancy created by the death of Jesse Slocumb and was then elected to the 17th U.S. Congress. Blackledge served in Congress from February 7, 1821, to March 3, 1823.

=== Death and burial ===
Blackledge died in 1857 in New Bern, where he is buried.

U.S. House of Representatives
Preceded by Jesse Slocumb	Member of the U.S. House of Representatives from North Carolina's 4th congressional district 1821–1823	Succeeded by Richard D. Spaight Jr.
