= 1821 New York's 6th congressional district special election =

On September 7, 1821, Representative-elect Selah Tuthill (DR) of New York's 6th district died before the first meeting of the 17th Congress. A special election was held November 6–8, 1821 to fill the resulting vacancy.

== Election results ==
Candidate	Party	Votes	Percent
Charles Borland, Jr.	Democratic-Republican	1,277	53.7%
John Duer	Democratic-Republican	1,097	46.1%

Borland took his seat December 3, 1821, at the start of the First Session o the 17th Congress

== See also ==
- List of special elections to the United States House of Representatives
