= 1820 Virginia's 1st congressional district special election =

On July 6, 1820, James Pindall (F) resigned from his position as Representative for Virginia's 1st district. A special election was held to fill the resulting vacancy.

== Election results ==
Candidate	Party	Votes	Percent
Edward B. Jackson	Democratic-Republican	1,236	60.6%
Isaac Leffler		721	35.4%
Thomas P. Moore		82	4.0%

Jackson took his seat on November 13, 1820

== See also ==
- List of special elections to the United States House of Representatives
