= 1820 Massachusetts's 13th congressional district special election =

A special election was held in 1820 in Massachusetts's 13th congressional district to fill a vacancy caused by the resignation of Edward Dowse (DR) on May 26, 1820

== Election results ==
Candidate	Party	Votes	Percent
William Eustis	Democratic-Republican	1,160	56.2%
James Richardson	Federalist	792	38.4%
Scattering		111	5.4%

Eustis took his seat November 13, 1820

== See also ==
- List of special elections to the United States House of Representatives
