= 1821 Kentucky's 8th congressional district special election =

On October 13, 1821, before the first meeting of the 17th Congress, Wingfield Bullock (DR) of Kentucky's 8th district died. A special election was held to fill the resulting vacancy.

== Election result ==
| Candidate | Party | Votes | Percent |
|---|---|---|---|
| James D. Breckinridge | Democratic-Republican | 1,685 | 56.3% |
| George B. Knight | | 1,173 | 39.2% |
| Norborne B. Beall | | 133 | 4.4% |

Breckinridge took his seat on January 2, 1822, a month into the 1st Session of the 17th Congress.

== See also ==
- List of special elections to the United States House of Representatives
