= Jesse Slocumb =

American politician

Member of the U.S. House of Representatives from North Carolina's 4th district
- In office March 4, 1817 – December 20, 1820
- Preceded by: William Gaston
- Succeeded by: William S. Blackledge

Personal details
- Born: August 20, 1780 Dudley, North Carolina
- Died: December 20, 1820 (aged 40) Washington, D.C.
- Resting place: Congressional Cemetery
- Party: Federalist

Jesse Slocumb (August 20, 1780 – December 20, 1820) was an American farmer and politician who served two terms as a U.S. representative from North Carolina from 1817 until his death in 1820.

== Early life ==
Slocumb was born on a plantation near Dudley in Wayne County, North Carolina on August 20, 1780. He was the son of Revolutionary patriots Col. Ezekiel Slocumb (1750–1840) and Mary Hooks Slocumb (1760–1836), who had distinguished herself at the Battle of Moore's Creek Bridge in 1776.

== Career ==
He completed the preparatory studies and then engaged in agricultural pursuits, on a plantation six miles southeast of Goldsboro, North Carolina.

=== Early political offices ===
He held several local offices and was a member of the court of pleas and quarter sessions of the county. He served as the register of deeds from 1802 until 1808.

=== Congress ===
He was elected as a Federalist to succeed William Gaston to represent North Carolina's 4th congressional district in the Fifteenth and Sixteenth Congresses and served from March 4, 1817, until his death. After his death, William S. Blackledge succeeded him.

== Personal life ==
Slocumb was married to Hannah Gray Green (1787–1848), a daughter of Joseph Green. Together, they were the parents of:

- Julia Ann Slocumb, who married David Bunting.
- Harriet Adeline Slocumb (1809–1875), who married Hiram Wildman Husted (1802–1868).
- John Charles Slocumb (b. 1811), who married Rachel R. Wright.
- Junius Greene Slocumb (b. 1815), who married Mary L. Boon.

Slocumb died of pleurisy in Washington, D.C., on December 20, 1820. He was buried in the Congressional Cemetery.

== See also ==
- List of members of the United States Congress who died in office (1790–1899)

U.S. House of Representatives
Preceded by William Gaston	Member of the U.S. House of Representatives from North Carolina's 4th congressional district 1817–1820	Succeeded by William S. Blackledge
