= 1820 Virginia's 20th congressional district special election =

On February 1, 1820, James Johnson (DR) of Virginia's 20th district resigned from his position as Representative. A special election was held to fill the resulting vacancy.

== Election results ==
Candidate	Party	Votes	Percent
John C. Gray	Democratic-Republican	967	52.6%
Arthur Smith	Democratic-Republican	873	47.4%

Gray took his seat on November 13, 1820.

== See also ==
- List of special elections to the United States House of Representatives
