= Thomas Murray Jr. =

American politician

Thomas Murray (1770 – August 26, 1823) was a member of the United States House of Representatives from Pennsylvania.

Thomas Murray was born near Pott's Grove, Pennsylvania. He was a member of the Pennsylvania House of Representatives beginning in 1813. Murray was elected as a Republican to the Seventeenth Congress to fill the vacancy caused by the resignation of William Cox Ellis. He declined to be a candidate for renomination in 1822. He died in East Chillisquaque Township, Pennsylvania, and was buried in Chillisquaque Cemetery, near Potts Grove.

He was a cousin of John Murray (1768-1834), who also served as a Congressman from Pennsylvania.

== Sources ==
- United States Congress. "Thomas Murray Jr. (id: M001115)". Biographical Directory of the United States Congress.
- The Political Graveyard

U.S. House of Representatives
Preceded by George Denison; William Cox Ellis	Member of the U.S. House of Representatives from Pennsylvania's 10th congressional district 1821–1823 alongside: George Denison	Succeeded by James S. Mitchell
