= 1820 Massachusetts's 1st congressional district special election =

A special election was held in Massachusetts's 1st congressional district on October 23, 1820, to fill a vacancy created by the resignation of Jonathan Mason (F) on May 15, 1820. As a majority was not achieved on the first ballot, a second ballot was held November 6, 1820

== Election results ==
Candidate	Party	First ballot		Second ballot	
Candidate	Party	Votes	Percent	Votes	Percent
Benjamin Gorham	Democratic-Republican (Note: Some sources cite Benjamin Gorham as a Federalist.)	1,635	48.3%	2,262	58.0%
Henry Orne	Democratic-Republican	882	26.1%		
Samuel Wells	Independent	866	25.6%	1,565	40.1%
Jesse Putnam	Unknown			55	1.4%
Scattering				20	0.5%

Gorham took his seat on November 27, 1820.

== See also ==
- List of special elections to the United States House of Representatives
