= Thomas Love Moore =

American politician

Thomas Love Moore (died 1862) was a nineteenth-century congressman and lawyer from Virginia.

Born near Charles Town, Virginia, Moore pursued an academic course as a child, studied law and was admitted to the bar. He was elected a Democratic-Republican to the United States House of Representatives to fill a vacancy, serving from 1820 to 1823. Afterwards, Moore continued practicing law in Warrenton, Virginia and made the principal speech upon the visit of General La Fayette to the town on August 23, 1825. He died in Warrenton in 1862 and was interred there in Warrenton Cemetery.

U.S. House of Representatives
Preceded by George Strother	Member of the U.S. House of Representatives from Virginia's 10th congressional district November 13, 1820 – March 4, 1823	Succeeded by William C. Rives
