= Charles Kinsey =

American politician

Charles Kinsey (1773 – June 25, 1849) was an American businessman and politician who served two terms as a U.S. Representative from New Jersey from 1817 to 1819, then again from 1820 to 1821.

== Early life and career ==
Kinsey was born in Baltimore, Maryland in 1773. He attended the common schools, and in early life engaged in the manufacture of paper. He moved to Bloomfield Township, Essex County, New Jersey and later to Paterson, New Jersey and New Prospect (now Waldwick), Bergen County, continuing in the paper industry.

In 1807 he invented a machine which allowed paper to be produced in one continuous roll. His correspondence with James Madison is in the Library of Congress.

== Political career ==
Kinsey was a member of New Jersey General Assembly in 1812, 1813, 1819, and 1826 and served in the New Jersey Legislative Council (now the New Jersey Senate) in 1814.

=== Congress ===
He was elected as a Democratic-Republican to the 15th Congress (March 4, 1817 - March 3, 1819), then elected to the 16th Congress to fill the vacancy caused by the resignation of John Condit and served from February 2, 1820 to March 3, 1821.

== Later career and death ==
After serving in the Congress, Kinsey continued to work in the paper industry. He then became a judge, serving as judge of the New Jersey Court of Common Pleas and of the orphans’ court of Bergen County, New Jersey from 1830 to 1845.

=== Death and burial ===
He died in New Prospect, New Jersey on June 25, 1849 and is buried in Union Cemetery, near New Prospect.

U.S. House of Representatives
Preceded by Lewis Condict	Member of the U.S. House of Representatives from New Jersey's at-large congressional district March 4, 1817 – March 3, 1819	Succeeded by John Condit
Preceded by John Condit	Member of the U.S. House of Representatives from New Jersey's at-large congressional district February 2, 1820 – March 3, 1821	Succeeded by Lewis Condict
