= James Duncan (Pennsylvania politician) =

American politician

James Duncan (1756 – June 24, 1844) was a member of the United States House of Representatives from Pennsylvania.

James Duncan born in Philadelphia, Pennsylvania. He attended the common schools and Princeton College. He served as the first prothonotary of Adams County, Pennsylvania. During the American Revolutionary War he was appointed as a lieutenant in Colonel Moses Hazen’s 2nd Canadian Regiment on November 3, 1776, and on March 25, 1778, was promoted to captain.

Duncan was elected as a Democratic-Republican to the Seventeenth Congress but resigned before Congress assembled. He died in Mercer County, Pennsylvania.

U.S. House of Representatives
Preceded by Andrew Boden; Thomas Grubb McCullough	Member of the U.S. House of Representatives from Pennsylvania's 5th congressional district 1821–1823 alongside: James McSherry	Succeeded by James McSherry; John Findlay
