= Lewis Condict =

American physician, politician (1772–1862)

Member of the U.S. House of Representatives from New Jersey
- In office March 4, 1811 – March 3, 1817
- Preceded by: William Helms
- Succeeded by: Charles Kinsey
- Constituency: At-large district (1811–13); 1st district (1813–15); At-large district (1815–17)
- In office October 9, 1821 – March 3, 1833
- Preceded by: Charles Kinsey
- Succeeded by: Thomas Lee
- Constituency: At-large district

Speaker of the New Jersey General Assembly
- In office 1807–1809
- In office 1837–1838

Member of the New Jersey General Assembly
- In office 1805–1809
- In office 1837–1838

Morris County Sheriff
- In office 1801–1803

Personal details
- Born: Lewis Condict; March 3, 1772 Morristown, Province of New Jersey, British America
- Died: May 26, 1862 (aged 90) Morristown, New Jersey, U.S.
- Party: Democratic-Republican; Jacksonian; Anti-Jacksonian; Whig; Constitutional Union
- Education: University of Pennsylvania

Lewis Condict (March 3, 1772 – May 26, 1862) was a medical doctor, and the United States representative from New Jersey. He was the 24th President of the Medical Society of New Jersey.

== Biography ==
Born in Morristown in the Province of New Jersey, he attended the common schools, graduated from the medical department of the University of Pennsylvania in Philadelphia in 1794, and commenced practice in Morristown. He was sheriff of Morris County from 1801 to 1803 and was a member of the commission for adjusting the boundary line between the States of New York and New Jersey in 1804. He was a member of the New Jersey General Assembly from 1805 to 1809 and served as speaker the last two years.

Condict was elected as a Democratic-Republican to the Twelfth, Thirteenth, and Fourteenth Congresses, serving from March 4, 1811, to March 3, 1817. He was president of the Medical Society of New Jersey in 1816 and 1819. Again elected as a Democratic-Republican in a special election to the Seventeenth Congress, he was then re-elected to the Eighteenth Congress. He was re-elected as an Adams candidate to the Nineteenth and Twentieth Congresses and was re-elected as an Anti-Jacksonian candidate to the Twenty-first and Twenty-second Congresses, serving from October 9, 1821, to March 3, 1833. While in Congress he was chairman of the Committee on Revisal and Unfinished Business (Fourteenth Congress) and a member of the Committee on Expenditures on Public Buildings (Fourteenth Congress). He declined to be a candidate for renomination in 1832, and was elected trustee of Princeton College in 1827, and served in this capacity until 1861, when he resigned. He was one of the incorporators of the Morris and Essex Railroad Co. and became its first president in 1835. In 1837 and 1838 he was again a member of the State house of assembly, and served as speaker. He was a presidential elector on the Whig ticket in 1840. He was succeeded by William Wright as president of the railroad in 1843. In 1860, his name was on the letter that issued the call for the Constitutional Union Party Convention. He died in Morristown; interment was in the cemetery of the Presbyterian Church.

== Legacy ==
Lewis Condict was a nephew of Silas Condict, a Continental Congressman from New Jersey.

U.S. House of Representatives
Preceded by William Helms	Member of the U.S. House of Representatives from New Jersey's at-large congressional district March 4, 1811 – March 3, 1813	Succeeded by Charles Kinsey
Preceded by N/A	Member of the U.S. House of Representatives from New Jersey's 1st congressional district March 4, 1813 – March 3, 1815	Succeeded by N/A
Preceded by Seat restored	Member of the U.S. House of Representatives from New Jersey's at-large congressional district March 4, 1815 – March 3, 1817	Succeeded by Charles Kinsey
Preceded by Charles Kinsey	Member of the U.S. House of Representatives from New Jersey's at-large congressional district October 9, 1821 – March 3, 1833	Succeeded by Thomas Lee
