= Joseph Dane =

American politician (1778–1858)

Member of the Maine Senate
- In office 1829

Member of the U.S. House of Representatives from Maine
- In office November 6, 1820 – March 3, 1823
- Preceded by: District established
- Succeeded by: William Burleigh
- Constituency: At-large district (1820–1821); 1st district (1821–1823)

Personal details
- Born: October 25, 1778 Beverly, Massachusetts, U.S.
- Died: May 1, 1858 (aged 79) Kennebunk, Maine, U.S.
- Party: Federalist
- Education: Harvard University

Joseph Dane (October 25, 1778 – May 1, 1858) was a United States representative from Maine, serving from 1820 to 1823.

== Biography ==
Dane was born in Beverly, Massachusetts, on October 25, 1778. He received his early education in Beverly, attended Phillips Academy in Andover, Massachusetts, and graduated from Harvard University in 1799.

He studied law, was admitted to the bar in 1802 and commenced practice in Kennebunk, Maine (until 1820 a district of Massachusetts). He was a delegate to the Massachusetts constitutional conventions in 1816 and 1819. He was chosen a member of the executive council of Massachusetts in 1817, but declined the office. He was elected as a Federalist to the Sixteenth Congress to fill the vacancy caused by the resignation of John Holmes. He was reelected to the Seventeenth Congress and served from November 6, 1820, to March 3, 1823. He was not a candidate for renomination in 1822.

He was elected a member of the Maine House of Representatives, and served in the Maine State Senate. He declined to serve as executive councilor of Maine in 1841. He died in Kennebunk on May 1, 1858. His interment was in Hope Cemetery.

U.S. House of Representatives
Preceded by New District	Member of the U.S. House of Representatives from Maine's at-large congressional district November 6, 1820 - March 3, 1821	Succeeded by District eliminated
Preceded by New District	Member of the U.S. House of Representatives from Maine's 1st congressional district March 4, 1821 - March 3, 1823	Succeeded by William Burleigh
