= Thomas G. McCullough =

American politician (1785–1848)

Member of the Pennsylvania House of Representatives from the Franklin County district
- In office 1831–1835

Member of the U.S. House of Representatives from Pennsylvania's 5th district
- In office October 17, 1820 – March 3, 1821 Serving with Andrew Boden
- Preceded by: Andrew Boden; David Fullerton
- Succeeded by: James Duncan; James McSherry

Personal details
- Born: Thomas Grubb McCullough; April 20, 1785 Greencastle, Pennsylvania, U.S.
- Died: September 10, 1848 (aged 63) Chambersburg, Pennsylvania, U.S.
- Party: Federalist
- Parent(s): Robert McCullough; Prudence Grubb
- Profession: Politician, lawyer

Military service
- Allegiance: United States
- Rank: Quartermaster
- Battles/wars: War of 1812

Thomas Grubb McCullough (April 20, 1785 – September 10, 1848) was an American politician and lawyer who served in the United States House of Representatives from 1820 to 1821, representing the 5th congressional district of Pennsylvania as a Federalist in the 16th United States Congress. He subsequently served in the Pennsylvania House of Representatives from 1831 to 1835.

== Early life and education ==
McCullough was born in Greencastle, Pennsylvania, on April 20, 1785, to Robert McCullough and Prudence Grubb. He attended common schools and studied law.

== Career ==
McCullough was admitted to the Franklin County bar on April 8, 1806.

McCullough served in the War of 1812 as a private and later as a quartermaster.

McCullough was elected as a Federalist to the 16th United States Congress to fill the vacancy caused by the resignation of incumbent David Fullerton. McCullough served from October 17, 1820, to March 3, 1821, representing the 5th congressional district of Pennsylvania.

Following his tenure in Congress, McCullough served in the Pennsylvania House of Representatives from 1831 to 1835, representing Franklin County. He also served as the first president of the Cumberland Valley Railroad company. Additionally, McCullough managed and edited the Franklin Repository.

At the time of his death in 1848, McCullough was president of the Bank of Chambersburg.

== Death ==
McCullough died at the age of 63 in Chambersburg, Pennsylvania, on September 10, 1848.

U.S. House of Representatives
Preceded by David Fullerton; Andrew Boden	Member of the U.S. House of Representatives from Pennsylvania's 5th congressional district 1820–1821; Served alongside: Andrew Boden	Succeeded by James Duncan; James McSherry
Pennsylvania House of Representatives
Preceded by —	Member of the Pennsylvania House of Representatives from the Franklin County district 1831–1835	Succeeded by —
