= 1826 Pennsylvania's 7th congressional district special election =

On August 14, 1826, Henry Wilson (J) of Pennsylvania's 7th district died. A special election was held to fill the resulting vacancy on October 10, 1826.

== Election results ==
Candidate	Party	Votes	Percent
Jacob Krebs	Jacksonian	5,063	63.4%
George Kerk	Federalist	2,929	36.6%

Krebs took his seat at the start of the Second Session of the 19th Congress.

== See also ==
- List of special elections to the United States House of Representatives
