= Church of the Fuller Concept =

New Thought group

The Church of the Fuller Concept was a New Thought group headed by Bernese Williamson. An African-American, she led an interracial residential group that lived near Andrews Field (now Joint Base Andrews) in Maryland and then in a town house at 1420 Sixteenth Street NW, Washington, D.C. Many of her group's practices paralleled those of Father Divine.
