= 1813 Pennsylvania's 7th congressional district special election =

A special election was held in Pennsylvania's 7th congressional district on October 12, 1813 to fill a vacancy left by the resignation of John M. Hyneman (DR) on August 2, 1813

== Election result ==
| Candidate | Party | Votes | Percent |
|---|---|---|---|
| Daniel Udree | Democratic-Republican | 2,016 | 61.4% |
| David Hottenstein | Federalist | 825 | 25.1% |
| David Kirby | | 445 | 13.% |

Udree took his seat on December 6, 1813

== See also ==
- List of special elections to the United States House of Representatives
