= Edna Rose Ritchings =

Wife of Father Divine and head of International Peace Mission (1925–2017)

Edna Rose Ritchings (April 4, 1925 – March 4, 2017) was the symbolic maintainer of the International Peace Mission movement. She is also known as Sweet Angel in the movement, or as Mrs. S. A. Divine or Mother Divine because she was the widow of the movement's leader, Father Divine. She assisted Father Divine, who claimed to be God, in his declining years. They lived in a manor home, which doubled as a Peace Mission headquarters and church known as the Woodmont manor & estate from 1953. It is located at Gladwyne, Pennsylvania, a Philadelphia suburb. Father Divine died in 1965 and was later interred in a crypt and mausoleum on the premises. The Woodmont estate continued to be the home of Mrs. Divine.

A Canadian convert from Vancouver, Ritchings was drawn to the movement in its decline in the early 1940s while she was still in high school. As did many adherents of Father Divine, she broke ties with her parents, and adopted a new name, "Sweet Angel". Moving to the then-headquarters of the movement in Philadelphia, Pennsylvania, she became one of Father Divine's personal secretaries. She proposed to him one day in the office by saying, "I want to marry you because I know you are God."

They were married in secret on April 29, 1946, in Washington, D.C. Ritchings was 21, and Father Divine about 65. The marriage was secret from most followers until Ritchings's visa expired in the summer of 1946, and Father Divine had to disclose it. The wedding date, April 29, thereafter became a celebrated anniversary in the movement.

Father Divine claimed to his flock that Ritchings was the spirit of his first wife reborn. His first wife, Peninniah (d. 1943), was also commonly called "Mother Divine". Reincarnation had not previously been part of Father Divine's doctrine, indeed he had said that the notion of an afterlife was absurd. To prove that it was a chaste marriage in accordance with his teachings, Father Divine assigned a female disciple to be Ritchings's constant companion.

Due to Father Divine's declining health, Mother Divine presided over an increasing number of Peace Mission banquets. Upon his death in 1965, she became the official leader of the movement, a position she continued to hold until her death. The Movement has nearly dwindled to extinction because few new converts have joined and Peace Mission doctrine forbids sex.

Mother S. A. Divine fought an attempt by Jim Jones, the head of Peoples Temple, to take over the movement in 1971. Jones based some of his doctrines on the International Peace Mission movement, and claimed to be the reincarnation of Father Divine. The two battled for years, with Divine sending spies into Jones' Peoples Temple and Jones doing the same to the Peace Mission. Converts to the Peoples Temple wrote Mother Divine trying to convince her that Jones was Father Divine until the infamous mass suicide in Jonestown, Guyana in 1978.

Mother Divine died on March 4, 2017, at the age of 91 at the Peace Mission's Woodmont Estate. A statement named "complications of old age" as the cause of death.
