= William Addams =

American politician (1777–1858)

Member of the U.S. House of Representatives from Pennsylvania's 7th district
- In office March 4, 1825 – March 3, 1829
- Preceded by: Daniel Udree, Henry Wilson
- Succeeded by: Henry A. P. Muhlenberg, Joseph Fry, Jr.

Member of the Pennsylvania House of Representatives
- In office 1823–1825

Personal details
- Born: April 11, 1777 Lancaster County, Pennsylvania
- Died: May 30, 1858 (aged 81)
- Party: Democratic

William Addams (April 11, 1777 – May 30, 1858) was an American politician who served as a Pennsylvania State Representative and United States Congressman, serving two terms in the U.S. House from 1825 to 1829.

== Life and career ==
Addams was born in Lancaster County, Pennsylvania in 1777.

He moved to Berks County, Pennsylvania near Reading, and served as auditor there in 1813 and 1814. He then served on the Berks County commission from 1814 through 1817.

In 1822, he was elected to the Pennsylvania House of Representatives, serving in that body through 1824.

=== Congress and later career ===
In 1825, he won election to the United States Congress as a Democrat, where he served through 1829.

Upon leaving the Congress, he served on the commission for the Deaf and Blind Institution for the states of New York and Ohio. He also served as an associate judge of Berks County from 1839 through 1842, and as a captain in the Reading City Troop. Outside of government, he worked pursuing farm interests.

== Death ==
He died in Spring Township, Pennsylvania, in 1858, and is buried in St. John's Church Cemetery, in Sinking Spring, Pennsylvania.

U.S. House of Representatives
Preceded by Daniel Udree; Henry Wilson	Member of the U.S. House of Representatives from Pennsylvania's 7th congressional district 1825–1829; 1825–1826 alongside: Henry Wilson; 1826–1827 alongside: Jacob Krebs; 1827–1829 alongside: Joseph Fry, Jr.	Succeeded by Henry A. P. Muhlenberg; Joseph Fry, Jr.
