= J. Washington Logue =

American politician (1863-1925)

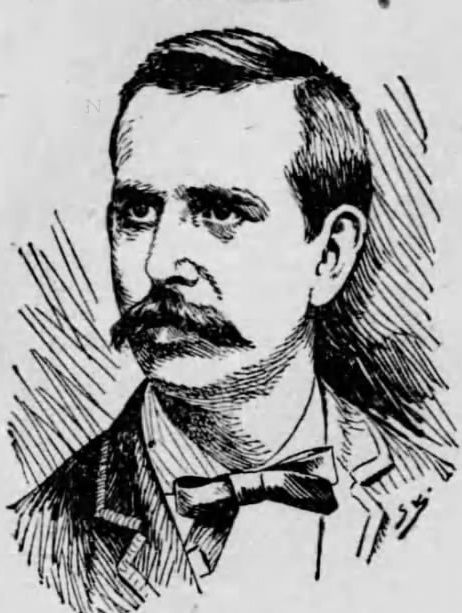

Member of the U.S. House of Representatives from Pennsylvania's 6th district
- In office March 4, 1913 – March 4, 1915
- Preceded by: George D. McCreary
- Succeeded by: George P. Darrow

Personal details
- Born: James Washington Logue; February 22, 1863 Philadelphia, Pennsylvania
- Died: August 27, 1925 (aged 62) Philadelphia, Pennsylvania
- Resting place: Holy Sepulchre Cemetery
- Party: Democratic

James Washington Logue (February 22, 1863 – August 27, 1925) was an American lawyer and Democratic member of the United States House of Representatives from Pennsylvania for one term from 1913 to 1915.

== Biography ==
J. Washington Logue was born in Philadelphia, Pennsylvania. He graduated from La Salle University in Philadelphia. He studied law, was admitted to the bar in 1888 and commenced the practice of his profession in Philadelphia.

=== Congress ===
In 1912, Logue was elected as a Democrat to the Sixty-third Congress.

=== Later career ===
He was an unsuccessful candidate for reelection in 1914. He was an unsuccessful candidate for Lieutenant Governor of Pennsylvania in 1918.

He resumed the practice of law in Philadelphia, and was a member of the speakers’ bureau of the Council of National Defense during World War I. He served as secretary of the board of inspectors of the Eastern Penitentiary in 1923.

=== Death and burial ===
He died in Philadelphia on August 27, 1925, and was interred at Holy Sepulchre Cemetery in Cheltenham Township, Pennsylvania.

Party political offices
Preceded by William T. Creasy	Democratic nominee for Lieutenant Governor of Pennsylvania; 1918	Succeeded by Robert E. Pattison Jr.
U.S. House of Representatives
Preceded by George D. McCreary	Member of the U.S. House of Representatives from Pennsylvania's 6th congressional district 1913–1915	Succeeded by George P. Darrow
