= Robert M. Yardley =

American politician

Robert Morris Yardley
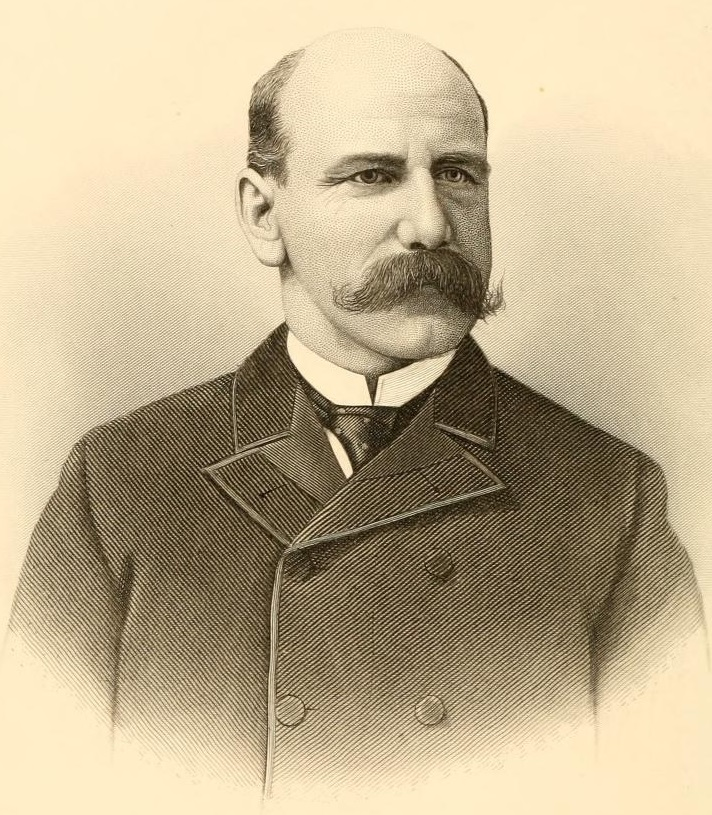

Member of the U.S. House of Representatives from Pennsylvania's 7th district
- In office March 4, 1887 – March 3, 1891
- Preceded by: Isaac Newton Evans
- Succeeded by: Edwin Hallowell

Personal details
- Born: October 9, 1850 Yardley, Pennsylvania, U.S.
- Died: December 9, 1902 (aged 52) Doylestown, Pennsylvania, U.S.
- Resting place: Doylestown Cemetery, Doylestown, Pennsylvania, U.S.
- Party: Republican
- Profession: Politician, lawyer

Robert Morris Yardley (October 9, 1850 – December 9, 1902) was a Republican member of the U.S. House of Representatives from Pennsylvania.

Robert M. Yardley was born in Yardley, Pennsylvania. He attended public and private schools in Yardley and Doylestown, Pennsylvania. He studied law, was admitted to the bar in 1872 and commenced practice in Doylestown. He served as district attorney of Bucks County, Pennsylvania from 1880 to 1884. He was a delegate to the 1884 Republican National Convention.

Yardley was elected as a Republican to the Fiftieth and Fifty-first Congresses. He served as chairman of the United States House Committee on Expenditures in the Department of War during the Fifty-first Congress. He declined to be a candidate for renomination in 1890.

He resumed the practice of law in Bucks County. He served as a member of the Doylestown School Board and as the director of several financial and public service corporations.

He died in Doylestown, aged 52, and is buried in Doylestown Cemetery.

== Sources ==
- United States Congress. "Robert M. Yardley (id: Y000007)". Biographical Directory of the United States Congress.

U.S. House of Representatives
Preceded by Isaac Newton Evans	Member of the U.S. House of Representatives from Pennsylvania's 7th congressional district 1887–1891	Succeeded by Edwin Hallowell
