= George D. McCreary =

American politician

George Deardorff McCreary
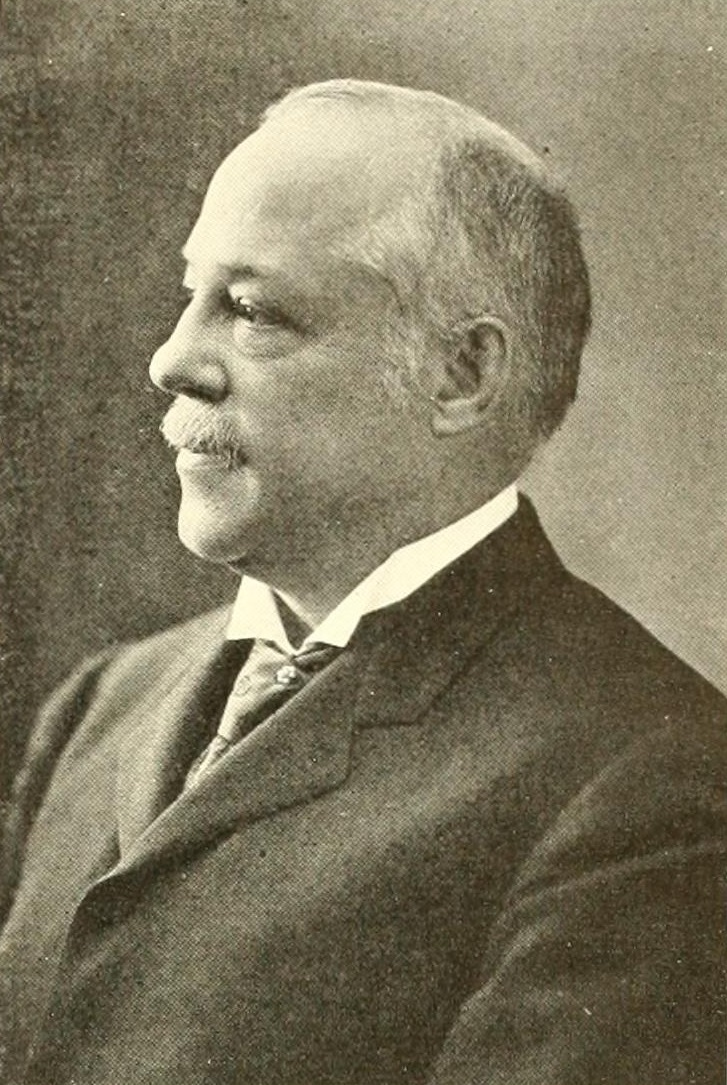

Member of the U.S. House of Representatives from Pennsylvania's 6th congressional district
- In office March 4, 1903 – March 3, 1913
- Preceded by: Thomas S. Butler
- Succeeded by: J. Washington Logue

Personal details
- Born: September 28, 1846 York Springs, Pennsylvania, U.S.
- Died: July 26, 1915 (aged 68) Philadelphia, Pennsylvania, U.S.
- Resting place: Laurel Hill Cemetery, Philadelphia, Pennsylvania, U.S.
- Party: Republican

George Deardorff McCreary (September 28, 1846 – July 26, 1915) was an American politician from Pennsylvania who served as a Republican member of the U.S. House of Representatives for Pennsylvania's 6th congressional district from 1903 to 1913.

Prior to his tenure in Congress, he was the city treasurer of Philadelphia from 1891 to 1895. He also worked in the coal and banking industries.

== Early life, education and business career ==
McCreary was born on September 28, 1846, at York Springs, Pennsylvania to John B. McCreary and Rachel Deardorff. He moved with his parents to Philadelphia and graduated from the Saunders Military Institute in 1864. He entered the University of Pennsylvania in 1864 but left in 1867 during his junior year to join the Honey Brook Coal Company of which his father was president.

He worked at the Whitney, McCreary & Kemmerer wholesale coal merchant company from 1870 to 1879.

After his father's death, he became a director in the Upper Lehigh Coal Company and the Nescopec Coal Company. He also worked in banking, including as vice-president of the Market Street National Bank.

== Political career ==
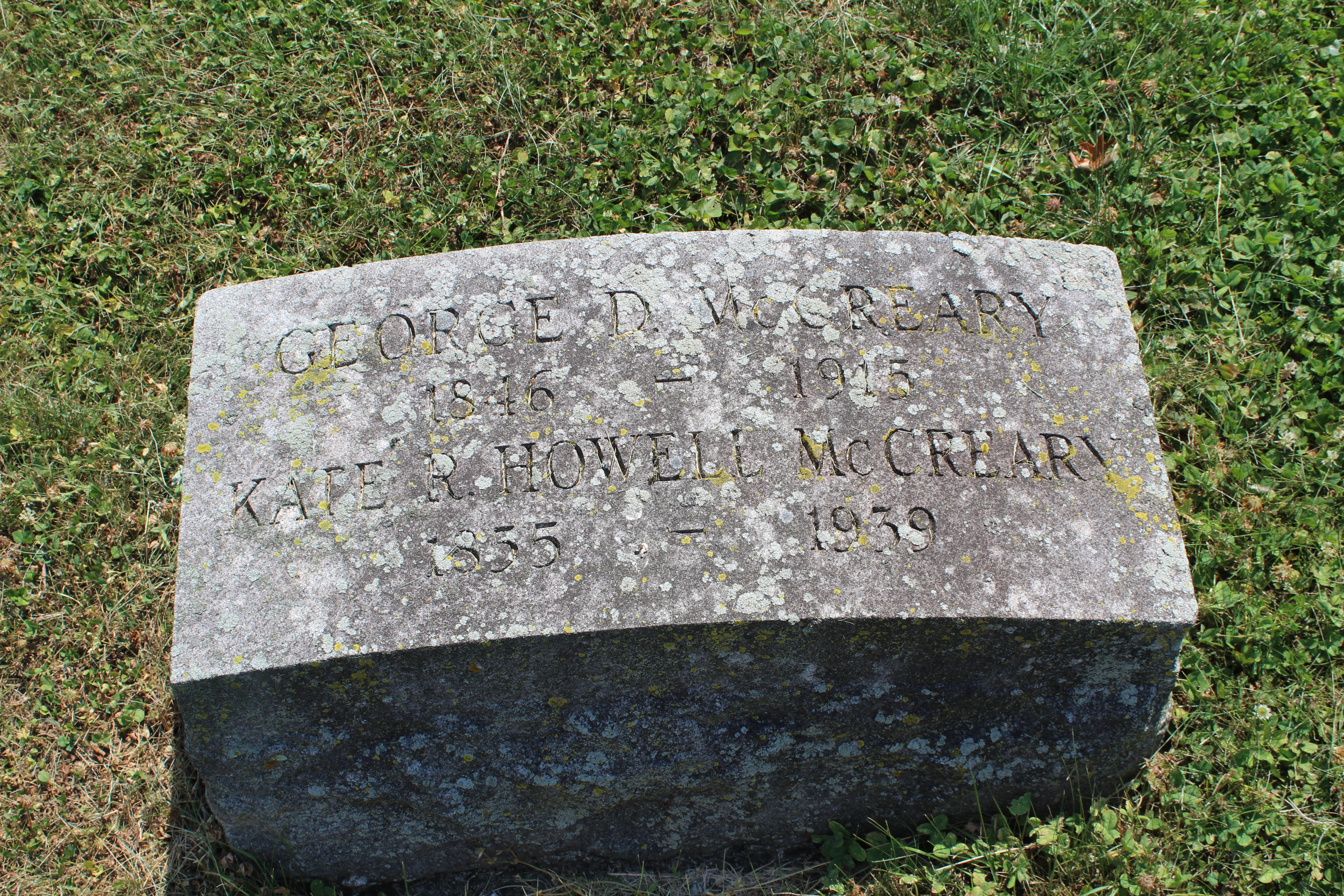
George D. McCreary tombstone in Laurel Hill Cemetery

McCreary was elected treasurer of the city and county of Philadelphia in November 1891, and served until 1895. He was then elected as a Republican to the Fifty-eighth and to the four succeeding Congresses, serving as chairman of the United States House Committee on Ventilation and Acoustics during the Sixty-first Congress and on the Banking and Currency Commission. He was one of 14 representatives, all Republicans, to oppose the Sixteenth Amendment to the United States Constitution, which imposed a federal income tax.

He was not a candidate for renomination in 1912.

== Personal life ==
On June 18, 1878, McCreary married Kate R. Howell.

McCreary supported several charities including the sponsorship of a tea service at the Sunday Breakfast Rescue Mission homeless shelter, the Red Bank Sanatorium, the Whosoever Will Mission and the Pennsylvania Humane Society. He was also the treasurer of the Philadelphia Sketch Club and vice president of the Franklin Reformatory School.

== Death and interment ==
McCreary died on July 26, 1915, in Philadelphia and was interred in Laurel Hill Cemetery.

U.S. House of Representatives
Preceded by Thomas S. Butler	Member of the U.S. House of Representatives from Pennsylvania's 6th congressional district March 4, 1903 – March 3, 1913	Succeeded by J. Washington Logue
