= Isaac Newton Evans =

American politician

Issac N. Evans
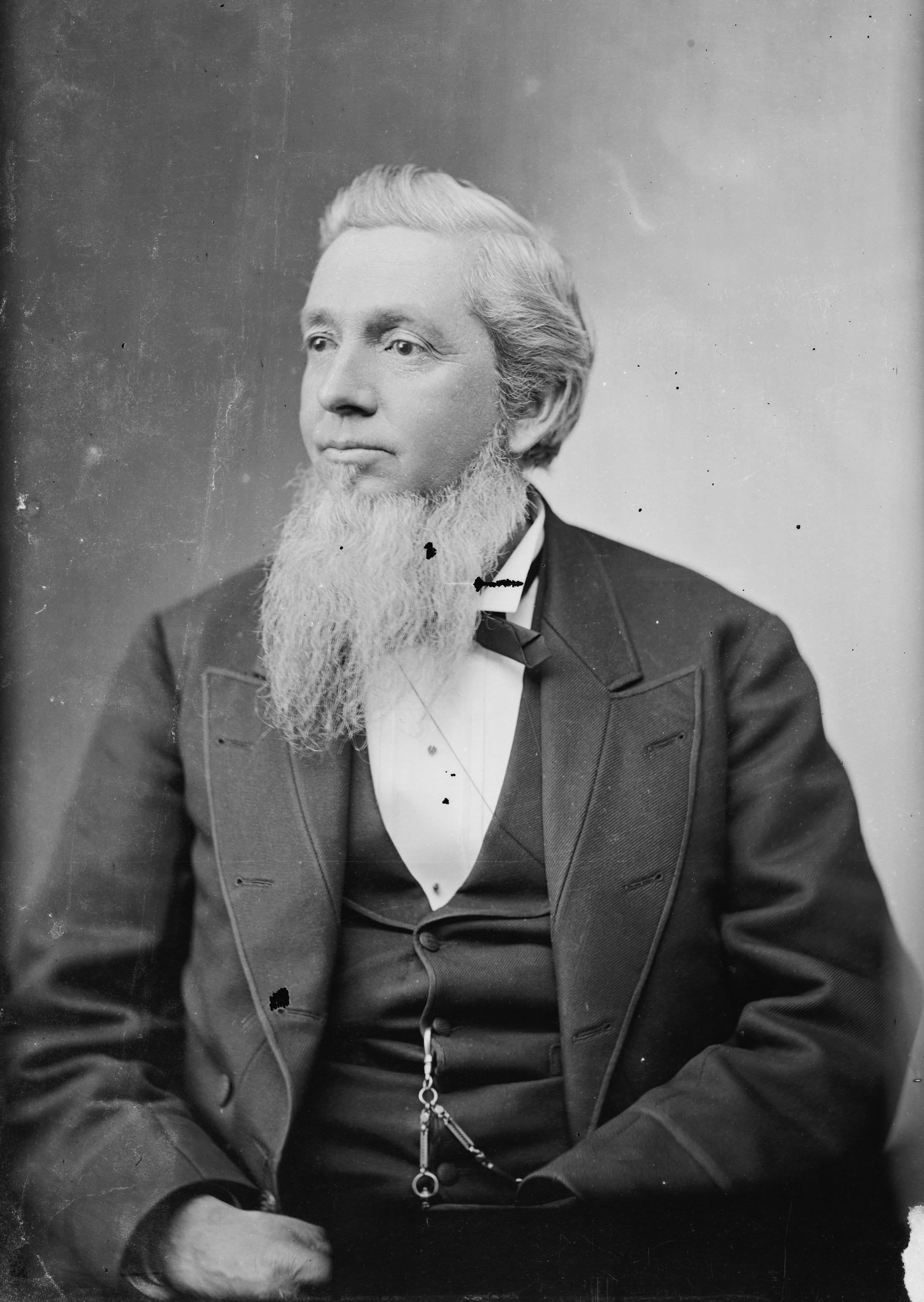

Member of the U.S. House of Representatives from Pennsylvania's 7th district
- In office March 4, 1883 – March 3, 1887
- Preceded by: William Godshalk
- Succeeded by: Robert Morris Yardley
- In office March 4, 1877 – March 3, 1879
- Preceded by: Alan Wood, Jr.
- Succeeded by: William Godshalk

Personal details
- Born: July 29, 1827 West Chester, Pennsylvania
- Died: December 3, 1901 (aged 74) Hatboro, Pennsylvania
- Party: Republican
- Education: Jefferson Medical College

Isaac Newton Evans (July 29, 1827 – December 3, 1901) was a Republican member of the U.S. House of Representatives from Pennsylvania.

== Biography ==
Isaac Newton Evans was born near present-day West Chester, Pennsylvania. He attended the common schools and was graduated from the medical department of Bowdoin College in Brunswick, Maine, in 1851 and from Jefferson Medical College in Philadelphia in 1852. He began the practice of medicine in Johnsville, Pennsylvania in 1852. He moved to Hatboro, Pennsylvania in 1856 and continued the practice of medicine. He served as president of the Hatboro National Bank.

Evans was elected as a Republican to the Forty-fifth Congress. He was not a candidate for renomination. He was again elected to the Forty-eighth and Forty-ninth Congresses.

He declined to be a candidate for renomination and returned to the practice of medicine, and was also engaged in the real estate business and banking. He died in Hatboro in 1901. He is buried in Friends Cemetery in Horsham, Pennsylvania.

U.S. House of Representatives
| Preceded by Alan Wood, Jr. | Member of the U.S. House of Representatives from Pennsylvania's 7th congressional district 1877–1879 | Succeeded by William Godshalk |
| Preceded by William Godshalk | Member of the U.S. House of Representatives from Pennsylvania's 7th congressional district 1883–1887 | Succeeded by Robert M. Yardley |
