= Ludwig Worman =

American politician

Member of the U.S. House of Representatives from Pennsylvania's 7th district
- In office March 4, 1821 – October 17, 1822
- Preceded by: Daniel Udree
- Succeeded by: Daniel Udree

Personal details
- Born: 1761 Tinicum Township, Bucks County, Pennsylvania
- Died: October 17, 1822 (aged 60–61) Earl Township, Pennsylvania, U.S.
- Party: Federalist Party

Ludwig Worman (1761 – October 17, 1822) was a Federalist member of the United States House of Representatives from Pennsylvania.

Worman was born in Tinicum Township, Pennsylvania. He learned the tanning business. He moved to Earl Township, Berks County, Pennsylvania in 1784 and was able to establish a tannery.

Worman was elected as a Federalist to the Seventeenth Congress and served until his death. Before his death, he was an unsuccessful candidate for reelection in 1822 to the Eighteenth Congress. He died in Earl Township in 1822 and was interred in Earl Township Cemetery.

== See also ==
- List of members of the United States Congress who died in office (1790–1899)

== Sources ==
- United States Congress. "Ludwig Worman (id: W000745)". Biographical Directory of the United States Congress.
- The Political Graveyard

U.S. House of Representatives
Preceded by Daniel Udree	Member of the U.S. House of Representatives from Pennsylvania's 7th congressional district 1821 - 1822	Succeeded by Daniel Udree
