= Irving P. Wanger =

American politician (1852–1940)

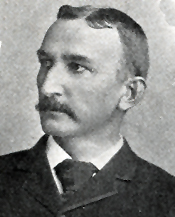

Irving Price Wanger (March 5, 1852 – January 14, 1940) was a Republican member of the U.S. House of Representatives from Pennsylvania.

Wanger was born in North Coventry Township, Pennsylvania, the son of Rebecca (Price) and George Wanger. He served as deputy prothonotary of Chester County, Pennsylvania, in 1871. He commenced the study of law at Norristown, Pennsylvania, in 1872. He served as deputy prothonotary of Montgomery County, Pennsylvania from 1873 to 1875. He was admitted to the bar in 1875, and commenced the practice of law in Norristown. He was as an elected burgess of Norristown in 1878. He was a delegate to the 1880 Republican National Convention. He was elected district attorney of Montgomery County in 1880 and again in 1886. He served as chairman of the Montgomery County Republican committee in 1889.

Wanger was an unsuccessful candidate for election in 1890. He was elected as a Republican to the Fifty-third and to the eight succeeding Congresses. He served as chairman of the United States House Committee on Expenditures in the Post Office Department during the Fifty-fifth through Sixty-first Congresses. He was an unsuccessful candidate for reelection in 1910. He lived for a short time in Wilmington, Delaware. He resumed the practice of his profession in Norristown and Media, Pennsylvania, in 1920. He died in Norristown in 1940 and was buried in Mount Zion Cemetery in Pottstown, Pennsylvania.

== Sources ==
- United States Congress. "Irving P. Wanger (id: W000122)". Biographical Directory of the United States Congress.
- The Political Graveyard

U.S. House of Representatives
Preceded by Edwin Hallowell	Member of the U.S. House of Representatives from Pennsylvania's 7th congressional district 1893–1903	Succeeded by Thomas S. Butler
Preceded by Howard Mutchler	Member of the U.S. House of Representatives from Pennsylvania's 8th congressional district 1903–1911	Succeeded by Robert E. Difenderfer
