= Edwin Hallowell =

American politician

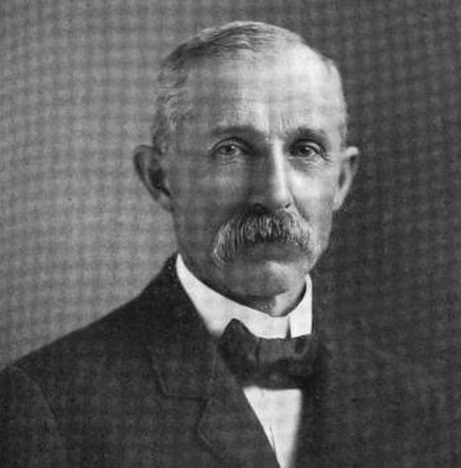

Member of the U.S. House of Representatives from Pennsylvania's 7th district
- In office March 4, 1891 – March 3, 1893
- Preceded by: Robert Morris Yardley
- Succeeded by: Irving Price Wanger

Personal details
- Born: Edwin Hallowell; April 2, 1844 Willow Grove, Pennsylvania
- Died: September 13, 1916 (aged 72) Abington, Pennsylvania
- Resting place: Abington Friends Burying Ground in Jenkintown, Pennsylvania
- Party: Democratic

Edwin Hallowell (April 2, 1844 – September 13, 1916) was an American farmer and politician who served one term as a Democratic member of the U.S. House of Representatives from Pennsylvania from 1891 to 1893.

== Biography ==
Edwin Hallowell was born near Willow Grove, Pennsylvania. He attended the public schools.

=== Early political career ===
He engaged in agricultural pursuits before being elected as a member of the Pennsylvania State House of Representatives, serving from 1876 to 1879. He was chairman of the Democratic county committee of Montgomery County, Pennsylvania, in 1886. He was a delegate to the 1888 Democratic National Convention.

=== Congress ===
Hallowell was elected as a Democrat to the Fifty-second Congress. He was a delegate to the Democratic Presidential Convention that nominated Grover Cleveland for president, second term. He was an unsuccessful candidate for reelection in 1892.

=== Later life ===
Owing to his physical disabilities Hallowell led a private life for the last years of his life. He was a bachelor and made his home with his sister on the farm on Plank Road in Abington Township. He resumed agricultural pursuits.

=== Death and burial ===
He died in Abington, Pennsylvania. He was interred in Abington Friends Burying Ground, Jenkintown, Pennsylvania.

== Notes ==
U.S. House of Representatives
Preceded by Robert M. Yardley	Member of the U.S. House of Representatives from Pennsylvania's 7th congressional district 1891–1893	Succeeded by Irving P. Wanger
