= International Peace Mission movement =

Religious movement founded by Father Divine in the 1920s

- Classification: Utopian/Social change church movement
- Region: United States
- Founder: Father Divine
- Origin: 1920s New York City
- Separated from: House Church movement of Samuel Morris / Father Jehovia
- Members: 19 as of 2015

The International Peace Mission movement is a syncretic religious movement founded and led by Father Divine. His followers worshiped Father Divine as a God. The core belief of the International Peace Mission movement is that everyone is treated equal in the eyes of God. Father Divine preached against sexism and racism. He was most active during and following the Great Depression in the 1930s. The International Peace Mission movement is thought to be a precursor of the civil rights movement. The International Peace Mission movement emphasized opposition to violence and war.

The International Peace Mission movement is built on the principles of Christianity, democracy, Americanism, brotherhood, and Judaism with the understanding that all religions teach the same basic truths. Movement members are taught not to discriminate based on race, color, or religion. The movement started in Brooklyn, New York, and then in Sayville, New York. Moving forward in 1942, the headquarters were relocated to Philadelphia, Pennsylvania. Father Divine organized rallies and prayers during World War II for his peace movement to oppose war. The International Peace Mission movement still focuses on promoting equality, peace, and social justice.

== Teachings and beliefs ==
The teachings of the movement are based on the following principles:

- Father Divine is God
- "Heaven" is a state of consciousness
- Unity of the world's religions
- Celibacy, Marriage to God
- Children shall be raised by assigned guardians
- Use of the USA flag and the English language worldwide
- Prohibition of smoking, drinking of alcoholic beverages, obscenity and receiving of gifts
- Public education
- Abandoning racial barriers
- Communal ownership of property and donation of goods and services
- Gender segregation

== Organization and structure ==
=== Leadership ===
The International Peace Mission movement was led by Father Divine up to his death in 1965. Father Divine's widow Mother Divine then succeeded her late husband and led the movement until her death in 2017.

=== Auxiliaries ===
An auxiliary are specific groups of people who are willing to support and help the International Peace Mission movement. There are three "auxiliaries" in the Peace Mission movement - the Rosebuds, for girls and young women, the Lily-buds for older, mature women and the Crusaders for males of all ages. Each auxiliary has specific duties, creeds and uniforms.

== Publications ==
There were two publications of the International Peace Mission movement: The Spoken Word (1934–1937) and the New Day (1936–1989). Both were available to members and the general public. These publications contained articles on issues of the day, as well as articles on world and local events.

== Rituals ==
=== Church services ===
The services consist of singing Peace Mission hymns and songs from popular culture. The singing is followed by the playing of taped sermons by past or present leaders. Talks by visiting speakers, if present, follow. Readings of the King James Bible and/or a Peace Mission publication are conducted. Services conclude with member testimonials about the power of Father Divine.

=== Holy Communion services ===
The "Holy Communion service" is the signature ritual that symbolizes the Peace Mission. It symbolized the provision of food to those who could not afford it during the Great Depression. The origins of the "holy banquet" are in the communal home meals served to Father Divine's followers before 1932. By the mid-1930s, these communal meals had become well-attended banquets, feeding thousands of people. Often, Father Divine would give impromptu speeches during the meal.

The Peace Mission viewed the banquets as the reinstatement of the "Christian love feast" mentioned in the New Testament and the Last Supper that Jesus Christ attended before his crucifixion.

=== Divine Marriage anniversary celebration ===
On April 29, 1946, interracial marriage of 70-year-old Father Divine to his 21-year-old Canadian-born secretary is called the "Marriage of Christ to his Church" and the "fusion between heaven and Earth" in Peace Mission theology. It is celebrated each year in April as an "international, interracial, universal holiday", according to Peace Mission literature.

Every year since 1948, Peace Mission members gather at Father Divine's home or at headquarters in order to celebrate a special Holy Communion service for the Divine marriage anniversary celebration.

=== Communal shareholding ===
Members of the Peace Mission were encouraged to pool their individual resources and invest in businesses, the profits of which were to be divided up and shared. During the 1930s, these properties and businesses were quite numerous. Peace Mission businesses included the Divine Lorraine and Divine Tracy Hotels in Philadelphia, farmlands in upstate New York and garages.

== History of the movement ==
=== Beginnings ===
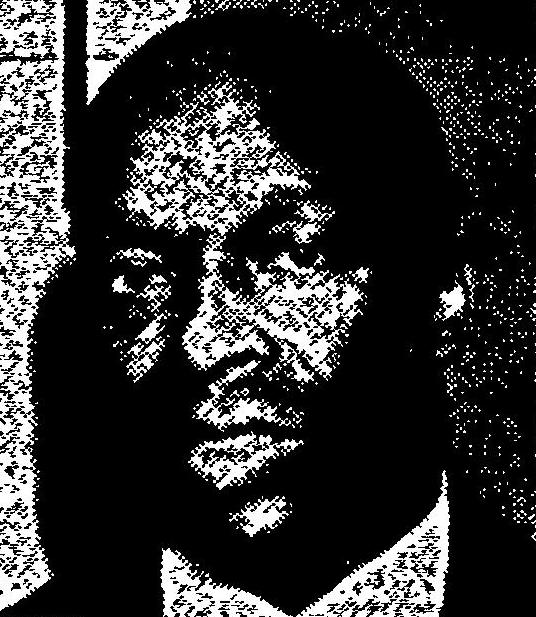
Father Divine

George Baker Jr attended a local store front Baptist Church, often preaching and teaching in the church's Sunday school, until 1907, when he became Samuel Morris's (Father Jehovia), first follower. Thus, George Baker Jr known to be "the Messenger". In 1912, Father Divine disagreed that Father Jehovia was God and anyone could be God. As result, Father Divine parted ways and declared himself a God. Father Divine traveled down South to Georgia to preach and got into conflicts with local ministers and was sentenced to 60 days on a chain gang. Upon his release, he attracted a following of mostly black women in Valdosta, Georgia. On February 6, 1914, several followers' husbands and local preachers had him arrested for lunacy and Divine was incarcerated in an insane asylum. Father Divine was later released and pronounced mentally sound in spite of his "maniacal" beliefs, and admonished to leave the state.

=== 1914–1932: the proto-movement ===
In 1914, Father Divine traveled to Brooklyn, New York, with a moderate amount of followers and an all-black congregation. In 1919, he and his followers moved the commune to Sayville, New York on Long Island. Father Divine and his followers were the first black homeowners in town. In this period, his movement underwent sustained growth, as he ran the entire movement from his communal house. Father Divine held free weekly banquets and helped newcomers find jobs. He began attracting many white followers as well as black in the late 1920s. On May 8, 1931, Father Divine and his followers was arrested and charged with disturbing the peace that was brought by his neighbors.

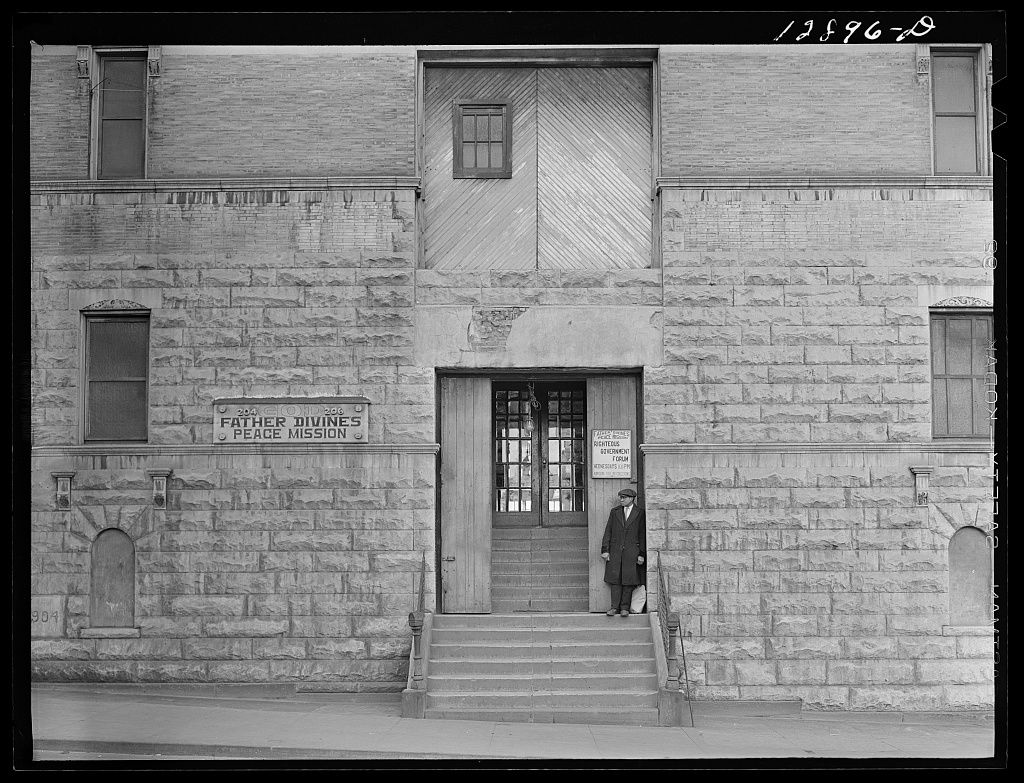
International Peace Mission movement established over 100 Heavens in the Northeastern United States.

=== 1930s: movement zenith ===
Press coverage and notoriety increased dramatically for the Peace Mission after the arrest for disturbing the peace ended in first conviction, then the death of the presiding judge and Father Divine's subsequent release. The impression that Justice Smith's death was an act of divine retribution was perpetuated by the press, which failed to report Smith's prior heart problems and implied the death to be more sudden and unexpected than it was. The New York based media frenzy following the death made this event and its repercussions the single most famous moment of Father Divine's life. Articles on Father Divine propelled his popularity. By December, his followers began renting buildings in New York City for Father Divine to speak in. Soon, he often had several engagements on a single night.

In May 1932, Peace Mission meetings were regularly held at the Rockland and throughout New York and New Jersey. Father Divine had many supporters in throughout the world, more specifically Washington State and California. During this period of expansions, several Peace Mission branch communes were opened in New York and New Jersey. In this period of time, Father Divine's followers finally named the movement: "the International Peace Mission movement".

Father Divine moved to Harlem, New York, and accumulated a significant following in the black community. Furthermore, Father Divine established a headquarters in Harlem, New York. The members of the movement held most deeds but they contributed toward Father Divine's comfortable lifestyle. As a result, purchasing several hotels, members could live and seek jobs inexpensively. Also, the Peace Mission movement opened several budget enterprises, such as restaurants and clothing shops.

=== 1930s: International expansion and alliance with the Communist Party USA ===
In 1934, Peace Mission branches had opened in Los Angeles, California, and Seattle, Washington. The gatherings occurred in France, Switzerland, Canada, and Australia. Although, the membership totals were overstated in the press. Thus, Father Divine was called upon to offer political endorsements.

In early 1934, an alliance between Father Divine and the Communist Party USA began. The Peace Mission Movement practiced a form of communal socialism which profits from individual Peace Mission businesses were redistributed within the movement. Father Divine became impressed with the Communist Party's commitment to civil rights and resulted in an alliance being formed.

In spite of this alliance, the movement was largely apolitical until the Harlem Riot of 1935. Based on a rumor of police killing a black teenager, the Harlem Riot left four dead and caused over $1 million in property damage in Father Divine's neighborhood. Father Divine's outrage at this and other racial injustices fueled a keener interest in politics. In January 1936, the movement organized a convention to create political platforms incorporating the doctrine of Father Divine. Among other things, the delegates opposed school segregation and many of Franklin D. Roosevelt's social programs, which they interpreted as "handouts". Other planks called for the nationalization and government control of the major banks and industries.

=== 1930s and 1940s: movement scandals ===
Reports of improper sexual conduct would slant much of the public perception of the Peace Mission throughout its stay in the public spotlight. Several highly publicized Peace Mission sex and other scandals became part of the public record on the Mission.

=== 1940s: the death of Peninniah (Mother) Divine, the rise of Sweet Angel and the doctrine of reincarnation ===
Mrs Peninniah Divine, also called Mother Divine, had been married to Father Divine some 30 years at the time of her death. She died in seclusion amongst what was, at the time, the Peace Mission's farms and other rural upstate New York business collectively called the "Promised Land". She was buried in an unknown and unmarked grave. Peninniah Divine had been prominently active in the itinerant ministry of George Baker Jr from the Valdosta, Georgia, days and was regularly covered in the Peace Mission press up till about 1940 or 1941 before coverage of her simply stopped and she disappeared from Peace Mission life.

Almost no one knew that Mother Divine had died until 70-year-old Father Divine's remarriage to his 21-year-old white Canadian secretary, Edna Rose Ritchings, also known as "Sweet Angel" in the movement, became public knowledge after her visa status came up for review. Father Divine claimed that his young secretary was his deceased wife returned.

Critics of the movement believed that the elderly and supposedly celibate Father Divine's controversial marriage to his 21-year-old secretary would destroy the movement. The Peace Mission response was the institutionalization of celebrating the wedding anniversary. Despite predictions by some in the press and others of the imminent collapse of the entire movement, the marriage became one of the most important and celebrated events in the Peace Mission.

Reincarnation had not previously been an emphasized part of Father Divine's doctrine and did not become a regular part of his theology until around 1960. Followers at the time believed that Peninniah was an exceptional case and viewed her "return" as "Sweet Angel" as a special miracle of Father Divine. The doctrine of reincarnation is now an accepted and regular teaching of the Peace Mission.

=== 1940s and the early 1950s: reorganization, Woodmont and the long decline of the movement ===
In this period and through 1942, Father Divine centralized the movement into a formal church. Although this reduced the number of outposts, it put the organization under firmer control in the northeast. Three formal churches were set up in 1941, the Circle Mission Church the Unity Mission Church and the Palace Mission Church. Although they all had the same constitution and doctrines, they were financially independent. This redundancy made the movement stronger against legal attacks.

The Peace Mission's political focus on anti-lynching measures became more resolved. By 1940, its followers had gathered 250,000 signatures in favor of an anti-lynching bill that Father Divine had written.

In 1953 the movement acquired its signature parsonage Woodmont, a 72 acres (0.29 km^{2}) hilltop estate in Gladwyne, Pennsylvania, outside of Philadelphia. This French Gothic manor served as the home of Father Divine until his death in 1965.

=== 1950s: civil rights and the movement ===
In 1951, The Peace Mission advocated reparations be paid to the descendants of African slaves. It also advocated in favor of integrated neighborhoods. However, unlike its earlier joint meetings and public marches with the Communist Party USA during its zenith decade of the 1930s, it did not participate in the burgeoning American Civil Rights Movement of the 1950s and 1960s.

=== 1950s: the red scare and Peace Mission anti-communism ===
By the 1950s, which included the beginnings of the modern US civil rights movement, the cold war between the US and the USSR was at an all-time high. The Peace Mission movement's depression era alliance with the radical left still rankled many. The Peace Mission response, starting around 1948/49, was to go on the anti-communist offensive, with Father Divine regularly lambasting communism while praising the "American way", even reversing some of his most pointed criticisms of the American system from the 1930s. Which he would continue to do until his death in 1965.

=== 1960-1990s: Sweet Angel Divine leads the Peace Mission ===
Father Divine died on September 6, 1965. He was succeeded at the helm of the movement by his widow, Mrs. 'Sweet Angel' Divine (Edna Rose Ritchings a.k.a. "Mother Divine").

Mother Divine continued to preside over the "Holy Communion banquets" that are central to Peace Mission worship, and she continued to have her husband's taped and recorded messages played continuously at Peace Mission functions, in addition to distributing copies of his speeches in Peace Mission literature.

Over the decades, few new members have replaced the followers who die; thus the ability to sustain and maintain Peace Mission properties and publications has been severely degraded. The Peace Mission central newspaper, the New Day, first published in the movement's heyday year of 1936, ceased publication in 1989.

=== Early 21st century: contraction and status ===
The Peace Mission Movement has steadily contracted from its 1930s heyday through the first decades of the 21st century. On March 4, 2017, Mother Divine died at the Woodmont estate at age 91.

Due to the decline in members, several once-central and iconic Peace Mission properties of the 1940s and 1950s, including the Divine Tracy Hotel and the Divine Lorraine Hotel, were sold by the movement before Mother Divine's death. Other properties of the Peace Mission including the Circle Mission Church, Home and Training School Inc in Philadelphia, Pennsylvania, which had served as the movement's international headquarters, the original commune home in Sayville, Long Island, New York, at 72 Macon Street, which had been Father Divine's primary residence from 1919 to 1932 and was the Peace Mission's New York headquarters, were sold off after Mother Divine's death. As of 2025 the movement's remaining signature property is the 73-acre, hilltop Woodmont manor house and estate outside of Philadelphia, Pennsylvania.

Woodmont is the location of the Palace Mission church and is also the official residence of the remaining Peace Mission leadership. The Peace Mission provides scheduled tours of both the Woodmont manor home and Father Divine's nearby mausoleum called the "Shrine To Life". On October 29, 2017, approximately 200 guests convened to celebrate the dedication and grand opening of the Father Divine Library and Museum at Woodmont.

== Bibliography ==
- God Comes to America: Father Divine and the Peace Mission Movement, Kenneth E. Burnham, Boston: Lambeth Press, 1979 ISBN 0-931186-01-3
- Father Divine and the Struggle for Racial Equality, Robert Weisbrot, Urbana: University of Illinois Press, 1983 ISBN 0-7910-1122-4
- God, Harlem U.S.A: the Father Divine story, Jill Watts, Los Angeles: University of California Press, 1992 ISBN 0-520-07455-6
- Father Divine: Holy Husband, Sara Harris, Harriet Crittenden, Literary Licensing, LLC, October 15, 2011 ISBN 978-1258210502
- The Peace Mission Movement, Mother Divine, New York: Anno Domini Father Divine Publications, 1982 ISBN 978-0960907816
- Promised Land: Father Divine's Interracial Communities in Ulster County, New York, Carleton Mabee, Fleischmanns: Purple Mountain Press, 2008 ISBN 1-930098-93-6
- Ronald M. White, New Thought Influences on Father Divine (Masters Thesis, Miami University, Oxford, Ohio, 1980). Abstract
