= Pennsylvania's 7th congressional district =

U.S. House district for Pennsylvania

Coordinates: 39°54′N 75°55′W

- Interactive map of district boundaries since January 3, 2023
- Representative: Ryan Mackenzie; R–Lower Macungie Township
- Population (2025): 789,164
- Median household income: $88,451
- Ethnicity: 68.6% White; 19.1% Hispanic; 5.5% Black; 3.1% Asian; 3.1% Two or more races; 0.6% other
- Cook PVI: R+1

Pennsylvania's 7th congressional district includes all of Carbon, Lehigh, and Northampton Counties, and parts of Monroe County. It has been represented by Republican Ryan Mackenzie since 2025.

From March 2003 through 2018, the district incorporated parts of the Philadelphia suburbs, including most of Delaware County, along with portions of Chester, Montgomery, Berks, and Lancaster Counties. The district exhibited extreme non-congruity during that time as a result of gerrymandering. On January 22, 2018, the Supreme Court of Pennsylvania ruled that the map violated the state constitution, and in February, it issued its own district boundaries for use in the 2018 elections and representation thereafter. Most of the population in the old 7th district became part of a new 5th district, encompassing all of Delaware County and parts of South Philadelphia; while most of the old 15th district became the new 7th district. In the 2020 redistricting cycle, Carbon County was added into the district, in exchange for the area around East Stroudsburg in Monroe County.

Pat Meehan, who had represented the old 7th district since 2011, resigned on April 27, 2018, amid a sexual harassment case. Mary Gay Scanlon won the special election on November 6, 2018, to replace him for the remainder of his term, and she served for slightly less than two months as the last representative for the old 7th district before being transferred to the newly redrawn 5th district. Susan Wild won the general election in the newly redrawn 7th district, and she took office January 3, 2019.

In 2024, Susan Wild would lose re-election to current Republican Representative Ryan Mackenzie.

The district was identified as a presidential bellwether by Sabato's Crystal Ball, having voted for the Electoral College winner in the past five presidential elections as of 2024.

== Recent election results from statewide races ==
Year	Office	Results
2008	President	Obama 56–43%
2008	Attorney General	Morganelli 59–41%
2008	Auditor General	Wagner 59–41%
2010	Senate	Toomey 53–47%
2010	Governor	Corbett 55–45%
2012	President	Obama 53–47%
2012	Senate	Casey Jr. 54–46%
2014	Governor	Wolf 55–45%
2016	President	Trump 50–47%
2016	Senate	Toomey 50–46%
2016	Attorney General	Shapiro 51–49%
2016	Auditor General	Brown 48–47%
2016	Treasurer	Torsella 50–45%
2018	Senate	Casey Jr. 54–44%
2018	Governor	Wolf 57–41%
2020	President	Biden 50–49%
2020	Attorney General	Shapiro 50–47%
2020	Auditor General	DeFoor 49–46%
2020	Treasurer	Garrity 49–48%
2022	Senate	Fetterman 51–46%
2022	Governor	Shapiro 55–43%
2024	President	Trump 51–48%
2024	Senate	McCormick 50–48%
2024	Attorney General	Sunday 51–46%
2024	Auditor General	DeFoor 51–46%
2024	Treasurer	Garrity 52–46%

== Geography ==
The 2003–2012 version of the district was located in southeastern Pennsylvania. It contained the western and northwestern suburbs of Philadelphia. It consisted of the majority of Delaware County (except for the City of Chester and some of the eastern boroughs), a portion of Chester County east of West Chester in the affluent Philadelphia Main Line area, and a portion of southern Montgomery County centered on Upper Merion Township.

The 2013–2018 version of the district contained most of Delaware County outside of the City of Chester and the heavily African American townships and boroughs in the eastern portion of the county. It also contained parts of central Montgomery County, southern portions of Berks County, southern and central portions of Chester County, and a small portion of eastern Lancaster County. The District as it stood in October 2016 was named on NPR's On the Media as an egregious example of gerrymandering. The shape of the district was described as "Goofy kicking Donald Duck. The only point that is essentially contiguous there is Goofy's foot in Donald Duck's rear end. ... However these district lines are the building blocks of democracy, and when they get as perverted and twisted as this, it leads to deeply undemocratic outcomes." The Washington Post listed it as one of the ten most gerrymandered districts in the country.

On February 19, 2018, the Supreme Court of Pennsylvania released a new congressional map after lawmakers had failed to agree on a map that would reduce gerrymandering. The map substantially redrew the District, relocating it to the Lehigh Valley. The newly redrawn district includes all of Lehigh County and Northampton County as well as parts of Monroe County.

== Composition ==
Carbon County (23)
All 23 municipalities

Lehigh County (25)

All 25 municipalities

Monroe County (3)

Eldred Township, Polk Township, Ross Township (part; also 8th)

Northampton County (38)

All 38 municipalities

== List of members representing the district ==
=== 1791–1793: one seat ===
District created in 1791.

Representative	Party	Years	Cong ress	Electoral history
District first established March 4, 1791
Thomas Hartley (York)	Pro-Administration	March 4, 1791 – March 3, 1793	2nd	Redistricted from the at-large district and re-elected in 1791. Redistricted to the at-large district.

District redistricted in 1793 to the at-large district.

=== 1795–1823: one seat ===
District restored in 1795.

Member	Party	Years	Cong ress	Electoral history
John W. Kittera (Lancaster)	Federalist	March 4, 1795 – March 3, 1801	4th 5th 6th	Redistricted from the at-large district and re-elected in 1794. Re-elected in 1796. Re-elected in 1798. Retired.
Thomas Boude (Columbia)	Federalist	March 4, 1801 – March 3, 1803	7th	Elected in 1800. Redistricted to the 3rd district and lost re-election.
John Rea (Chambersburg)	Democratic-Republican	March 4, 1803 – March 3, 1811	8th 9th 10th 11th	Elected in 1802. Re-elected in 1804. Re-elected in 1806. Re-elected in 1808. Lost re-election.
William Piper (Bloodyrun)	Democratic-Republican	March 4, 1811 – March 3, 1813	12th	Elected in 1810. Redistricted to the 8th district.
John M. Hyneman (Reading)	Democratic-Republican	March 4, 1813 – August 2, 1813	13th	Redistricted from the 3rd district and re-elected in 1812. Resigned.
Vacant		August 2, 1813 – October 12, 1813	13th	
Daniel Udree (Reading)	Democratic-Republican	October 12, 1813 – March 3, 1815	13th	Elected October 12, 1813, to finish Hyneman's term and seated December 6, 1813. Lost re-election.
Joseph Hiester (Reading)	Democratic-Republican	March 4, 1815 – December ????, 1820	14th 15th 16th	Elected in 1814. Re-elected in 1816. Resigned to become Governor of Pennsylvania.
Vacant		December ????, 1820 – December 26, 1820	16th	
Daniel Udree (Reading)	Democratic-Republican	December 26, 1820 – March 3, 1821	16th	Elected December 10, 1820, to finish Hiester's term and seated January 8, 1821. Had not been a candidate for the next term.
Ludwig Worman (Pottstown)	Federalist	March 4, 1821 – October 17, 1822	17th	Elected in 1820. Lost re-election and then died.
Vacant		October 17, 1822 – December 10, 1822	17th	
Daniel Udree (Reading)	Democratic-Republican	December 10, 1822 – March 3, 1823	17th	Elected in 1822. Later elected December 10, 1822, to finish Worman's term and seated December 23, 1822.

=== 1823–1833: two seats ===
Member	Party	Years	Cong ress	Electoral history	Member	Party	Years	Cong ress	Electoral history
Henry Wilson (Allentown)	Democratic-Republican (Note: Supported the Jackson faction in the 1824 United States presidential election.)	March 4, 1823 – March 3, 1825	18th	Elected in 1822. Re-elected in 1824. Died.	Daniel Udree (Reading)	Democratic-Republican	March 4, 1823 – March 3, 1825	18th	Re-elected in 1822. Retired.
Henry Wilson (Allentown)	Jacksonian	March 4, 1825 – August 24, 1826	19th	Elected in 1822. Re-elected in 1824. Died.	William Addams (Reading)	Jacksonian	March 4, 1825 – March 3, 1829	19th 20th	Elected in 1824. Re-elected in 1826. Lost re-election.
Vacant		August 24, 1826 – December 4, 1826	19th		William Addams (Reading)	Jacksonian	March 4, 1825 – March 3, 1829	19th 20th	Elected in 1824. Re-elected in 1826. Lost re-election.
Jacob Krebs (Orwigsburg)	Jacksonian	December 4, 1826 – March 3, 1827	19th	Elected October 10, 1826, to finish Wilson's term and seated December 4, 1826. Was not a candidate for the next term.	William Addams (Reading)	Jacksonian	March 4, 1825 – March 3, 1829	19th 20th	Elected in 1824. Re-elected in 1826. Lost re-election.
Joseph Fry Jr. (Fryburg)	Jacksonian	March 4, 1827 – March 3, 1831	20th 21st	Elected in 1826. Re-elected in 1828. Retired.	William Addams (Reading)	Jacksonian	March 4, 1825 – March 3, 1829	19th 20th	Elected in 1824. Re-elected in 1826. Lost re-election.
Joseph Fry Jr. (Fryburg)	Jacksonian	March 4, 1827 – March 3, 1831	20th 21st	Elected in 1826. Re-elected in 1828. Retired.	Henry A. P. Muhlenberg (Reading)	Jacksonian	March 4, 1829 – March 3, 1833	21st 22nd	Elected in 1828. Re-elected in 1830. Redistricted to the 9th district.
Henry King (Allentown)	Jacksonian	March 4, 1831 – March 3, 1833	22nd	Elected in 1830. Redistricted to the 8th district.	Henry A. P. Muhlenberg (Reading)	Jacksonian	March 4, 1829 – March 3, 1833	21st 22nd	Elected in 1828. Re-elected in 1830. Redistricted to the 9th district.

=== 1833–present: one seat ===
Member	Party	Years	Cong ress	Electoral history	District location
David D. Wagener (Easton)	Jacksonian	March 4, 1833 – March 3, 1837	23rd 24th	Elected in 1832; Re-elected in 1834; Re-elected in 1836; Re-elected in 1838 [data missing]	1833–1843 [data missing]
David D. Wagener (Easton)	Democratic	March 4, 1837 – March 3, 1841	25th 26th	Elected in 1832; Re-elected in 1834; Re-elected in 1836; Re-elected in 1838 [data missing]	1833–1843 [data missing]
John Westbrook (Dingmans Ferry)	Democratic	March 4, 1841 – March 3, 1843	27th	Elected in 1840. Retired.	1833–1843 [data missing]
Abraham R. McIlvaine (Brandywine)	Whig	March 4, 1843 – March 3, 1849	28th 29th 30th	Elected in 1843. Re-elected in 1844. Re-elected in 1846. Lost renomination.	1843–1853 [data missing]
Jesse C. Dickey (New London)	Whig	March 4, 1849 – March 3, 1851	31st	Elected in 1848. Lost re-election.	1843–1853 [data missing]
John A. Morrison (Cochranville)	Democratic	March 4, 1851 – March 3, 1853	32nd	Elected in 1850. [data missing]	1843–1853 [data missing]
Samuel A. Bridges (Allentown)	Democratic	March 4, 1853 – March 3, 1855	33rd	Elected in 1852. Lost re-election.	1853–1863 [data missing]
Samuel C. Bradshaw (Quakertown)	Opposition	March 4, 1855 – March 3, 1857	34th	Elected in 1854. Lost re-election.	1853–1863 [data missing]
Henry Chapman (Doylestown)	Democratic	March 4, 1857 – March 3, 1859	35th	Elected in 1856. Retired.	1853–1863 [data missing]
Henry C. Longnecker (Allentown)	Republican	March 4, 1859 – March 3, 1861	36th	Elected in 1858. [data missing]	1853–1863 [data missing]
Thomas B. Cooper (Coopersburg)	Democratic	March 4, 1861 – April 4, 1862	37th	Elected in 1860. Died.	1853–1863 [data missing]
Vacant		April 4, 1862 – June 3, 1862	37th		1853–1863 [data missing]
John D. Stiles (Allentown)	Democratic	June 3, 1862 – March 3, 1863	37th	Elected to finish Cooper's term. Redistricted to the 6th district.	1853–1863 [data missing]
John M. Broomall (Media)	Republican	March 4, 1863 – March 3, 1869	38th 39th 40th	Elected in 1862. Re-elected in 1864. Re-elected in 1866. Retired.	1863–1873 [data missing]
Washington Townsend (West Chester)	Republican	March 4, 1869 – March 3, 1875	41st 42nd 43rd	Elected in 1868. Re-elected in 1870. Re-elected in 1872. Redistricted to the 6th district.	1863–1873 [data missing]
Washington Townsend (West Chester)	Republican	March 4, 1869 – March 3, 1875	41st 42nd 43rd	Elected in 1868. Re-elected in 1870. Re-elected in 1872. Redistricted to the 6th district.	1873–1883 [data missing]
Alan Wood Jr. (Conshohocken)	Republican	March 4, 1875 – March 3, 1877	44th	Elected in 1874. Retired.	1873–1883 [data missing]
Isaac N. Evans (Hatboro)	Republican	March 4, 1877 – March 3, 1879	45th	Elected in 1876. Retired.	1873–1883 [data missing]
William Godshalk (New Britain)	Republican	March 4, 1879 – March 3, 1883	46th 47th	Elected in 1878. Re-elected in 1880. Retired.	1873–1883 [data missing]
Isaac N. Evans (Hatboro)	Republican	March 4, 1883 – March 3, 1887	48th 49th	Elected in 1882. Re-elected in 1884. Retired.	1883–1889 [data missing]
Robert M. Yardley (Doylestown)	Republican	March 4, 1887 – March 3, 1891	50th 51st	Elected in 1886. Re-elected in 1888. Retired.	1883–1889 [data missing]
Robert M. Yardley (Doylestown)	Republican	March 4, 1887 – March 3, 1891	50th 51st	Elected in 1886. Re-elected in 1888. Retired.	1889–1893 [data missing]
Edwin Hallowell (Willow Grove)	Democratic	March 4, 1891 – March 3, 1893	52nd	Elected in 1890. Lost re-election.	1889–1893 [data missing]
Irving P. Wanger (Norristown)	Republican	March 4, 1893 – March 3, 1903	53rd 54th 55th 56th 57th	Elected in 1892. Re-elected in 1894. Re-elected in 1896. Re-elected in 1898. Re-elected in 1900. Redistricted to the 8th district.	1893–1903
Thomas S. Butler (West Chester)	Republican	March 4, 1903 – March 3, 1923	58th 59th 60th 61st 62nd 63rd 64th 65th 66th 67th	Redistricted from the 6th district and re-elected in 1902. Re-elected in 1904. Re-elected in 1906. Re-elected in 1908. Re-elected in 1910. Re-elected in 1912. Re-elected in 1914. Re-elected in 1916. Re-elected in 1918. Re-elected in 1920. Redistricted to the 8th district.	1903–1913
Thomas S. Butler (West Chester)	Republican	March 4, 1903 – March 3, 1923	58th 59th 60th 61st 62nd 63rd 64th 65th 66th 67th	Redistricted from the 6th district and re-elected in 1902. Re-elected in 1904. Re-elected in 1906. Re-elected in 1908. Re-elected in 1910. Re-elected in 1912. Re-elected in 1914. Re-elected in 1916. Re-elected in 1918. Re-elected in 1920. Redistricted to the 8th district.	1913–1923
George P. Darrow (Philadelphia)	Republican	March 4, 1923 – January 3, 1937	68th 69th 70th 71st 72nd 73rd 74th	Redistricted from the 6th district and re-elected in 1922. Re-elected in 1924. Re-elected in 1926. Re-elected in 1928. Re-elected in 1930. Re-elected in 1932. Re-elected in 1934. Lost re-election.	1923–1933
George P. Darrow (Philadelphia)	Republican	March 4, 1923 – January 3, 1937	68th 69th 70th 71st 72nd 73rd 74th	Redistricted from the 6th district and re-elected in 1922. Re-elected in 1924. Re-elected in 1926. Re-elected in 1928. Re-elected in 1930. Re-elected in 1932. Re-elected in 1934. Lost re-election.	1933–1943
Ira W. Drew (Philadelphia)	Democratic	January 3, 1937 – January 3, 1939	75th	Elected in 1936. Lost re-election.	1933–1943
George P. Darrow (Philadelphia)	Republican	January 3, 1939 – January 3, 1941	76th	Elected in 1938. Retired.	1933–1943
Hugh Scott (Philadelphia)	Republican	January 3, 1941 – January 3, 1945	77th 78th	Elected in 1940. Re-elected in 1942. Lost re-election.	1933–1943
Hugh Scott (Philadelphia)	Republican	January 3, 1941 – January 3, 1945	77th 78th	Elected in 1940. Re-elected in 1942. Lost re-election.	1943–1945
James Wolfenden (Upper Darby)	Republican	January 3, 1945 – January 3, 1947	79th	Redistricted from the 8th district and re-elected in 1944. Retired.	1945–1953
E. Wallace Chadwick (Rose Valley)	Republican	January 3, 1947 – January 3, 1949	80th	Elected in 1946. Lost renomination.	1945–1953
Benjamin F. James (Rosemont)	Republican	January 3, 1949 – January 3, 1959	81st 82nd 83rd 84th 85th	Elected in 1948. Re-elected in 1950. Re-elected in 1952. Re-elected in 1954. Re-elected in 1956. Retired.	1945–1953
Benjamin F. James (Rosemont)	Republican	January 3, 1949 – January 3, 1959	81st 82nd 83rd 84th 85th	Elected in 1948. Re-elected in 1950. Re-elected in 1952. Re-elected in 1954. Re-elected in 1956. Retired.	1953–1963
William H. Milliken Jr. (Sharon Hill)	Republican	January 3, 1959 – January 3, 1965	86th 87th 88th	Elected in 1958. Re-elected in 1960. Re-elected in 1962. Retired.	1953–1963
William H. Milliken Jr. (Sharon Hill)	Republican	January 3, 1959 – January 3, 1965	86th 87th 88th	Elected in 1958. Re-elected in 1960. Re-elected in 1962. Retired.	1963–1967
George Watkins (West Chester)	Republican	January 3, 1965 – January 3, 1967	89th	Elected in 1964. Redistricted to the 9th district.	1963–1967
Lawrence G. Williams (Springfield)	Republican	January 3, 1967 – January 3, 1975	90th 91st 92nd 93rd	Elected in 1966. Re-elected in 1968. Re-elected in 1970. Re-elected in 1972. Lost re-election.	
Lawrence G. Williams (Springfield)	Republican	January 3, 1967 – January 3, 1975	90th 91st 92nd 93rd	Elected in 1966. Re-elected in 1968. Re-elected in 1970. Re-elected in 1972. Lost re-election.	1973–1983
Bob Edgar (Middletown)	Democratic	January 3, 1975 – January 3, 1987	94th 95th 96th 97th 98th 99th	Elected in 1974. Re-elected in 1976. Re-elected in 1978. Re-elected in 1980. Re-elected in 1982. Re-elected in 1984. Retired to run for U.S. Senator.	1973–1983
Bob Edgar (Middletown)	Democratic	January 3, 1975 – January 3, 1987	94th 95th 96th 97th 98th 99th	Elected in 1974. Re-elected in 1976. Re-elected in 1978. Re-elected in 1980. Re-elected in 1982. Re-elected in 1984. Retired to run for U.S. Senator.	1983–1993
Curt Weldon (Glen Mills)	Republican	January 3, 1987 – January 3, 2007	100th 101st 102nd 103rd 104th 105th 106th 107th 108th 109th	Elected in 1986. Re-elected in 1988. Re-elected in 1990. Re-elected in 1992. Re-elected in 1994. Re-elected in 1996. Re-elected in 1998. Re-elected in 2000. Re-elected in 2002. Re-elected in 2004. Lost re-election.	1983–1993
Curt Weldon (Glen Mills)	Republican	January 3, 1987 – January 3, 2007	100th 101st 102nd 103rd 104th 105th 106th 107th 108th 109th	Elected in 1986. Re-elected in 1988. Re-elected in 1990. Re-elected in 1992. Re-elected in 1994. Re-elected in 1996. Re-elected in 1998. Re-elected in 2000. Re-elected in 2002. Re-elected in 2004. Lost re-election.	1993–2003
Curt Weldon (Glen Mills)	Republican	January 3, 1987 – January 3, 2007	100th 101st 102nd 103rd 104th 105th 106th 107th 108th 109th	Elected in 1986. Re-elected in 1988. Re-elected in 1990. Re-elected in 1992. Re-elected in 1994. Re-elected in 1996. Re-elected in 1998. Re-elected in 2000. Re-elected in 2002. Re-elected in 2004. Lost re-election.	2003–2013
Joe Sestak (Edgmont)	Democratic	January 3, 2007 – January 3, 2011	110th 111th	Elected in 2006. Re-elected in 2008. Retired to run for U.S. Senator.	2003–2013
Pat Meehan (Drexel Hill)	Republican	January 3, 2011 – April 27, 2018	112th 113th 114th 115th	Elected in 2010. Re-elected in 2012. Re-elected in 2014. Re-elected in 2016. Resigned.	2003–2013
Pat Meehan (Drexel Hill)	Republican	January 3, 2011 – April 27, 2018	112th 113th 114th 115th	Elected in 2010. Re-elected in 2012. Re-elected in 2014. Re-elected in 2016. Resigned.	2013–2019
Vacant		April 27, 2018 – November 13, 2018	115th		2013–2019
Mary Gay Scanlon (Swarthmore)	Democratic	November 13, 2018 – January 3, 2019	115th	Elected to finish Meehan's term. Redistricted to the 5th district.	2013–2019
Susan Wild (Allentown)	Democratic	January 3, 2019 – January 3, 2025	116th 117th 118th	Redistricted from the 15th district and elected to full term in 2018. Re-elected in 2020. Re-elected in 2022. Lost re-election.	2019–2023
Susan Wild (Allentown)	Democratic	January 3, 2019 – January 3, 2025	116th 117th 118th	Redistricted from the 15th district and elected to full term in 2018. Re-elected in 2020. Re-elected in 2022. Lost re-election.	2023–present
Ryan Mackenzie (Lower Macungie Township)	Republican	January 3, 2025 – present	119th	Elected in 2024. Lost re-election.	2023–present
Bob Brooks (Nazareth)	Democratic	Assuming office on January 3, 2027		Elected in 2026.	2023–present

== Recent election results ==
=== 2022 election ===
Pennsylvania's 7th congressional district, 2022
Party	Candidate	Votes	%
Democratic	Susan Wild (incumbent)	151,364	51.0
Republican	Lisa Scheller	145,527	49.0
Total votes		296,891	100.0
Democratic hold			

=== 2024 election ===
Pennsylvania's 7th congressional district, 2024
Party	Candidate	Votes	%
Republican	Ryan Mackenzie	203,688	50.5
Democratic	Susan Wild (incumbent)	199,626	49.5
Total votes		403,314	100.0
Republican gain from Democratic			

== See also ==
- List of United States congressional districts
- Pennsylvania's congressional districts
