= William Godshalk =

American politician and Union Army soldier (1817–1891)

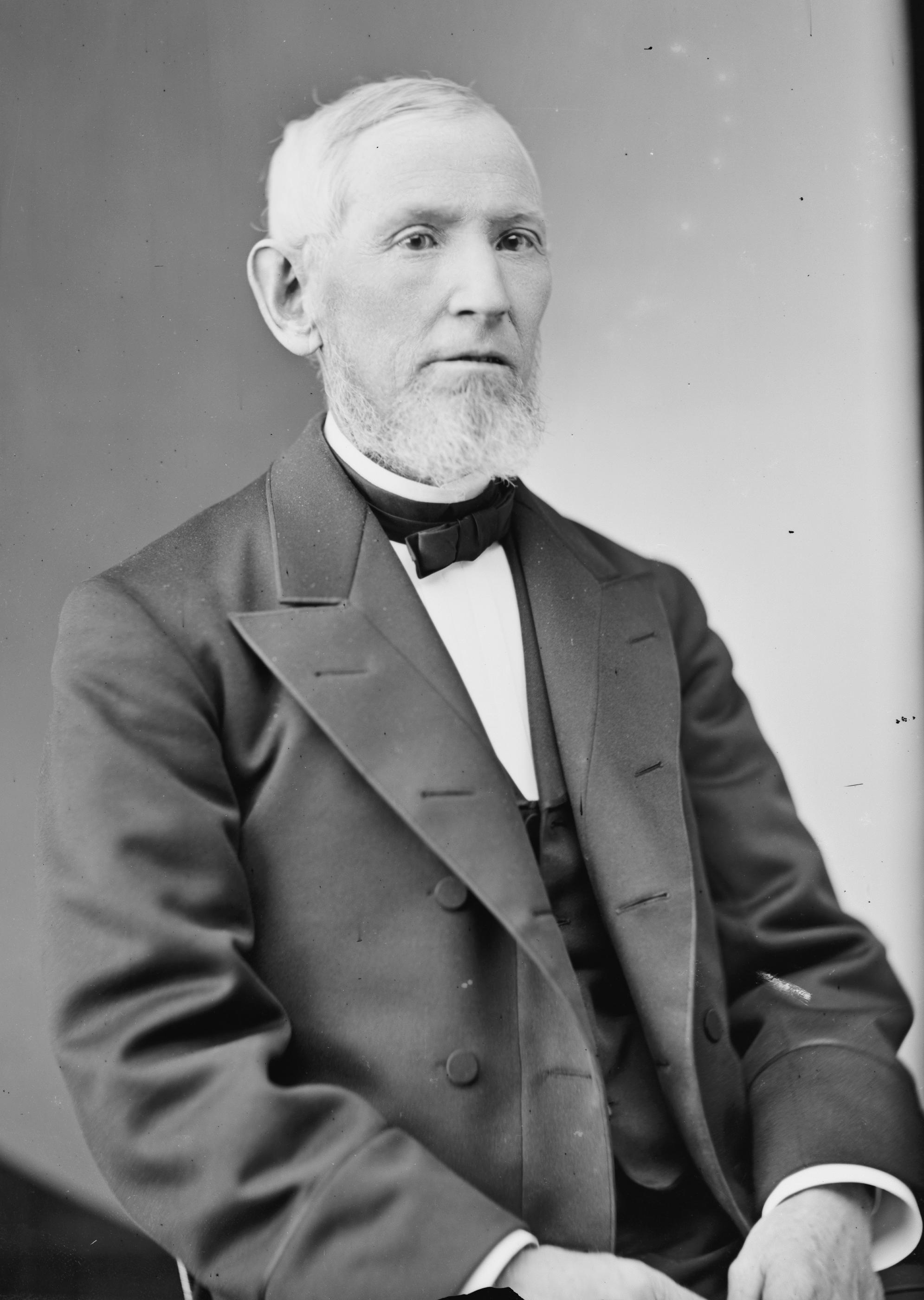

Member of the U.S. House of Representatives from Pennsylvania's 7th district
- In office March 4, 1879 – March 3, 1883
- Preceded by: Isaac Newton Evans
- Succeeded by: Isaac Newton Evans

Personal details
- Born: October 25, 1817 East Nottingham Township, Pennsylvania
- Died: February 6, 1891 (aged 73) New Britain, Pennsylvania
- Party: Republican

William Godshalk (October 25, 1817 – February 6, 1891) was a Republican member of the U.S. House of Representatives from Pennsylvania.

== Biography ==
William Godshalk was born in East Nottingham Township, Pennsylvania. He moved with his parents to Bucks County, Pennsylvania, in 1818. He attended the common schools and Union Academy in Doylestown, Pennsylvania. He learned the miller’s trade and, in 1847, engaged in milling in Doylestown Township. During the American Civil War he served in the Union Army as a private in Company K, One Hundred and Fifty-third Regiment, Pennsylvania Volunteer Infantry, from October 11, 1862, to July 23, 1863.

He was an unsuccessful candidate for election to the Pennsylvania State Senate in 1864. He was elected as an associate judge of Bucks County in October 1871 and served five years.

Godshalk was elected as a Republican to the Forty-sixth and Forty-seventh Congresses. He returned to milling, and died in New Britain, Pennsylvania. Interment in the Presbyterian Church Cemetery in Doylestown.

U.S. House of Representatives
Preceded by Isaac N. Evans	Member of the U.S. House of Representatives from Pennsylvania's 7th congressional district 1879–1883	Succeeded by Isaac N. Evans
