= Joseph Fry Jr. =

American politician

Member of the U.S. House of Representatives from Pennsylvania's 7th district
- In office March 4, 1827 – March 3, 1831
- Preceded by: See below
- Succeeded by: Henry A. P. Muhlenberg

Member of the Pennsylvania Senate for the 8th district
- In office 1817–1821

Member of the Pennsylvania House of Representatives
- In office 1816–1817

Personal details
- Born: August 4, 1781 Saucon, Province of Pennsylvania, British America
- Died: August 15, 1860 (aged 79) Allentown, Pennsylvania, U.S.
- Party: Jacksonian

Joseph Fry Jr. (August 4, 1781 – August 15, 1860) was an American politician who served as a Jacksonian member of the U.S. House of Representatives for Pennsylvania's 7th congressional district from 1827 to 1831.

== Biography ==
Joseph Fry Jr. was born in present-day Upper Saucon Township, Pennsylvania. He participated in mercantile pursuits in Fryburg, later renamed Coopersburg. He was a member of the Pennsylvania House of Representatives in 1816 and 1817, and served in the Pennsylvania State Senate for the 8th district from 1817 to 1821. He served in the State militia and attained the rank of colonel.

Fry was elected to the Twentieth Congress and reelected as a Jacksonian to the Twenty-first Congress. He was not a candidate for renomination in 1830. He resumed business activities, and was a member of the State constitutional convention in 1837 and 1838. On August 15, 1860 Joseph Fry Jr died at the age of 79 in Allentown, Pennsylvania.

Pennsylvania House of Representatives
Preceded by	Member of the Pennsylvania House of Representatives; 1816–1817	Succeeded by
Pennsylvania State Senate
Preceded by John Erwin	Member of the Pennsylvania Senate, 8th district 1817-1821	Succeeded by Henry Winter
U.S. House of Representatives
Preceded by William Addams; Jacob Krebs	Member of the U.S. House of Representatives from Pennsylvania's 7th congressional district 1827–1831; 1827–1829 alongside: William Addams; 1829–1831 alongside: Henry A. P. Muhlenberg	Succeeded by Henry King
