= Ira W. Drew =

American politician

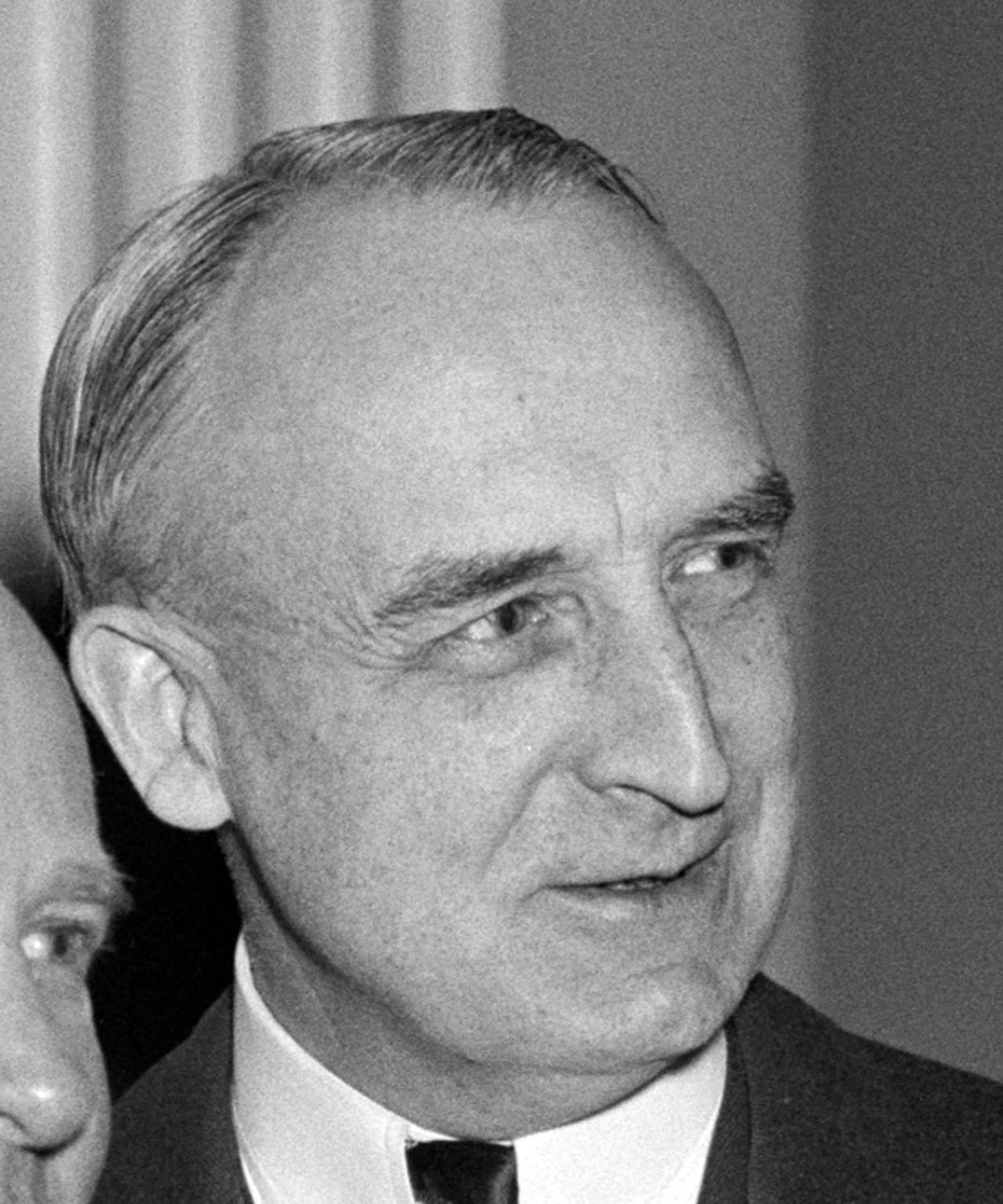

Member of the U.S. House of Representatives from Pennsylvania's 7th district
- In office January 3, 1937 – January 3, 1939
- Preceded by: George P. Darrow
- Succeeded by: George P. Darrow

Personal details
- Born: August 31, 1878 Hardwick, Vermont
- Died: February 12, 1972 (aged 93) Philadelphia, Pennsylvania
- Party: Democratic

Ira Walton Drew (August 31, 1878 – February 12, 1972) was a Democratic member of the U.S. House of Representatives from Pennsylvania and osteopathic physician.

== Biography ==
Drew was born in Hardwick, Vermont. He apprenticed as a printer, becoming a journeyman in 1899. He was a newspaper reporter in Burlington, Vermont, from 1899 through 1906, and a reporter and news editor in Boston, Massachusetts from 1906 through 1908. He graduated from the Philadelphia College of Osteopathy (now the Philadelphia College of Osteopathic Medicine) in 1911 and began the practice of osteopathic medicine in Philadelphia the same year. He was member of the faculty of the Philadelphia College of Osteopathy from 1912 through 1933.

He was elected as a Democrat to the 75th Congress in 1936, but was an unsuccessful candidate for reelection in 1938. After his term in congress, he served as a member of the board of trustees of the Philadelphia College of Osteopathy.

He is buried at Whitemarsh Memorial Park in Prospectville, Pennsylvania.

== Sources ==
- United States Congress. "Ira W. Drew (id: D000494)". Biographical Directory of the United States Congress.
- The Political Graveyard

U.S. House of Representatives
Preceded by George P. Darrow	Member of the U.S. House of Representatives from Pennsylvania's 7th congressional district 1937–1939	Succeeded by George P. Darrow
