= George P. Darrow =

American politician

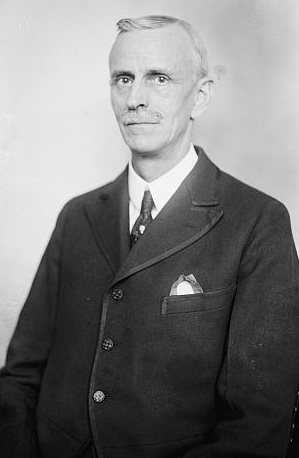

Member of the U.S. House of Representatives from Pennsylvania
- In office January 3, 1939 – January 3, 1941
- Preceded by: Ira W. Drew
- Succeeded by: Hugh Scott
- Constituency: 7th district
- In office March 4, 1915 – January 3, 1937
- Preceded by: James Washington Logue
- Succeeded by: Ira W. Drew
- Constituency: 6th district (1915–1923); 7th district (1923–1937)

Personal details
- Born: February 4, 1859 Waterford, Connecticut
- Died: June 7, 1943 (aged 84) Philadelphia, Pennsylvania
- Resting place: Ivy Hill Cemetery, Philadelphia, Pennsylvania
- Party: Republican
- Education: Alfred University

George Potter Darrow (February 4, 1859 – June 7, 1943) was a Republican member of the U.S. House of Representatives from Pennsylvania.

George Darrow was born in Waterford, Connecticut. He graduated from Alfred University in Alfred, New York, in 1880. He moved to Philadelphia, Pennsylvania, in 1888 and engaged in banking, in the manufacture of paints, and in the insurance business. He was president of the Twenty-second Sectional School Board of Philadelphia 1906–09, and a member of the Philadelphia Common Council 1910–15.

Darrow was elected to Congress as a Republican in 1914 to the 64th Congress and served until he was succeeded January 3, 1937. He had been an unsuccessful candidate for reelection in 1936. He was elected to the 67th Congress and served from January 3, 1939 to January 3, 1941. He was not a candidate for renomination in 1940.

Darrow died in Philadelphia, Pennsylvania, and is buried there at Ivy Hill Cemetery.

U.S. House of Representatives
Preceded by J. Washington Logue	Member of the U.S. House of Representatives from Pennsylvania's 6th congressional district 1915–1923	Succeeded by George A. Welsh
Preceded by Thomas S. Butler	Member of the U.S. House of Representatives from Pennsylvania's 7th congressional district 1923–1937	Succeeded by Ira W. Drew
Preceded by Ira W. Drew	Member of the U.S. House of Representatives from Pennsylvania's 7th congressional district 1939–1941	Succeeded by Hugh Scott
Honorary titles
Preceded by Walter M. Pierce	Oldest member of the U.S. House of Representatives; 1939–1941	Succeeded by Walter M. Pierce
