= Alan Wood Jr. =

American politician (1834–1902)

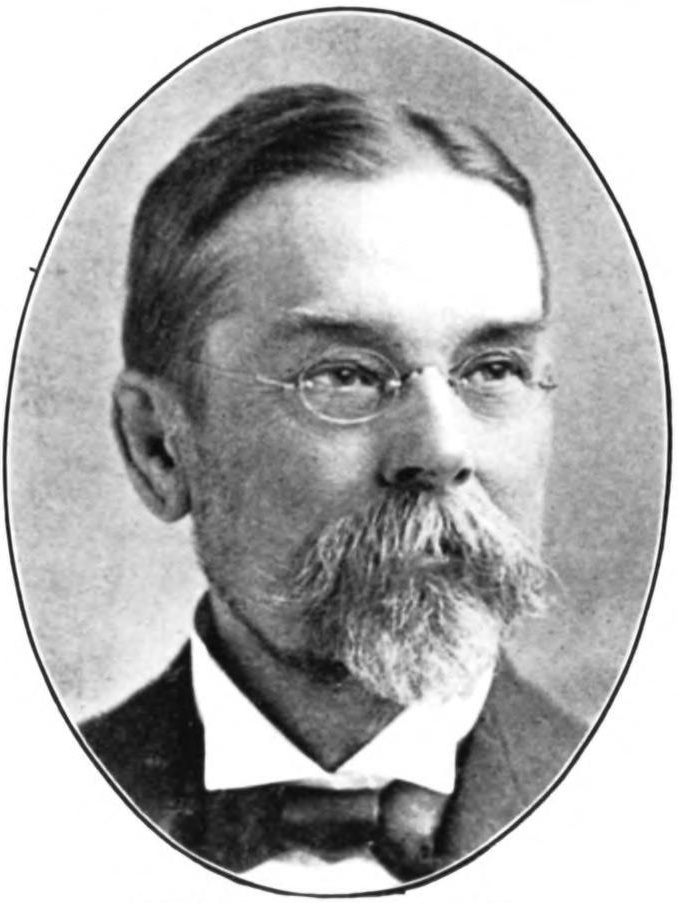
From 1902's Philadelphia and Notable Philadelphians

Alan Wood Jr. (July 6, 1834 – October 31, 1902) was a steel magnate and a Republican member of the U.S. House of Representatives from Pennsylvania.

The nephew of John Wood, who also served in Congress, Alan Wood Jr. was born in Philadelphia, Pennsylvania. He attended private schools and was employed in his father's mill at the Delaware Iron Works, near Wilmington, Delaware. He moved to Conshohocken, Pennsylvania, in 1857, and was engaged in iron manufacturing and banking.

Wood was elected as a Republican to the Forty-fourth Congress in 1874, and served from March 4, 1875 to March 3, 1877. He was not a candidate for renomination in 1876. He resumed his former business activities and also engaged in agricultural pursuits; he served as president of the Alan Wood Iron & Steel Co. In the 1890's he built the mansion known as Woodmont on a bluff overlooking Conshohocken and his steel works.

He died in 1902 in Philadelphia. He is interred in The Woodlands Cemetery.

== See also ==
- Woodmont

== Sources ==
- United States Congress. "Alan Wood Jr. (id: W000688)". Biographical Directory of the United States Congress.
- The Political Graveyard

U.S. House of Representatives
Preceded by Washington Townsend	Member of the U.S. House of Representatives from Pennsylvania's 7th congressional district 1875–1877	Succeeded by Isaac Newton Evans
