= Woodmont (Gladwyne, Pennsylvania) =

Historic house in Pennsylvania, United States

- U.S. National Register of Historic Places
- U.S. National Historic Landmark
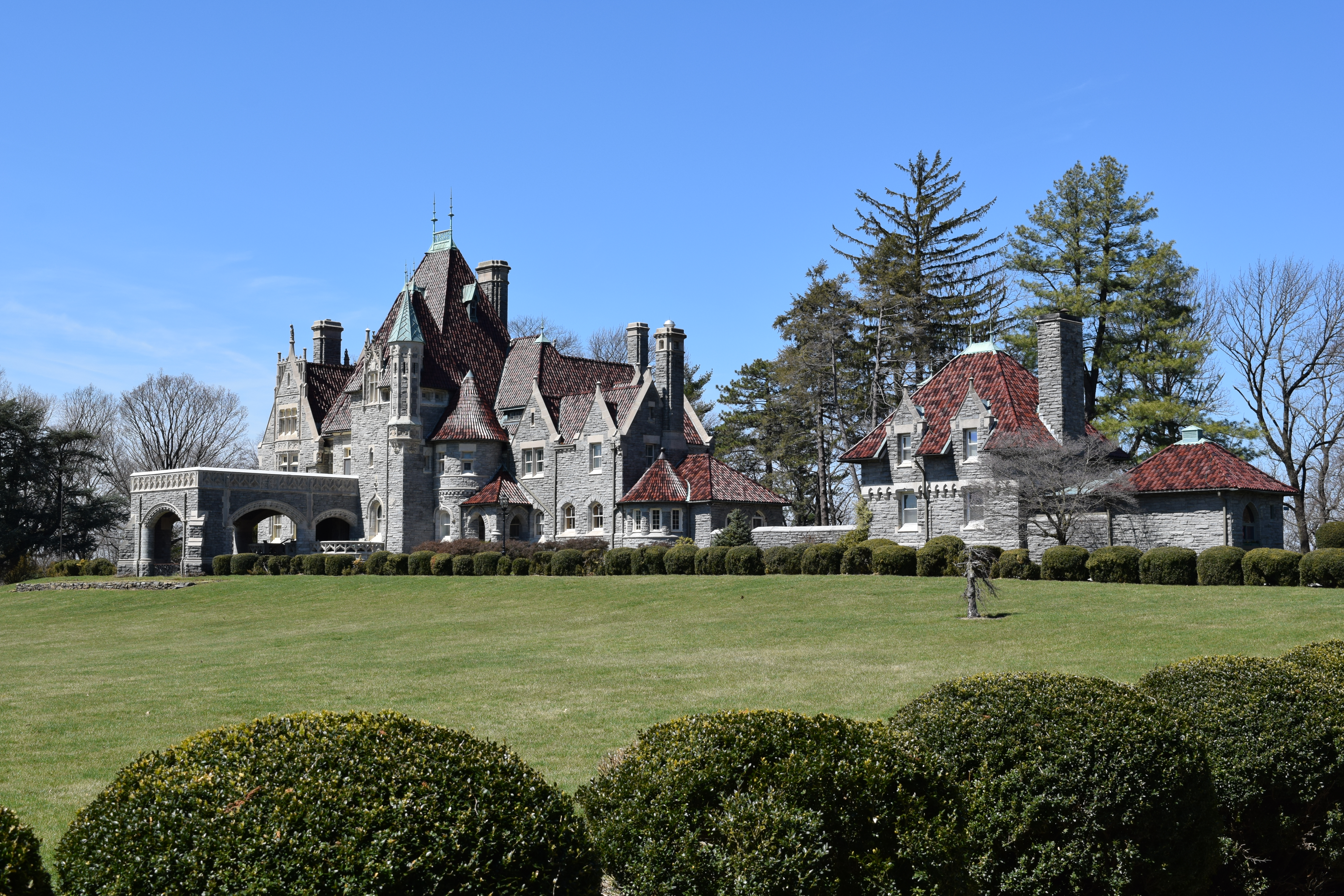
- Woodmont in 2017

- Location within Pennsylvania Location within the United States
- Location: 1622 Spring Mill Rd., Gladwyne, Pennsylvania
- Coordinates: 40°4′3″N 75°17′39″W
- Area: 72 acres (290,000 m^{2})
- Built: 1891-94
- Architect: William Lightfoot Price
- Architectural style: Châteauesque
- NRHP reference No.: 98001192

Significant dates
- Added to NRHP: August 5, 1998
- Designated NHL: August 6, 1998

Woodmont is a mansion and hilltop estate of 72 acres (29 ha) in Gladwyne, Pennsylvania. It was declared a National Historic Landmark in 1998 for its well-preserved Chateau-style architecture.

== Alan Wood, Jr. ==
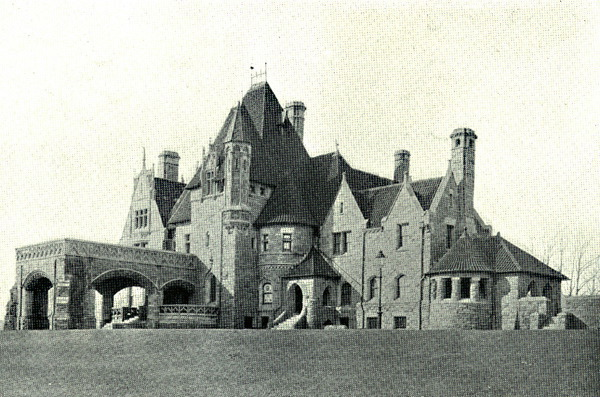
Woodmont in 1902.

Woodmont was designed in 1891 by Quaker architect William Lightfoot Price in the French Gothic style for Alan Wood, Jr., a steel magnate and former U.S. Congressman. Overlooking the Schuylkill River, the industrial town of Conshohocken, Pennsylvania, and the Alan Wood Iron & Steel Company plant, the chateauesque mansion was completed in 1894 at a cost of one million dollars ($37.8 million in 2023).

The site features views of 15 to 20 miles. The Schuylkill Expressway passes by the estate, hundreds of feet below.

The model for Woodmont was the George W. Vanderbilt mansion, Biltmore, in Asheville, North Carolina. Price had designed a nearby hotel for Vanderbilt, the Kenilworth Inn (1890–91), and was intimately familiar with the then-under-construction chateau.

Woodmont includes tennis courts, a swimming pool, stables, several outbuildings, greenhouses, a stream, and walking paths. The original property spanned more than 400 acres (1,600,000 m^{2}), including a working farm with two dairy barns (one survives).

Alan Wood, Jr. occupied the estate for less than a decade. A year before his 1902 death, he sold it to his nephew, Richard G. Wood, who lived there for 28 years. Richard began subdividing the land in 1929, including the sale of 200 acres (810,000 m^{2}) to the Philadelphia Country Club.

External videos
- An American Castle - Woodmont the Alan Wood Jr. estate, by Wanda Kaluza

A description from 1897:

WOODMONT.--Alan Wood, Jr., owns the estate with the above name. The section around the house, including the gardens, is styled Woodmont Park. The house was constructed between 1891 and 1894. William L. Price, of Philadelphia, being the architect. The style is that of a French Gothic chateau. Stone from the vicinity furnished most of the walls, the cellar being cut out of the rock. Lieperville stone, with limestone trimmings, were used in facing, and the stable is from the stone quarried from the cellar. The site is 475 feet above tidewater, overlooking the Valley of the Schuylkill for fifteen or twenty miles around. The highest site in Montgomery County is on the Woodmont Farm, being twenty-five feet higher than the mansion site. There are neat lodge-houses. Woodmont Farm contains about 100 acres, and Bellevue and Highland Farms, owned by Mr. Wood, adjoining, also contain about a hundred acres each. The Woodmont Farm had been owned by the Newberry family for a century before Mr. Wood purchased it in 1880. The Bellevue and Highland Farms were a part of the John Y. Crawford estate, and were bought from the estate by Mr. Wood in 1885. Highland Farm was well-named in old time from its elevated position. The farms are well-kept, and in the best condition. On Highland Farm was a stone mansion house, which Mr. Wood beautifully remodeled, and it has been rented to citizens yearly, furnished. Richard G. Wood, of Pittsburg [sic], is dwelling there this summer. There is also a fine farm-house. The stone barn on Bellevue Farm is believed to be the finest one in Montgomery County, accommodating fifty cows and twenty-five horses; and hospital stalls are added for sick cows and horses for isolation.

== Father Divine ==
The estate is the center of the International Peace Mission movement. Father Divine, a self-proclaimed God and leader of the movement, was given the estate by a follower, John Devoute, in 1953. His followers renovated the mansion and placed an American flag prominently in front reflecting Father Divine's patriotism. They also added a garden like those on previous Peace Mission properties. An open house was held on September 10–12, 1953.

Followers visited Father Divine here until his death in 1965. All furnishings in Divine's rooms, including an antiquated television set, have been left as they were at his death. The estate is a shrine to his life and a meeting place for his few remaining followers.

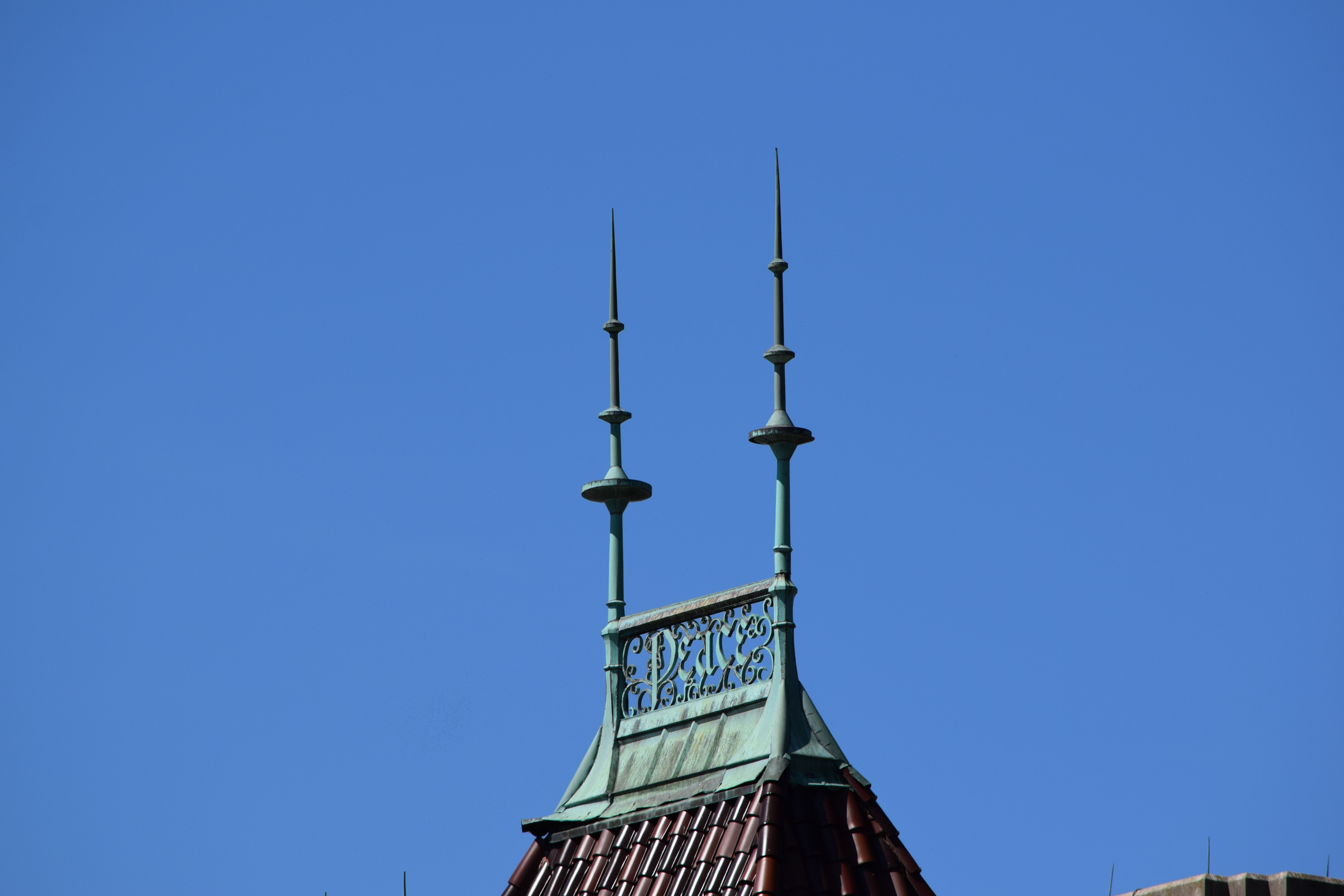
"Peace" Metalwork on a Spire

== Visiting ==
Woodmont is open to the public on Sunday afternoons, from April to October. The guided tours are free of charge.

== See also ==
- List of National Historic Landmarks in Pennsylvania
- National Register of Historic Places listings in Montgomery County, Pennsylvania
