= Henry Wilson (Pennsylvania politician) =

American politician

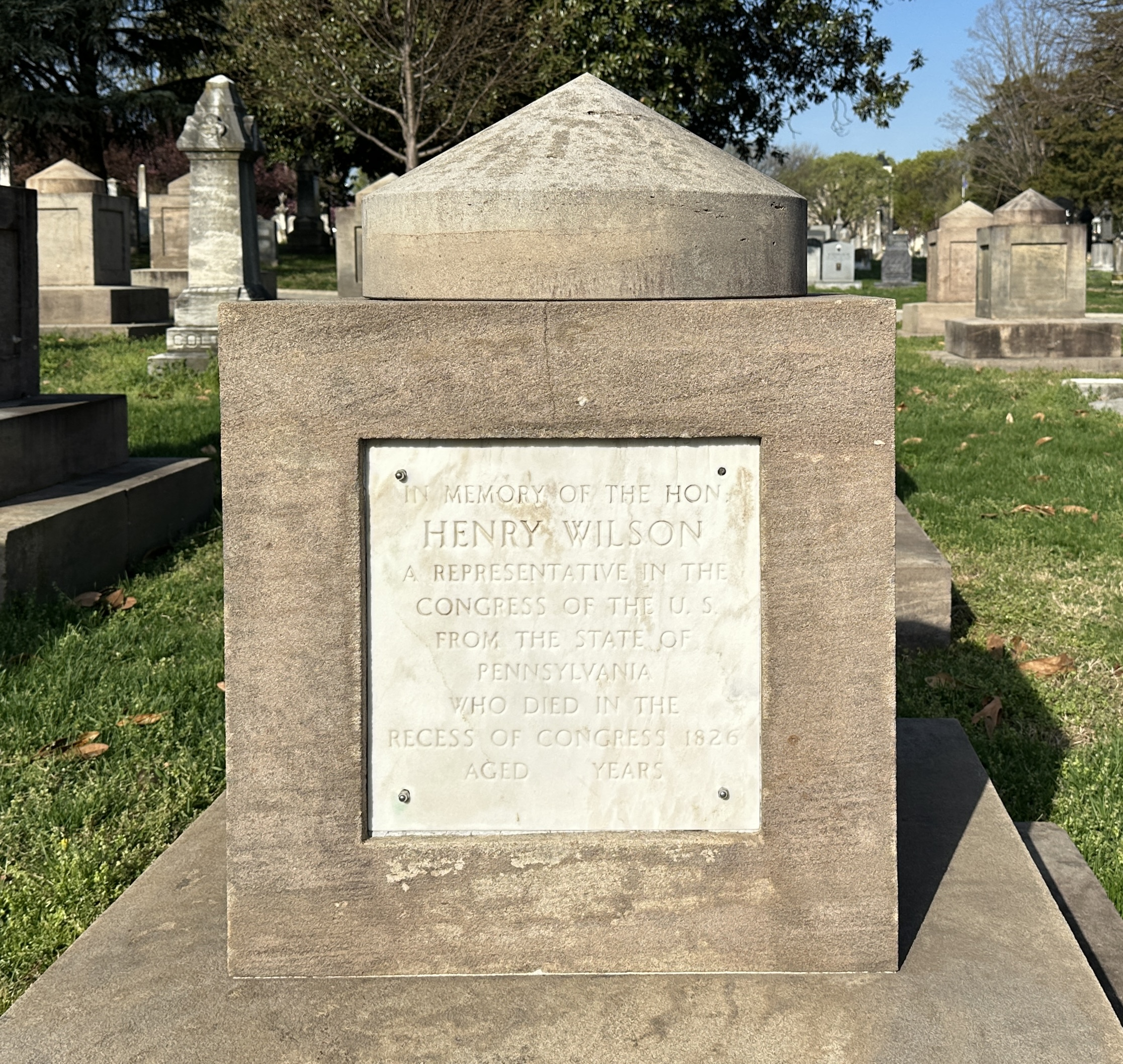
- Wilson's cenotaph at Congressional Cemetery

Member of the U.S. House of Representatives from Pennsylvania's 7th district
- In office March 4, 1823 – August 14, 1826
- Preceded by: Daniel Udree
- Succeeded by: William Addams, Jacob Krebs

Personal details
- Born: 1778 Dauphin, Pennsylvania
- Died: August 14, 1826 (aged 47–48) Allentown, Pennsylvania
- Resting place: Union Cemetery

Henry Wilson (1778 – August 14, 1826) was an American lawyer and politician who served two terms as a member of the U.S. House of Representatives from Pennsylvania from 1823 until his death in 1826.

== Biography ==
Henry Wilson was born in Dauphin, Pennsylvania. He completed preparatory studies, studied law in Harrisburg, Pennsylvania, was admitted to the bar December 21, 1812, and commenced practice in Allentown, Pennsylvania. He served as prothonotary and clerk of Lehigh County Courts from 1815 to 1821.

=== Congress ===
Wilson was elected to the Eighteenth and Nineteenth Congresses and served until his death in Allentown in 1826.

=== Death and burial ===
After his death on August 14, 1826, his body was interred in Union Cemetery.

== See also ==
- List of members of the United States Congress who died in office (1790–1899)

== Sources ==
- United States Congress. "Henry Wilson (id: W000584)". Biographical Directory of the United States Congress.
- The Political Graveyard

U.S. House of Representatives
Preceded by Daniel Udree	Member of the U.S. House of Representatives from Pennsylvania's 7th congressional district 1823–1826; 1823–1825 alongside: Daniel Udree 1825–1826 alongside: William Addams	Succeeded by William Addams; Jacob Krebs
