= Father Divine =

American cult leader (c. 1876 – 1965)

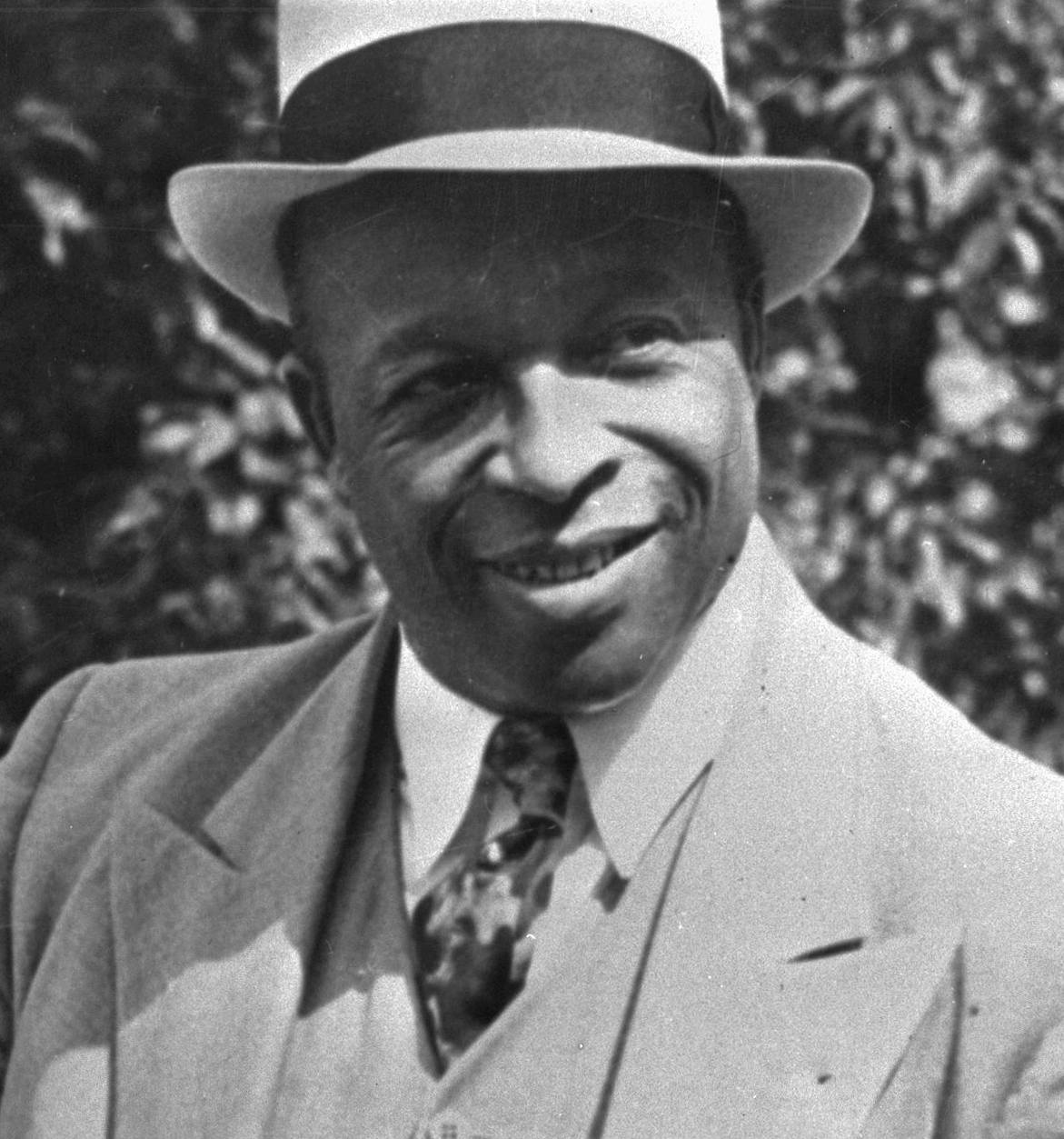
- Father Divine in 1938
- Born: c. 1876; Hutchinson Island, Georgia or Rockville, Maryland, U.S.
- Died: September 10, 1965 (aged 89); Philadelphia, Pennsylvania, U.S.
- Occupation: Preacher
- Spouse(s): 1st: Penninah Divine; 2nd: Edna Rose Ritchings

Father Divine (c. 1876 – September 10, 1965), also known as Reverend M. J. Divine, was an American spiritual leader from about 1907 until his death in 1965. His full self-given name was Reverend Major Jealous Divine, and he was also known as "the Messenger" early in his life. He founded the International Peace Mission movement, formed its doctrine and oversaw its growth from a small and predominantly black congregation into a multiracial and international church. He also engaged in anti-lynching activism. His organization had a few tens of thousands of adherents and was the largest property owner in Harlem at one time. Many consider him to be a cult leader, since he claimed to be God.

== Life and career ==
=== Prior to 1912: Early life and original name ===
Little is known about Father Divine's early life, or even his real given name. Father Divine and the peace movement he started did not keep many records. Father Divine declined several offers to write his biography, saying that "the history of God would not be useful in mortal terms". He also refused to acknowledge his relationship with any family. Newspapers in the 1930s had to dig up his probable given name: George Baker. This name is not recognized by the Library of Congress, and from 1979, there is no further use of that name as a heading for Father Divine in libraries' catalogs.

Federal Bureau of Investigation files record his name as George Baker, alias "God". In 1936 Eliza Mayfield claimed to be Father Divine's mother. She stated that his real name was Frederick Edwards from Hendersonville, North Carolina, and he had abandoned a wife and five children, but Mayfield offered no proof and claimed not to remember his father's name. Father Divine replied that "God has no mother."

Father Divine's childhood remains a contentious point. Some, especially earlier researchers, suppose that he was born in the Deep South, most likely in Georgia, as the son of sharecroppers. Newer research by Jill Watts, based on census data, finds evidence for a George Baker Jr. of appropriate age born in an African-American enclave of Rockville, Maryland, called Monkey Run. If this theory is correct, his mother was a former slave named Nancy Baker, who died in May 1897.

Most researchers agree that Father Divine's parents were freed black slaves. Recordkeeping about this generation of African Americans was notoriously poor, so controversy about his upbringing is not likely to be resolved. On the other hand, he and his first wife, Peninniah (variant spellings: Penninah, Peninnah, Penniah) claimed that they were married on June 6, 1882. This date appears to have a spiritual meaning rather than a literal one.

Father Divine was probably called George Baker around the turn of the century. He worked as a gardener in Baltimore, Maryland. In a 1906 trip to California, Father Divine became acquainted with the ideas of Charles Fillmore and the New Thought movement, a philosophy of positive thinking that would inform his later doctrines. Among other things, this belief system asserted that negative thoughts led to poverty and unhappiness. Songwriter Johnny Mercer credited a Father Divine sermon for inspiring the title of his song "Ac-Cent-Tchu-Ate the Positive".

Father Divine attended a local Baptist Church, often preaching, until 1907, when a traveling preacher named Samuel Morris spoke and was expelled from the congregation. Morris, originally from Allegheny County, Pennsylvania, had a soft-spoken and uncontroversial sermon until the end, when he raised his arms and shouted "I am the Eternal Father!" This routine had him thrown out of many churches in Baltimore, and was apparently unsuccessful until Morris happened upon the receptive Father Divine.

In his late 20s, Father Divine became Morris's first follower and adopted a pseudonym, "The Messenger". The Messenger was a Christ figure to Morris's God the Father. Father Divine preached with Morris in Baltimore out of the home of former evangelist Harriette Snowden, who came to accept their divinity. Morris began calling himself "Father Jehovia".

Divine and Father Jehovia were later joined by John A. Hickerson, who called himself Reverend Bishop Saint John the Vine. John the Vine shared the Messenger's excellent speaking ability and his interest in New Thought.

In 1912, the three-man ministry collapsed, as John the Vine denied Father Jehovia's monopoly on godhood, citing 1 John 4:15 to mean God was in everyone:

Whoever shall confess that Jesus is the Son of God, God dwells in him and he in God.

Father Divine parted ways with his former associates. Denying that Father Jehovia was God, and saying that not everyone could be God, he declared that he himself was God, and the only true expression of God's spirit.

=== 1912–1914: In the South ===
Father Divine traveled south, where he preached extensively in Georgia. In 1913, conflicts with local ministers led to him being sentenced to 60 days in a chain gang. While he was serving his sentence, several prison inspectors were injured in an auto accident, which he viewed as the direct result of their disbelief.

Upon his release, he attracted a following of mostly black women in Valdosta, Georgia. He taught celibacy and the rejection of gender categorizations.

On February 6, 1914, several followers' husbands and local preachers had Divine arrested for lunacy. This arrest expanded his ministry, with reporters and worshipers deluging his prison cell. Some whites even began calling on him.

Former Mercer University professor and lay preacher, J.R. Moseley of Macon, Georgia befriended Divine and arranged for J.B. Copeland, a Mercer alum and respected Valdosta lawyer, to represent him pro bono. Moseley was interested in what he termed "this unusual man" in his autobiography Manifest Victory.

Decades later, in the 1930s, Moseley met Divine in New York City when he received word that the man going by that name might in fact be the same person he met in Georgia. Father Divine was found mentally sound in spite of "maniacal" beliefs. He had given no name when arrested and was tried as "John Doe (alias God)".

=== 1914–1919: Brooklyn and marriage to Peninniah ===
In 1914, Father Divine travelled to Brooklyn, New York, with a small number of followers and an all-black congregation. Although he claimed to be God incarnate fulfilling biblical prophecies, he lived relatively quietly.

He and his disciples formed a commune in a black, middle-class apartment building. He forbade sex, alcohol, tobacco and gambling among the people living with him. By 1919, he had adopted the name Reverend Major Jealous Divine. "Reverend Major" was chosen as a title of respect and authority, while "Jealous" was a reference to Exodus 34:14, where the Lord says he is a "jealous god" and that God's name is Jealous. His followers affectionately called him Father Divine.

In this period, Father Divine was married to Peninniah (biblical name and the name of Peninnah, first wife of Elkanah the father of the prophet Samuel with variant spellings: Penninah, Peninnah, Penniah), a follower, who was many years older than himself. Like Father Divine, her early life is obscure, but she is believed to be from Macon, Georgia. Harris, who wrote a biography about the Peace movement and its leader said that Father Divine had met Peninah in Georgia and came North with her and that they bought the house in Sayville as a married couple. Penniniah would later claim that Father Divine had healed her from crippling arthritis or rheumatism and after this she became one of his early followers. She would also witness in churches and in the street about her miraculous recovery. According to this account Penniniah was a member of a Methodist church in Valdosta led by Rev. Joseph Gabriel, who had allowed Father Divine to preach in his church after witnessing one of his alleged miracles.

But in an interview with a reporter from the New York Post, Penniniah told a reporter that she had met Father Divine in Baltimore, Maryland, when he was a 'Nazarene' or Holiness preacher. The actual marriage date is unknown but probably occurred between 1914 and 1917. She was first called "Sister Penny" then "Mother Penny" and finally referred to as "Mother Divine" or "Mother of the Faithful".

In addition to lending her dignified look to Father Divine, Peninniah served to defuse rumours of impropriety between him and his many young female followers. Both Penninah and Father Divine would assert that the marriage was never physically consummated.

Peninniah became known for her free dinners, the forerunners of the later lavish "Holy Communion" banquets that helped to attract new followers to the movement. She also played a major part in the Peace Mission's development throughout the 1920s and 1930s, establishing the group's "Promised Land" in Ulster County in upstate New York, where she also attempted to open an orphanage (though the attempt was ultimately unsuccessful).

=== 1919–1931: Sayville, New York ===
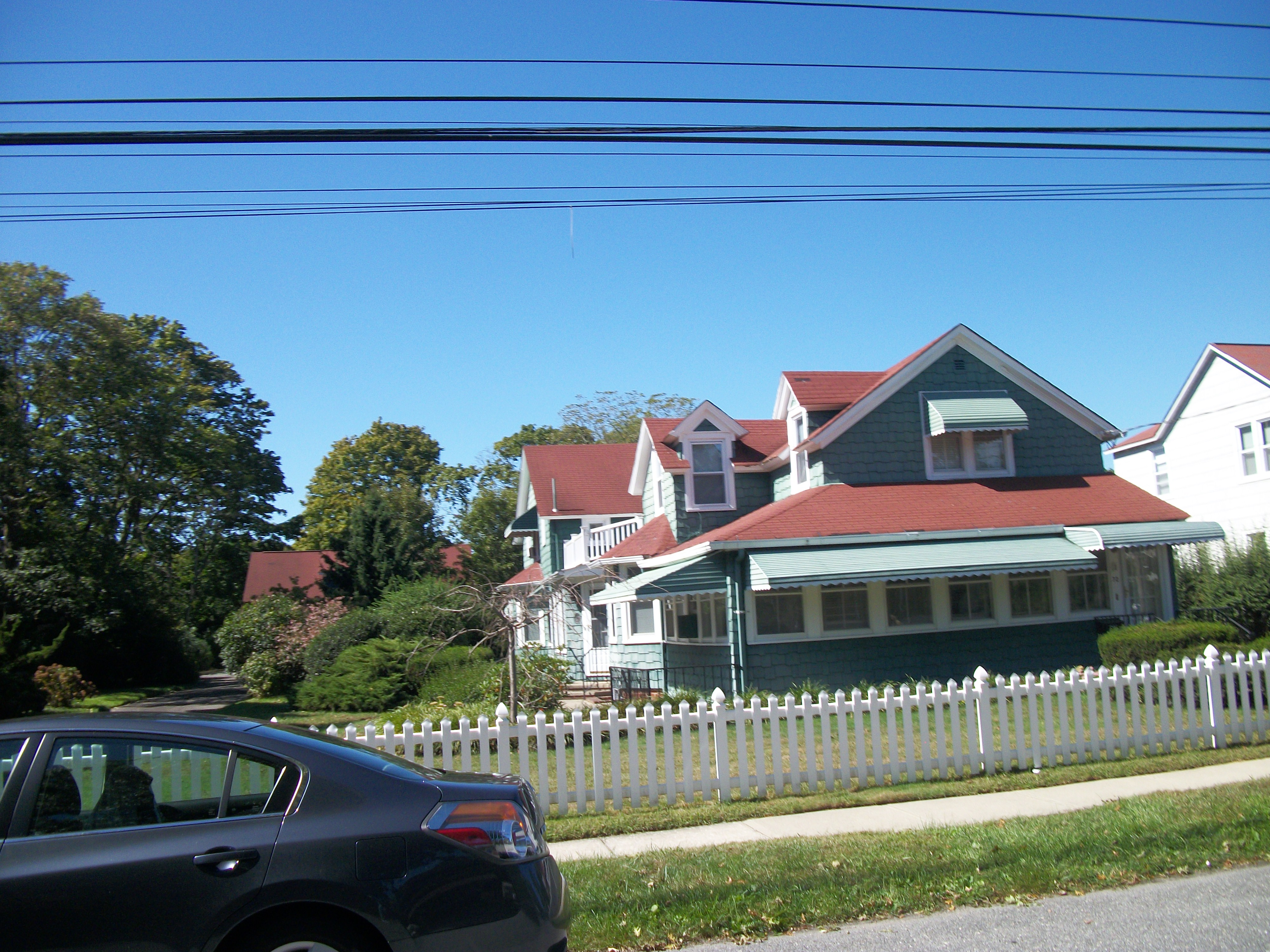
Father Divine's house in Sayville, New York.

Father Divine and his disciples moved to Sayville, Long Island, New York in 1919. He and his followers were the first black homeowners in town. Father Divine purchased his 72 Macon Avenue house from a resident who wanted to spite the neighbor he was feuding with. The two neighbors, both German Americans, began fighting when one of them changed his name from Felgenhauer to Fellows in response to anti-German sentiment. His neighbor taunted him, and the feud escalated until Fellows decided to move. As a final insult, he specifically advertised his home for sale to a "colored" buyer, presumably to lower his neighbors' property value.

In this period, his movement underwent sustained growth. Father Divine held free weekly banquets and helped newcomers find jobs. He began attracting many white followers as well as black. The integrated environment of Father Divine's communal house and the apparent flaunting of his wealth by his owning a Cadillac infuriated neighbors.

Members of the overwhelmingly white community accused him of maintaining a large harem and engaging in scandalous sex, but the district attorney's office in Suffolk County found the claims baseless. To try to please his neighbors, he had a sign posted at his driveway warning guests: NOTICE—Smoking—Intoxicating Liquors—Profane Language—Strictly Prohibited. Contrary to the charges of Sayville residents, Angels claimed that Father Divine prohibited singing after 8 p.m., and by 10 p.m. had closed all windows and blinds." Nonetheless, the neighbors continued to complain.

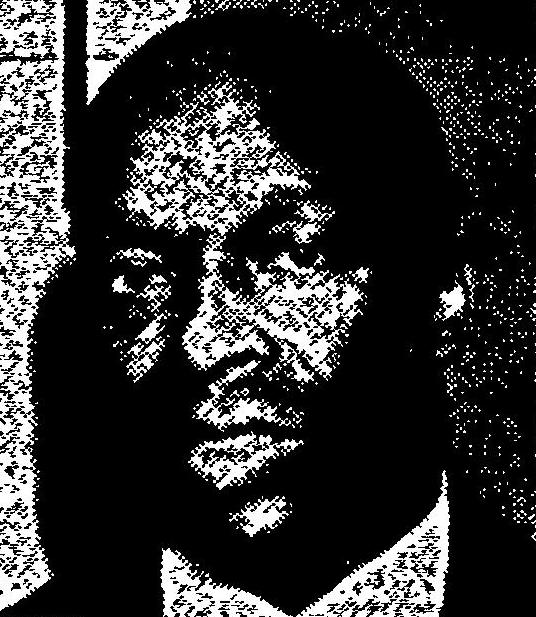
Photo of Father Divine from a FBI document

=== 1931–1932: Sayville arrests, trial, notoriety, and prison ===
On May 8, 1931, a Sayville deputy arrested and charged Father Divine with disturbing the peace. Remarkably, during the Depression, Father Divine submitted his $1,000 bail in cash. The trial, not as speedy as the neighbors wanted, was scheduled for late fall, allowing Father Divine's popularity to snowball for the entire Sayville vacation season.

Father Divine held banquets for as many as 3,000 people that summer. Cars clogging the streets for these gatherings bolstered some neighbors' claims that Father Divine was a disturbance to the peace and was hurting their property values.

On Sunday, November 15, at 12:15 am, a police officer was called to Father Divine's for raucous loudness at his property. By the time state troopers, deputies and prison buses were called in, a mob of neighbors had surrounded the compound. Fearing a riot, the police informed Father Divine and his followers that they had fifteen minutes to disperse. Father Divine had them wait in silence for ten minutes, and then they filed into police custody.

Processed by the county jail at 3 am, clerks were frustrated, because his followers often refused to give their usual names and stubbornly offered the "inspired" names they adopted in the movement. Seventy-eight people were arrested altogether, including fifteen whites. Forty-six pleaded guilty to disturbing the peace and incurred $5 fines, which Father Divine paid with a $500 bill, which the court was embarrassingly unable to make change from. Penninah, Father Divine, and 30 followers resisted the charges.

Father Divine's arrest and heterodox doctrines were sensationally reported. The New York frenzy made this event and its repercussions the single most famous moment of Father Divine's life. Although mostly inaccurate, articles on Father Divine propelled his popularity. By December, his followers began renting buildings in New York City for Father Divine to speak in. Soon, he often had several engagements on a single night. On December 20, he spoke to an estimated 10,000 in Harlem's Rockland Palace, a spacious former basketball venue, Manhattan Casino.

By May 1932, meetings were regularly held at the Rockland Palace and throughout New York and New Jersey. Father Divine had supporters in Washington, California and throughout the world thanks to New Thought devotees like Eugene Del Mar, an early convert and former Harlem journalist, and Henry Joerns, the publisher of New Thought Magazine in Seattle. Although the movement was predominantly black, followers outside the Northeastern United States were mostly middle-class whites.

In this period of expansions, several branch communes were opened in New York and New Jersey. Father Divine's followers finally named the movement the International Peace Mission movement.

Father Divine's trial was held on May 24, 1932. His lawyer, Ellee J. Lovelace, a prominent Harlem African American and former US attorney had requested the trial be moved outside of Suffolk County due to potential jury bias. The court acquiesced, and the trial took place at the Nassau County Supreme Court before Judge Lewis J. Smith. After a long trial, with many witnesses, "Smith instructed the jury to ignore the statements made by witnesses not present on the night of the raid. Smith's order invalidated most of the testimony in Father Divine's favor and severely crippled the defense."

The jury found him guilty on June 5th but asked for leniency on behalf of Father Divine. Ignoring the jury's request, Smith lectured on how Father Divine was a fraud and "menace to society" before issuing the maximum sentence for disturbing the peace: one year in prison and a $500 fine.

Smith, 55, died of a heart attack days later on June 9, 1932. Father Divine was widely reported to have commented on the death, "I hated to do it." He wrote to his followers, "I did not desire Judge Smith to die. ... I did desire that MY spirit would touch his heart and change his mind that he might repent and believe and be saved from the grave."

The impression that Judge Smith's death was divine retribution was perpetuated by the press, which failed to report Smith's prior heart problems and implied the death to be more sudden and unexpected than it was.

During his brief prison stay, Father Divine read prodigiously, notably on the Scottsboro Nine. After his attorneys secured release through an appeal on June 25, 1932, he declared that the foundational documents of the United States of America, such as the United States Constitution and Declaration of Independence, were inspired. Father Divine also taught that contemporary leaders strayed from these ideals, but he would become increasingly patriotic through his life.

=== 1932–1942: Harlem ===
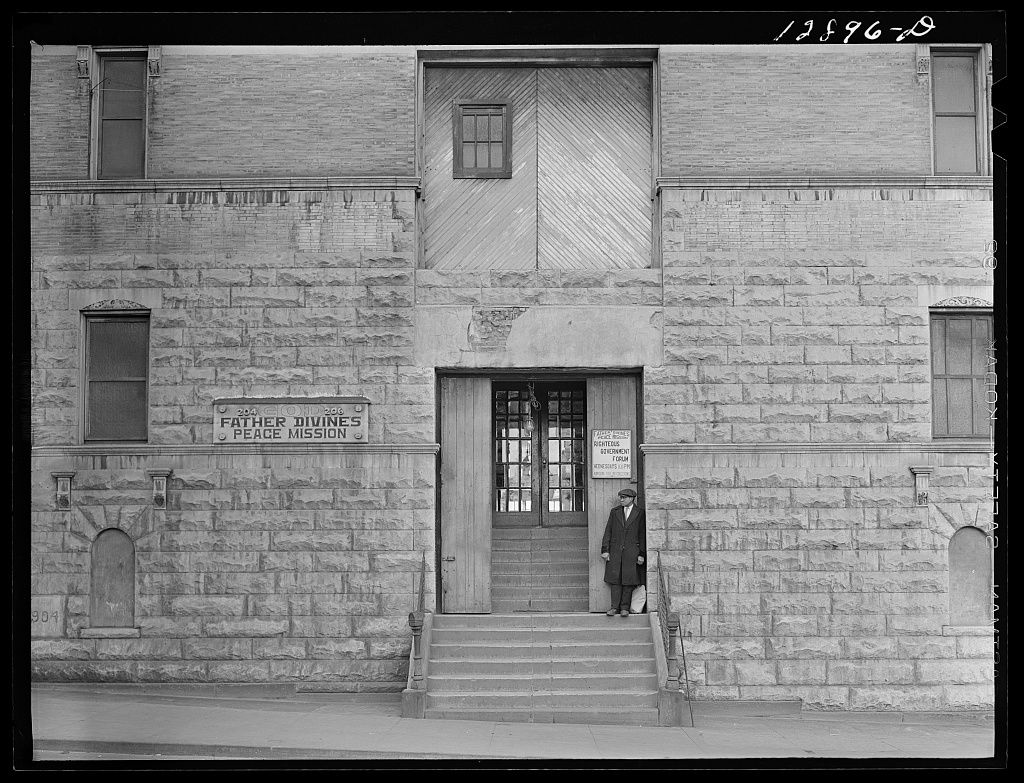
The International Peace Mission movement established over 100 Heavens in the Northeastern United States.

Father Divine moved to the Harlem neighborhood of New York City, where he had accumulated a significant following in the black community. Members, rather than Father Divine himself, held most real estate property deeds for the movement, but they contributed toward Father Divine's comfortable lifestyle. Purchasing several hotels, which they called "Heavens", members could live and seek jobs inexpensively. He opened one hotel "near Atlantic City, New Jersey, so that blacks could access the beach."

Father Divine and the Peace Mission, became the largest property owners in Harlem at one point in time. The movement also opened several budget enterprises, including restaurants and clothing shops, that sold cheaply by cutting overhead expenses. These proved very successful in the depression. Economical, cash-only businesses were part of Father Divine's doctrine.

By 1934, branches had opened in Los Angeles and Seattle, and gatherings occurred in France, Switzerland, Canada, and Australia, but the membership totals were drastically overstated in the press. Time magazine estimated nearly 2 million followers, but the true figure of adherents was probably a few tens of thousands and a larger body of sympathizers who attended his gatherings.

Nonetheless, Father Divine was increasingly called upon to offer political endorsements, which he initially did give. For example, New York City mayoral candidates John P. O'Brien and Fiorello H. LaGuardia each sought his endorsement in 1933, but Father Divine was apparently uninterested.

An odd alliance between Father Divine and the Communist Party of America began in early 1934. Although Father Divine was an outspoken capitalist, he was impressed with the party's commitment to civil rights. The party relished the endorsement, but contemporary FBI records indicate some critics of the perceived huckster were expelled from the party for protesting the alliance.

In spite of this alliance, the movement was largely apolitical until the Harlem Riot of 1935. Based on a rumor of police killing a black teenager, it left four dead and caused over $1 million in property damage in Father Divine's neighborhood. Father Divine's outrage at this and other racial injustices fueled a keener interest in politics. In January 1939, the movement organized the first-ever "Divine Righteous Government Convention", which crafted political platforms incorporating the Doctrine of Father Divine. Among other things, the delegates opposed school segregation and many of Franklin Delano Roosevelt's social programs, which they interpreted as "handouts".

Later in May 1937, an ex-follower called Verinda Brown filed a lawsuit for $4,476 ($100,244 in 2025) against Father Divine. The Browns had entrusted their savings with Father Divine in Sayville back in 1931. They left the movement in 1935, wishing to live as husband and wife again, but were unable to get their money back. In light of their evidence and testimony from Faithful Mary and others critical of the movement, the court ordered repayment of the money. However, this opened up an enormous potential liability from all ex-devotees, so Father Divine resisted and appealed the judgment.

Father Divine's political focus on anti-lynching measures became more resolved. By 1940, his followers had gathered 250,000 signatures in favor of an anti-lynching bill he wrote. However, passage of such statutes came slowly in New York and elsewhere.

The Verinda Brown lawsuit against Father Divine dragged on and was sustained on appeal. In July 1942, he was ordered to pay Brown or face contempt of court. Instead, Father Divine fled the state and re-established his headquarters in Philadelphia, Pennsylvania. He still visited New York, however. State law forbade serving subpoenas in New York on Sunday, so he often spoke on the Sabbath day in Harlem, the Promised Land (his commune in Kingston, New York), and Sayville, New York.

=== 1942–1965: Pennsylvania ===
After moving to Philadelphia, Father Divine's wife Penninah died. The exact date is not known, because Father Divine never talked about it or even acknowledged her death. However, it occurred sometime in 1943, as her last known appearance was at a banquet in New York in 1942 and biographers believe Penninah's death rattled Father Divine, making him aware of his own mortality. It became obvious to Father Divine and his followers that his doctrine might not make one immortal as he asserted, at least not in the flesh.

In 1944, singer/songwriter Johnny Mercer came to hear of one of Divine's sermons. The subject was "You got to accentuate the positive and eliminate the negative". Mercer said, "Wow, that's a colorful phrase!" On his return to Hollywood, he got together with songwriter Harold Arlen ("Over the Rainbow"), and together they wrote "Ac-Cent-Tchu-Ate the Positive", which was recorded by Mercer and the Pied Pipers in 1945. It was recorded by Bing Crosby with the Andrews Sisters that same year.

After his first wife died, Father Divine married a white Canadian woman named Edna Rose Ritchings in Washington, D.C. on April 29, 1946. The ceremony was kept secret even from most members until Ritching's visa expired. Critics of the movement believed that Father Divine's seemingly scandalous marriage to 21-year-old Ritchings would destroy the movement. Instead, most followers rejoiced, and the marriage date became a celebrated anniversary in the movement. To prove that he and Ritchings adhered to his doctrine on sexual abstinence, Father Divine assigned a black female follower to be her constant companion.

He claimed that Ritchings, later called "Mother S. A. Divine", was the reincarnation of Penninah. Reincarnation was not previously part of Father Divine's doctrine and did not become a fixture of his theology. Followers believed that Penninah was an exceptional case and viewed her "return" as a miracle.

In 1949, in Latham v. Father Divine, the New York Court of Appeals found Father Divine liable, since he, through false representations, undue influence, physical force and murder, prevented Mary Sheldon Lyon from executing a new will.

Going into the 1950s, the press rarely covered Father Divine, and when it did, it was no longer as a menace, but as an amusing relic. For example, light-hearted stories ran when Father Divine announced Philadelphia was capital of the world and when he claimed to inspire invention of the hydrogen bomb. Father Divine's predominantly lower-class following ebbed as the economy swelled.

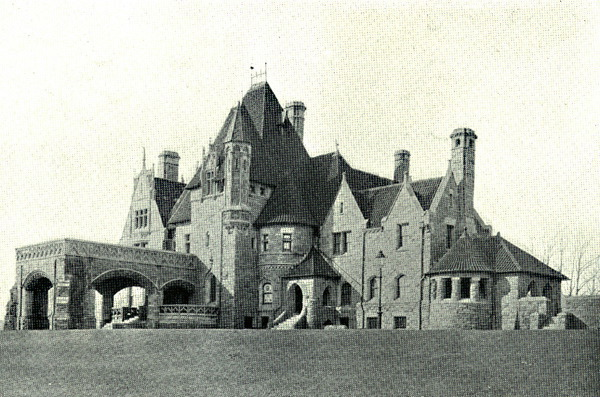
Woodmont was Father Divine's home from 1953 until his death in 1965.

In 1953, follower John Devoute gave Father Divine Woodmont, a 72-acre (0.3 km^{2}) hilltop estate in Gladwyne, Pennsylvania. This French Gothic Revival manor served as his home and primary site of his increasingly infrequent banquets until his death in 1965.

As his health declined, he continued to petition for civil rights. In 1951, he advocated reparations to be paid to the descendants of slaves. He also argued in favor of integrated neighborhoods. However, he did not participate in the burgeoning American civil rights movement because of his poor health and especially his dislike of the use of racial labels, denying he was black.

On September 10, 1965, Father Divine died of natural causes at his Woodmont estate. His widow and remaining followers insist his spirit is still alive and always refer to Father Divine in the present tense. Believers keep the furnishings of Father Divine's personal rooms at Woodmont just as they were as a shrine to his life.

Father Divine's widow Edna Rose Ritchings became the spiritual leader of the movement. In 1972, she fought an attempt by Jim Jones to take over the movement's dwindling devotees. Jones based some of his doctrines on the International Peace Mission movement and claimed to be the reincarnation of Father Divine. Although a few members of the Mission joined the Peoples Temple after Jones made his play for leadership of the movement, the power push was, in terms of its ultimate objective, a failure.

That Jones was 34 years old at the time of Father Divine's death made his claims of being a new incarnation rather hard to sustain – Jones claimed Divine's spirit had entered his body upon the passing of the elder man – and Ritchings was left unimpressed by Jones' impassioned rhetoric. Jones' custom of tape-recording all his sermons was copied from Divine, who "spoke" to his followers via archived sermon tapes once ill health forced him to cease speaking at meetings.

== Physical characteristics and preaching style ==
Father Divine was a black man at a diminutive 5 ft 2 in (1.57 m). Through most of his life, he maintained a groomed style and since his days in Sayville, New York, he almost always wore a suit in public.

Divine was said to be very charismatic. His sermons were emotionally moving and freely associated between topics. His speech was often peppered with words of his own invention like "physicalating" and "tangiblated". An attendee at a Harlem "kingdoms" meeting in the 1930s recalled that he rhythmically intoned "Tens, hundreds, thousands, ten thousands, hundred thousands, millions. Tens, hundreds, ... millions." Although this seemed nonsense to the visitor, he reported that at the end the true believers chanted, "Yes, he's God. Yes he's God."

Father Divine ended every sermon or article with the following statement, "Sincerely wishing that you and those with whom you are concerned might be even as I AM for I AM well, healthy, joyful, peaceful, lively, loving, successful, prosperous and happy in spirit, body and mind and in every organ, muscle, sinew, joint, limb, vein and bone and even in every atom, fibre and cell of MY bodily form."

Other eccentricities were drawn from his doctrine. For example, nearly every sermon began with the greeting and exhortation "Peace!" Father Divine believed that peace should replace hello.

== Doctrine ==
Father Divine preached of his divinity even before he was known as "Father Divine" in the late 1910s. His doctrine taught that his life fulfilled all biblical prophecies about the second coming, regarding himself as Jesus Christ reborn. Father Divine also lectured that Christ existed in "every joint" of his follower's bodies, and that he was "God's light" incarnated in order to show people how to establish heaven on earth and to show them the way to eternal life. For example:

Condescendingly I came as an existing Spirit unembodied, until condescendingly inputting MYSELF in a Bodily form in the likeness of men I came, that I might speak to them in their own language, coming to a country that is supposed to be the Country of the Free, where mankind is privileged to serve GOD according to the dictates of his own conscience [...] establishing the Kingdom of GOD in the midst of them; that they might become to be living epistles as individuals, seen and read of men, and verifying what has long been said:

"The tabernacle of God is with men, and he shall dwell with them, and God Himself shall be with them, and he shall be their God, and they shall be his people."

— Peace Mission Movement p. 62, Mrs. S. A. Divine, 1985 and Watts

Father Divine and his followers capitalized pronouns referring to him, much like "LORD" translated from the tetragrammaton is capitalized in the English Bible.

Father Divine was particularly concerned with the downtrodden of society, including but not limited to African Americans. He was opposed to people accepting welfare. He believed in capitalism, and "In his opinion, capitalism was not at fault; the individual was to blame for the depression." He thought Americans could make it better if they had positive thoughts and channeled God's spirit.

== Legacy ==
=== Civil rights ===
Some biographers, such as Robert Weisbrot, speculate that Father Divine was a forerunner to the civil rights movement during the 1950s and 1960s, heavily influenced by his upbringing in the segregated South. Others, such as Jill Watts, reject not only this characterization, but also the theory that Father Divine grew up in the Deep South. Watts asserts that Rockville was less oppressive than the South or even Baltimore, Maryland, and believes his civil rights positions are unintelligible without evaluating them in the context of the Doctrine of Father Divine.

=== Religious ===
Edna Rose Ritchings (Mother Divine) conducted services for the old and dwindling congregation until her death. The movement owns several properties, such as Father Divine's Gladwyne estate Woodmont, his former home in Sayville, New York, and the Circle Mission Church on Broad Street in Philadelphia, which also houses the movement's library.

In 2004, Gastronomica published an article about Mother S.A. Divine and the movement's feasts.

In 2000, the Divine Lorraine Hotel near Temple University on North Broad Street was sold by the international Peace Mission movement. It was a budget hotel with separate floors for men and women in accord with Father Divine's teachings. The Divine Tracy Hotel in West Philadelphia was sold in 2006.

== See also ==
- List of people who have been considered deities
- God complex
- List of people from Harlem
