= Daniel Udree =

American politician

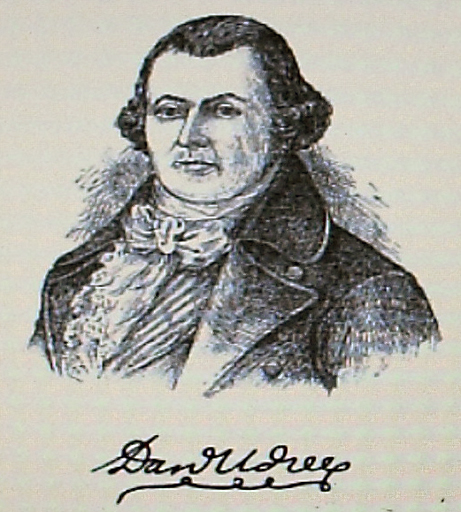

Member of the U.S. House of Representatives from Pennsylvania's 7th district
- In office October 12, 1813 – March 3, 1815
- Preceded by: John M. Hyneman
- Succeeded by: Joseph Hiester
- In office December 26, 1820 – March 3, 1821
- Preceded by: Joseph Hiester
- Succeeded by: Ludwig Worman
- In office December 10, 1822 – March 3, 1825
- Preceded by: Ludwig Worman
- Succeeded by: Henry Wilson; William Addams

Member of the Pennsylvania State Senate
- In office 1808–1812

Member of the Pennsylvania House of Representatives
- In office 1799-1805

Personal details
- Born: August 5, 1751 Philadelphia, Pennsylvania
- Died: July 15, 1828 (aged 76) Reading, Pennsylvania
- Party: Democratic-Republican Party

Daniel Udree (August 5, 1751 – July 15, 1828) was a Democratic-Republican member of the United States House of Representatives from Pennsylvania.

== Biography ==
Born on August 5, 1751, in Philadelphia, Pennsylvania, Udree was raised in comfortable surroundings by his prosperous uncle, Jacob Winey, and was educated in the public schools of his community. As a young adult, he relocated to Berks County, Pennsylvania, where he became an iron merchant.

Udree served in the American Revolution as a colonel. A participant in the Battle of Brandywine, his horse was shot from underneath him. He subsequently served as a major general in the War of 1812.

He was elected to the 13th Congress to fill the vacancy caused by the resignation of John M. Hyneman, and served from October 12, 1813, to March 3, 1815. He was unsuccessful in his reelection bid in 1814.

He was then elected to the 16th Congress to fill the vacancy caused by the resignation of Joseph Hiester, and served from December 26, 1820, to March 3, 1821. In 1822, he won election to the 18th Congress, which would begin on March 4, 1823.

After the death of Representative Ludwig Worman on October 17, 1822, he won the special election for the seat for the remainder of the 17th Congress and was seated on December 10, 1822, serving until March 3, 1825.

After his legislative career ended, he returned to work as a merchant.

== Death and interment ==
He died in Reading, Pennsylvania, on July 15, 1828, and was interred at the Oley Cemetery in Oley, Pennsylvania.

U.S. House of Representatives
Preceded by John M. Hyneman	Member of the U.S. House of Representatives from Pennsylvania's 7th congressional district 1813–1815	Succeeded by Joseph Hiester
Preceded by Joseph Hiester	Member of the U.S. House of Representatives from Pennsylvania's 7th congressional district 1820–1821	Succeeded by Ludwig Worman
Preceded by Ludwig Worman	Member of the U.S. House of Representatives from Pennsylvania's 7th congressional district 1822–1825; 1823–1825 alongside: Henry Wilson	Succeeded by Henry Wilson; William Addams
