= Jacob Krebs =

American politician

Member of the U.S. House of Representatives from Pennsylvania's 7th district
- In office December 4, 1826 – March 3, 1827
- Preceded by: William Addams; Henry Wilson
- Succeeded by: William Addams; Joseph Fry, Jr.

Personal details
- Born: March 13, 1782 Longswamp Township, Pennsylvania, U.S.
- Died: September 26, 1847 (aged 65) Orwigsburg, Pennsylvania, U.S.
- Party: Jacksonian

Jacob Krebs (March 13, 1782 – September 26, 1847) was an American politician who served as a Jacksonian member of the U.S. House of Representatives for Pennsylvania's 7th congressional district from 1826 to 1827.

== Early life ==
Krebs was born on March 13, 1782, in Longswamp Township, Pennsylvania to Michael and Catherine Kunz Krebs.

== Career ==
As a young man, Krebs relocated from Longswamp Township to Schuylkill Haven, Pennsylvania, where he purchased a large tract of land, part of which became the county farm known today as Rest Haven. He devoted his time to developing this property "and became very wealthy for a man of his time. He stood as one of the most prominent and widely known and influential men of his time," according to an 1893 century book on the history of Schuylkill County, Pennsylvania. He married Elizabeth Bayer/Boyer.

=== Politics ===
As a politician, Krebs served as a Republican member of the Pennsylvania House of Representatives from 1812 to 1814.

As a Jacksonian Democrat, he subsequently was elected as a U.S. Representative to the 19th U.S. Congress, filling the vacancy caused by the death of Henry Wilson. He served in this capacity from December 4, 1826, to March 3, 1827 and did not run for reelection.

From 1828 to 1836, he served as a Democrat in the Pennsylvania Senate, where he represented the Pennsylvania's 6th district. He was elected Register of Wills, Clerk of Courts and Recorder for Schuylkill County, which was a combined office at the time, serving from 1840 to 1842. After each term of his various public offices ended, he consistently returned to his previous occupation in agriculture.

== Death ==
Krebs died in Orwigsburg, Pennsylvania on September 26, 1847, at age 65, and was interred at St. Paul's Evangelical Lutheran Cemetery in Orwigsburg.

U.S. House of Representatives
Preceded by William Addams; Henry Wilson	Member of the U.S. House of Representatives from Pennsylvania's 7th congressional district 1826–1827 alongside: William Addams	Succeeded by William Addams; Joseph Fry, Jr.
Pennsylvania State Senate
Preceded by Daniel A. Bertolet	Member of the Pennsylvania Senate, 6th district 1829-1835	Succeeded by Paul Geiger
