= 1822–23 United States House of Representatives elections =

House elections for the 18th U.S. Congress

- July 1, 1822 – August 14, 1823

All 213 seats in the United States House of Representatives 107 seats needed for a majority
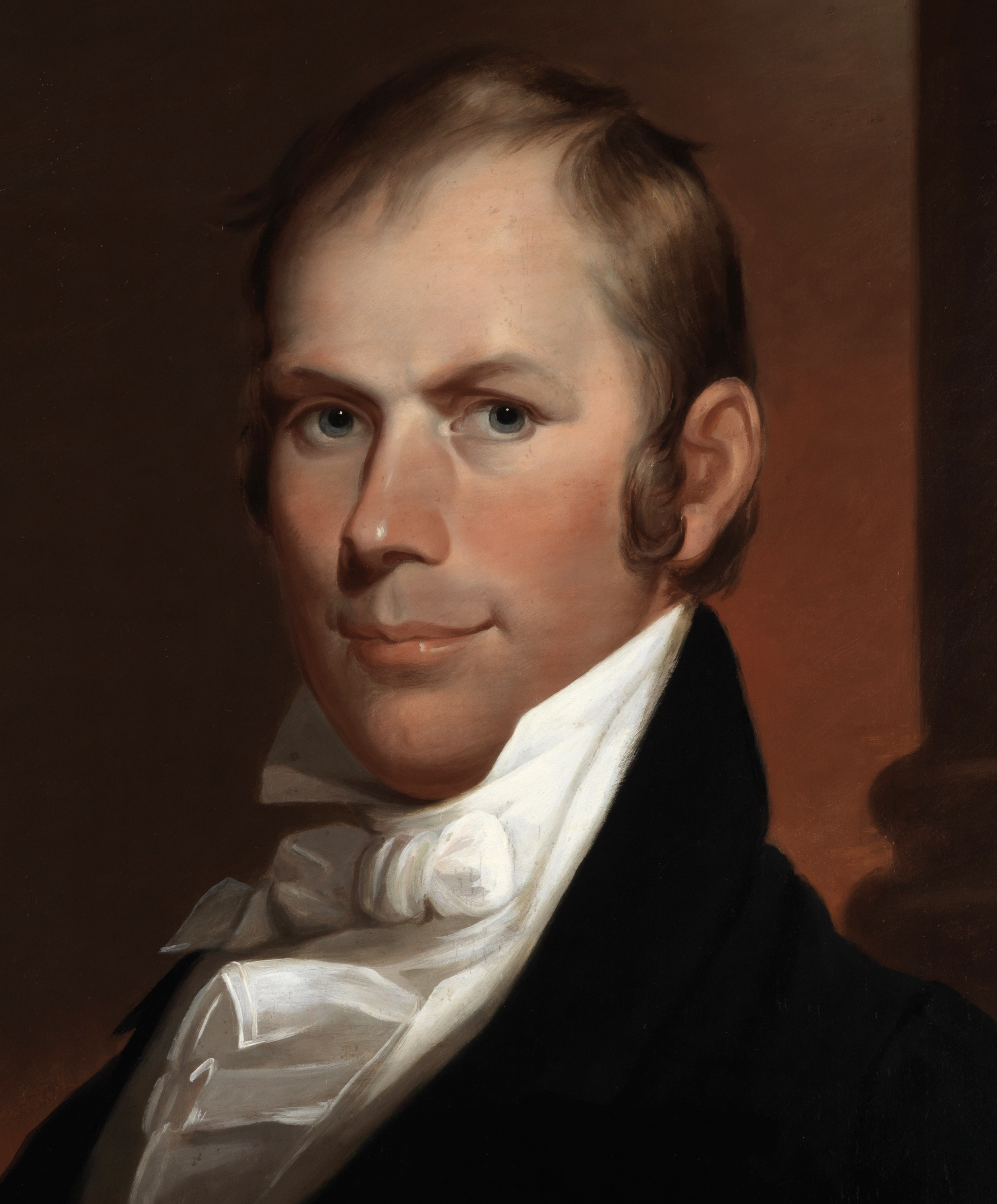

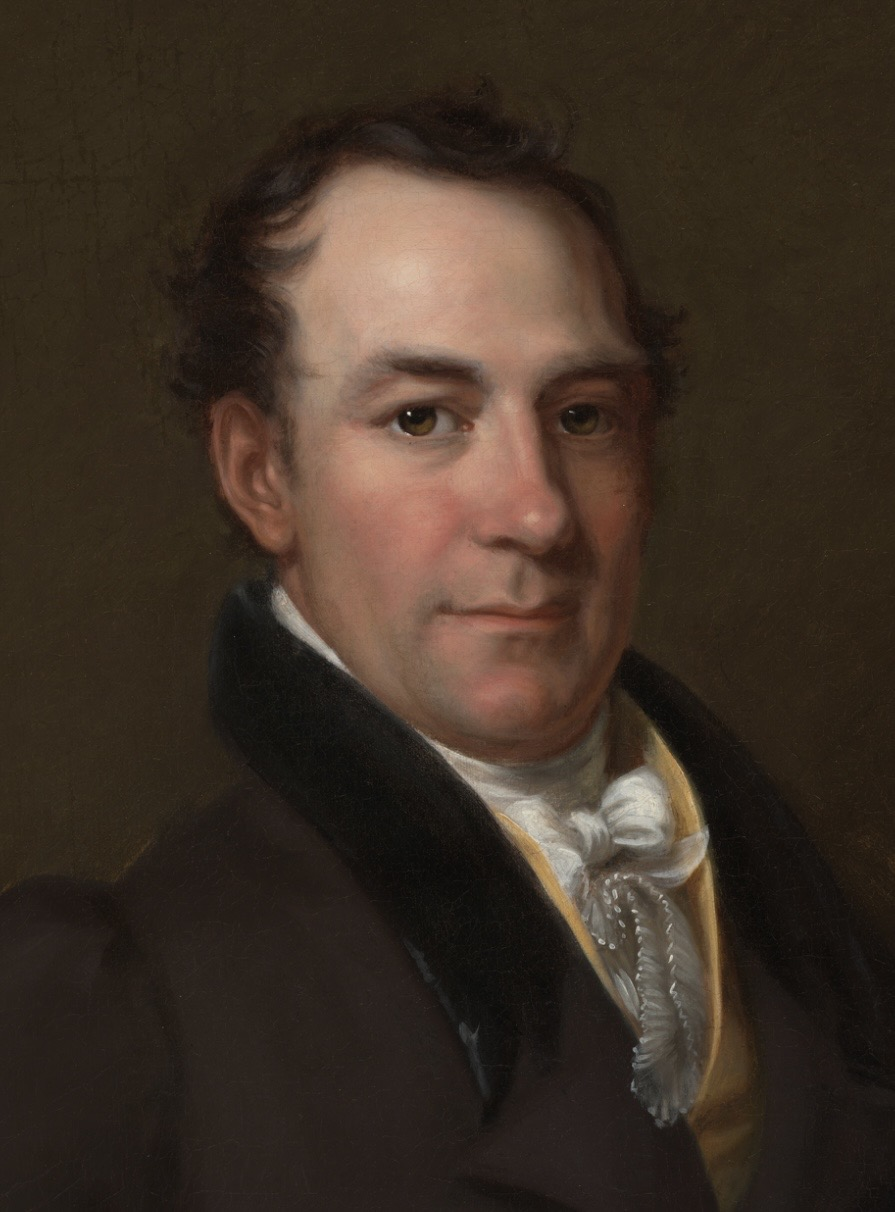
	Majority party	Minority party
Leader	Henry Clay	Louis McLane
Party	Democratic-Republican	Federalist
Leader's seat	Kentucky 3rd	Delaware at-large
Last election	155 seats	32 seats
Seats won	189 (Note: Corresponds to the sum of Adams-Clay Republicans (72), Jackson Republicans (64), and Crawford Republicans (53), if the 1824 votes for President are used to categorize.)	24 (Note: Corresponds to the sum of Adams-Clay Federalists (15), Jackson Federalists (7), and Crawford Federalists (2), if the 1824 votes for President are used to categorize.)
Seat change	▲34	▼8
- Results: Democratic-Republican hold Democratic-Republican gain Federalist hold Federalist gain Undistricted territory or split plural districts
Speaker before election
Philip P. Barbour
Democratic-Republican
Elected Speaker
Henry Clay
Democratic-Republican

The 1822–23 United States House of Representatives elections were held on various dates in various states between July 1, 1822, and August 14, 1823. Each state set its own date for its elections to the House of Representatives before the first session of the 18th United States Congress convened on December 1, 1823. They occurred during President James Monroe's second term.

Following the congressional reapportionment based on the 1820 United States census, the House increased by 26 seats to a total of 213. Most relative population growth was in the West. This was the last House election during the virtually nonpartisan Era of Good Feelings and the largest midterm gain of seats by a President's party. The Democratic-Republican Party remained nationally dominant, and the Federalist Party was limited to state and local influence.

This election heralded key change not apparent until the end of the 18th Congress. The four-way 1824 presidential election, in which all candidates ran as Democratic-Republicans, would result in no candidate winning an Electoral College majority. Representatives elected to the 18th Congress are often classified by how they voted in the 1825 contingent election, which after a controversial, unanticipated political deal chose John Quincy Adams President, triggering a new, rancorous, abruptly realigned period of partisanship.

This election marked the second time in American history where the incumbent president's party gained House seats in a midterm election while still losing seats in the Senate, this happened before in 1814 and again in 1902.

== Election summaries ==
↓
189	24
Democratic-Republican	Federalist

Following the 1820 census, 26 new seats were apportioned, with 4 States losing 1 seat each, 9 States gaining between 1 and 8 seats, and the remaining 11 States having no change in apportionment.

State	Type	↑ Date	Total seats		Democratic-Republican				Federalist						
State	Type	↑ Date	Seats	Change				Factions: Adams-Clay (AC), Crawford (C) and Jackson (J)							
State	Type	↑ Date	Seats	Change				AC	C	J	Change	AC	C	J	Change
Louisiana	Districts	July 1–3, 1822	3	▲2	2	0	1	▲2	0			Steady			
Illinois	At-large	August 5, 1822	1	Steady	1	0	0	Steady	0			Steady			
Indiana	Districts	August 5, 1822	3	▲2	0	0	3	▲2	0			Steady			
Kentucky	Districts	August 5, 1822	12	▲2	8	0	4	▲2	0			Steady			
Mississippi	At-large	August 5–6, 1822	1	Steady	0	0	1	Steady	0			Steady			
New Hampshire	At-large	August 26, 1822 (Note: Run-off election held for one seat on May 11, 1823.)	6	Steady	6	0	0	Steady	0			Steady			
Rhode Island	At-large	August 27, 1822	2	Steady	2	0	0	Steady	0			Steady			
Vermont	At-large	September 3, 1822	5	▼1	5	0	0	▼1	0			Steady			
Delaware	At-large	October 1, 1822	1	▼1	0			▼1	0	1	0	Steady			
Georgia	At-large	October 7, 1822	7	▲1	0	7	0	▲1	0			Steady			
Maryland	Districts	October 7, 1822	9	Steady	3	1	2	Steady	2	0	1	Steady			
Missouri	At-large	October 7, 1822	1	Steady	1	0	0	Steady	0			Steady			
Ohio	Districts	October 8, 1822	14	▲8	10	2	2	▲8	0			Steady			
Pennsylvania	Districts	October 8, 1822	26	▲3	0	0	20	▲5	1	0	5	▼2			
New Jersey	At-large	October 15, 1822	6	Steady	1	0	5	Steady	0			Steady			
Massachusetts	Districts	November 4, 1822 (Note: Majority required for election, which was not met in 3 districts, necessitating additional elections on March 3 and May 12, 1823.)	13	Steady	6	0	0	Steady	6	0	1	Steady			
New York	Districts	November 4–6, 1822	34	▲7	14	14	2	▲11	4	0	0	▼4			
South Carolina	Districts	February 12–13, 1823	9	Steady	0	0	9	Steady	0			Steady			
Late elections (after the March 4, 1823, beginning of the term)
Virginia	Districts	April 1823	22	▼1	1	19	1	Steady	0	1	0	▼1			
Connecticut	At-large	April 7, 1823	6	▼1	6	0	0	▼1	0			Steady			
Maine	Districts	April 7, 1823 (Note: Majority required for election which was not met in 4 districts necessitating additional elections held on June 30, September 9, and November 3.)	7	Steady	6	0	0	▲1	1	0	0	▼1			
Alabama	Districts	August 3, 1823	3	▲2	0	0	3	▲2	0			Steady			
Tennessee	Districts	August 7–8, 1823	9	▲3	0	0	9	▲3	0			Steady			
North Carolina	Districts	August 14, 1823	13	Steady	0	10	2	Steady	1	0	0	Steady			
Total			213	▲26	72	64	53	▲34	15	2	7	▼8			
Total			213	▲26	88.7%			▲34	11.3%			▼8			

House seats (at election)
Dem-Republican	88.73%
Federalist	11.27%

House seats (at contingent election)
Adams-Clay	40.85%
Jackson	33.33%
Crawford	25.82%

== Special elections ==
There were special elections in 1822 and 1823 to the 17th United States Congress and 18th United States Congress.

Special elections are sorted by date then district.

=== 17th Congress ===
District	Incumbent			This race	
District	Member	Party	First elected	Results	Candidates
New York 9	Solomon Van Rensselaer	Federalist	1818	Incumbent resigned January 14, 1822. New member elected February 25–27, 1822 and seated March 12, 1822. Federalist hold. Winner later elected to the next term in the 10th district; see below.	▌ ✓ Stephen Van Rensselaer (Federalist) 80.7%; ▌Solomon Southwick (Democratic-Republican) (Note: "Bucktail" faction) 17.8%
Delaware at-large	Caesar A. Rodney	Democratic- Republican	1802; 1804 (lost); 1820	Incumbent resigned January 24, 1822, when elected U.S. Senator. New member elected October 1, 1822 and seated December 2, 1822. Federalist gain. Winner retired when the seat was eliminated.	▌ ✓ Daniel Rodney (Federalist) 51.5%; ▌James Derickson (Democratic-Republican) 48.4%
Pennsylvania 1	William Milnor	Federalist	1806; 1810 (lost); 1814; 1816 (lost); 1820	Incumbent resigned May 8, 1822. New member elected October 1, 1822 and seated December 2, 1822. Federalist hold. Winner later lost re-election in the 3rd district; see below.	▌ ✓ Thomas Forrest (Federalist) 50.0% (Note: Thomas Forrest, in 1822 Pennsylvania's 1st congressional district special election, won by a single vote, 5,977 to 5,976.); ▌Daniel H. Miller (Democratic-Republican) 50.0%
Pennsylvania 6	Samuel Moore	Democratic- Republican	1818 (special)	Incumbent resigned May 20, 1822. New member elected October 1, 1822 and seated December 2, 1822. Democratic-Republican hold. Winner later re-elected in the 8th district; see below.	▌ ✓ Samuel D. Ingham (Democratic-Republican) 60.5%; ▌Samuel Sitgreaves (Federalist) 39.5%
Pennsylvania 14	Henry Baldwin	Democratic- Republican	1816	Incumbent resigned May 8, 1822, because of his declining health and failing finances. New member elected October 1, 1822 and seated December 2, 1822. Democratic-Republican hold. Winner later re-elected in the 16th district; see below.	▌ ✓ Walter Forward (Democratic-Republican) 58.2%; ▌Ephraim Pentland (Independent) 41.8%
Virginia 2	Thomas Van Swearingen	Federalist	1819	Incumbent died August 19, 1822. New member elected October 28, 1822 and seated December 2, 1822. Federalist hold. Winner later re-elected in the 18th district; see below.	▌ ✓ James Stephenson (Federalist); [data missing]
Maine 2	Ezekiel Whitman	Federalist	1808 (Mass.); 1810 (lost); 1816 (Mass.); 1820 (Maine)	Incumbent resigned June 1, 1822. New member elected between June and December 1822 and seated December 2, 1822. Democratic-Republican gain. Winner was not a candidate to the next term; see below.	▌ ✓ Mark Harris (Democratic-Republican) 55.5%; ▌George Bradbury (Federalist) 41.8%; ▌Woodbury Storer (Democratic-Republican) 2.7%
Indiana at-large	William Hendricks	Democratic- Republican	1816	Incumbent resigned July 25, 1822, to run for Governor of Indiana. New member elected between July and December 1822 and seated December 2, 1822. Democratic-Republican hold. Winner also elected to the next term in the 2nd district; see below.	▌ ✓ Jonathan Jennings (Democratic-Republican) 69.3%; ▌Davis Floyd (Democratic-Republican) 30.6%
South Carolina 4	James Overstreet	Democratic- Republican	1818	Incumbent died May 24, 1822. Successor also elected to the next term. New member elected in October 1822 and seated December 4, 1822. Democratic-Republican hold. Winner later re-elected; see below.	▌ ✓ Andrew R. Govan (Democratic-Republican); Uncontested
Pennsylvania 7	Ludwig Worman	Federalist	1820	Incumbent died October 17, 1822. New member elected December 10, 1822 and seated December 23, 1822. Democratic-Republican gain. Winner had already been elected to the next term; see below.	▌ ✓ Daniel Udree (Democratic-Republican) 51.8%; ▌William Witman (Ind. Democratic-Republican) 48.2%
South Carolina 9	James Blair	Democratic- Republican	1821 (special)	Incumbent resigned May 8, 1822. New member elected December 11, 1822 and seated December 11, 1822. Democratic-Republican hold. Winner later re-elected in the 8th district; see below.	▌ ✓ John Carter (Democratic-Republican) 36.4%; ▌James G. Spann (Unknown) 35.8%; ▌John Waties (Unknown) 27.8%
South Carolina 2	William Lowndes	Democratic- Republican	1812	Incumbent died October 27, 1822. New member elected December 13, 1822 and seated January 6, 1823. Democratic-Republican hold. Winner later re-elected; see below.	▌ ✓ James Hamilton Jr. (Democratic-Republican) 56.7%; ▌Richard B. Screvan (Unknown) 29.8%; ▌William Elliott (Unknown) 13.4%
Maryland 5	Samuel Smith	Democratic- Republican	1792; 1816	Incumbent re-elected (see below) but resigned December 22, 1822. New member elected January 1, 1823 and seated January 8, 1823. Democratic-Republican hold. Winner also elected to the next term; see below.	▌ ✓ Isaac McKim (Jackson D-R) 37.7%; ▌William H. Winder (Unknown) 36.6% (Note: Source does not give party affiliation.); ▌John Barney (Democratic-Republican) 25.7%

=== 18th Congress ===
District	Incumbent			This race	
District	Member	Party	First elected	Results	Candidates
Maryland 5	Samuel Smith	Democratic- Republican	1792; 1816	Incumbent re-elected (see below) but resigned December 22, 1822. New member elected January 1, 1823 and seated with the rest of the House on December 1, 1823. Democratic-Republican hold. Winner also elected to finish the term; see above.	▌ ✓ Isaac McKim (Jackson D-R) 37.7%; ▌William H. Winder (Unknown) 36.6%; ▌John Barney (Democratic-Republican) 25.8%
Massachusetts 10	William Eustis	Democratic- Republican	1800; 1804 (lost); 1820 (special)	Incumbent re-elected (see below) but declined the election. New member elected September 8, 1823. Democratic-Republican hold. Election was challenged and successor was not seated, leading to a new election.	▌ ✓ John Bailey (Adams-Clay D-R) 59.0%; ▌John Ames (Federalist) 33.6%; ▌Sher Leland (Democratic-Republican) 7.5%
New York 28	William B. Rochester	Adams; Democratic- Republican	1821	Incumbent resigned April 21, 1823, to become Judge of the New York's Eighth Circuit Court. New member elected in November 1823 and seated with the rest of the House on December 1, 1823. Democratic-Republican hold.	▌ ✓ William Woods (Adams-Clay D-R) 51.4%; ▌Daniel Cruger (Democratic-Republican) 48.6%

== Alabama ==
Alabama increased from one to three seats in reapportionment following the 1820 United States census. The state then changed from a single at-large district to three geographic districts. Alabama elected its members August 3, 1823, after the term began but before the new Congress convened.

District	Incumbent			This race	
District	Member	Party	First elected	Results	Candidates
Alabama 1 "Northern district"	Gabriel Moore; Redistricted from the at-large district	Democratic- Republican	1821	Incumbent re-elected.	▌ ✓ Gabriel Moore (Jackson D-R) 100%
Alabama 2 "Middle district"	None (new district)			New seat. Democratic-Republican gain.	▌ ✓ John McKee (Jackson D-R) 24.7%; ▌Thomas Farrar (Unknown) 21.6%; ▌Jesse W. Garth (Democratic-Republican) 19.6%; ▌Marmaduke Williams (Democratic-Republican) 19.1%; ▌Sion L. Perry (Unknown) 7.9%; ▌John S. Fulton (Unknown) 7.0%
Alabama 3 "Southern district"	None (new district)			New seat. Democratic-Republican gain.	▌ ✓ George W. Owen (Jackson D-R) 67.6%; ▌Arthur P. Bagby (Democratic-Republican) 23.7%; ▌Silas Dinsmoor (Unknown) 8.7%

== Arkansas Territory ==
See Non-voting delegates, below.

== Connecticut ==
Connecticut lost one seat in reapportionment following the 1820 United States census. Connecticut elected its members April 7, 1823, after the term began but before the new Congress convened.

District	Incumbent			This race	
District	Member	Party	First elected	Results	Candidates
Connecticut at-large 6 seats on a general ticket	Noyes Barber	Democratic-Republican	1821	Incumbent re-elected.	▌ ✓ Gideon Tomlinson (Adams-Clay D-R) 17.2%; ▌ ✓ Ebenezer Stoddard (Adams-Clay D-R) 16.6%; ▌ ✓ Ansel Sterling (Adams-Clay D-R) 16.1%; ▌ ✓ Lemuel Whitman (Adams-Clay D-R) 13.7%; ▌ ✓ Noyes Barber (Adams-Clay D-R) 13.5%; ▌ ✓ Samuel A. Foot (Adams-Clay D-R) 11.7%; ▌Henry W. Edwards (Democratic-Republican) 5.1%; ▌Daniel Burrows (Democratic-Republican) 3.7%; ▌John Russ (Democratic-Republican) 2.5%
Connecticut at-large 6 seats on a general ticket	Ebenezer Stoddard	Democratic-Republican	1821	Incumbent re-elected.	▌ ✓ Gideon Tomlinson (Adams-Clay D-R) 17.2%; ▌ ✓ Ebenezer Stoddard (Adams-Clay D-R) 16.6%; ▌ ✓ Ansel Sterling (Adams-Clay D-R) 16.1%; ▌ ✓ Lemuel Whitman (Adams-Clay D-R) 13.7%; ▌ ✓ Noyes Barber (Adams-Clay D-R) 13.5%; ▌ ✓ Samuel A. Foot (Adams-Clay D-R) 11.7%; ▌Henry W. Edwards (Democratic-Republican) 5.1%; ▌Daniel Burrows (Democratic-Republican) 3.7%; ▌John Russ (Democratic-Republican) 2.5%
Connecticut at-large 6 seats on a general ticket	Gideon Tomlinson	Democratic-Republican	1818	Incumbent re-elected.	▌ ✓ Gideon Tomlinson (Adams-Clay D-R) 17.2%; ▌ ✓ Ebenezer Stoddard (Adams-Clay D-R) 16.6%; ▌ ✓ Ansel Sterling (Adams-Clay D-R) 16.1%; ▌ ✓ Lemuel Whitman (Adams-Clay D-R) 13.7%; ▌ ✓ Noyes Barber (Adams-Clay D-R) 13.5%; ▌ ✓ Samuel A. Foot (Adams-Clay D-R) 11.7%; ▌Henry W. Edwards (Democratic-Republican) 5.1%; ▌Daniel Burrows (Democratic-Republican) 3.7%; ▌John Russ (Democratic-Republican) 2.5%
Connecticut at-large 6 seats on a general ticket	Ansel Sterling	Democratic-Republican	1821	Incumbent re-elected.	▌ ✓ Gideon Tomlinson (Adams-Clay D-R) 17.2%; ▌ ✓ Ebenezer Stoddard (Adams-Clay D-R) 16.6%; ▌ ✓ Ansel Sterling (Adams-Clay D-R) 16.1%; ▌ ✓ Lemuel Whitman (Adams-Clay D-R) 13.7%; ▌ ✓ Noyes Barber (Adams-Clay D-R) 13.5%; ▌ ✓ Samuel A. Foot (Adams-Clay D-R) 11.7%; ▌Henry W. Edwards (Democratic-Republican) 5.1%; ▌Daniel Burrows (Democratic-Republican) 3.7%; ▌John Russ (Democratic-Republican) 2.5%
Connecticut at-large 6 seats on a general ticket	John Russ	Democratic-Republican	1818	Incumbent lost re-election. Democratic-Republican hold.	▌ ✓ Gideon Tomlinson (Adams-Clay D-R) 17.2%; ▌ ✓ Ebenezer Stoddard (Adams-Clay D-R) 16.6%; ▌ ✓ Ansel Sterling (Adams-Clay D-R) 16.1%; ▌ ✓ Lemuel Whitman (Adams-Clay D-R) 13.7%; ▌ ✓ Noyes Barber (Adams-Clay D-R) 13.5%; ▌ ✓ Samuel A. Foot (Adams-Clay D-R) 11.7%; ▌Henry W. Edwards (Democratic-Republican) 5.1%; ▌Daniel Burrows (Democratic-Republican) 3.7%; ▌John Russ (Democratic-Republican) 2.5%
Connecticut at-large 6 seats on a general ticket	Henry W. Edwards	Democratic-Republican	1818	Incumbent lost re-election. Democratic-Republican hold.	▌ ✓ Gideon Tomlinson (Adams-Clay D-R) 17.2%; ▌ ✓ Ebenezer Stoddard (Adams-Clay D-R) 16.6%; ▌ ✓ Ansel Sterling (Adams-Clay D-R) 16.1%; ▌ ✓ Lemuel Whitman (Adams-Clay D-R) 13.7%; ▌ ✓ Noyes Barber (Adams-Clay D-R) 13.5%; ▌ ✓ Samuel A. Foot (Adams-Clay D-R) 11.7%; ▌Henry W. Edwards (Democratic-Republican) 5.1%; ▌Daniel Burrows (Democratic-Republican) 3.7%; ▌John Russ (Democratic-Republican) 2.5%
Connecticut at-large 6 seats on a general ticket	Daniel Burrows	Democratic-Republican	1821	Incumbent lost re-election. Seat eliminated. Democratic-Republican loss.	

== Delaware ==
Delaware was reduced once more from two back to one seat after the fourth census, which number has remained constant to the present day. At the time of the October 1, 1822, election, the second seat in Delaware's at-large district was vacant, so there was only one incumbent going into the election.

District	Incumbent			This race	
District	Member	Party	First elected	Results	Candidates
Delaware at-large	Louis McLane (Seat A)	Federalist	1816	Incumbent re-elected.	▌ ✓ Louis McLane (Crawford Federalist) 54.2%; ▌Arnold Naudain (Democratic-Republican) 45.7%; Others 0.1%
Delaware at-large	Caesar A. Rodney (Seat B)	Democratic-Republican	1802; 1804 (lost); 1820	Incumbent resigned January 24, 1822, when elected U.S. Senator. Successor was only elected to finish the term (see above) as the seat was eliminated. Democratic-Republican loss.	▌ ✓ Louis McLane (Crawford Federalist) 54.2%; ▌Arnold Naudain (Democratic-Republican) 45.7%; Others 0.1%

== Florida Territory ==
See Non-voting delegates, below.

== Georgia ==
Georgia gained one seat in reapportionment following the 1820 United States census. Georgia elected its members October 7, 1822.

District	Incumbent			This race	
District	Member	Party	First elected	Results	Candidates
Georgia at-large 7 seats on a general ticket	Alfred Cuthbert	Democratic-Republican	1813 (special); 1816 (resigned); 1820	Incumbent re-elected.	▌ ✓ John Forsyth (Crawford D-R) 13.5%; ▌ ✓ Edward F. Tattnall (Crawford D-R) 13.0%; ▌ ✓ Joel Abbot (Crawford D-R) 11.5%; ▌ ✓ Wiley Thompson (Crawford D-R) 11.2%; ▌ ✓ Thomas W. Cobb (Crawford D-R) 11.1%; ▌ ✓ George Cary (Crawford D-R) 9.9%; ▌ ✓ Alfred Cuthbert (Crawford D-R) 9.7%; ▌Thomas Glascock (Unknown) 9.6%; ▌Charles E. Haynes (Jackson D-R) 5.9%; ▌John R. Golding (Unknown) 4.6%
Georgia at-large 7 seats on a general ticket	George R. Gilmer	Democratic-Republican	1820	Incumbent retired. Democratic-Republican hold.	▌ ✓ John Forsyth (Crawford D-R) 13.5%; ▌ ✓ Edward F. Tattnall (Crawford D-R) 13.0%; ▌ ✓ Joel Abbot (Crawford D-R) 11.5%; ▌ ✓ Wiley Thompson (Crawford D-R) 11.2%; ▌ ✓ Thomas W. Cobb (Crawford D-R) 11.1%; ▌ ✓ George Cary (Crawford D-R) 9.9%; ▌ ✓ Alfred Cuthbert (Crawford D-R) 9.7%; ▌Thomas Glascock (Unknown) 9.6%; ▌Charles E. Haynes (Jackson D-R) 5.9%; ▌John R. Golding (Unknown) 4.6%
Georgia at-large 7 seats on a general ticket	Joel Abbot	Democratic-Republican	1816	Incumbent re-elected.	▌ ✓ John Forsyth (Crawford D-R) 13.5%; ▌ ✓ Edward F. Tattnall (Crawford D-R) 13.0%; ▌ ✓ Joel Abbot (Crawford D-R) 11.5%; ▌ ✓ Wiley Thompson (Crawford D-R) 11.2%; ▌ ✓ Thomas W. Cobb (Crawford D-R) 11.1%; ▌ ✓ George Cary (Crawford D-R) 9.9%; ▌ ✓ Alfred Cuthbert (Crawford D-R) 9.7%; ▌Thomas Glascock (Unknown) 9.6%; ▌Charles E. Haynes (Jackson D-R) 5.9%; ▌John R. Golding (Unknown) 4.6%
Georgia at-large 7 seats on a general ticket	Edward F. Tattnall	Democratic-Republican	1820	Incumbent re-elected.	▌ ✓ John Forsyth (Crawford D-R) 13.5%; ▌ ✓ Edward F. Tattnall (Crawford D-R) 13.0%; ▌ ✓ Joel Abbot (Crawford D-R) 11.5%; ▌ ✓ Wiley Thompson (Crawford D-R) 11.2%; ▌ ✓ Thomas W. Cobb (Crawford D-R) 11.1%; ▌ ✓ George Cary (Crawford D-R) 9.9%; ▌ ✓ Alfred Cuthbert (Crawford D-R) 9.7%; ▌Thomas Glascock (Unknown) 9.6%; ▌Charles E. Haynes (Jackson D-R) 5.9%; ▌John R. Golding (Unknown) 4.6%
Georgia at-large 7 seats on a general ticket	Robert R. Reid	Democratic-Republican	1819 (special)	Incumbent retired. Democratic-Republican hold.	▌ ✓ John Forsyth (Crawford D-R) 13.5%; ▌ ✓ Edward F. Tattnall (Crawford D-R) 13.0%; ▌ ✓ Joel Abbot (Crawford D-R) 11.5%; ▌ ✓ Wiley Thompson (Crawford D-R) 11.2%; ▌ ✓ Thomas W. Cobb (Crawford D-R) 11.1%; ▌ ✓ George Cary (Crawford D-R) 9.9%; ▌ ✓ Alfred Cuthbert (Crawford D-R) 9.7%; ▌Thomas Glascock (Unknown) 9.6%; ▌Charles E. Haynes (Jackson D-R) 5.9%; ▌John R. Golding (Unknown) 4.6%
Georgia at-large 7 seats on a general ticket	Wiley Thompson	Democratic-Republican	1820	Incumbent re-elected.	▌ ✓ John Forsyth (Crawford D-R) 13.5%; ▌ ✓ Edward F. Tattnall (Crawford D-R) 13.0%; ▌ ✓ Joel Abbot (Crawford D-R) 11.5%; ▌ ✓ Wiley Thompson (Crawford D-R) 11.2%; ▌ ✓ Thomas W. Cobb (Crawford D-R) 11.1%; ▌ ✓ George Cary (Crawford D-R) 9.9%; ▌ ✓ Alfred Cuthbert (Crawford D-R) 9.7%; ▌Thomas Glascock (Unknown) 9.6%; ▌Charles E. Haynes (Jackson D-R) 5.9%; ▌John R. Golding (Unknown) 4.6%
Georgia at-large 7 seats on a general ticket	None (new seat)			New seat. Democratic-Republican gain.	▌ ✓ John Forsyth (Crawford D-R) 13.5%; ▌ ✓ Edward F. Tattnall (Crawford D-R) 13.0%; ▌ ✓ Joel Abbot (Crawford D-R) 11.5%; ▌ ✓ Wiley Thompson (Crawford D-R) 11.2%; ▌ ✓ Thomas W. Cobb (Crawford D-R) 11.1%; ▌ ✓ George Cary (Crawford D-R) 9.9%; ▌ ✓ Alfred Cuthbert (Crawford D-R) 9.7%; ▌Thomas Glascock (Unknown) 9.6%; ▌Charles E. Haynes (Jackson D-R) 5.9%; ▌John R. Golding (Unknown) 4.6%

== Illinois ==
Illinois elected its sole at-large member August 5, 1822.

District	Incumbent			This race	
District	Member	Party	First elected	Results	Candidates
Illinois at-large	Daniel P. Cook	Democratic- Republican	1819	Incumbent re-elected.	▌ ✓ Daniel P. Cook (Adams-Clay D-R) 55.6%; ▌John McLean (Democratic-Republican) 44.4%; ▌Elias Kane (Democratic-Republican) <0.1%

== Indiana ==
Indiana gained two seats in reapportionment following the 1820 United States census, and elected its members August 5, 1822.

Indiana's single at-large seat in the 17th Congress was empty at the time of the election, previous incumbent William Hendricks (Democratic-Republican) having resigned to run for Governor of Indiana. Jonathan Jennings (Jackson D-R), elected to the new 2nd district, was elected in the ensuing special election to fill the at-large district for the remainder of the 17th Congress.

District	Incumbent			This race	
District	Member	Party	First elected	Results	Candidates
Indiana 1	None (new district)			New seat. Democratic-Republican gain.	▌ ✓ William Prince (Jackson D-R) 57.4%; ▌Charles Dewey (Unknown) 42.6%
Indiana 2	None (new district)			New seat. Democratic-Republican gain. Successor also elected the same day to finish the term in the expiring at-large district; see above.	▌ ✓ Jonathan Jennings (Jackson D-R) 60.5%; ▌James Scott (Unknown) 39.5%
Indiana 3	William Hendricks; Redistricted from the at-large district	Democratic- Republican	1816	Incumbent resigned July 25, 1822, to run for Governor of Indiana. Democratic-Republican gain.	▌ ✓ John Test (Jackson D-R) 46.5%; ▌Samuel C. Vance (Unknown) 32.7%; ▌Ezra Ferris (Unknown) 20.8%

== Kentucky ==
Kentucky gained two seats in reapportionment following the 1820 United States census. Kentucky elected its members August 5, 1822.

District	Incumbent			This race	
District	Member	Party	First elected	Results	Candidates
Kentucky 1	David Trimble	Democratic- Republican	1816	Incumbent re-elected.	▌ ✓ David Trimble (Adams-Clay D-R) 79.8%; ▌Thomas Fletcher (Democratic-Republican) 20.2%
Kentucky 2	Thomas Metcalfe; Redistricted from the 4th district	Democratic- Republican	1818	Incumbent re-elected.	▌ ✓ Thomas Metcalfe (Adams-Clay D-R) 73.8%; ▌William Worthington (Unknown) 14.0%; ▌Walker Reid (Unknown) 12.3%
Kentucky 3	None (new district)			New seat. Adams Republican gain.	▌ ✓ Henry Clay (Adams-Clay D-R) 100%
Kentucky 4	John S. Smith; Redistricted from the 7th district	Democratic- Republican	1821 (special)	Incumbent lost re-election. Democratic-Republican hold.	▌ ✓ Robert P. Letcher (Adams-Clay D-R) 52.2%; ▌John S. Smith (Democratic-Republican) 47.8%
Kentucky 5	John T. Johnson; Redistricted from the 3rd district	Democratic- Republican	1820	Incumbent re-elected.	▌ ✓ John T. Johnson (Jackson D-R) 47.5% (Note: Based on incomplete data.); ▌Robert McHatton (Jackson D-R) 47.8%; ▌Alfred Sanford (Unknown) 4.7%
Kentucky 6	None (new district)			New seat. Adams Republican gain.	▌ ✓ David White (Adams-Clay D-R) 56.1%; ▌John Logan (Unknown) 43.9%
Kentucky 7	Samuel H. Woodson; Redistricted from the 2nd district	Democratic- Republican	1820	Incumbent lost re-election. Democratic-Republican hold.	▌ ✓ Thomas P. Moore (Jackson D-R) 41.5%; ▌John Pope (Democratic-Republican) 29.7%; ▌Samuel H. Woodson (Democratic-Republican) 28.8%
Kentucky 8	None (new district)			New seat. Adams Republican gain.	▌ ✓ Richard A. Bucker (Adams-Clay D-R) (Note: Numbers of votes missing or incomplete in source.); Nathan Gaither (Jackson Democratic-Republican?)
Kentucky 9	James D. Breckinridge; Redistricted from the 8th district	Democratic- Republican	1821 (special)	Incumbent lost re-election. Democratic-Republican hold.	▌ ✓ Charles A. Wickliffe (Jackson D-R) 52.0%; ▌James D. Breckinridge (Democratic-Republican) 48.0%
Kentucky 10	Francis Johnson; Redistricted from the 6th district	Democratic- Republican	1820	Incumbent re-elected.	▌ ✓ Francis Johnson (Adams-Clay D-R) 100%
Kentucky 11	None (new district)			New seat. Adams Republican gain.	▌ ✓ Philip Thompson (Adams-Clay D-R); ▌James Crutcher (Unknown); ▌William Inglish (Unknown); ▌John S. Eave (Unknown)
Kentucky 12	None (new district)			New seat. Jackson Republican gain.	▌ ✓ Robert P. Henry (Jackson D-R) (Note: Numbers of votes not available in source, said to have won by a majority of 101 votes.); ▌Dickson Given (Unknown); ▌Breathitt (Note: Source does not give full name.) (Unknown); ▌Young Ewing (Unknown)

== Louisiana ==
Louisiana gained two seats in reapportionment following the 1820 United States census. Louisiana elected its members July 1–3, 1822.

District	Incumbent			This race	
District	Member	Party	First elected	Results	Candidates
Louisiana 1	None (new district)			New seat. Democratic-Republican gain.	▌ ✓ Edward Livingston (Jackson D-R) 98.1%; Others 1.9%
Louisiana 2	None (new district)			New seat. Democratic-Republican gain.	▌ ✓ Henry H. Gurley (Adams-Clay D-R) 46.1%; ▌W. S. Hamilton (Unknown) 31.6%; ▌James M. Bradford (Unknown) 22.3%
Louisiana 3	Josiah S. Johnston; Redistricted from the at-large district	Democratic- Republican	1820	Incumbent lost re-election. Democratic-Republican hold.	▌ ✓ William L. Brent (Adams-Clay D-R) 55.7%; ▌Josiah S. Johnston (Adams-Clay D-R) 44.3%

== Maine ==
Although Maine neither gained nor lost seats after the 1820 United States census, redistricting placed two incumbents into the 3rd district. Maine elected its members April 7, 1823, after the term began but before the new Congress convened. Maine law required a majority for election, with additional ballots taken if a majority were not achieved. This proved necessary in 1822 in the 1st, 3rd, 4th, and 6th districts, but all members were still chosen before the new Congress convened.

District	Incumbent			This race	
District	Member	Party	First elected	Results	Candidates
Maine 1	Joseph Dane	Federalist	1820 (special)	Incumbent retired. Democratic-Republican gain.	First ballot (April 7, 1823): ▌Isaac Lane (Democratic-Republican) 29.9%; ▌William Burleigh (Adams-Clay D-R) 27.7%; ▌Thomas G. Thornton (Democratic-Republican) 11.4%; ▌Edward P. Hayman (Unknown) 8.8%; ▌Rufus McIntire (Jackson D-R) 8.0%; ▌Benjamin Greene (Unknown) 7.5%; ▌John MacDonald (Unknown) 5.5%; Others 1.2%; Second ballot (June 30, 1823): ▌William Burleigh (Adams-Clay D-R) 41.6%; ▌Isaac Lane (Democratic-Republican) 33.5%; ▌Rufus McIntire (Jackson D-R) 20.7%; ▌John MacDonald (Unknown) 1.3%; ▌Edward P. Hayman (Unknown) 1.0%; Others 1.9%; Third ballot (September 9, 1823): ▌William Burleigh (Adams-Clay D-R) 48.4%; ▌Rufus McIntire (Jackson D-R) 42.2%; ▌Isaac Lane (Democratic-Republican) 7.7%; Others 1.8%; Fourth ballot (November 3, 1823): ▌ ✓ William Burleigh (Adams-Clay D-R) 52.3%; ▌Rufus McIntire (Jackson D-R) 47.7%
Maine 2	Mark Harris	Democratic- Republican	1822 (special)	Incumbent retired. Federalist gain.	▌ ✓ Stephen Longfellow (Adams-Clay Federalist) 50.5%; ▌John Anderson (Democratic-Republican) 47.7%; Others 1.8%
Maine 3	Ebenezer Herrick; Redistricted from the 5th district	Democratic- Republican	1820	Incumbent re-elected.	First ballot (April 7, 1823): ▌Mark Langdon Hill (Democratic-Republican) 31.6%; ▌Ebenezer Herrick (Adams-Clay D-R) 26.1%; ▌Jeremiah Bailey (Federalist) 22.9%; ▌Daniel Rose (Democratic-Republican) 15.6%; Samuel Thatcher (Federalist?) 3.3%; Second ballot (June 30, 1823): ▌Mark Langdon Hill (Democratic-Republican) 40.1%; ▌Ebenezer Herrick (Adams-Clay D-R) 39.4%; ▌Jeremiah Bailey (Federalist) 16.0%; ▌Daniel Rose (Democratic-Republican) 3.1%; ▌Samuel Thatcher (Federalist?) 1.1%; Others 0.3%; Third ballot (September 9, 1823): ▌ ✓ Ebenezer Herrick (Adams-Clay D-R) 63.5%; ▌Mark Langdon Hill (Democratic-Republican) 35.7%; Others 0.8%
Maine 3	Mark Langdon Hill	Democratic- Republican	1819	Incumbent lost re-election. Democratic-Republican loss.	
Maine 4	Joshua Cushman; Redistricted from the 6th district	Democratic- Republican	1818	Incumbent re-elected.	First ballot (April 7, 1823): ▌Joshua Cushman (Adams-Clay D-R) 47.8%; ▌Ebenezer T. Warren (Adams-Clay D-R) 47.3%; ▌Sanford Kingsbury (Unknown) 1.7%; ▌James Parker (Democratic-Republican) 1.4%; ▌Thomas Fillebrown (Unknown) 1.3%; ▌Nathan Cutler (Unknown) 0.5%; Second ballot (June 30, 1823): ▌ ✓ Joshua Cushman (Adams-Clay D-R) 60.2%; ▌Ebenezer T. Warren (Adams-Clay D-R) 29.1%; ▌Josiah Prescott (Unknown) 7.5%; Others 3.2%
Maine 5	Enoch Lincoln; Redistricted from the 7th district	Democratic- Republican	1818 (special)	Incumbent re-elected.	▌ ✓ Enoch Lincoln (Adams-Clay D-R) 96.7%; ▌Ezekiel Thompson (Unknown) 1.7%; Others 1.6%
Maine 6	None (new district)			New seat. Democratic-Republican gain.	First ballot (April 7, 1823): ▌Jeremiah O'Brien (Adams-Clay D-R) 31.4%; ▌Alfred Johnson Jr. (Democratic-Republican) 28.2%; ▌William Abbott (Federalist) 25.4%; ▌Aaron Holbrook (Democratic-Republican) 9.4%; ▌Jonathan D. Weston (Unknown) 3.9%; Others 1.7%; Second ballot (June 30, 1823): ▌Jeremiah O'Brien (Adams-Clay D-R) 40.8%; ▌Alfred Johnson Jr. (Democratic-Republican) 37.1%; ▌William Abbott (Federalist) 21.9%; Others 0.2%; Third ballot (September 9, 1823): ▌ ✓ Jeremiah O'Brien (Adams-Clay D-R) 53.2%; ▌Alfred Johnson Jr. (Democratic-Republican) 26.6%; ▌William Abbott (Federalist) 18.7%; Others 1.5%
Maine 7	William D. Williamson; Redistricted from the 4th district	Democratic- Republican	1820	Incumbent lost re-election. Democratic-Republican hold.	▌ ✓ David Kidder (Adams-Clay D-R) 51.8%; ▌William Emerson (Democratic-Republican) 24.7%; ▌Obid Wilson (Unknown) 17.8%; Others 5.8%

== Maryland ==
Maryland elected its members October 7, 1822.

District	Incumbent			This race	
District	Member	Party	First elected	Results	Candidates
Maryland 1	Raphael Neale	Federalist	1818	Incumbent re-elected.	▌ ✓ Raphael Neale (Adams-Clay Federalist) 64.7%; ▌Thomas Blackiston (Federalist) 34.9%; Others 0.4%
Maryland 2	Joseph Kent	Democratic- Republican	1818	Incumbent re-elected.	▌ ✓ Joseph Kent (Adams-Clay D-R) 99.5%; Others 0.5%
Maryland 3	Henry R. Warfield	Federalist	1818	Incumbent re-elected.	▌ ✓ Henry R. Warfield (Adams-Clay Federalist) 97.1%; ▌Barton Harris (Unknown) 2.9%
Maryland 4	John Nelson	Democratic- Republican	1820	Incumbent retired. Federalist gain.	▌ ✓ John Lee (Jackson Federalist) 30.9%; ▌Thomas C. Worthington (Jackson D-R) 30.1%; ▌Michael Sprigg (Jackson D-R) 24.8%; ▌Casper Weaver (Democratic-Republican) 6.6%; ▌William Gabby (Democratic-Republican) 6.1%; ▌Joseph Swearingin (Democratic-Republican) 1.5%
Maryland 5 Plural district with 2 seats	Peter Little	Democratic- Republican	1810; 1812 (lost); 1816	Incumbent re-elected.	▌ ✓ Peter Little (Jackson D-R) 44.1%; ▌ ✓ Samuel Smith (Crawford D-R) 43.2%; ▌John Patterson (Democratic-Republican) 12.7%
Maryland 5 Plural district with 2 seats	Samuel Smith	Democratic- Republican	1792; 1803 (retired); 1816	Incumbent re-elected but resigned December 17, 1822, leading to a pair of special elections for the current and next congresses.	▌ ✓ Peter Little (Jackson D-R) 44.1%; ▌ ✓ Samuel Smith (Crawford D-R) 43.2%; ▌John Patterson (Democratic-Republican) 12.7%
Maryland 6	Philip Reed	Democratic- Republican	1816; 1818 (lost); 1820	Incumbent lost re-election. Democratic-Republican hold.	▌ ✓ George E. Mitchell (Adams-Clay D-R) 94.3%; ▌Peregrine L. Lynch (Democratic-Republican) 4.2%; ▌Philip Reed (Democratic-Republican) 0.3%; Others 1.2%
Maryland 7	Robert Wright	Democratic- Republican	1810; 1816 (lost); 1820	Incumbent retired. Democratic-Republican hold.	▌ ✓ William Hayward Jr. (Crawford D-R) 54.6%; ▌Thomas Emory (Democratic-Republican) 45.4%
Maryland 8	Thomas Bayly	Federalist	1816	Incumbent retired. Democratic-Republican gain.	▌ ✓ John S. Spence (Adams-Clay D-R) 66.5%; ▌James Murray (Federalist) 33.5%; Others 0.1%

== Massachusetts ==
Massachusetts elected its members November 4, 1822. Massachusetts law required a majority for election, which was not met in 3 districts, necessitating additional elections on March 3, 1823, and May 12, 1823; nevertheless, all elections were complete before the new Congress convened.

District numbers differed between source used and elsewhere on Wikipedia; district numbers used elsewhere on Wikipedia used here.

District	Incumbent			This race	
District	Member	Party	First elected	Results	Candidates
Massachusetts 1 "Suffolk district"	Benjamin Gorham	Federalist	1820	Incumbent retired. Federalist hold.	▌ ✓ Daniel Webster (Adams-Clay Federalist) 62.9%; ▌Jesse Putnam (Democratic-Republican) 37.1%
Massachusetts 2 "Essex South district"	Gideon Barstow	Democratic- Republican	1821	Incumbent retired. Democratic-Republican hold.	First ballot (November 4, 1822): ▌Benjamin W. Crowninshield (Adams-Clay D-R) 48.4%; ▌Benjamin Merrill (Federalist) 41.9%; ▌Willard Peele (Independent) 9.7%; Second ballot (March 3, 1823): ▌ ✓ Benjamin W. Crowninshield (Adams-Clay D-R) 51.9%; ▌Benjamin Merrill (Federalist) 27.4%; ▌Willard Peele (Independent) 20.8%
Massachusetts 3 "Essex North district"	Jeremiah Nelson	Federalist	1804; 1806 (retired); 1814	Incumbent re-elected.	▌ ✓ Jeremiah Nelson (Adams-Clay Federalist) 76.0%; ▌Amos Spaulding (Democratic-Republican) 24.0%
Massachusetts 4 "Middlesex district"	Timothy Fuller	Democratic- Republican	1816	Incumbent re-elected.	▌ ✓ Timothy Fuller (Adams-Clay D-R) 89.2%; ▌Thomas Harris (Unknown) 6.9%; Others 3.8%
Massachusetts 5 "Worcester South district"	Jonathan Russell; Redistricted from the 11th district	Democratic- Republican	1820	Incumbent retired. Democratic-Republican hold.	First ballot (November 4, 1822): ▌Jonas Sibley (Adams-Clay D-R) 47.8%; ▌Benjamin Adams (Federalist) 45.3%; ▌Seth Hastings (Unknown) 4.7%; Others 2.2%; Second ballot (March 3, 1823): ▌ ✓ Jonas Sibley (Adams-Clay D-R) 53.5%; ▌Benjamin Adams (Federalist) 39.1%; ▌Seth Hastings (Unknown) 7.4%
Massachusetts 6 "Worcester North district"	Lewis Bigelow; Redistricted from the 12th district	Federalist	1820	Incumbent lost re-election. Democratic-Republican gain.	First ballot (November 4, 1822): ▌Samuel Dana (Democratic-Republican) 42.9%; ▌Lewis Bigelow (Federalist) 34.3%; ▌James Kendall (Federalist) 22.8%; Second ballot (March 3, 1823): ▌Samuel Dana (Democratic-Republican) 45.9%; ▌Lewis Bigelow (Federalist) 32.0%; ▌James Kendall (Federalist) 22.2%; Third ballot (May 12, 1823): ▌ ✓ John Locke (Adams-Clay D-R) 53.3%; ▌Samuel Dana (Democratic-Republican) 46.7%
Massachusetts 7 "Franklin district"	Samuel C. Allen; Redistricted from the 6th district	Federalist	1816	Incumbent re-elected.	▌ ✓ Samuel C. Allen (Adams-Clay Federalist) 91.1%; Others 8.9%
Massachusetts 8 "Hampden district"	Samuel Lathrop; Redistricted from the 5th district	Federalist	1819	Incumbent re-elected.	▌ ✓ Samuel Lathrop (Adams-Clay Federalist) 81.2%; ▌Thomas Shepherd (Democratic-Republican) 18.8%
Massachusetts 9 "Berkshire district"	Henry W. Dwight; Redistricted from the 7th district	Federalist	1820	Incumbent re-elected.	▌ ✓ Henry W. Dwight (Adams-Clay Federalist) 62.4%; ▌William Jarvis (Democratic-Republican) 37.6%
Massachusetts 10 "Norfolk district"	William Eustis; Redistricted from the 13th district	Democratic- Republican	1800; 1804 (lost); 1820 (special)	Incumbent re-elected but declined the seat to become Governor of Massachusetts, leading to a special election.	▌ ✓ William Eustis (Democratic-Republican) 84.5%; ▌Richard Sullivan (Federalist) 5.7%; Others 9.8%
Massachusetts 11 "Plymouth district"	Aaron Hobart; Redistricted from the 8th district	Democratic- Republican	1820	Incumbent re-elected.	▌ ✓ Aaron Hobart (Adams-Clay D-R) 58.1%; ▌Cushing Otis (Federalist) 41.9%
Massachusetts 12 "Bristol district"	Francis Baylies; Redistricted from the 10th district	Federalist	1820	Incumbent re-elected.	▌ ✓ Francis Baylies (Jackson Federalist) 66.8%; ▌Hercules Cushman (Democratic-Republican) 33.2%
Massachusetts 13 "Barnstable district"	John Reed Jr. Redistricted from the 9th district	Federalist	1812; 1816 (lost); 1820	Incumbent re-elected.	▌ ✓ John Reed Jr. (Adams-Clay Federalist) 53.5%; ▌Walter Folger Jr. (Democratic-Republican) 46.5%

== Michigan Territory ==
See Non-voting delegates, below.

== Mississippi ==
Mississippi elected its member August 5–6, 1822.

District	Incumbent			This race	
District	Member	Party	First elected	Results	Candidates
Mississippi at-large	Christopher Rankin	Democratic- Republican	1819	Incumbent re-elected.	▌ ✓ Christopher Rankin (Jackson D-R) 64.8%; ▌George Poindexter (Jackson D-R) 35.2%

== Missouri ==
Missouri elected its member October 7, 1822.

District	Incumbent			This race	
District	Member	Party	First elected	Results	Candidates
Missouri at-large	John Scott	Democratic- Republican	1820	Incumbent re-elected.	▌ ✓ John Scott (Adams-Clay D-R) 60.0%; ▌John B. Lucas (Democratic-Republican) 25.2%; ▌Alexander Stuart (Unknown) 14.8%

== New Hampshire ==
New Hampshire elected its members August 26, 1822. New Hampshire law required a candidate to receive votes from a majority of voters for election, that is 1/12 of votes. Only five candidates received the requisite majority, and so a May 11, 1823, run-off election was held for the sixth seat.

District	Incumbent			This race	
District	Member	Party	First elected	Results	Candidates
New Hampshire at-large 6 seats on a general ticket	Josiah Butler	Democratic- Republican	1816	Incumbent retired. Democratic-Republican hold.	First ballot (August 26, 1822): ▌ ✓ Matthew Harvey (Adams-Clay D-R) 16.6%; ▌ ✓ William Plumer Jr. (Adams-Clay D-R) 16.1%; ▌ ✓ Aaron Matson (Adams-Clay D-R) 15.2%; ▌ ✓ Ichabod Bartlett (Adams-Clay D-R) 14.9%; ▌ ✓ Thomas Whipple Jr. (Adams-Clay D-R) 11.6%; ▌Edmund Parker (Democratic-Republican) 6.8%; ▌Charles Wooman (Democratic-Republican) 5.7%; ▌Arthur Livermore (Adams-Clay D-R) 3.9%; ▌Estwicke Evans (Independent) 3.0%; ▌Richard Odell (Independent) 2.9%; ▌Nichol Eastman (Independent) 1.9%; ▌William Vale (Independent) 1.5%; Second ballot (May 11, 1823): ▌ ✓ Arthur Livermore (Adams-Clay D-R) 38.8%; ▌Edmund Parker (Democratic-Republican) 31.4%; ▌Richard Odell (Independent) 29.8%
New Hampshire at-large 6 seats on a general ticket	Nathaniel Upham	Democratic- Republican	1816	Incumbent retired. Democratic-Republican hold.	
New Hampshire at-large 6 seats on a general ticket	Matthew Harvey	Democratic- Republican	1820	Incumbent re-elected.	
New Hampshire at-large 6 seats on a general ticket	Aaron Matson	Democratic- Republican	1820	Incumbent re-elected.	
New Hampshire at-large 6 seats on a general ticket	William Plumer Jr.	Democratic- Republican	1818	Incumbent re-elected.	
New Hampshire at-large 6 seats on a general ticket	Thomas Whipple Jr.	Democratic- Republican	1820	Incumbent re-elected.	

== New Jersey ==
New Jersey elected its members October 15, 1822.

District	Incumbent			This race	
District	Member	Party	First elected	Results	Candidates
New Jersey at-large 6 seats on a general ticket	George Holcombe	Democratic-Republican	1820	Incumbent re-elected.	▌ ✓ George Holcombe (Jackson D-R) 16.6%; ▌ ✓ George Cassedy (Jackson D-R) 16.3%; ▌ ✓ Lewis Condict (Jackson D-R) 16.3%; ▌ ✓ Samuel Swan (Jackson D-R) 16.3%; ▌ ✓ James Matlack (Adams-Clay D-R) 16.2%; ▌ ✓ Daniel Garrison (Jackson D-R) 16.1%; ▌Ephraim Bateman (Democratic-Republican) 2.1%
New Jersey at-large 6 seats on a general ticket	George Cassedy	Democratic-Republican	1820	Incumbent re-elected.	▌ ✓ George Holcombe (Jackson D-R) 16.6%; ▌ ✓ George Cassedy (Jackson D-R) 16.3%; ▌ ✓ Lewis Condict (Jackson D-R) 16.3%; ▌ ✓ Samuel Swan (Jackson D-R) 16.3%; ▌ ✓ James Matlack (Adams-Clay D-R) 16.2%; ▌ ✓ Daniel Garrison (Jackson D-R) 16.1%; ▌Ephraim Bateman (Democratic-Republican) 2.1%
New Jersey at-large 6 seats on a general ticket	Lewis Condict	Democratic-Republican	1821 (special)	Incumbent re-elected.	▌ ✓ George Holcombe (Jackson D-R) 16.6%; ▌ ✓ George Cassedy (Jackson D-R) 16.3%; ▌ ✓ Lewis Condict (Jackson D-R) 16.3%; ▌ ✓ Samuel Swan (Jackson D-R) 16.3%; ▌ ✓ James Matlack (Adams-Clay D-R) 16.2%; ▌ ✓ Daniel Garrison (Jackson D-R) 16.1%; ▌Ephraim Bateman (Democratic-Republican) 2.1%
New Jersey at-large 6 seats on a general ticket	Samuel Swan	Democratic-Republican	1820	Incumbent re-elected.	▌ ✓ George Holcombe (Jackson D-R) 16.6%; ▌ ✓ George Cassedy (Jackson D-R) 16.3%; ▌ ✓ Lewis Condict (Jackson D-R) 16.3%; ▌ ✓ Samuel Swan (Jackson D-R) 16.3%; ▌ ✓ James Matlack (Adams-Clay D-R) 16.2%; ▌ ✓ Daniel Garrison (Jackson D-R) 16.1%; ▌Ephraim Bateman (Democratic-Republican) 2.1%
New Jersey at-large 6 seats on a general ticket	James Matlack	Democratic-Republican	1820	Incumbent re-elected.	▌ ✓ George Holcombe (Jackson D-R) 16.6%; ▌ ✓ George Cassedy (Jackson D-R) 16.3%; ▌ ✓ Lewis Condict (Jackson D-R) 16.3%; ▌ ✓ Samuel Swan (Jackson D-R) 16.3%; ▌ ✓ James Matlack (Adams-Clay D-R) 16.2%; ▌ ✓ Daniel Garrison (Jackson D-R) 16.1%; ▌Ephraim Bateman (Democratic-Republican) 2.1%
New Jersey at-large 6 seats on a general ticket	Ephraim Bateman	Democratic-Republican	1814	Incumbent lost re-election. Democratic-Republican hold.	▌ ✓ George Holcombe (Jackson D-R) 16.6%; ▌ ✓ George Cassedy (Jackson D-R) 16.3%; ▌ ✓ Lewis Condict (Jackson D-R) 16.3%; ▌ ✓ Samuel Swan (Jackson D-R) 16.3%; ▌ ✓ James Matlack (Adams-Clay D-R) 16.2%; ▌ ✓ Daniel Garrison (Jackson D-R) 16.1%; ▌Ephraim Bateman (Democratic-Republican) 2.1%

== New York ==
New York's representation increased after the 1820 United States census from 27 to 34 seats, elected from 30 districts, two with two members each, and one with three members. New York elected its members November 4–6, 1822.

As in the previous election, the Democratic-Republican Party in New York was divided into two factions, the "Bucktails" and the Clintonians, which distinction is not marked here. The Clintonians and the Federalists ran on a joint ticket in 1822 as in 1821, in some cases, it's unclear which party a candidate belonged to, those are marked Crawford Federalist.

District	Incumbent			This race	
District	Member	Party	First elected	Results	Candidates
New York 1	Silas Wood	Federalist	1818	Incumbent re-elected as a Democratic-Republican; Democratic-Republican gain.	▌ ✓ Silas Wood (Adams-Clay D-R) 50.5%; ▌John P. Osborn (Democratic-Republican) 49.5%
New York 2	None (new district)			New seat. Democratic-Republican gain.	▌ ✓ Jacob Tyson (Crawford D-R) 90.9%; ▌Jacob Patchen (Crawford Federalist) 9.1%
New York 3 Plural district with 3 seats	John J. Morgan; Redistricted from the 2nd district	Democratic- Republican	1821	Incumbent re-elected.	▌ ✓ John J. Morgan (Jackson D-R) 34.0%; ▌ ✓ Churchill C. Cambreleng (Crawford D-R) 33.7%; ▌ ✓ Peter Sharpe (Adams-Clay D-R) 32.3%
New York 3 Plural district with 3 seats	Churchill C. Cambreleng; Redistricted from the 2nd district	Democratic- Republican	1821	Incumbent re-elected.	▌ ✓ John J. Morgan (Jackson D-R) 34.0%; ▌ ✓ Churchill C. Cambreleng (Crawford D-R) 33.7%; ▌ ✓ Peter Sharpe (Adams-Clay D-R) 32.3%
New York 3 Plural district with 3 seats	None (new seat)			New seat. Democratic-Republican gain.	▌ ✓ John J. Morgan (Jackson D-R) 34.0%; ▌ ✓ Churchill C. Cambreleng (Crawford D-R) 33.7%; ▌ ✓ Peter Sharpe (Adams-Clay D-R) 32.3%
New York 4	None (new district)			New seat. Democratic-Republican gain.	▌ ✓ Joel Frost (Crawford D-R) 68.6%; ▌Abraham Smith (Crawford Federalist) 21.0%; ▌Peter A. Jay (Federalist) 10.3%
New York 5	William W. Van Wyck; Redistricted from the 4th district	Democratic- Republican	1821	Incumbent re-elected.	▌ ✓ William W. Van Wyck (Adams-Clay D-R) 71.1%; ▌Derrick B. Stockhold (Crawford Federalist) 28.9%
New York 6	None (new district)			New seat. Democratic-Republican gain.	▌ ✓ Hector Craig (Jackson D-R) 57.5%; ▌Charles Ludlow (Democratic-Republican) 42.5%
New York 7	Charles H. Ruggles	Federalist	1821	Incumbent lost re-election. Democratic-Republican gain.	▌ ✓ Lemuel Jenkins (Crawford D-R) 57.1%; ▌Charles H. Ruggles (Federalist) 42.9%
New York 8	None (new district)			New seat. Federalist gain.	▌ ✓ James Strong (Federalist) 57.7%; ▌Joseph D. Monnell (Democratic-Republican) 42.3%
New York 9	John D. Dickinson; Redistricted from the 10th district	Federalist	1818	Incumbent lost re-election. Democratic-Republican gain.	▌ ✓ James L. Hogeboom (Democratic-Republican) 53.1%; ▌John D. Dickinson (Federalist) 46.9%
New York 10	Stephen Van Rensselaer; Redistricted from the 9th district	Federalist	1822 (special)	Incumbent re-elected.	▌ ✓ Stephen Van Rensselaer (Adams-Clay Federalist) 100%
New York 11	None (new district)			New seat. Democratic-Republican gain.	▌ ✓ Charles A. Foote (Crawford D-R) 54.1%; ▌John T. More (Crawford Federalist) 45.9%
New York 12	None (new district)			New seat. Democratic-Republican gain.	▌ ✓ Lewis Eaton (Crawford D-R) 62.8%; ▌Nicholas F. Beck (Crawford Federalist) 34.7%; ▌Henry R. Teller (Crawford Federalist) 1.7%; ▌Gideon Halladay (Unknown) 0.7%
New York 13	None (new district)			New seat. Democratic-Republican gain.	▌ ✓ Isaac Williams Jr. (Adams-Clay D-R) 98.6%; Others 1.4%
New York 14	None (new district)			New seat. Federalist gain.	▌ ✓ Henry R. Storrs (Adams-Clay Federalist) 50.5%; ▌Ezekiel Bacon (Democratic-Republican) 49.4%; Others 0.1%
New York 15	None (new district)			New seat. Democratic-Republican gain.	▌ ✓ John Herkimer (Adams-Clay D-R) 59.6%; ▌Simeon Ford (Crawford Federalist) 40.4%
New York 16	None (new district)			New seat. Democratic-Republican gain.	▌ ✓ John W. Cady (Adams-Clay D-R) 50.7%; ▌Alexander Sheldon (Democratic-Republican) 49.2%; Others 0.1%
New York 17	John W. Taylor; Redistricted from the 11th district	Democratic- Republican	1812	Incumbent re-elected.	▌ ✓ John W. Taylor (Adams-Clay D-R) 54.2%; ▌George Palmer (Democratic-Republican) 45.8%
New York 18	None (new district)			New seat. Democratic-Republican gain.	▌ ✓ Henry C. Martindale (Adams-Clay D-R) 55.0%; ▌David Russell (Crawford Federalist) 44.9%; Others 0.1%
New York 19	None (new district)			New seat. Democratic-Republican gain.	▌ ✓ John Richards (Crawford D-R) 52.1%; ▌Ezra C. Gross (Crawford Federalist) 45.7%; Others 2.2%
New York 20 Plural district with 2 seats	None (new district)			New seat. Democratic-Republican gain.	▌ ✓ Egbert Ten Eyck (Crawford D-R) 49.9%; ▌ ✓ Ela Collins (Crawford D-R) 49.5%; Others 0.6%
New York 20 Plural district with 2 seats	None (new district)			New seat. Democratic-Republican gain.	▌ ✓ Egbert Ten Eyck (Crawford D-R) 49.9%; ▌ ✓ Ela Collins (Crawford D-R) 49.5%; Others 0.6%
New York 21	Samuel Campbell	Democratic- Republican	1821	Incumbent lost re-election. Democratic-Republican hold.	▌ ✓ Lot Clark (Crawford D-R) 72.9%; ▌Samuel Campbell (Democratic-Republican) 26.4%; Others 0.6%
New York 22	None (new district)			New seat. Democratic-Republican gain.	▌ ✓ Justin Dwinell (Crawford D-R) 94.7%; Others 5.3%
New York 23	Elisha Litchfield; Redistricted from the 19th district	Democratic- Republican	1821	Incumbent re-elected.	▌ ✓ Elisha Litchfield (Crawford D-R) 59.6%; ▌Asa Wells (Crawford Federalist) 40.4%
New York 24	None (new district)			New seat. Democratic-Republican gain.	▌ ✓ Rowland Day (Crawford D-R) 59.2%; ▌Jonathan Richmond (Crawford Federalist) 40.7%; Others <0.1%
New York 25	David Woodcock; Redistricted from the 20th district	Democratic- Republican	1821	Incumbent lost re-election. Democratic-Republican hold.	▌ ✓ Samuel Lawrence (Adams-Clay D-R) 52.5%; ▌David Woodcock (Democratic-Republican) 47.5%
New York 26 Plural district with 2 seats	None (new district)			New seat. Democratic-Republican gain.	▌ ✓ Dudley Marvin (Adams-Clay D-R) 33.6%; ▌ ✓ Robert S. Rose (Adams-Clay D-R) 22.7%; ▌William Thompson (Crawford Federalist) 19.1%; ▌John Price (Crawford Federalist) 13.9%; ▌Micah Brooks (Democratic-Republican) 10.6%; Others 0.1%
New York 26 Plural district with 2 seats	None (new district)			New seat. Democratic-Republican gain.	▌ ✓ Dudley Marvin (Adams-Clay D-R) 33.6%; ▌ ✓ Robert S. Rose (Adams-Clay D-R) 22.7%; ▌William Thompson (Crawford Federalist) 19.1%; ▌John Price (Crawford Federalist) 13.9%; ▌Micah Brooks (Democratic-Republican) 10.6%; Others 0.1%
New York 27	None (new district)			New seat. Democratic-Republican gain.	▌ ✓ Moses Hayden (Adams-Clay D-R) 60.6%; ▌John H. Jones (Democratic-Republican) 39.3%; Others 0.1%
New York 28	William B. Rochester; Redistricted from the 20th district	Democratic- Republican	1821	Incumbent re-elected but resigned April 21, 1823, causing a special election.	▌ ✓ William B. Rochester (Adams-Clay D-R) 98.4%; Others 1.6%
New York 29	None (new district)			New seat. Democratic-Republican gain. Election was successfully challenged and a new winner was seated in 1824.	▌ ✓ Isaac Wilson (Adams-Clay D-R) 50.0%; ▌Parmenio Adams (Adams-Clay D-R) 49.6%; Others 0.4%
New York 30	Albert H. Tracy; Redistricted from the 22nd district	Democratic- Republican	1818	Incumbent re-elected.	▌ ✓ Albert H. Tracy (Adams-Clay D-R) 62.6%; ▌Augustus Porter (Democratic-Republican) 37.2%; Others 0.1%

== North Carolina ==
North Carolina's delegation remained unchanged after the census, at thirteen seats. North Carolina elected its members August 14, 1823, after the term began but before the new Congress convened.

District	Incumbent			This race	
District	Member	Party	First elected	Results	Candidates
North Carolina 1	Lemuel Sawyer	Democratic-Republican	1806; 1813 (lost); 1817	Incumbent lost re-election. Democratic-Republican hold.	▌ ✓ Alfred M. Gatlin (Crawford D-R) 52.9%; ▌Lemuel Sawyer (Democratic-Republican) 47.1%
North Carolina 2	Hutchins G. Burton	Democratic-Republican	1819	Incumbent re-elected.	▌ ✓ Hutchins G. Burton (Crawford D-R); ▌Jesse A. Dawson (Unknown)
North Carolina 3	Thomas H. Hall	Democratic-Republican	1817	Incumbent re-elected.	▌ ✓ Thomas H. Hall (Crawford D-R) 52.2%; ▌William Clark (Federalist) 47.8%
North Carolina 4	William S. Blackledge	Democratic-Republican	1821	Incumbent retired. Democratic-Republican hold.	▌ ✓ Richard Dobbs Spaight Jr. (Crawford D-R)
North Carolina 5	Charles Hooks	Democratic-Republican	1816 (special); 1817 (lost); 1819	Incumbent re-elected.	▌ ✓ Charles Hooks (Crawford D-R); ▌John D. Jones (Unknown)
North Carolina 6	Weldon N. Edwards	Democratic-Republican	1816 (special)	Incumbent re-elected.	▌ ✓ Weldon N. Edwards (Crawford D-R) 100%
North Carolina 7	Archibald McNeill	Federalist	1821	Incumbent retired. Federalist hold.	▌ ✓ John Culpepper (Adams-Clay Federalist) 50.9%; ▌Alexander McNeill (Unknown) 49.1%
North Carolina 8	Josiah Crudup	Democratic-Republican	1821	Incumbent retired. Democratic-Republican hold.	▌ ✓ Willie P. Mangum (Crawford D-R) 59.3%; ▌Daniel L. Barringer (Jackson D-R) 40.7%
North Carolina 9	Romulus M. Saunders	Democratic-Republican	1821	Incumbent re-elected.	▌ ✓ Romulus M. Saunders (Crawford D-R) 100%
North Carolina 10	John Long	Democratic-Republican	1821	Incumbent re-elected.	▌ ✓ John Long (Crawford D-R) 66.9%; ▌John MacClelland (Unknown) 33.1%
North Carolina 11	Henry W. Connor	Democratic-Republican	1821	Incumbent re-elected.	▌ ✓ Henry W. Connor (Jackson D-R) 60.7%; ▌William Davidson (Federalist) 39.3%
North Carolina 12	Felix Walker	Democratic-Republican	1817	Incumbent lost re-election. (Note: In Georgia's 12th district, incumbent Robert Brank Vance and challenger Felix Walker both received 1,913 votes. The sheriffs of the four counties in that district cast the tie-breaking votes. Three voted for Vance, and one for Walker, giving the seat to Vance.); Democratic-Republican hold.	▌ ✓ Robert Brank Vance (Jackson D-R) 37.5%; ▌Felix Walker (Democratic-Republican) 37.5%; ▌George Walton (Democratic-Republican) 15.6%; ▌Hodge Rabon (Democratic-Republican) 9.5%
North Carolina 13	Lewis Williams	Democratic-Republican	1815	Incumbent re-elected.	▌ ✓ Lewis Williams (Crawford D-R); ▌Montford Stakes (Democratic-Republican)

== Ohio ==
Ohio gained eight seats in reapportionment following the 1820 United States census. Ohio elected its members October 8, 1822.

District	Incumbent			This race	
District	Member	Party	First elected	Results	Candidates
Ohio 1	None (new district)			New seat. Democratic-Republican gain.	▌ ✓ James W. Gazlay (Jackson D-R) 52.8%; ▌William Henry Harrison (Adams-Clay D-R) 47.2%
Ohio 2	Thomas R. Ross; Redistricted from the 1st district	Democratic- Republican	1818	Incumbent re-elected.	▌ ✓ Thomas R. Ross (Crawford D-R) 100%
Ohio 3	None (new district)			New seat. Democratic-Republican gain.	▌ ✓ William McLean (Adams-Clay D-R) 28.8%; ▌Joseph H. Crane (Democratic-Republican) 26.1%; ▌William Blodget (Unknown) 14.5%; ▌Joseph L. Hawkins (Unknown) 13.0%; ▌Fielding Lowry (Unknown) 9.9%; ▌John Houtz (Unknown) 7.5%; Others 0.2%
Ohio 4	Joseph Vance; Redistricted from the 5th district	Democratic- Republican	1820	Incumbent re-elected.	▌ ✓ Joseph Vance (Adams-Clay D-R)
Ohio 5	John W. Campbell; Redistricted from the 2nd district	Democratic- Republican	1816	Incumbent re-elected.	▌ ✓ John Wilson Campbell (Jackson D-R)
Ohio 6	None (new district)			New seat. Democratic-Republican gain.	▌ ✓ Duncan McArthur (Adams-Clay D-R) 27.7%; ▌Henry Brush (Democratic-Republican) 19.2%; ▌Edward King (Unknown) 17.5%; ▌Caleb Atwater (Jackson D-R) 16.3%; ▌Richard Douglass (Unknown) 12.1%; ▌Thomas Scott (Unknown) 7.4%
Ohio 7	Levi Barber; Redistricted from the 3rd district	Democratic- Republican	1816; 1818 (lost); 1820	Incumbent lost re-election. Democratic-Republican hold.	▌ ✓ Samuel F. Vinton (Adams-Clay D-R) 47.0%; ▌Levi Barber (Democratic-Republican) 28.9%; ▌Robert Lucas (Democratic-Republican) 24.1%
Ohio 8	None (new district)			New seat. Democratic-Republican gain.	▌ ✓ William Wilson (Crawford D-R) 48.7%; ▌Orris Parish (Unknown) 23.1%; ▌James Kilbourne (Democratic-Republican) 15.6%; ▌Daniel S. Norton (Unknown) 9.9%; ▌William Stanbery (Unknown) 2.4%; ▌William Gavit (Unknown) 0.4%
Ohio 9	David Chambers; Redistricted from the 4th district	Democratic- Republican	1821 (special)	Incumbent lost re-election. Democratic-Republican hold.	▌ ✓ Philemon Beecher (Adams-Clay D-R) 37.6% (Note: Changed parties.); ▌David Chambers (Democratic-Republican) 34.3%; ▌Samuel Sullivan (Democratic-Republican) 18.0%; ▌William Trimble (Democratic-Republican) 10.1%
Ohio 10	None (new district)			New seat. Democratic-Republican gain.	▌ ✓ John Patterson (Adams-Clay D-R) 53.7%; ▌Charles Hammond (Federalist) 46.3%
Ohio 11	None (new district)			New seat. Democratic-Republican gain.	▌ ✓ John C. Wright (Adams-Clay D-R) 58.4%; ▌John MacLaughlin (Unknown) 41.5%; ▌John Kimmel (Unknown) 0.1%
Ohio 12	John Sloane; Redistricted from the 6th district	Democratic- Republican	1818	Incumbent re-elected.	▌ ✓ John Sloane (Adams-Clay D-R) 98.9%; ▌George M. Crane (Unknown) 1.1%
Ohio 13	None (new district)			New seat. Democratic-Republican gain.	▌ ✓ Elisha Whittlesey (Adams-Clay D-R) 37.3%; ▌Eli Baldwin (Unknown) 35.9%; ▌Nehemiah King (Unknown) 11.4%; ▌Samuel W. Phelps (Unknown) 10.9%; ▌Adamson Bentley (Unknown) 4.3%; Others 0.1%
Ohio 14	None (new district)			New seat. Democratic-Republican gain.	▌ ✓ Mordecai Bartley (Adams-Clay D-R) 55.6%; ▌Alfred Kelley (Unknown) 44.4%

== Pennsylvania ==
Pennsylvania gained three seats in reapportionment following the 1820 United States census. Pennsylvania elected its members October 8, 1822.

District	Incumbent			This race	
District	Member	Party	First elected	Results	Candidates
Pennsylvania 1	None (new district)			New seat. Federalist gain.	▌ ✓ Samuel Breck (Adams-Clay Federalist) 52.5%; ▌Joel B. Sutherland (Democratic-Republican) 43.3%; ▌Edward Heston (Democratic-Republican) 4.2%
Pennsylvania 2	Joseph Hemphill; Redistricted from the 1st district	Federalist	1800; 1802 (lost); 1818	Incumbent re-elected.	▌ ✓ Joseph Hemphill (Jackson Federalist) 60.8%; ▌George M. Dallas (Democratic-Republican) 36.7%; ▌William J. Duane (Democratic-Republican) 2.5%
Pennsylvania 3	Thomas Forrest; Redistricted from the 1st district	Federalist	1822 (special)	Incumbent lost re-election. Democratic-Republican gain.	▌ ✓ Daniel H. Miller (Jackson D-R) 64.0%; ▌Thomas Forrest (Federalist) 33.2%; ▌Adam Seybert (Democratic-Republican) 2.8%
Pennsylvania 4 Plural district with 3 seats	James Buchanan; Redistricted from the 3rd district	Federalist	1820	Incumbent re-elected.	▌ ✓ James Buchanan (Jackson Federalist) 18.6%; ▌ ✓ Isaac Wayne (Jackson Federalist) 18.2%; ▌ ✓ Samuel Edwards (Jackson Federalist) 18.1%; ▌William Darlington (Democratic-Republican) 15.2%; ▌William Anderson (Democratic-Republican) 15.0%; ▌Jacob Hibshman (Democratic-Republican) 14.9%
Pennsylvania 4 Plural district with 3 seats	William Darlington; Redistricted from the 2nd district	Democratic- Republican	1814; 1816 (lost); 1818	Incumbent lost re-election. Federalist gain.	▌ ✓ James Buchanan (Jackson Federalist) 18.6%; ▌ ✓ Isaac Wayne (Jackson Federalist) 18.2%; ▌ ✓ Samuel Edwards (Jackson Federalist) 18.1%; ▌William Darlington (Democratic-Republican) 15.2%; ▌William Anderson (Democratic-Republican) 15.0%; ▌Jacob Hibshman (Democratic-Republican) 14.9%
Pennsylvania 4 Plural district with 3 seats	Samuel Edwards; Redistricted from the 1st district	Federalist	1818	Incumbent re-elected.	▌ ✓ James Buchanan (Jackson Federalist) 18.6%; ▌ ✓ Isaac Wayne (Jackson Federalist) 18.2%; ▌ ✓ Samuel Edwards (Jackson Federalist) 18.1%; ▌William Darlington (Democratic-Republican) 15.2%; ▌William Anderson (Democratic-Republican) 15.0%; ▌Jacob Hibshman (Democratic-Republican) 14.9%
Pennsylvania 5	None (new district)			New seat. Democratic-Republican gain.	▌ ✓ Philip S. Markley (Jackson D-R) 52.5%; ▌John Hughes (Federalist) 47.5%
Pennsylvania 6	John Phillips; Redistricted from the 3rd district	Federalist	1820	Incumbent lost re-election. Democratic-Republican gain.	▌ ✓ Robert Harris (Jackson D-R) 54.6%; ▌John Phillips (Democratic-Republican) 45.4%
Pennsylvania 7 Plural district with 2 seats	Ludwig Worman	Federalist	1820	Incumbent lost re-election. Democratic-Republican gain. Incumbent then died October 17, 1822, and winner was also elected December 10, 1822, to begin term early.	▌ ✓ Daniel Udree (Jackson D-R) 28.9%; ▌ ✓ Henry Wilson (Jackson D-R) 27.4%; ▌Ludwig Worman (Federalist) 22.2%; ▌Peter Rhoads (Federalist) 21.5%
Pennsylvania 7 Plural district with 2 seats	None (new seat)			New seat. Democratic-Republican gain.	▌ ✓ Daniel Udree (Jackson D-R) 28.9%; ▌ ✓ Henry Wilson (Jackson D-R) 27.4%; ▌Ludwig Worman (Federalist) 22.2%; ▌Peter Rhoads (Federalist) 21.5%
Pennsylvania 8 Plural district with 2 seats	Samuel D. Ingham; Redistricted from the 6th district	Democratic- Republican	1822 (special)	Incumbent re-elected.	▌ ✓ Samuel D. Ingham (Jackson D-R) 34.7%; ▌ ✓ Thomas J. Rogers (Jackson D-R) 29.1%; ▌Samuel Sitgreaves (Federalist) 24.0%; ▌Francis B. Shaw (Federalist) 12.2%
Pennsylvania 8 Plural district with 2 seats	Thomas J. Rogers; Redistricted from the 6th district	Democratic- Republican	1818 (special)	Incumbent re-elected.	▌ ✓ Samuel D. Ingham (Jackson D-R) 34.7%; ▌ ✓ Thomas J. Rogers (Jackson D-R) 29.1%; ▌Samuel Sitgreaves (Federalist) 24.0%; ▌Francis B. Shaw (Federalist) 12.2%
Pennsylvania 9 Plural district with 3 seats	None (new district)			New seat. Federalist gain.	▌ ✓ William Cox Ellis (Jackson Federalist) 18.1%; ▌ ✓ Samuel McKean (Jackson D-R) 17.4%; ▌ ✓ George Kremer (Jackson D-R) 17.3%; ▌Joseph Wood (Democratic-Republican) 16.7%; ▌Henry Welles (Independent D-R) 15.0%; ▌Henry Yearwick (Independent D-R) 10.5%; ▌Ethan Baldwin (Independent D-R) 3.6%; ▌Nicholas Middlesworth (Democratic-Republican) 1.5%
Pennsylvania 9 Plural district with 3 seats	None (new district)			New seat. Democratic-Republican gain.	▌ ✓ William Cox Ellis (Jackson Federalist) 18.1%; ▌ ✓ Samuel McKean (Jackson D-R) 17.4%; ▌ ✓ George Kremer (Jackson D-R) 17.3%; ▌Joseph Wood (Democratic-Republican) 16.7%; ▌Henry Welles (Independent D-R) 15.0%; ▌Henry Yearwick (Independent D-R) 10.5%; ▌Ethan Baldwin (Independent D-R) 3.6%; ▌Nicholas Middlesworth (Democratic-Republican) 1.5%
Pennsylvania 9 Plural district with 3 seats	None (new district)			New seat. Democratic-Republican gain.	▌ ✓ William Cox Ellis (Jackson Federalist) 18.1%; ▌ ✓ Samuel McKean (Jackson D-R) 17.4%; ▌ ✓ George Kremer (Jackson D-R) 17.3%; ▌Joseph Wood (Democratic-Republican) 16.7%; ▌Henry Welles (Independent D-R) 15.0%; ▌Henry Yearwick (Independent D-R) 10.5%; ▌Ethan Baldwin (Independent D-R) 3.6%; ▌Nicholas Middlesworth (Democratic-Republican) 1.5%
Pennsylvania 10	James S. Mitchell; Redistricted from the 4th district	Democratic- Republican	1820	Incumbent re-elected.	▌ ✓ James S. Mitchell (Jackson D-R) 100%
Pennsylvania 11 Plural district with 2 seats	John Findlay; Redistricted from the 5th district	Democratic- Republican	1821 (special)	Incumbent re-elected.	▌ ✓ John Findlay (Jackson D-R) 27.0%; ▌ ✓ James Wilson (Jackson D-R) 25.3%; ▌James McSherry (Federalist) 24.2%; ▌William N. Irvine (Federalist) 23.6%
Pennsylvania 11 Plural district with 2 seats	James McSherry; Redistricted from the 5th district	Democratic- Republican	1820	Incumbent lost re-election. Democratic-Republican hold.	▌ ✓ John Findlay (Jackson D-R) 27.0%; ▌ ✓ James Wilson (Jackson D-R) 25.3%; ▌James McSherry (Federalist) 24.2%; ▌William N. Irvine (Federalist) 23.6%
Pennsylvania 12	John Brown; Redistricted from the 9th district	Democratic- Republican	1820	Incumbent re-elected.	▌ ✓ John Brown (Jackson D-R) 100%
Pennsylvania 13	John Tod; Redistricted from the 8th district	Democratic- Republican	1820	Incumbent re-elected.	▌ ✓ John Tod (Jackson D-R) 100%
Pennsylvania 14	Andrew Stewart; Redistricted from the 13th district	Democratic- Republican	1820	Incumbent re-elected.	▌ ✓ Andrew Stewart (Jackson D-R) 60.8%; ▌Joseph Houston (Independent D-R) 39.2%
Pennsylvania 15	Thomas Patterson; Redistricted from the 12th district	Democratic- Republican	1816	Incumbent re-elected.	▌ ✓ Thomas Patterson (Jackson D-R) 67.8%; ▌Walter Craig (Independent D-R) 32.2%
Pennsylvania 16 Plural district with 2 seats	Walter Forward; Redistricted from the 14th district	Democratic- Republican	1822 (special)	Incumbent re-elected.	▌ ✓ Walter Forward (Jackson D-R) 30.2%; ▌ ✓ James Allison Jr. (Jackson D-R) 28.2%; ▌John A. Scroggs (Independent D-R) 21.3%; ▌Joel Lewis (Independent D-R) 20.2%
Pennsylvania 16 Plural district with 2 seats	None (new seat)			New seat. Democratic-Republican gain.	▌ ✓ Walter Forward (Jackson D-R) 30.2%; ▌ ✓ James Allison Jr. (Jackson D-R) 28.2%; ▌John A. Scroggs (Independent D-R) 21.3%; ▌Joel Lewis (Independent D-R) 20.2%
Pennsylvania 17	George Plumer; Redistricted from the 11th district	Democratic- Republican	1820	Incumbent re-elected.	▌ ✓ George Plumer (Jackson D-R) 54.1%; ▌Alexander W. Foster (Independent D-R) 45.9%
Pennsylvania 18	Patrick Farrelly; Redistricted from the 15th district	Democratic- Republican	1820	Incumbent re-elected.	▌ ✓ Patrick Farrelly (Jackson D-R) 71.4%; ▌Samuel Williamson (Independent D-R) 28.6%

== Rhode Island ==
Rhode Island elected its members August 27, 1822.

District	Incumbent			This race	
District	Member	Party	First elected	Results	Candidates
Rhode Island at-large 2 seats on a general ticket	Samuel Eddy	Democratic-Republican	1818	Incumbent re-elected.	▌ ✓ Job Durfee (Adams-Clay D-R) 49.0%; ▌ ✓ Samuel Eddy (Adams-Clay D-R) 48.0%; Others 3.1%
Rhode Island at-large 2 seats on a general ticket	Job Durfee	Democratic-Republican	1820	Incumbent re-elected.	▌ ✓ Job Durfee (Adams-Clay D-R) 49.0%; ▌ ✓ Samuel Eddy (Adams-Clay D-R) 48.0%; Others 3.1%

== South Carolina ==
South Carolina elected its members February 12–13, 1823.

District	Incumbent			This race	
District	Member	Party	First elected	Results	Candidates
South Carolina 1	Joel R. Poinsett	Democratic- Republican	1820	Incumbent re-elected.	▌ ✓ Joel R. Poinsett (Jackson D-R) 59.5%; ▌William Crafts (Federalist) 39.1%; Others 1.4%
South Carolina 2	James Hamilton Jr.	Democratic- Republican	1822 (special)	Incumbent re-elected.	▌ ✓ James Hamilton Jr. (Jackson D-R) 97.9%; Others 2.1%
South Carolina 3	Thomas R. Mitchell	Democratic- Republican	1820	Incumbent lost re-election. Democratic-Republican hold.	▌ ✓ Robert B. Campbell (Jackson D-R) 56.3%; ▌Thomas R. Mitchell (Jackson D-R) 43.3%; Others 0.4%
South Carolina 4	Andrew R. Govan	Democratic- Republican	1822 (special)	Incumbent re-elected.	▌ ✓ Andrew R. Govan (Jackson D-R) 53.5%; ▌John M. Felder (Democratic-Republican) 46.3%; Others 0.2%
South Carolina 5	George McDuffie; Redistricted from the 6th district	Democratic- Republican	1820	Incumbent re-elected.	▌ ✓ George McDuffie (Jackson D-R) 63.2%; ▌Joseph Black (Democratic-Republican) 24.6%; ▌James Lomax (Unknown) 12.2%
South Carolina 6	John Wilson; Redistricted from the 7th district	Democratic- Republican	1820	Incumbent re-elected.	▌ ✓ John Wilson (Jackson D-R) 43.7%; ▌Warren R. Davis (Unknown) 37.3%; ▌Elias Earle (Democratic-Republican) 18.9%; Others 0.2%
South Carolina 7	Joseph Gist; Redistricted from the 8th district	Democratic- Republican	1820	Incumbent re-elected.	▌ ✓ Joseph Gist (Jackson D-R) 55.0%; ▌James McCreary (Adams-Clay D-R) 44.3%; Others 0.3%
South Carolina 8	John Carter; Redistricted from the 9th district	Democratic- Republican	1822 (special)	Incumbent re-elected.	▌ ✓ John Carter (Jackson D-R) 55.4%; ▌James G. Spann (Unknown) 44.3%; Others 0.3%
South Carolina 9	Starling Tucker; Redistricted from the 5th district	Democratic- Republican	1816	Incumbent re-elected.	▌ ✓ Starling Tucker (Jackson D-R) 61.4%; ▌William Strother (Unknown) 38.3%; Others 0.3%

== Tennessee ==
Tennessee gained three seats in reapportionment following the 1820 United States census. Tennessee elected its members August 7–8, 1823, after the term began but before the new Congress convened.

District	Incumbent			This race	
District	Member	Party	First elected	Results	Candidates
Tennessee 1	None (new district)			New seat. Democratic-Republican gain.	▌ ✓ John Blair (Jackson D-R) 52.5%; ▌John Tipton (Unknown) 47.5%
Tennessee 2	John Cocke	Democratic-Republican	1819	Incumbent re-elected.	▌ ✓ John Cocke (Jackson D-R) 100%
Tennessee 3	None (new district)			New seat. Democratic-Republican gain.	▌ ✓ James I. Standifer (Jackson D-R) 42.5%; ▌James C. Mitchell (Jackson D-R) 37.4%; ▌William Dunlap (Unknown) 20.1%
Tennessee 4	None (new district)			New seat. Democratic-Republican gain.	▌ ✓ Jacob C. Isacks (Jackson D-R) 65.2%; ▌James Rogers (Unknown) 34.8%
Tennessee 5	Robert Allen; Redistricted from the 4th district	Democratic-Republican	1819	Incumbent re-elected.	▌ ✓ Robert Allen (Jackson D-R) 99.8%; ▌Edward D. Trailer (Unknown) 0.2%
Tennessee 6	None (new district)			New seat. Democratic-Republican gain.	▌ ✓ James T. Sandford (Jackson D-R) 44.0%; ▌Andrew Erwin (Unknown) 31.0%; ▌Alfred M. Harris (Unknown) 25.1%
Tennessee 7	None (new district)			New seat. Democratic-Republican gain.	▌ ✓ Sam Houston (Jackson D-R) 99.9%; Others 0.1%
Tennessee 8	None (new district)			New seat. Democratic-Republican gain.	▌ ✓ James B. Reynolds (Jackson D-R) 46.4%; ▌Sterling Brewer (Unknown) 27.5%; ▌John H. Marable (Jackson D-R) 26.1%
Tennessee 9	None (new district)			New seat. Democratic-Republican gain.	▌ ✓ Adam R. Alexander (Jackson D-R) 43.7%; ▌James Terrill (Unknown) 30.8%; ▌William R. Hess (Unknown) 25.5%

== Vermont ==
Vermont lost one seat in reapportionment following the 1820 United States census. For the 1822 election, Vermont switched back to using a single at-large district. This would be the last year that Vermont would use an at-large district until 1932, when its representation was reduced to a single seat. Vermont elected its members September 3, 1822.

District	Incumbent			This race	
District	Member	Party	First elected	Results	Candidates
Vermont at-large 5 seats on a general ticket	Rollin C. Mallary; Redistricted from the 1st district	Democratic- Republican	1818	Incumbent re-elected.	▌ ✓ Rollin C. Mallary (Adams-Clay D-R) 18.8%; ▌ ✓ Samuel C. Crafts (Adams-Clay D-R) 17.2%; ▌ ✓ Charles Rich (Adams-Clay D-R) 14.8%; ▌ ✓ D. Azro A. Buck (Adams-Clay D-R) 11.0%; ▌ ✓ William C. Bradley (Adams-Clay D-R) 10.7%; ▌John Mattocks (Democratic-Republican) 7.4%; ▌Elias Keyes (Democratic-Republican) 6.2%; ▌Steven Haight Jr. (Democratic-Republican) 4.1%; ▌Phineas White (Democratic-Republican) 3.2%; ▌Orsamus Cook Merrill (Democratic-Republican) 61.3%; ▌Horace Everett (Democratic-Republican) 1.1%; ▌Heman Allen (Democratic-Republican) 0.9%; Others 1.5%
Vermont at-large 5 seats on a general ticket	Phineas White; Redistricted from the 2nd district	Democratic- Republican	1821	Incumbent lost re-election. Democratic-Republican hold.	
Vermont at-large 5 seats on a general ticket	Charles Rich; Redistricted from the 3rd district	Democratic- Republican	1812; 1814 (lost); 1816	Incumbent re-elected.	
Vermont at-large 5 seats on a general ticket	Elias Keyes; Redistricted from the 4th district	Democratic- Republican	1820	Incumbent lost re-election. Democratic-Republican hold.	
Vermont at-large 5 seats on a general ticket	Samuel C. Crafts; Redistricted from the 5th district	Democratic- Republican	1816	Incumbent re-elected.	
Vermont at-large 5 seats on a general ticket	John Mattocks; Redistricted from the 6th district	Democratic- Republican	1820	Incumbent lost re-election. Seat eliminated. Democratic-Republican loss.	

== Virginia ==
Virginia lost one seat in reapportionment following the 1820 United States census. Nineteen incumbents ran for re-election leaving three open seats. Virginia elected its members in April 1823, after the term began but before the new Congress convened.

District	Incumbent			This race	
District	Member	Party	First elected	Results	Candidates
Virginia 1	Thomas Newton Jr. Redistricted from the 21st district	Democratic-Republican	1797	Incumbent re-elected.	▌ ✓ Thomas Newton Jr. (Adams-Clay D-R); ▌George Loyall (Democratic-Republican)
Virginia 2	Arthur Smith; Redistricted from the 20th district	Democratic-Republican	1821	Incumbent re-elected.	▌ ✓ Arthur Smith (Crawford D-R)
Virginia 3	William S. Archer; Redistricted from the 17th district	Democratic-Republican	1820 (special)	Incumbent re-elected.	▌ ✓ William S. Archer (Crawford D-R) 100%
Virginia 4	Mark Alexander; Redistricted from the 18th district	Democratic-Republican	1819	Incumbent re-elected.	▌ ✓ Mark Alexander (Crawford D-R)
Virginia 5	John Randolph; Redistricted from the 16th district	Democratic-Republican	1797; 1819	Incumbent re-elected.	▌ ✓ John Randolph (Crawford D-R) 100%
Virginia 6	George Tucker; Redistricted from the 15th district	Democratic-Republican	1819	Incumbent re-elected.	▌ ✓ George Tucker (Crawford D-R) 100%
Virginia 7	Jabez Leftwich; Redistricted from the 14th district	Democratic-Republican	1821	Incumbent re-elected.	▌ ✓ Jabez Leftwich (Crawford D-R) 56.1%; ▌Nathaniel H. Claiborne (Democratic-Republican) 43.9%
Virginia 8	Burwell Bassett; Redistricted from the 13th district	Democratic-Republican	1805; 1812 (lost); 1815; 1819 (retired); 1821	Incumbent re-elected.	▌ ✓ Burwell Bassett (Crawford D-R) 58.2%; ▌Abel P. Upshur (Federalist) 41.5%; Others 0.3%
Virginia 9	Andrew Stevenson; Redistricted from the 23rd district	Democratic-Republican	1821	Incumbent re-elected.	▌ ✓ Andrew Stevenson (Crawford D-R) 100%
Virginia 10	None (new district)			New seat. Democratic-Republican gain.	▌ ✓ William C. Rives (Crawford D-R) 100%
Virginia 11	Philip P. Barbour	Democratic-Republican	1814 (special)	Incumbent re-elected.	▌ ✓ Philip P. Barbour (Crawford D-R)
Virginia 12	Robert S. Garnett	Democratic-Republican	1817	Incumbent re-elected.	▌ ✓ Robert S. Garnett (Crawford D-R) 75.3%; ▌Edwin Upshaw (Federalist) 24.7%
Virginia 13	William Lee Ball; Redistricted from the 9th district	Democratic-Republican	1817	Incumbent re-elected.	▌ ✓ William Lee Ball (Crawford D-R); ▌John Clowning (Unknown); ▌Ellyson Currie (Unknown); ▌John W. Hungerford (Democratic-Republican)
Virginia 14	Charles F. Mercer; Redistricted from the 8th district	Federalist	1817	Incumbent re-elected as a Democratic-Republican. Democratic-Republican gain.	▌ ✓ Charles F. Mercer (Crawford D-R) 51.8%; ▌Sydnor Bailey (Democratic-Republican) 48.2%
Virginia 15	None (new district)			New seat. Democratic-Republican gain.	▌ ✓ John S. Barbour (Crawford D-R) 43.8%; ▌Thomas Marshall (Federalist) 17.8%; ▌Thomas Brown (Democratic-Republican) 15.6%
Virginia 16	James Stephenson; Redistricted from the 2nd district	Federalist	1803; 1805 (lost); 1809; 1811 (lost); 1822 (special)	Incumbent re-elected.	▌ ✓ James Stephenson (Crawford Federalist) 98.9%; Others 1.1%
Virginia 17	Jared Williams; Redistricted from the 3rd district	Democratic-Republican	1819	Incumbent re-elected.	▌ ✓ Jared Williams (Crawford D-R) 49.2%; ▌Alfred H. Powell (Federalist) 40.1%; ▌Samuel Kercheval (Democratic-Republican) 10.7%
Virginia 18	None (new district)			New seat. Democratic-Republican gain.	▌ ✓ Joseph Johnson (Jackson D-R) 58.2%; ▌Philip Doddridge (Federalist) 38.3%; ▌Edwin S. Duncan (Democratic-Republican) 2.5%; ▌Jeremiah Browning (Democratic-Republican) 1.0%
Virginia 19	William McCoy; Redistricted from the 4th district	Democratic-Republican	1811	Incumbent re-elected.	▌ ✓ William McCoy (Crawford D-R) 100%
Virginia 20	John Floyd; Redistricted from the 5th district	Democratic-Republican	1817	Incumbent re-elected.	▌ ✓ John Floyd (Crawford D-R)
Virginia 21	William Smith; Redistricted from the 7th district	Democratic-Republican	1821	Incumbent re-elected.	▌ ✓ William Smith (Crawford D-R) 55.5%; ▌James M. H. Beale (Democratic-Republican) 31.6%; ▌Isaac Morris (Democratic-Republican) 8.8%; ▌Robert Bailey (Democratic-Republican) 3.1%; ▌John Haymond (Democratic-Republican) 1.0%
Virginia 22	Alexander Smyth; Redistricted from the 6th district	Democratic-Republican	1817	Incumbent re-elected.	▌ ✓ Alexander Smyth (Crawford D-R) 55.6%; ▌Benjamin Estill (Federalist) 44.4%

== Non-voting delegates ==
There were three territories with the right to send delegates to the 18th Congress.

District	Incumbent			This race	
District	Delegate	Party	First elected	Results	Candidates
Arkansas Territory at-large	James Woodson Bates	None	1819	Incumbent retired.	▌ ✓ Henry W. Conway (Democratic-Republican) 58.4%; ▌William Bradford (Unknown) 41.4%
Florida Territory at-large	New seat			Territory was organized March 30, 1822, and granted the right to send a delegate. New member elected September 30, 1822. Successor seated January 23, 1823 as the first Hispanic American in Congress. Was not re-elected to the next term.	▌ ✓ Joseph M. Hernández (Democratic-Republican) 72.5%; ▌William Barnett (Unknown) 27.5%
Florida Territory at-large	Joseph M. Hernández	Democratic- Republican	1822	Incumbent lost re-election. Democratic-Republican hold.	▌ ✓ Richard K. Call (Democratic-Republican) 48.0%; ▌Joseph M. Hernández (Democratic-Republican) 24.4%; ▌Alexander Hamilton (Unknown) 24.1%; ▌Farquhar Bethune (Unknown) 3.5%
Michigan Territory at-large	Solomon Sibley	Unknown	1820 (special)	Incumbent retired. New member elected in 1823.	▌ ✓ Gabriel Richard (Independent) 28.1%; ▌John Biddle (Jackson D-R) 26.6%; ▌Austin E. Wing (Democratic-Republican) 21.2%; ▌Andrew G. Whitney (Unknown) 10.4%; ▌James MacCloskey (Unknown) 10.4%; ▌John R. Williams (Unknown) 3.2%

== See also ==
- 1822 United States elections
  - List of United States House of Representatives elections (1789–1822)
  - 1822–23 United States Senate elections
- 17th United States Congress
- 18th United States Congress

== Bibliography ==
- "A New Nation Votes: American Election Returns 1787-1825". Tufts Digital Library, Tufts University. Archived from the original on January 29, 2015.
- Dubin, Michael J. (March 1, 1998). United States Congressional Elections, 1788-1997: The Official Results of the Elections of the 1st Through 105th Congresses. McFarland and Company. ISBN 978-0786402830.
- Martis, Kenneth C. (January 1, 1989). The Historical Atlas of Political Parties in the United States Congress, 1789-1989. Macmillan Publishing Company. ISBN 978-0029201701.
- "Party Divisions of the House of Representatives* 1789–Present". Office of the Historian, United States House of Representatives.
- Mapping Early American Elections project team (2019). "Mapping Early American Elections". Roy Rosenzweig Center for History and New Media, George Mason University.
