= List of elections in 1822 =

The following elections occurred in the year 1822.

== Europe ==
- 1822 Spanish general election
- 1822 Portuguese legislative election

== North America ==
=== United States ===
- 1822 United States elections

==== United States Senate ====
- 1822 and 1823 United States Senate elections

==== United States House of Representatives ====
- 1822 and 1823 United States House of Representatives elections
- 1822 United States House of Representatives election in Arkansas Territory
- 1822 United States House of Representatives election in Delaware
- 1822 Delaware's at-large congressional district special election
- 1822 United States House of Representatives election in Florida Territory
- 1822 United States House of Representatives election in Georgia
- 1822 United States House of Representatives election in Illinois
- 1822 United States House of Representatives elections in Indiana
- 1822 Indiana's at-large congressional district special election
- 1822 United States House of Representatives elections in Kentucky
- 1822 United States House of Representatives elections in Louisiana
- 1822 Maine's 2nd congressional district special election
- 1822 United States House of Representatives elections in Maryland
- 1822–1823 United States House of Representatives elections in Massachusetts
- 1823 United States House of Representatives election in Michigan Territory
- 1822 United States House of Representatives election in Mississippi
- 1822 United States House of Representatives election in Missouri
- 1822–1823 United States House of Representatives election in New Hampshire
- 1822 United States House of Representatives election in New Jersey
- 1822 United States House of Representatives elections in New York
- 1822 New York's 9th congressional district special election
- 1822 United States House of Representatives elections in Ohio
- 1822 United States House of Representatives elections in Pennsylvania
- 1822 Pennsylvania's 1st congressional district special election
- 1822 Pennsylvania's 6th congressional district special election
- 1822 Pennsylvania's 7th congressional district special election
- 1822 Pennsylvania's 14th congressional district special election
- 1822 United States House of Representatives election in Rhode Island
- 1823 United States House of Representatives elections in South Carolina
- 1822 South Carolina's 2nd congressional district special election
- 1822 South Carolina's 4th congressional district special election
- 1822 South Carolina's 9th congressional district special election
- 1822 United States House of Representatives election in Vermont
- 1822 Virginia's 2nd congressional district special election

==== United States lieutenant gubernatorial ====
- 1822 Connecticut lieutenant gubernatorial election
- 1822 Illinois lieutenant gubernatorial election

==== United States gubernatorial ====
- 1822 Connecticut gubernatorial election
- 1822 Delaware gubernatorial special election
- 1822 Illinois gubernatorial election
- 1822 Indiana gubernatorial election
- 1822 Maine gubernatorial election
- 1822 Maryland gubernatorial election
- 1822 Massachusetts gubernatorial election
- 1822 New Hampshire gubernatorial election
- 1822 New Jersey gubernatorial election
- 1822 New York gubernatorial election
- 1822 North Carolina gubernatorial election
- 1822 Ohio gubernatorial election
- 1822 Rhode Island gubernatorial election
- 1822 South Carolina gubernatorial election
- 1822 Vermont gubernatorial election
- 1822 Virginia gubernatorial election

==== United States mayoral elections ====
- 1822 Boston mayoral election

== See also ==
- Category:1822 elections
