= 1822 Maine's 2nd congressional district special election =

The 1822 special election for Maine's 2nd congressional district was to select the successor for Representative Ezekiel Whitman (F), who resigned from his position on June 1, 1822. Mark Harris won the election, and took his seat on December 2, 1822.

== Election results ==
Candidate	Party	Votes	Percent
Mark Harris	Democratic-Republican	1,385	55.5%
George Bradbury	Federalist	1,042	41.8%
Woodbury Storer	Democratic-Republican	67	2.7%

== See also ==
- List of special elections to the United States House of Representatives
- 1822 and 1823 United States House of Representatives elections
- List of United States representatives from Maine
