= Senator Merwin =

Senator Merwin may refer to:

- Orange Merwin (1777–1853), Connecticut State Senate
- Samuel E. Merwin (1831–1907), Connecticut State Senate
