= Senator Bradbury (disambiguation) =

James W. Bradbury (1802–1901) was a U.S. Senator from Maine from 1847 to 1853. Senator Bradbury may also refer to:

- Bill Bradbury (born 1949), Oregon State Senate
- George Bradbury (American politician) (1770–1823), Maine State Senate
- Theophilus Bradbury (1739–1803), Massachusetts State Senate
