= 1823 Maryland's 5th congressional district special elections =

Special elections were held in Maryland's 5th congressional district on January 1, 1823, to fill vacancies in the 17th and 18th Congresses caused by the resignation of Samuel Smith (DR) after being elected to the Senate. Smith had been re-elected to the House in October. His resignation therefore created vacancies both in the remainder of the 17th Congress and in the 18th Congress.

== Election to the 17th Congress ==
Candidate	Party	Votes	Percent
Isaac McKim	Jacksonian Republican	2,656	37.7%
William H. Winder		2,577	36.6%
John Barney	Democratic-Republican	1,809	25.7%

McKim took his seat on January 8, 1823

== Election to the 18th Congress ==
Candidate	Party	Votes	Percent
Isaac McKim	Jacksonian Republican	2,625	37.5%
William H. Winder		2,563	36.6%
John Barney	Democratic-Republican	1,805	25.8%

== See also ==
- List of special elections to the United States House of Representatives
