= Massachusetts's 15th congressional district =

Obsolete district in Massachusetts, US

- Obsolete district
- Created: 1803; 1910
- Eliminated: 1820; 1940
- Years active: 1803–1821; 1913–1943

Massachusetts's current districts, since 2013

Massachusetts's 15th congressional district is an obsolete district that was first active 1803–1821 in the District of Maine, and again active 1913–1943 in Southeastern Massachusetts. It was last eliminated in 1943 after the 1940 census. Its last congressman was Charles L. Gifford, who was redistricted into the ninth district.

== Cities and towns in the district ==
=== 1910s ===
"Bristol County: Cities of Fall River, Taunton, and Attleboro, and towns of Berkley, Dighton, Freetown, Mansfield, North Attleboro, Norton, Raynham, Rehoboth, Seekonk, Somerset, Swansea, and Westport. Plymouth County: Town of Lakeville."

== List of members representing the district ==
Representative	Party	Years	Cong ress	Electoral history	District location
District created March 4, 1803
Peleg Wadsworth (Portland)	Federalist	March 4, 1803 – March 3, 1807	8th 9th	Redistricted from the 13th district and re-elected in 1802. Re-elected in 1804. Retired.	1803–1813 "Cumberland district," District of Maine
Daniel Ilsley (Falmouth)	Democratic-Republican	March 4, 1807 – March 3, 1809	10th	Elected in 1806. Lost re-election.	1803–1813 "Cumberland district," District of Maine
Ezekiel Whitman (Portland)	Federalist	March 4, 1809 – March 3, 1811	11th	Elected in 1808. Lost re-election.	1803–1813 "Cumberland district," District of Maine
William Widgery (Portland)	Democratic-Republican	March 4, 1811 – March 3, 1813	12th	Elected April 1, 1811 on the second ballot. Lost re-election.	1803–1813 "Cumberland district," District of Maine
George Bradbury (Portland)	Federalist	March 4, 1813 – March 3, 1817	13th 14th	Elected in 1812. Re-elected in 1814. Retired.	1813–1821 "2nd Eastern district," District of Maine
Ezekiel Whitman (Portland)	Federalist	March 4, 1817 – March 3, 1821	15th 16th	Elected in 1816. Re-elected in 1818. District moved to Maine's 2nd district.	1813–1821 "2nd Eastern district," District of Maine
District moved to Maine – March 3, 1821
District restored in Massachusetts – March 4, 1913
William S. Greene (Fall River)	Republican	March 4, 1913 – September 22, 1924	63rd 64th 65th 66th 67th 68th	Redistricted from the 13th district and re-elected in 1912. Re-elected in 1914. Re-elected in 1916. Re-elected in 1918. Re-elected in 1920. Re-elected in 1922. Died.	1913–1923 [data missing]
William S. Greene (Fall River)	Republican	March 4, 1913 – September 22, 1924	63rd 64th 65th 66th 67th 68th	Redistricted from the 13th district and re-elected in 1912. Re-elected in 1914. Re-elected in 1916. Re-elected in 1918. Re-elected in 1920. Re-elected in 1922. Died.	1923–1933 [data missing]
Vacant		September 22, 1924 – November 4, 1924	68th		1923–1933 [data missing]
Robert M. Leach (Taunton)	Republican	November 4, 1924 – March 3, 1925	68th	Elected to finish Greene's term. Retired.	1923–1933 [data missing]
Joseph W. Martin Jr. (North Attleborough)	Republican	March 4, 1925 – March 3, 1933	68th 69th 70th 71st 72nd	Elected in 1924. Re-elected in 1926. Re-elected in 1928. Re-elected in 1930. Redistricted to the 14th district.	1923–1933 [data missing]
Charles L. Gifford (Cotuit)	Republican	March 4, 1933 – January 3, 1943	73rd 74th 75th 76th 77th	Redistricted from the 14th district and re-elected in 1932. Re-elected in 1934. Re-elected in 1936. Re-elected in 1938. Re-elected in 1940. Redistricted to the 9th district.	1933–1943 [data missing]
District eliminated January 3, 1943
