= Daniel Ilsley =

American politician (1740–1813)

Member of the U.S. House of Representatives from Massachusetts's 15th district
- In office March 4, 1807 – March 3, 1809
- Preceded by: Peleg Wadsworth
- Succeeded by: Ezekiel Whitman

Personal details
- Born: May 30, 1740 Falmouth, Massachusetts Bay, British America (now Maine)
- Died: May 10, 1813 (aged 72) Portland, Massachusetts, U.S. (now Maine)
- Party: Democratic-Republican
- Occupation: Merchant

Daniel Ilsley (May 30, 1740 – May 10, 1813) was a U.S. representative from Massachusetts.

Born in Falmouth in Massachusetts Bay's Province of Maine, Ilsley received a liberal schooling. He became a distiller and was also interested in shipping. He served as a member of the committee of correspondence and safety. Major and mustering officer at Falmouth, during the Revolutionary War. He served as a delegate to the Massachusetts State convention in 1788 that adopted the Federal Constitution. He served as a member of the Massachusetts House of Representatives in 1793 and 1794.

Ilsley was elected as a Democratic-Republican to the Tenth Congress (March 4, 1807 – March 3, 1809). He was an unsuccessful candidate for reelection in 1808 to the Eleventh Congress. He died in Portland in Massachusetts' District of Maine on May 10, 1813. He was interred in the Eastern Cemetery in Portland.

== Sources ==
- United States Congress. "Daniel Ilsley (id: I000009)". Biographical Directory of the United States Congress.

U.S. House of Representatives
Preceded by Peleg Wadsworth	Member of the U.S. House of Representatives from Massachusetts's 15th congressional district 1807-1809	Succeeded by Ezekiel Whitman
