= 1822 Maine gubernatorial election =

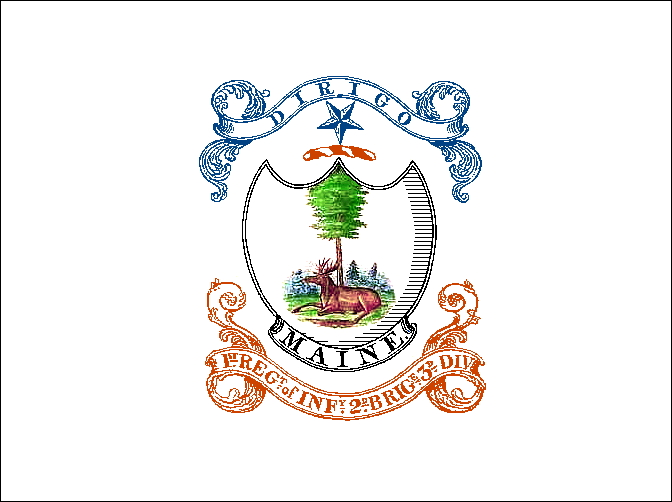
- September 9, 1822
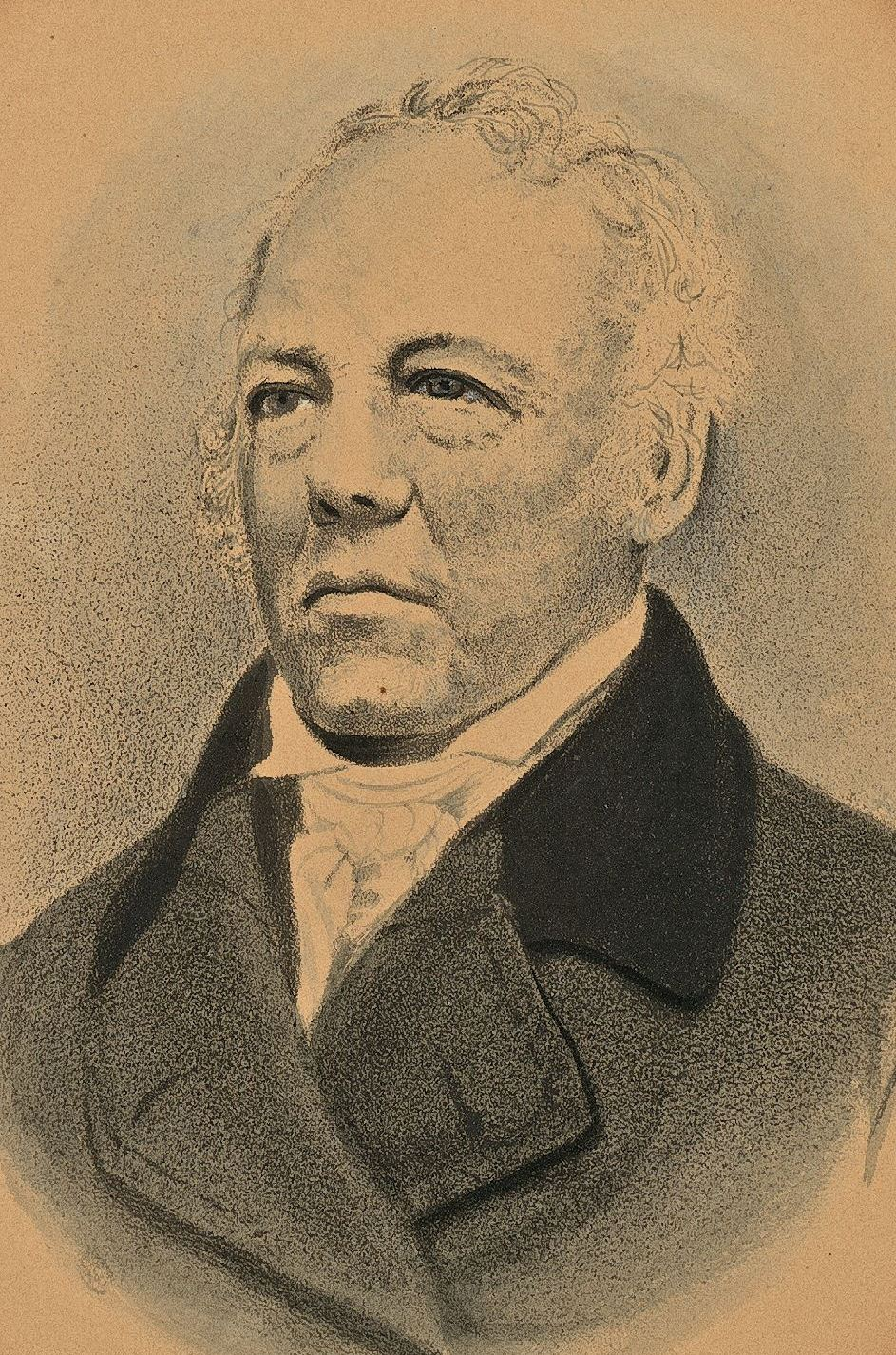

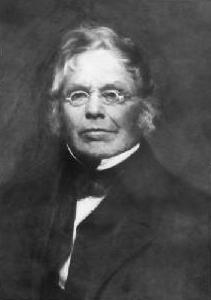
Nominee	Albion Parris	Ezekiel Whitman
Party	Democratic-Republican	Federalist
Popular vote	15,476	5,795
Percentage	69.77%	26.13%
- County results Parris: 50–60% 60–70% 70–80% 80–90%
Governor before election
Albion Parris
Democratic-Republican
Elected Governor
Albion Parris
Democratic-Republican

The 1822 Maine gubernatorial election took place on September 9, 1822. Incumbent Democratic-Republican Governor Albion Parris won re-election to a second term. The election was a repeat of the 1821 gubernatorial race in which he defeated Federalist candidate Ezekiel Whitman and Democratic-Republican Joshua Wingate, Jr.

== Results ==
=== Candidates ===
- Albion Parris, incumbent governor, former Judge on the United States District Court for the District of Maine, former U.S. representative (Democratic-Republican)
- Joshua Wingate, Jr. (Democratic-Republican)
- Ezekiel Whitman, former U.S. representative (Federalist)

1822 Maine gubernatorial election
Party	Candidate	Votes	%
Democratic-Republican	Albion Parris (incumbent)	15,476	69.77%
Federalist	Ezekiel Whitman	5,795	26.13%
Democratic-Republican	Joshua Wingate, Jr.	755	3.40%
Write-in		154	0.69%
Majority		9,681	43.64%
Total votes		22,180	100.00%
Democratic-Republican hold			

== Aftermath ==
This election marked the last time that the Federalists ran a candidate for governor. By 1825, the Federalist party no longer existed as an entity in the state. Following the pattern of other states during the Era of Good Feelings, the Democratic-Republicans would operate unoppposed as the only political organization until 1829.
