= Ebenezer Young =

American politician

Member of the U.S. House of Representatives from Connecticut's at-large district
- In office March 4, 1829 – March 3, 1835
- Preceded by: Orange Merwin
- Succeeded by: Lancelot Phelps

6th Speaker of the Connecticut House of Representatives
- In office 1827–1828
- Preceded by: Samuel A. Foot
- Succeeded by: Elisha Phelps

Personal details
- Born: December 25, 1783 Killingly, Connecticut
- Died: August 18, 1851 (aged 67) West Killingly, Connecticut
- Party: Federalist (1810–1817); National Republican (1827–1833)
- Education: Yale College
- Occupation: Attorney, manufacturer

Ebenezer Young (December 25, 1783 – August 18, 1851) was a United States representative from Connecticut. He was born in Killingly, Connecticut and graduated from Yale College in 1806. He studied law and was admitted to the bar and commenced practice in Danielson, Connecticut. In addition, he engaged in the manufacture of cloth at East Killingly, Connecticut.

Young was elected as a Federalist to the Connecticut House of Representatives in 1810, 1811, 1816, and 1817. He served in the Connecticut Senate 1823–1825 and was again a member of the Connecticut House of Representatives 1826–1828, serving as speaker in 1827 and 1828. He was elected to the Twenty-first, Twenty-second, and Twenty-third Congresses (March 4, 1829 – March 3, 1835) and served as chairman, Committee on Expenditures on Public Buildings (Twenty-second Congress). He died in West Killingly, Connecticut in 1851 and was buried in Westfield Cemetery, Danielson, Connecticut.

U.S. House of Representatives
Preceded by Orange Merwin	Member of the U.S. House of Representatives from Connecticut's at-large congressional district March 4, 1829 – March 3, 1835	Succeeded by Lancelot Phelps
