= William Widgery =

American politician (1753–1822)

Member of the U.S. House of Representatives from Massachusetts's 15th district
- In office March 4, 1811 – March 3, 1813
- Preceded by: Ezekiel Whitman
- Succeeded by: George Bradbury

Personal details
- Born: c. 1753 Devon, England, Great Britain
- Died: July 31, 1822 (aged 68–69) Portland, Maine, U.S.
- Party: Democratic-Republican
- Occupation: Lawyer

William Widgery (c. 1753 – July 31, 1822) was a U.S. representative from Massachusetts.

Born in Devonshire, England, in the Kingdom of Great Britain, Widgery immigrated to America with his parents, who settled in Philadelphia. He attended the common schools. He engaged in shipbuilding. He served in the Revolutionary War as a lieutenant on a privateer. He studied law. He was admitted to the bar and commenced practice in Portland in Massachusetts' District of Maine, about 1790. He served as member of the Massachusetts House of Representatives 1787–1793 and 1795–1797. He served as delegate to the state constitutional convention in 1788. He served in the state Senate in 1794, and ran for Massachusetts's 13th congressional district that year. He served as member of the executive council in 1806 and 1807.

Widgery was elected as a Democratic-Republican to the Twelfth Congress (March 4, 1811 – March 3, 1813), but was defeated for reelection in 1812 by George Bradbury He served as judge of the court of common pleas 1813–1821. He died in Portland, Maine, July 31, 1822. He was interred in the Eastern Cemetery in the Munjoy Hill neighborhood of Portland, Maine.

Widgery Wharf was built and owned by the Widgery family during William Widgery's early life.

U.S. House of Representatives
Preceded by Ezekiel Whitman	Member of the U.S. House of Representatives from Massachusetts's 15th congressional district 1811-1813	Succeeded by George Bradbury
