= 1823 New York's 28th congressional district special election =

On April 21, 1823, William B. Rochester (DR) of New York's 28th district was appointed judge of the Eighth Circuit Court and resigned his seat in the House. A special election was held to fill the resulting vacancy.

== Election results ==
Candidate	Party	Votes	Percent
William Woods	Democratic-Republican	834	51.4%
Daniel Cruger	Democratic-Republican	789	48.6%

Woods took his seat on December 1, 1823, at the start of the 1st Session of the 18th Congress.

== See also ==
- List of special elections to the United States House of Representatives
