= 1822 Pennsylvania's 1st congressional district special election =

On May 8, 1822, the last day of the First Session of the 17th Congress, William Milnor (F) of Pennsylvania's 1st district resigned. A special election was held to fill the resulting vacancy on October 1, 1822, a week before the general elections for the 18th Congress.

== Election results ==
Candidate	Party	Votes	Percent
Thomas Forrest	Federalist	5,977	50.0%
Daniel H. Miller	Democratic-Republican	5,976	50.0%

Forrest took his seat December 2, 1822

== See also ==
- List of special elections to the United States House of Representatives
