= Lemuel Whitman =

American politician (1780–1841)

Member of the U.S. House of Representatives from Connecticut's at-large district
- In office March 4, 1823 – March 3, 1825
- Preceded by: John Russ
- Succeeded by: Orange Merwin

Personal details
- Born: June 8, 1780 Farmington, Connecticut
- Died: November 13, 1841 (aged 61) Farmington, Connecticut
- Party: Adams–Clay Republican
- Education: Litchfield Law School
- Occupation: Attorney

Lemuel Whitman (June 8, 1780 – November 13, 1841) was a United States representative from Connecticut. He was born in Farmington, Connecticut where he completed preparatory studies. He graduated from Yale College in 1800 and taught in a seminary in Bermuda in 1801. Later, he studied law and graduated from the Litchfield Law School. He was admitted to the bar and commenced practice in Farmington.

Whitman was appointed judge of the superior court in 1818. associate judge of the Hartford County Court 1819-1821, and chief judge 1821-1823. He was one of a committee of three to prepare a revision of the statutes of the Connecticut in 1821. He was a member of the Connecticut Senate in 1822 and elected as an Adams-Clay Republican candidate to the Eighteenth Congress (March 4, 1823 – March 3, 1825). After leaving Congress, he resumed the practice of law and served as a member of the Connecticut House of Representatives in 1831 and 1832. He died in Farmington, Connecticut in 1841.

U.S. House of Representatives
| Preceded by John Russ | Member of the U.S. House of Representatives from Connecticut's at-large congressional district March 4, 1823 – March 3, 1825 | Succeeded by Orange Merwin |
