= 1822 Connecticut lieutenant gubernatorial election =

- April 1, 1822
Nominee	Jonathan Ingersoll
Party	Toleration
Popular vote	5,956
Percentage	91.60%
- Ingersoll: 40–50% 50–60% 60–70% 70–80% 80–90% 90–100% Shuman: 50–60% No Data/Vote
Lieutenant Governor before election
Jonathan Ingersoll
Toleration
Elected Lieutenant Governor
Jonathan Ingersoll
Toleration

The 1822 Connecticut lieutenant gubernatorial election was held on April 1, 1822, in order to elect the lieutenant governor of Connecticut. Incumbent Toleration lieutenant governor Jonathan Ingersoll won re-election as he ran with minimal opposition.

== General election ==
On election day, April 1, 1822, incumbent Toleration lieutenant governor Jonathan Ingersoll won re-election with 91.60% of the vote, thereby retaining Toleration control over the office of lieutenant governor. Ingersoll was sworn in for his seventh term on May 1, 1822.

=== Results ===
Connecticut lieutenant gubernatorial election, 1822
Party	Candidate	Votes	%
Toleration	Jonathan Ingersoll (incumbent)	5,956	91.60
	Scattering	555	8.40
Total votes		6,511	100.00
Toleration hold			
