= 1821 South Carolina's 9th congressional district special election =

In 1821, Representative-elect John S. Richards (DR), who'd been elected to represent South Carolina's 9th district, declined to serve. A special election was held to fill the resulting, the first of two special elections in the 9th district for the 17th Congress.

== Election results ==
Candidate	Party	Votes	Percent
James Blair	Democratic-Republican	1,116	49.1%
Joseph Brevard	Democratic-Republican	991	43.6%
James C. Postell		165	7.3%

Blair took his seat at the start of the 17th Congress. Blair himself subsequently resigned May 8, 1822, resulting in a second special election.

== See also ==
- List of special elections to the United States House of Representatives
