= John Russ (politician) =

American politician (1767–1833)

Member of the U.S. House of Representatives from Connecticut's at-large district
- In office March 4, 1819 – March 3, 1823
- Preceded by: Timothy Pitkin
- Succeeded by: Lemuel Whitman

Personal details
- Born: October 29, 1767 Ipswich, Massachusetts, United States
- Died: June 22, 1833 (aged 65) Hartford, Connecticut, United States
- Party: Democratic-Republican

John Russ (October 29, 1767 – June 22, 1833) was a United States representative from Connecticut.

Born in the small Massachusetts town of Ipswich, Russ completed his preparatory studies and then moved to Hartford, Connecticut where he engaged in mercantile pursuits.

Russ was elected to the Sixteenth and Seventeenth Congresses (March 4, 1819 - March 3, 1823). He was not a candidate for reelection in 1823 and was an unsuccessful candidate for election in 1823 to the Connecticut State House of Representatives. He was elected to the State house of representatives in 1824 and then elected as a judge of the Hartford Probate Court in 1824 and served until 1830.

He died in Hartford, aged 65, and was buried in the Old North Cemetery.

U.S. House of Representatives
Preceded by Timothy Pitkin	Member of the U.S. House of Representatives from Connecticut's at-large congressional district 1819–1823	Succeeded by Lemuel Whitman
