= 1822 Delaware's at-large congressional district special election =

A special election was held in Delaware's at-large congressional district on October 1, 1822 to fill a vacancy left by the resignation of Caesar A. Rodney (DR) on January 24, 1822, having been elected to the Senate. This election was held on the same day as the general elections for Congress in Delaware.

== Election results ==
Candidate	Party	Votes	Percent
Daniel Rodney	Federalist	3,884	51.5%
James Derickson	Democratic-Republican	3,653	48.4%

Rodney took his seat December 2, 1822, at the start of the 2nd session of the 17th Congress.

== See also ==
- List of special elections to the United States House of Representatives
- 1822 and 1823 United States House of Representatives elections
- List of United States representatives from Delaware
