= 1822 Virginia gubernatorial election =

- December 10, 1822
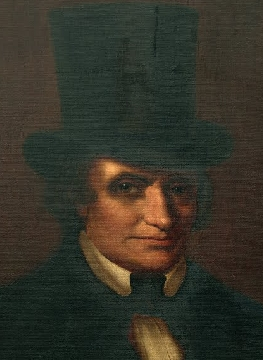

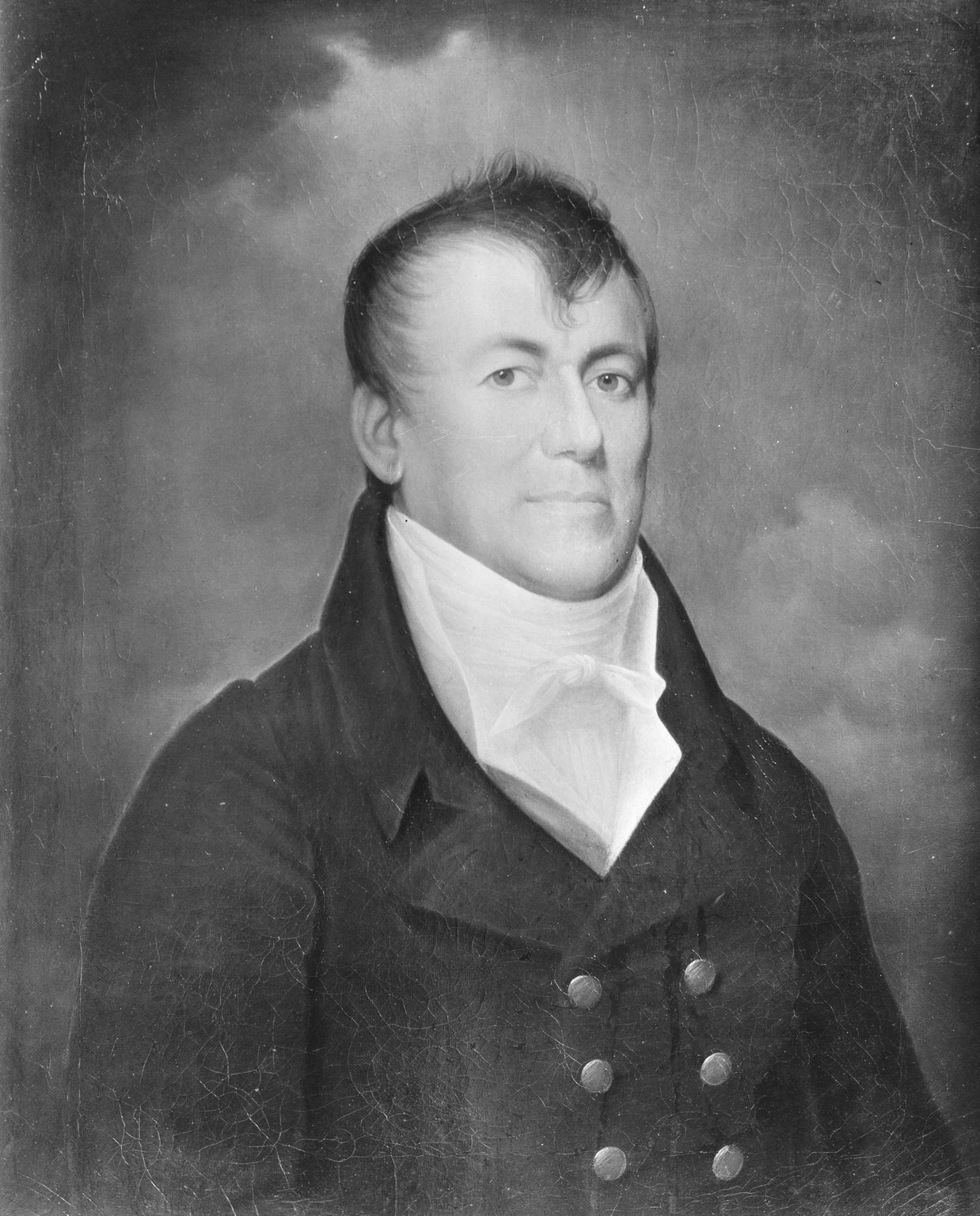

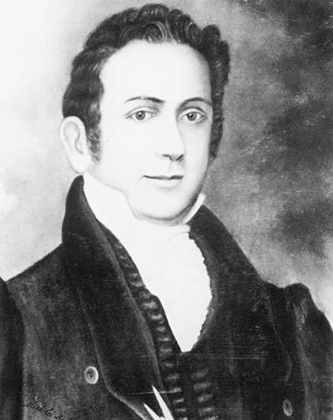
Nominee	James Pleasants	George Hay	Linn Banks
1st ballot	151	37	18
Governor before election
Thomas Mann Randolph Jr.
Democratic-Republican
Elected Governor
James Pleasants
Democratic-Republican (Note: Lampi lists no parties for this election. Both Kallenbach and Kallenbach and Sobel and Raimo list Pleasants as a Democratic-Republican during his tenure.)

A gubernatorial election was held in Virginia on December 10, 1822. The junior U.S. senator from Virginia James Pleasants defeated the member of the Virginia House of Delegates from Henrico County George Hay and the speaker of the Virginia House of Delegates Linn Banks.

The incumbent governor of Virginia Thomas Mann Randolph Jr. was ineligible for re-election due to term limits established by the Constitution of Virginia. The election was conducted by the Virginia General Assembly in joint session. The former president of the United States James Madison was nominated in the House of Delegates, but declined to run. Pleasants was elected with a majority on the first ballot.

== General election ==
1822 Virginia gubernatorial special election
Candidate	First ballot	
Candidate	Count	Percent
James Pleasants	151	70.23
George Hay	37	17.21
Linn Banks	18	8.37
Others	9	4.19
Total	215	100.00

== Bibliography ==
- Kallenbach, Joseph E.; Kallenbach, Jessamine S. (1977). American State Governors, 1776–1976. Vol. 1. Dobbs Ferry, NY: Oceana Publications.
- Lampi, Philip J. (2012). "Virginia 1822 Governor". A New Nation Votes. American Antiquarian Society.
- Sobel, Robert; Raimo, John (1978). Biographical Directory of the Governors of the United States 1789–1978. Vol. 4. Westport, CT: Meckler Books.
