= Orange Merwin =

American politician

Member of the U.S. House of Representatives from Connecticut's at-large district
- In office March 4, 1825 – March 3, 1829
- Preceded by: Lemuel Whitman
- Succeeded by: Ebenezer Young

Personal details
- Born: April 7, 1777 Merryall, New Milford, Connecticut
- Died: September 4, 1853 (aged 76) New Milford, Connecticut
- Party: National Republican Party
- Occupation: Farmer

Orange Merwin (April 7, 1777 – September 4, 1853) was a United States representative from Connecticut. He was born in Merryall, Connecticut and attended the common schools. He later engaged in agricultural pursuits.

Merwin was a member of the Connecticut House of Representatives 1815-1820 and was a delegate to the Connecticut constitutional convention in 1818. He later served in the Connecticut Senate 1821-1825. He was also a member of the committee of twenty-four to draft the state constitution.

Merwin was elected as an Adams candidate to the Nineteenth and Twentieth Congresses (March 4, 1825 – March 3, 1829). He was not a candidate for renomination in 1828. He resumed agricultural pursuits and was an unsuccessful candidate for Lieutenant Governor of Connecticut in 1831. He died in New Milford, Connecticut in 1853 and was buried in Center Cemetery.

U.S. House of Representatives
Preceded by Lemuel Whitman	Member of the U.S. House of Representatives from Connecticut's at-large congressional district March 4, 1825 – March 3, 1829	Succeeded by Ebenezer Young
