= John Barney =

American politician (1785–1857)

John Barney (January 18, 1785 – January 26, 1857) was a U.S. Congressman from the fifth district of Maryland, serving from 1825 to 1829. He was the son of Commodore Joshua Barney, a hero of the Revolution and the War of 1812.

== Early life ==
John Barney was born on January 18, 1785, in Baltimore, Maryland.

== Career ==
Barney was appointed a captain and assistant district quartermaster general in the United States Army on August 15, 1814, and served until June 15, 1815, when he was honorably discharged.

Barney was a member of the National Republican Party. He was an unsuccessful candidate for election in 1822 to the United States House of Representatives from Maryland. He was elected to the Nineteenth and Twentieth Congresses, serving from March 4, 1825, to March 3, 1829. He was an unsuccessful candidate for re-election in 1828 to the Twenty-first Congress.

Barney engaged in literary pursuits until his death. He wrote "Anecdotes of Remarkable Public Men".

== Personal life ==
Barney died of pneumonia on January 26, 1857, at his "The Portico" home in Washington, D.C. He was buried in Green Mount Cemetery in Baltimore.

U.S. House of Representatives
Preceded by Isaac McKim	Representative of the Fifth Congressional District of Maryland; 1825–1829	Succeeded by Elias Brown and Benjamin Chew Howard
