= 1822 South Carolina's 9th congressional district special election =

On May 8, 1822, James Blair (DR) of South Carolina's 9th district resigned. A special election was held to fill the resulting vacancy. Blair himself had been elected in a special election earlier in the same Congress.

== Election results ==
Candidate	Party	Votes	Percent
John Carter	Democratic-Republican	1,132	36.4%
James G. Spann		1,114	35.8%
John Waties		864	27.8%

Carter took his seat December 11, 1822.

== See also ==
- List of special elections to the United States House of Representatives
