= 1822 Pennsylvania's 14th congressional district special election =

On May 8, 1822, the last day of the First Session of the 17th Congress, Henry Baldwin (DR) of Pennsylvania's 14th district resigned from Congress. A special election was held on October 1, 1822, to fill the resulting vacancy.

== Election results ==
Candidate	Party	Votes	Percent
Walter Forward	Democratic-Republican	2,676	58.2%
Ephraim Pentland	Independent	1,921	41.8%

Forward took his seat on December 2, 1822

== See also ==
- List of special elections to the United States House of Representatives
