= Mark Harris (Maine politician) =

American politician

Mark Harris (January 27, 1779 – March 2, 1843) was a United States representative from Maine. He was born in Ipswich, Massachusetts on January 27, 1779. He attended the common schools, then moved to Portland, Maine (then a district of Massachusetts) in 1800.

He engaged in mercantile pursuits. Harris was a member of the Massachusetts State Senate in 1816. He held several local offices, and was elected as a Democratic-Republican to the Seventeenth Congress to fill the vacancy caused by the resignation of Ezekiel Whitman. He served from December 2, 1822, to March 3, 1823. Harris resumed mercantile pursuits, then was elected a member of the Maine House of Representatives in 1830. He served as treasurer of Cumberland County 1824-1832 and 1834–1840. He also served as Maine Treasurer in 1828 and again in 1832–1834.

He moved to New York City in 1842 and engaged in mercantile pursuits there, where he died on March 2, 1843. Harris is believed to have been interred at Eastern Cemetery in Portland, Maine.

U.S. House of Representatives
| Preceded by Ezekiel Whitman | Member of the U.S. House of Representatives from Maine's 2nd congressional district December 2, 1822 – March 3, 1823 | Succeeded by Stephen Longfellow |
Political offices
| Preceded by Elias Thomas | Treasurer of Maine; 1828 | Succeeded by Elias Thomas |
