= 1822 Pennsylvania's 6th congressional district special election =

On May 20, 1822, Samuel Moore (DR) of Pennsylvania's 6th district resigned. A special election was held on October 1, 1822, to fill the resulting vacancy.

== Election result ==
Candidate	Party	Votes	Percent
Samuel D. Ingham	Democratic-Republican	6,131	60.5%
Samuel Sitgreaves	Federalist	4,002	39.5%

Ingham took his seat on December 2, 1822.

== See also ==
- List of special elections to the United States House of Representatives
