= 1822 South Carolina's 2nd congressional district special election =

On May 8, 1822, William Lowndes (DR) of South Carolina's 2nd district resigned. A special election was held to fill the resulting vacancy.

== Election results ==
Candidate	Party	Votes	Percent
James Hamilton, Jr.	Democratic-Republican	740	56.7%
Richard B. Screvan		389	29.8%
William Elliott		175	13.4%

Hamilton took his seat on January 6, 1823.

== See also ==
- List of special elections to the United States House of Representatives
