= 1822 New York's 9th congressional district special election =

On January 14, 1822, Solomon Van Rensselaer (DR) of New York's 9th district resigned to accept a position as Postmaster of Albany. A special election was held February 25–27, 1822.

== Election results ==
Candidate	Party	Votes	Percent
Stephen Van Rensselaer	Federalist	2,266	80.7%
Solomon Southwick	Democratic-Republican ("Bucktail" faction)	499	17.8%
Others		43	1.5%

Rensselaer took his seat on March 12, 1822.

== See also ==
- List of special elections to the United States House of Representatives
