= 1822 Pennsylvania's 7th congressional district special election =

On October 17, 1822, Ludwig Worman (F) of Pennsylvania's 7th district died in office. A special election was held to fill the resulting vacancy on December 10, 1822

== Election results ==
| Candidate | Party | Votes | Percent |
|---|---|---|---|
| Daniel Udree | Democratic-Republican | 1,574 | 51.8% |
| William Witman | Independent Republican | 1,465 | 48.2% |

Udree took his seat on December 23, 1822.

== See also ==
- List of special elections to the United States House of Representatives
