= Ezekiel Whitman =

American judge (1776–1866)

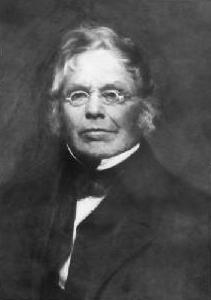

Member of the U.S. House of Representatives
- In office March 4, 1817 – June 1, 1822
- Preceded by: George Bradbury
- Succeeded by: Mark Harris
- Constituency: Massachusetts 15th (1817–1821); Maine 2nd (1821–1822)
- In office March 4, 1809 – March 3, 1811
- Preceded by: Daniel Ilsley
- Succeeded by: William Widgery
- Constituency: Massachusetts 15th

Personal details
- Born: March 9, 1776 East Bridgewater, Province of Massachusetts Bay, British America
- Died: August 1, 1866 (aged 90) East Bridgewater, Massachusetts, U.S.
- Party: Federalist
- Education: Brown University
- Occupation: Lawyer

Ezekiel Whitman (March 9, 1776 – August 1, 1866) was a Representative from Maine, both when it was the District of Maine within Massachusetts and after it became an independent state. He was born in East Bridgewater in the Province of Massachusetts Bay on March 9, 1776. He graduated from Brown University in 1795. He studied law, was admitted to the bar and practiced in New Gloucester, Maine, and in Portland, Maine (both communities a district of Massachusetts until 1820).

He was an unsuccessful candidate for election in 1806 to the Tenth Congress. He was elected as a Federalist from Massachusetts to the Eleventh Congress (March 4, 1809 – March 3, 1811). He was a member of the executive council in 1815 and 1816. He was elected to the Fifteenth and Sixteenth Congresses (March 4, 1817 – March 3, 1821). Whitman was a delegate to the convention in 1819 that framed the first State constitution of Maine. He was elected to the Seventeenth Congress from Maine and served from March 4, 1821, to June 1, 1822, when he resigned.

He served as a judge of the court of common pleas of Maine 1822-1841. He was an unsuccessful candidate for election in 1838 to the Twenty-sixth Congress. Whitman served as chief justice of the Maine Supreme Judicial Court 1841-1848. He retired in 1852 and returned to East Bridgewater, Massachusetts, where he died on August 1, 1866.

U.S. House of Representatives
Preceded by Daniel Ilsley	Member of the U.S. House of Representatives from Massachusetts's 15th congressional district (Maine district); March 4, 1809 – March 3, 1811	Succeeded by William Widgery
Preceded by George Bradbury	Member of the U.S. House of Representatives from Massachusetts's 15th congressional district (Maine district); March 4, 1817 – March 3, 1821	Succeeded by District moved to Maine
Preceded by District moved from Massachusetts	Member of the U.S. House of Representatives from Maine's 2nd congressional district March 4, 1821 – June 1, 1822	Succeeded by Mark Harris
