= George Bradbury (American politician) =

American politician

Member of the U.S. House of Representatives from Massachusetts's 15th district
- In office March 4, 1813 – March 3, 1817
- Preceded by: William Widgery
- Succeeded by: Ezekiel Whitman

Personal details
- Born: October 10, 1770 Falmouth, Province of Massachusetts Bay, British America
- Died: November 7, 1823 (aged 53) Portland, Maine, U.S.
- Party: Federalist
- Education: Harvard University
- Occupation: Lawyer

George Bradbury (October 10, 1770 – November 7, 1823) was a U.S. representative from Massachusetts. He also served one term (1822) in the Maine Senate, representing Cumberland County, Maine.

Born in Falmouth in the Province of Massachusetts Bay, Bradbury graduated from Harvard University in 1789. He studied law. He was admitted to the bar and commenced practice in Portland, Maine (until 1820 a district of Massachusetts). He served as member of the Massachusetts House of Representatives 1806–1812.

Bradbury was elected as a Federalist to the Thirteenth and Fourteenth Congresses (March 4, 1813 – March 3, 1817). He was an unsuccessful candidate for renomination in 1816. He resumed the practice of law. He served as associate clerk of the Portland Court 1817–1820. He served as member of the State senate in 1822. He died in Portland, Maine, November 7, 1823, and was interred in Portland's Eastern Cemetery.

== Sources ==
- United States Congress. "George Bradbury (id: B000733)". Biographical Directory of the United States Congress.

U.S. House of Representatives
Preceded by William Widgery	Member of the U.S. House of Representatives from Massachusetts's 15th congressional district 1813-1817	Succeeded by Ezekiel Whitman
