= Massachusetts's congressional delegations =

These are tables of congressional delegations from Massachusetts to the United States House of Representatives and the United States Senate.

== Current delegation ==
Current U.S. senators from Massachusetts
Massachusetts CPVI (2025): D+14	Class I senator	Class II senator
Massachusetts CPVI (2025): D+14	Elizabeth Warren (Senior senator) (Cambridge)	Ed Markey (Junior senator) (Malden)
Party	Democratic	Democratic
Incumbent since	January 3, 2013	July 16, 2013

Massachusetts is currently represented by two senators and nine representatives, all of whom are Democrats. The current dean of the Massachusetts delegation is Representative Richard Neal, having served in Congress since 1989.

Current U.S. representatives from Massachusetts
District	Member (Residence)	Party	Incumbent since	CPVI (2025)	District map
1st	Richard Neal (Springfield)	Democratic	January 3, 1989	D+8	
2nd	Jim McGovern (Worcester)	Democratic	January 3, 1997	D+13	
3rd	Lori Trahan (Westford)	Democratic	January 3, 2019	D+11	
4th	Jake Auchincloss (Newton)	Democratic	January 3, 2021	D+11	
5th	Katherine Clark (Revere)	Democratic	December 12, 2013	D+24	
6th	Seth Moulton (Salem)	Democratic	January 3, 2015	D+11	
7th	Ayanna Pressley (Boston)	Democratic	January 3, 2019	D+34	
8th	Stephen Lynch (Boston)	Democratic	October 16, 2001	D+15	
9th	Bill Keating (Bourne)	Democratic	January 3, 2011	D+6	

== United States Senate ==
Class I senator	Congress	Class II senator
Tristram Dalton (PA)	1st (1789–1791)	Caleb Strong (PA)
George Cabot (PA)	2nd (1791–1793)	Caleb Strong (PA)
George Cabot (PA)	3rd (1793–1795)	Caleb Strong (PA)
George Cabot (PA)	4th (1795–1797)	Caleb Strong (PA)
Benjamin Goodhue (F)	4th (1795–1797)	Theodore Sedgwick (F)
Benjamin Goodhue (F)	5th (1797–1799)	Theodore Sedgwick (F)
Benjamin Goodhue (F)	6th (1799–1801)	Samuel Dexter (F)
Jonathan Mason (F)	6th (1799–1801)	Dwight Foster (F)
Jonathan Mason (F)	7th (1801–1803)	Dwight Foster (F)
John Quincy Adams (F)	8th (1803–1805)	Timothy Pickering (F)
John Quincy Adams (F)	9th (1805–1807)	Timothy Pickering (F)
John Quincy Adams (F)	10th (1807–1809)	Timothy Pickering (F)
James Lloyd (F)	10th (1807–1809)	Timothy Pickering (F)
James Lloyd (F)	11th (1809–1811)	Timothy Pickering (F)
James Lloyd (F)	12th (1811–1813)	Joseph Bradley; Varnum (DR)
James Lloyd (F)	13th (1813–1815)	Joseph Bradley; Varnum (DR)
Christopher Gore (F)	13th (1813–1815)	Joseph Bradley; Varnum (DR)
Christopher Gore (F)	14th (1815–1817)	Joseph Bradley; Varnum (DR)
Eli P. Ashmun (F)	14th (1815–1817)	Joseph Bradley; Varnum (DR)
Eli P. Ashmun (F)	15th (1817–1819)	Harrison Gray Otis (F)
Prentiss Mellen (F)	15th (1817–1819)	Harrison Gray Otis (F)
Prentiss Mellen (F)	16th (1819–1821)	Harrison Gray Otis (F)
Elijah H. Mills (F)	16th (1819–1821)	Harrison Gray Otis (F)
Elijah H. Mills (F)	17th (1821–1823)	Harrison Gray Otis (F)
Elijah H. Mills (F)	17th (1821–1823)	James Lloyd (F)
Elijah H. Mills (F)	18th (1823–1825)	James Lloyd (F)
Elijah H. Mills (NR)	19th (1825–1827)	James Lloyd (NR)
Elijah H. Mills (NR)	19th (1825–1827)	Nathaniel Silsbee (NR)
Daniel Webster (NR)	20th (1827–1829)	Nathaniel Silsbee (NR)
Daniel Webster (NR)	21st (1829–1831)	Nathaniel Silsbee (NR)
Daniel Webster (NR)	22nd (1831–1833)	Nathaniel Silsbee (NR)
Daniel Webster (NR)	23rd (1833–1835)	Nathaniel Silsbee (NR)
Daniel Webster (NR)	24th (1835–1837)	John Davis (NR)
Daniel Webster (W)	25th (1837–1839)	John Davis (W)
Daniel Webster (W)	26th (1839–1841)	John Davis (W)
Daniel Webster (W)	26th (1839–1841)	Isaac C. Bates (W)
Rufus Choate (W)	27th (1841–1843)	Isaac C. Bates (W)
Rufus Choate (W)	28th (1843–1845)	Isaac C. Bates (W)
Daniel Webster (W)	29th (1845–1847)	Isaac C. Bates (W)
Daniel Webster (W)	29th (1845–1847)	John Davis (W)
Daniel Webster (W)	30th (1847–1849)	John Davis (W)
Daniel Webster (W)	31st (1849–1851)	John Davis (W)
Robert C. Winthrop (W)	31st (1849–1851)	John Davis (W)
Robert Rantoul Jr. (D)	31st (1849–1851)	John Davis (W)
Charles Sumner (FS)	32nd (1851–1853)	John Davis (W)
Charles Sumner (FS)	33rd (1853–1855)	Edward Everett (W)
Charles Sumner (FS)	33rd (1853–1855)	Julius Rockwell (W)
Charles Sumner (FS)	33rd (1853–1855)	Henry Wilson (FS)
Charles Sumner (FS)	34th (1855–1857)	Henry Wilson (R)
Charles Sumner (R)	35th (1857–1859)	Henry Wilson (R)
Charles Sumner (R)	36th (1859–1861)	Henry Wilson (R)
Charles Sumner (R)	37th (1861–1863)	Henry Wilson (R)
Charles Sumner (R)	38th (1863–1865)	Henry Wilson (R)
Charles Sumner (R)	39th (1865–1867)	Henry Wilson (R)
Charles Sumner (R)	40th (1867–1869)	Henry Wilson (R)
Charles Sumner (R)	41st (1869–1871)	Henry Wilson (R)
Charles Sumner (R)	42nd (1871–1873)	Henry Wilson (R)
Charles Sumner (LR)	43rd (1873–1875)	George S. Boutwell (R)
William B. Washburn (R)	43rd (1873–1875)	George S. Boutwell (R)
Henry L. Dawes (R)	44th (1875–1877)	George S. Boutwell (R)
Henry L. Dawes (R)	45th (1877–1879)	George F. Hoar (R)
Henry L. Dawes (R)	46th (1879–1881)	George F. Hoar (R)
Henry L. Dawes (R)	47th (1881–1883)	George F. Hoar (R)
Henry L. Dawes (R)	48th (1883–1885)	George F. Hoar (R)
Henry L. Dawes (R)	49th (1885–1887)	George F. Hoar (R)
Henry L. Dawes (R)	50th (1887–1889)	George F. Hoar (R)
Henry L. Dawes (R)	51st (1889–1891)	George F. Hoar (R)
Henry L. Dawes (R)	52nd (1891–1893)	George F. Hoar (R)
Henry Cabot Lodge (R)	53rd (1893–1895)	George F. Hoar (R)
Henry Cabot Lodge (R)	54th (1895–1897)	George F. Hoar (R)
Henry Cabot Lodge (R)	55th (1897–1899)	George F. Hoar (R)
Henry Cabot Lodge (R)	56th (1899–1901)	George F. Hoar (R)
Henry Cabot Lodge (R)	57th (1901–1903)	George F. Hoar (R)
Henry Cabot Lodge (R)	58th (1903–1905)	George F. Hoar (R)
Henry Cabot Lodge (R)	58th (1903–1905)	Winthrop M. Crane (R)
Henry Cabot Lodge (R)	59th (1905–1907)	Winthrop M. Crane (R)
Henry Cabot Lodge (R)	60th (1907–1909)	Winthrop M. Crane (R)
Henry Cabot Lodge (R)	61st (1909–1911)	Winthrop M. Crane (R)
Henry Cabot Lodge (R)	62nd (1911–1913)	Winthrop M. Crane (R)
Henry Cabot Lodge (R)	63rd (1913–1915)	John W. Weeks (R)
Henry Cabot Lodge (R)	64th (1915–1917)	John W. Weeks (R)
Henry Cabot Lodge (R)	65th (1917–1919)	John W. Weeks (R)
Henry Cabot Lodge (R)	66th (1919–1921)	David I. Walsh (D)
Henry Cabot Lodge (R)	67th (1921–1923)	David I. Walsh (D)
Henry Cabot Lodge (R)	68th (1923–1925)	David I. Walsh (D)
William M. Butler (R)	68th (1923–1925)	David I. Walsh (D)
William M. Butler (R)	69th (1925–1927)	Frederick H. Gillett (R)
David I. Walsh (D)	69th (1925–1927)	Frederick H. Gillett (R)
David I. Walsh (D)	70th (1927–1929)	Frederick H. Gillett (R)
David I. Walsh (D)	71st (1929–1931)	Frederick H. Gillett (R)
David I. Walsh (D)	72nd (1931–1933)	Marcus A. Coolidge (D)
David I. Walsh (D)	73rd (1933–1935)	Marcus A. Coolidge (D)
David I. Walsh (D)	74th (1935–1937)	Marcus A. Coolidge (D)
David I. Walsh (D)	75th (1937–1939)	Henry Cabot Lodge Jr. (R)
David I. Walsh (D)	76th (1939–1941)	Henry Cabot Lodge Jr. (R)
David I. Walsh (D)	77th (1941–1943)	Henry Cabot Lodge Jr. (R)
David I. Walsh (D)	78th (1943–1945)	Henry Cabot Lodge Jr. (R)
David I. Walsh (D)	78th (1943–1945)	Sinclair Weeks (R)
David I. Walsh (D)	79th (1945–1947)	Leverett Saltonstall (R)
Henry Cabot Lodge Jr. (R)	80th (1947–1949)	Leverett Saltonstall (R)
Henry Cabot Lodge Jr. (R)	81st (1949–1951)	Leverett Saltonstall (R)
Henry Cabot Lodge Jr. (R)	82nd (1951–1953)	Leverett Saltonstall (R)
John F. Kennedy (D)	83rd (1953–1955)	Leverett Saltonstall (R)
John F. Kennedy (D)	84th (1955–1957)	Leverett Saltonstall (R)
John F. Kennedy (D)	85th (1957–1959)	Leverett Saltonstall (R)
John F. Kennedy (D)	86th (1959–1961)	Leverett Saltonstall (R)
Benjamin A. Smith II (D)	86th (1959–1961)	Leverett Saltonstall (R)
Benjamin A. Smith II (D)	87th (1961–1963)	Leverett Saltonstall (R)
Ted Kennedy (D)	87th (1961–1963)	Leverett Saltonstall (R)
Ted Kennedy (D)	88th (1963–1965)	Leverett Saltonstall (R)
Ted Kennedy (D)	89th (1965–1967)	Leverett Saltonstall (R)
Ted Kennedy (D)	90th (1967–1969)	Edward Brooke (R)
Ted Kennedy (D)	91st (1969–1971)	Edward Brooke (R)
Ted Kennedy (D)	92nd (1971–1973)	Edward Brooke (R)
Ted Kennedy (D)	93rd (1973–1975)	Edward Brooke (R)
Ted Kennedy (D)	94th (1975–1977)	Edward Brooke (R)
Ted Kennedy (D)	95th (1977–1979)	Edward Brooke (R)
Ted Kennedy (D)	96th (1979–1981)	Paul Tsongas (D)
Ted Kennedy (D)	97th (1981–1983)	Paul Tsongas (D)
Ted Kennedy (D)	98th (1983–1985)	Paul Tsongas (D)
Ted Kennedy (D)	98th (1983–1985)	John Kerry (D)
Ted Kennedy (D)	99th (1985–1987)	John Kerry (D)
Ted Kennedy (D)	100th (1987–1989)	John Kerry (D)
Ted Kennedy (D)	101st (1989–1991)	John Kerry (D)
Ted Kennedy (D)	102nd (1991–1993)	John Kerry (D)
Ted Kennedy (D)	103rd (1993–1995)	John Kerry (D)
Ted Kennedy (D)	104th (1995–1997)	John Kerry (D)
Ted Kennedy (D)	105th (1997–1999)	John Kerry (D)
Ted Kennedy (D)	106th (1999–2001)	John Kerry (D)
Ted Kennedy (D)	107th (2001–2003)	John Kerry (D)
Ted Kennedy (D)	108th (2003–2005)	John Kerry (D)
Ted Kennedy (D)	109th (2005–2007)	John Kerry (D)
Ted Kennedy (D)	110th (2007–2009)	John Kerry (D)
Ted Kennedy (D)	111th (2009–2011)	John Kerry (D)
Paul G. Kirk (D)	111th (2009–2011)	John Kerry (D)
Scott Brown (R)	111th (2009–2011)	John Kerry (D)
Scott Brown (R)	112th (2011–2013)	John Kerry (D)
Elizabeth Warren (D)	113th (2013–2015)	John Kerry (D)
Elizabeth Warren (D)	113th (2013–2015)	Mo Cowan (D)
Elizabeth Warren (D)	113th (2013–2015)	Ed Markey (D)
Elizabeth Warren (D)	114th (2015–2017)	Ed Markey (D)
Elizabeth Warren (D)	115th (2017–2019)	Ed Markey (D)
Elizabeth Warren (D)	116th (2019–2021)	Ed Markey (D)
Elizabeth Warren (D)	117th (2021–2023)	Ed Markey (D)
Elizabeth Warren (D)	118th (2023–2025)	Ed Markey (D)
Elizabeth Warren (D)	119th (2025–2027)	Ed Markey (D)
Elizabeth Warren (D)	120th (2027–2029)	Ed Markey (D)

== United States House of Representatives ==
=== 1789 to 1793: 8 seats ===
Article I of the United States Constitution allocated 8 seats to Massachusetts.

Congress	District							
Congress	1st	2nd	3rd	4th	5th	6th	7th	8th
1st (1789–1791)	Fisher; Ames (PA)	Benjamin; Goodhue (PA)	Elbridge; Gerry (AA)	Theodore; Sedgwick (PA)	George Partridge (PA)	George; Thatcher (PA)	George; Leonard (PA)	Jonathan Grout (AA)
1st (1789–1791)	Fisher; Ames (PA)	Benjamin; Goodhue (PA)	Elbridge; Gerry (AA)	Theodore; Sedgwick (PA)	vacant	George; Thatcher (PA)	George; Leonard (PA)	Jonathan Grout (AA)
2nd (1791–1793)	Fisher; Ames (PA)	Benjamin; Goodhue (PA)	Elbridge; Gerry (AA)	Theodore; Sedgwick (PA)	Shearjashub Bourne (PA)	George Leonard (PA)	Artemas Ward (PA)	George Thatcher (PA)

=== 1793 to 1803: 14 seats ===
After the 1790 census, Massachusetts gained six seats.

In the third Congress only, there were plural districts in which more than one member would be elected from the same district and there was also an at-large seat. After that Congress, however, there would be no at-large seats and no plural seats.

Congress	District													
Congress	1st (4 seats)				2nd (4 seats)				3rd (2 seats)		4th (3 seats)			At-large
3rd (1793–1795)	Samuel; Holten (AA)	Benjamin; Goodhue (PA)	Samuel; Dexter (PA)	Fisher; Ames (PA)	Dwight; Foster (PA)	Theodore; Sedgwick (PA)	William; Lyman (AA)	Artemas; Ward (PA)	Peleg Coffin; Jr. (PA)	Shearjashub; Bourne (PA)	Peleg; Wadsworth (PA)	Henry; Dearborn (AA)	George; Thatcher (PA)	David; Cobb (PA)
Congress	District													
Congress	1st	2nd	3rd	4th	5th	6th	7th	8th	9th	10th	11th	12th	13th	14th
4th (1795–1797)	Theodore; Sedgwick (F)	William; Lyman (DR)	Samuel; Lyman (F)	Dwight; Foster (F)	Nathaniel; Freeman; Jr. (DR)	John Reed; Sr. (F)	George; Leonard (F)	Fisher; Ames (F)	Joseph; Bradley; Varnum (DR)	Benjamin; Goodhue (F)	Theophilus; Bradbury (F)	Henry; Dearborn (DR)	Peleg; Wadsworth (F)	George; Thatcher (F)
4th (1795–1797)	Thomson J. Skinner (DR)	William; Lyman (DR)	Samuel; Lyman (F)	Dwight; Foster (F)	Nathaniel; Freeman; Jr. (DR)	John Reed; Sr. (F)	George; Leonard (F)	Fisher; Ames (F)	Joseph; Bradley; Varnum (DR)	Samuel; Sewall (F)	Theophilus; Bradbury (F)	Henry; Dearborn (DR)	Peleg; Wadsworth (F)	George; Thatcher (F)
5th (1797–1799)	Thomson J. Skinner (DR)	William; Shepard (F)	Samuel; Lyman (F)	Dwight; Foster (F)	Nathaniel; Freeman; Jr. (DR)	John Reed; Sr. (F)	Stephen; Bullock (F)	Harrison; Gray; Otis (F)	Joseph; Bradley; Varnum (DR)	Samuel; Sewall (F)	Theophilus; Bradbury (F)	Isaac; Parker (F)	Peleg; Wadsworth (F)	George; Thatcher (F)
5th (1797–1799)	Thomson J. Skinner (DR)	William; Shepard (F)	Samuel; Lyman (F)	Dwight; Foster (F)	Nathaniel; Freeman; Jr. (DR)	John Reed; Sr. (F)	Stephen; Bullock (F)	Harrison; Gray; Otis (F)	Joseph; Bradley; Varnum (DR)	Samuel; Sewall (F)	Bailey; Bartlett (F)	Isaac; Parker (F)	Peleg; Wadsworth (F)	George; Thatcher (F)
6th (1799–1801)	Theodore; Sedgwick (F)	William; Shepard (F)	Samuel; Lyman (F)	Dwight; Foster (F)	Lemuel; Williams (F)	John Reed; Sr. (F)	Phanuel; Bishop (DR)	Harrison; Gray; Otis (F)	Joseph; Bradley; Varnum (DR)	Samuel; Sewall (F)	Bailey; Bartlett (F)	Silas Lee (F)	Peleg; Wadsworth (F)	George; Thatcher (F)
6th (1799–1801)	Theodore; Sedgwick (F)	William; Shepard (F)	Ebenezer; Mattoon (F)	Levi Lincoln; Sr. (DR)	Lemuel; Williams (F)	John Reed; Sr. (F)	Phanuel; Bishop (DR)	Harrison; Gray; Otis (F)	Joseph; Bradley; Varnum (DR)	Nathan; Read (F)	Bailey; Bartlett (F)	Silas Lee (F)	Peleg; Wadsworth (F)	George; Thatcher (F)
7th (1801–1803)	John; Bacon (DR)	William; Shepard (F)	Ebenezer; Mattoon (F)	Levi Lincoln; Sr. (DR)	Lemuel; Williams (F)	Josiah; Smith (DR)	Phanuel; Bishop (DR)	William; Eustis (DR)	Joseph; Bradley; Varnum (DR)	Nathan; Read (F)	Manasseh; Cutler (F)	Silas Lee (F)	Peleg; Wadsworth (F)	Richard; Cutts (DR)
7th (1801–1803)	John; Bacon (DR)	William; Shepard (F)	Ebenezer; Mattoon (F)	Seth Hastings (F)	Lemuel; Williams (F)	Josiah; Smith (DR)	Phanuel; Bishop (DR)	William; Eustis (DR)	Joseph; Bradley; Varnum (DR)	Nathan; Read (F)	Manasseh; Cutler (F)	Samuel Thatcher (F)	Peleg; Wadsworth (F)	Richard; Cutts (DR)

=== 1803 to 1813: 17 seats ===
After the 1800 census, Massachusetts gained three seats.

Congress	District										District						
Congress	1st	2nd	3rd	4th	5th	6th	7th	8th	9th	10th	11th	12th	13th	14th	15th	16th	17th
8th (1803–1805)	William; Eustis (DR)	Jacob; Crowninshield (DR)	Manasseh; Cutler (F)	Joseph; Bradley; Varnum (DR)	Thomas; Dwight (F)	Samuel; Taggart (F)	Nahum; Mitchell (F)	Lemuel; Williams (F)	Phanuel; Bishop (DR)	Seth; Hastings (F)	William; Stedman (F)	Thomson Skinner (DR)	Ebenezer; Seaver (DR)	Richard; Cutts (DR)	Peleg; Wadsworth (F)	Samuel; Thatcher (F)	Phineas; Bruce (F)
8th (1803–1805)	William; Eustis (DR)	Jacob; Crowninshield (DR)	Manasseh; Cutler (F)	Joseph; Bradley; Varnum (DR)	Thomas; Dwight (F)	Samuel; Taggart (F)	Nahum; Mitchell (F)	Lemuel; Williams (F)	Phanuel; Bishop (DR)	Seth; Hastings (F)	William; Stedman (F)	Simon Larned (DR)	Ebenezer; Seaver (DR)	Richard; Cutts (DR)	Peleg; Wadsworth (F)	Samuel; Thatcher (F)	Phineas; Bruce (F)
9th (1805–1807)	Josiah; Quincy III (F)	Jacob; Crowninshield (DR)	Jeremiah; Nelson (F)	Joseph; Bradley; Varnum (DR)	William; Ely (F)	Samuel; Taggart (F)	Joseph; Barker (DR)	Isaiah L. Green (DR)	Phanuel; Bishop (DR)	Seth; Hastings (F)	William; Stedman (F)	Barnabas; Bidwell (DR)	Ebenezer; Seaver (DR)	Richard; Cutts (DR)	Peleg; Wadsworth (F)	Orchard; Cook (DR)	John; Chandler (DR)
10th (1807–1809)	Josiah; Quincy III (F)	Jacob; Crowninshield (DR)	Edward; St. Loe; Livermore (F)	Joseph; Bradley; Varnum (DR)	William; Ely (F)	Samuel; Taggart (F)	Joseph; Barker (DR)	Isaiah L. Green (DR)	Josiah; Dean (DR)	Jabez; Upham (F)	William; Stedman (F)	Ezekiel; Bacon (DR)	Ebenezer; Seaver (DR)	Richard; Cutts (DR)	Daniel; Ilsley (DR)	Orchard; Cook (DR)	John; Chandler (DR)
10th (1807–1809)	Josiah; Quincy III (F)	Joseph Story (DR)	Edward; St. Loe; Livermore (F)	Joseph; Bradley; Varnum (DR)	William; Ely (F)	Samuel; Taggart (F)	Joseph; Barker (DR)	Isaiah L. Green (DR)	Josiah; Dean (DR)	Jabez; Upham (F)	William; Stedman (F)	Ezekiel; Bacon (DR)	Ebenezer; Seaver (DR)	Richard; Cutts (DR)	Daniel; Ilsley (DR)	Orchard; Cook (DR)	John; Chandler (DR)
11th (1809–1811)	Josiah; Quincy III (F)	Benjamin; Pickman Jr. (F)	Edward; St. Loe; Livermore (F)	Joseph; Bradley; Varnum (DR)	William; Ely (F)	Samuel; Taggart (F)	William Baylies (F)	Gideon; Gardner (DR)	Laban; Wheaton (F)	Jabez; Upham (F)	William; Stedman (F)	Ezekiel; Bacon (DR)	Ebenezer; Seaver (DR)	Richard; Cutts (DR)	Ezekiel; Whitman (F)	Orchard; Cook (DR)	Barzillai; Gannett (DR)
11th (1809–1811)	Josiah; Quincy III (F)	Benjamin; Pickman Jr. (F)	Edward; St. Loe; Livermore (F)	Joseph; Bradley; Varnum (DR)	William; Ely (F)	Samuel; Taggart (F)	Charles Turner (DR)	Gideon; Gardner (DR)	Laban; Wheaton (F)	Joseph Allen (F)	Abijah; Bigelow (F)	Ezekiel; Bacon (DR)	Ebenezer; Seaver (DR)	Richard; Cutts (DR)	Ezekiel; Whitman (F)	Orchard; Cook (DR)	Barzillai; Gannett (DR)
12th (1811–1813)	Josiah; Quincy III (F)	William; Reed (F)	Leonard; White (F)	William M. Richardson (DR)	William; Ely (F)	Samuel; Taggart (F)	Charles Turner (DR)	Isaiah L. Green (DR)	Laban; Wheaton (F)	Elijah; Brigham (F)	Abijah; Bigelow (F)	Ezekiel; Bacon (DR)	Ebenezer; Seaver (DR)	Richard; Cutts (DR)	William; Widgery (DR)	Peleg; Tallman (DR)	Barzillai; Gannett (DR)
12th (1811–1813)	Josiah; Quincy III (F)	William; Reed (F)	Leonard; White (F)	William M. Richardson (DR)	William; Ely (F)	Samuel; Taggart (F)	Charles Turner (DR)	Isaiah L. Green (DR)	Laban; Wheaton (F)	Elijah; Brigham (F)	Abijah; Bigelow (F)	Ezekiel; Bacon (DR)	Ebenezer; Seaver (DR)	Richard; Cutts (DR)	William; Widgery (DR)	Peleg; Tallman (DR)	Francis Carr (DR)

=== 1813 to 1823: 20 seats, then 13 ===
After the 1810 census, Massachusetts gained three seats to grow to its largest apportionment (so far). In 1820/21, however, seven of those seats were lost to the new state of Maine.

Congress	District																			
Congress	1st	2nd	3rd	4th	5th	6th	7th	8th	9th	10th	11th	12th	13th	14th	15th	16th	17th	18th	19th	20th
13th (1813–1815)	Artemas; Ward; Jr. (F)	William; Reed (F)	Timothy; Pickering (F)	William M. Richardson (DR)	William; Ely (F)	Samuel; Taggart (F)	William; Baylies (F)	John; Reed Jr. (F)	Laban; Wheaton (F)	Elijah; Brigham (F)	Abijah; Bigelow (F)	Daniel; Dewey (F)	Nathaniel; Ruggles (F)	Cyrus; King (F)	George; Bradbury (F)	Samuel; Davis (F)	Abiel; Wood (DR)	John; Wilson (F)	James; Parker (DR)	Levi; Hubbard (DR)
13th (1813–1815)	Artemas; Ward; Jr. (F)	William; Reed (F)	Timothy; Pickering (F)	Samuel Dana (DR)	William; Ely (F)	Samuel; Taggart (F)	William; Baylies (F)	John; Reed Jr. (F)	Laban; Wheaton (F)	Elijah; Brigham (F)	Abijah; Bigelow (F)	John Hulbert (F)	Nathaniel; Ruggles (F)	Cyrus; King (F)	George; Bradbury (F)	Samuel; Davis (F)	Abiel; Wood (DR)	John; Wilson (F)	James; Parker (DR)	Levi; Hubbard (DR)
14th (1815–1817)	Artemas; Ward; Jr. (F)	Timothy; Pickering (F)	Jeremiah; Nelson (F)	Asahel; Stearns (F)	Elijah H. Mills (F)	Samuel; Taggart (F)	John W. Hulbert (F)	William; Baylies (F)	John; Reed Jr. (F)	Laban; Wheaton (F)	Elijah; Brigham (F)	Solomon; Strong (F)	Nathaniel; Ruggles (F)	Cyrus; King (F)	George; Bradbury (F)	Benjamin; Brown (F)	James; Carr (F)	Thomas; Rice (F)	Samuel S. Conner (DR)	Albion; Parris (DR)
14th (1815–1817)	Artemas; Ward; Jr. (F)	Timothy; Pickering (F)	Jeremiah; Nelson (F)	Asahel; Stearns (F)	Elijah H. Mills (F)	Samuel; Taggart (F)	John W. Hulbert (F)	William; Baylies (F)	John; Reed Jr. (F)	Laban; Wheaton (F)	Benjamin; Adams (F)	Solomon; Strong (F)	Nathaniel; Ruggles (F)	Cyrus; King (F)	George; Bradbury (F)	Benjamin; Brown (F)	James; Carr (F)	Thomas; Rice (F)	Samuel S. Conner (DR)	Albion; Parris (DR)
15th (1817–1819)	Jonathan; Mason (F)	Nathaniel; Silsbee (DR)	Jeremiah; Nelson (F)	Timothy; Fuller (DR)	Elijah H. Mills (F)	Samuel; Clesson; Allen (F)	Henry; Shaw (DR)	Zabdiel; Sampson (DR)	Walter; Folger Jr. (DR)	Marcus; Morton (DR)	Benjamin; Adams (F)	Solomon; Strong (F)	Nathaniel; Ruggles (F)	John; Holmes (DR)	Ezekiel; Whitman (F)	Benjamin; Orr (F)	John; Wilson (F)	Thomas; Rice (F)	Joshua; Gage (DR)	Albion; Parris (DR)
15th (1817–1819)	Jonathan; Mason (F)	Nathaniel; Silsbee (DR)	Jeremiah; Nelson (F)	Timothy; Fuller (DR)	Elijah H. Mills (F)	Samuel; Clesson; Allen (F)	Henry; Shaw (DR)	Zabdiel; Sampson (DR)	Walter; Folger Jr. (DR)	Marcus; Morton (DR)	Benjamin; Adams (F)	Solomon; Strong (F)	Nathaniel; Ruggles (F)	John; Holmes (DR)	Ezekiel; Whitman (F)	Benjamin; Orr (F)	John; Wilson (F)	Thomas; Rice (F)	Joshua; Gage (DR)	Enoch; Lincoln (DR)
16th (1819–1821)	Jonathan; Mason (F)	Nathaniel; Silsbee (DR)	Jeremiah; Nelson (F)	Timothy; Fuller (DR)	Samuel; Lathrop (F)	Samuel; Clesson; Allen (F)	Henry; Shaw (DR)	Zabdiel; Sampson (DR)	Walter; Folger Jr. (DR)	Marcus; Morton (DR)	Benjamin; Adams (F)	Jonas; Kendall (F)	Edward; Dowse (DR)	John; Holmes (DR)	Ezekiel; Whitman (F)	Mark Langdon; Hill (DR)	Martin; Kinsley (DR)	James; Parker (DR)	Joshua; Cushman (DR)	Enoch; Lincoln (DR)
16th (1819–1821)	Benjamin; Gorham (DR)	Nathaniel; Silsbee (DR)	Jeremiah; Nelson (F)	Timothy; Fuller (DR)	Samuel; Lathrop (F)	Samuel; Clesson; Allen (F)	Henry; Shaw (DR)	Aaron; Hobart (DR)	Walter; Folger Jr. (DR)	Marcus; Morton (DR)	Benjamin; Adams (F)	Jonas; Kendall (F)	William; Eustis (DR)	vacant	Ezekiel; Whitman (F)	Mark Langdon; Hill (DR)	Martin; Kinsley (DR)	James; Parker (DR)	Joshua; Cushman (DR)	Enoch; Lincoln (DR)
16th (1819–1821)	Benjamin; Gorham (DR)	Nathaniel; Silsbee (DR)	Jeremiah; Nelson (F)	Timothy; Fuller (DR)	Samuel; Lathrop (F)	Samuel; Clesson; Allen (F)	Henry; Shaw (DR)	Aaron; Hobart (DR)	Walter; Folger Jr. (DR)	Marcus; Morton (DR)	Benjamin; Adams (F)	Jonas; Kendall (F)	William; Eustis (DR)	District of Maine split						
17th (1821–1823)	Benjamin; Gorham (DR)	Gideon; Barstow (DR)	Jeremiah; Nelson (F)	Timothy; Fuller (DR)	Samuel; Lathrop (F)	Samuel; Clesson; Allen (F)	Henry W. Dwight (F)	Aaron; Hobart (DR)	John; Reed Jr. (F)	Francis; Baylies (F)	Jonathan; Russell (DR)	Lewis; Bigelow (F)	William; Eustis (DR)	District of Maine split						

=== 1823–1833: 13 seats ===
Following the 1820 census, Massachusetts kept its remaining 13 seats without change.

Congress	District												
Congress	1st	2nd	3rd	4th	5th	6th	7th	8th	9th	10th	11th	12th	13th
18th (1823–1825)	Daniel; Webster (F) (Note: Supported the Adams-Clay faction in the 1824 United States presidential election.)	Benjamin W. Crowninshield (DR)	Jeremiah; Nelson (F)	Timothy; Fuller (DR)	Jonas; Sibley (DR)	John; Locke (DR)	Samuel Clesson; Allen (F)	Samuel; Lathrop (F)	Henry W. Dwight (F)	John; Bailey (DR)	Aaron; Hobart (DR)	Francis; Baylies (F) (Note: Supported the Jackson faction in the 1824 United States presidential election.)	John Reed; Jr. (F)
19th (1825–1827)	Daniel; Webster (NR)	Benjamin W. Crowninshield (NR)	John; Varnum (NR)	Edward; Everett (NR)	John; Davis (NR)	John; Locke (NR)	Samuel Clesson; Allen (NR)	Samuel; Lathrop (NR)	Henry W. Dwight (NR)	John; Bailey (NR)	Aaron; Hobart (NR)	Francis; Baylies (J)	John Reed; Jr. (NR)
20th (1827–1829)	Daniel; Webster (NR)	Benjamin W. Crowninshield (NR)	John; Varnum (NR)	Edward; Everett (NR)	John; Davis (NR)	John; Locke (NR)	Samuel Clesson; Allen (NR)	Isaac C. Bates (NR)	Henry W. Dwight (NR)	John; Bailey (NR)	Joseph; Richardson (NR)	James L. Hodges (NR)	John Reed; Jr. (NR)
20th (1827–1829)	Benjamin; Gorham (NR)	Benjamin W. Crowninshield (NR)	John; Varnum (NR)	Edward; Everett (NR)	John; Davis (NR)	John; Locke (NR)	Samuel Clesson; Allen (NR)	Isaac C. Bates (NR)	Henry W. Dwight (NR)	John; Bailey (NR)	Joseph; Richardson (NR)	James L. Hodges (NR)	John Reed; Jr. (NR)
21st (1829–1831)	Benjamin; Gorham (NR)	Benjamin W. Crowninshield (NR)	John; Varnum (NR)	Edward; Everett (NR)	John; Davis (NR)	Joseph G. Kendall (NR)	George; Grennell; Jr. (NR)	Isaac C. Bates (NR)	Henry W. Dwight (NR)	John; Bailey (NR)	Joseph; Richardson (NR)	James L. Hodges (NR)	John Reed; Jr. (NR)
22nd (1831–1833)	Nathan; Appleton (NR)	Rufus; Choate (NR)	Jeremiah; Nelson (NR)	Edward; Everett (NR)	John; Davis (NR)	Joseph G. Kendall (NR)	George; Grennell; Jr. (NR)	Isaac C. Bates (NR)	George N. Briggs (NR)	Henry A. S. Dearborn (NR)	John Quincy; Adams (NR)	James L. Hodges (NR)	John Reed; Jr. (NR)

=== 1833 to 1843: 12 seats ===
After the 1830 census, Massachusetts lost one seat.

Congress	District											
Congress	1st	2nd	3rd	4th	5th	6th	7th	8th	9th	10th	11th	12th
23rd (1833–1835)	Benjamin; Gorham (NR)	Rufus Choate (NR)	Gayton P. Osgood (J)	Edward; Everett (NR)	John Davis (NR)	George; Grennell; Jr. (NR)	George; N. Briggs (NR)	Isaac C. Bates (NR)	William; Jackson (A-M)	William; Baylies (NR)	John Reed; Jr. (NR)	John; Quincy; Adams (A-M)
23rd (1833–1835)	Benjamin; Gorham (NR)	Stephen; Philips (NR)	Gayton P. Osgood (J)	Edward; Everett (NR)	Levi Lincoln; Jr. (NR)	George; Grennell; Jr. (NR)	George; N. Briggs (NR)	Isaac C. Bates (NR)	William; Jackson (A-M)	William; Baylies (NR)	John Reed; Jr. (NR)	John; Quincy; Adams (A-M)
24th (1835–1837)	Abbott; Lawrence (NR)	Stephen; Philips (NR)	Caleb; Cushing (NR)	Samuel; Hoar (NR)	Levi Lincoln; Jr. (NR)	George; Grennell; Jr. (NR)	George; N. Briggs (NR)	William B. Calhoun (NR)	William; Jackson (A-M)	Nathaniel B. Borden (J)	John Reed; Jr. (A-M)	John; Quincy; Adams (A-M)
25th (1837–1839)	Richard; Fletcher (W)	Stephen Phillips (W)	Caleb; Cushing (W)	William; Parmenter (D)	Levi Lincoln; Jr. (W)	George; Grennell Jr. (W)	George; N. Briggs (W)	William; B. Calhoun (W)	William; Soden; Hastings (W)	Nathaniel B. Borden (D)	John Reed; Jr. (W)	John; Quincy; Adams (W)
25th (1837–1839)	Richard; Fletcher (W)	Leverett; Saltonstall I (W)	Caleb; Cushing (W)	William; Parmenter (D)	Levi Lincoln; Jr. (W)	George; Grennell Jr. (W)	George; N. Briggs (W)	William; B. Calhoun (W)	William; Soden; Hastings (W)	Nathaniel B. Borden (D)	John Reed; Jr. (W)	John; Quincy; Adams (W)
26th (1839–1841)	Abbott Lawrence (W)	Leverett; Saltonstall I (W)	Caleb; Cushing (W)	William; Parmenter (D)	Levi Lincoln; Jr. (W)	James Alvord (W)	George; N. Briggs (W)	William; B. Calhoun (W)	William; Soden; Hastings (W)	Henry; Williams (D)	John Reed; Jr. (W)	John; Quincy; Adams (W)
26th (1839–1841)	Robert C. Winthrop (W)	Leverett; Saltonstall I (W)	Caleb; Cushing (W)	William; Parmenter (D)	Levi Lincoln; Jr. (W)	Osmyn; Baker (W)	George; N. Briggs (W)	William; B. Calhoun (W)	William; Soden; Hastings (W)	Henry; Williams (D)	John Reed; Jr. (W)	John; Quincy; Adams (W)
27th (1841–1843)	Robert C. Winthrop (W)	Leverett; Saltonstall I (W)	Caleb; Cushing (W)	William; Parmenter (D)	Levi Lincoln; Jr. (W)	Osmyn; Baker (W)	George; N. Briggs (W)	William; B. Calhoun (W)	William; Soden; Hastings (W)	Nathaniel B. Borden (W)	Barker; Burnell (W)	John; Quincy; Adams (W)
27th (1841–1843)	Nathan Appleton (W)	Leverett; Saltonstall I (W)	Caleb; Cushing (W)	William; Parmenter (D)	Charles; Hudson (W)	Osmyn; Baker (W)	George; N. Briggs (W)	William; B. Calhoun (W)	William; Soden; Hastings (W)	Nathaniel B. Borden (W)	Barker; Burnell (W)	John; Quincy; Adams (W)
27th (1841–1843)	Robert C. Winthrop (W)	Leverett; Saltonstall I (W)	Caleb; Cushing (W)	William; Parmenter (D)	Charles; Hudson (W)	Osmyn; Baker (W)	George; N. Briggs (W)	William; B. Calhoun (W)	William; Soden; Hastings (W)	Nathaniel B. Borden (W)	Barker; Burnell (W)	John; Quincy; Adams (W)

=== 1843 to 1853: 10 seats ===
After the 1840 census, Massachusetts lost two seats.

Congress	District									
Congress	1st	2nd	3rd	4th	5th	6th	7th	8th	9th	10th
28th (1843–1845)	Robert Charles; Winthrop (W)	Daniel P. King (W)	Amos; Abbott (W)	William; Parmenter (D)	Charles; Hudson (W)	Osmyn; Baker (W)	Julius; Rockwell (W)	John Quincy; Adams (W)	Henry; Williams (D)	Barker; Burnell (W)
28th (1843–1845)	Robert Charles; Winthrop (W)	Daniel P. King (W)	Amos; Abbott (W)	William; Parmenter (D)	Charles; Hudson (W)	Osmyn; Baker (W)	Julius; Rockwell (W)	John Quincy; Adams (W)	Henry; Williams (D)	Joseph; Grinnell (W)
29th (1845–1847)	Robert Charles; Winthrop (W)	Daniel P. King (W)	Amos; Abbott (W)	Benjamin; Thompson (W)	Charles; Hudson (W)	George; Ashmun (W)	Julius; Rockwell (W)	John Quincy; Adams (W)	Artemas; Hale (W)	Joseph; Grinnell (W)
30th (1847–1849)	Robert Charles; Winthrop (W)	Daniel P. King (W)	Amos; Abbott (W)	John G. Palfrey (W)	Charles; Hudson (W)	George; Ashmun (W)	Julius; Rockwell (W)	John Quincy; Adams (W)	Artemas; Hale (W)	Joseph; Grinnell (W)
30th (1847–1849)	Robert Charles; Winthrop (W)	Daniel P. King (W)	Amos; Abbott (W)	John G. Palfrey (W)	Charles; Hudson (W)	George; Ashmun (W)	Julius; Rockwell (W)	Horace; Mann (W)	Artemas; Hale (W)	Joseph; Grinnell (W)
31st (1849–1851)	Robert Charles; Winthrop (W)	Daniel P. King (W)	James H. Duncan (W)	vacant	Charles; Allen (FS)	George; Ashmun (W)	Julius; Rockwell (W)	Horace; Mann (W)	Orin; Fowler (W)	Joseph; Grinnell (W)
31st (1849–1851)	Samuel A. Eliot (W)	Daniel P. King (W)	James H. Duncan (W)	vacant	Charles; Allen (FS)	George; Ashmun (W)	Julius; Rockwell (W)	Horace; Mann (W)	Orin; Fowler (W)	Joseph; Grinnell (W)
32nd (1851–1853)	William; Appleton (W)	Robert Rantoul (D)	James H. Duncan (W)	Benjamin Thompson (W)	Charles; Allen (FS)	George T. Davis (W)	John Z. Goodrich (W)	Horace; Mann (W)	Orin; Fowler (W)	Zeno; Scudder (W)
32nd (1851–1853)	William; Appleton (W)	Francis B. Fay (W)	James H. Duncan (W)	Lorenzo Sabine (W)	Charles; Allen (FS)	George T. Davis (W)	John Z. Goodrich (W)	Horace; Mann (W)	Edward P. Little (D)	Zeno; Scudder (W)

=== 1853 to 1863: 11 seats ===
After the 1850 census, Massachusetts gained one seat.

Congress	District										
Congress	1st	2nd	3rd	4th	5th	6th	7th	8th	9th	10th	11th
33rd (1853–1855)	Zeno Scudder (W)	Samuel L. Crocker (W)	J. Wiley; Edmands (W)	Samuel H. Walley (W)	William; Appleton (W)	Charles W. Upham (W)	Nathaniel P. Banks (D)	Tappan; Wentworth (W)	Alexander; De Witt (FS)	Edward; Dickinson (W)	John Z. Goodrich (W)
33rd (1853–1855)	Thomas D. Eliot (W)	Samuel L. Crocker (W)	J. Wiley; Edmands (W)	Samuel H. Walley (W)	William; Appleton (W)	Charles W. Upham (W)	Nathaniel P. Banks (D)	Tappan; Wentworth (W)	Alexander; De Witt (FS)	Edward; Dickinson (W)	John Z. Goodrich (W)
34th (1855–1857)	Robert Bernard; Hall (KN)	James; Buffington (KN)	William S. Damrell (KN)	Linus B. Comins (KN)	Anson; Burlingame (KN)	Timothy; Davis (KN)	Nathaniel P. Banks (KN)	Chauncey L. Knapp (KN)	Alexander; De Witt (KN)	Calvin C. Chaffee (KN)	Mark; Trafton (KN)
35th (1857–1859)	Robert Bernard; Hall (R)	James; Buffington (R)	William S. Damrell (R)	Linus B Comins (R)	Anson; Burlingame (R)	Timothy; Davis (R)	Nathaniel P. Banks (R)	Chauncey L. Knapp (R)	Eli; Thayer (R)	Calvin C. Chaffee (R)	Henry L. Dawes (R)
35th (1857–1859)	Robert Bernard; Hall (R)	James; Buffington (R)	William S. Damrell (R)	Linus B Comins (R)	Anson; Burlingame (R)	Timothy; Davis (R)	Daniel W. Gooch (R)	Chauncey L. Knapp (R)	Eli; Thayer (R)	Calvin C. Chaffee (R)	Henry L. Dawes (R)
36th (1859–1861)	Thomas D. Eliot (R)	James; Buffington (R)	Charles Francis; Adams Sr. (R)	Alexander; H. Rice (R)	Anson; Burlingame (R)	John B. Alley (R)	Daniel W. Gooch (R)	Charles R. Train (R)	Eli; Thayer (R)	Charles; Delano (R)	Henry L. Dawes (R)
37th (1861–1863)	Thomas D. Eliot (R)	James; Buffington (R)	Charles Francis; Adams Sr. (R)	Alexander; H. Rice (R)	William Appleton (U)	John B. Alley (R)	Daniel W. Gooch (R)	Charles R. Train (R)	Goldsmith Bailey (R)	Charles; Delano (R)	Henry L. Dawes (R)
37th (1861–1863)	Thomas D. Eliot (R)	James; Buffington (R)	Benjamin Thomas (U)	Alexander; H. Rice (R)	Samuel Hooper (U)	John B. Alley (R)	Daniel W. Gooch (R)	Charles R. Train (R)	Amasa Walker (R)	Charles; Delano (R)	Henry L. Dawes (R)

=== 1863 to 1873: 10 seats ===
After the 1860 census, Massachusetts lost one seat.

Congress	District									
Congress	1st	2nd	3rd	4th	5th	6th	7th	8th	9th	10th
38th (1863–1865)	Thomas D. Eliot (R)	Oakes; Ames (R)	Alexander; H. Rice (R)	Samuel; Hooper (R)	John B. Alley (R)	Daniel W. Gooch (R)	George S. Boutwell (R)	John D. Baldwin (R)	William B. Washburn (R)	Henry L. Dawes (R)
39th (1865–1867)	Thomas D. Eliot (R)	Oakes; Ames (R)	Alexander; H. Rice (R)	Samuel; Hooper (R)	John B. Alley (R)	Daniel W. Gooch (R)	George S. Boutwell (R)	John D. Baldwin (R)	William B. Washburn (R)	Henry L. Dawes (R)
39th (1865–1867)	Thomas D. Eliot (R)	Oakes; Ames (R)	Alexander; H. Rice (R)	Samuel; Hooper (R)	John B. Alley (R)	Nathaniel P. Banks (R)	George S. Boutwell (R)	John D. Baldwin (R)	William B. Washburn (R)	Henry L. Dawes (R)
40th (1867–1869)	Thomas D. Eliot (R)	Oakes; Ames (R)	Ginery; Twichell (R)	Samuel; Hooper (R)	Benjamin; Butler (R)	Nathaniel P. Banks (R)	George S. Boutwell (R)	John D. Baldwin (R)	William B. Washburn (R)	Henry L. Dawes (R)
41st (1869–1871)	James; Buffington (R)	Oakes; Ames (R)	Ginery; Twichell (R)	Samuel; Hooper (R)	Benjamin; Butler (R)	Nathaniel P. Banks (R)	George S. Boutwell (R)	George F. Hoar (R)	William B. Washburn (R)	Henry L. Dawes (R)
41st (1869–1871)	James; Buffington (R)	Oakes; Ames (R)	Ginery; Twichell (R)	Samuel; Hooper (R)	Benjamin; Butler (R)	Nathaniel P. Banks (R)	George M. Brooks (R)	George F. Hoar (R)	William B. Washburn (R)	Henry L. Dawes (R)
42nd (1871–1873)	James; Buffington (R)	Oakes; Ames (R)	Ginery; Twichell (R)	Samuel; Hooper (R)	Benjamin; Butler (R)	Nathaniel P. Banks (R)	George M. Brooks (R)	George F. Hoar (R)	William B. Washburn (R)	Henry L. Dawes (R)
42nd (1871–1873)	James; Buffington (R)	Oakes; Ames (R)	Ginery; Twichell (R)	Samuel; Hooper (R)	Benjamin; Butler (R)	Nathaniel P. Banks (R)	Constantine Esty (R)	George F. Hoar (R)	Alvah Crocker (R)	Henry L. Dawes (R)

=== 1873 to 1883: 11 seats ===
After the 1870 census, Massachusetts gained one seat.

Congress	District										
Congress	1st	2nd	3rd	4th	5th	6th	7th	8th	9th	10th	11th
43rd (1873–1875)	James; Buffington (R)	Benjamin W. Harris (R)	William Whiting (R)	Samuel; Hooper (R)	Daniel W. Gooch (R)	Benjamin; Butler (R)	Ebenezer R. Hoar (R)	John M. S. Williams (R)	George F. Hoar (R)	Alvah Crocker (R)	Henry L. Dawes (R)
43rd (1873–1875)	James; Buffington (R)	Benjamin W. Harris (R)	Henry L. Pierce (R)	Samuel; Hooper (R)	Daniel W. Gooch (R)	Benjamin; Butler (R)	Ebenezer R. Hoar (R)	John M. S. Williams (R)	George F. Hoar (R)	Charles Stevens (R)	Henry L. Dawes (R)
44th (1875–1877)	James; Buffington (R)	Benjamin W. Harris (R)	Henry L. Pierce (R)	Rufus Frost (R)	Nathaniel P. Banks (I)	Charles Perkins; Thompson (D)	John K. Tarbox (D)	William W. Warren (D)	George F. Hoar (R)	Julius Hawley; Seelye (I)	Chester W. Chapin (D)
44th (1875–1877)	William W. Crapo (R)	Benjamin W. Harris (R)	Henry L. Pierce (R)	Josiah Abbott (D)	Nathaniel P. Banks (I)	Charles Perkins; Thompson (D)	John K. Tarbox (D)	William W. Warren (D)	George F. Hoar (R)	Julius Hawley; Seelye (I)	Chester W. Chapin (D)
45th (1877–1879)	William W. Crapo (R)	Benjamin W. Harris (R)	Walbridge Field (R)	Leopold; Morse (D)	Nathaniel P. Banks (R)	George B. Loring (R)	Benjamin; Butler (R)	William; Claflin (R)	William W. Rice (R)	Amasa; Norcross (R)	George; Robinson (R)
45th (1877–1879)	William W. Crapo (R)	Benjamin W. Harris (R)	Benjamin Dean (D)	Leopold; Morse (D)	Nathaniel P. Banks (R)	George B. Loring (R)	Benjamin; Butler (R)	William; Claflin (R)	William W. Rice (R)	Amasa; Norcross (R)	George; Robinson (R)
46th (1879–1881)	William W. Crapo (R)	Benjamin W. Harris (R)	Walbridge Field (R)	Leopold; Morse (D)	Selwyn Z. Bowman (R)	George B. Loring (R)	William A. Russell (R)	William; Claflin (R)	William W. Rice (R)	Amasa; Norcross (R)	George; Robinson (R)
47th (1881–1883)	William W. Crapo (R)	Benjamin W. Harris (R)	Ambrose; Ranney (R)	Leopold; Morse (D)	Selwyn Z. Bowman (R)	Eben F. Stone (R)	William A. Russell (R)	John W. Candler (R)	William W. Rice (R)	Amasa; Norcross (R)	George; Robinson (R)

=== 1883 to 1893: 12 seats ===
After the 1880 census, Massachusetts gained one seat.

Congress	District											
Congress	1st	2nd	3rd	4th	5th	6th	7th	8th	9th	10th	11th	12th
48th (1883–1885)	Robert T. Davis (R)	John Davis; Long (R)	Ambrose; Ranney (R)	Patrick; Collins (D)	Leopold; Morse (D)	Henry B. Lovering (D)	Eben F. Stone (R)	William A. Russell (R)	Theodore; Lyman III (IR)	William W. Rice (R)	William; Whiting II (R)	George Robinson (R)
48th (1883–1885)	Robert T. Davis (R)	John Davis; Long (R)	Ambrose; Ranney (R)	Patrick; Collins (D)	Leopold; Morse (D)	Henry B. Lovering (D)	Eben F. Stone (R)	William A. Russell (R)	Theodore; Lyman III (IR)	William W. Rice (R)	William; Whiting II (R)	Francis W. Rockwell (R)
49th (1885–1887)	Robert T. Davis (R)	John Davis; Long (R)	Ambrose; Ranney (R)	Patrick; Collins (D)	Edward D. Hayden (R)	Henry B. Lovering (D)	Eben F. Stone (R)	Charles H. Allen (R)	Frederick; D. Ely (R)	William W. Rice (R)	William; Whiting II (R)	Francis W. Rockwell (R)
50th (1887–1889)	Robert T. Davis (R)	John Davis; Long (R)	Leopold; Morse (D)	Patrick; Collins (D)	Edward D. Hayden (R)	Henry Cabot; Lodge (R)	William; Cogswell (R)	Charles H. Allen (R)	Edward; Burnett (D)	John E. Russell (D)	William; Whiting II (R)	Francis W. Rockwell (R)
51st (1889–1891)	Charles S. Randall (R)	Elijah A. Morse (R)	John F. Andrew (D)	Joseph H. O'Neil (D)	Nathaniel P. Banks (R)	Henry Cabot; Lodge (R)	William; Cogswell (R)	Frederic T. Greenhalge (R)	John W. Candler (R)	Joseph H. Walker (R)	Rodney; Wallace (R)	Francis W. Rockwell (R)
52nd (1891–1893)	Charles S. Randall (R)	Elijah A. Morse (R)	John F. Andrew (D)	Joseph H. O'Neil (D)	Sherman; Hoar (D)	Henry Cabot; Lodge (R)	William; Cogswell (R)	Moses T. Stevens (D)	George F. Williams (D)	Joseph H. Walker (R)	Frederick S. Coolidge (D)	John Crawford; Crosby (D)

=== 1893 to 1903: 13 seats ===
After the 1890 census, Massachusetts gained one seat.

Congress	District												
Congress	1st	2nd	3rd	4th	5th	6th	7th	8th	9th	10th	11th	12th	13th
53rd (1893–1895)	Ashley B. Wright (R)	Frederick H. Gillett (R)	Joseph H. Walker (R)	Lewis D. Apsley (R)	Moses T. Stevens (D)	William; Cogswell (R)	William; Everett (D)	Samuel W. McCall (R)	Joseph H. O'Neil (D)	Michael J. McEttrick (ID)	William Franklin; Draper (R)	Elijah A. Morse (R)	Charles S. Randall (R)
54th (1895–1897)	Ashley B. Wright (R)	Frederick H. Gillett (R)	Joseph H. Walker (R)	Lewis D. Apsley (R)	William S. Knox (R)	William; Cogswell (R)	William; Emerson; Barrett (R)	Samuel W. McCall (R)	John F. Fitzgerald (D)	Harrison H. Atwood (R)	William Franklin; Draper (R)	Elijah A. Morse (R)	John; Simpkins (R)
54th (1895–1897)	Ashley B. Wright (R)	Frederick H. Gillett (R)	Joseph H. Walker (R)	Lewis D. Apsley (R)	William S. Knox (R)	William Henry; Moody (R)	William; Emerson; Barrett (R)	Samuel W. McCall (R)	John F. Fitzgerald (D)	Harrison H. Atwood (R)	William Franklin; Draper (R)	Elijah A. Morse (R)	John; Simpkins (R)
55th (1897–1899)	Ashley B. Wright (R)	Frederick H. Gillett (R)	Joseph H. Walker (R)	George W. Weymouth (R)	William S. Knox (R)	William Henry; Moody (R)	William; Emerson; Barrett (R)	Samuel W. McCall (R)	John F. Fitzgerald (D)	Samuel J. Barrows (R)	Charles F. Sprague (R)	William C. Lovering (R)	John; Simpkins (R)
55th (1897–1899)	George P. Lawrence (R)	Frederick H. Gillett (R)	Joseph H. Walker (R)	George W. Weymouth (R)	William S. Knox (R)	William Henry; Moody (R)	William; Emerson; Barrett (R)	Samuel W. McCall (R)	John F. Fitzgerald (D)	Samuel J. Barrows (R)	Charles F. Sprague (R)	William C. Lovering (R)	William S. Greene (R)
56th (1899–1901)	George P. Lawrence (R)	Frederick H. Gillett (R)	John R. Thayer (D)	George W. Weymouth (R)	William S. Knox (R)	William Henry; Moody (R)	Ernest W. Roberts (R)	Samuel W. McCall (R)	John F. Fitzgerald (D)	Henry F. Naphen (D)	Charles F. Sprague (R)	William C. Lovering (R)	William S. Greene (R)
57th (1901–1903)	George P. Lawrence (R)	Frederick H. Gillett (R)	John R. Thayer (D)	Charles Q. Tirrell (R)	William S. Knox (R)	William Henry; Moody (R)	Ernest W. Roberts (R)	Samuel W. McCall (R)	Joseph A. Conry (D)	Henry F. Naphen (D)	Samuel; Powers (R)	William C. Lovering (R)	William S. Greene (R)
57th (1901–1903)	George P. Lawrence (R)	Frederick H. Gillett (R)	John R. Thayer (D)	Charles Q. Tirrell (R)	William S. Knox (R)	Augustus P. Gardner (R)	Ernest W. Roberts (R)	Samuel W. McCall (R)	Joseph A. Conry (D)	Henry F. Naphen (D)	Samuel; Powers (R)	William C. Lovering (R)	William S. Greene (R)

=== 1903 to 1913: 14 seats ===
After the 1900 census, Massachusetts gained one seat.

Congress	District													
Congress	1st	2nd	3rd	4th	5th	6th	7th	8th	9th	10th	11th	12th	13th	14th
58th (1903–1905)	George P. Lawrence (R)	Frederick H. Gillett (R)	John Thayer (D)	Charles Q. Tirrell (R)	Butler; Ames (R)	Augustus; P. Gardner (R)	Ernest W. Roberts (R)	Samuel W. McCall (R)	John A. Keliher (D)	William S. McNary (D)	John; Andrew; Sullivan (D)	Samuel Powers (R)	William S. Greene (R)	William C. Lovering (R)
59th (1905–1907)	George P. Lawrence (R)	Frederick H. Gillett (R)	Rockwood Hoar (R)	Charles Q. Tirrell (R)	Butler; Ames (R)	Augustus; P. Gardner (R)	Ernest W. Roberts (R)	Samuel W. McCall (R)	John A. Keliher (D)	William S. McNary (D)	John; Andrew; Sullivan (D)	John W. Weeks (R)	William S. Greene (R)	William C. Lovering (R)
59th (1905–1907)	George P. Lawrence (R)	Frederick H. Gillett (R)	Charles G. Washburn (R)	Charles Q. Tirrell (R)	Butler; Ames (R)	Augustus; P. Gardner (R)	Ernest W. Roberts (R)	Samuel W. McCall (R)	John A. Keliher (D)	William S. McNary (D)	John; Andrew; Sullivan (D)	John W. Weeks (R)	William S. Greene (R)	William C. Lovering (R)
60th (1907–1909)	George P. Lawrence (R)	Frederick H. Gillett (R)	Charles G. Washburn (R)	Charles Q. Tirrell (R)	Butler; Ames (R)	Augustus; P. Gardner (R)	Ernest W. Roberts (R)	Samuel W. McCall (R)	John A. Keliher (D)	Joseph F. O'Connell (D)	Andrew J. Peters (D)	John W. Weeks (R)	William S. Greene (R)	William C. Lovering (R)
61st (1909–1911)	George P. Lawrence (R)	Frederick H. Gillett (R)	Charles G. Washburn (R)	Charles Q. Tirrell (R)	Butler; Ames (R)	Augustus; P. Gardner (R)	Ernest W. Roberts (R)	Samuel W. McCall (R)	John A. Keliher (D)	Joseph F. O'Connell (D)	Andrew J. Peters (D)	John W. Weeks (R)	William S. Greene (R)	William C. Lovering (R)
61st (1909–1911)	George P. Lawrence (R)	Frederick H. Gillett (R)	Charles G. Washburn (R)	John Mitchell (D)	Butler; Ames (R)	Augustus; P. Gardner (R)	Ernest W. Roberts (R)	Samuel W. McCall (R)	John A. Keliher (D)	Joseph F. O'Connell (D)	Andrew J. Peters (D)	John W. Weeks (R)	William S. Greene (R)	Eugene Foss (D)
62nd (1911–1913)	George P. Lawrence (R)	Frederick H. Gillett (R)	John A. Thayer (D)	William Wilder (R)	Butler; Ames (R)	Augustus; P. Gardner (R)	Ernest W. Roberts (R)	Samuel W. McCall (R)	Wm. F. Murray (D)	James Curley (D)	Andrew J. Peters (D)	John W. Weeks (R)	William S. Greene (R)	Robert Harris (R)

=== 1913 to 1933: 16 seats ===
After the 1910 census, Massachusetts gained two seats. There was no reapportionment after the 1920 census.

Congress	District															
Congress	1st	2nd	3rd	4th	5th	6th	7th	8th	9th	10th	11th	12th	13th	14th	15th	16th
63rd (1913–1915)	Allen; T. Treadway (R)	Frederick H. Gillett (R)	William Wilder (R)	Samuel; Winslow (R)	John; Jacob; Rogers (R)	Augustus; P. Gardner (R)	Michael; Francis; Phelan (D)	Frederick S. Deitrick (D)	Ernest; W. Roberts (R)	William F. Murray (D)	Andrew J. Peters (D)	James Curley (D)	John Weeks (R)	Edward; Gilmore (D)	William S. Greene (R)	Thomas C. Thacher (D)
63rd (1913–1915)	Allen; T. Treadway (R)	Frederick H. Gillett (R)	Calvin; Page (R)	Samuel; Winslow (R)	John; Jacob; Rogers (R)	Augustus; P. Gardner (R)	Michael; Francis; Phelan (D)	Frederick S. Deitrick (D)	Ernest; W. Roberts (R)	William F. Murray (D)	Andrew J. Peters (D)	James; A. Gallivan (D)	John Mitchell (D)	Edward; Gilmore (D)	William S. Greene (R)	Thomas C. Thacher (D)
64th (1915–1917)	Allen; T. Treadway (R)	Frederick H. Gillett (R)	Calvin; Page (R)	Samuel; Winslow (R)	John; Jacob; Rogers (R)	Augustus; P. Gardner (R)	Michael; Francis; Phelan (D)	Frederick; W. Dallinger (R)	Ernest; W. Roberts (R)	Peter; Francis; Tague (D)	George; H. Tinkham (R)	James; A. Gallivan (D)	William; Henry; Carter (R)	Richard; Olney; II (D)	William S. Greene (R)	Joseph; Walsh (R)
65th (1917–1919)	Allen; T. Treadway (R)	Frederick H. Gillett (R)	Calvin; Page (R)	Samuel; Winslow (R)	John; Jacob; Rogers (R)	Augustus; P. Gardner (R)	Michael; Francis; Phelan (D)	Frederick; W. Dallinger (R)	Alvan T. Fuller (R)	Peter; Francis; Tague (D)	George; H. Tinkham (R)	James; A. Gallivan (D)	William; Henry; Carter (R)	Richard; Olney; II (D)	William S. Greene (R)	Joseph; Walsh (R)
65th (1917–1919)	Allen; T. Treadway (R)	Frederick H. Gillett (R)	Calvin; Page (R)	Samuel; Winslow (R)	John; Jacob; Rogers (R)	Willfred; W. Lufkin (R)	Michael; Francis; Phelan (D)	Frederick; W. Dallinger (R)	Alvan T. Fuller (R)	Peter; Francis; Tague (D)	George; H. Tinkham (R)	James; A. Gallivan (D)	William; Henry; Carter (R)	Richard; Olney; II (D)	William S. Greene (R)	Joseph; Walsh (R)
66th (1919–1921)	Allen; T. Treadway (R)	Frederick H. Gillett (R)	Calvin; Page (R)	Samuel; Winslow (R)	John; Jacob; Rogers (R)	Willfred; W. Lufkin (R)	Michael; Francis; Phelan (D)	Frederick; W. Dallinger (R)	Alvan T. Fuller (R)	Peter; Francis; Tague (D)	George; H. Tinkham (R)	James; A. Gallivan (D)	Robert; Luce (R)	Richard; Olney; II (D)	William S. Greene (R)	Joseph; Walsh (R)
66th (1919–1921)	Allen; T. Treadway (R)	Frederick H. Gillett (R)	Calvin; Page (R)	Samuel; Winslow (R)	John; Jacob; Rogers (R)	Willfred; W. Lufkin (R)	Michael; Francis; Phelan (D)	Frederick; W. Dallinger (R)	Alvan T. Fuller (R)	John Fitzgerald (D)	George; H. Tinkham (R)	James; A. Gallivan (D)	Robert; Luce (R)	Richard; Olney; II (D)	William S. Greene (R)	Joseph; Walsh (R)
67th (1921–1923)	Allen; T. Treadway (R)	Frederick H. Gillett (R)	Calvin; Page (R)	Samuel; Winslow (R)	John; Jacob; Rogers (R)	Willfred; W. Lufkin (R)	Robert S. Maloney (R)	Frederick; W. Dallinger (R)	Charles; L. Underhill (R)	Peter; Francis; Tague (D)	George; H. Tinkham (R)	James; A. Gallivan (D)	Robert; Luce (R)	Louis A. Frothingham (R)	William S. Greene (R)	Joseph; Walsh (R)
67th (1921–1923)	Allen; T. Treadway (R)	Frederick H. Gillett (R)	Calvin; Page (R)	Samuel; Winslow (R)	John; Jacob; Rogers (R)	A. Piatt; Andrew (R)	Robert S. Maloney (R)	Frederick; W. Dallinger (R)	Charles; L. Underhill (R)	Peter; Francis; Tague (D)	George; H. Tinkham (R)	James; A. Gallivan (D)	Robert; Luce (R)	Louis A. Frothingham (R)	William S. Greene (R)	Charles; L. Gifford (R)
68th (1923–1925)	Allen; T. Treadway (R)	Frederick H. Gillett (R)	Calvin; Page (R)	Samuel; Winslow (R)	John; Jacob; Rogers (R)	A. Piatt; Andrew (R)	William P. Connery Jr. (D)	Frederick; W. Dallinger (R)	Charles; L. Underhill (R)	Peter; Francis; Tague (D)	George; H. Tinkham (R)	James; A. Gallivan (D)	Robert; Luce (R)	Louis A. Frothingham (R)	William S. Greene (R)	Charles; L. Gifford (R)
68th (1923–1925)	Allen; T. Treadway (R)	Frederick H. Gillett (R)	Calvin; Page (R)	Samuel; Winslow (R)	John; Jacob; Rogers (R)	A. Piatt; Andrew (R)	William P. Connery Jr. (D)	Frederick; W. Dallinger (R)	Charles; L. Underhill (R)	Peter; Francis; Tague (D)	George; H. Tinkham (R)	James; A. Gallivan (D)	Robert; Luce (R)	Louis A. Frothingham (R)	Robert Leach (R)	Charles; L. Gifford (R)
69th (1925–1927)	Allen; T. Treadway (R)	George Churchill (R)	Frank H. Foss (R)	George R. Stobbs (R)	John; Jacob; Rogers (R)	A. Piatt; Andrew (R)	William P. Connery Jr. (D)	Harry I. Thayer (R)	Charles; L. Underhill (R)	John J. Douglass (D)	George; H. Tinkham (R)	James; A. Gallivan (D)	Robert; Luce (R)	Louis A. Frothingham (R)	Joseph W. Martin; Jr. (R)	Charles; L. Gifford (R)
69th (1925–1927)	Allen; T. Treadway (R)	Henry L. Bowles (R)	Frank H. Foss (R)	George R. Stobbs (R)	Edith; Nourse; Rogers (R)	A. Piatt; Andrew (R)	William P. Connery Jr. (D)	Harry I. Thayer (R)	Charles; L. Underhill (R)	John J. Douglass (D)	George; H. Tinkham (R)	James; A. Gallivan (D)	Robert; Luce (R)	Louis A. Frothingham (R)	Joseph W. Martin; Jr. (R)	Charles; L. Gifford (R)
70th (1927–1929)	Allen; T. Treadway (R)	Henry L. Bowles (R)	Frank H. Foss (R)	George R. Stobbs (R)	Edith; Nourse; Rogers (R)	A. Piatt; Andrew (R)	William P. Connery Jr. (D)	Frederick; W. Dallinger (R)	Charles; L. Underhill (R)	John J. Douglass (D)	George; H. Tinkham (R)	James; A. Gallivan (D)	Robert; Luce (R)	Louis A. Frothingham (R)	Joseph W. Martin; Jr. (R)	Charles; L. Gifford (R)
71st (1929–1931)	Allen; T. Treadway (R)	Will Kaynor (R)	Frank H. Foss (R)	George R. Stobbs (R)	Edith; Nourse; Rogers (R)	A. Piatt; Andrew (R)	William P. Connery Jr. (D)	Frederick; W. Dallinger (R)	Charles; L. Underhill (R)	John J. Douglass (D)	George; H. Tinkham (R)	John W. McCormack (D)	Robert; Luce (R)	Dick; Wigglesworth (R)	Joseph W. Martin; Jr. (R)	Charles; L. Gifford (R)
71st (1929–1931)	Allen; T. Treadway (R)	William J. Granfield (D)	Frank H. Foss (R)	George R. Stobbs (R)	Edith; Nourse; Rogers (R)	A. Piatt; Andrew (R)	William P. Connery Jr. (D)	Frederick; W. Dallinger (R)	Charles; L. Underhill (R)	John J. Douglass (D)	George; H. Tinkham (R)	John W. McCormack (D)	Robert; Luce (R)	Dick; Wigglesworth (R)	Joseph W. Martin; Jr. (R)	Charles; L. Gifford (R)
72nd (1931–1933)	Allen; T. Treadway (R)	William J. Granfield (D)	Frank H. Foss (R)	Pehr G. Holmes (R)	Edith; Nourse; Rogers (R)	A. Piatt; Andrew (R)	William P. Connery Jr. (D)	Frederick; W. Dallinger (R)	Charles; L. Underhill (R)	John J. Douglass (D)	George; H. Tinkham (R)	John W. McCormack (D)	Robert; Luce (R)	Dick; Wigglesworth (R)	Joseph W. Martin; Jr. (R)	Charles; L. Gifford (R)

=== 1933 to 1963: 15, then 14 seats ===
After the 1930 census, Massachusetts lost one seat. After the 1940 census, Massachusetts lost another seat. Massachusetts kept its apportionment following the 1950 census.

Congress	District														
Congress	1st	2nd	3rd	4th	5th	6th	7th	8th	9th	10th	11th	12th	13th	14th	15th
73rd (1933–1935)	Allen T. Treadway (R)	William J. Granfield (D)	Frank H. Foss (R)	Pehr G. Holmes (R)	Edith; Nourse; Rogers (R)	A. Piatt; Andrew (R)	William P. Connery; Jr. (D)	Arthur; Daniel; Healey (D)	Robert; Luce (R)	George H. Tinkham (R)	John J. Douglass (D)	John W. McCormack (D)	Dick; Wigglesworth (R)	Joseph W. Martin Jr. (R)	Charles L. Gifford (R)
74th (1935–1937)	Allen T. Treadway (R)	William J. Granfield (D)	Joseph E. Casey (D)	Pehr G. Holmes (R)	Edith; Nourse; Rogers (R)	A. Piatt; Andrew (R)	William P. Connery; Jr. (D)	Arthur; Daniel; Healey (D)	Richard M. Russell (D)	George H. Tinkham (R)	John P. Higgins (D)	John W. McCormack (D)	Dick; Wigglesworth (R)	Joseph W. Martin Jr. (R)	Charles L. Gifford (R)
74th (1935–1937)	Allen T. Treadway (R)	William J. Granfield (D)	Joseph E. Casey (D)	Pehr G. Holmes (R)	Edith; Nourse; Rogers (R)	vacant	William P. Connery; Jr. (D)	Arthur; Daniel; Healey (D)	Richard M. Russell (D)	George H. Tinkham (R)	John P. Higgins (D)	John W. McCormack (D)	Dick; Wigglesworth (R)	Joseph W. Martin Jr. (R)	Charles L. Gifford (R)
75th (1937–1939)	Allen T. Treadway (R)	Charles R. Clason (R)	Joseph E. Casey (D)	Pehr G. Holmes (R)	Edith; Nourse; Rogers (R)	George J. Bates (R)	William P. Connery; Jr. (D)	Arthur; Daniel; Healey (D)	Robert; Luce (R)	George H. Tinkham (R)	John P. Higgins (D)	John W. McCormack (D)	Dick; Wigglesworth (R)	Joseph W. Martin Jr. (R)	Charles L. Gifford (R)
75th (1937–1939)	Allen T. Treadway (R)	Charles R. Clason (R)	Joseph E. Casey (D)	Pehr G. Holmes (R)	Edith; Nourse; Rogers (R)	George J. Bates (R)	Lawrence J. Connery (D)	Arthur; Daniel; Healey (D)	Robert; Luce (R)	George H. Tinkham (R)	Thomas A. Flaherty (D)	John W. McCormack (D)	Dick; Wigglesworth (R)	Joseph W. Martin Jr. (R)	Charles L. Gifford (R)
76th (1939–1941)	Allen T. Treadway (R)	Charles R. Clason (R)	Joseph E. Casey (D)	Pehr G. Holmes (R)	Edith; Nourse; Rogers (R)	George J. Bates (R)	Lawrence J. Connery (D)	Arthur; Daniel; Healey (D)	Robert; Luce (R)	George H. Tinkham (R)	Thomas A. Flaherty (D)	John W. McCormack (D)	Dick; Wigglesworth (R)	Joseph W. Martin Jr. (R)	Charles L. Gifford (R)
77th (1941–1943)	Allen T. Treadway (R)	Charles R. Clason (R)	Joseph E. Casey (D)	Pehr G. Holmes (R)	Edith; Nourse; Rogers (R)	George J. Bates (R)	Lawrence J. Connery (D)	Arthur; Daniel; Healey (D)	Thomas H. Eliot (D)	George H. Tinkham (R)	Thomas A. Flaherty (D)	John W. McCormack (D)	Dick; Wigglesworth (R)	Joseph W. Martin Jr. (R)	Charles L. Gifford (R)
77th (1941–1943)	Allen T. Treadway (R)	Charles R. Clason (R)	Joseph E. Casey (D)	Pehr G. Holmes (R)	Edith; Nourse; Rogers (R)	George J. Bates (R)	Thomas; Lane (D)	vacant	Thomas H. Eliot (D)	George H. Tinkham (R)	Thomas A. Flaherty (D)	John W. McCormack (D)	Dick; Wigglesworth (R)	Joseph W. Martin Jr. (R)	Charles L. Gifford (R)
78th (1943–1945)	Allen T. Treadway (R)	Charles R. Clason (R)	Philip J. Philbin (D)	Pehr G. Holmes (R)	Edith; Nourse; Rogers (R)	George J. Bates (R)	Thomas; Lane (D)	Angier; Goodwin (R)	Charles L. Gifford (R)	Christian; Herter (R)	James; Michael; Curley (D)	John W. McCormack (D)	Dick; Wigglesworth (R)	Joseph W. Martin Jr. (R)	
79th (1945–1947)	John W. Heselton (R)	Charles R. Clason (R)	Philip J. Philbin (D)	Pehr G. Holmes (R)	Edith; Nourse; Rogers (R)	George J. Bates (R)	Thomas; Lane (D)	Angier; Goodwin (R)	Charles L. Gifford (R)	Christian; Herter (R)	James; Michael; Curley (D)	John W. McCormack (D)	Dick; Wigglesworth (R)	Joseph W. Martin Jr. (R)	
80th (1947–1949)	John W. Heselton (R)	Charles R. Clason (R)	Philip J. Philbin (D)	Harold; Donohue (D)	Edith; Nourse; Rogers (R)	George J. Bates (R)	Thomas; Lane (D)	Angier; Goodwin (R)	Charles L. Gifford (R)	Christian; Herter (R)	John F. Kennedy (D)	John W. McCormack (D)	Dick; Wigglesworth (R)	Joseph W. Martin Jr. (R)	
80th (1947–1949)	John W. Heselton (R)	Charles R. Clason (R)	Philip J. Philbin (D)	Harold; Donohue (D)	Edith; Nourse; Rogers (R)	George J. Bates (R)	Thomas; Lane (D)	Angier; Goodwin (R)	Donald W. Nicholson (R)	Christian; Herter (R)	John F. Kennedy (D)	John W. McCormack (D)	Dick; Wigglesworth (R)	Joseph W. Martin Jr. (R)	
81st (1949–1951)	John W. Heselton (R)	Foster; Furcolo (D)	Philip J. Philbin (D)	Harold; Donohue (D)	Edith; Nourse; Rogers (R)	George J. Bates (R)	Thomas; Lane (D)	Angier; Goodwin (R)	Donald W. Nicholson (R)	Christian; Herter (R)	John F. Kennedy (D)	John W. McCormack (D)	Dick; Wigglesworth (R)	Joseph W. Martin Jr. (R)	
81st (1949–1951)	John W. Heselton (R)	Foster; Furcolo (D)	Philip J. Philbin (D)	Harold; Donohue (D)	Edith; Nourse; Rogers (R)	William H. Bates (R)	Thomas; Lane (D)	Angier; Goodwin (R)	Donald W. Nicholson (R)	Christian; Herter (R)	John F. Kennedy (D)	John W. McCormack (D)	Dick; Wigglesworth (R)	Joseph W. Martin Jr. (R)	
82nd (1951–1953)	John W. Heselton (R)	Foster; Furcolo (D)	Philip J. Philbin (D)	Harold; Donohue (D)	Edith; Nourse; Rogers (R)	William H. Bates (R)	Thomas; Lane (D)	Angier; Goodwin (R)	Donald W. Nicholson (R)	Christian; Herter (R)	John F. Kennedy (D)	John W. McCormack (D)	Dick; Wigglesworth (R)	Joseph W. Martin Jr. (R)	
82nd (1951–1953)	John W. Heselton (R)	vacant	Philip J. Philbin (D)	Harold; Donohue (D)	Edith; Nourse; Rogers (R)	William H. Bates (R)	Thomas; Lane (D)	Angier; Goodwin (R)	Donald W. Nicholson (R)	Christian; Herter (R)	John F. Kennedy (D)	John W. McCormack (D)	Dick; Wigglesworth (R)	Joseph W. Martin Jr. (R)	
83rd (1953–1955)	John W. Heselton (R)	Ed; Boland (D)	Philip J. Philbin (D)	Harold; Donohue (D)	Edith; Nourse; Rogers (R)	William H. Bates (R)	Thomas; Lane (D)	Angier; Goodwin (R)	Donald W. Nicholson (R)	Laurence; Curtis (R)	Tip; O'Neill (D)	John W. McCormack (D)	Dick; Wigglesworth (R)	Joseph W. Martin Jr. (R)	
84th (1955–1957)	John W. Heselton (R)	Ed; Boland (D)	Philip J. Philbin (D)	Harold; Donohue (D)	Edith; Nourse; Rogers (R)	William H. Bates (R)	Thomas; Lane (D)	Torbert; Macdonald (D)	Donald W. Nicholson (R)	Laurence; Curtis (R)	Tip; O'Neill (D)	John W. McCormack (D)	Dick; Wigglesworth (R)	Joseph W. Martin Jr. (R)	
85th (1957–1959)	John W. Heselton (R)	Ed; Boland (D)	Philip J. Philbin (D)	Harold; Donohue (D)	Edith; Nourse; Rogers (R)	William H. Bates (R)	Thomas; Lane (D)	Torbert; Macdonald (D)	Donald W. Nicholson (R)	Laurence; Curtis (R)	Tip; O'Neill (D)	John W. McCormack (D)	Dick; Wigglesworth (R)	Joseph W. Martin Jr. (R)	
85th (1957–1959)	John W. Heselton (R)	Ed; Boland (D)	Philip J. Philbin (D)	Harold; Donohue (D)	Edith; Nourse; Rogers (R)	William H. Bates (R)	Thomas; Lane (D)	Torbert; Macdonald (D)	Donald W. Nicholson (R)	Laurence; Curtis (R)	Tip; O'Neill (D)	John W. McCormack (D)	vacant	Joseph W. Martin Jr. (R)	
86th (1959–1961)	Silvio O. Conte (R)	Ed; Boland (D)	Philip J. Philbin (D)	Harold; Donohue (D)	Edith; Nourse; Rogers (R)	William H. Bates (R)	Thomas; Lane (D)	Torbert; Macdonald (D)	Hastings; Keith (R)	Laurence; Curtis (R)	Tip; O'Neill (D)	John W. McCormack (D)	James A. Burke (D)	Joseph W. Martin Jr. (R)	
86th (1959–1961)	Silvio O. Conte (R)	Ed; Boland (D)	Philip J. Philbin (D)	Harold; Donohue (D)	vacant	William H. Bates (R)	Thomas; Lane (D)	Torbert; Macdonald (D)	Hastings; Keith (R)	Laurence; Curtis (R)	Tip; O'Neill (D)	John W. McCormack (D)	James A. Burke (D)	Joseph W. Martin Jr. (R)	
87th (1961–1963)	Silvio O. Conte (R)	Ed; Boland (D)	Philip J. Philbin (D)	Harold; Donohue (D)	F. Bradford; Morse (R)	William H. Bates (R)	Thomas; Lane (D)	Torbert; Macdonald (D)	Hastings; Keith (R)	Laurence; Curtis (R)	Tip; O'Neill (D)	John W. McCormack (D)	James A. Burke (D)	Joseph W. Martin Jr. (R)	

=== 1963 to 1983: 12 seats ===
After the 1960 census, Massachusetts lost two seats. Massachusetts kept its apportionment after the 1970 census.

Congress	District											
Congress	1st	2nd	3rd	4th	5th	6th	7th	8th	9th	10th	11th	12th
88th (1963–1965)	Silvio O. Conte (R)	Ed; Boland (D)	Philip J. Philbin (D)	Harold; Donohue (D)	F. Bradford; Morse (R)	William H. Bates (R)	Torbert; Macdonald (D)	Tip; O'Neill (D)	John W. McCormack (D)	Joseph W. Martin Jr. (R)	James A. Burke (D)	Hastings; Keith (R)
89th (1965–1967)	Silvio O. Conte (R)	Ed; Boland (D)	Philip J. Philbin (D)	Harold; Donohue (D)	F. Bradford; Morse (R)	William H. Bates (R)	Torbert; Macdonald (D)	Tip; O'Neill (D)	John W. McCormack (D)	Joseph W. Martin Jr. (R)	James A. Burke (D)	Hastings; Keith (R)
90th (1967–1969)	Silvio O. Conte (R)	Ed; Boland (D)	Philip J. Philbin (D)	Harold; Donohue (D)	F. Bradford; Morse (R)	William H. Bates (R)	Torbert; Macdonald (D)	Tip; O'Neill (D)	John W. McCormack (D)	Margaret; Heckler (R)	James A. Burke (D)	Hastings; Keith (R)
91st (1969–1971)	Silvio O. Conte (R)	Ed; Boland (D)	Philip J. Philbin (D)	Harold; Donohue (D)	F. Bradford; Morse (R)	William H. Bates (R)	Torbert; Macdonald (D)	Tip; O'Neill (D)	John W. McCormack (D)	Margaret; Heckler (R)	James A. Burke (D)	Hastings; Keith (R)
91st (1969–1971)	Silvio O. Conte (R)	Ed; Boland (D)	Philip J. Philbin (D)	Harold; Donohue (D)	F. Bradford; Morse (R)	Mike; Harrington (D)	Torbert; Macdonald (D)	Tip; O'Neill (D)	John W. McCormack (D)	Margaret; Heckler (R)	James A. Burke (D)	Hastings; Keith (R)
92nd (1971–1973)	Silvio O. Conte (R)	Ed; Boland (D)	Robert; Drinan (D)	Harold; Donohue (D)	F. Bradford; Morse (R)	Mike; Harrington (D)	Torbert; Macdonald (D)	Tip; O'Neill (D)	Louise Day; Hicks (D)	Margaret; Heckler (R)	James A. Burke (D)	Hastings; Keith (R)
92nd (1971–1973)	Silvio O. Conte (R)	Ed; Boland (D)	Robert; Drinan (D)	Harold; Donohue (D)	vacant	Mike; Harrington (D)	Torbert; Macdonald (D)	Tip; O'Neill (D)	Louise Day; Hicks (D)	Margaret; Heckler (R)	James A. Burke (D)	Hastings; Keith (R)
93rd (1973–1975)	Silvio O. Conte (R)	Ed; Boland (D)	Harold; Donohue (D)	Robert; Drinan (D)	Paul W. Cronin (R)	Mike; Harrington (D)	Torbert; Macdonald (D)	Tip; O'Neill (D)	Joe; Moakley (D)	Margaret; Heckler (R)	James A. Burke (D)	Gerry; Studds (D)
93rd (1973–1975)	Silvio O. Conte (R)	Ed; Boland (D)	vacant	Robert; Drinan (D)	Paul W. Cronin (R)	Mike; Harrington (D)	Torbert; Macdonald (D)	Tip; O'Neill (D)	Joe; Moakley (D)	Margaret; Heckler (R)	James A. Burke (D)	Gerry; Studds (D)
94th (1975–1977)	Silvio O. Conte (R)	Ed; Boland (D)	Joseph; Early (D)	Robert; Drinan (D)	Paul; Tsongas (D)	Mike; Harrington (D)	Torbert; Macdonald (D)	Tip; O'Neill (D)	Joe; Moakley (D)	Margaret; Heckler (R)	James A. Burke (D)	Gerry; Studds (D)
94th (1975–1977)	Silvio O. Conte (R)	Ed; Boland (D)	Joseph; Early (D)	Robert; Drinan (D)	Paul; Tsongas (D)	Mike; Harrington (D)	Ed; Markey (D)	Tip; O'Neill (D)	Joe; Moakley (D)	Margaret; Heckler (R)	James A. Burke (D)	Gerry; Studds (D)
95th (1977–1979)	Silvio O. Conte (R)	Ed; Boland (D)	Joseph; Early (D)	Robert; Drinan (D)	Paul; Tsongas (D)	Mike; Harrington (D)	Ed; Markey (D)	Tip; O'Neill (D)	Joe; Moakley (D)	Margaret; Heckler (R)	James A. Burke (D)	Gerry; Studds (D)
96th (1979–1981)	Silvio O. Conte (R)	Ed; Boland (D)	Joseph; Early (D)	Robert; Drinan (D)	James; Shannon (D)	Nicholas; Mavroules (D)	Ed; Markey (D)	Tip; O'Neill (D)	Joe; Moakley (D)	Margaret; Heckler (R)	Brian J. Donnelly (D)	Gerry; Studds (D)
97th (1981–1983)	Silvio O. Conte (R)	Ed; Boland (D)	Joseph; Early (D)	Barney; Frank (D)	James; Shannon (D)	Nicholas; Mavroules (D)	Ed; Markey (D)	Tip; O'Neill (D)	Joe; Moakley (D)	Margaret; Heckler (R)	Brian J. Donnelly (D)	Gerry; Studds (D)

=== 1983 to 1993: 11 seats ===
After the 1980 census, Massachusetts lost one seat.

Congress	District										
Congress	1st	2nd	3rd	4th	5th	6th	7th	8th	9th	10th	11th
98th (1983–1985)	Silvio O. Conte (R)	Ed; Boland (D)	Joseph; Early (D)	Barney; Frank (D)	James; Shannon (D)	Nicholas; Mavroules (D)	Ed; Markey (D)	Tip; O'Neill (D)	Joe; Moakley (D)	Gerry; Studds (D)	Brian J. Donnelly (D)
99th (1985–1987)	Silvio O. Conte (R)	Ed; Boland (D)	Joseph; Early (D)	Barney; Frank (D)	Chester G. Atkins (D)	Nicholas; Mavroules (D)	Ed; Markey (D)	Tip; O'Neill (D)	Joe; Moakley (D)	Gerry; Studds (D)	Brian J. Donnelly (D)
100th (1987–1989)	Silvio O. Conte (R)	Ed; Boland (D)	Joseph; Early (D)	Barney; Frank (D)	Chester G. Atkins (D)	Nicholas; Mavroules (D)	Ed; Markey (D)	Joseph P. Kennedy II (D)	Joe; Moakley (D)	Gerry; Studds (D)	Brian J. Donnelly (D)
101st (1989–1991)	Silvio O. Conte (R)	Richard; Neal (D)	Joseph; Early (D)	Barney; Frank (D)	Chester G. Atkins (D)	Nicholas; Mavroules (D)	Ed; Markey (D)	Joseph P. Kennedy II (D)	Joe; Moakley (D)	Gerry; Studds (D)	Brian J. Donnelly (D)
102nd (1991–1993)	Silvio O. Conte (R)	Richard; Neal (D)	Joseph; Early (D)	Barney; Frank (D)	Chester G. Atkins (D)	Nicholas; Mavroules (D)	Ed; Markey (D)	Joseph P. Kennedy II (D)	Joe; Moakley (D)	Gerry; Studds (D)	Brian J. Donnelly (D)
102nd (1991–1993)	John Olver (D)	Richard; Neal (D)	Joseph; Early (D)	Barney; Frank (D)	Chester G. Atkins (D)	Nicholas; Mavroules (D)	Ed; Markey (D)	Joseph P. Kennedy II (D)	Joe; Moakley (D)	Gerry; Studds (D)	Brian J. Donnelly (D)

=== 1993 to 2013: 10 seats ===
After the 1990 census, Massachusetts lost one seat. Massachusetts kept its apportionment after the 2000 census.

Congress	District									
Congress	1st	2nd	3rd	4th	5th	6th	7th	8th	9th	10th
103rd (1993–1995)	John; Olver (D)	Richard; Neal (D)	Peter; Blute (R)	Barney; Frank (D)	Marty; Meehan (D)	Peter G. Torkildsen (R)	Ed; Markey (D)	Joseph P. Kennedy II (D)	Joe; Moakley (D)	Gerry; Studds (D)
104th (1995–1997)	John; Olver (D)	Richard; Neal (D)	Peter; Blute (R)	Barney; Frank (D)	Marty; Meehan (D)	Peter G. Torkildsen (R)	Ed; Markey (D)	Joseph P. Kennedy II (D)	Joe; Moakley (D)	Gerry; Studds (D)
105th (1997–1999)	John; Olver (D)	Richard; Neal (D)	Jim; McGovern (D)	Barney; Frank (D)	Marty; Meehan (D)	John; Tierney (D)	Ed; Markey (D)	Joseph P. Kennedy II (D)	Joe; Moakley (D)	Bill; Delahunt (D)
106th (1999–2001)	John; Olver (D)	Richard; Neal (D)	Jim; McGovern (D)	Barney; Frank (D)	Marty; Meehan (D)	John; Tierney (D)	Ed; Markey (D)	Mike; Capuano (D)	Joe; Moakley (D)	Bill; Delahunt (D)
107th (2001–2003)	John; Olver (D)	Richard; Neal (D)	Jim; McGovern (D)	Barney; Frank (D)	Marty; Meehan (D)	John; Tierney (D)	Ed; Markey (D)	Mike; Capuano (D)	Joe; Moakley (D)	Bill; Delahunt (D)
107th (2001–2003)	John; Olver (D)	Richard; Neal (D)	Jim; McGovern (D)	Barney; Frank (D)	Marty; Meehan (D)	John; Tierney (D)	Ed; Markey (D)	Mike; Capuano (D)	Stephen; Lynch (D)	Bill; Delahunt (D)
108th (2003–2005)	John; Olver (D)	Richard; Neal (D)	Jim; McGovern (D)	Barney; Frank (D)	Marty; Meehan (D)	John; Tierney (D)	Ed; Markey (D)	Mike; Capuano (D)	Stephen; Lynch (D)	Bill; Delahunt (D)
109th (2005–2007)	John; Olver (D)	Richard; Neal (D)	Jim; McGovern (D)	Barney; Frank (D)	Marty; Meehan (D)	John; Tierney (D)	Ed; Markey (D)	Mike; Capuano (D)	Stephen; Lynch (D)	Bill; Delahunt (D)
110th (2007–2009)	John; Olver (D)	Richard; Neal (D)	Jim; McGovern (D)	Barney; Frank (D)	Marty; Meehan (D)	John; Tierney (D)	Ed; Markey (D)	Mike; Capuano (D)	Stephen; Lynch (D)	Bill; Delahunt (D)
110th (2007–2009)	John; Olver (D)	Richard; Neal (D)	Jim; McGovern (D)	Barney; Frank (D)	Niki; Tsongas (D)	John; Tierney (D)	Ed; Markey (D)	Mike; Capuano (D)	Stephen; Lynch (D)	Bill; Delahunt (D)
111th (2009–2011)	John; Olver (D)	Richard; Neal (D)	Jim; McGovern (D)	Barney; Frank (D)	Niki; Tsongas (D)	John; Tierney (D)	Ed; Markey (D)	Mike; Capuano (D)	Stephen; Lynch (D)	Bill; Delahunt (D)
112th (2011–2013)	John; Olver (D)	Richard; Neal (D)	Jim; McGovern (D)	Barney; Frank (D)	Niki; Tsongas (D)	John; Tierney (D)	Ed; Markey (D)	Mike; Capuano (D)	Stephen; Lynch (D)	Bill Keating (D)

=== 2013 to present: 9 seats ===
After the 2010 census, Massachusetts lost one seat. Massachusetts kept its apportionment after the 2020 census.

Congress	District								
Congress	1st	2nd	3rd	4th	5th	6th	7th	8th	9th
113th (2013–2015)	Richard; Neal (D)	Jim; McGovern (D)	Niki; Tsongas (D)	Joe; Kennedy; III (D)	Ed Markey (D)	John Tierney (D)	Mike; Capuano (D)	Stephen; Lynch (D)	Bill; Keating (D)
113th (2013–2015)	Richard; Neal (D)	Jim; McGovern (D)	Niki; Tsongas (D)	Joe; Kennedy; III (D)	Katherine; Clark (D)	John Tierney (D)	Mike; Capuano (D)	Stephen; Lynch (D)	Bill; Keating (D)
114th (2015–2017)	Richard; Neal (D)	Jim; McGovern (D)	Niki; Tsongas (D)	Joe; Kennedy; III (D)	Katherine; Clark (D)	Seth Moulton (D)	Mike; Capuano (D)	Stephen; Lynch (D)	Bill; Keating (D)
115th (2017–2019)	Richard; Neal (D)	Jim; McGovern (D)	Niki; Tsongas (D)	Joe; Kennedy; III (D)	Katherine; Clark (D)	Seth Moulton (D)	Mike; Capuano (D)	Stephen; Lynch (D)	Bill; Keating (D)
116th (2019–2021)	Richard; Neal (D)	Jim; McGovern (D)	Lori; Trahan (D)	Joe; Kennedy; III (D)	Katherine; Clark (D)	Seth Moulton (D)	Ayanna; Pressley (D)	Stephen; Lynch (D)	Bill; Keating (D)
117th (2021–2023)	Richard; Neal (D)	Jim; McGovern (D)	Lori; Trahan (D)	Jake; Auchincloss (D)	Katherine; Clark (D)	Seth Moulton (D)	Ayanna; Pressley (D)	Stephen; Lynch (D)	Bill; Keating (D)
118th (2023–2025)	Richard; Neal (D)	Jim; McGovern (D)	Lori; Trahan (D)	Jake; Auchincloss (D)	Katherine; Clark (D)	Seth Moulton (D)	Ayanna; Pressley (D)	Stephen; Lynch (D)	Bill; Keating (D)
119th (2025–2027)	Richard; Neal (D)	Jim; McGovern (D)	Lori; Trahan (D)	Jake; Auchincloss (D)	Katherine; Clark (D)	Seth Moulton (D)	Ayanna; Pressley (D)	Stephen; Lynch (D)	Bill; Keating (D)
120th (2027–2029)	Richard; Neal (D)	Jim; McGovern (D)	Lori; Trahan (D)	Jake; Auchincloss (D)	Katherine; Clark (D)	Dan; Koh (D)	Ayanna; Pressley (D)	Stephen; Lynch (D)	Bill; Keating (D)

== Key ==
Anti-Administration (AA)
Anti-Masonic (A-M)
Democratic (D)
Democratic-Republican (DR)
Federalist (F)
Pro-Administration (PA)
Free Soil (FS)
Independent Democrat (ID)
Independent Republican (IR)
Jacksonian (J)
Know Nothing (KN)
National Republican (NR)
Republican (R)
Union (U)
Whig (W)
Independent (I)

== See also ==
- List of United States congressional districts
- Massachusetts's congressional districts
- Political party strength in Massachusetts
