= 1812 Massachusetts's 17th congressional district special election =

A special election was held in Massachusetts's 17th congressional district on April 6, 1812, to fill the vacancy left by the resignation of Barzillai Gannett (DR) who resigned sometime in 1812 without having served.

== Election returns ==
Candidate	Party	Votes	Percent
Francis Carr	Democratic-Republican	4,598	57.5%
Pitt Dillingham	Federalist	3,396	42.5%

Carr took his seat June 3, 1812

== See also ==
- List of special elections to the United States House of Representatives
