= Martin Kinsley House =

Historic house in Maine, United States

- U.S. National Register of Historic Places
- Location within Maine Location within the United States
- Location: 83 Main Rd. S, Hampden, Maine
- Coordinates: 44°44′2.6″N 68°50′28″W
- Area: 0.3 acres (0.12 ha)
- Built: 1797
- Built by: Stephen Little
- Architectural style: Colonial Revival, Federal
- NRHP reference No.: 83000469
- Added to NRHP: April 14, 1983

The Martin Kinsley House is a historic house at 83 Main Road South in the Hampden Highlands village of Hampden, Maine. Built about 1797, it is a well-preserved example of modest Federal period architecture. It is further notable as the home of Martin Kinsley, a prominent local politician who served in the United States Congress. The house, now the museum and headquarters of the Hampden Historical Society, was listed on the National Register of Historic Places in 1983.

== Description and history ==
The Kinsley House is set on the east side of Main Road, in the Hampden Highlands village south of Hampden village. It is a 2 1/2-story wood-frame structure, with a side-gable roof, two interior chimneys, and chapboard siding. The main facade is five bays wide, with a center entrance flanked by pilasters and topped by a half-round transom and gabled pediment. The eaves have Italianate double brackets. The main block is only a single room deep, and is extended to the rear by a series of 2 1/2-story ells. A porch extends along the side of the first ell. The interior has modest Federal period woodwork, including the central staircase. Each room (two downstairs and two upstairs) has a Federal period fireplace mantel, and one of the upstairs bedrooms has a pressed tin ceiling. A 19th-century carriage barn stands to the rear of the house.

Built about 1797, the house is one of the oldest in Hampden. It was built, probably by a New Hampshire carpenter, for Martin Kinsley, who moved to the area from Hardwick, Massachusetts in that year. Kinsley, a Harvard-educated lawyer, had sympathized with the rebels in the 1786 Shays' Rebellion, and apparently moved after being caught up in one of several land speculation scandals in Georgia. Kinsley represented Hampden in the state (then Massachusetts) legislature, and on its Governor's Council, and served in the United States Congress 1819–21, just prior to Maine's statehood.

Kinsley's house was the site of an incident of local lore that occurred during the 1814 Battle of Hampden, part of the War of 1812. Invading British forces supposedly sought to use the house as a headquarters, but were driven off by Mrs. Kinsley, who emptied a chamberpot on their heads.

== See also ==
- National Register of Historic Places listings in Penobscot County, Maine
