= 12th United States Congress =

1811-1813 meeting of U.S. legislature

←	11th	13th	→
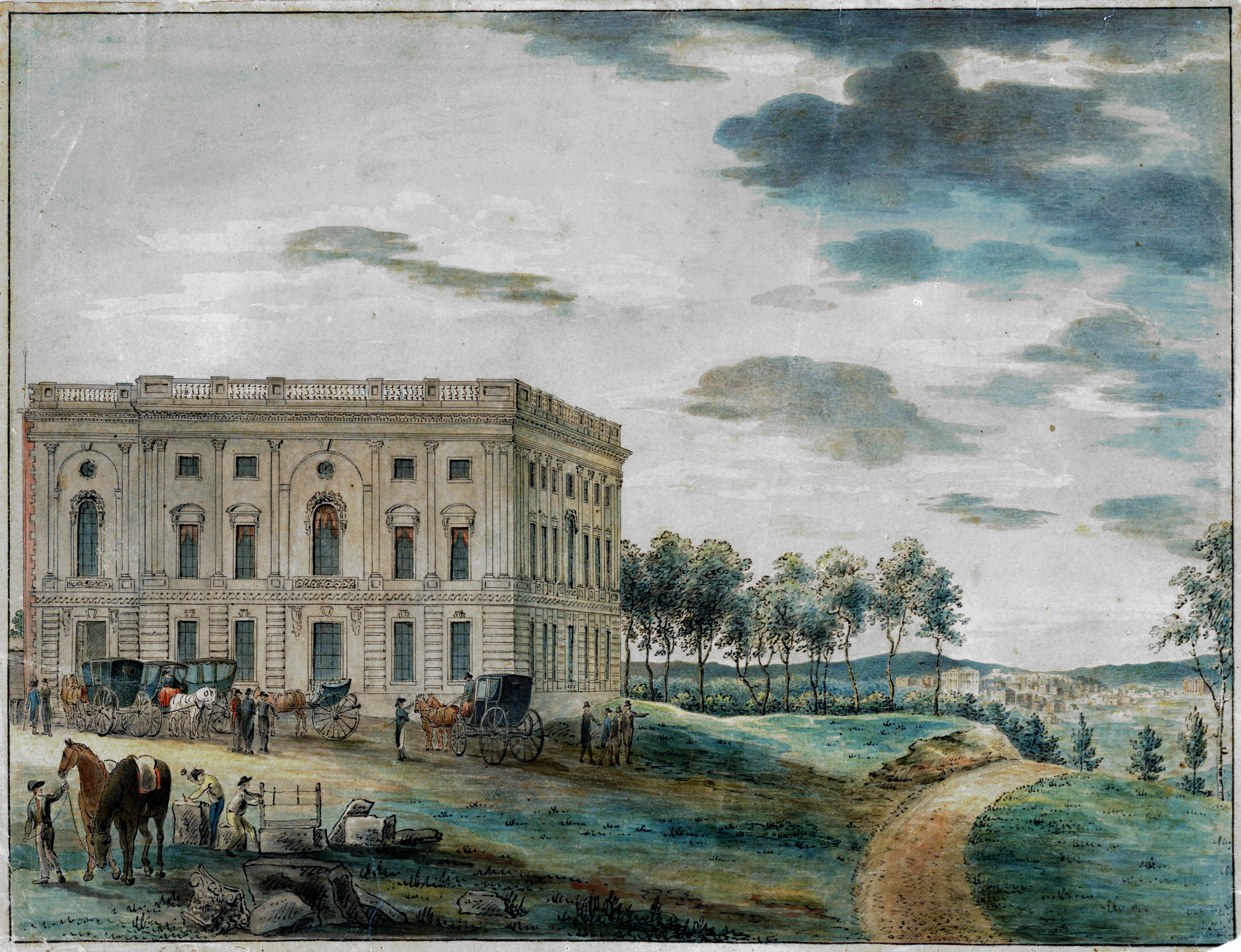
- United States Capitol (1800)

Overview
- Legislative body: United States Congress
- Jurisdiction: United States
- Term: March 4, 1811 – March 4, 1813

Senate
- Members: 36
- President: George Clinton (DR) (Note: U.S. Vice President George Clinton's term as President of the Senate ended on April 20, 1812 when he died in office, President pro tempore William H. Crawford acted his duties as the President of the Senate.) (until April 20, 1812); Vacant (from April 20, 1812)
- President pro tempore: William H. Crawford (DR)
- Party control: Democratic-Republican

House of Representatives
- Members: 143 representatives 5 non-voting delegates
- Speaker: Henry Clay (DR)
- Party control: Democratic-Republican

Sessions
- 1st: November 4, 1811 – July 6, 1812
- 2nd: November 2, 1812 – March 3, 1813

The 12th United States Congress was a meeting of the legislative branch of the United States federal government, consisting of the United States Senate and the United States House of Representatives. It met in Washington, D.C. from March 4, 1811, to March 4, 1813, during the third and fourth years of James Madison's presidency. The apportionment of seats in the House of Representatives was based on the 1800 United States census. Both chambers had a Democratic-Republican majority.

== Major events ==
- November 6, 1811: Battle of Tippecanoe: William Henry Harrison defeated Tecumseh's forces
- December 16, 1811: New Madrid earthquake
- April 4, 1812: President Madison enacted a 90-day embargo on trade with the United Kingdom
- April 20, 1812: Vice President George Clinton died
- June 18, 1812: War of 1812: United States declared war on Great Britain
- August 16, 1812: War of 1812: Detroit surrendered to the British.
- October 13, 1812: War of 1812: the Battle of Queenston Heights
- November 5, 1812: Elections of 1812:
  - 1812 United States presidential election: Incumbent James Madison beat DeWitt Clinton.
  - United States Senate elections, 1812 and 1813
  - United States House of Representatives elections, 1812 and 1813

== Major legislation ==
- The Embargo Act of 1812

== States admitted and territories organized ==
- April 30, 1812: Louisiana was admitted as a state into the Union. It was formerly known as the Territory of Orleans
- June 4, 1812: Missouri Territory was organized. It was formerly known as Louisiana Territory

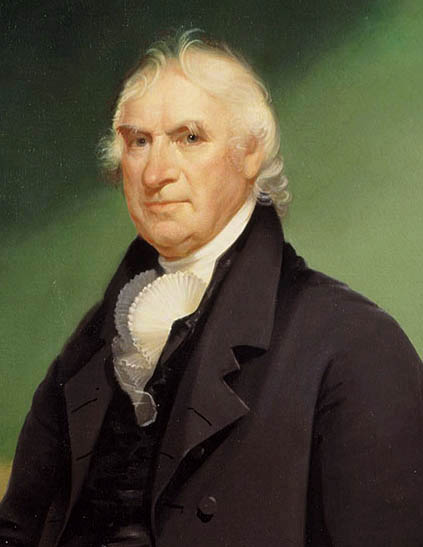
Senate President George Clinton

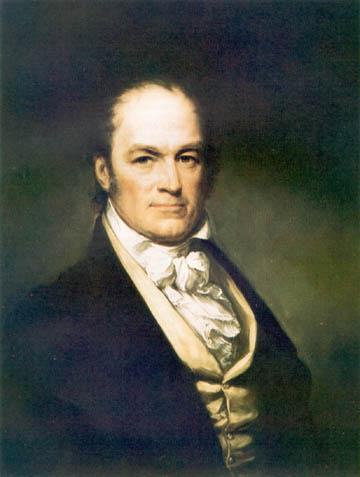
Senate President pro tempore William H. Crawford

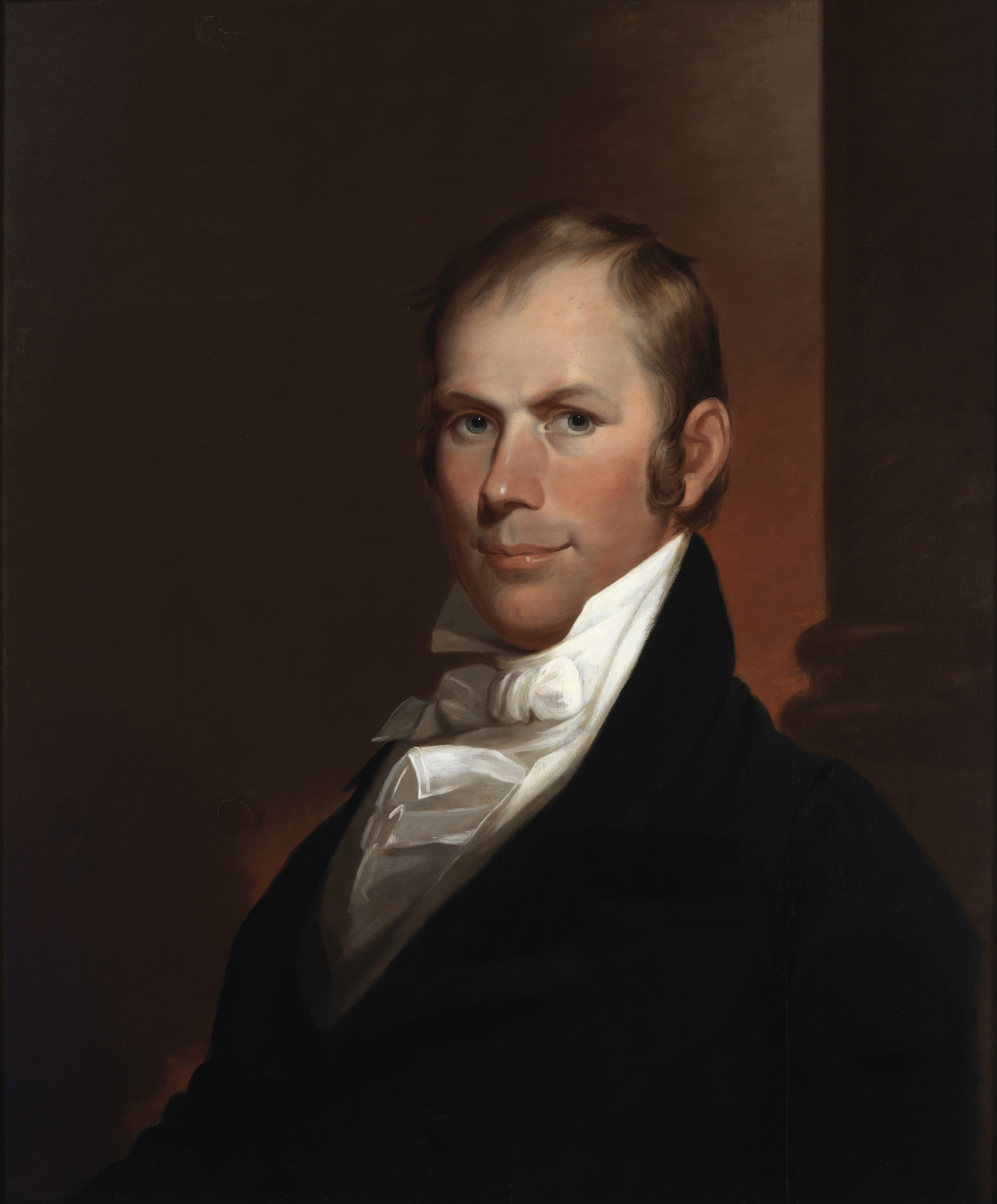
House Speaker Henry Clay

== Party summary ==
The count below identifies party affiliations at the beginning of the first session of this congress. Changes resulting from subsequent replacements are shown below in the "Changes in membership" section.

=== Senate ===
During this congress, two new Senate seats were added for the new state of Louisiana.

	Party (shading shows control)		Total	Vacant
	Democratic- Republican (DR)	Federalist (F)	Total	Vacant
End of previous congress	26	8	34	0
Begin	26	7	33	1
End	29	7	36	0
Final voting share	80.6%	19.4%		
Beginning of next congress	27	6	33	3

=== House of Representatives ===
During this congress, one new House seat was added for the new state of Louisiana.

	Party (shading shows control)		Total	Vacant
	Democratic- Republican (DR)	Federalist (F)	Total	Vacant
End of previous congress	95	46	141	1
Begin	106	36	142	0
End	106	36	142	1
Final voting share	74.6%	25.4%		
Beginning of next congress	108	68	176	6

== Leadership ==
=== Senate ===
- President: George Clinton (DR), until April 20, 1812; vacant thereafter.
- President pro tempore: William H. Crawford (DR)

=== House of Representatives ===
Speaker of the United States House of Representatives Henry Clay Democratic-Republican

== Members ==
This list is arranged by chamber, then by state. Senators are listed by class, and representatives are listed by district.

=== Senate ===
Senators were elected by the state legislatures every two years, with one-third beginning new six-year terms with each Congress. Preceding the names in the list below are Senate class numbers, which indicate the cycle of their election. In this Congress, Class 1 meant their term began in the last Congress, requiring re-election in 1814; Class 2 meant their term began with this Congress, requiring re-election in 1816; and Class 3 meant their term ended with this Congress, requiring re-election in 1812

Skip to House of Representatives, below

==== Connecticut ====
▌1. Samuel W. Dana (F)
▌3. Chauncey Goodrich (F)

==== Delaware ====
▌1. Outerbridge Horsey (F)
▌2. James A. Bayard (F)

==== Georgia ====
▌2. William H. Crawford (DR)
▌3. Charles Tait (DR)

==== Kentucky ====
▌2. George M. Bibb (DR)
▌3. John Pope (DR)

==== Louisiana ====
▌2. Jean N. Destréhan (DR), September 3, 1812 – October 1, 1812

▌Thomas Posey (DR), October 8, 1812 – February 4, 1813
▌James Brown (DR), from February 5, 1813

▌3. Allan B. Magruder (DR), from September 3, 1812

==== Maryland ====
▌1. Samuel Smith (DR)
▌3. Philip Reed (DR)

==== Massachusetts ====
▌1. James Lloyd (F)
▌2. Joseph Bradley Varnum (DR), from June 29, 1811

==== New Hampshire ====
▌2. Nicholas Gilman (DR)
▌3. Charles Cutts (F)

==== New Jersey ====
▌1. John Lambert (DR)
▌2. John Condit (DR)

==== New York ====
▌1. Obadiah German (DR)
▌3. John Smith (DR)

==== North Carolina ====
▌2. James Turner (DR)
▌3. Jesse Franklin (DR)

==== Ohio ====
▌1. Thomas Worthington (DR)
▌3. Alexander Campbell (DR)

==== Pennsylvania ====
▌1. Michael Leib (DR)
▌3. Andrew Gregg (DR)

==== Rhode Island ====
▌1. Christopher G. Champlin (F), until October 2, 1811

▌William Hunter (F), from October 28, 1811

▌2. Jeremiah B. Howell (DR)

==== South Carolina ====
▌2. John Taylor (DR)
▌3. John Gaillard (DR)

==== Tennessee ====
▌1. Joseph Anderson (DR)
▌2. Jenkin Whiteside (DR), until October 8, 1811

▌George W. Campbell (DR), from October 8, 1811

==== Vermont ====
▌1. Jonathan Robinson (DR)
▌3. Stephen R. Bradley (DR)

==== Virginia ====
▌1. Richard Brent (DR)
▌2. William B. Giles (DR)

Senators' party membership by state at the opening of the 12th Congress in March 1811. Louisiana's senators were not seated until September 3, 1812, and one of them was of unknown party affiliation. 2 Democratic-Republicans 1 Democratic-Republican and 1 Federalist 2 Federalists

=== House of Representatives ===
The names of representatives are preceded by their district numbers.

==== Connecticut ====
All representatives were elected statewide on a general ticket.

▌At-large. Epaphroditus Champion (F)
▌At-large. John Davenport (F)
▌At-large. Lyman Law (F)
▌At-large. Jonathan O. Moseley (F)
▌At-large. Timothy Pitkin (F)
▌At-large. Lewis B. Sturges (F)
▌At-large. Benjamin Tallmadge (F)

==== Delaware ====
▌At-large. Henry M. Ridgely (F)

==== Georgia ====
All representatives were elected statewide on a general ticket.

▌At-large. William W. Bibb (DR)
▌At-large. Howell Cobb (DR), until before October, 1812

▌William Barnett (DR), from October 5, 1812

▌At-large. Bolling Hall (DR)
▌At-large. George M. Troup (DR)

==== Kentucky ====
▌1. Anthony New (DR)
▌2. Samuel McKee (DR)
▌3. Stephen Ormsby (DR)
▌4. Richard M. Johnson (DR)
▌5. Henry Clay (DR)
▌6. Joseph Desha (DR)

==== Louisiana ====
▌At-large. Thomas B. Robertson (DR), from April 30, 1812 (newly admitted state)

==== Maryland ====
The 5th district was a plural district with two representatives.

▌1. Philip Stuart (F)
▌2. Joseph Kent (DR)
▌3. Philip B. Key (F)
▌4. Samuel Ringgold (DR)
▌5. Peter Little (DR)
▌5. Alexander McKim (DR)
▌6. John Montgomery (DR), until April 29, 1811

▌Stevenson Archer (DR), from October 26, 1811

▌7. Robert Wright (DR)
▌8. Charles Goldsborough (F)

==== Massachusetts ====
▌1. Josiah Quincy (F)
▌2. William Reed (F)
▌3. Leonard White (F)
▌4. Joseph Bradley Varnum (DR), until June 29, 1811

▌William M. Richardson (DR), from November 4, 1811

▌5. William Ely (F)
▌6. Samuel Taggart (F)
▌7. Charles Turner Jr. (DR)
▌8. Isaiah L. Green (DR)
▌9. Laban Wheaton (F)
▌10. Elijah Brigham (F)
▌11. Abijah Bigelow (F)
▌12. Ezekiel Bacon (DR)
▌13. Ebenezer Seaver (DR)
▌14. Richard Cutts (DR)
▌15. William Widgery (DR)
▌16. Peleg Tallman (DR)
▌17. Barzillai Gannett (DR), until sometime in 1812 before April 6 ([data missing])

▌Francis Carr (DR), from April 6, 1812

==== New Hampshire ====
All representatives were elected statewide on a general ticket.

▌At-large. Josiah Bartlett Jr. (DR)
▌At-large. Samuel Dinsmoor (DR)
▌At-large. Obed Hall (DR)
▌At-large. John A. Harper (DR)
▌At-large. George Sullivan (F)

==== New Jersey ====
All representatives were elected statewide on a general ticket.

▌At-large. Adam Boyd (DR)
▌At-large. Lewis Condict (DR)
▌At-large. Jacob Hufty (DR)
▌At-large. George C. Maxwell (DR)
▌At-large. James Morgan (DR)
▌At-large. Thomas Newbold (DR)

==== New York ====
There were two plural districts, the 2nd & 6th each had two representatives.

▌1. Ebenezer Sage (DR)
▌2. Samuel L. Mitchill (DR)
▌2. William Paulding Jr. (DR)
▌3. Pierre Van Cortlandt Jr. (DR)
▌4. James Emott (F)
▌5. Thomas B. Cooke (DR)
▌6. Asa Fitch (F)
▌6. Robert Le Roy Livingston (F), until May 6, 1812

▌Thomas P. Grosvenor (F) from January 29, 1813

▌7. Harmanus Bleecker (F)
▌8. Benjamin Pond (DR)
▌9. Thomas Sammons (DR)
▌10. Silas Stow (DR)
▌11. Thomas R. Gold (F)
▌12. Arunah Metcalf (DR)
▌13. Uri Tracy (DR)
▌14. Daniel Avery (DR)
▌15. Peter B. Porter (DR)

==== North Carolina ====
▌1. Lemuel Sawyer (DR)
▌2. Willis Alston (DR)
▌3. Thomas Blount (DR), until February 7, 1812

▌William Kennedy (DR), from January 30, 1813

▌4. William Blackledge (DR)
▌5. William R. King (DR)
▌6. Nathaniel Macon (DR)
▌7. Archibald McBryde (F)
▌8. Richard Stanford (DR)
▌9. James Cochran (DR)
▌10. Joseph Pearson (F)
▌11. Israel Pickens (DR)
▌12. Meshack Franklin (DR)

==== Ohio ====
▌At-large. Jeremiah Morrow (DR)

==== Pennsylvania ====
There were four plural districts, the 1st, 2nd, & 3rd had three representatives each, the 4th had two representatives.

▌1. William Anderson (DR)
▌1. James Milnor (F)
▌1. Adam Seybert (DR)
▌2. Robert Brown (DR)
▌2. Jonathan Roberts (DR)
▌2. William Rodman (DR)
▌3. Roger Davis (DR)
▌3. John M. Hyneman (DR)
▌3. Joseph Lefever (DR)
▌4. David Bard (DR)
▌4. Robert Whitehill (DR)
▌5. George Smith (DR)
▌6. William Crawford (DR)
▌7. William Piper (DR)
▌8. William Findley (DR)
▌9. John Smilie (DR), until December 30, 1812, vacant thereafter
▌10. Aaron Lyle (DR)
▌11. Abner Lacock (DR)

==== Rhode Island ====
Both representatives were elected statewide on a general ticket.

▌At-large. Richard Jackson Jr. (F)
▌At-large. Elisha R. Potter (F)

==== South Carolina ====
▌1. Langdon Cheves (DR)
▌2. William Butler Sr. (DR)
▌3. David R. Williams (DR)
▌4. William Lowndes (DR)
▌5. Richard Winn (DR)
▌6. John C. Calhoun (DR)
▌7. Thomas Moore (DR)
▌8. Elias Earle (DR)

==== Tennessee ====
▌1. John Rhea (DR)
▌2. John Sevier (DR)
▌3. Felix Grundy (DR)

==== Vermont ====
▌1. Samuel Shaw (DR)
▌2. William Strong (DR)
▌3. James Fisk (DR)
▌4. Martin Chittenden (F)

==== Virginia ====
▌1. Thomas Wilson (F)
▌2. John Baker (F)
▌3. John Smith (DR)
▌4. William McCoy (DR)
▌5. James Breckinridge (F)
▌6. Daniel Sheffey (F)
▌7. Joseph Lewis Jr. (F)
▌8. John P. Hungerford (DR), until November 29, 1811

▌John Taliaferro (DR), from November 29, 1811

▌9. Aylett Hawes (DR)
▌10. John Dawson (DR)
▌11. John Roane (DR)
▌12. Burwell Bassett (DR)
▌13. William A. Burwell (DR)
▌14. Matthew Clay (DR)
▌15. John Randolph (DR)
▌16. James Pleasants (DR)
▌17. Thomas Gholson Jr. (DR)
▌18. Peterson Goodwyn (DR)
▌19. Edwin Gray (DR)
▌20. Thomas Newton Jr. (DR)
▌21. Hugh Nelson (DR)
▌22. John Clopton (DR)

==== Non-voting members ====
Illinois Territory. Shadrach Bond, from December 3, 1812
Indiana Territory. Jonathan Jennings
Mississippi Territory. George Poindexter
Missouri Territory. Edward Hempstead, from November 9, 1812
Orleans Territory, vacant until April 29, 1812

== Changes in membership ==
The count below reflects changes from the beginning of the first session of this Congress.

=== Senate ===
- Replacements: 1
  - Democratic-Republicans: no net change
  - Federalists: no net change
- Deaths: 0
- Resignations: 4
- Interim appointments: 1
- Seats of newly admitted states: 2
- Vacancies:1
- Total seats with changes: 6

Senate changes
State (class)	Vacated by	Reason for change	Successor	Date of successor's formal installation (Note: When seated or oath administered, not necessarily when service began.)
Massachusetts (2)	Vacant	Legislature elected late. Successor elected June 29, 1811.	Joseph B. Varnum (DR)	June 29, 1811
Rhode Island (1)	Christopher G. Champlin (F)	Resigned October 2, 1811; Successor elected October 28, 1811.	William Hunter (F)	October 28, 1811
Tennessee (2)	Jenkin Whiteside (DR)	Resigned October 8, 1811. Successor elected October 8, 1811.	George W. Campbell (DR)	October 8, 1811
Louisiana (3)	New seat	Louisiana was admitted to the Union on April 30, 1812. Inaugural Senator elected September 3, 1812, for the term ending March 4, 1813.	Allan B. Magruder (DR)	September 3, 1812
Louisiana (2)	New seat	Louisiana was admitted to the Union on April 30, 1812. Inaugural Senator elected September 3, 1812, for the term ending March 4, 1817.	Jean Noel Destréhan (DR)	September 3, 1812
Louisiana (2)	Jean N. Destréhan (DR)	Resigned October 1, 1812, without having qualified. Successor appointed October 8, 1812, to continue the term ending March 4, 1817.	Thomas Posey (DR)	October 8, 1812
Louisiana (2)	Thomas Posey (DR)	Appointee lost election to finish the term. Successor elected February 4, 1813.	James Brown (DR)	February 5, 1813

=== House of Representatives ===
- Replacements: 3
  - Democratic-Republicans: no net change
  - Federalists: no net change
- Deaths: 2
- Resignations: 5
- Contested election: 1
- Seats of newly admitted states: 1
- Vacancies: 1
- Total seats with changes: 10

House changes
District	Vacated by	Reason for change	Successor	Date of successor's formal installation
Maryland; 6th	John Montgomery (DR)	Resigned April 29, 1811, to become attorney General of Maryland	Stevenson Archer (DR)	Seated October 26, 1811
Massachusetts; 4th	Joseph B. Varnum (DR)	Resigned June 29, 1811, to become U.S. Senator	William M. Richardson (DR)	Seated November 4, 1811
Virginia; 8th	John Hungerford (DR)	Lost contested election November 29, 1811	John Taliaferro (DR)	Seated November 29, 1811
Massachusetts; 17th	Barzillai Gannett (DR)	Resigned sometime in 1812 before April 6 ([data missing])	Francis Carr (DR)	Seated April 6, 1812
North Carolina; 3rd	Thomas Blount (DR)	Died February 7, 1812	William Kennedy (DR)	Seated January 30, 1813
Orleans Territory	Julien de Lallande Poydras had resigned in the previous Congress, and the seat remained vacant until the territory became the state of Louisiana on April 30, 1812		Thomas B. Robertson (DR)	Seated April 30, 1812
Louisiana at-large	Julien de Lallande Poydras had resigned in the previous Congress, and the seat remained vacant until the territory became the state of Louisiana on April 30, 1812		Thomas B. Robertson (DR)	Seated April 30, 1812
New York; 6th	Robert Le Roy Livingston (F)	Resigned May 6, 1812	Thomas P. Grosvenor (F)	Seated January 29, 1813
Georgia at-large	Howell Cobb (DR)	Resigned sometime before October 1812 ([data missing])	William Barnett (DR)	Seated October 5, 1812
Missouri Territory	Territory delegate seat established		Edward Hempstead	Seated November 9, 1812
Illinois Territory	Territory delegate seat established		Shadrach Bond	Seated December 3, 1812
Pennsylvania; 9th	John Smilie (DR)	Died December 30, 1812	Vacant	Not filled until next Congress

== Committees ==
Lists of committees and their party leaders.

=== Senate ===
- Audit and Control the Contingent Expenses of the Senate (Chairman: Michael Leib)
- Engrossed Bills (Chairman: Nicholas Gilman)
- National University
- Whole

=== House of Representatives ===
- Accounts (Chairman: Charles Turner Jr.)
- Apportionment of Representatives (Select)
- Bankruptcy (Select)
- Claims (Chairman: Burwell Bassett then Thomas Gholson Jr.)
- Commerce and Manufactures (Chairman: Thomas Newton Jr.)
- District of Columbia (Chairman: Joseph Lewis Jr.)
- Elections (Chairman: William Findley)
- Post Office and Post Roads (Chairman: John Rhea)
- Public Lands (Chairman: Jeremiah Morrow)
- Revisal and Unfinished Business (Chairman: Adam Seybert then Burwell Bassett)
- Rules (Select)
- Standards of Official Conduct
- Ways and Means (Chairman: Ezekiel Bacon then Langdon Cheves)
- Whole

=== Joint committees ===
- Enrolled Bills (Chairman: [data missing])
- The Library (Chairman: N/A)

== Employees ==
=== Legislative branch agency directors ===
- Architect of the Capitol: Benjamin Latrobe, until July 1, 1811; vacant thereafter
- Librarian of Congress: Patrick Magruder

=== Senate ===
- Chaplain: Walter D. Addison (Presbyterian), until November 13, 1811
  - John Brackenridge (Presbyterian), from November 13, 1811
- Secretary: Samuel A. Otis
- Sergeant at Arms: James Mathers, died
  - Mountjoy Bayly, elected November 6, 1811

=== House of Representatives ===
- Chaplain: Jesse Lee (Methodist), until November 13, 1811
  - Nicholas Snethen (Methodist), elected November 13, 1811
  - Jesse Lee (Methodist), elected November 2, 1812
- Clerk: Patrick Magruder
- Doorkeeper: Thomas Claxton
- Sergeant at Arms: Thomas Dunn

== See also ==
- 1810 United States elections (elections leading to this Congress)
  - 1810–11 United States Senate elections
  - 1810–11 United States House of Representatives elections
- United States elections, 1812 (elections during this Congress, leading to the next Congress)
  - 1812 United States presidential election
  - 1812–13 United States Senate elections
  - 1812–13 United States House of Representatives elections
