= Nathaniel Freeman Jr. =

American politician (1766–1800)

Member of the U.S. House of Representatives from Massachusetts's 5th district
- In office March 4, 1795 – March 3, 1799
- Preceded by: District reissued in 1795
- Succeeded by: Lemuel Williams

Personal details
- Born: May 1, 1766 Sandwich, Province of Massachusetts Bay, British America
- Died: August 22, 1800 (aged 34) Sandwich, Massachusetts, U.S.
- Party: Federalist; Democratic-Republican
- Relations: Jonathan Freeman (uncle)
- Education: Harvard University
- Occupation: Lawyer

Nathaniel Freeman Jr. (May 1, 1766 – August 22, 1800) was a United States representative from Massachusetts. Born in Sandwich in the Province of Massachusetts Bay, he attended the common schools, graduated from Harvard University in 1787, and studied law. He was admitted to the bar about 1791 and commenced practice in Sandwich and the Cape Cod district. He served as brigade major in the Massachusetts militia for sixteen years, and was a justice of the peace in 1793.

Freeman was elected as a Federalist to the Fourth Congress and elected as a Democratic-Republican to the Fifth Congress, serving from March 4, 1795 to March 3, 1799. He died in Sandwich; interment was in the Old Burial Ground.

Nathaniel Freeman's uncle Jonathan Freeman was a U.S. representative from New Hampshire.

U.S. House of Representatives
Preceded by Shearjashub Bourne	Member of the U.S. House of Representatives from Massachusetts's 5th congressional district March 4, 1795 – March 3, 1799	Succeeded by Lemuel Williams
