= Lemuel Williams =

American politician (1747–1828)

Member of the U.S. House of Representatives from Massachusetts
- In office March 4, 1799 – March 3, 1805
- Preceded by: Nathaniel Freeman Jr.
- Succeeded by: Isaiah L. Green
- Constituency: 5th district (1799–1803); 8th district (1803–05)

Member of the Massachusetts House of Representatives
- In office 1806

Personal details
- Born: June 18, 1747 Taunton, Province of Massachusetts Bay, British America
- Died: November 8, 1828 (aged 81) Acushnet, Massachusetts, U.S.
- Party: Federalist
- Children: Lemuel Williams Jr.
- Education: Harvard

Lemuel Williams (June 18, 1747 – November 8, 1828) was a United States representative from Massachusetts. Born in Taunton in the Province of Massachusetts Bay, he graduated from Harvard College in 1765, studied law, was admitted to the bar and practiced in Bristol and Worcester Counties. He was town clerk of New Bedford from 1792 to 1800.

Williams was elected as a Federalist to the Sixth, Seventh, and Eighth Congresses, serving from March 4, 1799 to March 3, 1805, and was a member of the Massachusetts House of Representatives in 1806. He resumed the practice of law and died in Acushnet, Massachusetts; interment was in Acushnet Cemetery.

U.S. House of Representatives
Preceded by Nathaniel Freeman, Jr.	Member of the U.S. House of Representatives from Massachusetts's 5th congressional district March 4, 1799 – March 3, 1803	Succeeded by Thomas Dwight
Preceded by William Eustis	Member of the U.S. House of Representatives from Massachusetts's 8th congressional district March 4, 1803 – March 3, 1805	Succeeded by Isaiah L. Green
