= Massachusetts's 17th congressional district =

Obsolete district in Massachusetts, US

- Obsolete district
- Created: 1803
- Eliminated: 1820
- Years active: 1803–1821

Massachusetts's current districts, since 2013

Massachusetts's 17th congressional district is an obsolete district. During its short tenure of 1803–1821 it was located in the District of Maine, prior to Maine achieving statehood.

== List of members representing the district ==
Representative	Party	Years	Cong ress	Electoral history	District location
District created March 4, 1803
Phineas Bruce (Machias)	Federalist	March 4, 1803 – ?	8th	Elected in 1802, but prevented by illness from qualifying.	1803 – 1813 "Kennebec district," District of Maine
Vacant		? – March 3, 1805	8th		1803 – 1813 "Kennebec district," District of Maine
John Chandler (Monmouth)	Democratic- Republican	March 4, 1805 – March 3, 1809	9th 10th	Elected in 1804. Re-elected in 1806. Retired.	1803 – 1813 "Kennebec district," District of Maine
Barzillai Gannett (Gradiner)	Democratic- Republican	March 4, 1809 – 1812	11th 12th	Elected in 1808. Re-elected in 1810. Resigned.	1803 – 1813 "Kennebec district," District of Maine
Vacant		1812 – April 6, 1812	12th		1803 – 1813 "Kennebec district," District of Maine
Francis Carr (Orrington)	Democratic- Republican	April 6, 1812 – March 3, 1813	12th	Elected to finish Gannett's term. Lost re-election.	1803 – 1813 "Kennebec district," District of Maine
Abiel Wood (Wiscasset)	Democratic- Republican	March 4, 1813 – March 3, 1815	13th	Elected in 1812. Redistricted to the 16th district and lost re-election.	1813 – 1821 "4th Eastern district," District of Maine
James Carr (Bangor)	Federalist	March 4, 1815 – March 3, 1817	14th	Elected in 1815 on the second ballot. Retired.	1813 – 1821 "4th Eastern district," District of Maine
John Wilson (Belfast)	Federalist	March 4, 1817 – March 3, 1819	15th	Elected in 1816. Lost re-election.	1813 – 1821 "4th Eastern district," District of Maine
Martin Kinsley (Hampden)	Democratic- Republican	March 4, 1819 – March 3, 1821	16th	Elected in 1819 on the third ballot. Redistricted to Maine's 4th district and lost re-election.	1813 – 1821 "4th Eastern district," District of Maine
District moved to Maine March 3, 1821
