= John Wilson (Massachusetts politician) =

American politician (1777–1848)

Member of the U.S. House of Representatives from Massachusetts
- In office March 4, 1813 – March 3, 1815
- Preceded by: new seat
- Succeeded by: Thomas Rice
- Constituency: 18th district
- In office March 4, 1817 – March 3, 1819
- Preceded by: James Carr
- Succeeded by: Martin Kinsley
- Constituency: 17th district

Personal details
- Born: January 10, 1777 Peterborough, New Hampshire
- Died: August 4, 1848 (aged 71) Belfast, Maine
- Resting place: Grove Cemetery
- Party: Federalist
- Education: Harvard University
- Profession: Attorney

John Wilson (January 10, 1777 – August 9, 1848) was a U.S. representative from Massachusetts.

Born in Peterborough, New Hampshire, Wilson graduated from Harvard University in 1799. He studied law. He was admitted to the bar in 1802 at Peterborough, New Hampshire, and commenced practice in Belfast in Massachusetts' District of Maine. He served as a captain in the State militia.

Wilson was elected as a Federalist to the Thirteenth Congress (March 4, 1813 – March 3, 1815). He was an unsuccessful candidate for reelection in 1814 to the Fourteenth Congress. He resumed the practice of his profession in Belfast. He was elected to the Fifteenth Congress (March 4, 1817 – March 3, 1819). He was an unsuccessful candidate for renomination in 1818. He engaged in the practice of law until his death in Belfast, Maine, August 9, 1848. He was interred in Grove Cemetery.

== Sources ==
- United States Congress. "John Wilson (id: W000598)". Biographical Directory of the United States Congress.

U.S. House of Representatives
Preceded by New District	Member of the U.S. House of Representatives from Massachusetts's 18th congressional district (Maine district); March 4, 1813 – March 3, 1815	Succeeded by Thomas Rice
Preceded by James Carr	Member of the U.S. House of Representatives from Massachusetts's 17th congressional district (Maine district); March 4, 1817 – March 3, 1819	Succeeded by Martin Kinsley
