= Abiel Wood =

American politician (1772–1834)

Member of the U.S. House of Representatives from Massachusetts's 17th district
- In office March 4, 1813 – March 3, 1815
- Preceded by: Francis Carr
- Succeeded by: James Carr

Member of the Massachusetts House of Representatives
- In office 1807-1811; 1816

Personal details
- Born: July 22, 1772 Pownalborough, Massachusetts Bay, British America (now Wiscasset, Maine)
- Died: October 26, 1834 (aged 62) Belfast, Maine, U.S.
- Resting place: Woodlawn Cemetery, Wiscasset, Maine
- Party: Democratic-Republican
- Spouse(s): Hannah Hodge, died May 14, 1814, Jane Anderson, died March 15, 1827, Lydia Theobald
- Relations: Gen. Abiel Wood
- Children: Betsey, b. October 1794; Willmot, b. February 2, 1796; Helen, b. July 13, 1799; Isabella, b. 1802; Abiel, b. February 22, 1807; Hannah; Margaret.

Abiel Wood (July 22, 1772 – October 26, 1834) was a U.S. representative from Massachusetts.

== Early life ==
Born in Pownalborough in Massachusetts Bay's Province of Maine (now known as Wiscasset), he was the son of Gen. Abiel Wood (1743–1811) and Betsey Tinkham, both originally of Middleborough. He was the second of eleven children.

== Education and career ==
Wood attended the common schools, then engaged in mercantile pursuits. He served as member of the Massachusetts House of Representatives 1807–1811, and again in 1816.

Wood was elected as a Democratic-Republican to the Thirteenth Congress (March 4, 1813 – March 3, 1815). He was an unsuccessful candidate for reelection in 1814 to the Fourteenth Congress, but served as delegate to the constitutional convention of Maine in 1819. He was a Maine State councilor, after which he resumed mercantile pursuits and also engaged in shipping. He served as Bank commissioner for Maine until his death in Belfast on October 26, 1834. He was interred in Woodlawn Cemetery in Wiscasset.

== Personal life ==
He married Hannah Hodge on November 30, 1793, in Wiscasset. They had one child, a daughter named Helen, who married John Hannibal Sheppard.

U.S. House of Representatives
Preceded by Francis Carr	Member of the U.S. House of Representatives from Massachusetts's 17th congressional district (Maine district); March 4, 1813 – March 4, 1815	Succeeded by James Carr
