= William M. Richardson =

American judge

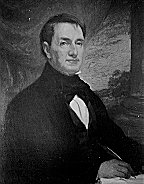

Member of the U.S. House of Representatives from Massachusetts's 4th district
- In office November 4, 1811 – April 18, 1814
- Preceded by: Joseph Bradley Varnum
- Succeeded by: Samuel Dana

Personal details
- Born: William Merchant Richardson; January 4, 1774 Pelham, Province of New Hampshire, British America
- Died: March 15, 1838 (aged 64) Chester, New Hampshire, U.S.
- Party: Democratic-Republican
- Education: Harvard University
- Occupation: Lawyer

William Merchant Richardson (January 4, 1774 – March 15, 1838) was a member of the U.S. House of Representatives from Massachusetts and chief justice of the New Hampshire Supreme Court.

== Biography ==
He was born in Pelham in the Province of New Hampshire in 1774. He graduated from Harvard University in 1797; studied law; was admitted to the bar and commenced practice in Groton, Massachusetts, in 1804. He was elected as a Democratic-Republican to the Twelfth Congress to fill the vacancy caused by the resignation of Joseph B. Varnum; and was reelected to the Thirteenth Congress and served from November 4, 1811, to April 18, 1814, when he resigned.

Richardson moved to Portsmouth, New Hampshire, in 1814. He became a United States Attorney in 1814; and in 1816 was appointed chief justice of New Hampshire and served as chief justice until his death in 1838 in Chester, New Hampshire, where he is buried in the Old Cemetery. Dartmouth College gave him the degree of LL.D. He was elected a member of the American Antiquarian Society in 1819.

== Publications ==
He is the author of The New-Hampshire Justice of the Peace (Concord, 1824) and The Town Officer (1824) and was co-reporter of the New Hampshire Superior Court Cases, of which the reports of several volumes are his alone (11 vols., 1819–'44). He is the subject of a Life (Concord, 1839).

== Family ==
He was the father of Anne, grandfather of sculptor Daniel Chester French, and uncle of William Adams Richardson who was United States Secretary of the Treasury from 1873 to 1874.

== Notes ==
U.S. House of Representatives
Preceded by Joseph B. Varnum	Member of the U.S. House of Representatives from Massachusetts's 4th congressional district 1811–1814	Succeeded by Samuel Dana
