= Thomas Dwight (politician) =

American politician

Member of the U.S. House of Representatives from Massachusetts's 5th district
- In office March 4, 1803 – March 3, 1805
- Preceded by: Lemuel Williams
- Succeeded by: William Ely

Member of the Massachusetts Senate
- In office 1814–1818

Member of the Massachusetts Senate
- In office 1796–1803

Member of the Massachusetts House of Representatives
- In office 1794–1796

Member of the Massachusetts Governor’s council

Member of the Board of Selectmen of the Town of Springfield, Massachusetts

Personal details
- Born: October 29, 1758 Springfield, Province of Massachusetts Bay, British America
- Died: January 2, 1819 (aged 60) Springfield, Massachusetts, U.S.
- Resting place: Peabody Cemetery
- Party: Federalist
- Spouse: Hannah Worthington. m. April 14, 1791
- Education: Harvard College in 1778
- Profession: Lawyer

Thomas Dwight (October 29, 1758 – January 2, 1819) was a United States representative from Massachusetts.

== Life ==
Thomas Dwight was born in Springfield in the Province of Massachusetts Bay on October 29, 1758.

== Early life ==
Dwight's father was Colonel Josiah Dwight (1715–1768) of the New England Dwight family, and mother was Elizabeth Buckminster (1731–1798). He was the oldest of five siblings.

== Education ==
Dwight pursued preparatory studies, and graduated from Harvard College in 1778. Dwight studied law, was admitted to the bar and commenced practice in Springfield.

== Family life ==
On April 14, 1791, Dwight married Hannah Worthington. She was born June 17, 1761, with maternal grandfather Reverend Samuel Hopkins (1721–1803). Dwight was elected to the Massachusetts House of Representatives 1794–1795, and to the Massachusetts Senate for two terms, from 1796 to 1803 and 1814 to 1818.

Dwight was elected as a Federalist to the Eighth Congress from March 4, 1803, to March 3, 1805. Dwight served as selectman of the town of Springfield, and was a member of the Governor's council. He retired from political life and engaged in the practice of his profession in Springfield until his death on January 2, 1819. His interment was in Peabody Cemetery.

His widow died July 10, 1833. Their children were:

1. Mary Stoddard Dwight was born January 26, 1792, married John Howard on December 18, 1818, and died July 20, 1836. They had four daughters.
2. John Worthington Dwight was born October 31, 1793, and died February 12, 1836, unmarried.
3. Elizabeth Buckminster Dwight was born February 18, 1801, married Charles Howard, and died October 7, 1855. They had six children.

U.S. House of Representatives
| Preceded by Lemuel Williams | Member of the U.S. House of Representatives from Massachusetts's 5th congressional district March 4, 1803 – March 3, 1805 | Succeeded by William Ely |
