= James Carr (Massachusetts politician) =

American politician

Member of the U.S. House of Representatives from Massachusetts's 17th district
- In office March 4, 1815 – March 3, 1817
- Preceded by: Abiel Wood
- Succeeded by: John Wilson

Member of the Massachusetts House of Representatives for the District of Maine
- In office 1806–1811

Personal details
- Born: September 9, 1777 Haverhill, Massachusetts
- Died: August 24, 1818 (aged 40) Louisville, Kentucky
- Party: Federalist
- Spouse: Betsey Stelle Jarvis
- Relations: U.S. Congressman Francis Carr
- Children: Mary, d. August 24, 1818
- Education: Phillips Exeter Academy; Byfield Academy

James Carr (September 9, 1777 – August 24, 1818), son of U.S. Congressman Francis Carr, was a member of the United States House of Representatives from Maine, then a District of Massachusetts.

Carr was born in Haverhill, Massachusetts, on September 9, 1777. He attended Phillips Exeter and Byfield Academies, and then went to sea as clerk on the U.S.S. Crescent. He served two years as secretary to the United States Consul at Algiers. He then joined his parents (who had migrated to Bangor, Maine), engaging in mercantile pursuits and serving as a member of the Massachusetts House of Representatives (1806–1811) for the District of Maine.

Carr was elected as a Federalist to the Fourteenth United States Congress (1815–1817), the second person from Bangor to occupy that office (following his father).

Carr was drowned in the Ohio River on August 24, 1818. While traveling with his family on a steamboat, his 9-year-old daughter Mary fell overboard just below Louisville, Kentucky, and Carr entered the water in a failed attempt to save her. Neither of their bodies were ever recovered, though a memorial to Carr was erected at Bangor's Mount Hope Cemetery.

Carr was married to Betsey Stelle Jarvis, who migrated to Illinois along with two brothers following the tragedy on the river. The Carrs remained a prominent mercantile and political family in Bangor despite James' death (see Francis Carr).

U.S. House of Representatives
| Preceded by Abiel Wood | Member of the U.S. House of Representatives from Massachusetts's 17th congressional district (Maine district); March 4, 1815 – March 3, 1817 | Succeeded by John Wilson |
