= Martin Kinsley =

American politician (1754–1835)

Member of the U.S. House of Representatives from Massachusetts's 17th district
- In office March 4, 1819 – March 3, 1821
- Preceded by: John Wilson
- Succeeded by: District eliminated

Member of the Massachusetts House of Representatives
- In office 1790–1792; 1794–1796; 1801–1804; 1806

Treasurer of the Town of Hardwick

Member of the Massachusetts Governor's Council
- In office 1810–1811

Member of the Massachusetts Senate
- In office 1814

Judge of the Probate Court

Judge of the Court of Common Pleas
- In office 1811–1811

Personal details
- Born: June 2, 1754 Bridgewater, Province of Massachusetts Bay, British America
- Died: June 20, 1835 (aged 81) Roxbury, Massachusetts, U.S
- Party: Democratic-Republican
- Education: Harvard

Martin Kinsley (June 2, 1754 – June 20, 1835) was a U.S. representative from Massachusetts. Born in Bridgewater in the Province of Massachusetts Bay, Kinsley graduated from Harvard College in 1778. He studied medicine. He became a purveyor of supplies in the Revolutionary Army. He served as Treasurer of the Town of Hardwick. He moved to Hampden, and was a representative of that town in the Massachusetts House of Representatives. He was an unsuccessful candidate for the U.S. House in 1801 and 1802. He served as member of the executive council in 1810 and 1811, as a judge of the court of common pleas in 1811, as judge of the probate court, and served in the Massachusetts State Senate.

Kinsley was elected as a Democratic-Republican to the Sixteenth Congress (March 4, 1819 – March 3, 1821). He was an unsuccessful candidate for reelection in 1820 to the Seventeenth Congress. He died in Roxbury, June 20, 1835.

U.S. House of Representatives
Preceded by John Wilson	Member of the U.S. House of Representatives from Massachusetts's 17th congressional district (Maine district); March 4, 1819 – March 3, 1821	Succeeded by District eliminated, Maine was set off as a state.
