= Francis Carr (District of Maine politician) =

American politician (1751–1821)

Member of the U.S. House of Representatives from Massachusetts's 17th district
- In office April 6, 1812 – March 4, 1813
- Preceded by: Barzillai Gannett
- Succeeded by: Abiel Wood

Personal details
- Born: December 6, 1751 Newbury, Province of Massachusetts Bay, British America
- Died: October 6, 1821 (aged 69) Bangor, Maine, U.S.
- Resting place: Mount Hope Cemetery
- Party: Democratic-Republican
- Spouse: Mary Elliot
- Children: Congressman James Carr

Francis Carr (December 6, 1751 – October 6, 1821) was a U.S. representative from the District of Maine, which was then part of Massachusetts. He was also the father of U.S. Congressman James Carr, and the founder of a political and mercantile family in Bangor, Maine.

Carr was born and attended common schools in Newbury in the Province of Massachusetts Bay. He later moved to Haverhill, married Mary Elliot (b. 1755 in Amesbury), and engaged in the mercantile and shipbuilding business. He also represented Haverhill in the Massachusetts House of Representatives.

== Political career ==
In 1793, Carr moved to Bangor in Massachusetts' District of Maine, which had incorporated as a town only two years before. As in Haverhill, he was elected to represent the area in the Massachusetts House of Representatives (1806–1808), and later the Massachusetts State Senate (1809–1811).

Carr was the first citizen of Bangor to serve in the U.S. Congress. He was elected as a Democratic-Republican to the Twelfth Congress to fill the vacancy caused by the resignation of Barzillai Gannett and served from April 6, 1812, to March 3, 1813. He was an unsuccessful candidate for reelection in 1812 to the Thirteenth Congress, and resumed mercantile pursuits. In 1814, he witnessed the British sacking of Bangor following the rout of local militia in the Battle of Hampden. He died in Bangor, Maine, October 6, 1821, and was interred in Mount Hope Cemetery.

== Carr Family ==
The Carrs remained an important mercantile and political family in Bangor well into the 19th century. Francis' son James Carr succeeded him as a U.S. Congressman (1815–1817), though he died by drowning in 1818 on the Ohio River. Another family member, Joshua Wingate Carr (1796–1879), became Mayor of Bangor (1839–1840) and the city's U.S. Postmaster. The Carr-Wing House on State Street in Bangor, which Joshua Carr remodeled in the Gothic Revival style in 1844, remains a local architectural landmark. Joshua's great-grandson Elliott Carr Cutler (b. Bangor, 1888), became a famous surgeon and professor of surgery at the Harvard Medical School, while Elliott's brother Robert Cutler, became the first National Security Advisor under President Dwight Eisenhower. Robert wrote about the Carr-Wing House and his "Great-Uncle Frank" (Francis Wingate Carr) in his autobiography No Time for Rest (1966).

== Sources ==
- United States Congress. "Francis Carr (id: C000175)". Biographical Directory of the United States Congress.

U.S. House of Representatives
Preceded by Barzillai Gannett	Member of the U.S. House of Representatives from Massachusetts's 17th congressional district (Maine district); April 6, 1812 – March 4, 1813	Succeeded by Abiel Wood
