= Barzillai Gannett =

American politician (1764–1832)

Member of the U.S. House of Representatives from Massachusetts's 17th district
- In office March 4, 1809 – July 29, 1811
- Preceded by: John Chandler
- Succeeded by: Francis Carr

Member of the Massachusetts State Senate
- In office 1807–1807

Member Board of Selectmen and Assessors Gardiner Maine
- In office March 21, 1803 – 1804

Member Surveyors of HIghwayas Gardiner Maine
- In office March 21, 1803 – 1804

Town Clerk Pittston, Maine
- In office 1794–1795
- Preceded by: Seth Gay
- Succeeded by: Seth Gay

Member of the Massachusetts House of Representatives
- In office 1805-1806

Personal details
- Born: June 17, 1764 Bridgewater, Province of Massachusetts Bay, British America
- Died: 1832 (aged 67–68) New York City, New York, U.S.
- Party: Democratic-Republican
- Spouse: Elizabeth Farley
- Education: Harvard University

Barzillai Gannett (June 17, 1764 – 1832) was a U.S. representative from Massachusetts.

Born in Bridgewater in the Province of Massachusetts Bay, Gannett graduated from Harvard University in 1785. He studied theology, but did not enter the ministry. He served as Selectman of Pittston, Maine (then a district of Massachusetts). He also served as town clerk in 1794 and town moderator 1797–1802. Gannett was Selectman and assessor of Gardiner, Maine from 1803 to 1808. He was appointed as the first postmaster of Gardiner and served from September 30, 1804, to October 1, 1809. He also served as Town Moderator. Gannett served as member of both the Massachusetts House of Representatives and the Massachusetts State Senate.

Gannett was elected as a Democratic-Republican to the Eleventh and Twelfth Congresses and served from March 4, 1809, until his resignation in 1812.

Because of an accusation regarding a breach of trust Gannett left Maine, changed his name to Benjamin Gardiner, and moved to Ohio.

During about the year 1822 Barzillai Gannett (Benjamin Gardiner) again suddenly disappeared from Ohio.

Gannett died in New York City in 1832.

== Notes ==
U.S. House of Representatives
Preceded by John Chandler	Member of the U.S. House of Representatives from Massachusetts's 17th congressional district (Maine district); March 4, 1809 – July 29, 1811	Succeeded by Francis Carr
