= William Ely =

American politician

Member of the U.S. House of Representatives from Massachusetts's 5th district
- In office March 4, 1805 – March 3, 1815
- Preceded by: Thomas Dwight
- Succeeded by: Elijah H. Mills

Member of the Massachusetts House of Representatives
- In office 1801-1803
- In office 1814
- In office 1816

Personal details
- Born: August 14, 1765 Longmeadow, Province of Massachusetts Bay, British America
- Died: October 9, 1817 (aged 52) Springfield, Massachusetts, U.S.
- Party: Federalist
- Spouse: Abigail Bliss(1768–1827)
- Education: Yale College
- Profession: Attorney

William Ely (August 14, 1765 – October 9, 1817) was a U.S. representative from Massachusetts.

== Early life and education ==
Ely was born in Longmeadow in the Province of Massachusetts Bay on August 14, 1765. He was the youngest son of Deacon Nathaniel Ely (1716–1799) and Abigail (Colton) Ely (1724–1770); his mother died when he was 5.

Ely completed preparatory studies. He was graduated from Yale College in 1787. He studied law. Ely was admitted to the bar in 1791.

== Career ==
Following this, Ely commenced practice in Springfield, Massachusetts.

Ely served as a member of the Massachusetts House of Representatives from 1801 to 1803.

Ely married Abigail Bliss about November 1, 1803.

Ely was elected as a Federalist to the Ninth and to the four succeeding Congresses (March 4, 1805 – March 3, 1815).

Ely was again a member of the Massachusetts House of Representatives in 1814 and 1816.

== Death ==
Ely died on October 9, 1817, in Springfield, Massachusetts; his wife survived him but died in 1827. They are buried in Springfield Cemetery.

U.S. House of Representatives
Preceded by Thomas Dwight	Member of the U.S. House of Representatives from Massachusetts's 5th congressional district March 4, 1805 – March 3, 1815	Succeeded by Elijah H. Mills
