= List of United States representatives from Massachusetts =

Massachusetts's congressional districts since 2023

The following is an alphabetical list of United States representatives from the commonwealth of Massachusetts. For chronological tables of members of both houses of the United States Congress from the state (through the present day), see Massachusetts's congressional delegations. The list of names should be complete, but other data may be incomplete.

== Current representatives ==
As of January 2026:

- 1st district: Richard Neal (D) (since 1989; 37 years ago)
- 2nd district: Jim McGovern (D) (since 1997; 29 years ago)
- 3rd district: Lori Trahan (D) (since 2019; 7 years ago)
- 4th district: Jake Auchincloss (D) (since 2021; 5 years ago)
- 5th district: Katherine Clark (D) (since 2013; 13 years ago)
- 6th district: Seth Moulton (D) (since 2015; 11 years ago)
- 7th district: Ayanna Pressley (D) (since 2019; 7 years ago)
- 8th district: Stephen Lynch (D) (since 2001; 25 years ago)
- 9th district: Bill Keating (D) (since 2011; 15 years ago)

== List of members ==
Member	Party	District	Years	Electoral history
Amos Abbott	Whig	3rd	March 4, 1843 – March 3, 1849	First elected in 1842. Retired.
Josiah Abbott	Democratic	4th	July 28, 1876 – March 3, 1877	Successfully contested Rufus S. Frost's election. Retired.
Benjamin Adams	Federalist	11th	December 2, 1816 – March 3, 1821	First elected to finish Elijah Brigham's term. Lost re-election to Johnathan Russell.
Charles F. Adams Sr.	Republican	3rd	March 4, 1859 – May 1, 1861	First elected in 1858. Resigned to become U.S. Minister to England.
John Quincy Adams	Anti-Jacksonian	11th	March 4, 1831 – March 3, 1833	First elected in 1830. Died.
John Quincy Adams	Anti-Masonic	12th	March 4, 1833 – March 3, 1837	First elected in 1830. Died.
John Quincy Adams	Whig	12th	March 4, 1837 – March 3, 1843	First elected in 1830. Died.
John Quincy Adams	Whig	8th	March 4, 1843 – February 23, 1848	First elected in 1830. Died.
Charles Allen	Free Soil	5th	March 4, 1849 – March 3, 1853	First elected in 1848. Retired.
Charles H. Allen	Republican	8th	March 4, 1885 – March 3, 1889	First elected in 1884. Retired.
Joseph Allen	Federalist	10th	October 8, 1810 – March 3, 1811	First elected to finish Jabez Upham's term. Retired.
Samuel C. Allen	Federalist (Note: Supported the Adams-Clay faction in the 1824 United States presidential election)	6th	March 4, 1817 – March 3, 1823	First elected in 1816. Retired.
Samuel C. Allen	Federalist	7th	March 4, 1823 – March 3, 1825	First elected in 1816. Retired.
Samuel C. Allen	Anti-Jacksonian	7th	March 4, 1825 – March 3, 1829	First elected in 1816. Retired.
John B. Alley	Republican	6th	March 4, 1859 – March 3, 1863	First elected in 1858. Retired.
John B. Alley	Republican	5th	March 4, 1863 – March 3, 1867	First elected in 1858. Retired.
James C. Alvord	Whig	6th	March 4, 1839 – September 27, 1839	First elected in 1838. Died.
Butler Ames	Republican	5th	March 4, 1903 – March 3, 1913	First elected in 1902. Retired.
Fisher Ames	Pro-Administration	1st	March 4, 1789 – March 3, 1795	First elected in 1788. Retired.
Fisher Ames	Federalist	8th	March 4, 1795 – March 3, 1797	First elected in 1788. Retired.
Oakes Ames	Republican	2nd	March 4, 1863 – March 3, 1873	First elected in 1862. Retired.
Abram Andrew	Republican	6th	September 27, 1921 – June 3, 1936	First elected to finish Willfred W. Lufkin's term. Died.
John F. Andrew	Democratic	3rd	March 4, 1889 – March 3, 1893	First elected in 1888. Lost re-election to Joseph H. Walker.
Nathan Appleton	Anti-Jacksonian	1st	March 4, 1831 – March 3, 1833	First elected in 1830. Retired.
Nathan Appleton	Whig	1st	June 9, 1842 – September 28, 1842	First elected to finish Robert C. Winthrop's term. Resigned.
William Appleton	Whig	1st	March 4, 1851 – March 3, 1853	First elected in 1850. Lost re-election to Anson Burlingame.
William Appleton	Whig	5th	March 4, 1853 – March 3, 1855	First elected in 1850. Lost re-election to Anson Burlingame.
William Appleton	Constitutional Union	5th	March 4, 1861 – September 27, 1861	First elected in 1860. Resigned because of failing health.
Louis D. Apsley	Republican	4th	March 4, 1893 – March 3, 1897	First elected in 1892. Retired.
George Ashmun	Whig	6th	March 4, 1845 – March 3, 1851	First elected in 1844. Retired.
Chester G. Atkins	Democratic	5th	January 3, 1985 – January 3, 1993	First elected in 1984. Lost renomination to Marty Meehan.
Harrison H. Atwood	Republican	10th	March 4, 1895 – March 3, 1897	First elected in 1894. Lost renomination to Samuel J. Barrows.
Jake Auchincloss	Democratic	4th	January 3, 2021 – present	First elected in 2020. Incumbent.
Ezekiel Bacon	Democratic-Republican	12th	September 16, 1807 – March 3, 1813	First elected to finish Barnabas Bidwell's term. Retired.
John Bacon	Democratic-Republican	1st	March 4, 1801 – March 3, 1803	First elected in 1800. [data missing]
Goldsmith Bailey	Republican	9th	March 4, 1861 – May 8, 1862	First elected in 1860. Died.
John Bailey	Democratic-Republican	10th	March 4, 1823 – March 18, 1824	First elected in 1823. Ruled ineligible to serve because not a resident of the district.
John Bailey	Anti-Jacksonian	10th	December 13, 1824 – March 3, 1831	First elected to finish his own term. Retired.
Osmyn Baker	Whig	6th	January 14, 1840 – March 3, 1845	First elected to finish James C. Alvord's term. Retired.
John D. Baldwin	Republican	8th	March 4, 1863 – March 3, 1869	First elected in 1862. Retired.
Nathaniel P. Banks	Democratic	7th	March 4, 1853 – March 4, 1855	First elected in 1852. Resigned to become Governor of Massachusetts.
Nathaniel P. Banks	Know Nothing	7th	March 4, 1855 – March 4, 1857	First elected in 1852. Resigned to become Governor of Massachusetts.
Nathaniel P. Banks	Republican	7th	March 4, 1857 – December 24, 1857	First elected in 1852. Resigned to become Governor of Massachusetts.
Nathaniel P. Banks	Republican	6th	December 4, 1865 – March 3, 1873	First elected to finish Daniel W. Gooch's term. Lost re-election to Benjamin F. Butler
Nathaniel P. Banks	Independent	5th	March 4, 1875 – March 3, 1877	Again elected in 1874. Lost renomination to Selwyn Z. Bowman.
Nathaniel P. Banks	Republican	5th	March 4, 1877 – March 3, 1879	Again elected in 1874. Lost renomination to Selwyn Z. Bowman.
Nathaniel P. Banks	Republican	5th	March 4, 1889 – March 3, 1891	Again elected in 1888. Retired.
Joseph Barker	Democratic-Republican	7th	March 4, 1805 – March 3, 1809	First elected in 1804. Retired.
William Barrett	Republican	7th	March 4, 1895 – March 3, 1899	First elected in 1894. Retired.
Samuel J. Barrows	Republican	10th	March 4, 1897 – March 3, 1899	First elected in 1896. Lost re-election to Henry F. Naphen.
Gideon Barstow	Democratic-Republican	2nd	March 4, 1821 – March 3, 1823	First elected late in 1821. Retired.
Bailey Bartlett	Federalist	11th	November 27, 1797 – March 3, 1801	First elected to finish Theophilus Bradbury's term. Retired.
George J. Bates	Republican	6th	January 3, 1937 – November 1, 1949	First elected in 1936. Died.
Isaac C. Bates	Anti-Jacksonian	8th	March 4, 1827 – March 3, 1835	First elected in 1827 on the third ballot. Retired.
William H. Bates	Republican	6th	February 14, 1950 – June 22, 1969	First elected to finish George J. Bates's term. Died.
Francis Baylies	Federalist (Note: Supported the Jackson faction in the 1824 United States presidential election)	10th	March 4, 1821 – March 3, 1823	First elected in 1820. Lost re-election to James L. Hodges.
Francis Baylies	Federalist	12th	March 4, 1823 – March 3, 1825	First elected in 1820. Lost re-election to James L. Hodges.
Francis Baylies	Jacksonian	12th	March 4, 1825 – March 3, 1827	First elected in 1820. Lost re-election to James L. Hodges.
William Baylies	Federalist	7th	March 4, 1809 – June 28, 1809	First elected in 1808. Succeeded by Charles Turner, Jr., who contested the election.
William Baylies	Federalist	7th	March 4, 1813 – March 4, 1815	[data missing]
William Baylies	Federalist	8th	March 4, 1815 – March 4, 1817	[data missing]
William Baylies	Anti-Jacksonian	10th	March 4, 1833 – March 4, 1835	[data missing] Lost re-election to Nathaniel B. Borden.
Barnabas Bidwell	Democratic-Republican	12th	March 4, 1805 – July 13, 1807	First elected in 1804. Resigned to become Massachusetts Attorney General.
Abijah Bigelow	Federalist	11th	October 8, 1810 – March 3, 1815	First elected to finish William Stedman's term. [data missing]
Lewis Bigelow	Federalist	12th	March 4, 1821 – March 3, 1823	First elected in 1820. Lost re-election to Francis Baylies.
Phanuel Bishop	Democratic-Republican	7th	March 4, 1799 – March 4, 1803	First elected in 1798. [data missing]
Phanuel Bishop	Democratic-Republican	9th	March 4, 1803 – March 4, 1807	First elected in 1798. [data missing]
Peter I. Blute	Republican	3rd	January 3, 1993 – January 3, 1997	First elected in 1992. Lost re-election to Jim McGovern.
Edward Boland	Democratic	2nd	January 3, 1953 – January 3, 1989	First elected in 1952. Retired.
Nathaniel B. Borden	Jacksonian	10th	March 4, 1835 – March 3, 1837	First elected in 1834. Lost re-election as a Whig.
Nathaniel B. Borden	Democratic	10th	March 4, 1837 – March 3, 1839	First elected in 1834. Lost re-election as a Whig.
Nathaniel B. Borden	Whig	10th	March 4, 1841 – March 3, 1843	[data missing]
Shearjashub Bourne	Pro-Administration	5th	March 4, 1791 – March 3, 1793	First elected in 1790. [data missing]
Shearjashub Bourne	Pro-Administration	3rd	March 4, 1793 – March 3, 1795	First elected in 1790. [data missing]
George S. Boutwell	Republican	7th	March 4, 1863 – March 12, 1869	First elected in 1862. Resigned to become U.S. Secretary of the Treasury.
Henry L. Bowles	Republican	2nd	September 23, 1925 – March 3, 1929	First elected to finish George B. Churchill's term. Retired.
Selwyn Z. Bowman	Republican	5th	March 4, 1879 – March 3, 1883	First elected in 1878. Lost re-election to Leopold Morse.
George Bradbury	Federalist	15th	March 4, 1813 – March 3, 1817	First elected in 1812. Lost renomination to Ezekiel Whitman.
Theophilus Bradbury	Federalist	11th	March 4, 1795 – July 24, 1797	First elected in 1794. Resigned to become a State justice.
George N. Briggs	Anti-Jacksonian	9th	March 4, 1831 – March 3, 1833	First elected in 1830. Retired.
George N. Briggs	Anti-Jacksonian	7th	March 4, 1833 – March 3, 1837	First elected in 1830. Retired.
George N. Briggs	Whig	7th	March 4, 1837 – March 3, 1843	First elected in 1830. Retired.
Elijah Brigham	Federalist	10th	March 4, 1811 – March 3, 1815	First elected in 1810. Died.
Elijah Brigham	Federalist	11th	March 4, 1815 – February 22, 1816	First elected in 1810. Died.
George M. Brooks	Republican	7th	November 2, 1869 – May 13, 1872	First elected to finish George S. Boutwell's term. Resigned to become Probate Judge for Middlesex County.
Benjamin Brown	Federalist	16th	March 4, 1815 – March 3, 1817	First elected in 1814. [data missing]
Phineas Bruce	Federalist	17th	Did not serve	Elected to serve starting March 4, 1803, but prevented by illness from qualifying.
James Buffinton	Know Nothing	2nd	March 4, 1855 – March 3, 1857	First elected in 1854. Died.
James Buffinton	Republican	2nd	March 4, 1857 – March 3, 1863	First elected in 1854. Died.
James Buffinton	Republican	1st	March 4, 1869 – March 7, 1875	First elected in 1854. Died.
Anson Burlingame	Know Nothing	5th	March 4, 1855 – March 3, 1857	First elected in 1854. Resigned to become U.S. Minister to China.
Anson Burlingame	Republican	5th	March 4, 1857 – March 3, 1861	First elected in 1854. Resigned to become U.S. Minister to China.
Stephen Bullock	Federalist	7th	March 4, 1797 – March 3, 1799	First elected in 1796. [data missing]
James A. Burke	Democratic	13th	January 3, 1959 – January 3, 1963	First elected in 1958. Retired.
James A. Burke	Democratic	11th	January 3, 1963 – January 3, 1979	First elected in 1958. Retired.
Barker Burnell	Whig	11th	March 4, 1841 – March 3, 1843	First elected in 1840. Died.
Barker Burnell	Whig	10th	March 4, 1843 – June 15, 1843	First elected in 1840. Died.
Edward Burnett	Democratic	9th	March 4, 1887 – March 3, 1889	First elected in 1884. Lost re-election to John W. Candler.
Benjamin F. Butler	Republican	5th	March 4, 1867 – March 3, 1873	First elected in 1866. Lost re-election to Charles Thompson.
Benjamin F. Butler	Republican	6th	March 4, 1873 – March 3, 1875	First elected in 1866. Lost re-election to Charles Thompson.
Benjamin F. Butler	Republican	7th	March 4, 1877 – March 3, 1879	First elected in 1876. Retired in to run for Governor of Massachusetts.
William B. Calhoun	Anti-Jacksonian	8th	March 4, 1835 – March 3, 1837	First elected in 1834. Retired.
William B. Calhoun	Whig	8th	March 4, 1837 – March 3, 1843	First elected in 1834. Retired.
John W. Candler	Republican	8th	March 4, 1881 – March 3, 1883	First elected in 1880. Lost re-election to Theodore Lyman.
John W. Candler	Republican	9th	March 4, 1889 – March 3, 1891	First elected in 1888. Lost re-election to George F. Williams.
Mike Capuano	Democratic	8th	January 3, 1999 – January 3, 2013	First elected in 1998. Lost renomination to Ayanna Pressley.
Mike Capuano	Democratic	7th	January 3, 2013 – January 3, 2019	First elected in 1998. Lost renomination to Ayanna Pressley.
Francis Carr	Democratic-Republican	17th	April 6, 1812 – March 3, 1813	First elected to finish Barzillai Gannett's term. Lost re-election to Abiel Wood.
James Carr	Federalist	17th	March 4, 1815 – March 3, 1817	First elected in 1815. [data missing]
William Henry Carter	Republican	13th	March 4, 1915 – March 3, 1919	First elected in 1914. Retired.
Joseph E. Casey	Democratic	3rd	January 3, 1935 – January 3, 1943	First elected in 1934. Retired.
Calvin C. Chaffee	Know Nothing	10th	March 4, 1855 – March 3, 1857	First elected in 1854. [data missing]
Calvin C. Chaffee	Republican	10th	March 4, 1857 – March 3, 1859	First elected in 1854. [data missing]
John Chandler	Democratic-Republican	17th	March 4, 1805 – March 3, 1809	First elected in 1804. Retired.
Chester W. Chapin	Democratic	11th	March 4, 1875 – March 3, 1877	First elected in 1874. Lost re-election to George D. Robinson.
Rufus Choate	Anti-Jacksonian	2nd	March 4, 1831 – June 30, 1834	First elected in 1830. Resigned.
George B. Churchill	Republican	2nd	March 4, 1925 – July 1, 1925	First elected in 1924. Died.
William Claflin	Republican	8th	March 4, 1877 – March 3, 1881	First elected in 1876. Retired.
Katherine Clark	Democratic	5th	December 10, 2013 – present	First elected to finish Ed Markey's term. Incumbent
Charles Clason	Republican	2nd	January 3, 1937 – January 3, 1949	First elected in 1936. Lost re-election to Foster Furcolo.
David Cobb	Pro-Administration	At large	March 4, 1793 – March 3, 1795	First elected in 1792. Redistricted to the 7th district but lost re-election.
Peleg Coffin Jr.	Pro-Administration	3rd	March 4, 1793 – March 3, 1795	First elected in 1792. [data missing]
William Cogswell	Republican	7th	March 4, 1887 – March 3, 1893	First elected in 1886. Died.
William Cogswell	Republican	6th	March 4, 1893 – May 22, 1895	First elected in 1886. Died.
Patrick A. Collins	Democratic	4th	March 4, 1883 – March 3, 1889	First elected in 1882. Retired.
Linus B. Comins	Know Nothing	4th	March 4, 1855 – March 3, 1857	First elected in 1854. [data missing]
Linus B. Comins	Republican	4th	March 4, 1857 – March 3, 1859	First elected in 1854. [data missing]
Samuel S. Conner	Democratic-Republican	19th	March 4, 1815 – March 3, 1817	First elected in 1815. [data missing]
Lawrence J. Connery	Democratic	7th	September 28, 1937 – October 19, 1941	First elected to finish William P. Connery Jr.'s term. Died.
William P. Connery Jr.	Democratic	7th	March 4, 1923 – June 15, 1937	First elected in 1922. Died.
Joseph A. Conry	Democratic	9th	March 4, 1901 – March 3, 1903	First elected in 1900. Lost re-election to John A. Keliher.
Silvio O. Conte	Republican	1st	January 3, 1959 – February 8, 1991	First elected in 1958. Died.
Orchard Cook	Democratic-Republican	16th	March 4, 1805 – March 3, 1811	First elected in 1804. Retired.
Frederick S. Coolidge	Democratic	11th	March 4, 1891 – March 3, 1893	First elected in 1890. Lost re-election to William F. Draper.
William W. Crapo	Republican	1st	November 2, 1875 – March 3, 1883	[data missing] Retired.
Alvah Crocker	Republican	9th	January 2, 1872 – March 3, 1873	[data missing] Died.
Alvah Crocker	Republican	10th	March 4, 1873 – December 26, 1874	[data missing] Died.
Samuel L. Crocker	Whig	2nd	March 4, 1853 – March 3, 1855	First elected in 1852. Lost re-election to James Buffinton.
Paul W. Cronin	Republican	5th	January 3, 1973 – January 3, 1975	First elected in 1972. Lost re-election to Paul Tsongas.
John Crosby	Democratic	12th	March 4, 1891 – March 3, 1893	First elected in 1890. Lost re-election to Elijah A. Morse.
Benjamin W. Crowninshield	Democratic-Republican	2nd	March 4, 1823 – March 3, 1825	First elected in 1823. Lost re-election to Rufus Choate.
Benjamin W. Crowninshield	Anti-Jacksonian	2nd	March 4, 1825 – March 3, 1831	First elected in 1823. Lost re-election to Rufus Choate.
Jacob Crowninshield	Democratic-Republican	2nd	March 4, 1803 – April 15, 1808	First elected in 1802. Died.
James Michael Curley	Democratic	10th	March 4, 1911 – March 3, 1913	First elected in 1910. Resigned to become Mayor of Boston.
James Michael Curley	Democratic	12th	March 4, 1913 – February 4, 1914	First elected in 1910. Resigned to become Mayor of Boston.
James Michael Curley	Democratic	11th	March 4, 1943 – March 3, 1947	First elected in 1942. Retired to become Mayor of Boston.
Laurence Curtis	Republican	10th	January 3, 1953 – January 3, 1963	First elected in 1952. Retired.
Caleb Cushing	Anti-Jacksonian	3rd	March 4, 1835 – March 3, 1837	First elected in 1834. Retired.
Caleb Cushing	Whig	3rd	March 4, 1837 – March 3, 1843	First elected in 1834. Retired.
Joshua Cushman	Democratic-Republican	19th	March 4, 1819 – March 3, 1821	First elected in 1818. District moved to Maine.
Manasseh Cutler	Federalist	11th	March 4, 1801 – March 3, 1803	First elected in 1800. Retired.
Manasseh Cutler	Federalist	3rd	March 4, 1803 – March 3, 1805	First elected in 1800. Retired.
Richard Cutts	Democratic-Republican	14th	March 4, 1801 – March 3, 1813	First elected in 1800. Lost re-election to Cyrus King.
Frederick W. Dallinger	Republican	8th	March 4, 1915 – March 3, 1925	First elected in 1914. Retired to run for U.S. senator.
Frederick W. Dallinger	Republican	8th	November 2, 1926 – October 1, 1932	Again elected to finish Harry Irving Thayer's term. Resigned to become judge of the U.S. Customs Court.
William S. Damrell	Know Nothing	3rd	March 4, 1855 – March 3, 1857	First elected in 1854. Retired, possibly due to illness.
William S. Damrell	Republican	3rd	March 4, 1857 – March 3, 1859	First elected in 1854. Retired, possibly due to illness.
Samuel Dana	Democratic-Republican	4th	September 22, 1814 – March 3, 1815	First elected to finish William M. Richardson's term. Lost re-election to Asahel Stearns.
George T. Davis	Whig	6th	March 4, 1851 – March 3, 1853	First elected in 1850. Retired.
John Davis	Anti-Jacksonian	5th	March 4, 1825 – March 3, 1829	First elected in 1825. Resigned when elected Governor of Massachusetts.
John Davis	Anti-Jacksonian	5th	March 4, 1829 – January 14, 1834	First elected in 1825. Resigned when elected Governor of Massachusetts.
Robert T. Davis	Republican	1st	March 4, 1883 – March 3, 1889	First elected in 1882. Retired.
Samuel Davis	Federalist	16th	March 4, 1813 – March 3, 1815	First elected in 1812. [data missing]
Timothy Davis	Know Nothing	6th	March 4, 1855 – March 3, 1857	First elected in 1854. [data missing]
Timothy Davis	Republican	6th	March 4, 1857 – March 3, 1859	First elected in 1854. [data missing]
Henry L. Dawes	Republican	11th	March 4, 1857 – March 3, 1863	First elected in 1856. Retired to run for U.S. senator.
Henry L. Dawes	Republican	10th	March 4, 1863 – March 3, 1873	First elected in 1856. Retired to run for U.S. senator.
Henry L. Dawes	Republican	11th	March 4, 1873 – March 3, 1875	First elected in 1856. Retired to run for U.S. senator.
Benjamin Dean	Democratic	3rd	March 28, 1878 – March 3, 1879	Successfully contested Walbridge A. Field's election. Retired.
Josiah Dean	Democratic-Republican	9th	March 4, 1807 – March 3, 1809	First elected in 1806. [data missing]
Henry Dearborn	Anti-Administration	4th	March 4, 1793 – March 3, 1795	First elected in 1792. [data missing]
Henry Dearborn	Democratic-Republican	12th	March 4, 1795 – March 3, 1797	First elected in 1792. [data missing]
Henry A.S. Dearborn	Anti-Jacksonian	10th	March 4, 1831 – March 3, 1833	First elected in 1830. Lost re-election to William Baylies.
Frederick Simpson Deitrick	Democratic	8th	March 4, 1913 – March 3, 1915	First elected in 1912. Lost re-election to Frederick Dallinger.
William Delahunt	Democratic	10th	January 3, 1997 – January 3, 2011	First elected in 1996. Retired.
Charles Delano	Republican	10th	March 4, 1859 – March 3, 1863	First elected in 1858. Retired.
Daniel Dewey	Federalist	12th	March 4, 1813 – February 24, 1814	First elected in 1812. Died.
Alexander DeWitt	Free Soil	9th	March 4, 1853 – March 3, 1855	First elected in 1852. Lost re-election to Eli Thayer.
Alexander DeWitt	Know Nothing	9th	March 4, 1855 – March 3, 1857	First elected in 1852. Lost re-election to Eli Thayer.
Samuel Dexter	Pro-Administration	1st	March 4, 1793 – March 3, 1795	First elected in 1792. [data missing]
Edward Dickinson	Whig	10th	March 4, 1853 – March 3, 1855	First elected in 1852. [data missing]
Brian J. Donnelly	Democratic	11th	January 3, 1979 – January 3, 1993	First elected in 1978. Retired.
Harold Donohue	Democratic	4th	January 3, 1947 – January 3, 1973	[data missing] Retired.
Harold Donohue	Democratic	3rd	January 3, 1973 – December 31, 1974	[data missing] Retired.
John J. Douglass	Democratic	10th	March 4, 1925 – March 3, 1933	First elected in 1924. Lost renomination to John P. Higgins.
John J. Douglass	Democratic	11th	March 3, 1933 – January 3, 1935	First elected in 1924. Lost renomination to John P. Higgins.
Edward Dowse	Democratic-Republican	13th	March 4, 1819 – May 26, 1820	First elected in 1818. Resigned.
William F. Draper	Republican	11th	March 3, 1893 – March 4, 1897	First elected in 1892. Retired.
Robert Drinan	Democratic	3rd	January 3, 1971 – January 3, 1973	First elected in 1970. Retired on the orders of the Pope.
Robert Drinan	Democratic	4th	January 3, 1973 – January 3, 1981	First elected in 1970. Retired on the orders of the Pope.
James H. Duncan	Whig	3rd	March 4, 1849 – March 3, 1853	First elected in 1848. [data missing]
Henry W. Dwight	Federalist	7th	March 4, 1821 – March 3, 1823	First elected in 1820. Retired.
Henry W. Dwight	Federalist	9th	March 4, 1823 – March 3, 1825	First elected in 1820. Retired.
Henry W. Dwight	Anti-Jacksonian	9th	March 4, 1825 – March 3, 1831	First elected in 1820. Retired.
Thomas Dwight	Federalist	5th	March 4, 1803 – March 3, 1805	First elected in 1802. [data missing]
Joseph D. Early	Democratic	3rd	January 3, 1975 – January 3, 1993	First elected in 1974. Lost re-election to Peter Blute.
J. Wiley Edmands	Whig	3rd	March 4, 1853 – March 3, 1855	First elected in 1852. Retired.
Samuel A. Eliot	Whig	1st	August 22, 1850 – March 3, 1851	[data missing] Retired.
Thomas D. Eliot	Whig	1st	April 17, 1854 – March 3, 1855	[data missing] Retired.
Thomas D. Eliot	Republican	1st	March 4, 1859 – March 3, 1869	First elected in 1858. Retired again.
Thomas H. Eliot	Democratic	9th	January 3, 1941 – January 3, 1943	First elected in 1940. Lost renomination to James M. Curley.
Fredrick D. Ely	Republican	9th	March 4, 1885 – March 3, 1887	First elected in 1884. Lost re-election to Edward Burnett.
William Ely	Federalist	5th	March 4, 1805 – March 3, 1815	First elected in 1804. [data missing]
Constantine C. Esty	Republican	7th	December 2, 1872 – March 3, 1873	[data missing] Retired.
William Eustis	Democratic-Republican	8th	March 4, 1801 – March 3, 1803	First elected in 1800. Lost re-election to Lemuel Williams.
William Eustis	Democratic-Republican	1st	March 4, 1803 – March 3, 1805	First elected in 1800. Lost re-election to Lemuel Williams.
William Eustis	Democratic-Republican	13th	August 21, 1820 – March 3, 1823	[data missing] Retired to run for Governor of Massachusetts.
Edward Everett	Anti-Jacksonian	4th	March 4, 1825 – March 3, 1835	First elected in 1824. Retired.
William Everett	Democratic	7th	April 25, 1893 – March 3, 1895	[data missing] Retired.
Francis B. Fay	Whig	2nd	December 13, 1852 – March 3, 1853	[data missing] Retired.
Walbridge A. Field	Republican	3rd	March 4, 1877 – March 28, 1878	First elected in 1876. Lost election contest to Benjamin Dean.
Walbridge A. Field	Republican	3rd	March 4, 1879 – March 3, 1881	Again elected in 1878. Became justice of the Supreme Judicial Court.
John F. Fitzgerald	Democratic	9th	March 4, 1895 – March 3, 1901	First elected in 1894. Retired.
John F. Fitzgerald	Democratic	10th	March 4, 1919 – October 23, 1919	First elected in 1918. Peter Tague successfully contested his election.
Thomas A. Flaherty	Democratic	11th	December 14, 1937 – January 3, 1943	First elected to finish John P. Higgins's term. Retired.
Richard Fletcher	Whig	1st	March 4, 1837 – March 3, 1839	First elected in 1836. Retired.
Walter Folger Jr.	Democratic-Republican	9th	March 4, 1817 – March 3, 1821	First elected in 1816. [data missing]
Eugene Foss	Democratic	14th	March 22, 1910 – January 4, 1911	[data missing] Resigned to become Governor.
Frank H. Foss	Republican	3rd	March 4, 1925 – January 3, 1935	First elected in 1924. Lost re-election to Joseph Casey.
Dwight Foster	Pro-Administration	2nd	March 4, 1793 – March 3, 1795	First elected in 1792. Resigned when elected U.S. senator.
Dwight Foster	Federalist	4th	March 4, 1795 – June 6, 1800	First elected in 1792. Resigned when elected U.S. senator.
Orin Fowler	Whig	9th	March 4, 1849 – September 3, 1852	First elected in 1848. Died.
Barney Frank	Democratic	4th	January 3, 1981 – January 3, 2013	First elected in 1980. Retired.
Nathaniel Freeman Jr.	Democratic-Republican	5th	March 4, 1795 – March 3, 1799	First elected in 1794. [data missing]
Rufus S. Frost	Republican	4th	March 4, 1875 – July 28, 1876	First elected in 1874. Lost election contest to Josiah Abbott.
Louis A. Frothingham	Republican	14th	March 4, 1921 – August 23, 1928	First elected in 1920. Died.
Alvan T. Fuller	Republican	9th	March 4, 1917 – January 5, 1921	First elected in 1916. Resigned to become Lieutenant Governor.
Timothy Fuller	Democratic-Republican	4th	March 4, 1817 – March 3, 1825	First elected in 1816. [data missing]
Foster Furcolo	Democratic	2nd	January 3, 1949 – September 30, 1952	First elected in 1948. Resigned to become state Treasurer.
Joshua Gage	Democratic-Republican	19th	March 4, 1817 – March 3, 1819	First elected in 1816. [data missing]
James A. Gallivan	Democratic	12th	April 7, 1914 – April 3, 1928	First elected to finish James Michael Curley's term. Died.
Barzillai Gannett	Democratic-Republican	17th	March 4, 1809 – 1812	First elected in 1808. Resigned.
Augustus P. Gardner	Republican	6th	November 4, 1902 – May 15, 1917	[data missing] Resigned to join the U.S. Army during World War I.
Gideon Gardner	Democratic-Republican	8th	March 4, 1809 – March 3, 1811	First elected in 1808. [data missing]
Elbridge Gerry	Anti-Administration	3rd	March 4, 1789 – March 3, 1793	First elected in 1788. Retired.
Charles L. Gifford	Republican	16th	November 7, 1922 – March 4, 1933	First elected to finish Joseph Walsh's term. Died.
Charles L. Gifford	Republican	15th	March 4, 1933 – January 3, 1943	First elected to finish Joseph Walsh's term. Died.
Charles L. Gifford	Republican	9th	January 3, 1943 – August 23, 1947	First elected to finish Joseph Walsh's term. Died.
Frederick H. Gillett	Republican	2nd	March 4, 1893 – March 3, 1925	First elected in 1892. Retired to run for U.S. senator.
Edward Gilmore	Democratic	14th	March 4, 1913 – March 3, 1915	First elected in 1912. [data missing]
Daniel W. Gooch	Republican	7th	January 31, 1858 – March 3, 1863	[data missing] Resigned.
Daniel W. Gooch	Republican	6th	March 4, 1863 – September 1, 1865	[data missing] Resigned.
Daniel W. Gooch	Republican	5th	March 4, 1873 – March 3, 1875	[data missing] Lost re-election to Nathaniel P. Banks.
Benjamin Goodhue	Pro-Administration	2nd	March 4, 1789 – March 3, 1793	First elected in 1788. Resigned.
Benjamin Goodhue	Pro-Administration	1st	March 4, 1793 – March 3, 1795	First elected in 1788. Resigned.
Benjamin Goodhue	Federalist	10th	March 4, 1795 – June 1796	First elected in 1788. Resigned.
John Z. Goodrich	Whig	7th	March 4, 1851 – March 3, 1853	First elected in 1850. [data missing]
John Z. Goodrich	Whig	11th	March 4, 1853 – March 3, 1855	First elected in 1850. [data missing]
Angier L. Goodwin	Republican	8th	January 3, 1943 – March 3, 1955	First elected in 1942. Lost re-election to Torbert H. Macdonald.
Benjamin Gorham	Democratic-Republican	1st	November 6, 1820 – March 3, 1823	First elected to finish Jonathan Mason's term. [data missing]
Benjamin Gorham	Anti-Jacksonian	1st	July 23, 1827 – March 3, 1831	Again elected to finish Daniel Webster's term. [data missing]
Benjamin Gorham	Anti-Jacksonian	1st	March 4, 1833 – March 3, 1835	Again elected in 1833. [data missing]
William J. Granfield	Democratic	2nd	February 11, 1930 – January 3, 1937	[data missing] Retired to become justice of the Massachusetts District Court.
Isaiah L. Green	Democratic-Republican	8th	March 4, 1805 – March 3, 1809	First elected in 1804. [data missing]
Isaiah L. Green	Democratic-Republican	8th	March 4, 1811 – March 3, 1813	First elected in 1804. [data missing]
William S. Greene	Republican	13th	May 31, 1898 – March 3, 1913	[data missing] Died.
William S. Greene	Republican	15th	March 4, 1913 – September 22, 1924	[data missing] Died.
Frederic T. Greenhalge	Republican	8th	March 4, 1889 – March 3, 1891	First elected in 1888. Lost re-election to Moses T. Stevens.
George Grennell Jr.	Anti-Jacksonian	7th	March 4, 1829 – March 3, 1833	First elected in 1828. [data missing]
George Grennell Jr.	Anti-Jacksonian	6th	March 4, 1833 – March 3, 1837	First elected in 1828. [data missing]
George Grennell Jr.	Whig	6th	March 4, 1837 – March 3, 1839	First elected in 1828. [data missing]
Joseph Grinnell	Whig	10th	December 7, 1843 – March 4, 1851	First elected to finish Barker Burnell's term. [data missing]
Jonathan Grout	Anti-Administration	8th	March 4, 1789 – March 3, 1791	First elected in 1788. [data missing]
Artemas Hale	Whig	9th	March 4, 1845 – March 3, 1849	First elected late in 1846. [data missing]
Robert B. Hall	Know Nothing	1st	March 4, 1855 – March 3, 1857	First elected in 1854. [data missing]
Robert B. Hall	Republican	1st	March 4, 1857 – March 3, 1859	First elected in 1854. [data missing]
Michael J. Harrington	Democratic	6th	September 30, 1969 – January 3, 1979	First elected to finish William H. Bates's term. Retired.
Benjamin W. Harris	Republican	2nd	March 4, 1873 – March 3, 1883	First elected in 1872. Retired.
Robert O. Harris	Republican	14th	March 4, 1911 – March 4, 1913	First elected in 1910. Retired.
Seth Hastings	Federalist	4th	August 24, 1801 – March 4, 1803	First Elected to finish Levi Lincoln Sr.'s term. Retired.
Seth Hastings	Federalist	10th	March 4, 1803 – March 4, 1807	First Elected to finish Levi Lincoln Sr.'s term. Retired.
William S. Hastings	Whig	9th	March 4, 1837 – June 17, 1842	First elected in 1836. Died.
Edward D. Hayden	Republican	5th	March 4, 1885 – March 3, 1889	First elected in 1884. Retired.
Arthur D. Healey	Democratic	8th	March 4, 1933 – August 3, 1942	First elected in 1932. Resigned to become judge to U.S. District Court for Massachusetts.
Margaret Heckler	Republican	10th	January 3, 1967 – January 3, 1983	First elected in 1966. Lost re-election to Barney Frank in a districting contest.
Christian Herter	Republican	10th	January 3, 1943 – January 3, 1953	First elected in 1942. [data missing]
John W. Heselton	Republican	1st	January 3, 1945 – January 3, 1959	First elected in 1944. Retired.
Louise Day Hicks	Democratic	9th	January 3, 1971 – January 3, 1973	First elected in 1970. [data missing]
John P. Higgins	Democratic	11th	January 3, 1935 – September 30, 1937	First elected in 1934. Resigned to become Chief Justice of the Superior Court of Massachusetts.
Mark Langdon Hill	Democratic-Republican	16th	March 4, 1819 – March 3, 1821	First elected in 1819. District moved to Maine.
Ebenezer R. Hoar	Republican	7th	March 4, 1873 – March 4, 1875	First elected in 1872. [data missing]
George Frisbie Hoar	Republican	8th	March 4, 1869 – March 4, 1873	First elected in 1868. [data missing]
George Frisbie Hoar	Republican	9th	March 4, 1873 – March 4, 1877	First elected in 1868. [data missing]
Rockwood Hoar	Republican	3rd	March 4, 1905 – November 1, 1906	First elected in 1904. Died.
Samuel Hoar	Anti-Jacksonian	4th	March 4, 1835 – March 4, 1837	First elected in 1834. Lost re-election to William Parmenter.
Sherman Hoar	Democratic	5th	March 4, 1891 – March 3, 1893	First elected in 1890. [data missing]
Aaron Hobart	Democratic-Republican	8th	November 24, 1820 – March 4, 1823	First elected to finish Zabdiel Sampson's term. Retired.
Aaron Hobart	Democratic-Republican	11th	March 4, 1823 – March 4, 1825	First elected to finish Zabdiel Sampson's term. Retired.
Aaron Hobart	Anti-Jacksonian	11th	March 4, 1825 – March 4, 1827	First elected to finish Zabdiel Sampson's term. Retired.
James L. Hodges	Anti-Jacksonian	12th	March 4, 1827 – March 4, 1833	First elected in 1827 on the third ballot. Retired.
John Holmes	Democratic-Republican	14th	March 4, 1817 – March 15, 1820	First elected in 1816. Resigned.
Pehr G. Holmes	Republican	4th	March 4, 1931 – January 3, 1947	First elected in 1930. Lost re-election to Harold Donohue.
Samuel Holten	Anti-Administration	1st	March 4, 1793 – March 3, 1795	First elected in 1792. [data missing]
Samuel Hooper	Republican	5th	December 2, 1861 – March 4, 1863	[data missing] Died.
Samuel Hooper	Republican	4th	March 4, 1863 – February 14, 1875	[data missing] Died.
Levi Hubbard	Democratic-Republican	20th	March 4, 1813 – March 3, 1815	First elected in 1812. [data missing]
Charles Hudson	Whig	5th	May 3, 1841 – March 3, 1849	First elected to finish Levi Lincoln Jr.'s term. Lost re-election to Charles Allen.
John W. Hulbert	Federalist	12th	September 26, 1814 – March 4, 1815	First elected to finish Daniel Dewey's term. Retired.
John W. Hulbert	Federalist	7th	March 4, 1815 – March 3, 1817	First elected to finish Daniel Dewey's term. Retired.
Daniel Ilsley	Democratic-Republican	15th	March 4, 1807 – March 3, 1809	First elected in 1806. Lost re-election to Ezekiel Whitman.
William Jackson	Anti-Masonic	9th	March 4, 1833 – March 3, 1837	First elected in 1833. Retired.
Will Kirk Kaynor	Republican	2nd	March 4, 1929 – December 20, 1929	First elected in 1928. Died.
William R. Keating	Democratic	10th	January 3, 2011 – January 3, 2013	First elected in 2010. Incumbent
William R. Keating	Democratic	9th	January 3, 2013 – present	First elected in 2010. Incumbent
Hastings Keith	Republican	9th	January 3, 1959 – January 3, 1963	First elected in 1958. Retired.
Hastings Keith	Republican	12th	January 3, 1963 – January 3, 1973	First elected in 1958. Retired.
John A. Keliher	Democratic	9th	March 4, 1903 – March 4, 1911	First elected in 1902. Lost renomination, then lost re-election as an independent.
Jonas Kendall	Federalist	12th	March 4, 1819 – March 4, 1821	First elected in 1818. Lost re-election to Lewis Bigelow.
Joseph G. Kendall	Anti-Jacksonian	6th	March 4, 1829 – March 4, 1833	First elected in 1828. Retired.
John F. Kennedy	Democratic	11th	January 3, 1947 – January 3, 1953	First elected in 1946. Retired to run for U.S. senator.
Joseph P. Kennedy II	Democratic	8th	January 3, 1987 – January 3, 1999	First elected in 1986. Retired.
Joseph P. Kennedy III	Democratic	4th	January 3, 2013 – January 3, 2021	First elected in 2012. Retired to run for U.S. senator.
Cyrus King	Federalist	14th	March 4, 1813 – March 4, 1817	First elected in 1812. [data missing]
Daniel P. King	Whig	2nd	March 4, 1843 – July 25, 1850	First elected in 1843. Died.
Martin Kinsley	Democratic-Republican	17th	March 4, 1819 – March 4, 1821	First elected in 1819. Lost re-election to William D. Williamson.
Chauncey L. Knapp	Know Nothing	8th	March 4, 1855 – March 3, 1857	First elected in 1854. [data missing]
Chauncey L. Knapp	Republican	8th	March 4, 1857 – March 3, 1859	First elected in 1854. [data missing]
William S. Knox	Republican	5th	March 4, 1895 – March 3, 1903	First elected in 1894. Retired.
Thomas J. Lane	Democratic	7th	December 30, 1941 – January 3, 1963	First elected to finish Lawrence J. Connery's term. Lost renomination to Torbert Macdonald.
Simon Larned	Democratic-Republican	12th	November 5, 1804 – March 3, 1805	First elected to finish Thomson J. Skinner's term. Retired.
Samuel Lathrop	Federalist	5th	March 4, 1819 – March 4, 1823	First elected in 1819. [data missing]
Samuel Lathrop	Federalist	8th	March 4, 1823 – March 4, 1825	Again elected in 1822. [data missing]
Samuel Lathrop	Anti-Jacksonian	8th	March 4, 1825 – March 4, 1827	Again elected in 1822. [data missing]
Abbott Lawrence	Anti-Jacksonian	1st	March 4, 1835 – March 3, 1837	First elected in 1834. Resigned.
Abbott Lawrence	Whig	1st	March 4, 1839 – September 18, 1840	First elected in 1834. Resigned.
George P. Lawrence	Republican	1st	November 2, 1897 – March 3, 1913	First elected to finish Ashley B. Wright's term. Retired.
Robert M. Leach	Republican	15th	November 4, 1924 – March 4, 1925	First elected to finish William Greene's term. Retired.
Silas Lee	Federalist	12th	March 4, 1799 – August 20, 1801	First elected in 1798. Resigned.
George Leonard	Pro-Administration	7th	March 4, 1789 – March 4, 1791	First elected in 1788. [data missing]
George Leonard	Pro-Administration	6th	March 4, 1791 – March 4, 1793	First elected in 1788. [data missing]
George Leonard	Federalist	7th	March 4, 1795 – March 4, 1797	First elected in 1788. [data missing]
Enoch Lincoln	Democratic-Republican	20th	November 4, 1818 – March 3, 1821	[data missing] District moved to Maine.
Levi Lincoln Sr.	Democratic-Republican	4th	December 15, 1800 – March 5, 1801	First elected to finish Dwight Foster's term. Resigned to become U.S. Attorney General.
Levi Lincoln Jr.	Anti-Jacksonian	5th	February 17, 1834 – March 4, 1837	Elected to finish John Davis's term. Resigned to become Collector of the Port of Boston.
Levi Lincoln Jr.	Whig	5th	March 4, 1837 – March 16, 1841	Elected to finish John Davis's term. Resigned to become Collector of the Port of Boston.
Edward P. Little	Democratic	9th	December 13, 1852 – March 3, 1853	[data missing] Retired.
Edward St. Loe Livermore	Federalist	3rd	March 4, 1807 – March 3, 1811	First elected in 1806. Retired.
John Locke	Democratic-Republican	6th	March 4, 1823 – March 3, 1825	First elected in 1823. Retired.
John Locke	Anti-Jacksonian	6th	March 4, 1825 – March 3, 1829	First elected in 1823. Retired.
Henry Cabot Lodge	Republican	6th	March 4, 1887 – March 3, 1893	First elected in 1886. Resigned to become U.S. senator.
John D. Long	Republican	2nd	March 4, 1883 – March 3, 1889	First elected in 1882. Retired.
George B. Loring	Republican	6th	March 4, 1877 – March 3, 1881	First elected in 1876. Lost renomination to Eben Stone.
Henry B. Lovering	Democratic	6th	March 4, 1883 – March 4, 1887	First elected in 1882. Lost re-election to Henry Cabot Lodge.
William C. Lovering	Republican	12th	March 4, 1893 – March 4, 1903	First elected in 1892. Died.
William C. Lovering	Republican	14th	March 4, 1903 – February 4, 1910	First elected in 1892. Died.
Robert Luce	Republican	13th	March 4, 1919 – March 3, 1933	First elected in 1918. Lost re-election to Richard M. Russell.
Robert Luce	Republican	9th	March 4, 1933 – January 3, 1935	First elected in 1918. Lost re-election to Richard M. Russell.
Robert Luce	Republican	9th	January 3, 1937 – January 3, 1941	Again elected in 1936. Lost re-election to Thomas H. Eliot.
Willfred W. Lufkin	Republican	6th	November 6, 1917 – June 30, 1921	[data missing] Resigned to accept a Treasury position.
Samuel Lyman	Federalist	3rd	March 4, 1795 – November 6, 1800	First elected in 1794. Resigned.
Theodore Lyman	Independent Republican	9th	March 4, 1883 – March 4, 1885	First elected in 1882. [data missing]
William Lyman	Anti-Administration	2nd	March 4, 1793 – March 3, 1795	First elected in 1792. [data missing]
William Lyman	Democratic-Republican	2nd	March 4, 1795 – March 3, 1797	First elected in 1792. [data missing]
Stephen Lynch	Democratic	9th	October 16, 2001 – January 3, 2013	First elected to finish Joe Moakley's term. Incumbent
Stephen Lynch	Democratic	8th	January 3, 2013 – present	First elected to finish Joe Moakley's term. Incumbent
Torbert H. Macdonald	Democratic	8th	January 3, 1955 – January 3, 1963	First elected in 1954. Died.
Torbert H. Macdonald	Democratic	7th	January 3, 1963 – May 21, 1976	First elected in 1954. Died.
Robert S. Maloney	Republican	7th	March 4, 1921 – March 4, 1923	First elected in 1920. [data missing]
Horace Mann	Whig	8th	April 3, 1848 – March 4, 1853	First elected to finish John Quincy Adams's term. Retired to become president of Antioch College.
Ed Markey	Democratic	7th	November 2, 1976 – January 3, 2013	First elected to finish Torbert Macdonald's term.
Ed Markey	Democratic	5th	January 3, 2013 – July 15, 2013	[data missing] Resigned to become U.S. senator.
Joseph William Martin Jr.	Republican	15th	March 4, 1925 – March 3, 1933	First elected in 1924. Lost renomination to Margaret M. Heckler
Joseph William Martin Jr.	Republican	14th	March 4, 1933 – January 3, 1963	First elected in 1924. Lost renomination to Margaret M. Heckler
Joseph William Martin Jr.	Republican	10th	January 3, 1963 – January 3, 1967	First elected in 1924. Lost renomination to Margaret M. Heckler
Jonathan Mason	Federalist	1st	March 4, 1813 – May 15, 1820	First elected in 1812. Resigned to pursue law practice.
Ebenezer Mattoon	Federalist	3rd	February 2, 1801 – March 3, 1803	First elected to finish Samuel Lyman's term. [data missing]
Nicholas Mavroules	Democratic	6th	January 3, 1979 – January 3, 1993	First elected in 1978. Lost re-election to Peter G. Torkildsen.
Samuel W. McCall	Republican	8th	March 4, 1893 – March 4, 1913	First elected in 1892. [data missing]
John W. McCormack	Democratic	12th	November 6, 1928 – January 3, 1963	First elected to finish James A. Gallivan's term. Retired.
John W. McCormack	Democratic	9th	January 3, 1963 – January 3, 1971	First elected to finish James A. Gallivan's term. Retired.
Michael J. McEttrick	Independent Democratic	10th	March 4, 1893 – March 4, 1895	First elected in 1892. [data missing]
Jim McGovern	Democratic	3rd	January 3, 1997 – January 3, 2013	First elected in 1996. Incumbent
Jim McGovern	Democratic	2nd	January 3, 2013 – present	First elected in 1996. Incumbent
William S. McNary	Democratic	10th	March 4, 1903 – March 4, 1907	First elected in 1902. [data missing]
Marty Meehan	Democratic	5th	January 3, 1993 – July 1, 2007	First elected in 1992. Resigned to become Chancellor of the University of Massachusetts Lowell.
Elijah H. Mills	Federalist	5th	March 4, 1815 – March 3, 1819	First elected in 1814. Lost re-election to Samuel Lathrop.
John Joseph Mitchell	Democratic	4th	November 8, 1910 – March 4, 1911	First elected to finish Charles Q. Tirrell's term. Lost re-election to William H. Wilder.
John Joseph Mitchell	Democratic	13th	April 15, 1913 – March 3, 1915	First elected to finish John W. Weeks's term. Lost re-election to William Henry Carter.
Nahum Mitchell	Federalist	7th	March 4, 1803 – March 4, 1805	First elected in 1802. [data missing]
John Joseph Moakley	Democratic	9th	January 3, 1973 – May 28, 2001	First elected in 1972. Died.
William H. Moody	Republican	6th	November 5, 1895 – May 1, 1902	[data missing] Resigned to become U.S. Secretary of the Navy.
Elijah A. Morse	Republican	2nd	March 4, 1889 – March 4, 1893	First elected in 1888. Retired.
Elijah A. Morse	Republican	12th	March 4, 1893 – March 4, 1897	First elected in 1888. Retired.
Frank B. Morse	Republican	5th	January 3, 1961 – May 1, 1972	First elected in 1960. Resigned to become U.N. Under Secretary General for Political and General Assembly Affairs.
Leopold Morse	Democratic	4th	March 4, 1877 – March 3, 1883	First elected in 1876. Retired.
Leopold Morse	Democratic	5th	March 4, 1883 – March 4, 1885	First elected in 1876. Retired.
Leopold Morse	Democratic	3rd	March 4, 1887 – March 3, 1889	Again elected in 1886. Retired again.
Seth Moulton	Democratic	6th	January 3, 2015 – present	First elected in 2014. Incumbent; Retired to run for U.S. senator.
Marcus Morton	Democratic-Republican	10th	March 4, 1817 – March 3, 1821	First elected in 1816. Lost re-election to Francis Baylies.
William Francis Murray	Democratic	9th	March 4, 1911 – March 4, 1913	First elected in 1910. Resigned to become Postmaster of Boston.
William Francis Murray	Democratic	10th	March 4, 1913 – September 28, 1914	First elected in 1910. Resigned to become Postmaster of Boston.
Henry F. Naphen	Democratic	10th	March 4, 1899 – March 4, 1903	First elected in 1898. [data missing]
Richard Neal	Democratic	2nd	January 3, 1989 – January 3, 2013	First elected in 1988. Incumbent
Richard Neal	Democratic	1st	January 3, 2013 – present	First elected in 1988. Incumbent
Jeremiah Nelson	Federalist	3rd	March 4, 1805 – March 3, 1807	First elected in 1804. Retired.
Jeremiah Nelson	Federalist	3rd	March 4, 1815 – March 3, 1825	Elected to finish Daniel A. White's term. Retired.
Jeremiah Nelson	Anti-Jacksonian	3rd	March 4, 1831 – March 3, 1833	Again elected late on the thirteenth ballot in 1832. Retired.
Donald W. Nicholson	Republican	9th	November 18, 1947 – January 3, 1959	First elected to finish Charles L. Gifford's term. [data missing]
Amasa Norcross	Republican	10th	March 4, 1877 – March 4, 1883	First elected in 1876. [data missing]
Joseph F. O'Connell	Democratic	10th	March 4, 1907 – March 4, 1911	First elected in 1906. [data missing]
Richard II Olney	Democratic	14th	March 3, 1915 – March 4, 1921	First elected in 1914. [data missing]
John Olver	Democratic	1st	June 4, 1991 – January 3, 2013	First elected to finish Silvio Conte's term. Retired.
Joseph H. O'Neil	Democratic	4th	March 4, 1889 – March 4, 1893	First elected in 1888. Lost renomination to John F. Fitzgerald.
Joseph H. O'Neil	Democratic	9th	March 4, 1893 – March 4, 1895	First elected in 1888. Lost renomination to John F. Fitzgerald.
Tip O'Neill	Democratic	11th	January 3, 1953 – January 3, 1963	First elected in 1952. Retired.
Tip O'Neill	Democratic	8th	January 3, 1963 – January 3, 1987	First elected in 1952. Retired.
Benjamin Orr	Federalist	16th	March 4, 1817 – March 3, 1819	First elected in 1816. Retired.
Gayton P. Osgood	Jacksonian	3rd	March 4, 1833 – March 3, 1835	First elected in 1834. Lost re-election to Caleb Cushing.
Harrison Gray Otis	Federalist	8th	March 4, 1797 – March 4, 1801	First elected in 1796. [data missing]
Calvin D. Paige	Republican	3rd	November 4, 1913 – March 3, 1925	First elected in 1912. Retired.
John G. Palfrey	Whig	4th	March 4, 1847 – March 3, 1849	First elected in 1846. Lost re-election to Benjamin Thompson.
Isaac Parker	Federalist	12th	March 4, 1797 – March 3, 1799	First elected in 1796. Retired.
James Parker	Democratic-Republican	19th	March 4, 1813 – March 3, 1815	First elected in 1813. [data missing]
James Parker	Democratic-Republican	18th	March 4, 1819 – March 3, 1821	District moved to Maine.
William Parmenter	Democratic	4th	March 4, 1837 – March 3, 1845	First elected in 1836. [data missing]
Albion Parris	Democratic-Republican	20th	March 4, 1815 – February 3, 1818	First elected in 1814. Resigned to become U.S. District Judge.
George Partridge	Pro-Administration	5th	March 4, 1789 – August 14, 1790	First elected in 1788. Resigned.
Andrew J. Peters	Democratic	11th	March 4, 1907 – August 15, 1914	First elected in 1906. Resigned to become Assistant U.S. Secretary of the Treasury.
Michael Francis Phelan	Democratic	7th	March 4, 1913 – March 3, 1921	First elected in 1912. Lost re-election to Robert S. Maloney.
Philip J. Philbin	Democratic	3rd	January 3, 1943 – January 3, 1971	First elected in 1942. Lost renomination to Robert Drinan.
Stephen C. Phillips	Anti-Jacksonian	2nd	December 1, 1834 – March 3, 1837	[data missing] Resigned to become Mayor of Salem.
Stephen C. Phillips	Whig	2nd	March 4, 1837 – September 28, 1838	[data missing] Resigned to become Mayor of Salem.
Timothy Pickering	Federalist	3rd	March 4, 1813 – March 3, 1815	First elected in 1812. Retired.
Timothy Pickering	Federalist	2nd	March 4, 1815 – March 3, 1817	First elected in 1812. Retired.
Benjamin Pickman Jr.	Federalist	2nd	March 4, 1809 – March 3, 1811	First elected in 1808. Retired.
Henry L. Pierce	Republican	3rd	December 1, 1873 – March 3, 1877	First elected in 1872. Retired.
Samuel L. Powers	Republican	11th	March 4, 1901 – March 3, 1903	First elected in 1900. Retired.
Samuel L. Powers	Republican	12th	March 4, 1903 – March 3, 1905	First elected in 1900. Retired.
Ayanna Pressley	Democratic	7th	January 3, 2019 – present	First elected in 2018. Incumbent
Josiah III Quincy	Federalist	1st	March 4, 1805 – March 3, 1813	First elected in 1804. Retired.
Charles S. Randall	Republican	1st	March 4, 1889 – March 4, 1893	First elected in 1888. Lost renomination to John Simpkins.
Charles S. Randall	Republican	13th	March 4, 1893 – March 4, 1895	First elected in 1888. Lost renomination to John Simpkins.
Ambrose Ranney	Republican	3rd	March 4, 1881 – March 3, 1887	First elected in 1880. Lost re-election to Leopold Morse.
Robert Rantoul Jr.	Democratic	2nd	March 4, 1851 – August 7, 1852	First elected in 1850. Died.
Nathan Read	Federalist	10th	November 25, 1800 – March 4, 1803	First elected to finish Samuel Sewall's term. Retired.
William Reed	Federalist	2nd	March 4, 1811 – March 3, 1815	First elected in 1810. [data missing]
John Reed Sr.	Federalist	6th	March 4, 1795 – March 1, 1801	First elected in 1794. Retired.
John Reed Jr.	Federalist	8th	March 4, 1813 – March 4, 1815	First elected in 1812. Lost re-election to Walter Folger Jr.
John Reed Jr.	Federalist	9th	March 4, 1815 – March 4, 1817	First elected in 1812. Lost re-election to Walter Folger Jr.
John Reed Jr.	Federalist	9th	March 4, 1821 – March 4, 1823	Again elected in 1820. Retired.
John Reed Jr.	Federalist	13th	March 4, 1823 – March 4, 1825	Again elected in 1820. Retired.
John Reed Jr.	Anti-Jacksonian	13th	March 4, 1825 – March 4, 1833	Again elected in 1820. Retired.
John Reed Jr.	Anti-Jacksonian	11th	March 4, 1833 – March 4, 1835	Again elected in 1820. Retired.
John Reed Jr.	Anti-Masonic	11th	March 4, 1835 – March 4, 1837	Again elected in 1820. Retired.
John Reed Jr.	Whig	11th	March 4, 1837 – March 4, 1841	Again elected in 1820. Retired.
Alexander H. Rice	Republican	4th	March 4, 1861 – March 4, 1863	First elected in 1860. Retired.
Alexander H. Rice	Republican	3rd	March 4, 1863 – March 4, 1867	First elected in 1860. Retired.
Thomas Rice	Federalist	18th	March 4, 1815 – March 3, 1819	First elected in 1814. Lost re-election to James Parker.
William W. Rice	Republican	9th	March 4, 1877 – March 4, 1883	First elected in 1876. Lost re-election to Theodore Lyman.
William W. Rice	Republican	10th	March 4, 1883 – March 4, 1887	First elected in 1876. Lost re-election to Theodore Lyman.
Joseph Richardson	Anti-Jacksonian	11th	March 4, 1827 – March 4, 1831	First elected in 1826. [data missing]
William M. Richardson	Democratic-Republican	4th	November 4, 1811 – April 18, 1814	First elected to finish Joseph Varnum's term. Resigned to become U.S. Attorney.
Ernest W. Roberts	Republican	7th	March 4, 1899 – March 4, 1913	First elected in 1898. [data missing]
Ernest W. Roberts	Republican	9th	March 4, 1913 – March 4, 1917	First elected in 1898. [data missing]
George D. Robinson	Republican	11th	March 4, 1877 – March 4, 1883	First elected in 1876. Resigned to become Governor of Massachusetts.
George D. Robinson	Republican	12th	March 4, 1883 – January 7, 1884	First elected in 1876. Resigned to become Governor of Massachusetts.
Francis W. Rockwell	Republican	12th	January 17, 1884 – March 4, 1891	First elected to finish George D. Robinson's term Lost re-election to John C. Crosby.
Julius Rockwell	Whig	7th	March 4, 1843 – March 4, 1851	First elected in 1842. Retired.
John Jacob Rogers	Republican	5th	March 4, 1913 – March 28, 1925	First elected in 1912. Died.
Edith Nourse Rogers	Republican	5th	June 30, 1925 – September 10, 1960	[data missing] Died.
Nathaniel Ruggles	Federalist	13th	March 4, 1813 – March 4, 1819	First elected in 1812. [data missing]
John E. Russell	Democratic	10th	March 4, 1887 – March 4, 1889	First elected in 1886. [data missing]
Jonathan Russell	Democratic-Republican	11th	March 4, 1821 – March 4, 1823	First elected in 1820. [data missing]
Richard M. Russell	Democratic	9th	January 3, 1935 – January 3, 1937	First elected in 1934. [data missing]
William A. Russell	Republican	7th	March 4, 1879 – March 4, 1883	First elected in 1878. [data missing]
William A. Russell	Republican	8th	March 4, 1883 – March 4, 1885	First elected in 1878. [data missing]
Lorenzo Sabine	Whig	4th	December 13, 1852 – March 4, 1853	First elected to finish Benjamin Thompson's term. Retired.
Leverett Saltonstall I	Whig	2nd	December 5, 1838 – March 3, 1843	First elected to finish Stephen C. Phillips's term. Lost re-election to Daniel P. King.
Zabdiel Sampson	Democratic-Republican	8th	March 4, 1817 – July 26, 1820	First elected in 1816. Resigned to become Collector of Customs in Plymouth.
Zeno Scudder	Whig	10th	March 4, 1851 – March 4, 1853	First elected in 1850. [data missing]
Zeno Scudder	Whig	1st	March 4, 1853 – March 4, 1854	[data missing] Retired because of injury.
Ebenezer Seaver	Democratic-Republican	13th	March 4, 1803 – March 4, 1813	First elected in 1802. [data missing]
Theodore Sedgwick	Pro-Administration	4th	March 4, 1789 – March 3, 1793	First elected in 1788. Resigned.
Theodore Sedgwick	Pro-Administration	2nd	March 4, 1793 – March 3, 1795	First elected in 1788. Resigned.
Theodore Sedgwick	Federalist	1st	March 4, 1795 – June, 1796	First elected in 1788. Resigned.
Theodore Sedgwick	Federalist	1st	March 4, 1799 – March 3, 1801	Again elected in 1798. Retired.
Julius H. Seelye	Independent	10th	March 4, 1875 – March 4, 1877	First elected in 1874. [data missing]
Samuel Sewall	Federalist	10th	December 7, 1796 – January 10, 1800	First elected to finish Benjamin Goodhue's term. Resigned.
James Shannon	Democratic	5th	January 3, 1979 – January 3, 1985	First elected in 1978. Retired to run for U.S. Senate.
Henry Shaw	Democratic-Republican	7th	March 4, 1817 – March 4, 1821	First elected in 1816. [data missing]
William Shepard	Federalist	2nd	March 4, 1797 – March 4, 1803	First elected in 1796. [data missing]
Jonas Sibley	Democratic-Republican	5th	March 4, 1823 – March 3, 1825	First elected in 1823. Lost re-election to John Davis.
Nathaniel Silsbee	Democratic-Republican	2nd	March 4, 1817 – March 3, 1821	First elected in 1816. Retired.
John Simpkins	Republican	13th	March 4, 1895 – March 27, 1898	First elected in 1894. Died.
Thomson J. Skinner	Democratic-Republican	1st	March 4, 1797 – March 3, 1799	First elected in 1796. Retired.
Thomson J. Skinner	Democratic-Republican	12th	March 4, 1803 – August 10, 1804	[data missing] Resigned.
Josiah Smith	Democratic-Republican	6th	March 4, 1801 – March 4, 1803	First elected in 1800. Retired.
Charles F. Sprague	Republican	11th	March 4, 1897 – March 4, 1901	First elected in 1896. [data missing]
Asahel Stearns	Federalist	4th	March 4, 1815 – March 4, 1817	First elected in 1814. [data missing]
William Stedman	Federalist	11th	March 4, 1803 – July 16, 1810	First elected in 1802. [data missing]
Moses T. Stephens	Democratic	8th	March 4, 1891 – March 3, 1893	First elected in 1890. [data missing]
Moses T. Stephens	Democratic	5th	March 4, 1893 – March 3, 1895	First elected in 1890. [data missing]
Charles A. Stevens	Republican	10th	January 27, 1875 – March 3, 1875	First elected to finish Alvah Crocker's term. [data missing]
George R. Stobbs	Republican	4th	March 4, 1925 – March 4, 1931	First elected in 1924. Retired.
Eben F. Stone	Republican	6th	March 4, 1881 – March 4, 1883	First elected in 1880. Retired.
Eben F. Stone	Republican	7th	March 4, 1883 – March 4, 1887	First elected in 1880. Retired.
Joseph Story	Democratic-Republican	2nd	May 23, 1808 – March 3, 1809	First elected to finish Jacob Crowninshield's term. Retired.
Solomon Strong	Federalist	12th	March 4, 1815 – March 4, 1819	First elected in 1814. Retired.
Gerry Studds	Democratic	12th	January 3, 1973 – January 3, 1983	First elected in 1972. Retired.
Gerry Studds	Democratic	10th	January 3, 1983 – January 3, 1997	First elected in 1972. Retired.
John Andrew Sullivan	Democratic	11th	March 4, 1903 – March 4, 1907	First elected in 1902. [data missing]
Samuel Taggart	Federalist	6th	March 4, 1803 – March 4, 1817	First elected in 1802. Retired.
Peter Francis Tague	Democratic	10th	March 4, 1915 – March 4, 1919	First elected in 1914. Lost re-election to John F. Fitzgerald.
Peter Francis Tague	Democratic	10th	October 23, 1919 – March 3, 1925	Won election contest against John F. Fitzgerald. Lost re-election to John J. Douglass.
Peleg Tallman	Democratic-Republican	16th	March 4, 1811 – March 4, 1813	First elected in 1810. Retired.
John K. Tarbox	Democratic	7th	March 4, 1875 – March 4, 1877	First elected in 1874. [data missing]
Thomas Chandler Thacher	Democratic	16th	March 4, 1913 – March 4, 1915	First elected in 1912. Lost re-election to Joseph Walsh.
George Thatcher	Pro-Administration	6th	March 4, 1789 – March 4, 1791	First elected in 1788. Retired.
George Thatcher	Pro-Administration	8th	March 4, 1791 – March 4, 1793	First elected in 1788. Retired.
George Thatcher	Pro-Administration	4th	March 4, 1793 – March 4, 1795	First elected in 1788. Retired.
George Thatcher	Federalist	14th	March 4, 1795 – March 4, 1801	First elected in 1788. Retired.
Samuel Thatcher	Federalist	12th	December 6, 1802 – March 4, 1803	First elected to finish Silas Lee's term. Lost re-election to Orchard Cook.
Samuel Thatcher	Federalist	16th	March 4, 1803 – March 4, 1805	First elected to finish Silas Lee's term. Lost re-election to Orchard Cook.
Eli Thayer	Republican	9th	March 4, 1857 – March 4, 1861	First elected in 1856. [data missing]
Harry I. Thayer	Republican	8th	March 4, 1925 – March 10, 1926	First elected in 1924. Died.
John A. Thayer	Democratic	3rd	March 4, 1911 – March 3, 1913	First elected in 1910. Lost re-election to William Wilder.
John R. Thayer	Democratic	3rd	March 4, 1899 – March 3, 1905	First elected in 1898. Retired.
Benjamin Thomas	Union	3rd	June 11, 1861 – March 3, 1863	First elected to finish Charles F. Adams's term. [data missing]
Benjamin Thompson	Whig	4th	March 4, 1845 – March 3, 1847	First elected in 1844. Retired.
Benjamin Thompson	Whig	4th	March 4, 1851 – September 24, 1852	Again elected in 1850. Died.
Charles P. Thompson	Democratic	6th	March 4, 1875 – March 7, 1877	First elected in 1874. Lost re-election to George B. Loring.
John F. Tierney	Democratic	6th	January 3, 1997 – January 3, 2015	First elected in 1996. Lost renomination to Seth Moulton.
George H. Tinkham	Republican	11th	March 4, 1915 – March 3, 1933	First elected in 1914. [data missing]
George H. Tinkham	Republican	10th	March 4, 1933 – January 3, 1943	First elected in 1914. [data missing]
Charles Q. Tirrell	Republican	4th	March 4, 1901 – July 31, 1910	First elected in 1900. Died.
Peter Torkildsen	Republican	6th	January 3, 1993 – January 3, 1997	First elected in 1992. Lost re-election to John F. Tierney.
Mark Trafton	Know Nothing	11th	March 4, 1855 – March 4, 1857	First elected in 1854. [data missing]
Lori Trahan	Democratic	3rd	January 3, 2019 – present	First elected in 2018. Incumbent
Charles R. Train	Republican	8th	March 4, 1859 – March 4, 1863	First elected in 1858. [data missing]
Allen T. Treadway	Republican	1st	March 4, 1913 – January 3, 1945	First elected in 1912. Retired.
Niki Tsongas	Democratic	5th	October 18, 2007 – January 3, 2013	First elected to finish Marty Meehan's term.
Niki Tsongas	Democratic	3rd	January 3, 2013 – January 3, 2019.	First elected to finish Marty Meehan's term.
Paul Tsongas	Democratic	5th	January 3, 1975 – January 3, 1979	First elected in 1974. Retired to run for U.S. Senate.
Charles Turner Jr.	Democratic-Republican	7th	June 28, 1809 – March 4, 1813	Successfully challenged election of William Baylies. Lost re-election.
Ginery Twichell	Republican	3rd	March 4, 1867 – March 3, 1873	First elected in 1866. Retired.
Charles L. Underhill	Republican	9th	March 4, 1921 – March 3, 1933	First elected in 1920. Retired.
Charles W. Upham	Whig	6th	March 4, 1853 – March 3, 1855	First elected in 1852. Lost re-election to Timothy Davis.
Jabez Upham	Federalist	10th	March 4, 1807 – 1810	First elected in 1806. Resigned.
John Varnum	Anti-Jacksonian	3rd	March 4, 1825 – March 3, 1831	First elected in 1825. [data missing]
Joseph Bradley Varnum	Democratic-Republican	9th	March 4, 1795 – March 3, 1803	First elected in 1794. Resigned when elected U.S. senator.
Joseph Bradley Varnum	Democratic-Republican	4th	March 4, 1803 – June 29, 1811	First elected in 1794. Resigned when elected U.S. senator.
Peleg Wadsworth	Pro-Administration	4th	March 4, 1793 – March 3, 1795	First elected in 1792. Retired.
Peleg Wadsworth	Federalist	13th	March 4, 1795 – March 3, 1803	First elected in 1792. Retired.
Peleg Wadsworth	Federalist	15th	March 4, 1803 – March 3, 1807	First elected in 1792. Retired.
Amasa Walker	Republican	9th	December 1, 1862 – March 3, 1863	First elected to finish Goldsmith F. Bailey's term. Retired.
Joseph H. Walker	Republican	10th	March 4, 1889 – March 3, 1893	First elected in 1888. [data missing]
Joseph H. Walker	Republican	3rd	March 4, 1893 – March 3, 1899	First elected in 1888. [data missing]
Rodney Wallace	Republican	11th	March 4, 1889 – March 4, 1891	First elected in 1888. [data missing]
Samuel H. Walley	Whig	4th	March 4, 1853 – March 4, 1855	First elected in 1852. Lost re-election to Linus B. Comins.
Joseph Walsh	Republican	16th	March 4, 1915 – August 21, 1922	First elected in 1914. Resigned to become justice on the Massachusetts Superior Court.
Artemas Ward	Pro-Administration	7th	March 4, 1791 – March 3, 1793	First elected in 1790. [data missing]
Artemas Ward	Pro-Administration	2nd	March 4, 1793 – March 3, 1795	First elected in 1790. [data missing]
Artemas Ward Jr.	Federalist	1st	March 4, 1813 – March 3, 1817	First elected in 1812. Retired.
William W. Warren	Democratic	8th	March 4, 1875 – March 4, 1877	First elected in 1874. [data missing]
Charles G. Washburn	Republican	3rd	December 18, 1906 – March 3, 1911	First elected to finish Rockwood Hoar's term. Lost re-election to John A. Thayer.
William B. Washburn	Republican	9th	March 4, 1863 – December 5, 1871	First elected in 1862. Resigned to become Governor of Massachusetts.
Daniel Webster	Federalist	1st	March 4, 1823 – March 3, 1825	First elected in 1822. Resigned to become U.S. senator.
Daniel Webster	Anti-Jacksonian	1st	March 4, 1825 – March 3, 1829	First elected in 1822. Resigned to become U.S. senator.
John W. Weeks	Republican	12th	March 4, 1905 – March 4, 1913	First elected in 1904. Resigned to become U.S. senator.
John W. Weeks	Republican	13th	March 4, 1913 – March 4, 1913	First elected in 1904. Resigned to become U.S. senator.
Tappan Wentworth	Whig	8th	March 4, 1853 – March 4, 1855	First elected in 1852. [data missing]
George W. Weymouth	Republican	4th	March 4, 1897 – March 4, 1901	First elected in 1896. Retired.
Laban Wheaton	Federalist	9th	March 4, 1809 – March 4, 1815	First elected in 1808. Lost re-election to Marcus Morton.
Laban Wheaton	Federalist	10th	March 4, 1815 – March 4, 1817	First elected in 1808. Lost re-election to Marcus Morton.
Leonard White	Federalist	3rd	March 4, 1811 – March 3, 1813	First elected in 1810. [data missing]
William Whiting	Republican	3rd	March 4, 1873 – June 29, 1873	First elected in 1872. Died.
William II Whiting	Republican	11th	March 4, 1883 – March 3, 1889	First elected in 1882. [data missing]
Ezekiel Whitman	Federalist	15th	March 4, 1809 – March 4, 1811	First elected in 1808. [data missing]
Ezekiel Whitman	Federalist	15th	March 4, 1817 – March 4, 1821	Again first elected in 1816. District moved to Maine.
William Widgery	Democratic-Republican	15th	March 4, 1811 – March 3, 1813	First elected in 1811. Lost re-election to George Bradbury.
Richard B. Wigglesworth	Republican	14th	November 6, 1928 – March 3, 1933	[data missing] Resigned to become U.S. Ambassador to Canada.
Richard B. Wigglesworth	Republican	13th	March 4, 1933 – November 13, 1958	[data missing] Resigned to become U.S. Ambassador to Canada.
William H. Wilder	Republican	4th	March 4, 1911 – March 4, 1913	First elected in 1910. Died.
William H. Wilder	Republican	3rd	March 4, 1913 – September 11, 1913	First elected in 1910. Died.
George F. Williams	Democratic	9th	March 4, 1891 – March 4, 1893	First elected in 1890. [data missing]
Henry Williams	Democratic	10th	March 4, 1839 – March 4, 1841	First elected in 1838. [data missing]
Henry Williams	Democratic	9th	March 4, 1843 – March 4, 1845	First elected in 1838. [data missing]
John M. S. Williams	Republican	8th	March 4, 1873 – March 4, 1875	First elected in 1872. [data missing]
Lemuel Williams	Federalist	5th	March 4, 1799 – March 3, 1803	First elected in 1798. [data missing]
Lemuel Williams	Federalist	8th	March 4, 1803 – March 3, 1805	First elected in 1798. [data missing]
John Wilson	Federalist	18th	March 4, 1813 – March 4, 1815	First elected in 1812. Lost renomination to Thomas Rice.
John Wilson	Federalist	17th	March 4, 1817 – March 4, 1819	First elected in 1816. Lost re-election to Martin Kinsley.
Samuel Winslow	Republican	4th	March 4, 1913 – March 3, 1925	First elected in 1912. Resigned.
Robert C. Winthrop	Whig	1st	November 9, 1840 – May 25, 1842	First elected to finish Abbott Lawrence's term. Resigned.
Robert C. Winthrop	Whig	1st	November 29, 1842 – July 30, 1850	Again elected to finish Nathan Appleton's term. Resigned to become U.S. senator.
Abiel Wood	Democratic-Republican	17th	March 4, 1813 – March 4, 1815	First elected in 1812. [data missing]
Ashley B. Wright	Republican	1st	March 4, 1893 – August 14, 1897	First elected in 1892. Died.
Member	Party	District	Years	Electoral history

== See also ==
- List of United States senators from Massachusetts
- Massachusetts's congressional delegations
- Massachusetts's congressional districts
