= Thomas Chandler Thacher =

American politician

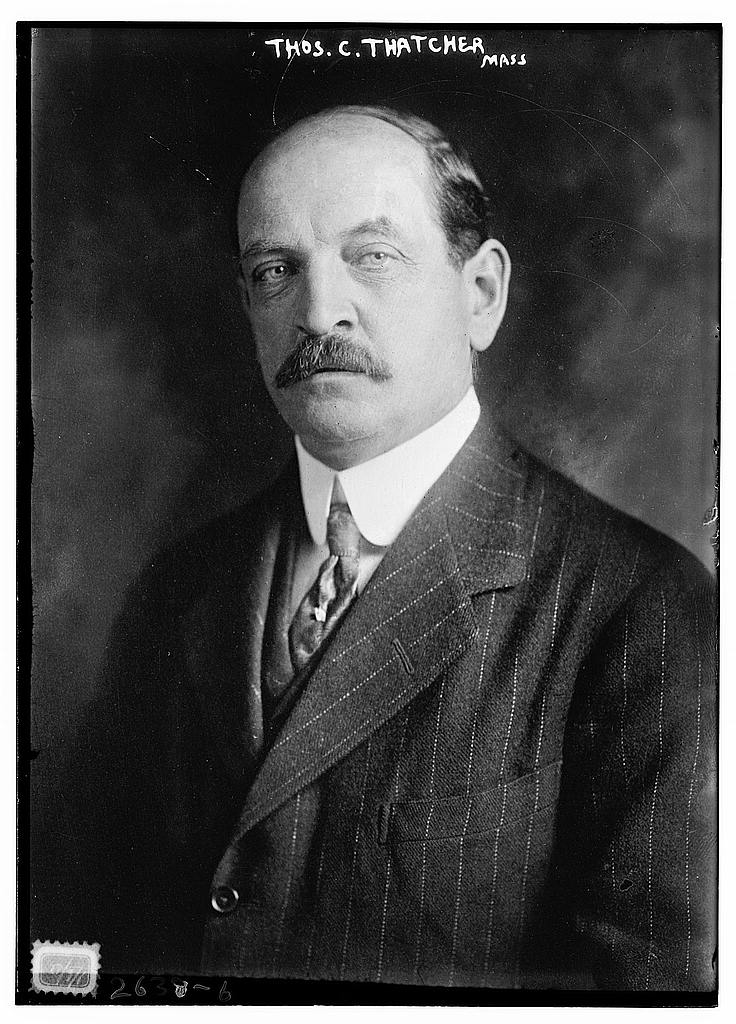

Member of the U.S. House of Representatives from Massachusetts's 16th district
- In office March 4, 1913 – March 3, 1915
- Preceded by: District reissued in 1913
- Succeeded by: Joseph Walsh

Personal details
- Born: July 20, 1858 Yarmouth Port, Massachusetts, U.S.
- Died: April 11, 1945 (aged 86) Boston, Massachusetts, U.S.
- Party: Democratic
- Education: Harvard University

Thomas Chandler Thacher (July 20, 1858 – April 11, 1945) was a U.S. representative from Massachusetts.

== Biography ==
Born in Yarmouth Port, Massachusetts, Thacher attended the public schools. He was graduated from Adams Academy, Quincy, Massachusetts, in 1878 and from Harvard University in 1882. He became engaged in the wool business at Boston in 1882. He served as president of the Barnstable County Agricultural Society. He served as president of the Cape Cod Pilgrim Memorial Association. He served as chairman of the Yarmouth Port Planning Board. He served as chairman of the Provincetown Tercentenary Commission in 1920.

Thacher was elected as a Democrat to the 63rd Congress (March 4, 1913 – March 3, 1915). He was an unsuccessful candidate for reelection in 1914. After his service in Congress, he became a writer on business topics and also engaged in his former business pursuits. He died in Boston, Massachusetts, April 11, 1945. He was interred in Woodside Cemetery, Yarmouth Port, Massachusetts.

U.S. House of Representatives
| Preceded by District re-established | Member of the U.S. House of Representatives from Massachusetts's 16th congressional district 1913-1915 | Succeeded by Joseph Walsh |
