= Rockwood Hoar =

American politician

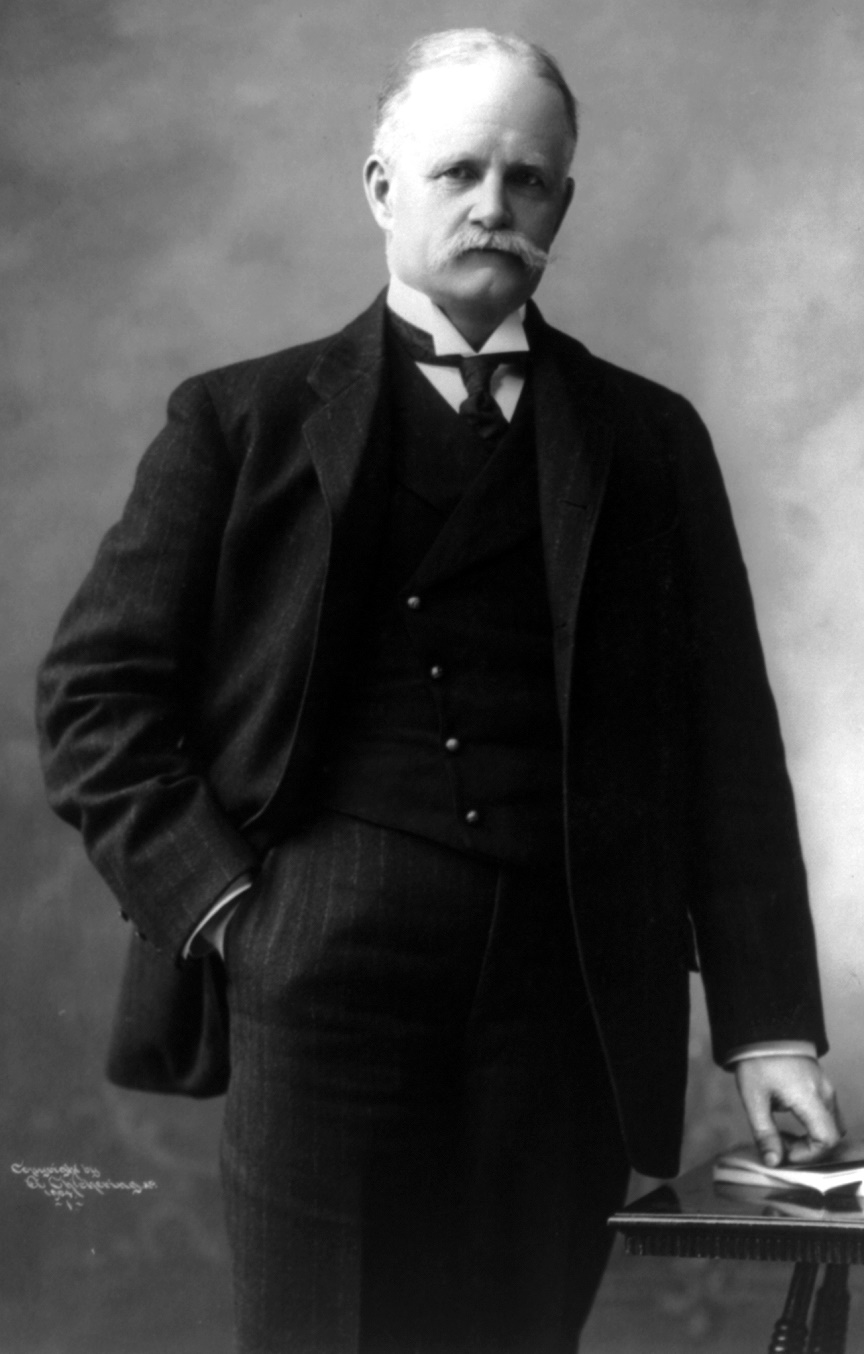

Member of the U.S. House of Representatives from Massachusetts's 3rd district
- In office March 4, 1905 – November 1, 1906
- Preceded by: John R. Thayer
- Succeeded by: Charles G. Washburn

District attorney of Worcester County, Massachusetts
- In office 1899–1905
- Preceded by: Herbert Parker
- Succeeded by: George S. Taft

Personal details
- Born: August 24, 1855 Worcester, Massachusetts, U.S.
- Died: November 1, 1906 (aged 51) Worcester, Massachusetts, U.S.
- Party: Republican
- Education: Harvard University
- Profession: Lawyer

Military service
- Allegiance: United States of America
- Branch/service: United States Army
- Years of service: 1875–1879

Rockwood Hoar (August 24, 1855 – November 1, 1906) was a representative from Massachusetts, the son of Massachusetts U.S. Senator George Frisbie Hoar.

== Life and career ==
Hoar was born in Worcester, Massachusetts, and graduated from Harvard University in 1876. He was a member of Company C, Fifth Massachusetts Infantry, from 1875 to 1879, an assistant to the district attorney for the middle district Worcester County, Massachusetts from 1884 to 1887, a member of the common council of Worcester from 1887 to 1891, and aide-de-camp with the rank of colonel on the staff of Governor Oliver Ames from 1887 to 1890. He served as judge advocate general with the rank of brigadier general on the staff of Governor Roger Wolcott from 1897 to 1900.

He was the district attorney of Worcester County from 1899 to 1905. He was elected to the 59th Congress in 1904, serving from 1905 to 1906. He was also a board trustee of Clark University, a board trustee of the Worcester Insane Hospital, and board director of the Washburn and Moen Manufacturing Company. Hoar was elected a member of the American Antiquarian Society in 1894.

Hoar died in Worcester after an illness of about five weeks and is buried in the Rural Cemetery there. Since his death occurred five days before the next election, the Third Congressional Republican District Committee, which was in session at the time of his death, nominated Charles G. Washburn to fill the vacancy, and he won the seat.

He married Christine Rice in 1893; she was the daughter of Worcester manufacturer William E. Rice. They had two daughters, Frances Helen and Louisa Ruth. In addition to being Senator George Frisbie Hoar's son, he was the nephew of U.S. Attorney General and Massachusetts Supreme Court Justice Ebenezer Rockwood Hoar and cousin of Sherman Hoar. Rockwood Hoar was also the grandson of U.S. Congressman Samuel Hoar and the great-grandson of Roger Sherman.

== See also ==
- List of members of the United States Congress who died in office (1900–1949)

U.S. House of Representatives
Preceded by John R. Thayer	Member of the U.S. House of Representatives from Massachusetts's 3rd congressional district March 4, 1905 – November 1, 1906	Succeeded by Charles G. Washburn
