= John W. Candler =

American politician (1828–1903)

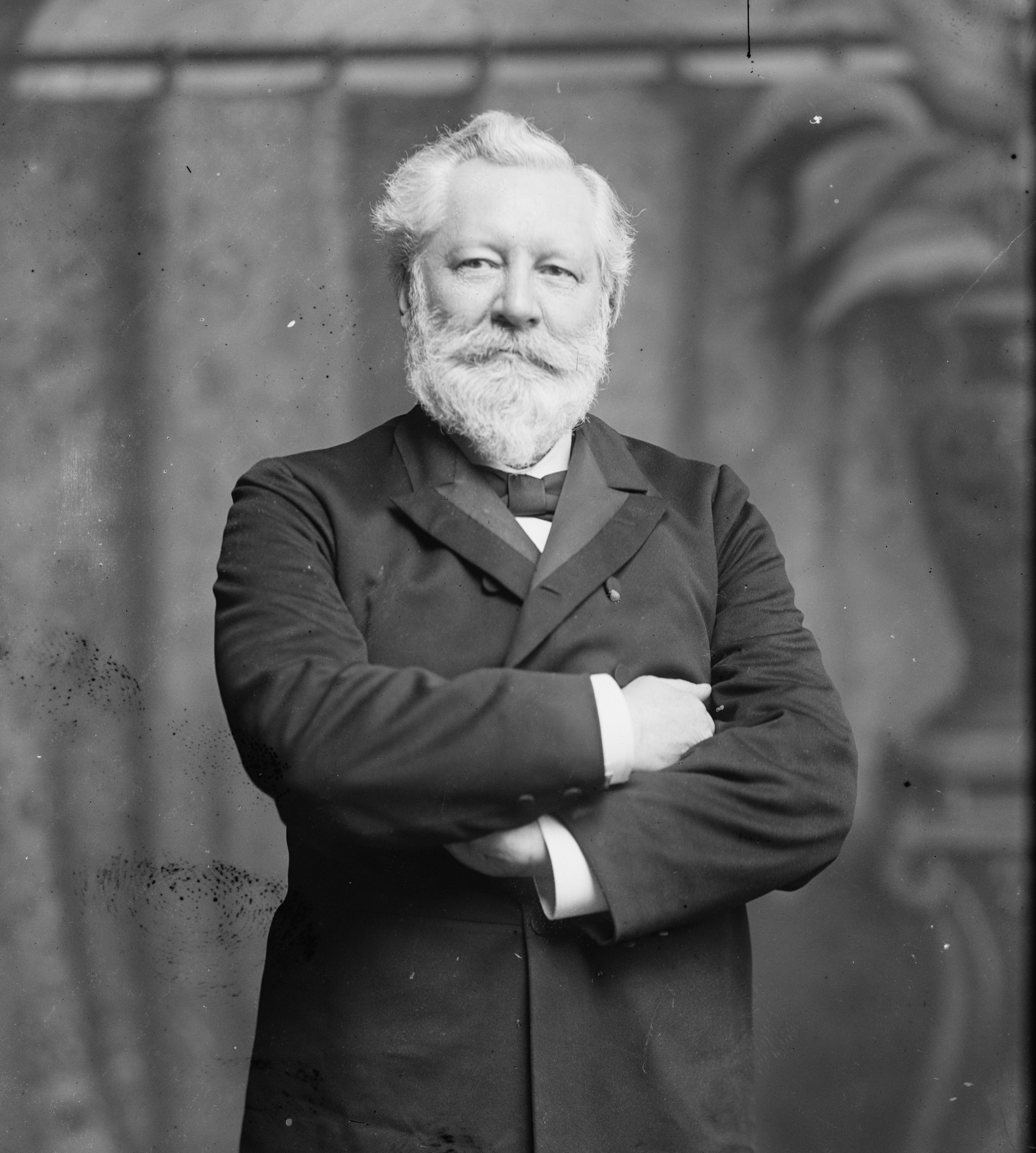
- Candler in 1895

Member of the U.S. House of Representatives from Massachusetts
- In office March 4, 1881 – March 3, 1883
- Preceded by: William Claflin
- Succeeded by: William A. Russell
- Constituency: 8th district
- In office March 4, 1889 – March 3, 1891
- Preceded by: Edward Burnett
- Succeeded by: George F. Williams
- Constituency: 9th district

Member of the Massachusetts House of Representatives
- In office 1866–1866

Personal details
- Born: John Wilson Candler; February 10, 1828 Boston, Massachusetts
- Died: March 16, 1903 (aged 75) Providence, Rhode Island
- Resting place: Mount Auburn Cemetery
- Party: Republican

John Wilson Candler (February 10, 1828 – March 16, 1903) was an American merchant, businessman, and politician who served two nonconsecutive terms as a United States representative from Massachusetts in the late 19th century.

== Biography ==
Candler was born in Boston on February 10, 1828. He attended the Marblehead and Dummer Academies.

=== Early career ===
He then became a merchant, engaged in shipping and commerce with the East and West Indies and South America. He served as a member of the Massachusetts House of Representatives. He was chairman of the commissioners of prisons of Massachusetts, and president of the Boston Board of Trade and of the Commercial Club of Boston.

=== Family ===
Candler married Lucy Almira Cobb on September 1, 1851 in Boston. Cobb was the daughter of Henry and Augusta Adams Cobb. Her mother Augusta, however, had converted to Mormonism in 1832 and abandoned the family in 1843 to marry Brigham Young as his second polygamous wife. After bearing three daughters, Lucy Cobb Candler died in 1855 and John Wilson Candler then married Ida May Garrison of Manhattan in 1867, and they had one daughter.

=== Congress ===
Candler was elected as a Republican to the Forty-seventh Congress (March 4, 1881 – March 3, 1883). He was an unsuccessful candidate for reelection in 1882 to the Forty-eighth Congress, but was elected to the Fifty-first Congress (March 4, 1889 – March 3, 1891). He again was an unsuccessful candidate for reelection in 1890 to the Fifty-second Congress.

=== Later career and death ===
He returned to engage in mercantile pursuits until his retirement in 1893.

He died in Providence, Rhode Island on March 16, 1903. His interment was in Mount Auburn Cemetery in Cambridge, Massachusetts.

U.S. House of Representatives
Preceded by William Claflin	Member of the U.S. House of Representatives from Massachusetts's 8th congressional district 1881–1883	Succeeded by William A. Russell
Preceded by Edward Burnett	Member of the U.S. House of Representatives from Massachusetts's 9th congressional district 1889–1891	Succeeded by George F. Williams
