= John Varnum =

American politician

Member of the U.S. House of Representatives from Massachusetts's 3rd district
- In office March 4, 1825 – March 3, 1831
- Preceded by: Jeremiah Nelson
- Succeeded by: Jeremiah Nelson

Member of the Massachusetts House of Representatives

Personal details
- Born: June 25, 1778 Dracut, Massachusetts, U.S.
- Died: July 23, 1836 (aged 58) Niles, Michigan Territory, U.S.
- Party: National Republican
- Education: Harvard University

John Varnum (June 25, 1778 – July 23, 1836) was a United States representative from Massachusetts. He was born in Dracut on June 25, 1778. He graduated from Harvard University in 1798, studied law, was admitted to the bar and commenced practice in Haverhill. Varnum was elected as a Federalist to the Massachusetts State Senate. He moved to Lowell. Varnum was elected to the Nineteenth, Twentieth, and Twenty-first Congresses (March 4, 1825 – March 3, 1831) and later moved to Niles in the Michigan Territory where he died July 23, 1836. His interment was in Silverbrook Cemetery.

== Personal life ==
Varnum was the son of Parker Varnum (1747–1824) and his wife, Dorcas Brown Varnum (1754–1800). He was a second cousin, once removed of Joseph Bradley Varnum and James Mitchell Varnum. He married his first wife, Mary Cooke Saltonstall (1781–1817) on October 9, 1806, in Haverhill, Massachusetts. She was the older sister of Leverett Saltonstall I and member of the Saltonstall family. He married secondly, on May 23, 1826, in Washington, D.C., Mary (née Pease) Varnum, widow of James Mitchell Varnum II, his second cousin(and son of Joseph B. Varnum). She was the niece of Calvin Pease and Gideon Granger.

Varnum also shares a common ancestor, John Prescott (abt. 1604-abt. 1682) with President George H. W. Bush, his son, President George W. Bush, Vice Presidents Charles W. Fairbanks and Garret Hobart, First Lady Abigail Fillmore, and poet Robert Frost.

U.S. House of Representatives
Preceded by Jeremiah Nelson	Member of the U.S. House of Representatives from Massachusetts's 3rd congressional district March 4, 1825 – March 3, 1831	Succeeded by Jeremiah Nelson
