= Peleg Tallman =

American politician

Member of the U.S. House of Representatives from Massachusetts's 16th district
- In office March 4, 1811 – March 3, 1813
- Preceded by: Orchard Cook
- Succeeded by: Samuel Davis

Personal details
- Born: July 24, 1764 Tiverton, Rhode Island Colony, British America
- Died: March 12, 1840 (aged 75) Bath, Maine, U.S.
- Party: Democratic-Republican
- Occupation: Merchant

Peleg Tallman (July 24, 1764 – March 12, 1840) was a United States representative from Massachusetts. He was born in Tiverton in the Rhode Island Colony and attended public schools. He served in the Revolutionary War on the privateer Trumbull, and lost an arm in an engagement in 1780. He was captured and imprisoned by the British. After the War, he engaged in mercantile pursuits in Bath (which was a part of Massachusetts' District of Maine until 1820).

He was elected as a Democratic-Republican to the Twelfth Congress (March 4, 1811 – March 3, 1813). He declined to be a candidate for renomination, and became an overseer of Bowdoin College 1802-1840. Tallman served as a member of the Maine State Senate, and died in Bath. His interment was in Maple Grove Cemetery, and was reinterred in Forest Hills Cemetery, Roxbury, Massachusetts.

U.S. House of Representatives
Preceded by Orchard Cook	Member of the U.S. House of Representatives from Massachusetts's 16th congressional district 1811-1813	Succeeded by Samuel Davis
