= Jeremiah Nelson =

American politician

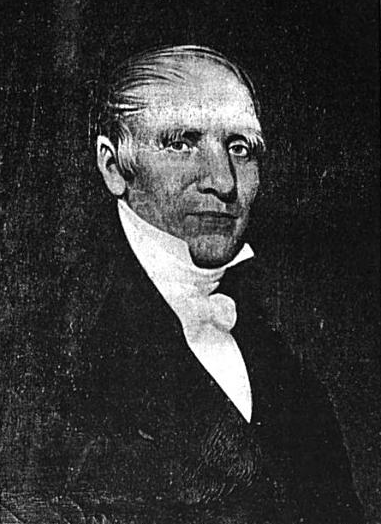

Member of the U.S. House of Representatives from Massachusetts's 3rd district
- In office March 4, 1831 – March 3, 1833
- Preceded by: John Varnum
- Succeeded by: Gayton P. Osgood
- In office March 4, 1815 – March 3, 1825
- Preceded by: Timothy Pickering
- Succeeded by: John Varnum
- In office March 4, 1805 – March 3, 1807
- Preceded by: Manasseh Cutler
- Succeeded by: Edward St. Loe Livermore

Chairman of the Board of Selectmen of the Town of Newburyport, Massachusetts
- In office 1811–1812

Member of the Board of Selectmen of the Town of Newburyport, Massachusetts
- In office March 15, 1809 – March 18, 1812

Member of the Massachusetts House of Representatives
- In office 1804–1805

Personal details
- Born: September 14, 1769 Rowley, Province of Massachusetts Bay, British America
- Died: October 2, 1838 (aged 69) Newburyport, Massachusetts, U.S.
- Resting place: Oak Hill Cemetery
- Party: Federalist; Republican
- Spouse: Mary Balch
- Children: Mary Balch Nelson, b. May 29, 1832, d. June 27, 1887; Elizabeth Mighill Nelson, b. February 8, 1834, d. June 14, 1851; Jeremiah Nelson, b. January 12, 1836; John B.Nelson, b. January 3, 1839.
- Education: Dartmouth

Jeremiah Nelson (September 14, 1769 – October 2, 1838) was a Representative from Massachusetts.

Nelson was born in Rowley in the Province of Massachusetts Bay on September 14, 1769, to Solomon and Elizabeth (Mighill) Nelson. He graduated from Dartmouth College, Hanover, New Hampshire, in 1790. He engaged in the mercantile business in Newburyport, Massachusetts.

He was a member of the general court of Massachusetts in 1803 and 1804, was elected as a Federalist to the Ninth Congress (March 4, 1805 – March 3, 1807); he was not a candidate for renomination in 1806 to the Tenth Congress. In 1811, he served as chairman of the board of selectmen of Newburyport. He was again elected to the Congress and to the four succeeding Congresses, serving from (March 4, 1815 – March 3, 1825). During the (Seventeenth and Eighteenth Congresses) he was chairman of the Committee on Expenditures on Public Buildings. He was not a candidate for renomination in 1824 to the Nineteenth Congress.

He served as president of the Newburyport Mutual Fire Co. in 1829. He returned to Congress as an Anti-Jacksonian for the Twenty-second Congress (March 4, 1831 – March 3, 1833). He declined to be a candidate for renomination in 1832. After leaving politics, he engaged in the shipping business. Nelson died in Newburyport, Massachusetts, October 2, 1838, and was interred in Oak Hill Cemetery.

U.S. House of Representatives
Preceded by Manasseh Cutler	Member of the U.S. House of Representatives from Massachusetts's 3rd congressional district March 4, 1805 – March 3, 1807	Succeeded by Edward St. Loe Livermore
Preceded by Timothy Pickering	Member of the U.S. House of Representatives from Massachusetts's 3rd congressional district March 4, 1815 – March 3, 1825	Succeeded by John Varnum
Preceded by John Varnum	Member of the U.S. House of Representatives from Massachusetts's 3rd congressional district March 4, 1831 – March 3, 1833	Succeeded by Gayton P. Osgood
Political offices
Preceded by	Member of the Board of Selectmen of the Town of Newburyport, Massachusetts; March 15, 1809 - March 18, 1812	Succeeded by
Preceded by	Chairman of the Board of Selectmen of the Town of Newburyport, Massachusetts; 1811-1811	Succeeded by
Preceded by	Member of the Massachusetts House of Representatives; 1804-1805	Succeeded by
