= Tavern Club (Boston, Massachusetts) =

Private social club

Coordinates: 42.3519°N 71.0662°W

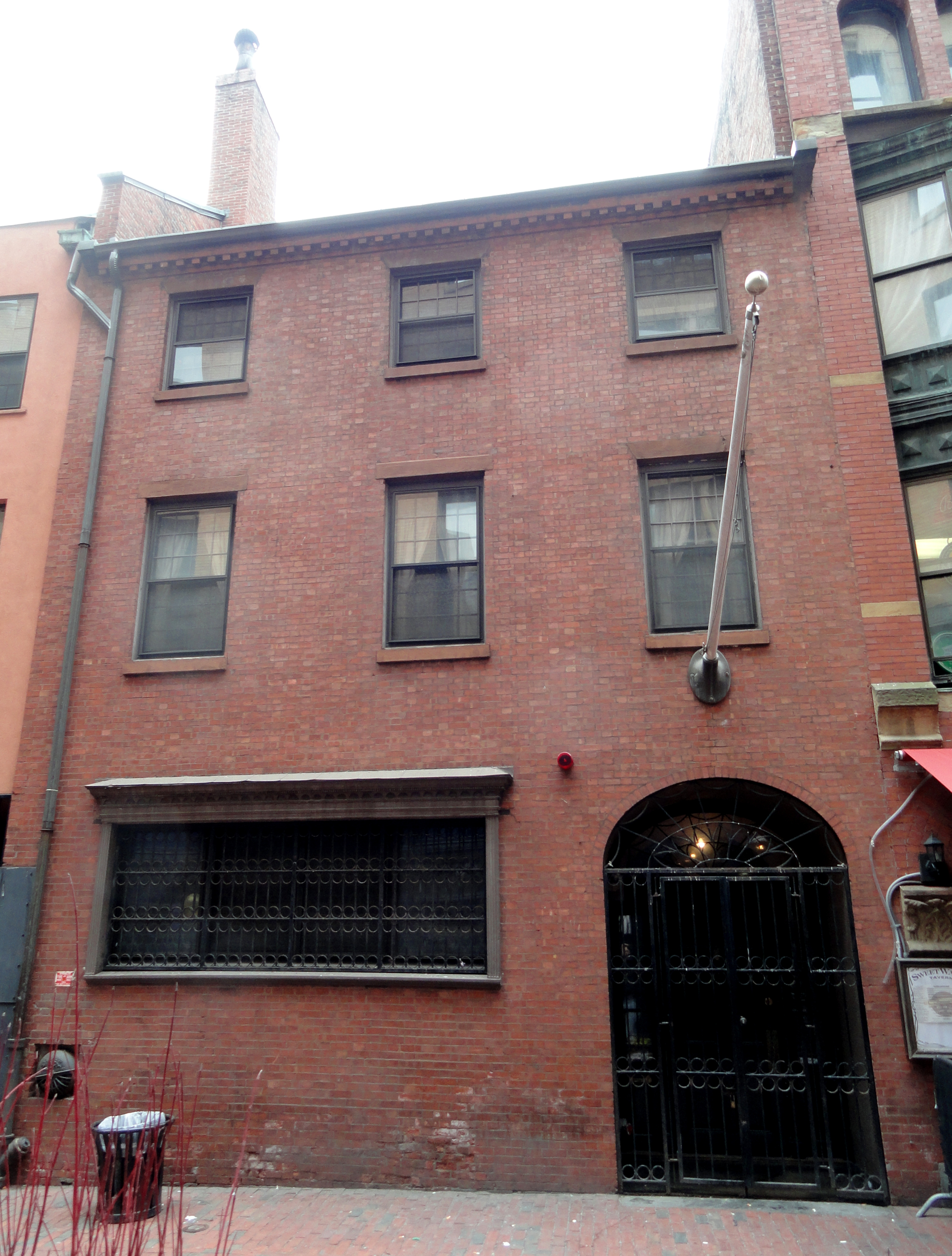
- Formation: 1884
- Founder: Royal Whitman, Timothee Adamowski, B. C. Porter, George Munzig, Frederick Prince
- Type: Private social club
- Headquarters: 4 Boylston Place, Boston, Massachusetts, United States

The Tavern Club, 4 Boylston Place in downtown Boston, Massachusetts, is a private social club established in 1884.

Under the classification 501(c)(7) "Social and Recreation Clubs" it has EIN 04-1893630; in 2025 it reported $842,406 in total revenue and $2,791,990 in total assets.

== Brief history ==
The Tavern Club was founded in 1884 by Royal Whitman, Timothee Adamowski, B. C. Porter, Edward Burnett, George Munzig, and Frederick Prince. Charter members included Arthur Rotch and others. Membership is by invitation; in recent years membership includes women. Notable members of the club have included William Dean Howells, Henry Cabot Lodge, Henry James, and Charles Eliot Norton.

In February, 1885, the club adopted the Totem of Bear, which continues today as mascot for the group.

Frequent dinners, lectures, and musical and theatrical performances take place in the club for the members and their guests. In March 1885, Mark Twain attended a dinner in his honor, and another in 1901. Dinners have been given in honor of many others, including Elihu Vedder (1887), Rudyard Kipling (1895), Oliver Wendell Holmes (1902), John Singer Sargent (1903), Booker T. Washington (1905), Winston Churchill (1907), Norman Angell (1913), George Macaulay Trevelyan (1924), Owen Wister (1929), Ignace Paderewski (1930).

A pervasive sense of humor and occasion characterizes many club activities. In 1903, the club won the baseball Challenge Cup against rival St. Botolph Club. The 1907 Annual Meeting treated the Members to a Puppy Raffle. Also in 1907 Taverners in 16th century German costume participated in the Copley Society's artists festival, along with other local groups.

== Some notable members ==
Notable members have included:

- Timothee Adamowski
- Winthrop Ames
- George Pierce Baker
- Arlo Bates
- Frank Weston Benson
- Henry Forbes Bigelow
- William Sturgis Bigelow
- Henry Pickering Bowditch
- Edward Burnett
- Frederick Shepherd Converse
- Harvey Cushing
- Francis Hatch
- Augustus Hemenway
- Henry Lee Higginson
- Adams Sherman Hill
- Oliver Wendell Holmes Jr.
- Mark Antony DeWolfe Howe
- William Dean Howells
- Alexander Wadsworth Longfellow
- Guy Lowell
- George Howard Monks
- Charles Eliot Norton
- Bliss Perry
- Benjamin Curtis Porter
- Bela Lyon Pratt
- Arthur Rotch
- Frederic Jesup Stimson
- R. Clipston Sturgis
- Edmund Charles Tarbell
- Eliot Wadsworth
- Dennis Miller Bunker
- Langdon Warner
- Barrett Wendell

== See also ==
- List of American gentlemen's clubs
