= Frederick D. Ely =

American politician

Frederick David Ely
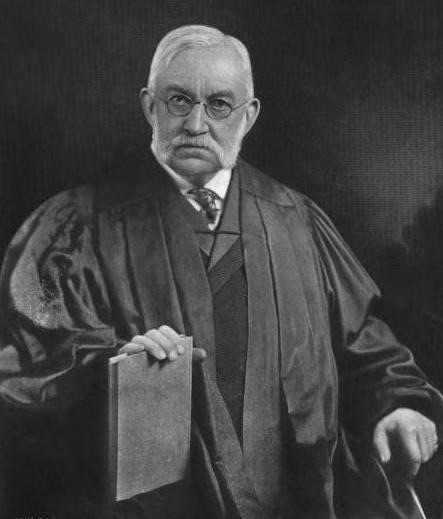
- Justice Ely in court dress

Member of the U.S. House of Representatives from Massachusetts's 9th district
- In office March 4, 1885 – March 3, 1887
- Preceded by: Theodore Lyman
- Succeeded by: Edward Burnett

Member of the Massachusetts Senate
- In office 1878–1879

Member of the Massachusetts House of Representatives
- In office 1873

Personal details
- Born: September 24, 1838 Wrentham, Massachusetts
- Died: August 6, 1921 (aged 82) Dedham, Massachusetts
- Resting place: Old Village Cemetery
- Party: Republican
- Spouses: Eliza Baldwin Whittier (m. 1866–1881) Anna Emerson (m. 1885)
- Education: Brown University

Frederick David Ely (September 24, 1838 – August 6, 1921) was a United States representative from Massachusetts.

== Biography ==
Frederick D. Ely was born in Wrentham, Massachusetts on September 24, 1838.

He attended Day’s Academy and graduated from Brown University in 1859. He studied law, was admitted to the bar and commenced practice at Dedham. He was a trial justice, was elected a member of the Massachusetts House of Representatives, and served in the Massachusetts State Senate. He was also a member of the Dedham school committee.

Ely was elected as a Republican to the Forty-ninth Congress (March 4, 1885 – March 3, 1887). He was an unsuccessful candidate for reelection in 1886 to the Fiftieth Congress and resumed the practice of law, and did serve as justice of the Municipal Court of Boston from 1888 to 1914.

He married Eliza Baldwin Whittier on December 6, 1866. She died on February 12, 1881, and he remarried to Anna Emerson on August 10, 1885.

He died at his home in Dedham on August 6, 1921, and was buried in Old Village Cemetery.

== See also ==
- 1873 Massachusetts legislature
- 1878 Massachusetts legislature

U.S. House of Representatives
Preceded by Theodore Lyman	Member of the U.S. House of Representatives from Massachusetts's 9th congressional district 1885–1887	Succeeded by Edward Burnett
