= Benjamin Brown (politician) =

American politician (1756–1831)

Member of the U.S. House of Representatives from Massachusetts's 16th district
- In office March 4, 1815 – March 3, 1817
- Preceded by: Samuel Davis
- Succeeded by: Benjamin Orr

Member of the Massachusetts House of Representatives
- In office 1809; 1811–1812; 1819

Personal details
- Born: September 23, 1756 Swansea, Province of Massachusetts Bay, British America
- Died: September 17, 1831 (aged 74) Waldoboro, Maine, U.S.
- Resting place: Waldoboro Cemetery; Waldoboro, Maine
- Party: Federalist
- Spouse: Susan Wells Brown
- Relations: John Brown
- Children: 3
- Profession: Physician; Politician

Military service
- Branch/service: United States Navy
- Years of service: 1778
- Rank: Surgeon
- Unit: "Boston"
- Battles/wars: American Revolutionary War

Benjamin Brown (September 23, 1756 – September 17, 1831) was a medical doctor and an American politician who served in the United States Congress as a United States representative from Massachusetts (Maine was a part of Massachusetts until 1820).

== Early life ==
Born in Swansea in the Province of Massachusetts Bay, Brown studied medicine and began his medical practice in Waldoboro, Lincoln County, District of Maine.

== Career ==
Brown served as a surgeon aboard the American frigate "Boston" in 1778 when John Adams traveled on the "Boston" while American commissioner to France. Along with Commander Tucker, he was captured in 1781 on the American warship Thorne; imprisoned on Prince Edward Island, and escaped in an open boat.

A member of the Massachusetts state house of representatives, Brown served as a state representative in 1809, 1811, 1812 and in 1819. He was elected as a Federalist to the Fourteenth Congress, and served as a United States Representative for the sixteenth district for the state of Massachusetts from March 4, 1815 to March 3, 1817. After leaving office, he resumed the practice of medicine until his death.

== Family life ==
Brown married Susan Wells. His son John G. Brown married Bertha Smouse and also practiced medicine in Waldoboro and built the house on the corner of Church (now School) and Main street now known as Stahls Tavern.

== Death ==
Brown died on September 17, 1831, in Waldoboro, Maine.

U.S. House of Representatives
Preceded by Samuel Davis	Member of the U.S. House of Representatives from Massachusetts's 16th congressional district 1815 – 1817	Succeeded by Benjamin Orr
