= Joseph Walsh (Massachusetts politician) =

American politician from Massachusetts (1875–1946)

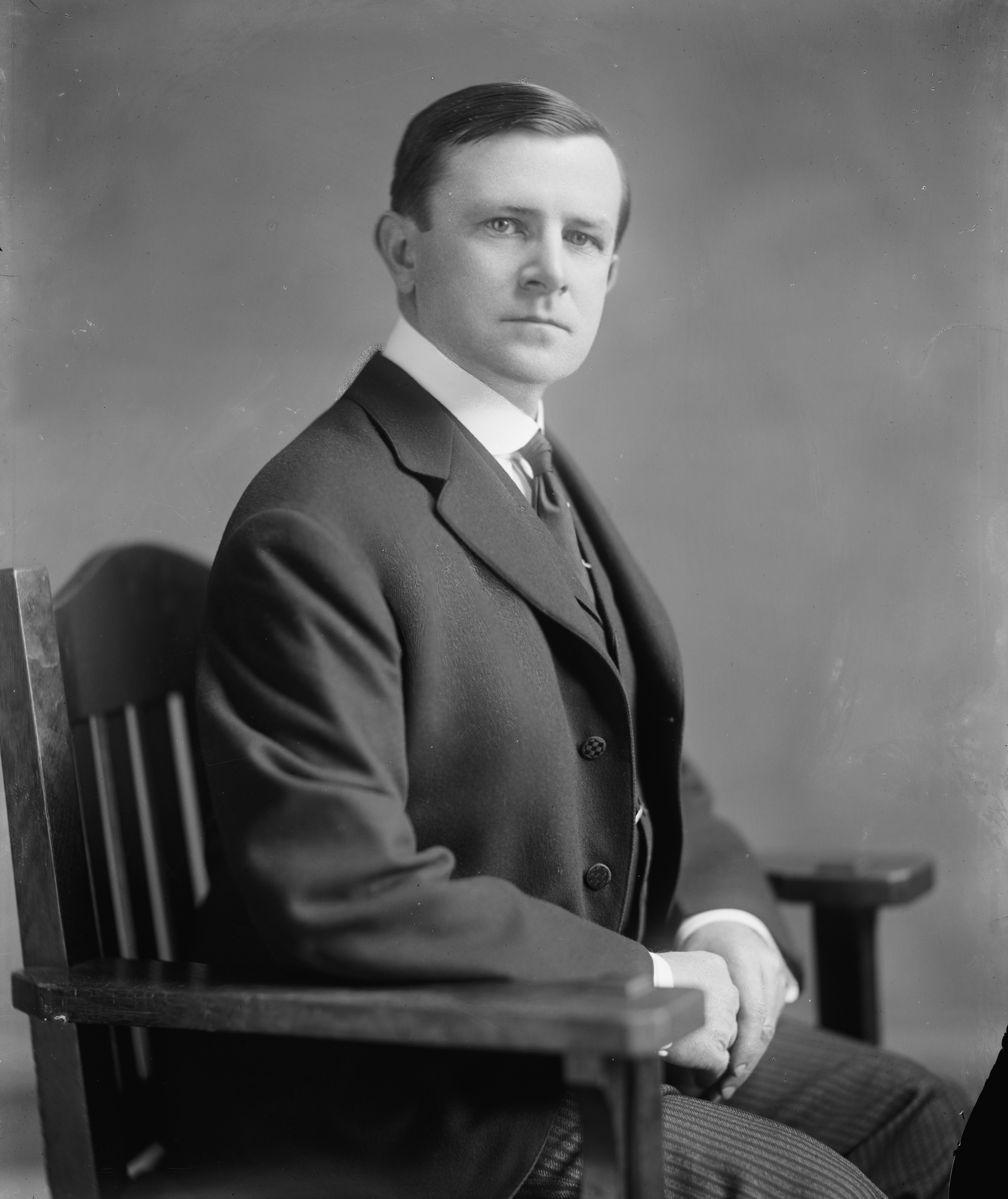

Member of the U.S. House of Representatives from Massachusetts's 16th district
- In office March 4, 1915 – August 2, 1922
- Preceded by: Thomas Chandler Thacher
- Succeeded by: Charles L. Gifford

Personal details
- Born: December 16, 1875 Boston, Massachusetts, U.S.
- Died: January 13, 1946 (aged 70) New Bedford, Massachusetts, U.S.
- Party: Republican
- Education: Boston University School of Law
- Occupation: Lawyer

Joseph Walsh (December 16, 1875 – January 13, 1946) was a member of the U.S. House of Representatives from Massachusetts.

== Biography ==
Walsh was born December 16, 1875, in the Brighton neighborhood of Boston. He attended public schools in Falmouth, Massachusetts, and the Boston University School of Law. He was admitted to the bar in 1906 and practiced in New Bedford. He served as a fish culturist and clerk in the United States Bureau of Fisheries at Woods Hole, Mass., from 1900 to 1905, and also engaged in newspaper reporting in Boston and New Bedford. He was a member of the State House of Representatives in 1905, elected as a Republican to the Sixty-Fourth and to the three succeeding Congresses, where he served from March 4, 1915, to August 21, 1922, when he resigned to accept a judicial position.

In 1917, he opposed the creation of a committee to deal with women's suffrage. Walsh thought the creation of a committee would be yielding to "the nagging of iron-jawed angels" and referred to the women picketing Woodrow Wilson's White House (the Silent Sentinels) as "bewildered, deluded creatures with short skirts and short hair." It is from this that the film Iron Jawed Angels gets its name. (The use of steel to hold open the jaws of women being force-fed after the Silent Sentinels arrests and hunger strike is also one of the film's plot points.)

Walsh was appointed a justice of the Superior Court of Massachusetts on August 2, 1922, where he served until his death. He died in New Bedford, Massachusetts, on January 13, 1946, and was buried in St. Mary's Cemetery.

U.S. House of Representatives
Preceded by Thomas C. Thacher	Member of the U.S. House of Representatives from Massachusetts's 16th congressional district 1915-1922	Succeeded by Charles L. Gifford
