= John R. Thayer =

American politician

John Randolph Thayer
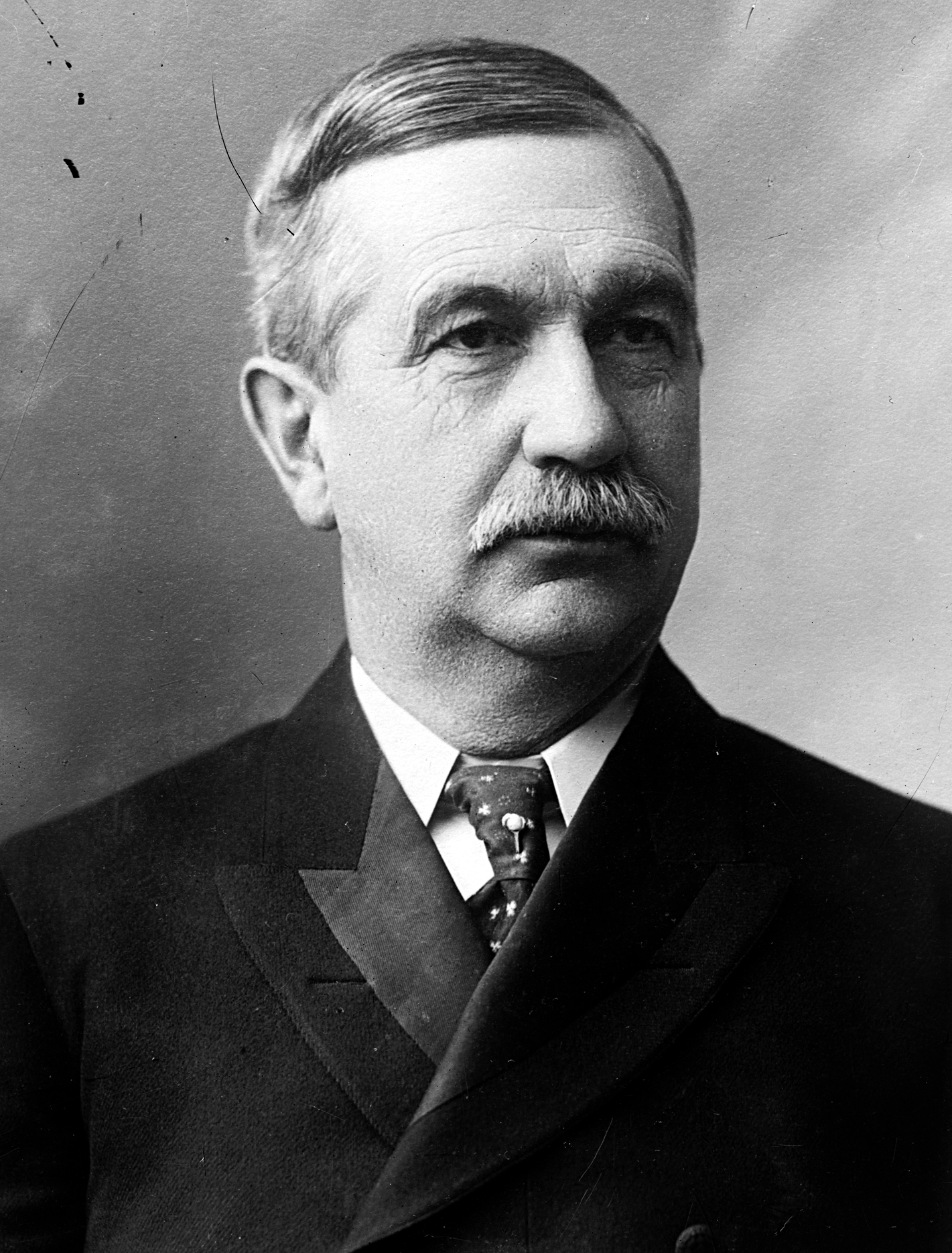

Member of the U.S. House of Representatives from Massachusetts's 3rd district
- In office March 4, 1899 – March 3, 1905
- Preceded by: Joseph H. Walker
- Succeeded by: Rockwood Hoar

Member of the Massachusetts Senate
- In office 1890-1891

Member of the Massachusetts House of Representatives
- In office 1880-1881

Personal details
- Born: March 9, 1845 Douglas, Massachusetts, U.S.
- Died: December 19, 1916 (aged 71) Worcester, Massachusetts, U.S.
- Party: Democratic
- Spouse: Charlotte D. Holmes (m. 1872)
- Education: Yale College
- Profession: Lawyer

John Randolph Thayer (March 9, 1845 – December 19, 1916) was a representative from Massachusetts. He was born in Douglas, Massachusetts, and attended the common schools and Nichols Academy in Dudley.

Thayer graduated from Yale College in 1869 where he studied law. He was admitted to the bar in 1871 and commenced practice in Worcester, Massachusetts. There, he served on the city council from 1874 to 1876 and was elected an alderman from 1878 to 1880.

He married Charlotte D. Holmes on January 30, 1872, and they had six children.

After unsuccessfully running for district attorney in 1876, he was elected a member of the Massachusetts House of Representatives in 1880 and 1881. He then ran for mayor of Worcester in 1886 without winning. He did serve in the State Senate from 1890 to 1891. After losing an election in 1892 to the 53rd United States Congress he was elected as a Democrat to the 56th, 57th, and 58th Congresses, serving from March 4, 1899, until March 3, 1905). Thayer did not seek reelection in 1904 but resumed his law practice in Worcester. He died there on December 19, 1916, and was buried at the Rural Cemetery.

U.S. House of Representatives
Preceded by Joseph H. Walker	Member of the U.S. House of Representatives from Massachusetts's 3rd congressional district March 4, 1899 – March 3, 1905	Succeeded by Rockwood Hoar
