= Gayton P. Osgood =

American politician (1797–1861)

Gayton Pickman Osgood

Member of the U.S. House of Representatives from Massachusetts's 3rd district
- In office March 4, 1833 – March 3, 1835
- Preceded by: Jeremiah Nelson
- Succeeded by: Caleb Cushing

Member of the Massachusetts House of Representatives
- In office 1829-1831

Personal details
- Born: July 4, 1797 Salem, Massachusetts
- Died: June 26, 1861 (aged 63) Andover, Massachusetts
- Education: Harvard University
- Profession: Lawyer

Gayton Pickman Osgood (July 4, 1797 – June 26, 1861) was a member of the United States House of Representatives from state Massachusetts. He was born in Salem on July 4, 1797. He graduated from Harvard University in 1815, studied law, was admitted to the bar and commenced practice in Salem. He moved to North Andover. Osgood served as a member of the Massachusetts House of Representatives, and was elected as a Jacksonian to the Twenty-third Congress (March 4, 1833 – March 3, 1835). He was an unsuccessful candidate for renomination in 1834. He retired from public life and engaged in agricultural pursuits. Osgood died in Andover on June 26, 1861. His interment was in the Old North Parish Burying Ground.

== Personal life ==
Osgood was the son of Isaac Osgood (1755–1847) and his second wife Rebecca Taylor Pickman (1775–1801), who married on December 8, 1794. His father was previously married to Rebecca's sister, Sarah (1772–1791), who he married in 1790. Following his mother's death, his father married for a third time to Mary Pickman (1765–1856) in 1802. Mary was a first cousin of Sarah and Rebecca Pickman, and the younger sister of Massachusetts Congressman Benjamin Pickman. Pickman was also Gayton Osgood's first cousin, once removed. Osgood's uncle, Samuel Osgood, was the first Postmaster General of the United States. His sister, Sally Pickman Osgood, was the mother of Massachusetts Congressman George B. Loring.

His brother, Isaac, was the father of Charlotte Emeline Osgood, who married Massachusetts Congressman Moses T. Stevens. His second cousin, twice removed was Rhode Island Governor and Senator George P. Wetmore, while Wetmore's sister, Annie, married William Watts Sherman. Wetmore and Sherman's daughter Georgette married Harold Brown (Rhode Island financier).

His third great-grandmother, Mary Clements Osgood, was accused of being a witch during the Salem Witch Trials. He is also distantly related to the Cabot family, as his grandmother, Sarah Orne Pickman, is the great-niece of Anna Orne, who married John Cabot and from whom most of the American Cabot family descends from. Through the Orne line as well, Pickman is a first cousin, three times removed of Timothy Pickering, the Second Postmaster General of the United States (following Osgood's uncle) and a United States Secretary of State, Secretary of Defense, Congressman and Senator.

U.S. House of Representatives
Preceded by Jeremiah Nelson	Member of the U.S. House of Representatives from Massachusetts's 3rd congressional district March 4, 1833 – March 3, 1835	Succeeded by Caleb Cushing
