= Joseph Burnett (educator) =

American educator and businessman

Joseph Burnett (November 11, 1820 — August 11, 1894) was an American educator, chemist, and businessman from Southborough, Massachusetts.

== Biography ==
Burnett studied medicine and pharmaceutical chemistry at Worcester Scientific and Technical College. After completing his studies in 1837, he moved to Boston and was an apprentice to Theodore Metcalf, who was the city's leading pharmacist. In 1844, Burnett and Metcalf became a full partners in the Metcalf & Burnett Chemical Company. In 1846, William T. G. Morton "performed the first public demonstration of a surgical procedure under anesthetic at Massachusetts General Hospital," and a young Dr. Burnett mixed the sulfuric ether compound to Morton's specifications.

He later opened Joseph Burnett & Company and made his fortune as the "first chemist to create a vanilla extract safe for household use, without potentially toxic levels of alcohol, and at a far more affordable cost than expensive imported European extracts made with secret proprietary formulae. Throughout the second half of the 19th century, bottles of Burnett's Vanilla Extract could be found on pantry shelves in the majority of kitchens throughout much of the world."

In 1859, Burnett proposed establishing an Episcopal Church in Southborough. St. Mark's Church was formally chartered in 1860 and consecrated in 1863. Inspired by St. Paul's School, Burnett founded St. Mark's School in 1865 for "…the training up of boys in godliness, healthiness, and in all good learning." He also played a large role in establishing Fay School.

Burnett was also the owner and proprietor of Deerfoot Farms; he brought various breeds of English cows to the U.S. and created one of the region’s largest dairy-producing enterprises.

== Personal Life ==
He married Josephine Cutter (March 4, 1830 — December 26, 1906) in 1848 and they would raise a family of 12 children over the years: Edward Burnett (1849-1925), Everett Harry Burnett (1850-1927), Robert Manton Burnett (1852-1929), Waldo Burnett (1855-1935), Josephine Burnett (1856-1937), Esther Burnett (1859-1954), Ruth Burnett (1862-1944), Charles Cutter Burnett (1864-1900), Richard Torrey Burnett (1866-1867), Louisa Burnett (1869-1929), John Torrey Burnett (1869-1929), and Elinor Burnett (1872-1953).

Many of their children married members of other prominent Boston families. His son Edward Burnett served a term as a United States congressman. Edward's wife was Mabel Lowell, the daughter of American writer and diplomat James Russell Lowell, who inherited her father's house Elmwood, currently home to the President of Harvard University.
