= Charles G. Washburn =

American politician

Charles Grenfill Washburn
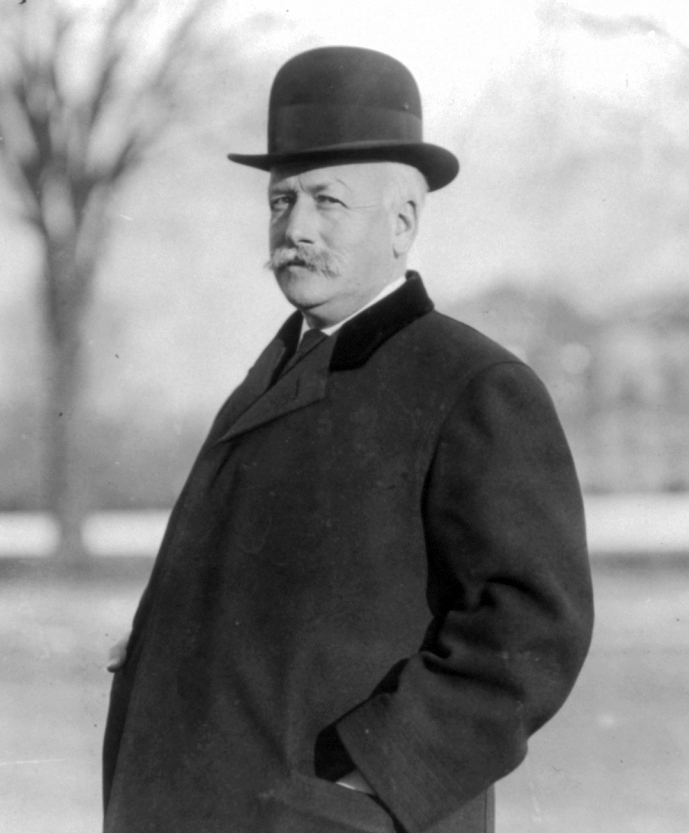
- Charles G. Washburn circa 1908

Member of the U.S. House of Representatives from Massachusetts's 3rd district
- In office December 18, 1906 – March 3, 1911
- Preceded by: Rockwood Hoar
- Succeeded by: John A. Thayer

Member of the Massachusetts Senate
- In office 1899–1900

Member of the Massachusetts House of Representatives
- In office 1897–1898

Delegate to the 1904 Republican National Convention
- In office 1904–1904

Personal details
- Born: January 28, 1857 Worcester, Massachusetts, US
- Died: May 25, 1928 (aged 71) Lenox, Massachusetts, US
- Party: Republican
- Relations: Robert M. Washburn (brother)
- Education: Worcester Polytechnic Institute; Harvard University
- Profession: Attorney

Charles Grenfill Washburn (January 28, 1857 – May 25, 1928) was a member of the United States House of Representatives from Massachusetts.

== Biography ==
He was born in Worcester on January 28, 1857. Washburn graduated from Worcester Polytechnic Institute in 1875 and from Harvard University in 1880. He studied law, and was admitted to the Suffolk bar in 1887. He connected with various manufacturing enterprises in the city of his birth.

Washburn was elected a member of the Massachusetts House of Representatives and served in the Massachusetts Senate. He was a member of the committee to revise the State corporation laws in 1902. He was a delegate to the Republican National Conventions in 1904 and 1916, and was elected as a Republican to the Fifty-ninth Congress to fill the vacancy caused by the death of Rockwood Hoar. He was reelected to the Sixtieth and Sixty-first Congresses and served from December 18, 1906, to March 3, 1911.

He was an unsuccessful candidate for reelection to the Sixty-second Congress. After completing his term, he served as director of the Federal Reserve Bank of Boston. He became president of the Washburn Co. of Worcester, and served in that capacity until his death in Lenox on May 25, 1928. His interment was in Rural Cemetery in Worcester.

== Bibliography ==
- Haynes, George Henry.: The Life of Charles G. Washburn. Boston and New York: Houghton Mifflin Company, 1931.
- Who's who in State Politics, 1908 Practical Politics (1908) p. 22.

U.S. House of Representatives
Preceded by Rockwood Hoar	Member of the U.S. House of Representatives from Massachusetts's 3rd congressional district December 18, 1906 – March 3, 1911	Succeeded by John A. Thayer
