= Orchard Cook =

American politician

Member of the U.S. House of Representatives from Massachusetts's 16th district
- In office March 4, 1805 – March 3, 1811
- Preceded by: Samuel Thatcher
- Succeeded by: Peleg Tallman

Personal details
- Born: March 24, 1763 Salem, Province of Massachusetts Bay, British America
- Died: August 12, 1819 (aged 56) Wiscasset, Massachusetts, U.S. (now Maine)
- Party: Democratic-Republican
- Occupation: Merchant

Orchard Cook (March 24, 1763 – August 12, 1819) was a U.S. representative from Massachusetts.

Born in Salem in the Province of Massachusetts Bay, Cook attended the public schools, and engaged in mercantile pursuits. He served as Assessor of Pownalborough in 1786, and Town clerk of New Milford, in the District of Maine from 1795 to 1797. He was a Justice of the Peace, served as judge of the court of common pleas for Lincoln County 1799–1810, was appointed assistant assessor of the twenty-fifth district in November 1798, and served as overseer of Bowdoin College from 1800 to 1805.

Cook was elected as a Democratic-Republican to the Ninth, Tenth, and Eleventh Congresses (March 4, 1805 – March 3, 1811). He was not a candidate for renomination in 1810. He then served as Sheriff of Lincoln County in 1811, and Postmaster of Wiscasset in Massachusetts' District of Maine from 1811 until his death there August 12, 1819. He was interred in Evergreen Cemetery.

== Sources ==
- United States Congress. "Orchard Cook (id: C000723)". Biographical Directory of the United States Congress.

U.S. House of Representatives
| Preceded by Samuel Thatcher | Member of the U.S. House of Representatives from Massachusetts's 16th congressional district 1805-1811 | Succeeded by Peleg Tallman |
