= Edward Burnett =

American politician (1849–1925)

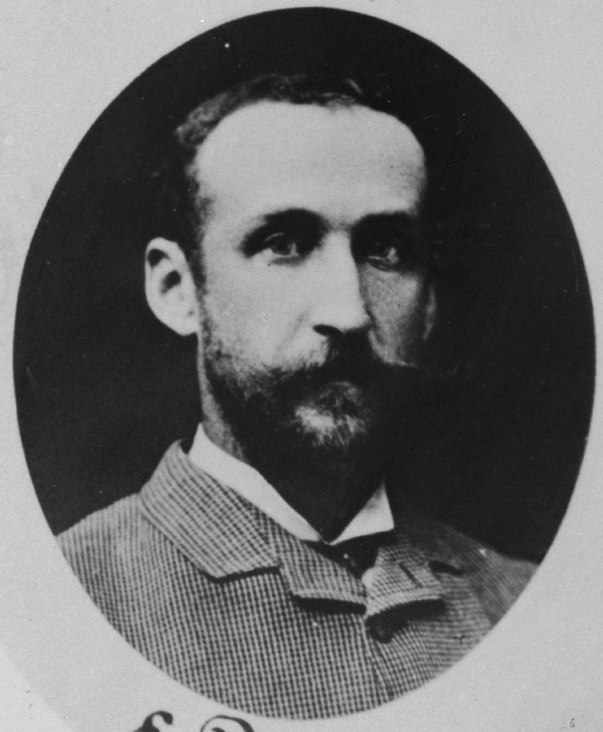

Member of the U.S. House of Representatives from Massachusetts's 9th district
- In office March 4, 1887 – March 3, 1889
- Preceded by: Frederick D. Ely
- Succeeded by: John W. Candler

Personal details
- Born: March 16, 1849
- Died: November 5, 1925 (aged 76)
- Party: Democratic

Edward Burnett (March 16, 1849 – November 5, 1925) was a U.S. representative from Massachusetts.

Born in Boston, Massachusetts, Burnett attended St. Paul's School. He was graduated from St. Mark's School, Southboro, Massachusetts, which had been founded by his father Joseph Burnett in 1867 and from Harvard University in 1871. He engaged in agricultural pursuits near Southboro, Massachusetts. He was among the breeders who were originators of the Boston Terrier. He was an early member of the Tavern Club founded mostly by fellow Harvard alumni. He married Mabel Lowell, daughter of Boston Brahmin man of letters and diplomat James Russell Lowell and Maria White Lowell.

Burnett was elected as a Democrat to the Fiftieth Congress (March 4, 1887 – March 3, 1889). He was an unsuccessful candidate for reelection in 1888 to the Fifty-first Congress.

He served as general manager of Florham Farm the property of Hamilton McKown Twombly and Florence Adele Vanderbilt Twombly in what is now Florham Park, near Madison, New Jersey from 1892 to 1900. He was also designer and manager of farms for Florence's brothers, George Washington Vanderbilt and Frederick William Vanderbilt. He became engaged as a farm architect in New York City from 1900 to 1925, for a short time in partnership with Alfred Hopkins.

He died in Milton, Massachusetts, November 5, 1925 and was interred in St. Mark's Churchyard, Southboro, Massachusetts.

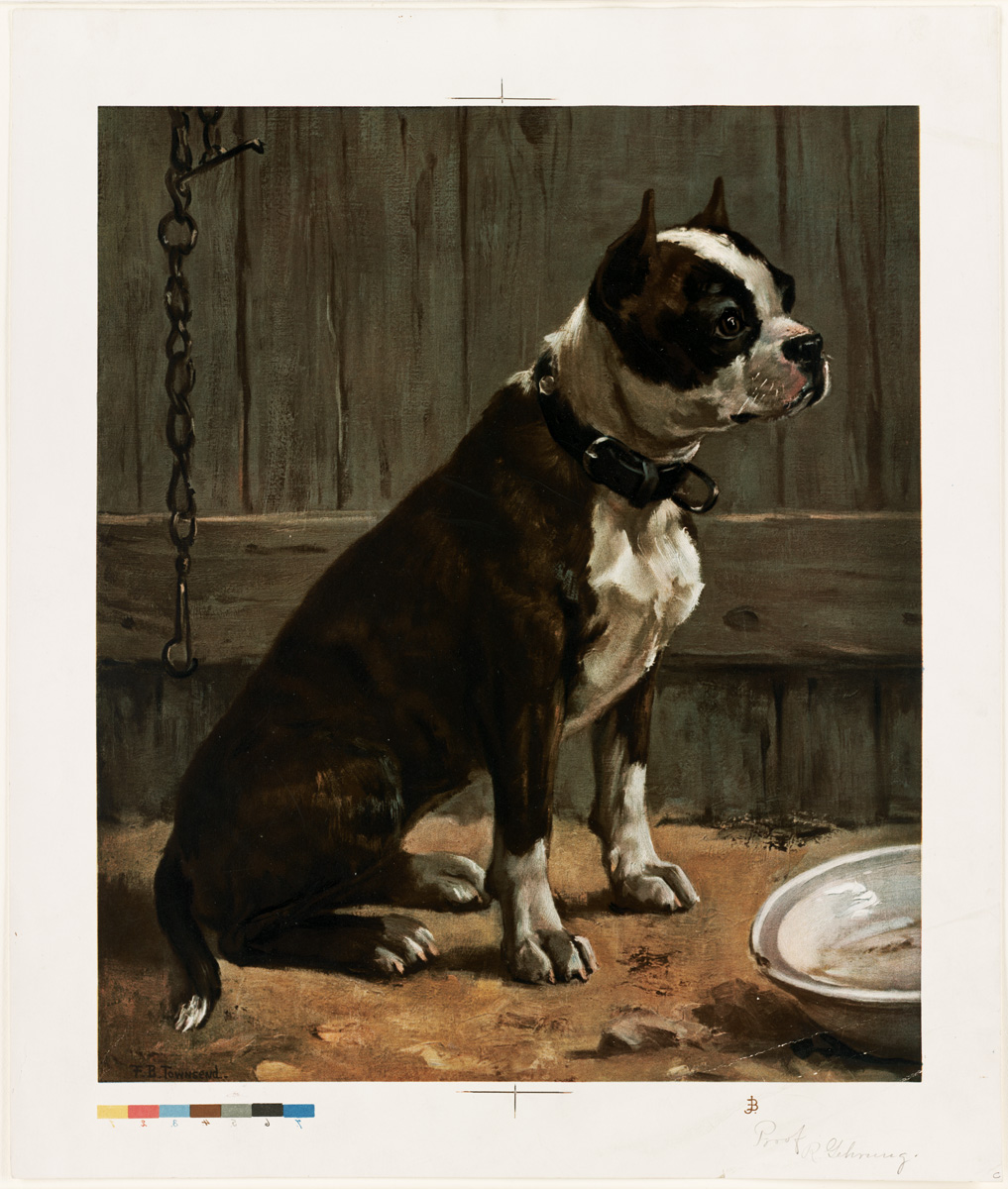
Terrier Seated (Old Boston Bulldog) by Frances B. Townsend, Boston Public Library, 19th century

U.S. House of Representatives
Preceded by Frederick D. Ely	Member of the U.S. House of Representatives from Massachusetts's 9th congressional district March 4, 1887 – March 3, 1889	Succeeded by John W. Candler
