= John A. Thayer =

American politician (1857–1917)

John Alden Thayer
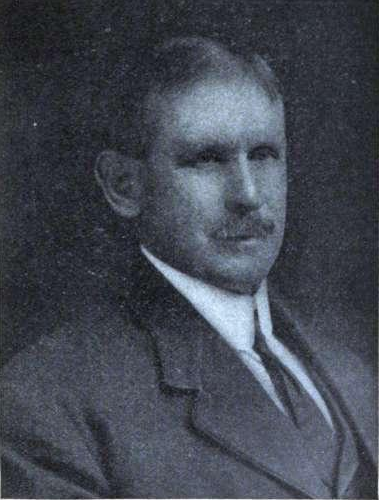
- John Alden Thayer circa 1912

Member of the U.S. House of Representatives from Massachusetts's 3rd district
- In office March 4, 1911 – March 3, 1913
- Preceded by: Charles G. Washburn
- Succeeded by: William Wilder

Personal details
- Born: December 22, 1857 Worcester, Massachusetts, U.S.
- Died: July 31, 1917 (aged 59) Boston, Massachusetts, U.S.
- Resting place: Hope Cemetery; Worcester, Massachusetts, U.S.
- Party: Democratic
- Education: Harvard College, 1879; Columbia Law School 1889
- Profession: Attorney

John Alden Thayer (December 22, 1857 – July 31, 1917) was a Representative from Massachusetts.

He was born in Worcester, Massachusetts. He was the son of Eli Thayer. He graduated from Harvard College in 1879. He studied law at Columbia Law School in New York City. He was admitted to the bar in 1889 and was a clerk of the central district court of Worcester from 1892 to 1897.

He was elected as a Democrat to the Sixty-second Congress from March 4, 1911 to March 3, 1913. He failed reelection in 1912 to the Sixty-third Congress. He was a delegate to the Democratic National Convention in 1912. In 1915, he was appointed postmaster of Worcester, and served until his death.

== Hospitalization and death ==
In mid July 1917 Thayer was admitted into the Peter Bent Brigham Hospital in Boston where he died on July 31, 1917. He was buried in Hope Cemetery in Worcester.

== Bibliography ==
- The Boston Globe, John Alden Thayer of Worcester Dead; Postmaster Passes Away in Boston Hospital Third District Elected Him to Congress in 1910 August 1, 1917), p. 14.
- Who's who in State Politics, 1912 Practical Politics (1912) p. 27.
- United States Congress. "John A. Thayer (id: T000147)". Biographical Directory of the United States Congress.

U.S. House of Representatives
Preceded by Charles G. Washburn	Member of the U.S. House of Representatives from Massachusetts's 3rd congressional district March 4, 1911 – March 3, 1913	Succeeded by William H. Wilder
