= Benjamin Orr (Massachusetts politician) =

American politician

Member of the U.S. House of Representatives from Massachusetts's 16th district
- In office March 4, 1817 – March 3, 1819
- Preceded by: Benjamin Brown
- Succeeded by: Mark Langdon Hill

Personal details
- Born: December 1, 1772 Bedford, Province of New Hampshire, British America
- Died: September 3, 1828 (aged 55) Brunswick, Maine, U.S.
- Party: Federalist
- Education: Dartmouth College
- Occupation: Lawyer; Carpenter

Benjamin Orr (December 1, 1772 – September 3, 1828) was a member of the United States House of Representatives from Massachusetts.

== Biography ==
=== Early life and education ===
Orr was born in Bedford in the Province of New Hampshire on December 1, 1772. He was self-educated and apprenticed as a carpenter. He attended Fryeburg Academy, taught school at Concord and New Milford, New Hampshire; and graduated from Dartmouth College in 1798. He studied law, was admitted to the bar in 1801 and commenced the practice of law in Brunswick in Massachusetts' District of Maine.

=== Career ===
Orr moved to Topsham, in 1801 and continued the practice of law; was overseer of Bowdoin College in Brunswick, and served as trustee from 1814 to 1828 and as treasurer in 1815 and 1816.

Orr was elected as a Federalist to the Fifteenth Congress (March 4, 1817 – March 3, 1819) but was not a candidate for renomination in 1818.

He resumed the practice of law in Topsham and, in 1822, returned to Brunswick to continue the practice of law.

=== Death ===
He died in Brunswick, Maine on September 3, 1828, and he was interred in Pine Grove Cemetery.

== Sources ==
- United States Congress. "Benjamin Orr (id: O000102)". Biographical Directory of the United States Congress.

U.S. House of Representatives
Preceded by Benjamin Brown	Member of the U.S. House of Representatives from Massachusetts's 16th congressional district (Maine district); March 4, 1817 – March 3, 1819	Succeeded by Mark Langdon Hill
