= Samuel Davis (American politician) =

American politician

Member of the U.S. House of Representatives from Massachusetts's 16th district
- In office March 4, 1813 – March 3, 1815
- Preceded by: Peleg Tallman
- Succeeded by: Benjamin Brown

Personal details
- Born: 1774 Bath, Massachusetts Bay, British America (now Maine)
- Died: April 20, 1831 (aged 56–57) Bath, Maine, U.S.
- Party: Federalist
- Occupation: Merchant

Samuel Davis (1774 – April 20, 1831) was a U.S. representative from Massachusetts.

== Biography ==
Born in Bath in Massachusetts Bay's Province of Maine, Davis engaged in mercantile pursuits and became a shipowner in 1801. He served as member of the Massachusetts House of Representatives in 1803 and 1808-1812. He served as overseer of Bowdoin College from 1813 to 1818 and as president of Lincoln Bank in Bath in 1813.

Davis was elected as a Federalist to the Thirteenth Congress (March 4, 1813 - March 3, 1815). He was again a member of the Massachusetts House of Representatives in 1815 and 1816.

In his private life he was a merchant in African and West Indian trade.

He died in Bath, Maine, on April 20, 1831, and was interred in Maple Grove Cemetery.

U.S. House of Representatives
Preceded by Peleg Tallman	Member of the U.S. House of Representatives from Massachusetts's 16th congressional district 1813-1815	Succeeded by Benjamin Brown
