= Massachusetts's 16th congressional district =

Obsolete political district in Massachusetts, US

- Obsolete district
- Created: 1803; 1910
- Eliminated: 1820; 1930
- Years active: 1803–1821; 1913–1933

Massachusetts's current districts, since 2013

Massachusetts's 16th congressional district is an obsolete district. It was first active 1803–1821 in the District of Maine and again active 1913–1933 in the Cape Cod region. It was eliminated in 1933 after the 1930 census. Its last congressman was Charles L. Gifford, who was redistricted into the 15th district.

== Cities and towns in the district ==
=== 1910s ===
"Barnstable County: Towns of Barnstable, Bourne, Brewster, Chatham, Dennis, Eastham, Falmonth, Harwich, Mashpee, Orleans, Provincetown, Sandwich, Truro, Wellfleet, and Yarmouth. Bristol County: City of New Bedford; towns of Acushnet, Dartmouth, and Fairhaven. Plymouth County: Towns of Bridgewater, Carver, Duxbury, Halifax, Hanover, Hanson, Hingham, Hull, Kingston, Marion, Marshfield, Mattapoisett, Middleboro, Norwell, Pembroke, Plymouth, Plympton, Rochester, Scituate, and Wareham. Norfolk County: Town of Cohasset. Dukes and Nantucket Counties."

== List of members representing the district ==
| Representative | Party | Years | Cong ress | Electoral history | District location |
|---|---|---|---|---|---|
District created March 3, 1803
| Samuel Thatcher (Warren) | Federalist | March 4, 1803 – March 3, 1805 | 8th | Redistricted from the 12th district and re-elected in 1802. Lost re-election. | 1803–1813 "Lincoln district," District of Maine |
| Orchard Cook (Wiscasset) | Democratic- Republican | March 4, 1805 – March 3, 1811 | 9th 10th 11th | Elected in 1804. Re-elected in 1806. Re-elected in 1808. Retired. | 1803–1813 "Lincoln district," District of Maine |
| Peleg Tallman (Bath) | Democratic- Republican | March 4, 1811 – March 3, 1813 | 12th | Elected in 1810. Retired. | 1803–1813 "Lincoln district," District of Maine |
| Samuel Davis (Bath) | Federalist | March 4, 1813 – March 3, 1815 | 13th | Elected in 1812. Redistricted to the 19th district and lost re-election. | 1813–1821 "3rd Eastern district," District of Maine |
| Benjamin Brown (Waldoborough) | Federalist | March 4, 1815 – March 3, 1817 | 14th | Elected in 1814. Ran in the 18th district and lost re-election. | 1813–1821 "3rd Eastern district," District of Maine |
| Benjamin Orr (Brunswick) | Federalist | March 4, 1817 – March 3, 1819 | 15th | Elected in 1816. Lost re-election. | 1813–1821 "3rd Eastern district," District of Maine |
| Mark Langdon Hill (Phippsburg) | Democratic- Republican | March 4, 1819 – March 3, 1821 | 16th | Elected in 1819 on the third ballot. District moved to Maine. | 1813–1821 "3rd Eastern district," District of Maine |
District moved to Maine March 3, 1821
District restored in Massachusetts March 3, 1913
| Thomas Chandler Thacher (Yarmouth) | Democratic | March 4, 1913 – March 3, 1915 | 63rd | Elected in 1912. Lost re-election. | 1803–1813 [data missing] |
| Joseph Walsh (New Bedford) | Republican | March 4, 1915 – August 21, 1922 | 64th 65th 66th 67th | Elected in 1914. Re-elected in 1916. Re-elected in 1918. Re-elected in 1920. Resigned to become a justice of the Massachusetts Superior Court. | 1803–1813 [data missing] |
| Vacant | | August 21, 1922 – November 7, 1922 | 67th | | 1803–1813 [data missing] |
| Charles L. Gifford (Cotuit) | Republican | November 7, 1922 – March 3, 1933 | 67th 68th 69th 70th 71st 72nd | Elected to finish Walsh's term Re-elected in 1922. Re-elected in 1924. Re-elected in 1926. Re-elected in 1928. Re-elected in 1930. Redistricted to the 15th district. | 1803–1813 [data missing] |
District eliminated March 3, 1933
