= Mark Langdon Hill =

American politician (1772–1842)

Member of the U.S. House of Representatives
- In office March 4, 1819 – March 3, 1823
- Preceded by: Benjamin Orr
- Succeeded by: Ebenezer Herrick
- Constituency: Massachusetts 16th (1819–1821); Maine 3rd (1821–1823)

Personal details
- Born: June 30, 1772 Biddeford, Province of Massachusetts Bay, British America
- Died: November 26, 1842 (aged 70) Phippsburg, Maine, U.S.
- Party: Democratic-Republican
- Occupation: Merchant

Mark Langdon Hill (June 30, 1772 – November 26, 1842) was United States Representative from Massachusetts and from Maine. He was born in Biddeford (then a part of the Province of Massachusetts Bay) on June 30, 1772. He attended the public schools, then became a merchant and shipbuilder in Phippsburg. He was an overseer and trustee of Bowdoin College. He is the nephew of John Langdon. New Hampshire governor, Senator and patriot.

Hill was elected a member of the Massachusetts House of Representatives, and served in the Massachusetts State Senate. He served as judge of the court of common pleas in 1810. He was elected a member of the American Antiquarian Society in 1816. He was elected as a Democratic-Republican from Massachusetts to the Sixteenth Congress (March 4, 1819 – March 3, 1821). Hill and John Holmes were two of the seven representatives from the district of Maine willing to vote for the Missouri compromise, which on a 90-87 vote allowed Maine to become a state at the cost of letting Missouri be a slave state. They were both strongly attacked in the Maine press for this compromise.

Hill was elected as a Democratic-Republican to the Seventeenth Congress from Maine after the state was admitted to the Union (March 4, 1821 – March 3, 1823). He was postmaster of Phippsburg 1819-1824. He was appointed as a collector of customs at Bath in 1824. Hill died in Phippsburg on November 26, 1842. His interment was in the churchyard of the Congregational Church in Phippsburg Center.
