= 1800–01 United States House of Representatives elections =

- April 29, 1800 – August 1, 1801

All 106 seats in the United States House of Representatives 54 seats needed for a majority
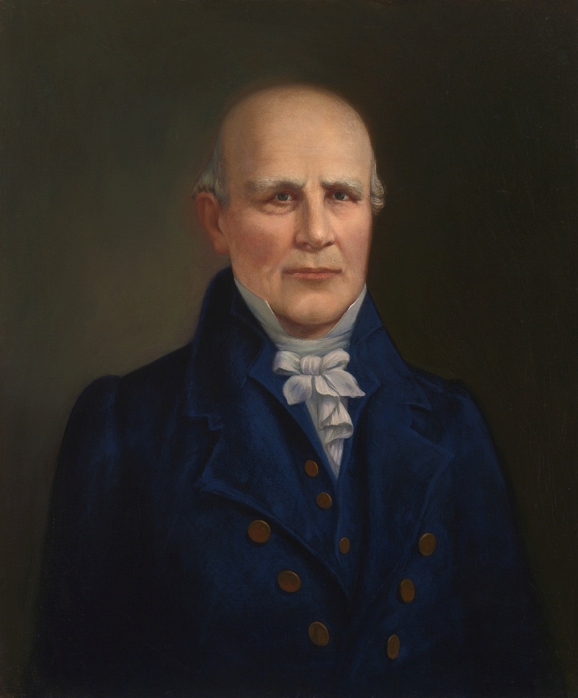

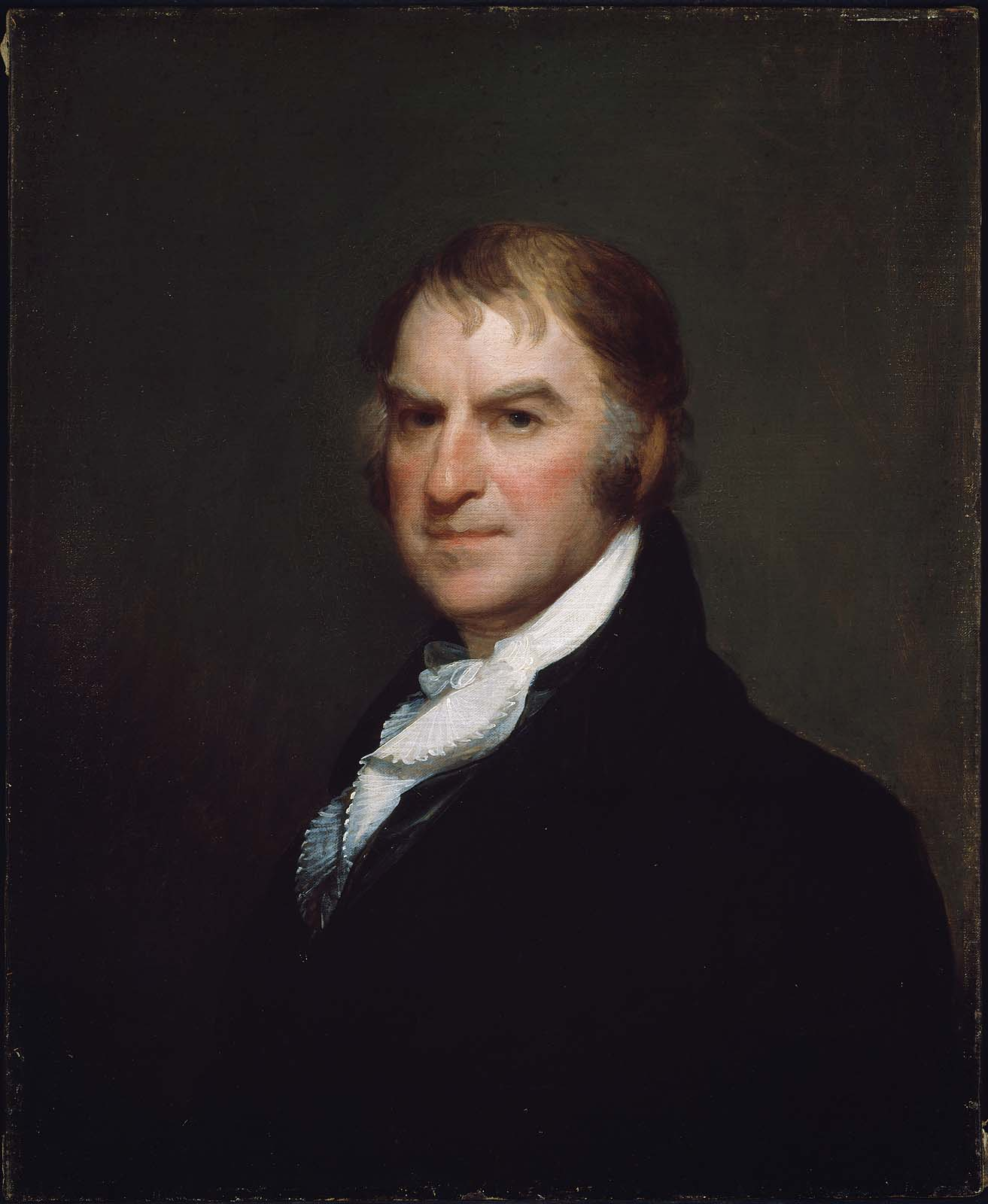
	Majority party	Minority party
Leader	Nathaniel Macon	Theodore Sedgwick
Party	Democratic-Republican	Federalist
Leader's seat	North Carolina 5th	Massachusetts 1st
Last election	46 seats	60 seats
Seats won	68	38
Seat change	▲22	▼22
- Results: Federalist hold Federalist gain Democratic-Republican hold Democratic-Republican gain Undistricted territory
Speaker before election
Theodore Sedgwick
Federalist
Elected Speaker
Nathaniel Macon
Democratic-Republican

The 1800–01 United States House of Representatives elections were held on various dates in various states between April 29, 1800, and August 1, 1801. Each state set its own date for its elections to the House of Representatives before the first session of the 7th United States Congress convened on December 7, 1801. They were held at the same time as the 1800 presidential election, in which Vice President Thomas Jefferson, a Democratic Republican, defeated incumbent President John Adams, a Federalist. Elections were held for all 106 seats, representing 15 states.

These elections resulted in the Democratic-Republicans picking up 22 seats from the Federalists. This brought the Democratic-Republicans a solid majority of 68 seats, whereas the Federalists were only able to secure 38. Many state legislatures also changed to Democratic-Republican control, with the result that many new Democratic-Republicans were voted into the Senate. The Federalists never again succeeded in gaining a majority of seats in the House of Representatives, and the national Federalist Party disintegrated completely in the early 1820s.

The victory of Jefferson and the Democratic-Republicans can be attributed partially to unpopular policies pursued by the Adams administration, including the Alien and Sedition Acts, which sought to curtail guarantees of freedom of speech and freedom of the press spelled out in the Bill of Rights.

The difference between Federalist policies in support of a strong national government and the Democratic-Republican preference for states' rights played a prominent role in the election. Federal taxation became an issue as Southerners and Westerners rejected federal taxes levied on property.

== Election summaries ==
↓
68	38
Democratic-Republican	Federalist

State	Type	Date	Total seats	Democratic- Republican		Federalist	
State	Type	Date	Total seats	Seats	Change	Seats	Change
New York	Districts	April 29 – May 1, 1800	10	6	Steady	4	Steady
North Carolina	Districts	August 15, 1800	10	6	Steady	4	Steady
New Hampshire	At-large	August 25, 1800	4	0	Steady	4	Steady
Rhode Island	At-large	August 26, 1800 (Note: n Majority required for electionecessitating an April 15, 1801 second ballot for one seat.)	2	2	▲2	0	▼2
Vermont	Districts	September 2, 1800 (Note: n Majority required for electionecessitating a December 2, 1800 second ballot for one seat.)	2	1	Steady	1	Steady
Connecticut	At-large	September 22, 1800	7	0	Steady	7	Steady
Georgia	At-large	October 6, 1800	2	2	▲2	0	▼2
Delaware	At-large	October 7, 1800	1	0	Steady	1	Steady
Pennsylvania	Districts	October 14, 1800	13	10	▲2	3	▼2
South Carolina	Districts	October 24, 1800	6	3	▲2	3	▼2
Massachusetts	Districts	November 3, 1800 (Note: n Majority required for electionecessitating a March 9, 1801 second ballot for two seats.)	14	7	▲5	7	▼5
New Jersey	At-large	December 24, 1800	5	5	▲2	0	▼2
Maryland	Districts	January 1, 1801	8	5	▲2	3	▼2
Late elections (After the March 4, 1801 beginning of the next Congress)
Virginia	Districts	April 23, 1801	19	18	▲5	1	▼5
Kentucky	Districts	August 3, 1801	2	2	Steady	0	Steady
Tennessee	At-large	August 4, 1801	1	1	Steady	0	Steady
Total			106	68 64.2%	▲22	38 35.8%	▼22

House seats
Dem-Republican	64.15%
Federalist	35.85%

== Special elections ==
There were special elections in 1800 and 1801 during the 6th United States Congress and 7th United States Congress.

Elections are sorted here by date then district.

=== 6th Congress ===
District	Incumbent			This race	
District	Member / Delegate	Party	First elected	Results	Candidates
Virginia 13	John Marshall	Federalist	1799	Incumbent resigned June 7, 1800, to become U.S. Secretary of State. New member elected July 31, 1800 and seated November 26, 1800. Democratic-Republican gain.	▌ ✓ Littleton W. Tazewell (Democratic-Republican) 64.5%; ▌John Mayo (Federalist) 35.5%
Connecticut at-large	Jonathan Brace	Federalist	1798 (special)	Incumbent resigned in May 1800. New member elected September 22, 1800 and seated November 17, 1800. Federalist hold. Winner was also elected to the next term; see below.	▌ ✓ John Cotton Smith (Federalist) 2,916 votes; ▌Elias Perkins (Federalist) 1,315 votes; ▌Timothy Pitkin (Unknown) 669 votes; ▌Simeon Baldwin (Federalist) 642 votes; ▌Calvin Goddard (Federalist) 365 votes; ▌Benjamin Talmadge (Unknown) 365 votes; ▌John Treadwell (Federalist) 116 votes; ▌Stephen T. Hosmer (Unknown) 34 votes
Massachusetts 4	Dwight Foster	Federalist	1793	Incumbent resigned June 7, 1800, when elected U.S. Senator. New member elected October 20, 1800 and seated February 6, 1801. Democratic-Republican gain.	First ballot (August 25, 1800): ▌Levi Lincoln Sr. (Democratic-Republican) 47.1%; ▌Jabez Upham (Federalist) 25.9%; ▌Seth Hastings (Federalist) 13.7%; ▌Salem Towne (Federalist) 11.6%; Scattering 1.7%; Second ballot (October 20, 1800): ▌ ✓ Levi Lincoln Sr. (Democratic-Republican) 49.8%; ▌Jabez Upham (Federalist) 38.9%; ▌Seth Hastings (Federalist) 6.0%; ▌Salem Towne (Federalist) 4.7%; Scattering 0.7%
Massachusetts 10	Samuel Sewall	Federalist	1796 (Special)	Incumbent resigned January 10, 1800. New member elected October 20, 1800 and seated February 6, 1801. Federalist hold.	First ballot (August 25, 1800): ▌ Nathan Read (Federalist) 45.3%; ▌ Jacob Crowninshield (Democratic-Republican) 49.2%; Scattering 5.5%; Second ballot (October 20, 1800): ▌ ✓ Nathan Read (Federalist) 53.5%; ▌Jacob Crowninshield (Democratic-Republican) 46.5%
New Hampshire at-large	William Gordon	Federalist	1796	Incumbent resigned June 12, 1800, to become state attorney general. New member elected October 27, 1800. Federalist hold. Winner also elected to next term; see below.	First ballot (August 25, 1800): ▌ Samuel Tenney (Federalist) 45.6%; ▌ George B. Upham (Federalist) 21.5%; ▌John Goddard (Democratic-Republican) 13.04%; ▌Joseph Badger (Democratic-Republican) 10.91%; ▌Thomas Cogswell (Democratic-Republican) 4.62%; ▌Joseph Peirce (Federalist) 4.34%; Second ballot (October 27, 1800): ▌ ✓ Samuel Tenney (Federalist) 70.79%; ▌George B. Upham (Federalist) 29.21%
Northwest Territory at-large	William Henry Harrison	None	1799	Incumbent resigned to become Governor of Indiana Territory. New member elected November 6, 1800 by the territorial legislature and seated November 24, 1800. Federalist gain. Winner was not a candidate for the next term; see below.	▌ ✓ William McMillan (Federalist); [data missing]
Massachusetts 3	Samuel Lyman	Federalist	1794	Incumbent resigned November 6, 1800. New member elected December 15, 1800 and seated February 2, 1801. Federalist hold.	▌ ✓ Ebenezer Mattoon (Federalist) Uncontested
Pennsylvania 8	Thomas Hartley	Federalist	1788	Incumbent died December 21, 1800. New member elected January 15, 1801 and seated February 3, 1801. Democratic-Republican gain. Winner had already been elected to the next term; see below.	▌ ✓ John Stewart (Democratic-Republican) 87.82%; Scattering 12.18%

=== 7th Congress ===
District	Incumbent			This race	
District	Representative	Party	First elected	Results	Candidates
Georgia at-large	James Jones	Democratic- Republican	1798	Incumbent died January 11, 1801, before the beginning of the Congress. New member elected March 23, 1801. Democratic-Republican hold.	▌ ✓ John Milledge (Democratic-Republican) 67.3%; ▌William Smith (Unknown) 16.0%; ▌Peter Van Allen (Unknown) 12.6%; ▌George Jones (Democratic-Republican) 4.2%
Connecticut at-large	Elizur Goodrich	Federalist	1799 (special)	Incumbent resigned March 3, 1801. New member elected April 9, 1801. Federalist hold.	▌ ✓ Calvin Goddard (Federalist)
Massachusetts 14	George Thatcher	Federalist	1788	Incumbent declined re-election. New member elected June 22, 1801 and seated December 7, 1801. Democratic-Republican gain.	▌ ✓ Richard Cutts (Democratic-Republican) 55.6%; ▌John Lords (Federalist) 34.5%; ▌Benjamin Greene (Unknown) 9.9%
North Carolina 8	David Stone	Federalist	1798	Incumbent elected U.S. Senator, and therefore chose not to serve in the House in the 7th Congress. New member elected August 6, 1801 and seated December 7, 1801. Democratic-Republican gain.	▌ ✓ Charles Johnson (Democratic-Republican) 53.2%; ▌Thomas Wynns (Democratic-Republican) 46.8%; ▌Thomas Johnston (Democratic-Republican) 0.03%
Massachusetts 4	Levi Lincoln	Democratic- Republican	1800	Incumbent resigned March 5, 1801, to become U.S. Attorney General. New member elected August 24, 1801 and seated January 11, 1802. Federalist gain.	▌ ✓ Seth Hastings (Federalist) 54.25%; ▌John Whiting (Democratic-Republican) 45.75%
Connecticut at-large	William Edmond	Federalist	1797 (special)	Incumbent resigned March 3, 1801. New member elected September 21, 1801. Federalist hold.	▌ ✓ Benjamin Tallmadge (Federalist)
New York 6	John Bird	Federalist	1798	Incumbent resigned July 25, 1801. New member elected October 8, 1801 and seated December 7, 1801. Democratic-Republican gain.	▌ ✓ John Peter Van Ness (Democratic-Republican) 64.04%; ▌Hezekiah L. Hosmer (Federalist) 35.96%
New York 5	Thomas Tillotson	Democratic- Republican	1800	Incumbent resigned August 10, 1801, to become N.Y. Secretary of State. New member elected October 8, 1801 and seated December 7, 1801. Democratic-Republican hold.	▌ ✓ Theodorus Bailey (Democratic-Republican); Uncontested
Pennsylvania 4	Peter Muhlenberg	Democratic- Republican	1798	Incumbent elected U.S. Senator, and therefore declined to serve in the House in the 7th Congress. New member elected October 13, 1801 and seated December 7, 1801. Democratic-Republican hold.	▌ ✓ Isaac Van Horne (Democratic-Republican); Uncontested
Pennsylvania 12	Albert Gallatin	Democratic- Republican	1794	Incumbent appointed U.S. Treasury May 14, 1801, during the 7th Congress but before that congress formally convened. New member elected October 13, 1801 and seated December 7, 1801. Democratic-Republican hold.	▌ ✓ William Hoge (Democratic-Republican) 82.6%; ▌Alexander Fowler (Federalist) 14.7%; ▌Isaac Weaver (Democratic-Republican) 2.7%
Massachusetts 12	Silas Lee	Federalist	1800	Incumbent resigned August 20, 1801. No majority was achieved on the September 25, 1801, and December 7, 1801, ballots, so the election was continued in 1802.	▌Orchard Cook (Democratic-Republican); ▌Martin Kingsley (Democratic-Republican); ▌Nathaniel Drummer (Unknown)

== Connecticut ==
Note: Between the two sources used, there is disagreement over the ordering of the candidates. Both sources have the same numbers of votes recorded, but disagree on which candidates received those votes, one source lists Goddard as 8th, Talmadge as 9th, etc., as listed here, while the other has them as 11th, 12th, etc., three places off for all of them until the bottom three listed here which are moved up to 8th-10th, suggesting that one of the two sources accidentally misplaced three names on the list. They are ordered here as Goddard and Talmadge in 8th and 9th place as it is more likely that they'd been at the top of the runners-up given that they were subsequently elected to fill vacancies in the 7th Congress.

District	Incumbent			This race	
District	Representative	Party	First elected	Results	Candidates
Connecticut at-large 7 seats on a general ticket	William Edmond	Federalist	1797 (special)	Incumbent re-elected.	▌ ✓ Samuel W. Dana (Federalist) 11.1%; ▌ ✓ Roger Griswold (Federalist) 10.9%; ▌ ✓ John Cotton Smith (Federalist) 10.8%; ▌ ✓ William Edmond (Federalist) 10.4%; ▌ ✓ Elizur Goodrich (Federalist) 10.2%; ▌ ✓ John Davenport (Federalist) 9.3%; ▌ ✓ Elias Perkins (Federalist) 8.6%; ▌Calvin Goddard (Federalist) 5.7%; ▌Benjamin Talmadge (Federalist) 5.3%; ▌Simeon Baldwin (Federalist) 5.2%; ▌Timothy Pitkin (Federalist) 3.8%; ▌William Moseley (Federalist) 2.7%; ▌Epaphroditus Champion (Federalist) 2.3%; Others: ▌Chauncey Goodrich (Federalist) 1.7%; ▌Jonathan Brace (Federalist) 1.0%; ▌William Hart (Democratic-Republican) 0.8%; ▌Gideon Granger (Democratic-Republican) 0.4%; ▌Sylvester Gilbert (Democratic-Republican) 0.1%
Connecticut at-large 7 seats on a general ticket	Chauncey Goodrich	Federalist	1794	Incumbent lost re-election. Federalist hold. Winner (Edmond) chose not to serve. A special election was held to replace him; see above.	
Connecticut at-large 7 seats on a general ticket	Jonathan Brace	Federalist	1798 (special)	Incumbent resigned in May 1800. Federalist hold. Winner (Smith) also elected to finish the term; see above.	
Connecticut at-large 7 seats on a general ticket	Roger Griswold	Federalist	1794	Incumbent re-elected.	
Connecticut at-large 7 seats on a general ticket	Elizur Goodrich	Federalist	1798	Incumbent re-elected. Winner (Goodrich) chose not to serve. A special election was therefore held to replace him; see above.	
Connecticut at-large 7 seats on a general ticket	John Davenport	Federalist	1798	Incumbent re-elected.	
Connecticut at-large 7 seats on a general ticket	Samuel W. Dana	Federalist	1796	Incumbent re-elected.	

== Delaware ==
District	Incumbent	Party	First elected	Result	Candidates
Delaware at-large	James A. Bayard	Federalist	1796	Incumbent re-elected.	▌ ✓ James A. Bayard (Federalist) 53.4%; ▌John Patten (Democratic-Republican) 46.6%

== Georgia ==
District	Incumbent	Party	First elected	Result	Candidates
Georgia at-large 2 seats on a general ticket	James Jones	Federalist	1798	Incumbent re-elected to a different party. Democratic-Republican gain.	▌ ✓ James Jones (Democratic-Republican) 47.9%; ▌ ✓ Benjamin Taliaferro (Democratic-Republican) 42.1%; ▌Francis Willis (Democratic-Republican) 10.0%
Georgia at-large 2 seats on a general ticket	Benjamin Taliaferro	Federalist	1798	Incumbent re-elected to a different party. Democratic-Republican gain.	▌ ✓ James Jones (Democratic-Republican) 47.9%; ▌ ✓ Benjamin Taliaferro (Democratic-Republican) 42.1%; ▌Francis Willis (Democratic-Republican) 10.0%

== Kentucky ==
District	Incumbent	Party	First elected	Result	Candidates
Kentucky 1 "Southern district"	Thomas T. Davis	Democratic- Republican	1797	Incumbent re-elected.	▌ ✓ Thomas T. Davis (Democratic-Republican) 78.8%; ▌John Pope (Democratic-Republican) 21.2%
Kentucky 2 "Northern district"	John Fowler	Democratic- Republican	1797	Incumbent re-elected.	▌ ✓ John Fowler (Democratic-Republican) 67.9%; ▌William Garrard (Unknown) 19.4%; ▌Philemon Thomas (Democratic-Republican) 12.8%

== Maryland ==
District	Incumbent	Party	First elected	Result	Candidates
Maryland 1	George Dent	Federalist	1792	Incumbent retired. Federalist hold.	▌ ✓ John Campbell (Federalist) 76.6%; ▌Frances Digges (Democratic-Republican) 23.4%
Maryland 2	John C. Thomas	Federalist	1798	Incumbent lost re-election. Democratic-Republican gain.	▌ ✓ Richard Sprigg Jr. (Democratic-Republican) 65.0%; ▌John C. Thomas (Federalist) 35.0%
Maryland 3	William Craik	Federalist	1796 (special)	Incumbent retired. Federalist hold	▌ ✓ Thomas Plater (Federalist) 53.1%; ▌Patrick Magruder (Democratic-Republican) 46.9%
Maryland 4	George Baer Jr.	Federalist	1796	Incumbent retired. Democratic-Republican gain.	▌ ✓ Daniel Hiester (Democratic-Republican) 57.4%; ▌Eli Williams (Federalist) 42.6%
Maryland 5	Samuel Smith	Democratic- Republican	1792	Incumbent re-elected.	▌ ✓ Samuel Smith (Note: Source does not give numbers of votes or has incomplete data) (Democratic-Republican); ▌Charles Ridgely (Federalist)
Maryland 6	Gabriel Christie	Democratic- Republican	1792; 1794 (lost); 1798	Incumbent retired. Democratic-Republican hold.	▌ ✓ John Archer (Democratic-Republican) 95.7%; ▌John Carlisle (Federalist) 3.9%; ▌Philip Thomas (Federalist) 0.4%
Maryland 7	Joseph H. Nicholson	Democratic- Republican	1798 (special)	Incumbent re-elected.	▌ ✓ Joseph H. Nicholson (Democratic-Republican) 99.7%; ▌Solomon Jones (Unknown) 0.3%
Maryland 8	John Dennis	Federalist	1796	Incumbent re-elected.	▌ ✓ John Dennis (Federalist) 89.4%; ▌William Polk (Democratic-Republican) 10.6%

== Massachusetts ==
Massachusetts law required a majority for election, which was not met in the 1st and 6th districts, necessitating a second trial.

District	Incumbent			This race	
District	Representative	Party	First elected	Results	Candidates
Massachusetts 1 "1st Western district"	Theodore Sedgwick	Federalist	1798	Incumbent retired. Democratic-Republican gain.	First ballot (November 3, 1800): ▌John Bacon (Democratic-Republican) 49.3%; ▌Ephraim Williams (Federalist) 49.1%; Scattering 1.6%; Second ballot (March 9, 1801): ▌ ✓ John Bacon (Democratic-Republican) 59.0%; ▌Ephraim Williams (Federalist) 41.0%
Massachusetts 2 "2nd Western district"	William Shepard	Federalist	1796	Incumbent re-elected.	▌ ✓ William Shepard (Federalist) 73.4%; ▌William Lyman (Democratic-Republican) 12.9%; Scattering 13.8%
Massachusetts 3 "3rd Western district"	Samuel Lyman	Federalist	1794	Incumbent retired. Federalist hold. Winner resigned November 6, 1800, causing a special election; see above.	▌ ✓ Ebenezer Mattoon (Federalist) 75.9%; ▌Thomas Dwight (Democratic-Republican) 14.6%; ▌Daniel Bigelow (Unknown) 4.9%; Scattering 4.6%
Massachusetts 4 "4th Western district"	Dwight Foster	Federalist	1793	Incumbent resigned June 6, 1800, when elected U.S. Senator. Democratic-Republican gain. Winner also elected to finish the term; see above.	▌ ✓ Levi Lincoln Sr. (Democratic-Republican) 52.8%; ▌Jabez Upham (Federalist) 41.5%; ▌Salem Towne (Federalist) 3.8%; ▌Seth Hastings (Federalist) 1.9%
Massachusetts 5 "1st Southern district"	Lemuel Williams	Federalist	1798	Incumbent re-elected.	▌ ✓ Lemuel Williams (Federalist) 61.9%; ▌Isaiah L. Green (Democratic-Republican) 26.6%; ▌Isaiah Coffin (Democratic-Republican) 11.5%
Massachusetts 6 "2nd Southern district"	John Reed Sr.	Federalist	1794	Incumbent retired. Democratic-Republican gain.	First ballot (November 3, 1800): ▌Nahum Mitchell (Federalist) 36.2%; ▌Josiah Smith (Democratic-Republican) 32.7%; ▌Samuel Niles (Democratic-Republican) 8.9%; ▌Benjamin Whiteman (Federalist) 6.9%; ▌Nathaniel Goodwin (Federalist) 5.9%; ▌Daniel Snow (Democratic-Republican) 3.6%; Scattering 5.9%; Second ballot (March 9, 1801): ▌ ✓ Josiah Smith (Democratic-Republican) 50.7%; ▌Nahum Mitchell (Federalist) 45.4%; ▌Samuel Niles (Democratic-Republican) 3.9%
Massachusetts 7 "3rd Southern district"	Phanuel Bishop	Democratic- Republican	1798	Incumbent re-elected.	▌ ✓ Phanuel Bishop (Democratic-Republican) 57.6%; ▌Elisha May (Federalist) 25.7%; ▌Stephen Bullock (Democratic-Republican) 9.9%; ▌Laban Wheaton (Federalist) 6.9%
Massachusetts 8 "1st Middle district"	Harrison Gray Otis	Federalist	1796	Incumbent retired. Democratic-Republican gain.	▌ ✓ William Eustis (Democratic-Republican) 52.9%; ▌Josiah Quincy (Federalist) 47.1%
Massachusetts 9 "2nd Middle district"	Joseph Bradley Varnum	Democratic- Republican	1794	Incumbent re-elected.	▌ ✓ Joseph Bradley Varnum (Democratic-Republican) 71.8%; ▌Timothy Bigelow (Federalist) 27.2%; Others 1.0%
Massachusetts 10 "3rd Middle district"	Samuel Sewall	Federalist	1796 (special)	Incumbent resigned January 10, 1800, to become Justice of the Massachusetts Supreme Court. Federalist hold. Winner also elected to finish the term; see above.	▌ ✓ Nathan Read (Federalist) 55.0%; ▌Jacob Crowninshield (Democratic-Republican) 44.0%
Massachusetts 11 "4th Middle district"	Bailey Bartlett	Federalist	1797 (special)	Incumbent retired. Federalist hold.	▌ ✓ Manasseh Cutler (Federalist) 75.5%; ▌Thomas Kitteridge (Democratic-Republican) 21.4%; Others 3.1%
Massachusetts 12 "1st Eastern district" (District of Maine)	Silas Lee	Federalist	1798	Incumbent re-elected.	▌ ✓ Silas Lee (Federalist) 50.8%; ▌Henry Dearborn (Democratic-Republican) 45.6%; Scattering 3.6%
Massachusetts 13 "2nd Eastern district" (District of Maine)	Peleg Wadsworth	Federalist	1792	Incumbent re-elected.	▌ ✓ Peleg Wadsworth (Federalist) 76.8%; ▌John Chandler (Democratic-Republican) 14.1%; ▌Stephen Longfellow (Federalist); Scattering 4.7%
Massachusetts 14 "3rd Eastern district" (District of Maine)	George Thatcher	Federalist	1788	Incumbent re-elected. Winner declined to serve, causing a special election; see above.	▌ ✓ George Thatcher (Federalist) 61.8%; ▌Richard Cutts (Democratic-Republican) 38.2%

== Mississippi Territory ==
See Non-voting delegates, below.

== New Hampshire ==
District	Incumbent	Party	First elected	Result	Candidates
New Hampshire at-large 4 seats on a general ticket	James Sheafe	Federalist	1799 (special)	Incumbent retired. Federalist hold.	▌ ✓ Abiel Foster (Federalist) 19.3%; ▌ ✓ Samuel Tenney (Federalist) 17.7%; ▌ ✓ George B. Upham (Federalist) 16.5%; ▌ ✓ Joseph Peirce (Federalist) 14.9%; ▌Nahum Parker (Democratic-Republican) 6.3%; ▌John Goddard (Democratic-Republican) 5.5%; ▌Joseph Badger (Democratic-Republican) 4.9%; ▌Ezra Bartlett (Democratic-Republican) 4.1%; ▌Michael McClary (Democratic-Republican) 2.5%; ▌Thomas Cogswell (Democratic-Republican) 1.7%; Scattering 6.7%
New Hampshire at-large 4 seats on a general ticket	Jonathan Freeman	Federalist	1796	Incumbent retired. Federalist hold.	▌ ✓ Abiel Foster (Federalist) 19.3%; ▌ ✓ Samuel Tenney (Federalist) 17.7%; ▌ ✓ George B. Upham (Federalist) 16.5%; ▌ ✓ Joseph Peirce (Federalist) 14.9%; ▌Nahum Parker (Democratic-Republican) 6.3%; ▌John Goddard (Democratic-Republican) 5.5%; ▌Joseph Badger (Democratic-Republican) 4.9%; ▌Ezra Bartlett (Democratic-Republican) 4.1%; ▌Michael McClary (Democratic-Republican) 2.5%; ▌Thomas Cogswell (Democratic-Republican) 1.7%; Scattering 6.7%
New Hampshire at-large 4 seats on a general ticket	William Gordon	Federalist	1796	Incumbent resigned June 12, 1800, to become state attorney general. Federalist hold. Winner (Samuel Tenney) also elected to finish current term; see above.	▌ ✓ Abiel Foster (Federalist) 19.3%; ▌ ✓ Samuel Tenney (Federalist) 17.7%; ▌ ✓ George B. Upham (Federalist) 16.5%; ▌ ✓ Joseph Peirce (Federalist) 14.9%; ▌Nahum Parker (Democratic-Republican) 6.3%; ▌John Goddard (Democratic-Republican) 5.5%; ▌Joseph Badger (Democratic-Republican) 4.9%; ▌Ezra Bartlett (Democratic-Republican) 4.1%; ▌Michael McClary (Democratic-Republican) 2.5%; ▌Thomas Cogswell (Democratic-Republican) 1.7%; Scattering 6.7%
New Hampshire at-large 4 seats on a general ticket	Abiel Foster	Federalist	1794	Incumbent re-elected.	▌ ✓ Abiel Foster (Federalist) 19.3%; ▌ ✓ Samuel Tenney (Federalist) 17.7%; ▌ ✓ George B. Upham (Federalist) 16.5%; ▌ ✓ Joseph Peirce (Federalist) 14.9%; ▌Nahum Parker (Democratic-Republican) 6.3%; ▌John Goddard (Democratic-Republican) 5.5%; ▌Joseph Badger (Democratic-Republican) 4.9%; ▌Ezra Bartlett (Democratic-Republican) 4.1%; ▌Michael McClary (Democratic-Republican) 2.5%; ▌Thomas Cogswell (Democratic-Republican) 1.7%; Scattering 6.7%

== New Jersey ==
In 1800, New Jersey returned to its traditional at-large district, continued to use this system to select representatives until it was abolished in 1842, with a single exception in 1813.

District	Incumbent	Party	First elected	Result	Candidates
New Jersey at-large 5 seats on a general ticket	John Condit; Redistricted from the 1st district	Democratic- Republican	1798	Incumbent re-elected.	▌ ✓ James Mott (Democratic-Republican) 10.3%; ▌ ✓ Ebenezer Elmer (Democratic-Republican) 10.2%; ▌ ✓ John Condit (Democratic-Republican) 10.2%; ▌ ✓ William Helms (Democratic-Republican) 10.2%; ▌ ✓ Henry Southard (Democratic-Republican) 10.1%; ▌Aaron Ogden (Federalist) 9.9%; ▌Peter DeVroom (Federalist) 9.8%; ▌James H. Imlay (Federalist) 9.8%; ▌Franklin Davenport (Federalist) 9.8%; ▌William Coxe (Federalist) 9.8%
New Jersey at-large 5 seats on a general ticket	Aaron Kitchell; Redistricted from the 2nd district	Democratic- Republican	1798	Incumbent retired. Democratic-Republican hold.	▌ ✓ James Mott (Democratic-Republican) 10.3%; ▌ ✓ Ebenezer Elmer (Democratic-Republican) 10.2%; ▌ ✓ John Condit (Democratic-Republican) 10.2%; ▌ ✓ William Helms (Democratic-Republican) 10.2%; ▌ ✓ Henry Southard (Democratic-Republican) 10.1%; ▌Aaron Ogden (Federalist) 9.9%; ▌Peter DeVroom (Federalist) 9.8%; ▌James H. Imlay (Federalist) 9.8%; ▌Franklin Davenport (Federalist) 9.8%; ▌William Coxe (Federalist) 9.8%
New Jersey at-large 5 seats on a general ticket	James Linn; Redistricted from the 3rd district	Democratic- Republican	1798	Incumbent retired. Democratic-Republican hold.	▌ ✓ James Mott (Democratic-Republican) 10.3%; ▌ ✓ Ebenezer Elmer (Democratic-Republican) 10.2%; ▌ ✓ John Condit (Democratic-Republican) 10.2%; ▌ ✓ William Helms (Democratic-Republican) 10.2%; ▌ ✓ Henry Southard (Democratic-Republican) 10.1%; ▌Aaron Ogden (Federalist) 9.9%; ▌Peter DeVroom (Federalist) 9.8%; ▌James H. Imlay (Federalist) 9.8%; ▌Franklin Davenport (Federalist) 9.8%; ▌William Coxe (Federalist) 9.8%
New Jersey at-large 5 seats on a general ticket	James H. Imlay; Redistricted from the 4th district	Federalist	1797	Incumbent lost re-election. Democratic-Republican gain.	▌ ✓ James Mott (Democratic-Republican) 10.3%; ▌ ✓ Ebenezer Elmer (Democratic-Republican) 10.2%; ▌ ✓ John Condit (Democratic-Republican) 10.2%; ▌ ✓ William Helms (Democratic-Republican) 10.2%; ▌ ✓ Henry Southard (Democratic-Republican) 10.1%; ▌Aaron Ogden (Federalist) 9.9%; ▌Peter DeVroom (Federalist) 9.8%; ▌James H. Imlay (Federalist) 9.8%; ▌Franklin Davenport (Federalist) 9.8%; ▌William Coxe (Federalist) 9.8%
New Jersey at-large 5 seats on a general ticket	Franklin Davenport; Redistricted from the 5th district	Federalist	1798	Incumbent lost re-election. Democratic-Republican gain.	▌ ✓ James Mott (Democratic-Republican) 10.3%; ▌ ✓ Ebenezer Elmer (Democratic-Republican) 10.2%; ▌ ✓ John Condit (Democratic-Republican) 10.2%; ▌ ✓ William Helms (Democratic-Republican) 10.2%; ▌ ✓ Henry Southard (Democratic-Republican) 10.1%; ▌Aaron Ogden (Federalist) 9.9%; ▌Peter DeVroom (Federalist) 9.8%; ▌James H. Imlay (Federalist) 9.8%; ▌Franklin Davenport (Federalist) 9.8%; ▌William Coxe (Federalist) 9.8%

== New York ==
District	Incumbent	Party	First elected	Result	Candidates
New York 1	John Smith	Democratic- Republican	1799 (special)	Incumbent re-elected.	▌ ✓ John Smith (Democratic-Republican) 56.0%; ▌Silas Wood (Federalist) 44.0%
New York 2	Edward Livingston	Democratic- Republican	1794	Incumbent retired. Democratic-Republican hold.	▌ ✓ Samuel L. Mitchill (Democratic-Republican) 51.0%; ▌Jacob Morton (Federalist) 49.0%
New York 3	Philip Van Cortlandt	Democratic- Republican	1793	Incumbent re-elected.	▌ ✓ Philip Van Cortlandt (Democratic-Republican) 59.7%; ▌Samuel Bayard (Federalist) 40.3%
New York 4	Lucas Elmendorf	Democratic- Republican	1796	Incumbent re-elected.	▌ ✓ Lucas Elmendorf (Democratic-Republican) 60.0%; ▌John Hathorn (Democratic-Republican) 36.8%; ▌Leonard Bronk (Federalist) 3.2%
New York 5	Theodorus Bailey	Democratic- Republican	1798	Incumbent retired. Democratic-Republican hold.	▌ ✓ Thomas Tillotson (Democratic-Republican) 61.6%; ▌David Brooks (Federalist) 38.4%
New York 6	John Bird	Federalist	1798	Incumbent re-elected.	▌ ✓ John Bird (Federalist) 53.4%; ▌Henry W. Livingston (Democratic-Republican) 45.5%; ▌John Woodworth (Democratic-Republican) 1.1%
New York 7	John Thompson	Democratic- Republican	1798	Incumbent lost re-election. Democratic-Republican hold.	▌ ✓ David Thomas (Democratic-Republican) 50.8%; ▌John Williams (Federalist) 47.8%; ▌John Thompson (Democratic-Republican) 1.3%
New York 8	Henry Glen	Federalist	1793	Incumbent lost re-election. Federalist hold.	▌ ✓ Killian K. Van Rensselaer (Federalist) 50.3%; ▌George Tiffany (Democratic-Republican) 40.8%; ▌Henry Glen (Federalist) 8.9%
New York 9	Jonas Platt	Federalist	1798	Incumbent retired. Federalist hold.	▌ ✓ Benjamin Walker (Federalist) 64.3%; ▌Jacob Eaker (Democratic-Republican) 34.5%; Scattering 1.2%
New York 10	William Cooper	Federalist	1798	Incumbent retired. Federalist hold.	▌ ✓ Thomas Morris (Federalist) 54.3%; ▌William Stuart (Democratic-Republican) 39.6%; ▌John Paterson (Democratic-Republican) 4.4%; Scattering 1.8%

== North Carolina ==
District	Incumbent	Party	First elected	Result	Candidates
North Carolina 1	Joseph Dickson	Federalist	1798	Incumbent lost re-election. Democratic-Republican gain.	▌ ✓ James Holland (Democratic-Republican) 60.9%; ▌Joseph Dickson (Federalist) 38.1%
North Carolina 2	Archibald Henderson	Federalist	1798	Incumbent re-elected.	▌ ✓ Archibald Henderson (Federalist) 49.3%; ▌Musendine Matthews (Federalist) 29.0%; ▌Matthew Locke (Democratic-Republican) 21.7%
North Carolina 3	Robert Williams	Democratic- Republican	1796	Incumbent re-elected.	▌ ✓ Robert Williams (Democratic-Republican) 75.1%; ▌John Hamilton (Federalist) 24.9%
North Carolina 4	Richard Stanford	Democratic- Republican	1796	Incumbent re-elected.	▌ ✓ Richard Stanford (Democratic-Republican) 61.6%; ▌William Strudwick (Federalist) 38.4%
North Carolina 5	Nathaniel Macon	Democratic- Republican	1791	Incumbent re-elected.	▌ ✓ Nathaniel Macon (Democratic-Republican) 97.4%; Scattering 2.6%
North Carolina 6	William H. Hill	Federalist	1798	Incumbent re-elected.	▌ ✓ William H. Hill (Federalist) 65.2%; ▌James Gillespie (Democratic-Republican) 34.8%
North Carolina 7	William Barry Grove	Federalist	1791	Incumbent re-elected.	▌ ✓ William Barry Grove (Federalist) 77.8%; ▌Samuel D. Purviance (Democratic-Republican) 22.2%
North Carolina 8	David Stone	Federalist	1798	Incumbent re-elected. Winner was also elected U.S. Senator, and chose not to serve in the House in the next congress. A special election was held August 6, 1801; see above.	▌ ✓ David Stone (Federalist); ▌John H. Jaycocks (Federalist); ▌John White (Unknown)
North Carolina 9	Willis Alston	Democratic- Republican	1798	Incumbent re-elected.	▌ ✓ Willis Alston (Democratic-Republican) 58.1%; ▌Thomas Blount (Democratic-Republican) 41.9%
North Carolina 10	Richard Dobbs Spaight	Democratic- Republican	1798	Incumbent lost re-election. Federalist gain.	▌ ✓ John Stanly (Federalist) 60.1%; ▌Richard Dobbs Spaight (Democratic-Republican) 39.9%

== Northwest Territory ==
See Non-voting delegates, below.

== Pennsylvania ==
District	Incumbent	Party	First elected	Result	Candidates
Pennsylvania 1	Robert Waln	Federalist	1798 (special)	Incumbent retired. Democratic-Republican gain.	▌ ✓ William Jones (Democratic-Republican) 50.2%; ▌Francis Gurney (Federalist) 49.8%
Pennsylvania 2	Michael Leib	Democratic- Republican	1798	Incumbent re-elected.	▌ ✓ Michael Leib (Democratic-Republican) 77.8%; ▌John Lardner (Federalist) 22.2%
Pennsylvania 3	Richard Thomas	Federalist	1794	Incumbent retired. Federalist hold.	▌ ✓ Joseph Hemphill (Federalist) 53.3%; ▌Joseph Shallcroft (Democratic-Republican) 46.7%
Pennsylvania 4 Plural district with 2 seats	Peter Muhlenberg	Democratic- Republican	1798	Incumbent re-elected. Winner was elected U.S. Senator February 19, 1801, causing a special election; see above.	▌ ✓ Peter Muhlenberg (Democratic-Republican) 34.4%; ▌ ✓ Robert Brown (Democratic-Republican) 34.4%; ▌Cawallader C. Evans (Federalist) 15.6%; ▌John Arndt (Federalist) 15.5%
Pennsylvania 4 Plural district with 2 seats	Robert Brown	Democratic- Republican	1798 (special)	Incumbent re-elected.	▌ ✓ Peter Muhlenberg (Democratic-Republican) 34.4%; ▌ ✓ Robert Brown (Democratic-Republican) 34.4%; ▌Cawallader C. Evans (Federalist) 15.6%; ▌John Arndt (Federalist) 15.5%
Pennsylvania 5	Joseph Hiester	Democratic- Republican	1797 (special)	Incumbent re-elected.	▌ ✓ Joseph Hiester (Democratic-Republican) 83.2%; ▌Roswell Wells (Federalist) 16.8%
Pennsylvania 6	John A. Hanna	Democratic- Republican	1796	Incumbent re-elected.	▌ ✓ John A. Hanna (Democratic-Republican) 74.6%; ▌Samuel Maclay (Federalist) 25.4%
Pennsylvania 7	John W. Kittera	Federalist	1791	Incumbent retired. Federalist hold.	▌ ✓ Thomas Boude (Federalist) 54.1%; ▌John Whitehill (Democratic-Republican) 45.9%
Pennsylvania 8	Thomas Hartley	Federalist	1788	Incumbent retired. Democratic-Republican gain. Winner was later elected to finish the current term; see above.	▌ ✓ John Stewart (Democratic-Republican) 54.8%; ▌John Eddie (Federalist) 45.2%
Pennsylvania 9	Andrew Gregg	Democratic- Republican	1791	Incumbent re-elected.	▌ ✓ Andrew Gregg (Democratic-Republican) 72.6%; ▌David Mitchell (Federalist) 27.4%
Pennsylvania 10	Henry Woods	Federalist	1798	Incumbent re-elected.	▌ ✓ Henry Woods (Federalist) 53.6%; ▌David Bard (Democratic-Republican) 46.4%
Pennsylvania 11	John Smilie	Democratic- Republican	1792; 1798	Incumbent re-elected.	▌ ✓ John Smilie (Democratic-Republican) 100%
Pennsylvania 12	Albert Gallatin	Democratic- Republican	1794	Incumbent re-elected. Winner was appointed Treasury Secretary May 14, 1801, causing a special election; see above.	▌ ✓ Albert Gallatin (Democratic-Republican) 72.9%; ▌Presley Neville (Federalist) 27.1%

== Rhode Island ==
Rhode Island switched to a general ticket for its two seats, instead of electing each one separately. Only one candidate received a majority in the 1800 election, requiring an 1801 run-off election to choose a Representative for the second seat.

District	Incumbent	Party	First elected	Result	Candidates (Note: Only candidates with at least 1% of the vote listed)
Rhode Island at-large 2 seats on a general ticket	John Brown	Federalist	1798	Incumbent lost re-election. Democratic-Republican gain.	First ballot (August 26, 1800): ▌ ✓ Thomas Tillinghast (Democratic-Republican) 40.2%; ▌Joseph Stanton Jr. (Democratic-Republican) 24.0%; ▌Richard Jackson Jr. (Federalist) 19.9%; ▌Asher Robbins (Federalist) 12.9%; ▌John Brown (Federalist) 2.2%; Second ballot (April 15, 1801): ▌ ✓ Joseph Stanton Jr. (Democratic-Republican) 61.4%; ▌Thomas Noyes (Federalist) 38.6%
Rhode Island at-large 2 seats on a general ticket	Christopher G. Champlin	Federalist	1796	Incumbent retired. Democratic-Republican gain.	First ballot (August 26, 1800): ▌ ✓ Thomas Tillinghast (Democratic-Republican) 40.2%; ▌Joseph Stanton Jr. (Democratic-Republican) 24.0%; ▌Richard Jackson Jr. (Federalist) 19.9%; ▌Asher Robbins (Federalist) 12.9%; ▌John Brown (Federalist) 2.2%; Second ballot (April 15, 1801): ▌ ✓ Joseph Stanton Jr. (Democratic-Republican) 61.4%; ▌Thomas Noyes (Federalist) 38.6%

== South Carolina ==
District	Incumbent	Party	First elected	Result	Candidates
South Carolina 1 "Charleston District"	Thomas Pinckney	Federalist	1797 (special)	Incumbent retired. Federalist hold.	▌ ✓ Thomas Lowndes (Federalist) 87.0% (Note: Percent based on incomplete records); ▌Robert Simons (Democratic-Republican) 13.0%
South Carolina 2 "Beaufort District"	John Rutledge Jr.	Federalist	1796	Incumbent re-elected.	▌ ✓ John Rutledge Jr. (Federalist) 60.3%; ▌Charles J. Colcock (Democratic-Republican) 39.7%
South Carolina 3 "Georgetown District"	Benjamin Huger	Federalist	1798	Incumbent re-elected.	▌ ✓ Benjamin Huger (Federalist) 54.5%; ▌Lemuel Benton (Democratic-Republican) 45.1%; ▌Tristam Thomas (Unknown) 0.4%
South Carolina 4 "Camden District"	Thomas Sumter	Democratic- Republican	1796	Incumbent re-elected.	▌ ✓ Thomas Sumter (Democratic-Republican) 63.3%; ▌Richard Winn (Federalist) 32.6%; ▌William Bracey (Federalist) 4.1%
South Carolina 5 "Ninety-Six District"	Robert Goodloe Harper	Federalist	1794	Incumbent retired. Democratic-Republican gain.	▌ ✓ William Butler Sr. (Democratic-Republican) 63.9%; ▌John Nicholls (Federalist) 31.0%; ▌Charles Goodwyn (Federalist) 5.1%
South Carolina 6 "Washington District"	Abraham Nott	Federalist	1798	Incumbent retired. Democratic-Republican gain.	▌ ✓ Thomas Moore (Democratic-Republican) 50.7%; ▌William Smith (Democratic-Republican) 49.3%

== Tennessee ==
District	Incumbent	Party	First elected	Result	Candidates
Tennessee at-large	William C. C. Claiborne	Democratic- Republican	1797	Incumbent re-elected.	▌ ✓ William C. C. Claiborne (Democratic-Republican) 86.3%; ▌John Rhea (Democratic-Republican) 13.6%

Claiborne did not serve in the 7th Congress as he was appointed Governor of Mississippi Territory and was replaced in a special election by William Dickson (Democratic-Republican)

== Vermont ==
Vermont law required a candidate to win a majority to take office, necessitating a run-off election in the 2nd (Eastern) district.

District	Incumbent			This race	
District	Representative	Party	First elected	Results	Candidates
Vermont 1 "Western district"	Matthew Lyon	Democratic- Republican	1797	Incumbent retired. Democratic-Republican hold.	▌ ✓ Israel Smith (Democratic-Republican) 63.5%; ▌Daniel Chipman (Federalist) 34.8%; ▌Amos March (Unknown) 1.8%
Vermont 2 "Eastern district"	Lewis R. Morris	Federalist	1797 (special)	Incumbent re-elected.	First ballot (September 2, 1800): ▌Lewis R. Morris (Federalist) 24.9%; ▌Nathaniel Niles (Democratic-Republican) 24.7%; ▌Amasa Paine (Federalist) 15.6%; ▌Stephen Jacobs (Federalist) 11.3%; ▌William Chamberlain (Federalist) 10.6%; ▌Stephen R. Bradley (Democratic-Republican) 7.3%; ▌Lot Hall (Federalist) 5.5%; Second ballot (December 2, 1800): ▌ ✓ Lewis R. Morris (Federalist) 55.7%; ▌Nathaniel Niles (Democratic-Republican) 25.4%; ▌Amasa Paine (Federalist) 12.4%; ▌William Chamberlain (Federalist) 4.5%; Others 2.0%

== Virginia ==
District	Incumbent	Party	First elected	Result	Candidates
Virginia 1	Robert Page	Federalist	1799	Incumbent retired. Democratic-Republican gain.	▌ ✓ John Smith (Democratic-Republican) 59.3%; ▌Philip C. Pendleton (Federalist) 40.7%
Virginia 2	David Holmes	Democratic-Republican	1797	Incumbent re-elected.	▌ ✓ David Holmes (Democratic-Republican); ▌Alexander Sinclair (Federalist)
Virginia 3	George Jackson	Democratic-Republican	1799	Incumbent re-elected.	▌ ✓ George Jackson (Democratic-Republican); ▌Jonathan J. Jacobs (Federalist); ▌Skidmore (Note: Source did not give full name) (Federalist)
Virginia 4	Abram Trigg	Democratic-Republican	1797	Incumbent re-elected.	▌ ✓ Abram Trigg (Democratic-Republican) 100%
Virginia 5	John J. Trigg	Democratic-Republican	1797	Incumbent re-elected.	▌ ✓ John J. Trigg (Democratic-Republican) 100%
Virginia 6	Matthew Clay	Democratic-Republican	1797	Incumbent re-elected.	▌ ✓ Matthew Clay (Democratic-Republican) 100%
Virginia 7	John Randolph	Democratic-Republican	1799	Incumbent re-elected.	▌ ✓ John Randolph (Democratic-Republican)
Virginia 8	Samuel Goode	Democratic-Republican	1799	Unknown if incumbent retired or lost re-election. Democratic-Republican hold.	▌ ✓ Thomas Claiborne (Democratic-Republican) 100%
Virginia 9	Joseph Eggleston	Democratic-Republican	1798 (special)	Unknown if incumbent retired or lost re-election. Democratic-Republican hold.	▌ ✓ William B. Giles (Democratic-Republican) 100%
Virginia 10	Edwin Gray	Democratic-Republican	1799	Incumbent re-elected.	▌ ✓ Edwin Gray (Democratic-Republican); ▌Nicholas Faulcon (Democratic-Republican)
Virginia 11	Josiah Parker	Federalist	1789	Incumbent lost re-election. Democratic-Republican gain.	▌ ✓ Thomas Newton Jr. (Democratic-Republican) 93.6%; ▌John Niveson (Federalist) 5.7%; ▌Josiah Parker (Federalist) 0.7%
Virginia 12	Thomas Evans	Federalist	1797	Incumbent retired. Federalist hold.	▌ ✓ John Stratton (Federalist); ▌John Page (Democratic-Republican)
Virginia 13	Littleton Waller Tazewell	Democratic-Republican	1800 (special)	Incumbent retired. Democratic-Republican hold.	▌ ✓ John Clopton (Democratic-Republican); ▌Samuel Tyler (Democratic-Republican)
Virginia 14	Samuel J. Cabell	Democratic-Republican	1795	Incumbent re-elected.	▌ ✓ Samuel J. Cabell (Democratic-Republican) 100%
Virginia 15	John Dawson	Democratic-Republican	1797	Incumbent re-elected.	▌ ✓ John Dawson (Democratic-Republican)
Virginia 16	Anthony New	Democratic-Republican	1793	Incumbent re-elected.	▌ ✓ Anthony New (Democratic-Republican); ▌Carter Braxton (Unknown); ▌James M. Garnett (Democratic-Republican); Others: ▌Tunstall Banks (Unknown); ▌Andrew Monroe (Unknown); ▌Richard Banks (Unknown); ▌Archibald Petetrie (Unknown)
Virginia 17	Leven Powell	Federalist	1799	Incumbent lost re-election. Democratic-Republican gain.	▌ ✓ Richard Brent (Democratic-Republican); ▌Leven Powell (Federalist); ▌Joseph Lane (Unknown); ▌Samuel Clapham (Unknown)
Virginia 18	John Nicholas	Democratic-Republican	1793	Incumbent retired. Democratic-Republican hold.	▌ ✓ Philip R. Thompson (Democratic-Republican); ▌John Blackwell (Federalist)
Virginia 19	Henry Lee	Federalist	1799	Incumbent retired. Democratic-Republican gain.	▌ ✓ John Taliaferro (Democratic-Republican) 63.0%; ▌John Taylor (Federalist) 37.0%

== Non-voting delegates ==
District	Incumbent			This race	
District	Delegate	Party	First elected	Results	Candidates
Mississippi Territory at-large	None (new seat)			New seat. New delegate elected on an unknown date. Democratic-Republican gain.	▌ ✓ Narsworthy Hunter (Democratic-Republican); [data missing]
Northwest Territory at-large	William Henry Harrison	None	1799	Incumbent resigned to become Governor of Indiana Territory. New member elected November 6, 1800, by the territorial legislature and seated November 24, 1800. Federalist gain. Successor was not a candidate to finish the current next term; see above.	▌ ✓ Paul Fearing (Federalist); [data missing]

== See also ==
- 1800 United States elections
  - List of United States House of Representatives elections (1789–1822)
  - 1800–01 United States Senate elections
  - 1800 United States presidential election
- 6th United States Congress
- 7th United States Congress

== Bibliography ==
- "A New Nation Votes: American Election Returns 1787-1825". Tufts Digital Library, Tufts University. Archived from the original on January 29, 2015.
- Dubin, Michael J. (March 1, 1998). United States Congressional Elections, 1788-1997: The Official Results of the Elections of the 1st Through 105th Congresses. McFarland and Company. ISBN 978-0786402830.
- Martis, Kenneth C. (January 1, 1989). The Historical Atlas of Political Parties in the United States Congress, 1789-1989. Macmillan Publishing Company. ISBN 978-0029201701.
- "Party Divisions of the House of Representatives* 1789–Present". Office of the Historian, United States House of Representatives.
- Mapping Early American Elections project team (2019). "Mapping Early American Elections". Roy Rosenzweig Center for History and New Media, George Mason University.
