= List of United States representatives in the 7th Congress =

This is a complete list of United States representatives during the 7th United States Congress listed by seniority. For the most part, representatives are ranked by the beginning of their terms in office.

As an historical article, the districts and party affiliations listed reflect those during the 7th Congress (March 4, 1801 – March 3, 1803). Seats and party affiliations on similar lists for other congresses will be different for certain members.

This article describes the criteria for seniority in the House of Representatives and sets out the list of members by seniority. It is prepared on the basis of the interpretation of seniority applied to the House of Representatives in the current congress. In the absence of information to the contrary, it is presumed that the twenty-first-century practice is identical to the seniority customs used during the 7th Congress.

== House seniority ==
Seniority in the House, for representatives with unbroken service, depends on the date on which the members first term began. That date is either the start of the Congress (4 March in odd numbered years, for the era up to and including the 73rd Congress starting in 1933) or the date of a special election during the Congress. Since many members start serving on the same day as others, ranking between them is based on alphabetical order by the last name of the representative.

Representatives in early congresses were often elected after the legal start of the Congress. Such representatives are attributed with unbroken seniority, from the legal start of the congressional term, if they were the first person elected to a seat in a Congress. The date of the election is indicated in a note.

The seniority date is normally taken from the members entry in the Biographical Directory of the United States Congress, except where the date given is the legal start of the Congress and the actual election (for someone who was not the first person elected to the seat in that Congress) was later. The date of election is taken from United States Congressional Elections 1788-1997. In a few instances the latter work provides dates, for the start and end of terms, which correct those in the Biographical Directory.

The Biographical Directory normally uses the date of a special election, as the seniority date. However, mostly in early congresses, the date of the member taking his seat can be the one given. The date of the special election is mentioned in a note to the list below, when that date is not used as the seniority date by the Biographical Directory.

Representatives who returned to the House, after having previously served, are credited with service equal to one less than the total number of terms they served. When a representative has served a prior term of less than two terms (i.e., prior term minus one equals less than one), he is ranked above all others whose service begins on the same day.

== Leadership ==
In this Congress the only formal leader was the speaker of the House. A speakership ballot was held on December 7, 1801, and Nathaniel Macon (DR-NC) was elected.

== Standing committees ==
The House created its first standing committee, on April 13, 1789. There were four standing committees, listed in the rules initially used by the 7th Congress. In addition there was a Ways and Means Committee. The Ways and Means Committee was not formally added to the main list of standing committees, until the rules were revised on January 7, 1802. The modern Ways and Means Committee dates its foundation as a standing committee to 1802, but considers the pre-1802 panel to be its forerunner.

Committees, in this period, were appointed for a session at a time and not necessarily for every one in a Congress. The speaker appointed the members.

This list refers to the standing committees of the House in the 7th Congress, the year of establishment as a standing committee, the number of members assigned to the committee and the dates of appointment in each session, the end of the session and its chairman. Chairmen, who were re-appointed after serving in the previous Congress, are indicated by an *.

The first session was December 7, 1801 – May 3, 1802 (148 days), and the second session was December 6, 1802 – March 3, 1803 (88 days).

No.	Committee	From	Members	Appointed	Chairman
1	Claims	1794	7	December 8, 1801 – May 3, 1802	John C. Smith (F-CT)
1	Claims	1794	7	December 8, 1802 – March 3, 1803	John C. Smith (F-CT)
2	Commerce and Manufactures	1795	7	December 8, 1801 – May 3, 1802	*Samuel Smith (DR-MD)
2	Commerce and Manufactures	1795	7	December 8, 1802 – March 3, 1803	*Samuel Smith (DR-MD)
3	Elections	1789	7	December 8, 1801 – May 3, 1802	John Milledge (DR-GA)
3	Elections	1789	7	December 8, 1802 – March 3, 1803	John Bacon (DR-MA)
4	Revisal and Unfinished Business	1795	3	December 8, 1801 – May 3, 1802	John Davenport (F-CT)
4	Revisal and Unfinished Business	1795	3	December 8, 1802 – March 3, 1803	John Davenport (F-CT)
5	Ways and Means	[1794] 1802	9	December 8, 1801 – May 3, 1802	John Randolph (DR-VA)
5	Ways and Means	[1794] 1802	7	December 14, 1802 – March 3, 1803	John Randolph (DR-VA)

== List of representatives by seniority ==
A numerical rank is assigned to each of the 106 members initially elected to the 7th Congress. Other members, who were not the first person elected to a seat but who joined the House during the Congress, are not assigned a number.

Twelve representatives-elect were not sworn in, as one died and eleven resigned. The list below includes the representatives-elect (with name in italics), with the seniority they would have held if they had been sworn in.

Party designations used in this article are DR for Democratic-Republican members and F for Federalist representatives. Designations used for service in the first three congresses are (A) for Anti-Administration members and (P) for Pro-Administration representatives.

U.S. House seniority
Rank	Representative	Party	District	Seniority date	Notes
Seven consecutive terms
1	George Thatcher	F	MA-14	March 4, 1789	(P) 1789–95. Resigned as Representative-elect.
Six consecutive terms
2	Andrew Gregg	DR	PA-9	March 4, 1791	(A) 1791-95
3	William B. Grove	F	NC-7	March 4, 1791	(P) 1791–95. Last term while serving as a member of the House.
4	Nathaniel Macon	DR	NC-5	March 4, 1791	(A) 1791–95. Speaker of the House.
Six non-consecutive terms
5	William B. Giles	DR	VA-9	March 4, 1801	Previously served (A) December 7, 1790–95 and (DR) 1795-October 2, 1798, while as a member of the House. Elected to this Congress: April 22, 1801. Last term while serving as a member of the House.
Five consecutive terms
6	Anthony New	DR	VA-16	March 4, 1793	(A) 1793–95. Elected to this Congress: April 22, 1801.
7	Samuel Smith	DR	MD-5	March 4, 1793	(A) 1793-95 while as a member of the House. Elected to this Congress: April 6, 1801. Chairman: Commerce and Manufactures. Last term while serving as a member of the House until 14th Congress.
8	Philip Van Cortlandt	DR	NY-3	March 4, 1793	(A) 1793-95
9	Peleg Wadsworth	F	MA-13	March 4, 1793	(P) 1793-95
Five non-consecutive terms
10	Thomas Sumter	DR	SC-4	March 4, 1797	Previously served (A) 1789-93 while as a member of the House. Resigned, to become US Senator: December 15, 1801.
11	Abiel Foster	F	NH-al	March 4, 1795	Previously served (P) June 22, 1789-91 while as a member of the House. Last term while serving as a member of the House.
12	Daniel Hiester	DR	MD-4	March 4, 1801	Previously served (PA-A) 1789-95 and (PA-DR) 1795-July 1, 1796, while as a member of the House. Elected to this Congress: April 6, 1801.
Four consecutive terms
13	Samuel J. Cabell	DR	VA-14	March 4, 1795	Elected to this Congress: April 22, 1801. Last term while serving as a member of the House.
14	Albert Gallatin	DR	PA-12	March 4, 1795	Resigned as Representative-elect, to become Secretary of the Treasury
15	Roger Griswold	F	CT-al	March 4, 1795	
16	Joseph B. Varnum	DR	MA-9	March 4, 1795	
17	Samuel W. Dana	F	CT-al	January 3, 1797	
Four non-consecutive terms
18	Thomas Claiborne	DR	VA-8	March 4, 1801	Previously served (A) 1793-95 and (DR) 1795-99 while as a member of the House. Elected to this Congress: April 22, 1801.
19	Peter Muhlenberg	DR	PA-4	March 4, 1799	Previously served (A) 1789-91 and 1793-95 while as a member of the House.. Resigned, as Representative-elect, to become a US Senator.
20	Israel Smith	DR	VT-1	March 4, 1801	Previously served (A) October 17, 1791–95 and (DR) 1795-97 while as a member of the House. Last term while serving as a member of the House.
Three consecutive terms
21	James A. Bayard	F	DE-al	March 4, 1797	Last term while serving as a member of the House. (elected to 9th Congress but did not serve)
22	Matthew Clay	DR	VA-6	March 4, 1797	Elected to this Congress: April 22, 1801
23	Thomas T. Davis	DR	KY-1	March 4, 1797	Elected to this Congress: August 3, 1801. Last term while serving as a member of the House.
24	John Dawson	DR	VA-15	March 4, 1797	Elected to this Congress: April 22, 1801
25	John Dennis	F	MD-8	March 4, 1797	Elected to this Congress: April 6, 1801
26	Lucas C. Elmendorf	DR	NY-4	March 4, 1797	Last term while serving as a member of the House.
27	John Fowler	DR	KY-2	March 4, 1797	Elected to this Congress: August 3, 1801
28	John A. Hanna	DR	PA-6	March 4, 1797	
29	David Holmes	DR	VA-2	March 4, 1797	Elected to this Congress: April 22, 1801
30	John Rutledge, Jr.	F	SC-2	March 4, 1797	Last term while serving as a member of the House.
31	William Shepard	F	MA-2	March 4, 1797	Last term while serving as a member of the House.
32	Richard Stanford	DR	NC-4	March 4, 1797	
33	Abram Trigg	DR	VA-4	March 4, 1797	Elected to this Congress: April 22, 1801
34	John J. Trigg	DR	VA-5	March 4, 1797	Elected to this Congress: April 22, 1801
35	Robert Williams	DR	NC-3	March 4, 1797	Last term while serving as a member of the House.
36	Lewis R. Morris	F	VT-2	May 22, 1797	Last term while serving as a member of the House.
37	William Edmond	F	CT-al	November 13, 1797	Resigned as Representative-elect: c. August 1801
38	William Claiborne	DR	TN-al	November 23, 1797	Elected to this Congress: August 3–4, 1801. Resigned as Representative-elect: September 22, 1801.
39	Joseph Hiester	DR	PA-5	December 1, 1798	
40	Robert Brown	DR	PA-4	December 4, 1798	
Three non-consecutive terms
41	Richard Brent	DR	VA-17	March 4, 1801	Previously (DR) 1795-99 while as a member of the House. Elected to this Congress: April 22, 1801. Last term while serving as a member of the House.
42	John Clopton	DR	VA-13	March 4, 1801	Previously served (DR) 1795-99 while as a member of the House. Elected to this Congress: April 22, 1801.
43	George Jackson	DR	VA-3	March 4, 1799	Previously served (DR) 1795-97 while as a member of the House. Elected to this Congress: April 22, 1801. Last term while serving as a member of the House.
44	John Smilie	DR	PA-11	March 4, 1799	Previously served (A) 1793-95 while as a member of the House.
45	Richard Sprigg, Jr.	DR	MD-2	March 4, 1801	Previously served (DR) May 5, 1796–99. Elected to this Congress: April 6, 1801. Resigned on February 11, 1802, while still serving as a member of the House.
Two consecutive terms
46	Willis Alston	DR	NC-9	March 4, 1799	
47	John Bird	F	NY-6	March 4, 1799	Resigned as Representative-elect: July 25, 1801
48	Phanuel Bishop	DR	MA-7	March 4, 1799	
49	John Condit	DR	NJ-al	March 4, 1799	Last term while as a member of the House until 16th Congress.
50	John Davenport	F	CT-al	March 4, 1799	Chairman: Revisal and Unfinished Business
51	Edwin Gray	DR	VA-10	March 4, 1799	Elected to this Congress: April 22, 1801
52	Archibald Henderson	F	NC-2	March 4, 1799	Last term while serving as a member of the House.
53	William H. Hill	F	NC-6	March 4, 1799	Last term while serving as a member of the House.
54	Benjamin Huger	F	SC-3	March 4, 1799	
55	James Jones	F	GA-al	March 4, 1799	Died as Representative-elect: January 11, 1801
56	Silas Lee	F	MA-12	March 4, 1799	Resigned as Representative-elect: August 20, 1801
57	Michael Leib	DR	PA-2	March 4, 1799	
58	Joseph H. Nicholson	DR	MD-7	March 4, 1799	Elected to this Congress: April 6, 1801
59	John Randolph	DR	VA-7	March 4, 1799	Elected to this Congress: April 22, 1801. Chairman: Ways and Means.
60	David Stone	DR	NC-8	March 4, 1799	Resigned, as Representative-elect, to become a US Senator
61	Benjamin Taliaferro	DR	GA-al	March 4, 1799	(F) 1799–1801. Resigned in February 1802 while still serving as a member of the House.
62	Lemuel Williams	F	MA-5	March 4, 1799	
63	Henry Woods	F	PA-10	March 4, 1799	Last term while serving as a member of the House.
64	Elizur Goodrich	F	CT-al	September 16, 1799	Special election. Resigned as Representative-elect: March 3, 1801.
65	John Smith	DR	NY-1	February 6, 1800	
66	Nathan Read	F	MA-10	November 25, 1800	Last term while serving as a member of the House.
67	John C. Smith	F	CT-al	November 17, 1800	Chairman: Claims
68	Samuel Tenney	F	NH-al	November 18, 1800	
69	Levi Lincoln	DR	MA-4	December 15, 1800	Resigned, as Representative-elect, to become Attorney General: March 5, 1801
70	John Stewart	DR	PA-8	January 15, 1801	
71	Ebenezer Mattoon	F	MA-3	February 2, 1801	Last term while serving as a member of the House.
Two non-consecutive terms
72	James Holland	DR	NC-1	March 4, 1801	Previously served (DR) 1795-97 while as a member of the House.
73	Thomas Tillinghast	DR	RI-al	March 4, 1801	Previously served (F) November 13, 1797-99 while as a member of the House. Last term while serving as a member of the House.
One term
74	John Archer	DR	MD-6	March 4, 1801	Elected to this Congress: April 6, 1801
75	John Bacon	DR	MA-1	March 4, 1801	Elected to this Congress: March 9, 1801. Chairman: Elections (1802–03). Only term while serving as a member of the House.
76	Thomas Boude	F	PA-7	March 4, 1801	Only term while serving as a member of the House.
77	William Butler	DR	SC-5	March 4, 1801	
78	John Campbell	F	MD-1	March 4, 1801	Elected to this Congress: April 6, 1801
79	Manasseh Cutler	F	MA-11	March 4, 1801	
80	Ebenezer Elmer	DR	NJ-al	March 4, 1801	
81	William Eustis	DR	MA-8	March 4, 1801	
82	William Helms	DR	NJ-al	March 4, 1801	
83	Joseph Hemphill	F	PA-3	March 4, 1801	Only term while serving as a member of the House until 16th Congress
84	William Jones	DR	PA-1	March 4, 1801	Only term while serving as a member of the House.
85	Thomas Lowndes	F	SC-1	March 4, 1801	
86	Samuel L. Mitchill	DR	NY-2	March 4, 1801	
87	Thomas Moore	DR	SC-6	March 4, 1801	
88	Thomas Morris	F	NY-10	March 4, 1801	Only term while serving as a member of the House.
89	James Mott	DR	NJ-al	March 4, 1801	
90	Thomas Newton, Jr.	DR	VA-11	March 4, 1801	Elected to this Congress: April 22, 1801
91	Joseph Peirce	F	NH-al	March 4, 1801	Resigned in 1802 while still serving as a member of the House.
92	Elias Perkins	F	CT-al	March 4, 1801	Only term while serving as a member of the House.
93	Thomas Plater	F	MD-3	March 4, 1801	Elected to this Congress: April 6, 1801
94	John Smith	DR	VA-1	March 4, 1801	Elected to this Congress: April 22, 1801
95	Josiah Smith	DR	MA-6	March 4, 1801	Elected to this Congress: March 9, 1801. Only term while serving as a member of the House.
96	Henry Southard	DR	NJ-al	March 4, 1801	
97	John Stanly	F	NC-10	March 4, 1801	Only term while as a member of the House until 11th Congress
98	Joseph Stanton Jr.	DR	RI-al	March 4, 1801	Elected to this Congress: April 15, 1801
99	John Stratton	F	VA-12	March 4, 1801	Elected to this Congress: April 22, 1801. Only term while serving as a member of the House.
100	John Taliaferro	DR	VA-19	March 4, 1801	Elected to this Congress: April 22, 1801. Only term while serving as a member of the House until 12th Congress.
101	David Thomas	DR	NY-7	March 4, 1801	
102	Thomas Tillotson	DR	NY-5	March 4, 1801	Resigned as Representative-elect: August 10, 1801
103	Philip R. Thompson	DR	VA-18	March 4, 1801	Elected to this Congress: April 22, 1801
104	George B. Upham	F	NH-al	March 4, 1801	
105	Killian K. Van Rensselaer	F	NY-8	March 4, 1801	
106	Benjamin Walker	F	NY-9	March 4, 1801	Only term while serving as a member of the House.
Members joining the House, after the start of the Congress
...	John Milledge	DR	GA-al	March 23, 1801	Previously served (A) November 22, 1792–93 and (DR) 1795-99 while as a member of the House. Special election. Chairman: Elections (1801–02). Resigned to become Governor: November 9, 1802.
...	Calvin Goddard	F	CT-al	May 18, 1801	Special election: April 9, 1801
...	Richard Cutts	DR	MA-14	June 22, 1801	Special election
...	Charles Johnson	DR	NC-8	August 7, 1801	Special election: August 6–7, 1801. Died on July 23, 1802, while still serving as a member of the House.
...	Seth Hastings	F	MA-4	August 24, 1801	Special election. Seated January 11, 1802.
...	Benjamin Tallmadge	F	CT-al	September 21, 1801	Special election
...	Theodorus Bailey	DR	NY-5	October 6, 1801	Previously served (A) 1793-95 and (DR) 1795-97 and 1799-1801 while as a member of the House. Special election: October 6–8, 1801. Last term while serving as a member of the House.
...	John P. Van Ness	DR	NY-6	October 6, 1801	Special election: October 6–8, 1801. Seated December 7, 1801. Seat declared forfeited: January 17, 1803.
...	William Hoge	DR	PA-12	October 13, 1801	Special election
...	Isaac Van Horne	DR	PA-4	October 13, 1801	Special election
...	William Dickson	DR	TN-al	October 30, 1801	Special election: October 29–30, 1801
...	Walter Bowie	DR	MD-2	March 24, 1802	Special election: March 2, 1802
...	Samuel Hunt	F	NH-al	December 6, 1802	Special election: August 30, 1802
...	David Meriwether	DR	GA-al	December 6, 1802	Special election: April 5, 1802
...	Samuel Thatcher	F	MA-12	December 6, 1802	Special election: July 29, 1802
...	Thomas Wynns	DR	NC-8	December 7, 1802	Special election: October 15, 1802
...	Peter Early	DR	GA-al	January 10, 1803	Special election: December 15, 1802
...	Richard Winn	DR	SC-4	January 24, 1803	Previously served (A) 1793-95 and (DR) 1795–97. Special election: April 12–14, 1802.
Non voting members
a	Paul Fearing	F	OH-al	March 4, 1801	Delegate for Northwest Territory (future OH). Term ended on OH admission.
b	Narsworthy Hunter	-	MS-al	March 4, 1801	Delegate for Mississippi Territory. Died on March 11, 1802.
c	Thomas M. Green, Jr.	DR	MS-al	December 6, 1802	Delegate for Mississippi Territory. Special election. Only term.

== See also ==
- 7th United States Congress
- List of United States congressional districts
- List of United States senators in the 7th Congress
