= List of United States senators in the 7th Congress =

This is a complete list of United States senators during the 7th United States Congress listed by seniority from March 4, 1801, to March 3, 1803.

The order of service is based on the commencement of the senator's first term, with senators entering service the same day ranked alphabetically.

The two main parties in the 7th Congress were the Federalists (F), and Democratic Republicans (DR).

== Terms of service ==
Class	Terms of service of senators that expired in years
Class 2	Terms of service of senators that expired in 1803 (DE, GA, KY, MA, NC, NH, NJ, RI, SC, TN, and VA.)
Class 3	Terms of service of senators that expired in 1805 (CT, DE, MD, NH, NJ, NY, OH, PA, RI, SC, and VT.)
Class 1	Terms of service of senators that expired in 1807 (CT, GA, IN, KY, LA, MA, MD, NC, NY, OH, PA, TN, VA, and VT.)

== U.S. Senate seniority list ==
U.S. Senate seniority
Rank	Historical rank	Senator (party-state)	Seniority date
1	26	Theodore Foster (F-RI)	June 7, 1790
2	36	John Brown (DR-KY)	June 18, 1792
3	43	Samuel Livermore (F-NH)	March 4, 1793
4	47	James Ross (F-PA)	April 24, 1794
5	48	Stevens Thomson Mason (DR-VA)	November 18, 1794
6	54	Elijah Paine (F-VT)	March 4, 1795
7	63	Uriah Tracy (F-CT)	October 13, 1796
8	67	John Eager Howard (F-MD)	November 21, 1796
9	68	James Hillhouse (F-CT)	December 6, 1796
10	70	Joseph Inslee Anderson (DR-TN)	September 26, 1797
11	72	Nathaniel Chipman (F-VT)	October 17, 1797
12	73	Ray Greene (F-RI)	November 13, 1797
13	81	Charles Pinckney (DR-SC)	December 6, 1798
14	82	William Hill Wells (F-DE)	January 17, 1799
15	62	William Cocke (DR-TN)	
16	83	Abraham Baldwin (DR-GA)	March 4, 1799
17	84	Jonathan Dayton (F-NJ)	March 4, 1799
18	86	Jesse Franklin (DR-NC)	March 4, 1799
19	88	Wilson Cary Nicholas (DR-VA)	December 5, 1799
20	89	Gouverneur Morris (F-NY)	April 3, 1800
21	90	Dwight Foster (F-MA)	June 6, 1800
22	91	John Armstrong Jr. (DR-NY)	November 6, 1800
23	92	Jonathan Mason (F-MA)	November 14, 1800
24	93	William Hindman (F-MD)	December 12, 1800
25	94	Aaron Ogden (F-NJ)	February 28, 1801
26	95	Samuel White (F-DE)	February 28, 1801
27	96	John Breckinridge (DR-KY)	March 4, 1801
28	97	John E. Colhoun (DR-SC)	March 4, 1801
29	42	James Jackson (DR-GA)	March 4, 1801
30	98	Peter Muhlenberg (DR-PA)	March 4, 1801
31	99	James Sheafe (F-NH)	March 4, 1801
32	100	David Stone (DR-NC)	March 4, 1801
33	101	Christopher Ellery (DR-RI)	May 6, 1801
34	102	Simeon Olcott (F-NH)	June 17, 1801
35	103	George Logan (DR-PA)	July 13, 1801
36	34	Stephen Row Bradley (DR-VT)	October 15, 1801
37	104	Robert Wright (DR-MD)	November 19, 1801
38	105	Thomas Sumter (DR-SC)	December 15, 1801
39	106	De Witt Clinton (DR-NY)	February 9, 1802
40	107	William Plumer (F-NH)	June 17, 1802
41	2	Pierce Butler (DR-SC)	November 4, 1802

== See also ==
- 7th United States Congress
- List of United States representatives in the 7th Congress
