= Richard Olney II =

American politician (1871–1939)

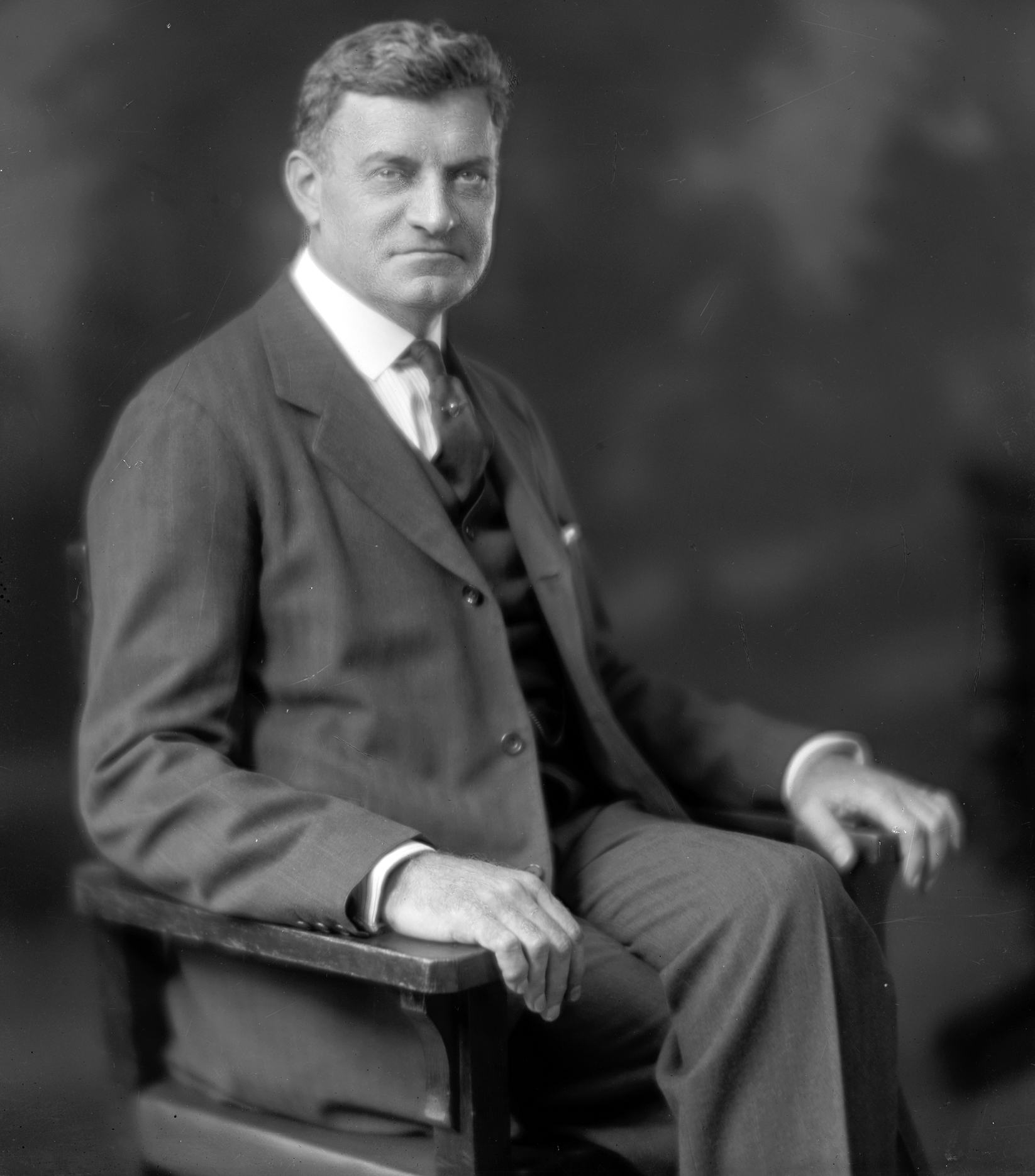

Member of the U.S. House of Representatives from Massachusetts's 14th district
- In office March 4, 1915 – March 3, 1921
- Preceded by: Edward Gilmore
- Succeeded by: Louis A. Frothingham

Personal details
- Born: January 5, 1871 Milton, New Hampshire
- Died: January 15, 1939 (aged 68) Boston, Massachusetts
- Party: Democratic
- Education: Brown University
- Occupation: Businessman

Richard Olney (January 5, 1871 Milton, Strafford County, New Hampshire – January 15, 1939 Boston, Massachusetts) was an American politician who served as a member of the United States House of Representatives from Massachusetts.

== Life ==
He attended the public schools, Leicester Academy and graduated from Brown University in 1892. He became a wool merchant. Olney was elected a member of the Massachusetts House of Representatives in 1902. He was chairman of the Board of Selectmen of Leicester.

He was an unsuccessful candidate for lieutenant governor in 1903, was member of the Massachusetts Minimum Wage Commission, and was a delegate to the Democratic National Convention in 1912. Olney was elected as a Democrat to the 64th, 65th and 66th United States Congresses, serving from March 4, 1915, to March 3, 1921.

He was appointed a member of the World War Foreign Debt Commission in 1923 and reappointed by President Calvin Coolidge in 1925. He served as chairman of the Massachusetts Parole Board, and was chairman of the Massachusetts Commission of the Necessaries of Life from 1938 until his death. He was buried at the Cherry Valley Cemetery in Leicester.

Olney was a nephew of U.S. Secretary of State and Attorney General Richard Olney and of New York County D. A. Peter B. Olney.

U.S. House of Representatives
Preceded by Edward Gilmore	Member of the U.S. House of Representatives from Massachusetts's 14th congressional district 1915 - 1921	Succeeded by Louis A. Frothingham
Party political offices
Preceded by Herbert C. Joyner	Democratic nominee for Lieutenant Governor of Massachusetts; 1903	Succeeded by John Crawford Crosby
