= Isaac Parker (Massachusetts judge) =

American judge

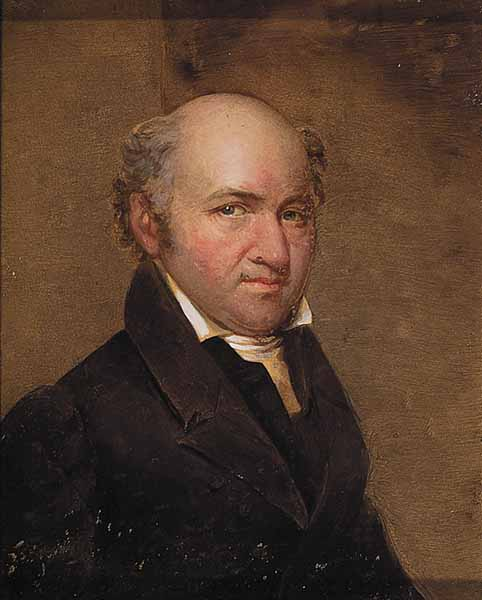

Member of the U.S. House of Representatives from Massachusetts's 12th district
- In office March 4, 1797 – March 3, 1799
- Preceded by: Henry Dearborn
- Succeeded by: Silas Lee

Personal details
- Born: June 17, 1768 Boston, Province of Massachusetts Bay, British America
- Died: July 25, 1830 (aged 62) Boston, Massachusetts, U.S.
- Party: Federalist
- Spouse: Rebecca Parker

Isaac Parker (June 17, 1768 – July 25, 1830) was a Massachusetts Congressman and jurist, including Chief Justice of the Massachusetts Supreme Judicial Court from 1814 to his death.

== Biography ==
He was born in Boston in the Province of Massachusetts Bay, the son of Daniel Parker, a goldsmith, and Margaret (née Jarvis) Parker. He was descended from John Parker, of Bideford, Devon, who emigrated to America in 1629 and whose children settled in Charlestown. After preparation at the Latin Grammar School, he entered Harvard at the age of fourteen and graduated in 1786 with high honors. For a short time he taught at the Latin School. Then, after studying law and being admitted to the bar, he moved to Castine, in what was later the state of Maine. There he set up his law practice, later moving to Portland and holding several local offices. On June 17, 1794, he married Rebecca Hall, daughter of Joseph Hall of Medford, a descendant of John Hall who settled in Concord in 1658. They had eight children. He was a member of the Brattle Street Church.

In 1796, when he was twenty-eight, Parker was elected as a Federalist to the 5th Congress, but after one term of which little record of activity is available, he retired voluntarily to become United States Marshal for the Maine district (serving from March 5, 1799, to December 21, 1803). He was displaced upon Thomas Jefferson's accession to the presidency and returned to his law practice. He had made his impression, however, and on January 28, 1806, Governor Caleb Strong, upon the death of Justice Simeon Strong, appointed him an associate justice of the Massachusetts Supreme Judicial Court. Parker was inclined to refuse the honor, but upon his friends' urgent solicitations accepted and moved to Boston. He was shortly called upon to sit in the trial of T. O. Selfridge, charged with shooting the son of Benjamin Austin in a political quarrel. Feelings ran high and Parker won a great reputation for impartiality. He was elected a Fellow of the American Academy of Arts and Sciences in 1811. In 1814 he was elevated to the chief justiceship. In 1816 he was inaugurated as first Royall Professor of Law at Harvard. It was not a teaching chair, and in May 1817 he laid before the Corporation a plan for a law school. The plan was adopted and Harvard Law School was established, with Asahel Stearns as first instructor. Parker continued to lecture until 1827. He was a twenty-year overseer of Harvard and for eleven years a trustee of Bowdoin; he also served as president of the Massachusetts constitutional convention of 1820, taking part in the debate when he was relieved from the duties of presiding officer. His published works were confined to his judicial decisions and to a few orations, revealing a somewhat less florid style than that which characterized the times. He remained Chief Justice until his death in Boston, after which he was buried on Copp's Hill.

Parker was elected a member of the American Antiquarian Society in 1819.

Among his more controversial rulings was in Baker v. Fales, an 1820 case involving the First Church and Parish in Dedham, the majority of whose regular churchgoers, more conservative Congregationalists, had left the parish when a liberal Unitarian pastor was appointed by the town, and claimed the property as their own. The Unitarian Parker wrote: "When the majority of the members of a Congregational church separate from the majority of the parish, the members who remain, although a minority, constitute the church in such parish, and retain the rights and property belonging thereto" – including recognition as an established church. Consequently, 3,900 Congregationalists from 81 churches left behind property valued at $600,000; church and state were separated in Massachusetts in 1833.

In Commonwealth vs Griffith (MA1823), Parker argued that slaves were not considered persons with constitutional rights but were considered property.

In 1825 Parker wrote the opinion for Mills v. Wyman (20 Mass. (3 Pick.) 207.), a case which has been characterized by Professor Geoffrey R. Watson as "one of the leading American cases on moral obligation in contract law."

Parker's decisions illuminate both the man's character and the jurisprudence of the period. They indicate a mind of exceptional clarity and penetration, albeit with a sensitivity to the needs of changing times. In the words of Justice Story: "It was a critical moment in the progress of our jurisprudence... We wanted a mind to do in some good degree what Lord Mansfield had done in England, to breathe into our common law an energy suited to the wants, the commercial interests and the enterprise of the age". It was a time when equity was more important than law. Parker rendered this kind of service, and many of his decisions came to be recognized as authoritative generally through the state and federal courts. "He felt that the rules, not of evidence merely, but of all substantial law must widen with the wants of society". In addition he rendered no small service by consolidating the reforms in the Massachusetts judicial system, instituted in the early years of the century. His character was eminently suited to his role. Above the petinesses of party strife, free from affectation, at the same time both patient and gay, he carried into his public life the rectitude of an active and sincere religious conviction. He would die 3 days after he had said he never felt better and in his career he never missed a day on the bench. He died July 27 on the day he was to hear the trial of Frank Knapp for the murder of Joseph Story's brother-in-law's uncle Joseph White.

== Publications ==
- Oration on Washington (Boston, 1800)
- Sketch of the Character of Chief Justice Parsons (1813)

== Notes ==
U.S. House of Representatives
Preceded by Henry Dearborn	Member of the U.S. House of Representatives from Massachusetts's 12th congressional district (Maine district); March 4, 1797 – March 3, 1799	Succeeded by Silas Lee
Legal offices
Preceded by Simeon Strong	Associate Justice of the Massachusetts Supreme Judicial Court; March 1806 – August 24, 1814	Succeeded by Samuel Hubbard
Preceded by Samuel Sewall	Chief Justice of the Massachusetts Supreme Judicial Court; August 24, 1814 – July 25, 1830	Succeeded by Lemuel Shaw
