= 1798 United States House of Representatives elections in New York =

United States House of Representatives elections in New York, 1798
- April 24–26, 1798

All 10 New York seats to the United States House of Representatives
	Majority party	Minority party
Party	Democratic-Republican	Federalist
Last election	4	6
Seats won	6	4
Seat change	▲2	▼2
Popular vote	18,281	18,589
Percentage	49.6%	50.4%

The 1798 United States House of Representatives elections in New York were held from April 24 to 26, 1798, to elect ten U.S. Representatives to represent the State of New York in the United States House of Representatives of the 6th United States Congress.

== Background ==
Ten U.S. Representatives had been elected in December 1796 to a term in the 5th United States Congress beginning on March 4, 1795. Their term would end on March 3, 1799. After three winter elections (January 1793, December 1794 and December 1796), the New York State Legislature moved the congressional elections back to be held together with the State elections in late April (like in 1790), about ten months before the term would start on March 4, 1799, and about a year and a half before Congress actually met on December 2, 1799.

== Congressional districts ==
On January 27, 1789, the New York State Legislature had divided the State of New York into six congressional districts which were not numbered. On December 18, 1792, the Legislature divided the State into ten districts, which were still not numbered. On March 27, 1797, the Legislature re-apportioned the districts, taking into account the new counties which had been created in the meanwhile, and for the first time the districts were numbered.

- The 1st District comprising Kings, Queens, Suffolk and Richmond counties.
- The 2nd District comprising the first six wards of New York County.
- The 3rd District comprising the 7th Ward of New York County, and Westchester and Rockland counties.
- The 4th District comprising Orange, Ulster and Delaware counties.
- The 5th District comprising Dutchess County.
- The 6th District comprising Columbia and Rensselaer counties.
- The 7th District comprising Clinton, Saratoga and Washington counties.
- The 8th District comprising Albany and Schoharie counties.
- The 9th District comprising Herkimer, Montgomery, Chenango and Oneida counties.
- The 10th District comprising Ontario, Otsego, Tioga, Onondaga and Steuben counties.

Note: There are now 62 counties in the State of New York. The counties which are not mentioned in this list had not yet been established, or sufficiently organized, the area being included in one or more of the abovementioned counties.

== Result ==
6 Democratic-Republicans and 4 Federalists were elected. Of the incumbents, Havens, Livingston, Van Cortlandt, Elmendorf and Glen were re-elected; Brooks and Williams were defeated; and Hezekiah L. Hosmer, John E. Van Alen and James Cochran did not run for re-election.

1798 United States House election result
District	Democratic-Republican		Federalist		Also ran	
1	Jonathan N. Havens	1,758	Richard Thorn	1,502		
2	Edward Livingston	1,734	Philip Livingston	1,559		
3	Philip Van Cortlandt	1,673	Mordecai Hale	496		
4	Lucas Elmendorf	2,812	Jonathan Hasbrouck	1,482	John Hathorn (D-R)	47
5	Theodorus Bailey	1,502	David Brooks	1,192		
6	Elisha Jenkins	1,945	John Bird	2,809		
7	John Thompson	2,197	John Williams	1,569	Jellis A. Fonda (Fed.)	419
8			Henry Glen	2,643		
9	Peter Smith	2,748	Jonas Platt	2,880		
10	Moss Kent	1,865	William Cooper	2,038		

Note: The Anti-Federalists called themselves "Republicans." However, at the same time, the Federalists called them "Democrats" which was meant to be pejorative. After some time both terms got more and more confused, and sometimes used together as "Democratic Republicans" which later historians have adopted (with a hyphen) to describe the party from the beginning, to avoid confusion with both the later established and still existing Democratic and Republican parties.

== Aftermath ==
The House of Representatives of the 6th United States Congress met for the first time at Congress Hall in Philadelphia on December 2, 1799, and nine representatives took their seats on this day.

== Special election ==
Jonathan N. Havens, who had been re-elected to a third term, died on October 25, 1799, shortly before Congress met. A special election to fill the vacancy was held in the 1st District in December 1799, and was won by John Smith, of the same party as Havens. Smith took his seat on February 27, 1800.

1799 United States House special election result
District	Democratic-Republican		Federalist		Federalist	
1	John Smith	1,599	Silas Wood	1,098	Gozen Ryerss	148

== Sources ==
- The New York Civil List compiled in 1858 (see: pg. 65 for district apportionment; pg. 68 for Congressmen)
- Members of the Sixth United States Congress
- Election result 1st D. at Tufts University Library project "A New Nation Votes"
- Election result 2nd D. at Tufts University Library project "A New Nation Votes"
- Election result 3rd D. at Tufts University Library project "A New Nation Votes"
- Election result 4th D. at Tufts University Library project "A New Nation Votes"
- Election result 5th D. at Tufts University Library project "A New Nation Votes"
- Election result 6th D. at Tufts University Library project "A New Nation Votes"
- Election result 7th D. at Tufts University Library project "A New Nation Votes"
- Election result 8th D. at Tufts University Library project "A New Nation Votes"
- Election result 9th D. at Tufts University Library project "A New Nation Votes"
- Election result 10th D. at Tufts University Library project "A New Nation Votes"
- Special election result 1st D. at Tufts University Library project "A New Nation Votes"
