= Henry Clay White =

American chemist (1848–1927)

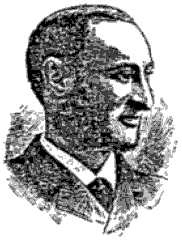
- Born: December 30, 1848; Baltimore, Maryland
- Died: November 30, 1927 (aged 78); Athens, Georgia
- Occupation: Chemist
- Spouse: Ella Frances Roberts (m. 1872)
- Parent(s): Levi and Louisa

Henry Clay White (1848–1927) was an American chemist, notable for his contributions to agricultural science and higher education. He was also an early proponent of Darwin's theory of evolution.

== Early life and education ==
Henry Clay White was born in Baltimore, Maryland on December 30, 1848.

He graduated from the University of Virginia in 1870.

== Career ==
After graduation from the University of Virginia, he briefly worked at a chemical company in Baltimore and lectured at what would later become the Maryland Institute College of Art.

From 1871 to 1872, he was a professor at St. John's College in Annapolis, but he left before the end of the term to take up a post at the University of Georgia.

From 1872 to 1927, he was professor of chemistry at the University of Georgia. In 1893 he was elected as a member of the Royal Society of Chemistry.

In 1909, he organized a conference celebrating the 100th anniversary of the birth of Charles Darwin.

In 1926, he wrote a biography on Abraham Baldwin, the founder of the University of Georgia.

He died on November 30, 1927, in Athens, Georgia.

== Personal life ==
He married Ella Frances Roberts on December 19, 1872. They had no children.
