= Mills v. Wyman =

1825 Supreme Judicial Court of Massachusetts case

- Court: Supreme Judicial Court of Massachusetts
- Decided: 1825

Court membership
- Chief judge: Isaac Parker

Daniel Mills v. Seth Wyman (20 Mass. (3 Pick.) 207.) is an 1825 civil case decided by the Supreme Judicial Court of Massachusetts. It has been characterized by Professor Geoffrey R. Watson as "one of the leading American cases on moral obligation in contract law." The opinion was written by Chief Justice Isaac Parker.

== Facts ==
The plaintiff, Daniel Mills, voluntarily cared for the 25-year-old son of the defendant, who had fallen ill on his return from a sea voyage, for 15 days, until the defendant's son eventually died from the illness. The defendant, Seth Wyman, sent a letter to Mills promising to pay him for the board and cost of care of his son, but never actually did so. Mills sued for breach of contract.

== Procedural history ==
The action of assumpsit was first tried in a Court of Common Pleas, where a Judge Howe directed a nonsuit. The plaintiff filed exceptions to the nonsuit.

== Reasoning and holding ==
In his opinion, Justice Parker first addresses the real moral obligation the defendant owes the plaintiff. However, he holds, a moral obligation is not sufficient consideration to support a later promise to pay. Since there is no consideration (the care was already bestowed at the time of the promise, and no material benefit was rendered to the defendant, as the son is not a dependent of his father), there is no legal duty. According to Justice Parker, this is a case of a particular injustice resulting from a general rule which must be maintained in order to prevent greater injustices. The Court of Common Pleas' nonsuit direction was upheld.

== Legacy ==
In his 1997 article "In the Tribunal of Conscience: Mills v. Wyman Reconsidered," Professor Geoffrey R. Watson claims to have discovered "the real facts of the case," that: "the father did not make the promise in question, the son did not die until years later, and the law did not mandate the holding in the case." Watson argues for "reform of moral obligation doctrine, and more generally, of consideration doctrine," and "contends that promises should be binding if they are made with formalities indicating intent to be legally bound."

E. Allan Farnsworth casts "the venerable case of Mills v. Wyman" as a "Parable About Promises," arguing that "at the risk of offending some readers ... traditional sources in the Judeo-Christian tradition––particularly those with which students are likely to be familiar––have surprisingly little to say about my moral obligation to perform my promises; that they have even less to say about when the law should enforce my promises; and that, at least as to the second of these points, it is just as well for our society that they do not have much to say."
