= 1801 Massachusetts's 14th congressional district special election =

A special election was held in Massachusetts's 14th congressional district to fill the vacancy left by George Thatcher (F) declining to serve a 7th term, having served continuously since the 1st Congress and, after the death of Thomas Hartley (F) in Pennsylvania's 8th congressional district on December 21, 1800, the last remaining member of the 1st Congress to have continuously served in the House. The election was held on June 22, 1801

== Election results ==
Candidate	Party	Votes	Percent
Richard Cutts	Democratic-Republican	634	55.6%
John Lords	Federalist	394	34.5%
Benjamin Greene	Unknown	113	9.9%

Cutts took his seat with the rest of the 7th Congress at the start of the 1st session.

== See also ==
- List of special elections to the United States House of Representatives
