= Commonwealth v Griffith (MA 1823) =

Commonwealth v Griffith is a Massachusetts Supreme Judicial Court case that dealt with a slave catcher named Camillus Griffith who recaptured an African American slave named Randolph (last name unknown). The issues brought up in this case were Griffith not attaining a warrant before seizing Randolph, if slaves were considered in the U.S. Constitution and if they were, was the Fugitive Slave Act of 1793 constitutional, and lastly who should make the decision regarding this issue on slaves and how they can be seized. The case included Chief Justice Parker delivering an opinion in agreeance with Griffith's plea and a dissent from Justice Thatcher who stated that the law of Massachusetts should not be violated, however, at the same time the ruling decision should be made by Congress. The case's decision really analyzed the meaning of the 4th Amendment (1791) and was one of many cases that paved a way to the ratification of the 13th Amendment (1865).

== Case summary ==
Camillus Griffith, by trade, was a traveling slave catcher who had seized and recaptured a slave named Randolph in the year of 1823. Randolph was on his own property at the time, in New Bedford, Massachusetts when, without warrant, Griffith seized and kept him in confinement. Griffith was charged with assault, battery, and unjust imprisonment, which he claimed were legal acts under the federal law. Griffith appealed to the Supreme Judicial Court of Massachusetts after being convicted by the trial court. Griffith admitted that he did not have a written document giving him permission to recapture Randolph, however he pleaded that slaves were not included in the U.S. Constitution therefore had no constitutional rights. Chief Justice Parker heard Griffith's plea and agreed that slaves had no constitutional rights, therefore he ruled in Griffith's favor.

== Chief Justice Parker delivers the Court's opinion ==
Chief Justice Isaac Parker, in summary, said that they could not prove that slaves were included in the writing of the U.S. Constitution therefore, they would deem that Griffith's actions be considered U.S. Constitutional. He said, "We must reflect, however, that the U.S. Constitution was made with some States in which it would not occur to the mind, to inquire whether slaves were property." He then goes on to explain that the words in the U.S. Constitution were used out of respect for those who did not agree with slavery, "The words of it [U.S. Constitution] were used out of delicacy, so as not to offend some in the convention whose feelings were abhorrent to slavery; but we there entered into an agreement that slaves should be considered as property. Slavery would still have continued if no U.S. Constitution had been made. The U.S. Constitution does not prescribe the mode of reclaiming a slave, but leaves it to be determined by Congress."

== Justice Thatcher's dissent ==
Justice George Thatcher told Chief Justice Parker that he agreed to many things that Parker said, however he did not completely agree with him. Thatcher said he agreed that the U.S. Constitution had not been violated, however, he believed that the U.S. Constitution was intended "conform" to the laws of all the States in regard to seizures, but still not violate the law of one of the States. Thatcher stated that the laws of Massachusetts did not "recognize" a slave, but rather "freemen." He said, "Every person here is a free man, and entitled to all privileges of a freeman; one of which is to be secure against all seizures…" He went on to admit that southerners were allowed to seize without a warrant because the laws in their states said it was a legal action, while in northern states it was definitely not a legal action because the state's law says so. He said that the complaint should not even describe Randolph as a slave because according to the law of the northern states, it did not recognize anyone as being a slave. He argued therefore, that the claim of slave should be thrown out, and it should be ruled that the defendant (Griffith) completely violated the law of Massachusetts and should be charged solely for his crimes.

== Significance ==
The significance of the case regards whether the Fugitive Slave Act (1793) was constitutional or not. The Fugitive Slave Act allowed plantation masters to recapture or hire someone else to recapture one of their runaway slaves. Chief Justice Parker argued slaves were not "parties in the constitution," therefore, the act was deemed not unconstitutional because slaves were property not a person. Thus when translating and analyzing the 4th Amendment (1791) they determined who it did or did not apply to. Therefore, it was determined that slaves were not covered by the U.S. Constitution, making the Fugitive Slave Act constitutional. When the 13th Amendment was ratified in 1865 a wave of change blew in, it annulled the Fugitive Slave Act and the legislation that came with it. This was a significant shift because slaves were now beginning to be considered as persons not property, persons who had rights and who were covered under the 4th amendment.
