= Robert O. Harris =

American politician (1854–1926)

Robert Orr Harris
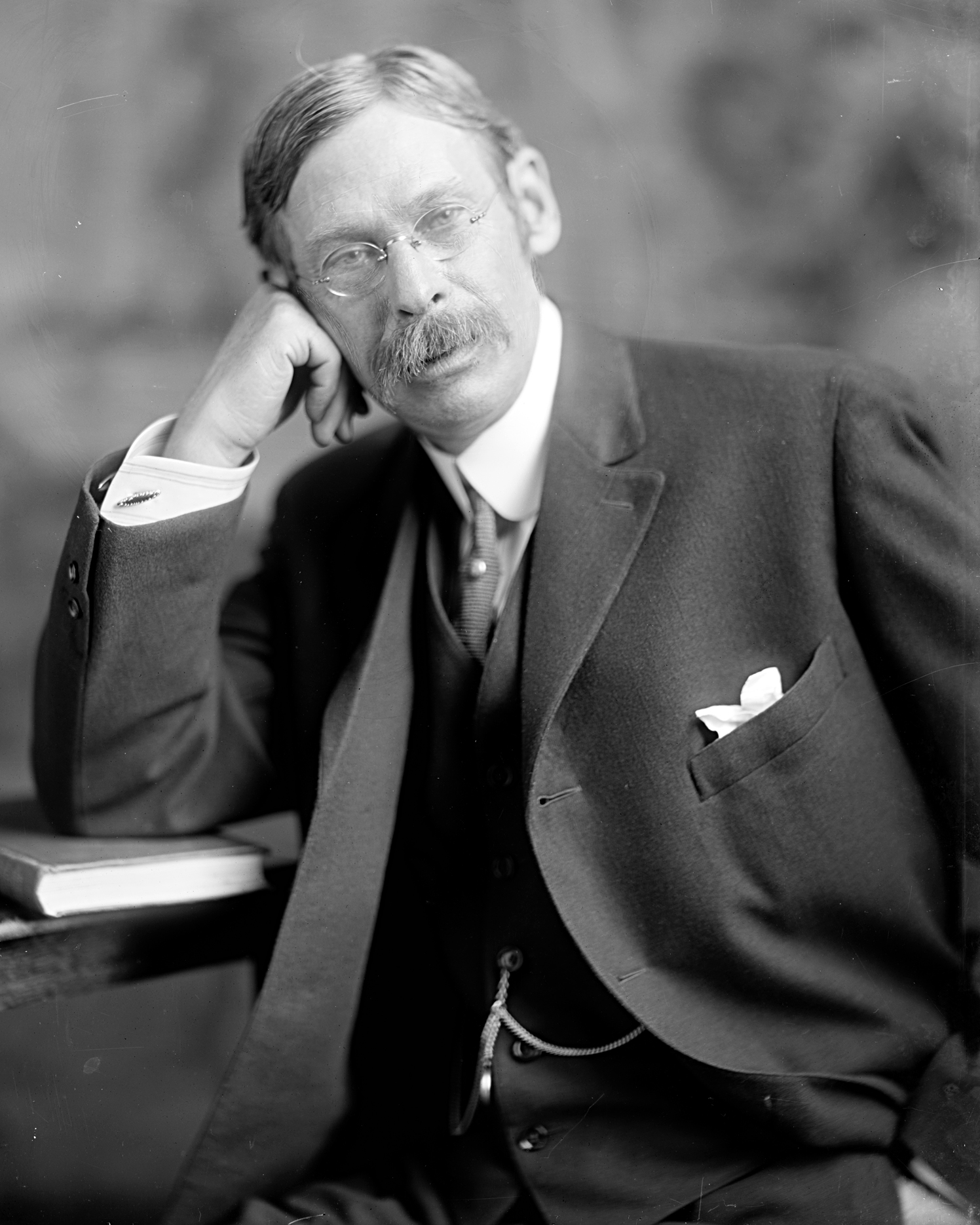

Member of the U.S. House of Representatives from Massachusetts's 14th district
- In office March 4, 1911 – March 3, 1913
- Preceded by: Eugene Foss
- Succeeded by: Edward Gilmore

United States Attorney for the District of Massachusetts
- In office 1921–1924
- Preceded by: Daniel J. Gallagher
- Succeeded by: Harold P. Williams

Member of the Massachusetts House of Representatives
- In office 1889

Personal details
- Born: November 8, 1854 Boston, Massachusetts, U.S.
- Died: June 13, 1926 (aged 71) Brockton, Massachusetts, U.S.
- Party: Republican
- Education: Harvard University
- Profession: Lawyer

Robert Orr Harris (November 8, 1854 – June 13, 1926) was a U.S. representative from Massachusetts, son of Benjamin Winslow Harris.

Born in Boston, Massachusetts, Harris attended the common schools and Phillips Exeter Academy, Exeter, New Hampshire. He graduated from Harvard in 1877. He studied law. He was admitted to the bar in 1879 and practiced in Boston and Brockton, Massachusetts from 1879 to 1902. He served as member of the State house of representatives in 1889. He served as district attorney for the southeastern district of Massachusetts 1891-1901. He served as associate judge of the superior court of Massachusetts from June 4, 1902, to March 1, 1911.

Harris was elected as a Republican to the Sixty-second Congress (March 4, 1911 – March 3, 1913). He was not a candidate for renomination in 1912. He resumed the practice of law. He was appointed United States district attorney for the Massachusetts district by President Harding in 1921 and served until removed by President Coolidge in December 1924. He died in Brockton, Massachusetts, June 13, 1926. He was interred in Central Cemetery, East Bridgewater, Massachusetts.

U.S. House of Representatives
Preceded by Eugene Foss	Member of the U.S. House of Representatives from Massachusetts's 14th congressional district March 4, 1911 - March 3, 1913	Succeeded by Edward Gilmore
