= Edward Gilmore =

American politician (1867–1924)

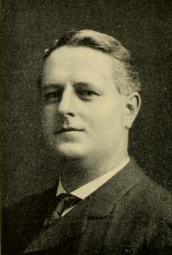

Member of the U.S. House of Representatives from Massachusetts's 14th district
- In office March 4, 1913 – March 3, 1915
- Preceded by: Robert O. Harris
- Succeeded by: Richard Olney II

Member of the Massachusetts House of Representatives
- In office 1907-1908

Personal details
- Born: January 4, 1867 Brockton, Massachusetts, U.S.
- Died: April 10, 1924 (aged 57) Boston, Massachusetts, U.S.
- Resting place: Calvary Cemetery in Brockton, Massachusetts
- Education: Massachusetts State University
- Occupation: Merchant

Edward Gilmore (January 4, 1867 – April 10, 1924) was a United States representative from Massachusetts. He was born in Brockton, Massachusetts. He attended the public schools, and Massachusetts State University extension classes. He engaged in mercantile pursuits. He was a member of the Democratic State committee 1896–1903, and was a delegate to the Democratic National Conventions in 1900 and 1904. He served as president of the Brockton Board of Aldermen 1901–1906.

He was a member of the Massachusetts House of Representatives in 1907 and 1908. He was elected as a Democrat to the Sixty-third Congress (March 4, 1913 – March 3, 1915). He then served as postmaster of Brockton 1915–1923, city assessor in 1923 and 1924, and died in Boston on April 19, 1924. His interment was in Calvary Cemetery in Brockton.

U.S. House of Representatives
Preceded by Robert O. Harris	Member of the U.S. House of Representatives from Massachusetts's 14th congressional district March 4, 1913 - March 3, 1915	Succeeded by Richard Olney
