= 1801 New York's 6th congressional district special election =

A special election was held in New York's 6th congressional district October 6–8, 1801 to fill a vacancy left by the resignation of John Bird (F) on July 26, 1801, prior to the first meeting of the 7th Congress.

== Election results ==
| Candidate | Party | Votes | Percent |
|---|---|---|---|
| John P. Van Ness | Democratic-Republican | 1,981 | 64.1% |
| Hezekiah L. Hosmer | Federalist | 1,111 | 35.9% |

John P. Van Ness took his seat December 7, 1801, but did not complete the term, as he was appointed by President Thomas Jefferson as a major in the militia of the District of Columbia and on January 17, 1803, his seat was declared vacant and left vacant until the start of the Eighth Congress.

== See also ==
- List of special elections to the United States House of Representatives
