= Salem Towne =

American educator (1779–1864)

Salem Towne (March 5, 1779 – February 24, 1864) was an American educator, writer and politician.

He wrote "System of Speculative Masonry" (1818), "An Analysis of Derivative Words in the English Language" (1830) and a series of school readers with Nelson M. Holbrook of which more than a million copies were said to be sold.

Towne was born in Belchertown, Massachusetts, and taught in New York, where he was elected to the State Senate. He died in Greencastle, Indiana.
