= 1801 Pennsylvania's 4th congressional district special election =

A special election was held in Pennsylvania's 4th congressional district on October 13, 1801, to fill a vacancy left by the resignation of Peter Muhlenberg (DR) on March 3, 1801, prior to the beginning of the 7th Congress. Muhlenberg had been elected to the Senate.

== Election results ==
Candidate	Party	Votes	Percent
Isaac Van Horne	Democratic-Republican	4,687	100%

There were no other candidates for the vacant seat.

== See also ==
- List of special elections to the United States House of Representatives
