= Massachusetts's 14th congressional district =

Obsolete district in Massachusetts, US

- Obsolete district
- Created: 1795; 1900
- Eliminated: 1820; 1960
- Years active: 1795–1820; 1903–1963

Massachusetts's current districts, since 2013

Massachusetts's 14th congressional district is an obsolete district that was first active 1795–1820 in the District of Maine, and again active 1903–1963 in eastern Massachusetts. It was most recently eliminated in 1963 after the 1960 U.S. census. Its last congressman was Joseph William Martin Jr., who was redistricted into the 10th district.

== Cities and towns in the district ==
- Bristol City: Easton
- Norfolk County:
  - Quincy
  - Avon
  - Braintree
  - Canton
  - Dedham
  - Foxboro
  - Holbrook
  - Milton
  - Norwood
  - Randolph
  - Sharon
  - Stoughton
  - Westwood
  - Weymouth
- Plymouth County:
  - Brockton
  - Abington
  - Rockland
  - East Bridgewater
  - West Bridgewater
  - Whitman
- Suffolk County: Boston (Ward 26).

== List of members representing the district ==
Representative	Party	Years	Cong ress	Electoral history	District location
District created in the District of Maine – March 4, 1795
George Thatcher (Biddeford)	Federalist	March 4, 1795 – March 3, 1801	4th 5th 6th	Redistricted from the 4th district and re-elected in 1795 on the second ballot. Re-elected in 1796. Re-elected in 1798. Re-elected in 1800, but declined to serve.	1795–1803 "3rd Eastern district," District of Maine
Vacant		March 3, 1801 – December 7, 1801	7th		1795–1803 "3rd Eastern district," District of Maine
Richard Cutts (Pepperrellborough)	Democratic-Republican	December 7, 1801 – March 3, 1813	7th 8th 9th 10th 11th 12th	Elected to finish Thatcher's term. Re-elected in 1802. Re-elected in 1804. Re-elected in 1806. Re-elected in 1808. Re-elected in 1810. Lost re-election.	1795–1803 "3rd Eastern district," District of Maine
Richard Cutts (Pepperrellborough)	Democratic-Republican	December 7, 1801 – March 3, 1813	7th 8th 9th 10th 11th 12th	Elected to finish Thatcher's term. Re-elected in 1802. Re-elected in 1804. Re-elected in 1806. Re-elected in 1808. Re-elected in 1810. Lost re-election.	1803–1813 "York district," District of Maine
Cyrus King (Saco)	Federalist	March 4, 1813 – March 3, 1817	13th 14th	Elected in 1812. Re-elected in 1814. Lost re-election.	1813–1820 "1st Eastern district," District of Maine
John Holmes (Alfred)	Democratic-Republican	March 4, 1817 – March 15, 1820	15th 16th	Elected in 1816. Re-elected in 1818. Redistricted to Maine's at-large district but resigned when elected U.S. Senator.	1813–1820 "1st Eastern district," District of Maine
District moved to Maine March 15, 1820
District restored in Massachusetts March 4, 1903
William C. Lovering (Taunton)	Republican	March 4, 1903 – February 4, 1910	58th 59th 60th 61st	Redistricted from the 12th district and re-elected in 1902. Re-elected in 1904. Re-elected in 1906. Re-elected in 1908. Died.	1903–1913 [data missing]
Vacant		February 4, 1910 – March 22, 1910	61st		1903–1913 [data missing]
Eugene Foss (Boston)	Democratic	March 22, 1910 – January 4, 1911	61st	Elected to finish Lovering's term. Resigned to become Governor.	1903–1913 [data missing]
Vacant		January 4, 1911 – March 3, 1911	61st		1903–1913 [data missing]
Robert O. Harris (East Bridgewater)	Republican	March 4, 1911 – March 3, 1913	62nd	Elected in 1910. Retired.	1903–1913 [data missing]
Edward Gilmore (Brockton)	Democratic	March 4, 1913 – March 3, 1915	63rd	Elected in 1912. Retired.	1913–1923 [data missing]
Richard Olney II (Dedham)	Democratic	March 4, 1915 – March 3, 1921	64th 65th 66th	Elected in 1914. Re-elected in 1916. Re-elected in 1918. Lost re-election.	1913–1923 [data missing]
Louis A. Frothingham (Easton)	Republican	March 4, 1921 – August 23, 1928	67th 68th 69th 70th	Elected in 1920. Re-elected in 1922. Re-elected in 1924. Re-elected in 1926. Died.	1913–1923 [data missing]
Louis A. Frothingham (Easton)	Republican	March 4, 1921 – August 23, 1928	67th 68th 69th 70th	Elected in 1920. Re-elected in 1922. Re-elected in 1924. Re-elected in 1926. Died.	1923–1933 [data missing]
Vacant		August 24, 1928 – November 5, 1928	70th		1923–1933 [data missing]
Richard B. Wigglesworth (Milton)	Republican	November 6, 1928 – March 3, 1933	70th 71st 72nd	Elected to finish Frothingham's term. Re-elected in 1928. Re-elected in 1930. Redistricted to the 13th district.	1923–1933 [data missing]
Joseph W. Martin Jr. (North Attleborough)	Republican	March 4, 1933 – January 3, 1963	73rd 74th 75th 76th 77th 78th 79th 80th 81st 82nd 83rd 84th 85th 86th 87th	Redistricted from the 15th district and re-elected in 1932. Re-elected in 1934. Re-elected in 1936. Re-elected in 1938. Re-elected in 1940. Re-elected in 1942. Re-elected in 1944. Re-elected in 1946. Re-elected in 1948. Re-elected in 1950. Re-elected in 1952. Re-elected in 1954. Re-elected in 1956. Re-elected in 1958. Re-elected in 1960. Redistricted to the 10th district.	1933–1943 [data missing]
Joseph W. Martin Jr. (North Attleborough)	Republican	March 4, 1933 – January 3, 1963	73rd 74th 75th 76th 77th 78th 79th 80th 81st 82nd 83rd 84th 85th 86th 87th	Redistricted from the 15th district and re-elected in 1932. Re-elected in 1934. Re-elected in 1936. Re-elected in 1938. Re-elected in 1940. Re-elected in 1942. Re-elected in 1944. Re-elected in 1946. Re-elected in 1948. Re-elected in 1950. Re-elected in 1952. Re-elected in 1954. Re-elected in 1956. Re-elected in 1958. Re-elected in 1960. Redistricted to the 10th district.	1943–1953 [data missing]
Joseph W. Martin Jr. (North Attleborough)	Republican	March 4, 1933 – January 3, 1963	73rd 74th 75th 76th 77th 78th 79th 80th 81st 82nd 83rd 84th 85th 86th 87th	Redistricted from the 15th district and re-elected in 1932. Re-elected in 1934. Re-elected in 1936. Re-elected in 1938. Re-elected in 1940. Re-elected in 1942. Re-elected in 1944. Re-elected in 1946. Re-elected in 1948. Re-elected in 1950. Re-elected in 1952. Re-elected in 1954. Re-elected in 1956. Re-elected in 1958. Re-elected in 1960. Redistricted to the 10th district.	1953–1963 [data missing]
District eliminated January 3, 1963

U.S. House of Representatives
Preceded by Texas's 4th congressional district	Home district of the speaker of the House; January 3, 1947 – January 3, 1949	Succeeded by Texas's 4th congressional district
Preceded by Texas's 4th congressional district	Home district of the speaker of the House; January 3, 1953 – January 3, 1955	Succeeded by Texas's 4th congressional district
