= Benjamin Greene (politician) =

American politician

Benjamin Greene (May 5, 1764 – October 15, 1837) was an American politician from Maine. Greene spent one term in the Maine House of Representatives in 1824. During his term, he served as Speaker of the House. He was a resident of South Berwick in York County.

Greene was born in Waltham, Massachusetts on May 5, 1764, and graduated from Harvard in 1784, where he studied divinity. He became a Unitarian minister in Medway, Massachusetts in 1788. In 1797 or 1798, Greene was hired as principal of Berwick Academy. He studied law with Dudley Hubbard and was admitted to the Maine Bar in 1801. He was a candidate in the 1801 Massachusetts's 14th congressional district special election, finishing last of three candidates with just under 10% of the vote. He died in Athens, Maine on October 15, 1837.
