= Jabez Upham =

American politician

Member of the U.S. House of Representatives from Massachusetts's 10th district
- In office March 4, 1807 – 1810
- Preceded by: Seth Hastings
- Succeeded by: Joseph Allen

Personal details
- Born: August 23, 1764 Brookfield, Province of Massachusetts Bay, British America
- Died: November 8, 1811 (aged 47) Brookfield, Massachusetts, U.S.
- Party: Federalist
- Relations: Horace Gray (grandson)
- Education: Harvard University

Jabez Upham (August 23, 1764 – November 8, 1811) was a U.S. representative from Massachusetts, brother of George Baxter Upham, and cousin of Charles Wentworth Upham, both were also U.S. representatives.

Born in Brookfield in the Province of Massachusetts Bay, Upham graduated from Harvard University in 1785. He studied law, was admitted to the bar and commenced practice in Sturbridge, Massachusetts.

He moved to Claremont, New Hampshire, and then to Brookfield, Massachusetts, where he continued the practice of law. He served as member of the Massachusetts House of Representatives from 1804 to 1806 and in 1811.

Upham was elected as a Federalist to the Tenth and Eleventh Congresses, and served from March 4, 1807, until his resignation in 1810.

He died in Brookfield, Massachusetts, November 8, 1811. He was interred in New Cemetery, West Brookfield, Massachusetts.

Jabez Upham was the grandfather of Horace Gray, a Supreme Court judge.

U.S. House of Representatives
Preceded by Seth Hastings	Member of the U.S. House of Representatives from Massachusetts's 10th congressional district 1807–1810	Succeeded by Joseph Allen
