= Abraham Baldwin =

American Founding Father and politician (1754–1807)

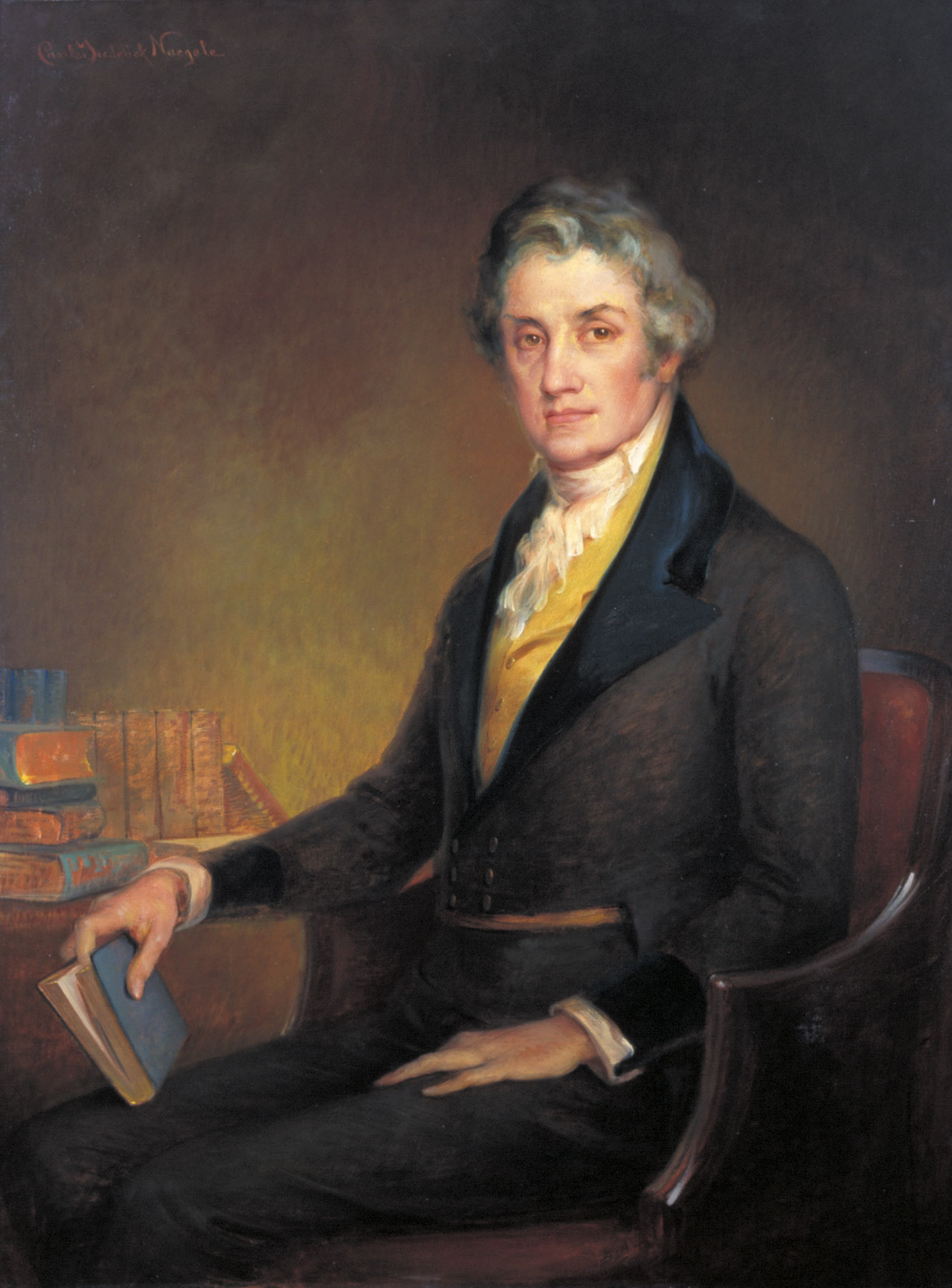
- Portrait by Charles Frederick Naegele

President pro tempore of the United States Senate
- In office December 7, 1801 – December 14, 1802
- Preceded by: James Hillhouse
- Succeeded by: Stephen R. Bradley

United States Senator from Georgia
- In office March 4, 1799 – March 3, 1807
- Preceded by: Josiah Tattnall
- Succeeded by: George Jones

Member of the U.S. House of Representatives from Georgia
- In office March 4, 1789 – March 4, 1799
- Preceded by: District established
- Succeeded by: James Jones
- Constituency: 2nd district (1789–1793) at-large district (1793–1799)

1st President of the University of Georgia
- In office 1785–1801
- Preceded by: Position established
- Succeeded by: Josiah Meigs

Delegate from Georgia to the Congress of the Confederation
- In office 1787–1788
- In office 1785

Personal details
- Born: November 22, 1754 Guilford, Connecticut Colony, British America
- Died: March 4, 1807 (aged 52) Washington, D.C., U.S.
- Resting place: Rock Creek Cemetery; Washington, D.C., U.S.
- Relatives: Henry Baldwin (half-brother)
- Education: Yale College

Abraham Baldwin (November 22, 1754 – March 4, 1807) was an American minister, patriot, politician, and Founding Father who signed the United States Constitution. Born and raised in Connecticut, he was a 1772 graduate of Yale College. After the Revolutionary War, Baldwin became a lawyer. He moved to the U.S. state of Georgia in the mid-1780s and founded the University of Georgia. Baldwin was a member of Society of the Cincinnati.

Baldwin served as a United States Senator from Georgia from 1799 to 1807. During his tenure, he served as President pro tempore of the United States Senate from 1801 to 1802.

== Early life, education and career ==
Abraham Baldwin was born in 1754 in Guilford in the Connecticut Colony into a large family, the son of Lucy (Dudley) and Michael Baldwin, a blacksmith, and descended from Elder John Strong. His half-brother, Henry Baldwin, was an Associate Justice of the Supreme Court of the United States. After attending Guilford Grammar School, Abraham Baldwin attended Yale College in nearby New Haven, Connecticut, where he was a member of the Linonian Society. He graduated in 1772.

Three years later after theological study, he was licensed as a Congregationalist minister. He also served as a tutor at the college. He held that position until 1779. During the American Revolutionary War, he served as a chaplain in the Connecticut Contingent of the Continental Army. He did not see combat while with the Continental troops. Two years later at the conclusion of the war, Baldwin declined an offer from Yale's new president, Ezra Stiles, to become Professor of Divinity. Instead, he turned to the study of law and in 1783 was admitted to the Connecticut bar.

== Move to Georgia ==
Encouraged by his former commanding officer General Nathanael Greene, who had acquired the plantation at Mulberry Grove where Eli Whitney would later invent the cotton gin, Baldwin moved to Georgia. He was recruited by fellow Yale alumnus Governor Lyman Hall, another transplanted New Englander, to develop a state education plan. Baldwin was named the first president of the University of Georgia and became active in politics to build support for the university, which had not yet enrolled its first student. He was appointed as a delegate to the Congress of the Confederation and then to the Constitutional Convention; in September 1786 he was one of the state’s two signatories to the U.S. Constitution.

Baldwin remained president of the University of Georgia during its initial development phase until 1800. During this period, he also worked with the legislature on the college charter. In 1801, Franklin College, the University of Georgia's initial college, opened to students. Josiah Meigs was hired to succeed Baldwin as first acting president and oversee the inaugural class of students. The first buildings of the college were architecturally modeled on Baldwin's and Meigs's alma mater of Yale where they both had taught. (Later the university sports team adopted as its mascot the bulldog, also in tribute to Baldwin and Meigs, as it is the mascot of Yale.)

== Politics ==
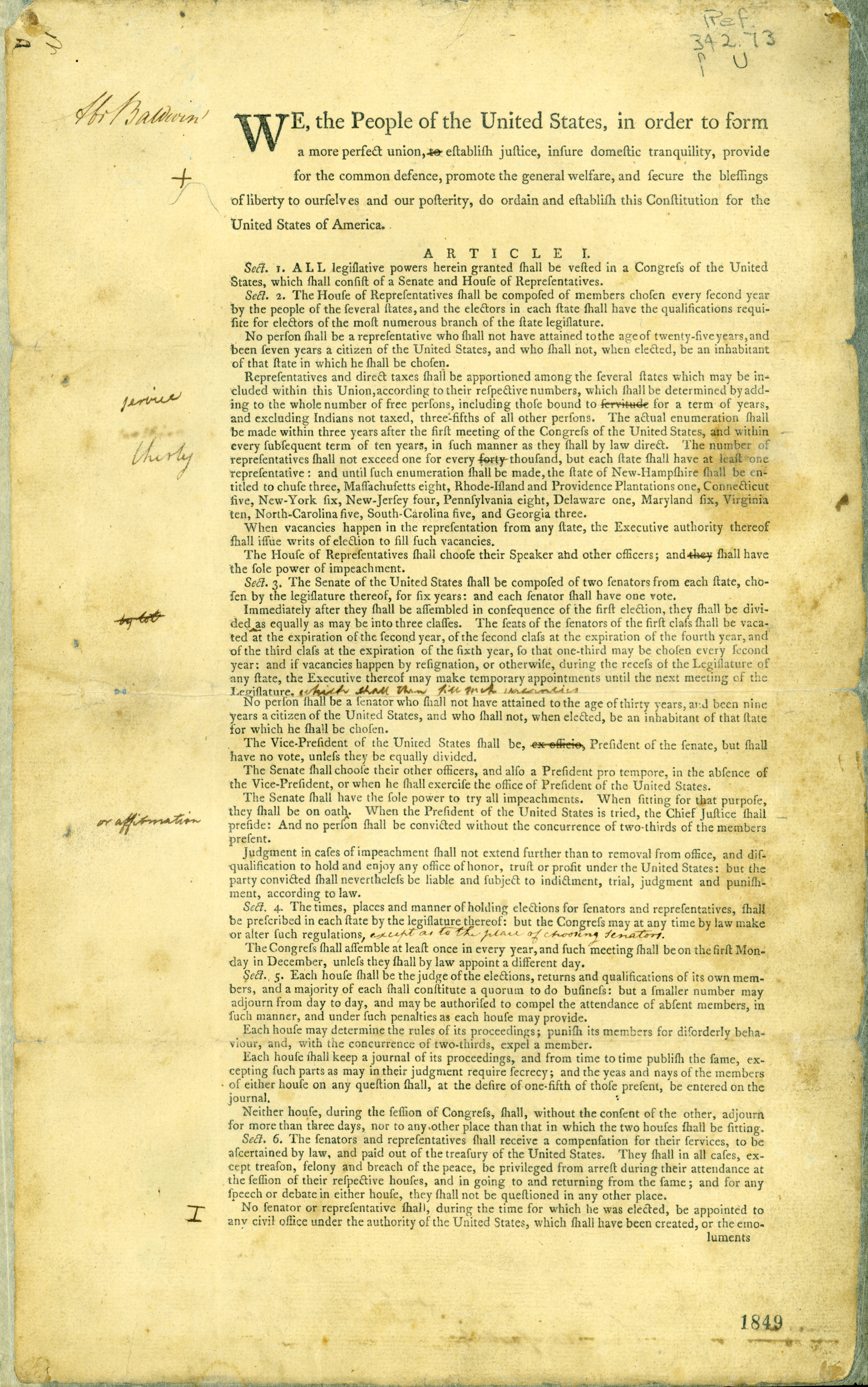
Baldwin's draft copy of the U.S. Constitution is held by the Georgia Historical Society. It is the second printed draft of the Constitution, printed by Dunlap and Claypoole on four folio leaves complete with Baldwin's signature and marginal notes. This second draft was produced by a Committee of Style and Arrangement, consisting of Alexander Hamilton, William Samuel Johnson, Rufus King, James Madison, and Gouverneur Morris. It is one of only a handful still in existence.

Baldwin was elected to the Georgia Assembly, where he became very active, working to develop support for the college. He was able to mediate between the rougher frontiersmen, perhaps because of his childhood as the son of a blacksmith, and the aristocratic planter elite who dominated the coastal Lowcountry. He became one of the most prominent legislators, pushing significant measures such as the education bill through the sometimes split Georgia Assembly.

He was elected as representative to the U.S. Congress in 1788. The Georgia legislature elected him as U.S. Senator in 1799 (this was the practice until popular election in 1913). He served as president pro tempore of the United States Senate from December 1801 to December 1802. He was re-elected and served in office until his death.

== Death and legacy ==
Baldwin's grave in Rock Creek Cemetery

On March 4, 1807, at age 52, Baldwin died while serving as a U.S. senator from Georgia. Later that month the Savannah Republican and Savannah Evening Ledger reprinted an obituary that had first been published in a Washington, D.C., newspaper: "He originated the plan of The University of Georgia, drew up the charter, and with infinite labor and patience, in vanquishing all sorts of prejudices and removing every obstruction, he persuaded the assembly to adopt it." His remains are interred at Rock Creek Cemetery in Washington, DC.

- The United States Postal Service made a 7¢ Great Americans series postage stamp in his honor;
- Places and institutions were named for him, including:
  - Baldwin County in Alabama and Georgia;
  - Abraham Baldwin Agricultural College in Tifton, Georgia;
  - Abraham Baldwin Middle School in Guilford, Connecticut;
  - Baldwin streets in Madison, Wisconsin and Athens, Georgia.
- The University of Georgia erected a statue of Baldwin on the historic North Campus quad in his honor as its founding father.

== Bibliography ==
- White, Henry Clay (1926). Abraham Baldwin: One of the Founders of the Republic, and Father of the University of Georgia, the First of American State Universities. McGregor Company.

== See also ==
- List of members of the United States Congress who died in office (1790–1899)

U.S. House of Representatives
Preceded by New Seat	Member of the U.S. House of Representatives from Georgia's 2nd congressional district March 4, 1789 – March 4, 1793	Succeeded by Converted to At-Large districts
Preceded by Converted from district seats	Member of the U.S. House of Representatives from Georgia's at-large congressional district March 4, 1793 – March 4, 1799	Succeeded by James Jones
U.S. Senate
Preceded by Josiah Tattnall	U.S. senator (Class 2) from Georgia; March 4, 1799 – March 4, 1807; Served alongside: James Gunn, James Jackson, John Milledge	Succeeded by George Jones
Political offices
Preceded by James Hillhouse	President pro tempore of the United States Senate; December 7, 1801 – December 13, 1802	Succeeded by Stephen R. Bradley
