= 1800 Virginia's 13th congressional district special election =

A special election was held in Virginia's 13th congressional district on July 31, 1800, to fill a vacancy left by the resignation, on June 7, 1800, of John Marshall (F), who was named Secretary of State by President John Adams.

== Election results ==
Candidate	Party	Votes	Percent
Littleton W. Tazewell	Democratic-Republican	778	64.5%
John Mayo	Federalist	428	35.5%

Tazewell took his seat November 26, 1800

== See also ==
- List of special elections to the United States House of Representatives
