= 1801 Pennsylvania's 12th congressional district special election =

A special election was held in Pennsylvania's 12th congressional district on October 13, 1801, to fill a vacancy caused by the resignation of Albert Gallatin (DR) in May, 1801, prior to the first meeting of the 7th Congress, after being appointed Secretary of the Treasury.

== Election results ==
Candidate	Party	Votes	Percent
William Hoge	Democratic-Republican	4,687	82.6%
Alexander Fowler	Federalist	836	14.7%
Isaac Weaver	Democratic-Republican	154	2.7%

== See also ==
- List of special elections to the United States House of Representatives
