= Seth Hastings =

American politician

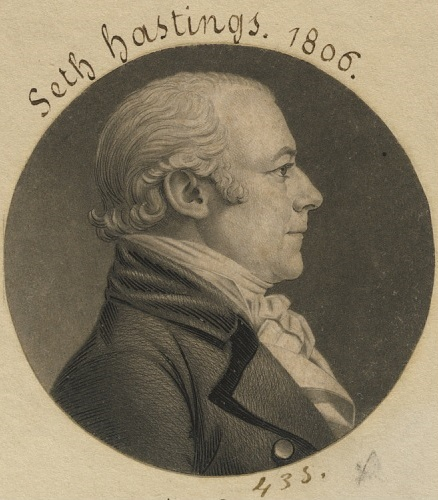

Member of the U.S. House of Representatives from Massachusetts
- In office August 24, 1801 – March 3, 1807
- Preceded by: Levi Lincoln Sr.
- Succeeded by: Jabez Upham
- Constituency: 4th district (1801–03); 10th district (1803–07)

Personal details
- Born: April 7, 1762 Cambridge, Province of Massachusetts Bay, British America
- Died: November 19, 1831 (aged 69) Mendon, Massachusetts, U.S.
- Party: Federalist
- Education: Harvard University
- Occupation: Lawyer

Seth Hastings (April 8, 1762 – November 19, 1831) was a United States representative from Massachusetts. Born in Cambridge in the Province of Massachusetts Bay to Seth and Hannah (Soden) Hastings, he was a descendant of the colonist Thomas Hastings who came from the East Anglia region of England to the Massachusetts Bay Colony in 1634. He graduated from Harvard University in 1782, studied law, was admitted to the bar in 1786 and commenced practice in Mendon, Massachusetts. He was town treasurer in 1794 and 1795, and was elected one of the first school commissioners in 1796.

Hastings was elected as a Federalist to the Seventh Congress to fill the vacancy caused by the resignation of Levi Lincoln. He was reelected to the Eighth and Ninth Congresses and served from August 24, 1801, to March 3, 1807. He declined to be a candidate for renomination in 1806 and was a member of the Massachusetts State Senate in 1810 and 1814. From 1819 to 1828, he was chief justice of the court of sessions for Worcester County. Hastings died in Mendon; interment was in the Old Cemetery.

== Legacy ==
Hastings' son, William Soden Hastings, also represented Massachusetts in the House of Representatives.

U.S. House of Representatives
Preceded by Levi Lincoln Sr.	Member of the U.S. House of Representatives from Massachusetts's 4th congressional district August 24, 1801 – March 3, 1803	Succeeded by Joseph B. Varnum
Preceded by Nathan Read	Member of the U.S. House of Representatives from Massachusetts's 10th congressional district March 4, 1803 – March 3, 1807	Succeeded by Jabez Upham
