= James Jones (Georgia politician) =

American politician

Member of the U.S. House of Representatives from Georgia's at-large district
- In office March 4, 1799 – January 11, 1801
- Preceded by: Abraham Baldwin
- Succeeded by: John Milledge

Member of the Georgia House of Representatives
- In office 1797 - 1799

Personal details
- Born: James Jones Maryland
- Died: Washington, D.C.
- Resting place: Congressional Cemetery
- Party: Federalist Party
- Profession: lawyer

James Jones (died January 11, 1801) was an American politician and lawyer from the state of Georgia.

== Early years and education ==
Jones moved with his uncle to Georgia in 1740. He studied law in Savannah, Georgia, and gained admission to the state bar and became a practicing attorney. In 1790, he also served as a first lieutenant in the Georgia Militia.

== Political career ==
Elected to the Georgia House of Representatives in 1796, Jones was re-elected in 1798 but later resigned. While seeking re-election to the Georgia House of Representatives, Jones simultaneously ran for a seat in the United States House of Representatives. In the election of 1798, Georgia used a statewide at-large method to elect two members to serve in the 6th Congress of the United States. Jones received 4,264 votes (37.3%), ahead of the second-place finisher, Benjamin Taliaferro, who received 3,823 votes (33.4%). Both Jones and Taliaferro ran as candidates on the Federalist Party ticket. The incumbent, Abraham Baldwin, running as a Democratic-Republican, came in a distant third with 3,135 votes (27.4%) Jones resigned from the Georgia General Assembly and took his seat in Congress instead. In 1798, Jones also served on the state constitutional convention.

== Death and legacy ==
Jones died while still serving in that position in 1801 and was buried in the Congressional Cemetery in Washington, D.C. Jones County, Georgia, was named in his honor.

== See also ==
- List of members of the United States Congress who died in office (1790–1899)

U.S. House of Representatives
Preceded by Abraham Baldwin	Member of the U.S. House of Representatives from Georgia's at-large congressional district March 4, 1799 – January 11, 1801	Succeeded by John Milledge
