= George Thatcher =

American judge (1754–1824)

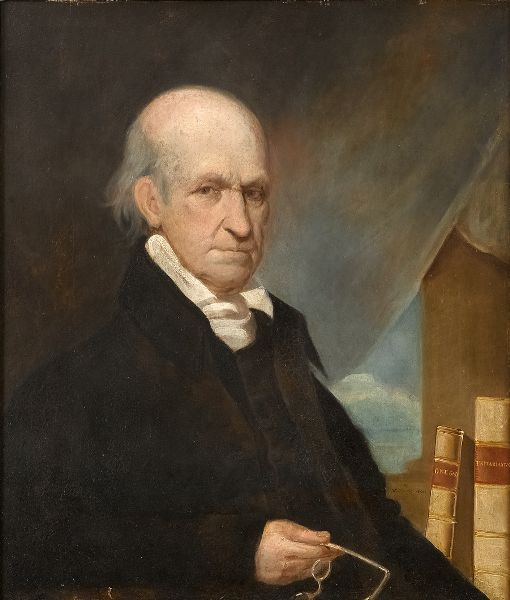
- portrait by Henry Williams

Dean of the United States House of Representatives
- In office December 21, 1800 – March 4, 1801
- Preceded by: Frederick Muhlenberg
- Succeeded by: Nathaniel Macon

Member of the U.S. House of Representatives from Massachusetts
- In office March 4, 1789 – March 3, 1791
- Preceded by: District established
- Succeeded by: George Leonard
- Constituency: 6th district
- In office April 4, 1791 – March 3, 1801
- Preceded by: Jonathan Grout
- Succeeded by: Richard Cutts
- Constituency: 8th district (1791–1793); 4th district (1793–1795); 14th district (1795–1801)

Personal details
- Born: April 12, 1754 Yarmouth, Province of Massachusetts Bay, British America
- Died: April 6, 1824 (aged 69) Biddeford, Maine, U.S.
- Party: Federalist
- Education: Harvard College
- Occupation: Lawyer

George Thatcher (sometimes spelled Thacher; April 12, 1754 – April 6, 1824) was an American lawyer, jurist, and statesman from the Maine district of Massachusetts. He was a delegate for Massachusetts to the Continental Congress in 1787 and 1788. He was an associate justice of the Massachusetts Supreme Judicial Court from 1801 to 1824.

== Life ==
Thatcher was born April 12, 1754, in Yarmouth in the Province of Massachusetts Bay. After private tutoring, he attended Harvard, graduating in 1776. He read law and was admitted to the bar in 1778, and then moved to York in Massachusetts' District of Maine to open a practice. By 1782 he had settled in Biddeford.

Thatcher was named as one of the Massachusetts delegates to the Continental Congress in 1787. He wrote under the name "Scribble Scrabble."

== Congressman ==
He was later elected a U.S. Congressman from the Maine district of Massachusetts, as a Pro-administration candidate in 1789 to 1792 and as a Federalist from 1794 to 1801. He did not seek re-election in 1800. At the time he left the Congress, he was the last original Congressman still in office.

=== Fugitive Slave Act ===
In 1788 North Carolina passed a law allowing the capture and sale of any former slave who had been freed without court approval. Many freed African Americans fled the state to avoid being captured and sold back into slavery. Rev Absalom Jones drafted a petition on behalf of four freed slaves, the first group of African Americans to petition the U.S. Congress. The petition related to the 1793 Fugitive Slave Act, which Thatcher was one of seven representatives to vote against, and asked Congress to adopt “some remedy for an evil of such magnitude.”

The petition was presented on January 30, 1797, by U.S. Representative John Swanwick of Pennsylvania. Although Representative Thatcher argued that the petition should be accepted and referred to the Committee on the Fugitive Law, the House of Representatives declined to accept the petition by a vote of was 50 to 33. In March 1798 Rep. Thatcher renewed debate on the issue of the "rights of man".

== Later career ==
Thatcher accepted an appointment to a Massachusetts state court in 1792 and served until 1800 when he was appointed to the state's Supreme Judicial Court. During the organization of Maine's statehood in 1819, he was a member of the convention that created the new state's constitution. When statehood was achieved in 1820, he moved to Newburyport, Massachusetts. He resigned from the court in January 1824, and retired to Biddeford, Maine.

Thatcher, an ardent Unitarian, helped to sponsor the creation of Bowdoin College so that Maine would have its own institution of higher education. For the college's first dozen years, he served as a regent.

Thatcher was elected a member of the American Antiquarian Society in 1814, and served on its board of councilors from 1815 to 1819. In Commonwealth vs Griffith, (MA 1823), Thatcher argued that the law of Massachusetts did not consider any person to be a slave.

Thatcher died at his home, and is buried in the Woodlawn Cemetery at Biddeford.

U.S. House of Representatives
New seat	Member of the U.S. House of Representatives from Massachusetts's 6th congressional district (Maine district); March 4, 1789 – March 3, 1791	Succeeded by George Leonard
Preceded by Jonathan Grout	Member of the U.S. House of Representatives from Massachusetts's 8th congressional district (Maine district); April 4, 1791 – March 3, 1793	district eliminated
Preceded by Theodore Sedgwick	Member of the U.S. House of Representatives from Massachusetts's 4th congressional district (Maine district); March 4, 1793 – March 3, 1795 alongside: Henry Dearborn, Peleg Wadsworth on a General ticket	Succeeded by Dwight Foster
New district	Member of the U.S. House of Representatives from Massachusetts's 14th congressional district (Maine district); 1795–1801	Succeeded by Richard Cutts
Legal offices
New seat	Associate Justice of the Massachusetts Supreme Judicial Court; 1801–1824	Succeeded by Levi Lincoln Jr.
