= John Bird (New York politician) =

American politician

Member of the U.S. House of Representatives from New York's 6th district
- In office March 4, 1799 – July 25, 1801
- Preceded by: Hezekiah L. Hosmer
- Succeeded by: John P. Van Ness

Personal details
- Born: November 22, 1768 Litchfield, Connecticut
- Died: February 2, 1806 (aged 37) Troy, New York
- Party: Federalist
- Spouses: Eunice Porter Bird; Sally Buel Bird
- Education: Yale College
- Profession: Lawyer; Politician

John Bird (November 22, 1768 – February 2, 1806) was an American politician who served as a United States representative from New York.

== Biography ==
Born in Litchfield, Connecticut, Bird was the son of Dr. Seth and Hanna Sheldon Bird and pursued classical studies; graduated from Yale College in 1786, studied law, was admitted to the bar, and commenced practice in Litchfield. He married Eunice Porter on October 4, 1789. The marriage ended in 1797 divorce, which was granted to Eunice from the Connecticut General Assembly on the grounds of ill treatment by her husband. His second marriage was to Sally Buel on March 29, 1799.

Bird was a slave owner.

== Career ==
Bird moved to Troy, New York in 1793 and engaged in the practice of law. He was a member of the New York State Assembly from 1796 to 1798, and a member of the Freemasons.

Elected as a Federalist to the Sixth and Seventh Congresses as U. S. Representative for the sixth District of New York, Bird served from March 4, 1799 to July 25, 1801, when he resigned, and resumed the practice of his profession.

== Death ==
Bird died in Troy, Rensselaer County, New York, February 2, 1806 (age 37 years, 72 days). He is interred at Mt. Ida Cemetery, Troy, New York.

U.S. House of Representatives
Preceded by Hezekiah L. Hosmer	Member of the U.S. House of Representatives from New York's 6th congressional district March 4, 1799 – July 25, 1801	Succeeded by John P. Van Ness
