= Senator Fay =

Senator Fay may refer to:

- Francis B. Fay (1793–1876), Massachusetts State Senate
- Frank B. Fay (1821–1904), Massachusetts State Senate
- John J. Fay Jr. (1927–2003), New Jersey State Senate
- Wallace M. Fay (1896–1976), Vermont State Senate
