= Alan Silvia =

American politician

Member of the Massachusetts House of Representatives from the 7th Bristol district
- Incumbent
- Assumed office January 2, 2013
- Preceded by: Kevin Aguiar

Personal details
- Born: October 11, 1951 (age 74) Fall River, Massachusetts
- Party: Democratic
- Education: Northeastern University; Salve Regina University
- Occupation: Politician, police officer

Alan Silvia is an American state legislator representing the 7th Bristol District in the Massachusetts House of Representatives since 2013 as a member of the Democratic Party.

== Early life and education ==
Silvia was born on October 11, 1951, in Fall River, Massachusetts. Silvia served in the United States Marine Corps from 1970 to 1972 and later pursued higher education, obtaining a bachelor's degree in criminal justice from Northeastern University in 1976 and a master's degree in human development and administration from Salve Regina University in 1986. Silvia served in the Fall River Police Department for over twenty years as a patrolman and later a detective, retiring in 1998.

== Political career ==
Following the election of Robert Correia as Mayor of Fall River in 2007, Silvia was designated chairman of Correia's "Inaugural Gala Committee" and later received an appointment to the Fall River Planning Board from Correia in July 2008. On March 1, 2010, Silvia announced he was challenging incumbent State Representative Kevin Aguiar (D-7th Bristol) in the Democratic primary, citing Aguiar's "lack of communication" with South End residents as the impetus for his campaign. On September 6, 2010, Silvia was defeated by Aguiar by only 280 votes, with Aguiar going on to win reelection over his Republican opponent. The following year, Silvia was again involved in city-level politics when he served as campaign manager for Cathy Ann Viveiros during her unsuccessful campaign against Mayor William A. Flanagan.

=== State representative ===
In 2012, Silvia announced he would again challenge Rep. Aguiar in the Democratic primary, with the absence of Republican or other candidates meaning the winner would be assured election in November. On September 6, 2012, preliminary results saw Silvia leading Aguiar by only seven votes: 2,091 to 2,084; with both candidates expressing concerns about the integrity of the ballots and Aguiar declaring he would pursue a recount. A recount process proceeded, with the final certified results reaffirming Silvia's victory over Aguiar; the margin expanding to 26 votes for a final total of 2,153 over 2,127. Silvia was unopposed in the 2012 general election, and did not have any opposition in 2014 and 2016.

During his first term in the General Court, Silvia was fined twice in relation to actions of his 2012 campaign committee, paying a $400 fine in February for appointing a public employee as his campaign treasurer, with an additional $20,000 in fines levied by the OCPF in August due to campaign finance violations.

In 2018, Ian Tompkins, a candidate for the Fall River City Council a year prior, announced he would challenge Silvia in the general election as a member of the Green-Rainbow Party, but ultimately dropped out of the race on August 29 and did not appear on the ballot, leaving Silvia unopposed for the fourth consecutive general election.

Silvia visited Israel for the 50 States One Israel conference.

== See also ==
- 2019–2020 Massachusetts legislature
- 2021–2022 Massachusetts legislature
