= Frank Fay =

Frank or Francis Fay may refer to:

- Francis B. Fay (1793–1876), American congressman from Massachusetts
- Frank B. Fay (1821–1904), American businessman and legislator from Massachusetts
- Frank Fay (Irish actor) (1870–1931), co-founder of Dublin's Abbey Theatre
- Frank Fay (American actor) (1891–1961), star of vaudeville, Broadway and film
- Frankie Fay (born 1931), American featherweight boxer knocked out by Buddy Hayes in 1949
