= John William Cummings =

John William Cummings may refer to:

- Jack Cummings (baseball) (1904–1963), Major League Baseball player
- John W. Cummings (1855–1929), American lawyer and politician
- Johnny Ramone (stage name) (1948–2004), American musician, member of the Ramones
