= List of selectmen of Fall River, Massachusetts =

Selectmen of Fall River, Massachusetts

The Town of Fall River, Massachusetts (also known as the Town of Troy, Massachusetts from 1804 to 1834) was led by a Board of Selectmen from 1803 until its re-incorporation as a city in 1854. Prior to 1803, it was a part of Freetown and was led by the Freetown Board of Selectmen.

== Selectmen (1803–1854) ==
Years	Selectman	Selectman	Selectman	Selectman	Selectman
1803–04	Thomas Borden	Benjamin Durfee	Robert Miller		
1804–05	Samuel Thurston	Benjamin Durfee	Robert Miller		
1805–06	Nathan Bowen	Pardon Davol	Elijah Blossom, Jr.		
1806–07	Jonathan Brownell	Abraham Bowen	Elijah Blossom, Jr.		
1807–08	Jonathan Brownell	Elijah Blossom	Stephen Leonard		
1808–09	Nathan Bowen	Henry Brightman	David Wilson		
1809–10	William Read, Jr.	Charles Durfee	David Wilson		
1810–11	William Read, Jr.	Charles Durfee	David Wilson		
1811–12	William Read, Jr.	Benjamin Bennett, 2nd	David Wilson		
1812–13	Hezekiah Wilson	William B. Canedy	William Borden		
1813–14	Isaac Winslow	William B. Canedy	William Borden		
1814–15	Benjamin W. Brown	Simon Hathaway	William Borden		
1815–16	Benjamin W. Brown	Sheffel Weaver	Bradford Durfee		
1816–17	William Ashley	Sheffel Weaver	William Read		
1817–18	William Ashley	Sheffel Weaver	Abraham Bowen		
1818–19	Benjamin W. Brown	Charles Pitman	James G. Bowen		
1819–20	Benjamin W. Brown	Charles Pitman	James G. Bowen		
1820–21	Benjamin W. Brown	Sheffel Weaver	Richard Borden, 2nd		
1821–22	Robert Miller	Charles Pitman	Enoch French		
1822–23	Robert Miller	Charles Pitman	Enoch French		
1823–24	Joseph E. Read	Benjamin W. Brown	Edmund Chace		
1824–25	Enoch French	Hezekiah Wilson	William Read		
1825–26	Enoch French	Hezekiah Wilson	William Read		
1826–27	Enoch French	Hezekiah Wilson	William Read		
1827–28	Enoch French	Hezekiah Wilson	William Read		
1828–29	Enoch French	Sheffel Weaver	William Read		
1829–30	Enoch French	Sheffel Weaver	William Read		
1830–31	John Eddy	Sheffel Weaver	William Read		
1831–32	Samuel Chace	Robinson Buffinton	William Ashley		
1832–33	Samuel Chace	Leonard Garfield	William Ashley		
1833–34	Samuel Chace	Matthew C. Durfee	Elijah Pierce		
1834–35	Samuel Chace	Azariah Shove	Smith Winslow		
1835–36	John Eddy	Israel Anthony	Luther Winslow		
1836–37	John Eddy	Israel Anthony	Luther Winslow		
1837–38	John Eddy	Israel Anthony	Luther Winslow		
1838–39	John Eddy	Israel Anthony	Luther Winslow		
1839–40	John Eddy	Israel Anthony	Russell Hathaway		
1840–41	Nathaniel B. Borden	Israel Anthony	William Read		
1841–42	Matthew C. Hathaway	Israel Anthony	William Read		
1842–43	Jervis Shove	Stephen K. Crary	George Brightman, 2nd		
1843–44	Jervis Shove	Israel Anthony	Perez Mason		
1844–45	Thomas D. Chaloner	Israel Anthony	Perez Mason		
1845–46	Thomas D. Chaloner	Israel Anthony	Perez Mason		
1846–47	Leander Borden	Israel Anthony	James M. Morton		
1847–48	Azariah Shove	Israel Anthony	Benjamin Earl		
1848–49	Benjamin Wardwell	Israel Anthony	Benjamin Earl		
1849–50	Thomas J. Pickering	David Perkins	Benjamin Earl		
1850–51	Thomas J. Pickering	David Perkins	Daniel Brown		
1851–52	Thomas J. Pickering	James Buffington	Daniel Brown		
1852–53	George O. Fairbanks	James Buffington	Azariah Shove	Leander Borden	Chester W. Greene
1853–54	George O. Fairbanks	James Buffington	Azariah Shove	Thomas T. Potter	Chester W. Greene

== See also ==
- List of mayors of Fall River, Massachusetts
- History of Fall River, Massachusetts
