= Henry K. Braley =

American politician (1850–1929)

Henry King Braley
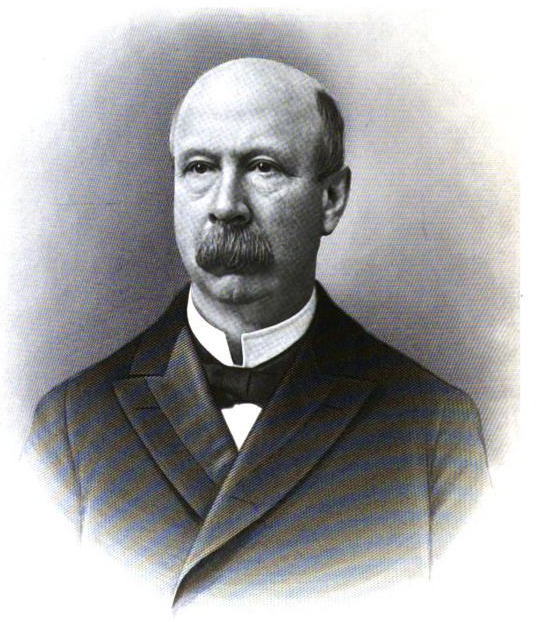

Associate Justice of the Massachusetts Supreme Judicial Court
- In office December 1902 – January 17, 1929
- Appointed by: Winthrop Murray Crane
- Preceded by: Marcus Perrin Knowlton

Justice of the Massachusetts Superior Court
- In office 1891–1902
- Appointed by: William Russell

Mayor of Fall River, Massachusetts
- In office 1882–1883
- Preceded by: Robert Henry
- Succeeded by: Milton Reed

Personal details
- Born: March 17, 1850 Rochester, Massachusetts
- Died: January 17, 1929 Boston, Massachusetts
- Party: Democratic
- Spouse: Caroline W. Leach
- Children: Abner L. Braley
- Profession: Attorney
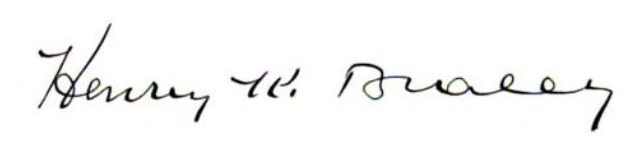
- Signature

Henry King Braley (March 17, 1850 – January 18, 1929) was an American politician who served as Mayor of Fall River, Massachusetts.

Braley was appointed as an associate justice of the Massachusetts Supreme Judicial Court in the place of Marcus Perrin Knowlton. Knowlton had been elevated to the position of Chief Justice of the Massachusetts Supreme Judicial Court after Oliver Wendell Holmes Jr. was appointed as an associate justice of the Supreme Court of the United States.

== Personal life ==
Braley was born in Rochester, Massachusetts to Samuel Tripp Braley and Mary A. (King) Braley on March 17, 1850. He got his early education at Pierce Academy and Rochester Academy. He was married to Caroline W. Leach on April 29, 1875 in Bridgewater, Massachusetts.

Legal offices
Preceded by Marcus Perrin Knowlton	Associate Justice of the Massachusetts Supreme Judicial Court; 1902–January 17, 1929	Succeeded by
Preceded by	Associate Justice of the Massachusetts Superior Court; 1892–1902	Succeeded by
Political offices
Preceded by Robert Henry	Mayor of Fall River, Massachusetts; 1882–1883	Succeeded by Milton Reed
