= Kevin Aguiar =

American politician

Member of the Massachusetts House of Representatives from the 7th Bristol district
- In office 2008 – January 2, 2013
- Preceded by: Robert Correia
- Succeeded by: Alan Silvia

Personal details
- Born: September 7, 1972 (age 53) Fall River, Massachusetts
- Party: Democratic
- Education: University of Massachusetts Dartmouth (BA); Cambridge College (CAGS, MA)
- Occupation: Assistant Principal

Kevin Aguiar (born September 7, 1972) is an American politician who represented the 7th Bristol district in the Massachusetts House of Representatives. He was first elected in a 2008 special election following Robert Correia's resignation to become Mayor of Fall River, Massachusetts.

From 2002 to 2009, Aguiar served as a member of the Fall School Committee. Aguiar returned to the school committee in 2017 and is still there currently He was defeated for re-election in the 2012 Democratic primary by challenger Alan Silvia, who succeeded him.
