= Joseph L. Hurley =

American politician (1898-1956)

Joseph Leo Hurley

Associate Justice of the Massachusetts Superior Court
- In office January 6, 1937 – April 29, 1956

52nd Lieutenant Governor of Massachusetts
- In office January 3, 1935 – January 7, 1937
- Governor: James Michael Curley
- Preceded by: Gaspar G. Bacon
- Succeeded by: Francis E. Kelly

Mayor of Fall River, Massachusetts
- In office 1933–1934
- Preceded by: Daniel F. Sullivan
- Succeeded by: Alexander C. Murray

Member of the Massachusetts House of Representatives Tenth Bristol District
- In office 1925–1928
- Preceded by: Edward F. Harrington
- Succeeded by: Francis Kearney

Personal details
- Born: April 20, 1898 Fall River, Massachusetts
- Died: April 29, 1956 (aged 58) Fall River, Massachusetts
- Party: Democratic
- Spouse: Celeste J. Tracy
- Education: Georgetown University LL.B. 1920; LL.M. 1921
- Profession: Attorney

Military service
- Branch/service: United States Army
- Rank: Private
- Battles/wars: World War I

Joseph Leo Hurley (April 20, 1898 – April 29, 1956) was an American Democratic politician who served as the 52nd lieutenant governor of Massachusetts from 1935 to 1937.

== Early life ==
Hurley was born to John and Margaret (Sullivan) Hurley on April 20, 1898, in Fall River, Massachusetts. Hurley was of Irish descent.

== Marriage and Children ==
Hurley married Celeste Tracy they had 3 children.

== See also ==
- 1925–1926 Massachusetts legislature
- 1927–1928 Massachusetts legislature

Party political offices
Preceded by John E. Swift	Democratic nominee for Lieutenant Governor of Massachusetts; 1934	Succeeded by Francis E. Kelly
Legal offices
Preceded by	Associate Justice of the Massachusetts Superior Court; January 6, 1937 – April 29, 1956	Succeeded by
Political offices
Preceded by Gaspar G. Bacon	Lieutenant Governor of Massachusetts; 1935 – 1937	Succeeded by Francis E. Kelly
Preceded by	Mayor of Fall River, Massachusetts; 1933 –1934	Succeeded by Alexander Clark Murray
