= Nathaniel Ruggles =

American politician

Member of the U.S. House of Representatives from Massachusetts's 13th district
- In office March 4, 1813 – March 3, 1819
- Preceded by: Ebenezer Seaver
- Succeeded by: Edward Dowse

Personal details
- Born: November 11, 1761 Roxbury, Province of Massachusetts Bay, British America
- Died: December 19, 1819 (aged 58) Roxbury, Massachusetts, U.S.
- Party: Federalist
- Education: Harvard University
- Profession: Lawyer

Coat of Arms of Nathaniel Ruggles

Nathaniel Ruggles (November 11, 1761 – December 19, 1819) was a U.S. representative from Massachusetts.

Born in Roxbury in the Province of Massachusetts Bay, Ruggles graduated from Harvard University in 1781, studied law, was admitted to the bar, and practiced law in his native town. He was appointed judge of the general sessions in 1807, and chief justice of Massachusetts in 1808. He was elected as a Federalist to the Thirteenth, Fourteenth, and Fifteenth Congresses (March 4, 1813 – March 3, 1819). He died in Roxbury on December 19, 1819.

U.S. House of Representatives
| Preceded by Ebenezer Seaver | Member of the U.S. House of Representatives from Massachusetts's 13th congressional district March 4, 1813 - March 3, 1819 | Succeeded by Edward Dowse |
