= Ebenezer Seaver =

American politician (1763–1844)

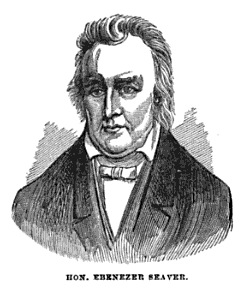

Member of the U.S. House of Representatives from Massachusetts's 13th district
- In office March 4, 1803 – March 3, 1813
- Preceded by: Peleg Wadsworth
- Succeeded by: Nathaniel Ruggles

Member of the Massachusetts House of Representatives
- In office 1794–1802; 1822–1823; 1826

Personal details
- Born: July 5, 1763 Roxbury, Province of Massachusetts Bay, British America
- Died: March 1, 1844 (aged 80) Roxbury, Massachusetts, U.S.
- Party: Democratic-Republican
- Education: Harvard University
- Occupation: Farming

Ebenezer Seaver (July 5, 1763 – March 1, 1844) was a U.S. representative from Massachusetts.

Born in Roxbury in the Province of Massachusetts Bay, Seaver graduated from Harvard University in 1784. He engaged in agricultural pursuits. He served as member of the State house of representatives 1794–1802.

Seaver was elected as a Democratic-Republican to the Eighth and to the four succeeding Congresses (March 4, 1803 – March 3, 1813). He was one of six Democratic-Republican representatives to oppose the Twelfth Amendment to the United States Constitution. Seaver was an unsuccessful candidate for reelection in 1812 to the Thirteenth Congress. He served as member of the Massachusetts Constitutional Convention of 1820–1821. He was again a member of the State house of representatives in 1822, 1823, and 1826. He died in Roxbury, Massachusetts, March 1, 1844.

U.S. House of Representatives
Preceded by Peleg Wadsworth	Member of the U.S. House of Representatives from Massachusetts's 13th congressional district March 4, 1803 - March 3, 1813	Succeeded by Nathaniel Ruggles
