= Edmond P. Talbot =

American politician

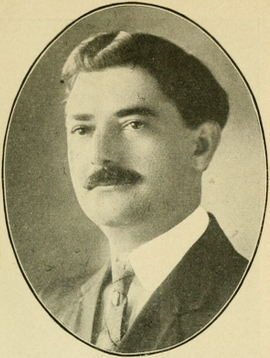

Mayor of Fall River, Massachusetts
- In office 1923–1926
- Preceded by: James H. Kay
- Succeeded by: W. Harry Monks
- In office 1929–1930
- Preceded by: W. Harry Monks
- Succeeded by: Daniel F. Sullivan

Sheriff of Bristol County, Massachusetts
- In office 1931–1933
- Preceded by: Isaac P. L. Willetts
- Succeeded by: Patrick H. Dupuis

Personal details
- Born: April 21, 1884 Tingwick, Quebec
- Died: 1951 (aged 66–67) Fall River, Massachusetts
- Party: Democratic
- Spouse: Alma Beaupre
- Children: 12
- Profession: Druggist

Edmond Patrick Talbot (1884–1951) was a Canadian-born American politician who served as Mayor of Fall River, Massachusetts, and Sheriff of Bristol County, Massachusetts. He was the Democratic nominee for Lieutenant Governor of Massachusetts in 1926.

== Early life ==
Talbot was born on April 21, 1884, in Tingwick, Quebec, to Charles and Celina Vital Talbot. The elder Talbot was a dairy farmer and Talbot was one of 14 children. In 1889 his family immigrated to the United States and settled in East Kingston, New York. In 1896 they moved to Fall River, where at the age of 13, Talbot went to work as a weaver the Davol Mills. Talbot also attended business college and worked evenings and Sundays in a drug store. In 1904 he became a licensed pharmacist in Rhode Island. However, he decided to return to Massachusetts and marry Alma Beaupre of Fall River. The couple wed on September 11, 1905, and would have twelve children together, eight of which survived childhood. That same year, Talbot was licensed in Massachusetts and purchased a pharmacy in Fall River. By 1926 he owned seven pharmacies in the city.

== Political career ==
=== Early work ===
In 1907, Talbot received his first political appointment when Mayor John T. Coughlin named him to the Fall River park commission. He remained on the board until 1915.

In 1913, Talbot ran for the Democratic nomination for the Massachusetts House of Representatives seat in the 6th Bristol District, but lost by 142 votes. He ran again in 1914 and was elected by 300 votes. During his year in the legislature, Talbot served on the committee labor, proposed refunding $1 million in tax revenue to the state's manufactures, and strongly advocated municipal home rule, especially in regards to appointive power of police and licensing commissions.

=== Mayor ===
In 1916, Talbot ran for Mayor of Fall River against Mayor James H. Kay, but lost by 3,600 votes. He ran again in 1920, but lost the Democratic nomination to William M. Sullivan by 243 votes.

In 1922, Talbot was again the Democratic nominee for Mayor of Fall River. In the general election he faced Republican Thomas N. Ashton, who defeated Kay in the primary. Kay's defeat aided Talbot, as Kay had been able to attract a number of French-Canadian supporters who would now support Talbot. On election day, Talbot topped Ashton by 1,867 votes. He was the city's first mayor of French-Canadian descent. However, the Republicans won a majority on the board of aldermen and were able to block all of Talbot's appointments and proposals.

In 1924, Talbot defeated Kay by 4,312 votes to win a second term. The Democrats won a 19 to 8 majority of the board of alderman, which gave the party control of the city for the first time in Fall River's history.

During his tenure as mayor, Talbot established the infant and maternal welfare commission, which established led to the creation of six clinics and a $40,000 appropriation for prenatal care and instruction for mothers. He also advocated for the abolishment of city's police commission, which was appointed by the governor (only Boston and Fall River had police heads appointed by the governor).

=== Run for Lt. Governor ===
In 1926, Harry J. Dooley and Joseph B. Ely competed for the Democratic nomination for lieutenant governor. On August 28, Dooley dropped out of the race and endorsed Ely, the candidate endorsed by party leadership, which would allow for more geographically balanced ticket. As Dooley did not exit the race before the August 13 deadline for withdrawals, his name remained on the ballot, however it was believed that Dooley's support of Ely would result in Ely easily winning the primary. Dooley ended up winning the primary, but refused the nomination as did Ely, who believed the means to be an embarrassment. Talbot was offered and accepted the nomination for lieutenant governor. Party leadership hoped that Talbot would help the ticket attract votes from the state's 75,000 to 80,000 French-speaking residents, 75% of which were believed to be Republican supporters. Talbot lost to Republican Frank G. Allen 57% to 40%. Talbot did not receive as large of a vote as expected and there was no evidence that he had been able to bring any French-Canadian voters to the Democratic ticket.

=== Return to city government ===
In 1928, Fall River switched to a Plan D Charter, which replaced the mayor-alderman form of government with a city manager-city council form of government. Talbot was elected mayor by 981 votes and the "Talbot slate" of candidates won a majority on the council. He was defeated for reelection by councilor Daniel F. Sullivan 18,326 votes to 16,457. Talbot's slate also lost all but one seat on the council.

=== Sheriff of Bristol County ===
On February 4, 1931, Governor Joseph B. Ely appointed Talbot to succeed the deceased Isaac P. L. Willetts as sheriff of Bristol County. He ran for a full term in 1932, but lost to Republican Patrick H. Dupuis 51% to 49%.

=== Later life ===
In 1934, Fall River switched back to a Plan A form of government and Talbot once again ran for mayor. He lost to city manager Alexander C. Murray. Talbot and Murray faced each other a second time in 1936 and Murray won again.

In 1944, Talbot was the Democratic nominee for the United States House of Representatives seat in Massachusetts's 14th congressional district. He lost to Republican incumbent Joseph W. Martin Jr. 62% to 38%.

In 1949, Talbot lost to incumbent Fall River mayor William P. Grant 24,588 votes to 19,393.

Talbot died in 1951 in Fall River.

== See also ==
- 1915 Massachusetts legislature

Party political offices
Preceded by John J. Cummings	Democratic nominee for Lieutenant Governor of Massachusetts; 1926	Succeeded by John F. Malley
