= Massachusetts's 2nd congressional district =

U.S. House district for Massachusetts

Coordinates: 42°23′06″N 72°07′07″W

- Interactive map of district boundaries since January 3, 2023
- Representative: Jim McGovern; D–Worcester
- Population (2025): 805,831
- Median household income: $103,962
- Ethnicity: 70.8% White; 11.1% Hispanic; 7.3% Asian; 5.3% Black; 4.3% Two or more races; 1.1% other
- Cook PVI: D+13

Massachusetts's 2nd congressional district is located in central Massachusetts, encompassing much of Franklin, Hampshire, and Worcester counties, as well as small portions of Middlesex and Norfolk Counties. The largest municipalities in the district include Worcester (which is the second-largest city in New England after Boston), Leominster, Amherst, Shrewsbury, and Northampton.

Democrat Jim McGovern has represented the district since 2013; he previously represented the 3rd district since 1997.

== Cities and towns represented ==
As of the 2021 redistricting, the 2nd district includes 68 municipalities:

Franklin County (22)

Ashfield, Bernardston, Buckland, Colrain, Conway, Deerfield, Erving, Gill, Greenfield, Heath, Leverett, Leyden, Montague, New Salem, Northfield, Orange, Shelburne, Shutesbury, Sunderland, Warwick, Wendell, Whately

Hampshire County (9)

Amherst, Chesterfield, Goshen, Hadley, Hatfield, Northampton, Pelham, Westhampton, Williamsburg

Middlesex County (3)

Ashland, Holliston, Hopkinton

Norfolk County (1)

Medway

Worcester County (33)

Athol, Auburn, Barre, Boylston, Douglas, Grafton, Hardwick, Holden, Hubbardston, Leicester, Leominster, Millbury, Northborough, Northbridge, Oakham, Petersham, Paxton, Phillipston, Princeton, Royalston, Rutland, Shrewsbury, Southborough, Sterling, Sutton, Templeton, Upton, Uxbridge, Webster (part; also 1st; includes part of Webster CDP), West Boylston, Westborough, Westminster (part; also 3rd), Worcester

=== History of District Boundaries ===
==== 1795 to 1803 ====
Known as the 2nd Western District.

==== 1803 to 1813 ====
Known as the "Essex North" district.

==== 1813 to 1833 ====
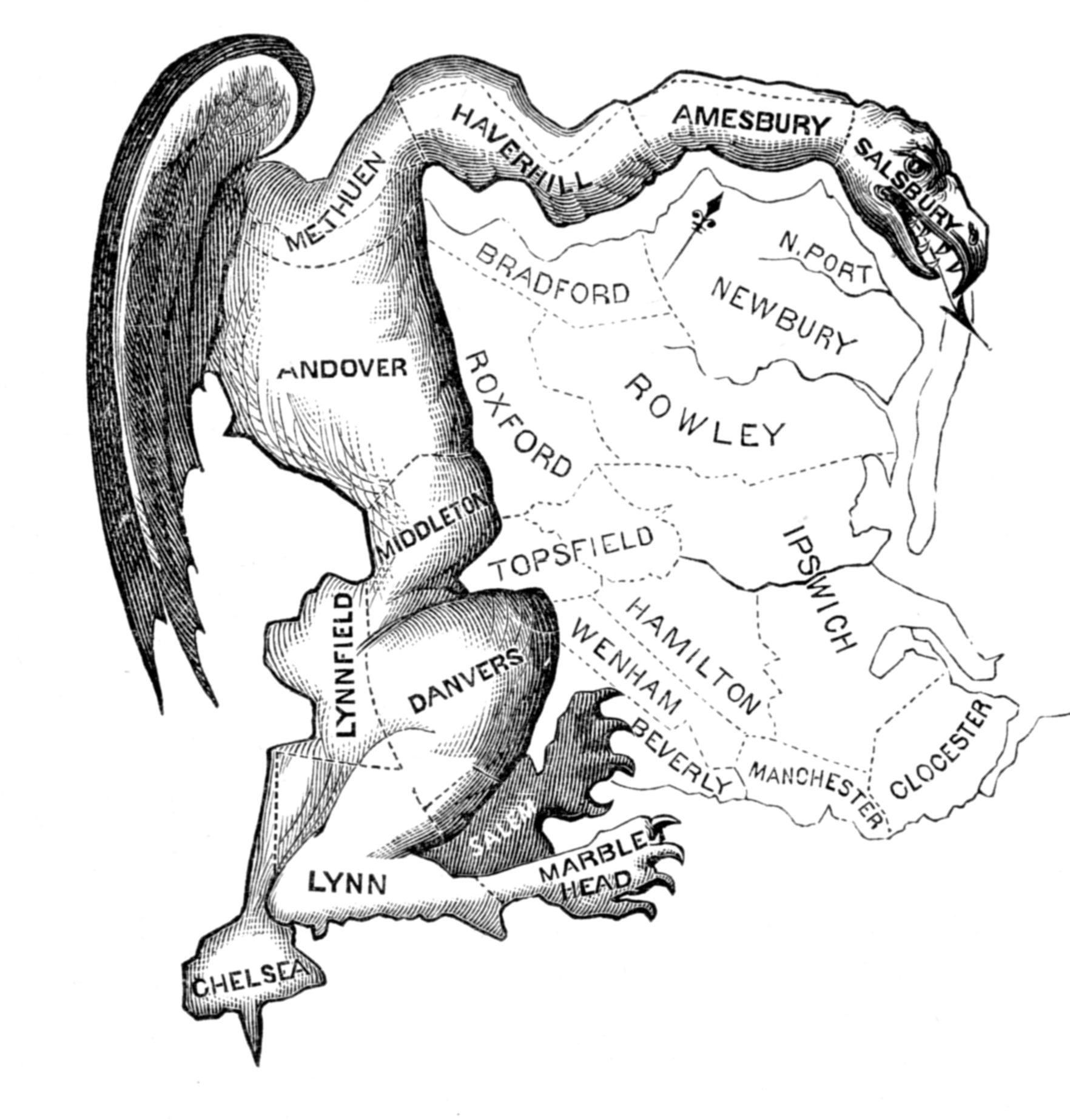
Tisdale's drawing of the Essex South district, turning the area that the district encompassed into a depiction of a dragon-like creature, building upon Richard Alsop's term, "Gerry-mander."

Known as the "Essex South" district. From 1813-1815, the district was shaped in such a way that poet and Federalist Richard Alsop described it as a "Gerry-mander" (a portmanteau of Gerry—the governor at the time—and salamander). Illustrator Elkanah Tisdale subsequently used the term as the basis for a political cartoon, which popularized it and led to "gerrymandering" being used to describe the practice of manipulating electoral district boundaries to gain a political advantage.

==== 1843 to 1853 ====
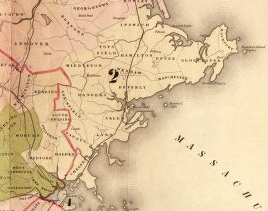
Detail of the district from 1843 to 1853.

The Act of September 16, 1842, established the district on the North Shore and New Hampshire border, with the following municipalities:

- In Essex County: Beverly, Danvers, Essex, Gloucester, Hamilton, Ipswich, Lynn, Lynnfield, Manchester, Marblehead, Middleton, Rockport, Salem, Saugus, Topsfield, and Wenham
- In Middlesex County: Malden, Medford, Reading, South Reading, and Stoneham
- In Suffolk County: Chelsea

==== 1860s ====
"Parts of the counties of Bristol, Norfolk, and Plymouth."

==== 1903 to 1913 ====
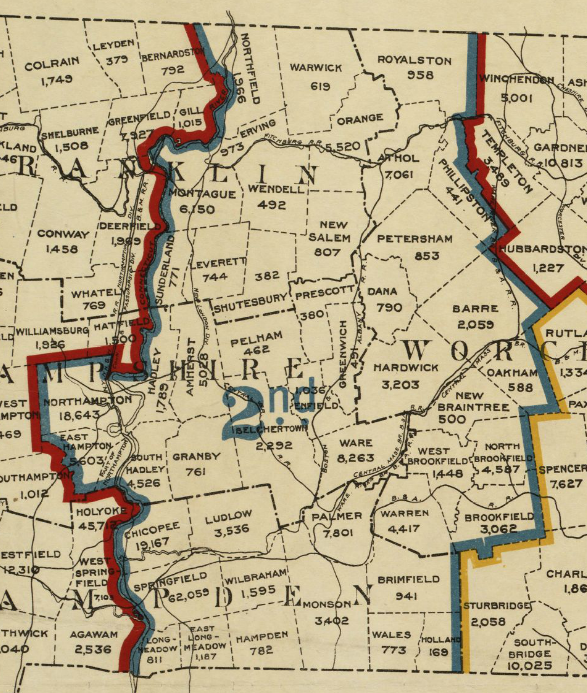
The district from 1903 to 1913.

During this decade, the district contained the following municipalities:

- In Franklin County: Erving, Leverett, Montague, New Salem, Northfield, Orange, Shutesbury, Sunderland, Warwick, and Wendell
- In Hampshire County: Amherst, Belchertown, Easthampton, Enfield, Granby, Hadley, Northampton, Pelham, Prescott, South Hadley, and Ware
- In Hampden County: Brimfield, Chicopee, East Longmeadow, Hampden, Holland, Longmeadow, Ludlow, Monson, Palmer, Springfield, Wales, and Wilbraham
- In Worcester County: Athol, Barre, Brookfield, Dana, Hardwick, New Braintree, North Brookfield, Oakham, Petersham, Phillipston, Royalston, Warren, and West Brookfield.

==== 1913 to 1923 ====
During this decade, the district contained the following municipalities:

- In Franklin County: Bernardston, Deerfield, Erving, Gill, Leverett, Montague, Northfield, Shutesbury, Sunderland, Warwick, Wendell, and Whately
- In Hampshire County: Amherst, Belchertown, Easthampton, Enfield, Granby, Hadley, Hatfield, Northampton, Pelham, South Hadley, Ware, and Williamsburg
- In Hampden County: Agawam, Chicopee, East Longmeadow, Hampden, Longmeadow, Ludlow, Springfield, West Springfield, and Wilbraham

==== 2003 to 2013 ====
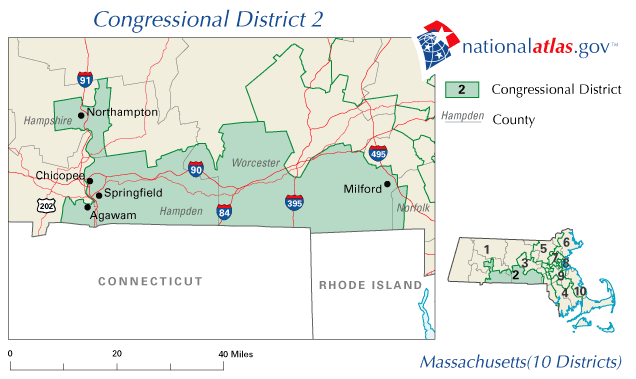
The district from 2003 to 2013

During this decade, the district contained the following municipalities:

- In Hampden County: Agawam, Brimfield, Chicopee, East Longmeadow, Hampden, Holland, Longmeadow, Ludlow, Monson, Palmer, Springfield, Wales, Wilbraham
- In Hampshire County: Hadley, Northampton, South Hadley
- In Norfolk County: Bellingham
- In Worcester County: Blackstone, Brookfield, Charlton, Douglas, Dudley, East Brookfield, Grafton, Hopedale, Leicester, Mendon, Milford, Millbury, Millville, North Brookfield, Northbridge, Oxford, Southbridge, Spencer, Sturbridge, Sutton, Upton, Uxbridge, Warren, Webster

==== 2013 to 2023 ====
After the 2010 census, the shape of the district changed for the elections of 2012. The updated district covered central Massachusetts, including much of Worcester County, and was largely the successor to the old 3rd District. Most of the old 2nd district, including Springfield, was moved into the updated 1st district.

During this decade, the district contained the following municipalities:

- In Franklin County: Deerfield, Erving, Gill, Greenfield, Leverett, Montague, New Salem, Northfield, Orange, Shutesbury, Sunderland, Wendell, Warwick, and Whately
- In Hampden County: Precinct 1 in Palmer
- In Hampshire County: Amherst, Belchertown, Hadley, Hatfield, Northampton, Pelham, and Ware
- In Norfolk County: Precincts 4 and 5 in Bellingham
- In Worcester County: Athol, Auburn, Barre, Blackstone, Boylston, Douglas, Grafton, Hardwick, Holden, Hubbardston, Leicester, Leominster, Mendon, Millbury, Millville, Northborough, Northbridge, North Brookfield, Oakham, Oxford, Paxton, Petersham, Phillipston, Princeton, Royalston, Rutland, Shrewsbury, Spencer, Sterling, Sutton, Templeton, Upton, Uxbridge, Webster, West Boylston, Westborough, Precinct 1 in Winchendon, and Worcester.

== Recent election results from statewide races ==
Year	Office	Results
2008	President	Obama 61% - 37%
2008	Senate	Kerry 67% - 33%
2010	Senate (Spec.)	Brown 54% - 46%
2010	Governor	Patrick 48% - 42%
2012	President	Obama 61% - 39%
2012	Senate	Warren 52% - 48%
2014	Senate	Markey 58% - 42%
2014	Governor	Baker 50% - 44%
2016	President	Clinton 58% - 34%
2018	Senate	Warren 59% - 37%
2018	Governor	Baker 68% - 32%
2018	Secretary of the Commonwealth	Galvin 69% - 27%
2018	Attorney General	Healey 68% - 32%
2018	Treasurer and Receiver-General	Goldberg 66% - 30%
2018	Auditor	Bump 60% - 32%
2020	President	Biden 64% - 33%
2020	Senate	Markey 64% - 34%
2022	Governor	Healey 63% - 35%
2022	Secretary of the Commonwealth	Galvin 66% - 30%
2022	Attorney General	Campbell 62% - 38%
2022	Auditor	DiZoglio 53% - 39%
2024	President	Harris 60% - 37%
2024	Senate	Warren 59% - 41%

== List of members representing the district ==
Member	Party	Years	Cong ress	Electoral history	District location
District created March 4, 1789
Benjamin Goodhue (Salem)	Pro-Administration	March 4, 1789 – March 3, 1793	1st 2nd	Elected January 29, 1789, on the second ballot. Re-elected October 4, 1790. Redistricted to the 1st district.	1789–1793; Essex County
Dwight Foster (Brookfield)	Pro-Administration	General ticket: March 4, 1793 – March 3, 1795	3rd	Elected April 1, 1793, on the third ballot as part of the four-seat general ticket, representing the district at-large. Redistricted to the 4th district.	1793–1795; Berkshire County, Worcester County, and Hampshire County
Theodore Sedgwick (Great Barrington)	Pro-Administration	General ticket: March 4, 1793 – March 3, 1795	3rd	Redistricted from the 4th district and re-elected November 2, 1792, as part of the four-seat general ticket, representing the district from Berkshire County. Redistricted to the 1st district.	1793–1795; Berkshire County, Worcester County, and Hampshire County
Artemas Ward (Shrewsbury)	Pro-Administration	General ticket: March 4, 1793 – March 3, 1795	3rd	Redistricted from the 7th district and re-elected November 2, 1792, as part of the four-seat general ticket, representing the district from Worcester County. [data missing]	1793–1795; Berkshire County, Worcester County, and Hampshire County
William Lyman (Northampton)	Anti-Administration	General ticket: March 4, 1793 – March 3, 1795	3rd	Elected April 1, 1793, on the third ballot as part of the four-seat general ticket, representing the district from Hampshire County. Re-elected November 3, 1794, as the sole representative from the district. Lost re-election.	1793–1795; Berkshire County, Worcester County, and Hampshire County
William Lyman (Northampton)	Democratic-Republican	March 4, 1795 – March 3, 1797	4th	Elected April 1, 1793, on the third ballot as part of the four-seat general ticket, representing the district from Hampshire County. Re-elected November 3, 1794, as the sole representative from the district. Lost re-election.	1795–1803 "2nd Western district"
William Shepard (Westfield)	Federalist	March 4, 1797 – March 3, 1803	5th 6th 7th	Elected January 16, 1797, on the second ballot. Re-elected in 1798. Re-elected in 1800. Retired.	1795–1803 "2nd Western district"
Jacob Crowninshield (Salem)	Democratic-Republican	March 4, 1803 – April 15, 1808	8th 9th 10th	Elected in 1802. Re-elected in 1804. Re-elected in 1806. Died.	1803–1823 "Essex South district"
Vacant		April 15, 1808 – May 23, 1808	10th		1803–1823 "Essex South district"
Joseph Story (Salem)	Democratic-Republican	May 23, 1808 – March 3, 1809	10th	Elected to finish Crowninshield's term. Retired.	1803–1823 "Essex South district"
Benjamin Pickman Jr. (Salem)	Federalist	March 4, 1809 – March 3, 1811	11th	Elected in 1808. Retired.	1803–1823 "Essex South district"
William Reed (Marblehead)	Federalist	March 4, 1811 – March 3, 1815	12th 13th	Elected in 1810. Re-elected in 1812. Retired.	1803–1823 "Essex South district"
Timothy Pickering (Wendham)	Federalist	March 4, 1815 – March 3, 1817	14th	Redistricted from the 3rd district and re-elected in 1814. Lost re-election.	1803–1823 "Essex South district"
Nathaniel Silsbee (Salem)	Democratic-Republican	March 4, 1817 – March 3, 1821	15th 16th	Elected in 1816. Re-elected in 1818. Retired.	1803–1823 "Essex South district"
Gideon Barstow (Salem)	Democratic-Republican	March 4, 1821 – March 3, 1823	17th	Elected in 1821 on the third ballot. Retired.	1803–1823 "Essex South district"
Benjamin W. Crowninshield (Salem)	Democratic-Republican	March 4, 1823 – March 3, 1825	18th 19th 20th 21st	Elected in 1823 on the second ballot. Re-elected in 1824. Re-elected in 1826. Re-elected in 1828. Lost re-election.	1823–1833 "Essex South district"
Benjamin W. Crowninshield (Salem)	Anti-Jacksonian	March 4, 1825 – March 3, 1831	18th 19th 20th 21st	Elected in 1823 on the second ballot. Re-elected in 1824. Re-elected in 1826. Re-elected in 1828. Lost re-election.	1823–1833 "Essex South district"
Rufus Choate (Salem)	Anti-Jacksonian	March 4, 1831 – June 30, 1834	22nd 23rd	Elected in 1830. Re-elected in 1833. Resigned.	1823–1833 "Essex South district"
Rufus Choate (Salem)	Anti-Jacksonian	March 4, 1831 – June 30, 1834	22nd 23rd	Elected in 1830. Re-elected in 1833. Resigned.	1833–1843 [data missing]
Vacant		June 30, 1834 – December 1, 1834	23rd		1833–1843 [data missing]
Stephen C. Phillips (Salem)	Anti-Jacksonian	December 1, 1834 – March 3, 1837	23rd 24th 25th	Elected to finish Choate's term. Also elected to the full term in 1834. Re-elected in 1836. Resigned to become Mayor of Salem.	1833–1843 [data missing]
Stephen C. Phillips (Salem)	Whig	March 4, 1837 – September 28, 1838	23rd 24th 25th	Elected to finish Choate's term. Also elected to the full term in 1834. Re-elected in 1836. Resigned to become Mayor of Salem.	1833–1843 [data missing]
Vacant		September 28, 1838 – December 5, 1838	25th		1833–1843 [data missing]
Leverett Saltonstall (Salem)	Whig	December 5, 1838 – March 3, 1843	25th 26th 27th	Elected to finish Phillips's term in 1838 and seated December 5, 1838. Also elected to the full term in 1838. Re-elected in 1840. Lost re-election.	1833–1843 [data missing]
Daniel P. King (South Danvers)	Whig	March 4, 1843 – July 25, 1850	28th 29th 30th 31st	Elected in 1843 on the fourth ballot. Re-elected in 1844. Re-elected in 1846. Re-elected in 1848. Died.	1843–1853 [data missing]
Vacant		July 25, 1850 – March 3, 1851	31st		1843–1853 [data missing]
Robert Rantoul Jr. (Beverly)	Democratic	March 4, 1851 – August 7, 1852	32nd	Elected in 1850. Died.	1843–1853 [data missing]
Vacant		August 7, 1852 – December 13, 1852	32nd		1843–1853 [data missing]
Francis B. Fay (Chelsea)	Whig	December 13, 1852 – March 3, 1853	32nd	Elected to finish Rantoul's term. Retired.	1843–1853 [data missing]
Samuel L. Crocker (Taunton)	Whig	March 4, 1853 – March 3, 1855	33rd	Elected in 1852. Lost re-election.	1853–1863 [data missing]
James Buffington (Fall River)	Know Nothing	March 4, 1855 – March 3, 1857	34th 35th 36th 37th	Elected in 1854. Re-elected in 1856. Re-elected in 1858. Re-elected in 1860. Retired.	1853–1863 [data missing]
James Buffington (Fall River)	Republican	March 4, 1857 – March 3, 1863	34th 35th 36th 37th	Elected in 1854. Re-elected in 1856. Re-elected in 1858. Re-elected in 1860. Retired.	1853–1863 [data missing]
Oakes Ames (North Easton)	Republican	March 4, 1863 – March 3, 1873	38th 39th 40th 41st 42nd	Elected in 1862. Re-elected in 1864. Re-elected in 1866. Re-elected in 1868. Re-elected in 1870. Retired.	1863–1873 [data missing]
Benjamin W. Harris (East Bridgewater)	Republican	March 4, 1873 – March 3, 1883	43rd 44th 45th 46th 47th	Elected in 1872. Re-elected in 1874. Re-elected in 1876. Re-elected in 1878. Re-elected in 1880. Retired.	1873–1883 [data missing]
John D. Long (Hingham)	Republican	March 4, 1883 – March 3, 1889	48th 49th 50th	Elected in 1882. Re-elected in 1884. Re-elected in 1886. Retired.	1883–1893 [data missing]
Elijah A. Morse (Canton)	Republican	March 4, 1889 – March 3, 1893	51st 52nd	Elected in 1888. Re-elected in 1890. Redistricted to the 12th district.	1883–1893 [data missing]
Frederick H. Gillett (Springfield)	Republican	March 4, 1893 – March 3, 1925	53rd 54th 55th 56th 57th 58th 59th 60th 61st 62nd 63rd 64th 65th 66th 67th 68th	Elected in 1892. Re-elected in 1894. Re-elected in 1896. Re-elected in 1898. Re-elected in 1900. Re-elected in 1902. Re-elected in 1904. Re-elected in 1906. Re-elected in 1908. Re-elected in 1910. Re-elected in 1912. Re-elected in 1914. Re-elected in 1916. Re-elected in 1918. Re-elected in 1920. Re-elected in 1922. Retired to run for U.S. senator.	1893–1903 [data missing]
Frederick H. Gillett (Springfield)	Republican	March 4, 1893 – March 3, 1925	53rd 54th 55th 56th 57th 58th 59th 60th 61st 62nd 63rd 64th 65th 66th 67th 68th	Elected in 1892. Re-elected in 1894. Re-elected in 1896. Re-elected in 1898. Re-elected in 1900. Re-elected in 1902. Re-elected in 1904. Re-elected in 1906. Re-elected in 1908. Re-elected in 1910. Re-elected in 1912. Re-elected in 1914. Re-elected in 1916. Re-elected in 1918. Re-elected in 1920. Re-elected in 1922. Retired to run for U.S. senator.	1903–1913 [data missing]
Frederick H. Gillett (Springfield)	Republican	March 4, 1893 – March 3, 1925	53rd 54th 55th 56th 57th 58th 59th 60th 61st 62nd 63rd 64th 65th 66th 67th 68th	Elected in 1892. Re-elected in 1894. Re-elected in 1896. Re-elected in 1898. Re-elected in 1900. Re-elected in 1902. Re-elected in 1904. Re-elected in 1906. Re-elected in 1908. Re-elected in 1910. Re-elected in 1912. Re-elected in 1914. Re-elected in 1916. Re-elected in 1918. Re-elected in 1920. Re-elected in 1922. Retired to run for U.S. senator.	1913–1933 [data missing]
George B. Churchill (Amherst)	Republican	March 4, 1925 – July 1, 1925	69th	Elected in 1924. Died.	1913–1933 [data missing]
Vacant		July 1, 1925 – September 29, 1925	69th		1913–1933 [data missing]
Henry L. Bowles (Springfield)	Republican	September 29, 1925 – March 3, 1929	69th 70th	Elected to finish Churchill's term. Re-elected in 1926. Retired.	1913–1933 [data missing]
Will Kirk Kaynor (Springfield)	Republican	March 4, 1929 – December 20, 1929	71st	Elected in 1928. Died.	1913–1933 [data missing]
Vacant		December 20, 1929 – February 11, 1930	71st		1913–1933 [data missing]
William J. Granfield (Springfield)	Democratic	February 11, 1930 – January 3, 1937	71st 72nd 73rd 74th	Elected to finish Kaynor's term. Also elected to full term in 1930. Re-elected in 1932. Re-elected in 1934. Retired.	1913–1933 [data missing]
William J. Granfield (Springfield)	Democratic	February 11, 1930 – January 3, 1937	71st 72nd 73rd 74th	Elected to finish Kaynor's term. Also elected to full term in 1930. Re-elected in 1932. Re-elected in 1934. Retired.	1933–1943 [data missing]
Charles R. Clason (Springfield)	Republican	January 3, 1937 – January 3, 1949	75th 76th 77th 78th 79th 80th	Elected in 1936. Re-elected in 1938. Re-elected in 1940. Re-elected in 1942. Re-elected in 1944. Re-elected in 1946. Lost re-election.	1933–1943 [data missing]
Charles R. Clason (Springfield)	Republican	January 3, 1937 – January 3, 1949	75th 76th 77th 78th 79th 80th	Elected in 1936. Re-elected in 1938. Re-elected in 1940. Re-elected in 1942. Re-elected in 1944. Re-elected in 1946. Lost re-election.	1943–1953 [data missing]
Foster Furcolo (Longmeadow)	Democratic	January 3, 1949 – September 30, 1952	81st 82nd	Elected in 1948. Re-elected in 1950. Retired and then resigned early when appointed State Treasurer.	1943–1953 [data missing]
Vacant		September 30, 1952 – January 3, 1953	82nd		1943–1953 [data missing]
Edward Boland (Springfield)	Democratic	January 3, 1953 – January 3, 1989	83rd 84th 85th 86th 87th 88th 89th 90th 91st 92nd 93rd 94th 95th 96th 97th 98th 99th 100th	Elected in 1952. Re-elected in 1954. Re-elected in 1956. Re-elected in 1958. Re-elected in 1960. Re-elected in 1962. Re-elected in 1964. Re-elected in 1966. Re-elected in 1968. Re-elected in 1970. Re-elected in 1972. Re-elected in 1974. Re-elected in 1976. Re-elected in 1978. Re-elected in 1980. Re-elected in 1982. Re-elected in 1984. Re-elected in 1986. Retired.	1953–1963 [data missing]
Edward Boland (Springfield)	Democratic	January 3, 1953 – January 3, 1989	83rd 84th 85th 86th 87th 88th 89th 90th 91st 92nd 93rd 94th 95th 96th 97th 98th 99th 100th	Elected in 1952. Re-elected in 1954. Re-elected in 1956. Re-elected in 1958. Re-elected in 1960. Re-elected in 1962. Re-elected in 1964. Re-elected in 1966. Re-elected in 1968. Re-elected in 1970. Re-elected in 1972. Re-elected in 1974. Re-elected in 1976. Re-elected in 1978. Re-elected in 1980. Re-elected in 1982. Re-elected in 1984. Re-elected in 1986. Retired.	1963–1973 [data missing]
Edward Boland (Springfield)	Democratic	January 3, 1953 – January 3, 1989	83rd 84th 85th 86th 87th 88th 89th 90th 91st 92nd 93rd 94th 95th 96th 97th 98th 99th 100th	Elected in 1952. Re-elected in 1954. Re-elected in 1956. Re-elected in 1958. Re-elected in 1960. Re-elected in 1962. Re-elected in 1964. Re-elected in 1966. Re-elected in 1968. Re-elected in 1970. Re-elected in 1972. Re-elected in 1974. Re-elected in 1976. Re-elected in 1978. Re-elected in 1980. Re-elected in 1982. Re-elected in 1984. Re-elected in 1986. Retired.	1973–1983 [data missing]
Edward Boland (Springfield)	Democratic	January 3, 1953 – January 3, 1989	83rd 84th 85th 86th 87th 88th 89th 90th 91st 92nd 93rd 94th 95th 96th 97th 98th 99th 100th	Elected in 1952. Re-elected in 1954. Re-elected in 1956. Re-elected in 1958. Re-elected in 1960. Re-elected in 1962. Re-elected in 1964. Re-elected in 1966. Re-elected in 1968. Re-elected in 1970. Re-elected in 1972. Re-elected in 1974. Re-elected in 1976. Re-elected in 1978. Re-elected in 1980. Re-elected in 1982. Re-elected in 1984. Re-elected in 1986. Retired.	1983–1993 [data missing]
Richard Neal (Springfield)	Democratic	January 3, 1989 – January 3, 2013	101st 102nd 103rd 104th 105th 106th 107th 108th 109th 110th 111th 112th	Elected in 1988. Re-elected in 1990. Re-elected in 1992. Re-elected in 1994. Re-elected in 1996. Re-elected in 1998. Re-elected in 2000. Re-elected in 2002. Re-elected in 2004. Re-elected in 2006. Re-elected in 2008. Re-elected in 2010. Redistricted to the 1st district.	1983–1993 [data missing]
Richard Neal (Springfield)	Democratic	January 3, 1989 – January 3, 2013	101st 102nd 103rd 104th 105th 106th 107th 108th 109th 110th 111th 112th	Elected in 1988. Re-elected in 1990. Re-elected in 1992. Re-elected in 1994. Re-elected in 1996. Re-elected in 1998. Re-elected in 2000. Re-elected in 2002. Re-elected in 2004. Re-elected in 2006. Re-elected in 2008. Re-elected in 2010. Redistricted to the 1st district.	1993–2003 [data missing]
Richard Neal (Springfield)	Democratic	January 3, 1989 – January 3, 2013	101st 102nd 103rd 104th 105th 106th 107th 108th 109th 110th 111th 112th	Elected in 1988. Re-elected in 1990. Re-elected in 1992. Re-elected in 1994. Re-elected in 1996. Re-elected in 1998. Re-elected in 2000. Re-elected in 2002. Re-elected in 2004. Re-elected in 2006. Re-elected in 2008. Re-elected in 2010. Redistricted to the 1st district.	2003–2013
Jim McGovern (Worcester)	Democratic	January 3, 2013 – present	113th 114th 115th 116th 117th 118th 119th	Redistricted from the 3rd district and re-elected in 2012. Re-elected in 2014. Re-elected in 2016. Re-elected in 2018. Re-elected in 2020. Re-elected in 2022. Re-elected in 2024. Re-elected in 2026.	2013–2023
Jim McGovern (Worcester)	Democratic	January 3, 2013 – present	113th 114th 115th 116th 117th 118th 119th	Redistricted from the 3rd district and re-elected in 2012. Re-elected in 2014. Re-elected in 2016. Re-elected in 2018. Re-elected in 2020. Re-elected in 2022. Re-elected in 2024. Re-elected in 2026.	2023–present

== Recent election results ==
=== 1988 ===
2nd district election in 1988
Party	Candidate	Votes	%
Democratic	Richard Neal	156,262	80.23
Republican	Louis R. Godena	38,446	19.74
Write-in		52	0.01
Majority		117,816	60.40
Turnout			
Democratic hold			

=== 1990 ===
2nd district election in 1990
Party	Candidate	Votes	%	±%
Democratic	Richard Neal (Incumbent)	134,152	67.99	−12.24
Write-in		63,169	32.01	+32.00
Majority		70,983	35.98	−24.42
Turnout		197,321		
Democratic hold		Swing		

=== 1992 ===
2nd district election in 1992
Party	Candidate	Votes	%	±%
Democratic	Richard Neal (Incumbent)	131,215	53.09	−14.90
Republican	Anthony W. Ravosa, Jr.	76,795	31.07	+31.07
Independent	Thomas R. Sheehan	38,963	15.76	+15.76
Write-in		190	0.07	−31.94
Majority		54,420	22.02	−13.96
Turnout		247,163		
Democratic hold		Swing		

=== 1994 ===
2nd district election in 1994
Party	Candidate	Votes	%	±%
Democratic	Richard Neal (Incumbent)	117,178	58.55	+5.46
Republican	John M. Briare	72,732	36.34	+5.27
Natural Law	Kate Ross	10,167	5.08	+5.08
Write-in		46	0.02	−0.05
Majority		44,446	22.21	+0.19
Turnout		200,123		
Democratic hold		Swing		

=== 1996 ===
2nd district election in 1996
Party	Candidate	Votes	%	±%
Democratic	Richard Neal (Incumbent)	162,995	71.67	+13.12
Republican	Mark Steele	49,885	21.94	−14.40
Independent	Scott Andrichak	9,181	4.04	+4.04
Natural Law	Richard Kaynor	5,124	2.25	−2.83
Write-in		226	0.10	+0.08
Majority		113,110	49.74	+27.53
Turnout		227,411		
Democratic hold		Swing		

=== 1998 ===
2nd district election in 1998
Party	Candidate	Votes	%	±%
Democratic	Richard Neal (Incumbent)	130,550	98.95	+27.28
Write-in		1,383	1.05	+0.95
Majority		129,167	97.90	+48.16
Turnout		131,933		
Democratic hold		Swing		

=== 2000 ===
2nd district election in 2000
Party	Candidate	Votes	%	±%
Democratic	Richard Neal (Incumbent)	196,670	98.91	−0.04
Write-in		2,176	1.09	+0.04
Majority		194,494	97.81	−0.09
Turnout		253,867		
Democratic hold		Swing		

=== 2002 ===
2nd district election in 2002
Party	Candidate	Votes	%	±%
Democratic	Richard Neal (Incumbent)	153,387	99.13	+0.22
Write-in		1,341	0.87	−0.22
Majority		152,046	98.26	+0.45
Turnout		208,498		
Democratic hold		Swing		

=== 2004 ===
2nd district election in 2004
Party	Candidate	Votes	%	±%
Democratic	Richard Neal (Incumbent)	217,682	98.96	−0.17
Write-in		2,282	1.04	+0.17
Majority		227,183	97.92	−0.34
Turnout		287,871		
Democratic hold		Swing		

=== 2006 ===
2nd district election in 2006
Party	Candidate	Votes	%	±%
Democratic	Richard Neal (Incumbent)	164,939	98.65	−0.31
Write-in		2,254	1.35	+0.31
Majority		162,685	97.30	−0.62
Turnout		214,939		
Democratic hold		Swing		

=== 2008 ===
2nd district election in 2008
Party	Candidate	Votes	%	±%
Democratic	Richard Neal (Incumbent)	234,369	98.47	−0.18
Write-in		3,631	1.53	+0.18
Majority		230,738	96.95	−0.35
Turnout		306,820		
Democratic hold		Swing		

=== 2010 ===
2nd district election in 2010
Party	Candidate	Votes	%	±%
Democratic	Richard Neal (Incumbent)	122,751	57.33	−41.14
Republican	Thomas A. Wesley	91,209	42.60	+42.60
Write-in		164	0.08	−1.45
Majority		31,542	14.73	−82.12
Turnout		220,424		
Democratic hold		Swing		

=== 2012 ===
2nd district election in 2012 This election followed redistricting.
Party	Candidate	Votes	%
Democratic	Jim McGovern (Incumbent)	259,257	98.5
Write-in		4,078	1.5
Total votes		263,335	100
Turnout			
Democratic hold			

=== 2014 ===
2nd district election in 2014
Party	Candidate	Votes	%
Democratic	Jim McGovern (Incumbent)	169,640	98.20
Write-in		3,105	1.80
Total votes		172,745	100
Democratic hold			

=== 2016 ===
2nd district election in 2016
Party	Candidate	Votes	%
Democratic	Jim McGovern (Incumbent)	275,487	98.24
Write-in		4,924	1.76
Total votes		280,411	100
Democratic hold			

=== 2018 ===
2nd district election in 2018
Party	Candidate	Votes	%
Democratic	Jim McGovern (incumbent)	191,332	67.2%
Republican	Tracy Lovvorn	93,391	32.8%
Independent	Paul Grady		
Total votes		293,163	

=== 2020 ===
2nd district election in 2020
Party	Candidate	Votes	%
Democratic	Jim McGovern (incumbent)	249,854	65.3%
Republican	Tracy Lovvorn	132,220	34.6%
Write-in		378	0.1
Total votes		382,452	

=== 2022 ===
2022 Massachusetts's 2nd congressional district election
Party	Candidate	Votes	%
Democratic	Jim McGovern (incumbent)	180,639	66.2
Republican	Jeffrey Sossa-Paquette	91,956	33.7
Write-in		276	0.1
Total votes		272,871	100.0
Democratic hold			

=== 2024 ===
2024 Massachusetts's 2nd congressional district election
Party	Candidate	Votes	%
Democratic	Jim McGovern (incumbent)	251,441	68.6
Independent	Cornelius Shea	114,065	31.1
Write-in		822	0.2
Total votes		366,328	100.0
Democratic hold			

U.S. House of Representatives
Preceded by Missouri's 9th congressional district	Home district of the speaker of the House; May 19, 1919 – March 3, 1925	Succeeded by Ohio's 1st congressional district
