= Sam Sutter =

American politician

43rd Mayor of Fall River, Massachusetts
- In office December 29, 2014 – January 4, 2016
- Preceded by: William A. Flanagan
- Succeeded by: Jasiel Correia

District Attorney of Bristol County, Massachusetts
- In office January 21, 2007 – December 29, 2014
- Preceded by: Paul F. Walsh Jr.
- Succeeded by: Thomas M. Quinn III

Personal details
- Born: Clifford Samuel Sutter; August 3, 1952 (age 73) Greenwich, Connecticut
- Party: Democratic
- Occupation: Attorney

Clifford Samuel “Sam” Sutter is an American attorney and politician who served as the District Attorney of Bristol County, Massachusetts, from 2007 to 2014, and then as the 43rd Mayor of Fall River, Massachusetts from 2014 to 2015. He lost the campaign to Mayor Paul Coogan on November 7, 2023.

== Early life ==
Sutter was born August 3, 1952, in Greenwich, Connecticut, to former tennis player Cliff Sutter and Suzanne T. Sutter. Sutter attended Brown University from 1971 to 1976, graduating with a Bachelor of Arts in American Civilization. While at Brown, he played for the varsity tennis team. After spending several years traveling the world while working as a tennis instructor and professional tournament player, Sutter enrolled at Vanderbilt University Law School, graduating with a Juris Doctor in 1983.

Before running for Bristol County District Attorney in 2006, Sutter worked as both an Assistant District Attorney in the Bristol County District Attorney's office and as a private attorney specializing in criminal defense and personal injury.

== District Attorney & Congressional Run ==
Sutter ran against 16-year incumbent Bristol County District Attorney Paul Walsh in 2006, and beat him in a closely contested Democratic Primary election, with Sutter getting 33,967 votes and Walsh getting 32,186 votes. Sutter was outspent by almost 7 to 1 in the race, spending just $164,000 on his campaign, while Walsh spent $740,000. According to a column written in the New Bedford Standard-Times at the time: "He [Sutter] focused in on District Attorney Paul Walsh's lackluster record of solving major crime in New Bedford and on the lack of accountability in the district attorney's office in several areas." There was no Republican candidate in the race, so Sutter faced no opponent in the general election, and faced no opponents in either the Democratic primary or the general election in his two re-election bids for DA in '10 and '14.

In 2012 Sutter ran for Congress in the newly re-districted 9th Congressional District against incumbent Bill Keating. The 2011 redistricting process significantly changed Keating's district, cutting out Keating's hometown of Quincy and adding large sections of Bristol County where Sutter was well known but Keating was not. Despite this advantage, Sutter was soundly defeated in the Democratic Primary, receiving just 21,675 votes to Keating's 31,366 votes, which many local political experts credited to the advantages of incumbency.

Sutter was considered a potential candidate for Massachusetts Attorney General, with incumbent Martha Coakley leaving the office open when she ran for Governor in 2014.

== Contending for Mayor of Fall River ==
In 2014 a recall campaign began against Fall River Mayor William A. Flanagan, motivated by layoffs in the Fire Department and the start of a 'pay as you throw' trash collection program. After the recall campaign started Fall River City Councilor Jasiel F. Correia, II accused Flanagan of threatening him with a gun, prompting DA Sutter to appoint a special prosecutor. The recall campaign was successful and forced a two-part recall election on December 16, 2014. The ballot voters got asked two questions: first, whether or not to recall Flanagan; and second, to vote for a mayoral candidate, which could still be Flanagan. Sutter was one of eight candidates on the recall election ballot, and received about 6,000 votes, with incumbent Mayor Flanagan coming in second with about 4,400 votes defeated incumbent. Sutter's victory was the first successful recall of a mayor in the Commonwealth of Massachusetts. Sutter was sworn in as Mayor of Fall River on December 30, 2014.

Sutter faced another election in 2015, the regularly scheduled city elections. Sutter was challenged by Fall River City Councilor Jasiel Correia, who played a very public role in the effort to remove former Mayor Flanagan. According to Flanagan: “The gun incident became an international story. And locally, it was in the newspaper and on the radio, so yeah, the gun allegation gave Jasiel a platform.” On November 2, 2015, Sutter lost his bid for reelection to Correia, with Sutter receiving 7,621 votes, and Correia receiving 8,268 votes.

Correia went on to be indicted on federal corruption and fraud charges, and faced his own recall election in March 2019, which Sutter declined to run in. Correia was recalled, but got the most votes in the second round of voting so he remained Mayor. Correia faced the voters again in the regularly scheduled 2019 elections, where he lost to Paul Coogan. Sutter also declined to run in the regular 2019 election.

On December 28, 2022, Sutter announced he would run for Mayor again, challenging incumbent Mayor Paul Coogan in the 2023 mayoral election. On November 7, 2023, it was announced that Sutter had lost the election, receiving only 4,310 votes in comparison to Coogan's 6,643 votes.

== Personal life ==
Sutter is married to Dorothy Feliz Sutter, a paralegal, and has two children and one stepchild. He currently practices law in Fall River, Massachusetts.
