= Robert T. Davis =

American politician

Robert Thompson Davis
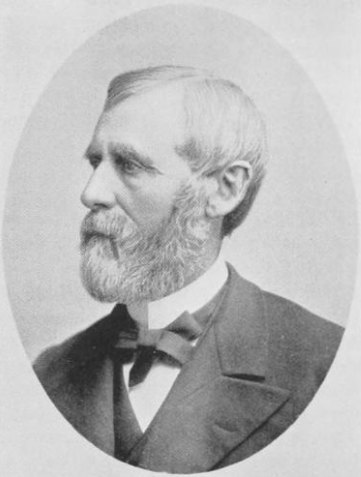

Member of the U.S. House of Representatives from Massachusetts's 1st district
- In office March 4, 1883 – March 3, 1889
- Preceded by: William W. Crapo
- Succeeded by: Charles S. Randall

8th Mayor of Fall River, Massachusetts
- In office 1873–1874
- Preceded by: Samuel M. Brown
- Succeeded by: James F. Davenport

Personal details
- Born: August 28, 1823 County Down, Ireland
- Died: October 29, 1906 (aged 83) Fall River, Massachusetts, U.S.
- Party: Republican
- Spouses: Sarah C. Wilbur (m. 1848; died 1856) Susan A. Haight (m. 1862)
- Education: Harvard Medical School
- Profession: Physician

Robert Thompson Davis (August 28, 1823 – October 29, 1906) was an American physician and politician. He was a member of the United States House of Representatives from Massachusetts, and served as Mayor of Fall River from 1873 to 1874.

== Biography ==
Robert T. Davis was born in County Down, Ireland on August 28, 1823. His family emigrated to the United States when he was three years old.

He graduated from Harvard Medical School in 1848, and practiced medicine in Waterville, Maine for three years, before moving to Fall River, Massachusetts.

He married Sarah C. Wilbur in 1848. She died in 1856, and he remarried to Susan A. Haight in 1862. They had one child.

Davis died at his home in Fall River on October 29, 1906. He is interred in Oak Grove Cemetery.

U.S. House of Representatives
Preceded by William W. Crapo	Member of the U.S. House of Representatives from Massachusetts's 1st congressional district March 4, 1883 – March 3, 1889	Succeeded by Charles S. Randall
