= Edward Dowse =

American politician (1756–1828)

Member of the U.S. House of Representatives from Massachusetts's 13th district
- In office March 4, 1819 – May 26, 1820
- Preceded by: Nathaniel Ruggles
- Succeeded by: William Eustis

Personal details
- Born: October 22, 1756 Charlestown, Province of Massachusetts Bay, British America
- Died: September 3, 1828 (aged 71) Dedham, Massachusetts, U.S.
- Party: Democratic-Republican

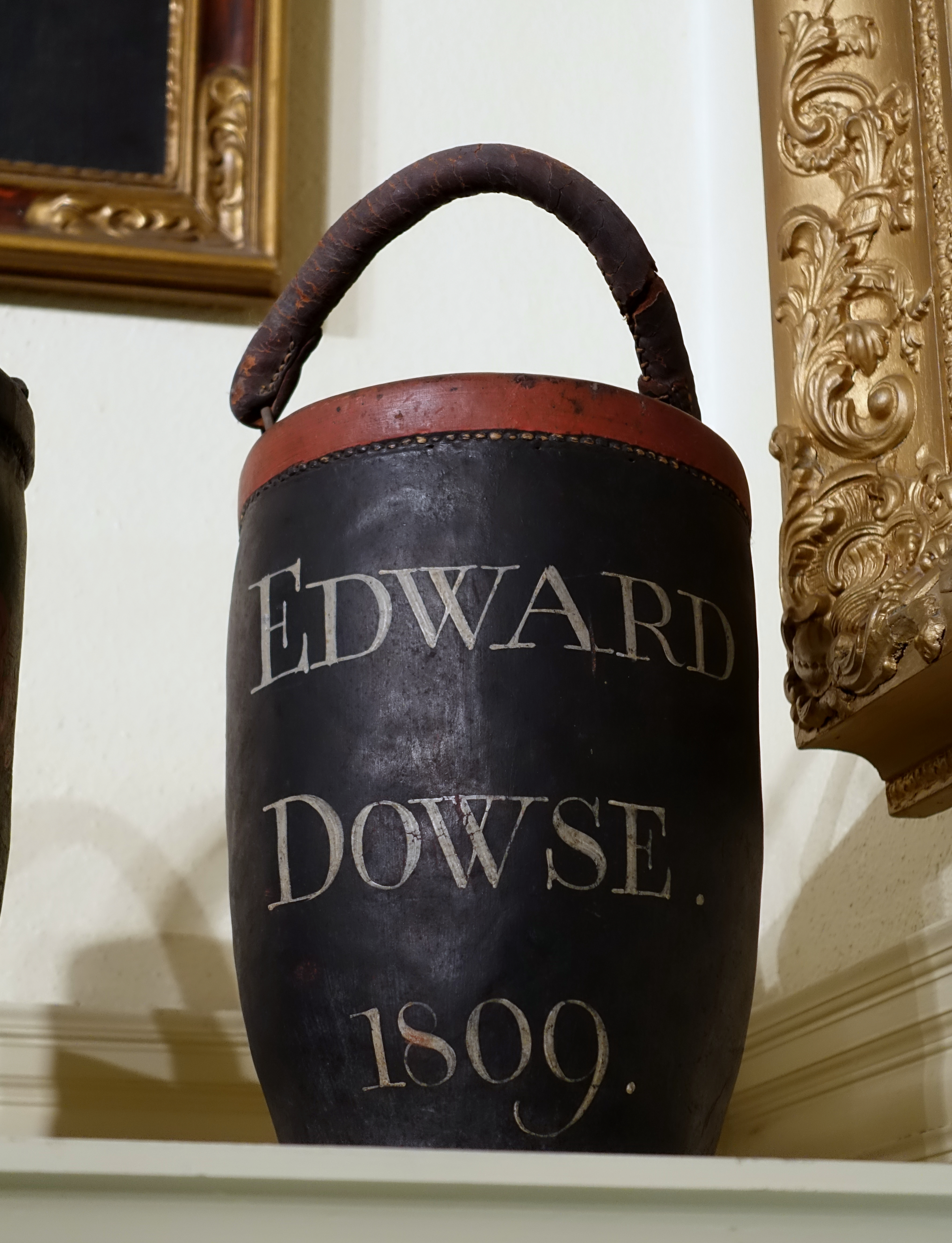
Dowse's leather fire bucket

Edward Dowse (October 22, 1756 – September 3, 1828) was a U.S. representative from Massachusetts. Born in Charlestown in the Province of Massachusetts Bay, Dowse moved to Dedham in March 1798 to escape the yellow fever epidemic in Boston. He purchased five acres of land on both sides of the Middle Post Road, today known as High Street. He lived in an already existing house at first, and then built a home on the land in 1804. (Note: The house he built was "the large, yellow house adjoining the Dedham Medical Associates Building" in 1976.) His brother-in-law was Samuel Nicholson, the first captain of USS Constitution.

Dowse once wrote to Thomas Jefferson that his predecessor in Congress, fellow Dedhamite Fisher Ames, "is a man of the most irritable and furious temper in the world." This is the only known instance of someone claiming Ames had a temper.

During his 1817 tour of the country, President James Monroe visited Dedham and stayed in Dowse's home.

After the Revolution, he became a shipmaster and engaged in the East Indian and China carrying trade. Dowse was elected as a Democratic-Republican to the Sixteenth Congress and served from March 4, 1819, until May 26, 1820, when he resigned. He also served as a representative to the Great and General Court in 1821. He died in Dedham on September 3, 1828. He is interred in the Old Village Cemetery.

== Works cited ==
- Hanson, Robert Brand (1976). Dedham, Massachusetts, 1635-1890. Dedham Historical Society.
- Knudsen, Harold M. (2025). Fisher Ames, Christian Founding Father & Federalist. Liberty Hill Publishing.
- Smith, Frank (1936). A History of Dedham, Massachusetts. Transcript Press, Incorporated.
- United States Congress. "Edward Dowse (id: D000477)". Biographical Directory of the United States Congress.

U.S. House of Representatives
Preceded by Nathaniel Ruggles	Member of the U.S. House of Representatives from Massachusetts district 13; March 4, 1819 – May 26, 1820	Succeeded by William Eustis
