= Samuel L. Crocker =

American businessman and politician (1804–1883)

Samuel Leonard Crocker
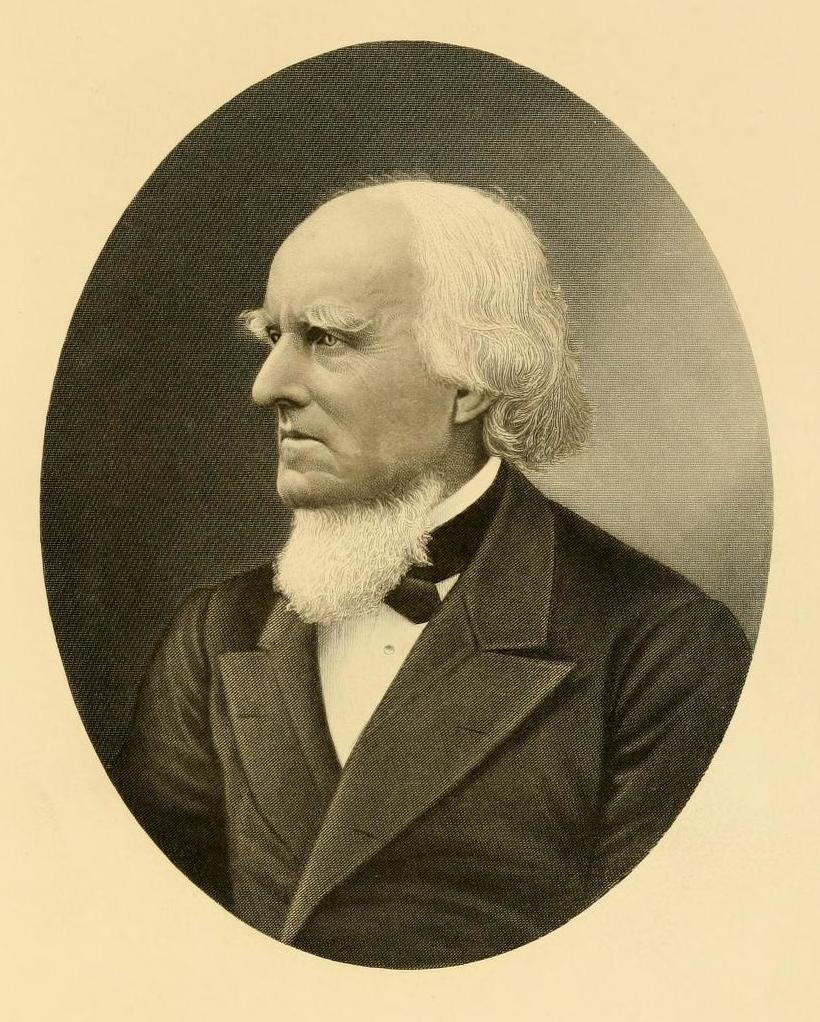

Member of the U.S. House of Representatives from Massachusetts's 2nd district
- In office March 4, 1853 – March 3, 1855
- Preceded by: Francis B. Fay
- Succeeded by: James Buffington

Personal details
- Born: March 31, 1804 Taunton, Massachusetts, U.S.
- Died: February 10, 1883 (aged 78) Boston, Massachusetts, U.S.
- Party: Whig
- Spouse(s): Hannah Weld Thomas, m. June 15, 1825, d. November 22, 1827; Caroline Thomas, m. April 13, 1830, d. January 28, 1875
- Children: Mary Caroline; Sally; Ellen Louisa; Samuel Leonard Crocker, Jr.,

Samuel Leonard Crocker (March 31, 1804 – February 10, 1883) was a businessman and U.S. Representative from Taunton, Massachusetts. Crocker graduated from Brown University, Providence, Rhode Island, in 1822. Throughout his life, he engaged in various manufacturing and civic interests in his hometown of Taunton and throughout Massachusetts.

== Personal life ==
Samuel Leonard Crocker was born in Taunton in 1804 into a prominent family. His parents were William A. Crocker and Sally (Ingell) Crocker. He was the middle of three brothers, along with older brother William Allen and younger brother George Augustus, who would later do business together as Crocker Brothers & Company. Samuel Leonard's uncle was the Hon. Samuel Crocker, who founded the firm of Crocker, Bush and Richmond in 1805. Later known as Crocker and Richmond, the firm was involved in several manufacturing businesses of Taunton during the early 19th century.

Crocker married Hannah Weld Thomas (daughter of Isaiah Thomas) in 1825, but she died two years later in 1827. In 1830, Crocker married Hannah's sister Caroline Thomas. They had three daughters and one son, Mary Caroline (who married Darius N. Couch, Sally (who married Edmund H. Bennett), Ellen Louisa and Samuel L. Crocker, Jr.

== Business career ==
In 1826, Crocker founded the Taunton Copper Manufacturing Co., along with his two brothers. Located along the Wading River in Norton, Massachusetts, the company was incorporated in 1831 with a working capital of $200,000 (~$6.91 million in 2024). The business soon prospered and expanded. The company obtained a lucrative contract to furnish the U.S. Government with $50,000 in copper coins annually. In 1845, a second location was built at Weir Village, and much of the machinery from Norton relocated to the new site.

In 1843, along with his brother George, and the Robinson brothers of Bridgewater, Crocker founded the Old Colony Iron Works in East Taunton. Established at the site of Horatio Leonard & Company, which was originally built in 1823, the Old Colony Iron Works became the largest producer of nails in New England by the mid-1870s.

Crocker was also president of the Taunton Locomotive Manufacturing Company from 1862 until his death in 1883.

He was also involved with several railroads throughout his career. In 1835, he was part of the creation of the Taunton Branch Railroad, which provided the first rail connection between Taunton and the outside world (Boston and Providence). In 1863, Crocker was among the incorporators of the Dighton and Somerset Railroad, which later became part of the Old Colony Railroad. He also served as a director of the Old Colony Railroad in his later years.

== Political and civic career ==
Crocker served as a member of the Massachusetts Governor's Council in 1849. He was elected as a Whig to the Thirty-third Congress (March 4, 1853 – March 3, 1855). Crocker was an unsuccessful candidate for reelection in 1854 to the Thirty-fourth Congress. His seat was won by James Buffington of Fall River.

In his later life, Crocker was a member of the Old Colony Historical Society, and a trustee of the Taunton Lunatic Hospital. He was also president of the local Humane Society.

Crocker died in Boston, Massachusetts on February 10, 1883. He was interred in Mount Pleasant Cemetery in Taunton, Massachusetts.

== See also ==
- Francis Baylies
- William Baylies
- William Mason
- Nahum Stetson

U.S. House of Representatives
| Preceded by Francis B. Fay | Member of the U.S. House of Representatives from Massachusetts's 2nd congressional district March 4, 1853 – March 3, 1855 | Succeeded by James Buffinton |
