= Jasiel Correia =

American politician (b. 1991)

44th Mayor of Fall River, Massachusetts
- In office January 4, 2016 – January 6, 2020
- Preceded by: Sam Sutter
- Succeeded by: Paul Coogan

Member of the Fall River City Council
- In office January 6, 2014 – January 4, 2016

Personal details
- Born: December 11, 1991 (age 34) Fall River, Massachusetts, U.S.
- Party: Democratic
- Education: Providence College

Criminal details
- Conviction(s): Wire fraud (three counts); Filing false tax returns (two counts); Extortion (four counts); Extortion conspiracy (four counts)
- Penalty: 6 years incarceration; 3 years supervised release; $311,340 restitution; $566,740 forfeiture
- Status: Released on July 11, 2026
- Previously imprisoned at: Federal Correctional Institution, Ashland

Jasiel F. Correia II (born December 11, 1991) is an American politician who served as mayor of Fall River, Massachusetts from 2016 to 2020. He was arrested twice on charges related to fraud and extortion while in office. Defeated in the November 2019 mayoral election, his term expired on January 6, 2020.

In May 2021, Correia was convicted of multiple federal charges in a trial held in Boston; on September 21, 2021, Correia was sentenced to six years in federal prison followed by three years of supervised release. On April 22, 2022, Correia reported to a Federal Correctional Institution to begin serving his six-year sentence. On July 11, 2026, Correia was released from federal custody.

== Political career ==
The Fall River logo designed during Correia's administration, typically paired with the slogan "Make it here."

In 2013, Correia ran for a seat on the Fall River City Council, placing 10th in a field of 18, where the top nine finishers are elected. Before the start of the next term, Councilor-elect Cathy Ann Viveiros accepted an appointment as City Administrator from Mayor William A. Flanagan, creating a vacancy on the City Council. Correia filled the vacancy on January 6, 2014, the regular inauguration date, as the next-highest finisher in the previous election.

In November 2015, Correia became the youngest person (at age 23) to be elected mayor of Fall River, defeating incumbent mayor Sam Sutter with almost 52% of the vote. He took office in January 2016, becoming the city's 44th mayor. In November 2017, Correia was elected to a second term as mayor against City Councilor Linda M. Pereira with 61% of the vote.

=== October 2018 arrest ===
On October 11, 2018, Correia was arrested and charged with wire fraud amounting to $231,000, and filing false tax returns. The charges against Correia accuse him of using funds from his company, SnoOwl, "as his own personal ATM" in defrauding investors. He denied the charges and said that he would not resign as mayor. In February 2019, Correia made an offer to reimburse seven investors in his company a total of $306,000; the offer was withdrawn the following month.

=== Recall and re-election ===
In early November 2018, the Fall River City Council called upon Correia to resign. On December 18, the City Council voted to give Correia five business days to resign, else face a recall election. On December 26, Correia said that he would not resign; the City Council met on January 2, 2019, and set March 12, 2019, as the date for the recall election.

Under the recall provision in Fall River's city charter, an official subject to a recall election has the option to obtain and file nomination papers to be a candidate on the ballot and potentially succeed themselves in the event of a successful recall. Nomination papers became available to candidates on January 4, 2019, and Correia obtained these papers on the same day. Correia and four other candidates submitted nomination papers with at least 300 signatures by January 22, as the first step in appearing on the ballot, with the Board of Elections certifying submitted signatures.

A candidates' debate held in late February featured Correia and four challengers, all five of whom appeared on the March 12 ballot. On the ballot, voters were first asked if Correia should be recalled; a majority voted for his recall, 7,829 to 4,911 (61%). Voters were next asked to choose from the five candidates; Correia received the most votes, 4,808 (35%). The second-place finisher had 4,567 votes (33%), and the remaining three candidates had a combined 4,171 votes (30%). Thus, while voters recalled Correia, they also re-elected Correia to succeed himself. He was therefore entitled to serve the remainder of his original term, until January 2020, with the next biennial election slated for November 2019.

On March 19, ten voters in Fall River filed a lawsuit to block certification of the election result, asserting that the ballot used on March 12 violated the city charter, and that Correia was ineligible to run for re-election. On March 22, a Superior Court judge denied the request for preliminary injunction, stating that the city charter, revised in 2017, did not expressly prohibit a recalled official from succeeding themselves.

=== September 2019 arrest ===
On September 6, 2019, Correia was arrested by the FBI for allegedly extorting cannabis vendors and a building owner for payments totaling $600,000 and items such as a "Batman" Rolex watch. The 11 new charges included extortion conspiracy, extortion aiding and abetting, and bribery. Four other people, including Correia's former chief of staff, Genoveva Andrade, were also arrested. On September 9, the president of the Fall River City Council asked Correia to resign. On September 10, the Fall River City Council voted to relieve Correia of his duties, giving him until 5 p.m. local time on September 13 to vacate his office. On September 11, Correia stated that he would continue serving as mayor, claiming that the City Council's vote was non-binding without his signature. On September 18, the City Council voted to take legal action to remove Correia from office. On October 10, a Bristol County Superior Court judge denied the attempt, ruling that the power to remove a mayor "is reserved for the citizens of Fall River" via a recall election.

=== November 2019 mayoral election ===
In the Fall River mayoral preliminary election held on September 17, 2019, Correia was one of the top two finishers in a field of three candidates, which secured him a spot on the ballot for the November general election.

In late September, Correia stated to supporters that he could not defeat Coogan in a head-to-head election, but that a write-in candidate could make the election "a multi-person race like the recall." On October 15, Correia announced he was taking a “temporary absence” as mayor, with the city council president taking over “fiscal responsibilities”. While Correia also suspended his campaign for re-election as mayor, his name still appeared on the general election ballot. On October 16, the city administrator of Fall River, Cathy Ann Viveiros, announced a write-in campaign for mayor.

In the general election held on November 5, Correia finished third, drawing fewer votes than the winner, Paul Coogan, and write-ins.

Candidates	Preliminary Election		General Election	
Candidates	Votes	%	Votes	%
Paul Coogan	8,273	62.30	10,653	79.43
Jasiel Correia	2,777	20.91	1,002	7.47
Erica Scott-Pacheco	2,171	16.35		
write-ins	59	0.44	1,756	13.09
blanks	30	n/a	635	n/a

=== Federal trial ===
Correia's original trial date of May 2020, on 24 federal charges of extortion and corruption, was postponed due to the COVID-19 pandemic. In October 2020, federal judge Douglas P. Woodlock said he expected the trial to start in January 2021. In mid-December 2020, Correia's former chief of staff, Genoveva Andrade, pleaded guilty to federal charges of extortion, bribery, and making false statements. Andrade additionally "admitted to helping Correia extort a Fall River business owner" and "admitted to kicking back half of her salary to Correia on a bi-weekly basis". Correia's federal trial began in Boston in late April 2021, and went to the jury on May 10. On May 14, 2021, Correia was convicted of 21 out of 24 counts, including demanding bribes for thousands of dollars from four area businessmen who were looking to open marijuana dispensaries and larceny of thousands of dollars from various investors in SnoOwl, a mobile app he helped to launch in 2013 while attending college. He was released on GPS monitoring pending a sentencing hearing scheduled for September 20, 2021. Court documents filed in early September indicated that prosecutors requested an 11-year prison sentence for Correia. On September 20, Judge Woodlock stated that he would dismiss six of nine wire fraud counts against Correia, due to insufficient evidence; the judge further stated that the extortion convictions would stand, and that sentencing would resume the next day.

On September 21, 2021, Correia was sentenced to six years in federal prison after being convicted of taking thousands of dollars in bribes from marijuana companies competing to open dispensaries in Fall River. The sentencing judge Woodlock called Correia's crimes "old school" corruption like those committed by Boston Mayor James Michael Curley in the late 1940s. Judge Woodlock said, "What I have before me is an absolute lack of remorse," and "City Hall was for sale."

== Incarceration ==
Correia's Federal Bureau of Prisons registration number was 01205-138. In April 2022, he began his six-year sentence for wire fraud, extortion conspiracy, and extortion in New Hampshire at the Federal Correctional Institution, Berlin. After approximately 18 months, he was moved through Metropolitan Detention Center, Brooklyn, to Federal Detention Center, Philadelphia, and in late December 2023 was at Federal Transfer Center, Oklahoma City.

In early January 2024, Correia was moved to FCI, Ashland, in Kentucky. He was released on July 11, 2026.

== Personal life ==
Correia's parents immigrated to Fall River when they were children. His father is from Cape Verde, and his mother is from the Azores. He is not related to the city's 41st mayor, Robert Correia. In April 2020, Quibi released a short documentary series about Correia titled Run This City.
