= John Simpkins =

American politician (1862–1898)

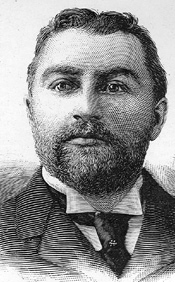

Member of the U.S. House of Representatives from Massachusetts's 13th district
- In office March 4, 1895 – March 27, 1898
- Preceded by: Charles S. Randall
- Succeeded by: William S. Greene

Member of the Massachusetts Senate
- In office 1890-1891

Personal details
- Born: June 27, 1862 New Bedford, Massachusetts, U.S.
- Died: March 27, 1898 (aged 35) Washington, D.C., U.S.
- Party: Republican
- Education: Harvard University

John Simpkins (June 27, 1862 – March 27, 1898) was a U.S. representative from Massachusetts.

Born in New Bedford, Massachusetts, Simpkins attended the public schools of Yarmouth and St. Mark's School, Southboro, Massachusetts. He graduated from Harvard University in 1885. From 1890 through 1891 he served as a member of the Massachusetts State Senate. He served as president of the Republican Club of Massachusetts in 1892 and 1893. He served as member of the Republican State committee 1892–1894.

Simpkins was elected as a Republican to the Fifty-fourth and Fifty-fifth Congresses and served from March 4, 1895, until his death in Washington, D.C., on March 27, 1898. He was interred in Woodside Cemetery, Yarmouth, Massachusetts.

He amassed a large collection of books that was donated to the public school he had attended (at 134 Old Main Street in South Yarmouth, Massachusetts) upon his death in 1898. The school was named for him. The school opened in 1930 for grades 1–12. In 1958, after the new Dennis-Yarmouth Regional High School was built, it first became a middle school and then an elementary school. In 2006 it closed.

== See also ==
- List of members of the United States Congress who died in office (1790–1899)

U.S. House of Representatives
Preceded by Charles S. Randall	Member of the U.S. House of Representatives from Massachusetts's 13th congressional district March 4, 1895 - March 27, 1898	Succeeded by William S. Greene
