= Robert M. Leach =

American politician

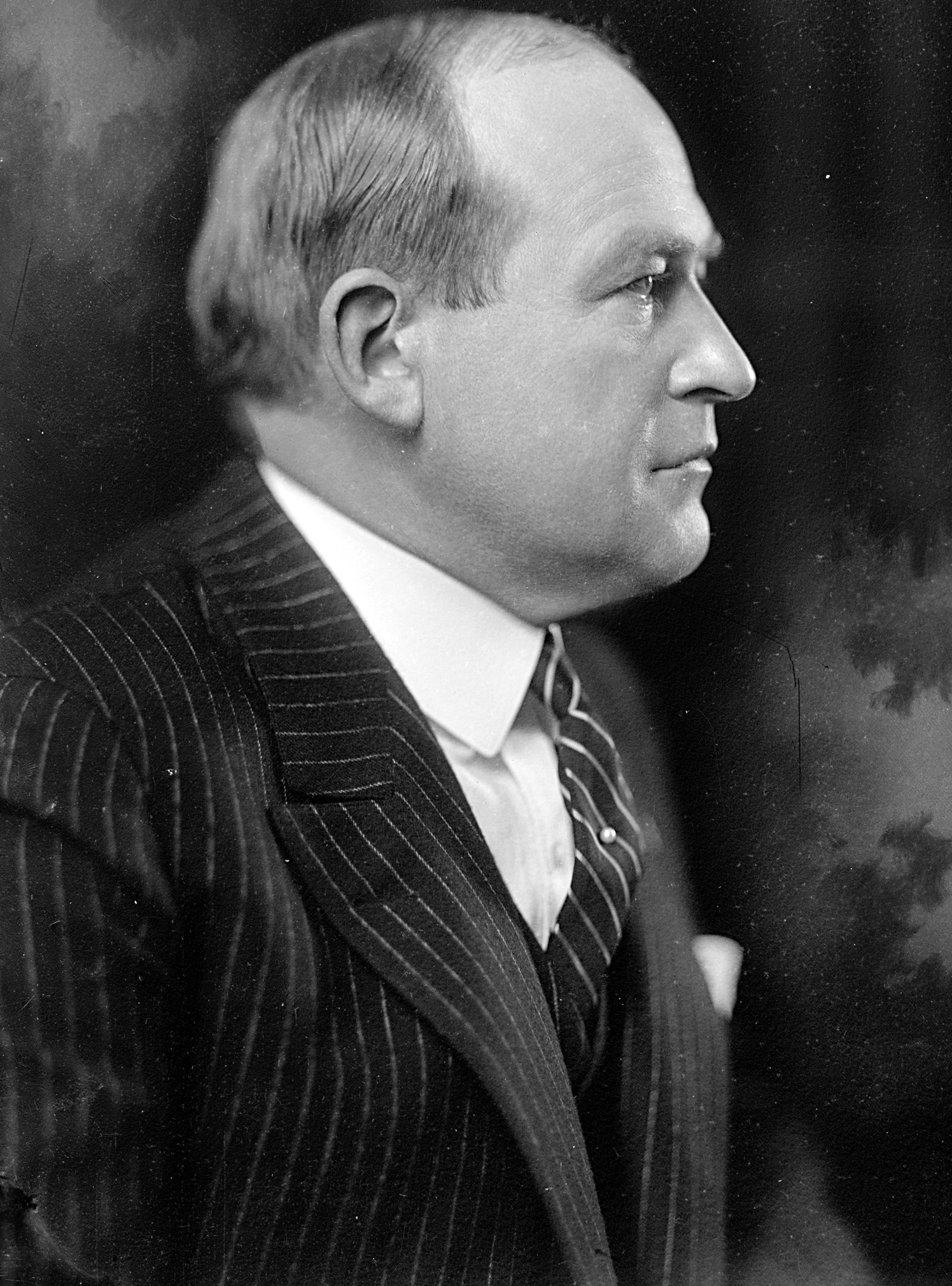

Member of the U.S. House of Representatives from Massachusetts's 15th district
- In office November 4, 1924 – March 3, 1925
- Preceded by: William S. Greene
- Succeeded by: Joseph William Martin Jr.

Personal details
- Born: April 2, 1879 Franklin, New Hampshire, U.S.
- Died: February 18, 1952 (aged 72) Eustis, Florida, U.S.
- Party: Republican
- Education: Dartmouth College
- Occupation: Businessman

Robert Milton Leach (April 2, 1879 – February 18, 1952) was a United States representative from Massachusetts. He was born in Franklin, New Hampshire, on April 2, 1879. He attended the public schools, Phillips Academy and Dartmouth College. He moved to Taunton, Massachusetts, in 1900 and engaged in the chain-store furniture business in New England.

He was commissioned as captain in the Ordnance Division of the United States Army during World War I. He was elected as a Republican to the Sixty-eighth Congress to fill the vacancy caused by the death of William S. Greene and served from November 4, 1924, to March 3, 1925. He was not a candidate for renomination. He resumed his former business activities and died in Eustis, Florida, on February 18, 1952. His interment was in Franklin Cemetery in Franklin, N.H.

U.S. House of Representatives
Preceded by William S. Greene	Member of the U.S. House of Representatives from Massachusetts's 15th congressional district November 4, 1924 – March 3, 1925	Succeeded by Joseph W. Martin
