= Massachusetts's 13th congressional district =

Former U.S. House district from 1795 to 1963

- Obsolete district
- Created: 1795; 1890
- Eliminated: 1830; 1960
- Years active: 1795–1833; 1893–1963

Massachusetts's current districts, since 2013

Massachusetts's 13th congressional district is an obsolete district that was first active 1793–1803 in the District of Maine, then active 1803–1833 and 1893–1963 in Eastern Massachusetts. It was most recently eliminated in 1963 after the 1960 U.S. census. Its last congressman was James A. Burke, who was redistricted into the 11th district.

== List of members representing the district ==
Representative	Party	Years	Cong ress	Electoral history	District location
District created March 4, 1795
Peleg Wadsworth (Portland)	Federalist	March 4, 1795 – March 3, 1803	4th 5th 6th 7th	Redistricted from the 4th district and re-elected in 1795 on the second ballot. Re-elected in 1796. Re-elected in 1798. Re-elected in 1800. Redistricted to the 15th district.	1795 – 1803 "2nd eastern district," District of Maine
Ebenezer Seaver (Roxbury)	Democratic-Republican	March 4, 1803 – March 3, 1813	8th 9th 10th 11th 12th	Elected in 1802. Re-elected in 1804. Re-elected in 1806. Re-elected in 1808. Re-elected in 1810. Lost re-election.	1803 – 1823 "Norfolk district"
Nathaniel Ruggles (Boston)	Federalist	March 4, 1813 – March 3, 1819	13th 14th 15th	Elected in 1812. Re-elected in 1814. Re-elected in 1816. Lost re-election.	1803 – 1823 "Norfolk district"
Edward Dowse (Dedham)	Democratic-Republican	March 4, 1819 – May 26, 1820	16th	Elected in 1818. Resigned.	1803 – 1823 "Norfolk district"
Vacant		May 26, 1820 – August 21, 1820	16th		1803 – 1823 "Norfolk district"
William Eustis (Boston)	Democratic-Republican	August 21, 1820 – March 3, 1823	16th 17th	Elected May 26, 1820 to finish Dowse's term. Re-elected later in 1820. Seated November 13, 1820. Redistricted to the 10th district and re-elected in 1822 but declined the seat when elected Governor of Massachusetts.	1803 – 1823 "Norfolk district"
John Reed Jr. (Yarmouth)	Adams-Clay Federalist	March 4, 1823 – March 3, 1825	18th 19th 20th 21st 22nd	Redistricted from the 9th district and re-elected in 1822. Re-elected in 1824. Re-elected in 1826. Re-elected in 1828. Redistricted to the 11th district.	1823 – 1833 "Barnstable district"
John Reed Jr. (Yarmouth)	Anti-Jacksonian	March 4, 1825 – March 3, 1833	18th 19th 20th 21st 22nd	Redistricted from the 9th district and re-elected in 1822. Re-elected in 1824. Re-elected in 1826. Re-elected in 1828. Redistricted to the 11th district.	1823 – 1833 "Barnstable district"
District eliminated March 3, 1833
District re-created March 4, 1893
Charles S. Randall (New Bedford)	Republican	March 4, 1893 – March 3, 1895	53rd	Redistricted from the 1st district and re-elected in 1892. Lost renomination.	1893–1903 [data missing]
John Simpkins (Yarmouth)	Republican	March 4, 1895 – March 27, 1898	54th 55th	Elected in 1894. Re-elected in 1896. Died.	1893–1903 [data missing]
Vacant		March 27, 1898 – May 31, 1898	55th		1893–1903 [data missing]
William S. Greene (Fall River)	Republican	May 31, 1898 – March 3, 1913	55th 56th 57th 58th 59th 60th 61st 62nd	Elected to finish Simpkins's term. Re-elected in 1898. Re-elected in 1900. Re-elected in 1902. Re-elected in 1904. Re-elected in 1906. Re-elected in 1908. Re-elected in 1910. Redistricted to the 15th district.	1893–1903 [data missing]
William S. Greene (Fall River)	Republican	May 31, 1898 – March 3, 1913	55th 56th 57th 58th 59th 60th 61st 62nd	Elected to finish Simpkins's term. Re-elected in 1898. Re-elected in 1900. Re-elected in 1902. Re-elected in 1904. Re-elected in 1906. Re-elected in 1908. Re-elected in 1910. Redistricted to the 15th district.	1903–1913 [data missing]
John W. Weeks (Newton)	Republican	March 4, 1913 – March 4, 1913	63rd	Redistricted from the 12th district and re-elected in 1912, but resigned on the same day to become U.S. Senator.	1913 – 1933; Suffolk County: Boston (Ward 25). "Norfolk County: Towns of Bellingham, Brookline, Dover, Franklin, Medfield, Medway, Millis, Needham, Norfolk, Plainville, Walpole, Wellesley, and Wrentham. Middlesex County: Cities of Marlboro, Newton, and Waltham; towns of Ashland, Framingham, Holliston, Natick, Sherborn, Sudbury, Wayland and Weston. Worcester County: Town of Southboro."
Vacant		March 4, 1913 – April 14, 1913	63rd		1913 – 1933; Suffolk County: Boston (Ward 25). "Norfolk County: Towns of Bellingham, Brookline, Dover, Franklin, Medfield, Medway, Millis, Needham, Norfolk, Plainville, Walpole, Wellesley, and Wrentham. Middlesex County: Cities of Marlboro, Newton, and Waltham; towns of Ashland, Framingham, Holliston, Natick, Sherborn, Sudbury, Wayland and Weston. Worcester County: Town of Southboro."
John J. Mitchell (Marlborough)	Democratic	April 15, 1913 – March 3, 1915	63rd	Elected to finish Weeks's term. Lost re-election.	1913 – 1933; Suffolk County: Boston (Ward 25). "Norfolk County: Towns of Bellingham, Brookline, Dover, Franklin, Medfield, Medway, Millis, Needham, Norfolk, Plainville, Walpole, Wellesley, and Wrentham. Middlesex County: Cities of Marlboro, Newton, and Waltham; towns of Ashland, Framingham, Holliston, Natick, Sherborn, Sudbury, Wayland and Weston. Worcester County: Town of Southboro."
William Henry Carter (Needham Heights)	Republican	March 4, 1915 – March 3, 1919	64th 65th	Elected in 1914. Re-elected in 1916. Retired.	1913 – 1933; Suffolk County: Boston (Ward 25). "Norfolk County: Towns of Bellingham, Brookline, Dover, Franklin, Medfield, Medway, Millis, Needham, Norfolk, Plainville, Walpole, Wellesley, and Wrentham. Middlesex County: Cities of Marlboro, Newton, and Waltham; towns of Ashland, Framingham, Holliston, Natick, Sherborn, Sudbury, Wayland and Weston. Worcester County: Town of Southboro."
Robert Luce (Waltham)	Republican	March 4, 1919 – March 3, 1933	66th 67th 68th 69th 70th 71st 72nd	Elected in 1918. Re-elected in 1920. Re-elected in 1922. Re-elected in 1924. Re-elected in 1926. Re-elected in 1928. Re-elected in 1930. Redistricted to the 9th district.	1913 – 1933; Suffolk County: Boston (Ward 25). "Norfolk County: Towns of Bellingham, Brookline, Dover, Franklin, Medfield, Medway, Millis, Needham, Norfolk, Plainville, Walpole, Wellesley, and Wrentham. Middlesex County: Cities of Marlboro, Newton, and Waltham; towns of Ashland, Framingham, Holliston, Natick, Sherborn, Sudbury, Wayland and Weston. Worcester County: Town of Southboro."
Richard B. Wigglesworth (Milton)	Republican	March 4, 1933 – November 13, 1958	73rd 74th 75th 76th 77th 78th 79th 80th 81st 82nd 83rd 84th 85th	Redistricted from the 14th district and re-elected in 1932. Re-elected in 1934. Re-elected in 1936. Re-elected in 1938. Re-elected in 1940. Re-elected in 1942. Re-elected in 1944. Re-elected in 1946. Re-elected in 1948. Re-elected in 1950. Re-elected in 1952. Re-elected in 1954. Re-elected in 1956. Resigned to become U.S. Ambassador to Canada.	1933 – 1943 [data missing]
Richard B. Wigglesworth (Milton)	Republican	March 4, 1933 – November 13, 1958	73rd 74th 75th 76th 77th 78th 79th 80th 81st 82nd 83rd 84th 85th	Redistricted from the 14th district and re-elected in 1932. Re-elected in 1934. Re-elected in 1936. Re-elected in 1938. Re-elected in 1940. Re-elected in 1942. Re-elected in 1944. Re-elected in 1946. Re-elected in 1948. Re-elected in 1950. Re-elected in 1952. Re-elected in 1954. Re-elected in 1956. Resigned to become U.S. Ambassador to Canada.	1943 – 1953 [data missing]
Richard B. Wigglesworth (Milton)	Republican	March 4, 1933 – November 13, 1958	73rd 74th 75th 76th 77th 78th 79th 80th 81st 82nd 83rd 84th 85th	Redistricted from the 14th district and re-elected in 1932. Re-elected in 1934. Re-elected in 1936. Re-elected in 1938. Re-elected in 1940. Re-elected in 1942. Re-elected in 1944. Re-elected in 1946. Re-elected in 1948. Re-elected in 1950. Re-elected in 1952. Re-elected in 1954. Re-elected in 1956. Resigned to become U.S. Ambassador to Canada.	1953 – 1963 [data missing]
Vacant		November 14, 1958 – January 3, 1959	85th		1953 – 1963 [data missing]
James A. Burke (Milton)	Democratic	January 3, 1959 – January 3, 1963	86th 87th	Elected in 1958. Re-elected in 1960. Redistricted to the 11th district.	1953 – 1963 [data missing]
District eliminated January 3, 1963
