= Milton Reed =

American politician

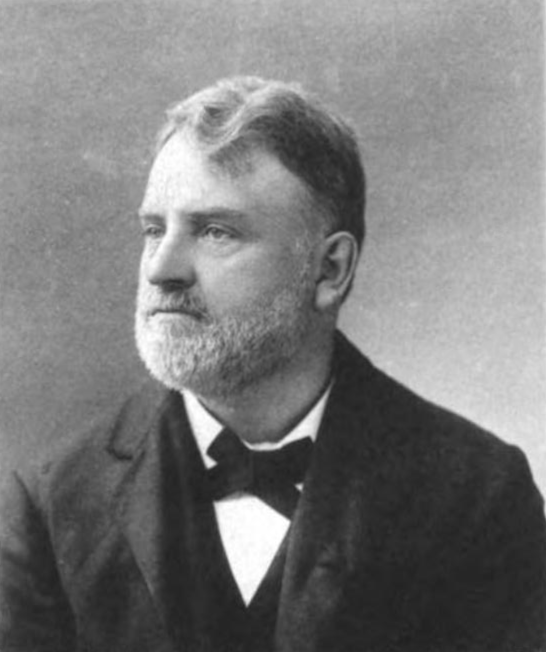

Mayor of Fall River, Massachusetts
- In office 1884–1884
- Preceded by: Henry K. Braley
- Succeeded by: John W. Cummings

Member of the Massachusetts State Senate for the Second Bristol District
- In office 1881–1881

Personal details
- Born: October 1, 1848 Haverhill, Massachusetts
- Died: September 18, 1932 (aged 83) Fall River, Massachusetts
- Education: Harvard University, 1868; Harvard Law School
- Profession: Attorney, journalist, newspaper publisher

Milton Reed (October 1, 1848 – September 18, 1932) was an American journalist, attorney and politician who served as Mayor of Fall River, Massachusetts.

== Biography ==
Milton Reed was born in Haverhill, Massachusetts on October 1, 1848. He graduated from Harvard University in 1868, and worked as a journalist, editing the Fall River Daily Evening News. He then studied law at Harvard Law School, and in the office of Edmund H. Bennett.

In 1881, he served as a member of the Massachusetts State Senate for the Second Bristol District. He was mayor of Fall River in 1884.

He died in Fall River on September 18, 1932.

== See also ==
- 102nd Massachusetts General Court (1881)

Political offices
| Preceded by Henry K. Braley | Mayor of Fall River, Massachusetts; 1884– 1884 | Succeeded by John W. Cummings |
