= Charles S. Randall =

American politician

Charles Sturtevant Randall
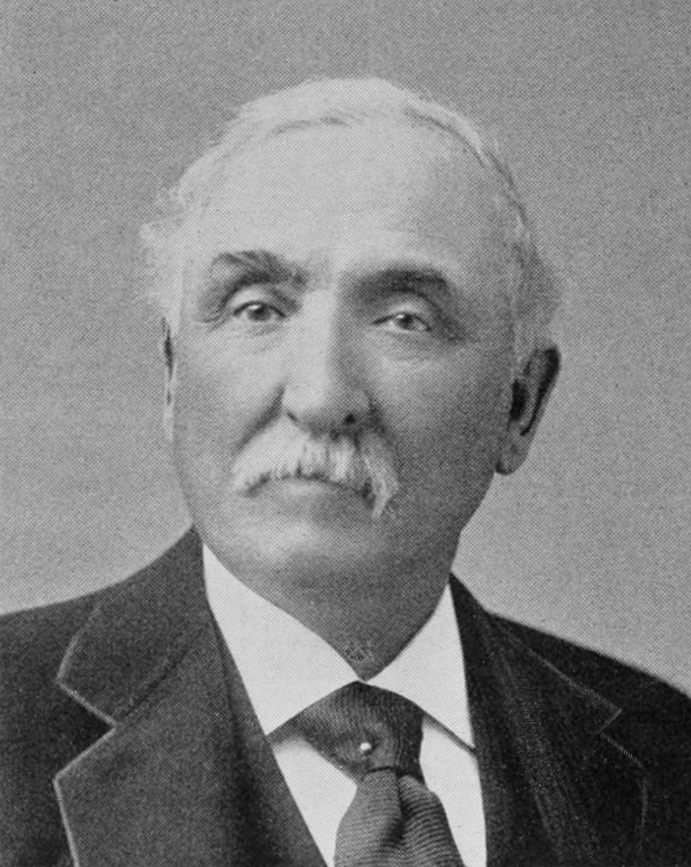

Member of the U.S. House of Representatives from Massachusetts
- In office March 4, 1889 – March 3, 1895
- Preceded by: Robert T. Davis
- Succeeded by: John Simpkins
- Constituency: 1st district (1889–93); 13th district (1893–95)

Member of the Massachusetts State Senate
- In office 1883-1884

Personal details
- Born: February 20, 1824 New Bedford, Massachusetts, US
- Died: August 17, 1904 (aged 80) New Bedford, Massachusetts, US
- Party: Republican
- Spouse(s): Sarah Spooner, m. 1851.
- Children: Harriet; Sarah

Charles Sturtevant Randall (February 20, 1824 – August 17, 1904) was a member of the United States House of Representatives from Massachusetts.

Born in New Bedford, Massachusetts, on February 20, 1824; died in New Bedford, Massachusetts, August 17, 1904. Randall is interred in the Rural Cemetery.

U.S. House of Representatives
Preceded by Robert T. Davis	Member of the U.S. House of Representatives from Massachusetts's 1st congressional district March 4, 1889 – March 3, 1893	Succeeded by Ashley B. Wright
Preceded by District created	Member of the U.S. House of Representatives from Massachusetts's 13th congressional district March 4, 1893 – March 3, 1895	Succeeded by John Simpkins
