= William S. Greene =

American politician

William Stedman Greene
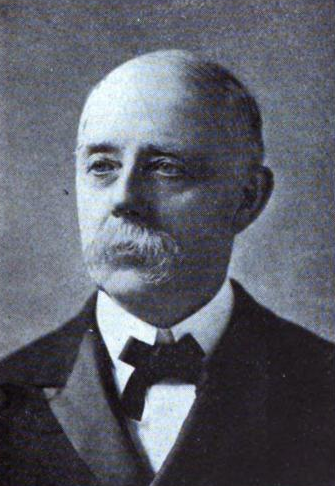

Member of the U.S. House of Representatives from Massachusetts
- In office May 31, 1898 – September 22, 1924
- Preceded by: John Simpkins
- Succeeded by: Robert M. Leach
- Constituency: 13th district (1898–1913); 15th district (1913–1924)

11th, 15th, & 19th Mayor of Fall River, Massachusetts
- In office 1880 – March 28, 1881
- Preceded by: Crawford E. Lindsey
- Succeeded by: Robert Henry
- In office 1886–1886
- Preceded by: John W. Cummings
- Succeeded by: John W. Cummings
- In office 1895–1897
- Preceded by: John W. Coughlin
- Succeeded by: Amos M. Jackson

City of Fall River Common Council

City of Fall River President of the Common Council
- In office 1877–1879

Personal details
- Born: April 28, 1841 Tremont, Illinois, U.S.
- Died: September 22, 1924 (aged 83) Fall River, Massachusetts, U.S.
- Party: Republican
- Spouse: Mary E. White (m. 1865)
- Occupation: Real estate Insurance

William Stedman Greene (April 28, 1841 – September 22, 1924) was a United States representative from Massachusetts.

== Biography ==
William S. Greene was born in Tremont, Illinois on April 28, 1841. He moved with his parents to Fall River, Massachusetts in 1844.

He attended the public schools and engaged in the real estate and insurance business. He married Mary E. White on March 8, 1865.

He was a member of the common council, and served as president of that body 1877-1879. He served as Mayor of Fall River in 1880, and was reelected the following year, but resigned soon after assuming the position. Greene was appointed postmaster of Fall River on March 22, 1881, and served until March 30, 1885. He again served as Mayor 1886 and 1895-1897. He served as general superintendent of State prisons 1888-1898, was reappointed postmaster of Fall River and served from March 9, to July 1, 1898, when he resigned to run for Congress.

He was elected as a Republican to the Fifty-fifth Congress to fill the vacancy caused by the death of John Simpkins. He was reelected to the Fifty-sixth and to the twelve succeeding Congresses and served from May 31, 1898, until his death in Fall River on September 22, 1924.

He served as chairman of the Committee on Expenditures in the Department of the Navy for the Fifty-eighth Congress, and the Committee on Merchant Marine and Fisheries (Sixtieth, Sixty-first, and Sixty-sixth through Sixty-eighth Congresses).

His interment was in Oak Grove Cemetery. The William S. Greene Elementary School in Fall River is named in his honor.

== See also ==
- List of members of the United States Congress who died in office (1900–1949)

U.S. House of Representatives
Preceded by John Simpkins	Member of the U.S. House of Representatives from Massachusetts's 13th congressional district May 31, 1898 - March 3, 1913	Succeeded by John W. Weeks
Preceded by Ezekiel Whitman	Member of the U.S. House of Representatives from Massachusetts's 15th congressional district March 4, 1913 - September 22, 1924	Succeeded by Robert M. Leach
