= Rochester Academy Charter School =

Charter school in Rochester, New York, United States

Coordinates: 43.133319°N 77.636911°W

Rochester Academy Charter School (RACS) is a charter school in Rochester, New York serving students from Kindergarten to 12th grade. It became Rochester's first charter high school when it was approved by the New York State Board of Regents in 2007.
