= Robert Correia =

American politician (1939–2021)

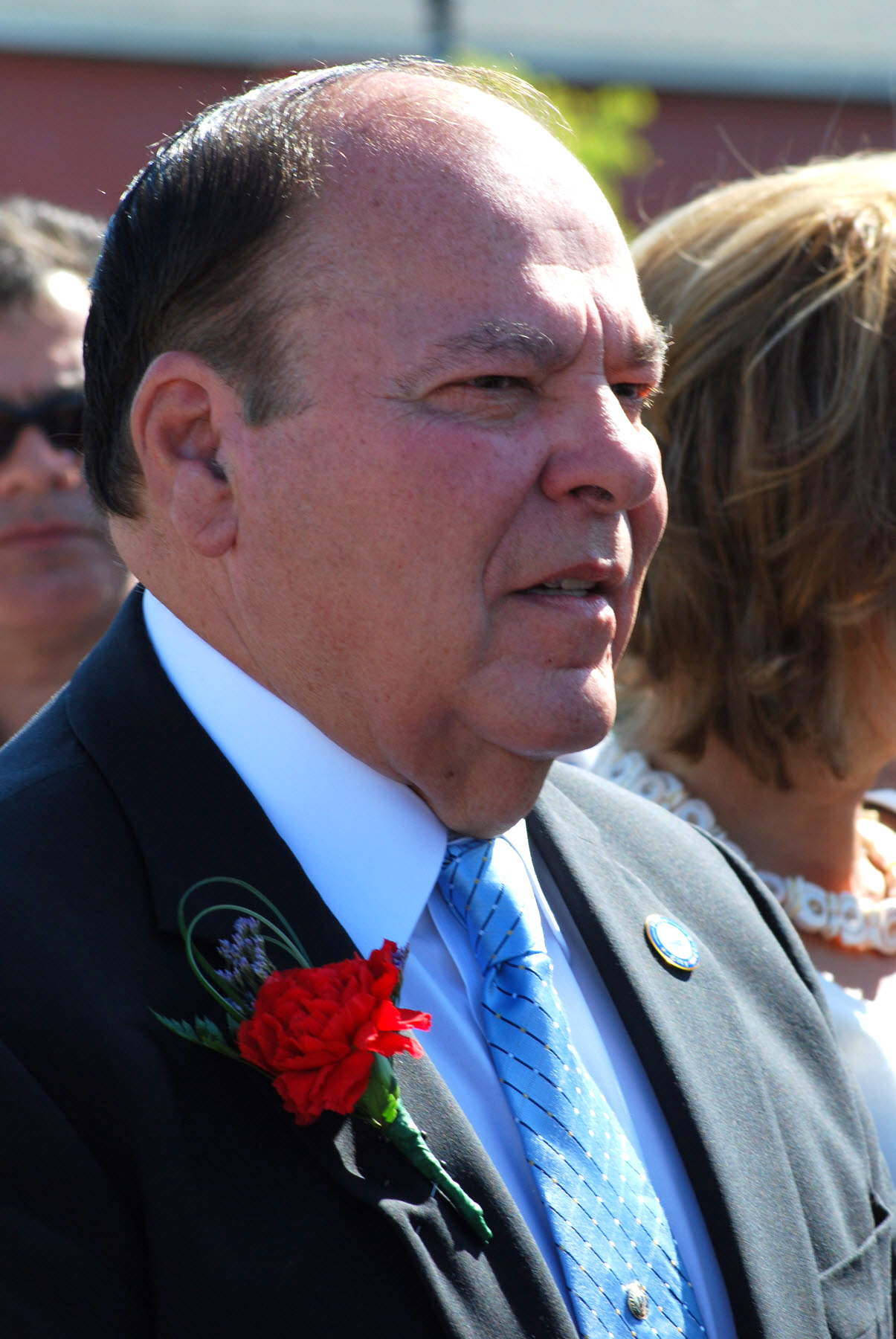
- Correia in 2008

41st Mayor of Fall River, Massachusetts
- In office January 7, 2008 – January 4, 2010
- Preceded by: William F. Whitty (Acting)
- Succeeded by: William A. Flanagan

Member of the Massachusetts House of Representatives
- In office January 5, 1977 – January 7, 2008
- Preceded by: Matthew J. Kuss
- Succeeded by: Kevin Aguiar
- Constituency: 12th Bristol (1977–1979); 7th Bristol (1979–2008)

Personal details
- Born: January 3, 1939 Fall River, Massachusetts, U.S.
- Died: July 2, 2021 (aged 82)
- Party: Democratic
- Education: Southeastern Massachusetts University; Bridgewater State University
- Occupation: Politician, teacher

Robert Correia (January 3, 1939 – July 2, 2021) was an American politician who represented the 12th and 7th Bristol Districts in the Massachusetts House of Representatives from 1977 to 2008 and served as the 41st Mayor of Fall River, Massachusetts from 2008 to 2010. He ran for re-election as Mayor in 2009 but finished third in the mayoral preliminary behind City Councilor Cathy Ann Viveiros and Attorney William Flanagan.

== Early life and education ==
Correia was born in Fall River, Massachusetts. He graduated from B.M.C. Durfee High School, the University of Massachusetts Dartmouth (bachelor's degree) and Bridgewater State University with a master's degree in Education. He is not related to Fall River's 44th mayor, Jasiel Correia.

== Political career ==
Correia's involvement in politics began with his membership on Fall River's Democratic City Committee, and his first attempts at elected office were unsuccessful campaigns to unseat State Rep. Matthew J. Kuss, Jr. of the 12th Bristol District in 1974 and 1976. Correia would be defeated by Kuss four times in these two years, as each of his losses in the Democratic primary would be followed by unsuccessful write-in and independent campaigns in the general election.

=== State representative ===
On January 21, 1977, Representative Kuss died in office, and a special election was held for the rest of Kuss's term on June 7, 1977, which Correia won without opposition. While this first election was to the 12th Bristol District, redistricting would see Correia running for the 7th Bristol District in 1978 to succeed Henry S. Gillet, Jr, which is the district he served for the rest of his time as a State Representative.

=== Mayor of Fall River ===
Robert Correia first ran for Mayor of Fall River in September, 1991 preliminary against incumbent John R. Mitchell (D), who had only just won a special election to that office four months before. After placing a distant second in the preliminary, Correia dropped out of the race, calling his run "premature" and leaving Mayor Mitchell token opposition on the ballot in the November general election.

In 2007, sixteen years after his first campaign for Mayor of Fall River, Correia again ran for the office against seven other candidates; including his fellow State Representative, David B. Sullivan. Correia led Sullivan in the September preliminary, and on November 6, 2007, Correia was elected Mayor with 54% of the vote. Taking office on January 7, 2008; Correia had demanded the resignation of all city department heads the very next day, but rehiring all but one, signifying the beginning of a tumultuous relationship with city employees which influenced the rest of his term.

In 2009, Correia ran for a second term, however he was eliminated from contention after placing third in a field of six in the September 15th preliminary election, losing to Attorney William A. Flanagan by just 271 votes. This made him only the second Mayor in Fall River's history to be eliminated in the preliminary during a reelection campaign; the first being Mayor Nicholas W. Mitchell who faced a similar loss in 1971. Flanagan would go on to win the November runoff election with more than 60% of the vote and succeeded Correia as Mayor in January, 2010.

Correia died on July 2, 2021, at the age of 82.
