= List of mayors of Fall River, Massachusetts =

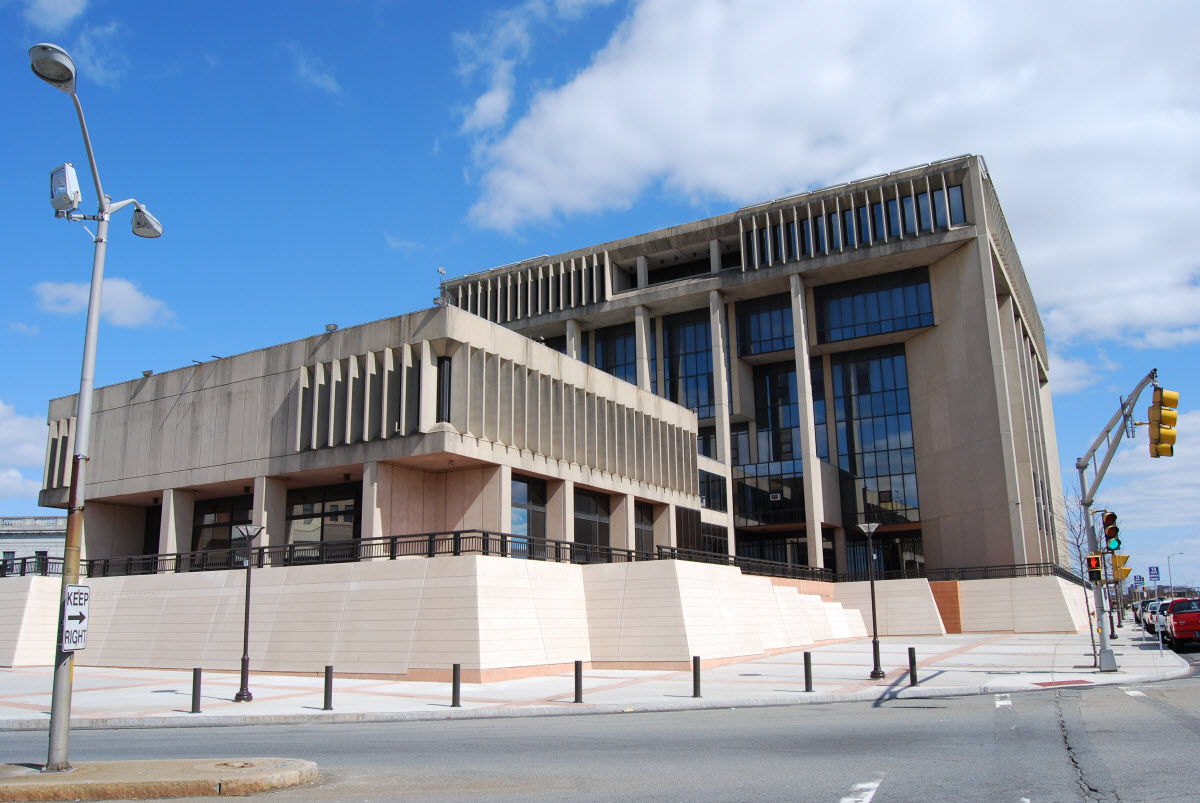
Fall River Government Center

This is a list of mayors of the City of Fall River, Massachusetts, from 1854 to present. Fall River was led by a three-member Board of Selectmen from 1803 until its re-incorporation as a city in 1854.

From 1854 until 1902, mayoral elections were held every year and mayors served one-year terms. In 1902, the mayoral term was increased to two years, which lasted until the city charter was changed in 1965. That year, the mayoral term was again increased, this time to a four-year term. This change would be overturned by voters in 1973 and a two-year term was reinstated.

The mayor's office is located at Fall River Government Center.

== Mayoral chronology ==
As of March 2019, there have been 44 mayors and three acting mayors. Non-consecutive terms by the same person are counted separately (for example, John W. Cummings was both the 14th and 16th mayor). Number of mayors, ranked by party affiliation:

Party	Number		Most recent officeholder
Party	Mayor	Acting	Most recent officeholder
Democratic	23	3	Paul E. Coogan (2020–present)
Republican	19	1	Alexander C. Murray (1935–1945)
Independent	1	—	Daniel F. Sullivan (1931–1932)
Whig	1	—	Nathaniel B. Borden (1857–1858)
American	1	—	James Buffington (1854–1855)

List of Mayors

#	Mayor	Picture	Term	Notes
1st	James Buffington		May 15, 1854–1855	Previously a selectman from 1851 until establishment of the city.
2nd	Edward P. Buffinton		1856–1857	
3rd	Nathaniel B. Borden		1857–1858	Previously a selectman from 1840 to 1841.
4th	Josiah C. Blaisdell		1858–1860	
5th	Edward P. Buffinton		1860–1867	
6th	George O. Fairbanks		1867–1869	Previously a selectman from 1852 until 1854.
7th	Samuel M. Brown		1869–1873	
8th	Robert T. Davis		1873–1874	
9th	James F. Davenport		1874–1877	
10th	Crawford E. Lindsey		1878–1879	
11th	William S. Greene		1880 – March 28, 1881	Resigned.
Acting	Robert Henry		1881–1881	Elected by the city council.
12th	Henry K. Braley		1882–1883	
13th	Milton Reed		1884–1884	
14th	John W. Cummings		1885–1885	
15th	William S. Greene		1886–1886	
16th	John W. Cummings		1887–1888	
17th	James Frederick Jackson		1889–1890	
18th	John W. Coughlin		1891–1894	
19th	William S. Greene		1895–1897	
20th	Amos M. Jackson		1898–1899	
21st	John H. Abbott		1900–1901	
22nd	George Grime		1902–1904	Sitting in 1902.
23rd	John T. Coughlin		1905–1910	
24th	Thomas F. Higgins		1911–1913	
25th	James H. Kay		January 5, 1913 – 1923	
26th	Edmond P. Talbot		1923–1926	Sitting in 1923. First mayor of French-Canadian descent.
27th	W. Harry Monks		1927–1928	
28th	Edmond P. Talbot		1929–1930	First mayor under city manager form of government.
29th	Daniel F. Sullivan		1931–1932	
30th	Joseph Leo Hurley		1933–1934	Final mayor under city manager form of government.
31st	Alexander C. Murray		1935–1945	
32nd	William P. Grant		1946–1951	
33rd	John F. Kane		1952–1957	
34th	John M. Arruda		1958–1963	First mayor of Portuguese descent.
35th	Roland G. Desmarais		1964–1967	
36th	Nicholas W. Mitchell		1968–1971	
37th	Wilfred C. Driscoll		1972–1978	
38th	Carlton M. Viveiros		1978 – December 23, 1990	Resigned to become clerk-magistrate of the Southeastern District Housing Court.
Acting	Daniel Bogan		December 23, 1990 – June 25, 1991	Acting mayor.
39th	John R. Mitchell		June 25, 1991 – January 1996	
40th	Edward M. Lambert Jr.		January 1996 – October 26, 2007	Resigned to accept a position at the University of Massachusetts.
Acting	William F. Whitty		October 26, 2007 – January 7, 2008	Acting mayor.
41st	Robert Correia		January 7, 2008 – January 4, 2010	Lost re-election bid when he finished third in a field of six in the preliminary election.
42nd	William A. Flanagan		January 4, 2010 – December 29, 2014	Lost recall election held on December 16, 2014.
43rd	Sam Sutter		December 29, 2014 – January 4, 2016	Elected mayor on the same ballot that recalled William Flanagan. Lost election to a full term in November 2015.
44th	Jasiel Correia		January 4, 2016 – January 6, 2020	Youngest mayor elected at 23 years old. First mayor of Cape Verdean descent. Recalled yet re-elected on March 12, 2019. Lost re-election in November, 2019.
Acting	Clifford Ponte		October 16, 2019 – January 6, 2020	As President of the Fall River City Council, Ponte became Acting Mayor when Mayor Jasiel Correia took a leave of absence.
45th	Paul E. Coogan		January 6, 2020	Elected mayor in November 2019.

== City managers ==
Fall River had a city manager from 1929 until 1935.

#	City manager	Picture	Term	Notes
1st	Edward F. Harrington		1929–1931	
2nd	J. Walter Ackerman		1931–1933	
3rd	Alexander C. Murray		1933–1935	Served as mayor upon abolition of office.

== See also ==
- List of selectmen of Fall River, Massachusetts
- History of Fall River, Massachusetts
