= James Buffington (politician) =

American politician (1817–1875)

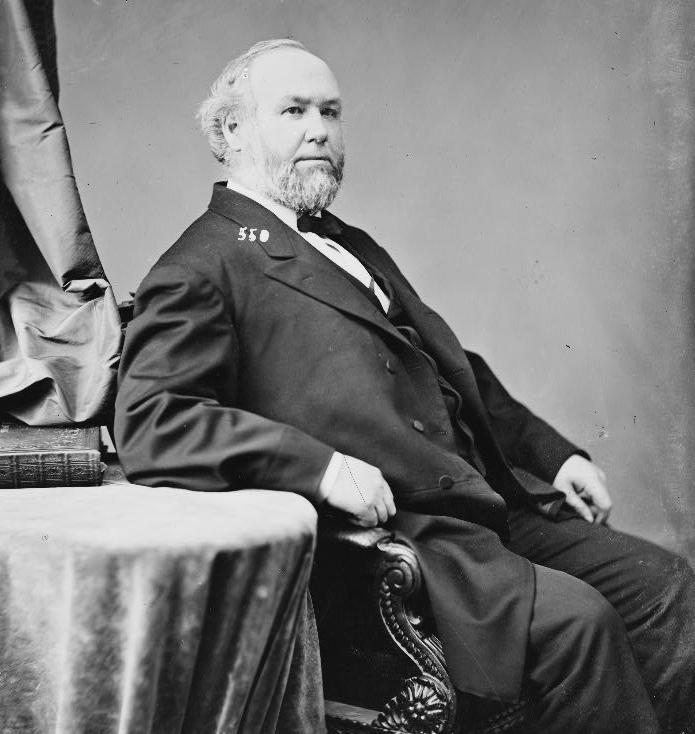
- Buffington, 1860–1875

Member of the U.S. House of Representatives from Massachusetts
- In office March 4, 1855 – March 3, 1863
- Preceded by: Samuel L. Crocker
- Succeeded by: Oakes Ames
- Constituency: 2nd district
- In office March 4, 1869 – March 7, 1875
- Preceded by: Thomas D. Eliot
- Succeeded by: William W. Crapo
- Constituency: 1st district

Personal details
- Born: March 16, 1817 Fall River, Massachusetts, U.S.
- Died: March 7, 1875 (aged 57) Fall River, Massachusetts, U.S.
- Resting place: Oak Grove Cemetery
- Party: Republican

James Buffington (March 16, 1817 – March 7, 1875) (also known as "Buffinton") was a member of the United States House of Representatives from Massachusetts. He was born in Fall River on March 16, 1817. He attended the common schools, and Friends College in Providence, Rhode Island. He studied medicine but never practiced, then engaged in mercantile pursuits. He was a member of the Fall River Board of Selectmen from 1851 to 1854, and served as the first Mayor of Fall River under the new city government from 1854 to 1855. He was elected as a candidate of the American Party to the Thirty-fourth Congress and as a Republican to the three succeeding Congresses (March 4, 1855 – March 3, 1863). Buffington was chairman of the Committee on Accounts (Thirty-seventh Congress, Forty-second and Forty-third Congresses), and the Committee on Military Affairs (Thirty-seventh Congress).

Buffington was mustered into the service April 24, 1861, and discharged June 15, 1861. He was not a candidate for renomination to Congress in 1862. He was a special agent of the United States Treasury and was an internal revenue collector for the district of Massachusetts 1867–1869. Buffington was elected to the Forty-first and to the three succeeding Congresses and served from March 4, 1869, until his death in Fall River on March 7, 1875. His interment was in Oak Grove Cemetery in Fall River.

== See also ==
- List of mayors of Fall River, Massachusetts
- List of members of the United States Congress who died in office (1790–1899)

U.S. House of Representatives
Preceded by Samuel L. Crocker	Member of the U.S. House of Representatives from Massachusetts's 2nd congressional district March 4, 1855 – March 3, 1863	Succeeded by Oakes Ames
Preceded by Thomas D. Eliot	Member of the U.S. House of Representatives from Massachusetts's 1st congressional district March 4, 1869 – March 7, 1875	Succeeded by William W. Crapo
