= Alexander C. Murray =

American politician

Mayor of Fall River, Massachusetts
- In office 1935–1945
- Preceded by: Joseph L. Hurley
- Succeeded by: William P. Grant

City Manager of Fall River, Massachusetts
- In office 1933–1935
- Preceded by: J. Walter Ackerman
- Succeeded by: Position eliminated

Personal details
- Party: Republican

Alexander C. Murray was an American engineer and politician who served as Mayor of Fall River, Massachusetts from 1935 to 1945.

== Early career ==
In 1927, Murray was appointed as city engineer by mayor W. Harry Monks. In 1931, city manager J. Walter Ackerman chose Murray to serve as the city's first commissioner of public works. In 1933 he succeeded Ackerman as city manager.

== Mayor ==
In 1934, the city switched forms of government and Murray ran for mayor. He defeated former mayor Edmond P. Talbot. He was reelected over Tablot again in 1936 by 317 votes. In 1937, after an employee strike threatened the Fall River Line, Murray worked with Mayors Henry S. Wheeler of Newport, Rhode Island and Leo Carney of New Bedford, Massachusetts to prevent New England Steamship from shutting down the line. However, the company chose to liquidate rather than negotiate with the union and the line closed. Murray was elected to his third term in 1938 by defeating former police commissioner Dr. Owen L. Eagan by 1,922 votes. In 1940 he defeated Eagan by 4,601 in a three-way contest that also involved Talbot as a sticker candidate. In 1941, the city regained control over its finances from the Commonwealth of Massachusetts. In 1942, Murray again defeated Talbot, this time for a 3-year term. In February 1943, a complaint was filed against Murray under the Corrupt Practices Act regarding election expenses. The complaint sought to declare Murray's election void. The removal proceedings were dismissed by a three-judge panel of the Massachusetts Supreme Judicial Court with the stipulation that he amend his campaign expense report within 10 days to include a $275 contribution made for radio time. In 1943, Murray dealt with a milk shortage that affected Fall River and surrounding communities.
