= John W. Cummings =

American politician

John William Cummings
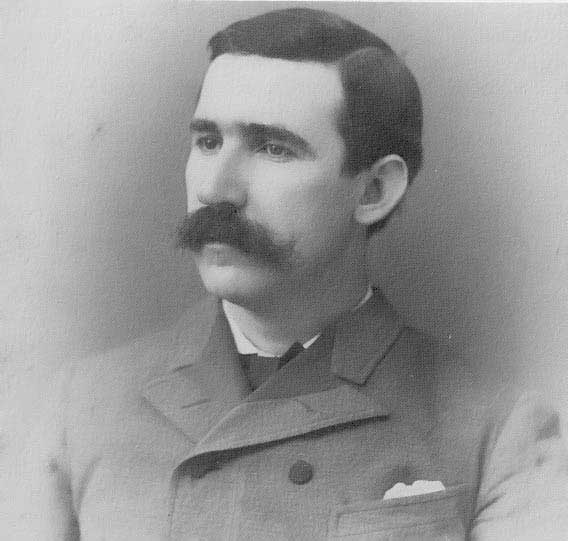
- John William Cummings at the time he was the Mayor of Fall River, Massachusetts

Delegate to the 1917 Massachusetts Constitutional Convention
- In office June 6, 1917 – August 13, 1919

14th Mayor of Fall River, Massachusetts
- In office 1885–1885
- Preceded by: Milton Reed
- Succeeded by: William S. Greene

16th Mayor of Fall River, Massachusetts
- In office 1887–1888
- Preceded by: William S. Greene
- Succeeded by: James Frederick Jackson
- Majority: 261 in 1886, and 196 in 1887.

Member of the Massachusetts State Senate
- In office 1883–1883

Member of the Massachusetts House of Representatives 8th Bristol District
- In office 1878–1878

Personal details
- Born: August 25, 1855 Stockport, England
- Died: August 28, 1929 (aged 74)
- Party: Independent, (1917–1918)
- Spouse: Mary Catherine Cecelia Brennan
- Children: Mary Cummings, b. June 28, 1884, d. 1884; Margaret Cummings, b. September 30, 1885, d. April 8, 1968. Sarah T. Cummings, b. June 11, 1887, d. abt. 1920. John Brennan Cummings b. June 19, 1889, d. August 28, 1978. Mary C. Cummings, b. March 9, 1891, d. May 2, 1971. Frances Mary Cummings, b. October 16, 1900 d. January 23, 1981. Joseph W. Cummings, b. March 10, 1894, d. January 21, 1981.
- Education: Public schools of Providence, Rhode Island and Fall River, Massachusetts
- Profession: Lawyer

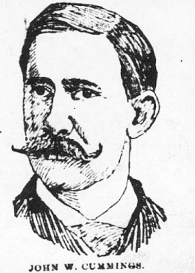
John W. Cummings in March 1895, from The Fall River Daily Globe.

John William Cummings (August 25, 1855 – August 28, 1929) was an American lawyer and politician who served in both branches of the Massachusetts legislature, in the Massachusetts Constitutional Convention of 1917, and as the 14th and 16th Mayor of Fall River, Massachusetts.

== See also ==
- 1878 Massachusetts legislature

Political offices
Preceded by Milton Reed	14th Mayor of Fall River, Massachusetts; 1885–1885	Succeeded by William S. Greene
Preceded by William S. Greene	16th Mayor of Fall River, Massachusetts; 1887–1888	Succeeded by James Frederick Jackson
