= Francis B. Fay =

American politician

Francis Ball Fay
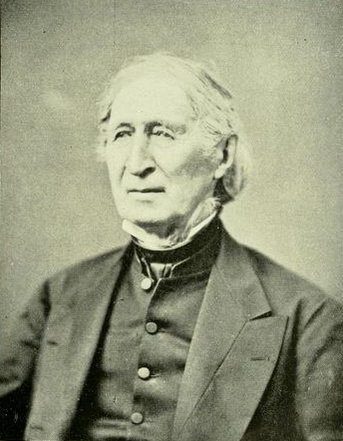

Member of the U.S. House of Representatives from Massachusetts's 2nd district
- In office December 13, 1852 – March 3, 1853
- Preceded by: Robert Rantoul Jr.
- Succeeded by: Samuel L. Crocker

1st Mayor of Chelsea, Massachusetts
- In office 1857–1857
- Preceded by: Board of Selectmen
- Succeeded by: Hosea Ilsley

Member of the Massachusetts Senate
- In office 1843-1845; 1848; 1868

Personal details
- Born: June 12, 1793 Southborough, Massachusetts, U.S.
- Died: October 6, 1876 (aged 83) South Lancaster, Massachusetts, U.S.
- Party: Whig
- Spouse: Nancy Brigham
- Children: Frank B. Fay

Francis Ball Fay (June 12, 1793 – October 6, 1876) was a merchant, American politician, and philanthropist. He served as U.S. Representative from Massachusetts.

== Biography ==
Francis Ball Fay was born in Southborough, Massachusetts. His parents were poor, and he had little education. At the age of 18, he "bought his time" of his father for $80 a year. (The term refers to the practice of sons owing their fathers time and dedication until they were 21; to pursue other occupations, sons were expected to "buy their time" to reimburse their fathers for lost labor.) Fay attended the public scales in Dock Square, Boston, in 1811–12, then served as market man and butcher, and in 1817 became a merchant in Southborough.

From 1816 to 1824 Fay was an active member of the state militia, reaching the rank of colonel. He was postmaster of Southborough from September 15, 1817, to March 29, 1832. He was deputy sheriff of Worcester County 1824–1830. He served as member of the Massachusetts General Court (the lower house of representatives) in 1830 and 1831.

In 1831 he moved to Chelsea, Massachusetts, built one of the first substantial houses there, and brought the first ferry-boats running to Boston. Fay represented Chelsea in the Massachusetts General Court from 1834 to 1836 and in 1840, and served in the State Senate 1843–1845 and again in 1848. Fay served as the first Mayor of Chelsea in 1857, where he was also the first president of Chelsea's oldest bank, the Chelsea Savings Bank, incorporated in 1854.

While a resident of Chelsea, Fay also acted as an investigative agent for wealthy Boston speculators looking to invest in the newly opened western territories. Among his papers remain several reports of his findings, including a 12-page account of a harrowing two-month trip from Boston to St. Louis and back, providing a very rare view of travel at the dawn of the railroad age.

Fay was elected as a Whig to the Thirty-second Congress to fill the vacancy caused by the death of Robert Rantoul, Jr., and served from December 13, 1852, to March 3, 1853. He chose not to run for another term.

In 1852, Fay endowed his hometown of Southborough, Massachusetts with a public lending library, reputed to be the second earliest free municipal library in the country, predating by a few months the Boston Public Library. The institution was named in Fay's honor.

After declining to serve a second term as Chelsea's mayor, Fay moved to Lancaster in 1858 to be closer to the Lancaster Industrial School for Girls he had helped found, and with which he was connected as commissioner, trustee, and treasurer from 1854 to 1864. This groundbreaking facility was the country's first state reform school for girls, and as an alternative to the then common practice of imprisoning juvenile delinquents, was one of the most progressive correctional institutions for women of its day.

Fay was a member of the State Senate one final time in 1868.

He died in South Lancaster, Massachusetts, October 6, 1876. He was interred in Woodlawn Cemetery, Everett, Massachusetts.

== See also ==
- 1868 Massachusetts legislature

== Notes ==
U.S. House of Representatives
Preceded by Robert Rantoul, Jr.	Member of the U.S. House of Representatives from Massachusetts's 2nd congressional district December 13, 1852 – March 3, 1853	Succeeded by Samuel L. Crocker
Political offices
Preceded by Board of Selectmen	1st Mayor of Chelsea, Massachusetts; 1857–1857	Succeeded by Hosea Ilsley
