= Frank B. Fay =

American politician

Frank B Fay
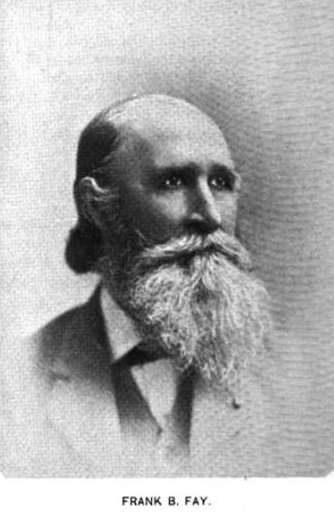

3rd Mayor of Chelsea, Massachusetts
- In office 1861–1863
- Preceded by: Hosea Ilsley
- Succeeded by: Eustace C. Fitz

Personal details
- Born: January 24, 1821 Southborough, Massachusetts, U.S.
- Died: March 20, 1904 (aged 83) Chelsea, Massachusetts, U.S.
- Party: Whig, Republican
- Parent: Francis B. Fay (father)

Franklin Brigham Fay (January 24, 1821 – March 20, 1904) was a Massachusetts businessman and politician who served as the third Mayor of Chelsea, Massachusetts, and in both houses of the Massachusetts legislature.

== Biography ==
He was born on Southborough, Massachusetts to Colonel Francis B. Fay and Nancy (Brigham) Fay. He was educated at the Salem Street Academy in Boston.

Fay was married in St. Albans, Vermont on October 14, 1845, to Rebekah L. Bridges. They had three children: Norman W.Fay, Harry F. Fay, and Sybil C. Fay, wife of J. W. Clark, Jr. of New York.

His early career was in manufacturing and finance. He was a founder of the firm of Fay @ Co. and was a partner in several manufacturing firms.

His political career started as a member of the Chelsea school board in 1858, and he served as mayor of Chelsea from 1861 to 1863.

Despite being a mayor, Fay took it upon himself to visit the front numerous times during the Civil War to ensure that the sick and wounded were cared for. He provided assistance after the battles of first and second Bull Run, evacuation of Yorktown, seven days' fight, Antietam, Fredericksburg, Chancellorsville, Gettysburg, Cold Harbor, "The Wilderness," and during the siege of Petersburg until it was evacuated.

In 1864, after leaving office as mayor, he suggested to the United States Sanitary Commission that they establish an Auxiliary Relief Corps to care for soldiers disabled by wounds or disease. The Commission agreed and Fay was made chief of the new organization. He resigned from this position in January 1865 but remained at the front until the fall or Richmond in April. He also served on the Massachusetts Allotment Commission which was, effectively, a money wiring service so soldiers could send home a portion of their pay to support their families.

He served a one year term as a state representative in 1857 and, in 1867, he served a one year term as a Massachusetts state senator. As a legislator, he advocated for more humane conditions in prisons and the education of the disabled.

He was elected as a 3rd class (honorary) companion of the Military Order of the Loyal Legion of the United States in recognition of his support for the Union during the American Civil War.

== See also ==
- 88th Massachusetts General Court (1867)

== Notes ==
- Rand, John C., ed. (1890). "Fay, Frank B." . One of a Thousand: A Series of Biographical Sketches of One Thousand Representative Men Resident in the Commonwealth of Massachusetts, A. D. 1888–'89. Boston: First National Publishing Company. pp. 209–211.

Political offices
Preceded by Hosea Ilsley	3rd Mayor of Chelsea, Massachusetts; 1861-1863	Succeeded by Eustace C. Fitz
