= 1818–19 United States House of Representatives elections =

House elections for the 16th U.S. Congress

- April 26, 1818 – August 12, 1819 (Note: Excludes states admitted after the start of the 16th Congress)

All 186 (Note: Includes late elections) seats in the United States House of Representatives 94 seats needed for a majority
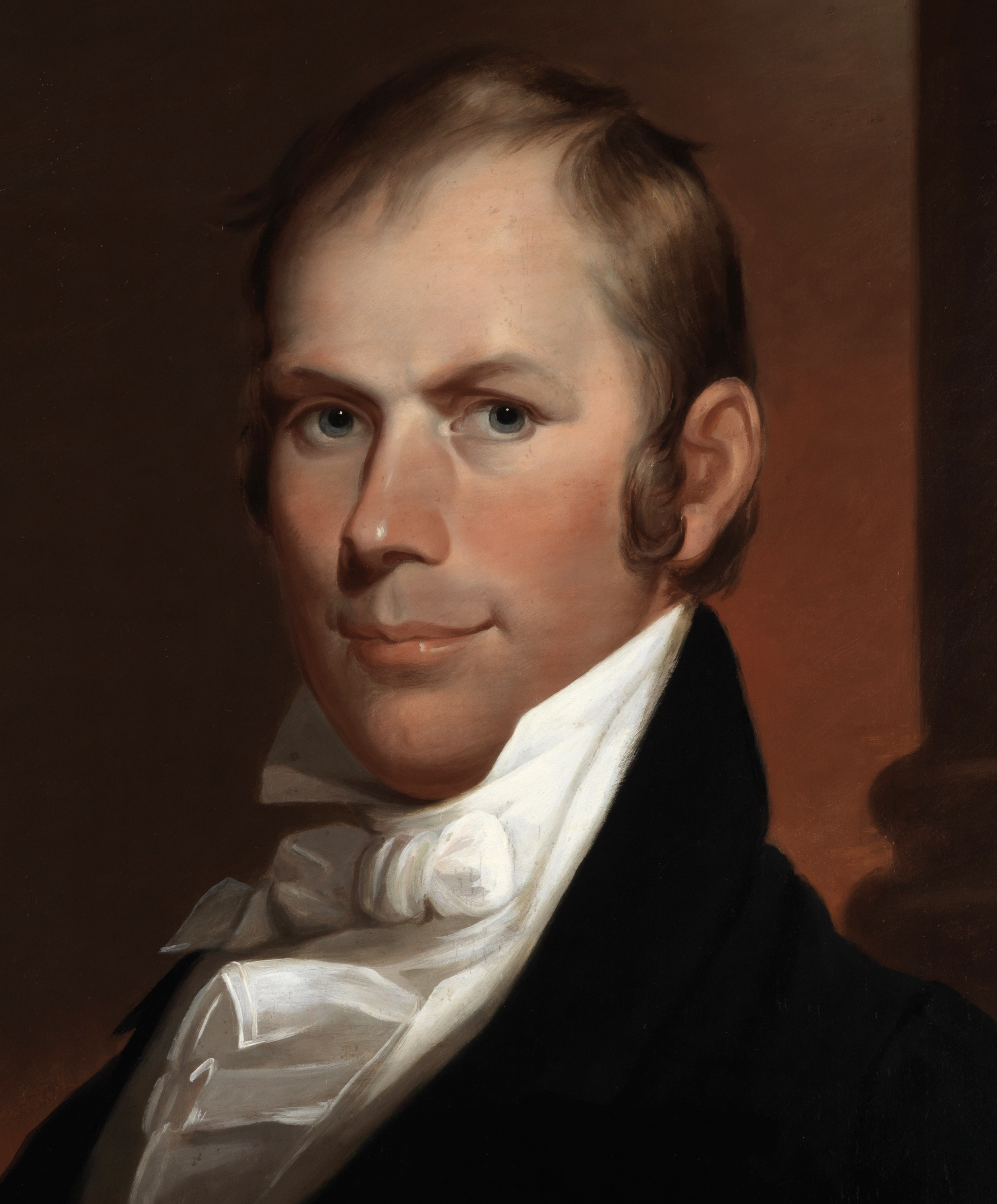

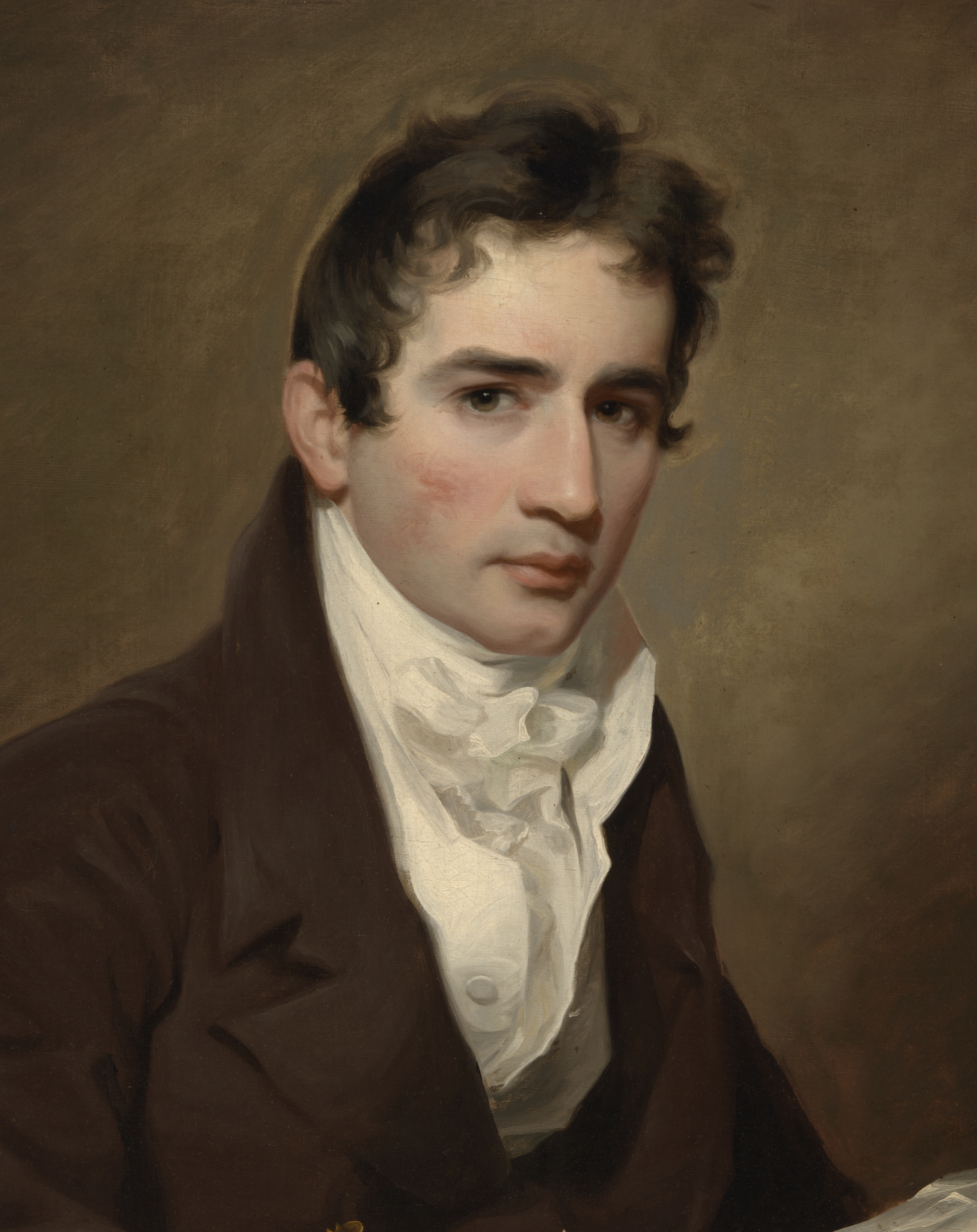
	Majority party	Minority party
Leader	Henry Clay	John Sergeant
Party	Democratic-Republican	Federalist
Leader's seat	Kentucky 2nd	Pennsylvania 1st
Last election	145 seats	40 seats
Seats won	158	28
Seat change	▲13	▼12
Speaker before election
Henry Clay
Democratic-Republican
Elected Speaker
Henry Clay
Democratic-Republican

The 1818–19 United States House of Representatives elections were held on various dates in various states between April 26, 1818, and August 12, 1819. Each state set its own date for its elections to the House of Representatives before the first session of the 16th United States Congress convened on December 6, 1819. They occurred during President James Monroe's first term. Also, newly admitted Alabama elected its first representatives in September 1819, increasing the size of the House to 186 seats.

This election occurred in a politically uneventful period marked by exceptionally low levels of partisan rivalry known as the Era of Good Feelings. The weak Federalist Party, with limited influence in few states, no longer effectively opposed the Democratic-Republican Party, which increased its large majority.

== Election summaries ==
Illinois was admitted in 1818, adding one seat.

Alabama and Maine were admitted during the 16th Congress. One new seat was added for Alabama, while Maine, splitting from Massachusetts, simply retained its Representatives.

↓
158	28
Democratic-Republican	Federalist

State	Type	↑ Date	Total seats	Democratic- Republican		Federalist	
State	Type	↑ Date	Total seats	Seats	Change	Seats	Change
New York	Districts	April 28–30, 1818	27	21	▼1	6	▲1
Louisiana	At-large	July 6–8, 1818	1	1	Steady	0	Steady
Indiana	At-large	August 3, 1818	1	1	Steady	0	Steady
Kentucky	Districts	August 3, 1818	10	10	Steady	0	Steady
Rhode Island	At-large	August 25, 1818	2	2	▲2	0	▼2
Vermont	At-large	September 1, 1818	6	6	Steady	0	Steady
Connecticut	At-large	September 21, 1818	7	7	▲7	0	▼7
Delaware	At-large	October 5, 1818	2	1	Steady	1	Steady
Georgia	At-large	October 5, 1818	6	6	Steady	0	Steady
Maryland	Districts	October 5, 1818	9	6	▲1	3	▼1
South Carolina	Districts	October 12–13, 1818	9	9	Steady	0	Steady
New Jersey	At-large	October 13, 1818	6	6	Steady	0	Steady
Ohio	Districts	October 13, 1818	6	5	Steady	1	Steady
Pennsylvania	Districts	October 13, 1818	23	19	Steady	4	Steady
Massachusetts	Districts	November 2, 1818	20	13	▲4	7	▼4
Late elections (after the March 4, 1819 beginning of the term)
Virginia	Districts	April 1819	23	20	Steady	3	Steady
New Hampshire	At-large	March 9, 1819	6	6	Steady	0	Steady
Illinois	At-large	August 2, 1819	1	1	Steady	0	Steady
Mississippi	At-large	August 2–3, 1819	1	1	Steady	0	Steady
Tennessee	Districts	August 5–6, 1819	6	6	Steady	0	Steady
North Carolina	Districts	August 12, 1819	13	10	▼1	3	▲1
Alabama	At-large	September 20–21, 1819	1	1	▲1	0	Steady
Total of regular elections			186	158 84.9%	▲13	28 15.1%	▼12

House seats
Dem-Republican	84.95%
Federalist	15.05%

== Special elections ==
There were special elections in 1818 and 1819 to the 15th United States Congress and 16th United States Congress.

Special elections are sorted by date then district.

=== 15th Congress ===
District	Incumbent			This race	
District	Member	Party	First elected	Results	Candidates
Connecticut at-large	Uriel Holmes	Federalist	1816	Incumbent resigned sometime in 1818. New member elected before November 1818 and seated November 16, 1818. Democratic-Republican gain. Winner was not a candidate for the next term; see below.	▌ ✓ Sylvester Gilbert (Democratic-Republican) 48.6%; ▌Lyman Law (Federalist) 23.8%; ▌Asa Bacon Jr. (Federalist) 15.2%; ▌Epaphroditus Champion (Federalist) 7.0%; Others: ▌Lewis B. Sturges (Federalist) 1.8%; ▌Charles Dennison (Federalist) 1.5%; ▌Nathan Smith (Federalist) 1.1%; ▌John Davenport Jr. (Federalist) <1%; ▌Benjamin Talmadge (Federalist) <1%; ▌James Gould (Federalist) <1%
North Carolina 7	Vacant			Member-elect Alexander McMillan died before this Congress began. New member elected January 1, 1818 and seated January 26, 1818. Democratic-Republican gain. Winner later lost re-election; see below.	▌ ✓ James Stewart (Democratic-Republican) 40.6%; ▌John Culpepper (Federalist)36.9%; ▌Atlas Jones (Federalist) 18.1%; ▌James Gaines (Unknown) 3.2% (Note: Party affiliation not given in source); ▌Joseph Winslow (Federalist) 1.3%
South Carolina 6 "Edgefield district"	John C. Calhoun	Democratic- Republican	1810	Incumbent resigned November 3, 1817 to become U.S. Secretary of War. New member elected in January 1818 and seated February 9, 1818. Democratic-Republican hold. Winner later re-elected; see below.	▌ ✓ Eldred Simkins (Democratic-Republican) 40.8%; ▌William Butler (Democratic-Republican) 30.4%; ▌Joseph Black (Democratic-Republican) 28.8%
Massachusetts 20 "7th Eastern district" District of Maine	Albion K. Parris	Democratic- Republican	1814	Incumbent resigned February 3, 1818. New member elected March 16, 1818 and seated November 16, 1818. Democratic-Republican hold. Winner later re-elected; see below.	▌ ✓ Enoch Lincoln (Democratic-Republican) 57.0%; ▌Judah Dana (Unknown) 25.7%; ▌Samuel A. Bradley (Federalist) 17.3%
Pennsylvania 6	John Ross	Democratic- Republican	1808	Incumbent resigned February 24, 1818 to become President Judge of Pennsylvania's 7th Judicial Circuit. New member elected March 3, 1818 and seated March 24, 1818. Democratic-Republican hold. Winner resigned July 6, 1818; see below.	▌ ✓ Thomas J. Rogers (Democratic-Republican) 93.0%; ▌Samuel Sitgreaves (Federalist) 7.0%
Pennsylvania 4	Jacob Spangler	Democratic- Republican	1816	Incumbent resigned April 20, 1818. New member elected between April and November 1818 and seated November 16, 1818. Democratic-Republican hold. Winner also elected to the next term; see below.	▌ ✓ Jacob Hostetter (Democratic-Republican) 49.7%; ▌Samuel Bacon (Democratic-Republican) 44.7%; ▌John Clark (Unknown) 5.7%
Louisiana at-large	Thomas B. Robertson	Democratic- Republican	1812	Incumbent resigned April 20, 1818. New member elected July 6–8, 1818 and seated November 16, 1818. Democratic-Republican hold. Winner also elected to the next term; see below.	▌ ✓ Thomas Butler (Democratic-Republican) 45.1%; ▌Edward Livingston (Unknown) 33.4%; ▌Joseph Johnston (Unknown) 19.6%; ▌Fulwar Skipwith (Unknown) 1.5%
Pennsylvania 6	Samuel D. Ingham	Democratic- Republican	1818 (special)	Incumbent resigned July 6, 1818. New member elected October 13, 1818 and seated November 16, 1818. Democratic-Republican hold. Winner also elected to the next term; see below.	▌ ✓ Samuel Moore (Democratic-Republican); Uncontested
North Carolina 11	Daniel Forney	Democratic- Republican	1815	Incumbent resigned in 1818. New member elected November 7, 1818 and seated December 2, 1818. Federalist gain. Winner later re-elected; see below.	▌ ✓ William Davidson (Federalist) 51.9%; ▌John Reid (Democratic-Republican) 48.1%
Virginia 19	Peterson Goodwyn	Democratic- Republican	1803	Incumbent died February 21, 1818. New member elected November 16, 1818 and seated April 21, 1818. Democratic-Republican hold. Winner later lost re-election; see below.	▌ ✓ John Pegram (Democratic-Republican) 53.9%; ▌James Jones (Democratic-Republican) 46.1%
Georgia at-large	John Forsyth	Democratic- Republican	1812	Incumbent resigned November 23, 1818 when elected U.S. Senator. New member elected January 4, 1819 and seated February 18, 1819 both to finish the term and to the next term. Democratic-Republican hold.	▌ ✓ Robert R. Reid (Democratic-Republican) 66.7%; ▌Homer Virgil Milton (Unknown) 33.3%
North Carolina 10	George Mumford	Democratic- Republican	1817	Incumbent died December 31, 1818. New member elected between January 1, 1819, and February 11, 1819, and seated February 11, 1819. Democratic-Republican hold. Winner was later re-elected to the next term; see below.	▌ ✓ Charles Fisher (Democratic-Republican) 48.6%; [data missing]

=== 16th Congress ===
District	Incumbent			This race	
District	Member	Party	First elected	Results	Candidates
[data missing]

== Alabama ==
District	Incumbent			This race	
District	Member	Party	First elected	Results	Candidates
Alabama at-large	None (new state)			Alabama was admitted as a state December 14, 1819. Incumbent territorial delegate re-elected as member and seated December 14, 1819. Democratic-Republican gain.	▌ ✓ John Crowell (Democratic-Republican) 53.2%; ▌Henry Chambers (Democratic-Republican) 46.8%

== Alabama Territory ==
See Non-voting delegates, below.

== Arkansas Territory ==
See Non-voting delegates, below.

== Connecticut ==
Connecticut elected its members September 21, 1818. The delegation changed from seven Federalists to seven Democratic-Republicans then the retirement of six incumbents and the party-change of the seventh.

District	Incumbent			This race	
District	Member	Party	First elected	Results	Candidates (Note: Only candidates with at least 1% of the vote listed.)
Connecticut at-large 7 seats on a general ticket	Ebenezer Huntington	Federalist	1817 (special)	Incumbent retired. Democratic-Republican gain.	▌ ✓ James Stevens (Democratic-Republican) 10.3%; ▌ ✓ Jonathan O. Moseley (Democratic-Republican) 9.8%; ▌ ✓ Gideon Tomlinson (Democratic-Republican) 9.5%; ▌ ✓ Elisha Phelps (Democratic-Republican) 8.7%; ▌ ✓ John Russ (Democratic-Republican) 7.5%; ▌ ✓ Henry W. Edwards (Democratic-Republican) 7.4%; ▌ ✓ Samuel A. Foot (Democratic-Republican) 7.3%; ▌David Bolles (Democratic-Republican) 5.9%; ▌Ralph Ingersoll (Democratic-Republican) 5.4%; ▌Noyes Barber (Democratic-Republican) 4.2%; ▌Christopher Manwarring (Democratic-Republican) 4.2%; ▌Orange Merwin (Democratic-Republican) 4.1%; ▌John T. Peters (Democratic-Republican) 4.0%; ▌Calvin Willey (Democratic-Republican) 3.9%; ▌Elisha Tracy (Democratic-Republican) 3.3%; ▌Seth P. Beers (Democratic-Republican) 3.0%
Connecticut at-large 7 seats on a general ticket	Jonathan O. Moseley	Federalist	1804	Incumbent changed parties and re-elected. Democratic-Republican gain.	
Connecticut at-large 7 seats on a general ticket	Samuel B. Sherwood	Federalist	1816	Incumbent retired. Democratic-Republican gain.	
Connecticut at-large 7 seats on a general ticket	Timothy Pitkin	Federalist	1805 (special)	Incumbent retired. Democratic-Republican gain.	
Connecticut at-large 7 seats on a general ticket	Nathaniel Terry	Federalist	1817 (special)	Incumbent retired. Democratic-Republican gain.	
Connecticut at-large 7 seats on a general ticket	Thomas Scott Williams	Federalist	1816	Incumbent retired. Democratic-Republican gain.	
Connecticut at-large 7 seats on a general ticket	Uriel Holmes	Federalist	1816	Incumbent resigned sometime in 1818. Democratic-Republican gain. Successor was not elected to finish the term.	

== Delaware ==
Delaware elected its members October 5, 1818.

District	Incumbent			This race	
District	Member	Party	First elected	Results	Candidates
Delaware at-large 2 seats on a general ticket	Louis McLane	Federalist	1816	Incumbent re-elected.	▌ ✓ Louis McLane (Federalist) 26.0%; ▌ ✓ Willard Hall (Democratic-Republican) 25.2%; ▌Thomas Clayton (Federalist) 24.3%; ▌George Read Jr. (Democratic-Republican) 23.6%
Delaware at-large 2 seats on a general ticket	Willard Hall	Democratic- Republican	1816	Incumbent re-elected.	▌ ✓ Louis McLane (Federalist) 26.0%; ▌ ✓ Willard Hall (Democratic-Republican) 25.2%; ▌Thomas Clayton (Federalist) 24.3%; ▌George Read Jr. (Democratic-Republican) 23.6%

== Georgia ==
Georgia elected its members October 5, 1818.

District	Incumbent			This race	
District	Member	Party	First elected	Results	Candidates
Georgia at-large 6 seats on a general ticket	William Terrell	Democratic-Republican	1816	Incumbent re-elected.	▌ ✓ John Forsyth (Democratic-Republican) 16.7%; ▌ ✓ John A. Cuthbert (Democratic-Republican) 15.8%; ▌ ✓ William Terrell (Democratic-Republican) 15.8%; ▌ ✓ Joel Crawford (Democratic-Republican) 15.2%; ▌ ✓ Joel Abbot (Democratic-Republican) 14.6%; ▌ ✓ Thomas W. Cobb (Democratic-Republican) 14.6%; ▌Richard Henry Wilde (Democratic-Republican) 7.4%
Georgia at-large 6 seats on a general ticket	Joel Crawford	Democratic-Republican	1816	Incumbent re-elected.	▌ ✓ John Forsyth (Democratic-Republican) 16.7%; ▌ ✓ John A. Cuthbert (Democratic-Republican) 15.8%; ▌ ✓ William Terrell (Democratic-Republican) 15.8%; ▌ ✓ Joel Crawford (Democratic-Republican) 15.2%; ▌ ✓ Joel Abbot (Democratic-Republican) 14.6%; ▌ ✓ Thomas W. Cobb (Democratic-Republican) 14.6%; ▌Richard Henry Wilde (Democratic-Republican) 7.4%
Georgia at-large 6 seats on a general ticket	Joel Abbot	Democratic-Republican	1816	Incumbent re-elected.	▌ ✓ John Forsyth (Democratic-Republican) 16.7%; ▌ ✓ John A. Cuthbert (Democratic-Republican) 15.8%; ▌ ✓ William Terrell (Democratic-Republican) 15.8%; ▌ ✓ Joel Crawford (Democratic-Republican) 15.2%; ▌ ✓ Joel Abbot (Democratic-Republican) 14.6%; ▌ ✓ Thomas W. Cobb (Democratic-Republican) 14.6%; ▌Richard Henry Wilde (Democratic-Republican) 7.4%
Georgia at-large 6 seats on a general ticket	Zadock Cook	Democratic-Republican	1816 (special)	Incumbent retired. Democratic-Republican hold.	▌ ✓ John Forsyth (Democratic-Republican) 16.7%; ▌ ✓ John A. Cuthbert (Democratic-Republican) 15.8%; ▌ ✓ William Terrell (Democratic-Republican) 15.8%; ▌ ✓ Joel Crawford (Democratic-Republican) 15.2%; ▌ ✓ Joel Abbot (Democratic-Republican) 14.6%; ▌ ✓ Thomas W. Cobb (Democratic-Republican) 14.6%; ▌Richard Henry Wilde (Democratic-Republican) 7.4%
Georgia at-large 6 seats on a general ticket	John Forsyth	Democratic-Republican	1812	Incumbent re-elected but declined the seat and resigned November 23, 1818, having been elected U.S. Senator, leading to a special election.	▌ ✓ John Forsyth (Democratic-Republican) 16.7%; ▌ ✓ John A. Cuthbert (Democratic-Republican) 15.8%; ▌ ✓ William Terrell (Democratic-Republican) 15.8%; ▌ ✓ Joel Crawford (Democratic-Republican) 15.2%; ▌ ✓ Joel Abbot (Democratic-Republican) 14.6%; ▌ ✓ Thomas W. Cobb (Democratic-Republican) 14.6%; ▌Richard Henry Wilde (Democratic-Republican) 7.4%
Georgia at-large 6 seats on a general ticket	Thomas W. Cobb	Democratic-Republican	1816	Incumbent re-elected.	▌ ✓ John Forsyth (Democratic-Republican) 16.7%; ▌ ✓ John A. Cuthbert (Democratic-Republican) 15.8%; ▌ ✓ William Terrell (Democratic-Republican) 15.8%; ▌ ✓ Joel Crawford (Democratic-Republican) 15.2%; ▌ ✓ Joel Abbot (Democratic-Republican) 14.6%; ▌ ✓ Thomas W. Cobb (Democratic-Republican) 14.6%; ▌Richard Henry Wilde (Democratic-Republican) 7.4%

== Illinois ==
Illinois elected its member August 2, 1819, after the new congress began but before the first session convened. The incumbent had just been elected to the new seat in late 1818.

=== 15th Congress ===
District	Incumbent			This race	
District	Member	Party	First elected	Results	Candidates
Illinois at-large	None (new state)			Illinois was admitted December 3, 1818. New member elected in 1818 and seated December 4, 1818 to finish the term ending March 3, 1819. Democratic-Republican gain. The next year, the winner lost re-election; see below.	▌ ✓ John McLean (Democratic-Republican) 50.2%; ▌Daniel P. Cook (Democratic-Republican) 49.8%

=== 16th Congress ===
District	Incumbent			This race	
District	Member	Party	First elected	Results	Candidates
Illinois at-large	John McLean	Democratic- Republican	1818 (Note: Late election to the 15th Congress)	Incumbent lost re-election. Democratic-Republican hold.	▌ ✓ Daniel P. Cook (Democratic-Republican) 59.4%; ▌John McLean (Democratic-Republican) 40.6%

== Indiana ==
Indiana re-elected its member August 3, 1818.

District	Incumbent			This race	
District	Member	Party	First elected	Results	Candidates
Indiana at-large	William Hendricks	Democratic- Republican	1816	Incumbent re-elected.	▌ ✓ William Hendricks (Democratic-Republican) 90.5%; ▌Reuben W. Nelson (Unknown) 9.5%

== Kentucky ==
Kentucky elected its members August 3, 1818.

District	Incumbent			This race	
District	Member	Party	First elected	Results	Candidates
Kentucky 1	David Trimble	Democratic-Republican	1816	Incumbent re-elected.	▌ ✓ David Trimble (Democratic-Republican) 70.6%; ▌Thomas Fletcher (Democratic-Republican) 29.4%
Kentucky 2	Henry Clay	Democratic-Republican	1810; 1814 (resigned); 1814; 1815 (seat declared vacant); 1815 (special)	Incumbent re-elected.	▌ ✓ Henry Clay (Democratic-Republican) 100%
Kentucky 3	Richard M. Johnson	Democratic-Republican	1806	Incumbent retired. Democratic-Republican hold.	▌ ✓ William Brown (Democratic-Republican) 59.0%; ▌Benjamin Taylor (Federalist) 41.0%
Kentucky 4	Joseph Desha	Democratic-Republican	1806	Incumbent lost re-election. Democratic-Republican hold.	▌ ✓ Thomas Metcalfe (Democratic-Republican) 61.9%; ▌Joseph Desha (Democratic-Republican) 38.1%
Kentucky 5	Anthony New	Democratic-Republican	1810; 1814 (lost); 1816	Incumbent retired. Democratic-Republican hold.	▌ ✓ Alney McLean (Democratic-Republican) 54.3%; ▌Matthew Lyon (Democratic-Republican) 45.7%
Kentucky 6	David Walker	Democratic-Republican	1816	Incumbent re-elected.	▌ ✓ David Walker (Democratic-Republican) 78.5%; ▌Francis Johnson (Democratic-Republican) 14.0%; ▌Benbrook (Note: Full name unknown) (Unknown) 7.5%
Kentucky 7	George Robertson	Democratic-Republican	1816	Incumbent re-elected.	▌ ✓ George Robertson (Democratic-Republican) 100%
Kentucky 8	Richard C. Anderson Jr.	Democratic-Republican	1816	Incumbent re-elected.	▌ ✓ Richard C. Anderson Jr. (Democratic-Republican) 100%
Kentucky 9	Tunstall Quarles	Democratic-Republican	1816	Incumbent re-elected.	▌ ✓ Tunstall Quarles (Democratic-Republican) (Note: Numbers of votes missing or incomplete in source.)
Kentucky 10	Thomas Speed	Democratic-Republican	1816	Incumbent retired. Democratic-Republican hold.	▌ ✓ Benjamin Hardin (Democratic-Republican) 31.2%; ▌Richard Rudd (Unknown) 30.9%; ▌John Rowan (Democratic-Republican) 26.0%; ▌John Hays (Unknown) 11.9%

== Louisiana ==
Louisiana elected its member July 6–8, 1818.

Louisiana held an election for the 16th Congress at the same time that it held a special election to finish the 15th Congress. Data were only available for the special election, but the general election would presumably have had very similar results, and so the results for the special election are duplicated here.

District	Incumbent			This race	
District	Member	Party	First elected	Results	Candidates
Louisiana at-large	Thomas B. Robertson	Democratic- Republican	1812	Incumbent resigned April 20, 1818. Democratic-Republican hold. Successor elected the same day to finish the current term; see above.	▌ ✓ Thomas Butler (Democratic-Republican) 45.1%; ▌Edward Livingston (Democratic-Republican) 33.4%; ▌Joseph Johnston (Unknown) 19.6%; ▌Fulwar Skipwith (Unknown) 1.5%

== Maryland ==
Maryland elected its members October 5, 1818.

District	Incumbent			This race	
District	Member	Party	First elected	Results	Candidates
Maryland 1	Philip Stuart	Federalist	1810	Incumbent retired. Federalist hold.	▌ ✓ Raphael Neale (Federalist) 39.8%; ▌Nicholas Stonestreet (Federalist) 38.6%; ▌Henry G. S. Key (Federalist) 21.5%
Maryland 2	John C. Herbert	Federalist	1814	Incumbent retired. Democratic-Republican gain.	▌ ✓ Joseph Kent (Democratic-Republican) 56.7%; ▌John C. Weems (Federalist) 43.3%
Maryland 3	George Peter	Federalist	1816	Incumbent lost re-election. Federalist hold.	▌ ✓ Henry R. Warfield (Federalist) 59.1%; ▌George Peter (Federalist) 40.9%
Maryland 4	Samuel Ringgold	Democratic- Republican	1810; 1814 (lost); 1816	Incumbent re-elected.	▌ ✓ Samuel Ringgold (Democratic-Republican) 97.7%; ▌Benjamin Galloway (Federalist) 2.1%
Maryland 5 Plural district with 2 seats	Samuel Smith	Democratic- Republican	1792; 1803 (retired); 1816	Incumbent re-elected.	▌ ✓ Samuel Smith (Democratic-Republican) 50.3%; ▌ ✓ Peter Little (Democratic-Republican) 49.7%
Maryland 5 Plural district with 2 seats	Peter Little	Democratic- Republican	1810; 1812 (lost); 1816	Incumbent re-elected.	▌ ✓ Samuel Smith (Democratic-Republican) 50.3%; ▌ ✓ Peter Little (Democratic-Republican) 49.7%
Maryland 6	Philip Reed	Democratic- Republican	1816	Incumbent lost re-election. Democratic-Republican hold.	▌ ✓ Stevenson Archer (Democratic-Republican) 56.1%; ▌Philip Reed (Democratic-Republican) 43.9%
Maryland 7	Thomas Culbreth	Democratic- Republican	1816	Incumbent re-elected.	▌ ✓ Thomas Culbreth (Democratic-Republican) 70.0%; ▌Robert Wright (Democratic-Republican) 30.0%
Maryland 8	Thomas Bayly	Federalist	1816	Incumbent re-elected.	▌ ✓ Thomas Bayly (Federalist) 98.3%; ▌Charles Goldsborough (Federalist) 1.4%

== Massachusetts ==
Massachusetts elected its members November 2, 1818. Massachusetts's electoral law required a majority for election, n Massachusetts's electoral law required a majority for electionMassachusetts's electoral law required a majority for electionecessitating additional elections in five districts on April 5, 1819, and July 26, 1819.

This was the last election in which the District of Maine — comprising congressional districts 14 through 20 — was part of Massachusetts. The District became the State of Maine during the 16th Congress.

District numbers differed between source used and elsewhere on Wikipedia; district numbers used elsewhere on Wikipedia used here.

District	Incumbent			This race	
District	Member	Party	First elected	Results	Candidates
Massachusetts 1	Jonathan Mason	Federalist	1817 (special)	Incumbent re-elected.	▌ ✓ Jonathan Mason (Federalist) 64.5%; ▌Andrew Ritchie (Democratic-Republican) 35.5%
Massachusetts 2	Nathaniel Silsbee	Democratic- Republican	1816	Incumbent re-elected.	▌ ✓ Nathaniel Silsbee (Democratic-Republican) 64.2%; ▌Timothy Pickering (Federalist) 34.5%; ▌Thomas Stevens (Federalist) 1.3%
Massachusetts 3	Jeremiah Nelson	Federalist	1804; 1806 (retired); 1814	Incumbent re-elected.	▌ ✓ Jeremiah Nelson (Federalist) 87.0%; ▌Joseph Bradley Varnum (Democratic-Republican) 7.9%; Others 5.1%
Massachusetts 4	Timothy Fuller	Democratic- Republican	1816	Incumbent re-elected.	▌ ✓ Timothy Fuller (Democratic-Republican) 63.9%; ▌Samuel P. Fay (Federalist) 36.1%
Massachusetts 5	Elijah H. Mills	Federalist	1814	Incumbent retired. Federalist hold.	First ballot (November 2, 1818): ▌Samuel Lathrop (Federalist) 48.1%; ▌Isaac C. Bates (Federalist) 22.7%; ▌Thomas Shepherd (Democratic-Republican) 19.6%; ▌Joseph Lyman (Federalist) 9.5%; Second ballot (April 5, 1819): ▌ ✓ Samuel Lathrop (Federalist) 55.5%; ▌Thomas Shepherd (Democratic-Republican) 27.7%; ▌Joseph Lyman (Federalist) 16.8%
Massachusetts 6	Samuel C. Allen	Federalist	1816	Incumbent re-elected.	▌ ✓ Samuel C. Allen (Federalist) 86.2%; ▌Elihu Lyman (Democratic-Republican) 8.0%; Others 5.8%
Massachusetts 7	Henry Shaw	Democratic- Republican	1816	Incumbent re-elected.	First ballot (November 2, 1818): ▌Henry Shaw (Democratic-Republican) 48.8; ▌Henry W. Dwight (Federalist) 47.0; ▌Ambrose Hall (Unknown) 2.7; Others 1.5%; Second ballot (April 5, 1819): ▌ ✓ Henry Shaw (Democratic-Republican) 50.8%; ▌Henry W. Dwight (Federalist) 45.8%; Others 3.4%
Massachusetts 8	Zabdiel Sampson	Democratic- Republican	1816	Incumbent re-elected.	▌ ✓ Zabdiel Sampson (Democratic-Republican) 59.6%; ▌William Bourne (Federalist) 40.4%
Massachusetts 9	Walter Folger Jr.	Democratic- Republican	1816	Incumbent re-elected.	▌ ✓ Walter Folger Jr. (Democratic-Republican) 51.3%; ▌John Reed Jr. (Federalist) 48.7%
Massachusetts 10	Marcus Morton	Democratic- Republican	1816	Re-elected	▌ ✓ Marcus Morton (Democratic-Republican) 55.0%; ▌Francis Baylies (Federalist) 43.8%; ▌Hodijah Baylies (Unknown) 1.2%
Massachusetts 11	Benjamin Adams	Federalist	1816	Incumbent re-elected.	▌ ✓ Benjamin Adams (Federalist) 59.8%; ▌Sumner Barstow (Democratic-Republican) 40.2%
Massachusetts 12	Solomon Strong	Federalist	1814	Incumbent retired. Federalist hold.	▌ ✓ Jonas Kendall (Democratic-Republican) 63.5%; ▌Edmund Cushing (Democratic-Republican) 31.7%; Others 4.8%
Massachusetts 13	Nathaniel Ruggles	Federalist	1812	Incumbent lost re-election. Democratic-Republican gain.	▌ ✓ Edward Dowse (Democratic-Republican) 54.9%; ▌Nathaniel Ruggles (Federalist) 45.1%
Massachusetts 14	John Holmes	Democratic- Republican	1816	Incumbent re-elected.	▌ ✓ John Holmes (Democratic-Republican) 93.6%; Others 6.4%
Massachusetts 15	Ezekiel Whitman	Federalist	1808; 1810 (lost); 1816	Incumbent re-elected.	▌ ✓ Ezekiel Whitman (Federalist) 54.0%; ▌Arthur Ware (Democratic-Republican) 46.0%
Massachusetts 16	Benjamin Orr	Federalist	1816	Incumbent lost re-election. Democratic-Republican gain.	First ballot (November 2, 1818): ▌Mark L. Hill (Democratic-Republican) 48.6; ▌Benjamin Orr (Federalist) 38.0; Others 13.4%; Second ballot (April 5, 1819): ▌Mark L. Hill (Democratic-Republican) 52.1% (Note: Electoral data presumably incomplete in source); ▌Benjamin Orr (Federalist) 41.3%; ▌Joshua Head (Federalist) 7.3%; Third ballot (July 26, 1819): ▌ ✓ Mark L. Hill (Democratic-Republican) 52.1%; ▌Benjamin Orr (Federalist) 47.9%
Massachusetts 17	John Wilson	Federalist	1816	Incumbent lost re-election. Democratic-Republican gain.	First ballot (November 2, 1818): ▌Martin Kinsley (Democratic-Republican) 41.3%; ▌John Wilson (Federalist) 29.9%; ▌Leonard Jarvis (Democratic-Republican) 24.7%; Others 4.1%; Second ballot (April 5, 1819): ▌Martin Kinsley (Democratic-Republican) 48.3%; ▌John Wilson (Federalist) 29.9%; ▌Leonard Jarvis (Democratic-Republican) 15.7%; Others 6.1%; Third ballot (July 26, 1819): ▌ ✓ Martin Kinsley (Democratic-Republican) 61.7%; ▌John Wilson (Federalist) 29.3%; ▌Leonard Jarvis (Democratic-Republican) 2.4%; Others 6.7%
Massachusetts 18	Thomas Rice	Federalist	1814	Incumbent lost re-election. Democratic-Republican gain.	First ballot (November 2, 1818): ▌James Parker (Democratic-Republican) 49.7%; ▌Peter Grant (Federalist) 41.8%; ▌Joshua Gage (Democratic-Republican) 5.3%; Others 3.2%; Second ballot (April 5, 1819): ▌ ✓ James Parker (Democratic-Republican) 57.3%; ▌Thomas Rice (Federalist) 34.8%; ▌Joshua Gage (Democratic-Republican) 7.2%
Massachusetts 19	Joshua Gage	Democratic- Republican	1816	Ran in the 18th district and lost re-election. Democratic-Republican hold.	▌ ✓ Joshua Cushman (Democratic-Republican) 56.1%; ▌Thomas Rice (Federalist) 43.9%
Massachusetts 20	Enoch Lincoln	Democratic- Republican	1818 (special)	Incumbent re-elected.	▌ ✓ Enoch Lincoln (Democratic-Republican) 66.6%; ▌Samuel A. Bradley (Federalist) 33.4%

== Michigan Territory ==
See Non-voting delegates, below.

== Mississippi ==
Mississippi elected its member August 2–3, 1819, after the new congress began but before the first session convened.

District	Incumbent			This race	
District	Member	Party	First elected	Results	Candidates
Mississippi at-large	George Poindexter	Democratic- Republican	1817	Incumbent retired. Democratic-Republican hold.	▌ ✓ Christopher Rankin (Democratic-Republican) 68.9%; ▌Cowles Mead (Democratic-Republican) 31.1%

== Missouri Territory ==
See Non-voting delegates, below.

== New Hampshire ==
New Hampshire elected its members March 9, 1819, after the new congress began but before the first session convened.

District	Incumbent			This race	
District	Member	Party	First elected	Results	Candidates
New Hampshire at-large 6 seats on a general ticket	Josiah Butler	Democratic-Republican	1816	Incumbent re-elected.	▌ ✓ Arthur Livermore (Democratic-Republican) 11.5%; ▌ ✓ Nathaniel Upham (Democratic-Republican) 11.1%; ▌ ✓ Josiah Butler (Democratic-Republican) 11.0%; ▌ ✓ Clifton Clagett (Democratic-Republican) 10.9%; ▌ ✓ Joseph Buffum Jr. (Democratic-Republican) 10.6%; ▌ ✓ William Plumer Jr. (Democratic-Republican) 8.8%; ▌Jeremiah Smith (Federalist) 5.9%; ▌Levi Jackson (Federalist) 5.8%; ▌Parker Noyes (Federalist) 5.8%; ▌Stephen Moody (Federalist) 5.7%; ▌Mills Olcott (Federalist) 5.6%; ▌John Haven (Federalist) 5.2%; ▌George Long (Independent) 2.3%
New Hampshire at-large 6 seats on a general ticket	Nathaniel Upham	Democratic-Republican	1816	Incumbent re-elected.	
New Hampshire at-large 6 seats on a general ticket	Clifton Clagett	Democratic-Republican	1802; 1804 (retired); 1816	Incumbent re-elected.	
New Hampshire at-large 6 seats on a general ticket	Salma Hale	Democratic-Republican	1816	Incumbent retired. Democratic-Republican hold.	
New Hampshire at-large 6 seats on a general ticket	John F. Parrott	Democratic-Republican	1816	Incumbent retired. Democratic-Republican hold.	
New Hampshire at-large 6 seats on a general ticket	Arthur Livermore	Democratic-Republican	1816	Incumbent re-elected.	

== New Jersey ==
New Jersey elected its members October 13, 1818.

District	Incumbent			This race	
District	Member	Party	First elected	Results	Candidates
New Jersey at-large 6 seats on a general ticket	John Linn	Democratic-Republican	1816	Incumbent re-elected.	▌ ✓ Ephraim Bateman (Democratic-Republican) 16.3%; ▌ ✓ John Linn (Democratic-Republican) 16.2%; ▌ ✓ Joseph Bloomfield (Democratic-Republican) 15.4%; ▌ ✓ Bernard Smith (Democratic-Republican) 15.1%; ▌ ✓ Henry Southard (Democratic-Republican) 15.0%; ▌ ✓ John Condit (Democratic-Republican) 10.1%; ▌Charles Kinsey (Democratic-Republican) 8.5%; ▌Lewis Condict (Democratic-Republican) 1.8%
New Jersey at-large 6 seats on a general ticket	Charles Kinsey	Democratic-Republican	1816	Incumbent lost re-election. Democratic-Republican hold.	▌ ✓ Ephraim Bateman (Democratic-Republican) 16.3%; ▌ ✓ John Linn (Democratic-Republican) 16.2%; ▌ ✓ Joseph Bloomfield (Democratic-Republican) 15.4%; ▌ ✓ Bernard Smith (Democratic-Republican) 15.1%; ▌ ✓ Henry Southard (Democratic-Republican) 15.0%; ▌ ✓ John Condit (Democratic-Republican) 10.1%; ▌Charles Kinsey (Democratic-Republican) 8.5%; ▌Lewis Condict (Democratic-Republican) 1.8%
New Jersey at-large 6 seats on a general ticket	Henry Southard	Democratic-Republican	1814	Incumbent re-elected.	▌ ✓ Ephraim Bateman (Democratic-Republican) 16.3%; ▌ ✓ John Linn (Democratic-Republican) 16.2%; ▌ ✓ Joseph Bloomfield (Democratic-Republican) 15.4%; ▌ ✓ Bernard Smith (Democratic-Republican) 15.1%; ▌ ✓ Henry Southard (Democratic-Republican) 15.0%; ▌ ✓ John Condit (Democratic-Republican) 10.1%; ▌Charles Kinsey (Democratic-Republican) 8.5%; ▌Lewis Condict (Democratic-Republican) 1.8%
New Jersey at-large 6 seats on a general ticket	Ephraim Bateman	Democratic-Republican	1814	Incumbent re-elected.	▌ ✓ Ephraim Bateman (Democratic-Republican) 16.3%; ▌ ✓ John Linn (Democratic-Republican) 16.2%; ▌ ✓ Joseph Bloomfield (Democratic-Republican) 15.4%; ▌ ✓ Bernard Smith (Democratic-Republican) 15.1%; ▌ ✓ Henry Southard (Democratic-Republican) 15.0%; ▌ ✓ John Condit (Democratic-Republican) 10.1%; ▌Charles Kinsey (Democratic-Republican) 8.5%; ▌Lewis Condict (Democratic-Republican) 1.8%
New Jersey at-large 6 seats on a general ticket	Joseph Bloomfield	Democratic-Republican	1816	Incumbent re-elected.	▌ ✓ Ephraim Bateman (Democratic-Republican) 16.3%; ▌ ✓ John Linn (Democratic-Republican) 16.2%; ▌ ✓ Joseph Bloomfield (Democratic-Republican) 15.4%; ▌ ✓ Bernard Smith (Democratic-Republican) 15.1%; ▌ ✓ Henry Southard (Democratic-Republican) 15.0%; ▌ ✓ John Condit (Democratic-Republican) 10.1%; ▌Charles Kinsey (Democratic-Republican) 8.5%; ▌Lewis Condict (Democratic-Republican) 1.8%
New Jersey at-large 6 seats on a general ticket	Benjamin Bennet	Democratic-Republican	1814	Incumbent lost re-election. Democratic-Republican hold.	▌ ✓ Ephraim Bateman (Democratic-Republican) 16.3%; ▌ ✓ John Linn (Democratic-Republican) 16.2%; ▌ ✓ Joseph Bloomfield (Democratic-Republican) 15.4%; ▌ ✓ Bernard Smith (Democratic-Republican) 15.1%; ▌ ✓ Henry Southard (Democratic-Republican) 15.0%; ▌ ✓ John Condit (Democratic-Republican) 10.1%; ▌Charles Kinsey (Democratic-Republican) 8.5%; ▌Lewis Condict (Democratic-Republican) 1.8%

== New York ==
New York elected its members April 28–30, 1818, the earliest of any state.

At this time, the Democratic-Republicans in New York were divided into two factions, the "Bucktails" who were opposed to Governor Dewitt Clinton's Erie Canal project, led by Martin Van Buren, and on the other side, Clinton's supporters, known as Clintonians. In many districts, the remaining Federalists allied with the Clintonians, with candidates running on a joint ticket. Several candidates who ran under that joint ticket cannot be clearly categorized, and are marked C/F. Others who ran under the joint ticket are marked by their party with a footnote indicating that they ran under the joint ticket.

District	Incumbent			This race	
District	Member	Party	First elected	Results	Candidates
New York 1 Plural district with 2 seats	George Townsend	Democratic-Republican	1814	Incumbent retired. Federalist gain. Election later disputed in favor of James Guyon Jr. (Note: In New York's 1st district, an election dispute arose. Initial returns showed the winners to be Silas Wood and Ebenezer Sage. This election was contested, however, on the grounds that there were 396 votes for "James Guyon" which, when added to the total number of votes reported for James Guyon Jr., would place Guyon in second place, above Sage. Sage never appeared to take his seat, and Guyon was awarded the seat January 14, 1820.)	▌ ✓ Silas Wood (Federalist) 26.0% (Note: Ran under Clintonian/Federalist joint ticket.); ▌ ✓ Ebenezer Sage (Democratic-Republican) 25.0%; ▌James Garretson (Clintonian/Federalist) 23.9%; ▌James Guyon Jr. (Democratic-Republican) 20.4%; "James Guyon" 4.7%
New York 1 Plural district with 2 seats	Tredwell Scudder	Democratic-Republican	1816	Incumbent retired. Democratic-Republican hold.	▌ ✓ Silas Wood (Federalist) 26.0%; ▌ ✓ Ebenezer Sage (Democratic-Republican) 25.0%; ▌James Garretson (Clintonian/Federalist) 23.9%; ▌James Guyon Jr. (Democratic-Republican) 20.4%; "James Guyon" 4.7%
New York 2 Plural district with 2 seats	William Irving	Democratic-Republican	1813 (special)	Incumbent retired. Democratic-Republican hold.	▌ ✓ Henry Meigs (Democratic-Republican) 35.9% (Note: Election contested.); ▌Peter H. Wendover (Democratic-Republican) 35.7%; ▌Barent Gardenier (Federalist) 28.4%
New York 2 Plural district with 2 seats	Peter H. Wendover	Democratic-Republican	1814	Incumbent re-elected.	▌ ✓ Henry Meigs (Democratic-Republican) 35.9%; ▌Peter H. Wendover (Democratic-Republican) 35.7%; ▌Barent Gardenier (Federalist) 28.4%
New York 3	Caleb Tompkins	Democratic-Republican	1816	Incumbent re-elected.	▌ ✓ Caleb Tompkins (Democratic-Republican) 58.3%; ▌Benjamin Isaacs (Clintonian/Federalist) 25.2%; ▌Philip Van Cortlandt (Democratic-Republican) 16.5%
New York 4	James Tallmadge Jr.	Democratic-Republican	1817 (special)	Incumbent retired. Federalist gain.	▌ ✓ Randall S. Street (Federalist) 50.6%; ▌William H. Johnson (Democratic-Republican) 49.4%
New York 5	Philip J. Schuyler	Federalist	1816	Incumbent retired. Federalist hold.	▌ ✓ James S. Strong (Federalist) 49.9%; ▌John I. Miller (Democratic-Republican) 31.7%; ▌Robert Le Roy Livingston (Federalist) 18.4%
New York 6	James W. Wilkin	Democratic-Republican	1815 (special)	Incumbent retired. Democratic-Republican hold.	▌ ✓ Walter Case (Democratic-Republican) 100%
New York 7	Josiah Hasbrouck	Democratic-Republican	1802; 1816	Incumbent retired. Democratic-Republican hold.	▌ ✓ Jacob H. De Witt (Democratic-Republican) 100%
New York 8	Dorrance Kirtland	Democratic-Republican	1816	Incumbent retired. Democratic-Republican hold.	▌ ✓ Robert Clark (Democratic-Republican) 55.5%; ▌Jabez Bostwick (Federalist) 44.5%
New York 9	Rensselaer Westerlo	Federalist	1816	Incumbent retired. Federalist hold.	▌ ✓ Solomon Van Rensselaer (Federalist) 100%
New York 10	John P. Cushman	Federalist	1816	Incumbent retired. Federalist hold.	▌ ✓ John D. Dickinson (Federalist) 52.7%; ▌William McManus (Democratic-Republican) 47.3%
New York 11	John W. Taylor	Democratic-Republican	1812	Incumbent re-elected.	▌ ✓ John W. Taylor (Democratic-Republican) 72.8%; ▌James Thompson (Federalist) 27.2%
New York 12 Plural district with 2 seats	John Savage	Democratic-Republican	1814	Incumbent retired. Democratic-Republican hold.	▌ ✓ Nathaniel Pitcher (Democratic-Republican) 37.8%; ▌ ✓ Ezra C. Gross (Democratic-Republican) 32.7%; ▌David Abel Russell (Federalist) 21.0%; ▌Halsey Rogers (Democratic-Republican) 8.5%
New York 12 Plural district with 2 seats	John Palmer	Democratic-Republican	1816	Incumbent retired. Democratic-Republican hold.	▌ ✓ Nathaniel Pitcher (Democratic-Republican) 37.8%; ▌ ✓ Ezra C. Gross (Democratic-Republican) 32.7%; ▌David Abel Russell (Federalist) 21.0%; ▌Halsey Rogers (Democratic-Republican) 8.5%
New York 13	Thomas Lawyer	Democratic-Republican	1816	Incumbent retired. Democratic-Republican hold.	▌ ✓ Harmanus Peek (Democratic-Republican) 55.9%; ▌Isaac H. Tiffany (Federalist) 44.1%
New York 14	John Herkimer	Democratic-Republican	1816	Incumbent retired. Democratic-Republican hold.	▌ ✓ John Fay (Democratic-Republican) 56.9%; ▌John Veeder (Federalist) 43.1%
New York 15 Plural district with 2 seats	Isaac Williams Jr.	Democratic-Republican	1813 (special); 1814 (retired); 1816	Incumbent retired. Democratic-Republican hold.	▌ ✓ Robert Monell (Democratic-Republican) 26.3%; ▌ ✓ Joseph S. Lyman (Democratic-Republican) 25.8%; ▌Samuel Campbell (Democratic-Republican) 24.3%; ▌Edward Pratt (Democratic-Republican) 23.6%
New York 15 Plural district with 2 seats	John R. Drake	Democratic-Republican	1816	Incumbent retired. Democratic-Republican hold.	▌ ✓ Robert Monell (Democratic-Republican) 26.3%; ▌ ✓ Joseph S. Lyman (Democratic-Republican) 25.8%; ▌Samuel Campbell (Democratic-Republican) 24.3%; ▌Edward Pratt (Democratic-Republican) 23.6%
New York 16	Henry R. Storrs	Federalist	1816	Incumbent re-elected.	▌ ✓ Henry R. Storrs (Federalist) 95.1%; ▌Allen Fraser (Democratic-Republican) 4.9%
New York 17	Thomas H. Hubbard	Democratic-Republican	1816	Incumbent retired. Democratic-Republican hold.	▌ ✓ Aaron Hackley Jr. (Democratic-Republican) 98.8%; ▌Simeon Ford (Clintonian/Federalist) 1.2%
New York 18	David A. Ogden	Federalist	1816	Incumbent retired. Democratic-Republican gain.	▌ ✓ William D. Ford (Democratic-Republican) 74.2%; ▌Horatio Orvis (Clintonian/Federalist) 25.8%
New York 19	James Porter	Democratic-Republican	1816	Incumbent retired. Democratic-Republican hold.	▌ ✓ George Hall (Democratic-Republican) 97.9%; ▌H. O. Wattles (Federalist) 2.1%
New York 20 Plural district with 2 seats	Daniel Cruger	Democratic-Republican	1816	Incumbent retired. Democratic-Republican hold.	▌ ✓ Jonathan Richmond (Democratic-Republican) 50.3%; ▌ ✓ Caleb Baker (Democratic-Republican) 49.7%
New York 20 Plural district with 2 seats	Oliver C. Comstock	Democratic-Republican	1812	Incumbent retired. Democratic-Republican hold.	▌ ✓ Jonathan Richmond (Democratic-Republican) 50.3%; ▌ ✓ Caleb Baker (Democratic-Republican) 49.7%
New York 21 Plural district with 2 seats	Benjamin Ellicott	Democratic-Republican	1816	Incumbent lost re-election. Democratic-Republican hold.	▌ ✓ Nathaniel Allen (Democratic-Republican) 52.4%; ▌ ✓ Albert H. Tracy (Democratic-Republican) 46.8%
New York 21 Plural district with 2 seats	John C. Spencer	Democratic-Republican	1816	Incumbent retired. Democratic-Republican hold.	▌ ✓ Nathaniel Allen (Democratic-Republican) 52.4%; ▌ ✓ Albert H. Tracy (Democratic-Republican) 46.8%

== North Carolina ==
North Carolina elected its members August 12, 1819, after the new congress began but before the first session convened.

District	Incumbent			This race	
District	Member	Party	First elected	Results	Candidates
North Carolina 1	Lemuel Sawyer	Democratic-Republican	1806; 1813 (lost); 1817	Incumbent re-elected.	▌ ✓ Lemuel Sawyer (Democratic-Republican); ▌Voight (Unknown)
North Carolina 2	Joseph H. Bryan	Democratic-Republican	1815	Incumbent retired. Democratic-Republican hold.	▌ ✓ Hutchins G. Burton (Democratic-Republican)
North Carolina 3	Thomas H. Hall	Democratic-Republican	1817	Incumbent re-elected.	▌ ✓ Thomas H. Hall (Democratic-Republican) 78.2%; ▌John Holland (Federalist) 21.8%
North Carolina 4	Jesse Slocumb	Federalist	1817	Incumbent re-elected.	▌ ✓ Jesse Slocumb (Note: The official certificate of vote in the General Assembly Session Records states that Slocumb won by 1,476 votes. No other returns are known to exist for this race.) (Federalist)
North Carolina 5	James Owen	Democratic-Republican	1817	Incumbent retired. Democratic-Republican hold.	▌ ✓ Charles Hooks (Democratic-Republican) 59.0%; ▌Samuel Stanford (Federalist) 41.0%
North Carolina 6	Weldon N. Edwards	Democratic-Republican	1816 (special)	Incumbent re-elected.	▌ ✓ Weldon N. Edwards (Democratic-Republican)
North Carolina 7	James Stewart	Democratic-Republican	1818 (special)	Incumbent lost re-election. Federalist gain.	▌ ✓ John Culpepper (Federalist) 52.0%; ▌James Stewart (Democratic-Republican) 48.0%
North Carolina 8	James S. Smith	Democratic-Republican	1817	Incumbent re-elected.	▌ ✓ James S. Smith (Democratic-Republican) 54.6%; ▌Samuel Dickens (Democratic-Republican) 45.4%
North Carolina 9	Thomas Settle	Democratic-Republican	1817	Incumbent re-elected.	▌ ✓ Thomas Settle (Democratic-Republican) 98.8% (Note: Based on incomplete data.); ▌William Snow (Democratic-Republican) 1.1%
North Carolina 10	Charles Fisher	Democratic-Republican	1819 (special)	Incumbent re-elected.	▌ ✓ Charles Fisher (Democratic-Republican) 65.1%; ▌W. Jones (Federalist) 34.9%
North Carolina 11	William Davidson	Federalist	1818 (special)	Incumbent re-elected.	▌ ✓ William Davidson (Federalist) 45.1%; ▌John F. Brevard (Democratic-Republican) 37.0%; ▌Henry W. Conner (Democratic-Republican) 17.9%
North Carolina 12	Felix Walker	Democratic-Republican	1817	Incumbent re-elected.	▌ ✓ Felix Walker (Democratic-Republican) (Note: The Raleigh Register reported September 3, 1819 that Walker won the race by 587 votes.); ▌Joseph M. D. Carson (Democratic-Republican)
North Carolina 13	Lewis Williams	Democratic-Republican	1815	Incumbent re-elected.	▌ ✓ Lewis Williams (Democratic-Republican)

== Ohio ==
Ohio elected its members October 13, 1818.

District	Incumbent			This race	
District	Member	Party	First elected	Results	Candidates
Ohio 1	William Henry Harrison	Democratic- Republican	1816	Incumbent retired. Democratic-Republican hold.	▌ ✓ Thomas R. Ross (Democratic-Republican) 48.7%; ▌John H. Platt (Unknown) 28.9%; ▌Ethan Stone (Federalist) 22.4%
Ohio 2	John W. Campbell	Democratic- Republican	1816	Incumbent re-elected.	▌ ✓ John W. Campbell (Democratic-Republican) 93.0%; ▌James Burin (Unknown) 7.0%
Ohio 3	Levi Barber	Democratic- Republican	1816	Incumbent lost re-election. Democratic-Republican hold.	▌ ✓ Henry Brush (Democratic-Republican) 41.1%; ▌Levi Barber (Democratic-Republican) 30.3%; ▌Edward Tupper (Unknown) 28.6%
Ohio 4	Samuel Herrick	Democratic- Republican	1816	Incumbent re-elected.	▌ ✓ Samuel Herrick (Democratic-Republican) 52.9%; ▌John C. Wright (Federalist) 46.4%
Ohio 5	Philemon Beecher	Federalist	1816	Incumbent re-elected.	▌ ✓ Philemon Beecher (Federalist) 51.6%; ▌Joseph Vance (Democratic-Republican) 47.7%
Ohio 6	Peter Hitchcock	Democratic- Republican	1816	Incumbent lost re-election. Democratic-Republican hold.	▌ ✓ John Sloane (Democratic-Republican) 51.7%; ▌Peter Hitchcock (Democratic-Republican) 46.2%; ▌Benjamin Martin (Unknown) 2.1%

== Pennsylvania ==
Pennsylvania elected its members October 13, 1818.

District	Incumbent			This race	
District	Member	Party	First elected	Results	Candidates
Pennsylvania 1 Plural district with 4 seats	John Sergeant	Federalist	1815 (special)	Incumbent re-elected.	▌ ✓ John Sergeant (Federalist) 14.2%; ▌ ✓ Joseph Hemphill (Federalist) 14.2%; ▌ ✓ Samuel Edwards (Federalist) 13.8%; ▌ ✓ Thomas Forrest (Federalist) 13.2%; ▌Nicholas Biddle (Democratic-Republican) 11.7%; ▌John Connelly (Democratic-Republican) 10.9%; ▌George G. Leiper (Democratic-Republican) 10.7%; ▌Jacob Somner (Democratic-Republican) 10.7%; ▌Charles Hare (Democratic-Republican) 0.5%
Pennsylvania 1 Plural district with 4 seats	Adam Seybert	Democratic-Republican	1808; 1814 (lost); 1816	Incumbent retired. Federalist gain.	▌ ✓ John Sergeant (Federalist) 14.2%; ▌ ✓ Joseph Hemphill (Federalist) 14.2%; ▌ ✓ Samuel Edwards (Federalist) 13.8%; ▌ ✓ Thomas Forrest (Federalist) 13.2%; ▌Nicholas Biddle (Democratic-Republican) 11.7%; ▌John Connelly (Democratic-Republican) 10.9%; ▌George G. Leiper (Democratic-Republican) 10.7%; ▌Jacob Somner (Democratic-Republican) 10.7%; ▌Charles Hare (Democratic-Republican) 0.5%
Pennsylvania 1 Plural district with 4 seats	William Anderson	Democratic-Republican	1808; 1814 (lost); 1816	Incumbent retired. Federalist gain.	▌ ✓ John Sergeant (Federalist) 14.2%; ▌ ✓ Joseph Hemphill (Federalist) 14.2%; ▌ ✓ Samuel Edwards (Federalist) 13.8%; ▌ ✓ Thomas Forrest (Federalist) 13.2%; ▌Nicholas Biddle (Democratic-Republican) 11.7%; ▌John Connelly (Democratic-Republican) 10.9%; ▌George G. Leiper (Democratic-Republican) 10.7%; ▌Jacob Somner (Democratic-Republican) 10.7%; ▌Charles Hare (Democratic-Republican) 0.5%
Pennsylvania 1 Plural district with 4 seats	Joseph Hopkinson	Federalist	1814	Incumbent retired. Federalist hold.	▌ ✓ John Sergeant (Federalist) 14.2%; ▌ ✓ Joseph Hemphill (Federalist) 14.2%; ▌ ✓ Samuel Edwards (Federalist) 13.8%; ▌ ✓ Thomas Forrest (Federalist) 13.2%; ▌Nicholas Biddle (Democratic-Republican) 11.7%; ▌John Connelly (Democratic-Republican) 10.9%; ▌George G. Leiper (Democratic-Republican) 10.7%; ▌Jacob Somner (Democratic-Republican) 10.7%; ▌Charles Hare (Democratic-Republican) 0.5%
Pennsylvania 2 Plural district with 2 seats	Levi Pawling	Federalist	1816	Incumbent lost re-election. Democratic-Republican gain.	▌ ✓ William Darlington (Democratic-Republican) 27.0%; ▌ ✓ Samuel Gross (Democratic-Republican) 26.5%; ▌Levi Pawling (Federalist) 23.4%; ▌James Kelton (Federalist) 23.1%
Pennsylvania 2 Plural district with 2 seats	Isaac Darlington	Federalist	1816	Incumbent retired. Democratic-Republican gain.	▌ ✓ William Darlington (Democratic-Republican) 27.0%; ▌ ✓ Samuel Gross (Democratic-Republican) 26.5%; ▌Levi Pawling (Federalist) 23.4%; ▌James Kelton (Federalist) 23.1%
Pennsylvania 3 Plural district with 2 seats	James M. Wallace	Democratic-Republican	1815 (special)	Incumbent re-elected.	▌ ✓ Jacob Hibshman (Democratic-Republican) 26.6%; ▌ ✓ James M. Wallace (Democratic-Republican) 26.3%; ▌James Montgomery (Federalist) 23.6%; ▌John Whiteside (Federalist) (Note: Changed parties) 23.4%
Pennsylvania 3 Plural district with 2 seats	John Whiteside	Democratic-Republican	1814	Incumbent lost re-election as a Federalist. Democratic-Republican hold.	▌ ✓ Jacob Hibshman (Democratic-Republican) 26.6%; ▌ ✓ James M. Wallace (Democratic-Republican) 26.3%; ▌James Montgomery (Federalist) 23.6%; ▌John Whiteside (Federalist) 23.4%
Pennsylvania 4	Jacob Spangler	Democratic-Republican	1816	Incumbent resigned April 20, 1818. Democratic-Republican hold. Successor also elected to finish the current term.	▌ ✓ Jacob Hostetter (Democratic-Republican) 100%
Pennsylvania 5 Plural district with 2 seats	Andrew Boden	Democratic-Republican	1816	Incumbent re-elected.	▌ ✓ David Fullerton (Democratic-Republican) 30.3%; ▌ ✓ Andrew Boden (Democratic-Republican) 29.4%; ▌Alexander Cobean (Federalist) 20.6%; ▌John P. Helfenstein (Federalist) 19.8%
Pennsylvania 5 Plural district with 2 seats	William Maclay	Democratic-Republican	1814	Incumbent retired. Democratic-Republican hold.	▌ ✓ David Fullerton (Democratic-Republican) 30.3%; ▌ ✓ Andrew Boden (Democratic-Republican) 29.4%; ▌Alexander Cobean (Federalist) 20.6%; ▌John P. Helfenstein (Federalist) 19.8%
Pennsylvania 6 Plural district with 2 seats	Samuel D. Ingham	Democratic-Republican	1818 (special)	Incumbent resigned July 6, 1818. Democratic-Republican hold. Successor also elected the same day to finish the current term.	▌ ✓ Samuel Moore (Democratic-Republican) 50.6%; ▌ ✓ Thomas J. Rogers (Democratic-Republican) 49.4%
Pennsylvania 6 Plural district with 2 seats	Thomas J. Rogers	Democratic-Republican	1818 (special)	Incumbent re-elected.	▌ ✓ Samuel Moore (Democratic-Republican) 50.6%; ▌ ✓ Thomas J. Rogers (Democratic-Republican) 49.4%
Pennsylvania 7	Joseph Hiester	Democratic-Republican	1798; 1804 (retired); 1814	Incumbent re-elected.	▌ ✓ Joseph Hiester (Democratic-Republican) 65.7%; ▌Jonathan Hudson (Democratic-Republican) 34.3%
Pennsylvania 8	Alexander Ogle	Democratic-Republican	1816	Incumbent retired. Democratic-Republican hold.	▌ ✓ Robert Philson (Democratic-Republican) 59.6%; ▌John A. Bard (Federalist) 40.4%
Pennsylvania 9	William P. Maclay	Democratic-Republican	1816	Incumbent re-elected.	▌ ✓ William P. Maclay (Democratic-Republican) 77.6%; ▌John Brown (Democratic-Republican) 22.4%
Pennsylvania 10 Plural district with 2 seats	William Wilson	Democratic-Republican	1814	Incumbent retired. Democratic-Republican hold.	▌ ✓ John Murray (Democratic-Republican) 50.4%; ▌ ✓ George Denison (Democratic-Republican) 49.6%
Pennsylvania 10 Plural district with 2 seats	John Murray	Democratic-Republican	1817 (special)	Incumbent re-elected.	▌ ✓ John Murray (Democratic-Republican) 50.4%; ▌ ✓ George Denison (Democratic-Republican) 49.6%
Pennsylvania 11	David Marchand	Democratic-Republican	1816	Incumbent re-elected.	▌ ✓ David Marchand (Democratic-Republican) 52.6%; ▌James Kelly (Federalist) 47.4%
Pennsylvania 12	Thomas Patterson	Democratic-Republican	1816	Incumbent re-elected.	▌ ✓ Thomas Patterson (Democratic-Republican) 64.2%; ▌Joseph Pentecost (Federalist) 35.8%
Pennsylvania 13	Christian Tarr	Democratic-Republican	1816	Incumbent re-elected.	▌ ✓ Christian Tarr (Democratic-Republican) 78.7%; ▌Henry Heaton (Democratic-Republican) 21.3%
Pennsylvania 14	Henry Baldwin	Democratic-Republican	1816	Incumbent re-elected.	▌ ✓ Henry Baldwin (Democratic-Republican) 55.1%; ▌Samuel Douglas (Democratic-Republican) 44.9%
Pennsylvania 15	Robert Moore	Democratic-Republican	1816	Incumbent re-elected.	▌ ✓ Robert Moore (Democratic-Republican) 53.3%; ▌Thomas Wilson (Democratic-Republican) 46.7%

== Rhode Island ==
Rhode Island elected its members August 25, 1818.

District	Incumbent			This race	
District	Member	Party	First elected	Results	Candidates
Rhode Island at-large 2 seats on a general ticket	John L. Boss Jr.	Federalist	1814	Incumbent retired. Democratic-Republican gain.	▌ ✓ Samuel Eddy (Democratic-Republican) 50.3%; ▌ ✓ Nathaniel Hazard (Democratic-Republican) 49.4%; Others 0.3%
Rhode Island at-large 2 seats on a general ticket	James B. Mason	Federalist	1814	Incumbent retired. Democratic-Republican gain.	▌ ✓ Samuel Eddy (Democratic-Republican) 50.3%; ▌ ✓ Nathaniel Hazard (Democratic-Republican) 49.4%; Others 0.3%

== South Carolina ==
South Carolina elected its members October 12–13, 1818.

District	Incumbent			This race	
District	Member	Party	First elected	Results	Candidates
South Carolina 1	Henry Middleton	Democratic-Republican	1814	Incumbent retired. Democratic-Republican hold.	▌ ✓ Charles Pinckney (Democratic-Republican) 49.0%; ▌Daniel Elliott Huger (Democratic-Republican) 34.1%; ▌William Crafts Jr. (Federalist) 16.9%
South Carolina 2	William Lowndes	Democratic-Republican	1810	Incumbent re-elected.	▌ ✓ William Lowndes (Democratic-Republican) 100%
South Carolina 3	James Ervin	Democratic-Republican	1816	Incumbent re-elected.	▌ ✓ James Ervin (Democratic-Republican) 100%
South Carolina 4	Joseph Bellinger	Democratic-Republican	1816	Incumbent retired. Democratic-Republican hold.	▌ ✓ James Overstreet (Democratic-Republican) 41.0%; ▌John J. Chappell (Democratic-Republican) 35.2%; ▌John M. Felder (Federalist) 23.8%
South Carolina 5	Starling Tucker	Democratic-Republican	1816	Incumbent re-elected.	▌ ✓ Starling Tucker (Democratic-Republican) 50.8%; ▌William Brown (Democratic-Republican) 28.5%; ▌Philip E. Pearson (Democratic-Republican) 20.7%
South Carolina 6	Eldred Simkins	Democratic-Republican	1818 (special)	Incumbent re-elected.	▌ ✓ Eldred Simkins (Democratic-Republican) 54.1%; ▌Joseph Black (Democratic-Republican) 25.9%; ▌William Butler (Democratic-Republican) 19.9%
South Carolina 7	Elias Earle	Democratic-Republican	1804; 1814 (lost); 1816	Incumbent re-elected.	▌ ✓ Elias Earle (Democratic-Republican) 53.7%; ▌John H. Harrison (Democratic-Republican) 46.3%
South Carolina 8	Wilson Nesbitt	Democratic-Republican	1816	Incumbent retired. Democratic-Republican hold.	▌ ✓ John McCreary (Democratic-Republican) 100%
South Carolina 9	Stephen D. Miller	Democratic-Republican	1816	Incumbent retired. Democratic-Republican hold.	▌ ✓ Joseph Brevard (Democratic-Republican) 91.9%; ▌James C. Postell (Federalist) 8.1%

== Tennessee ==
Tennessee elected its members August 5–6, 1819, after the new congress began but before the first session convened.

District	Incumbent			This race	
District	Member	Party	First elected	Results	Candidates
Tennessee 1	John Rhea	Democratic- Republican	1803; 1815 (lost); 1817	Incumbent re-elected.	▌ ✓ John Rhea (Democratic-Republican) 46.4%; ▌John Tipton (Unknown) 42.3%; ▌John Kennedy (Unknown) 11.3%
Tennessee 2	William G. Blount	Democratic- Republican	1815 (special)	Incumbent retired. Democratic-Republican hold.	▌ ✓ John Cocke (Democratic-Republican) 52.5%; ▌James P. H. Porter (Unknown) 47.5%
Tennessee 3	Francis Jones	Democratic- Republican	1817	Incumbent re-elected.	▌ ✓ Francis Jones (Democratic-Republican) 61.6%; ▌John Brown (Unknown) 38.4%
Tennessee 4	Samuel E. Hogg	Democratic- Republican	1817	Incumbent retired. Democratic-Republican hold.	▌ ✓ Robert Allen (Democratic-Republican) 61.3%; ▌William Hadley (Unknown) 38.7%
Tennessee 5	Thomas Claiborne	Democratic- Republican	1817	Incumbent retired. Democratic-Republican hold.	▌ ✓ Newton Cannon (Democratic-Republican) 57.5%; ▌Jarvis Trimble (Unknown) 42.5%
Tennessee 6	George W. L. Marr	Democratic- Republican	1817	Incumbent retired. Democratic-Republican hold.	▌ ✓ Henry H. Bryan (Democratic-Republican) 45.7%; ▌Robert Mark (Unknown) 38.2%; ▌James B. Reynolds (Democratic-Republican) 16.1%

== Vermont ==
Vermont elected its members September 1, 1818.

District	Incumbent			This race	
District	Member	Party	First elected	Results	Candidates
Vermont at-large 6 seats on a general ticket	Charles Rich	Democratic-Republican	1812; 1814 (lost); 1816	Incumbent re-elected.	▌ ✓ Charles Rich (Democratic-Republican) 12.5%; ▌ ✓ Mark Richards (Democratic-Republican) 12.4%; ▌ ✓ William Strong (Democratic-Republican) 12.1%; ▌ ✓ Samuel C. Crafts (Democratic-Republican) 10.1%; ▌ ✓ Ezra Meech (Democratic-Republican) 9.4%; ▌ ✓ Orsamus Cook Merrill (Democratic-Republican) 6.4% (Note: Initial returns showed Rollin C. Mallary in 8th place with 6,879 votes and Orsamus Cook Merrill in 6th place with 6,955 votes, but after challenging the results, the House Committee on Elections declared Mallary the winner of the last seat with 6,961 votes, a 6-vote lead over Merrill. Mallary was seated January 13, 1820.); ▌William A. Griswold (Democratic-Republican) 6.3%; ▌Rollin C. Mallary (Democratic-Republican) 6.3%; ▌John Peck (Democratic-Republican) 6.0%; ▌David Edmond (Federalist) 4.3%; ▌Horace Everett (Democratic-Republican) 4.3%; ▌Phineas White (Democratic-Republican) 4.2%; ▌Richard Skinner (Democratic-Republican) 3.3%
Vermont at-large 6 seats on a general ticket	Mark Richards	Democratic-Republican	1816	Incumbent re-elected.	
Vermont at-large 6 seats on a general ticket	Samuel C. Crafts	Democratic-Republican	1816	Incumbent re-elected.	
Vermont at-large 6 seats on a general ticket	Heman Allen (of Colchester)	Democratic-Republican	1816	Incumbent resigned April 20, 1818 to become a U.S. Marshall. Democratic-Republican hold.	
Vermont at-large 6 seats on a general ticket	William Hunter	Democratic-Republican	1816	Incumbent lost re-election. Democratic-Republican hold.	
Vermont at-large 6 seats on a general ticket	Orsamus Cook Merrill	Democratic-Republican	1816	Incumbent re-elected. Election later contested successfully by Rollin C. Mallary.	

== Virginia ==
Virginia elected its members in April 1819, after the new congress began but before the first session convened.

District	Incumbent			This race	
District	Member	Party	First elected	Results	Candidates
Virginia 1	James Pindall	Federalist	1817	Incumbent re-elected.	▌ ✓ James Pindall (Federalist) 77.2%; ▌William McKinley (Democratic-Republican) 22.8%
Virginia 2	Edward Colston	Federalist	1817	Incumbent lost re-election. Federalist hold.	▌ ✓ Thomas Van Swearingen (Federalist) 55.7%; ▌Edward Colston (Federalist) 44.3%
Virginia 3	Henry St. George Tucker	Democratic-Republican	1815	Incumbent retired. Democratic-Republican hold.	▌ ✓ Jared Williams (Democratic-Republican) 64.6%; ▌John Smith (Democratic-Republican) 35.4%
Virginia 4	William McCoy	Democratic-Republican	1811	Incumbent re-elected.	▌ ✓ William McCoy (Democratic-Republican) 100%
Virginia 5	John Floyd	Democratic-Republican	1817	Incumbent re-elected.	▌ ✓ John Floyd (Democratic-Republican) 100%
Virginia 6	Alexander Smyth	Democratic-Republican	1817	Incumbent re-elected.	▌ ✓ Alexander Smyth (Democratic-Republican) 100%
Virginia 7	Ballard Smith	Democratic-Republican	1815	Incumbent re-elected.	▌ ✓ Ballard Smith (Democratic-Republican) 100%
Virginia 8	Charles F. Mercer	Federalist	1817	Incumbent re-elected.	▌ ✓ Charles F. Mercer (Federalist) 100%
Virginia 9	William Lee Ball	Democratic-Republican	1817	Incumbent re-elected.	▌ ✓ William Lee Ball (Democratic-Republican) 53.4%; ▌John Hungerford (Democratic-Republican) 46.6%
Virginia 10	George Strother	Democratic-Republican	1817	Incumbent re-elected.	▌ ✓ George Strother (Democratic-Republican) 51.4%; ▌John Shackleford (Federalist) 47.8%
Virginia 11	Philip P. Barbour	Democratic-Republican	1814 (special)	Incumbent re-elected.	▌ ✓ Philip P. Barbour (Democratic-Republican) 100%
Virginia 12	Robert S. Garnett	Democratic-Republican	1817	Incumbent re-elected.	▌ ✓ Robert S. Garnett (Democratic-Republican) 100%
Virginia 13	Burwell Bassett	Democratic-Republican	1805; 1812 (lost); 1815	Incumbent retired. Democratic-Republican hold.	▌ ✓ Severn E. Parker (Democratic-Republican); ▌John Drury (Unknown)
Virginia 14	William A. Burwell	Democratic-Republican	1806 (special)	Incumbent re-elected.	▌ ✓ William A. Burwell (Democratic-Republican) 100%
Virginia 15	William J. Lewis	Democratic-Republican	1817	Incumbent retired. Democratic-Republican hold.	▌ ✓ George Tucker (Democratic-Republican) 72.2%; ▌John Kerr (Democratic-Republican) 27.8%
Virginia 16	Archibald Austin	Democratic-Republican	1817	Incumbent lost re-election. Democratic-Republican hold.	▌ ✓ John Randolph (Democratic-Republican) 72.9%; ▌Archibald Austin (Democratic-Republican) 27.1%
Virginia 17	James Pleasants	Democratic-Republican	1811	Incumbent re-elected.	▌ ✓ James Pleasants (Democratic-Republican)
Virginia 18	Thomas M. Nelson	Democratic-Republican	1816 (special)	Incumbent retired. Democratic-Republican hold.	▌ ✓ Mark Alexander (Democratic-Republican) 54.7%; ▌Theo Field (Democratic-Republican) 25.9%; ▌James Wyche (Democratic-Republican) 17.8%
Virginia 19	John Pegram	Democratic-Republican	1818 (special)	Incumbent lost re-election. Democratic-Republican hold.	▌ ✓ James Jones (Democratic-Republican); ▌John Pegram (Democratic-Republican)
Virginia 20	James Johnson	Democratic-Republican	1813	Incumbent re-elected.	▌ ✓ James Johnson (Democratic-Republican) 100%
Virginia 21	Thomas Newton Jr.	Democratic-Republican	1797	Incumbent re-elected.	▌ ✓ Thomas Newton Jr. (Democratic-Republican) 100%
Virginia 22	Hugh Nelson	Democratic-Republican	1811	Incumbent re-elected.	▌ ✓ Hugh Nelson (Democratic-Republican) 100%
Virginia 23	John Tyler	Democratic-Republican	1816 (special)	Incumbent re-elected.	▌ ✓ John Tyler (Democratic-Republican) 100%

== Non-voting delegates ==
There were four territories with the right to send non-voting delegates to at least part of the 16th Congress, two of which, Michigan Territory and Arkansas Territory were new to this Congress.

District	Incumbent			This race	
District	Member	Party	First elected	Results	Candidates
Alabama Territory at-large	None (new territory)			New seat. New member elected January 29, 1818 and seated March 9, 1818. Member later elected to the new state; see above.	▌ ✓ John Crowell (Democratic-Republican); [data missing]
Arkansas Territory at-large	None (new territory)			Arkansas Territory organized July 4, 1819. New delegate elected in 1819. New delegate seated December 21, 1819.	✓ James Woodson Bates 32.1%; Stephen F. Austin 26.2%; Alexander S. Walker 18.1%; Henry Cassidy 12.2%; Robert F. Slaughter 11.1%; Perly Wallis 0.3%
Michigan Territory at-large	None (new territory)			New seat. New delegate elected October 28, 1819 and seated March 2, 1820.	▌ ✓ William Woodbridge (Democratic-Republican)
Missouri Territory at-large	John Scott	Democratic- Republican	1816; 1817 (vacated); 1817 (special)	Incumbent re-elected.	▌ ✓ John Scott (Democratic-Republican) 62.2%; ▌Samuel Hammond (Democratic-Republican) 37.7%

== See also ==
- 1818 United States elections
  - List of United States House of Representatives elections (1789–1822)
  - 1818–19 United States Senate elections
- 15th United States Congress
- 16th United States Congress

== Bibliography ==
- "A New Nation Votes: American Election Returns 1787–1825". Tufts Digital Library, Tufts University.
- Dubin, Michael J. (March 1, 1998). 1788–1997 United States Congressional Elections: The Official Results of the Elections of the 1st Through 105th Congresses. McFarland and Company. ISBN 978-0786402830.
- Martis, Kenneth C. (January 1, 1989). The Historical Atlas of Political Parties in the United States Congress, 1789–1989. Macmillan Publishing Company. ISBN 978-0029201701.
- "Party Divisions of the House of Representatives* 1789–present". Office of the Historian, United States House of Representatives.
- "Fifteenth Congress March 4, 1817, to March 3, 1819". Office of the Historian, United States House of Representatives. Archived from the original on November 5, 2018 – via History.house.gov.
- "Sixteenth Congress March 4, 1819, to March 3, 1821". Office of the Historian, United States House of Representatives. Archived from the original on December 23, 2018 – via History.house.gov.
- Mapping Early American Elections project team (2019). "Mapping Early American Elections". Roy Rosenzweig Center for History and New Media, George Mason University.
