= 1818 North Carolina's 7th congressional district special election =

On January 1, 1818, a special election was held in North Carolina's 7th district to fill a vacancy left by the death of Representative-elect Alexander McMillan (F) before the 15th Congress had assembled.

== Election results ==
Candidate	Party	Votes	Percent
James Stewart	Federalist	1,719	40.6%
John Culpepper	Federalist	1,562	36.9%
Atlas Jones	Federalist	767	18.1%
James Gaines		137	3.2%
Joseph Winslow	Federalist	53	1.3%

Stewart took his seat on January 26

== See also ==
- List of special elections to the United States House of Representatives
- 1818 and 1819 United States House of Representatives elections
- List of United States representatives from North Carolina
