= North Carolina's 7th congressional district =

U.S. House district for North Carolina

Coordinates: 34.44°N 78.48°W

- Interactive map of district boundaries since January 3, 2025 (Note: As the mid-decade redistricting bill (S249) enacted on October 22, 2025 only changed the compositions of North Carolina's 1st and 3rd congressional districts, boundaries of other districts will not change at the 2026 elections.)
- Representative: David Rouzer; R–Wilmington
- Population (2025): 826,016
- Median household income: $76,896
- Ethnicity: 64.2% White; 19.1% Black; 8.3% Hispanic; 4.4% Two or more races; 2.2% Native American; 1.3% Asian; 0.5% other
- Cook PVI: R+7

North Carolina's 7th congressional district stretches from Wilmington and the South Carolina border to parts of Fayetteville.

The district is represented by David Rouzer, a Republican. He has been in office since 2015.

From 2003 to 2013, it covered Bladen, Brunswick, Columbus, Cumberland, Duplin, New Hanover, Pender, Robeson, and Sampson counties.

On February 23, 2022, the North Carolina Supreme Court approved a new map which changed the 7th district boundaries to remove Duplin and Sampson counties and add part of Cumberland County.

== Counties ==
For the 119th and successive Congresses (based on the districts drawn following a 2023 legislative session), the district contains all or portions of the following counties and communities.

Bladen County (10)

All ten communities

Brunswick County (19)

All 19 communities

Columbus County (14)

All 14 communities

Cumberland County (9)

Eastover, Falcon (shared with Sampson County), Fayetteville (part; also 9th), Godwin, Hope Mills, Linden, Stedman, Vander, Wade

New Hanover County (18)

All 18 communities

Pender County (10)

All 10 communities

Robeson County (10)

Barker Ten Mile (part; also 8th), Lumber Bridge, Lumberton (part; also 8th), Orrum, Parkton, Proctorville, Rennert, Rex, St. Pauls, Shannon

Sampson County (3)

Falcon (shared with Cumberland County), Plain View, Spivey's Corner (part; also 3rd)

== Recent election results from statewide races ==
Year	Office	Results
2008	President	McCain 52% - 47%
2008	Senate	Hagan 53% - 44%
2008	Governor	Perdue 53% - 44%
2010	Senate	Burr 57% - 41%
2012	President	Romney 54% - 46%
2012	Governor	McCrory 55% - 42%
2014	Senate	Tillis 50% - 45%
2016	President	Trump 54% - 42%
2016	Senate	Burr 55% - 41%
2016	Governor	McCrory 53% - 45%
2016	Lt. Governor	Forest 55% - 42%
2016	Secretary of State	LaPaglia 51% - 49%
2016	Auditor	Stuber 53% - 47%
2016	Treasurer	Folwell 56% - 44%
2016	Attorney General	Newton 53% - 47%
2020	President	Trump 55% - 44%
2020	Senate	Tillis 53% - 42%
2020	Governor	Forest 51% - 47%
2020	Lt. Governor	Robinson 56% - 44%
2020	Secretary of State	Sykes 53% - 47%
2020	Auditor	Street 54% - 46%
2020	Treasurer	Folwell 57% - 43%
2020	Attorney General	O'Neill 54% - 46%
2022	Senate	Budd 55% - 42%
2024	President	Trump 56% - 42%
2024	Governor	Stein 51% - 43%
2024	Lt. Governor	Weatherman 52% - 45%
2024	Secretary of State	Brown 54% - 46%
2024	Auditor	Boliek 55% - 42%
2024	Treasurer	Briner 58% - 42%
2024	Attorney General	Bishop 54% - 46%

== List of members representing the district ==
Member (Residence)	Party	Years	Cong ress	Electoral history	District location
District established March 4, 1793
William B. Grove (Fayetteville)	Pro-Administration	March 4, 1793 – March 3, 1795	3rd 4th 5th 6th 7th	Redistricted from the 5th district and re-elected in 1793. Re-elected in 1795. Re-elected in 1796. Re-elected in 1798. Re-elected in 1800. Retired.	
William B. Grove (Fayetteville)	Federalist	March 4, 1795 – March 3, 1803	3rd 4th 5th 6th 7th	Redistricted from the 5th district and re-elected in 1793. Re-elected in 1795. Re-elected in 1796. Re-elected in 1798. Re-elected in 1800. Retired.	
Samuel D. Purviance (Fayetteville)	Federalist	March 4, 1803 – March 3, 1805	8th	Elected in 1803. Retired.	1803–1813 "North Carolina Congressional District Map (1803–13)".
Duncan McFarlan (Laurel Hill)	Democratic-Republican	March 4, 1805 – March 3, 1807	9th	Elected in 1804. Lost re-election.	1803–1813 "North Carolina Congressional District Map (1803–13)".
John Culpepper (Allenton)	Federalist	March 4, 1807 – January 2, 1808	10th	Elected in 1806. Seat declared vacant when election contested.	1803–1813 "North Carolina Congressional District Map (1803–13)".
Vacant		January 2, 1808 – February 23, 1808	10th		1803–1813 "North Carolina Congressional District Map (1803–13)".
John Culpepper (Allenton)	Federalist	February 23, 1808 – March 3, 1809	10th	Elected to finish his vacant term. Lost re-election.	1803–1813 "North Carolina Congressional District Map (1803–13)".
Archibald McBryde (Carthage)	Federalist	March 4, 1809 – March 3, 1813	11th 12th	Elected in 1808. Re-elected in 1810. Retired.	1803–1813 "North Carolina Congressional District Map (1803–13)".
Archibald McBryde (Carthage)	Federalist	March 4, 1809 – March 3, 1813	11th 12th	Elected in 1808. Re-elected in 1810. Retired.	1813–1823 "North Carolina congressional district map (1813–43)".
John Culpepper (Allenton)	Federalist	March 4, 1813 – March 3, 1817	13th 14th	Elected in 1813. Re-elected in 1815. Lost re-election.	1813–1823 "North Carolina congressional district map (1813–43)".
Vacant		March 3, 1817 – January 5, 1818	15th	Alexander McMillan was Elected in 1817 but died sometime in 1817.	1813–1823 "North Carolina congressional district map (1813–43)".
James Stewart (Laurinburg)	Federalist	January 5, 1818 – March 3, 1819	15th	Elected January 1, 1818 to finish McMillan's term and seated January 26, 1818. Retired.	1813–1823 "North Carolina congressional district map (1813–43)".
John Culpepper (Wadesboro)	Federalist	March 4, 1819 – March 3, 1821	16th	Elected in 1819. Lost re-election.	1813–1823 "North Carolina congressional district map (1813–43)".
Archibald McNeill (McNeill's Store)	Federalist	March 4, 1821 – March 3, 1823	17th	Elected in 1821. Retired.	1813–1823 "North Carolina congressional district map (1813–43)".
John Culpepper (Lawrenceville)	Adams-Clay Federalist	March 4, 1823 – March 3, 1825	18th	Elected in 1823. Lost re-election.	1823–1843 "North Carolina congressional district map (1813–43)".
Archibald McNeill (McNeill's Store)	Jacksonian	March 4, 1825 – March 3, 1827	19th	Elected in 1825. Retired.	1823–1843 "North Carolina congressional district map (1813–43)".
John Culpepper (Beard's Store)	Anti-Jacksonian	March 4, 1827 – March 3, 1829	20th	Elected in 1827. Lost re-election.	1823–1843 "North Carolina congressional district map (1813–43)".
Edmund Deberry (Lawrenceville)	Anti-Jacksonian	March 4, 1829 – March 3, 1831	21st	Elected in 1829. [data missing]	1823–1843 "North Carolina congressional district map (1813–43)".
Lauchlin Bethune (Fayetteville)	Jacksonian	March 4, 1831 – March 3, 1833	22nd	Elected in 1831. [data missing]	1823–1843 "North Carolina congressional district map (1813–43)".
Edmund Deberry (Lawrenceville)	Anti-Jacksonian	March 4, 1833 – March 3, 1837	23rd 24th 25th 26th 27th	Re-elected in 1833. Re-elected in 1835. Re-elected in 1837. Re-elected in 1839. Re-elected in 1841. Redistricted to the 4th district.	1823–1843 "North Carolina congressional district map (1813–43)".
Edmund Deberry (Lawrenceville)	Whig	March 4, 1837 – March 3, 1843	23rd 24th 25th 26th 27th	Re-elected in 1833. Re-elected in 1835. Re-elected in 1837. Re-elected in 1839. Re-elected in 1841. Redistricted to the 4th district.	1823–1843 "North Carolina congressional district map (1813–43)".
John Daniel (Halifax)	Democratic	March 4, 1843 – March 3, 1847	28th 29th	Redistricted from the 2nd district and re-elected in 1843. Re-elected in 1845. Redistricted to the 6th district.	
James I. McKay (Elizabethtown)	Democratic	March 4, 1847 – March 3, 1849	30th	Redistricted from the 6th district and re-elected in 1847. [data missing]	
William S. Ashe (Wilmington)	Democratic	March 4, 1849 – March 3, 1853	31st 32nd	Elected in 1849. Re-elected in 1851. Redistricted to the 3rd district.	
F. Burton Craige (Salisbury)	Democratic	March 4, 1853 – March 3, 1861	33rd 34th 35th 36th	Elected in 1853. Re-elected in 1855. Re-elected in 1857. Re-elected in 1859. [data missing]	
Vacant		March 4, 1861 – July 6, 1868	37th 38th 39th 40th	Civil War and Reconstruction	
Alexander H. Jones (Asheville)	Republican	July 6, 1868 – March 3, 1871	40th 41st	Elected to finish the short term. Re-elected in 1868. [data missing]	
James C. Harper (Patterson)	Democratic	March 4, 1871 – March 3, 1873	42nd	Elected in 1870. [data missing]	
William M. Robbins (Statesville)	Democratic	March 4, 1873 – March 3, 1879	43rd 44th 45th	Elected in 1872. Re-elected in 1874. Re-elected in 1876. [data missing]	
Robert F. Armfield (Statesville)	Democratic	March 4, 1879 – March 3, 1883	46th 47th	Elected in 1878. Re-elected in 1880. [data missing]	
Tyre York (Trap Hill)	Independent Democratic	March 4, 1883 – March 3, 1885	48th	Elected in 1882. [data missing]	
John S. Henderson (Salisbury)	Democratic	March 4, 1885 – March 3, 1895	49th 50th 51st 52nd 53rd	Elected in 1884. Re-elected in 1886. Re-elected in 1888. Re-elected in 1890. Re-elected in 1892. [data missing]	
Alonzo C. Shuford (Newton)	Populist	March 4, 1895 – March 3, 1899	54th 55th	Elected in 1894. Re-elected in 1896. [data missing]	
Theodore F. Kluttz (Salisbury)	Democratic	March 4, 1899 – March 3, 1903	56th 57th	Elected in 1898. Re-elected in 1900. Redistricted to the 8th district.	
Robert N. Page (Biscoe)	Democratic	March 4, 1903 – March 3, 1917	58th 59th 60th 61st 62nd 63rd 64th	Elected in 1902. Re-elected in 1904. Re-elected in 1906. Re-elected in 1908. Re-elected in 1910. Re-elected in 1912. Re-elected in 1914. [data missing]	
Leonidas D. Robinson (Wadesboro)	Democratic	March 4, 1917 – March 3, 1921	65th 66th	Elected in 1916. Re-elected in 1918. [data missing]	
William C. Hammer (Asheboro)	Democratic	March 4, 1921 – September 26, 1930	67th 68th 69th 70th 71st	Elected in 1920. Re-elected in 1922. Re-elected in 1924. Re-elected in 1926. Re-elected in 1928. Died.	
Vacant		September 26, 1930 – November 4, 1930	71st		
Hinton James (Laurinburg)	Democratic	November 4, 1930 – March 3, 1931	71st	Elected to finish Hammer's term. Retired.	
Walter Lambeth (Thomasville)	Democratic	March 4, 1931 – March 3, 1933	72nd	Elected in 1930. Redistricted to the 8th district.	
J. Bayard Clark (Fayetteville)	Democratic	March 4, 1933 – January 3, 1949	73rd 74th 75th 76th 77th 78th 79th 80th	Redistricted from the 6th district and re-elected in 1932. Re-elected in 1934. Re-elected in 1936. Re-elected in 1938. Re-elected in 1940. Re-elected in 1942. Re-elected in 1944. Re-elected in 1946. Retired.	
Frank E. Carlyle (Lumberton)	Democratic	January 3, 1949 – January 3, 1957	81st 82nd 83rd 84th	Elected in 1948. Re-elected in 1950. Re-elected in 1952. Re-elected in 1954. Lost renomination.	
Alton A. Lennon (Wilmington)	Democratic	January 3, 1957 – January 3, 1973	85th 86th 87th 88th 89th 90th 91st 92nd	Elected in 1956. Re-elected in 1958. Re-elected in 1960. Re-elected in 1962. Re-elected in 1964. Re-elected in 1966. Re-elected in 1968. Re-elected in 1970. Retired.	
Charlie Rose (Fayetteville)	Democratic	January 3, 1973 – January 3, 1997	93rd 94th 95th 96th 97th 98th 99th 100th 101st 102nd 103rd 104th	Elected in 1972. Re-elected in 1974. Re-elected in 1976. Re-elected in 1978. Re-elected in 1980. Re-elected in 1982. Re-elected in 1984. Re-elected in 1986. Re-elected in 1988. Re-elected in 1990. Re-elected in 1992. Re-elected in 1994. Retired.	
Mike McIntyre (Lumberton)	Democratic	January 3, 1997 – January 3, 2015	105th 106th 107th 108th 109th 110th 111th 112th 113th	Elected in 1996. Re-elected in 1998. Re-elected in 2000. Re-elected in 2002. Re-elected in 2004. Re-elected in 2006. Re-elected in 2008. Re-elected in 2010. Re-elected in 2012. Retired.	2003–2013 2003 - 2013
David Rouzer (Wilmington)	Republican	January 3, 2015 – present	114th 115th 116th 117th 118th 119th	Elected in 2014. Re-elected in 2016. Re-elected in 2018. Re-elected in 2020. Re-elected in 2022. Re-elected in 2024. Re-elected in 2026.	2013–2017 2013–2017
David Rouzer (Wilmington)	Republican	January 3, 2015 – present	114th 115th 116th 117th 118th 119th	Elected in 2014. Re-elected in 2016. Re-elected in 2018. Re-elected in 2020. Re-elected in 2022. Re-elected in 2024. Re-elected in 2026.	2017–2021
David Rouzer (Wilmington)	Republican	January 3, 2015 – present	114th 115th 116th 117th 118th 119th	Elected in 2014. Re-elected in 2016. Re-elected in 2018. Re-elected in 2020. Re-elected in 2022. Re-elected in 2024. Re-elected in 2026.	2021–2023 Static map of 2021-3 congressional district
David Rouzer (Wilmington)	Republican	January 3, 2015 – present	114th 115th 116th 117th 118th 119th	Elected in 2014. Re-elected in 2016. Re-elected in 2018. Re-elected in 2020. Re-elected in 2022. Re-elected in 2024. Re-elected in 2026.	2023–2025
David Rouzer (Wilmington)	Republican	January 3, 2015 – present	114th 115th 116th 117th 118th 119th	Elected in 2014. Re-elected in 2016. Re-elected in 2018. Re-elected in 2020. Re-elected in 2022. Re-elected in 2024. Re-elected in 2026.	2025–present

== Past election results ==
=== 2000 ===
2000 North Carolina's 7th congressional district election
Party	Candidate	Votes	%
Democratic	Mike McIntyre (incumbent)	160,185	69.75
Republican	James R. Adams	66,463	28.94
Libertarian	Bob Burns	3,018	1.31
Total votes		229,666	100.00
Democratic hold			

=== 2002 ===
2002 North Carolina's 7th congressional district election
Party	Candidate	Votes	%
Democratic	Mike McIntyre (incumbent)	118,543	71.13
Republican	James R. Adams	45,537	27.32
Libertarian	David Michael Brooks	2,574	1.54
Total votes		166,654	100.00
Democratic hold			

=== 2004 ===
2004 North Carolina's 7th congressional district election
Party	Candidate	Votes	%
Democratic	Mike McIntyre (incumbent)	180,382	73.19
Republican	Ken Plonk	66,084	26.81
Total votes		246,466	100.00
Democratic hold			

=== 2006 ===
2006 North Carolina's 7th congressional district election
Party	Candidate	Votes	%
Democratic	Mike McIntyre (incumbent)	101,787	72.80
Republican	Shirley Davis	38,033	27.20
Total votes		139,820	100.00
Democratic hold			

=== 2008 ===
2008 North Carolina's 7th congressional district election
Party	Candidate	Votes	%
Democratic	Mike McIntyre (incumbent)	215,383	68.84
Republican	Will Breazeale	97,472	31.16
Total votes		312,885	100.00
Democratic hold			

=== 2010 ===
2010 North Carolina's 7th congressional district election
Party	Candidate	Votes	%
Democratic	Mike McIntyre (incumbent)	113,957	53.68
Republican	Ilario Gregory Pantano	98,328	46.32
Total votes		212,285	100.00
Democratic hold			

=== 2012 ===
2012 North Carolina's 7th congressional district election
Party	Candidate	Votes	%
Democratic	Mike McIntyre (incumbent)	168,695	50.10
Republican	David Rouzer	168,041	49.90
Total votes		336,736	100.00
Democratic hold			

=== 2014 ===
2014 North Carolina's 7th congressional district election
Party	Candidate	Votes	%
Republican	David Rouzer	134,431	59.35
Democratic	Jonathan Barfield Jr.	84,054	37.11
Libertarian	J. Wesley Casteen	7,850	3.47
N/A	Miscellaneous	163	0.07
N/A	Louis Harmati	6	0
Total votes		226,504	100.00
Republican gain from Democratic			

=== 2016 ===
2016 North Carolina's 7th congressional district election
Party	Candidate	Votes	%
Republican	David Rouzer (incumbent)	211,801	60.91
Democratic	J. Wesley Casteen	135,905	39.09
Total votes		347,706	100.00
Republican hold			

=== 2018 ===
2018 North Carolina's 7th congressional district election
Party	Candidate	Votes	%
Republican	David Rouzer (incumbent)	156,809	55.54
Democratic	Kyle Horton	120,838	42.80
Constitution	David W. Fallin	4,655	1.65
Total votes		282,312	100.00
Republican hold			

=== 2020 ===
2020 North Carolina's 7th congressional district election
Party	Candidate	Votes	%
Republican	David Rouzer (incumbent)	272,443	60.2
Democratic	Chris Ward	179,045	39.6
Write-in		720	0.2
Total votes		452,208	100.0
Republican hold			

=== 2022 ===
2022 North Carolina's 7th congressional district election
Party	Candidate	Votes	%
Republican	David Rouzer (incumbent)	164,047	57.71
Democratic	Charles Graham	120,222	42.29
Total votes		284,269	100.00
Republican hold			

=== 2024 ===
2024 North Carolina's 7th congressional district election
Party	Candidate	Votes	%
Republican	David Rouzer (incumbent)	254,022	58.6
Democratic	Marlando Pridgen	179,512	41.4
Total votes		433,534	100.0
Republican hold			

== In popular culture ==
In the 2012 film The Campaign, Will Ferrell's character Camden Brady holds the fictional seat of the 14th congressional district. However, the district is based on the 7th district.

== See also ==
- List of United States congressional districts
- North Carolina's congressional districts
