= 1818 Connecticut's at-large congressional district special election =

In 1818, Uriel Holmes (F) of Connecticut's at-large district resigned from the House. A special election was held to fill the resulting vacancy.

== Election results ==
Candidate	Party	Votes	Percent
Sylvester Gilbert	Democratic-Republican	4,561	48.6%
Lyman Law	Federalist	2,232	23.8%
Asa Bacon, Jr.	Federalist	1,429	15.2%
Epaphroditus Champion	Federalist	661	7.0%
Lewis B. Sturges	Federalist	172	1.8%
Charles Dennison	Federalist	141	1.5%
Nathan Smith	Federalist	103	1.1%

Gilbert took his seat November 16, 1818 at the start of the Second Session.

== See also ==
- List of special elections to the United States House of Representatives
