= 1818 Pennsylvania's 6th congressional district special elections =

During the 15th Congress, there were two special elections in the 6th district of Pennsylvania, both held in the year 1818. The 6th district at that time was a plural district with two seats, both of which became vacant at different times in 1818. The first vacancy was caused by John Ross (DR) resigning on February 24, 1818 and the second was caused by Samuel D. Ingham (DR) resigning July 6.

== March election ==
The first election, to fill the vacancy left by Ross' resignation, was held March 3.

Candidate	Party	Votes	Percent
Thomas J. Rogers	Democratic-Republican	2,926	93.0%
Samuel Sitgreaves	Federalist	220	7.0%

Rogers took his seat March 24, during the First Session

== October election ==
The second election, to fill the vacancy left by Ingham's resignation, was held October 13, the same time as the elections for the 16th Congress

Candidate	Party	Votes	Percent
Samuel Moore	Democratic-Republican	3,936	100%

Moore ran unopposed and took his seat November 16, at the start of the Second Session of the 15th Congress.

== See also ==
- List of special elections to the United States House of Representatives
