= 15th United States Congress =

1817-1819 U.S. Congress

←	14th	16th	→
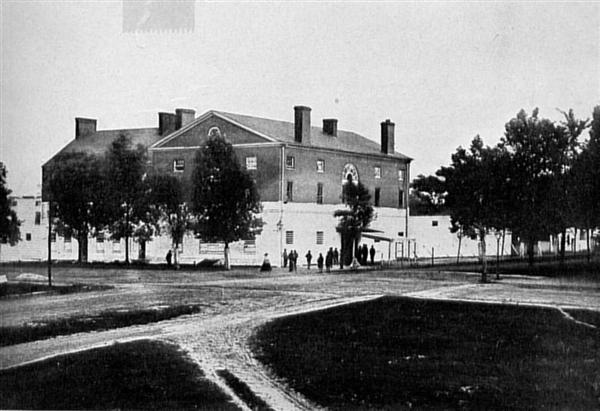
- The Old Brick Capitol, the temporary Capitol while the U.S. Capitol was being renovated after the Burning of Washington. (pictured here around 1861 in use as a Civil War prison)

Overview
- Legislative body: United States Congress
- Jurisdiction: United States
- Term: March 4, 1817 – March 4, 1819

Senate
- Members: 42
- President: Daniel D. Tompkins (DR)
- President pro tempore: James Barbour (DR)
- Party control: Democratic-Republican

House of Representatives
- Members: 185 representatives 3 non-voting delegates
- Speaker: Henry Clay (DR)
- Party control: Democratic-Republican

Sessions
- Special (Note: Special session of the Senate.): March 4, 1817 – March 6, 1817
- 1st: December 1, 1817 – April 20, 1818
- 2nd: November 16, 1818 – March 3, 1819

The 15th United States Congress was a meeting of the legislative branch of the United States federal government, consisting of the United States Senate and the United States House of Representatives. It met in the Old Brick Capitol in Washington, D.C. from March 4, 1817, to March 4, 1819, during the first two years of James Monroe's presidency. The apportionment of seats in the House of Representatives was based on the 1810 United States census. Both chambers had a Democratic-Republican majority.

== Letter of December 1818 ==
Two major treaties with the United Kingdom were approved, finalized and signed during the 15th Congress, both the Rush–Bagot Treaty and the Treaty of 1818, both of which pertained to the United States-Canada border, and both of which were overwhelmingly popular in the United States. President James Monroe and Secretary of State John Quincy Adams were credited with the accomplishments. A letter signed by many members of congress expressing "Gratitude, amity and brotherhood with Great Britain" was addressed to British Prime Minister Robert Jenkinson, 2nd Earl of Liverpool, British Secretary of State for War and the Colonies Henry Bathurst, 3rd Earl Bathurst, British foreign secretary Robert Stewart, Viscount Castlereagh and Britain's minister plenipotentiary and envoy extraordinaire to the United States Charles Bagot. The letter also attacked King Louis XVIII of France for insulting remarks he had made towards American diplomats and about the United States, as well as his refusal to pay reparations owed to the United States from damages incurred during the Quasi-War. The letter was signed in December 1818 by Joel Abbot, Thomas W. Cobb, Zadock Cook, Joel Crawford, John Forsyth, William Terrell, Charles Tait, William Smith, John Gaillard, Henry Middleton, William Lowndes, James Ervin, Joseph Bellinger, Starling Tucker, Eldred Simkins, Elias Earle, Wilson Nesbitt, Stephen Decatur Miller, Montfort Stokes, Nathaniel Macon, Lemuel Sawyer, Joseph Hunter Bryan, Thomas H. Hall, Jesse Slocumb, James Owen, Weldon Nathaniel Edwards, James Stewart, James Strudwick Smith, Thomas Settle, George Mumford, Daniel Munroe Forney, Felix Walker, Lewis Williams, John J. Crittenden, Isham Talbot, David Trimble, Henry Clay, Richard Mentor Johnson, Joseph Desha, Anthony New, David Walker, George Robertson, Richard Clough Anderson Jr., Tunstall Quarles, Thomas Speed, William Hendricks, James Noble, Waller Taylor, John Eaton, John Williams, John Rhea, William Grainger Blount, Francis Jones, Samuel E. Hogg, Thomas Claiborne, George W.L. Marr, George Poindexter, Prentiss Mellen, Harrison Gray Otis, Enoch Lincoln, Jonathan Mason, Nathaniel Silsbee, Jeremiah Nelson, Timothy Fuller, Elijah H. Mills, Samuel Clesson Allen, Henry Shaw, Zabdiel Sampson, Walter Folger Jr., Marcus Morton, Benjamin Adams, Solomon Strong, Nathaniel Ruggles, John Holmes, Ezekiel Whitman, Benjamin Orr, John Wilson, Thomas Rice, Joshua Gage and Albion Parris, all of whom also voted to ratify both of the aforementioned treaties. Several governors also signed the letter, which was entirely symbolic and intended as a gesture of goodwill, including Gabriel Slaughter, William Rabun, John Geddes, John Branch, John Brooks, James Patton Preston and David Holmes. This was significant because the governors and the members of congress were from different regions (both Massachusetts and several southern states were represented), and because signers came from both the Whig Party and the Democratic-Republicans. Many members of congress and Washington DC had a very hostile relationship with France's notoriously combative ambassador Jean-Guillaume, baron Hyde de Neuville, which contributed to the letters contents as per France.

== Major events ==
- March 4, 1817: James Monroe became President of the United States
- July 4, 1817: Construction on the Erie Canal began
- November 20, 1817: The first Seminole War began in Florida
- January 2, 1819: The Panic of 1819, the first major financial crisis in the United States, began.
- February 2, 1819: Dartmouth College v. Woodward: Supreme Court allowed Dartmouth to keep its charter and remain a private institution.

== Major legislation ==
- April 4, 1818: Flag Act of 1818, Sess. 1, ch. 34, 3 Stat. 415

== Treaties ==
- April 29, 1817: Rush–Bagot Treaty signed between the U.S. and the United Kingdom
- October 20, 1818: Treaty of 1818 between the U.S. and the United Kingdom established the northern boundary as the 49th parallel from the Lake of the Woods to the Rocky Mountains, also creating the Northwest Angle.
- February 22, 1819: Adams-Onís Treaty: Spain ceded Florida to the United States

== States admitted and territories created ==
- December 10, 1817: Mississippi admitted as the 20th state
- December 3, 1818: Illinois admitted as the 21st state
- March 2, 1819: Arkansas Territory was created, 3 Stat. 493; it was formerly part of the Missouri Territory

== Party summary ==
The count below identifies party affiliations at the beginning of the first session of this congress. Changes resulting from subsequent replacements are shown below in the "Changes in membership" section.

=== Senate ===
During this congress, two Senate seats were added for each of the new states of Mississippi and Illinois.

	Party (shading shows control)		Total	Vacant
	Democratic- Republican (DR)	Federalist (F)	Total	Vacant
End of previous congress	25	13	38	0
Begin	25	13	38	0
End	28	12	40	2
Final voting share	70.0%	30.0%		
Beginning of next congress	29	9	38	4

=== House of Representatives ===
During this congress, one House seat was added for each of the new states of Mississippi and Illinois.

	Party (shading shows control)		Total	Vacant
	Democratic- Republican (DR)	Federalist (F)	Total	Vacant
End of previous congress	136	46	182	1
Begin	141	39	180	3
End	144	40	184	1
Final voting share	78.3%	21.7%		
Beginning of next congress	158	25	183	2

== Leadership ==
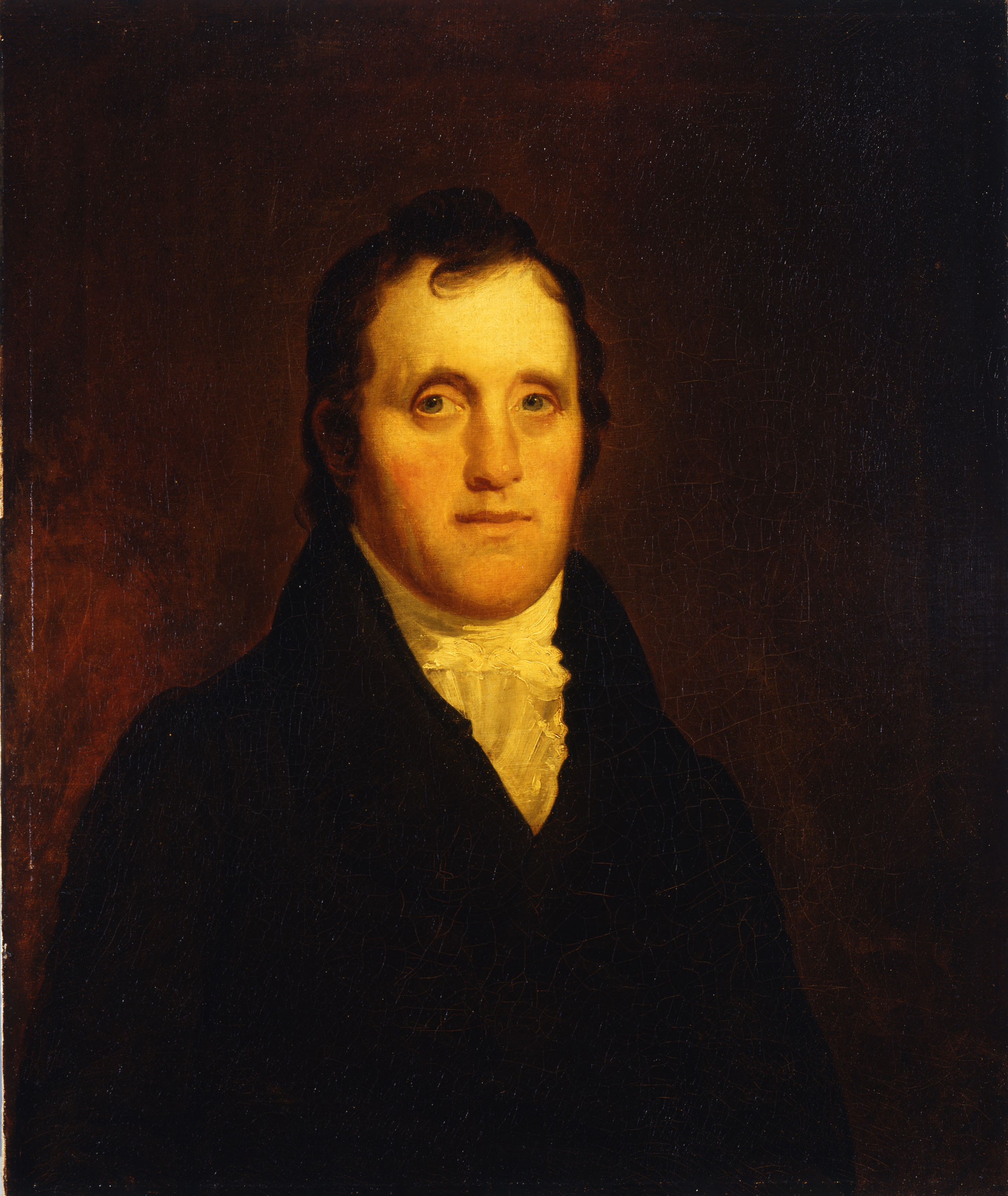
President of the Senate
Daniel D. Tompkins

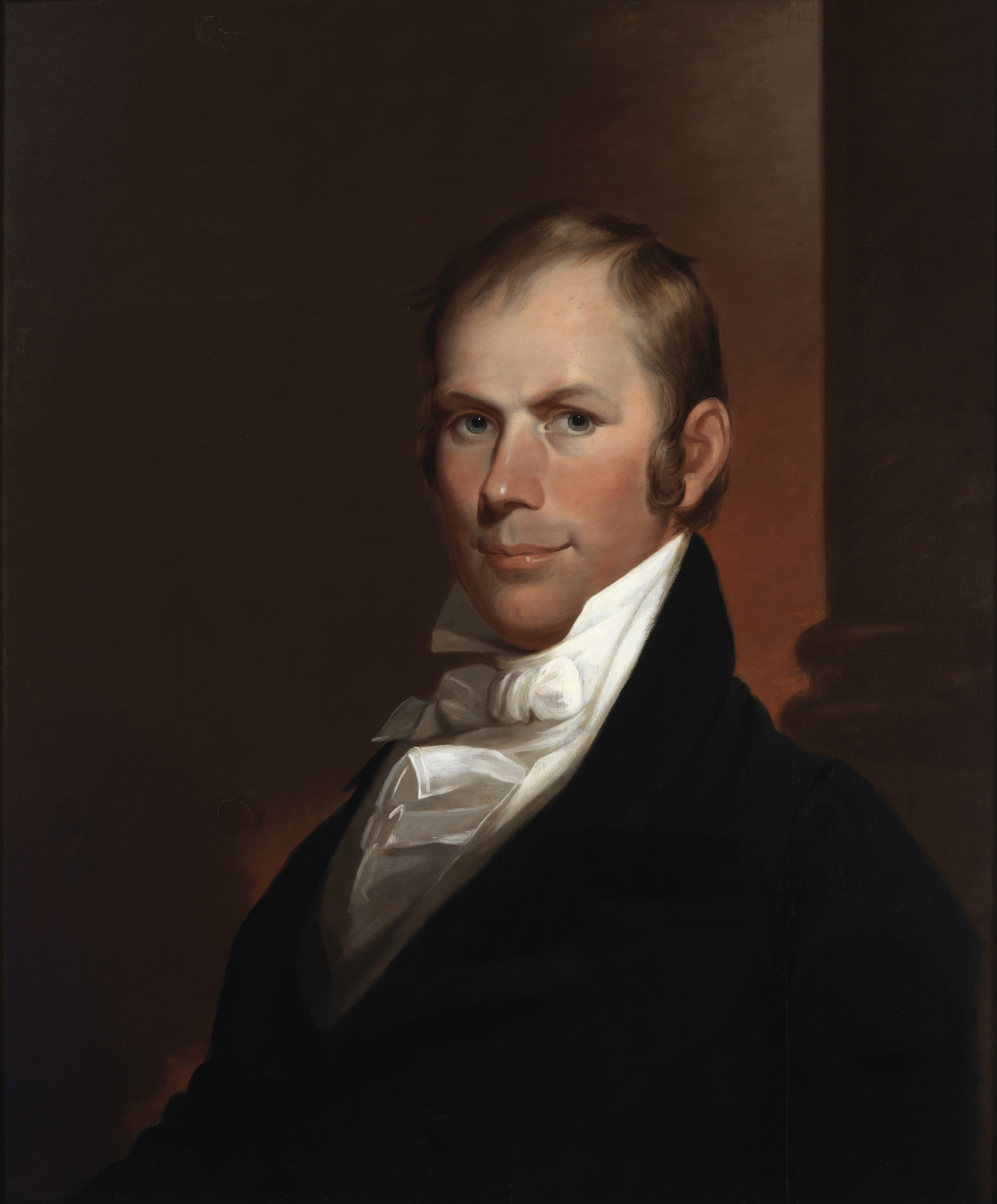
Speaker of the House
Henry Clay

=== Senate ===
- President: Daniel D. Tompkins (DR)
- President pro tempore:
  - John Gaillard (DR), elected March 4, 1817
  - James Barbour (DR), elected February 15, 1819

=== House of Representatives ===
- Speaker: Henry Clay (DR)

== Members ==
This list is arranged by chamber, then by state. Senators are listed by class and representatives are listed by district.

Skip to House of Representatives, below

=== Senate ===
Senators were elected by the state legislatures every two years, with one-third beginning new six-year terms with each Congress. Preceding the names in the list below are Senate class numbers, which indicate the cycle of their election. In this Congress, Class 1 meant their term began in the last Congress, requiring re-election in 1820; Class 2 meant their term began with this Congress, requiring re-election in 1822; and Class 3 meant their term ended with this Congress, requiring re-election in 1818.

==== Connecticut ====
▌1. Samuel W. Dana (F)
▌3. David Daggett (F)

==== Delaware ====
▌1. Outerbridge Horsey (F)
▌2. Nicholas Van Dyke (F)

==== Georgia ====
▌2. George Troup (DR), until September 23, 1818

▌John Forsyth (DR), November 23, 1818 – February 17, 1819

▌3. Charles Tait (DR)

==== Illinois ====
▌2. Jesse B. Thomas (DR), from December 3, 1818 (newly admitted state)
▌3. Ninian Edwards (DR), from December 3, 1818 (newly admitted state)

==== Indiana ====
▌1. James Noble (DR)
▌3. Waller Taylor (DR)

==== Kentucky ====
▌2. John J. Crittenden (DR), until March 3, 1819
▌3. Isham Talbot (DR)

==== Louisiana ====
▌2. William C. C. Claiborne (DR), died November 23, 1817

▌Henry Johnson (DR), from January 12, 1818

▌3. Eligius Fromentin (DR)

==== Maryland ====
▌1. Alexander C. Hanson (F)
▌3. Robert H. Goldsborough (F)

==== Massachusetts ====
▌1. Eli P. Ashmun (F), until May 10, 1818

▌Prentiss Mellen (F), from June 5, 1818

▌2. Harrison Gray Otis (F)

==== Mississippi ====
▌1. Walter Leake (DR), from December 10, 1817 (newly admitted state)
▌2. Thomas H. Williams (DR), from December 10, 1817 (newly admitted state)

==== New Hampshire ====
▌2. David L. Morril (DR)
▌3. Jeremiah Mason (F), until June 16, 1817

▌Clement Storer (DR), from June 27, 1817

==== New Jersey ====
▌1. James J. Wilson (DR)
▌2. Mahlon Dickerson (DR)

==== New York ====
▌1. Nathan Sanford (DR)
▌3. Rufus King (F)

==== North Carolina ====
▌2. Montfort Stokes (DR)
▌3. Nathaniel Macon (DR)

==== Ohio ====
▌1. Benjamin Ruggles (DR)
▌3. Jeremiah Morrow (DR)

==== Pennsylvania ====
▌1. Jonathan Roberts (DR)
▌3. Abner Lacock (DR)

==== Rhode Island ====
▌1. William Hunter (F)
▌2. James Burrill Jr. (F)

==== South Carolina ====
▌2. William Smith (DR)
▌3. John Gaillard (DR)

==== Tennessee ====
▌1. George W. Campbell (DR), until April 20, 1818

▌John H. Eaton (DR), from September 5, 1818

▌2. John Williams (DR)

==== Vermont ====
▌1. Isaac Tichenor (F)
▌3. Dudley Chase (DR), until November 3, 1817

▌James Fisk (DR), November 4, 1817 – January 8, 1818
▌William A. Palmer (DR), from October 20, 1818

==== Virginia ====
▌1. James Barbour (DR)
▌2. John W. Eppes (DR)

Senators' party membership by state at the opening of the 15th Congress in March 1817. The senators from Illinois and Mississippi were not seated until later in the Congress. 2 Democratic-Republicans 1 Democratic-Republican and 1 Federalist 2 Federalists

=== House of Representatives ===
The names of representatives are preceded by their district numbers.

==== Connecticut ====
All representatives were elected statewide on a general ticket.

▌At-large. Uriel Holmes (F), until 1818

▌Sylvester Gilbert (DR), from November 16, 1818

▌At-large. Ebenezer Huntington (F)
▌At-large. Jonathan O. Moseley (F)
▌At-large. Timothy Pitkin (F)
▌At-large. Samuel B. Sherwood (F)
▌At-large. Nathaniel Terry (F)
▌At-large. Thomas S. Williams (F)

==== Delaware ====
Both representatives were elected statewide on a general ticket.

▌At-large. Willard Hall (DR)
▌At-large. Louis McLane (F)

==== Georgia ====
All representatives were elected statewide on a general ticket.

▌At-large. Joel Abbot (DR)
▌At-large. Thomas W. Cobb (DR)
▌At-large. Zadock Cook (DR)
▌At-large. Joel Crawford (DR)
▌At-large. John Forsyth (DR), until November 23, 1818

▌Robert R. Reid (DR), from February 18, 1819

▌At-large. William Terrell (DR)

==== Illinois ====
▌At-large. John McLean (DR), from December 3, 1818 (newly admitted state)

==== Indiana ====
▌At-large. William Hendricks (DR)

==== Kentucky ====
▌1. David Trimble (DR)
▌2. Henry Clay (DR)
▌3. Richard Mentor Johnson (DR)
▌4. Joseph Desha (DR)
▌5. Anthony New (DR)
▌6. David Walker (DR)
▌7. George Robertson (DR)
▌8. Richard C. Anderson Jr. (DR)
▌9. Tunstal Quarles (DR)
▌10. Thomas Speed (DR)

==== Louisiana ====
▌At-large. Thomas B. Robertson (DR), until April 20, 1818

▌Thomas Butler (DR), from November 16, 1818

==== Maryland ====
The 5th district was a plural district with two representatives.

▌1. Philip Stuart (F)
▌2. John C. Herbert (F)
▌3. George Peter (F)
▌4. Samuel Ringgold (DR)
▌5. Peter Little (DR)
▌5. Samuel Smith (DR)
▌6. Philip Reed (DR)
▌7. Thomas Culbreth (DR)
▌8. Thomas Bayly (F)

==== Massachusetts ====
▌1. Jonathan Mason (F)
▌2. Nathaniel Silsbee (DR)
▌3. Jeremiah Nelson (F)
▌4. Timothy Fuller (DR)
▌5. Elijah H. Mills (F)
▌6. Samuel C. Allen (F)
▌7. Henry Shaw (DR)
▌8. Zabdiel Sampson (DR)
▌9. Walter Folger Jr. (DR)
▌10. Marcus Morton (DR)
▌11. Benjamin Adams (F)
▌12. Solomon Strong (F)
▌13. Nathaniel Ruggles (F)
▌14. John Holmes (DR)
▌15. Ezekiel Whitman (F)
▌16. Benjamin Orr (F)
▌17. John Wilson (F)
▌18. Thomas Rice (F)
▌19. Joshua Gage (DR)
▌20. Albion K. Parris (DR), until February 3, 1818

▌Enoch Lincoln (DR), from November 4, 1818

==== Mississippi ====
▌At-large. George Poindexter (DR), from December 10, 1817

==== New Hampshire ====
All representatives were elected statewide on a general ticket.

▌At-large. Josiah Butler (DR)
▌At-large. Clifton Clagett (DR)
▌At-large. Salma Hale (DR)
▌At-large. Arthur Livermore (DR)
▌At-large. John F. Parrott (DR)
▌At-large. Nathaniel Upham (DR)

==== New Jersey ====
All representatives were elected statewide on a general ticket.

▌At-large. Ephraim Bateman (DR)
▌At-large. Benjamin Bennet (DR)
▌At-large. Joseph Bloomfield (DR)
▌At-large. Charles Kinsey (DR)
▌At-large. John Linn (DR)
▌At-large. Henry Southard (DR)

==== New York ====
There were six plural districts, the 1st, 2nd, 12th, 15th, 20th & 21st, each had two representatives.

▌1. Tredwell Scudder (DR)
▌1. George Townsend (DR)
▌2. William Irving (DR)
▌2. Peter H. Wendover (DR)
▌3. Caleb Tompkins (DR)
▌4. James Tallmadge Jr. (DR), from December 1, 1817
▌5. Philip J. Schuyler (F)
▌6. James W. Wilkin (DR)
▌7. Josiah Hasbrouck (DR)
▌8. Dorrance Kirtland (DR)
▌9. Rensselaer Westerlo (F)
▌10. John P. Cushman (F)
▌11. John W. Taylor (DR)
▌12. John Palmer (DR)
▌12. John Savage (DR)
▌13. Thomas Lawyer (DR)
▌14. John Herkimer (DR)
▌15. John R. Drake (DR)
▌15. Isaac Williams Jr. (DR)
▌16. Henry R. Storrs (F)
▌17. Thomas H. Hubbard (DR)
▌18. David A. Ogden (F)
▌19. James Porter (DR)
▌20. Oliver C. Comstock (DR)
▌20. Daniel Cruger (DR)
▌21. Benjamin Ellicott (DR)
▌21. John C. Spencer (DR)

==== North Carolina ====
▌1. Lemuel Sawyer (DR)
▌2. Joseph H. Bryan (DR)
▌3. Thomas H. Hall (DR)
▌4. Jesse Slocumb (F)
▌5. James Owen (DR)
▌6. Weldon N. Edwards (DR)
▌7.James Stewart (F), from January 5, 1818
▌8. James S. Smith (DR)
▌9. Thomas Settle (DR)
▌10. George Mumford (DR), until December 31, 1818

▌Charles Fisher (DR), from February 11, 1819

▌11. Daniel M. Forney (DR), until 1818

▌William Davidson (F), from December 2, 1818

▌12. Felix Walker (DR)
▌13. Lewis Williams (DR)

==== Ohio ====
▌1. William Henry Harrison (DR)
▌2. John W. Campbell (DR)
▌3. Levi Barber (DR)
▌4. Samuel Herrick (DR)
▌5. Philemon Beecher (F)
▌6. Peter Hitchcock (DR)

==== Pennsylvania ====
There were six plural districts, the 2nd, 3rd, 5th, 6th & 10th had two representatives each, the 1st had four representatives.

▌1. William Anderson (DR)
▌1. Joseph Hopkinson (F)
▌1. John Sergeant (F)
▌1. Adam Seybert (DR)
▌2. Isaac Darlington (F)
▌2. Levi Pawling (F)
▌3. James M. Wallace (DR)
▌3. John Whiteside (DR)
▌4. Jacob Spangler (DR), until April 20, 1818

▌Jacob Hostetter (DR), from November 16, 1818

▌5. Andrew Boden (DR)
▌5. William Maclay (DR)
▌6. Samuel D. Ingham (DR), until July 6, 1818

▌Samuel Moore (DR), from October 13, 1818

▌6. John Ross (DR), until February 24, 1818

▌Thomas J. Rogers (DR), from March 3, 1818

▌7. Joseph Hiester (DR)
▌8. Alexander Ogle (DR)
▌9. William P. Maclay (DR)
▌10. John Murray (DR), from October 14, 1817
▌10. William Wilson (DR)
▌11. David Marchand (DR)
▌12. Thomas Patterson (DR)
▌13. Christian Tarr (DR)
▌14. Henry Baldwin (DR)
▌15. Robert Moore (DR)

==== Rhode Island ====
Both representatives were elected statewide on a general ticket.

▌At-large. John L. Boss Jr. (F)
▌At-large. James B. Mason (F)

==== South Carolina ====
▌1. Henry Middleton (DR)
▌2. William Lowndes (DR)
▌3. James Ervin (DR)
▌4. Joseph Bellinger (DR)
▌5. Starling Tucker (DR)
▌6. John C. Calhoun (DR), until November 3, 1817

▌Eldred Simkins (DR), from January 24, 1818

▌7. Elias Earle (DR)
▌8. Wilson Nesbitt (DR)
▌9. Stephen D. Miller (DR)

==== Tennessee ====
▌1. John Rhea (DR)
▌2. William G. Blount (DR)
▌3. Francis Jones (DR)
▌4. Samuel Hogg (DR)
▌5. Thomas Claiborne (DR)
▌6. George W. L. Marr (DR)

==== Vermont ====
All representatives were elected statewide on a general ticket.

▌At-large. Heman Allen (DR), until April 20, 1818; vacant thereafter
▌At-large. Samuel C. Crafts (DR)
▌At-large. William Hunter (DR)
▌At-large. Orsamus C. Merrill (DR)
▌At-large. Charles Rich (DR)
▌At-large. Mark Richards (DR)

==== Virginia ====
▌1. James Pindall (F)
▌2. Edward Colston (F)
▌3. Henry St. George Tucker (DR)
▌4. William McCoy (DR)
▌5. John Floyd (DR)
▌6. Alexander Smyth (DR)
▌7. Ballard Smith (DR)
▌8. Charles F. Mercer (F)
▌9. William Lee Ball (DR)
▌10. George F. Strother (DR)
▌11. Philip P. Barbour (DR)
▌12. Robert S. Garnett (DR)
▌13. Burwell Bassett (DR)
▌14. William A. Burwell (DR)
▌15. William J. Lewis (DR)
▌16. Archibald Austin (DR)
▌17. James Pleasants (DR)
▌18. Thomas M. Nelson (DR)
▌19. Peterson Goodwyn (DR), until February 21, 1818

▌John Pegram (DR), from April 21, 1818

▌20. James Johnson (DR)
▌21. Thomas Newton Jr. (DR)
▌22. Hugh Nelson (DR)
▌23. John Tyler (DR)

==== Non-voting members ====
Alabama Territory. John Crowell, from January 29, 1818
Illinois Territory. Nathaniel Pope, until November 30, 1818, vacant thereafter
Mississippi Territory. Vacant until statehood December 10, 1817
Missouri Territory. John Scott, from August 4, 1817

== Changes in membership ==
The count below reflects changes from the beginning of the first session of this Congress.

=== Senate ===
Senate changes
State (class)	Vacated by	Reason for change	Successor	Date of successor's formal installation (Note: When seated or oath administered, not necessarily when service began.)
New Hampshire (3)	Jeremiah Mason (F)	Resigned June 16, 1817	Clement Storer (DR)	Seated June 27, 1817
Vermont (3)	Dudley Chase (DR)	Resigned November 3, 1817, to become Chief Justice of the Vermont Supreme Court	James Fisk (DR)	Seated November 4, 1817
Louisiana (2)	William C. C. Claiborne (DR)	Died November 23, 1817	Henry Johnson (DR)	Seated January 12, 1818
Mississippi (1)	New seats	Mississippi was admitted to the Union on December 10, 1817	Walter Leake (DR)	Installed December 10, 1817
Mississippi (2)	New seats	Mississippi was admitted to the Union on December 10, 1817	Thomas H. Williams (DR)	Installed December 10, 1817
Vermont (3)	James Fisk (DR)	Resigned January 8, 1818, to become Vermont Collector of Customs. Winner elected October 20, 1818.	William A. Palmer (DR)	Seated October 20, 1818
Tennessee (1)	George W. Campbell (DR)	Resigned April 20, 1818, to become Ambassador to Russia	John Eaton (DR)	Seated September 5, 1818
Massachusetts (1)	Eli P. Ashmun (F)	Resigned May 10, 1818. Winner elected June 5, 1818.	Prentiss Mellen (F)	Seated June 5, 1818
Georgia (2)	George Troup (DR)	Resigned September 23, 1818, to run for Governor of Georgia. Winner elected September 23, 1818.	John Forsyth (DR)	Seated November 23, 1818
Illinois (2)	New seats	Illinois was admitted to the Union on December 3, 1818.	Jesse B. Thomas (DR)	Installed December 3, 1818
Illinois (3)	New seats	Illinois was admitted to the Union on December 3, 1818.	Ninian Edwards (DR)	Installed December 3, 1818
Georgia (2)	John Forsyth (DR)	Resigned February 17, 1819, to become U.S. Minister to Spain. Winner was elected in the next Congress.	Not filled until next Congress	
Kentucky (2)	John J. Crittenden (DR)	Resigned March 3, 1819, to return to private practice. Winner was elected in the next Congress.	Not filled until next Congress	

=== House of Representatives ===
House changes
District	Vacated by	Reason for change	Successor	Date of successor's formal installation
New York 4	Vacant	Member-elect Henry B. Lee died before this Congress began	James Tallmadge Jr. (DR)	Seated June 6, 1817
Missouri Territory at-large	Vacant	Seat remained vacant from March 4, 1817, to August 4, 1817	John Scott	Seated August 4, 1817
Pennsylvania 10	Vacant	Member-elect David Scott resigned before this Congress began	John Murray (DR)	Seated October 14, 1817
North Carolina 7	Vacant	Member-elect Alexander McMillan died before this Congress began	James Stewart (F)	Seated January 5, 1818
South Carolina 6	John C. Calhoun (DR)	Resigned November 3, 1817, after being appointed United States Secretary of War	Eldred Simkins (DR)	Seated January 24, 1818
Mississippi Territory at-large	Vacant	Seat remained vacant until Mississippi was admitted to the Union December 10, 1817	George Poindexter (DR)	Seated December 10, 1817
Mississippi at-large	Vacant	Seat remained vacant until Mississippi was admitted to the Union December 10, 1817	George Poindexter (DR)	Seated December 10, 1817
Connecticut at-large	Uriel Holmes (F)	Resigned sometime in 1818	Sylvester Gilbert (DR)	Seated November 16, 1818
North Carolina 11	Daniel Forney (DR)	Resigned sometime in 1818	William Davidson (F)	Seated December 2, 1818
Alabama Territory at-large	Vacant	The first delegate from this new territory was not seated until January 29, 1818.	John Crowell	Seated January 29, 1818
Massachusetts 20	Albion K. Parris (DR	Resigned February 3, 1818	Enoch Lincoln (DR)	Seated November 4, 1818
Virginia 19	Peterson Goodwyn (DR)	Died February 21, 1818	John Pegram (DR)	Seated April 21, 1818
Pennsylvania 6	John Ross (DR)	Resigned February 24, 1818, to become President Judge of Pennsylvania's 7th Judicial Circuit	Thomas J. Rogers (DR)	Seated March 3, 1818
Louisiana at-large	Thomas B. Robertson (DR)	Resigned April 20, 1818	Thomas Butler (DR)	Seated November 16, 1818
Pennsylvania 4	Jacob Spangler (DR)	Resigned April 20, 1818	Jacob Hostetter (DR)	Seated November 16, 1818
Pennsylvania 6	Samuel D. Ingham (DR)	Resigned July 6, 1818	Samuel Moore (DR)	Seated October 13, 1818
Georgia at-large	John Forsyth (DR)	Resigned November 23, 1818, after being elected to the U.S. Senate	Robert R. Reid (DR)	Seated February 18, 1819
Illinois Territory at-large	Nathaniel Pope	Pope's term ended November 30, 1818, and the seat remained vacant until Illinois was admitted to the Union December 3, 1818	John McLean (DR)	Seated December 3, 1818
Illinois at-large	Nathaniel Pope	Pope's term ended November 30, 1818, and the seat remained vacant until Illinois was admitted to the Union December 3, 1818	John McLean (DR)	Seated December 3, 1818
North Carolina 10	George Mumford (DR)	Died December 31, 1818	Charles Fisher (DR)	Seated February 11, 1819
Vermont at-large	Heman Allen (DR)	resigned April 20, 1818	Vacant	

== Committees ==
Lists of committees and their party leaders.

=== Senate ===
- Audit and Control the Contingent Expenses of the Senate (Chairman: Abner Lacock)
- Claims (Chairman: Jonathan Roberts then Robert Henry Goldsborough)
- Commerce and Manufactures (Chairman: Nathan Sanford)
- District of Columbia (Chairman: Robert Henry Goldsborough)
- Engrossed Bills (Chairman: John J. Crittenden)
- Finance (Chairman: George W. Campbell then John Wayles Eppes)
- Foreign Relations (Chairman: James Barbour then Nathaniel Macon)
- Indian Title to Certain Lands (Select)
- Judiciary (Chairman: John J. Crittenden then James Burrill Jr.)
- Military Affairs (Chairman: George M. Troup then John Williams)
- Militia (Chairman: Clement Storer then Benjamin Ruggles)
- Mississippi's Admission to the Union (Select)
- Naval Affairs (Chairman: Charles Tait then Nathan Sanford)
- Pensions (Chairman: James Noble then Abner Lacock)
- Post Office and Post Roads (Chairman: James J. Wilson then Montfort Stokes)
- Public Lands (Chairman: Jeremiah Morrow)
- Seminole War (Select)
- Slave Trade (Select)
- Whole

=== House of Representatives ===
- Accounts (Chairman: Peter Little)
- Alabama's Admission to the Union (Select)
- Arkansas Territory (Select)
- Bank of the United States (Select)
- Claims (Chairman: Lewis Williams)
- Commerce and Manufactures (Chairman: Thomas Newton Jr.)
- District of Columbia (Chairman: John C. Herbert)
- Elections (Chairman: John W. Taylor)
- Expenditures in the Navy Department (Chairman: James Pleasants)
- Expenditures in the Post Office Department (Chairman: Samuel D. Ingham)
- Expenditures in the State Department (Chairman: John Forsyth)
- Expenditures in the Treasury Department (Chairman: William Lowndes)
- Expenditures in the War Department (Chairman: Richard M. Johnson)
- Expenditures on Public Buildings (Chairman: Henry S. Tucker)
- Judiciary (Chairman: Hugh Nelson)
- Pensions and Revolutionary War Claims (Chairman: John Rhea)
- Private Land Claims (Chairman: Samuel Herrick then George Robertson)
- Post Office and Post Roads (Chairman: Samuel D. Ingham then Arthur Livermore)
- Public Expenditures (Chairman: Joseph Desha)
- Public Lands (Chairman: Thomas B. Robertson then George Poindexter)
- Revisal and Unfinished Business (Chairman: John Savage then John W. Taylor)
- Rules (Select)
- Standards of Official Conduct
- Ways and Means (Chairman: William Lowndes then Samuel Smith)
- Whole

=== Joint committees ===
- Enrolled Bills
- The Library (Chairman: N/A)

== Employees ==
=== Legislative branch agency directors ===
- Architect of the Capitol: Benjamin H. Latrobe, resigned November 20, 1817
  - Charles Bulfinch, appointed January 8, 1818
- Librarian of Congress: George Watterston

=== Senate ===
- Chaplain: Sereno Edwards Dwight, Congregationalist, until December 9, 1817
  - William D. Hawley, Episcopalian, elected December 9, 1817
  - John Clark, Presbyterian, elected November 19, 1818
- Secretary: Charles Cutts
- Sergeant at Arms: Mountjoy Bayly

=== House of Representatives ===
- Chaplain: Burgiss Allison (Baptist)
- Clerk: Thomas Dougherty
- Doorkeeper: Thomas Claxton
- Sergeant at Arms: Thomas Dunn

== See also ==
- 1816 United States elections (elections leading to this Congress)
  - 1816 United States presidential election
  - 1816–17 United States Senate elections
  - 1816–17 United States House of Representatives elections
- 1818 United States elections (elections during this Congress, leading to the next Congress)
  - 1818–19 United States Senate elections
  - 1818–19 United States House of Representatives elections
