= 1818 United States House of Representatives election in Illinois =

Illinois elected its new member sometime in 1818, after gaining statehood.

District	Incumbent			This race	
District	Member	Party	First elected	Results	Candidates
Illinois at-large	None (District created)			Illinois was admitted December 3, 1818. New member elected in 1818. Democratic-Republican gain. New member seated December 4, 1818 to finish the term ending March 3, 1819. The next year, the new member lost re-election.	√ John McLean (Democratic-Republican) 50.2% Daniel P. Cook (Democratic-Republican) 49.8%

== See also ==
- 1819 United States House of Representatives election in Illinois
- 1818 and 1819 United States House of Representatives elections
- List of United States representatives from Illinois
