= 1818 Pennsylvania's 4th congressional district special election =

On April 20, 1818, Jacob Spangler (DR) resigned from Congress, where he had represented Pennsylvania's 4th district. A special election was held that year to fill the resulting vacancy.

== Election results ==
| Candidate | Party | Votes | Percent |
|---|---|---|---|
| Jacob Hostetter | Democratic-Republican | 771 | 49.7% |
| Samuel Bacon | Democratic-Republican | 693 | 44.7% |
| John Clark | | 88 | 5.7% |

Hostetter took his seat on November 16 at the start of the Second Session.

== See also ==
- List of special elections to the United States House of Representatives
