= 1818 Louisiana's at-large congressional district special election =

On April 20, 1818, Thomas B. Robertson (DR) of Louisiana's at-large district resigned. A special election was held to fill the resulting vacancy.

== Election results ==
Candidate	Party	Votes	Percent
Thomas Butler	Democratic-Republican	1,866	45.1%
Edward Livingston	Democratic-Republican	1,384	33.4%
Joseph Johnston		810	19.6%
Fulwar Skipwith		62	1.5%

In addition, Robertson himself received 16 votes, presumably unsolicited. Butler took office on November 16

== See also ==
- List of special elections to the United States House of Representatives
