= 1818 South Carolina's 6th congressional district special election =

On November 3, 1817, John C. Calhoun (DR) of South Carolina's 6th district resigned upon being appointed Secretary of War. A special election was held for his replacement

== Election results ==
Candidate	Party	Votes	Percent
Eldred Simkins	Democratic-Republican	1,563	40.8%
William Butler	Democratic-Republican	1,165	30.4%
Joseph Black	Democratic-Republican	1,102	28.8%

Simkins took office on February 9, 1818

== See also ==
- List of special elections to the United States House of Representatives
