= John Linscom Boss Jr. =

American politician

Coordinates: 41°29′43.6″N 71°18′57.5″W

Member of the U.S. House of Representatives from Rhode Island's at-large district
- In office March 4, 1815 – March 3, 1819
- Preceded by: Richard Jackson Jr.
- Succeeded by: Samuel Eddy

Personal details
- Born: September 7, 1780 Charleston, South Carolina
- Died: August 1, 1819 (aged 38) Newport, Rhode Island
- Resting place: Common Burial Ground; Newport, Rhode Island
- Party: Federalist

John Linscom Boss Jr. (September 7, 1780 – August 1, 1819) was a U.S. representative from Rhode Island.

== Biography ==
Born in Charleston, South Carolina, Boss completed preparatory studies. He studied law, and was admitted to the bar and commenced practice in Newport, Rhode Island. He served as member of the State house of representatives from 1806 to 1815.

Boss was elected as a Federalist to the Fourteenth and Fifteenth Congresses (March 4, 1815 – March 3, 1819).

He died in Newport, Rhode Island, August 1, 1819, and was interred at the Common Burying Ground and Island Cemetery.

== Sources ==
- United States Congress. "John Linscom Boss Jr. (id: B000650)". Biographical Directory of the United States Congress.

U.S. House of Representatives
Preceded by Richard Jackson Jr.	Member of the U.S. House of Representatives from Rhode Island's at-large district 1815–1819	Succeeded by Samuel Eddy
