= James Overstreet =

American politician

Member of the U.S. House of Representatives from South Carolina's 4th district
- In office March 4, 1819 – May 24, 1822
- Preceded by: Joseph Bellinger
- Succeeded by: Andrew R. Govan

Member of the South Carolina Senate from Barnwell District
- In office November 28, 1814 – December 18, 1817
- Preceded by: Joseph Bellinger
- Succeeded by: Lewis Malone Ayer

Member of the South Carolina House of Representatives from Barnwell District
- In office November 28, 1808 – December 18, 1813

Personal details
- Born: February 11, 1773 Barnwell District, Province of South Carolina, British America
- Died: May 24, 1822 (aged 49) China Grove, North Carolina, U.S.
- Resting place: China Grove, North Carolina
- Party: Democratic-Republican
- Profession: lawyer

James Overstreet (February 11, 1773 – May 24, 1822) was a U.S. representative from South Carolina.

Born near Barnwell Court House in the Barnwell District of the Province of South Carolina, Overstreet attended the common schools. He studied law. He was admitted to the bar in 1798 and commenced practice in Barnwell District. He served as member of the state house of representatives from 1808 to 1813.

Overstreet was elected as a Democratic-Republican to the Sixteenth and Seventeenth Congresses and served from March 4, 1819, until his death May 24, 1822, at China Grove, North Carolina, while en route to his home from Washington, D.C. He was interred in Savitz Cemetery at Mount Zion Reformed Church, China Grove, North Carolina.

== See also ==
- List of members of the United States Congress who died in office (1790–1899)

== Sources ==
- United States Congress. "James Overstreet (id: O000142)". Biographical Directory of the United States Congress.

U.S. House of Representatives
Preceded by Joseph Bellinger	Member of the U.S. House of Representatives from South Carolina's 4th congressional district 1819–1822	Succeeded by Andrew R. Govan
