= James Stewart (North Carolina politician) =

American politician

James Stewart (November 11, 1775 – December 29, 1821) was a Congressional Representative from North Carolina.

Stewart was born in Scotland, where he received a liberal education. He immigrated to the United States and settled near Stewartsville, North Carolina. There he engaged in mercantile and agricultural pursuits.

He was a member of the North Carolina House of Commons in 1798 and 1799, and served in the State senate 1802–1804 and 1813–1815.

He was elected as a Federalist to the Fifteenth United States Congress to fill the vacancy caused by the death of Alexander McMillan; he served from January 5, 1818, to March 3, 1819.

About 1800, he built the Stewart-Hawley-Malloy House; it was added to the National Register of Historic Places in 1975.

After congress, he resumed mercantile and agricultural pursuits. He died near Laurinburg, North Carolina, on December 29, 1821 and is intermened in the Old Stewartsville Cemetery, near Laurinburg.

U.S. House of Representatives
Preceded by John Culpepper	Member of the U.S. House of Representatives from North Carolina's 7th congressional district 1818-1819	Succeeded by John Culpepper
