= 1818 North Carolina's 11th congressional district special election =

On November 7, 1818, a special election was held in North Carolina's 11th district to fill a vacancy caused by Daniel M. Forney (DR)'s resignation earlier that year.

== Election results ==
Candidate	Party	Votes	Percent
William Davidson	Federalist	392	51.9%
John Reid	Democratic-Republican	364	48.1%

This seat changed parties after the special election. Davidson took his seat on December 2 during the Second Session of the 15th Congress.

== See also ==
- List of special elections to the United States House of Representatives
