= Joseph Bellinger =

American politician

Member of the U.S. House of Representatives from South Carolina's 4th district
- In office March 4, 1817 – March 3, 1819
- Preceded by: John J. Chappell
- Succeeded by: James Overstreet

Member of the South Carolina Senate from Barnwell District
- In office November 26, 1810 – December 24, 1813

Member of the South Carolina House of Representatives from Barnwell District
- In office November 24, 1806 – December 19, 1809

Member of the South Carolina House of Representatives from St. Luke's Parish
- In office November 22, 1802 – December 19, 1805

Personal details
- Born: 1773 Colleton County, Province of South Carolina, British America
- Died: January 10, 1830 (aged 56–57) Charleston, South Carolina, U.S.
- Resting place: Ashepoo, South Carolina
- Party: Democratic-Republican
- Profession: planter

Joseph Bellinger (1773 – January 10, 1830) was a slave owner and U.S. Representative from South Carolina. He was born at the Bellinger Plantation in Saint Bartholomew Parish, Ashepoo in Colleton County in the Province of South Carolina and was a planter by trade. He owned the "Aeolian Lawn" slave plantation.

He served as member of the State house of representatives from 1802 to 1809 and of the State senate from Barnwell District from 1810 to 1813. Bellinger was elected as a Democratic-Republican to the Fifteenth Congress (March 4, 1817 – March 3, 1819). He was not a candidate for reelection to the Sixteenth Congress.

He died at Charleston, South Carolina, on January 10, 1830, aged around 56 years old. He was interred in the Bellinger private burial ground, Poco Sabo Plantation, Ashepoo, South Carolina.

== Sources ==
- United States Congress. "Joseph Bellinger (id: B000350)". Biographical Directory of the United States Congress.

U.S. House of Representatives
Preceded by John J. Chappell	Member of the U.S. House of Representatives from South Carolina's 4th congressional district 1817–1819	Succeeded by James Overstreet
