= Sylvester Gilbert =

American politician (1755–1846)

Sylvester Gilbert (October 20, 1755 – January 2, 1846) was a United States representative from Connecticut. He was born in Hebron, Connecticut. He pursued classical studies and graduated from Dartmouth College in 1775. Later, he studied law, was admitted to the bar in November 1777, and commenced practice in Hebron.

Gilbert was a member of the Connecticut House of Representatives 1780–1812. He was also the Connecticut attorney for Tolland County, Connecticut 1786–1807. He was the chief judge of the county court and judge of the probate court 1807–1818 and a principal of a law school 1810–1818. He was a member of the Connecticut Senate in 1815 and 1816 and was elected as a Democratic-Republican to the Fifteenth Congress to fill the vacancy caused by the resignation of Uriel Holmes and served from November 16, 1818, to March 3, 1819.

After leaving Congress, he resumed the practice of law in Hebron. Gilbert was again judge of the county court 1820–1825 and a member of the Connecticut House of Representatives in 1826. He died in Hebron, Connecticut in 1846 and was buried in Old Cemetery.

U.S. House of Representatives
Preceded by Uriel Holmes	Member of the U.S. House of Representatives from Connecticut's at-large congressional district 1818–1819	Succeeded by Samuel A. Foot
