= Uriel Holmes =

American politician

Uriel Holmes (August 26, 1764 – May 18, 1827) was a United States representative from Connecticut. He was born in East Haddam, Connecticut, and then moved with his parents to Hartland, Connecticut. He attended the common schools and graduated from Yale College in 1784. Later, he studied law and was admitted to the bar in 1798 and commenced practice in Litchfield, Connecticut.

Holmes was a member of the Connecticut House of Representatives from 1803 until 1805. He served as the prosecuting attorney of Litchfield County from 1807 until 1814 and was judge of the Litchfield County court from 1814 until 1817. Holmes was elected as a Federalist to the Fifteenth Congress and served from March 4, 1817, until his resignation in 1818. He died in Canton, Connecticut, in 1827 and was buried in East Cemetery in Litchfield.

U.S. House of Representatives
Preceded by Epaphroditus Champion	Member of the U.S. House of Representatives from Connecticut's at-large congressional district 1817–1818	Succeeded by Sylvester Gilbert
