= Alexander McMillan (North Carolina politician) =

American politician

Alexander McMillan (1785 – November 13, 1817) was an American lawyer and politician from North Carolina.

McMillan was an attorney who was active in Richmond County, North Carolina, from 1809 until his death. He represented that county in the North Carolina Senate from 1810 to 1812. He was elected as a Federalist to the United States House of Representatives in March 1817. The 15th Congress held its first regular session in December 1817, but before McMillan took his seat, he was killed in a duel in Fayetteville on November 13, 1817.
