= 1830 Vermont gubernatorial election =

- September 7, 1830
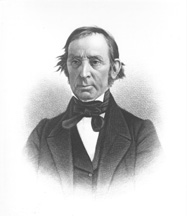

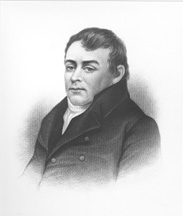

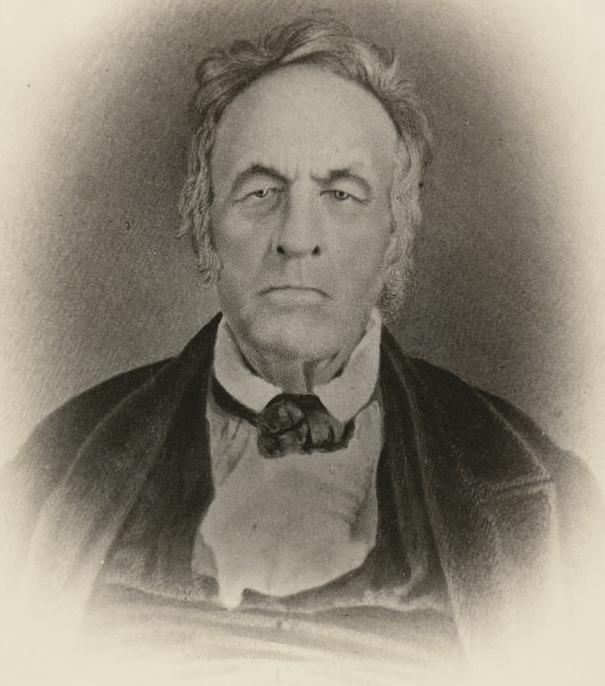
Nominee	Samuel C. Crafts	William A. Palmer	Ezra Meech
Party	National Republican	Anti-Masonic	Jacksonian
Electoral vote	115	72	37
Popular vote	13,476	10,923	6,285
Percentage	43.86%	35.56%	20.46%
- County results Crafts: 40–50% 50–60% Palmer: 50–60% 70–80% Meech: 30–40% 40–50%
Governor before election
Samuel C. Crafts
Democratic-Republican
Elected Governor
Samuel C. Crafts
National Republican

The 1830 Vermont gubernatorial election took place on September 7, 1830. It resulted in the election of Samuel C. Crafts to a one-year term as governor.

In the mid-1820s, the Democratic-Republicans, the only major party following the demise of the Federalists after the War of 1812, began to splinter into supporters and opponents of President Andrew Jackson. The opponents of Jackson were called National Republicans, and adopted the name Whig after the 1832 presidential election. The pro-Jackson party was still referred to as the Democratic-Republican Party, but adopted the name Democratic Party prior to the 1832 elections. The Anti-Masonic Party, which formed in the late 1820s, continued to gather supporters, and had more influence in Vermont than in most other states.

The Vermont General Assembly met in Montpelier on October 14. The Vermont House of Representatives appointed a committee to review the votes of the freemen of Vermont for governor, lieutenant governor, treasurer, and members of the governor's council. The committee determined that no candidate had won a majority for governor or lieutenant governor. In accordance with the Vermont Constitution, the General Assembly was required to choose.

The popular vote for governor was reported as: Total votes, 30,721; Samuel C. Crafts (National Republican), 13,476 (43.9%); William A. Palmer (Anti-Masonic), 10,923 (35.6%); Ezra Meech (Democratic-Republican), 6,285 (20.4%); scattering, 37 (0.01%).

In the election for lieutenant governor, the popular vote totals were: Total votes, 29,847; Mark Richards (National Republican), 12,779 (42.8%); Lebbeus Egerton (Anti-Masonic), 10,594 (35.5%); John Roberts (Democratic-Republican), 6,405 (21.4%); scattering, 69 (0.02%). After numerous ballots over several days failed to produce winners, on Tuesday, October 19 the General Assembly chose Crafts for governor and Richards for lieutenant governor.

With 224 legislators and councilors casting votes for governor on the 32nd ballot, 113 were required for a majority. Crafts received 115, Palmer received 72, and Democratic-Republican William Czar Bradley received 37. For lieutenant governor, 211 members of the General Assembly voted on the third ballot, so 106 were necessary for victory. Richards received 117, Egerton received 57, and Roberts 37.

Benjamin Swan won election to a one-year term as treasurer, his thirty-first. Though he had nominally been a Federalist, Swan was usually endorsed by the Democratic-Republicans and even after the demise of the Federalist Party he was frequently unopposed. In 1830, he was endorsed by the National Republicans and Democratic-Republicans, and opposed by Anti-Masonic candidate Augustine Clarke. In the treasurer's race, the popular vote was reported as: Total votes cast, 28,917; Swan, 18,544 (64.1%); Clarke, 10,325 (35.7%); scattering, 48 (0.02%).

== Results ==
1830 Vermont gubernatorial election
Party	Candidate	Votes	%
National Republican	Samuel C. Crafts (incumbent)	13,476	43.86
Anti-Masonic	William A. Palmer	10,923	35.56
Jacksonian	Ezra Meech	6,285	20.46
Write-in		37	0.12
Total votes		30,721	100.0
