= 16th United States Congress =

1819–1821 U.S. Congress

←	15th	17th	→
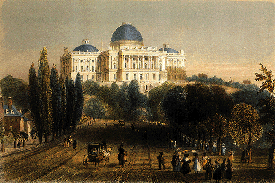
- United States Capitol (1827)

Overview
- Legislative body: United States Congress
- Jurisdiction: United States
- Term: March 4, 1819 – March 4, 1821

Senate
- Members: 46
- President: Daniel D. Tompkins (DR)
- President pro tempore: James Barbour (DR); John Gaillard (DR)
- Party control: Democratic-Republican

House of Representatives
- Members: 186 representatives 3 non-voting delegates
- Speaker: Henry Clay (DR); John W. Taylor (DR)
- Party control: Democratic-Republican

Sessions
- 1st: December 6, 1819 – May 15, 1820
- 2nd: November 13, 1820 – March 3, 1821

The 16th United States Congress was a meeting of the legislative branch of the United States federal government, consisting of the United States Senate and the United States House of Representatives. It met in Washington, D.C. from March 4, 1819, to March 4, 1821, during the third and fourth years of James Monroe's presidency. The apportionment of seats in the House of Representatives was based on the 1810 United States census. Both chambers had a Democratic-Republican majority.

== Major events ==
- A "speech for Buncombe County, North Carolina" given by North Carolina representative Felix Walker in 1820 was credited with introducing into the language the term "bunkum".
- March 6, 1819: McCulloch v. Maryland: Supreme Court ruled that the Bank of the United States is constitutional.
- July 3, 1820: United States House of Representatives elections, 1820 began in Louisiana
- August 7, 1820: 1820 United States census conducted, eventually determining a population of 9,638,453, of which 1,538,022 were slaves.
- November 13–15, 1820: A special election for the House speakership takes 22 ballots.
- December 3, 1820: U.S. presidential election, 1820: James Monroe was re-elected, virtually unopposed.

== Major legislation ==
- March 6, 1820: Missouri Compromise, Sess. 1, ch. 22, 3 Stat. 545
- April 24, 1820: Land Act of 1820, Sess. 1, ch. 51, 3 Stat. 566

=== Proposed but not enacted ===
- Tallmadge Amendment would allow Missouri into the Union as a slave state, but would also implement gradual emancipation in Missouri. The amendment passed the House of Representatives, but not the Senate. The Tallmadge Amendment led to the passage of the Missouri Compromise.

== Treaties ==
- February 22, 1819: Adams-Onís Treaty (Transcontinental Treaty of 1819): Spain ceded Florida to the United States.

== States admitted ==
- December 14, 1819: Alabama was admitted as the 22nd state, 3 Stat. 492.
- March 15, 1820: Maine was admitted as the 23rd state. It was formerly the District of Maine, part of Massachusetts, 3 Stat. 544.

== Party summary ==
The count below identifies party affiliations at the beginning of the first session of this congress. Changes resulting from subsequent replacements are shown below in the "Changes in membership" section.

=== Senate ===
During this congress, two Senate seats were added for each of the new states of Alabama and Maine.

	Party (shading shows control)		Total	Vacant
	Democratic- Republican (DR)	Federalist (F)	Total	Vacant
End of previous congress	28	12	40	2
Begin	29	9	38	4
End	38	8	46	0
Final voting share	82.6%	17.4%		
Beginning of next congress	40	4	44	2

=== House of Representatives ===
During this congress, one House seat was added for the new state of Alabama and one seat was reapportioned from Massachusetts to the new state of Maine. For the beginning of the next congress, six more seats from Massachusetts would be reapportioned to Maine.

	Party (shading shows control)		Total	Vacant
	Democratic- Republican (DR)	Federalist (F)	Total	Vacant
End of previous congress	146	39	185	0
Begin	155	28	183	2
End	155	27	182	5
Final voting share	85.2%	14.8%		
Beginning of next congress	150	31	181	5

== Leadership ==
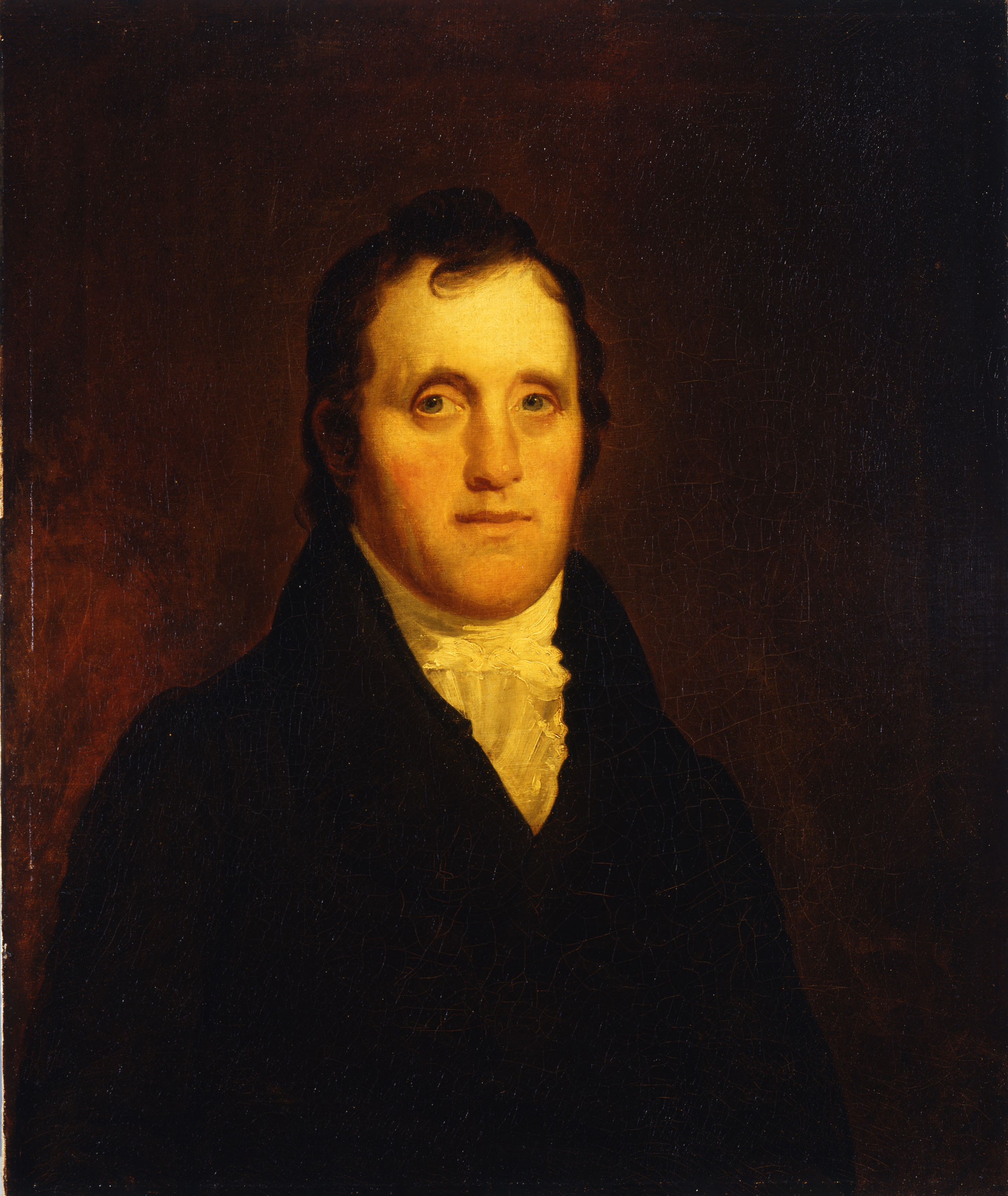
President of the Senate Daniel D. Tompkins

=== Senate ===
- President: Daniel D. Tompkins (DR)
- President pro tempore: James Barbour, (DR), until December 26, 1819
  - John Gaillard, (DR), elected January 25, 1820

=== House of Representatives ===
- Speaker: Henry Clay (DR), resigned October 28, 1820
  - John Taylor, (DR), elected November 15, 1820, on the 22nd ballot

== Members ==
This list is arranged by chamber, then by state. Senators are listed by class and representatives are listed by district.

Skip to House of Representatives, below

=== Senate ===
Senators were elected by the state legislatures every two years, with one-third beginning new six-year terms with each Congress. Preceding the names in the list below are Senate class numbers, which indicate the cycle of their election. In this Congress, Class 1 meant their term ended with this Congress, requiring re-election in 1820; Class 2 meant their term began in the last Congress, requiring re-election in 1822; and Class 3 meant their term began in this Congress, requiring re-election in 1824.

==== Alabama ====
▌2. William R. King (DR), from December 14, 1819 (newly admitted state)
▌3. John W. Walker (DR), from December 14, 1819 (newly admitted state)

==== Connecticut ====
▌1. Samuel W. Dana (F)
▌3. James Lanman (DR)

==== Delaware ====
▌1. Outerbridge Horsey (F)
▌2. Nicholas Van Dyke (F)

==== Georgia ====
▌2. Freeman Walker (DR), from November 6, 1819
▌3. John Elliott (DR)

==== Illinois ====
▌2. Jesse B. Thomas (DR)
▌3. Ninian Edwards (DR)

==== Indiana ====
▌1. James Noble (DR)
▌3. Waller Taylor (DR)

==== Kentucky ====
▌2. Richard M. Johnson (DR), from December 10, 1819
▌3. William Logan (DR), until May 28, 1820

▌Isham Talbot (DR), from October 19, 1820

==== Louisiana ====
▌2. Henry Johnson (DR)
▌3. James Brown (DR)

==== Maine ====
▌1. John Holmes (DR), from June 13, 1820 (newly admitted state)
▌2. John Chandler (DR), from June 14, 1820 (newly admitted state)

==== Maryland ====
▌1. Alexander C. Hanson (F), until April 23, 1819

▌William Pinkney (DR), from December 21, 1819

▌3. Edward Lloyd (DR), from December 21, 1819

==== Massachusetts ====
▌1. Prentiss Mellen (F), until May 15, 1820

▌Elijah H. Mills (F), from June 12, 1820

▌2. Harrison Gray Otis (F)

==== Mississippi ====
▌1. Walter Leake (DR), until May 15, 1820

▌David Holmes (DR), from August 30, 1820

▌2. Thomas H. Williams (DR)

==== New Hampshire ====
▌2. David L. Morril (DR)
▌3. John F. Parrott (DR)

==== New Jersey ====
▌1. James J. Wilson (DR), until January 8, 1821

▌Samuel L. Southard (DR), from January 26, 1821

▌2. Mahlon Dickerson (DR)

==== New York ====
▌1. Nathan Sanford (DR)
▌3. Rufus King (F), from January 25, 1820

==== North Carolina ====
▌2. Montfort Stokes (DR)
▌3. Nathaniel Macon (DR)

==== Ohio ====
▌1. Benjamin Ruggles (DR)
▌3. William A. Trimble (DR)

==== Pennsylvania ====
▌1. Jonathan Roberts (DR)
▌3. Walter Lowrie (DR)

==== Rhode Island ====
▌1. William Hunter (F)
▌2. James Burrill Jr. (F), until December 25, 1820

▌Nehemiah R. Knight (DR), from January 9, 1821

==== South Carolina ====
▌2. William Smith (DR)
▌3. John Gaillard (DR)

==== Tennessee ====
▌1. John H. Eaton (DR)
▌2. John Williams (DR)

==== Vermont ====
▌1. Isaac Tichenor (F)
▌3. William A. Palmer (DR)

==== Virginia ====
▌1. James Barbour (DR)
▌2. John W. Eppes (DR), until December 4, 1819

▌James Pleasants (DR), from December 10, 1819

Senators' party membership by state at the opening of the 16th Congress in March 1819. The senators from Alabama and Maine were not seated until later in the Congress. 2 Democratic-Republicans 1 Democratic-Republican and 1 Federalist 2 Federalists

=== House of Representatives ===
==== Alabama ====
▌At-large. John Crowell (DR), from December 14, 1819 (newly admitted state)

==== Connecticut ====
All representatives were elected statewide on a general ticket.

▌At-large. Henry W. Edwards (DR)
▌At-large. Samuel A. Foote (DR)
▌At-large. Jonathan O. Moseley (DR)
▌At-large. Elisha Phelps (DR)
▌At-large. John Russ (DR)
▌At-large. James Stevens (DR)
▌At-large. Gideon Tomlinson (DR)

==== Delaware ====
Both representatives were elected statewide on a general ticket.

▌At-large. Willard Hall (DR), until January 22, 1821, vacant thereafter
▌At-large. Louis McLane (F)

==== Georgia ====
All representatives were elected statewide on a general ticket.

▌At-large. Joel Abbot (DR)
▌At-large. Thomas W. Cobb (DR)
▌At-large. Joel Crawford (DR)
▌At-large. John A. Cuthbert (DR)
▌At-large. Robert R. Reid (DR)
▌At-large. William Terrell (DR)

==== Illinois ====
▌At-large. Daniel P. Cook (DR)

==== Indiana ====
▌At-large. William Hendricks (DR)

==== Kentucky ====
▌1. David Trimble (DR)
▌2. Henry Clay (DR)
▌3. William Brown (DR)
▌4. Thomas Metcalfe (DR)
▌5. Alney McLean (DR)
▌6. David Walker (DR), until March 1, 1820

▌Francis Johnson (DR), from November 13, 1820

▌7. George Robertson (DR)
▌8. Richard C. Anderson Jr. (DR)
▌9. Tunstal Quarles (DR), until June 15, 1820

▌Thomas Montgomery (DR), from November 13, 1820

▌10. Benjamin Hardin (DR)

==== Louisiana ====
▌At-large. Thomas Butler (DR)

==== Maine ====
▌Maine at-large. Joseph Dane (F), seated December 11, 1820 (newly admitted state) (Note: Joseph Dane (Maine) was elected November 7, 1820.)

==== Maryland ====
The 5th district was a plural district with two representatives.

▌1. Raphael Neale (F)
▌2. Joseph Kent (DR)
▌3. Henry R. Warfield (F)
▌4. Samuel Ringgold (DR)
▌5. Peter Little (DR)
▌5. Samuel Smith (DR)
▌6. Stevenson Archer (DR)
▌7. Thomas Culbreth (DR)
▌8. Thomas Bayly (F)

==== Massachusetts ====
▌1. Jonathan Mason (F), until May 15, 1820

▌Benjamin Gorham (DR), from November 27, 1820

▌2. Nathaniel Silsbee (DR)
▌3. Jeremiah Nelson (F)
▌4. Timothy Fuller (DR)
▌5. Samuel Lathrop (F)
▌6. Samuel C. Allen (F)
▌7. Henry Shaw (DR)
▌8. Zabdiel Sampson (DR), until July 26, 1820

▌Aaron Hobart (DR), from December 18, 1820

▌9. Walter Folger Jr. (DR)
▌10. Marcus Morton (DR)
▌11. Benjamin Adams (F)
▌12. Jonas Kendall (F)
▌13. Edward Dowse (DR), until May 26, 1820

▌William Eustis (DR), from November 13, 1820

▌14. John Holmes (DR), until March 15, 1820, vacant thereafter
▌15. Ezekiel Whitman (F)
▌16. Mark L. Hill (DR)
▌17. Martin Kinsley (DR)
▌18. James Parker (DR)
▌19. Joshua Cushman (DR)
▌20. Enoch Lincoln (DR)

==== Mississippi ====
▌At-large. Christopher Rankin (DR)

==== New Hampshire ====
All representatives were elected statewide on a general ticket.

▌At-large. Joseph Buffum Jr. (DR)
▌At-large. Josiah Butler (DR)
▌At-large. Clifton Clagett (DR)
▌At-large. Arthur Livermore (DR)
▌At-large. William Plumer Jr. (DR)
▌At-large. Nathaniel Upham (DR)

==== New Jersey ====
All representatives were elected statewide on a general ticket.

▌At-large. Ephraim Bateman (DR)
▌At-large. Joseph Bloomfield (DR)
▌At-large. John Condit (DR), until November 4, 1819

▌Charles Kinsey (DR), from February 16, 1820

▌At-large. John Linn (DR), until January 5, 1821, vacant thereafter
▌At-large. Bernard Smith (DR)
▌At-large. Henry Southard (DR)

==== New York ====
There were six plural districts, the 1st, 2nd, 12th, 15th, 20th & 21st, each had two representatives.

▌1. James Guyon Jr. (DR), from January 14, 1820
▌1. Silas Wood (F)
▌2. Henry Meigs (DR)
▌2. Peter H. Wendover (DR)
▌3. Caleb Tompkins (DR)
▌4. Randall S. Street (F)
▌5. James Strong (F)
▌6. Walter Case (DR)
▌7. Jacob H. De Witt (DR)
▌8. Robert Clark (DR)
▌9. Solomon Van Rensselaer (F)
▌10. John D. Dickinson (F)
▌11. John W. Taylor (DR)
▌12. Ezra C. Gross (DR)
▌12. Nathaniel Pitcher (DR)
▌13. Harmanus Peek (DR)
▌14. John Fay (DR)
▌15. Joseph S. Lyman (DR)
▌15. Robert Monell (DR)
▌16. Henry R. Storrs (F)
▌17. Aaron Hackley Jr. (DR)
▌18. William D. Ford (DR)
▌19. George Hall (DR)
▌20. Caleb Baker (DR)
▌20. Jonathan Richmond (DR)
▌21. Nathaniel Allen (DR)
▌21. Albert H. Tracy (DR)

==== North Carolina ====
▌1. Lemuel Sawyer (DR)
▌2. Hutchins G. Burton (DR), from December 6, 1819
▌3. Thomas H. Hall (DR)
▌4. Jesse Slocumb (F), until December 20, 1820

▌William S. Blackledge (DR), from February 7, 1821

▌5. Charles Hooks (DR)
▌6. Weldon N. Edwards (DR)
▌7. John Culpepper (F)
▌8. James S. Smith (DR)
▌9. Thomas Settle (DR)
▌10. Charles Fisher (DR)
▌11. William Davidson (F)
▌12. Felix Walker (DR)
▌13. Lewis Williams (DR)

==== Ohio ====
▌1. Thomas R. Ross (DR)
▌2. John W. Campbell (DR)
▌3. Henry Brush (DR)
▌4. Samuel Herrick (DR)
▌5. Philemon Beecher (F)
▌6. John Sloane (DR)

==== Pennsylvania ====
There were six plural districts, the 2nd, 3rd, 5th, 6th & 10th had two representatives each, the 1st had four representatives.

▌1. Samuel Edwards (F)
▌1. Thomas Forrest (F)
▌1. Joseph Hemphill (F)
▌1. John Sergeant (F)
▌2. William Darlington (DR)
▌2. Samuel Gross (DR)
▌3. Jacob Hibshman (DR)
▌3. James M. Wallace (DR)
▌4. Jacob Hostetter (DR)
▌5. Andrew Boden (DR)
▌5. David Fullerton (DR), until May 15, 1820

▌Thomas G. McCullough (F), from November 13, 1820

▌6. Samuel Moore (DR)
▌6. Thomas J. Rogers (DR)
▌7. Joseph Hiester (DR), until December 1820

▌Daniel Udree (DR), from January 8, 1821

▌8. Robert Philson (DR)
▌9. William P. Maclay (DR)
▌10. George Denison (DR)
▌10. John Murray (DR)
▌11. David Marchand (DR)
▌12. Thomas Patterson (DR)
▌13. Christian Tarr (DR)
▌14. Henry Baldwin (DR)
▌15. Robert Moore (DR)

==== Rhode Island ====
Both representatives were elected statewide on a general ticket.

▌At-large. Samuel Eddy (DR)
▌At-large. Nathaniel Hazard (DR), until December 17, 1820; vacant thereafter

==== South Carolina ====
▌1. Charles Pinckney (DR)
▌2. William Lowndes (DR)
▌3. James Ervin (DR)
▌4. James Overstreet (DR)
▌5. Starling Tucker (DR)
▌6. Eldred Simkins (DR)
▌7. Elias Earle (DR)
▌8. John McCreary (DR)
▌9. Joseph Brevard (DR)

==== Tennessee ====
▌1. John Rhea (DR)
▌2. John Cocke (DR)
▌3. Francis Jones (DR)
▌4. Robert Allen (DR)
▌5. Newton Cannon (DR)
▌6. Henry H. Bryan (DR)

==== Vermont ====
All representatives were elected statewide on a general ticket.

▌At-large. Samuel C. Crafts (DR)
▌At-large. Ezra Meech (DR)
▌At-large. Orsamus C. Merrill (DR), until January 12, 1820

▌Rollin C. Mallary (DR), from January 13, 1820

▌At-large. Charles Rich (DR)
▌At-large. Mark Richards (DR)
▌At-large. William Strong (DR)

==== Virginia ====
▌1. James Pindall (F), until July 26, 1820

▌Edward B. Jackson (DR), from November 13, 1820

▌2. Thomas Van Swearingen (F)
▌3. Jared Williams (DR)
▌4. William McCoy (DR)
▌5. John Floyd (DR)
▌6. Alexander Smyth (DR)
▌7. Ballard Smith (DR)
▌8. Charles F. Mercer (F)
▌9. William Lee Ball (DR)
▌10. George F. Strother (DR), until February 10, 1820

▌Thomas L. Moore (DR), from November 13, 1820

▌11. Philip P. Barbour (DR)
▌12. Robert S. Garnett (DR)
▌13. Severn E. Parker (DR)
▌14. William A. Burwell (DR), until February 16, 1821, vacant for remainder of term
▌15. George Tucker (DR)
▌16. John Randolph (DR)
▌17. James Pleasants (DR), until December 14, 1819

▌William S. Archer (DR), from January 18, 1820

▌18. Mark Alexander (DR)
▌19. James Jones (DR)
▌20. James Johnson (DR), until February 1, 1820

▌John C. Gray (DR), from November 13, 1820

▌21. Thomas Newton Jr. (DR)
▌22. Hugh Nelson (DR)
▌23. John Tyler (DR)

==== Non-voting members ====
Alabama Territory: Vacant until statehood
Arkansas Territory. James W. Bates, from December 21, 1819
Michigan Territory. William Woodbridge, until August 9, 1820

Solomon Sibley, from November 20, 1820

Missouri Territory. John Scott

== Changes in membership ==
The count below reflects changes from the beginning of this Congress.

=== Senate ===
There were 5 resignations, 2 deaths, 2 vacancies before the Congress, and 4 new seats. The Democratic-Republicans had a 7-seat net gain and the Federalists had a 1-seat net loss.

Senate changes
State (class)	Vacated by	Reason for change	Successor	Date of successor's formal installation (Note: When seated or oath administered, not necessarily when service began.)
Georgia (2)	Vacant	John Forsyth had resigned before the beginning of the Congress.	Freeman Walker (DR)	Elected November 6, 1819
Kentucky (2)	Vacant	John J. Crittenden had resigned before the beginning of the Congress.	Richard Mentor Johnson (DR)	Elected December 10, 1819
Maryland (3)	Vacant	Legislature did not elect until after the term began.	Edward Lloyd (DR)	Elected December 14, 1819, and qualified December 21, 1819
New York (3)	Vacant	Legislature failed to elect, held late election.	Rufus King (F)	Elected January 8, 1820, and qualified January 25, 1820
Maryland (1)	Alexander C. Hanson (F)	Died April 23, 1819	William Pinkney (DR)	Elected December 21, 1819
Virginia (2)	John W. Eppes (DR)	Resigned December 4, 1819	James Pleasants (DR)	Elected December 10, 1819
Alabama (2)	New seats	Alabama was admitted to the Union December 14, 1819.	John W. Walker (DR)	Elected December 14, 1819
Alabama (3)	New seats	Alabama was admitted to the Union December 14, 1819.	William R. King (DR)	Elected December 14, 1819
Maine (2)	New seats	Maine was admitted to the Union March 15, 1820.	John Holmes (DR)	Elected June 13, 1820
Maine (1)	New seats	Maine was admitted to the Union March 15, 1820.	John Chandler (DR)	Elected June 14, 1820
Massachusetts (1)	Prentiss Mellen (F)	Resigned May 15, 1820	Elijah H. Mills (F)	Elected June 12, 1820
Mississippi (1)	Walter Leake (DR)	Resigned May 15, 1820, after becoming US Marshal for Mississippi	David Holmes (DR)	Appointed August 30, 1820
Kentucky (3)	William Logan (DR)	Resigned May 28, 1820, to run for Governor of Kentucky	Isham Talbot (DR)	Elected October 19, 1820
Rhode Island (2)	James Burrill Jr. (F)	Died December 25, 1820	Nehemiah R. Knight (DR)	Elected January 9, 1821
New Jersey (1)	James J. Wilson (DR)	Resigned January 8, 1821	Samuel L. Southard (DR)	Appointed January 26, 1821

=== House of Representatives ===
There were 13 resignations, 5 deaths, 2 contested elections, and 2 new seats. The Democratic-Republicans had a 1-seat net gain and the Federalists had no net change.

House changes
District	Vacated by	Reason for change	Successor	Date of successor's formal installation
North Carolina; 2nd	Vacant		Hutchins G. Burton (DR)	Seated December 6, 1819
Alabama Territory	Vacant	Seat remained vacant until statehood	John Crowell (DR)	Seated December 14, 1819
Alabama at-large	Vacant	Seat remained vacant until statehood	John Crowell (DR)	Seated December 14, 1819
Arkansas Territory	Vacant	Arkansas Territory organized July 4, 1819	James W. Bates	Seated December 21, 1819
New York; 1st	Vacant	Contested election. Representative-elect Ebenezer Sage never qualified.	James Guyon Jr. (DR)	Seated January 14, 1820
New Jersey at-large	John Condit (DR)	Resigned November 4, 1819	Charles Kinsey (DR)	Seated February 16, 1820
Virginia 17th	James Pleasants (DR)	Resigned December 14, 1819	William S. Archer (DR)	Seated January 18, 1820
Vermont 1st	Orsamus C. Merrill (DR)	Contested election, served until January 12, 1820	Rollin C. Mallary (DR)	Seated January 13, 1820
Virginia 20th	James Johnson (DR)	Resigned February 1, 1820	John C. Gray (DR)	Seated November 13, 1820
Virginia 10th	George F. Strother (DR)	Resigned February 10, 1820	Thomas L. Moore (DR)	Seated November 13, 1820
Kentucky; 6th	David Walker (DR)	Died March 1, 1820	Francis Johnson (DR)	Seated November 13, 1820
Massachusetts; 14th	John Holmes (DR)	Resigned March 15, 1820, to become U.S. Senator from Maine.	District moved to Maine	District inactive until 1903
Maine at-large	New seat	Massachusetts's 14th district became Maine's at-large district	Joseph Dane (F)	Seated November 6, 1820
Massachusetts; 1st	Jonathan Mason (F)	Resigned May 15, 1820	Benjamin Gorham (DR)	Seated November 27, 1820
Pennsylvania; 5th	David Fullerton (DR)	Resigned May 15, 1820	Thomas G. McCullough (F)	Seated November 13, 1820
Massachusetts; 13th	Edward Dowse (DR)	Resigned May 26, 1820	William Eustis (DR)	Seated November 13, 1820
Kentucky; 9th	Tunstall Quarles (DR)	Resigned June 15, 1820	Thomas Montgomery (DR)	Seated November 13, 1820
Virginia 1st	James Pindall (F)	Resigned July 26, 1820	Edward B. Jackson (DR)	Seated November 13, 1820
Massachusetts; 8th	Zabdiel Sampson (DR)	Resigned July 26, 1820	Aaron Hobart (DR)	Seated December 18, 1820
Michigan Territory	William Woodbridge	Resigned August 9, 1820	Solomon Sibley	Seated November 20, 1820
Pennsylvania; 7th	Joseph Hiester (DR)	Resigned sometime in December 1820	Daniel Udree (DR)	Seated January 8, 1821
Rhode Island at-large	Nathaniel Hazard (DR)	Died December 17, 1820	Vacant	Not filled in this Congress
North Carolina; 4th	Jesse Slocumb (F)	Died December 20, 1820	William S. Blackledge (DR)	Seated February 7, 1821
New Jersey at-large	John Linn (DR)	Died January 5, 1821	Vacant	Not filled in this Congress
Delaware at-large	Willard Hall (DR)	Resigned January 22, 1821	Vacant	Not filled in this Congress
Virginia 14th	William A. Burwell (DR)	Died February 16, 1821	Vacant	Not filled in this Congress

== Committees ==
Lists of committees and their party leaders.

=== Senate ===
- Amendments to the Constitution (Select)
- American Colonization Society (Select)
- Audit and Control the Contingent Expenses of the Senate (Chairman: Jonathan Roberts)
- Claims (Chairman: Jonathan Roberts then James J. Wilson)
- Commerce and Manufactures (Chairman: Nathan Sanford then Mahlon Dickerson)
- Constitution of the State of Alabama (Select)
- District of Columbia (Chairman: Outerbridge Horsey)
- Engrossed Bills (Chairman: Prentiss Mellen)
- Finance (Chairman: Nathan Sanford)
- Foreign Relations (Chairman: James Brown then James Barbour)
- Indian Affairs (Chairman: David Holmes)
- Judiciary (Chairman: William Smith)
- Land Commissioner Reports (Select)
- Military Affairs (Chairman: John Williams)
- Militia (Chairman: James Noble)
- Missouri's Admission to the Union (Select)
- Naval Affairs (Chairman: James Pleasants)
- Pensions (Chairman: Nicholas Van Dyke then James Noble)
- Post Office and Post Roads (Chairman: Montfort Stokes)
- Public Buildings (Select)
- Public Lands (Chairman: Thomas Hill Williams then Jesse B. Thomas)
- Purchase of Fire Engines (Select)
- Reduction of Congressional Salaries (Select)
- Roads and Canals (Select) (Chairman: Rufus King)
- Whole

=== House of Representatives ===
- Accounts (Chairman: James S. Smith)
- Agriculture (Chairman: Thomas Forrest)
- Apportionment of Representatives (Select)
- Army Appropriations Inquiry (Select)
- Bank of the United States (Select)
- Brownstown Treaty (Select)
- Claims (Chairman: Lewis Williams)
- Commerce (Chairman: Thomas Newton Jr.)
- District of Columbia (Chairman: Joseph Kent)
- Elections (Chairman: John W. Taylor then David Trimble)
- Expenditures in the Navy Department (Chairman: Stevenson Archer)
- Expenditures in the Post Office Department (Chairman: Arthur Livermore)
- Expenditures in the State Department (Chairman: John Holmes)
- Expenditures in the Treasury Department (Chairman: David Trimble)
- Expenditures in the War Department (Chairman: Henry Brush)
- Expenditures on Public Buildings (Chairman: Henry Meigs)
- Judiciary (Chairman: John Sergeant)
- Manufactures (Chairman: Henry Baldwin)
- Pensions and Revolutionary Claims (Chairman: John Rhea)
- Post Office and Post Roads (Chairman: Arthur Livermore)
- Private Land Claims (Chairman: John W. Campbell)
- Public Expenditures (Chairman: Eldred Simkins)
- Public Lands (Chairman: Richard C. Anderson Jr.)
- Revisal and Unfinished Business (Chairman: Marcus Morton)
- Rules (Select)
- Standards of Official Conduct
- Ways and Means (Chairman: Samuel Smith)
- Whole

=== Joint committees ===
- Enrolled Bills
- Investigate Safety of Roofs over Senate and House Wings of the Capitol
- The Library

== Officers ==
=== Legislative branch agency directors ===
- Architect of the Capitol: Charles Bulfinch
- Librarian of Congress: George Watterston

=== Senate ===
- Chaplain: John Clark (Presbyterian), until December 9, 1819
  - Reuben Post (Presbyterian), elected December 9, 1819
  - William Ryland (Methodist), elected November 17, 1820
- Secretary: Charles Cutts
- Sergeant at Arms: Mountjoy Bayly

=== House of Representatives ===
- Chaplain: Burgiss Allison (Baptist), until November 16, 1820
  - John N. Campbell (Presbyterian), elected November 16, 1820
- Clerk: Thomas Dougherty
- Doorkeeper: Thomas Claxton
- Sergeant at Arms: Thomas Dunn

== See also ==
- 1818 United States elections (elections leading to this Congress)
  - 1818–19 United States Senate elections
  - 1818–19 United States House of Representatives elections
- 1820 United States elections (elections during this Congress, leading to the next Congress)
  - 1820 United States presidential election
  - 1820–21 United States Senate elections
  - 1820–21 United States House of Representatives elections
