= 1831 Vermont gubernatorial election =

- September 6, 1831
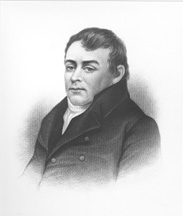

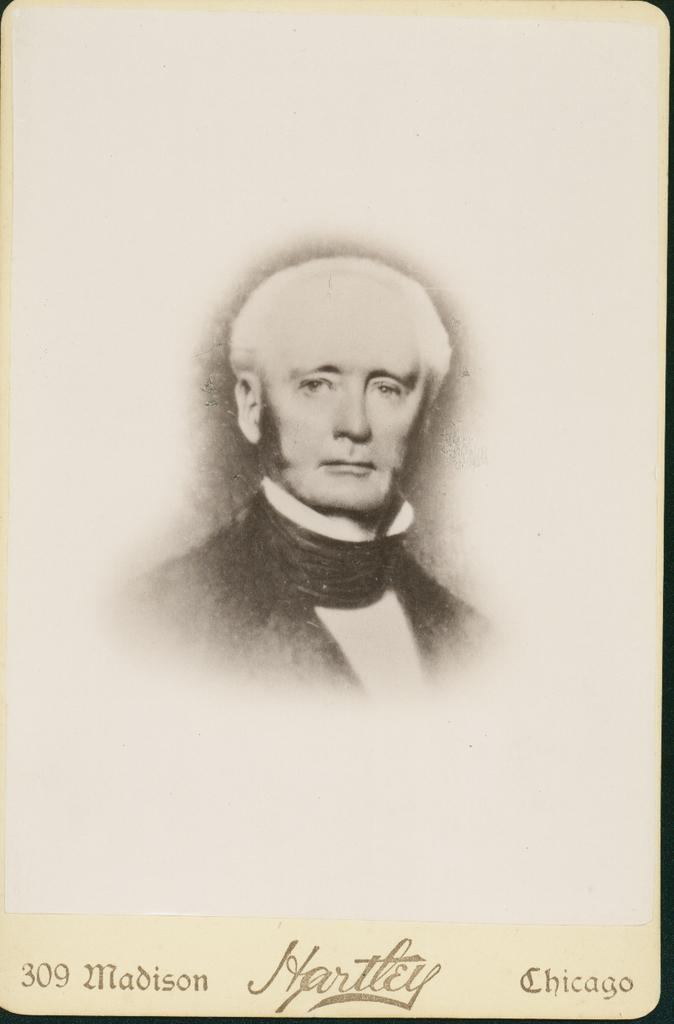

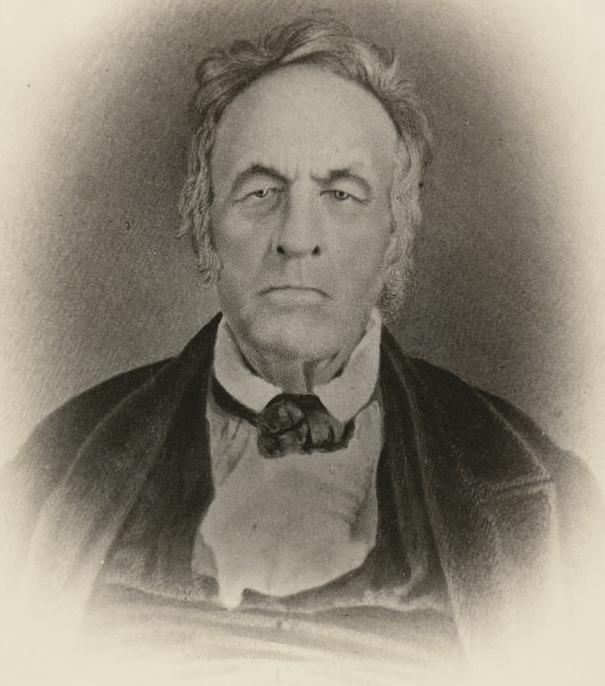
Nominee	William A. Palmer	Heman Allen	Ezra Meech
Party	Anti-Masonic	National Republican	Jacksonian
Electoral vote	114	36	42
Popular vote	15,258	12,290	6,158
Percentage	44.91%	36.17%	18.12%
- County results Palmer: 40–50% 60–70% 70–80% Allen: 40–50% 60–70% Meech: 30–40%
Governor before election
Samuel C. Crafts
National Republican
Elected Governor
William A. Palmer
Anti-Masonic

The 1831 Vermont gubernatorial election took place on September 6, 1831. It resulted in the election of William A. Palmer to a one-year term as governor.

In the mid-to-late 1820s, the old Democratic-Republican Party continued to splinter into adherents of Andrew Jackson (the Jacksonian or Democratic Party) and those of John Quincy Adams and Henry Clay (the National Republican Party, soon to be called the Whig Party). The Anti-Masonic Party, which had formed in the late 1820s, continued to attract adherents, and was especially strong in Vermont.

The candidates for governor in 1831 were: Anti-Mason William A. Palmer; Heman Allen (of Colchester), the nominee of the Clay Masonic or National Republican Party; and Jacksonian Ezra Meech. In the general election, the General Assembly determined that the results were: total votes, 33,976; Palmer, 15,258 (44.9%); Allen, 12,290 (36.2%); Meech, 6,158 (18.1%); scattering, 270 (0.8%).

Because no candidate received a majority as required by the Vermont Constitution, the General Assembly was required to select. With 227 members voting on the 9th ballot, 114 votes were necessary for a choice. Palmer, who had consistently attained 110 or more votes on the previous eight ballots, received 114 votes. Allen received 36, Meech 42, and incumbent governor Samuel C. Crafts, a National Republican, received 35.

In the race for lieutenant governor, the total votes were 34,099. Anti-Mason Lebbeus Egerton received 15,190 votes (44.5%), Jedediah Harris, a National Republican, received 12,736 (37.3%), Jacksonian John Roberts received 6,127 (18.0%), and 46 (0.2%) were recorded as scattering. The General Assembly was required to choose and with 209 members voting on the first ballot, 105 votes were necessary for a choice. Egerton was elected with 110 votes to 60 for Harris, 40 for Roberts, and 9 scattering.

Benjamin Swan won election to a one-year term as treasurer, his thirty-second. Though he had nominally been a Federalist, Swan was usually endorsed by the Democratic-Republicans and even after the demise of the Federalist Party he was frequently unopposed. In 1831, he was the candidate of both the Jacksonians and the National Republicans and Augustine Clarke was the Anti-Masonic candidate. The popular vote was reported as: total votes cast, 33,362; Swan, 19,118 (57.3%); Clarke, 14,204 (42.6%); scattering, 39 (0.1%).

== Results ==
1831 Vermont gubernatorial election
Party	Candidate	Votes	%
Anti-Masonic	William A. Palmer	15,258	44.91
National Republican	Heman Allen	12,290	36.17
Jacksonian	Ezra Meech	6,158	18.12
Write-in		270	0.80
Total votes		33,976	100.0
