= Samuel C. Crafts =

American politician (1768–1853)

Samuel Chandler Crafts
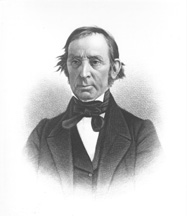

United States Senator from Vermont
- In office April 23, 1842 – March 3, 1843
- Preceded by: Samuel Prentiss
- Succeeded by: William Upham

12th Governor of Vermont
- In office October 10, 1828 – October 18, 1831
- Lieutenant: Henry Olin; Mark Richards
- Preceded by: Ezra Butler
- Succeeded by: William A. Palmer

Member of the U.S. House of Representatives from Vermont
- In office March 4, 1817 – March 4, 1825
- Preceded by: Charles Marsh
- Succeeded by: John Mattocks
- Constituency: At-large district (1817-21); 5th district (1821-25)

Member of the Vermont House of Representatives
- In office 1796; 1800–1803; 1805

Personal details
- Born: October 6, 1768 Woodstock, Colony of Connecticut, British America
- Died: November 19, 1853 (aged 85) Craftsbury, Vermont, U.S.
- Party: Democratic-Republican, National Republican, Whig
- Spouse: Eunice Wood Crafts
- Profession: Politician, judge

Samuel Chandler Crafts (October 6, 1768 – November 19, 1853) was a United States representative, senator and the 12th governor of Vermont.

== Early life ==
Born in Woodstock in the Colony of Connecticut, Crafts graduated from Harvard College in 1790 and moved to Vermont with his parents Mehitible Chandler (sister of the painter Winthrop Chandler), and Ebenezer Crafts, who founded the town of Craftsbury by settling there in 1791. He married Eunice Todd Beardsley and the couple had two children.

== Career ==
Crafts was town clerk from 1799 to 1829 and was a delegate to the Vermont Constitutional convention in 1793 where he was the youngest member. He was a member of the Vermont House of Representatives in 1796, 1800–1803, and 1805, and was clerk of the house in 1798–1799. He was register of probate from 1796 to 1815 and was assistant judge of the Orleans County Court from 1800 to 1810 and 1825 to 1828.

Crafts made an extensive botanical reconnaissance of the Mississippi Valley in 1802. He was a member of the State Council of Censors from 1809 to 1813. This Council consisted of twelve men and shared executive power with the Governor. He was Chief Judge of the Orleans County Court from 1810 to 1816. Crafts was elected to the Fifteenth and to the three succeeding Congresses, serving from March 4, 1817, to March 3, 1825. He again served as a member of the governor's council in 1825 and 1826.

Crafts was Governor of Vermont from 1828 to 1831. When he was a member of the Vermont constitutional convention of 1829, he served as its president. Crafts was clerk of Orleans County from 1836 to 1839. In 1842 he was appointed to the U.S. Senate seat vacated by the resignation of Samuel Prentiss. On October 26, 1842, he was elected to complete the remainder of Prentiss's term. Crafts served in the Senate from April 23, 1842, to March 3, 1843. He was not a candidate for a full term, and was succeeded by William Upham.

== Death ==
Samuel Crafts retired to his farm in Craftsbury where he died in 1853. He is interred at North Craftsbury Cemetery, North Craftsbury.

Party political offices
| First | National Republican nominee for Lieutenant Governor of Vermont; 1827 | Succeeded by Henry Olin |
| Preceded by Ezra Butler | National Republican nominee for Governor of Vermont; 1828, 1829, 1830 | Succeeded by Heman Allen |
| Preceded by Heman Allen | National Republican nominee for Governor of Vermont; 1832 | Succeeded by None |
U.S. House of Representatives
| Preceded by Daniel Chipman; Luther Jewett; Chauncey Langdon; Asa Lyon; Charles Marsh; John Noyes | Member of the U.S. House of Representatives from Vermont's at-large congressional district March 4, 1817 – March 3, 1821; Served alongside: Heman Allen, William Hunter, Orsamus C. Merrill, Charles Rich, Mark Richards, Ezra Meech, Rollin C. Mallary and William Strong | Succeeded by (none) |
| Preceded by (none) | Member of the U.S. House of Representatives from Vermont's 5th congressional district March 4, 1821 – March 3, 1825 | Succeeded by John Mattocks |
Political offices
| Preceded by Ezra Butler | Governor of Vermont; 1828–1831 | Succeeded by William A. Palmer |
U.S. Senate
| Preceded by Samuel Prentiss | U.S. senator (Class 3) from Vermont; April 23, 1842 – March 3, 1843; Served alongside: Samuel S. Phelps | Succeeded by William Upham |
Honorary titles
| Preceded by Elisha Mathewson | Oldest living U.S. senator October 14, 1853 – November 19, 1853 | Succeeded by Jonathan Roberts |
