= 1833 Vermont gubernatorial election =

- September 3, 1833
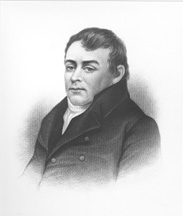

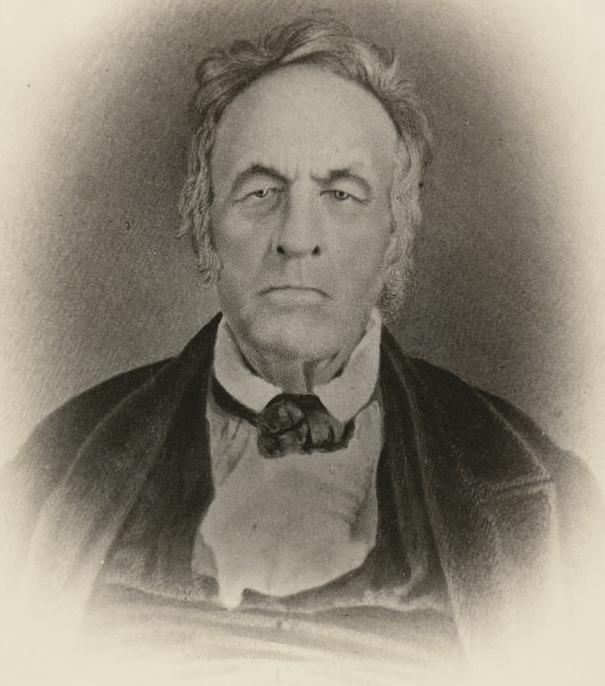
Nominee	William A. Palmer	Ezra Meech
Party	Anti-Masonic	Union
Alliance		Democratic; National Republican
Popular vote	20,565	15,683
Percentage	52.86%	40.31%
- County results Palmer: 50–60% 60–70% 70–80% Meech: 40–50% 50–60%
Governor before election
William A. Palmer
Anti-Masonic
Elected Governor
William A. Palmer
Anti-Masonic

The 1833 Vermont gubernatorial election took place in September and October, and resulted in the reelection of William A. Palmer to a one-year term as governor.

== Governor ==
The candidates for governor in the general election held on September 3, 1833, were: incumbent William A. Palmer (Anti-Masonic); Ezra Meech (Democrat and National Republican); Horatio Seymour (Independent National Republican); and John Roberts (Independent Democrat). In the general election, the General Assembly, which met in Montpelier on October 10, determined that the results were: total votes, 38,905; Palmer, 20,565 (52.9%); Meech, 15,683 (40.3%); Seymour, 1,765 (4.5%); Roberts, 772 (1.9%); scattering, 120 (0.4%).

== Lieutenant governor ==
In the race for lieutenant governor, the total votes were 38,937. Anti-Mason and incumbent Lebbeus Egerton received 20,185 votes (51.8%), Jedediah Harris, running as a Democrat and National Republican, received 18,725 (48.1%), and 27 (0.1%) were recorded as scattering.

== Treasurer ==
After 33 consecutive one-year terms, Benjamin Swan lost the election for state treasurer. Though he had nominally been a Federalist, Swan was later the usual candidate of the Democratic-Republicans and in many of his campaigns he had run unopposed. In 1833, he was the candidate of the National Republicans and Democrats, and Augustine Clarke was the Anti-Masonic candidate. The popular vote was reported as: total votes cast, 38,724: Clarke, 19,661 (50.77%); Swan, 19,056 (49.20%); scattering, 7 (0.03%).

== Results ==
1833 Vermont gubernatorial election
Party	Candidate	Votes	%	±%
Anti-Masonic	William A. Palmer (Inc.)	20,565	52.86	
Union	Ezra Meech	15,683	40.31	
Independent National Republican	Horatio Seymour	1,765	4.54	
Independent Democratic	John Roberts	772	1.98	
Write-in		120	0.31	
Total votes		38,905	100.0	
