= 1832 Vermont gubernatorial election =

- September 4, 1832
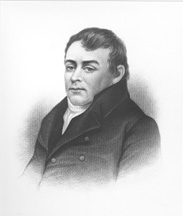

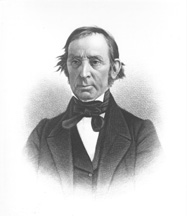

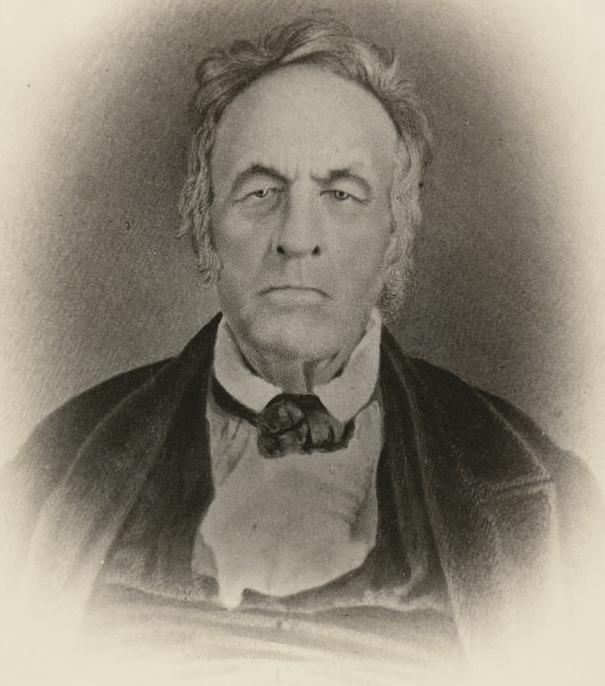
Nominee	William A. Palmer	Samuel C. Crafts	Ezra Meech
Party	Anti-Masonic	National Republican	Democratic
Electoral vote	112	72	37
Popular vote	17,318	15,499	8,210
Percentage	42.21%	37.78%	20.01%
- County results Palmer: 30–40% 40–50% 60–70% 70–80% Crafts: 30–40% 40–50% 60–70% Meech: 30–40%
Governor before election
William A. Palmer
Anti-Masonic
Elected Governor
William A. Palmer
Anti-Masonic

The 1832 Vermont gubernatorial election took place on September 4, 1832. It resulted in the election of William A. Palmer to a one-year term as governor.

The candidates for governor in 1832 were: incumbent William A. Palmer (Anti-Masonic); former Governor Samuel C. Crafts (National Republican); and Democrat Ezra Meech. In the general election, the General Assembly, which met in Montpelier on October 11, determined that the results were: total votes, 41,027; Palmer, 17,318 (42.2%); Crafts, 15,499 (37.8%); Meech, 8,210 (20.0%).

Because no candidate received a majority as required by the Vermont Constitution, the General Assembly was required to select. Over 42 ballots, 223 members cast ballots, meaning 112 were required for a choice. Palmer consistently led the balloting with more than 100 votes, and attained as many as 111. On the 43rd ballot, 222 members cast ballots, meaning 111 were required for a choice. One Crafts supporter did not vote and one voted for Palmer, who was elected with 112 votes to 72 for Crafts, 37 for Meech, and 1 recorded as scattering.

In the race for lieutenant governor, the total votes were 40,914. Anti-Mason and incumbent Lebbeus Egerton received 17,181 votes (42.0%), Jedediah Harris, a National Republican, received 15,304 (37.4%), and Democrat John Roberts received 8,429 (20.6%). The General Assembly was required to choose and with 219 members voting on the first ballot, 110 votes were necessary for a choice. Egerton was elected with 111 votes to 66 for Harris, 40 for Roberts, and 2 scattering.

Benjamin Swan won election to a one-year term as treasurer, his thirty-third. Though he had nominally been a Federalist, Swan was usually endorsed by the Democratic-Republicans and even after the demise of the Federalist Party he was frequently unopposed. In 1832, he was the candidate of the National Republicans and Democrats, and Augustine Clarke was the Anti-Masonic candidate. The popular vote was reported as: total votes cast, 40,389; Swan, 23,687 (58.6%); Clarke, 16,702 (41.4%).

== Results ==
1832 Vermont gubernatorial election
Party	Candidate	Votes	%	±%
Anti-Masonic	William A. Palmer (Inc.)	17,318	42.21	
National Republican	Samuel C. Crafts	15,499	37.78	
Democratic	Ezra Meech	8,210	20.01	
Total votes		41,027	100.0	
