= Charles Rich (politician) =

American lawyer and politician

Member of the U.S. House of Representatives from Vermont
- In office March 4, 1813 – March 4, 1815
- Preceded by: Martin Chittenden
- Succeeded by: Asa Lyon
- Constituency: At-large district
- In office March 4, 1817 – October 15, 1824
- Preceded by: Chauncey Langdon
- Succeeded by: Henry Olin
- Constituency: At-large district (1817-21); 3rd district (1821-24)

Personal details
- Born: September 13, 1771 Warwick, Province of Massachusetts Bay, British America
- Died: October 15, 1824 (aged 53) Shoreham, Vermont, U.S.
- Party: Democratic-Republican
- Spouse: Molly Watts
- Relations: John T. Rich (grandson); John Dewey (great-grandson); Davis Dewey (great-grandson)
- Children: 11
- Profession: Farmer

Charles Rich (September 13, 1771 – October 15, 1824) was an American lawyer and politician. He served as a Democratic-Republican United States representative from Vermont.

== Biography ==
Rich was born in Warwick in the Province of Massachusetts Bay to Thomas Rich and Millicent Conant. He received a limited education. He moved to Shoreham in the Vermont Republic in 1787, and worked on the family farm. He served as a member of the Vermont House of Representatives from 1800 to 1811. He was a county judge in Addison County, Vermont for six years.

Rich was elected as a Democratic-Republican to the 13th United States Congress, serving from March 4, 1813, to March 3, 1815. He was elected to the 15th United States Congress, 16th United States Congress, 17th United States Congress and the 18th United States Congress, serving from March 4, 1817, until his death on October 15, 1824. Rich died in Shoreham, Vermont, and is interred in the family vault on his farm there.

== Family life ==
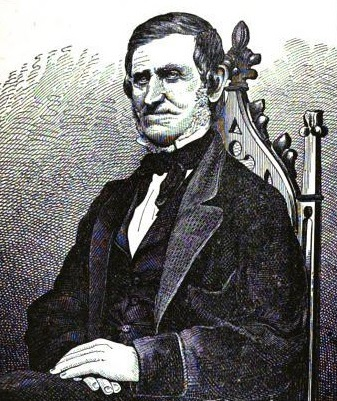
Charles Rich (1802-1872), Sheep rancher and Michigan politician and judge.

Rich married Molly Watts in 1791, and they had the following children:

- Clark Rich, b. March 17, 1792, Shoreham, Addison, Vt.
- Davis Rich, b. February 17, 1794, Shoreham, Addison, Vt., d. March 23, 1879, Shoreham, Addison, Vt.
- Polly Rich, b. June 15, 1796, Shoreham, Addison, Vt.
- Hiram Rich, b. September 15, 1798, Shoreham, Addison, Vt., d. March 2, 1859, Brandon, VT.
- John Thurman Rich, b. October 12, 1800, Shoreham, Addison, Vt, d. October 12, 1846, Shoreham, Addison, Vt.
- Charles Rich, b. July 30, 1802, Shoreham, Addison, Vt., d. July 16, 1872, Lapeer, Mi.
- Quintus Cincinnatus Rich, b. September 18, 1804, Shoreham, Addison, Vt., d. November 4, 1879, Shoreham, Addison, Vt.
- Clarissa Rich, b. 1806, Shoreham, Addison, Vt.
- Virtulon Rich, b. 1809, Shoreham, Addison, Vt, d. May 10, 1891, Shoreham, Addison, Vt.
- Gasca Rich, b. October 13, 1811, Shoreham, Addison, Vt., d. December 18, 1894, Shoreham, Addison, Vt.
- Catherine Rich, b. 1813, Shoreham, Addison, Vt.

Charles Rich Jr. served on the Michigan Board of Agriculture, as a county court judge, and in other offices.

John W. Rich's son John T. Rich, was a United States representative from Michigan and the 23rd governor of Michigan.

Davis Rich fathered Lucina Artemesia Rich who married Archibald Dewey of Burlington, Vt. Their sons included the famous philosopher and educator John Dewey and the MIT economics professor Davis Dewey.

== See also ==
- List of members of the United States Congress who died in office (1790–1899)

U.S. House of Representatives
Preceded by Seat created	Member of the U.S. House of Representatives from Vermont's at-large congressional district 1813-1815	Succeeded by Asa Lyon
Preceded by Chauncey Langdon	Member of the U.S. House of Representatives from Vermont's at-large congressional district 1817-1821	Succeeded by Henry Olin
Preceded by Chauncey Langdon	Member of the U.S. House of Representatives from Vermont's 3rd congressional district 1821-1824	Succeeded by Henry Olin
