= Dudley Chase =

American judge and senator (1771-1846)

United States Senator from Vermont
- In office March 4, 1825 – March 3, 1831
- Preceded by: William A. Palmer
- Succeeded by: Samuel Prentiss
- In office March 4, 1813 – November 3, 1817
- Preceded by: Stephen R. Bradley
- Succeeded by: James Fisk

Chief Justice of the Vermont Supreme Court
- In office 1817–1820
- Preceded by: Richard Skinner
- Succeeded by: Cornelius P. Van Ness

Speaker of the Vermont House of Representatives
- In office 1808–1813
- Preceded by: Aaron Leland
- Succeeded by: Daniel Chipman

Member of the Vermont House of Representatives from Randolph
- In office 1823–1825
- Preceded by: Shubael Converse
- Succeeded by: Lebbeus Egerton
- In office 1805–1813
- Preceded by: James Tarbox
- Succeeded by: James Tarbox

State's Attorney of Orange County, Vermont
- In office 1803–1812
- Preceded by: Charles Bulkley
- Succeeded by: Elisha Hotchkiss

Personal details
- Born: December 30, 1771 Cornish, New Hampshire
- Died: February 23, 1846 (aged 74) Randolph Center, Vermont, US
- Party: Democratic-Republican, National Republican
- Spouse: Olivia Brown (m. 1796)
- Relations: Philander Chase (brother); Salmon P. Chase (nephew); Dudley Chase Denison (nephew)
- Education: Dartmouth College
- Profession: Attorney

Dudley Chase (December 30, 1771 – February 23, 1846) was a U.S. Senator from Vermont who served from 1813 to 1817 and again from 1825 to 1831. He was born in Cornish, New Hampshire.

== Career ==
After graduating from Dartmouth College in 1791, he studied law under Lot Hall in Westminster, Vermont. In 1793, he was admitted to the Vermont bar.

Chase lived, farmed, and practiced law in Randolph, Vermont. He was Orange County State's Attorney from 1803 to 1812. He was a member of the Vermont House of Representatives from 1805 to 1812, serving as Speaker from 1808 to 1812. He was elected to the state constitutional conventions in 1814 and 1822.

Chase was elected to the U.S. Senate as a Democratic-Republican in 1812 and served from 1813 to 1817, when he resigned. He was the first ever Chairman of the United States Senate Committee on the Judiciary, serving from 1816 to 1817.

After resigning in 1817, he returned to Vermont, where he was chief justice of the Vermont Supreme Court until 1821. He served as a member of the Vermont House of Representatives from 1823 to 1824.

He returned to national politics in 1825 when he was elected as an Anti-Jacksonian to the U.S. Senate, serving until 1831.

Dudley Chase died in Randolph on February 23, 1846.

== Family ==
Dudley Chase was the son of Dudley & Alice (Corbett) Chase, an uncle of Salmon P. Chase (Treasury Secretary, 1861–1864 and Chief Justice of the United States, 1864–1873) and Dudley Chase Denison (a U.S. Representative from Vermont). He was the brother of Philander Chase.

== Home ==
Dudley Chase's Randolph Center home still stands and is a private residence.

== Attempts to locate portrait ==
Chase is one of between 40 and 50 U.S. Senators for whom the Senate historian has no portrait, photograph, or other likeness on file. According to Randolph historian and Chase descendant Harriet M. Chase, no portrait of Dudley Chase was ever painted. Other efforts to locate a likeness of Dudley Chase have also proved unsuccessful.

== External resources ==
- United States Congress. "Dudley Chase (id: C000325)". Biographical Directory of the United States Congress.
- Dartmouth Alumni Bio from 1867

Party political offices
Preceded by Richard Skinner	Anti-Jacksonian nominee for Governor of Vermont; 1823	Succeeded by None
Political offices
Preceded by Aaron Leland	Speaker of the Vermont House of Representatives; 1808–1813	Succeeded by Daniel Chipman
U.S. Senate
Preceded by Stephen R. Bradley	U.S. senator (Class 3) from Vermont; 1813–1817; Served alongside: Jonathan Robinson, Isaac Tichenor	Succeeded by James Fisk
Preceded by William A. Palmer	U.S. senator (Class 3) from Vermont; 1825–1831; Served alongside: Horatio Seymour	Succeeded by Samuel Prentiss
