= Horatio Seymour (Erie County, New York) =

American politician

Horatio Seymour (1813 Middlebury, Addison County, Vermont – September 1872) was an American lawyer and politician from New York.

== Life ==
He was the son of U.S. Senator Horatio Seymour (1778–1857) and Lucy (Case) Seymour. He graduated from Middlebury College, studied law in Syracuse, New York, was admitted to the bar, and commenced practice in Buffalo, New York in 1836. He married Elizabeth Staats (1816–1876), and they had two sons.

He was a member of the New York State Assembly (Erie Co., 2nd D.) in 1862 and 1863. He was the Democratic minority candidate for Speaker in 1862. He was Surrogate of Erie County from 1868 until his death.

Governor Horatio Seymour (1810–1886) and Congressman Origen S. Seymour (1804–1881) were his first cousins; State Senator Henry Seymour (1780–1837) was his uncle.

== Sources ==
- The New York Civil List compiled by Franklin Benjamin Hough, Stephen C. Hutchins and Edgar Albert Werner (1867; pg. 442f)
- Biographical Sketches of the State Officers and Members of the Legislature of the State of New York in 1862 and '63 by William D. Murray (pg. 396f)
- The Seymour Family papers at the Litchfield Historical Society
- Manual for the Use of the Legislature (1868; pg. 226)

New York State Assembly
Preceded by Victor M. Rice	New York State Assembly; Erie County, 2nd District; 1862–1863	Succeeded by Frederick P. Stevens
