= William Hunter (Vermont politician) =

American politician

Member of the United States House of Representatives from Vermont's at-large district
- In office March 4, 1817 – March 3, 1819
- Preceded by: John Noyes
- Succeeded by: Ezra Meech

Member of the Vermont House of Representatives
- In office 1795; 1807; 1808

Personal details
- Born: January 3, 1754 Sharon, Connecticut Colony, British America
- Died: November 30, 1827 (aged 73) Windsor, Vermont, U.S.
- Party: Democratic-Republican
- Spouse: Mary Newell Hunter
- Children: 3
- Profession: Politician, Judge

William Hunter (January 3, 1754 – November 30, 1827) was an American judge and politician. He served as a U.S. representative from Vermont.

== Biography ==
Hunter was born in Sharon in the Connecticut Colony to Rebecca Marvin and David Hunter. He attended the common schools. He resided near Ford Edward in the Province of New York from 1763 until 1775, when he moved to Windsor. He joined a Vermont militia company commanded by Captain John Grout and served in the Revolutionary War as an orderly sergeant and lieutenant, and took part in General Richard Montgomery's expedition to Canada.

He served as a member of the Vermont House of Representatives in 1795, 1807, and 1808. He was the register of probate from 1798 until 1801, and judge of probate for the district of Windsor from 1801 until 1816. He also served as Justice of the Peace in Windsor. He was a Presidential Elector for Vermont in 1804, and voted for the reelection of Thomas Jefferson as president and new running mate George Clinton as vice president.

Hunter was an assistant judge of the Windsor County, Vermont court from 1805 until 1816, and was a member of the Vermont Council of Censors in 1806 and 1820. He was a member of the Vermont Executive Council from 1810 until 1813 and in 1815.

Hunter was elected as a Democratic-Republican candidate to the Fifteenth Congress, serving from March 4, 1817, until March 3, 1819. He was not a candidate for reelection to the Sixteenth Congress.

== Personal life ==
Hunter was married to Mary Newell Hunter on January 30, 1777. They had three children together, all who died very young.

== Death ==
Hunter died in Windsor, Vermont on November 30, 1827. He is interred at Sheddsville Cemetery in West Windsor.

U.S. House of Representatives
Preceded by John Noyes	Member of the U.S. House of Representatives from Vermont's at-large congressional district 1817-1819	Succeeded by Ezra Meech
