= Ascutney Mill Dam =

Windsor Upper Dam
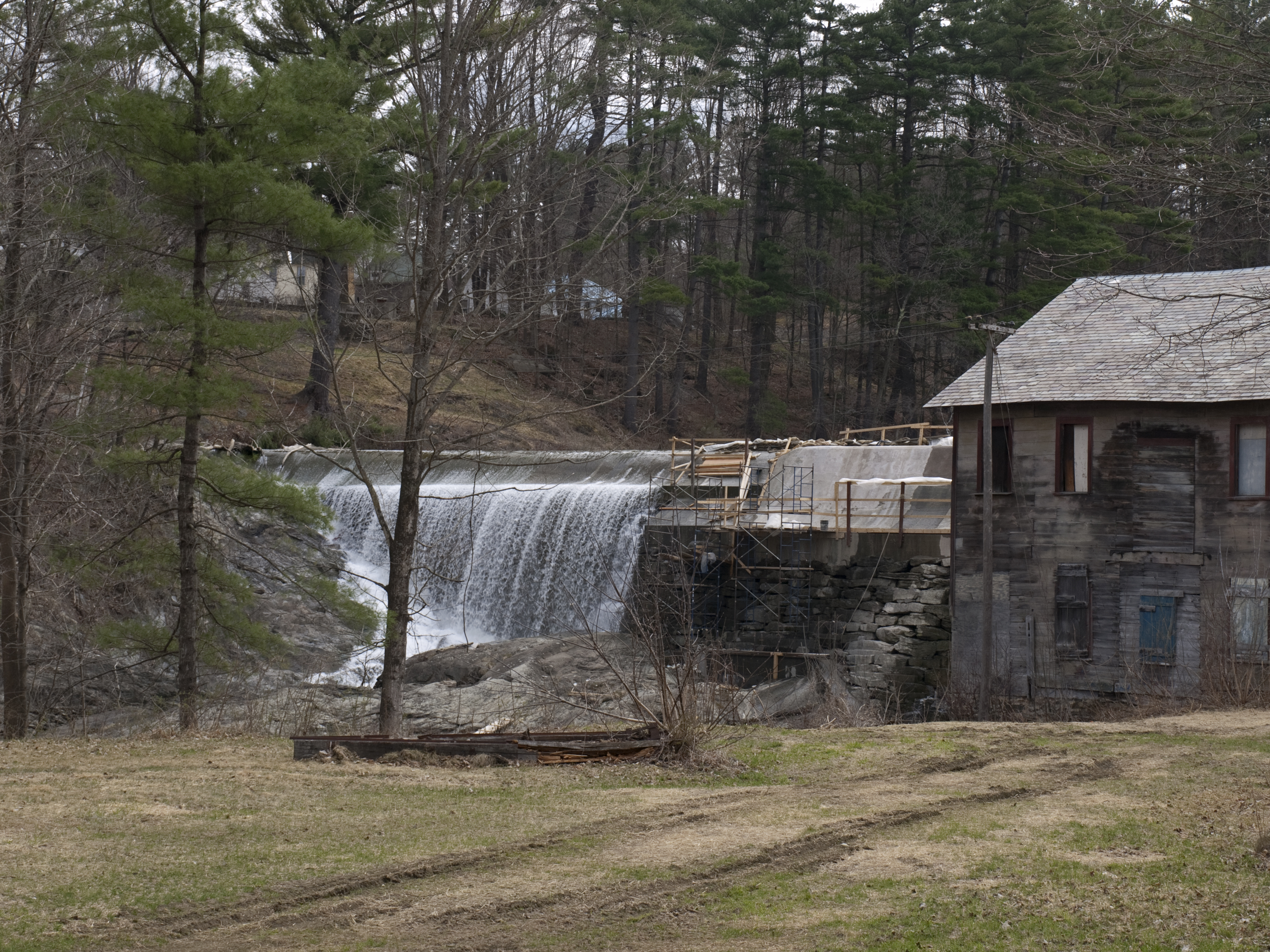
- Windsor Upper Dam
- Interactive map of Windsor Upper Dam
- Location: Windsor, Vermont
- Coordinates: 43°28′36″N 72°23′46″W
- Construction began: June 1834
- Opening date: November 1834
- Operator: Ascutney Mill Dam Company

Dam and spillways
- Impounds: Mill Brook
- Height: 40 ft (12 m)
- Length: 250 ft (76 m)
- Width (base): 36 ft (11 m)
- Ascutney Mill Dam Historic District
- U.S. National Register of Historic Places
- U.S. Historic district
- Location within Vermont Location within the United States
- Location: 55 and 57 Ascutney St., Windsor, Vermont
- Area: 4.8 acres (1.9 ha)
- Built: 1783
- Architect: Simeon Cobb
- Architectural style: Federal-Greek Revival
- NRHP reference No.: 06001236
- Added to NRHP: January 9, 2007

Ascutney Mill Dam, also known as the Windsor Upper Dam and the Mill Pond Dam, is an arch-gravity dam which is one of the oldest and among the earliest storage dams in the United States. It is made of cut granite and is located in Windsor, Vermont in Windsor County near the Connecticut River, where it functioned as a source of hydropower and, later, hydroelectric power. It is on the ASCE list of historic civil engineering landmarks since 1970 and is listed on the National Register of Historic Places (as Ascutney Mill Dam Historic District) since January 09, 2007.

The dam is built in the valley of the Mill Brook, a right tributary of the Connecticut River. The pond above the dam is known as the Mill Pond.

The Ascutney Mill Dam Company was formed to build the dam. Construction began in June 1834, and was finished in November. The purpose of the dam was to regulate seasonal water flow and provide hydropower for nearby sawmills and gristmills, which previously could not operate during periods of low water flow in Mill Brook. The dam allowed water to be stored in the impound during the winter for release during lower flow seasons.

Ithamar A. Beard was a New England engineer who surveyed the area and selected the site for the dam. Simeon Cobb and Joseph Mason were the contractors in charge of building the dam.

== Background ==
=== History and planning ===
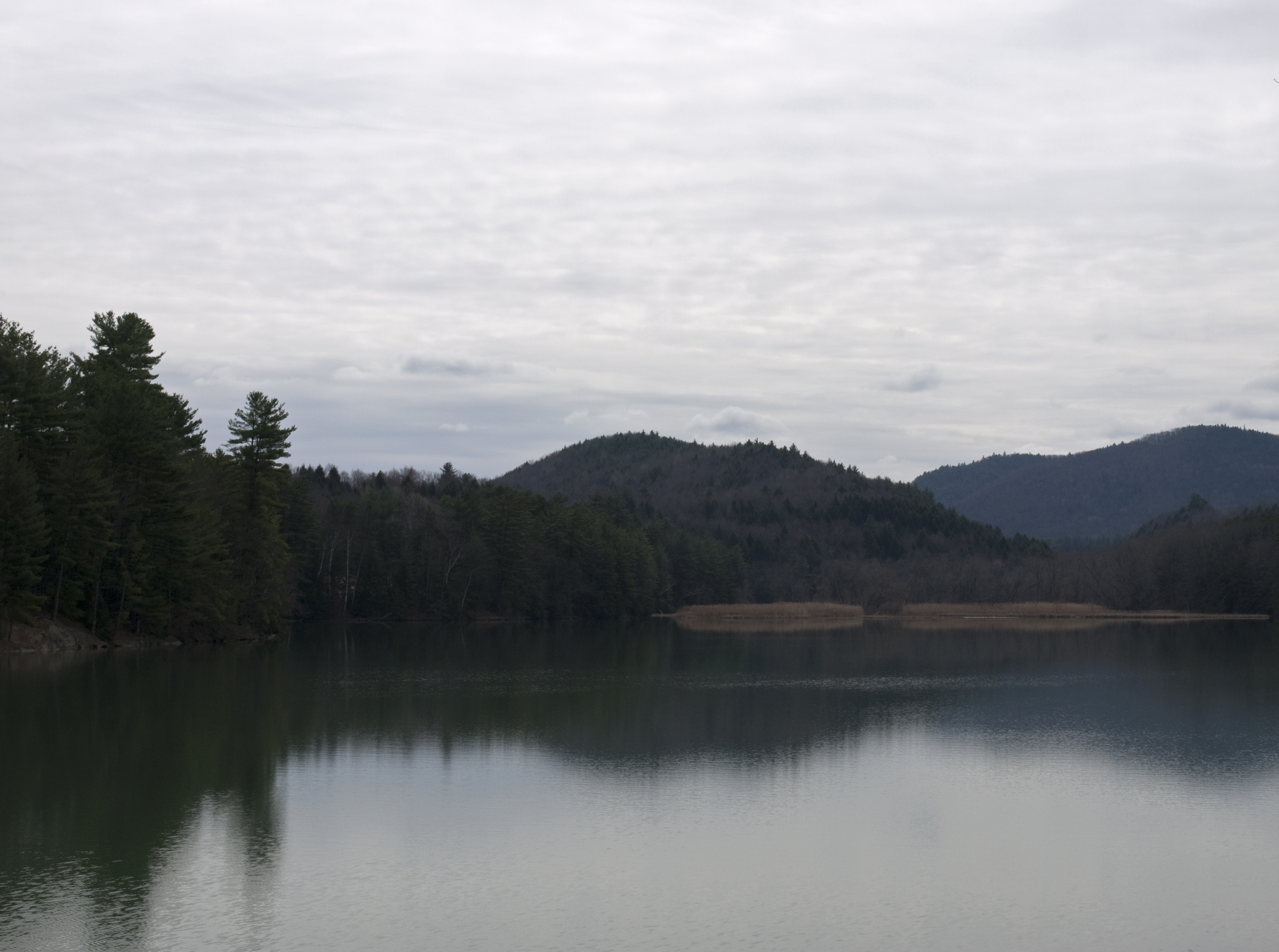
The Mill Pond

As early as 1767, several sawmills and gristmills were operating along the banks of Mill Brook in Windsor. However, during periods of low water flow the mills stood idle. Like many early towns, their location was often selected on the availability of such a resource. Water-powered mills have been used to save human labor since ancient times, but like all renewable energy resources, their power is not always available when needed. Sawmills were needed to provide boards for construction, and gristmills were necessary to ground grain into flour. In post-colonial Vermont, these mills were essential for the building and food supply needs of the growing cities.

The Ascutney Mill Dam Company was formed in 1833 to build the dam; it was the owner and was responsible for the dam's maintenance and operation. Despite problems during the financial panic of 1837, the company continued to operate the dam throughout the 19th century. Ithamar A. Beard was the engineer who surveyed the area and made the suggestion for the dam site.

The dam was constructed from mid-April 1834 to mid-November 1834. It was built of cut granite and was one of the first gravity-arch dams built in the United States. It is possibly the oldest masonry dam in the U.S. of any significant size. The original dam had a near-vertical downstream face built in an arch form.

Water filled up behind the dam each winter and was allowed to flow over the spillway the following spring. Water and ice falling over the crest and 40 feet (12 m) to the ledge below caused noise and vibrations throughout the village which concerned citizens. Inspections found that the vibrations caused no damage to the dam, but a stone buttress was built below the dam to stop the vibrations.

=== Construction ===
Construction began in April 1834. Simeon Cobb and Joseph Mason were the contractors in charge of building the dam, and Allen Wardner, a prominent Windsor businessman and banker, superintended the work. The first step was to remove a small dam on the site. In June the first granite blocks were placed. The granite was obtained from nearby quarries. The overall construction was fairly simple and finished in November 1834, just seven months after construction began. The finished product was a 40 ft (12 m) high and 76.25 ft (23.24 m) long dam. The elevation above mean sea level is 115 ft (35 m).

== Condition ==
The National Program for Inspection of Non-Federal Dams performed an inspection of the dam in September 1978. The report was a Phase I inspection report from the Corps of engineers in Waltham, Massachusetts, New England division. The abstract of the report writes:

"The dam is considered to be in fair condition. The dam is believed to be safe under normal operating conditions. The test flood is the PMF. It is recommended that the owner engage the services of a qualified consultant to evaluate the stability of the dam. In addition to long term recommendations, there are several remedial measures which should be implemented."

The current policy of the state of Vermont Department of Environmental Conservation requires that only dams that are capable of impounding more than 500,000 cubic feet (14,000 m^{3}) need to be inspected. The Upper Windsor Dam does not fall within this category.

In the twentieth century, a concrete coping was placed on top of the structure to help ensure its stability in times of flood. The dam retains much of its original structure even though it is one of the oldest dams in the United States.

== Topographic information ==
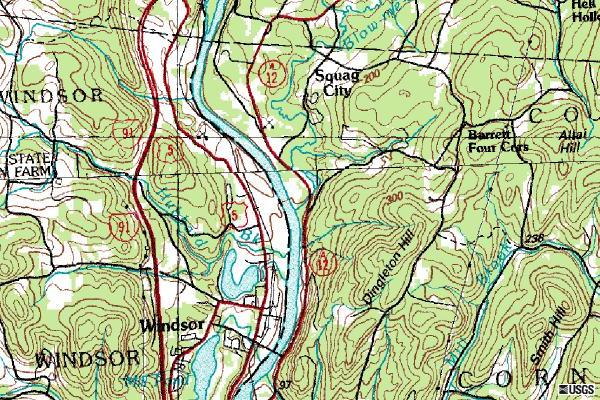
Topographic Map of Windsor, Vermont

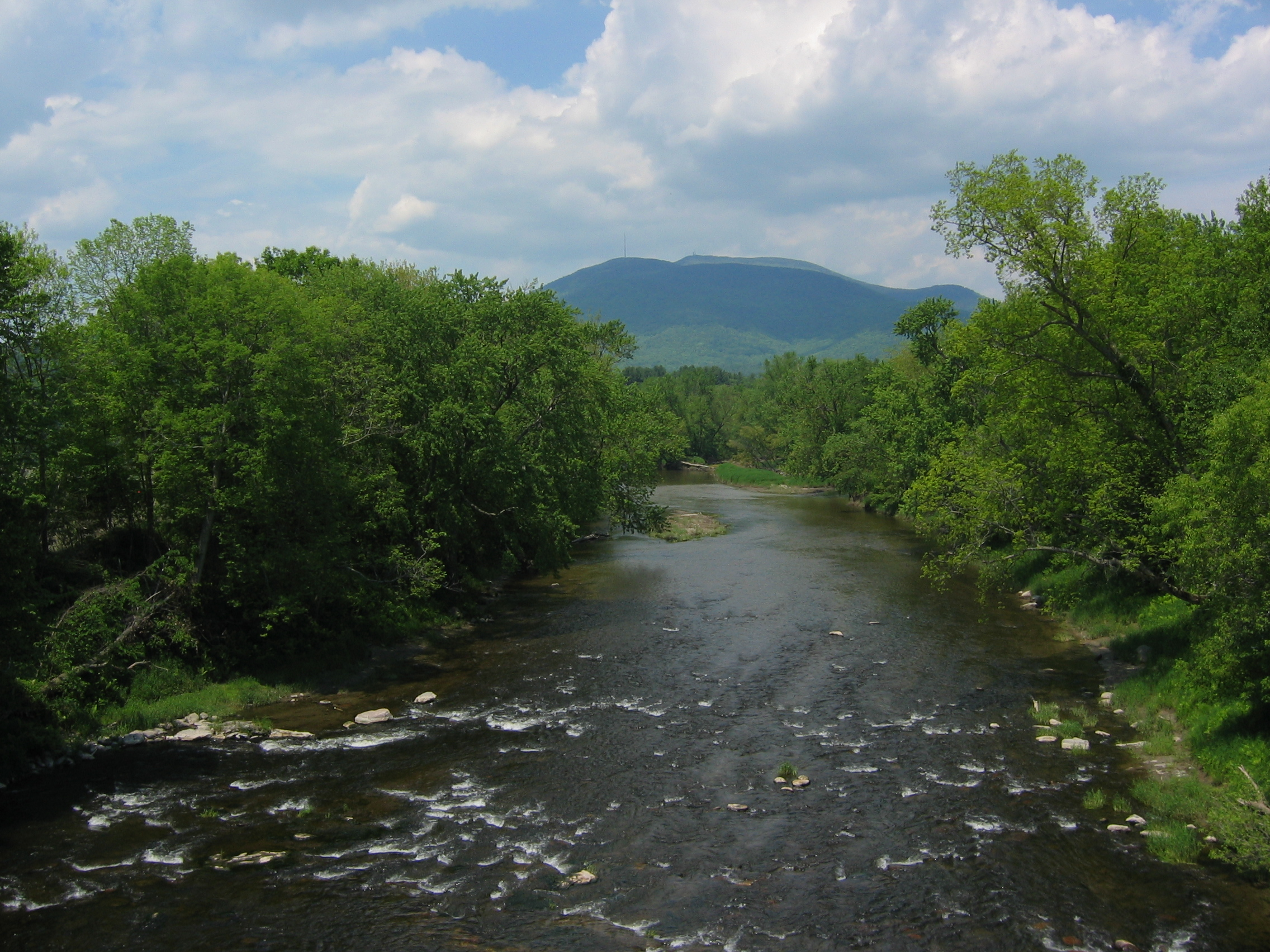
Ascutney

For the United States Geological Survey (USGS), the dam is sourced in the Windsor Windsor quad. The topographic map shows the mountainous terrain of the area. In fact, Windsor County, Vermont is home to a total of 202 mountain summits and peaks. The highest is Gillespie Peak which is at an elevation of 3,343 ft (1,019 m) above sea level. The peak flow in the rivers near uneven terrain could fluctuate vastly between periods of high and low precipitation because much of the rainfall flows down to a discharge rather than infiltrating into the ground as it would in flat terrain. This flow could cause a large increase in flow rate and river height in a fairly small amount of time. The fact that the Connecticut River was just a few miles away also played a role in this. Because of all this, the timing of opening and closing the dam to regulate flow and produce hydroelectric power was important.

== Nearby areas ==
Nearby Cities and Towns	Distance
Windsor, VT	<.1 mile
Cornish Mills, NH	1.4 miles (2.3 km) ESE
Cornish City, NH	2.4 miles (3.9 km) ESE
Squag City, NH	3.1 miles (5.0 km) NNE
Balloch, NH	3.1 miles (5.0 km) S
Cornish Center, NH	3.9 miles (6.3 km) E
Brownsville, VT	3.9 miles (6.3 km) W
Hartland, VT	4.3 miles (6.9 km) N
Plainfield, NH	4.5 miles (7.2 km) NNE
South Cornish, NH	4.7 miles (7.6 km) ESE

== Fishing ==
The Windsor Upper Dam area is a popular fishing spot, both fly fishing and baitcasting. Local fish include bluegill, brook trout and rock bass. Fishing is open to the public but a Vermont fishing license is required.
