= Horatio Seymour (Vermont politician) =

United States Senator from Vermont

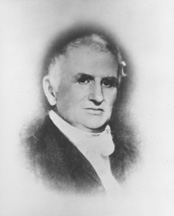

United States Senator from Vermont
- In office March 4, 1821 – March 3, 1833
- Preceded by: Isaac Tichenor
- Succeeded by: Benjamin Swift

Probate Judge of Addison County, Vermont
- In office 1847–1856
- Preceded by: Silas H. Jennison
- Succeeded by: Calvin G. Tilden

State's Attorney of Addison County, Vermont
- In office 1815–1818
- Preceded by: David Edmond
- Succeeded by: David Edmond
- In office 1810–1813
- Preceded by: David Edmond
- Succeeded by: David Edmond

Member of the Vermont Governor's Council
- In office 1809–1814

Personal details
- Born: May 31, 1778 Litchfield, Connecticut, U.S.
- Died: November 21, 1857 (aged 79) Middlebury, Vermont, U.S.
- Party: Democratic-Republican; National Republican; Whig
- Spouse: Lucy Case Seymour
- Children: 6 (including Horatio Seymour Jr.)
- Education: Yale College; Litchfield Law School
- Profession: Attorney
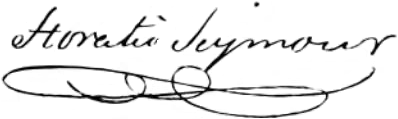
- Signature

Horatio Seymour (May 31, 1778 – November 21, 1857) was a United States senator from Vermont. He was the uncle of Origen S. Seymour and the great-uncle of Origen's son Edward W. Seymour.

Horatio Seymour's brother Henry became a resident of Utica, New York and was the father of Horatio Seymour, who served as Governor of New York, and of Julia Catherine Seymour, the wife of Senator Roscoe Conkling.

== Early life ==
Seymour was born in Litchfield, Connecticut, on May 31, 1778, the son of Mary (Molly) Marsh Seymour and Major Moses Seymour, a veteran of the American Revolution, the longtime Litchfield town clerk, and a member of the Connecticut House of Representatives. Horatio Seymour attended the local schools, and was tutored by his brother in law, the Reverend Truman Marsh. Seymour graduated from Yale College in 1797 and received his Master of Arts degree from Yale in 1799. He taught school in Cheshire, Connecticut, and studied at the Litchfield Law School. Seymour then moved to Middlebury, Vermont, completed his legal training in the office of Daniel Chipman, and was admitted to the bar in 1800.

== Start of career ==
Seymour established a successful law practice in Middlebury. He also trained several prospective attorneys in his office, including Edward John Phelps, John C. Churchill, and John Wolcott Stewart. He was active in the Episcopal Church, and the management of the Addison County Grammar School and Middlebury College.

From 1800 to 1809 Seymour was Middlebury's postmaster. He was a member of the State executive council from 1809 to 1814, and state’s attorney for Addison County from 1810 to 1813 and 1815 to 1819.

== United States senator ==
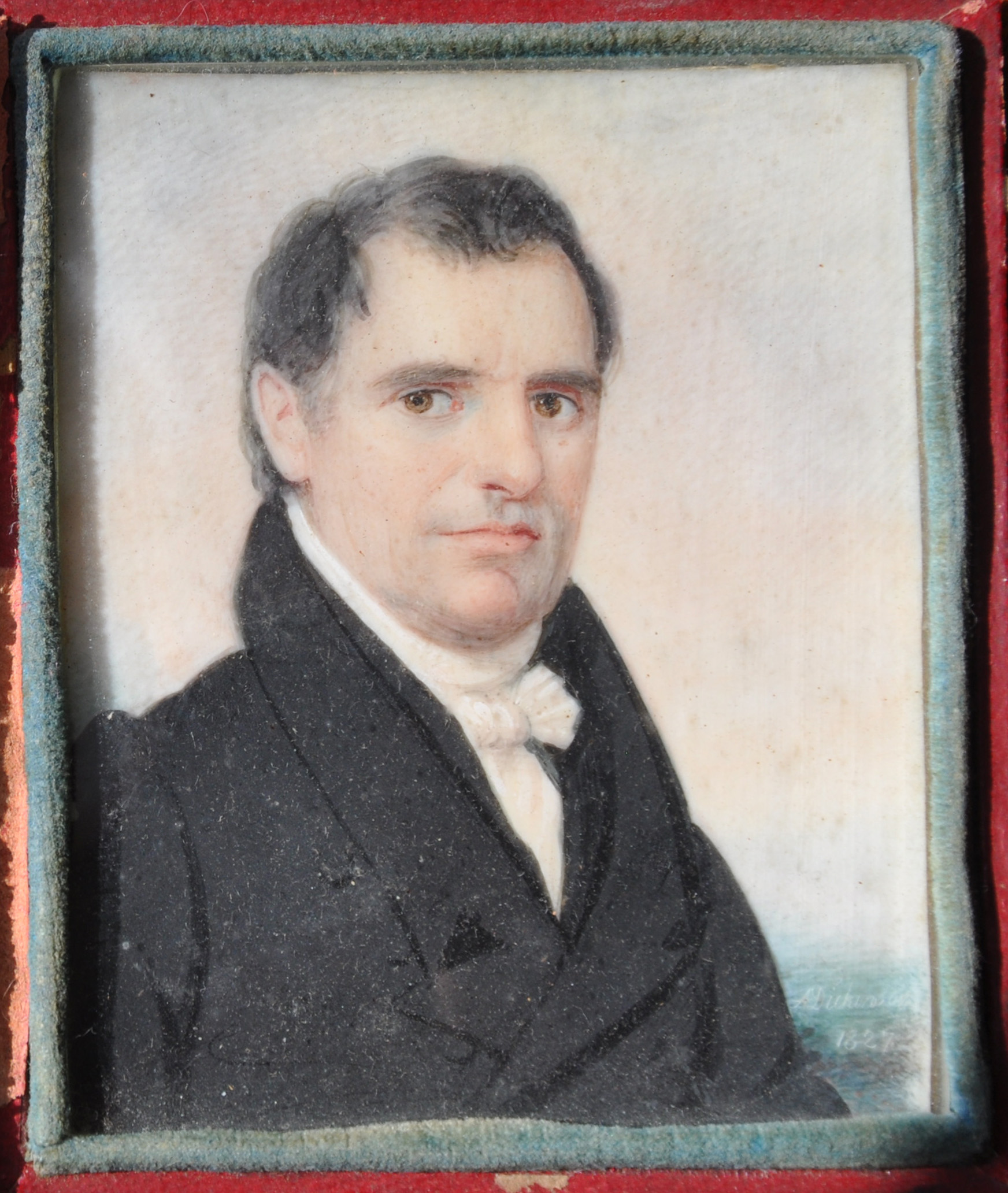
Horatio Seymour portrait by Anson Dickinson

In 1820 Seymour was a successful Democratic-Republican candidate for the United States Senate. He was reelected as a National Republican in 1826, and served from March 4, 1821 to March 3, 1833. He did not run for re-election in 1832. During his Senate career, Seymour served as chairman of the Committee to Audit and Control the Contingent Expenses (18th and 19th Congresses), and the Committee on Agriculture (22nd Congress).

== Later career ==
Seymour continued his Middlebury law practice after leaving the Senate. By now a Whig, he ran unsuccessfully for Governor of Vermont several times in the 1830s in an ultimately successful effort to have his new party supplant the Anti-Masonic Party as the main alternative to the Democratic Party. From 1847 to 1856 he served as Addison County's probate court judge.

== Death and burial ==
Seymour died in Middlebury, Vermont on November 21, 1857. He was buried in Middlebury's West Cemetery.

== Family ==
In 1800 Seymour married Lucy Case of Addison. They were the parents of four sons and two daughters. Lucy Case Seymour died in 1838.

Seymour's son Ozias (1801–1861) was an attorney in Middlebury, and served as Addison County State's Attorney.

His son Horatio Seymour Jr. (1813–1872) was an attorney in Buffalo, New York and served as Erie County's surrogate court judge.

Seymour's son Moses was a merchant and farmer, first in Middlebury, and later in Geneva, Wisconsin, and served in local office including president of Geneva's board of village trustees.

His daughter Mary was 16 when she died of tuberculosis in 1821.

Seymour's daughter Emma was the wife of Phillip Battell and they were the parents of two children before her death in 1841. Their daughter, also named Emma (1837–1900), was the wife of John Wolcott Stewart.

His son Henry served in the United States Army during the Second Seminole War, and died in Boston in 1847.

== Legacy ==
In 1811 Seymour received the honorary degree of master of arts from Middlebury College.

In 1847 Yale University awarded Seymour an honorary LL.D., an event timed to coincide with the fiftieth anniversary of his college graduation.

In 1816 Seymour built a large brick house at the corner of what are now Main and Seymour streets in Middlebury. His descendants made a gift of the house to the town in 1932, and it now operates as the Middlebury Community House, a meeting place that provides Middlebury's children with social, recreational and educational activities.

== See also ==
- Seymour-Conkling family

Party political offices
First	Whig nominee for Governor of Vermont; 1833, 1834	Succeeded by Silas H. Jennison
U.S. Senate
Preceded by Isaac Tichenor	U.S. senator (Class 1) from Vermont; March 4, 1821 – March 3, 1833; Served alongside: William A. Palmer, Dudley Chase and Samuel Prentiss	Succeeded by Benjamin Swift
