= Allen Wardner =

American politician (1786–1877)

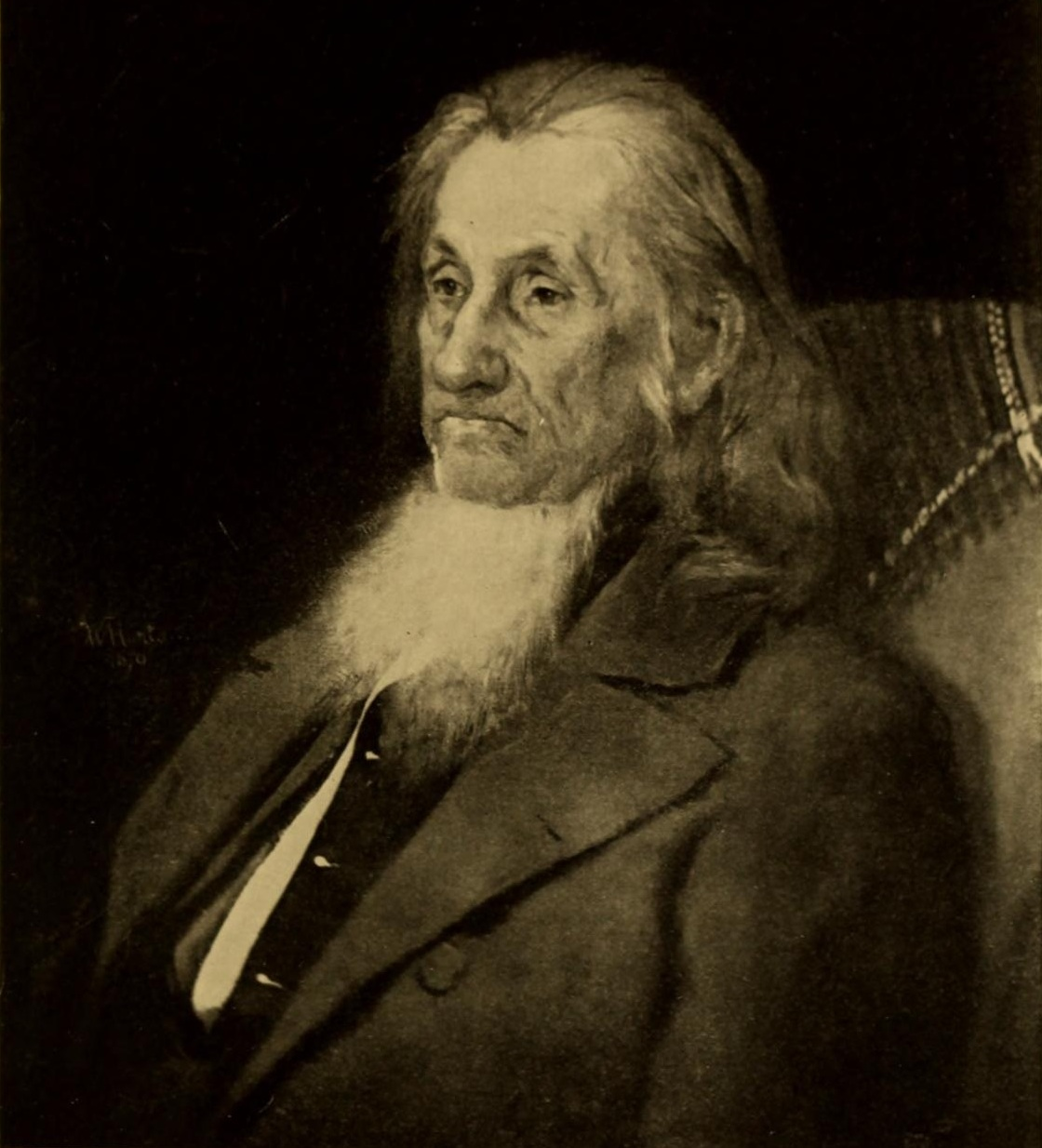

Vermont State Treasurer
- In office October, 1837 – October 1838
- Preceded by: Augustine Clarke
- Succeeded by: Henry Fisk Janes

Member of the Vermont Governor's Council
- In office 1834–1836
- Preceded by: Samuel C. Loveland
- Succeeded by: None (Position eliminated)

Member of the Vermont House of Representatives from Windsor
- In office 1842–1843
- Preceded by: Carlos Coolidge
- Succeeded by: Horace Everett
- In office 1831–1834
- Preceded by: Thomas Leland
- Succeeded by: Carlos Coolidge

Personal details
- Born: December 13, 1786 Alstead, New Hampshire, US
- Died: August 29, 1877 (aged 90) Windsor, Vermont, US
- Resting place: Old South Church Cemetery, Windsor, Vermont
- Party: National Republican; Anti-Masonic; Whig; Republican
- Spouse: Minerva Bingham (Married 1814, died 1841)
- Children: George; Edward; Henry; Helen; Charlotte; Elizabeth; Martha
- Profession: Businessman; Banker

Allen Wardner (December 13, 1786 – August 29, 1877) was a Vermont banker, businessman and politician who served as State Treasurer. He was also the father-in-law of Attorney General, Secretary of State and United States Senator William M. Evarts.

== Early life ==
Allen Wardner was born in Alstead, New Hampshire on December 13, 1786. His family moved to Windsor, Vermont in 1800 and Wardner was trained as a store clerk and merchant. He is presumed to have attended the United States Military Academy in 1809, but there is no record at the school of Wardner having attended. One possible explanation is that he attended sessions with a tutor in preparation for taking the entrance exam, but did not take the exam. Whether he attended West Point or was educated elsewhere, he returned to Vermont in 1809 or 1810 to begin a business career.

== Military service ==
In 1810 Wardner joined the Jefferson Artillery, a Windsor militia unit made up of Democratic-Republicans, in anticipation of the War of 1812. In 1825 the Jefferson Artillery took part in the parade and reception for Lafayette during the stop he made in Woodstock, Vermont as part of his tour of the United States. Wardner served in the unit for several years, and attained the rank of Captain. Afterwards, he was frequently referred to as "Captain Wardner."

== Business career ==
Wardner operated a successful store, first as the junior partner of Dr. Isaac Green, and later as the senior partner of his brother, Shubael Wardner. He also became involved in banking, including serving on the board of directors of the Windsor Bank, and President of the Ascutney Bank.

In addition to his mercantile and banking interests, Wardner was involved in several other ventures, including constructing the Ascutney Mill Dam to supply water power to mills and factories in Windsor, woolen mills, and construction and operation of the Cornish–Windsor Covered Bridge between Windsor and Cornish, New Hampshire.

== Start of political career ==
By now an Anti-Mason, Wardner served in the Vermont House of Representatives from 1831 to 1834.

In 1832 he was appointed to the committee which oversaw construction of the second Vermont State House.

In the 1830s he was also a member of the committee which oversaw operations at the Vermont State Prison in Windsor, and served as one of the state's Commissioners of the Deaf & Dumb, responsible to ensure that those with physical and mental disabilities who required assistance at state expense received it.

From 1834 to 1835 Wardner served on the Vermont Governor's Council.

In 1835 Wardner was an original incorporator of the Connecticut and Passumpsic Rivers Railroad.

== State Treasurer ==
In the 1837 election the incumbent State Treasurer, Augustine Clarke, received the most votes, but fell short of the majority required by the Vermont Constitution. Clarke was an Anti-Mason and his party's popularity was on the wane. In cases where no candidate receives a majority, the Vermont General Assembly is empowered to elect a candidate.

The legislature was split between Democrats, Whigs and Anti-Masons, and failed to choose a winner. Governor Silas H. Jennison, an Anti-Mason who had run with Whig support, then appointed Wardner, who served from October, 1837 until October, 1838. He was succeeded by Henry Fisk Janes.

== Later life ==
Wardner remained active in business and banking, and also served in government positions including a term in the Vermont House in 1842 and a position on the board of directors of the Vermont State Prison.

In 1848 Wardner was an incorporator of the New Hampshire Central Railroad.

Following the death of his wife he began to withdraw from active management of his business ventures, turned over their management to one of his sons and retired in the late 1840s. He became a Whig after the Anti-Masonic Party dissolved, and joined the Republicans when that party was founded in the 1850s.

In the 1850s Wardner was active in the American Colonization Society, which opposed slavery and advocated having African-Americans relocate to communities in Africa and South and Central America.

== Death and burial ==
Wardner died in Windsor on August 29, 1877. He was buried in Windsor's Old South Church Cemetery.

== Family ==
In 1814 Wardner married Minerva Bingham, who died in 1841. They had 12 children, seven of whom lived to adulthood. They included: George, Edward, Henry, Helen, Charlotte, Elizabeth, and Martha.

Helen Wardner was the wife of William M. Evarts.

Several descendants named their sons after Allen Wardner. These namesakes include Allen Wardner Evarts (1848-1920), a New York attorney. He was the son of William M. Evarts and Helen Wardner.

Allen Wardner's descendants also included another son of William M. Evarts, Maxwell Evarts. Maxwell Evarts (1862–1913), was a New York City and Vermont attorney, banker and business executive.

Political offices
Preceded by Augustine Clarke	Vermont State Treasurer; 1837–1838	Succeeded by Henry Fisk Janes
