= James Fisk (politician) =

American judge and politician (1763-1844)

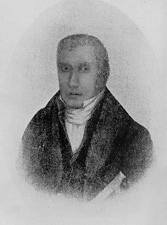

United States Senator from Vermont
- In office November 4, 1817 – January 8, 1818
- Preceded by: Dudley Chase
- Succeeded by: William A. Palmer

Member of the U.S. House of Representatives from Vermont
- In office March 4, 1805 – March 3, 1809
- Preceded by: William Chamberlain
- Succeeded by: William Chamberlain
- Constituency: 3rd district
- In office March 4, 1811 – March 3, 1815
- Preceded by: William Chamberlain (3rd); Constituency established (AL)
- Succeeded by: Constituency abolished (3rd); Chauncey Langdon (AL)
- Constituency: 3rd district (1811-13); At-large district (1813-15)

Member of the Vermont House of Representatives
- In office 1800–1805; 1809–1810; 1815

Personal details
- Born: October 4, 1763 Greenwich, Province of Massachusetts Bay, British America
- Died: November 17, 1844 (aged 81) Swanton, Vermont, U.S.
- Party: Democratic-Republican
- Spouse: Priscilla West
- Profession: Politician, Minister, Lawyer, Judge

James Fisk (October 4, 1763 – November 17, 1844) was an American politician from Vermont. He served in the House of Representatives and the United States Senate.

== Early life ==
Fisk was born in Greenwich, in what was then the Province of Massachusetts Bay, the son of Stephen Fisk and Anna Bradish. His father died when Fisk was a year old, and he was largely self-educated. As a teenager, he worked on his family's farm.

== Start of career ==
=== Military service ===
He served in the Revolutionary War from 1779 to 1782 as a private in Captain Willis' Company, Colonel Brooks' Regiment, a unit of the Massachusetts Militia.

=== Post-American Revolution ===
After the war, he was a farmer in Greenwich. In 1785, Fisk served as a member of the Massachusetts General Court.

== Move to Vermont ==
In 1798, Fisk moved to what is now Barre City, Vermont, but was then a village in the Town of Barre. While owning and operating a farm, Fisk received his credentials as a Universalist minister and began to preach. He also studied law, was admitted to the bar, and began the practice of law as the first attorney in Barre. In 1799 he was elected to the town's board of selectmen.

Fisk represented Barre in the Vermont House of Representatives from 1800 to 1805, 1809 to 1810 and in 1815. He was judge of the Orange County, Vermont Court from 1802 to 1809 and in 1816. In 1803, he was Orange County's member of the commission to choose a permanent site for the state capital, which selected Montpelier In 1804, he served as chairman of the commission that attempted to settle the question of the Vermont-Canada boundary.

== Congressman ==
In 1804, Fisk was elected to the United States House of Representatives as a Democratic-Republican. He was reelected in 1806, and served two terms, March 4, 1805, to March 3, 1809. He ran unsuccessfully for reelection in 1808.

In 1810, Fiske was elected again to the House. He was reelected in 1812, and served from March 4, 1811, to March 3, 1815. He was chairman of the Committee on Elections.

Fisk was appointed United States Judge for the Territory of Indiana in 1812 by President James Madison, but declined the appointment. He was a delegate to the state constitutional convention in 1814, and served as judge of the Supreme Court of Vermont from 1815 to 1816.

== U.S. Senator ==
In 1817, Fisk was elected to the United States Senate to fill the vacancy caused by the resignation of Dudley Chase. He served from November 4, 1817, until resigning on January 8, 1818 to become U.S. collector of customs for the district of Vermont. He served from 1818 until 1826, and moved to Swanton in 1819 so that he could be closer to the border with Canada and the crossing points where customs were paid.

== Death ==
Fisk died in Swanton on November 17, 1844.

== Family ==
Following his Revolutionary War service, Fisk married Priscilla West (1763–1840).

Fisk's daughter Parma was the wife of Orlando Stevens, who served as Fisk's deputy collector, and was later a member of the legislatures of both Vermont and Minnesota.

U.S. House of Representatives
Preceded by William Chamberlain	Member of the U.S. House of Representatives from Vermont's 3rd congressional district 1805–1809	Succeeded by William Chamberlain
Preceded by William Chamberlain	Member of the U.S. House of Representatives from Vermont's 3rd congressional district 1811–1815	Succeeded by Chauncey Langdon
U.S. Senate
Preceded by Dudley Chase	U.S. senator (Class 3) from Vermont; 1817—1818; Served alongside: Isaac Tichenor	Succeeded by William A. Palmer
