= Ezra Meech =

American politician

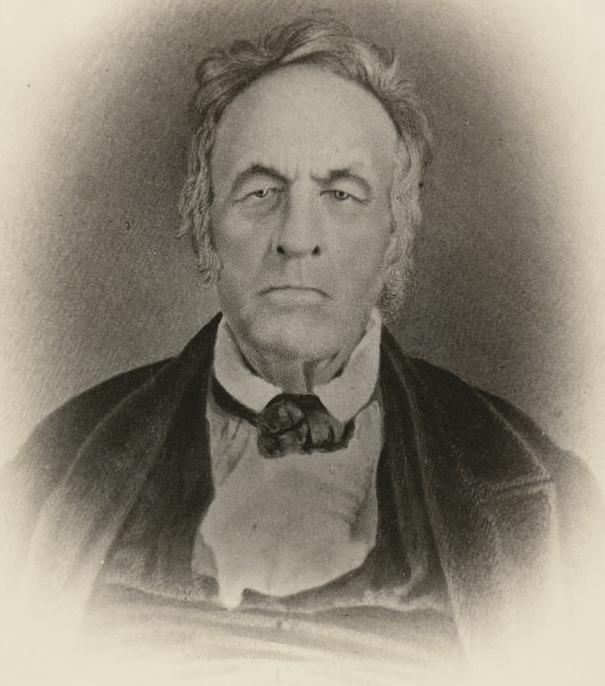

Member of the U.S. House of Representatives from Vermont
- In office March 4, 1819 – March 3, 1821
- Preceded by: William Hunter
- Succeeded by: John Mattocks
- Constituency: At-large district
- In office March 4, 1825 – March 4, 1827
- Preceded by: Daniel Buck
- Succeeded by: Benjamin Swift
- Constituency: 4th district

Member of the Vermont House of Representatives from Shelburne
- In office 1805–1806
- Preceded by: Nathaniel Newell
- Succeeded by: Nathaniel Newell

Personal details
- Born: July 26, 1773 New London, Connecticut Colony, British America
- Died: September 23, 1856 (aged 83) Shelburne, Vermont, U.S.
- Party: Democratic-Republican, Jacksonian
- Spouse: Mary McNeil Meech
- Children: 8
- Profession: Farmer; Businessman

Ezra Meech (July 26, 1773 – September 23, 1856) was an American fur trader and politician. He served as a U.S. representative from Vermont.

== Biography ==
Meech was born in New London in the Connecticut Colony to Elisha Meech and Faith Satterly Meech. He moved to Hinesburg in the Vermont Republic with his parents in 1785 and attended the common schools. Meech engaged in the fur trade in the Northwest and in ship-timber contracts in British Canada. In 1795 he opened a store at Charlotte Four Corners, Vermont. He moved to Shelburne, Vermont, and owned a farm. He also raised cattle and horses, and manufactured potash. In 1806 he was an agent of the Northwestern Fur Company.

Meech was a member of the Vermont House of Representatives from 1805 until 1807. He was elected as a Democratic-Republican candidate to the Sixteenth United States Congress, serving from March 4, 1819, until March 3, 1821. He was a delegate to the state constitutional conventions in 1822 and 1826, and was chief judge of the Chittenden County Court in 1822 and 1823.

Meech was elected as a Jacksonian candidate to the Nineteenth United States Congress, serving from March 4, 1825, until March 3, 1827. He was an unsuccessful Democratic candidate for Governor of Vermont in 1830, 1831, 1832, and 1833. Meech served as a presidential elector on the Whig ticket in 1840. He then resumed agricultural pursuits.

== Personal life ==
Meech married Mary McNeil Meech in 1800. They had eight children.

== Death ==
Meech died on September 23, 1856, in Shelburne, Vermont. He is interred at the Shelburne Village Cemetery.

Party political offices
Preceded by Joel Doolittle	Democratic nominee for Governor of Vermont; 1830, 1831, 1832, 1833	Succeeded by William Czar Bradley
U.S. House of Representatives
Preceded by William Hunter	Member of the U.S. House of Representatives from Vermont's at-large congressional district 1819-1821	Succeeded by Seat inactive
Preceded by Daniel A. A. Buck	Member of the U.S. House of Representatives from Vermont's 4th congressional district 1825-1827	Succeeded by Benjamin Swift
