= Luther Jewett =

American physician, clergyman, and politician from Vermont

Member of the U.S. House of Representatives from Vermont's at-large district
- In office March 4, 1815 – March 3, 1817
- Preceded by: William Strong
- Succeeded by: Mark Richards

Assistant Judge of Caledonia County, Vermont
- In office 1812–1814 Serving with John W. Chandler
- Preceded by: John W. Chandler, William Cahoon
- Succeeded by: John W. Chandler, William Cahoon

Personal details
- Born: December 24, 1772 Canterbury, Connecticut Colony, British America
- Died: March 8, 1860 (aged 87) St. Johnsbury, Vermont, U.S.
- Resting place: Mount Pleasant Cemetery in Saint Johnsbury
- Party: Federalist
- Spouse(s): Betsey Adams Jewett and Nancy Chamberlain Jewett
- Children: Mira Jane Jewett Abbott and Martha Jewett Lefevre
- Profession: doctor, minister, congressman

Luther Jewett (December 24, 1772 – March 8, 1860) was an American medical doctor, minister and politician. He served as a United States representative from Vermont for one term from 1815 to 1817.

== Biography ==
Jewett was born in Canterbury in the Connecticut Colony to Daniel and Zilpha (Hibbard) Jewett. He graduated from Dartmouth College, A.B., in 1795. He studied medicine and began to practice in Putney, Vermont, in 1800. In 1810, Jewett received his M.B. from Dartmouth.

=== Congress ===
In 1814, Jewett was elected as a Federalist to the Fourteenth Congress and served from March 4, 1815, to March 3, 1817.

=== Later career ===
After leaving Congress, Jewett moved to St. Johnsbury and studied theology. He was ordained as a pastor of the Congregation Church and Society and officiated in Newbury from 1821 to 1828. Jewett returned to St. Johnsbury and published the Farmer’s Herald from 1828 to 1832, and the Free Mason’s Friend from 1830 to 1832.

== Family life ==
Jewett's first wife was Betsey Adams Jewett and their only child, Mira Jane Jewett Abbott, was born in 1809. Jewett's second wife was Nancy Chamberlain Jewett, and their daughter, Martha Jewett Lefevre, was born in 1817.

== Death ==
Jewett died on March 8, 1860, in St. Johnsbury, Vermont, and is buried at Mount Pleasant Cemetery in Saint Johnsbury, along with both of his wives.

U.S. House of Representatives
Preceded by William Strong	Member of the U.S. House of Representatives from Vermont's at-large congressional district 1815-1817	Succeeded by Mark Richards
