= Alabama Territory's at-large congressional district =

Former congressional district

Coordinates: 32.7°N 86.7°W

- Obsolete district
- Created: 1818, as a non-voting delegate was granted by Congress
- Eliminated: 1819, as a result of statehood
- Years active: 1818–1819

Alabama Territory's at-large congressional district was the U.S. House of Representatives congressional district for the Alabama Territory to elect a territorial delegate (non-voting) to represent, participate in floor debates, lobby and sit in on committee meetings) in the U.S. House of Representatives, lower chamber of the Congress of the United States, sitting in the United States Capitol on Capitol Hill in the federal national capital city of Washington, D.C..

== List of delegates representing the district ==
On March 3, 1817, the Alabama Territory was created. A non-voting delegate was elected at-large beginning January 29, 1818.

| Delegate | Party | Years | Cong ress | Electoral history |
|---|---|---|---|---|
District created January 29, 1818
| John Crowell (St. Stephens) | none | January 29, 1818 – March 3, 1819 | 15th | Elected in 1818. (Note: but might have been elected in early 1819.); Alabama achieved statehood. Elected to Alabama's at-large congressional district |
District eliminated March 3, 1819
