= John Crowell (Alabama politician) =

American politician (1780–1846)

Joseph Crowell
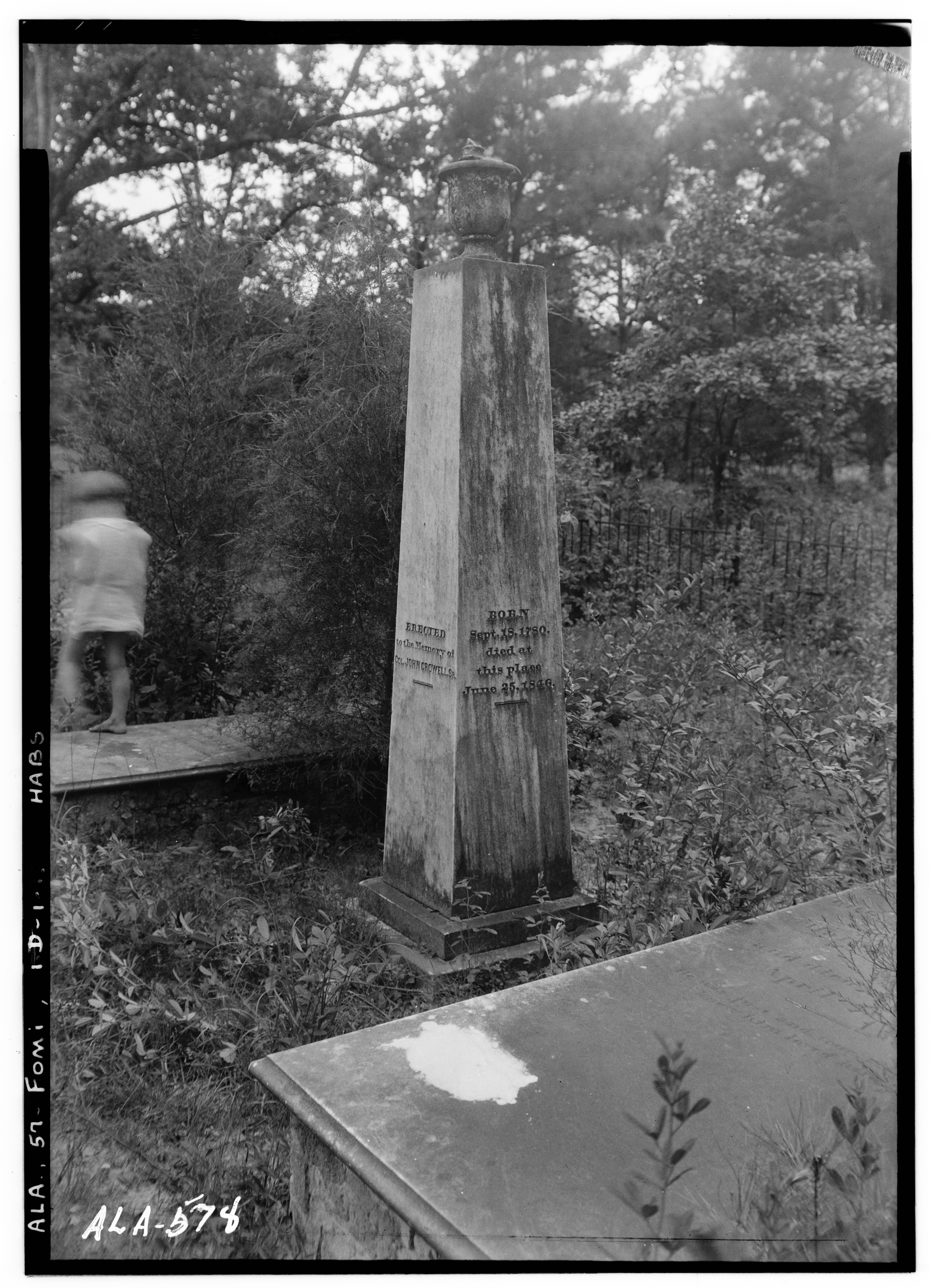
- Crowell's tomb in Fort Mitchell, Alabama

Member of the U.S. House of Representatives from Alabama's at-large district
- In office December 14, 1819 – March 3, 1821
- Preceded by: Himself (Delegate)
- Succeeded by: Gabriel Moore

Delegate to the U.S. House of Representatives from the Alabama Territory's at-large district
- In office January 29, 1818 – March 3, 1819
- Preceded by: Constituency established
- Succeeded by: Himself (Representative)

Personal details
- Born: Joseph John Crowell; September 18, 1780 Halifax County, North Carolina, U.S.
- Died: June 25, 1846 (aged 65) Fort Mitchell, Alabama, U.S.
- Party: Democratic-Republican

Joseph John Crowell (September 18, 1780 – June 25, 1846) was born in Halifax County, North Carolina. He was educated locally. In the War of 1812, he helped to recruit a regiment and was commissioned as a colonel. He moved to Alabama in 1815, serving as Congressional Delegate from the Alabama Territory. In the election of 1818, he became the first member of the House of Representatives from the new state of Alabama. When he retired after one term in 1821, President James Monroe appointed him the United States Indian agent to the Creek Indians. He died at Fort Mitchell, Alabama in 1846.

The interpreter, scout, and plantation owner Paddy Carr was his foster son.

Crowell operated a racetrack at Coweta town, where plantation owners like James Jackson raced their thoroughbreds.

== Sources ==
- United States Congress. "John Crowell (id: C000942)". Biographical Directory of the United States Congress.

U.S. House of Representatives
New constituency	Delegate to the U.S. House of Representatives from Alabama Territory's at-large congressional district 1818–1819	Succeeded by Himself as U.S. Representative
Preceded by Himself as U.S. Delegate	Member of the U.S. House of Representatives from Alabama's at-large congressional district 1819–1821	Succeeded by Gabriel Moore
