= William A. Palmer =

American judge

William Adams Palmer
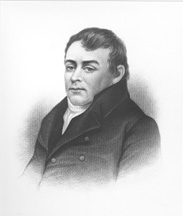

13th Governor of Vermont
- In office October 18, 1831 – November 2, 1835
- Lieutenant: Lebbeus Egerton
- Preceded by: Samuel C. Crafts
- Succeeded by: Silas H. Jennison

United States Senator from Vermont
- In office October 20, 1818 – March 3, 1825
- Preceded by: James Fisk
- Succeeded by: Dudley Chase

Member of the Vermont Senate
- In office 1836–1838 Serving with John Beckwith (1836), Joseph H. Ingalls (1837)
- Preceded by: None (position created)
- Succeeded by: Robert Harvey, Andrew McMillan
- Constituency: Caledonia County

Associate Justice of the Vermont Supreme Court
- In office 1816–1817
- Preceded by: James Fisk
- Succeeded by: William Brayton

Member of the Vermont House of Representatives from Danville
- In office 1825–1827
- Preceded by: Augustine Clarke
- Succeeded by: William A. Griswold
- In office 1818–1819
- Preceded by: William A. Griswold
- Succeeded by: William A. Griswold
- In office 1811–1813
- Preceded by: William A. Griswold
- Succeeded by: William A. Griswold

Probate Judge of Caledonia County, Vermont
- In office 1811–1817
- Preceded by: John W. Chandler
- Succeeded by: John W. Chandler
- In office 1808–1809
- Preceded by: John W. Chandler
- Succeeded by: John W. Chandler

County Clerk of Caledonia County, Vermont
- In office 1808–1816
- Preceded by: Elkanah Phelps
- Succeeded by: Curtis Stanley

Personal details
- Born: September 12, 1781 Hebron, Connecticut, US
- Died: December 3, 1860 (aged 79) Danville, Vermont, US
- Resting place: Danville Green Cemetery, Danville, Vermont, US
- Party: Democratic-Republican; National Republican; Anti-Masonic; Democratic
- Spouse: Sarah Chandler Blanchard (m. 1813-1853, her death)
- Relations: Augustine Clarke (brother-in-law)
- Children: 7
- Profession: Attorney

William Adams Palmer (September 12, 1781 – December 3, 1860) was an American lawyer and politician. A prominent of the Anti-Masonic Party in the 1830s, he was most notable for his service as a United States Senator from Vermont (1818–1825) and the 13th governor of Vermont (1831–1835).

A native of Hebron, Connecticut, Palmer studied law in Hebron before moving to Chelsea, Vermont, where he completed his studies and attained admission to the bar in 1805. He resided in several Vermont towns and attempted to establish a law practice before settling on Danville.

Palmer became active in politics as a Democratic-Republican and served in offices including probate judge of Caledonia County. He was also Danville's member of the Vermont House of Representatives on several occasions. From 1816 to 1817, he served as second associate justice of the Vermont Supreme Court.

In 1818, Palmer was elected to the United States Senate. He served until 1825, and during his term the Democratic-Republicans began to split into adherents of John Quincy Adams and Henry Clay, known as the National Republican Party and Andrew Jackson, knows as the Democratic Party. Palmer became affiliated with the National Republicans.

In 1829, Palmer was an organizer of America's first third party, the Anti-Masonic Party. The Anti-Masons opposed secret societies, especially Masons, who they argued controlled several institutions including the government in defiance of democratic principles. The Anti-Masonic movement was especially strong in Vermont, and in 1831, Palmer was elected governor. He was reelected each year through 1834, and served from October 1831 to October 1835.

After leaving the governorship, Palmer farmed and practiced law in Danville. He served in the Vermont Senate from 1836 to 1838. Palmer died in Danville on December 3, 1860, and was buried at Danville Green Cemetery in Danville.

== Biography ==
Palmer was born in Hebron, Connecticut, on September 12, 1781, the son of Stephen Palmer and Susannah (Sawyer) Palmer. He was a descendant of Walter Palmer, a founder of Charlestown, Massachusetts, and New London, Connecticut. During childhood, he lost part of one hand in an accident when he slipped and fell on ice while carrying an axe. He completed his elementary education in Hebron, studied law in Hebron with John Thompson Peters, later a justice of the Connecticut Supreme Court, and then with Daniel Buck in Chelsea, Vermont. Palmer was admitted to the bar in 1805 and practiced in Brownington, Derby, and St. Johnsbury before settling in Danville.

== Career ==
Palmer was elected Probate Judge for Caledonia County from 1808 to 1809, and from 1811 to 1817. He was clerk of the county court from 1808 to 1816. He was a member of the Vermont House of Representatives from 1811 to 1813, 1818 to 1819, and 1825 to 1827. From 1816 to 1817, he served as second associate justice of the Vermont Supreme Court, succeeding James Fisk, who was appointed first associate justice. In 1817, Palmer declined appointment as first associate justice and was succeeded as second associate by William Brayton. In 1817 Palmer received the honorary degree of Master of Arts from the University of Vermont.

In 1818, Palmer was elected to the United States Senate to fill the vacancy caused by the resignation of James Fisk; was re-elected and served from October 20, 1818, until March 3, 1825; first as a Democratic-Republican and from 1823 as a National Republican. He then returned to the state House of Representatives and to the position of judge. He was also a delegate to the Vermont State Constitutional conventions in 1828, 1836, and 1850.

Palmer organized the first convention of Vermont's Anti-Masonic Party in Montpelier in 1829. He was elected Governor of Vermont in 1831 on the Anti-Masonic ticket and stayed in office until 1835. He proposed the 1833 law that any person administering a secret oath in any organization such as the Masons would be fined, and advocated the 1834 law to suspend the charter of Vermont's Grand Lodge. During his tenure, imprisonment of females for debt was abolished, fourteen new schools were established, seven new banks were chartered, and legislation was enacted to expand the railway system.

Palmer retired to his farm, but continued to be politically active. As a Democrat, he was elected to the Vermont Senate in 1836 and he served until 1838.

== Death ==
Palmer died in Danville on December 3, 1860. He was buried at Danville Green Cemetery in Danville.

== Family ==
In 1813, Palmer married Sarah Chandler Blanchard of Danville. They were the parents of seven children. Five survived to adulthood, including William B., Abial C., Henry W., Frank R., and Edward.

Party political offices
Preceded by Heman Allen	Anti-Masonic nominee for Governor of Vermont; 1830, 1831, 1832, 1833, 1834, 1835	Succeeded by None
U.S. Senate
Preceded by James Fisk	U.S. senator (Class 3) from Vermont; 1818–1825; Served alongside: Isaac Tichenor, Horatio Seymour	Succeeded by Dudley Chase
Political offices
Preceded by Samuel C. Crafts	Governor of Vermont; 1831–1835	Succeeded by Silas H. Jennison
