= Mark Richards (politician) =

American politician (1760–1844)

9th Lieutenant Governor of Vermont
- In office 1830–1831
- Governor: Samuel C. Crafts
- Preceded by: Henry Olin
- Succeeded by: Lebbeus Egerton

Member of the U.S. House of Representatives from Vermont's At-large congressional district
- In office March 4, 1817 – March 3, 1821
- Preceded by: Luther Jewett
- Succeeded by: Phineas White

Member of the Vermont Governor's Council
- In office 1815–1816
- Preceded by: William Hall Jr.
- Succeeded by: Theophilus Crawford
- In office 1813–1814
- Preceded by: William Czar Bradley
- Succeeded by: William Hall Jr.

Sheriff of Windham County, Vermont
- In office 1806–1811
- Preceded by: Samuel Fletcher
- Succeeded by: Gilbert Dennison

Member of the Vermont House of Representatives from Westminster
- In office 1834–1835
- Preceded by: John Smith
- Succeeded by: Vacant
- In office 1832–1833
- Preceded by: Cyrus Boynton
- Succeeded by: John Smith
- In office 1828–1829
- Preceded by: Ebenezer Goodell
- Succeeded by: Daniel Mason
- In office 1826–1827
- Preceded by: Gideon Warner
- Succeeded by: Ebenezer Goodell
- In office 1824–1825
- Preceded by: Elijah Ranney Jr.
- Succeeded by: Ebenezer Goodell
- In office 1804–1805
- Preceded by: Ephraim Ranney Jr.
- Succeeded by: Ephraim Ranney Jr.
- In office 1801–1802
- Preceded by: Ephraim Ranney Jr.
- Succeeded by: Stephen R. Bradley

Personal details
- Born: July 15, 1760 Waterbury, Connecticut Colony, British America
- Died: August 10, 1844 (aged 84) Westminster, Vermont, U.S.
- Resting place: Old Westminster Cemetery, Westminster, Vermont
- Party: Democratic-Republican
- Spouse: Ann Ruggles (m. 1782-1841, her death)
- Profession: Merchant

Mark Richards (July 15, 1760 – August 10, 1844) was an American politician. He served as a member of the United States House of Representatives from Vermont and as the ninth lieutenant governor of Vermont.

== Biography ==
Richards was born in Waterbury in the Connecticut Colony on July 15, 1760, and received limited schooling. In 1776, he enlisted for the American Revolution. A private in the Continental Army, he served for several years, including the Battle of Red Bank, the 1777-1778 winter encampment at Valley Forge, the Battle of Monmouth, and the Battle of Stony Point. Richards moved to Boston after the war to work in a general store. In 1796 he moved to Westminster, Vermont, to open his own store.

Richards was a member of the Vermont House of Representatives from 1801 to 1805. He served as sheriff of Windham County from 1806 to 1810 and was a Presidential elector in 1812. He served on the Governor’s council from 1813 to 1816.

Richards was elected as a Democratic-Republican to the US House of Representatives, and served from 1817 to 1821 as a member of the 15th and 16th United States Congress. He served again in the Vermont House of Representatives from 1824 to 1826, in 1828 and from 1832 to 1834. He was the Lieutenant Governor of Vermont from 1830 to 1831.

== Death ==
Richards died on August 10, 1844, in Westminster, Vermont, and is interred in the Bradley tomb in the Old Westminster Cemetery in Westminster.

== Family ==
In 1782, Richards married Ann Ruggles. Their daughter Sarah was the wife of William Czar Bradley.

Party political offices
Preceded by Henry Olin	National Republican nominee for Lieutenant Governor of Vermont; 1830	Succeeded by Jedediah Harris
U.S. House of Representatives
Preceded by Luther Jewett	Member of the U.S. House of Representatives from Vermont's at-large congressional district March 4, 1817 – March 3, 1821	Succeeded by district eliminated
Political offices
Preceded by Henry Olin	Lieutenant Governor of Vermont; 1830–1831	Succeeded by Lebbeus Egerton
