= Chauncey Langdon =

American politician

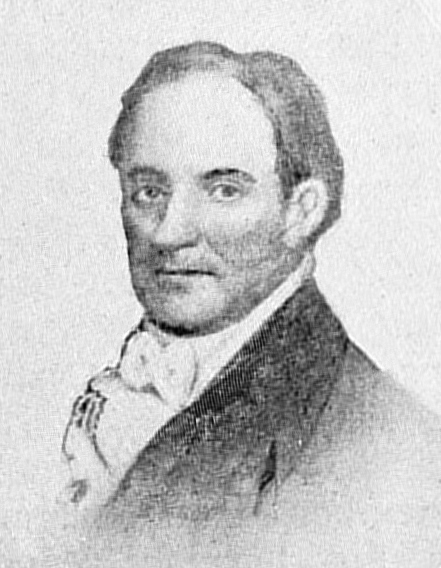

Member of the United States House of Representatives from Vermont's at-large district
- In office March 4, 1815 – March 3, 1817
- Preceded by: James Fisk
- Succeeded by: Charles Rich

Member of the Vermont House of Representatives
- In office 1813–1814; 1817; 1819–1820; 1822

Personal details
- Born: November 8, 1763 Farmington, Connecticut Colony, British America
- Died: July 23, 1830 (aged 66) Castleton, Vermont, U.S.
- Party: Federalist Party (United States)
- Spouse: Lucy Nona Lathrop Langdon
- Children: Benjamin Franklin Langdon and Lucy Green Langdon Williams
- Profession: Politician, Lawyer, Judge

Chauncey Langdon (November 8, 1763 – July 23, 1830) was an American politician, lawyer and judge. He served as a United States representative from Vermont.

== Early life ==
Langdon was born to Ebenezer and Katherine (Green) Langdon in Farmington in the Connecticut Colony. Pursuing classical studies, he graduated from Yale College in 1787, where he was a member of Brothers in Unity. He then studied at the Litchfield Law School and with Judge Sylvester Gilbert, of Hebron, Connecticut, and was admitted to the bar. He began the practice of law in Castleton, Vermont.

== Career ==
Langdon became an active Federalist. He practiced law in Windsor, but later returned to Castleton. He served as the Rutland County Register of Probate from 1792 to 1794, in 1796, and again in 1813. He was Judge of Probate in 1798 and 1799. In 1808 he served on the state Executive Council. He received an honorary degree at Middlebury Collegein Vermont in 1803 and was a trustee from 1811 until his death. He was a member of the Vermont House of Representatives in 1813, 1814, 1817, 1819, 1820, and 1822.

Langdon was elected as a Federalist to the Fourteenth Congress, serving from March 4, 1815, until March 3, 1817. He was not a candidate for renomination to the Fifteenth Congress. He was again elected to the Executive Council and served from 1823 until his death.

== Family life ==
He married Lucy Nona Lathrop Langdon on April 7, 1789. They had one son, Benjamin Franklin Langdon, and one daughter, Lucy Green Langdon Williams, who married Governor Charles K. Williams.

== Death ==
Langdon died in Castleton on July 23, 1830. He was also an officer of the Vermont Bible Society.

U.S. House of Representatives
Preceded by James Fisk	Member of the U.S. House of Representatives from Vermont's at-large congressional district 1815-1817	Succeeded by Charles Rich
