= Augustine Clarke =

American politician

Vermont State Treasurer
- In office 1833–1837
- Preceded by: Benjamin Swan
- Succeeded by: Allen Wardner

Member of the Vermont House of Representatives from Danville
- In office 1832
- Preceded by: George W. Drew
- Succeeded by: None (vacant in 1833)
- In office 1830
- Preceded by: William A. Palmer
- Succeeded by: George W. Drew
- In office 1828
- Preceded by: William A. Griswold
- Succeeded by: William A. Palmer
- In office 1824
- Preceded by: George W. Drew
- Succeeded by: William A. Palmer

Assistant Judge of Caledonia County, Vermont
- In office 1824–1825 Serving with Samuel A. Willard
- Preceded by: Joseph Morrill 2nd
- Succeeded by: Samuel Sias

Treasurer of Caledonia County, Vermont
- In office 1822–1824
- Preceded by: Joseph Morrill 2nd
- Succeeded by: Samuel B. Mattocks

Personal details
- Born: 1780 Richmond, Massachusetts
- Died: June 17, 1841 (aged 60–61) Montpelier, Vermont
- Resting place: Elm Street Cemetery, Montpelier, Vermont
- Party: National Republican; Anti-Masonic; Democratic
- Spouse(s): Sophia Blanchard (m. 1808-1830, her death); Julia Jewett Hubbard (m. 1840-1841, his death)
- Profession: Lawyer

Augustine Clarke (c.1780 – June 17, 1841) was a Vermont attorney, banker and politician who was a leader of the Anti-Masonic Party and served as Vermont State Treasurer.

== Early life ==
Details of Clarke's birth are not known for certain. His name is sometimes spelled "Clark" and he appears to have been born in Richmond, Massachusetts in about 1780. He was baptized in Richmond on March 15, 1786. (Note: Clarke's death notice in The New England Puritan reads: "In Montpelier, VT, 17th inst., Hon. Augustine CLARKE, 62, late Tr. of the State. For many yrs. Judge CLARKE resided in Danville and filled various offices in that town, and in the Co. of Caledonia." His age of 62 would mean he was born in 1778 or 1779. In the notice of his death contained in the "Vermont Historical Gazetteer" his age is given as 59. If so, he would have been born in 1781 or 1782. The Vermont Death Record for Augustine Clarke gives his age as 60. If so, he would have been born in 1780 or 1781.)

== Start of career ==
Clarke moved to Vermont and studied law, although the details of his relocation and studies are unknown. In addition, he was active as a merchant and in other business ventures; in 1815, he received a license permitting him to sell liquor and wine.

He was admitted to the bar in Wheelock in 1804. In 1806 he was appointed Wheelock's first Postmaster.

In 1806, Clarke was admitted to the bar in Danville. In 1808 he married Sophia Blanchard in Danville. Sophia Blanchard's sister Sarah was the wife of William A. Palmer, who served as Governor and United States Senator. Palmer and Clarke became leaders of Vermont's Anti-Masons.

Clarke practiced law in Danville. An adherent of the National Republican Party, he served in local offices including Justice of the Peace. In 1820 he served on the Vermont Council of Censors, the body which met every seven years to review statutes passed by the Vermont General Assembly and ensure their constitutionality.

In the 1820s, Clarke also became active in the American Tract Society. In addition, he was an active member of the American Anti-Slavery Society.

He served as Caledonia County Treasurer from 1822 to 1824, and Caledonia County Assistant Judge from 1824 to 1825.

In 1826, he was appointed president of the Caledonia National Bank, succeeding Palmer, who had been the bank's first president.

Clarke represented Danville in the Vermont House of Representatives in 1824, 1828, 1830, and 1832.

In 1830, Clarke was appointed one of Caledonia County's three Commissioners of Jail Delivery. (Note: The Commissioners of Jail Delivery were responsible for receiving prisoners who arrived to begin serving their sentences, and for tracking time in jail and releasing prisoners whose sentences were complete. They also monitored parolees to ensure compliance with conditions of release. In addition, Commissioners of Jail Delivery determined whether those arrested for debt were eligible for and complying with the conditions of the "freedom of the prison." Freedom of the prison entitled debtors to leave the prison grounds to earn money for the payment of their debts and support of their families.)

Clarke was named to the Committee to Erect the State House in 1832. He took part in planning and overseeing construction of the Second State House, which was in use from 1833 until it was destroyed by fire in 1856.

Clarke was one of the founders of the Anti-Masonic movement. William Wirt carried Vermont as the 1832 presidential candidate of the Anti-Masonic Party. Clarke was one of Vermont's electors, and cast his ballot for Wirt.

== Later career ==
Benjamin Swan had served as Vermont's Treasurer beginning in 1800 and often ran unopposed or with only token opposition. In 1833, Clarke ran as an Anti-Mason and defeated Swan in the election for Treasurer. William A. Palmer had run successfully for Governor as an Anti-Mason in 1831, and Clarke's victory at the polls was considered additional evidence of the Anti-Masonic Party's viability in Vermont.

In September, 1837, Clarke was named to the Anti-Masonic Party's National Committee.

Clarke served as Treasurer until running unsuccessfully for reelection in October, 1837. That year Clarke had the highest number of votes, but at 47.3% fell short of the majority required by the Vermont Constitution. In cases where no candidate receives a majority, the Vermont General Assembly votes. By then the Anti-Masonic Party's popularity was on the wane and the nation was in the midst of the Panic of 1837, and Clarke did not win the legislative election.

By 1839, the Anti-Masonic Party had dissolved and Clarke joined the Democratic Party. In July, 1839, he was appointed United States Pension Agent for the State of Vermont.

== Later life ==
Clarke's wife died in 1833. He subsequently moved to Montpelier. In 1839, his daughter Sophia married Samuel L. French, a merchant of Randolph, Vermont. In 1840, he married Julia Jewett Hubbard (d. 1881).

== Death and burial ==
Clarke died in Montpelier on June 17, 1841, and was buried at Montpelier's Elm Street Cemetery.

== Notes ==
Party political offices
First	Anti-Masonic nominee for Vermont State Treasurer; 1830, 1831, 1832, 1833, 1834, 1835, 1836, 1837	Succeeded by None
Political offices
Preceded by Benjamin Swan	Vermont State Treasurer; 1833–1837	Succeeded by Allen Wardner
