= Lebbeus Egerton =

American politician

Member of the Vermont Senate from Orange County
- In office 1839–1840 Serving with Daniel Cobb, Jonathan Jenness
- Preceded by: A. B. W. Tenney, Simeon Short, William Hebard
- Succeeded by: Timothy Short, Simeon Short, Nathaniel Wheatly
- In office 1837–1838 Serving with Daniel Cobb, Jonathan Jenness
- Preceded by: A. B. W. Tenney, Thomas Keyes, William Hebard
- Succeeded by: A. B. W. Tenney, Simeon Short, William Hebard

10th Lieutenant Governor of Vermont
- In office 1831–1835
- Governor: William A. Palmer
- Preceded by: Mark Richards
- Succeeded by: Silas H. Jennison

Member of the Vermont House of Representatives from Randolph
- In office 1825–1827
- Preceded by: Dudley Chase
- Succeeded by: Jacob K. Parish

Personal details
- Born: May 4, 1773 Norwich, Connecticut
- Died: August 18, 1846 (aged 73) Randolph, Vermont
- Resting place: Randolph Center Cemetery, Randolph, Vermont
- Party: Anti-Masonic
- Spouse(s): Catharine Doty Egerton (1774–1826); Elizabeth Potter Egerton (1781–1848)
- Profession: Farmer

Military service
- Branch/service: United States Army; Vermont Militia
- Rank: Captain
- Battles/wars: War of 1812: Plattsburgh campaign

Lebbeus Egerton (May 4, 1773 – August 18, 1846) was a militia officer and farmer who served as the tenth lieutenant governor of Vermont from 1831 to 1835.

== Biography ==
Lebbeus Egerton was born in Norwich, Connecticut, on May 4, 1773. His family moved to Randolph, Vermont, in the early 1780s and Egerton became a farmer.

During the War of 1812 Egerton served as a captain. Initially commissioned in the 31st United States Infantry Regiment, Egerton subsequently raised and commanded a company in the Vermont militia during the Plattsburgh campaign, with Martin Flint as his second in command. Egerton later served as adjutant of a regiment.

Egerton served in the Vermont House of Representatives from 1825 to 1827, and was a delegate to the 1828 Vermont constitutional convention. He was Randolph's Town Clerk from 1830 to 1833. During his life Egerton also served in other local offices, including town Selectman.

Active as an Anti-Mason, in 1831 Egerton was elected Lieutenant Governor and he served until 1835. Because the annual elections were three way races, Egerton did not receive the majority required by the Vermont constitution, so he was chosen each year by the Vermont Legislature.

During the early to mid-1830s Egerton was responsible for designing and overseeing construction of the second Vermont State House.

From 1837 to 1838 and 1839 to 1840, Egerton served in the Vermont Senate.

Egerton died in Randolph on August 18, 1846, and was buried in Randolph Center Cemetery.

His Randolph Center home still stands and is a privately owned residence.

== Other ==
His first name is sometimes written "Lebberis", "Libbeus" or "Lebbons", and his surname sometimes appears in records as "Edgerton".

Party political offices
First	Anti-Masonic nominee for Lieutenant Governor of Vermont; 1830, 1831, 1832, 1833, 1834	Succeeded by Silas H. Jennison
Political offices
Preceded by Mark Richards	Lieutenant Governor of Vermont; 1831–1835	Succeeded by Silas H. Jennison
