= List of United States representatives in the 18th Congress =

This is a complete list of United States representatives during the 18th United States Congress listed by seniority. For the most part, representatives are ranked by the beginning of their terms in office.

As an historical article, the districts and party affiliations listed reflect those during the 18th Congress (March 4, 1823 – March 3, 1825). Seats and party affiliations on similar lists for other congresses will be different for certain members.

This article describes the criteria for seniority in the House of Representatives and sets out the list of members by seniority. It is prepared on the basis of the interpretation of seniority applied to the House of Representatives in the current congress. In the absence of information to the contrary, it is presumed that the twenty-first-century practice is identical to the seniority customs used during the 18th Congress.

== House seniority ==
Seniority in the House, for representatives with unbroken service, depends on the date on which the members first term began. That date is either the start of the Congress (4 March in odd numbered years, for the era up to and including the 73rd Congress starting in 1933) or the date of a special election during the Congress. Since many members start serving on the same day as others, ranking between them is based on alphabetical order by the last name of the representative.

Representatives in early congresses were often elected after the legal start of the Congress. Such representatives are attributed with unbroken seniority, from the legal start of the congressional term, if they were the first person elected to a seat in a Congress. The date of the election is indicated in a note.

The seniority date is normally taken from the members entry in the Biographical Directory of the United States Congress, except where the date given is the legal start of the Congress and the actual election (for someone who was not the first person elected to the seat in that Congress) was later. The date of election is taken from United States Congressional Elections 1788-1997. In a few instances the latter work provides dates, for the start and end of terms, which correct those in the Biographical Directory.

The Biographical Directory normally uses the date of a special election, as the seniority date. However, mostly in early congresses, the date of the member taking his seat can be the one given. The date of the special election is mentioned in a note to the list below, when that date is not used as the seniority date by the Biographical Directory.

Representatives who returned to the House, after having previously served, are credited with service equal to one less than the total number of terms they served. When a representative has served a prior term of less than two terms (i.e. prior term minus one equals less than one), he is ranked above all others whose service begins on the same day.

== Leadership ==
In this Congress the only formal leader was the speaker of the House. A speakership election was held on December 1, 1823. Henry Clay (A-DR, KY) was elected in the only ballot. He had been speaker for all or part of the 12th to 16th Congresses, but had not been a member of the 17th Congress.

In the ballot, Clay received 139 votes and Philip P. Barbour (C-DR, VA) got 42 votes. Congressman Barbour had been the speaker in the 17th Congress.

The title Dean of the House (sometimes known, in the nineteenth century, as Father of the House) was held by the member with the longest continuous service. It was not a formal leadership position.

== Standing committees ==
The House created its first standing committee, on April 13, 1789. There were twenty-five standing committees, listed in the rules used by the 18th Congress.

Committees, in this period, were normally appointed for a session at a time by the speaker. However the resolution of March 30, 1816, which created the committees on departmental expenditures and Expenditures on Public Buildings, provided for those standing committees to be appointed for the whole Congress.

This list refers to the standing committees of the House in the 18th Congress, the year of establishment as a standing committee, the number of members assigned to the committee and the dates of appointment in each session (or if appropriate for the Congress), the end of the session (if appropriate) and its chairman. Chairmen, who were re-appointed after serving in the previous Congress, are indicated by an *.

The first session was December 1, 1823 – May 27, 1824 (178 days) and the second session was December 6, 1824 – March 3, 1825 (88 days).

No.	Committee	From	Members	Term	Chairman
1	Accounts	1805	3	December 3, 1823 – May 27, 1824	*Samuel C. Allen (A-F, MA)
1	Accounts	1805	3	December 7, 1824 – March 3, 1825	*Samuel C. Allen (A-F, MA)
2	Agriculture	1820	7	December 3, 1823 – May 27, 1824	Stephen Van Rensselaer (A-F, NY)
2	Agriculture	1820	7	December 7, 1824 – March 3, 1825	Stephen Van Rensselaer (A-F, NY)
3	Claims	1794	7	December 3, 1823 – May 27, 1824	*Lewis Williams (C-DR, NC)
3	Claims	1794	7	December 7, 1824 – March 3, 1825	*Lewis Williams (C-DR, NC)
4	Commerce	1795	7	December 3, 1823 – May 27, 1824	*Thomas Newton Jr. (A-DR, VA)
4	Commerce	1795	7	December 7, 1824 – March 3, 1825	*Thomas Newton Jr. (A-DR, VA)
5	District of Columbia	1808	7	December 3, 1823 – May 27, 1824	*Joseph Kent (A-DR, MD)
5	District of Columbia	1808	7	December 7, 1824 – March 3, 1825	*Joseph Kent (A-DR, MD)
6	Elections	1789	7	December 3, 1823 – May 27, 1824	*John Sloane (A-DR, OH)
6	Elections	1789	7	December 7, 1824 – March 3, 1825	*John Sloane (A-DR, OH)
7	Expenditures in the Navy Department	1816	3	December 3, 1823-March 3, 1825	*Samuel Edwards (J-F, PA)
8	Expenditures in the Post Office Department	1816	3	December 3, 1823-March 3, 1825	William W. Van Wyk (A-DR, NY)
9	Expenditures in the State Department	1816	3	December 3, 1823-March 3, 1825	*Silas Wood (A-DR, NY)
10	Expenditures in the Treasury Department	1816	3	December 3, 1823-March 3, 1825	Weldon N. Edwards (C-DR, NC)
11	Expenditures in the War Department	1816	3	December 3, 1823-March 3, 1825	*George Tucker (C-DR, VA)
12	Expenditures on Public Buildings	1816	3	December 3, 1823-March 3, 1825	*Jeremiah Nelson (A-F, MA)
13	Foreign Affairs	1822	7	December 3, 1823 – May 27, 1824	John Forsyth (C-DR, GA)
13	Foreign Affairs	1822	7	December 7, 1824 – March 3, 1825	John Forsyth (C-DR, GA)
14	Indian Affairs	1821	7	December 3, 1823 – May 27, 1824	John Cocke (J-DR, TN)
14	Indian Affairs	1821	7	December 7, 1824 – March 3, 1825	John Cocke (J-DR, TN)
15	Judiciary	1813	7	December 3, 1823 – May 27, 1824	Daniel Webster (A-F, MA)
15	Judiciary	1813	7	December 7, 1824 – March 3, 1825	Daniel Webster (A-F, MA)
16	Manufactures	1819	7	December 3, 1823 – May 27, 1824	*John Tod (J-DR, PA)
16	Manufactures	1819	7	December 7, 1824 – March 3, 1825	Walter Forward (J-DR, PA)
17	Military Affairs	1822	7	December 3, 1823 – May 27, 1824	James Hamilton Jr. (J-DR, SC)
17	Military Affairs	1822	7	December 7, 1824 – March 3, 1825	James Hamilton Jr. (J-DR, SC)
18	Naval Affairs	1822	7	December 3, 1823 – May 27, 1824	Benjamin W. Crowninshield (A-DR, MA)
18	Naval Affairs	1822	7	December 7, 1824 – March 3, 1825	Benjamin W. Crowninshield (A-DR, MA)
19	Pensions and Revolutionary Claims	1813	7	December 3, 1823 – May 27, 1824	Peter Little (J-DR, MD)
19	Pensions and Revolutionary Claims	1813	7	December 7, 1824 – March 3, 1825	Peter Little (J-DR, MD)
20	Post Office and Post Roads	1808	7	December 3, 1823 – May 27, 1824	*Francis Johnson (A-DR, KY)
20	Post Office and Post Roads	1808	7	December 7, 1824 – March 3, 1825	John T. Johnson (J-DR, KY)
21	Private Land Claims	1816	7	December 3, 1823 – May 27, 1824	*John W. Campbell (J-DR, OH)
21	Private Land Claims	1816	7	December 7, 1824 – March 3, 1825	*John W. Campbell (J-DR, OH)
22	Public Expenditures	1814	7	December 3, 1823 – May 27, 1824	Thomas W. Cobb (C-DR, GA)
22	Public Expenditures	1814	7	December 7, 1824 – March 3, 1825	Duncan McArthur (A-DR, OH)
23	Public Lands	1805	7	December 3, 1823 – May 27, 1824	*Christopher Rankin (J-DR, MS)
23	Public Lands	1805	7	December 7, 1824 – March 3, 1825	*Christopher Rankin (J-DR, MS)
24	Revisal and Unfinished Business	1795	3	December 3, 1823 – May 27, 1824	*Thomas R. Ross (C-DR, OH)
24	Revisal and Unfinished Business	1795	3	December 7, 1824 – March 3, 1825	Samuel Lathrop (A-F, MA)
25	Ways and Means	1802	7	December 3, 1823 – May 27, 1824	*Louis McLane (C-F, DE)
25	Ways and Means	1802	7	December 7, 1824 – March 3, 1825	*Louis McLane (C-F, DE)

== List of representatives by seniority ==
A numerical rank is assigned to each of the 213 members initially elected to the 18th Congress. Other members, who were not the first person elected to a seat but who joined the House during the Congress, are not assigned a number.

Four representatives-elect were not sworn in. Three resigned (MD-5:Smith, MA-10, NY-28) and one was unseated after an election contest (NY-29). The list below includes the representatives-elect (with name in italics), with the seniority they would have held if sworn in.

Party designations used in this article are DR for Democratic-Republican members and F for Federalist representatives. For the 18th Congress only, each party is further divided based upon the presidential candidates supported. The prefixes used are A- for Adams-Clay supporters, C- for the followers of Crawford and J- for the Jackson men. Designations used for service in the first three congresses are (A) for Anti-Administration members and (P) for Pro-Administration representatives.

U.S. House seniority
Rank	Representative	Party	District	Seniority date	Notes	
Twelve consecutive terms
1	Thomas Newton Jr.	A-DR	VA-1	March 4, 1801	Elected to this Congress: March 31-April 30, 1823. Dean of the House. Chairman: Commerce.	
Eleven non-consecutive terms
2	John Randolph	C-DR	VA-5	March 4, 1819	Previously served (DR) 1799-1813 and 1815-17 while in the House. Elected to this Congress: March 31-April 30, 1823.	
Ten non-consecutive terms
3	Samuel Smith	C-DR	MD-5	January 31, 1816	Previously served (A) 1793-95 and (DR) 1795-1803 while in the House. Resigned, as Representative-elect, to become US Senator: December 17, 1822.	
Eight non-consecutive terms
4	Burwell Bassett	C-DR	VA-8	March 4, 1821	Previously served (DR) 1805-13 and 1815–19. Elected to this Congress: March 31-April 30, 1823	
Seven consecutive terms
5	William McCoy	C-DR	VA-19	March 4, 1811	Elected to this Congress: March 31-April 30, 1823	
Six consecutive terms
6	John W. Taylor	A-DR	NY-17	March 4, 1813		
7	Philip P. Barbour	C-DR	VA-11	September 19, 1814	Elected to this Congress: March 31-April 30, 1823. Last term while serving in the House until 20th Congress.	
Six non-consecutive terms
8	Jeremiah Nelson	A-F	MA-3	March 4, 1815	Previously served (F) 1805–07. Chairman: Expenditures on Public Buildings. Last term while serving in the House until 22nd Congress.	
9	Peter Little	J-DR	MD-5	September 2, 1816	Previously served (DR) 1811-13 while in the House. Chairman: Pensions and Revolutionary Claims.	
10	Henry Clay	A-DR	KY-3	March 4, 1823	Previously served (DR) 1811-January 19, 1814, 1815 and October 30, 1815-21 while in the House. Speaker of the House.	
Five consecutive terms
11	Lewis Williams	C-DR	NC-13	March 4, 1815	Elected to this Congress: August 13, 1823. Chairman: Claims.	
12	Weldon N. Edwards	C-DR	NC-6	February 7, 1816	Elected to this Congress: August 13, 1823. Chairman: Expenditures in the Treasury Department.	
Five non-consecutive terms
13	Joseph Kent	A-DR	MD-2	March 4, 1819	Previously served (DR) 1811-15 while in the House. Chairman: District of Columbia.	
14	Charles Rich	A-DR	VT-al	March 4, 1817	Previously served (DR) 1813-15 while in the House. Died: October 15, 1824.	
15	John Culpepper	A-F	NC-7	March 4, 1823	Previously served (F) 1807-January 2, 1808 while in the House, February 23, 1808–09, 1813–17 and 1819–21. Elected to this Congress: August 14, 1823. Last term while serving in the House until 20th Congress.	
16	Lewis Condict	J-DR	NJ-al	October 9, 1821	Previously served (DR) 1811-17 while in the House.	
17	William Eustis	DR	MA-10	August 21, 1820	Previously served (DR) 1801-05 while in the House. Resigned, as Representative-elect, to become Governor: c. April 1823.	
18	John Forsyth	C-DR	GA-al	March 4, 1823	Previously served (DR) 1813-November 23, 1818 (resigned as Representative to 15th and Representative-elect to 16th Congress). Chairman: Foreign Affairs.	
Four consecutive terms
19	Joel Abbot	C-DR	GA-al	March 4, 1817	Last term while serving in the House.	
20	Samuel C. Allen	A-F	MA-7	March 4, 1817	Chairman: Accounts	
21	William L. Ball	C-DR	VA-13	March 4, 1817	Elected to this Congress: March 31-April 30, 1823. Died while still serving in the House: February 29, 1824.	
22	John W. Campbell	J-DR	OH-5	March 4, 1817	Chairman: Private Land Claims	
23	Samuel C. Crafts	A-DR	VT-al	March 4, 1817	Last term while serving in the House.	
24	John Floyd	C-DR	VA-20	March 4, 1817	Elected to this Congress: March 31-April 30, 1823	
25	Timothy Fuller	A-DR	MA-4	March 4, 1817	Last term while serving in the House.	
26	Robert S. Garnett	C-DR	VA-12	March 4, 1817	Elected to this Congress: March 31-April 30, 1823	
27	Thomas H. Hall	C-DR	NC-3	March 4, 1817	Elected to this Congress: August 14, 1823. Last term while serving in the House until 20th Congress.	
28	Louis McLane	C-F	DE-al	March 4, 1817	Chairman: Ways and Means	
29	Charles F. Mercer	C-DR	VA-14	March 4, 1817	Previously served (F) 1817–23. Elected to this Congress: March 31-April 30, 1823.	
30	Thomas Patterson	J-DR	PA-15	March 4, 1817	Last term while serving in the House.	
31	Alexander Smyth	C-DR	VA-22	March 4, 1817	Elected to this Congress: March 31-April 30, 1823. Last term while serving in the House until 20th Congress.	
32	David Trimble	A-DR	KY-1	March 4, 1817		
33	Starling Tucker	J-DR	SC-9	March 4, 1817		
34	Thomas J. Rogers	J-DR	PA-8	March 3, 1818	Died while still serving in the House: April 20, 1824	
35	Enoch Lincoln	A-DR	ME-5	November 4, 1818	Previously served (DR-MA) November 4, 1818–21. Elected to this Congress: April 7, 1823.	
Four non-consecutive terms
36	Joseph Hemphill	J-F	PA-2	March 4, 1819	Previously served (F) 1801-03 while in the House.	
37	Edward Livingston	J-DR	LA-1	March 4, 1823	Previously served (DR-NY) 1795-1801 while in the House.	
38	John Reed Jr.	A-F	MA-13	March 4, 1821	Previously served (F) 1813-17 while in the House.	
39	James Stephenson	C-F	VA-16	October 28, 1822	Previously served (F) 1803-05 and 1809-11 while in the House. Elected to this Congress: March 31-April 30, 1823. Last term while serving in the House.	
40	Charles Hooks	C-DR	NC-5	March 4, 1819	Previously served (DR) December 2, 1816–17. Elected to this Congress: August 14, 1823. Last term while serving in the House.	
41	Alfred Cuthbert	C-DR	GA-al	March 4, 1821	Previously served (DR) December 13, 1813 – November 9, 1816 while in the House.	
42	Samuel D. Ingham	J-DR	PA-8	October 8, 1822	Previously served (DR) 1813-July 6, 1818 while in the House.	
43	Daniel Udree	J-DR	PA-7	December 10, 1822	Previously served (DR) October 12, 1813–15 and December 26, 1820-21 while in the House. Last term while serving in the House.	
Three consecutive terms
44	Mark Alexander	C-DR	VA-4	March 4, 1819	Elected to this Congress: March 31-April 30, 1823	
45	Robert Allen	J-DR	TN-5	March 4, 1819	Elected to this Congress: August 7–8, 1823	
46	Hutchins G. Burton	C-DR	NC-2	March 4, 1819	Elected to this Congress: August 14, 1823. Resigned to become Governor: December 4, 1824.	
47	John Cocke	J-DR	TN-2	March 4, 1819	Elected to this Congress: August 7–8, 1823. Chairman: Indian Affairs.	
48	Daniel P. Cook	A-DR	IL-al	March 4, 1819		
49	Joshua Cushman	A-DR	ME-4	March 4, 1819	Previously served (DR-MA) 1819–21. Elected to this Congress: June 30, 1823. Last term while serving in the House.	
50	Samuel Eddy	A-DR	RI-al	March 4, 1819	Last term while serving in the House.	
51	Samuel Edwards	J-F	PA-4	March 4, 1819	Chairman: Expenditures in the Navy Department	
52	Samuel Lathrop	A-F	MA-8	March 4, 1819	Chairman: Revisal and Unfinished Business (1824–25)	
53	Thomas Metcalfe	A-DR	KY-2	March 4, 1819		
54	Raphael Neale	A-F	MD-1	March 4, 1819	Last term while serving in the House.	
55	William Plumer Jr.	A-DR	NH-al	March 4, 1819	Last term while serving in the House.	
56	Christopher Rankin	J-DR	MS-al	March 4, 1819	Chairman: Public Lands	
57	Thomas R. Ross	C-DR	OH-2	March 4, 1819	Chairman: Revisal and Unfinished Business (1823–24). Last term while serving in the House.	
58	John Sloane	A-DR	OH-12	March 4, 1819	Chairman: Elections	
59	Gideon Tomlinson	A-DR	CT-al	March 4, 1819	Elected to this Congress: April 7, 1823	
60	Albert H. Tracy	A-DR	NY-30	March 4, 1819	Last term while serving in the House.	
61	George Tucker	C-DR	VA-6	March 4, 1819	Elected to this Congress: March 31-April 30, 1823. Chairman: Expenditures in the War Department. Last term while serving in the House.	
62	Henry R. Warfield	A-F	MD-3	March 4, 1819	Last term while serving in the House.	
63	Jared Williams	C-DR	VA-17	March 4, 1819	Elected to this Congress: March 31-April 30, 1823. Last term while serving in the House.	
64	Silas Wood	A-DR	NY-1	March 4, 1819	Previously (F) 1819-23 while in the House. Chairman: Expenditures in the State Department.	
65	William S. Archer	C-DR	VA-3	January 3, 1820	Elected to this Congress: March 31-April 30, 1823	
66	Rollin C. Mallary	A-DR	VT-al	January 13, 1820		
67	Francis Johnson	A-DR	KY-10	November 13, 1820	Chairman: Post Office and Post Roads (1823–24)	
68	Aaron Hobart	A-DR	MA-11	November 24, 1820		
Three non-consecutive terms
69	Philemon Beecher	A-DR	OH-9	March 4, 1823	Previously served (F) 1817-21 while in the House.	
70	Thomas W. Cobb	C-DR	GA-al	March 4, 1823	Previously served (DR) 1817–21. Chairman: Public Expenditures (1823–24). Resigned while still serving in the House: December 6, 1824.	
71	Arthur Livermore	A-DR	NH-al	March 4, 1823	Previously served (DR) 1817-21 while in the House. Elected to this Congress: March 11, 1823. Last term while serving in the House.	
72	Henry R. Storrs	A-F	NY-14	March 4, 1823	Previously served (F) 1817-21 while in the House.	
73	Daniel Webster	A-F	MA-1	March 4, 1823	Previously served (F-NH) 1813-17 while in the House. Chairman: Judiciary.	
74	Isaac Williams Jr.	A-DR	NY-13	March 4, 1823	Previously served (DR) December 20, 1813–15 and 1817–19. Last term while serving in the House.	
Two consecutive terms
75	Noyes Barber	A-DR	CT-al	March 4, 1821	Elected to this Congress: April 7, 1823	
76	Francis Baylies	J-F	MA-12	March 4, 1821		
77	John Brown	J-DR	PA-12	March 4, 1821	Last term while serving in the House.	
78	James Buchanan	J-F	PA-4	March 4, 1821		
79	George Cassedy	J-DR	NJ-al	March 4, 1821		
80	Henry W. Connor	J-DR	NC-11	March 4, 1821		Elected to this Congress: August 14, 1823
81	Job Durfee	A-DR	RI-al	March 4, 1821	Last term while serving in the House.	
82	Henry W. Dwight	A-F	MA-9	March 4, 1821		
83	Patrick Farrelly	J-DR	PA-18	March 4, 1821		
84	Joseph Gist	J-DR	SC-7	March 4, 1821		
85	Matthew Harvey	A-DR	NH-al	March 4, 1821	Last term while serving in the House.	
86	Ebenezer Herrick	A-DR	ME-3	March 4, 1821	Elected to this Congress: September 8, 1823	
87	George Holcombe	J-DR	NJ-al	March 4, 1821		
88	John T. Johnson	J-DR	KY-5	March 4, 1821	Chairman: Post Office and Post Roads (1824–25). Last term while serving in the House.	
89	Jabez Leftwich	C-DR	VA-7	March 4, 1821	Elected to this Congress: March 31-April 30, 1823. Last term while serving in the House.	
90	John Long	C-DR	NC-10	March 4, 1821	Elected to this Congress: August 14, 1823	
91	James Matlack	A-DR	NJ-al	March 4, 1821	Last term while serving in the House.	
92	Aaron Matson	A-DR	NH-al	March 4, 1821	Last term while serving in the House.	
93	George McDuffie	J-DR	SC-5	March 4, 1821		
94	James S. Mitchell	J-DR	PA-10	March 4, 1821		
95	Gabriel Moore	J-DR	AL-1	March 4, 1821	Elected to this Congress: August 3, 1823	
96	George Plumer	J-DR	PA-17	March 4, 1821		
97	Joel R. Poinsett	J-DR	SC-1	March 4, 1821		
98	Romulus M. Saunders	C-DR	NC-9	March 4, 1821	Elected to this Congress: August 14, 1823	
99	Arthur Smith	C-DR	VA-2	March 4, 1821	Elected to this Congress: March 31-April 30, 1823. Last term while serving in the House.	
100	William Smith	C-DR	VA-21	March 4, 1821	Elected to this Congress: March 31-April 30, 1823	
101	Ansel Sterling	A-DR	CT-al	March 4, 1821	Elected to this Congress: April 7, 1823. Last term while serving in the House.	
102	Andrew Stevenson	C-DR	VA-9	March 4, 1821	Elected to this Congress: March 31-April 30, 1823	
103	Andrew Stewart	J-DR	PA-14	March 4, 1821		
104	Ebenezer Stoddard	A-DR	CT-al	March 4, 1821	Elected to this Congress: April 7, 1823. Last term while serving in the House.	
105	Samuel Swan	J-DR	NJ-al	March 4, 1821		
106	Edward F. Tattnall	C-DR	GA-al	March 4, 1821		
107	Wiley Thompson	C-DR	GA-al	March 4, 1821		
108	John Tod	J-DR	PA-13	March 4, 1821	Chairman: Manufactures (1823–24). Resigned while still serving in the House: 1824.	
109	Joseph Vance	A-DR	OH-4	March 4, 1821		
110	Thomas Whipple Jr.	A-DR	NH-al	March 4, 1821		
111	John Wilson	J-DR	SC-6	March 4, 1821		
112	John Scott	A-DR	MO-al	August 10, 1821	Previously served as Delegate: August 6, 1816 – January 13, 1817 and August 4, 1817–21	
113	John Findlay	J-DR	PA-11	October 9, 1821		
114	Churchill C. Cambreleng	C-DR	NY-3	December 3, 1821		
115	Elisha Litchfield	C-DR	NY-23	December 3, 1821	Last term while serving in the House.	
116	John J. Morgan	J-DR	NY-3	December 3, 1821	Last term while serving in the House until 23rd Congress.	
117	William B. Rochester	A-DR	NY-28	December 3, 1821	Resigned, as Representative-elect: 1823	
118	William W. Van Wyck	A-DR	NY-5	December 3, 1821	Chairman: Expenditures in the Post Office Department. Last term while serving in the House.	
119	Stephen Van Rensselaer	A-F	NY-10	February 27, 1822	Chairman: Agriculture	
120	Peter Sharpe	A-DR	NY-3	March 4, 1823	Previously served (DR) March 4-December 12, 1821. Last term while serving in the House.	
121	Walter Forward	J-DR	PA-16	October 8, 1822	Chairman: Manufactures (1824–25). Last term while serving in the House.	
122	Jonathan Jennings	J-DR	IN-2	December 2, 1822	Previously Delegate: November 27, 1809 – December 11, 1816	
123	Andrew R. Govan	J-DR	SC-4	December 4, 1822		
124	John Carter	J-DR	SC-8	December 11, 1822		
125	James Hamilton Jr.	J-DR	SC-2	December 13, 1822	Chairman: Military Affairs	
...	Isaac McKim	J-DR	MD-5	January 4, 1823	Last term until 23rd Congress	
126	William Cox Ellis	J-F	PA-9	March 4, 1823	Previously elected (F) to 17th Congress, but resigned before term started. Last term while serving in the House.	
127	John C. Wright	A-DR	OH-11	March 4, 1823	Previously elected (DR) to 17th Congress, but resigned before term started	
Two non-consecutive terms
128	William C. Bradley	A-DR	VT-al	March 4, 1823	Previously served (DR) 1813-15 while serving in the House.	
129	Samuel A. Foot	A-DR	CT-al	March 4, 1823	Elected to this Congress: April 7, 1823. Previously served (DR) 1819–21. Last term while serving in the House.	
130	John Herkimer	A-DR	NY-15	March 4, 1823	Previously served (DR) 1817–19. Last term while serving in the House.	
131	James B. Reynolds	J-DR	TN-8	March 4, 1823	Elected to this Congress: August 7–8, 1823. Previously served (DR) 1815–17. Last term while serving in the House.	
132	James Strong	A-F	NY-8	March 4, 1823	Previously served (F) 1819-21 while serving in the House.	
133	Duncan McArthur	A-DR	OH-6	March 4, 1823	Previously served (DR) March 4-April 5, 1813. Chairman: Public Expenditures. Last term while serving in the House.	
One term
134	Adam R. Alexander	J-DR	TN-9	March 4, 1823	Elected to this Congress: August 7–8, 1823	
135	James Allison Jr.	J-DR	PA-16	March 4, 1823		
136	John S. Barbour	C-DR	VA-15	March 4, 1823	Elected to this Congress: March 31-April 30, 1823	
137	Ichabod Bartlett	A-DR	NH-al	March 4, 1823		
138	Mordecai Bartley	A-DR	OH-14	March 4, 1823		
139	John Blair	J-DR	TN-1	March 4, 1823	Elected to this Congress: August 7–8, 1823	
140	Samuel Breck	A-F	PA-1	March 4, 1823	Only term while serving in the House.	
141	William L. Brent	A-DR	LA-3	March 4, 1823		
142	Daniel A. A. Buck	A-DR	VT-al	March 4, 1823	Only term while serving in the House. until 20th Congress	
143	Richard A. Buckner	A-DR	KY-8	March 4, 1823		
144	William Burleigh	A-DR	ME-1	March 4, 1823	Elected to this Congress: November 3, 1823	
145	John W. Cady	A-DR	NY-16	March 4, 1823	Only term while serving in the House.	
146	Robert B. Campbell	J-DR	SC-3	March 4, 1823	Only term while serving in the House until 23rd Congress	
147	George Cary	C-DR	GA-al	March 4, 1823		
148	Lot Clark	C-DR	NY-21	March 4, 1823	Only term while serving in the House.	
149	Ela Collins	C-DR	NY-20	March 4, 1823	Only term while serving in the House.	
150	Hector Craig	J-DR	NY-6	March 4, 1823	Only term while serving in the House until 21st Congress	
151	Benjamin W. Crowninshield	A-DR	MA-2	March 4, 1823	Chairman: Naval Affairs	
152	Rowland Day	C-DR	NY-24	March 4, 1823	Only term while serving in the House until 23rd Congress.	
153	Justin Dwinell	C-DR	NY-22	March 4, 1823	Only term while serving in the House.	
154	Lewis Eaton	C-DR	NY-12	March 4, 1823	Only term while serving in the House.	
155	Charles A. Foote	C-DR	NY-11	March 4, 1823	Only term while serving in the House.	
156	Joel Frost	C-DR	NY-4	March 4, 1823	Only term while serving in the House.	
157	Daniel Garrison	J-DR	NJ-al	March 4, 1823		
158	Alfred M. Gatlin	C-DR	NC-1	March 4, 1823	Elected to this Congress: August 13, 1823. Only term while serving in the House.	
159	James W. Gazlay	J-DR	OH-1	March 4, 1823	Only term while serving in the House.	
160	Henry H. Gurley	A-DR	LA-2	March 4, 1823		
161	Robert Harris	J-DR	PA-6	March 4, 1823		
162	Moses Hayden	A-DR	NY-27	March 4, 1823		
163	William Hayward Jr.	C-DR	MD-7	March 4, 1823	Only term while serving in the House.	
164	Robert P. Henry	J-DR	KY-12	March 4, 1823		
165	James L. Hogeboom	C-DR	NY-9	March 4, 1823	Only term while serving in the House.	
166	Samuel Houston	J-DR	TN-7	March 4, 1823	Elected to this Congress: August 7–8, 1823	
167	Jacob C. Isacks	J-DR	TN-4	March 4, 1823	Elected to this Congress: August 7–8, 1823	
168	Lemuel Jenkins	C-DR	NY-7	March 4, 1823	Only term while serving in the House.	
169	Joseph Johnson	J-DR	VA-18	March 4, 1823	Elected to this Congress: March 31-April 30, 1823	
170	David Kidder	A-DR	ME-7	March 4, 1823	Elected to this Congress: April 7, 1823	
171	George Kremer	J-DR	PA-9	March 4, 1823		
172	Samuel Lawrence	A-DR	NY-25	March 4, 1823	Only term while serving in the House.	
173	John Lee	J-F	MD-4	March 4, 1823	Only term while serving in the House.	
174	Robert P. Letcher	A-DR	KY-4	March 4, 1823		
175	John Locke	A-DR	MA-6	March 4, 1823	Elected to this Congress: May 12, 1823	
176	Stephen Longfellow	A-F	ME-2	March 4, 1823	Elected to this Congress: April 7, 1823. Only term while serving in the House.	
177	Willie P. Mangum	C-DR	NC-8	March 4, 1823	Elected to this Congress: August 13, 1823	
178	Philip S. Markley	J-DR	PA-5	March 4, 1823		
179	Henry C. Martindale	A-F	NY-18	March 4, 1823		
180	Dudley Marvin	A-DR	NY-26	March 4, 1823		
181	Samuel McKean	J-DR	PA-9	March 4, 1823		
182	John McKee	J-DR	AL-2	March 4, 1823	Elected to this Congress: August 3, 1823	
183	William McLean	A-DR	OH-3	March 4, 1823		
184	Daniel H. Miller	J-DR	PA-3	March 4, 1823		
185	George E. Mitchell	A-DR	MD-6	March 4, 1823		
186	Thomas P. Moore	J-DR	KY-7	March 4, 1823		
187	Jeremiah O'Brien	A-DR	ME-6	March 4, 1823	Elected to this Congress: September 8, 1823	
188	George W. Owen	J-DR	AL-3	March 4, 1823	Elected to this Congress: August 3, 1823	
189	John Patterson	A-DR	OH-10	March 4, 1823	Only term while serving in the House.	
190	William Prince	J-DR	IN-1	March 4, 1823	Died while still serving in the House: September 8, 1824	
191	John Richards	C-DR	NY-19	March 4, 1823	Only term while serving in the House.	
192	William C. Rives	C-DR	VA-10	March 4, 1823	Elected to this Congress: March 31-April 30, 1823	
193	Robert S. Rose	A-DR	NY-26	March 4, 1823		
194	James T. Sandford	J-DR	TN-6	March 4, 1823	Elected to this Congress: August 7–8, 1823. Only term.	
195	Jonas Sibley	A-DR	MA-5	March 4, 1823	Only term while serving in the House.	
196	Richard D. Spaight Jr.	C-DR	NC-4	March 4, 1823	Elected to this Congress: August 13, 1823. Only term while serving in the House.	
197	John S. Spence	A-DR	MD-8	March 4, 1823	Only term while serving in the House until 22nd Congress	
198	James I. Standifer	J-DR	TN-3	March 4, 1823	Elected to this Congress: August 7–8, 1823. Only term while serving in the House until 21st Congress.	
199	Egbert E. Ten Eyck	C-DR	NY-20	March 4, 1823		
200	John Test	J-DR	IN-3	March 4, 1823		
201	Philip Thompson	A-DR	KY-11	March 4, 1823	Only term while serving in the House.	
202	Jacob Tyson	C-DR	NY-2	March 4, 1823	Only term while serving in the House.	
203	Robert B. Vance	J-DR	NC-12	March 4, 1823	Elected to this Congress: August 13, 1823. Only term while serving in the House.	
204	Samuel F. Vinton	A-DR	OH-7	March 4, 1823		
205	Isaac Wayne	J-F	PA-4	March 4, 1823	Only term while serving in the House.	
206	David White	A-DR	KY-6	March 4, 1823	Only term while serving in the House.	
207	Lemuel Whitman	A-DR	CT-al	March 4, 1823	Elected to this Congress: April 7, 1823. Only term while serving in the House.	
208	Elisha Whittlesey	A-DR	OH-13	March 4, 1823		
209	Charles A. Wickliffe	J-DR	KY-9	March 4, 1823		
210	Henry Wilson	J-DR	PA-7	March 4, 1823		
211	Isaac Wilson	A-DR	NY-29	March 4, 1823	Unseated, as Representative-elect, after election contest: January 7, 1824	
212	James Wilson	J-DR	PA-11	March 4, 1823		
213	William Wilson	C-DR	OH-8	March 4, 1823		
Members joining the House, after the start of the Congress
...	William Woods	A-DR	NY-28	November 3, 1823	Special election: November 3–5, 1823. Only term while serving in the House.	
...	Parmenio Adams	A-DR	NY-29	January 7, 1824	Seated, after election contest	
...	John Taliaferro	C-DR	VA-13	March 24, 1824	Previously served (DR) 1801-03 and December 2, 1811-13 while in the House. Special election.	
...	Alexander Thomson	J-DR	PA-13	December 6, 1824	Special election: October 12, 1824	
...	George Wolf	J-DR	PA-8	December 9, 1824	Special election: October 12, 1824	
...	John Bailey	A-DR	MA-10	December 13, 1824	Special election: November 29, 1824	
...	Henry Olin	A-DR	VT-al	December 13, 1824	Special election: November 22, 1824. Only term while serving in the House.	
...	Jacob Call	J-DR	IN-1	December 23, 1824	Special election: November 8, 1824. Only term while serving in the House.	
...	George Outlaw	C-DR	NC-2	January 19, 1825	Special election: January 6, 1825. Only term while serving in the House.	
...	Richard H. Wilde	C-DR	GA-al	February 7, 1825	Previously served (DR) 1815-17 while in the House. Special election: December 13, 1824. Last term while serving in the House until 20th Congress.	
Non voting members
a	Richard K. Call	-	FL-al	March 4, 1823	Delegate from Florida Territory. Only term while serving in the House.	
b	Henry W. Conway	-	AR-al	March 4, 1823	Delegate from Arkansas Territory	
c	Gabriel Richard	-	MI-al	March 4, 1823	Delegate from Michigan Territory. Only term while serving in the House.	

== See also ==
- 18th United States Congress
- List of United States congressional districts
- List of United States senators in the 18th Congress
