= List of United States representatives in the 15th Congress =

This is a complete list of United States representatives during the 15th United States Congress listed by seniority. For the most part, representatives are ranked by the beginning of their terms in office.

As an historical article, the districts and party affiliations listed reflect those during the 15th Congress (March 4, 1817 – March 3, 1819). Seats and party affiliations on similar lists for other congresses will be different for certain members.

This article describes the criteria for seniority in the House of Representatives and sets out the list of members by seniority. It is prepared on the basis of the interpretation of seniority applied to the House of Representatives in the current congress. In the absence of information to the contrary, it is presumed that the twenty-first-century practice is identical to the seniority customs used during the 15th Congress.

== House seniority ==
Seniority in the House, for representatives with unbroken service, depends on the date on which the members first term began. That date is either the start of the Congress (4 March in odd numbered years, for the era up to and including the 73rd Congress starting in 1933) or the date of a special election during the Congress. Since many members start serving on the same day as others, ranking between them is based on alphabetical order by the last name of the representative.

Representatives in early congresses were often elected after the legal start of the Congress. Such representatives are attributed with unbroken seniority, from the legal start of the congressional term, if they were the first person elected to a seat in a Congress. The date of the election is indicated in a note.

The seniority date is normally taken from the members entry in the Biographical Directory of the United States Congress, except where the date given is the legal start of the Congress and the actual election (for someone who was not the first person elected to the seat in that Congress) was later. The date of election is taken from United States Congressional Elections 1788-1997. In a few instances the latter work provides dates, for the start and end of terms, which correct those in the Biographical Directory.

The Biographical Directory normally uses the date of a special election, as the seniority date. However, mostly in early congresses, the date of the member taking his seat can be the one given. The date of the special election is mentioned in a note to the list below, when that date is not used as the seniority date by the Biographical Directory.

Representatives who returned to the House, after having previously served, are credited with service equal to one less than the total number of terms they served. When a representative has served a prior term of less than two terms (i.e. prior term minus one equals less than one), he is ranked above all others whose service begins on the same day.

== Leadership ==
In this Congress the only formal leader was the speaker of the House. A speakership ballot was held on December 1, 1817, and Henry Clay (DR-KY) was re-elected for a fourth consecutive Congress (although he had resigned, during the 13th Congress on January 19, 1814, so his service had not been continuous). Henry Clay received 143 votes, Samuel Smith (DR-MD) received 6 and 1 was blank.

The title Dean of the House (sometimes known, in the nineteenth century, as Father of the House) was held by the member with the longest continuous service. It was not a leadership position.

== Standing committees ==
The House created its first standing committee, on April 13, 1789. There were nineteen standing committees, listed in the rules initially used by the 15th Congress. No additional committees were added during the Congress.

Committees, in this period, were normally appointed for a session at a time by the speaker. However the resolution of March 30, 1816, which created the committees on departmental expenditures and Expenditures on Public Buildings, provided for those standing committees to be appointed for the whole Congress.

This list refers to the standing committees of the House in the 15th Congress, the year of establishment as a standing committee, the number of members assigned to the committee and the dates of appointment in each session (or if appropriate for the Congress), the end of the session (if appropriate) and its chairman. Chairmen, who were re-appointed after serving in the previous Congress, are indicated by an *.

The first session was December 1, 1817 – April 20, 1818 (141 days) and the second session was November 16, 1818 – March 3, 1819 (108 days).

No.	Committee	From	Members	Appointed	Chairman
1	Accounts	1805	3	December 3, 1817 – April 20, 1818	*Peter Little (DR-MD)
1	Accounts	1805	3	November 17, 1818 – March 3, 1819	*Peter Little (DR-MD)
2	Claims	1794	7	December 3, 1817 – April 20, 1818	Lewis Williams (DR-NC)
2	Claims	1794	7	November 17, 1818 – March 3, 1819	Lewis Williams (DR-NC)
3	Commerce and Manufactures	1795	7	December 3, 1817 – April 20, 1818	*Thomas Newton, Jr. (DR-VA)
3	Commerce and Manufactures	1795	7	November 17, 1818 – March 3, 1819	*Thomas Newton, Jr. (DR-VA)
4	District of Columbia	1808	7	December 3, 1817 – April 20, 1818	John C. Herbert (F-MD)
4	District of Columbia	1808	7	November 17, 1818 – March 3, 1819	John C. Herbert (F-MD)
5	Elections	1789	7	December 3, 1817 – April 20, 1818	*John W. Taylor (DR-NY)
5	Elections	1789	7	November 17, 1818 – March 3, 1819	*John W. Taylor (DR-NY)
6	Expenditures in the Navy Department	1816	3	December 3, 1817-March 3, 1819	James Pleasants (DR-VA)
7	Expenditures in the Post Office Department	1816	3	December 3, 1817-March 3, 1819	Samuel D. Ingham (DR-PA) (a)
8	Expenditures in the State Department	1816	3	December 3, 1817-March 3, 1819	John Forsyth (DR-GA) (b)
9	Expenditures in the Treasury Department	1816	3	December 3, 1817-March 3, 1819	William Lowndes (DR-SC)
10	Expenditures in the War Department	1816	3	December 3, 1817-March 3, 1819	Richard M. Johnson (DR-KY)
11	Expenditures on Public Buildings	1816	3	December 3, 1817-March 3, 1819	Henry S. Tucker (DR-VA)
12	Judiciary	1813	7	December 3, 1817 – April 20, 1818	*Hugh Nelson (DR-VA)
12	Judiciary	1813	7	November 17, 1818 – March 3, 1819	*Hugh Nelson (DR-VA)
13	Pensions and Revolutionary Claims	1813	7	December 3, 1817 – April 20, 1818	John Rhea (DR-TN)
13	Pensions and Revolutionary Claims	1813	7	November 17, 1818 – March 3, 1819	John Rhea (DR-TN)
14	Post Office and Post Roads	1808	7	December 3, 1817 – April 20, 1818	*Samuel D. Ingham (DR-PA)
14	Post Office and Post Roads	1808	7	November 17, 1818 – March 3, 1819	Arthur Livermore (DR-NH)
15	Private Land Claims	1816	5	December 3, 1817-April 20, 1818	Samuel Herrick (DR-OH)
15	Private Land Claims	1816	7	November 17, 1818 – March 3, 1819	George Robertson (DR-KY)
16	Public Expenditures	1814	7	December 3, 1817 – April 20, 1818	Joseph Desha (DR-KY)
16	Public Expenditures	1814	7	November 17, 1818 – March 3, 1819	Joseph Desha (DR-KY)
17	Public Lands	1805	7	December 3, 1817 – April 20, 1818	*Thomas B. Robertson (DR-LA)
17	Public Lands	1805	7	November 17, 1818 – March 3, 1819	George Poindexter (DR-MS)
18	Revisal and Unfinished Business	1795	3	December 3, 1817 – April 20, 1818	John Savage (DR-NY)
18	Revisal and Unfinished Business	1795	3	November 17, 1818 – March 3, 1819	John W. Taylor (DR-NY)
19	Ways and Means	1802	7	December 3, 1817 – April 20, 1818	*William Lowndes (DR-SC)
19	Ways and Means	1802	7	November 17, 1818 – March 3, 1819	Samuel Smith (DR-MD)

Note:-

- (a) Resigned from the House: July 6, 1818. Thomas H. Hubbard (DR-NY) became Chairman for the rest of the Congress.
- (b) Resigned from the House: November 28, 1818. Josiah Hasbrouck (DR-NY) became Chairman for the rest of the Congress.

== List of representatives by seniority ==
A numerical rank is assigned to each of the 183 members initially elected to the 15th Congress. Other members, who were not the first person elected to a seat but who joined the House during the Congress, are not assigned a number (except for the representative from the newly admitted states of Mississippi and Illinois, who are assigned the numbers 184 and 185 respectively).

7 representatives-elect were not sworn in. 1 declined to serve (CT-al: Dennison), 4 of them died (CT-al: Backus;NY-4;NC-7;PA-10: Scott) and 2 resigned (MA-1;SC-5). The list below includes the representatives-elect (with name in italics), with the seniority they would have held if sworn in.

Party designations used in this article are DR for Democratic-Republican members and F for Federalist representatives. Designations used for service in the first three congresses are (A) for Anti-Administration members and (P) for Pro-Administration representatives.

U.S. House seniority
Rank	Representative	Party	District	Seniority date	Notes
Nine consecutive terms
1	Thomas Newton, Jr.	DR	VA-21	March 4, 1801	Elected to this Congress: April 1817. Dean of the House. Chairman: Commerce and Manufactures.
Eight consecutive terms
2	Peterson Goodwyn	DR	VA-19	March 4, 1803	Elected to this Congress: April 1817. Died while still serving as a member of the House: February 21, 1818.
Eight non-consecutive terms
3	Anthony New	DR	KY-5	March 4, 1817	Previously served (A-VA) 1793–95, (DR-VA) 1795-1805 and (DR-KY) 1811-13 while as a member of the House. Last term while serving as a member of the House until 17th Congress.
Seven consecutive terms
4	Jonathan O. Moseley	F	CT-al	March 4, 1805	
5	Timothy Pitkin	F	CT-al	September 16, 1805	Last term while serving as a member of the House.
6	William A. Burwell	DR	VA-14	December 1, 1806	Elected to this Congress: April 1817
Seven non-consecutive terms
7	John Rhea	DR	TN-1	March 4, 1817	Previously served (DR) 1803-15 while as a member of the House. Elected to this Congress: August 7–8, 1817. Chairman: Pensions and Revolutionary Claims.
8	Henry Southard	DR	NJ-al	March 4, 1815	Previously served (DR) 1801-11 while in the House.
9	Samuel Smith	DR	MD-5	January 31, 1816	Previously served (A) 1793-95 and (DR) 1795-1803 while in the House. Chairman: Ways and Means (1818–19).
Six consecutive terms
10	Joseph Desha	DR	KY-4	March 4, 1807	Chairman: Public Expenditures. Last term while serving in the House.
11	Richard M. Johnson	DR	KY-3	March 4, 1807	Chairman: Expenditures in the War Department. Last term while serving in the House until 21st Congress.
Six non-consecutive terms
12	Burwell Bassett	DR	VA-13	March 4, 1815	Previously served (DR) 1805–13 while in the House. Elected to this Congress: April 1817. Last term while serving in the House until 17th Congress.
13	Joseph Hiester	DR	PA-7	March 4, 1815	Previously served (DR) December 1, 1798 – 1805 while in the House.
Four consecutive terms
14	John C. Calhoun	DR	SC-5	March 4, 1811	Resigned, as Representative-elect, to become Secretary of War: November 3, 1817
15	William Lowndes	DR	SC-9	March 4, 1811	Chairman: Ways and Means (1817–18). Chairman: Expenditures in the Treasury Department.
16	William McCoy	DR	VA-4	March 4, 1811	Elected to this Congress: April 1817
17	Hugh Nelson	DR	VA-22	March 4, 1811	Elected to this Congress: April 1817. Chairman: Judiciary.
18	James Pleasants	DR	VA-17	March 4, 1811	Elected to this Congress: April 1817. Chairman: Expenditures in the Navy Department.
19	Philip Stuart	F	MD-1	March 4, 1811	Last term while serving in the House.
20	Thomas B. Robertson	DR	LA-al	April 30, 1812	Chairman: Public Lands (1817–18). Resigned while still serving in the House: April 20, 1818.
21	Henry Clay	DR	KY-2	October 30, 1815	Previously served (DR) 1811-January 19, 1814, and 1815 while at the House. Speaker of the House.
Four non-consecutive terms
22	William Anderson	DR	PA-1	March 4, 1817	Previously served (DR) 1809–15 while in the House. Last term while serving in the House.
23	Lemuel Sawyer	DR	NC-1	March 4, 1817	Previously served (DR) 1807-13 while in the House. Elected to this Congress: August 14, 1817.
24	Adam Seybert	DR	PA-1	March 4, 1817	Previously served (DR) October 10, 1809-15 while in the House. Last term while serving in the House.
25	Elias Earle	DR	SC-6	March 4, 1817	Previously served (DR) September 27, 1806–07 and 1811–15 while in the House.
26	Samuel Ringgold	DR	MD-4	March 4, 1817	Previously served (DR) October 15, 1810-15 while in the House.
Three consecutive terms
27	Oliver C. Comstock	DR	NY-20	March 4, 1813	Last term while serving in the House.
28	John Forsyth	DR	GA-al	March 4, 1813	Chairman: Expenditures in the State Department. Resigned, to become US Senator: November 23, 1818.
29	Samuel D. Ingham	DR	PA-6	March 4, 1813	Chairman: Post Office and Post Roads (1817–18). Chairman: Expenditures in the Post Office Department. Resigned while still serving in the House: July 6, 1818. Last term while serving in the House until 17th Congress
30	James Johnson	DR	VA-20	March 4, 1813	Elected to this Congress: April 1817
31	Nathaniel Ruggles	F	MA-13	March 4, 1813	Last term while serving in the House.
32	John W. Taylor	DR	NY-11	March 4, 1813	Chairman: Elections. Chairman: Revisal and Unfinished Business (1818–19).
33	William Irving	DR	NY-2	January 22, 1814	Last term while serving in the House.
34	Philip P. Barbour	DR	VA-11	September 19, 1814	Elected to this Congress: April 1817
Three non-consecutive terms
35	Jeremiah Nelson	F	MA-3	March 4, 1815	Elected to this Congress: May 1, 1817. Previously served (F) 1805-07 while serving in the House.
36	John Ross	DR	PA-6	March 4, 1815	Previously served (DR) 1809–11 while in the House. Resigned while serving in the House: February 24, 1818.
37	Peter Little	DR	MD-5	September 2, 1816	Previously served (DR) 1811-13 while in the House. Chairman: Accounts.
Two consecutive terms
38	Ephraim Bateman	DR	NJ-al	March 4, 1815	
39	Benjamin Bennet	DR	NJ-al	March 4, 1815	Last term while serving as a member of the House.
40	John L. Boss, Jr.	F	RI-al	March 4, 1815	Last term while serving as a member of the House.
41	Joseph H. Bryan	DR	NC-2	March 4, 1815	Elected to this Congress: August 14, 1817. Last term while serving in the House.
42	Daniel M. Forney	DR	NC-11	March 4, 1815	Elected to this Congress: August 14, 1817. Resigned while still serving in the House: October 6, 1818.
43	John C. Herbert	F	MD-2	March 4, 1815	Chairman: District of Columbia. Last term while serving in the House.
44	Joseph Hopkinson	F	PA-1	March 4, 1815	Last term while serving in the House.
45	William Maclay	DR	PA-5	March 4, 1815	Last term while serving in the House.
46	James B. Mason	F	RI-al	March 4, 1815	Last term while serving in the House.
47	Henry Middleton	DR	SC-1	March 4, 1815	Last term while serving in the House.
48	Elijah H. Mills	F	MA-5	March 4, 1815	Last term while serving in the House.
49	Albion K. Parris	DR	MA-20	March 4, 1815	Resigned while still serving as a member of the House: February 3, 1818
50	Thomas Rice	F	MA-18	March 4, 1815	Elected to this Congress: December 1, 1817. Last term while serving in the House.
51	John Savage	DR	NY-12	March 4, 1815	Chairman: Revisal and Unfinished Business (1817–18). Last term while serving in the House.
52	Ballard Smith	DR	VA-7	March 4, 1815	Elected to this Congress: April 1817
53	Solomon Strong	F	MA-12	March 4, 1815	Last term while serving in the House.
54	George Townsend	DR	NY-1	March 4, 1815	Last term while serving in the House.
55	Henry S. Tucker	DR	VA-3	March 4, 1815	Elected to this Congress: April 1817. Chairman: Expenditures on Public Buildings. Last term while serving in the House.
56	Peter H. Wendover	DR	NY-2	March 4, 1815	
57	John Whiteside	DR	PA-3	March 4, 1815	Last term while serving as a member of the House.
58	Lewis Williams	DR	NC-13	March 4, 1815	Elected to this Congress: August 14, 1817. Chairman: Claims.
59	William Wilson	DR	PA-10	March 4, 1815	Last term while serving in the House.
60	James W. Wilkin	DR	NY-6	June 7, 1815	Last term while serving in the House.
61	John Sergeant	F	PA-1	October 10, 1815	
62	James M. Wallace	DR	PA-3	October 10, 1815	
63	William G. Blount	DR	TN-2	December 8, 1815	Elected to this Congress: August 7–8, 1817. Last term while serving in the House.
64	Weldon N. Edwards	DR	NC-6	February 7, 1816	Elected to this Congress: August 7–8, 1817
65	George Peter	F	MD-3	October 7, 1816	Last term while serving in the House until 19th Congress
66	William H. Harrison	DR	OH-1	October 8, 1816	Previously served as Northwest Territory Delegate 1799-May 14, 1800. Last term while serving in the House.
67	William P. Maclay	DR	PA-9	October 8, 1816	
68	Benjamin Adams	F	MA-11	December 2, 1816	
69	Zadock Cook	DR	GA-al	December 2, 1816	Last term while serving as a member of the House.
70	Thomas M. Nelson	DR	VA-18	December 4, 1816	Elected to this Congress: April 1817. Last term while serving in the House.
71	William Hendricks	DR	IN-al	December 11, 1816	Elected to this Congress: August 4, 1817
72	John Tyler	DR	VA-23	December 17, 1816	Elected to this Congress: April 1817
73	Stephen D. Miller	DR	SC-8	January 2, 1817	Last term while serving in the House.
Two non-consecutive terms
74	Clifton Clagett	DR	NH-al	March 4, 1817	Previously served (F) 1803-05 while in the House.
75	Charles Rich	DR	VT-al	March 4, 1817	Previously served (DR) 1813-15 while in the House.
76	Ezekiel Whitman	F	MA-15	March 4, 1817	Previously served (F) 1809-11 while as a member of the House.
77	John Wilson	F	MA-17	March 4, 1817	Previously served (F) 1813-15 while as a member of the House. Last term while serving in the House.
78	Josiah Hasbrouck	DR	NY-7	March 4, 1817	Previously served (DR) April 28, 1803-05 while as a member of the House. Chairman: Expenditures in the State Department (1818–19). Last term while serving in the House.
79	Isaac Williams, Jr.	DR	NY-15	March 4, 1817	Previously served (DR) December 20, 1813–15 while in the House. Last term while serving in the House until 18th Congress.
One term				March 4, 1817	
80	Joel Abbot	DR	GA-al	March 4, 1817	
81	Heman Allen	DR	VT-al	March 4, 1817	Resigned: April 20, 1818
82	Samuel C. Allen	F	MA-6	March 4, 1817	
83	Richard C. Anderson, Jr.	DR	KY-8	March 4, 1817	
84	Archibald Austin	DR	VA-16	March 4, 1817	Elected to this Congress: April 1817. Only term while serving as a member of the House.
85	Sylvanus Backus	F	CT-al	March 4, 1817	Died as Representative-elect: February 4, 1817
86	Henry Baldwin	DR	PA-14	March 4, 1817	
87	William L. Ball	DR	VA-9	March 4, 1817	Elected to this Congress: April 1817
88	Levi Barber	DR	OH-3	March 4, 1817	Only term while serving as a member of the House until 17th Congress
89	Thomas Bayly	F	MD-8	March 4, 1817	
90	Philemon Beecher	F	OH-5	March 4, 1817	
91	Joseph Bellinger	DR	SC-3	March 4, 1817	Only term while serving in the House.
92	Joseph Bloomfield	DR	NJ-al	March 4, 1817	
93	Andrew Boden	DR	PA-5	March 4, 1817	
94	Josiah Butler	DR	NH-al	March 4, 1817	
95	John W. Campbell	DR	OH-2	March 4, 1817	
96	Thomas Claiborne	DR	TN-5	March 4, 1817	Elected to this Congress: August 7–8, 1817. Only term while serving in the House.
97	Thomas W. Cobb	DR	GA-al	March 4, 1817	
98	Edward Colston	F	VA-2	March 4, 1817	Elected to this Congress: April 1817. Only term while serving in the House.
99	Samuel C. Crafts	DR	VT-al	March 4, 1817	
100	Joel Crawford	DR	GA-al	March 4, 1817	
101	Daniel Cruger	DR	NY-20	March 4, 1817	Only term while serving in the House.
102	Thomas Culbreth	DR	MD-7	March 4, 1817	
103	John P. Cushman	F	NY-10	March 4, 1817	Only term while serving in the House.
104	Isaac Darlington	F	PA-2	March 4, 1817	Only term while serving in the House.
105	Charles Dennison	F	CT-al	March 4, 1817	Representative-elect who declined to serve
106	John R. Drake	DR	NY-15	March 4, 1817	Only term while serving in the House.
107	Benjamin Ellicott	DR	NY-21	March 4, 1817	Only term while serving in the House.
108	James Ervin	DR	SC-2	March 4, 1817	
109	John Floyd	DR	VA-5	March 4, 1817	Elected to this Congress: April 1817
110	Walter Folger, Jr.	DR	MA-9	March 4, 1817	Elected to this Congress: May 1, 1817
111	Timothy Fuller	DR	MA-4	March 4, 1817	
112	Joshua Gage	DR	MA-19	March 4, 1817	Elected to this Congress: September 29, 1817. Only term while serving in the House.
113	Robert S. Garnett	DR	VA-12	March 4, 1817	Elected to this Congress: April 1817
114	Salma Hale	DR	NH-al	March 4, 1817	Only term while serving in the House.
115	Thomas H. Hall	DR	NC-3	March 4, 1817	Elected to this Congress: August 14, 1817
116	Willard Hall	DR	DE-al	March 4, 1817	
117	John Herkimer	DR	NY-14	March 4, 1817	Only term while serving in the House until 18th Congress
118	Samuel Herrick	DR	OH-4	March 4, 1817	Chairman: Private Land Claims (1817–18)
119	Peter Hitchcock	DR	OH-6	March 4, 1817	Only term while serving as a member of the House.
120	Samuel Hogg	DR	TN-4	March 4, 1817	Elected to this Congress: August 7–8, 1817. Only term while serving in the House.
121	John Holmes	DR	MA-14	March 4, 1817	
122	Uriel Holmes	F	CT-al	March 4, 1817	Resigned while still serving in the House: August 1818
123	Thomas H. Hubbard	DR	NY-17	March 4, 1817	Chairman: Expenditures in the Post Office Department (1818–19). Only term while serving in the House until 17th Congress.
124	William Hunter	DR	VT-al	March 4, 1817	Only term while serving in the House.
125	Francis Jones	DR	TN-3	March 4, 1817	Elected to this Congress: August 7–8, 1817
126	Charles Kinsey	DR	NJ-al	March 4, 1817	Only term while serving in the House until 16th Congress.
127	Dorrance Kirtland	DR	NY-8	March 4, 1817	Only term while serving in the House.
128	Thomas Lawyer	DR	NY-13	March 4, 1817	Only term while serving in the House.
129	Henry B. Lee	DR	NY-3	March 4, 1817	Died as Representative-elect: February 18, 1817
130	William J. Lewis	DR	VA-15	March 4, 1817	Elected to this Congress: April 1817. Only term while serving in the House.
131	John Linn	DR	NJ-al	March 4, 1817	
132	Arthur Livermore	DR	NH-al	March 4, 1817	Chairman: Post Office and Post Roads (1818–19)
133	James Lloyd	F	MA-1	March 4, 1817	Resigned as Representative-elect: October 25, 1817
134	David Marchand	DR	PA-11	March 4, 1817	
135	George W. L. Marr	DR	TN-6	March 4, 1817	Elected to this Congress: August 7–8, 1817. Only term while serving in the House.
136	Louis McLane	F	DE-al	March 4, 1817	
137	Alexander McMillan	F	NC-7	March 4, 1817	Elected to this Congress: August 14, 1817. Died as Representative-elect: November 13, 1817.
138	Charles F. Mercer	F	VA-8	March 4, 1817	Elected to this Congress: April 1817
139	Orsamus C. Merrill	DR	VT-al	March 4, 1817	
140	Robert Moore	DR	PA-15	March 4, 1817	
141	Marcus Morton	DR	MA-10	March 4, 1817	
142	George Mumford	DR	NC-10	March 4, 1817	Elected to this Congress: August 14, 1817. Died: December 31, 1818.
143	Wilson Nesbitt	DR	SC-7	March 4, 1817	Only term while serving in the House.
144	David A. Ogden	F	NY-18	March 4, 1817	Only term while serving in the House.
145	Alexander Ogle	DR	PA-8	March 4, 1817	Only term while serving in the House.
146	Benjamin Orr	F	MA-16	March 4, 1817	Only term while serving in the House.
147	James Owen	DR	NC-5	March 4, 1817	Elected to this Congress: August 14, 1817. Only term while serving in the House.
148	John Palmer	DR	NY-12	March 4, 1817	Only term while serving in the House until 25th Congress.
149	John F. Parrott	DR	NH-al	March 4, 1817	Only term while serving in the House.
150	Thomas Patterson	DR	PA-12	March 4, 1817	
151	Levi Pawling	F	PA-2	March 4, 1817	Only term while serving as a member of the House.
152	James Pindall	F	VA-1	March 4, 1817	Elected to this Congress: April 1817
153	James Porter	DR	NY-19	March 4, 1817	Only term while serving in the House.
154	Tunstal Quarles	DR	KY-9	March 4, 1817	
155	Philip Reed	DR	MD-6	March 4, 1817	Only term while serving in the House until 17th Congress.
156	Mark Richards	DR	VT-al	March 4, 1817	
157	George Robertson	DR	KY-7	March 4, 1817	Chairman: Private Land Claims (1818–19)
158	Zabdiel Sampson	DR	MA-8	March 4, 1817	
159	Philip J. Schuyler	F	NY-5	March 4, 1817	Only term while serving as a member of the House.
160	David Scott	DR	PA-10	March 4, 1817	Resigned as Representative-elect before Congress convened
161	Tredwell Scudder	DR	NY-1	March 4, 1817	Only term while serving in the House.
162	Thomas Settle	DR	NC-9	March 4, 1817	Elected to this Congress: August 14, 1817
163	Henry Shaw	DR	MA-7	March 4, 1817	
164	Samuel B. Sherwood	F	CT-al	March 4, 1817	Only term while serving in the House.
165	Nathaniel Silsbee	DR	MA-2	March 4, 1817	
166	Jesse Slocumb	F	NC-4	March 4, 1817	Elected to this Congress: August 14, 1817
167	James S. Smith	DR	NC-8	March 4, 1817	Elected to this Congress: August 14, 1817
168	Alexander Smyth	DR	VA-6	March 4, 1817	Elected to this Congress: April 1817
169	Jacob Spangler	DR	PA-4	March 4, 1817	Resigned while still serving in the House: April 20, 1818
170	Thomas Speed	DR	KY-10	March 4, 1817	Only term while serving in the House.
171	John C. Spencer	DR	NY-21	March 4, 1817	Only term while serving in the House.
172	Henry R. Storrs	F	NY-16	March 4, 1817	
173	George Strother	DR	VA-10	March 4, 1817	Elected to this Congress: April 1817
174	Christian Tarr	DR	PA-13	March 4, 1817	
175	William Terrell	DR	GA-al	March 4, 1817	
176	Caleb Tompkins	DR	NY-3	March 4, 1817	
177	David Trimble	DR	KY-1	March 4, 1817	
178	Starling Tucker	DR	SC-4	March 4, 1817	
179	Nathaniel Upham	DR	NH-al	March 4, 1817	
180	David Walker	DR	KY-6	March 4, 1817	
181	Felix Walker	DR	NC-12	March 4, 1817	Elected to this Congress: August 14, 1817
182	Rensselaer Westerlo	F	NY-9	March 4, 1817	Only term while serving in the House.
183	Thomas S. Williams	F	CT-al	March 4, 1817	Only term while serving in the House.
Members joining the House, after the start of the Congress
...	Ebenezer Huntington	F	CT-al	April 3, 1817	Previously served (F) October 11, 1810–11 and 1815-17 while in the House. Special election. Last term while serving in the House.
...	Nathaniel Terry	F	CT-al	April 3, 1817	Special election. Only term while serving in the House.
...	James Tallmadge, Jr.	DR	NY-4	June 6, 1817	Special election: April 29–30, May 1, 1817. Only term while serving in the House.
...	John Murray	DR	PA-10	October 14, 1817	Special election
...	Jonathan Mason	F	MA-1	November 17, 1817	Special election
184	George Poindexter	DR	MS-al	December 10, 1817	Formerly Delegate 1807–13. First Representative from new state. Chairman: Public Lands (1818–19). Only term while serving in the House.
...	James Stewart	F	NC-7	January 5, 1818	Special election. Only term while serving in the House.
...	Eldred Simkins	DR	SC-5	January 24, 1818	Special election: December 29–30, 1817
...	Thomas J. Rogers	DR	PA-6	March 3, 1818	Special election
...	John Pegram	DR	VA-19	April 21, 1818	Special election: April 1818. Only term while serving in the House.
...	Samuel Moore	DR	PA-6	October 13, 1818	Special election
...	Enoch Lincoln	DR	MA-20	November 4, 1818	Special election: March 16, 1818
...	Thomas Butler	DR	LA-al	November 16, 1818	Special election: July 6–8, 1818
...	Sylvester Gilbert	F	CT-al	November 16, 1818	Special election: September 21, 1818. Only term while serving in the House.
...	Jacob Hostetter	DR	PA-4	November 16, 1818	Special election: March 17, 1818
...	William Davidson	F	NC-11	December 2, 1818	Special election: November 7, 1818
185	John McLean	DR	IL-al	December 3, 1818	First Representative from new state. Only term while serving in the House.
...	Charles Fisher	DR	NC-10	February 11, 1819	Special election: January 29, 1819
...	Robert R. Reid	DR	GA-al	February 18, 1819	Special election: January 4, 1819
Non voting members
a	Nathaniel Pope	-	IL-al	September 5, 1816	Delegate from Illinois Territory until resigned: November 30, 1818
b	John Scott	-	MO-al	August 4, 1817	Delegate from Missouri Territory. Previously served (Ind) August 6, 1816 – January 13, 1817, while in the House.
c	John Crowell	-	AL-al	January 29, 1818	Delegate from Alabama Territory. Only term until elected Representative in 16th Congress.

== See also ==
- 15th United States Congress
- List of United States congressional districts
- List of United States senators in the 15th Congress
