= List of United States representatives in the 16th Congress =

This is a complete list of United States representatives during the 16th United States Congress listed by seniority. For the most part, representatives are ranked by the beginning of their terms in office.

As an historical article, the districts and party affiliations listed reflect those during the 16th Congress (March 4, 1819 – March 3, 1821). Seats and party affiliations on similar lists for other congresses will be different for certain members.

This article describes the criteria for seniority in the House of Representatives and sets out the list of members by seniority. It is prepared on the basis of the interpretation of seniority applied to the House of Representatives in the current congress. In the absence of information to the contrary, it is presumed that the twenty-first-century practice is identical to the seniority customs used during the 16th Congress.

== House seniority ==
Seniority in the House, for representatives with unbroken service, depends on the date on which the members first term began. That date is either the start of the Congress (4 March in odd numbered years, for the era up to and including the 73rd Congress starting in 1933) or the date of a special election during the Congress. Since many members start serving on the same day as others, ranking between them is based on alphabetical order by the last name of the representative.

Representatives in early congresses were often elected after the legal start of the Congress. Such representatives are attributed with unbroken seniority, from the legal start of the congressional term, if they were the first person elected to a seat in a Congress. The date of the election is indicated in a note.

The seniority date is normally taken from the members entry in the Biographical Directory of the United States Congress, except where the date given is the legal start of the Congress and the actual election (for someone who was not the first person elected to the seat in that Congress) was later. The date of election is taken from United States Congressional Elections 1788-1997. In a few instances the latter work provides dates, for the start and end of terms, which correct those in the Biographical Directory.

The Biographical Directory normally uses the date of a special election, as the seniority date. However, mostly in early congresses, the date of the member taking his seat can be the one given. The date of the special election is mentioned in a note to the list below, when that date is not used as the seniority date by the Biographical Directory.

Representatives who returned to the House, after having previously served, are credited with service equal to one less than the total number of terms they served. When a representative has served a prior term of less than two terms (i.e. prior term minus one equals less than one), he is ranked above all others whose service begins on the same day.

== Leadership ==
In this Congress the only formal leader was the speaker of the House. A speakership ballot was held on December 6, 1819, and Henry Clay (DR-KY) was re-elected for a fifth consecutive Congress (although he had resigned, during the 13th Congress on January 19, 1814, so his service had not been continuous). Henry Clay received 147 votes and there were 8 scattering votes.

Speaker Clay resigned before the convening of the second session on November 13, 1820. The second speakership election, during this Congress, took place between November 13–15, 1820. John W. Taylor (DR-NY) was elected, on the twenty-second ballot. In the final ballot, Taylor received 76 votes, William Lowndes (DR-SC) had 44, Samuel Smith (DR-MD) 27 and 1 was scattering.

The title Dean of the House (sometimes known, in the nineteenth century, as Father of the House) was held by the member with the longest continuous service. It was not a formal leadership position.

== Standing committees ==
The House created its first standing committee, on April 13, 1789. There were nineteen standing committees, listed in the rules initially used by the 16th Congress. Two additional committees were added during the Congress. The Committee on Manufactures was created on December 8, 1819, and the Committee on Agriculture was provided for by a resolution passed on May 3, 1820.

Committees, in this period, were normally appointed for a session at a time by the speaker. However the resolution of March 30, 1816, which created the committees on departmental expenditures and Expenditures on Public Buildings, provided for those standing committees to be appointed for the whole Congress.

This list refers to the standing committees of the House in the 16th Congress, the year of establishment as a standing committee, the number of members assigned to the committee and the dates of appointment in each session (or if appropriate for the Congress), the end of the session (if appropriate) and its chairman. Chairmen, who were re-appointed after serving in the previous Congress, are indicated by an *.

The first session was December 6, 1819 – May 15, 1820 (162 days) and the second session was November 13, 1820 – March 3, 1821 (111 days).

No.	Committee	From	Members	Appointed	Chairman
1	Accounts	1805	3	December 8, 1819 – May 15, 1820	James S. Smith (DR-NC)
1	Accounts	1805	3	November 15, 1820 – March 3, 1821	James S. Smith (DR-NC)
2	Agriculture	1820	7	November 15, 1820-March 3, 1821	Thomas Forrest (F-PA)
3	Claims	1794	7	December 8, 1819 – May 15, 1820	Lewis Williams (DR-NC)
3	Claims	1794	7	November 15, 1820 – March 3, 1821	Lewis Williams (DR-NC)
4	Commerce	1795	7	December 8, 1819 – May 15, 1820	*Thomas Newton, Jr. (DR-VA)
4	Commerce	1795	7	November 15, 1820 – March 3, 1821	*Thomas Newton, Jr. (DR-VA)
5	District of Columbia	1808	7	December 8, 1819 – May 15, 1820	Joseph Kent (DR-MD)
5	District of Columbia	1808	7	November 15, 1820 – March 3, 1821	Joseph Kent (DR-MD)
6	Elections	1789	7	December 8, 1819 – May 15, 1820	*John W. Taylor (DR-NY)
6	Elections	1789	7	November 15, 1820 – March 3, 1821	David Trimble (DR-KY)
7	Expenditures in the Navy Department	1816	3	December 8, 1819-March 3, 1821	Stevenson Archer (DR-MD)
8	Expenditures in the Post Office Department	1816	3	December 8, 1819-March 3, 1821	Arthur Livermore (DR-NH)
9	Expenditures in the State Department	1816	3	December 8, 1819-March 3, 1821	John Holmes (DR-MA) (a)
10	Expenditures in the Treasury Department	1816	3	December 8, 1819-March 3, 1821	David Trimble (DR-KY)
11	Expenditures in the War Department	1816	3	December 8, 1819-March 3, 1821	Henry Brush (DR-OH)
12	Expenditures on Public Buildings	1816	3	December 8, 1819-March 3, 1821	Henry Meigs (DR-NY)
13	Judiciary	1813	7	December 8, 1819 – May 15, 1820	John Sergeant (F-PA)
13	Judiciary	1813	7	November 15, 1820 – March 3, 1821	John Sergeant (F-PA)
14	Manufactures	1819	7	December 8, 1819 – May 15, 1820	Henry Baldwin (DR-PA)
14	Manufactures	1819	7	November 15, 1820 – March 3, 1821	Henry Baldwin (DR-PA)
15	Pensions and Revolutionary Claims	1813	7	December 8, 1819 – May 15, 1820	*John Rhea (DR-TN)
15	Pensions and Revolutionary Claims	1813	7	November 15, 1820 – March 3, 1821	*John Rhea (DR-TN)
16	Post Office and Post Roads	1808	7	December 8, 1819 – May 15, 1820	*Arthur Livermore (DR-NH)
16	Post Office and Post Roads	1808	7	November 15, 1820 – March 3, 1821	*Arthur Livermore (DR-NH)
17	Private Land Claims	1816	7	December 8, 1819 – May 15, 1820	John W. Campbell (DR-OH)
17	Private Land Claims	1816	7	November 15, 1820 – March 3, 1821	John W. Campbell (DR-OH)
18	Public Expenditures	1814	7	December 8, 1819 – May 15, 1820	Eldred Simkins (DR-SC)
18	Public Expenditures	1814	7	November 15, 1820 – March 3, 1821	Eldred Simkins (DR-SC)
19	Public Lands	1805	7	December 8, 1819 – May 15, 1820	Richard C. Anderson, Jr. (DR-KY)
19	Public Lands	1805	7	November 15, 1820 – March 3, 1821	Richard C. Anderson, Jr. (DR-KY)
20	Revisal and Unfinished Business	1795	3	December 8, 1819 – May 15, 1820	Marcus Morton (DR-MA)
20	Revisal and Unfinished Business	1795	3	November 15, 1820 – March 3, 1821	Marcus Morton (DR-MA)
21	Ways and Means	1802	7	December 8, 1819 – May 15, 1820	*Samuel Smith (DR-MD)
21	Ways and Means	1802	7	November 15, 1820 – March 3, 1821	*Samuel Smith (DR-MD)

Note:-

- (a) Resigned from the House: March 15, 1820. Harmanus Peek (DR-NY) became Chairman for the rest of the Congress.

== List of representatives by seniority ==
A numerical rank is assigned to each of the 185 members initially elected to the 16th Congress. Other members, who were not the first person elected to a seat but who joined the House during the Congress, are not assigned a number (except for the representative from the newly admitted state of Alabama, who is assigned the number 186). The first representative from the newly admitted state of Maine, was elected to a seat transferred from Massachusetts and is not assigned a number.

3 representatives-elect were not sworn in. 1 was unseated after an election contest (NY-1: Sage) and 2 resigned (GA-al:Forsyth;NJ-al:Condict). The list below includes the representatives-elect (with name in italics), with the seniority they would have held if sworn in.

Party designations used in this article are DR for Democratic-Republican members and F for Federalist representatives. Designations used for service in the first three congresses are (A) for Anti-Administration members and (P) for Pro-Administration representatives.

U.S. House seniority
Rank	Representative	Party	District	Seniority date	Previous service	Notes
1	Thomas Newton, Jr.	DR	VA-21	March 4, 1801		Elected to this Congress: April 1819. Dean of the House. Chairman: Commerce.
2	John Randolph	DR	VA-16	March 4, 1819	1799-1813 1815-1817	Elected to this Congress: April 1819.
3	Jonathan O. Moseley	F	CT-al	March 4, 1805		Last term while serving in the House.
4	William A. Burwell	DR	VA-14	December 1, 1806		Elected to this Congress: April 1819. Died while still serving in the House: February 16, 1821
5	John Rhea	DR	TN-1	March 4, 1817	1813-1815	Elected to this Congress: August 5–6, 1819. Chairman: Pensions and Revolutionary Claims.
6	Henry Southard	DR	NJ-al	March 4, 1815	1801-1811	Last term while serving in the House.
7	Samuel Smith	DR	MD-5	January 31, 1816	1793-1803	Chairman: Ways and Means.
8	Joseph Hiester	DR	PA-7	March 4, 1815	1798-1805	Previously served (DR) December 1, 1798 – 1805. Resigned to become Governor: December 1820.
9	William Lowndes	DR	SC-9	March 4, 1811		
10	William McCoy	DR	VA-4	March 4, 1811		Elected to this Congress: April 1819
11	Hugh Nelson	DR	VA-22	March 4, 1811		Elected to this Congress: April 1819
12	James Pleasants	DR	VA-17	March 4, 1811		Elected to this Congress: April 1819. Resigned to become US Senator: December 14, 1819.
13	Henry Clay	DR	KY-2	October 30, 1815		Previously served (DR) 1811-January 19, 1814, and 1815. Speaker of the House (1819–20). Last term until 18th Congress.
14	Lemuel Sawyer	DR	NC-1	March 4, 1817	1807-1813	Elected to this Congress: August 13, 1819.
15	Elias Earle	DR	SC-6	March 4, 1817	1806-1807, 1811-1815	Last term while serving in the House.
16	Samuel Ringgold	DR	MD-4	March 4, 1817	1810-1815	Last term while serving in the House.
17	John Forsyth	DR	GA-al	March 4, 1813		Resigned as Representative-elect, to become US Senator: November 23, 1818
18	James Johnson	DR	VA-20	March 4, 1813		Elected to this Congress: April 1819. Resigned while serving in the House: February 1, 1820.
19	John W. Taylor	DR	NY-11	March 4, 1813		Chairman: Elections (1819–20). Speaker of the House (1820-21).
20	Philip P. Barbour	DR	VA-11	September 19, 1814		Elected to this Congress: April 1819
21	Jeremiah Nelson	F	MA-3	March 4, 1815	1805-1807	
22	Ebenezer Sage	DR	NY-1	March 4, 1819	1809-1815	Unseated, as a Representative-elect, after an election contest: January 14, 1820.
23	John Culpepper	F	NC-7	March 4, 1819	1807-Jan 1808, Feb 1808-1809, 1813-1817|| Elected to this Congress: August 13, 1819. Last term while serving in the House until 18th Congress.	
24	Stevenson Archer	DR	MD-6	March 4, 1819	1811-1817	Chairman: Expenditures in the Navy Department. Last term while serving in the House.
25	Peter Little	DR	MD-5	September 2, 1816	1811-1813	Previously served (DR) 1811-13 while in the House.
26	Ephraim Bateman	DR	NJ-al	March 4, 1815		
27	Ballard Smith	DR	VA-7	March 4, 1815		Elected to this Congress: April 1819. Last term while serving in the House.
28	Peter H. Wendover	DR	NY-2	March 4, 1815		Last term while serving in the House.
29	Lewis Williams	DR	NC-13	March 4, 1815		Elected to this Congress: August 13, 1819. Chairman: Claims.
30	John Sergeant	F	PA-1	October 10, 1815		Chairman: Judiciary
31	James M. Wallace	DR	PA-3	October 10, 1815		Last term while serving in the House.
32	Weldon N. Edwards	DR	NC-6	February 7, 1816		Elected to this Congress: August 13, 1819
33	William P. Maclay	DR	PA-9	October 8, 1816		Last term while serving in the House.
34	Benjamin Adams	F	MA-11	December 2, 1816		Last term while serving in the House.
35	William Hendricks	DR	IN-al	December 11, 1816		
36	John Tyler	DR	VA-23	December 17, 1816		Elected to this Congress: April 1819. Last term while serving in the House.
37	Clifton Clagett	DR	NH-al	March 4, 1817	1803-1805	Elected to this Congress: March 9, 1819. Last term while serving in the House.
38	John Condit	DR	NJ-al	March 4, 1819	1799-1803	Resigned, as Representative-elect: November 4, 1819.
39	Joseph Kent	DR	MD-2	March 4, 1819	1811-1815	Chairman: District of Columbia.
40	Charles Rich	DR	VT-al	March 4, 1817	1813-1815	
41	William Strong	DR	VT-al	March 4, 1819	1811-1815	Last term while serving in the House.
42	Ezekiel Whitman	F	MA-15	March 4, 1817	1809-1811	
43	Newton Cannon	DR	TN-5	March 4, 1819	1814-1817	Elected to this Congress: August 5–6, 1819.
44	Joel Abbot	DR	GA-al	March 4, 1817		
45	Samuel C. Allen	F	MA-6	March 4, 1817		
46	Richard C. Anderson, Jr.	DR	KY-8	March 4, 1817		Chairman: Public Lands. Last term while serving in the House.
47	Henry Baldwin	DR	PA-14	March 4, 1817		Chairman: Manufactures
48	William L. Ball	DR	VA-9	March 4, 1817		Elected to this Congress: April 1819
49	Thomas Bayly	F	MD-8	March 4, 1817		
50	Philemon Beecher	F	OH-5	March 4, 1817		Last term while serving in the House until 18th Congress.
51	Joseph Bloomfield	DR	NJ-al	March 4, 1817		Last term while serving in the House.
52	Andrew Boden	DR	PA-5	March 4, 1817		Last term while serving in the House.
53	Josiah Butler	DR	NH-al	March 4, 1817		Elected to this Congress: March 9, 1819
54	John W. Campbell	DR	OH-2	March 4, 1817		Chairman: Private Land Claims
55	Thomas W. Cobb	DR	GA-al	March 4, 1817		Last term while serving in the House until 18th Congress.
56	Samuel C. Crafts	DR	VT-al	March 4, 1817		
57	Joel Crawford	DR	GA-al	March 4, 1817		Last term while serving in the House.
58	Thomas Culbreth	DR	MD-7	March 4, 1817		Last term while serving in the House.
59	James Ervin	DR	SC-2	March 4, 1817		Last term while serving in the House.
60	John Floyd	DR	VA-5	March 4, 1817		Elected to this Congress: April 1819
61	Walter Folger, Jr.	DR	MA-9	March 4, 1817		Last term while serving in the House.
62	Timothy Fuller	DR	MA-4	March 4, 1817		
63	Robert S. Garnett	DR	VA-12	March 4, 1817		Elected to this Congress: April 1819
64	Thomas H. Hall	DR	NC-3	March 4, 1817		Elected to this Congress: August 13, 1819
65	Willard Hall	DR	DE-al	March 4, 1817		Resigned while still serving in the House: January 22, 1821
66	Samuel Herrick	DR	OH-4	March 4, 1817		Last term while serving in the House.
67	John Holmes	DR	MA-14	March 4, 1817		Chairman: Expenditures in the State Department (1819–20). Resigned while still serving in the House: March 15, 1820.
68	Francis Jones	DR	TN-3	March 4, 1817		Elected to this Congress: August 5–6, 1819
69	John Linn	DR	NJ-al	March 4, 1817		Died while still serving in the House: January 5, 1821
70	Arthur Livermore	DR	NH-al	March 4, 1817		Elected to this Congress: March 9, 1819. Chairman: Expenditures in the Post Office Department. Chairman: Post Office and Post Roads. Last term while serving in the House until 18th Congress.
71	David Marchand	DR	PA-11	March 4, 1817		Last term while serving in the House.
72	Louis McLane	F	DE-al	March 4, 1817		
73	Charles F. Mercer	F	VA-8	March 4, 1817		Elected to this Congress: April 1819
74	Orsamus C. Merrill	DR	VT-al	March 4, 1817		Unseated, after election contest: January 12, 1820
75	Robert Moore	DR	PA-15	March 4, 1817		Last term while serving in the House.
76	Marcus Morton	DR	MA-10	March 4, 1817		Chairman: Revisal and Unfinished Business. Last term while serving in the House.
77	Thomas Patterson	DR	PA-12	March 4, 1817		
78	James Pindall	F	VA-1	March 4, 1817		Elected to this Congress: April 1819. Resigned while still serving in the House: July 26, 1820.
79	Tunstall Quarles	DR	KY-9	March 4, 1817		Resigned while still serving in the House: June 15, 1820
80	Mark Richards	DR	VT-al	March 4, 1817		Last term while serving in the House.
81	George Robertson	DR	KY-7	March 4, 1817		
82	Zabdiel Sampson	DR	MA-8	March 4, 1817		Resigned while still serving in the House: July 26, 1820
83	Thomas Settle	DR	NC-9	March 4, 1817		Elected to this Congress: August 13, 1819. Last term while serving in the House.
84	Henry Shaw	DR	MA-7	March 4, 1817		Elected to this Congress: April 5, 1819. Last term while serving in the House.
85	Nathaniel Silsbee	DR	MA-2	March 4, 1817		Last term while serving in the House.
86	Jesse Slocumb	F	NC-4	March 4, 1817		Elected to this Congress: August 13, 1819. Died: December 20, 1820.
87	James S. Smith	DR	NC-8	March 4, 1817		Elected to this Congress: August 13, 1819. Chairman: Accounts. Last term while serving in the House.
88	Alexander Smyth	DR	VA-6	March 4, 1817		Elected to this Congress: April 1819
89	Henry R. Storrs	F	NY-16	March 4, 1817		Last term while serving in the House until 18th Congress.
90	George Strother	DR	VA-10	March 4, 1817		Elected to this Congress: April 1819. Resigned while still serving in the House: February 10, 1820.
91	Christian Tarr	DR	PA-13	March 4, 1817		Last term while serving in the House.
92	William Terrell	DR	GA-al	March 4, 1817		Last term while serving in the House.
93	Caleb Tompkins	DR	NY-3	March 4, 1817		Last term while serving in the House.
94	David Trimble	DR	KY-1	March 4, 1817		Chairman: Expenditures in the Treasury Department. Chairman: Elections (1820–21).
95	Starling Tucker	DR	SC-4	March 4, 1817		
96	Nathaniel Upham	DR	NH-al	March 4, 1817		Elected to this Congress: March 9, 1819
97	David Walker	DR	KY-6	March 4, 1817		Died while still serving in the House: March 1, 1820
98	Felix Walker	DR	NC-12	March 4, 1817		Elected to this Congress: August 13, 1819
99	John Murray	DR	PA-10	October 14, 1817		Last term while serving in the House.
100	Jonathan Mason	F	MA-1	November 17, 1817		Resigned while still serving in the House: May 15, 1820
101	Eldred Simkins	DR	SC-5	January 24, 1818		Chairman: Public Expenditures. Last term while serving in the House.
102	Thomas J. Rogers	DR	PA-6	March 3, 1818		
103	Samuel Moore	DR	PA-6	October 13, 1818		
104	Enoch Lincoln	DR	MA-20	November 4, 1818		
105	Thomas Butler	DR	LA-al	November 16, 1818		Last term while serving in the House.
106	Jacob Hostetter	DR	PA-4	November 16, 1818		Last term while serving in the House.
107	William Davidson	F	NC-11	December 2, 1818		Last term while serving in the House.
108	Charles Fisher	DR	NC-10	February 11, 1819		Elected to this Congress: August 13, 1819. Last term while serving in the House until 26th Congress.
...	Robert R. Reid	DR	GA-al	February 18, 1819		Special election to this Congress (vice Forsyth, before term started): January 14, 1819
109	William Darlington	DR	PA-2	March 4, 1819	1815-1817	
110	Benjamin Hardin	DR	KY-10	March 4, 1819	1815-1817	
111	Joseph Hemphill	F	PA-1	March 4, 1819	1801-1803	Previously served (F) 1801-03 while in the House.
112	Alney McLean	DR	KY-5	March 4, 1819	1815-1817	Last term while serving in the House.
113	James Parker	DR	MA-18	March 4, 1819	1813-1815	Elected to this Congress: April 5, 1819. Last term while serving in the House.
114	Charles Hooks	DR	NC-5	March 4, 1819	1816-1817	
115	Mark Alexander	DR	VA-18	March 4, 1819		Elected to this Congress: April 1819
116	Nathaniel Allen	DR	NY-21	March 4, 1819		Only term while serving in the House.
117	Robert Allen	DR	TN-4	March 4, 1819		Elected to this Congress: August 5–6, 1819
118	Caleb Baker	DR	NY-20	March 4, 1819		Only term while serving in the House.
119	Joseph Brevard	DR	SC-8	March 4, 1819		Only term while serving in the House.
120	William Brown	DR	KY-3	March 4, 1819		Only term while serving in the House.
121	Henry Brush	DR	OH-3	March 4, 1819		Chairman: Expenditures in the War Department. Only term while serving in the House.
122	Henry H. Bryan	DR	TN-6	March 4, 1819		Elected to this Congress: August 5–6, 1819. Only term as elected to 17th Congress but did not qualify.
123	Joseph Buffum, Jr.	DR	NH-al	March 4, 1819		Elected to this Congress: March 9, 1819. Only term while serving in the House.
124	Hutchins G. Burton	DR	NC-2	March 4, 1819		Elected to this Congress: August 13, 1819
125	Walter Case	DR	NY-6	March 4, 1819		Only term while serving in the House.
126	Robert Clark	DR	NY-8	March 4, 1819		Only term while serving in the House.
127	John Cocke	DR	TN-2	March 4, 1819		Elected to this Congress: August 5–6, 1819
128	Daniel P. Cook	DR	IL-al	March 4, 1819		Elected to this Congress: August 8, 1819
129	Joshua Cushman	DR	MA-19	March 4, 1819		
130	John A. Cuthbert	DR	GA-al	March 4, 1819		Only term while serving in the House.
131	George Denison	DR	PA-10	March 4, 1819		
132	Jacob H. De Witt	DR	NY-7	March 4, 1819		Only term while serving in the House.
133	John D. Dickinson	F	NY-10	March 4, 1819		
134	Edward Dowse	DR	MA-13	March 4, 1819		Resigned while serving in the House: 26 May 1820
135	Samuel Eddy	DR	RI-al	March 4, 1819		
136	Henry W. Edwards	DR	CT-al	March 4, 1819		
137	Samuel Edwards	F	PA-1	March 4, 1819		
138	John Fay	DR	NY-14	March 4, 1819		Only term while serving in the House.
139	Samuel A. Foot	DR	CT-al	March 4, 1819		Only term until 18th Congress
140	William D. Ford	DR	NY-18	March 4, 1819		Only term while serving in the House.
141	Thomas Forrest	F	PA-1	March 4, 1819		Chairman: Agriculture. Only term while serving in the House until seated in 17th Congress.
142	David Fullerton	DR	PA-5	March 4, 1819		Resigned while still serving in the House: May 15, 1820
143	Ezra C. Gross	DR	NY-12	March 4, 1819		Only term while serving in the House.
144	Samuel Gross	DR	PA-2	March 4, 1819		
145	Aaron Hackley, Jr.	DR	NY-17	March 4, 1819		Only term while serving in the House.
146	George Hall	DR	NY-19	March 4, 1819		Only term while serving in the House.
147	Nathaniel Hazard	DR	RI-al	March 4, 1819		Died while serving in the House: December 17, 1820
148	Jacob Hibshman	DR	PA-3	March 4, 1819		Only term while serving in the House.
149	Mark L. Hill	DR	MA-16	March 4, 1819		Elected to this Congress: July 26, 1819
150	James Jones	DR	VA-19	March 4, 1819		Elected to this Congress: April 1819
151	Jonas Kendall	F	MA-12	March 4, 1819		Only term while serving in the House.
152	Martin Kinsley	DR	MA-17	March 4, 1819		Elected to this Congress: July 26, 1819. Only term while serving in the House.
153	Samuel Lathrop	F	MA-5	March 4, 1819		Elected to this Congress: April 5, 1819
154	Joseph S. Lyman	DR	NY-15	March 4, 1819		Only term while serving in the House.
155	John McCreary	DR	SC-7	March 4, 1819		Only term while serving in the House.
156	Ezra Meech	DR	VT-al	March 4, 1819		Only term until 19th Congress
157	Henry Meigs	DR	NY-2	March 4, 1819		Chairman: Expenditures on Public Buildings. Only term while serving in the House.
158	Thomas Metcalfe	DR	KY-4	March 4, 1819		
159	Robert Monell	DR	NY-15	March 4, 1819		Only term while serving in the House until 21st Congress
160	Raphael Neale	F	MD-1	March 4, 1819		
161	James Overstreet	DR	SC-3	March 4, 1819		
162	Severn E. Parker	DR	VA-13	March 4, 1819		Elected to this Congress: April 1819. Only term while serving in the House.
163	Harmanus Peek	DR	NY-13	March 4, 1819		Chairman: Expenditures in the State Department (1820–21). Only term while serving in the House.
164	Elisha Phelps	DR	CT-al	March 4, 1819		Only term while serving in the House until 19th Congress.
165	Robert Philson	DR	PA-8	March 4, 1819		Only term while serving in the House.
166	Charles Pinckney	DR	SC-1	March 4, 1819		Only term while serving in the House.
167	Nathaniel Pitcher	DR	NY-12	March 4, 1819		
168	William Plumer, Jr.	DR	NH-al	March 4, 1819		Elected to this Congress: March 9, 1819
169	Christopher Rankin	DR	MS-al	March 4, 1819		Elected to this Congress: August 2–3, 1819
170	Jonathan Richmond	DR	NY-20	March 4, 1819		Only term while serving in the House.
171	Thomas R. Ross	DR	OH-6	March 4, 1819		
172	John Russ	DR	CT-al	March 4, 1819		
173	John Sloane	DR	OH-1	March 4, 1819		
174	Bernard Smith	DR	NJ-al	March 4, 1819		Only term while serving in the House.
175	James Stevens	DR	CT-al	March 4, 1819		Only term while serving in the House.
176	Randall S. Street	F	NY-4	March 4, 1819		Only term while serving in the House.
177	James Strong	F	NY-5	March 4, 1819		Only term while serving in the House until 18th Congress.
178	Gideon Tomlinson	DR	CT-al	March 4, 1819		
179	Albert H. Tracy	DR	NY-21	March 4, 1819		
180	George Tucker	DR	VA-15	March 4, 1819		Elected to this Congress: April 1819
181	Solomon Van Rensselaer	F	NY-9	March 4, 1819		
182	Thomas Van Swearingen	F	VA-2	March 4, 1819		Elected to this Congress: April 1819
183	Henry R. Warfield	F	MD-3	March 4, 1819		
184	Jared Williams	DR	VA-3	March 4, 1819		Elected to this Congress: April 1819
185	Silas Wood	F	NY-1	March 4, 1819		
Members joining the House, after the start of the Congress
186	John Crowell	DR	AL-al	December 14, 1819		Previously Delegate January 29, 1818–19. Elected to this Congress: September 20–21, 1819. First Representative from new state. Only term while serving in the House.
...	William S. Archer	DR	VA-17	January 3, 1820		Special election
...	Rollin C. Mallary	DR	VT-al	January 13, 1820		Seated after election challenge: January 13, 1820
...	James Guyon, Jr.	DR	NY-1	January 14, 1820		Seated after election contest. Only term while serving in the House.
...	Charles Kinsey	DR	NJ-al	February 2, 1820		Previously served (DR) 1817-19 while in the House. Special election: February 1–2, 1820. Last term while serving in the House.
...	Thomas Montgomery	DR	KY-9	August 1, 1820		Previously served (DR) 1813-15 while in the House. Special election: August 7, 1820.
...	John C. Gray	DR	VA-20	August 28, 1820		Special election: August 3, 7, 21, 23, 1820. Only term while serving in the House.
...	William Eustis	DR	MA-13	August 21, 1820		Previously served (DR) 1801–05. Special election.
...	Thomas G. McCullough	F	PA-5	October 17, 1820		Special election: October 10, 1820. Only term while serving in the House.
...	Edward B. Jackson	DR	VA-1	October 23, 1820		Special election: October 2, 9, 16, 23, 1820
...	Joseph Dane	F	ME-al	November 6, 1820		Seat replaced MA-14. First Representative elected from new state. Special election.
...	Benjamin Gorham	DR	MA-1	November 6, 1820		Special election
...	Francis Johnson	DR	KY-6	November 13, 1820		Special election: August 7, 1820
...	Thomas L. Moore	DR	VA-10	November 13, 1820		Special election: August 21, 28, 1820
...	Aaron Hobart	DR	MA-8	November 24, 1820		Special election
...	Daniel Udree	DR	PA-7	December 26, 1820		Previously served (DR) October 12, 1813-15 while in the House. Special election. Last term while serving in the House until seated in 17th Congress.
...	William S. Blackledge	DR	NC-4	February 7, 1821		Special election: January 18–19, 1821
Non voting members
a	John Scott	-	MO-al	August 4, 1817		Delegate from Missouri Territory. Previously served (Ind) August 6, 1816 – January 13, 1817. Last term until Representative in 17th Congress.
b	William Woodbridge	-	MI-al	March 4, 1819		Delegate from Michigan Territory. Resigned: August 9, 1820.
c	James W. Bates	-	AR-al	December 21, 1819		Delegate from Arkansas Territory
d	Solomon Sibley	-	MI-al	November 20, 1820		Delegate from Michigan Territory. Special election.

== See also ==
- 16th United States Congress
- List of United States congressional districts
- List of United States senators in the 16th Congress
