= John Ross (Pennsylvania politician) =

American politician

John Ross (February 24, 1770 in Solebury, Bucks County, Pennsylvania – January 31, 1834 in Easton, Northampton County, Pennsylvania), was an American lawyer, jurist, and politician who served as a Representative to the U.S. Congress from Pennsylvania.

== Biography ==
Ross studied law in West Chester, Pennsylvania. He was admitted to the bar in 1792 and engaged in practice in Easton, Pennsylvania.

=== Early career ===
He served as a member of the Pennsylvania State House of Representatives in 1800. He was clerk of the orphans’ court and recorder from 1800 to 1803, county register from 1800 to 1809, and burgess of Easton in 1804.

=== Congress ===
Ross was elected as a Republican to the Eleventh Congress. He was again elected to the Fourteenth and Fifteenth Congresses.

=== Later career ===
He resigned in 1818 to become president judge of the seventh judicial district of the State. He was transferred to the State supreme bench in 1830 and served until his death.

=== Family ===
Ross was married to Mary Ross (1774–1845); they were the parents of Thomas Ross, another congressman.

=== Death and burial ===
He was buried in a private cemetery on the family estate, "Ross Common Manor", Ross Township, Pennsylvania. He was buried next to his wife.

=== Legacy ===
Ross Common Manor was added to the National Register of Historic Places in 1978.

== Sources ==
- United States Congress. "John Ross (id: R000449)". Biographical Directory of the United States Congress.
- The Political Graveyard

U.S. House of Representatives
Preceded by Robert Brown, John Pugh, John Hiester	Member of the U.S. House of Representatives from Pennsylvania's 2nd congressional district 1809–1811 with Robert Brown and William Milnor	Succeeded by Robert Brown, Jonathan Roberts, William Rodman
Preceded by Robert Brown, Samuel D. Ingham	Member of the U.S. House of Representatives from Pennsylvania's 6th congressional district 1815–1818 with Samuel D. Ingham	Succeeded by Thomas Jones Rogers, Samuel Moore
