= John Tod =

American judge & politician (1779–1830)

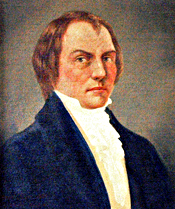

Member of the U.S. House of Representatives from Pennsylvania's 8th district
- In office 1821–1823
- Preceded by: Robert Philson
- Succeeded by: Samuel D. Ingham, Thomas Jones Rogers

Member of the U.S. House of Representatives from Pennsylvania's 13th congressional district
- In office 1823–1824
- Preceded by: Andrew Stewart
- Succeeded by: Alexander Thomson

Member of the Pennsylvania Senate for the 14th district
- In office 1815–1818
- Preceded by: district created
- Succeeded by: William Piper

Member of the Pennsylvania House of Representatives
- In office 1810–1813

Personal details
- Born: 1779 Suffield, Connecticut, US
- Died: March 27, 1830 (aged 50–51) Bedford, Pennsylvania, US
- Party: Democratic-Republican

John Tod (1779 – March 27, 1830) was an American judge and politician who served as a Democratic-Republican member of the U.S. House of Representatives for Pennsylvania's 8th congressional district from 1821 to 1823 and for Pennsylvania's 13th congressional district from 1823 to 1824. He served as a member of the Pennsylvania State Senate for the 14th district from 1815 to 1818 including as Speaker from 1815 to 1816 and as a member of the Pennsylvania House of Representatives from 1810 to 1813 including two terms as Speaker.

He served as presiding judge of the Pennsylvania Courts of Common Pleas for the 16th district from 1824 to 1827 and as an associate judge of the Pennsylvania Supreme Court from 1827 until his death in 1830.

== Early years and education ==
In 1779, Tod was born in Suffield, Connecticut, and was educated in the common schools and at Yale College. He studied law under his brother George and received his legal certificate around 1799. He moved with his father to Aquasco, Maryland, and began teaching as Assistant Master of Charlotte Hall. In 1802, he moved to Bedford, Pennsylvania, was admitted to the bar in 1803 and commenced the practice of law. In 1805, he worked as postmaster of Bedford and served as a clerk to the county commissioners of Bedford County, Pennsylvania, in 1806 and 1807.

== Career ==
Tod was a member of the Pennsylvania House of Representatives from 1810 to 1813, serving twice as its Speaker. He served as a member of the Pennsylvania State Senate for the 14th district from 1815 to 1818 including as Speaker from 1815 to 1816.

In 1820–1821, he was elected to the Seventeenth and then later into the Eighteenth Congress and served until his resignation from Congress in 1824. He served as chairman of the United States House Committee on Manufactures during the Seventeenth and Eighteenth Congresses.

In March–April 1824, Tod was honored with a single vote at the Democratic-Republican Party Caucus to be the party's candidate for U.S. Vice President at the election later that year.

Tod served as presiding judge of the Pennsylvania Court of Common pleas for the sixteenth judicial district from 1824 from 1827 and as associate judge of the Pennsylvania Supreme Court from 1827 until his death in 1830.

Tod died on March 27, 1830, at about the age of 50 in Bedford, Pennsylvania.

== Personal life ==
In 1810, he married Mary Read Hanna, the daughter of U.S. Representative John A. Hanna, and together they had five children.

== See also ==
- Speaker of the Pennsylvania House of Representatives

== Sources ==
- United States Congress. "John Tod (id: T000290)". Biographical Directory of the United States Congress.
- The Political Graveyard

Pennsylvania House of Representatives
Preceded by	Member of the Pennsylvania House of Representatives; 1810-1813	Succeeded by
Pennsylvania State Senate
Preceded by District Created	Member of the Pennsylvania Senate, 14th district 1815-1818	Succeeded by William Piper
U.S. House of Representatives
Preceded by Robert Philson	Member of the U.S. House of Representatives from Pennsylvania's 8th congressional district 1821–1823	Succeeded by Samuel D. Ingham; Thomas Jones Rogers
Preceded by Andrew Stewart	Member of the U.S. House of Representatives from Pennsylvania's 13th congressional district 1823–1824	Succeeded by Alexander Thomson
