= List of United States senators in the 15th Congress =

This is a complete list of United States senators during the 15th United States Congress listed by seniority from March 4, 1817, to March 3, 1819.

Order of service is based on the commencement of the senator's first term. Behind this is former service as a senator (only giving the senator seniority within their new incoming class), service as vice president, a House member, a cabinet secretary, or a governor of a state. The final factor is the population of the senator's state.

The two main parties at this point were the Federalists (F), and Democratic Republicans (DR). At the end of this congress, there was one person elected who was an Anti-Democrat (AD).

== Terms of service ==
Class	Terms of service of senators that expired in years
Class 3	Terms of service of senators that expired in 1819 (CT, GA, IL, IN, KY, LA, MD, NC, NH, NY, OH, PA, SC, and VT.)
Class 1	Terms of service of senators that expired in 1821 (CT, DE, IN, MA, MD, MS, NJ, NY, OH, PA, RI, TN, VA, and VT.)
Class 2	Terms of service of senators that expired in 1823 (DE, GA, IL, KY, LA, MA, MS, NC, NH, NJ, RI, SC, TN, and VA.)

== U.S. Senate seniority list ==
U.S. Senate seniority
Rank	Senator (party-state)	Seniority date	Other factors
1	John Gaillard (F-SC)	December 6, 1804	
2	Charles Tait (F-GA)	November 27, 1809	
3	Outerbridge Horsey (F-DE)	January 12, 1810	
4	Samuel Whittlesey Dana (F-CT)	December 4, 1810	
5	William Hunter (F-RI)	October 28, 1811	
6	Dudley Chase (DR-VT)	March 4, 1813	Vermont 14th in population (1810)
7	Eligius Fromentin (DR-LA)	March 4, 1813	Louisiana 17th in population (1810)
8	Rufus King (F-NY)	March 4, 1813	Former senator
9	Abner Lacock (DR-PA)	March 4, 1813	Former representative (2 years)
10	Jeremiah Morrow (DR-OH)	March 4, 1813	Former representative (10 years)
11	David Daggett (F-CT)	May 13, 1813	
12	Robert Henry Goldsborough (F-MD)	May 21, 1813	
13	Jeremiah Mason (F-NH)	June 10, 1813	
14	Jonathan Roberts (DR-PA)	February 24, 1814	
15	James Barbour (DR-VA)	January 2, 1815	
16	Isham Talbot (DR-KY)	February 2, 1815	
17	Benjamin Ruggles (DR-OH)	March 4, 1815	Ohio 13th in population (1810)
18	Nathan Sanford (DR-NY)	March 4, 1815	New York 1st in population (1810)
19	Isaac Tichenor (F-VT)	March 4, 1815	Former senator
20	James Jefferson Wilson (DR-NJ)	March 4, 1815	New Jersey 12th in population (1810)
21	George Washington Campbell (DR-TN)	October 10, 1815	Former senator
22	John Williams (DR-TN)	October 10, 1815	
23	Nathaniel Macon (DR-NC)	December 5, 1815	
24	Eli Porter Ashmun (F-MA)	June 12, 1816	
25	William Smith (DR-SC)	November 3, 1816	South Carolina 6th in population (1810)
26	George Michael Troup (DR-GA)	November 13, 1816	
27	Montfort Stokes (DR-NC)	December 4, 1816	North Carolina 4th in population (1810)
28	James Noble (DR-IN)	December 11, 1816	Alphabetical (N)
29	Waller Taylor (DR-IN)	December 11, 1816	Alphabetical (T)
30	Alexander Contee Hanson (F-MD)	December 20, 1816	
31	John Wayles Eppes (DR-VA)	March 4, 1817	Former representative (10 years)
32	Harrison Gray Otis (F-MA)	March 4, 1817	Former representative (4 years)
33	Nicholas Van Dyke (F-DE)	March 4, 1817	Former representative (3 years, 4 months)
34	William Charles Cole Claiborne (DR-LA)	March 4, 1817	Former representative (3 years, 3 months)
35	Mahlon Dickerson (DR-NJ)	March 4, 1817	Former governor
36	John Jordan Crittenden (DR-KY)	March 4, 1817	Kentucky 7th in population (1810)
37	David Lawrence Morril (DR-NH)	March 4, 1817	New Hampshire 15th in population (1810)
38	James Burrill, Jr. (F-RI)	March 4, 1817	Rhode Island 16th in population (1810)
39	Clement Storer (DR-NH)	June 27, 1817	
40	James Fisk (DR-VT)	November 4, 1817	
41	Walter Leake (DR-MS)	December 10, 1817	Alphabetical (L)
42	Thomas Hill Williams (DR-MS)	December 10, 1817	Alphabetical (W)
43	Henry Johnson (DR-LA)	January 12, 1818	
44	Prentiss Mellen (F-MA)	June 5, 1818	
45	John Henry Eaton (DR-TN)	September 5, 1818	
46	William Adams Palmer (DR-VT)	October 20, 1818	
47	John Forsyth (DR-GA)	November 23, 1818	
48	Ninian Edwards (DR-IL)	December 3, 1818	
49	Jesse Burgess Thomas (DR-IL)	December 3, 1818	Former delegate

== See also ==
- 15th United States Congress
- List of United States representatives in the 15th Congress
