= List of United States senators in the 16th Congress =

This is a complete list of United States senators during the 16th United States Congress listed by seniority from March 4, 1819, to March 3, 1821.

Order of service is based on the commencement of the senator's first term. Behind this is former service as a senator (only giving the senator seniority within their new incoming class), service as vice president, a House member, a cabinet secretary, or a governor of a state. The final factor is the population of the senator's state.

The two main parties at this point were the Federalists (F), and Democratic Republicans (DR).

== Terms of service ==
Class	Terms of service of senators that expired in years
Class 1	Terms of service of senators that expired in 1827 (CT, DE, IN, MA, MD, ME, MS, NJ, NY, OH, PA, RI, TN, VA, and VT.)
Class 2	Terms of service of senators that expired in 1829 (AL, DE, GA, IL, KY, LA, MA, ME, MS, NC, NH, NJ, RI, SC, and VA.)
Class 3	Terms of service of senators that expired in 1831 (AL, CT, GA, IL, IN, KY, LA, MD, NC, NH, NY, OH, PA, SC, TN, and VT.)

== U.S. Senate seniority list ==
U.S. Senate seniority
Rank	Senator (party-state)	Seniority date	Other factors
1	John Gaillard (DR-SC)	December 6, 1804	
2	Outerbridge Horsey (F-DE)	January 12, 1810	
3	Samuel Whittlesey Dana (F-CT)	December 4, 1810	
4	William Hunter (F-RI)	October 8, 1811	
5	Rufus King (F-NY)	March 4, 1813	
6	Jonathan Roberts (DR-PA)	February 24, 1814	
7	James Barbour (DR-VA)	January 2, 1815	
8	Isaac Tichenor (F-VT)	March 4, 1815	Former senator
9	Nathan Sanford (DR-NY)	March 4, 1815	New York 1st in population (1810)
10	James Jefferson Wilson (DR-NJ)	March 4, 1815	New Jersey 12th in population (1810)
11	Benjamin Ruggles (DR-OH)	March 4, 1815	Ohio 13th in population (1810)
12	John Williams (DR-TN)	October 10, 1815	
13	Nathaniel Macon (DR-NC)	December 5, 1815	
14	Montfort Stokes (DR-NC)	December 4, 1816	North Carolina 4th in population (1810)
15	William Smith (DR-SC)	December 4, 1816	South Carolina 6th in population (1810)
16	James Noble (DR-IN)	December 11, 1816	Alphabetical (N)
17	Waller Taylor (DR-IN)	December 11, 1816	Alphabetical (T)
18	Alexander Contee Hanson (F-MD)	December 20, 1816	
19	John Wayles Eppes (DR-VA)	March 4, 1817	Former representative (10 years)
20	Harrison Gray Otis (F-MA)	March 4, 1817	Former representative (4 years)
21	Nicholas Van Dyke (F-DE)	March 4, 1817	Former representative (3 years, 4 months)
22	Mahlon Dickerson (DR-NJ)	March 4, 1817	Former governor
23	David Lawrence Morril (DR-NH)	March 4, 1817	New Hampshire 15th in population (1810)
24	James Burrill, Jr. (F-RI)	March 4, 1817	Rhode Island 16th in population (1810)
25	Walter Leake (DR-MS)	December 10, 1817	Alphabetical (L)
26	Thomas Hill Williams (DR-MS)	December 10, 1817	Alphabetical (W)
27	Henry Johnson (DR-LA)	January 12, 1818	
28	Prentiss Mellen (F-MA)	June 5, 1818	
29	John Henry Eaton (DR-TN)	September 5, 1818	
30	William Adams Palmer (DR-VT)	October 20, 1818	
31	Jesse Burgess Thomas (DR-IL)	December 3, 1818	Former delegate
32	Ninian Edwards (DR-IL)	December 3, 1818	
33	James Brown (DR-LA)	March 4, 1819	Former senator
34	Edward Lloyd (DR-MD)	March 4, 1819	Former representative (2 years, 3 months)
35	John Fabyan Parrott (DR-NH)	March 4, 1819	Former representative (2 years, 0 months)
36	Walter Lowrie (DR-PA)	March 4, 1819	Pennsylvania 3rd in population (1810)
37	William Logan (DR-KY)	March 4, 1819	Kentucky 7th in population (1810)
38	James Lanman (DR-CT)	March 4, 1819	Connecticut 9th in population (1810)
39	John Elliott (DR-GA)	March 4, 1819	Georgia 11th in population (1810)
40	William Allen Trimble (DR-OH)	March 4, 1819	Ohio 13th in population (1810)
41	Freeman Walker (DR-GA)	November 6, 1819	
42	Richard Mentor Johnson (DR-KY)	December 10, 1819	
43	James Pleasants (DR-VA)	December 14, 1819	Former representative (8 years)
44	William Rufus de Vane King (DR-AL)	December 14, 1819	Former representative (5 years)
45	John Williams Walker (DR-AL)	December 14, 1819	
46	William Pinkney (DR-MD)	December 21, 1819	
47	Elijah Hunt Mills (F-MA)	June 12, 1820	
48	John Holmes (DR-ME)	June 13, 1820	
49	John Chandler (DR-ME)	June 14, 1820	
50	David Holmes (DR-MS)	August 30, 1820	
51	Isham Talbot (DR-KY)	October 19, 1820	
52	Nehemiah Rice Knight (DR-RI)	January 9, 1821	
53	Samuel Lewis Southard (DR-NJ)	January 26, 1821	

== See also ==
- 16th United States Congress
- List of United States representatives in the 16th Congress
