= List of United States senators in the 18th Congress =

This is a complete list of United States senators during the 18th United States Congress listed by seniority from March 4, 1823, to March 3, 1825.

Order of service is based on the commencement of the senator's first term. Behind this is former service as a senator (only giving the senator seniority within their new incoming class), service as vice president, a House member, a cabinet secretary, or a governor of a state. The final factor is the population of the senator's state.

Senators who were sworn in during the middle of the two-year congressional term (up until the last senator who was not sworn in early after winning the November 1824 election) are listed at the end of the list with no number.

== Terms of service ==
Class	Terms of service of senators that expired in years
Class 3	Terms of service of senators that expired in 1825 (AL, CT, GA, IL, IN, KY, LA, MD, MO, NC, NH, NY, OH, PA, SC, and VT.)
Class 1	Terms of service of senators that expired in 1827 (CT, DE, IN, MA, MD, ME, MO, MS, NJ, NY, OH, PA, RI, TN, VA, and VT.)
Class 2	Terms of service of senators that expired in 1829 (AL, DE, GA, IL, KY, LA, MA, ME, MS, NC, NH, NJ, RI, SC, TN, and VA.)

== U.S. Senate seniority list ==
U.S. Senate seniority
Rank	Senator (party-state)	Seniority date	Other factors
1	John Gaillard (DR-SC)	December 6, 1804	
2	Rufus King (F-NY)	March 4, 1813	
3	James Barbour (DR-VA)	January 2, 1815	
4	Benjamin Ruggles (DR-OH)	March 4, 1815	
5	Nathaniel Macon (DR-NC)	December 5, 1815	
6	James Noble (DR-IN)	December 11, 1816	Alphabetical (N)
7	Waller Taylor (DR-IN)	December 11, 1816	Alphabetical (T)
8	Nicholas Van Dyke (DR-DE)	March 4, 1817	Former representative
9	Mahlon Dickerson (DR-NJ)	March 4, 1817	
10	Thomas Hill Williams (DR-MS)	December 10, 1817	
11	Henry Johnson (DR-LA)	January 12, 1818	
12	William Adams Palmer (DR-VT)	October 20, 1818	
13	Jesse Burgess Thomas (DR-IL)	December 3, 1818	Former delegate
14	Ninian Edwards (DR-IL)	December 3, 1818	
15	James Brown (DR-LA)	March 4, 1819	Former senator
16	Edward Lloyd (DR-MD)	March 4, 1819	Former representative (2 years, 3 months)
17	John Fabyan Parrott (DR-NH)	March 4, 1819	Former representative (2 years, 0 months)
18	Walter Lowrie (DR-PA)	March 4, 1819	Pennsylvania 3rd in population (1810)
19	James Lanman (DR-CT)	March 4, 1819	Connecticut 9th in population (1810)
20	John Elliott (DR-GA)	March 4, 1819	Georgia 11th in population (1810)
21	Richard Mentor Johnson (DR-KY)	December 10, 1819	
22	William Rufus de Vane King (DR-AL)	December 14, 1819	
23	Elijah Hunt Mills (F-MA)	June 12, 1820	
24	John Holmes (Maine politician) (DR-ME)	June 13, 1820	
25	John Chandler (DR-ME)	June 14, 1820	
26	David Holmes (DR-MS)	August 30, 1820	
27	Isham Talbot (DR-KY)	October 19, 1820	
28	Nehemiah Rice Knight (DR-RI)	January 9, 1821	
29	Martin Van Buren (DR-NY)	March 4, 1821	New York 1st in population (1810)
30	Elijah Boardman (DR-CT)	March 4, 1821	Connecticut 9th in population (1810)
31	Horatio Seymour (DR-VT)	March 4, 1821	Vermont 15th in population (1810)
32	James De Wolf (DR-RI)	March 4, 1821	Rhode Island 17th in population (1810)
33	David Barton (DR-MO)	August 10, 1821	Alphabetical (Ba)
34	Thomas Hart Benton (DR-MO)	August 10, 1821	Alphabetical (Be)
35	John Henry Eaton (DR-TN)	September 27, 1821	
36	Nicholas Ware (DR-GA)	November 10, 1821	
37	William Findlay (DR-PA)	December 10, 1821	
38	Ethan Allen Brown (DR-OH)	January 3, 1822	
39	James Lloyd (F-MA)	June 5, 1822	
40	William Kelly (DR-AL)	December 12, 1822	
41	Samuel Smith (DR-MD)	December 17, 1822	
42	John Taylor of Caroline (DR-VA)	December 18, 1822	
43	Andrew Jackson (DR-TN)	March 4, 1823	Former senator
44	John Branch (DR-NC)	March 4, 1823	Former governor; North Carolina 4th in population (1820)
45	Samuel Bell (DR-NH)	March 4, 1823	Former governor; New Hampshire 15th in population (1820)
46	Robert Young Hayne (DR-NH)	March 4, 1823	
	Henry Waggaman Edwards (DR-CT)	October 8, 1823	
47	Joseph McIlvaine (DR-NJ)	November 12, 1823	
48	Thomas Clayton (F-DE)	January 8, 1824	
	Josiah Stoddard Johnston (DR-LA)	January 15, 1824	
	Charles Dominique Joseph Bouligny (DR-LA)	November 19, 1824	
	John McLean (DR-IL)	November 23, 1824	
	Thomas Willis Cobb (DR-GA)	December 6, 1824	
	Littleton Waller Tazewell (DR-VA)	December 7, 1824	

== See also ==
- 18th United States Congress
- List of United States representatives in the 18th Congress
