= Robert Philson =

Irish-American soldier and politician

Robert Philson (c. 1759 – July 25, 1831) was an Irish American soldier and politician.

Philson was born in County Donegal, Ulster, Ireland, and immigrated to Pennsylvania with his uncle John Fletcher. They kept a store in Berlin, Somerset County, Pennsylvania.

In 1794, Philson was arrested for his involvement in the Whiskey Rebellion. He was sent to Philadelphia for trial, but he and his co-defendant, Herman Husband, were acquitted.

Philson served as associate judge of Somerset County, Pennsylvania, for twenty years, and also served as a one-term congressman during the 16th United States Congress.

Philson was commissioned a brigadier general of the Second Brigade, Tenth Division, Pennsylvania militia on May 9, 1800, a position he held during the War of 1812.

U.S. House of Representatives
Preceded by Alexander Ogle	Member of the U.S. House of Representatives from Pennsylvania's 8th congressional district 1819–1821	Succeeded by John Tod
