= Robert Harris (Pennsylvania politician) =

American politician

Member of the U.S. House of Representatives from Pennsylvania's 6th district
- In office March 4, 1823 – March 3, 1827
- Preceded by: See below
- Succeeded by: Innis Green

Personal details
- Born: September 5, 1768 Harris Ferry, Province of Pennsylvania, British America
- Died: September 3, 1851 (aged 82) Harrisburg, Pennsylvania, U.S.
- Party: Jacksonian Democratic-Republican; Jacksonian
- Parent: John Harris Jr. (father)

Robert Harris (September 5, 1768 – September 3, 1851) was an American politician and member of the U.S. House of Representatives from Pennsylvania.

== Biography ==
Robert Harris (son of John Harris Jr., founder of Harrisburg) was born at Harris Ferry in the Province of Pennsylvania (now known as Harrisburg). He assisted in establishing various enterprises, including building of the bridge over the Susquehanna River, the organization of the Harrisburg Bank, and the construction of the Middletown Turnpike Road. He was the surveyor to lay off the road from Chambersburg to Pittsburgh, and also for improving the Susquehanna River. He was appointed commissioner to choose the location of the capitol building in Harrisburg. he was a paymaster in the Army during the War of 1812.

Harris was elected as a Jackson Republican to the Eighteenth Congress and reelected as a Jacksonian to the Nineteenth Congress. He served as prothonotary of Dauphin County, Pennsylvania, and died in Harrisburg in 1851. Interment in Harrisburg Cemetery.

== Sources ==
- United States Congress. "Robert Harris (id: H000250)". Biographical Directory of the United States Congress.
- The Political Graveyard

U.S. House of Representatives
Preceded by Thomas Jones Rogers; Samuel D. Ingham	Member of the U.S. House of Representatives from Pennsylvania's 6th congressional district 1823–1827	Succeeded by Innis Green
