= Samuel Moore (Pennsylvania politician) =

American politician

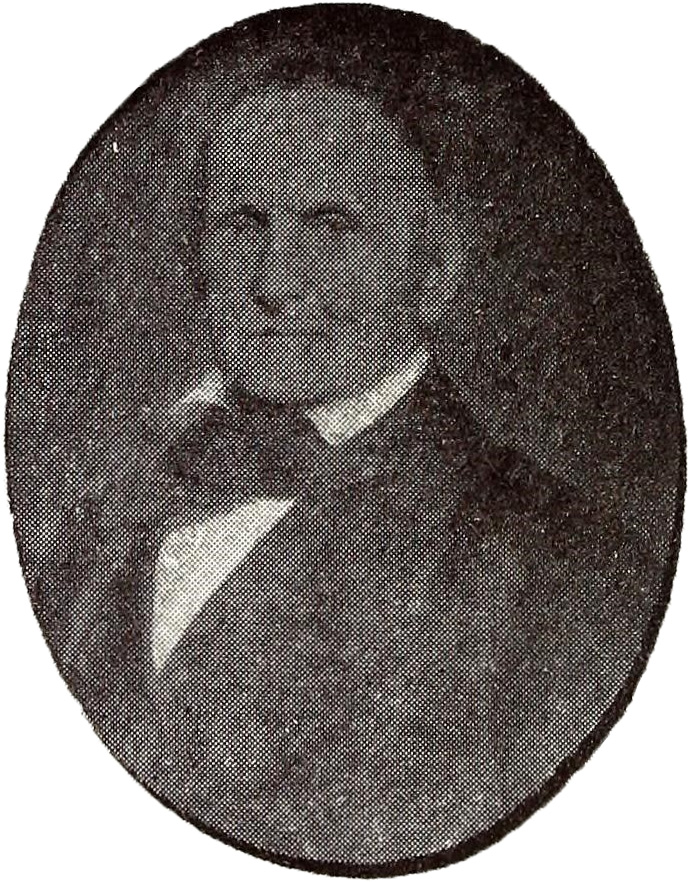

Member of the U.S. House of Representatives from Pennsylvania's 6th district
- In office 1818–1822 Serving with Thomas Jones Rogers
- Preceded by: John Ross; Samuel D. Ingham
- Succeeded by: Thomas Jones Rogers; Samuel D. Ingham

Personal details
- Born: February 8, 1774 Deerfield, Province of New Jersey, British America
- Died: February 18, 1861 (aged 87) Philadelphia, Pennsylvania, U.S.

Samuel Moore (February 8, 1774 – February 18, 1861) was a member of the U.S. House of Representatives from Pennsylvania.

== Formative years and family ==
Samuel Moore was born in Deerfield (now Deerfield Street) in the Province of New Jersey on February 8, 1774. He graduated from the University of Pennsylvania in Philadelphia with an A.B. degree in 1792 and then worked as an instructor at the university from 1792 to 1794.

He studied medicine, opened a medical practice in Dublin, Pennsylvania, and subsequently practiced medicine in Greenwich, New Jersey. Moore also spent several years in trading to the East Indies.

He returned to Bucks County, Pennsylvania, and, in 1808, purchased and operated grist and oil mills in Bridge Point, Pennsylvania, (now Edison) near Doylestown. He later erected and operated a sawmill and wool factory.

In 1832, Moore's daughter, Elizabeth, married Clement Finley, who later became the tenth Surgeon General of the United States Army.

== Public service career ==
Moore was elected as a Republican to the Fifteenth Congress to fill the vacancy caused by the resignation of Samuel D. Ingham. He was reelected to the Sixteenth and Seventeenth Congresses, serving until his resignation on May 20, 1822.

He then served as chairman of the United States House Committee on Indian Affairs during the Seventeenth Congress. He was appointed by President James Monroe as director of the United States Mint on July 15, 1824, holding this office until 1835.

Moore moved to Philadelphia, Pennsylvania, where he became interested in the mining and marketing of coal, serving as president of the Hazleton Coal Company until his death in Philadelphia in 1861. Samuel Moore is interred in The Woodlands Cemetery.

== Sources ==
- United States Congress. "Samuel Moore (id: M000916)". Biographical Directory of the United States Congress.
- The Political Graveyard

U.S. House of Representatives
Preceded by John Ross; Samuel D. Ingham	Member of the U.S. House of Representatives from Pennsylvania's 6th congressional district 1818–1822 alongside: Thomas Jones Rogers	Succeeded by Thomas Jones Rogers; Samuel D. Ingham
Government offices
Preceded by Robert Patterson	5th Director of the United States Mint; 1824–1835	Succeeded by Robert M. Patterson
