= Thomas J. Rogers =

American politician

Thomas Jones Rogers (1781 – December 7, 1832) was a Democratic-Republican member of the U.S. House of Representatives for Pennsylvania's 6th congressional district from 1818 to 1823 and for Pennsylvania's 8th congressional district from 1823 to 1824.

== Early life ==
Thomas J. Rogers (father of William Findlay Rogers) was born in Waterford, Ireland. He immigrated to the United States in 1784 with his parents, who settled in Easton, Pennsylvania. He learned the printing trade and was editor and owner of the Northampton Farmer from 1805 to 1814.

== Career ==
He was a member of the Pennsylvania State Senate for the 8th district from 1815 to 1818. Rogers was elected as a Republican to the Fifteenth Congress to fill the vacancy caused by the resignation of John Ross. He was reelected to the Sixteenth, Seventeenth, and Eighteenth Congresses and served until April 20, 1824, when he resigned.

He served as a trustee of Lafayette College from 1826 to 1832. He was a register and recorder of deeds for Northampton County, Pennsylvania, from 1828 to 1830. He served as brigadier general in the State militia and as an officer in the United States Revenue Customs at the port of Philadelphia.

He died in New York City in 1832 and was interred at the New Market Street Baptist Church Graveyard in Philadelphia, Pennsylvania. He was reinterred to the Glenwood Cemetery in Philadelphia in 1851 and again to the Glenwood Memorial Gardens in Broomall, Pennsylvania.

== Sources ==
- United States Congress. "Thomas J. Rogers (id: R000403)". Biographical Directory of the United States Congress.
- The Political Graveyard

Pennsylvania State Senate
Preceded by Henry Jarrett	Member of the Pennsylvania Senate, 8th district 1815-1818	Succeeded by John Erwin
U.S. House of Representatives
Preceded by John Ross; Samuel D. Ingham	Member of the U.S. House of Representatives from Pennsylvania's 6th congressional district 1818–1823; 1818–1822 alongside: Samuel Moore; 1822–1823 alongside: Samuel D. Ingham	Succeeded by Robert Harris
Preceded by John Tod	Member of the U.S. House of Representatives from Pennsylvania's 8th congressional district 1823–1824 alongside: Samuel D. Ingham	Succeeded by Samuel D. Ingham; George Wolf
