= Samuel D. Ingham =

American politician (1779–1860)

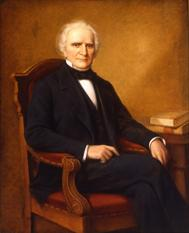
- 1893 posthumous portrait of Ingham

9th United States Secretary of the Treasury
- In office March 6, 1829 – June 20, 1831
- President: Andrew Jackson
- Preceded by: Richard Rush
- Succeeded by: Louis McLane

Member of the U.S. House of Representatives from Pennsylvania's 8th district
- In office March 4, 1823 – March 4, 1829; Seat B
- Preceded by: Seat established
- Succeeded by: Peter Ihrie Jr.

Member of the U.S. House of Representatives from Pennsylvania's 6th district
- In office March 4, 1813 – July 6, 1818; Seat A
- Preceded by: William Crawford
- Succeeded by: Samuel Moore
- In office October 7, 1822 – March 3, 1823; Seat A
- Preceded by: Samuel Moore
- Succeeded by: Robert Harris

Member of the Pennsylvania House of Representatives
- In office 1806–1808

Personal details
- Born: September 16, 1779 New Hope, Pennsylvania, U.S.
- Died: June 5, 1860 (aged 80) Trenton, New Jersey, U.S.
- Party: Democratic-Republican (Before 1825); Democratic (1825–1860)
- Spouse(s): Rebecca Dodd; Deborah Hall

Samuel Delucenna Ingham (September 16, 1779 – June 5, 1860) was an American politician who served as a U.S. representative and the U.S. treasury secretary under President Andrew Jackson.

== Early life and education ==
Ingham was born in Solebury Township, Pennsylvania, on September 16, 1779. His parents were Dr. Jonathan Ingham, "a famous physician from Philadelphia", and his wife, the former Ann Welding.

After a pursuit of classical studies, he was an apprentice to a paper maker along Pennypack Creek, not far from Philadelphia.

== Manufacturer ==
After completing his apprenticeship, Ingham became the manager of a paper mill at Bloomfield, New Jersey. It was while here he met Rebecca Dodd, whom he married in 1800. They had five children.

Also in 1800, Ingham returned to Pennsylvania and established a paper mill on his mother's farm (his father having died in 1793) that would be his main source of employment in the coming years.

== Political career ==
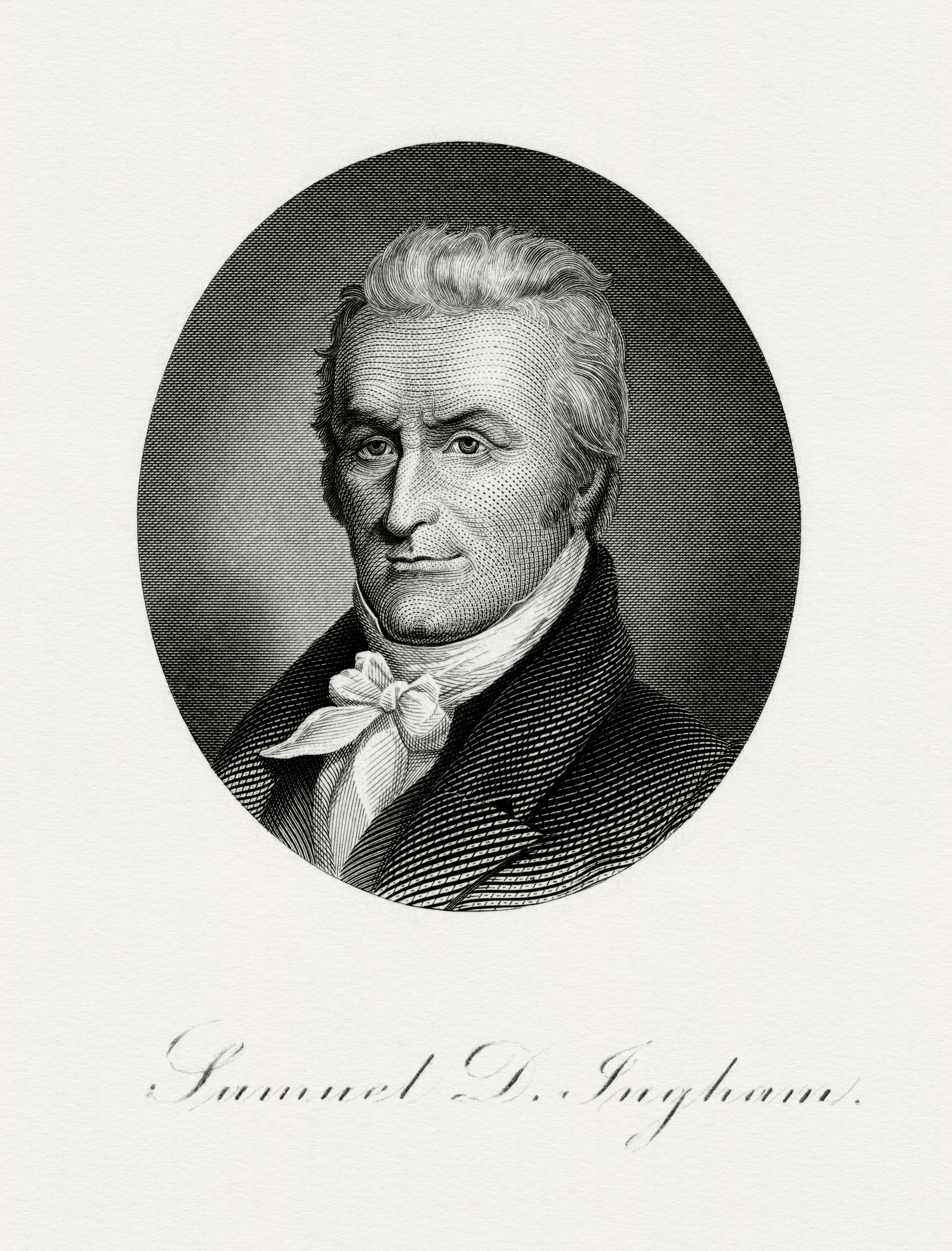
Bureau of Engraving and Printing portrait of Ingham as Secretary of the Treasury

He was a member of the Pennsylvania House of Representatives from 1806 to 1808. Then, Ingham was appointed Justice of the Peace by the Governor of Pennsylvania.

He was a member of the United States House of Representatives from 1813 to July 6, 1818. He easily trounced his Federalist opponents in the first two elections and had no opposition at all in 1816. He resigned from Congress in 1818 because of his wife's ill health. He was appointed the Prothonotary (Chief Clerk, Notary and Registrar of the Court) of the Court of Common Pleas of Bucks County, Pennsylvania, after leaving Congress. In 1819 Rebecca Dodd Ingham died.

Ingham served as Secretary of the Commonwealth of Pennsylvania from 1819 to 1820.

In 1822, Ingham married Deborah Hall of Salem, New Jersey. They would become the parents of three children.

Also in 1822, Ingham was elected to Congress where he would serve until 1829.

During the 13th Congress he was chair of the United States House Committee on Pensions and Revolutionary War Claims. During the 14th, 15th, 19th and 20th Congresses, he was chair of the House Committee on the Post Office and Post Roads, and he was chair of the House Committee on Expenditures in the Post Office Department during the 15th Congress.

=== Secretary of the Treasury ===
Ingham served as the ninth Secretary of the US Treasury from March 6, 1829, to June 21, 1831.

The Second Bank of the United States, viewed by Jackson and much of the nation as an unconstitutional and dangerous monopoly, was Ingham's primary concern as Secretary of the Treasury. Jackson mistrusted the Second Bank of the United States and all other banks.

Jackson thought that there should be no paper currency in circulation but only coins and that the US Constitution was designed to expel paper currency from the monetary system. Ingham believed in the Second Bank and attempted to resolve conflicts between Jackson, who wanted it destroyed, and the Bank's president, Nicholas Biddle.

Despite being unable to reach any resolution between Jackson and Biddle, Ingham left office over an unrelated incident, which stemmed from his involvement in the social ostracism of Peggy Eaton, the wife of Secretary of War John H. Eaton, by a group of Cabinet members and their wives. It was led by Floride Calhoun, the wife of Vice President John C. Calhoun and became known as the Petticoat affair. Eaton challenged Ingham to a duel, which Ingham did not accept. On June 20, 1831, Eaton recruited a posse to search for Ingham, and Ingham responded by arming himself and requesting Jackson's help. With no help forthcoming from the president, Ingham fled to Baltimore the following morning and then to Bucks County, thus likely saving his life.

== Societies ==
During the 1820s, Ingham was a member of the prestigious Columbian Institute for the Promotion of Arts and Sciences, which counted among its members two eventual presidents, Andrew Jackson and John Quincy Adams, and many other prominent men of the day, including well-known representatives of the military, government service, medical, and other professions. In 1840, Ingham was elected as a member to the American Philosophical Society.

== Later life ==
After resigning as Secretary of the Treasury, Ingham resumed the manufacture of paper, and engaged in the development of anthracite coal fields. He was involved with the organization of the Beaver Meadow Railroad Company (Note: The most common name, Beaver Meadow Railroad was in fact, formally incorporated as the Beaver Meadow Railroad and Coal Company.) (e. 1830), of which he was then made president for a time. He was connected with the organization of the Hazleton Coal Company. He worked to promote canals such at the Lehigh Navigation and the Delaware Canal. He moved to Trenton, New Jersey, in 1849, where he worked with that city's Mechanics Bank.

Ingham died on June 5, 1860, in Trenton, New Jersey, at the age of 80, and is interred in the Solebury Presbyterian Churchyard, Solebury, Pennsylvania. Ingham County, Michigan, one of several Cabinet counties named for members of Jackson's administration, is named in Ingham's honor; the city of Lansing, mostly situated in Ingham County, would later become Michigan's capital and center of its third-largest metropolitan area. Ingham Avenue in Trenton, NJ is also named in his honor.

== Notes ==
U.S. House of Representatives
Preceded by William Crawford	Member of the U.S. House of Representatives from Pennsylvania's 6th congressional district Seat A 1813–1818; Served alongside: Robert Brown, Thomas Rogers	Succeeded by Samuel Moore
Preceded by John Rhea	Chair of the House Post Office Committee; 1815–1818	Succeeded by Arthur Livermore
Preceded by Samuel Moore	Member of the U.S. House of Representatives from Pennsylvania's 6th congressional district Seat A 1822–1823; Served alongside: Thomas Rogers	Succeeded by Robert Harris; Single seat
New seat	Member of the U.S. House of Representatives from Pennsylvania's 8th congressional district 1823–1829; Served alongside: Thomas Rogers, George Wolf	Succeeded by Peter Ihrie Jr.
Preceded by John Telemachus Johnson	Chair of the House Post Office Committee; 1825–1828	Succeeded by Samuel McKean
Political offices
Preceded by Richard Rush	United States Secretary of the Treasury; 1829–1831	Succeeded by Louis McLane
