= 1818 Virginia's 19th congressional district special election =

On February 21, 1818, Representative Peterson Goodwyn (DR) of Virginia's 19th district died in office. A special election was held to fill the resulting vacancy.

== Election results ==
Candidate	Party	Votes	Percent
John Pegram	Democratic-Republican	706	53.9%
James Jones	Democratic-Republican	605	46.1%

Pegram took his seat on November 16, at the start of the Second Session of the 15th Congress. Pegram would only serve for that single session, as he would be defeated for re-election in 1819 against James Jones.

== See also ==
- List of special elections to the United States House of Representatives
