= Edward A. Pollard =

American author, journalist, and Confederate sympathizer

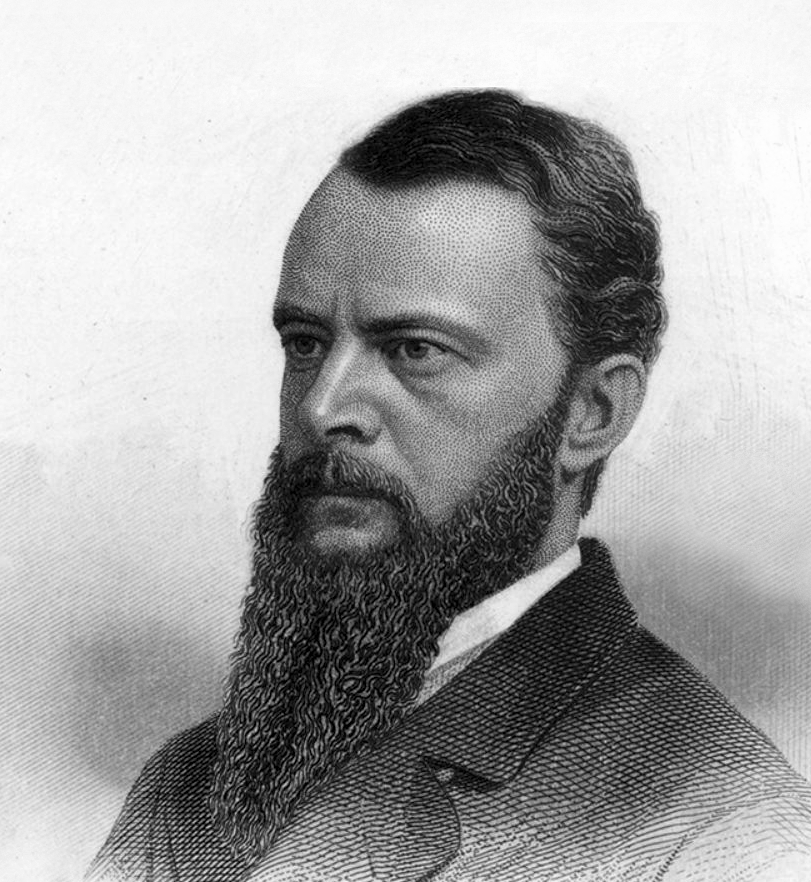
- Portrait of Pollard, 1866
- Born: Edward Alfred Pollard; February 27, 1832; Nelson County, Virginia, U.S.
- Died: December 17, 1872 (aged 40); Lynchburg, Virginia, U.S.
- Education: University of Virginia; College of William and Mary
- Occupation: Writer
- Political party: Democratic
- Spouse: Marie Antoinette Nathalie Dowell (m. 1867)

Signature
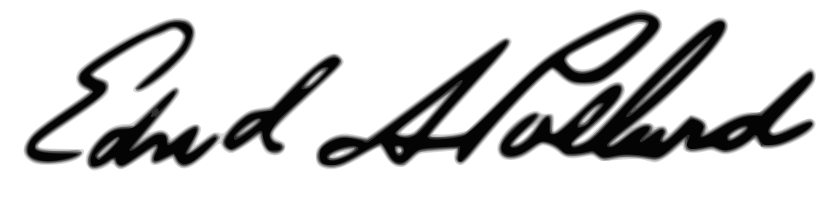

Edward Alfred Pollard (February 27, 1831 – December 17, 1872) was an American author, journalist, and Confederate sympathizer during the American Civil War who wrote several books on the causes and events of the war, notably The Lost Cause: A New Southern History of the War of the Confederates (1866) and The Lost Cause Regained (1868), wherein Pollard originated the long-standing pseudo-historical ideology of the Lost Cause of the Confederacy.

Written after the war, these works advocated white supremacy, supported the relegation of blacks to second-class status, and accused the U.S. government of alleged excesses committed both during and after the war. The books gave two different descriptions of the causes of the war and the nature of Southern society: The Lost Cause claimed the main reason for the war was the two opposing ways (largely slavery) of organizing society, and viewed slavery as key to the nobility of the South, while The Lost Cause Regained argued that the primary reason for secession was not slavery, but the preservation of state sovereignty. The latter viewpoint reflects much of Pollard's post-1867 attempts to reconcile former pro-Confederacy ideas with new realities, patriotism, and free-labor unionism.

== Early life and education ==
Edward Alfred Pollard was born on February 27, 1832, on the Oak Ridge Plantation in Nelson County, Virginia, which his grandfather Robert Rives, had built and made his primary residence until his death when Edward was a boy. Pollard's mother, Paulina Cabell Rives Pollard, descended from the region's powerful (and enslaving) Cabell family, one of the First Families of Virginia and had married Richard Pollard. Edward was the youngest of their children; his eldest brother, James Rives Pollard, would die in 1862. Four of Pollard's maternal uncles served in the Virginia General Assembly, and William Cabell Rives (1793–1868), who inherited Oak Ridge upon his father's death, represented Virginia in both houses of Congress as well as served as a U.S. Ambassador to France.

Edward Pollard received a private education suitable for his class, then attended the University of Virginia in Charlottesville, Virginia (which his grandfather had helped found), graduating in 1849. Although Pollard's uncle Alexander Rives was a prominent local lawyer (and would later become a judge of the Virginia Supreme Court and the U.S. District Judge for the Western District of Virginia), Edward studied law formally first in Williamsburg at the College of William and Mary as well as in Baltimore, where he was admitted to the bar.

== Career ==
Pollard did not establish a legal practice but traveled to California, where he worked for a newspaper until 1855. Pollard would later write that his experiences during the aftermath of the California Gold Rush convinced him that free-labor societies were a competitive war of all against all, which he used in his justifications for slavery. From 1857 to 1861, Pollard was clerk for the United States House Committee on the Judiciary.

During the American Civil War, Pollard was one of the principal editors of the Richmond Examiner (along with Robert William Hughes). The newspaper supported the Confederate States of America but was hostile to Jefferson Davis. In 1864, Pollard attempted to sail for England, but the blockade runner on which he traveled was captured, and Pollard was confined in Fort Warren in Boston Harbor from 29 May until August 12, when he was paroled. In December of that year, Secretary of War Edwin M. Stanton issued an order assigning the again-captured Pollard to close confinement at Fort Monroe. However, he was soon again paroled by General B. F. Butler, whom Pollard had met in Washington, D.C., before the war. In January, Pollard was sent toward Richmond, Virginia, in a planned exchange for Albert D. Richardson (1833–1869), a well-known correspondent of the New York Tribune, but Richardson had escaped before Pollard's arrival.

Pollard wrote several books. In 1859, Pollard advocated reopening the slave trade in Black Diamonds Gathered in the Darkey Homes of the South. Pollard also rejected ideas that slavery improved enslaved people and that slavery should gradually fade away. Unlike his most prominent uncles, William C. and Alexander Rives, Pollard strongly favored secession and continued to write about enslaved society and Union depredations during the American Civil War. After Union forces occupied Richmond in 1865, Pollard was arrested for continuing to publish pro-Confederate and pro-slavery writings, and he decried emancipation as the North's ultimate war crime.

In 1866, Pollard published his most famous work, The Lost Cause: A New Southern History of the War of the Confederates. This book portrayed the war as a contest between "two nations of opposite civilizations" that had been different since colonial times. Unlike the Puritan North, the Cavalier South had developed a "feudal" society based on slave labor, which "established in the South a peculiar and noble type of civilization." Pollard argued that slavery "inculcated notions of chivalry," "polished the manners" of enslavers, and relieved the "demands of physical labor", thus affording the "opportunity for extraordinary culture". Pollard also worried that the wartime defeat might cause the South to "lose its moral and intellectual distinctiveness as a people, and cease to assert its well-known superiority in civilization." Pollard also wrote that "the South wants and insists upon perpetrating" a "war of ideas".

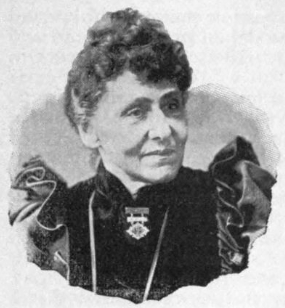
Marie Antoinette Nathalie Dowell

He married Marie Antoinette Nathalie Dowell (née Granier) in March 1867.

The same year, Pollard wrote that the rebellion would reopen and be successful, but the realities of Congressional Reconstruction forced him to reconsider. Also, Republican political gains in late 1867 and the makeup of the Virginia Constitutional Convention of 1868 after many ex-Confederates either could not vote or boycotted led Pollard to believe that southern Democrats should not stand aside from politics in the upcoming 1868 election. Pollard began to think of the Civil War as a constitutional contest rather than an ideological contest of opposing social systems. Pollard began to support President Andrew Johnson as a defender of constitutional liberty. In similar tones, Pollard began speaking of pre-war states-rights advocates such as John C. Calhoun as Unionists who merely sought their constitutional rights, not secession.

In 1868, Pollard advocated white supremacy (calling it both the "true cause of the war" and the "true hope of the South") during Reconstruction in The Lost Cause Regained, which was written as a Democratic campaign document. Pollard wrote that Johnson's programs were right and that secession was not legal. In this book, Pollard no longer supported Jefferson Davis, instead attacking him for being ineffective and ignorant, and a year later he wrote a scathing biography of Davis entitled The Life of Jefferson Davis. Pollard also criticized many other Confederate political and military leaders in that book. Pollard wrote that the Southern way of life had contributed largely to the defeat. Biographer Jack Maddex Jr. believes that Pollard found it hard to navigate inconsistencies between his new-found pro-Union white supremacist position and a pro-Confederate position he also attempted to hold; after Pollard published his biography of Davis, the Confederacy ceased as a central topic in his writings.

Meanwhile, Pollard also edited a weekly paper in Richmond, Virginia, from 1867 to 1869. Moreover, Pollard conducted the Political Pamphlet there during the presidential campaign of 1868.

Pollard's opinions continued to change. By the early 1870s, Pollard wrote favoring northern capitalism and thrift, limited civil rights legislation, and black suffrage. Pollard supported segregation but opposed the Ku Klux Klan, and shortly before his death, wrote that by 1860, slavery had "completed its historic mission and its continuance would have been an inexcusable oppression."

== Death ==
Pollard died on December 17, 1872, in Lynchburg, Virginia, at 40. Pollard was buried in the Rives family cemetery on the Oakridge Plantation, notwithstanding its postwar sale to wealthy investor Oliver Beirne, who let it be used as a residence for his daughter and her husband, the former fire-eater U.S. and Confederate Congressman William Porcher Miles. General Robert E. Lee urged Southerners to move on after the wartime defeat, but after his death in 1870, the Lost Cause movement would be fostered by "unrepentant Confederate" Gen. Jubal Early (who had moved to Lynchburg), and by well-connected Lynchburg lawyer and future U.S. Senator John Warwick Daniel, as well as by former Confederate President Jefferson Davis.

== Bibliography ==
- Black Diamonds Gathered in the Darkey Homes of the South (New York, 1859)
- The Southern History of the War; 3 vols.: Published by Charles B. Richardson, New York City
  - First Year of the War, with B. M. DeWitt, 1862
  - Second Year of the War, 1863
  - Third Year of the War, 1864
- Southern History of the War 2 vols. Charles B. Richardson, New York City (1866)
- Southern History of the Civil War; 4 vols. The Blue & The Gray Press:
  - First Year, Volume 1 (No publication date given)
  - Second Year, Volume 2 (No publication date given)
  - Third Year, Volume 3 (No publication date given)
  - Fourth Year, Volume 4 (No publication date given)
- Observations in the North: Eight Months in Prison and on Parole (1865)
- Pollard, Edward A. (1866). The Lost Cause: A New Southern History of the War of the Confederates. New York: E. B. Treat and Company.
- Lee and His Lieutenants (1867)
- The Lost Cause Regained (1868)
- The Life of Jefferson Davis (1869)
- The Virginia Tourist (1870)

== Sources ==
- Maddex, Jack P. (1974). The Reconstruction of Edward A. Pollard: A Rebel's Conversion to Postbellum Unionism. University of North Carolina Press. ISBN 978-0-8078-5054-1. OCLC 1330614464.
- Chisholm, Hugh, ed. (1911). "Pollard, Edward Albert" . Encyclopædia Britannica. Vol. 22 (11th ed.). Cambridge University Press. p. 2.
