= Sweet Springs =

Sweet Springs may refer to the following places in the United States:

- Sweet Springs, Missouri
- Sweet Springs, West Virginia
