= John Pegram =

John Pegram may refer to:

- John Pegram (politician) (1773–1831), Virginia politician
- John Pegram (general) (1832–1865), Confederate general from Virginia
