= William McCoy (Virginia politician) =

American politician (1768–1835)

Dean of the United States House of Representatives
- In office March 4, 1830 – March 3, 1833
- Preceded by: Thomas Newton Jr.
- Succeeded by: Lewis Williams

Member of the U.S. House of Representatives from Virginia
- In office March 4, 1811 – March 3, 1833
- Preceded by: Jacob Swoope
- Succeeded by: William McComas
- Constituency: 4th district (1811–1823); 19th district (1823–1833)

Chairman of the Committee on Claims
- In office March 4, 1827 – March 3, 1829
- Preceded by: Lewis Williams
- Succeeded by: Elisha Whittlesey

Member of the Virginia House of Delegates from Pendleton County
- In office December 1798–1804 Serving with Jacob Conrad, Jacob Hull and Peter Hull
- Preceded by: Peter Hull
- Succeeded by: John Davis

Personal details
- Born: September 20, 1768 Fauquier County, Virginia Colony, British America
- Died: August 19, 1835 (aged 66) Charlottesville, Virginia, US
- Resting place: University of Virginia Cemetery, Charlottesville, Virginia
- Party: Democratic-Republican (before 1825)
- Other political affiliations: Jacksonian (after 1825)

William McCoy (September 20, 1768 – August 19, 1835) was an American merchant and politician who was a U.S. representative from Virginia from 1811 until 1833.

== Early life ==
William McCoy was born near Warrenton in Fauquier County in the Colony of Virginia.

== Career ==
He moved westward to Pendleton County, which the Virginia legislature had formed from western Rockingham County in 1789 (and part of which would form Highland County in 1845, after this man's death). William McCoy, Oliver McCoy and Jacob Conrad were three of the ten men who were the original trustees of Franklin (the Pendleton county seat), which received a legislative charter in 1794. McCoy operated a store as well as bought a mill (which is now a historic site) three miles south of Franklin from Ulrich Conrad. In the 1820 census, McCoy's household included 12 white people and nine slaves.

Pendleton voters elected McCoy (and re-elected him) as one of their representatives in the Virginia House of Delegates from 1798 to 1804.

Congressman Jacob Swoope of Staunton (the Augusta county seat), the German-speaking local leader of the Federalist party, announced he would not seek re-election to Congress in 1810. Federalists named General Samuel Blackburn as their candidate, because of or despite his acquittal in 1809 of collecting illegal fees from litigants. Despite Pendleton County being the least populous of the six counties in Virginia's 4th congressional district in 1810 (the others being Augusta, Hardy, Rockbridge, Rockingham, and Shenandoah), McCoy ran for the seat and won. He was repeatedly re-elected to the United States House of Representatives. He initially ran as a Democratic-Republican, then as a Crawford Republican and finally as a Jacksonian. Thus he served from 1811 to 1833, with district number changing to Virginia's 19th congressional district in 1822 due redistricting following the censuses of 1820. During the War of 1812, McCoy wrote President James Madison concerning two applications for commissions as military officers. McCoy served as chairman of the Committee on Claims from 1827 to 1829.

McCoy also served as a delegate to the Virginia Constitutional Convention of 1829-1830, one of four men from a state senatorial district that included Augusta, Rockbridge and Pendleton Counties. That convention succeeded in getting more legislative seats for western Virginia, but also wrote slavery into the state constitution. That district's other representatives were Briscoe G. Baldwin, Chapman Johnson and fellow Congressman Samuel McD Moore. In that convention, McCoy served on the Committee of the Executive Department. Although in the rest of the state voters adopted the constitution 24,672 to 7198, his constituents in Pendleton County voted against it 8365 votes to 1383, dissatisfied with the continued voting dominance of planters west of the Blue Ridge Mountains, after which Virginia legislators reduced Pendleton County from two to a single representative in the Virginia House of Delegates.

== Personal life ==
He married Elizabeth Harrison (1760-1804), and outlived both their son John (1803-1823) and their daughter Caroline (1804-1830). Before her death, Caroline had married another William McCoy, who had been assisting his father-in-law with the store, as well as raising their son (also William McCoy). Hence this man in his last will and testament, executed in Washington on April 30, 1832, provided that his late son-in-law would become his executor, and other property would be inherited by his grandson, after making financial provision to Mrs. Dyer, who had helped raise his children and that grandchild.

== Death ==
William McCoy died in Charlottesville, Virginia, in 1835 and was interred in the University of Virginia Cemetery. His mill was inherited by his nephew, also William McCoy (who died in 1864, hence some confusion).

== Electoral history ==
- 1811; McCoy was elected to the U.S. House of Representatives with 52.64% of the vote, defeating Federalist Samuel Blackburn.
- 1813; McCoy was re-elected unopposed.
- 1815; McCoy was re-elected with 51.01% of the vote, defeating Federalist Robert Porterfield.
- 1817; McCoy was re-elected unopposed.
- 1819; McCoy was re-elected unopposed.
- 1821; McCoy was re-elected unopposed.

== Bibliography ==
- "Biographical Directory of the United States Congress, 1774 - Present". bioguide.congress.gov. United States Congress. Archived from the original on April 23, 2010.
- Pulliam, David Loyd (1901). The Constitutional Conventions of Virginia from the foundation of the Commonwealth to the present time. John T. West, Richmond. ISBN 978-1-2879-2059-5.

U.S. House of Representatives
Preceded by Jacob Swoope	Member of the U.S. House of Representatives from Virginia's 4th congressional district 1811–1823	Succeeded by Mark Alexander
Preceded by James Jones	Member of the U.S. House of Representatives from Virginia's 19th congressional district 1823–1833 (obsolete district)	Succeeded by William McComas
