= Virginia's 19th congressional district =

1793–1843 US congressional district

Coordinates: 38°10′N 81°10′W

- Obsolete district
- Created: 1793
- Eliminated: 1843
- Years active: 1793–1843

Virginia's 19th congressional district is an obsolete congressional district in Virginia. It was created in 1793 after the 1790 U.S. census and was eliminated in 1843 after the 1840 U.S. census. Its last congressman was George W. Summers.

== Boundaries ==
The congressional district existed for fifty years. During that time it moved around the Commonwealth, from the east of Virginia to the west (since 1863 in the state of West Virginia). Although all the counties in the district after particular boundary changes have not been confirmed, it is possible to give a general indication of the part of the state involved. This is based on notes in Dubin's book about incomplete returns.

1793–1803: The district included Westmoreland and Northumberland counties in the Northern Neck peninsula of eastern Virginia.

1803–1813: The district number was re-allocated to the south-east of the state, bordering on North Carolina, including Isle of Wight, Southampton, Surry and Sussex counties.

1813–1823: The district moved north-west of its previous incarnation to include Dinwiddie and Nottoway counties.

1823–1833: The district moved west to overlap the post 1863-boundary between Virginia and West Virginia, in what at the time was the middle of the Commonwealth. The territory in the district included Bath County, Virginia and what subsequently became Pocahontas County, West Virginia.

1833–1843: The district extended to the western edge of the pre-1863 Virginia. It included the now West Virginia counties of Cabell, Fayette, Logan and Nicholas.

== List of members representing the district ==
Representative	Party	Term	Cong ress	Electoral history
District established March 4, 1793
John Heath (Northumberland County)	Anti-Administration	March 4, 1793 – March 3, 1795	3rd 4th	Elected in 1793. Re-elected in 1795. Retired.
John Heath (Northumberland County)	Democratic-Republican	March 4, 1795 – March 3, 1797	3rd 4th	Elected in 1793. Re-elected in 1795. Retired.
Walter Jones (Hayfield)	Democratic-Republican	March 4, 1797 – March 3, 1799	5th	Elected in 1797. Lost re-election.
Henry Lee (Stratford Hall)	Federalist	March 4, 1799 – March 3, 1801	6th	Elected in 1799. Retired.
John Taliaferro (Fredericksburg)	Democratic-Republican	March 4, 1801 – March 3, 1803	7th	Elected in 1801. Retired.
Edwin Gray	Democratic-Republican	March 4, 1803 – March 3, 1813	8th 9th 10th 11th 12th	Redistricted from the 10th district and re-elected in 1803. Re-elected in 1805. Re-elected in 1807. Re-elected in 1809. Re-elected in 1811. Redistricted to the 20th district and lost re-election.
Peterson Goodwyn (Petersburg)	Democratic-Republican	March 4, 1813 – February 21, 1818	13th 14th 15th	Redistricted from the 18th district and re-elected in 1813. Re-elected in 1815. Re-elected in 1817. Died.
Vacant		February 21, 1818 – April 21, 1818	15th	
John Pegram (Dinwiddie)	Democratic-Republican	April 21, 1818 – March 3, 1819	15th	Elected to finish Goodwyn's term. Retired.
James Jones (Hendersonville)	Democratic-Republican	March 4, 1819 – March 3, 1823	16th 17th	Elected in 1819. Re-elected in 1821. Retired.
William McCoy (Franklin)	Democratic-Republican	March 4, 1823 – March 3, 1825	18th 19th 20th 21st 22nd	Redistricted from the 4th district and re-elected in 1823. Re-elected in 1825. Re-elected in 1827. Re-elected in 1829. Re-elected in 1831. Retired.
William McCoy (Franklin)	Jacksonian	March 4, 1825 – March 3, 1833	18th 19th 20th 21st 22nd	Redistricted from the 4th district and re-elected in 1823. Re-elected in 1825. Re-elected in 1827. Re-elected in 1829. Re-elected in 1831. Retired.
William McComas (Cabell County)	Jacksonian	March 4, 1833 – March 3, 1835	23rd 24th	Elected in 1833. Re-elected in 1835. [data missing]
William McComas (Cabell County)	Anti-Jacksonian	March 4, 1835 – March 3, 1837	23rd 24th	Elected in 1833. Re-elected in 1835. [data missing]
Andrew Beirne (Union)	Democratic	March 4, 1837 – March 3, 1841	25th 26th	Elected in 1837. Re-elected in 1839. [data missing]
George W. Summers (Kanawha)	Whig	March 4, 1841 – March 3, 1843	27th	Elected in 1841. Redistricted to the 14th district.
District dissolved March 4, 1843

== Election results ==
When complete vote totals are not available, incomplete vote totals are in brackets. All Virginia general congressional elections, for Virginia, in the period covered by this article, were held after the start of the legal term of the Congress. The congressional term started on March 4 in odd numbered years. The Virginia election was usually held in March or April. The House mostly convened for the first time during one of the last three months of the year.

U.S. House election; March 18, 1793: Virginia, District 19
Party	Candidate	Votes	%	±%
Anti-Administration	John Heath	(95) Elected	N/A	N/A
	Walter Jones	(137) Defeated	N/A	N/A
	Francis Lee	(2) Defeated	N/A	N/A
Majority		N/A	N/A	N/A
Turnout		N/A	N/A	N/A

- Note (1793): Returns from Westmoreland County only. Party label for Heath taken from the Wikipedia article on the 3rd Congress, as Dubin gives no party labels for this election.

U.S. House election; March 16, 1795: Virginia, District 19
Party	Candidate	Votes	%	±%
Democratic-Republican	John Heath	Elected unopposed	N/A	N/A
Majority		N/A	N/A	N/A
Turnout		N/A	N/A	N/A

- Note (1795): Incomplete data.

U.S. House election; March 20, 1797: Virginia, District 19
Party	Candidate	Votes	%	±%
Democratic-Republican	Walter Jones	(127) Elected	N/A	N/A
	-. Ball	(70) Defeated	N/A	N/A
Majority		N/A	N/A	N/A
Turnout		N/A	N/A	N/A

- Note (1797): Returns from Westmoreland County only.
