= Fontville, West Virginia =

Coordinates: 37°37′42″N 80°14′29″W

Fontville, was the name of a town planned to be at the current day location of Sweet Springs, West Virginia. The town was brainchild of William Lewis, brother of Andrew Lewis and Thomas Lewis.

On December 16, 1790, Section Three of an Act of Assembly in Virginia set forth the following:

Thirty acres of land on the southeast side of Sweet Springs in Botetourt County, Virginia, which was the property of William Lewis, would be vested in James Breckinridge, Martin McFerran, Henry Bowyer, Matthew Harvey, John Beal, John Wood, John Smith, Robert Harvey, John Hawkins, Thomas Madison, and Sampson Sawyers. This land was to be laid off into lots of half an acre each with convenient streets and established into a town to be called "Fontville".

The lots were then going to be advertised in the Virginia Gazette for two months and sold at public auction. The purchaser was then expected to build within five years from the day of purchase. Houses were to be at least sixteen feet square and have stone chimneys. The trustees were responsible for settling any boundary disputes and making rules about house building. Further sections of the Act of Assembly stated that no person would be allowed to own more than two lots and that nothing in the sections authorized the trustees to sell the land on which William Lewis built his courthouse or tavern.

The reason the town never sprang into existence is unknown but that did not stop William Lewis from continuing his dreams of expansion. He ended up developing an extremely successful resort, Sweet Springs Resort, and tried to entice the circuit court to relocate there by finishing a courthouse and jail on the property.

Selected images

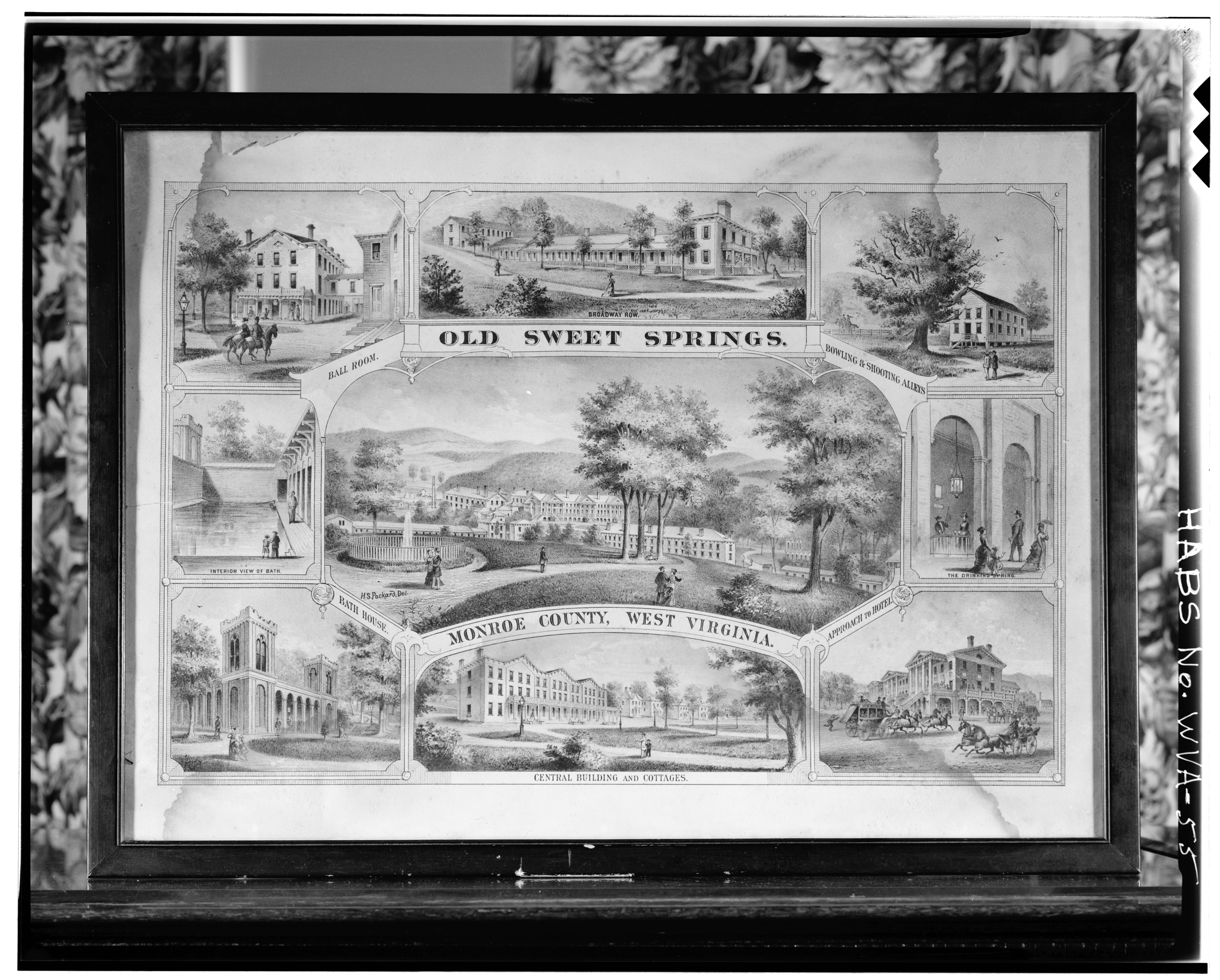
Sweet Springs, General View

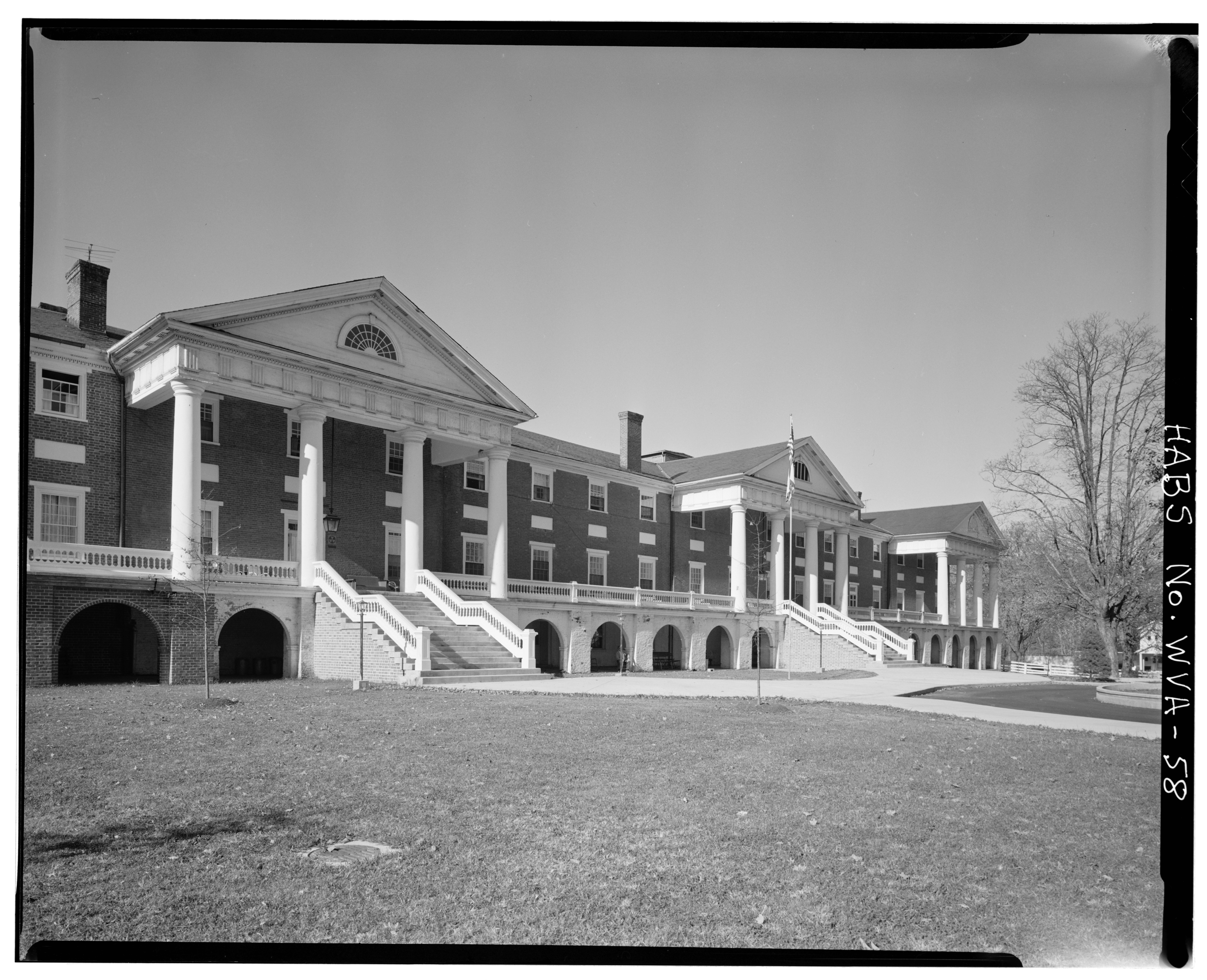
Main building "Sweet Springs Hotel", State Route 311, Sweet Springs in 1933
