= Jacob Swoope =

American politician

Member of the U.S. House of Representatives from Virginia's 4th district
- In office March 4, 1809 – March 3, 1811
- Preceded by: David Holmes
- Succeeded by: William McCoy

Personal details
- Born: ca. 1766 Philadelphia, Province of Pennsylvania, British America
- Died: 1832 (aged 65–66) Staunton, Virginia, U.S.
- Resting place: Staunton, Virginia
- Party: Federalist

Jacob Swoope (October 9, 1766 – March 26, 1832) was an early nineteenth century German speaking miller and politician associated with the Federalist Party who represented Virginia's southern Shenandoah Valley in the U.S. House of Representatives in the 1809-1811 session.

== Early and family life ==
Born in Philadelphia in the Province of Pennsylvania sometime around 1766, Swoope received an education appropriate to his class.

== Career ==
He moved to Staunton, Virginia in 1789 and held several local offices before being elected the first mayor of Staunton under the new charter of 1801. He was reelected mayor in 1804 before being elected a Federalist to the United States House of Representatives in 1808, serving from 1809 to 1811 having defeated Democratic-Republican Daniel Smith.

Swope generally operated his business or household using enslaved labor. In the 1810 census, his household of 21 people included 13 slaves. However, a decade later, his household consisted of only four white people. In the last federal census of his life, Swoope's household included himself and seven slaves.

== Personal life ==
Swoope married Mary Elizabeth McDowell (1772-1816). They had at least four sons and a daughter who reached adulthood. The firstborn son, George Washington Swoope (1796-1869), inherited Wheatland after his father's death, as well as helped build the Virginia Central Railroad. His brothers Jacob Swoope Jr (1800-1841), John Swoope (1804-1861) and Rev. Edgar Swoope (1805-1867) became early settlers of Lawrence County, Alabama. Their elder sister Sarah (b. 1793) married Joseph Brown, and the couple moved to the outskirts of what is now St. Louis, Missouri as well as had at least three sons and three daughters who reached adulthood (including Drs. Benjamin and William Brown, who graduated from the Philadelphia Medical College in 1841 and 1845).

== Death ==
Swoope died in Staunton in 1832 and was interred there in the Trinity Episcopal Churchyard.

An area near Stuanton settled circa 1813 was called "Swoope", since it contained his mansion, "Wheatlands". His son, George Washington Swoope lived there, and helped built the Virginia Central Railroad. During the American Civil War, CSA General Fitzhugh Lee lived at Wheatlands in the winter of 1864/1865, but accounts differ as to which armies burned the surrounding mill and outbuildings. After the conflict, the flour mill was rebuilt, and Swoope was the only depot between Staunton and Craigsville. The mill ran two shifts per day, and sold flour under the brands "Golden Grains" and Millrose" in several states, but was not rebuilt after it burned in 1954. In the late 19th and early 20th century, Swoope also had post office, small school, a cannery and cider mill, and was serviced by two passenger trains daily, as well as freight trains to Covington and Clifton Forge, used for dairy products, lumber and other farm goods.

== See also ==
- List of mayors of Staunton, Virginia

U.S. House of Representatives
Preceded by David Holmes	Member of the U.S. House of Representatives from Virginia's 4th congressional district 1809–1811	Succeeded by William McCoy
