= James Jones (Virginia politician) =

American politician

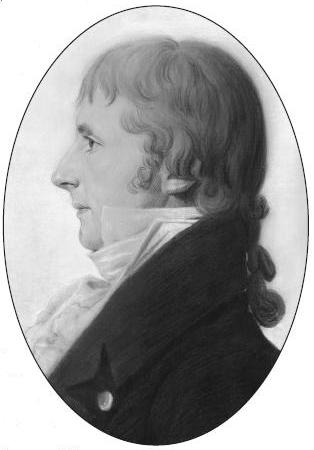
- Engraving of James Jones by Charles Balthazar Julien Févret de Saint-Mémin

Member of the U.S. House of Representatives from Virginia's 19th district
- In office March 4, 1819 – March 3, 1823
- Preceded by: John Pegram
- Succeeded by: William McCoy

Member of the Virginia House of Delegates from the Nottoway County district
- In office December 3, 1827 – December 6, 1829 Serving with Hezekiah R. Anderson
- Preceded by: Nathan Ward
- Succeeded by: Archibald A. Campbell

Member of the Virginia House of Delegates from the Nottoway County district
- In office December 3, 1804 – December 3, 1809 Serving with Tyree G. Bacon, Griffin Lamkin, John Fitzgerald
- Preceded by: Freeman Epes
- Succeeded by: Peter Bland

Personal details
- Born: James Jones; December 11, 1772 Nottoway parish, Amelia County, Virginia Colony, British America
- Died: April 25, 1848 (aged 75) "Mountain Hall," Nottoway County, Virginia, U.S.
- Party: Democratic
- Spouse: Catherine Harris
- Education: Hampden–Sydney College

Military service
- Allegiance: United States of America
- Branch/service: Virginia militia
- Years of service: 1812–16

James Jones (December 11, 1772 – April 25, 1848) was a medical doctor, planter and politician who also served as an officer in the War of 1812. Jones served several terms in the Virginia House of Delegates representing Nottoway County as well as U.S. Representative from Virginia's 19th congressional district.

== Early life ==
Born to the former Mary Epes and her planter husband Richard Jones (Jr.) (d. 1817) in Nottoway Parish then in Amelia County in the Colony of Virginia. Nottoway County was created during this man's childhood due to increasing population, and the farm on which he grew up and later inherited was part of the new county. His great-grandfather Richard Jones was one of the first two men to represent Amelia County in the House of Burgesses after its formation in 1735. His grandfather (also) Richard Jones died in 1778 during the American Revolutionary War (also during this boy's childhood), but his father would not die until 1817, after this man reached legal age. This Jones family, of Welsh ancestry, descended from three generations of traders named Peter Jones (whose trading post became the foundation for Petersburg considerably downstream on the Appomattox River, but the last Peter Jones moved to the then-frontier Amelia County where he died). His uncle Col. John Jones of Amelia County was prominent in that conflict as was this man's father, Major Richard Jones. In any event, young James Jones was born in comfortable economic circumstances and received an education appropriate for his class, then graduated from Hampden–Sydney College in 1791. He had studied medicine with Dr. Joe Mettaur of nearby Prince Edward County, then traveled north to Baltimore, Maryland to study with Dr. George Brown, and then continued to Philadelphia, Pennsylvania for medical education at the Jefferson Medical College in December 1793. Finally, Jones traveled to Europe and earned a degree in medicine from the University of Edinburgh Medical School in Scotland in June 1796.

== Career ==
Upon returning to Amelia County in November 1796, Dr. Jones practiced medicine and also helped his father operate plantations using enslaved labor, as had his grandfather and great-grandfather. He built a plantation house in the Georgian style which is now a National Historic Landmark. In 1820, the first census after his father's death, Jones owned 30 enslaved people in Nottoway County. In the last federal census of his life, Jones owned 56 enslaved people in Nottoway County. He supported education (serving on the Hampden-Sydney Board of Trustees for decades), opposed high tariffs and in 1822 was president of Nottoway's agricultural society when he wrote a paper published in the American Farmer. In his will, he manumitted all his slaves and advised them to move to Liberia.

Meanwhile, Nottoway County voters elected Jones as one of their representatives (part-time) in the Virginia House of Delegates in 1804, and re-elected him annually until 1809. Thus he served first alongside veteran Tyree G. Bacon, then twice alongside Griffin Lamkin, and twice alongside John Fitzgerald. Then from 1809 until he resigned in 1811, Jones served on the Virginia Governor's Council. During the War of 1812, Jones initially served as surgeon of the local militia led by his brother Capt. Richard Jones, but was promoted to become director general of hospital and medical stores.

Jones failed to win election to the Fifteenth Congress to fill the vacancy caused by the death of Peterson Goodwyn, but two years later was elected as a Democratic-Republican to the Sixteenth and re-elected to the Seventeenth Congresses (March 4, 1819 – March 3, 1823). He announced his retirement following the redistricting caused by the 1820 census, and was succeeded by Congressman William McCoy of Pendleton County far to the west.

Upon leaving Congress, Jones resumed farming and his educational advocacy. Nottoway County voters again elected Jones to the Virginia House of Delegates in 1827 and re-elected him once, before replacing both him and veteran legislator Hezekiah Anderson in late 1829. Anderson owned and adjacent plantation, as well as worked with Capt. Richard Jones, as president of the Bellefonte Jockey Club. In 1825, Virginia's legislature had allowed incorporation of a company to create a canal to make Deep Creek navigable from Nottoway County until its drainage into the Appomattox River, allowing stock valued at $8300. Jones and his probable relative Robert Jones were among the 14 landowners who signed a right-of-way and release of damage claims to the Deep Creek Company.

== Personal life ==
Jones had become a free thinker during his time in Scotland, and joined a local Amelia County philosophic society and debating group that called themselves the "Tom Paine Infidel Club." (Paineville, Virginia, named for that same freethinker is in western Amelia County near at least one of the Jones family plantations) He had two daughters, one dying in 1799 and the other in 1810 (aged 11). When the second daughter died, Jones first sought comfort from that philosophy, but about 1810 assembled the club and gave a speech extolling Christianity, which soon thereafter led to the club's disbandment. He then became an elder in the Presbyterian Church, and facilitated a great moral reformation in Southside Virginia in 1825. He also was one of ten physicians who petitioned the legislature to create a "Jefferson College," and in 1817 was elected an honorary member of the Philadelphia Medical Society.

Jones married Catherine Harris of Surry County, whose sister married Mr. Campbell who owned "Blendon" plantation in Nottoway County. Another sister married Mr. Fletcher of "Somerset" plantation.

== Death and legacy ==
Jones was opposed to slavery (as finally would be his Amelia and Charlotte county neighbor Congressman John Randolph) and in his will set free all his slaves, advising them to settle in Liberia. Jones died at his home, "Mountain Hall," near Nottoway, Virginia on April 25, 1848. He was interred there in the family burying ground, and his widow carried out his request before her death in 1860. Mountain Hall was purchased after the conflict by CSA Col. Calvin Jeffress (who would be buried in what had been the Jones graveyard), and listed on the National Register of Historic Places in 2002. A portrait is displayed at the Nottoway library.

== Sources ==
- United States Congress. "James Jones (id: J000228)". Biographical Directory of the United States Congress.

U.S. House of Representatives
Preceded by John Pegram	Member of the U.S. House of Representatives from Virginia's 19th congressional district March 4, 1819 – March 3, 1823 (obsolete district)	Succeeded by William McCoy
