= William Porcher Miles =

American politician (1822–1899)

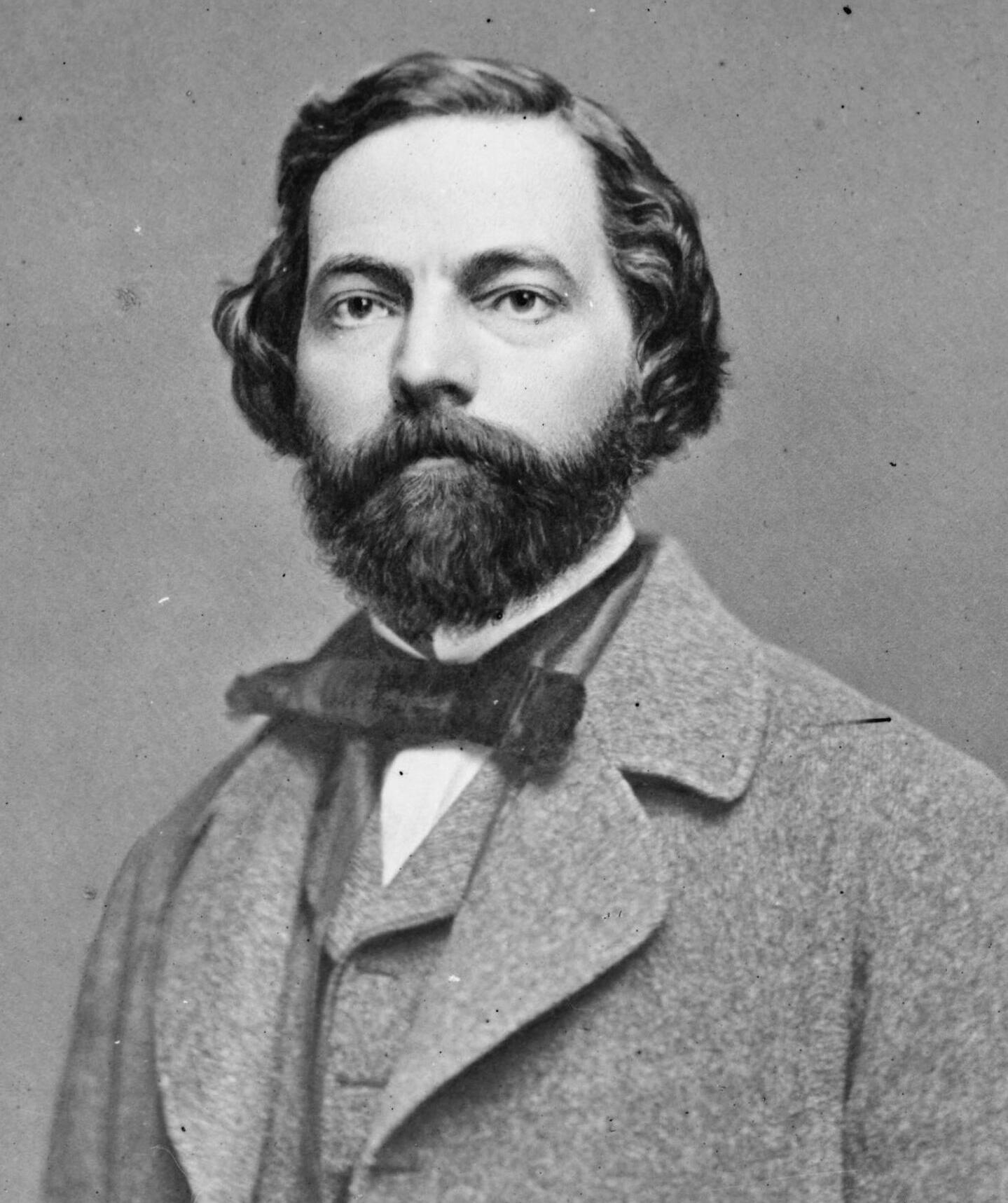

Member of the C.S. House of Representatives from South Carolina's 2nd district
- In office February 18, 1862 – March 18, 1865
- Preceded by: New constituency
- Succeeded by: Constituency abolished

Deputy from South Carolina to the Provisional Congress of the Confederate States
- In office February 4, 1861 – February 17, 1862
- Preceded by: New constituency
- Succeeded by: Constituency abolished

Member of the U.S. House of Representatives from South Carolina's 2nd district
- In office March 4, 1857 – December 24, 1860
- Preceded by: William Aiken
- Succeeded by: Christopher Bowen

36th Mayor of Charleston
- In office November 7, 1855 – November 4, 1857
- Preceded by: Thomas Leger Hutchinson
- Succeeded by: Charles Macbeth

Personal details
- Born: July 4, 1822 Walterboro, South Carolina
- Died: May 11, 1899 (aged 76) Ascension Parish, Louisiana
- Resting place: Green Hill Cemetery, Union, West Virginia
- Party: Democratic
- Spouse: Betty Beirne (m. 1863)
- Education: Charleston College

Military service
- Allegiance: Confederate States
- Branch/service: Confederate States Army
- Years of service: 1861
- Rank: Colonel
- Battles/wars: American Civil War

William Porcher Miles (July 4, 1822 – May 11, 1899) was an American politician who was among the ardent states' rights advocates, supporters of slavery, and Southern secessionists who came to be known as the "Fire-Eaters." He is notable for having designed the most popular variant of the Confederate flag, originally rejected as the national flag in 1861 but adopted as a battle flag by the Army of Northern Virginia under General Robert E. Lee before it was reincorporated.

Born in South Carolina, he showed little early interest in politics, and his early career included the study of law and a tenure as a mathematics professor at the Charleston College from 1843 to 1855. In the late 1840s, as sectional issues roiled South Carolina politics, Miles began to speak up on sectional issues. He opposed both the Wilmot Proviso and the Compromise of 1850. From then on, Miles would look at any northern efforts to restrict slavery as justification for secession.

Miles was elected as mayor of Charleston in 1855 and served in the United States House of Representatives from 1857 until South Carolina seceded, in December 1860. He was a member of the state secession convention and a representative from South Carolina at the Confederate Convention in Montgomery, Alabama, which established the provisional government and constitution for the Confederate States. He represented his state in the Confederate House of Representatives during the American Civil War.

== Early life ==
Miles was born in Walterboro, South Carolina, to James Saunders Miles and Sarah Bond Worley Miles. His ancestors were French Huguenots and his grandfather, Major Felix Warley, fought in the American Revolution. His primary education came at Southworth School and he later attended Willington Academy where John C. Calhoun had matriculated a generation earlier. Miles enrolled at Charleston College in 1838 where he met future secession advocates James De Bow and William Henry Trescot. Miles graduated in 1842 and in 1843 he briefly studied law with a local attorney before returning to his alma mater as a mathematics professor.

Throughout the 1840s Miles showed little interest in active politics. He did not participate in the Bluffton Movement in 1844, although he did recognize that the 1846 Wilmot Proviso threatened his concepts of "southern rights, the equality of the states under the Constitution, and the honor of a slaveholding people." In 1849 Miles was invited to speak at a Fourth of July celebration in Charleston.

In this speech, Miles attacked the principles behind the Wilmot Proviso. While he believed that slavery was a "Divine institution," he was willing to accept differences of opinion as long as antislavery advocates returned the favor by admitting that slavery was "recognized and countenanced" by the Constitution. To Miles, Northerners, in their efforts to legislate restrictions on slavery, were not simply raising an issue of constitutional interpretation. Miles argued:

They are not contending for an abstract principle – they are not influenced by a mere spirit of fanatical opposition to slavery ... they are deliberately, intentionally, and advisedly aiming a deadly blow at the South. It is intended as a blow. It is intended to repress her energies – to check her development – to diminish and eventually destroy her political weight and influence in this confederacy.

Miles rejected any compromise on slavery and supported Calhoun in opposition to the Compromise of 1850. However while activists within the state in 1850 and 1851 mobilized, Miles remained on the sidelines as Southern Rights associations and rallies dominated South Carolina politics. In 1852 Miles delivered an address to the Alumni Society of the Charleston College that included one of the frequent arguments of the Fire-Eaters. Addressing himself to the Declaration of Independence, Miles denied the concept of inalienable rights and maintained that liberty was an "Acquired Privilege." He argued that "Men are born neither Free nor Equal" and some men were born with the innate ability to earn liberty while others were not. Government should not attempt to either "make a Statesman of him who God intended should be a Ploughman" or "bind down forever to the plough him to whom God has given a mind capable of shaping the destinies of a People." From this point on in his career, Miles rejected the political legitimacy of abolitionists and free-soilers and responded to any attempts to restrict slavery with a call for secession. In 1852 he delivered "Republican Government Not Always the Best" to members of College of Charleston graduation address.

== Mayor of Charleston ==
In the summer of 1855 a yellow fever epidemic hit the coast of Virginia. Eventually 2,000 people would die as well as half of the doctors who attempted to treat it. Virginia called for volunteers from the lower South where the disease was more common and residents had developed some natural immunity. Miles responded by serving for several weeks in Norfolk as a nurse. His heroic activities were reported back to Charleston, and his friends used the popularity generated by his activities to draft him as a candidate for mayor. Upon his return to Charleston he made only one public speech but was still elected mayor by a vote of 1,260 to 837. While serving as mayor, Miles lived at 53 Beaufain Street; the house no longer exists.

Interested in reform, the new mayor first tackled police reform. After sending out fact finding missions to other cities, he implemented a plan that addressed the problem of excessive partisanship within the city council. Appointment responsibility was reassigned to the police chief for lower ranks and to the mayor, with city council approval, for higher ranks. He expanded the size of the City Guard and created a mounted police force.

In the area of social reform, Miles created a house of corrections for juveniles, an almshouse, an orphanage and an asylum. He provided aid for transient poor and free black paupers and implemented a sewage system as a health measure. Having inherited a large public debt, he increased property taxes in an effort to retire the debt in 35 years. At the end of his two-year term he was widely judged to have been successful, leading him to consider further public office.

== United States House of Representatives ==
In 1856 Miles ran for the seat being vacated by Congressman William Aiken Jr. The national issues of slavery in Kansas and the rise of the Republican Party dominated the election. Miles argued that the election of the Republican candidate for president, John C. Fremont, would require a joint southern response that could include boycotting the new Congress and calling a southern convention to determine further action. In a three-way election Miles was victorious by a vote of 1,852 to 1,844 for his two opponents.

When he took office in 1857 he found that the Kansas issues dominated Congressional debate, threatened the unity of the Democratic Party and increased the growth of the Republicans. His first speech on the House floor came in 1858 and argued the Southern position on Kansas. Despite his acknowledgement that the Kansas climate was not conducive to slavery, he stated:

But, sir, the issue has been made, the battle joined; and though it be on an abstract principle which does not at present promise to result in any practical advantage to us, I am willing to stand by the guns and fight it out. ... The South may not dissolve the Union on the rejection of Kansas, but such rejection would, assuredly, sever still another of the cords – rapidly becoming fewer – which the course of events has been snapping one by one.

Miles was re-elected in 1858. In January 1859 he spoke in support of fellow fire-eater William Lowndes Yancey in advocating the repeal of federal laws banning the African slave trade. Miles felt that the regulation of the trade should be a state function and that the national ban was an insult to Southern honor. This stance was considered too radical even by his friends, such as Trescott, who felt, since it could never be supported by the majority of the nation, that Miles' stance was simply a guise to force disunion.

John Brown's raid on Harpers Ferry sent a shock wave across the South. When the Thirty-sixth Congress met in December 1859 the first order of business was the selection of a speaker. Already in turmoil over the Brown raid, Southerners were further aggravated by the nomination of Ohio Republican John Sherman for the post. Sherman was one of 68 Republicans who had endorsed Hinton Helper's book, The Impending Crisis and How to Meet It, which Southerners believed would ignite class warfare between slaveholders and non-slaveholders in the South. Republicans proposed buying 100,000 copies of the book and distributing it throughout the country. Miles conspired with South Carolina's governor to send a regiment of militia to Washington to break up the Congress in the event of Sherman's election, but the withdrawal of Sherman's nomination prevented action.

In South Carolina the state legislature was unable to determine an appropriate response, but finally, reacting to a proposal by pro-secession Governor William Henry Gist decided to propose a Southern convention. As a first step Christopher Memminger was dispatched to Virginia in order to solicit their support. Miles advised Memminger to "urge our Carolina view in such a manner as to imbue Virginia with it ... [and] we may soon hope to see the fruit of your addresses in the sturdy and healthy offspring of whose birth we would be so greatly proud — a Southern confederacy.

== South Carolina Secession ==
=== Election of 1860 ===
By 1860 Miles was one of the leading secessionists in South Carolina. His position in Washington, D.C., allowed him to serve as a conduit in the flow of information between Washington and Charleston. State politicians focused on the upcoming Democratic Convention scheduled in Charleston beginning on April 23. Miles was concerned about the candidacy of Stephen A. Douglas, especially rumors that there might even be a pro-Douglas faction in South Carolina. Miles and other radicals were convinced that only a strictly Southern party could properly address the state's needs.

The convention deadlocked over the party platform. Southerners opposed Douglas' support for popular sovereignty – a concept which would have allowed new territories to decide for themselves whether or not to allow slavery. Southerners preferred federal guarantees that slavery would be allowed in all United States territories. Thirteen of the 16 South Carolina delegates walked out of the convention. In May Miles returned to Charleston and declared that the next election would pit "power against principle – the majority against the minority, regardless of all constitutional barriers."

Support for secession was strong in South Carolina even before Lincoln's election. Miles pressed the issue, urging action as opposed to simply more discussion. Miles stated, according to a July 24 newspaper account:

I am chary of seeing the South pass "resolutions". They accomplish nothing. In truth, have come to be regarded very much like the cry of "wolf". Let us resolve less and do more. I am sick at heart of the endless talk and bluster of the South. If we are in earnest let us act. Above all, I am weary of these eternal attempts to hold out the olive branch, when we ought to be preparing to grasp the sword.

Miles argued that South Carolina should "break up things generally, which any state can at any time do." He believed that the South had "all the elements of wealth, prosperity and strength, to make her a first-class power among the nations of the world" and would "lose so little and gain so much" with secession." In August Miles was struck with typhoid fever and went to New England to recover, not returning to the state until the November elections.

=== Secession winter ===
As secession loomed, President James Buchanan was concerned about the safety of United States property in South Carolina. Miles, returning to Washington for the upcoming session of Congress, was one of the South Carolina delegates who met with Buchanan to discuss this problem. On December 10 Miles and the others presented a letter to the President that assured him that the forts in Charleston would not be molested "provided that no reinforcement should be sent into those forts, and their relative military status" maintained. Buchanan questioned the word "provided" since it appeared to bind him, but the delegates assured him that they were only communicating their understanding based on the status quo. According to both Miles and fellow South Carolina fire-eater Laurence M. Keitt, Buchanan said, "After all, this is a matter of honor among gentlemen. I do not know that any paper or writing is necessary. We understand each other."

Returning to South Carolina, Miles was elected as a delegate to the South Carolina secession convention. Miles was for immediate action. On December 17, fearing that even a few days of delay could be critical, he opposed the relocation of the convention from Columbia to Charleston due to a smallpox outbreak. Miles' last communications with southerners in Washington told him that they were all looking to South Carolina for leadership. Miles attitude was reflected in his statement, "Let us act if we mean to act without talking. Let it be 'a word and a blow – but the blow first."

The convention adopted an ordinance of secession on December 20. Miles, along with other South Carolinians, immediately resigned his seat in Congress. In the months ahead, Miles, believing in the possibility of peaceful secession, opposed precipitate action over either Fort Sumter or the Star of the West incident. In February 1861 Miles was one of eight South Carolina delegates to the Confederate Convention in Montgomery, Alabama, that established the Confederacy.

== Confederate States Congress ==
Miles was selected for both the provisional and regular Confederate Congress. He was chairman of the House Military Affairs Committee while also serving as an aide-de-camp for General P. G. T. Beauregard at both Charleston, in the buildup to the attack on Fort Sumter, and the First Battle of Bull Run. Recognizing, however, his own lack of military training, Miles focused most of his attention on his congressional duties.

Historian Eric H. Walther describes Miles tenure in the Confederate Congress:

Like other fire-eaters, Miles found only frustration in the Confederate Congress. Before secession he had wanted to eliminate all trade duities in a southern confederacy. Now, De Bow warned him that a sudden shift to free trade would alienate and antagonize the powerful sugar planters of the Gulf South, who had prospered under the tariff policies of the Union. Miles complained that his colleagues on congressional committees made work impossible because their habitual absences prevented a quorum, and as events began to sour in the new nation he held no higher opinion of President Davis than other fire-eaters. Late in the war, when some military officials began to discuss the efficacy of using black troops in the Confederate army, Miles was perplexed. ... [H]e understood the urgent demands of the army, but eventually ... [concluded] that "it is not merely a military, but a great social and political question, and the more I consider it the less is my judgment satisfied that it could really help our cause to put arms into the hands of our slaves.

While serving in the Confederate Provisional Congress, Miles chaired the "Committee on the Flag and Seal," which adopted the "Stars and Bars" flag as the national flag of the Confederacy. Miles opposed this selection because, he felt, it too much resembled, as supporters of it admitted, the old Stars and Stripes. Miles argued:

Miles' rejected flag proposal, ancestor to the Battle Flag

There is no propriety in retaining the ensign of a government which, in the opinion of the States composing this Confederacy, had become so oppressive and injurious to their interests as to require their separation from it. It is idle to talk of "keeping" the flag of the United States when we have voluntarily seceded from them.

Miles favored his own design. When General P.G.T. Beauregard decided a more recognizable Battle Flag was needed, Miles' suggested his design. Although this design had been rejected by the committee for a national flag, it eventually became the Confederate Battle Flag, today often referred to as a "Rebel flag" or the "Southern Cross." Miles' design was later used as the canton in the second version of the national flag (nicknamed the "Stainless Banner") as well as in the third national design (nicknamed the "Blood-Stained Banner").

== Later life ==
As late as January 1865, Miles offered a resolution in the Confederate Congress stating, "That we, the representatives of the people of the Confederate States, are firmly determined to continue the struggle in which we are involved until the United States shall acknowledge our independence."

Describing Miles's feelings shortly after the war ended and quoting from a September 25, 1865, letter, Walther wrote:

And yet even the realities of defeat did not change Miles' abstract ideas. Watching how other southerners dealt with defeat greatly upset the highly principled Miles. "When we see the most ardent Secessionists and 'Fire eaters' now eagerly denying that they ever did more than 'yield their convictions to the voice of their State,'" and call secession a heresy and slavery a curse, Miles concluded, "it is plain that Politics must be more a trade and less a pursuit for an honourable man than it ever was before." For any secessionist to return to public office in a reconstructed Union, Miles believed, entailed a forfeiture of self-respect, consistency, and honor. For himself and other secessionists, he said, politics "for a time cannot be a path which any high-toned and sensitive – not to say honest and conscientious – can possibly tread."

Miles had married Bettie Beirne in 1863, the daughter of a wealthy Virginia planter, Oliver Beirne, and granddaughter of Representative Andrew Beirne. For a few years after the war, he worked for his father-in-law as a factor in New Orleans. In 1867, Miles took over the management of Oak Ridge Plantation in Nelson County, Virginia. He encountered serious financial problems as a tobacco and wheat farmer, and in 1874, he unsuccessfully applied for the position of president at the new Hopkins University of Baltimore. Miles remained on the farm and helped friends like Beauregard and former Fire-Eater Robert Rhett gather materials for their own histories of the Confederacy.

In 1880, Miles was appointed president of the newly-reopened South Carolina College. After his father-in-law's death in 1882, Miles took over the family business interests and relocated to Houmas House in Ascension Parish, Louisiana, where he managed a dozen plantations that Oliver Beirne had inherited just one year before at the death of his longtime friend, John Burnside. In 1892, with his son, he formed Miles Planting and Manufacturing Company of Louisiana.

Miles died on May 11, 1899, at 76 and was interred at Green Hill Cemetery in Union, West Virginia.

== Works cited ==
- Channing, Steven (1974). Crisis of Fear: Secession in South Carolina. W. W. Norton & Company. ISBN 0-393-00730-8.

Political offices
Preceded by Thomas Hutchinson	Mayor of Charleston; 1855–1857	Succeeded by Charles Macbeth
New constituency	Deputy from South Carolina to the Provisional Congress of the Confederate States; 1861–1862	Constituency abolished
U.S. House of Representatives
Preceded by William Aiken, Jr.	Member of the U.S. House of Representatives from South Carolina's 2nd congressional district 1857–1860	Succeeded by Christopher Bowen
Confederate States House of Representatives
New constituency	Member of the Confederate House of Representatives from South Carolina's 2nd congressional district 1862–1865	Constituency abolished
Academic offices
Preceded by Anson Cummings as Chairman of the Faculty	President of South Carolina College; 1880–1882	Succeeded by John McBryde
