= Richard Jones (burgess) =

Member of the Virginia House of Burgesses representing Amelia County
- In office 1736-1740 Serving with Edward Booker
- Preceded by: position created
- Succeeded by: Samuel Cobb

Personal details
- Born: 1691 Charles City County, Colony of Virginia
- Died: late 1758 Amelia County Colony of Virginia
- Occupation: planter, politician

Richard Jones (circa 1691 – 1758) was a planter who represented Amelia County in the House of Burgesses (1734-1736). The eldest of four generations of related men sharing the same name who held local or legislative offices in Amelia or later Nottoway County.

== Early life ==
Born circa 1688 or 1691 in the western part of Charles City County that became Prince George County in 1703. He was either a son or brother of Peter Jones (III), the third generation of traders of that name who founded Petersburg, then moved upstream on the Appomattox River to Amelia County where Peter Jones died in 1754. Peter Jones received land patents on the lower side of Deep Creek and Richard Jones on the upper side of Flatt Creek and south side of Buckskin Creek.

== Career ==
On September 28, 1728 Richard Jones (then of Prince George County) patented (claimed) 337 acres on the Bush River in what in 1754 became Prince Edward County. The following year, Charles Winston patented another 252 acres in the same area, and Edward Booker of Henrico County slightly to the west received a grant of 2050 acres on both sides of Knibbs Creek and another 950 acres in 1732. Also in 1732, Samuel Cobbs (who would become Amelia County's first Clerk of Court and this man's legislative successor) received a grant of 2120 acres between Knibbs and Flat creeks. Thus, development proceeded in what had been the frontier upstream on the Appomattox and south of the James River.

After Virginia's legislature established Amelia County in 1735, Edward and Richard Booker, as well as their relative James Clark and Abraham Green (all from the county's Namozine area), became the first justices of the peace for the new County (the justices jointly also administering counties in that era). Soon this man, Wood Jones, Samuel Cobbs and prominent merchant Thomas Tabb, as well as Henry Anderson, William Booker, John Dawson, Abraham Cocke, George Walker, William Clement, Hezekiah Ford and William Archer also became local justices of the peace in Amelia County.

In the first legislative election, Amelia County voters elected Jones and fellow planter Edward Booker as their (part-time) representatives in the House of Burgesses in the 1736–1740 term. However, unlike Edward Booker, Jones was not re-elected. However, the election of Joseph Scott was declared void, and in the resulting new election, Samuel Cobbs was elected to sit alongside Booker.

== Personal life ==
This Richard Jones married twice. His first wife Sarah Stratton (1688 or 1694 -1726), daughter of Edward and Martha Shippey Stratton bore three sons and two daughters who survived their father. Their included Richard (1718-1778), Peter (b. 1720-1799), Edward (1722-1759) and Daniel (1723-1772). Four of this man's daughters reached adulthood and married and received bequests in his will. They included two daughters by his first wife: Amy who had married Captain William Watson and after his death married Major Wood Jones (who would serve in the legislature); her sister Prudence Jones married Henry Ward. After his first wife's death, this Richard Jones remarried, to Margaret Goodrich. Their son Llewellyn Jones also survived his father, although Batte Jones died in 1758. Their daughter Rebecca married Rowland Ward; Martha married Peter Jones.

== Death and legacy ==
This Richard Jones died late in 1758 after writing his last will and testament, which was admitted to probate in Amelia County on December 16, 1758. His son Richard Jones (1718-1778) and grandson (later Major) Richard Jones (1747-1817) were sheriff and undersheriff of Amelia County in 1768, One of those men joined Edward Jones and Peter Jones Jr. among the 67 signers of an Oath of Allegiance to the Commonwealth and the United States on August 23, 1777. This man's grandson Major Richard Jones served in the American Revolutionary War as well as married three times. That man's son from his second marriage (this man's great grandson) Capt. Richard Jones (1794-1852) became a prominent local lawyer as well as led the county militia in the War of 1812 and served as Commonwealth Attorney as well in the Virginia House of Delegates. (Other relatives serving as Commonwealth attorney included John W. Jones before him and John Epes Jones considerably after him.) Three surviving plantation houses are associated with colonial men named Richard Jones: Bellefonte (which had a race course), Windrow and the Poplars. The first born son of Major Richard Jones (elder half brother of Capt. Richard Jones) Dr. James Jones became a prominent physician as well as politician who represented Nottoway County in the Virginia House of Delegates as well as served in the U.S. House of Representatives.
