= Sweet Springs Resort =

Coordinates: 37°37′44.51″N 80°14′28.17″W

- U.S. National Register of Historic Places
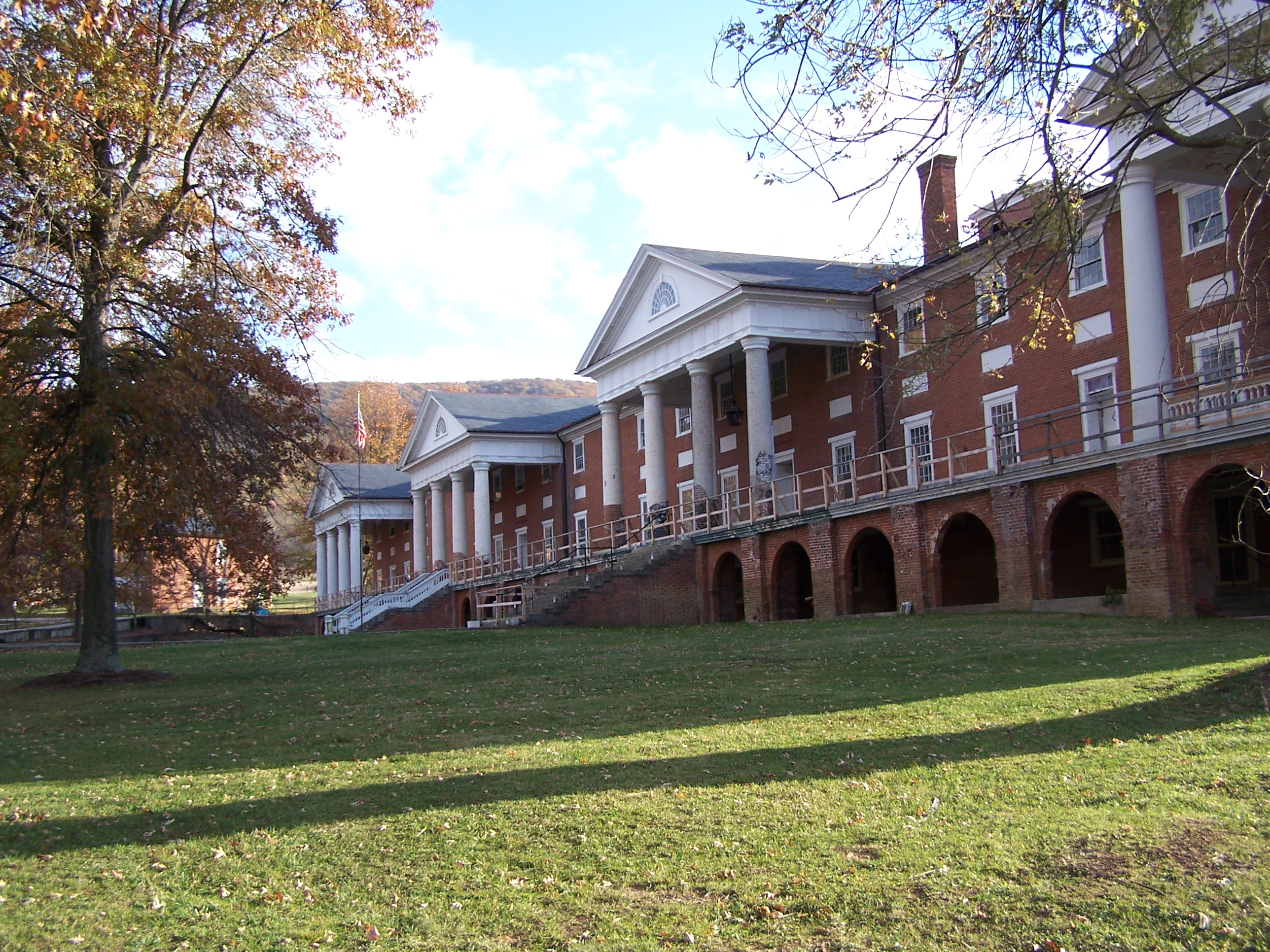
- Main building at Sweet Springs Resort, designed in the Thomas Jefferson style.

- Location within West Virginia Location within the United States
- Location: 19540 Sweet Springs Valley Rd, Sweet Springs, WV 24941
- Area: 8.5 acres (3.4 ha)
- Built: 1830
- NRHP reference No.: 70000659 Nomination for Old Sweet Springs
- Added to NRHP: January 26, 1970

Sweet Springs Resort and spa was founded in Sweet Springs, West Virginia, United States in 1792. Once known as Old Sweet Springs, this historic resort hotel is currently undergoing renovation by the nonprofit Sweet Springs Resort Park Foundation. The property enjoys notoriety for its natural hot spring.

== History ==
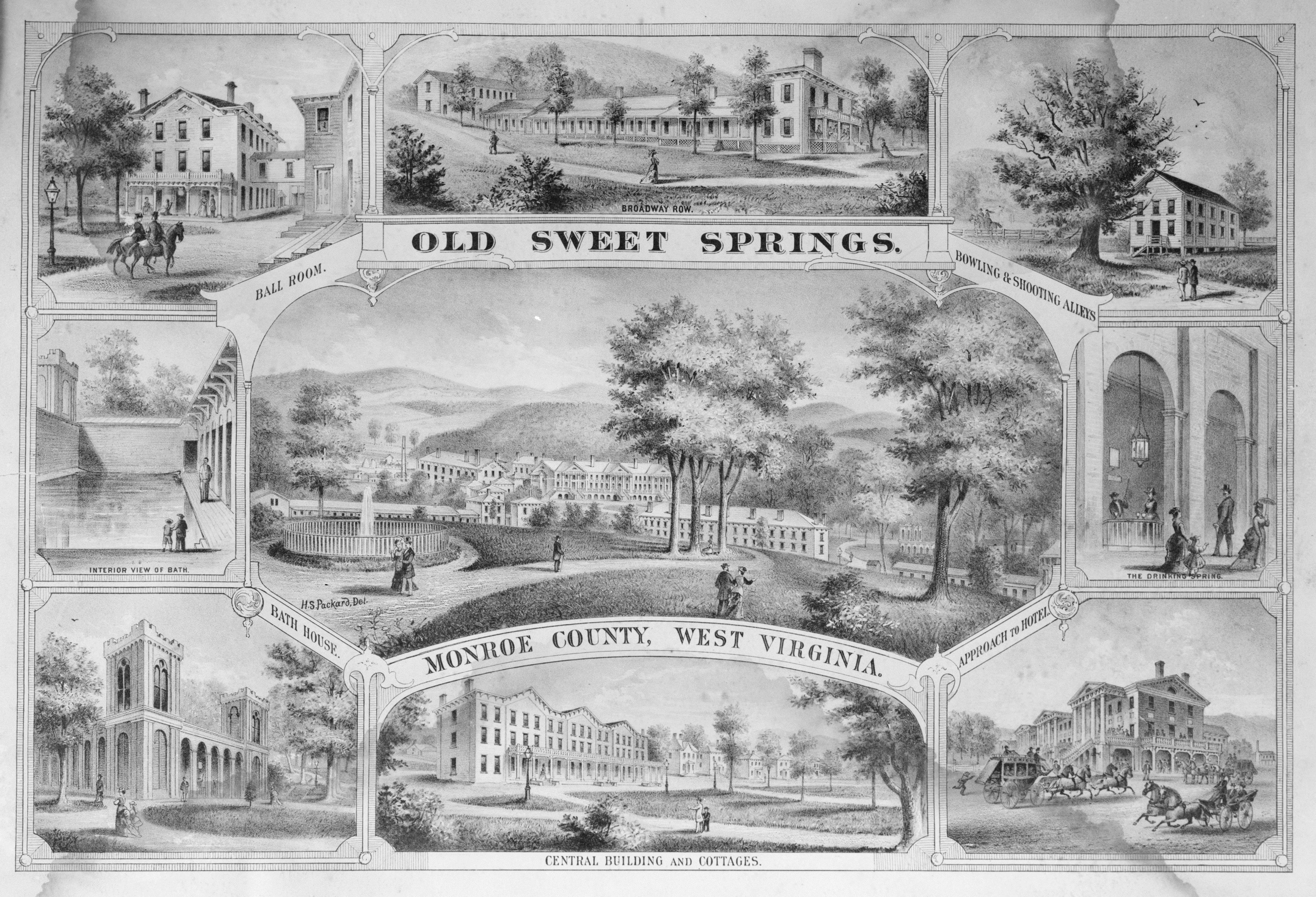
Engraving of Old Sweet Springs showing the various buildings and amenities at the resort.

Revolutionary War veteran William Lewis, a brother of General Andrew Lewis, was the first European settler to hold title to Sweet Springs, then a 1,200-acre tract patented in 1774. After the American Revolutionary War, Lewis undertook efforts to develop a town and resort at Sweet Springs. In 1790, the Virginia Assembly granted a charter for the creation of the town of "Fontville." The Virginia Circuit Court for Botetourt, Greenbrier, Kanawha, and Montgomery Counties sat in Sweet Springs for twelve years before the court was removed to Lewisburg. After its creation in 1799, the court of Monroe County also met in Sweet Springs before Union was named the county seat.

Just as Sweet Spring's prospects of becoming a major town and county seat vanished, the heyday of its resort industry arrived. In 1830, the original buildings at the spring were taken down and work commenced on a commodious brick hotel, designed in a classical style reminiscent of Thomas Jefferson's architecture (leading many to attribute the structure to him, though evidence suggests it was in fact designed by a protege of Jefferson). This building was completed by 1833 and soon thereafter, the Sweet Springs Company was formed in 1836 to manage the property. Among the many guests to stay at Sweet Springs since its establishment in the 1780s were George Washington, James Madison, Franklin Pierce, Martin Van Buren, Millard Fillmore, Marquis de Lafayette, and Robert E. Lee.

The Lewis family operated Sweet Springs for nearly seventy years, but by the mid-nineteenth century, the resort's business was in decline and it was sold to Allen Taylor Caperton and Oliver Beirne in 1852. Under new management, the resort was restored and new buildings added in 1857 including five cottages. The resort stayed in operation through the Civil War and enjoyed relative prosperity throughout the late-nineteenth century. The Lewis family regained ownership of Sweet Springs in 1902 and operated the resort until 1920, after which a series of owners attempted to revive the hotel for a decade before it went bankrupt in 1930. A significant factor that led to the gradual decline of Sweet Springs was lack of any railroad line near the resort. Nearby resorts such as White Sulphur Springs (better known as the Greenbrier) and Hot Springs thrived in this period with ready access to railroads.

After Sweet Springs ceased to operate as a resort, the buildings were purchased by the state of West Virginia in 1945 and rehabilitated for the Andrew S. Rowan Memorial Home for the aged. When the Rowan Home closed in 1991, efforts were made to convert the buildings into a drug addiction rehabilitation center, but these plans did not come to fruition. Two additional sales of the property have occurred since the mid-1990s and owners have attempted to revitalize the Sweet Springs Resort and to stabilize the historic buildings which were placed on the National Register of History Places in 1970.

== Current use ==
The property was sold at auction by Joe R. Pyle Complete Auction & Realty in 2015 and purchased by investor Ashby Berkley who also restored the former Pence Springs Hotel in Summers County, West Virginia. Berkley established a non-profit organization called the Sweet Springs Resort Park Foundation and has been restoring the property and possibly reopening it as a hotel.

== Selected images ==
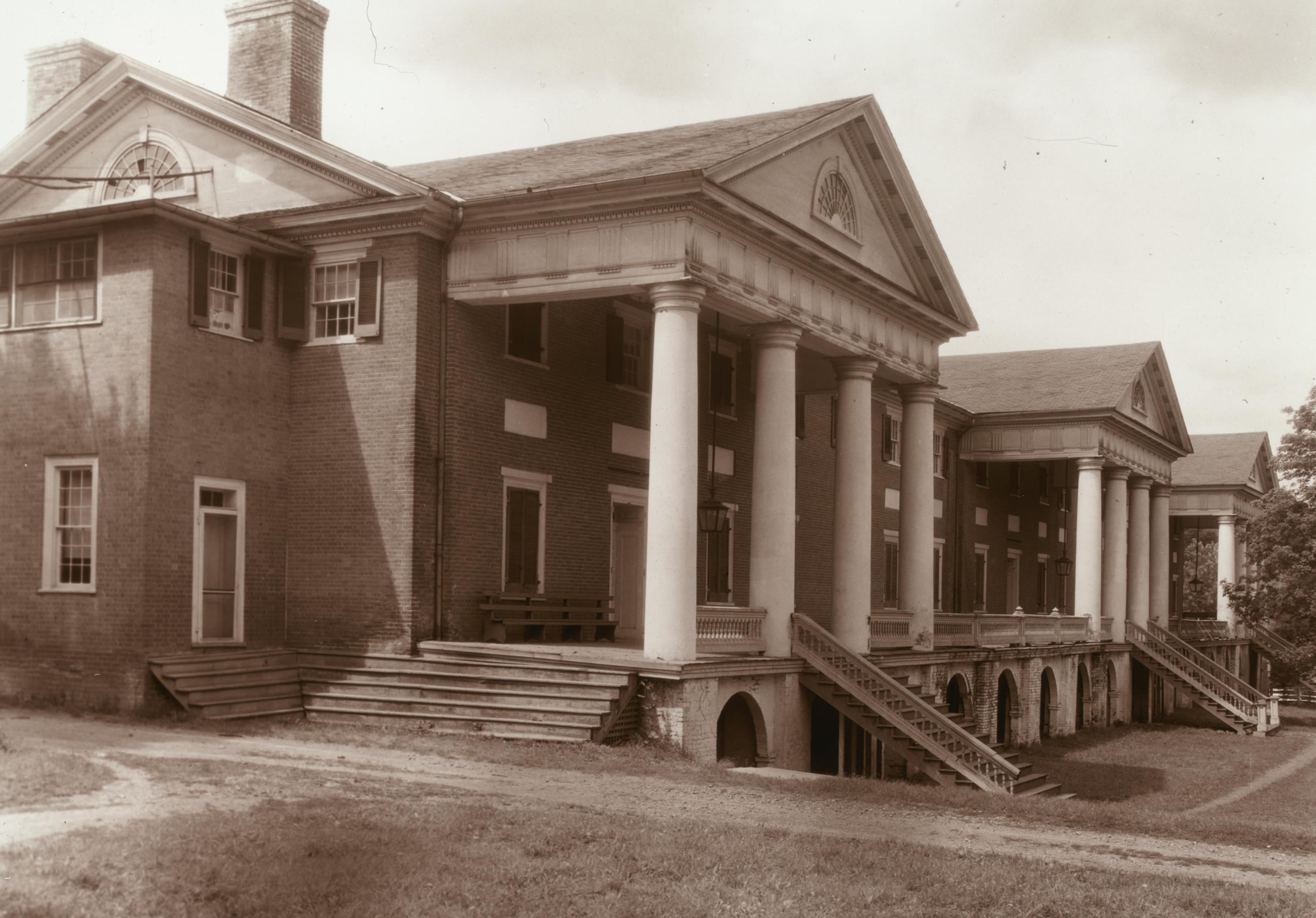

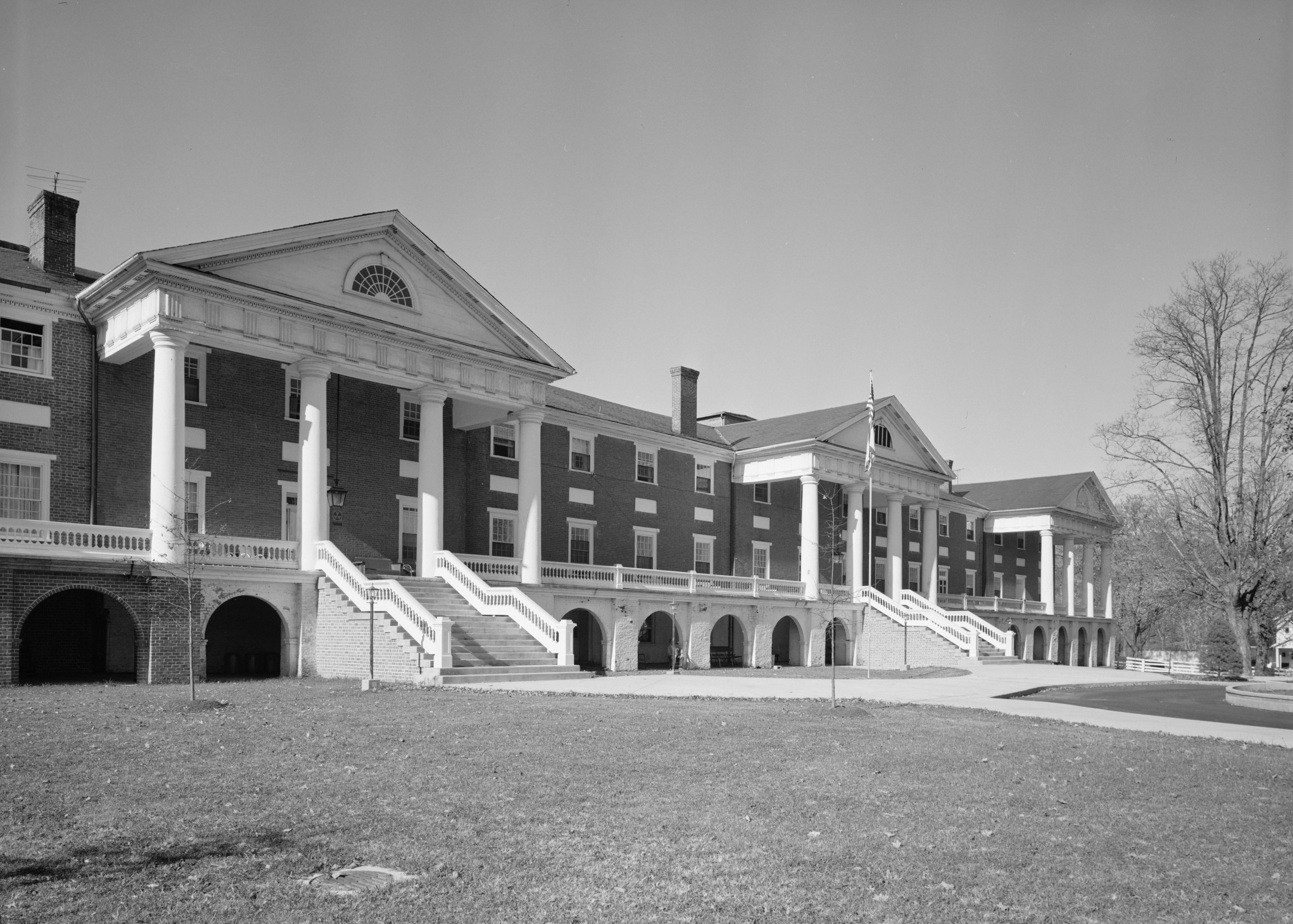

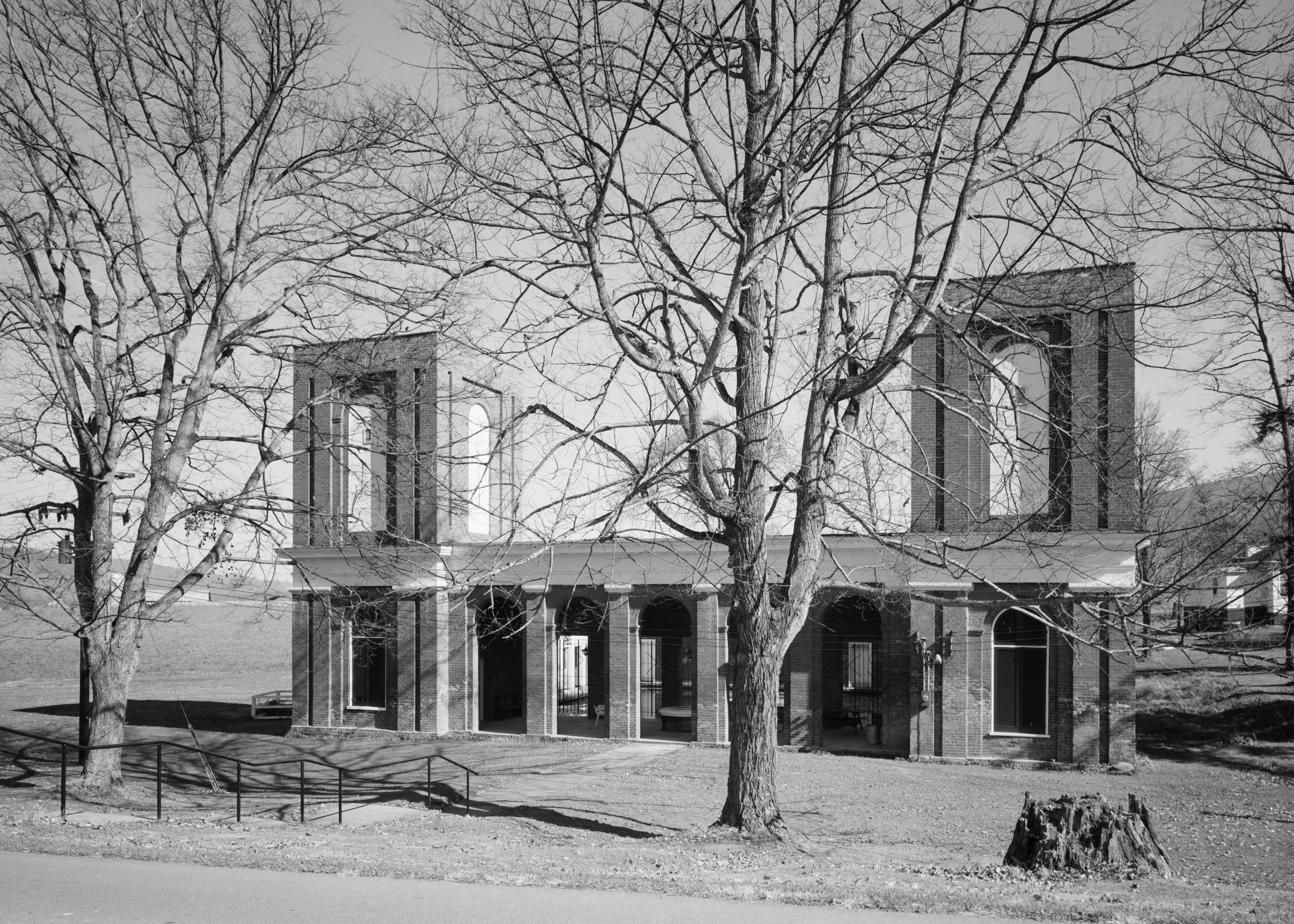

== See also ==
- Fontville, West Virginia
