= Mountain Hall =

Historic house in Virginia, United States

- U.S. National Register of Historic Places
- Virginia Landmarks Register
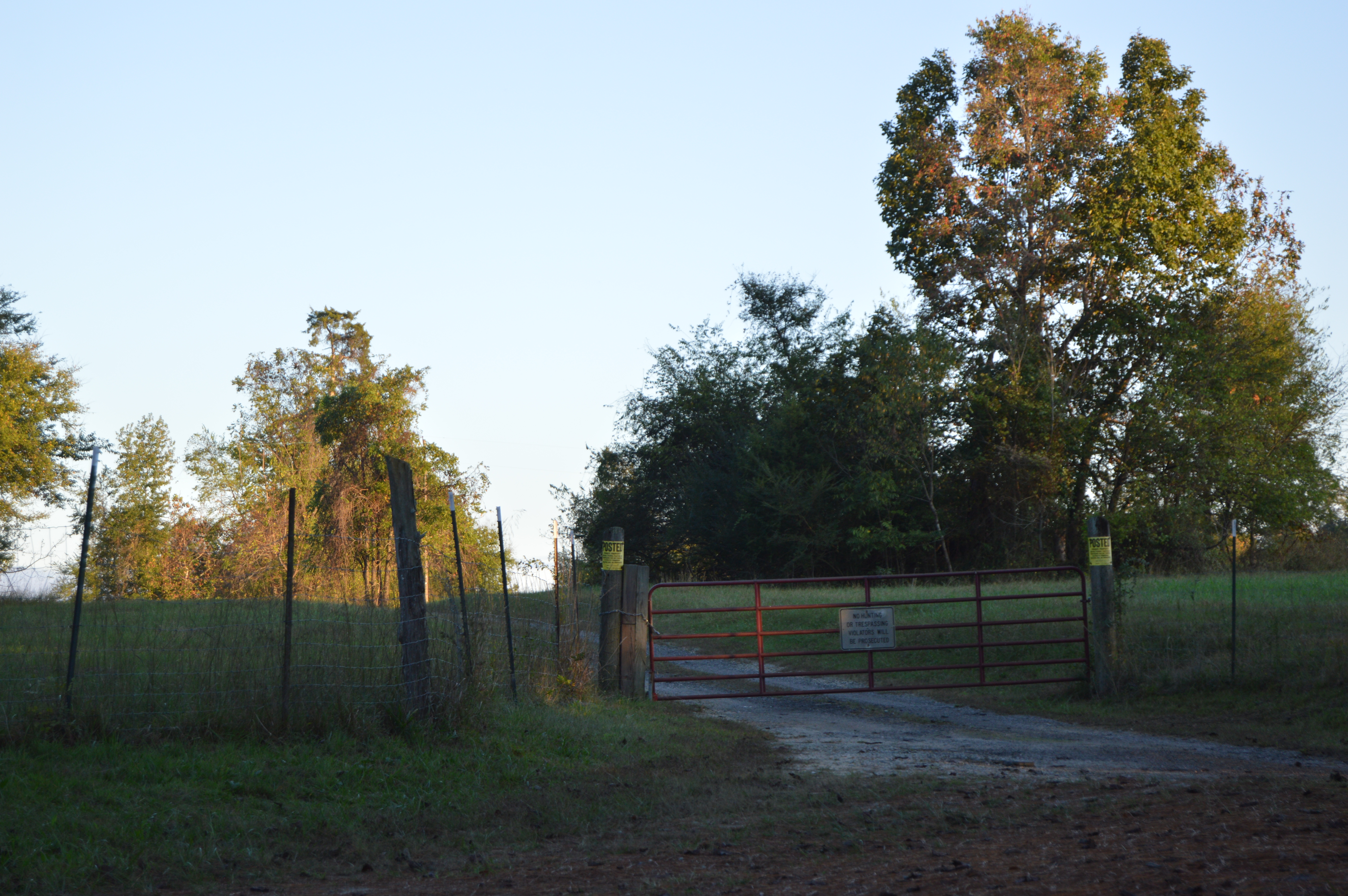
- Entrance to the property

- Location within Virginia Location within the United States
- Location: 181 Mountain Hall Dr., Crewe, Virginia
- Coordinates: 37°12′31″N 78°5′30″W
- Area: 24.5 acres (9.9 ha)
- Built: c. 1797
- Architectural style: Early Republic, Classical Revival
- NRHP reference No.: 02000184
- VLR No.: 067-0031

Significant dates
- Added to NRHP: March 13, 2002
- Designated VLR: December 5, 2001

Mountain Hall is a historic home and farm complex located near Crewe, Nottoway County, Virginia. The house was built about 1797, and is a two-story, three-bay, brick-and-frame, nearly square dwelling with a pyramidal roof. It has a side-hall plan and features four tall and narrow brick chimneys. Also on the property are a contributing L-shaped frame tenant house, two small cemeteries, and one additional grave. It was the home of physician and statesman Dr. James Jones (1772–1848), who died at Mountain Hall and is buried on the property.

It was listed on the National Register of Historic Places in 2002.
