= William McComas =

American politician

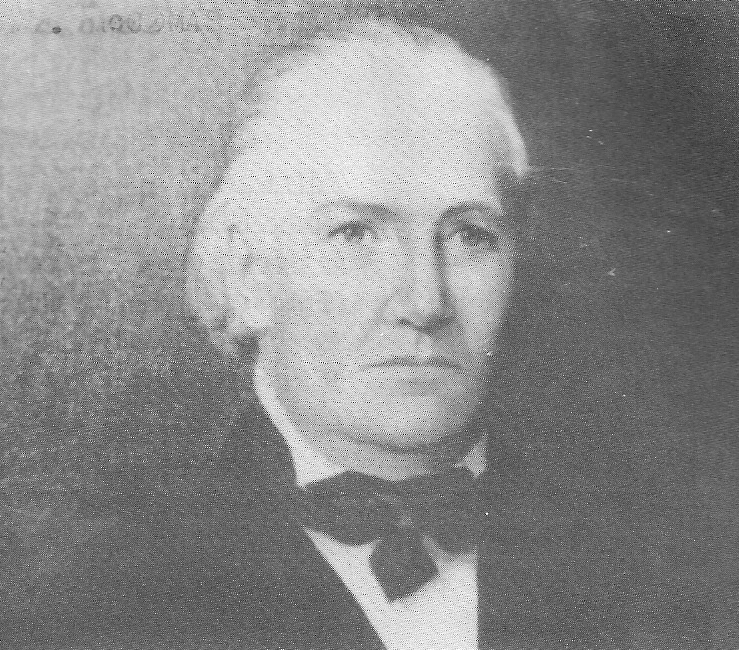

Member of the U.S. House of Representatives from Virginia's 19th district
- In office March 4, 1833 – March 3, 1837
- Preceded by: William McCoy
- Succeeded by: Andrew Beirne

Member of the Virginia Senate from the Cabell County district
- In office 1830–1833

Personal details
- Born: 1795 Pearisburg, Virginia, U.S.
- Died: June 3, 1865 (aged 69–70) Barboursville, West Virginia, U.S.
- Party: Jacksonian
- Spouse: Mildred Ward
- Profession: Politician, Minister, Lawyer, Judge

William McComas (1795 – June 3, 1865) was an American lawyer and politician who served in the Virginia Senate, United States House of Representatives and voted against secession in the Virginia Secession Convention of 1861. During the American Civil War, although some of his sons enlisted on opposing sides and West Virginia was created, he continued to serve as a federal judge in Union-held territory.

== Early and family life ==
Born near Pearisburg in Giles County, Virginia in 1795 to Elisha McComas (1770 - 1849) and his wife Ann French McComas (1776 - 1850), McComas was descended from long-established Virginia families who had helped fight in the American Revolutionary War. He had several brothers and sisters. McComas attended local private schools, then Emory and Henry College, in Emory, Virginia.

He married twice. His first wife, Mildred Ward McComas bore at least six sons and two daughters who survived to adulthood. After his first wife's death, he married Sarah V. Wentz Derton.

== Career ==
After graduating from college, McComas became Methodist minister, as well as read law and was admitted to the Virginia bar. He moved his young family westward in Virginia along the Midland Trail, establishing his own farm and legal practice in Cabell County near the confluence of the Mud and Guyandotte Rivers.

== Political career ==
McComas served one term as member of the Virginia state senate (a part-time position) in 1830–1833.

Elected as a Jacksonian to the Twenty-third Congress, McComas won re-election, but as an Anti-Jacksonian, to the Twenty-fourth Congress (March 4, 1833 – March 3, 1837). He then resumed his farming and legal career, and continued his ministry.

Although his former district had been eliminated after the post-1840 census redistricting, McComas again ran for Congress in 1848. He lost, and so did not attend the Thirty-first Congress.

His eldest son, Elisha W. McComas (1822-1890), who had served in the U.S. Army during the Mexican-American War, won election as Lieutenant Governor of Virginia in the following decade, but resigned because of how Governor John S. Wise handled the aftermath of John Brown's raid on Harper's Ferry. Elisha McComas then moved to Chicago, Illinois to continue his legal practice, then moved again to Kansas.

Meanwhile, as tensions grew concerning slavery, especially after the 1860 U. S. Presidential Election, Cabell County voters elected William McComas as one of their delegates to the Virginia Secession Convention of 1861. Although McComas consistently voted against the secession ordinance, it passed and was approved in a statewide referendum. Some northwestern Virginia delegates then held the Wheeling Convention to prevent secession and eventually established the Restored Government of Virginia and the new state.

However, McComas neither attended, nor participated in West Virginia's creation. His family divided. His second son, Dr. William Wirt McComas, who had enlisted in the Confederate artillery, died on April 19, 1862. On September 4, 1862, his third son, Hamilton Calhoun McComas (1831-1883, and another lawyer) enlisted in the Union Army in Illinois, and served for several months before resigning. His youngest son, Benjamin McComas (1836-1894), enlisted in the 30th Virginia Sharpshooters, a Confederate unit, but survived the war.

William McComas continued to serve as judge of the United States district court during the Civil War, residing in the portion which remained loyal to the Union (first as the Restored Government of Virginia and then the new state of West Virginia beginning in June 1863).

== Death and legacy ==
McComas died on his farm near Barboursville, Virginia (now West Virginia) on June 3, 1865.

U.S. House of Representatives
Preceded by William McCoy	Member of the U.S. House of Representatives from Virginia's 19th congressional district March 4, 1833 – March 3, 1837 (obsolete district)	Succeeded by Andrew Beirne
