= John Heath (Virginia politician) =

American politician (1758–1810)

Member of the Virginia Privy Council
- In office December 30, 1803 – October 13, 1810
- Governor: John Page; William H. Cabell; John Tyler, Sr.

Member of the U.S. House of Representatives from Virginia's 19th district
- In office March 4, 1793 – March 3, 1797
- Preceded by: Position established
- Succeeded by: Walter Jones

Member of the Virginia House of Delegates from Lancaster County
- In office 1784–1785
- In office 1782–1783

Personal details
- Born: May 8, 1758 Wicomico Parish, Northumberland County, Virginia, British Colony
- Died: October 13, 1810 (aged 52) Richmond, Virginia, US
- Party: Democratic-Republican (1795-onward); Anti-Administration (1793-1795)
- Education: College of William and Mary
- Occupation: lawyer, politician

John Heath (May 8, 1758 – October 13, 1810) was an American lawyer and politician from Northumberland County, Virginia. He represented Virginia in the U.S. House of Representatives from 1793 to 1797. He was also one of the founders of Phi Beta Kappa and served as the fraternity's first president.

== Early life ==
Heath was born in Wicomico Parish in Northumberland County, Virginia on May 8, 1758. His parents were Mary and John Heath Sr., a captain during the Indian War of 1755 and a member of the Virginia Colony's House of Burgesses.

His early education was provided by tutors. When he was seventeen in 1775, he attended the College of William & Mary. He was proficient in ancient languages and was selected by the faculty to deliver the Latin Oration. Heath was one of the four founders of the Phi Beta Kappa fraternity on December 6, 1776, and served as its first president through February 24, 1778. Phi Beta Kappa was the first Greek lettered organization to be established at an America college.

Heath graduated from William & Mary in 1778. In January 1779, he returned to the college to study law. He was also appointed to teach composition at the college from January 23, 1779 to June 5, 1779.

Heath served in the American Revolutionary War, enlisting sometime during the summer or fall of 1779 and serving until nearly the end of the war.

== Career ==
Heath practiced law in Northumberland County. In the March 1792 term, he was the attorney for 54 cases before the Northumberland County superior court, making him the most active attorney in the region.

He was appointed to fill a vacancy as the Commonwealth Attorney from September 10, 1781, to March 12, 1784, and again from November 15, 1787 to May 13, 1793. He was elected to represent Lancaster County in the Virginia House of Delegates in the fall of 1782 when he was 23 years old. His term was from 1782 to 1783. Heath declined reelection but was elected to a second term from 1784 to 1785.

Starting on March 4, 1793, Heath represented Virginia in the U.S. House of Representatives, 3rd Congress as an Anti-Administration party candidate. He served on the committee of claims. He was reelected as a Republican to the 4th Congress, serving through the end of his term on March 3, 1797.

Heath declined to run for reelection to Congress and returned to his law practice in Northumberland County.

In 1803, Governor John Page appointed Heath to the Virginia Privy Council; his term started on December 3, 1803. At the same time, he continued to practice law in state and federal courts. Page also served on the privy council under Governors William H. Cable and John Tyler Sr., serving until he died in October 1810.

== Personal life ==
Heath married Sally Ewell on December 3, 1785. She was the daughter of Col. James Ewell of the plantation, Greenville, in Prince William County, Virginia. The couple had four children: John Heath III, James Ewell Heath, Richard Seiden Heath, and Mary Heath.

Heath and his family lived in Wicomico Parish in Northhampton County. In 1791, he bought an estate that is a mile from what is now the town of Heathsville; he named the property Springfield and built a house. He sold Springfield and other properties in Northampton County and moved to Richmond in 1803 when he was appointed the state's privy council.

Heath died on October 13, 1810, in Richmond, Virginia.

== Honors ==
In 1796–1797, the Virginia House of Delegates incorporated the county seat of Northumberland County, they named it Heathsville in his honor.

U.S. House of Representatives
Preceded by Position established	Member of the U.S. House of Representatives from Virginia's 19th congressional district 1793 – 1797	Succeeded by Walter Jones
