= Andrew Beirne =

American politician

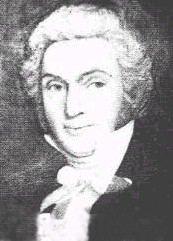
Andrew Beirne

Andrew Beirne (1771 – March 16, 1845) was an Irish immigrant who became a merchant, militia officer and politician in western Virginia, representing Monroe County in both houses of the Virginia General Assembly as well as the United States House of Representatives and the Virginia Constitutional Convention of 1829-1830.

== Early and family life ==
Beirne was born in Dangan, County Roscommon, Ireland, to Andrew Beirne, Dangan's Hereditary Chieftain, and Mary Plunkett Beirne, daughter of Edward Plunkett, 12th Baron Dunsany, the youngest of their five sons and a daughter. He received a classical education (possibly preparing for a career as a priest), and graduated from Trinity University in Dublin.

In Virginia, Beirne dropped the "O" from his surname and married Ellen Keenan, the daughter of Edward Keenan, who had likewise immigrated from Ireland. Of their ten children, five sons and four daughters reached adulthood.

== Career ==
Beirne immigrated to the United States in 1793 and settled in Philadelphia, Pennsylvania, investing his $150 savings in a business that failed. He then became a peddler, and about 1795 opened a store in Greenbrier County, Virginia on the farm of Edward Keenan, a fellow immigrant from Ireland, whose daughter he soon married (as discussed above). At about this time, two of his brothers emigrated to the United States and the three Beirnes formed a mercantile partnership, transporting merchandise from Philadelphia to Virginia, and accepting payment in ginseng, pelts, cattle or other goods. After the Virginia General Assembly created Monroe County from Greenbrier County, Beirne moved his store to the county seat, Union, and when the business flourished, openedn other stores in Virginia and the South, eventually acquiring 72 tracts of land (some presumably to repay customers' debts). He also established a 2,200 acre plantation, which he named "Walnut Grove" on the best land in Monroe County, somewhat north of Union.

Beirne at first aligned with the Jeffersonian Republican political party, and Monroe County voters elected him as their (part-time) representative in the Virginia House of Delegates in 1806 and re-elected him.

He also became a captain in the county militia, and during the War of 1812, that rifle company was ordered to Norfolk to protect the port and shipyard, but saw no action.. Beirne was delegate to the Virginia Constitutional Convention of 1829-1830 and member of the Virginia State Senate 1831-1836. He was elected as a Democrat to the Twenty-fifth and Twenty-sixth Congresses (March 4, 1837 – March 3, 1841). Beirne was not a candidate for reelection in 1840 to the Twenty-seventh Congress and resumed his former business activities.

Beirne died while on a visit in Gainesville, Sumter County, Alabama, March 16, 1845, with interment in the family burying ground at Union, Monroe County, Virginia.

His home at Union, known as "Walnut Grove," was listed on the National Register of Historic Places in 1977.

His son, Oliver Beirne, inherited The Houmas sugar plantation and another 9 plantations from John Burnside, a man that Andrew Beirne had helped became a successful businessman and that was considered part of the family (a legend said he was found as an infant by Andrew Beirne who raised him as a son) so that he is buried with the Beirnes at Green Hill Cemetery, Union.

U.S. House of Representatives
Preceded by William McComas	Member of the U.S. House of Representatives from Virginia's 19th congressional district March 4, 1837 – March 3, 1841 (obsolete district)	Succeeded by George W. Summers
