= Sweet Springs, West Virginia =

Sweet Springs
- Unincorporated community
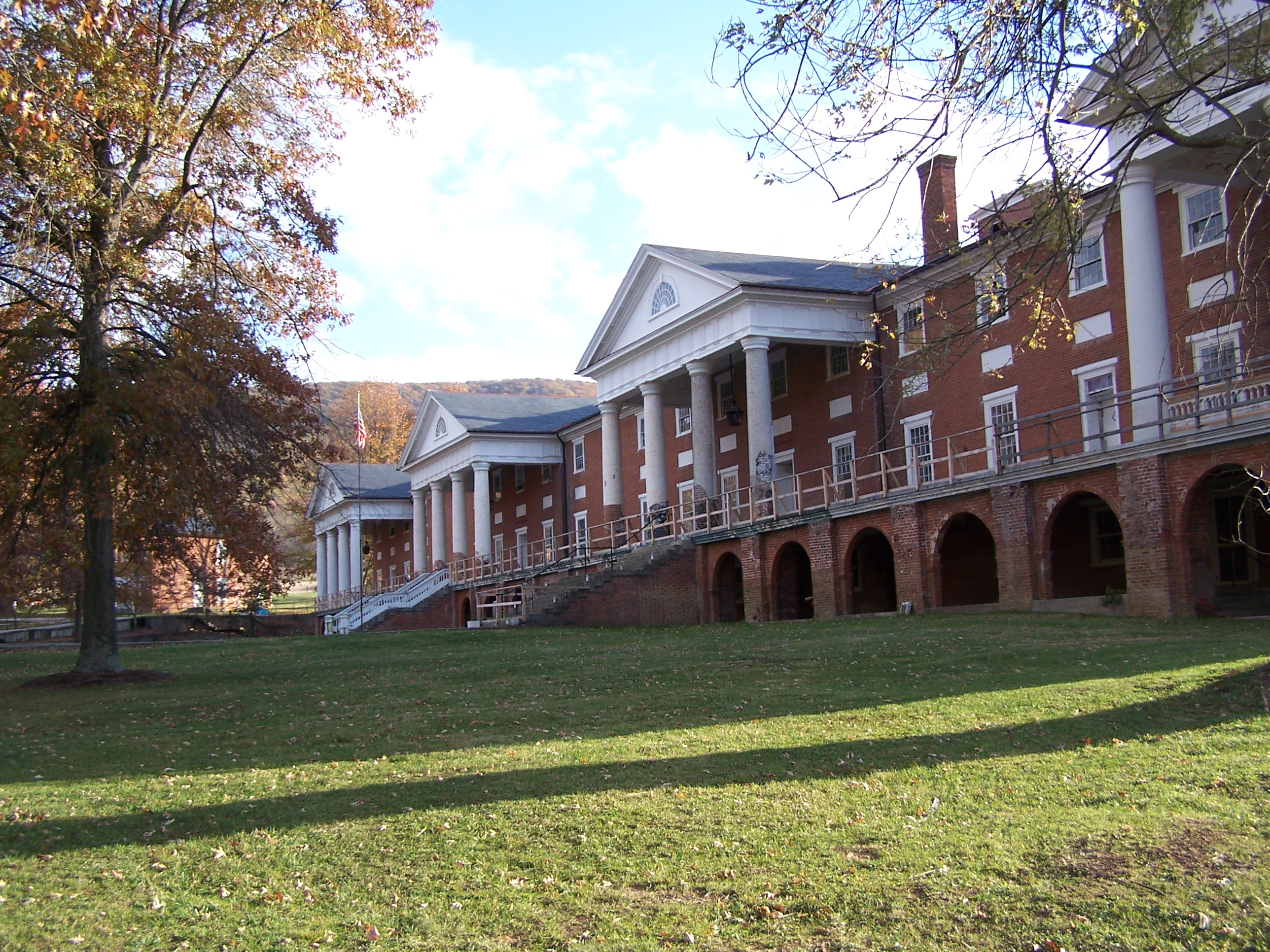
- Main building at Sweet Springs Resort, designed by Thomas Jefferson.

- Location within the state of West Virginia Sweet Springs (the United States)
- Coordinates: 37°37′42″N 80°14′29″W
- Country: United States
- State: West Virginia
- County: Monroe
- Elevation: 2,034 ft (620 m)
- Time zone: UTC-5 (Eastern (EST))
  - Summer (DST): UTC-4 (EDT)
- ZIP code: 24941
- Area codes: 304 & 681
- GNIS feature ID: 1553162

Sweet Springs is an unincorporated community in Monroe County in the U.S. state of West Virginia. Sweet Springs lies at the intersection of West Virginia Route 3 and West Virginia Route 311.

The community is known for its Sweet Springs Resort and spa, listed on the National Register of Historic Places. Its developer, William Lewis, attempted unsuccessfully to create a town named Fontville at the location in 1790. There was a Sweet Springs Post Office in the community from 1795 until 1997.
