= Samuel Blackburn =

Scottish artist

Samuel Blackburn (1813–1856) was an early 19th century Scottish portrait painter.

In 1844 he is listed as a "historical and portrait painter" living at 7 London Street in Edinburgh's New Town.

In later life he was based at a luxurious house at 29 Drummond Place in Edinburgh's New Town.

He is buried in Warriston Cemetery.

== Known works ==
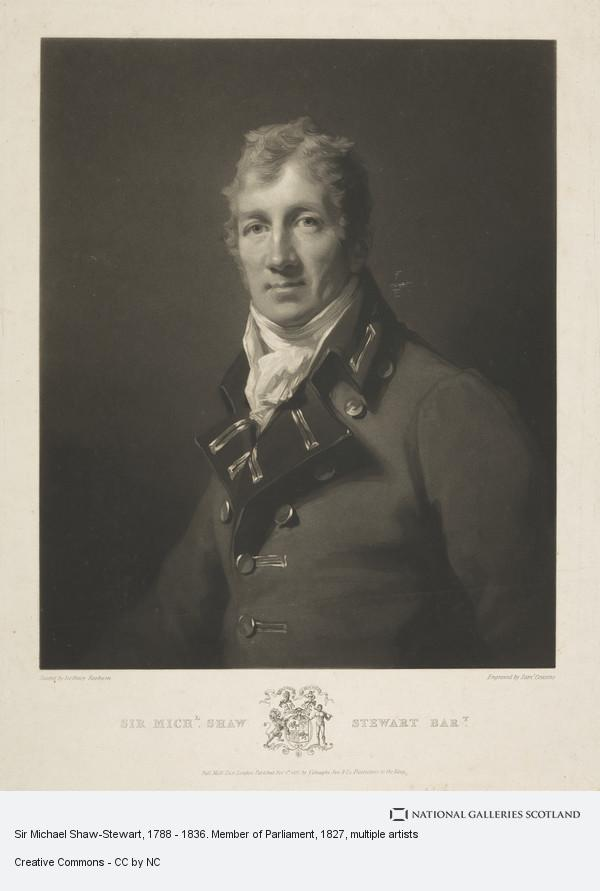
Sir Michael Shaw Stewart 5th Baronet, etching based on portrait by Samuel Blackburn

see

- Sir Michael Shaw Stewart, 5th Baronet at Pollok House
- Thomas Guthrie at Westminster College, Cambridge
- Thomas Mure of Warriston at Newhailes House
- Helen Boyle wife of Thomas Mure of Warriston at Newhailes House
- Sir John Maxwell
