= Oliver Beirne =

Virginia plantation owner

Oliver Beirne (March 26, 1811 - April 21, 1888) was a landowner from western Virginia (now West Virginia), one of the owners of the Old Sweet Springs resort, and sole heir to plantation millionaire John Burnside, of whom he was a longtime friend.

== Early life ==
Oliver Beirne was born on March 26, 1811, the son of Andrew Beirne (1771–1845) and Eleanor "Ellen" Grey Keenan (1779–1824).

== Career ==
Beirne partnered with John Burnside in a mercantile business established in New Orleans in 1837. Beirne retired from the mercantile business in 1847 and Burnside became a wealthy merchant, later owner of The Houmas plantation and another dozen plantations in Louisiana.

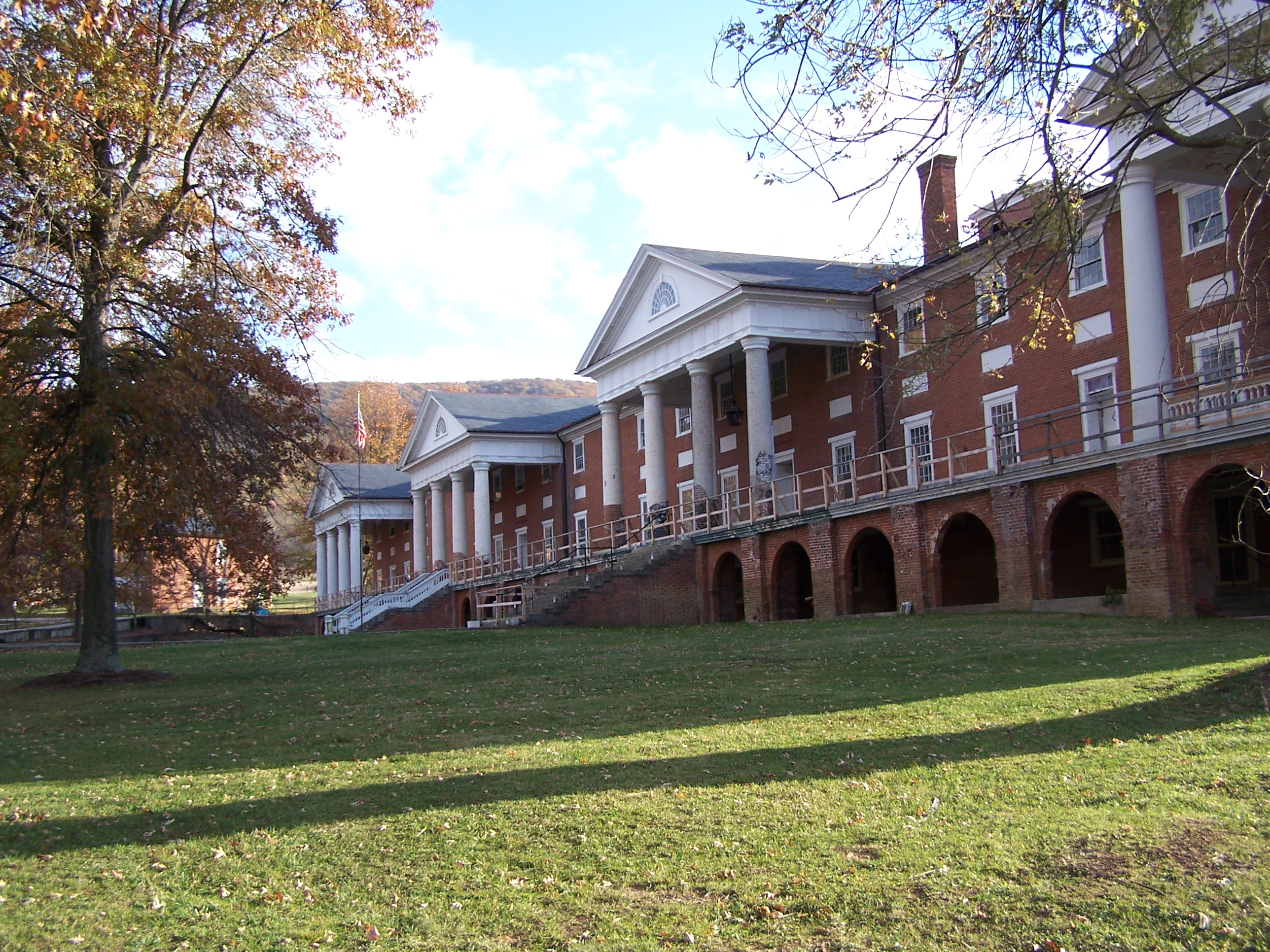
Main building "Sweet Springs Resort" in 2007

Back in Virginia, Oliver Beirne became a landowner and postmaster of Sweet Springs, Virginia (now West Virginia), where he owned the Old Sweet Springs resort. Aside from the resort at Sweet Springs, all other properties still belong to his heirs.

== Personal life ==
Oliver Beirne married Margaret Melinda Caperton (1812–1844) on August 2, 1831. His children were: John, Jane E., Elizabeth "Bettie" Miles (1835–1874) (who married William Porcher Miles), Andrew, Susan Robinson (1840–1871) (married Major Henry Robinson), Nancy (married first Samuel B. Parkman, killed at Antietam, second Emil von Ahlefeldt) and Alice.

John Burnside, his longtime friend from the time when they worked together in New Orleans, was a lifelong bachelor, and when he died on June 29, 1881, he left his entire estate, estimated 5 or 6 million dollars, to Oliver Beirne. When Beirne died Houmas House and the other plantations went to William Porcher Miles, Beirne's son-in-law.
