= John Pegram (politician) =

American politician

Member of the U.S. House of Representatives from Virginia's 19th district
- In office April 21, 1818 – March 3, 1819
- Preceded by: Peterson Goodwyn
- Succeeded by: James Jones

Member of the Virginia House of Delegates from the Dinwiddie County district
- In office 1813–1815

Member of the Virginia Senate from the Dinwiddie County district
- In office 1804–1808

Member of the Virginia House of Delegates from the Dinwiddie County district
- In office December 4, 1797 – 1801

Personal details
- Born: John Pegram; November 16, 1773 Dinwiddie County, Virginia Colony, British America
- Died: April 8, 1831 (aged 57) Petersburg, Virginia, U.S.
- Party: Democratic

Military service
- Allegiance: United States of America
- Branch/service: Virginia militia
- Years of service: 1812–16
- Rank: Major general (USA)

John Pegram (November 16, 1773 – April 8, 1831) was a Virginia planter, soldier and politician who served in the United States House of Representatives, both houses of the Virginia General Assembly and a major general during the War of 1812.

== Early and family life ==
John Pegram was the son of Edward Pegram and Ann Lyle. Born at the "Bonneville" plantation in Dinwiddie County in the Colony of Virginia, Pegram received a private education suitable to his class.

He married Martha Ward Gregory, and they had several children. Decades after his death, three of their grandsons became Confederate officers, as noted below.

== Career ==
As a young adult, Pegram held various local offices and won his first election in 1797, becoming one of Dinwiddie County's (part-time) representatives in the Virginia House of Delegates. He also won re-election and served from 1797 to 1801, then won election to the Virginia Senate, and served one term from 1804 until 1808, before again winning election during the War of 1812, and serving from 1813–15.

In 1802, Col. Pegram replaced revolutionary war veteran John Crawford as commander of Virginia's 39th Militia regiment, composed of white male volunteers from Petersburg who were required to attend yearly (and sometimes monthly or even more often); beginning in 1808 his counterpart in the 83rd Regiment (composed of white men from Dinwiddie County) was Lt.Col. Braddock Goodwyn. Pegram became the major general of the Virginia militia in the War of 1812 and held field command of all state forces. Following the war, Pegram accepted appointment as United States marshal for the eastern district of Virginia, April 23, 1821.

Pegram won a special election as a Democratic-Republican to the Fifteenth Congress to fill the vacancy caused by the death of United States Representative Peterson Goodwyn. He served from April 21, 1818 – March 3, 1819, but did not seek reelection.

== Death and legacy ==
He died at his home in Dinwiddie County and was buried on the family plantation. Three of his grandsons became prominent officers in the Confederate Army of Northern Virginia during the American Civil War—John Pegram, William Ransom Johnson Pegram and Richard Gregory Pegram Jr.

== Notes ==
U.S. House of Representatives
Preceded by Peterson Goodwyn	Member of the U.S. House of Representatives from Virginia's 19th congressional district April 21, 1818 – March 3, 1819 (obsolete district)	Succeeded by James Jones
