= Peterson Goodwyn =

American politician

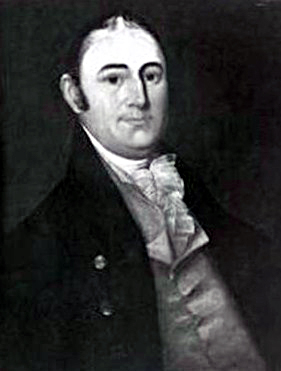

Member of the U.S. House of Representatives from Virginia's 19th congressional district
- In office March 4, 1813 – February 21, 1818
- Preceded by: Edwin Gray
- Succeeded by: John Pegram

Member of the U.S. House of Representatives from Virginia's 18th congressional district
- In office March 4, 1803 – March 3, 1813
- Preceded by: Philip R. Thompson
- Succeeded by: Thomas Gholson, Jr.

Member of the Virginia House of Delegates from Dinwiddie County
- In office November 8, 1796 – December 5, 1802 Serving with Alexander McRae, John Pegram Jr., William Hardaway
- Preceded by: Drury Jones
- Succeeded by: Joseph Goodwyn
- In office October 19, 1789 – November 9, 1795 Serving with Robert Bolling, Drury Jones, Alexander McRae
- Preceded by: George Pegram
- Succeeded by: Drury Jones

Personal details
- Born: 1745 near Petersburg, Virginia Colony, British America
- Died: February 21, 1818 (aged 72–73) Dinwiddie County, Virginia, U.S.
- Resting place: Sweden Cemetery, Sutherland, Virginia, US
- Party: Democratic-Republican
- Spouse: Elizabeth Peterson (1757-1817)
- Children: 7
- Occupation: lawyer, planter, politician

Peterson Goodwyn (1745 – February 21, 1818) was an American planter, lawyer, soldier and politician from Virginia. He served eight terms in the United States House of Representatives from 1803 until his death in 1818.

== Early life ==
Born at his father's plantation "Martins" near Petersburg in the Colony of Virginia to Joseph Goodwyn and his wife the former Martha Thweatt, Goodwyn had at least 11 siblings, including a brother Joseph Goodwyn Jr. who also served in the American Revolutionary War and Dr. William Boswell Goodwyn who practiced in Southampton and whose son and grandson (both William S. Goodwyn) would serve as the Commonwealth attorney and later judge of Greensville County (on a railroad line linking Petersburg with North Carolina). Educated by private tutors as a child, Peterson Goodwyn later read law.

== Personal life ==
Goodwyn was married to Elizabeth Peterson in Dinwiddie, Virginia, in 1779. They had three sons, Edward Osborne, Albert Thweatt, and Peterson Goodwyn Jr., and four daughters, Martha, Lucy Ann, Eliza Peterson, and Emma Eppes Goodwyn. Their marriage lasted until Peterson's death in 1817. The Goodwyn's daughter, Eliza, was the great-grandmother of actor Joseph Cotten.

== Career ==
Goodwyn became a planter and named his plantation "Sweden". He also was admitted to the Virginia bar in 1776, and began his legal practice in Petersburg and surrounding areas.

=== Military service ===
During the Revolutionary War, Goodwyn equipped his own company of Virginia militia and rose through the ranks from captain to major. He was promoted to colonel for gallantry at the Battles of Smithfield and Great Bridge, both in Virginia. After the war, he joined the Society of the Cincinnati.

== Political career ==
Voters in Dinwiddie County elected him multiple times as one of their two representatives in of the Virginia House of Delegates (a part-time position). Goodwyn served from 1789 to 1802, except in the 1795-1796 session, when Drury Jones and Alexander McRae, both of whom he had served alongside, became the county's two representatives.

Voters elected Goodwyn as a Democratic-Republican to the United States House of Representatives in 1802. Re-elected numerous times, he served in the 8th through 15th congresses (1803-1818) and died in office. During the War of 1812, his son Edward Osborne Goodwyn (1776-1841) served as a Captain. His district was originally Virginia's 18th congressional district and after the 1810 census became Virginia's 19th congressional district, although neither district has existed since the 1840s due to Virginia's relative decline as the western states grew.

== Death and burial ==
On February 21, 1818, a year after the death of his wife Elizabeth, Peterson Goodwyn died at his estate "Sweden" in Dinwiddie County, Virginia. He was interred in the family cemetery on the estate. Goodwyn also has a cenotaph at Congressional Cemetery in Washington, D.C.

== Legacy ==
In the 1830 U.S. Federal Census, his son Peterson Goodwyn had a household which included 6 additional white persons and owned 63 enslaved persons; the county at the time included 1048 free white males, 2372 male slaves and 2309 female slaves, as well as 332 free colored persons. In the 1860 U.S. Federal Census his grandson Dr. John P. Goodwyn owned 15 enslaved persons; his holdings in 1850 are listed on a Virginia census not available online. In 1850 Edward "A." Goodwyn owned 20 enslaved persons, and William H. Goodwyn considerably more

By 1835, a post office on the stage road in southern Dinwiddie County was called Goodwynsville, which still existed in 1892. A descendant of the same name, Peterson M. Goodwyn, served in the 12th Virginia Infantry during the American Civil War. However, even the tavern which once stood at Goodwynsville has disappeared; after the Civil War, a railroad linked Petersburg to North Carolina through Dinwiddie County, which led to the development of McKinney, Virginia but Goodwynsville languished. The wooden plantation house that Goodwyn called "Sweden" was near collapse by 1900. The nearest town is Sutherland, Virginia, which was the site of a Confederate defeat on April 2, 1865 which led to disruption of the South Side Railroad, the last Confederate supply line in the closing days of the Appomattox Campaign that ended the American Civil War. A chimney, stone foundation and graveyard existed about a mile past the intersection of county roads 613 and 631. Patrick Magruder, who married Goodwyn's daughter Martha and served one term in Congress from Maryland (1805-1807) before becoming both clerk of the House of Representatives and the Second Librarian of Congress until retiring for health reasons in 1815 is also buried in the family graveyard.

== See also ==
- List of members of the United States Congress who died in office (1790–1899)

U.S. House of Representatives
Preceded by Philip R. Thompson	Member of the U.S. House of Representatives from Virginia's 18th congressional district March 4, 1803 – March 4, 1813 (obsolete district)	Succeeded by Thomas Gholson, Jr.
Preceded by Edwin Gray	Member of the U.S. House of Representatives from Virginia's 19th congressional district March 4, 1813 – February 21, 1818 (obsolete district)	Succeeded by John Pegram
