= History of The New York Times (1851–1896) =

Aspect of newspaper history

The New-York Daily Times was established in 1851 by New-York Tribune journalists Henry Jarvis Raymond and George Jones. The Times experienced significant circulation, particularly among conservatives; New-York Tribune publisher Horace Greeley praised the New-York Daily Times. During the American Civil War, Times correspondents gathered information directly from Confederate states. In 1869, Jones inherited the paper from Raymond, who had changed its name to The New-York Times. Under Jones, the Times began to publish a series of articles criticizing Tammany Hall political boss William M. Tweed, despite vehement opposition from other New York newspapers. In 1871, The New-York Times published Tammany Hall's accounting books; Tweed was tried in 1873 and sentenced to twelve years in prison. The Times earned national recognition for its coverage of Tweed. In 1891, Jones died, creating a management imbroglio in which his children had insufficient business acumen to inherit the company and his will prevented an acquisition of the Times. Editor-in-chief Charles Ransom Miller, editorial editor Edward Cary, and correspondent George F. Spinney established a company to manage The New-York Times, but faced financial difficulties during the Panic of 1893.

== 1851–1861: Origins and initial success ==
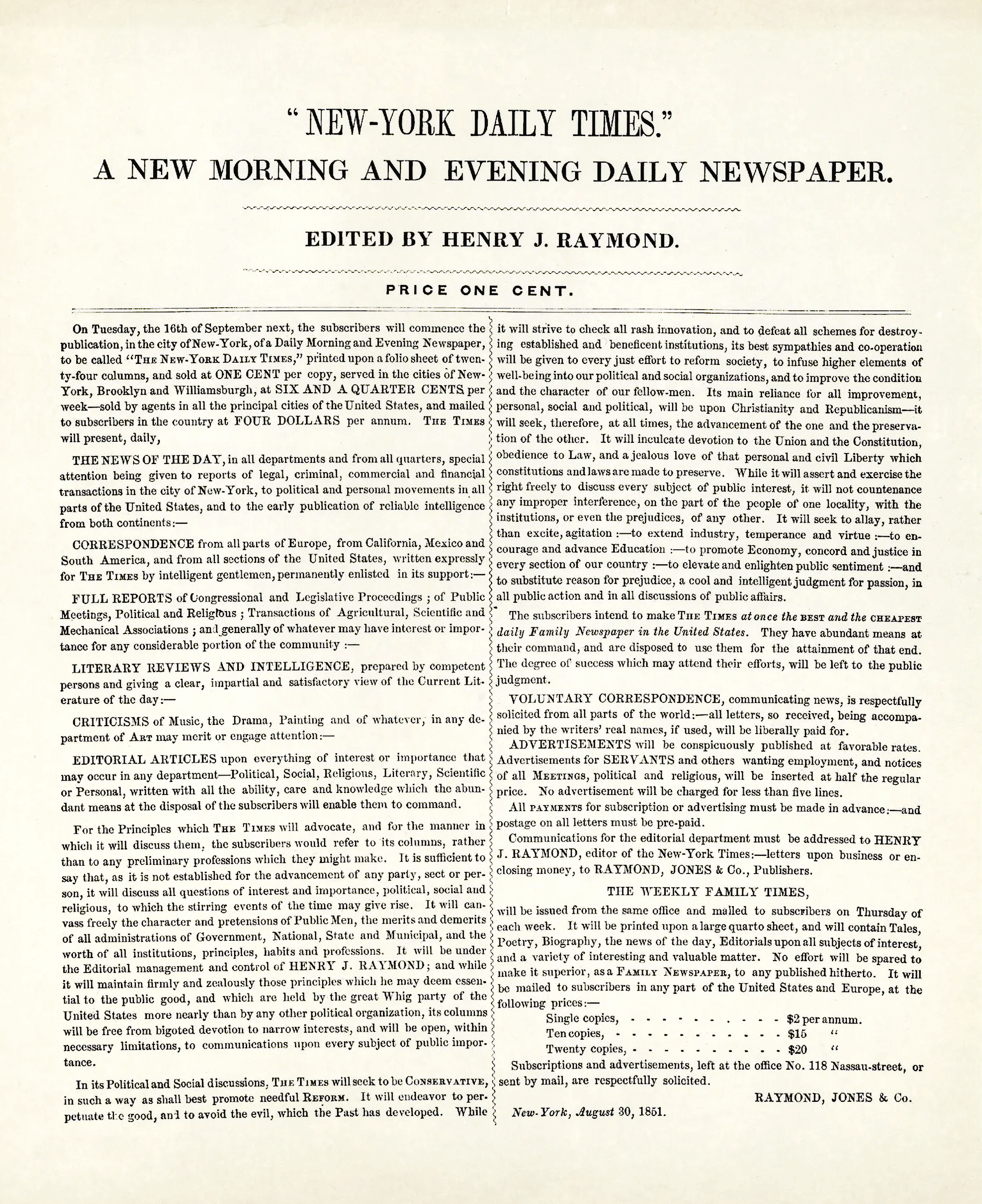
This pre-publication prospectus presented the newspaper's philosophies, including that it "will canvass freely the character and pretensions of Public Men, the merits and demerits of all administrations of Government, National, State and Municipal, and the worth of all institutions, principles, habits and professions".

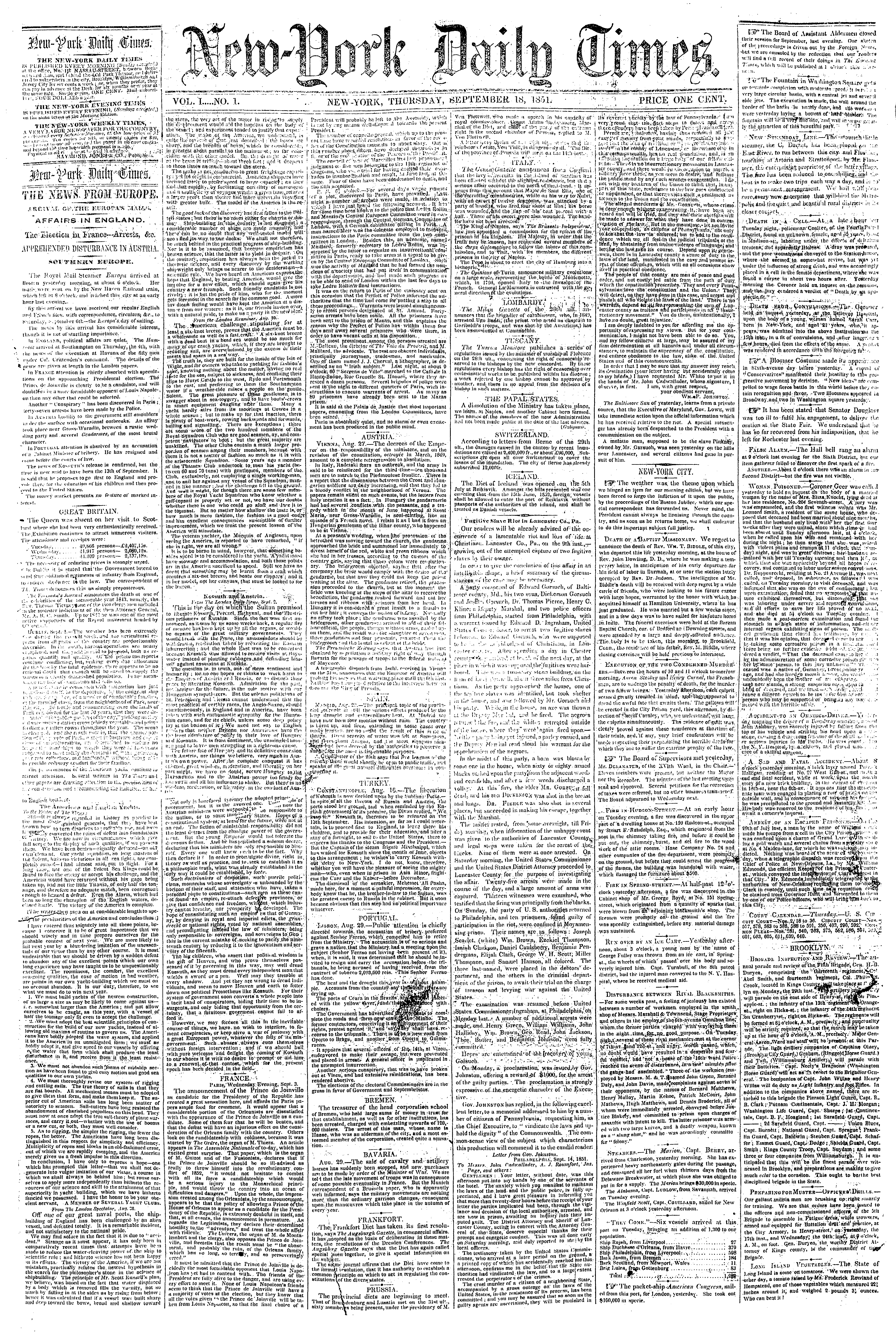
The first issue of The New York Times—initially called the New-York Daily Times—was published on Thursday, September 18, 1851. The name was changed in 1857 to The New-York Times after the evening edition was suspended, and the hyphen was dropped in 1896.

Seven newspapers in New York titled The New York Times existed before the Times in the early 1800s. In 1851, journalists Henry Jarvis Raymond and George Jones working for Horace Greeley at the New-York Tribune formed Raymond, Jones & Company on August 5, 1851. The first issue of the New-York Daily Times was published on September 18, 1851, in the basement of 113 Nassau Street. The Times frequently culled from European newspapers at the time and from within the United States, particularly in California.

The New-York Daily Times was well received by conservatives. By its ninth issue, the Times boasted that it had been circulated ten thousand times. On its first anniversary, the New-York Daily Times announced it had printed 7,550,000 copies and circulated 24,000 copies a day, although these figures were contested by Bennett. The following day, the price of the Times increased to two cents (equivalent to $0.77 in 2025). Early investors of the company included Edwin B. Morgan and Christopher Morgan.

The New-York Daily Times experimented with multiple formats, with the Weekly Family Times circulating until the 1870s, and Semi-weekly Times lasting several years longer. The prevalence in rail transportation also ended the Campaign Times for presidential years. The Times for California was started in 1852 and circulated when mail boats could be sent to California from New York.

By 1854, the New-York Daily Times had moved to Nassau and Beekman Streets. The company purchased the Brick Presbyterian Church in 1857, following the congregation's egress to Murray Hill. Architect Thomas R. Jackson designed a five-story Romanesque Revival building at the 41 Park Row site. When the New-York Daily Times moved into the building in 1858, the paper became the first housed in a building specifically constructed for a newspaper. On September 14, 1857, Raymond shortened the paper's name to The New-York Times.

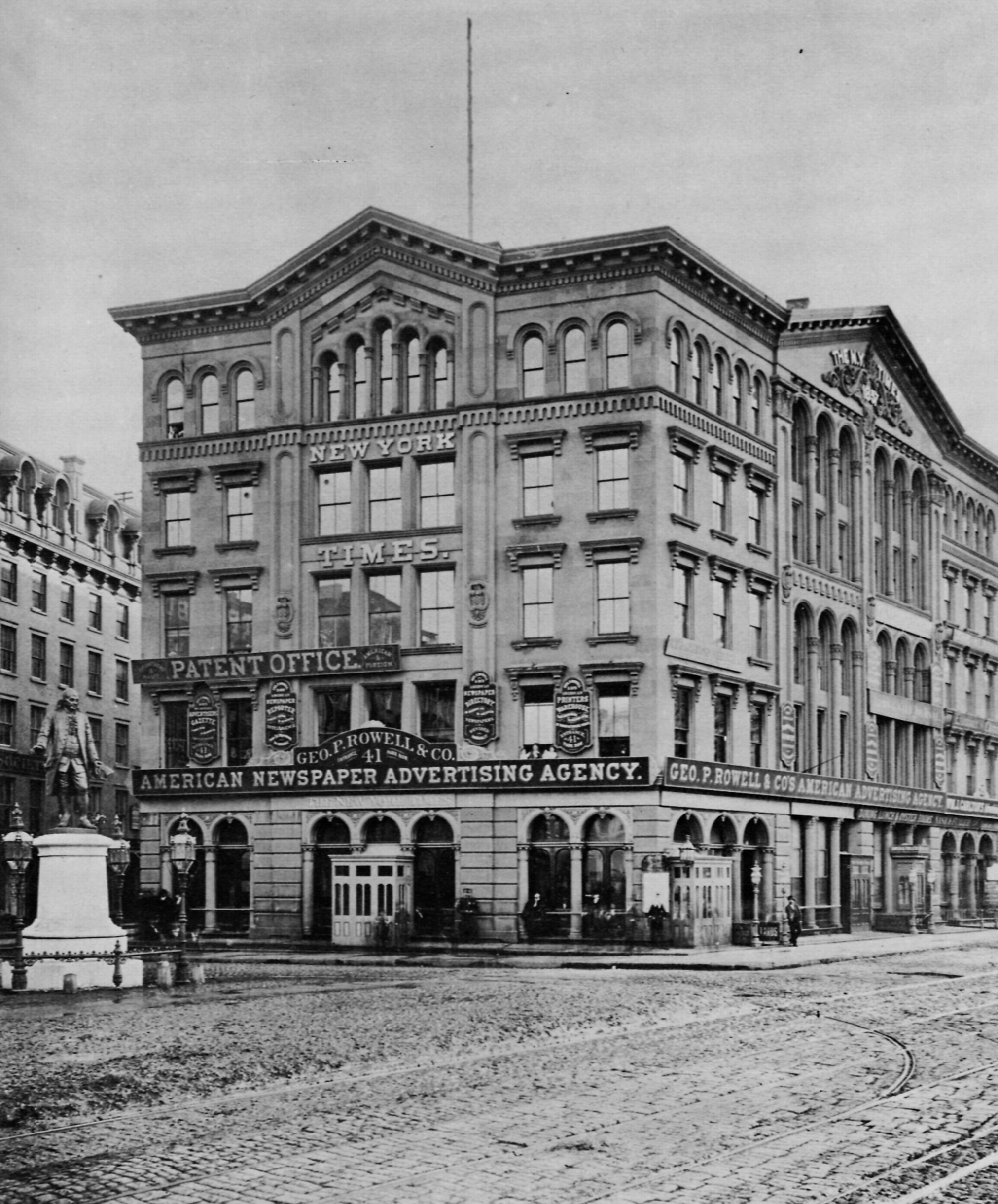
41 Park Row, the headquarters of The New-York Times until 1905.

== 1861–1869: Civil War, expansion, and Raymond's death ==
In the 1860 presidential election, The New-York Times was a leading Republican newspaper. During the Civil War, the Times experienced a transformation necessitated by the public's demand for recent updates on the war. To gather updates, The New-York Times relied on correspondents in Confederate states rather than telegraphs from the Associated Press.

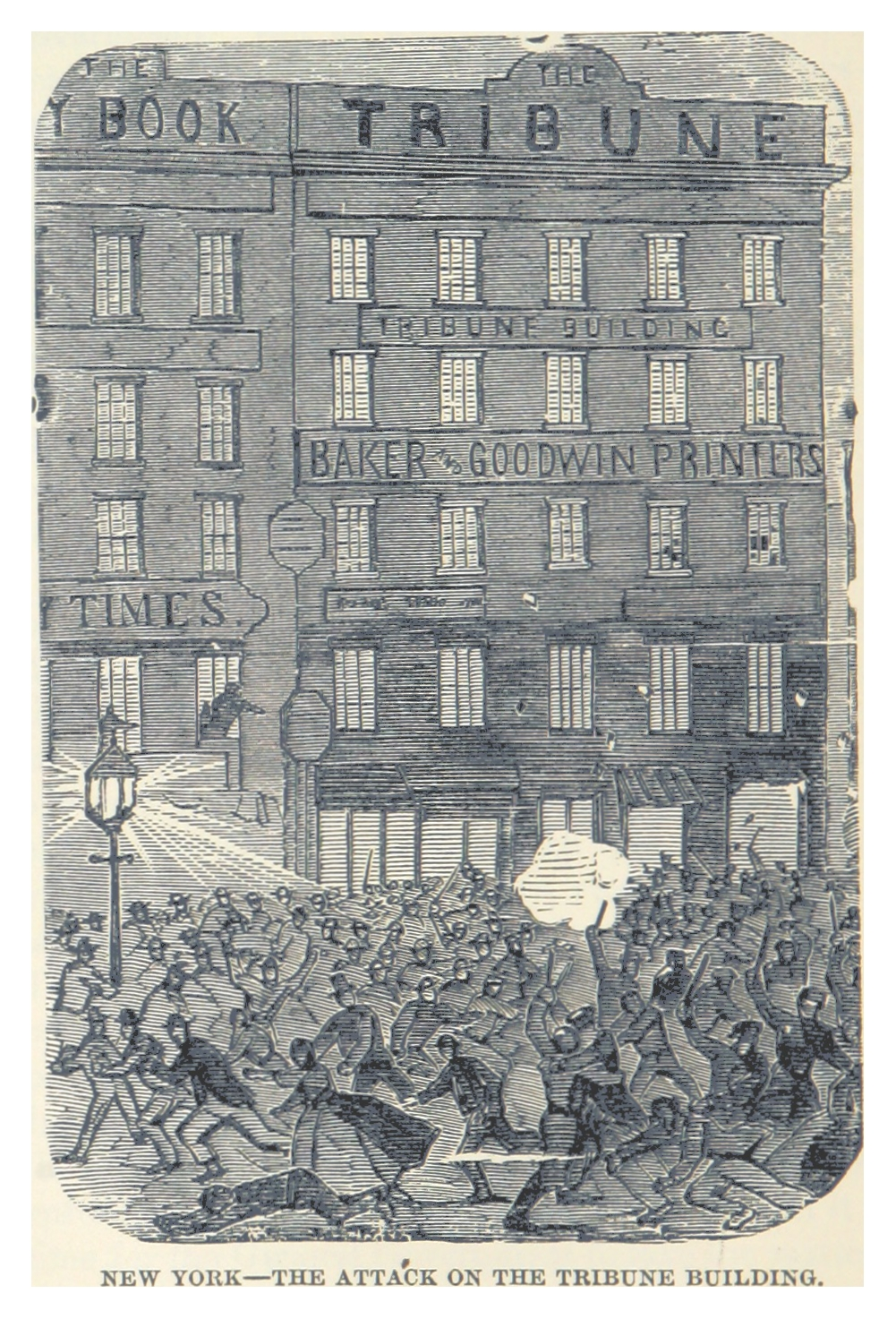
The Tribune building during the New York City draft riots.

The New-York Times correspondents competed against other newspapers to gather as much information as possible. Benjamin C. Truman, a distinguished war correspondent, reported on the Confederacy's repulse in the Battle of Franklin four days before the Department of War heard from John Schofield. Due to mounting opposition to the Civil War in New York, on July 13, 1863, a series of violent disturbances broke out. Thousands of Irish American rioters set flame to the draft registration office and attacked the New-York Tribune office. Warned by the attack on the Tribune, the staff of the Times armed themselves with Gatling guns. Raymond sent sixteen men armed with Minié rifles to the Tribune's office to stave off the mob while two hundred policemen marched onto Printing House Square. The New-York Times remained prideful in its coverage of the event.

The Civil War drove The New-York Times to purchase more presses and to stereotype, an approach tested by the New-York Tribune and met with failure. On April 20, 1861, eight days after the attack on Fort Sumter, the Times began issuing a Sunday edition of the paper. For 3 years, both The Sunday Times and The New-York Times went up in price to four cents (equivalent to $0.82 in 2025), where it would remain until 1883. By May 1861, circulation had gone up by 40,000 issues. In December, the paper extended its columns from six to seven—in line with the English newspaper The Times. The New-York Times suffered a reputational loss in August 1866. Raymond attended the National Union Convention in Philadelphia and composed the Philadelphia Address to endorse Andrew Johnson. The address cost Raymond his position as chairman of the Republican National Committee, and The Times's rivals seized on the opportunity to gain an advantage. According to Raymond, the incident cost the paper US$100,000 (equivalent to US$2.2 million in 2025).

In 1868, The New-York Times supported Grant. Raymond also established principles for the Times to follow, including objecting to "easy but unsound money"—including Greenbacks and later free silver. The paper did not support Samuel J. Tilden in the 1876 presidential election nor William Jennings Bryan in the 1896 presidential election, falling in line with the National Democratic Party. The New-York Times also supported reforming the tariff and introducing a merit system into civil service. The Times also became involved in local issues; in 1868, the paper opposed the Erie Railroad. On June 18, 1869, Raymond died.

At an annual salary of US$9,000 (equivalent to $218,000 in 2025), George Jones inherited the company and took over its editorial and financial end. The New-York Times's directors—composed of Jones, Leonard Jerome, and James B. Taylor—elected John Bigelow editor. The Black Friday of 1869 occurred that year when investors Jay Gould and James Fisk cornered the gold market. The Times published an article by Abel Corbin promoting gold, but its prose was rendered innocuous after financial editor Caleb C. Norvell suggested that Corbin had an ulterior motive to "bull gold". Shortly after Black Friday, Bigelow left The New-York Times, replaced by George Shepard.

== 1869–1876: Jones era, the Tweed Ring, and national recognition ==
No money that could be offered me [Tweed wrote] should induce me to dispose of a single share of my property to the Tammany faction, or to any man associated with it, or indeed to any person or party whatever until this struggle is fought out.

— George Jones, March 29, 1871

Under Jones, The New-York Times actively sought to challenge William M. Tweed and the Tweed Ring. The death of Taylor, who was a business partner of Tweed's through the New-York Printing Company, in September 1870 allowed the Times to attack the Tweed Ring. The New-York Times, except for Harper's Weekly through Thomas Nast, was the only newspaper in New York that actively went against Tweed; municipal advertising created a virtual hush fund. Jennings publicly questioned Tweed's wealth—having gone from bankruptcy in 1865 to owning a mansion on Madison Avenue and 59th Street—in an editorial on September 20. Jennings feuded with the New York World in the following days over his editorial. The Sun jovially suggested a monument of Tweed, a "benefactor of the people", should be erected, although a great deal of readers seriously. The Sun later attacked Jennings, writing that his career was "doomed". The New-York Times and Harper's Weekly's reporting did not elicit a strong response from readers themselves. In October, the Astor Committee—of which John Jacob Astor III was a member—found no wrongdoing, and the Tammany faction was reelected that year.

In January 1871, county auditor James Watson was killed in a sleighing accident. The Times's reporting of the accident a week prior mentioned Watson's US$10,000 (equivalent to $269,000 in 2025) mare, though readers remained unfazed. To replace Watson, Tweed hired Matthew J. O'Rourke, who secretly worked for James O'Brien, a former sheriff and Tammany insurgent. Through William Copeland, a tax accountant and O'Brien adherent, O'Rourke was able to obtain incriminating entries in the Tweed Ring's books. O'Rourke attempted to offer the books to The Sun, who rejected his offer. In March, Tweed proposed purchasing The New-York Times for US$5 million (equivalent to US$134.38 million in 2025), much to Jones's chagrin. Tweed's offer was publicly rejected in the Times on March 29. On July 8, 1871, The New-York Daily Times published the first of these books. The Times published the second set on July 19, after the Orange Riots subsided. The release of the Tweed Ring's books severely damaged Tweed; he offered Jones US$5 million to suppress the stories. In early 1871, Raymond's widow considered selling her stock to Tweed. Jones wired to multimillionaire Edwin D. Morgan, who came out of rural retirement to block the move. The New-York Daily Times continued its coverage from July 22 to 29. Tweed was tried in 1873 and sentenced to twelve years in prison, although he only served a year. For their coverage of the Tweed Ring, the Times received praise from newspapers nationally.

Despite recognition and a steadfast stock price, The New-York Daily Times's circulation numbers remained low (Note: The broad circulation numbers of the Times during this time is unknown. In fall 1871, during the height of the Tweed campaign, The New-York Daily Times's circulation numbers never exceeded 36,000—an outlier period that included the publication of the Tammany books and the election.) and the paper regularly paid high dividends, despite low salaries and living costs. The New-York Tribune was able to use the Times's continuous coverage of Tweed to cover the Great Chicago Fire and the Great Boston Fire of 1872 in greater detail, although the Times was able to cover the Franco-Prussian War through transmissions. In the years following the Tammany campaign, the editors of the Times reconciled their beliefs with the overall Republican Party. In May 1872, the Liberal Republicans gathered to oppose Ulysses S. Grant's reelection bid and the Radical Republicans. At the convention, the Liberal Republicans nominated Horace Greeley. The New-York Times chose to attack Greeley for his beliefs and did not resurface his admiration for Fourierism. The appointment of John C. Reid as managing editor allowed the paper to cover the trial of Henry Ward Beecher in full, a feat unheard of in journalism, though not without criticism from readers who felt that the continuous coverage was vulgar.

== 1876–1896: Democratic support, Jones's death, and financial hardship ==
Ahead of the 1876 presidential election, the Times's editors rejected a third-term for Grant and did not believe James G. Blaine would be a proper candidate. Jennings's radical Republicanism clashed with Jones's moderate beliefs, and he plotted to solidify control of The New-York Times to further his agenda and forge the paper into an organ of the party through the estate of James B. Taylor. Jennings's efforts were stopped when Jones purchased Taylor's stock for US$150,000 (equivalent to US$4.54 million in 2025) on February 4, 1876, a figure widely reported in financial circles; rival papers refused to believe that the stock was worth that much and accused the Times of inflating the price by bidding against Jennings and that part of the price represented "back dividends". Jennings resigned several months later and became a Member of Parliament. John Foord of the Connolly books succeeded him until 1883. Entering the election, The New-York Times was a Republican paper with a streak of independence. Emboldened by the political controversy surrounding the Mulligan letters, which prevented Blaine from receiving the nomination, the Times supported Rutherford B. Hayes and vehemently attacked Samuel J. Tilden.

[The Times] will not support Mr. Blaine for the presidency. It will advise no man to vote for him, and its reasons for this are perfectly well understood by everybody that has ever read it.

— The New-York Times, June 7, 1884

The New-York Times supported James A. Garfield, victor of the 1880 presidential election, during Roscoe Conkling's comity. Frank D. Root of the Times exposed the Star Route scandal in 1881, the same year that the paper exposed New York Supreme Court justice Theodoric R. Westbrook's support for Jay Gould in controlling the Manhattan Railway Company and a US$250,000 (equivalent to US$8.34 million in 2025) fund for Grant, the latter earning the Times more recognition than shock. These exposés sustained The New-York Times in the 1880s. In April 1883, Charles Ransom Miller succeeded Foord as editor-in-chief. Amid breaks in the Republican Party in 1884, the Times supported neither Blaine nor Chester A. Arthur in an editorial on May 23. Although much of the editorial staff believed the paper should support the Republican ticket, the editorials reflected the populace. On June 7, following Blaine's nomination, in an editorial titled, "Facing the Fire of Defeat", The New-York Times officially disassociated with the Republican Party.

Citing his gubernatorial experience, The New-York Times supported Grover Cleveland in the 1884 presidential election. The paper took a financial hit from a net profit of US$188,000 (equivalent to US$6.5 million in 2025) in 1883 to US$56,000 (equivalent to US$2.01 million in 2025), although much of the loss was incurred by the Times decreasing in price from four cents (equivalent to $1.38 in 2025) to two cents (equivalent to $0.72 in 2025). The New-York Times continued to support Cleveland for upholding many of the ideals laid out by Henry Jarvis Raymond. In the late 1880s and throughout the 1890s, the Times faced a changing media landscape, both from within New York and internationally as the Second Industrial Revolution began. The New-York Times published the Spanish Treaty of 1884 on December 8 through cable; at a purported cost of US$8,000 (equivalent to $286,667 in 2025), it is the most expensive cable message the paper has received. Through Harold Frederic's cable letter, readers in New York were able to understand global affairs, including the Proclamation of the Republic in Brazil, which overthrew Pedro II.

As the Dickensian New York dissipated, the Times covered how Charles F. Brush's arc lamps replaced gaslight on Broadway, elevated railroads on Third Avenue, and Thomas Edison's Kinetoscope. A mellower editorial page slowly went under the influence of Edward Cary, a Quaker. The technological advancements in New York made up for a slower news cycle. The New-York Times was the first publication to cover the sinking of the SS Oregon on March 14, 1883. Despite supporting Cleveland in the 1888 presidential election, the Times did not accept Democrat David B. Hill. In part prompted by the construction of the New York Tribune Building, construction on a second building at 41 Park Row began in 1888 using designs from Beaux-Arts architect George B. Post. Reconstructing the building posed a logistical challenge, as employees of the Times needed to work while the new building was erected. The new building gradually took form over the next year, and by April 1889, construction completed. Jones would speak fondly of the new building, although annual profits dropped from US$100,000 (equivalent to US$3.58 million in 2025) in the mid-1880s to US$15,000 (equivalent to US$537,500 in 2025) in 1890.

In the final year of Jones's life, The New-York Times undertook an active effort to undermine the financial wrongdoings of the New York Life Insurance Company through W. C. Van Antwerp. The New York Life Insurance Company personally sued Jones and Miller, but later asked how the company could fix its wrongdoings and appointed John A. McCall president of the company. On the morning of August 12, 1891, Jones died at his home in Poland, Maine. The borders of the next day's paper were blackened and an editorial was written detailing his significance to the paper; it was stated that "no writer of the Times was ever required or asked to urge upon the public views which he did not accept himself". Although his heirs owned a great majority of stock in the Times, they were not journalistically minded. Jones's son, Gilbert, was trained in The New-York Times's office, but neither him nor Jones's son-in-law, Henry L. Dyer, could manage the business properly. The profits left by Jones to his children were without regard for where they came from, and the rest of the family did not hold the paper with value. In late 1892, the staff of The New-York Times learned that the company would likely be sold to a man antithetical to Raymond and Jones's values, although the will stipulated the paper should never be sold.

On April 13, 1893, the Times was sold to the New-York Times Publishing Company, a company managed by Cary, George F. Spinney, and chaired by Miller, for US$1 million (equivalent to US$35.83 million in 2025). (Note: Jones and Dyer accepted selling the paper at US$950,000 (equivalent to US$34.04 million in 2025) after a man who offered US$50,000 (equivalent to US$1.79 million in 2025) discovered that he could not pay the amount. The Jones estate ultimately received the full amount, including the aforementioned offer.) The company that Miller, Spinney, and Cary received was financially unsustainable. Fundamentally, The New-York Times's business model depended on leaner newspaper production, and the Times did not implement cost accounting. The presses were dilapidated; the Linotype machines were leased. With Jones left his expertise on how to manage the rusted printing machines. The men soon discovered that they had rented a building on 41 Park Row at US$40,000 (equivalent to US$1.43 million in 2025), not the structure. The rivalry between William Randolph Hearst and Joseph Pulitzer encouraged the two men to engage in increasingly sensationalist journalism. The free silver movement in 1893 that ultimately led to an economic depression gave the paper a death blow. The men could not find money to carry on the paper nor advertising, although they were able to sell US$250,000 (equivalent to US$8.96 million in 2025) in debenture. In December 1891, the Times increased to three cents (equivalent to $1.07 in 2025), a move that furthered the paper's decline. To advertise the new price, Jones had the borders printed in color.
