= Heman Allen (diplomat) =

American politician (1779–1852)

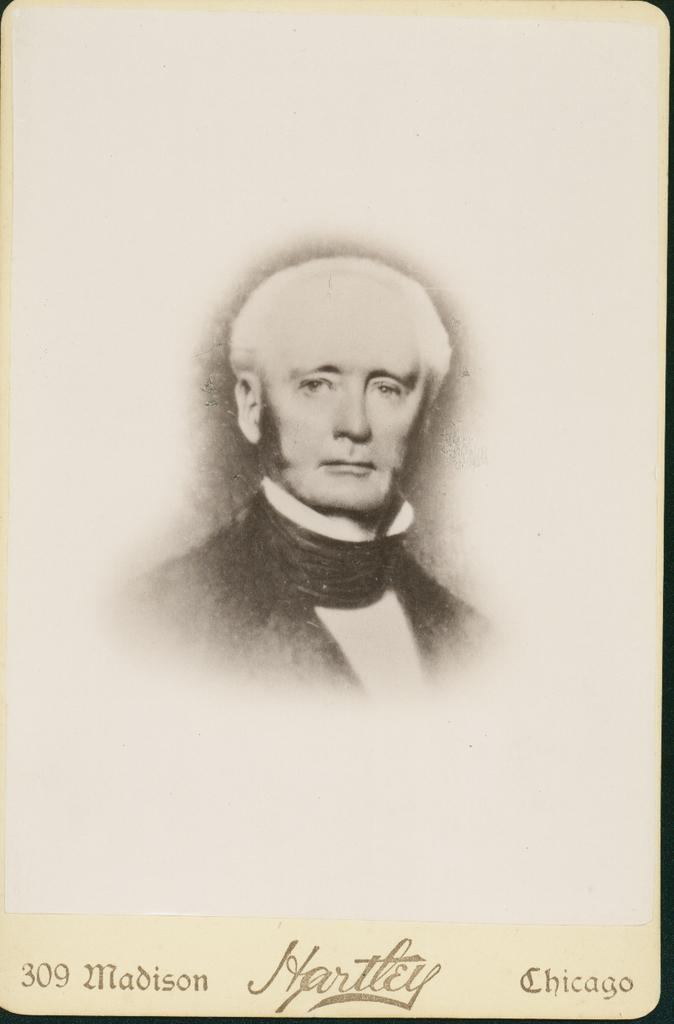

Member of the U.S. House of Representatives from Vermont's at-large district
- In office March 4, 1817 – April 20, 1818
- Preceded by: Asa Lyon
- Succeeded by: William Strong

1st United States Ambassador to Chile
- In office January 27, 1823 – July 31, 1827
- Preceded by: None
- Succeeded by: Samuel Larned

United States Marshal for the District of Vermont
- In office December 14, 1818 – March 2, 1823
- Preceded by: David Robinson
- Succeeded by: Joseph Edson

Member of the Vermont House of Representatives
- In office 1812-1817

Personal details
- Born: February 23, 1779 Poultney, Vermont Republic
- Died: April 7, 1852 (aged 73) Highgate, Vermont, U.S.
- Resting place: Allen Cemetery, Burlington, Vermont
- Party: Democratic-Republican; National Republican; Whig
- Spouse(s): Elizabeth Laura Hart (m. 1823–1834, her death); Eliza Davis Fay (m. 1844–1852, his death)
- Children: 4
- Education: Dartmouth College
- Profession: Lawyer

Heman Allen (February 23, 1779 – April 7, 1852) was an American lawyer, politician and ambassador from Colchester, Vermont. He served as a U.S. representative and as the first United States minister plenipotentiary to Chile.

== Biography ==
Allen was born in Poultney, Vermont Republic on February 23, 1779, the son of Heber Allen (1743–1782) and Sarah (Owen) Allen (1748–1787). He attended the common schools, and graduated from Dartmouth College in 1795. He studied law and was admitted to the bar in 1801. He began the practice of law in Colchester, Vermont.

He was town clerk of Colchester from 1807 until 1817. He served as Sheriff of Chittenden County from 1808 until 1810, when he was succeeded by Heman Lowry. Allen was Chief Justice of the Chittenden County court from 1811 until 1814. He was treasurer of the University of Vermont in 1815.

Allen served as a member of the Vermont House of Representatives from 1812 until 1817. While in the State House he received the appointment of quartermaster of militia, with the rank of Brigadier general. He was elected as a Democratic-Republican candidate to the Fifteenth Congress, serving from March 4, 1817, until his resignation on April 20, 1818. Allen resigned from Congress to become United States Marshal for the district of Vermont on December 14, 1818; he was reappointed on December 24, 1822. Allen was the agent for paying pensioners in 1819.

He was appointed by President James Monroe as America's first United States Minister Plenipotentiary to the new republic of Chile beginning on January 27, 1823. Allen continued in Chile as minister until July 31, 1827.

In 1829, Allen was the unsuccessful gubernatorial candidate of the new Anti-Masonic Party, which supported him though he had not indicated whether he supported the party or its platform. Allen was the unsuccessful National Republican Party candidate in 1831. He served as president of the Burlington branch of the United States Bank from 1830 until the expiration of its charter in 1836. Following the expiration of the bank's charter, he resumed the practice of law in Highgate.

== Personal life ==
When Allen was making arrangements for passage to Chile, he met Elizabeth Hart, the sister-in-law of Isaac Hull. They married before Allen left for his diplomatic mission. She died in 1834, as did their daughter Jeanette.

In 1844, Allen married Eliza Davis Fay. They were the parents of three daughters and a son.

Allen was the nephew of Ira Allen and Ethan Allen. He was the distant cousin of Heman Allen (of Milton). To distinguish between them, Allen was often referred to as Heman Allen (of Colchester) or "Chile Allen" (sometimes "Chili"), while his cousin was called Heman Allen (of Milton).

== Death ==
Allen died on April 7, 1852, in Highgate. He in interred at Allen Cemetery in Burlington.

== See also ==
- List of ambassadors of the United States to Chile

Party political offices
| Preceded by Samuel C. Crafts | National Republican nominee for Governor of Vermont; 1829 | Succeeded by Samuel C. Crafts |
| First | Anti-Masonic nominee for Governor of Vermont; 1831 | Succeeded by William A. Palmer |
U.S. House of Representatives
| Preceded by Asa Lyon | Member of the U.S. House of Representatives from Vermont's at-large congressional district 4 March 1817–20 April 1818 | Succeeded by William Strong |
Diplomatic posts
| United States recognized Chilean Independence | United States Minister Plenipotentiary, Chile; 23 April 1824–31 July 1827 | Succeeded by Samuel Larned |
