= Charles R. Miller =

Charles R. Miller may refer to:

- Charles R. Miller (politician) (1857–1927), American lawyer and politician, governor of Delaware
- Charles R. Miller (general), United States Army general
- Charles Ransom Miller (1849–1922), editor-in-chief of The New York Times
