= Vermont World =

American weekly newspaper

The World
- Type: Weekly Newspaper
- Format: Broadsheet
- Owner(s): World Publications, Inc.
- Publisher: Deborah Phillips and Gary Hass
- Editor: Aaron Retherford
- Founded: 1972
- Language: English
- Headquarters: Berlin, Vermont
- Circulation: 14,000
- Website: www.vt-world.com

The World, VT is a weekly newspaper in Berlin in the U.S. State of Vermont. It was founded in 1972 and focuses on stories about local people and places. The World, VT is published weekly on Wednesdays to over 350 newsstands and covers the areas of Washington and north-central Orange Counties. According to the Vermont Retail & Grocers Association this newspaper not only publishes the weekly newspaper but also produces a monthly coupon book, as well as summer and fall guides. Additionally, the World has health., home improvement, gardening, hunting and other niche publications. It also offers a Senate Report on the Vermont legislature and Max's View with film and television recommendations. According to the American Newspapers Representative database, the World has a weekly free circulation of 28,000.

The Vermont World is owned by World Publications, Inc. and led by co-publishers Deborah Phillips and Gary Hass for 43 years as of February 2018. Deborah Phillips also served as the 2017-2018 Treasurer for the Vermont Press Association.

== National Coverage ==
In February 2018, the World was recognized by the Vermont Retail & Grocers Association (VRGA) as 'Member of the Month'. the VRGA reported that "The World is proud of the work they do with the community—supporting many local nonprofits like Lost Nation Theater, and providing advertising solely for nonprofits on the front cover of the paper."
