= Daniel Peaslee =

American politician

Member of the Vermont Governor's Council
- In office October 10, 1816 – October 13, 1819
- Preceded by: James Tarbox
- Succeeded by: John H. Cotton

Chief Judge of the Orange County, Vermont Court
- In office 1812–1816
- Preceded by: Elisha Hotchkiss
- Succeeded by: Josiah Dana

Sheriff of Orange County, Vermont
- In office 1807–1812
- Preceded by: Micah Barron
- Succeeded by: Joseph Edson

Member of the Vermont House of Representatives from Washington
- In office 1826–1827
- Preceded by: William Kimball
- Succeeded by: Asa Burton
- In office 1813–1816
- Preceded by: Jacob Burton
- Succeeded by: Stuart Brown
- In office 1802–1807
- Preceded by: Jacob Burton
- Succeeded by: Thaddeus White

Personal details
- Born: February 28, 1773 Plaistow, New Hampshire, US
- Died: December 3, 1827 (aged 54) Washington, Vermont, US
- Resting place: Maple Hill Cemetery, Washington, Vermont, US
- Party: Democratic-Republican
- Spouse(s): Elizabeth Hall (m. 1795-c. 1820, her death); Lucy Pepper (m. 1822-1827, his death)
- Children: 5
- Occupation: Merchant; Tavern keeper

Daniel Peaslee (February 28, 1773 – December 3, 1827) was an American businessman, politician and judge. An early settler of Washington, Vermont, he served as chief judge of the Orange County Court despite not having been trained as a lawyer. Peaslee also served as a member of Vermont's Governor's Council, Orange County Sheriff and Washington's member of the Vermont House of Representatives.

== Early life ==
Daniel Peaslee was born in Plaistow, New Hampshire on February 28, 1773, one of several children born to Reuben Peaslee and Judith (Noyes) Peaslee. He was raised and educated in New Hampshire, and moved to Washington, Vermont in 1795. He became a successful merchant and tavern keeper, and was active in the town's Methodist society.

== Career ==
Besides keeping a tavern and store, Peaslee was active in politics and government. A member of the Democratic-Republican Party, he represented Washington in the Vermont House of Representatives from 1802 to 1807, 1813 to 1816, and in 1826.

Peaslee served as sheriff of Orange County from 1807 to 1812. From 1812 to 1816 he served as chief judge of the Orange County Court. In 1814, Peaslee was a delegate to the Vermont constitutional convention. From 1816 to 1819, Peaslee was a member of the Vermont Governor's Council.

== Death and burial ==
Peaslee died in Washington on December 3, 1827. He was buried in Washington's North Cemetery (now called Maple Hill).

== Family ==
In 1795, Peaslee married Elizabeth Hall, with whom he had two children. In 1822, daughter Judith (1796–1865) married Stephen Burton (1796–1886). Son James Peaslee (1799–1822) attended the University of Vermont and died at age 22.

Following his first wife's death, in 1822, Peaslee married Lucy Pepper (1805–1833), who at age 17 was 32 years younger than him. They were the parents of three children: Lucy (1824–1900), the wife of Benjamin Franklin Dickinson (1819–1887), who served as deputy sheriff and sheriff of Orange County; Daniel (1827–1854), who attended Norwich University, married Lucia Tappan (1826–1906) of Newbury, Vermont, and served as Newbury's postmaster; and Laura (1825–1885), the wife of Reverend Alonzo Webster (1818–1887). In 1829, Lucy Pepper Peaslee married George W. West of Washington.

== Sources ==
=== Books ===
- Child, Hamilton (1888). Gazetteer of Orange County, Vt., 1762-1888. Syracuse, New York: The Syracuse Journal Company.
- Deming, Leonard (1851). Catalogue of the Principal Officers of Vermont. Middlebury, Vermont: L. Deming.
- Walton, E. P. (1878). Records of the Governor and Council of the State of Vermont. Vol. VI. Montpelier, Vermont: J. & J. M. Poland.

=== Internet ===
- "New Hampshire Births and Christenings Index, 1714-1904, Birth Entry for Daniel Peaslee". Ancestry.com. Lehi, Utah: Ancestry.com LLC. February 28, 1773.
- Seaver, E. M. (December 31, 1919). "Vermont Vital Records, 1720-1908, Death and Burial Entry for Daniel Peaslee". Ancestry.com. Lehi, Utah: Ancestry.com LLC.
- Davis, Joel (September 22, 1829). "Vermont Vital Records, 1720-1908, Marriage Entry for George W. West and Lucy Peaslee". Ancestry.com. Lehi, Utah: Ancestry.com LLC.

=== Newspapers ===
- "Chelsea Republican Meeting". Vermont Republican. Windsor, Vermont. September 28, 1812 – via Newspapers.com.
- "Republican Ticket". Vermont Republican. Windsor, Vermont. August 16, 1819 – via Newspapers.com.
- "Married: Mr. Stephen Burton and Miss Judith Peaslee". American Repertory and Advertiser. Burlington, Vermont. March 5, 1822 – via Newspapers.com.
- "Married: Hon. Daniel Peaslee and Miss Lucy Pepper". Vermont Republican. Windsor, Vermont. December 2, 1822 – via Newspapers.com.
- "General Summary of News: Daniel Peaslee, Esq". Vermont Journal. Windsor, Vermont. July 1, 1853 – via Newspapers.com.
- "Death Notice, Daniel Peaslee". Vermont Journal. Windsor, Vermont. March 10, 1854 – via Newspapers.com.
