= George W. Barker =

U.S. Marshal for Vermont

Judge of Manitowoc County, Wisconsin
- In office 1864–1869
- Preceded by: H. S. Pierpont
- Succeeded by: W. W. Waldo

Sheriff of Washington County, Vermont
- In office 1843–1846
- Preceded by: Andrew A. Sweet
- Succeeded by: Addison Peck

United States Marshal for the District of Vermont
- In office 1835–1837
- Preceded by: Heman Lowry
- Succeeded by: Heman Lowry

Personal details
- Born: February 22, 1804 Randolph, Vermont, U.S.
- Died: April 7, 1873 (aged 69) Manitowoc, Wisconsin, U.S.
- Resting place: Evergreen Cemetery, Manitowoc, Wisconsin
- Party: Democratic
- Spouse(s): Julia Geer (m. 1827-1864, her death); Mary Coventry (m. 1865-1873, his death)
- Children: 1
- Occupation: Railroad construction contractor Government official

George W. Barker (February 22, 1804 - April 7, 1873) was an American businessman and public official who served in Vermont and Wisconsin. He is best known for his tenure as United States Marshal for the District of Vermont (1835-1837), Sheriff of Washington County, Vermont (1843-1845), and Judge of Manitowoc County, Wisconsin (1864-1869).

== Biography ==
George W. Barker was born in Randolph, Vermont on February 22, 1804, the son of Daniel Barker and Anna (Lathrop) Barker. He was raised and educated in Randolph, where he went into business as the proprietor of the Randolph Hotel. Barker later sold his holdings in Randolph and relocated to Montpelier where he worked as an auctioneer and was employed as an officer of the Vermont House of Representatives. In 1833, Barker was appointed a deputy sheriff of Washington, County. Active in the Democratic Party, in 1835 he was appointed United States Marshal for the District of Vermont, succeeding Heman Lowry. He served until 1837, when Lowry returned to the Marshal's position. In 1836, he was hired by Montpelier's village government to conduct a census of its population and businesses. From 1837 to 1840, Barker served as Montpelier's postmaster.

In 1839, Barker and partner J. T. Martson purchased Montpelier's Vermont Patriot newspaper, a leading Democratic outlet. Other ventures in which Barker was interested included acting as the sales agent for several Vermont counties in retailing two patent medicines, Goelicke's Matchless Sanative and Phelps' Compound Tomato Pills. From 1843 to 1846, Barker served as Washington County Sheriff.

In the 1840s and 1850s, Barker received construction contracts during the creation of the Central Vermont Railroad and his successful execution made him wealthy. He then received contracts to construct portions of the Rutland and Washington Railroad; when this venture failed during the Panic of 1857, Barker lost his fortune and moved to Painesville, Ohio. His railroad construction efforts there also proved unsuccessful, and Barker moved to Manitowoc, Wisconsin.

In Wisconsin, Barker undertook construction for the Appleton and New London Railway (later the Milwaukee, Lake Shore and Western Railroad). The railroad was a success, which enabled Barker to restore his finances. Still active in politics as a Democrat, Barker served as Manitowoc County Judge from 1864 to 1869.

Barker died in Manitowoc on April 7, 1873. He was buried at Evergreen Cemetery in Manitowoc.

== Family ==
In 1827, Barker married Julia Geer of Chaplin, Connecticut. She died in 1864 and in 1865 he married Mary Coventry, the widow of Washington Goodnow. With his first wife, Barker was the father of a son, George (1837-1851).

== Sources ==
=== Internet ===
- "Vermont Vital Records, 1720-1908, Birth Entry for Geo. W. Barker". Ancestry.com. Lehi, UT: Ancestry.com, LLC.
- Births, Marriages and Deaths 1822 – 1851 (September 30, 1827). "Marriage Record, George W. Barker and Julia Geer". Barbour Collection of Connecticut Vital Records. CTGenweb Project.
- "Vermont Vital Records, 1720-1908, Death Entry for George Barker". Ancestry.com. Lehi, UT: Ancestry.com, LLC.
- "George W. Barker and Mary Coventry Goodnow in the Wisconsin Marriage Index, 1820-1907". Ancestry.com. Lehi, UT: Ancestry.com, LLC.
- "List of Burials at Evergreen Cemetery". Manitowoc.org. Manitowoc, WI: City of Manitowoc. November 22, 2011. p. 17.

=== Newspapers ===
- "Travelers Attend Randolph Hotel". Vermont Watchman and State Journal. Montpelier, VT. April 8, 1828. p. 4 – via Newspapers.com.
- "Auction Sales". Vermont Patriot and State Gazette. Montpelier, VT. January 14, 1833. p. 1 – via Newspapers.com.
- "Appointments by the Speaker". Vermont Republican. Windsor, VT. October 25, 1833. p. 2 – via Newspapers.com.
- "Geo. W. Barker and Isaac Riker Appointed Deputy Sheriffs". Vermont Patriot and State Journal. Montpelier, VT. December 9, 1833. p. 3 – via Newspapers.com.
- "Announcement: Geo. W. Barker Appointed Marshal". Vermont Gazette. Bennington, VT. January 12, 1836. p. 3 – via Newspapers.com.
- "Village Statistics of Montpelier". Burlington Weekly Free Press. Burlington, VT. July 15, 1836. p. 1 – via Newspapers.com.
- "Heman Lowry to be Marshal". Vermont Watchman and State Journal. Montpelier, VT. March 21, 1837. p. 2 – via Newspapers.com.
- "Announcement: Matchless Sanative for Sale". Vermont Patriot. Montpelier, VT. October 30, 1837. p. 2 – via Newspapers.com.
- "Announcement: Vermont Patriot". The North Star. Danville, VT. April 6, 1839. p. 2 – via Newspapers.com.
- "Announcement: Dr. Phelps' Compound Tomato Pills". Vermont Watchman and State Journal. Montpelier, VT. September 28, 1840. p. 4 – via Newspapers.com.
- "Death Notice, Mrs. George W. Barker". Green Mountain Freeman. Montpelier, VT. May 10, 1864. p. 3 – via Newspapers.com.
- "Death Notice, Geo. W. Barker". The Manitowoc Pilot. Manitowoc, WI. April 10, 1873. p. 4 – via Library of Congress, Historic American Newspapers.
- "Death of George W. Barker". Argus and Patriot. Montpelier, VT. April 24, 1873. p. 2 – via Newspapers.com.

=== Books ===
- Deming, Leonard (1851). Catalogue of the Principal Officers of Vermont. Middlebury, VT: L. Deming. p. 98 – via Internet Archive.
- Falge, Louis (1912). History of Manitowoc County, Wisconsin. Vol. I. Chicago, IL: Goodspeed Publishing Company. p. 78 – via University of Wisconsin Digital Collections.
- Hemingway, Abby Maria (1882). The History of the Town of Montpelier. Montpelier, VT: A. M. Hemenway – via Internet Archive.
