= Joseph Edson =

U.S. Marshal for Vermont

United States Marshal for the District of Vermont
- In office March 13, 1823 – June 6, 1829
- Preceded by: Heman Allen
- Succeeded by: Heman Lowry

Sheriff of Orange County, Vermont
- In office 1815–1822
- Preceded by: Harry Hale
- Succeeded by: Abel Carter
- In office 1812–1813
- Preceded by: Daniel Peaslee
- Succeeded by: Harry Hale

Personal details
- Born: March 3, 1782 Randolph, Vermont, U.S.
- Died: March 7, 1832 (aged 50) Randolph, Vermont, U.S.
- Resting place: Randolph Center Cemetery, Randolph, Vermont
- Party: Democratic-Republican
- Spouse: Sarah Throop (m. 1802-1832, his death)
- Children: 5
- Occupation: Farmer

Joseph Edson (March 3, 1782 – March 7, 1832) was a farmer, military leader, and government official in Vermont. Among the offices in which he served were United States Marshal for the District of Vermont (1823-1829), Sheriff of Orange County (1812-1813, 1815–1822), and commander of the Vermont Militia's 4th Division with the rank of major general in 1822.

== Life ==
=== Early life ===
Joseph Edson was born in Randolph, Vermont on March 3, 1782, a son of Josiah Edson (1758-1819) and Sarah (Pinney) Edson (1756-1804). He was educated in Randolph and became a farmer. A Democratic-Republican, Edson began a career in government at an early age, serving as a town constable from 1805 to 1809. after serving as deputy sheriff, he was elected Sheriff of Orange County and served from 1812 to 1813, and then again from 1815 to 1822.

Edson also became active in the militia. During the War of 1812 he was commissioned as a major, and helped organize the Randolph-area contingent that took part in the defense of Plattsburgh in September 1814. He continued to serve in the militia, and was commander of 1st Brigade, 4th Division from 1818 to 1822 with the rank of brigadier general. In 1822 he was appointed to command the 4th Division and promoted to major general.

From 1815 to 1821, Edson served as a trustee of Randolph's Orange County Grammar School. In March 1823, Edson was appointed United States Marshal for the District of Vermont, succeeding Heman Allen. He served until June 1829, when he was succeeded by Heman Lowry.

Edson died in Randolph on March 7, 1832. He was buried at Randolph Center Cemetery in Randolph.

=== Family ===
In 1802, Edson married Sarah Throop (1783-1863) of Bethel, Vermont. They were the parents of five children:

- Elizabeth (1804-1850), the wife of Rev. George H. Williams, a professor at the University of Michigan
- Sarah (1806-1851), the wife of Edmund Weston of Randolph
- Nathaniel (1808-1853), a graduate of Union College who studied law with Dudley Chase and became an attorney in Albany, New York
- Royal (1811-1849), a merchant in Woodstock, Vermont
- Olivia (1824-1893), the wife of Rev. John A. Wilson, pastor of a church in Ypsilanti, Michigan

== Sources ==
=== Books ===
- Deming, Leonard (1851). Catalogue of the Principal Officers of Vermont. Middlebury, VT: L. Deming – via Internet Archive.
- Wells, Harriet Hyde; Van Dyke, Herry Weston (1901). Several Ancestral Lines of Josiah Edson and His Wife Sarah Pinney, Married at Stafford, Conn., July 1, 1779. Albany, NY: J. Munsell's Sons – via Internet Archive.
- The Illustrated Historical Souvenir of Randolph, Vermont. Randolph, VT: Nickerson & Cox. 1895 – via HathiTrust.

=== Newspapers ===
- "Sales at Auction". Weekly Wanderer. Randolph, VT. May 9, 1808 – via Newspapers.com.
- "Military Appointments". Vermont Republican and American Yeoman. Windsor, VT. November 16, 1818 – via Newspapers.com.
- "In Joint Committee, Oct. 25". Vermont Watchman and State Journal. Montpelier, VT. October 29, 1822 – via Newspapers.com.
- "Appointment by the President: Joseph Edson". Rutland Herald. Rutland, VT. April 23, 1823 – via Newspapers.com.
- "To Joseph Edson, Esq". Vermont Watchman and State Journal. Montpelier, VT. July 30, 1827 – via Newspapers.com.
- "Appointment of Heman Lowry, Esq". Vermont Gazette. Bennington, VT. June 2, 1829 – via Newspapers.com.

=== Internet ===
- "Vermont Vital Records, 1720-1908 Death and Burial Entry for Joseph Edson". Ancestry.com. Lehi, UT: Ancestry.com LLC.
