= East Poultney, Vermont =

Census-designated place in Vermont, United States

- Census-designated place
- Location within Vermont Location within the United States
- Coordinates: 43°31′33″N 73°12′39″W
- Country: United States
- State: Vermont
- County: Rutland
- Town: Poultney
- Elevation: 499 ft (152 m)
- Time zone: UTC-5 (Eastern (EST))
  - Summer (DST): UTC-4 (EDT)
- Area code: 802
- GNIS feature ID: 2807148

East Poultney is an unincorporated village and census-designated place (CDP) in the town of Poultney, Rutland County, Vermont, United States. As of the 2020 census, East Poultney had a population of 288. The community is located along Vermont Route 140 1.7 miles (2.7 km) east-northeast of the village of Poultney.
