= 1829 Vermont gubernatorial election =

- September 1, 1829
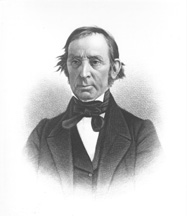

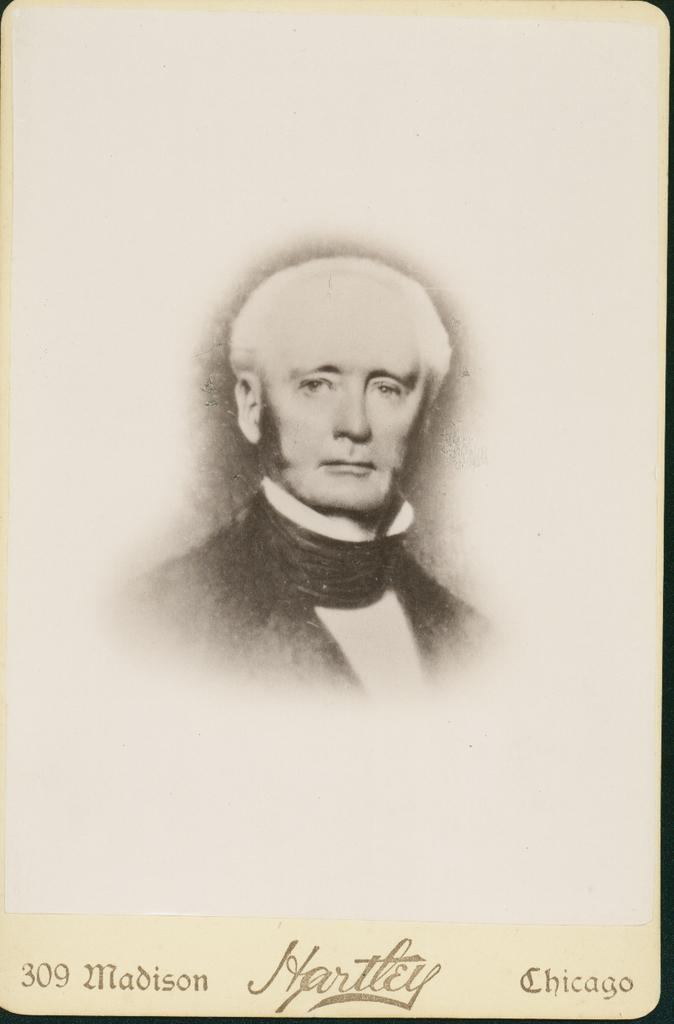

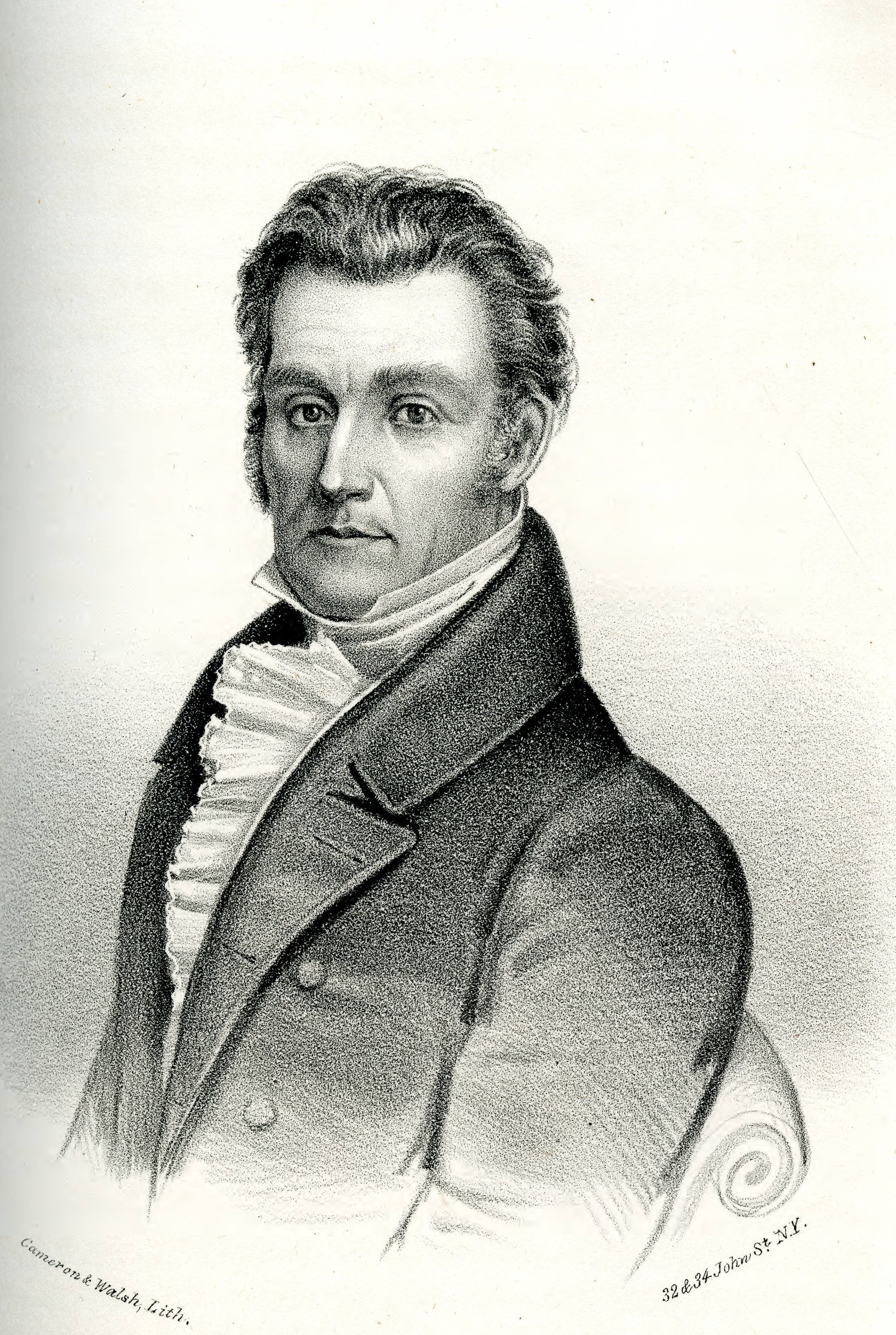
| Nominee | Samuel C. Crafts | Heman Allen | Joel Doolittle |
| Party | National Republican | Anti-Masonic | Jacksonian |
| Popular vote | 14,325 | 7,346 | 3,973 |
| Percentage | 55.75% | 28.59% | 15.46% |
- County results Crafts: 40–50% 50–60% 60–70% 70–80% Allen: 70–80% Doolittle: 30–40%
Governor before election
Samuel C. Crafts
Democratic-Republican
Elected Governor
Samuel C. Crafts
Democratic-Republican

The 1829 Vermont gubernatorial election took place on September 1, 1829. It resulted in the election of Samuel C. Crafts to a one-year term as governor.

The Vermont General Assembly met in Montpelier on October 8. The Vermont House of Representatives appointed a committee to review the votes of the freemen of Vermont for governor, lieutenant governor, treasurer, and members of the governor's council. The committee determined that Crafts had won election to a one-year term as governor.

In the election for lieutenant governor, the committee determined that Democratic-Republican Henry Olin had won election to a third one-year term. A contemporary newspaper account reported the vote totals as: Olin, 19,740 (81.5%); Lyman Fitch, 4,481 (18.5%).

Benjamin Swan won election to a one-year term as treasurer, his thirtieth. Though he had nominally been a Federalist, Swan was usually endorsed by the Democratic-Republicans and even after the demise of the Federalist Party he was frequently unopposed. As reported in Vermont's newspapers, the vote totals were: Swan 15,631 (99.9%); scattering, 10 (0.1%).

In the governor's race, the new Anti-Masonic Party fielded a candidate for the first time, supporting Heman Allen though Allen had not indicated whether he identified with the party or its platform. The vote totals in the governor's race were reported as follows:

== Results ==
1829 Vermont gubernatorial election
| Party | Candidate | Votes | % |
|---|---|---|---|
| National Republican | Samuel C. Crafts (incumbent) | 14,325 | 55.75 |
| Anti-Masonic | Heman Allen (of Colchester) | 7,346 | 28.59 |
| Jacksonian | Joel Doolittle | 3,973 | 15.46 |
| Write-in | | 50 | 0.20 |
| Total votes | | 25,694 | 100.0 |
