= Heman Lowry =

U.S. Marshal for Vermont

United States Marshal for the District of Vermont
- In office March 7, 1837 – March 9, 1841
- Preceded by: George W. Barker
- Succeeded by: William Barron
- In office June 6, 1829 – December 29, 1835
- Preceded by: Joseph Edson
- Succeeded by: George W. Barker

Sheriff of Chittenden County, Vermont
- In office 1835–1836
- Preceded by: George A. Allen
- Succeeded by: George A. Allen
- In office 1815–1827
- Preceded by: Jacob Davis
- Succeeded by: Moses Bliss
- In office 1810–1814
- Preceded by: Heman Allen
- Succeeded by: Moses Bliss

Personal details
- Born: September 4, 1778 North East, New York, U.S.
- Died: January 5, 1848 (aged 69) Burlington, Vermont, U.S.
- Resting place: Elmwood Cemetery, Burlington, Vermont
- Party: Democratic-Republican; Democratic
- Spouse(s): Lucy Lee (m. 1800-1801, her death); Margaret Campbell (m. 1803-1848, his death)
- Children: 9
- Occupation: Farmer; Government official

Heman Lowry (September 4, 1778 – January 5, 1848) was a county, state and federal government official in Vermont. He was a delegate to two state constitutional conventions (1814, 1828). Lowry was also the longtime sheriff of Chittenden County (1810-1813, 1815-1827, 1835-1836). In addition, he served twice as U.S. Marshal for Vermont (1829-1835, 1837-1841).

== Life ==
Lowry was born in North East, New York on September 4, 1778, the son of Thomas Lowry and Phoebe (Benedict) Lowry. The Lowry family (sometimes spelled Lowrey) moved to Jericho, Vermont in 1789, and after completing his education Lowry became a farmer in Jericho. Active in politics as a Democratic-Republican, and later as a Democrat, in 1809 he became high bailiff of Chittenden County. In 1810 he became sheriff and he served until 1813. He returned to the position in 1815 and served until 1827. He was Jericho's delegate to the state constitutional convention in 1814, and the delegate from Burlington in 1828. After moving to Burlington, Lowry owned and operated a farm on Shelburne Road.

In 1829, Lowry was appointed U.S. Marshal for Vermont, a position he held until 1835. In 1835 and 1836, he again served as sheriff of Chittenden County. Lowry served as president of the 1836 state Democratic convention and was chosen as a member of the party's state committee. He was reappointed as Marshal in 1837 and he served until 1841.

Lowry was a delegate to the Democratic state convention in 1841, and president of the party's Chittenden County convention in 1842. He was also president of the Democratic county convention in July 1843. In November 1843, Lowry was one of several prominent Vermont Democrats who took part in an event at which the guest of honor was former Vice President Richard M. Johnson, who was campaigning for the party's 1844 presidential nomination. In 1844 he was one of the organizers of the Chittenden County Agricultural Society.

Lowry died in Burlington on January 5, 1848. Cemetery records indicate he was buried at Elmwood Cemetery in Burlington. (Note: There is also a headstone for Lowry at Lowrey Cemetery in Jericho, which indicates that either he was reinterred at Lowrey Cemetery after initial burial at Elmwood, or that the grave marker at Lowrey Cemetery is a cenotaph.)

== Family ==
In 1800, Lowry married Lucy Lee of Jericho. She died in 1801, and in 1803 he married Margaret Campbell, who died in 1849. With his first wife, Lowry was the father of daughter Lucy (1801-1854) who died as a resident of the state insane asylum in Brattleboro.

With his second wife, Lowry was the father of:

- Anne (or Ann) (1804-1899), who never married and was a lifelong resident of Burlington
- Julia (1806-1902), the wife of St. John B. L. Skinner, who served as Assistant Postmaster General during the administration of President Ulysses S. Grant
- Thomas (1808-1852)
- George (1809-1869), the longtime Deputy U.S. Collector of Customs for Vermont
- Mary (1811-1898)
- Francis (1814-1902), a career United States Navy officer who attained the rank of captain
- Fanny (1817-1892), a career employee of the United States Post Office Department who worked for several years in the dead letter office
- Heman Jr. (1819-1860), the keeper of the state prison in Dannemora, New York

== Sources ==
=== Books ===
- Carleton, Hiram (1903). Genealogical and Family History of the State of Vermont. Vol. II. New York, NY: The Lewis Publishing Company – via Internet Archive.
- Deming, Leonard (1851). Catalogue of the Principal Officers of Vermont. Middlebury, VT: L. Deming – via Google Books.

=== Magazines ===
- Smalley, David A. (1867). "Biography: Heman Lowry". The Vermont Historical Gazetteer. Vol. 1. Burlington, VT: Abby Maria Hemenway – via Google Books.
- Wilbur, L. F. (1916). Hayden, Chauncey H.; Stevens, Luther C.; Wilbur, LaFayette; Barnum, S. H. (eds.). "The Lowrey Family". The History of Jericho, Vermont. Burlington, VT: Free Press Printing Company – via Internet Archive.

=== Newspapers ===
- "Proceedings of the Legislature of the State of Vermont: Wednesday, October 18". Vermont Journal. Windsor, VT. October 30, 1809 – via Newspapers.com.
- "Heman Lowry Appointed Marshal of the District of Vermont". Vermont Gazette. Bennington, VT. June 2, 1829 – via Newspapers.com.
- "State Convention". Burlington Sentinel. Burlington, VT. July 8, 1836 – via Newspapers.com.
- "Appointment by the President: George W. Barker". Burlington Sentinel. Burlington, VT. January 8, 1836 – via Newspapers.com.
- "Appointments by the President: Heman Lowry". Vermont Watchman and State Journal. Montpelier, VT. March 21, 1837 – via Newspapers.com.
- "Gen Wm. Barron of Bradford". Burlington Sentinel. Burlington, VT. March 19, 1841 – via Newspapers.com.
- "Democratic Convention". The North Star. Danville, VT. June 25, 1841 – via Newspapers.com.
- "Democratic State Convention". Spirit of the Age. Woodstock, VT. June 25, 1841 – via Newspapers.com.
- "Democratic County Convention (1842)". Burlington Sentinel. Burlington, VT. April 29, 1842 – via Newspapers.com.
- "Democratic County Convention (1843)". Burlington Sentinel. Burlington, VT. July 12, 1843 – via Newspapers.com.
- "Col. Johnson". Burlington Free Press. Burlington, VT. November 3, 1843 – via Newspapers.com.
- "Agricultural Society". Burlington Free Press. Burlington, VT. January 5, 1844 – via Newspapers.com.
- "Obituary, George Lowry". Burlington Free Press. Burlington, VT. May 31, 1869 – via Newspapers.com.
- "The Late Miss Fanny Lowry". Burlington Free Press. Burlington, VT. October 5, 1892 – via Newspapers.com.
- "The Lowry Family". Burlington Free Press. Burlington, VT. December 10, 1902 – via Newspapers.com.
- "A Pioneer's Daughter". Burlington Clipper. Burlington, VT. December 13, 1902 – via Newspapers.com.

=== Internet ===
- Burlington (VT) City Clerk (November 2, 1921). "Vermont Vital Records, 1720-1908, Death and Burial Record for Heman Lowry". Ancestry.com. Lehi, UT: Ancestry.com, LLC.
- Burlington (VT) City Clerk (November 2, 1921). "Vermont Vital Records, 1720-1908, Death and Burial Record for George Lowry". Ancestry.com. Lehi, UT: Ancestry.com, LLC.
