= Ebenezer Allen (Vermont politician) =

American politician

- Born: October 17, 1743; Northampton, Massachusetts, US
- Died: March 26, 1806; Burlington, Vermont, US
- Resting place: Elmwood Cemetery, Burlington
- Occupations: Soldier, pioneer, politician
- Known for: founder of Poultney, Vermont
- Spouse: Lydia Richards (1746–1833)

Ebenezer Allen (1743–1806) was an American soldier, pioneer, and member of the Vermont General Assembly.

== Early life ==
Allen was born in Northampton, Massachusetts, on October 17, 1743. His parents were Samuel Allen (1706–1755) and Hannah Miller (1707–1755). Allen married Lydia Richards (1746–1833) at New Marlborough, Massachusetts, in 1762. She was the daughter of Zebulon Richards and Lydia Brown.

Along with Thomas Ashley, Allen was a founder of Poultney, Vermont. Allen and Ashley (both had married daughters of Zebulon Richards) arrived at the site of the town along the Poultney River on April 15, 1771. Allen brought his family with him on the journey. Ashley traveled alone, building a shanty and planting corn before bringing his family to the wilderness.

Poultney was a patriotic village. All of its residents (except one) supported the American Revolution and most males served in the revolutionary army at various times during the war.

== Career ==
Allen became a Lieutenant in a company of Green Mountain Boys, was with Ethan Allen when Ft. Ticonderoga was captured from the British, and with Colonel Warner in Canada. He was appointed a captain in Colonel Herrick's battalion of rangers in July 1777, and distinguished himself at the battle of Bennington. In September of the same year he captured Mt. Defiance by assault, and on the retreat of the enemy from Fort Ticonderoga made fifty of them prisoners. Subsequently, he was made major in the rangers, and showed himself a brave partisan leader. In his later life he was always referred to as Col. Allen.

Allen occupied many positions of civil authority in Vermont. He was a Justice of the Peace, served on many town committees, and was a representative to the Vermont General Assembly from 1788 to 1792. He was prominent in the planning of a new government for Vermont, helping to frame its constitution.

Allen was one of the original grantees of South Hero, Vermont by an act of the legislature in 1779. He left Poultney with his family for South Hero, Vermont, where he once again was the first pioneer in a wilderness—tradition states that he arrived on August 25, 1783, however he may have arrived as early as 1779. In 1787 he enlarged his house and operated a public house on the island. He held many public offices and was a representative to the Vermont General Assembly from 1788 to 1792. His cousin, Ethan Allen, spent the last night of his life at his house in South Hero. Ebenezer removed from South Hero to Burlington, Vermont, in 1800 and operated a tavern there until his death in 1806.

On November 27, 1777, Allen granted freedom to two enslaved people in a document dated at Poultney, Vermont, stating: "I being conscientious that it is not right in the sight of God to keep slaves, give them their freedom."

In 1792 Allen toured the unsettled portions of Ohio, Michigan and Upper Canada with a group of Indians for a year. In 1795, Allen was part of a partnership with Charles Whitney, also of Vermont, Robert Randal, of Philadelphia and several British subjects in Detroit including John Askin and William Robertson, which planned to buy the entire lower Michigan peninsula from the United States government for $500,000. A stock company was established, and two of Allen's eastern partners promised members of Congress either stock or cash for their support in the purchase. This clumsy scheme was exposed, and the partner's plans evaporated.

== Death ==
Allen died in Burlington, Vermont, on March 26, 1806. He is interred at Elmwood Cemetery in Burlington.

== Family ==
Ebenezer Allen married Lydia Richards and they had eight children:

1. Abiel Allen (1763 in Poultney – 1765 in New Marlborough, MA)
2. Timothy Allen (1765 in Poultney – 1850 in South Hero)
3. Mary Allen (1766 in Vermont – ? in Vermont)
4. Lydia Allen (1768 in Poultney – 1800 in ?)
5. Ebenezer Allen Jr. (1771 in South Hero – July 2, 1844 in LaPorte, Indiana)
6. Amy Allen (1775 in Poultney – April 30, 1822 in South Hero)
7. Charlotte Allen (1777 in South Hero – September 13, 1813 in South Hero)
8. Eunice Allen (April 7, 1779 in Tinmouth – January 24, 1852 in Rome, Michigan)
