= Asa Lyon =

American politician

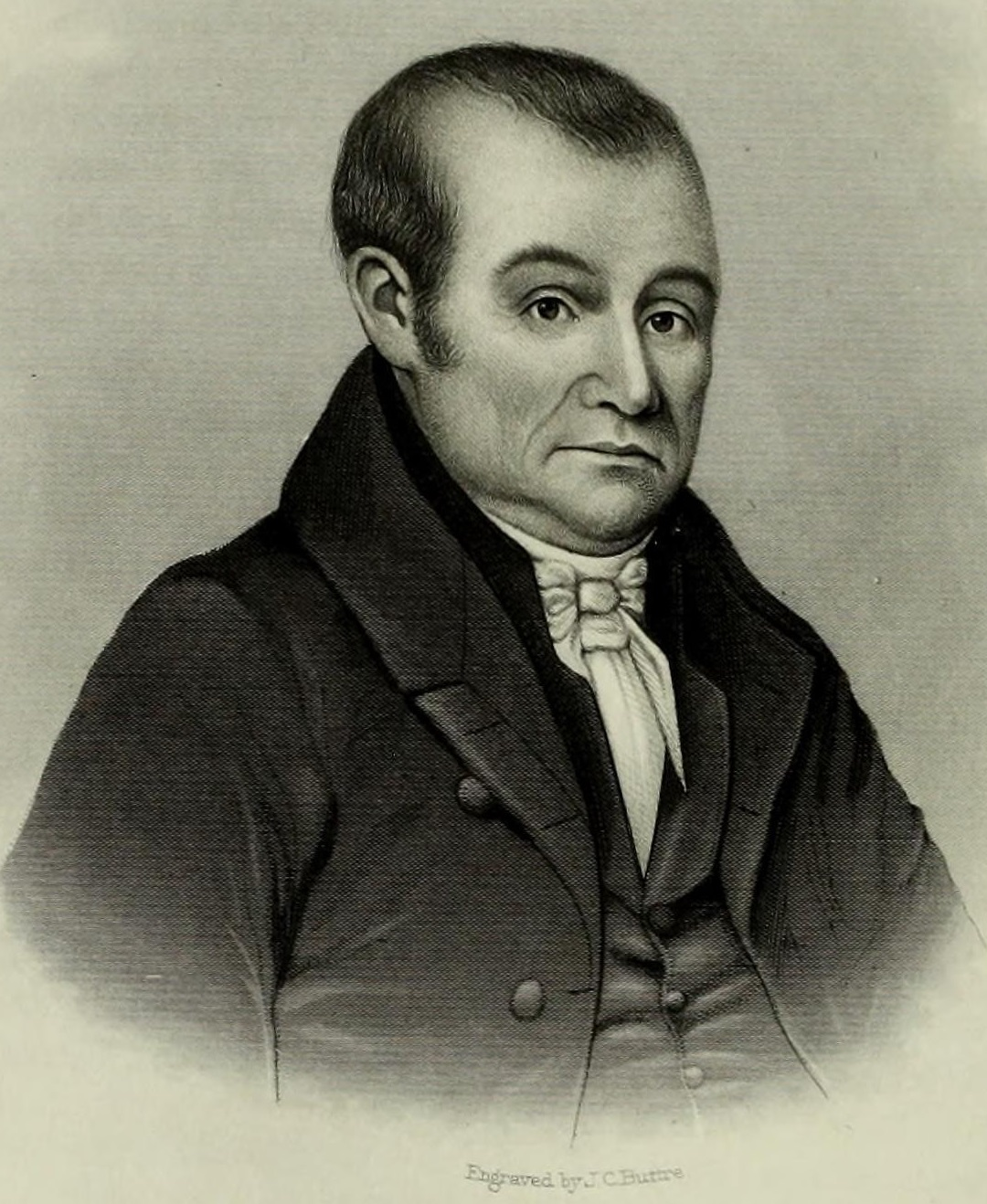

Member of the United States House of Representatives from Vermont's at-large district
- In office March 4, 1815 – March 3, 1817
- Preceded by: Charles Rich
- Succeeded by: Heman Allen

Member of the Vermont House of Representatives
- In office 1799-1802; 1804-1806; 1808

Personal details
- Born: December 31, 1763 Pomfret, Connecticut Colony, British America
- Died: April 4, 1841 (aged 77) South Hero, Vermont, U.S.
- Party: Federalist
- Spouse: Esther Newell Lyon
- Children: Esther Lyon, Abigail Lyon and Newell Lyon
- Education: Dartmouth College
- Profession: Politician, Pastor

Asa Lyon (December 31, 1763 – April 4, 1841) was an American politician. He served as a United States representative from Vermont.

== Biography ==
Lyon was born in Pomfret in the Connecticut Colony to Jonathan Lyon and Rebecca Maxley Lyon. He attended the common schools. He graduated from Dartmouth College in 1790. He was a divinity student with the Reverend Charles Backus in Somers, Connecticut. Lyon was ordained the pastor of the Congregational Church in Sunderland, Massachusetts, in 1792. He moved to South Hero, Vermont, in 1794 where he studied law. Lyon was also a tutor, and among his students was Herman R. Beardsley, who later served as a Justice of the Vermont Supreme Court

Lyon was a member of the Vermont House of Representatives from 1799 until 1802, 1804 until 1806 and 1808. He was a member of the Vermont Executive Council in 1808. Lyon was a town representative in Grande Isle from 1810 until 1813. He organized the church in South Hero and served as its first pastor from 1802 until 1840, and as chief judge of Grand Isle County Courts from 1805 until 1809, 1813 and 1814.

He was elected as a Federalist candidate to the Fourteenth United States Congress, serving from March 4, 1815, until March 3, 1817.

== Family life ==
Lyon married Esther Newell Lyon. They had three children, Esther Lyon, Abigail Lyon and Newell Lyon. Lyon was thought to be the second-cousin of Robert Burns, the Scottish poet and lyricist.

== Death ==
Lyon died in South Hero on April 4, 1841. He is interred at the Grand Isle Cemetery in Grand Isle, Vermont.

U.S. House of Representatives
Preceded by Charles Rich	Member of the U.S. House of Representatives from Vermont's at-large congressional district 1815-1817	Succeeded by Heman Allen
