= Heman A. White =

American attorney and politician from Vermont

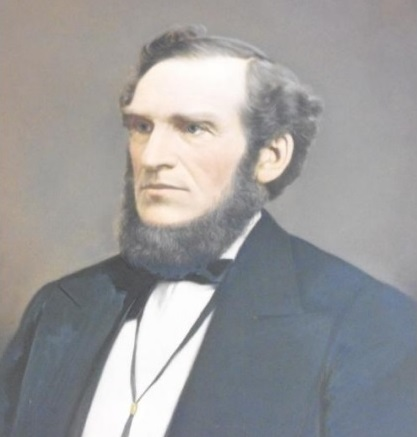
- Colorized version of illustration from 1894's Men of Vermont: An Illustrated Biographical History of Vermonters and Sons of Vermont

Member of the Vermont Senate from Orange County
- In office 1870–1872 Serving with Harry H. Niles
- Preceded by: Roswell Farnham; James Hutchinson Jr.
- Succeeded by: William R. Shedd; Lyman G. Hinckley

Member of the Vermont House of Representatives from Washington
- In office 1876–1878
- Preceded by: John A. Stanley
- Succeeded by: Warren Huntington
- In office 1863–1866
- Preceded by: Hiram Fellows
- Succeeded by: Lyman P. Barron
- In office 1857–1859
- Preceded by: Bether W. Bartholomew
- Succeeded by: Denison S. Bowles

State's Attorney of Orange County, Vermont
- In office 1866–1868
- Preceded by: Samuel M. Gleason
- Succeeded by: Samuel M. Gleason

Judge of Probate for Vermont's Randolph District
- In office 1856–1858
- Preceded by: John B. Hutchinson
- Succeeded by: William F. Dickinson

Town Clerk of Washington, Vermont
- In office 1848–1898
- Preceded by: John Colby
- Succeeded by: Miraette A. C. White

Personal details
- Born: September 21, 1817 Washington, Vermont
- Died: January 1, 1898 (aged 80) Washington, Vermont
- Resting place: Maple Hill Cemetery, Washington, Vermont
- Party: Whig (before 1854); Republican (from 1854)
- Spouse(s): Mary C. Spencer (1851-1855, her death); Miraette Ann Calef (m. 1861-1898, his death)
- Children: 1
- Education: Newbury Academy, Newbury, Vermont
- Profession: Attorney

Heman A. White (September 21, 1817 – January 1, 1898) was an American attorney and political figure from Vermont. A lifelong resident of Washington, Vermont, White was most notable for his long service as town clerk (1848-1898), probate judge of Orange County's Randolph district (1856-1858), state's attorney of Orange County (1866-1868), member of the Vermont House of Representatives from Washington (1857-1859, 1863-1866, 1876-1878), and member of the Vermont Senate from Orange County (1870-1872).

== Early life ==
Heman Allen White was born in Washington, Vermont on September 21, 1817, the youngest son of Thaddeus White (1759-1851) and Rebecca (Gleason) White (1774-1853). Thaddeus White, who was originally from Spencer, Massachusetts was a veteran of the American Revolution and one of the first settlers of Washington. He posted the public notice for the first town freemen's meeting in 1793 and at the meeting was chosen as one of the three highway surveyors. In 1794, Thaddeus White was chosen as the town's first member of the Vermont House of Representatives.

Heman White attended the schools of Washington and the academy in Newbury. He then studied law with attorney John Colby of Washington. White was admitted to the bar in 1843 and established a practice in Washington.

== Career ==
In addition to practicing law, White was involved in local politics and government. Originally a Whig, and a Republican from the time the party was founded in the mid 1850s, White served as Washington's town clerk from 1848 to 1898. After serving as register of probate for the Randolph district of Orange County from 1854 to 1856, White was elected to a two-year term as probate judge.

White went on to serve as state's attorney of Orange County from 1866 to 1868. He represented Washington in the Vermont House of Representatives on several occasions, including 1857 to 1859, 1863 to 1866, and 1876 to 1878. He also served one term (1870 to 1872) as a member of the Vermont Senate from Orange County.

== Death and burial ==
White died in Washington on January 1, 1898. He was buried in the Calef family lot at Maple Hill Cemetery in Washington.

== Family ==
In 1851, White married Mary C. Spencer (1831-1855). They were the parents of a daughter, Dora (1855-1883), who was the wife of Rolla G. Spafford. In 1861, White married Miraette Ann Calef (1830-1900). After his death, she was appointed to succeed him as town clerk.
