= Oreola Williams Haskell =

American author

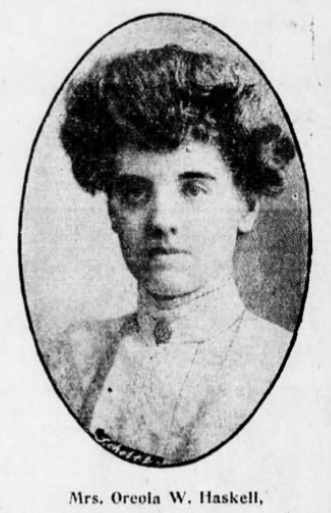
Oreola Williams Haskell, The Brooklyn Daily Eagle, Feb 3 1905

Oreola Williams Haskell (14 April 1875 – 6 September 1953) was an American activist for suffrage, author, and poet in the early twentieth century.

== Early life ==
Haskell was born to Theodore and Martha Williams in Poultney, Vermont, on April 14, 1875, and died in Brooklyn on September 6, 1953. The Williams family moved to Brooklyn when Haskell was around five years old, shortly before her brother was born.

=== Family ===
==== Martha J. (née Rees) Williams, mother (1854-1939) ====
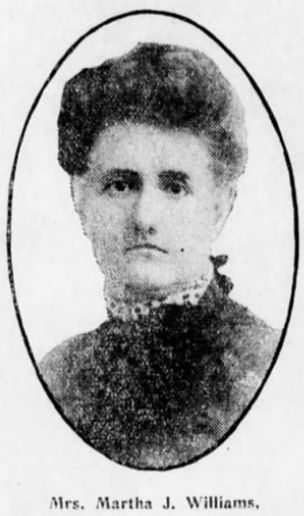
Martha J. Williams

Martha was herself a prominent pioneer suffragist who was very involved in her local suffrage community and society. She led, chaired, and participated in many suffrage organizations in New York City, as listed below:

- Charter member of the Interurban Woman Suffrage Council (est.1903), the first federation of suffrage clubs to be founded by Carrie Chapman Catt
- President of the Harlem Woman Suffrage League (also called the Harlem Equal Rights League)
- President of Kings County Political Equality League
- Press Chairman for several suffrage clubs
- Member of the New York Suffrage League
- Organizer for the New York Equal Rights Association
- Historian for the New York State Woman Suffrage Association
- Chairman of the Philanthropic Committee of the New York City Federation of Women's Clubs

There is also evidence that Martha worked with Oreola, and one example is Susan B. Anthony's Brooklyn birthday party press release. While Oreola represented the Elizabeth Cady Stanton Political Equality League and had the role of youth outreach, Martha was responsible for press relations. Due to the overlap in Martha and Oreola's leadership experience, it is likely that working alongside her mother gave her the experience and network to follow in her footsteps, at least to some degree.

==== Theodore Williams, father ====
Theodore was a journalist, editor and poet, and president of the Evolution Club of which Martha, Oreola, and Robert were all active members.

He wrote poetry under the pseudonym Tudor Williams, and edited for the Associated Press and Leslie's Weekly. Based on Oreola's publication records, it maybe possible that it was through her father's connections that she was published in Leslie's Weekly, rather than purely based on merit.

Harold Williams, brother (1879–)

Not much is known about Harold.

==== Robert Hutchins Haskell, husband (1874–1965) ====
Robert was born in Brooklyn on October 31, 1874, and met Oreola while they were both editing the Era at Cornell. After graduating university, he attended New York Law School while working as a journalist, and graduated in 1898. According to the Cornell Alumni News, he was a "war correspondent for the New York Herald." He became an attorney, and married Oreola on April 8, 1901, at the Unity Church in Brooklyn. He was the leader of the Farmer-Labor Party of Brooklyn. He died at age 90 in his home in St. Petersburg, Florida, on March 20, 1965, after retiring from practice in 1962.

==== Grace Vivian Haskell, daughter (1907–1999) ====
Grace was born on November 22, 1907, in New York. She married Hilmer N. Torner on Feb 23, 1954, in Elkton, Cecil, Maryland. She died on March 2, 1999, in Saint Petersburg, Pinellas, Florida, at age 91.

She helped her mother with some of her society work (specifically the Brooklyn Sittig Christmas Tree Society, which you can learn more about here), alongside Katheryn Beyea, but it is unclear whether she participated in her mother's suffrage activism. In her obituary, she is listed as a homemaker.

== Education ==
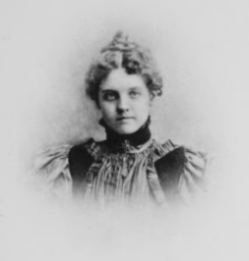
Oreola Williams Haskell, Cornell Yearbook (June 1897)

Haskell graduated the Girl's High School in Brooklyn NY and was named the Class Poet. At age 17, she founded and presided over the Oreola Progressive Society. She continued her education at Cornell and received a bachelor's degree in Philosophy. While at Cornell, Haskell was on the editorial boards for two student publications, the Era and the Magazine, and won a prize from the former. She was a member and Winter Term President of the Sennightly sorority and was named Class Poet by her peers

== Career and personal life ==
Until her later marriage with Robert H. Haskell, Haskell worked as a public school teacher in Brooklyn. Together they had a daughter, Grace Vivian Haskell. Haskell was a prolific author, writing her own novel (see Banner Bearers below) and contributing to magazines such as Judge regularly. Haskell was devoted to the suffrage cause, and worked alongside famous suffragists such as Carrie Chapman Catt and Mary Garrett Hay. Ida Husted Harper, who wrote the introduction to Banner Bearers, commended her for her modesty and lack of interest in the limelight, which was very much in line with the self-sacrificing attitude that Haskell attributed to suffragists in her works. Her quiet, efficient, hardworking attitude was also noted in an interview she had with the Brooklyn Daily Eagle in 1915, as a prime example of the faceless army of diligent suffragists who worked behind the scenes. Alongside her suffrage activism and high society work (predominantly philanthropy), she was an auditor and recording secretary of the New York Federation for Women's Clubs, and as of 1914 she was the patroness of the Brooklyn Sittig Christmas Tree Society. Though her contributions to the suffrage movement in New York have not garnered much attention from historians, her plethora of appearances in the Brooklyn Daily Eagle newspaper suggest that she was a well-known and respected figure of the time.

Haskell was a Unitarian, and her hobbies were theater, outdoor sports, and walking.

== Works ==
=== Book ===
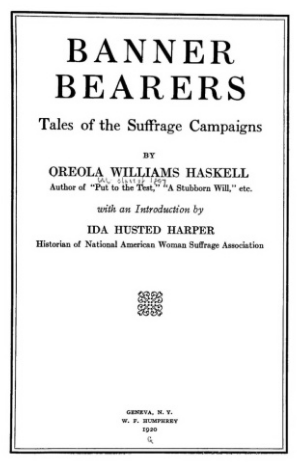
Banner Bearers

- Banner Bearers: tales of the Suffrage Campaigns, with an introduction by Ida Husted Harper (Geneva, N.Y.: W. F. Humphrey, 1920)
  - As a fictional work that exemplified the modernist literary movement of the time, Banner Bearers was possibly the first epistolary style novel in suffrage literature. The novel was inspired by the suffrage referendums in New York between 1915 and 1917, and its depictions of that time have been praised and credited by suffragists as greatly influential in the passing of the Nineteenth Amendment. The twenty-two different yet related voices in the novel provide a more complex, diverse representation of suffragist voices, making it a more mature depiction of the successes and failures of the suffrage movement.
  - Haskell modeled many of the twenty-two characters on actual suffragists, and as the Daily Brooklyn Eagle revealed in its review of the book, the true identities may have been obvious to contemporaries of the novel (which suggests the book was possibly meant to be an inside joke). According to the article, the stories and corresponding identities are as follows:
    - "Mrs. Rensling Takes a Rest" - Mrs. George Notman
    - "Tenements and Teacups" - Mrs. Emilie Lockwood
    - "A Musical Martyr" - Mrs. Anna Ross Weeks
    - "Sizing Up a Boss" - Mary Garrett Hay (known affectionately as "boss")
    - "The Heart of a Chief" - Carrie Chapman Catt.
  - Other identities revealed in the article that are not accompanied by story title are: Mrs. Norman de B. Whitehouse, Dr. Anna Howard Shaw, Mrs. F. Louis Slade (Mrs. Caroline McCormick Slade), Mrs. Charles L. Tiffany, and Miss Rose Schneidermann.

=== Periodical publications (non-exhaustive) ===
==== Poems ====
Among other publications, Haskell contributed poems relating to aspects of city life to the Judge, Leslie's Weekly, McCall's, The Club Woman magazine, and the Housekeeper.

- “The Suffragist,” Woman’s Journal, 32 (26 Oct 1901): 342.
- “The Yellow Ribbon,” Woman’s Journal, 33 (7 June 1902): 182.
- “The City’s Roots,” The Globe (1844-1936); Toronto, Ont. [Toronto, Ont] 10 Apr 1912: 6.
- “Her Way,” Judge, 68 (16 Jan 1915): 2.
- “The New Flag,” Judge, 68 (20 March 1915): 270.
- “Placing Her,” Judge, 68 (17 April 1915): 346.
- “The Button,” Judge, 68 (15 May 1915): 443.
- “Her Brooch,” Judge, 68 (19 June 1915): 566.
- “The Woman Asks,” Judge, 68 (26 June 1915):592.
- “Cooks and Character,” Judge, 69 (3 July 1915): xxviii.
- “Her Voice,” Judge, 69 (17 July 1915): ixxx.
- “Her Mind,” Judge, 69 (21 August 1915): 120.
- “The Subway,” The New York Times,14 Jun 1929: 18.

==== Fiction ====
The "Aunt Betsey" stories were written for Haskell's column in Judge, in a country vernacular. In every piece, she encounters an anti-suffragist, and converts them to her cause over the course of the vignette.

- "Aunt Betsey on Suffrage: The Back Door," Judge, 68 (30 January 1915): 78.
- "Aunt Betsey on Suffrage: Heads and Foots," Judge, 68 (13 February 1915): 126.
- "Aunt Betsey on Suffrage: Women's Needs," Judge, 68 (20 February 1915): 152.
- "Aunt Betsey on Suffrage: Peaks and Plains," Judge, 68 (27 February 1915): 175.
- "Aunt Betsey on Suffrage: The Trusting Tillies," Judge, 68 (13 March 1915): 222.
- "Aunt Betsey--Feminist: Candles and Electrics," Judge, 68 (20 March 1915): 245.
- "Aunt Betsey on Suffrage -- Some Queer Ones," Judge, 68 (3 April 1915): 294–295.
- "Aunt Betsey, Feminist: Fighting and Females," Judge, 68 (10 April 1915): 318.
- "Betsey Burrows, Suffragist--Wimmen and Hum," Judge, 68 (24 April 1915): 372–373.
- "Betsey Burrows--Suffragist: Pertection," Judge, 68 (29 May 1915): 489–490.
- "Betsey Burrows, Suffragist: Kids," Judge, 69 (3 July 1915): xxviii-xxvix.
- "Betsey Burrows, Suffragist: Husbands," Judge, 69 (31 July 1915): 41.

=== Drama ===
- Put to the Test (1906)
  - Plays like Haskell's were published in the wave of rising popularity of pro-suffrage pageantry and plays, even before the NAWSA compiled catalogues to make the scripts more accessible for purchase. These plays often emphasized the expediency of giving women the vote, and Haskell's own play, Put to the Test, ridiculed the anti-suffragists’ “indirect influence” argument that purported the redundancy of the woman's vote because of her moral influence and guidance towards her family.
  - As a comedy with action and cultural relevance, Put to the Test succeeded financially and critically.

=== Theater productions ===
- Put to the Test, New York, Long Island Business College, May 3, 1905
  - Local suffragists were cast in the play, as the play was produced by the Stanton League. It was such a success that Haskell could not meet the demand for scripts for it alone. As a result, the play was published for public access in the Woman's Journal over three issues, between January 6 and January 20.
- A Stubborn Will, Manhattan, Hotel Martha Washington, December 10, 1909
  - This play was less successful than Put to the Test, but was performed numerous times; other than its first appearance noted above, it was performed on February 15, 1910, at a public meeting, and again on March 18 of the same year at the chapel of the Church of Our Father (sponsored by the People's Political Equality League). No record of the play's publication has been found, possibly because Haskell was able to meet the individual demands for copies on her own, unlike the case with her former play.

According to Woman’s Who’s Who of America: A Biographical Dictionary of Contemporary Women of the United States and Canada 1914-1915, Haskell was the author of not two, but three suffrage plays. Additionally, one of her plays was apparently translated into Norwegian and played in Norway, but like its previous claim, this was not explained in further detail.

=== Non-fiction ===
- "To Enrolment Chairmen," Woman's Journal, 39 (10 October 1908): 163.
- "Canvassing for the Cause," Woman's Journal, 43 (13 January 1912): 10–11.
- "The New Wife," Woman Voter, 2 (January 1912): 10–11.
- "The Grown-Up Woman," Federation Bulletin, 14 (1915): 14, 23.
- "The Interests of American Women," International Women's News, 17 (1922): 30–31.
- "Carrie Chapman Catt," Today's Housewife, 19 (April 1923): 8.

=== Writing as an activist ===
- “New York City Campaigns” in History of Woman Suffrage, 6 volumes, edited by Ida Husted Harper (New York: National American Woman Suffrage Association, 1922), VI: 459–468.
- 1922-1923 regularly appeared in International Women's News on topics concerning women.

== Activism ==
=== Leadership ===
Source===

- Elizabeth Cady Stanton club (Aka Elizabeth Cady Stanton Political Equality League)
  - President, Oct 22, 1901-1903 (elected the week of May 18, 1901)
  - Vice President on Oct 11, 1928, when she wrote a memorial piece on Mary Garrett Hay after her death. Day of appointment and resignation unknown.
- Interurban Woman Suffrage Council
  - Possible Co-Head alongside Mary Garrett Hay
- People's Political Equality League
  - President in 1914. Day of appointment and resignation unknown.
- Kings County Political Equality League
  - President, newly appointed on June 12, 1907
- 18th Assembly Dist[rict] of Woman Suffrage Party
  - Leader in 1914. Day of appointment and resignation unknown.
- Various chairmanships in State National Suffrage organizations
  - Chairman of the City Woman Suffrage Party

=== Membership (non-exhaustive) ===
- Flatbush Political Equal Suffrage League
- Kings County Political Equality League
