= Poultney (town), Vermont =

Poultney, Vermont
- Town
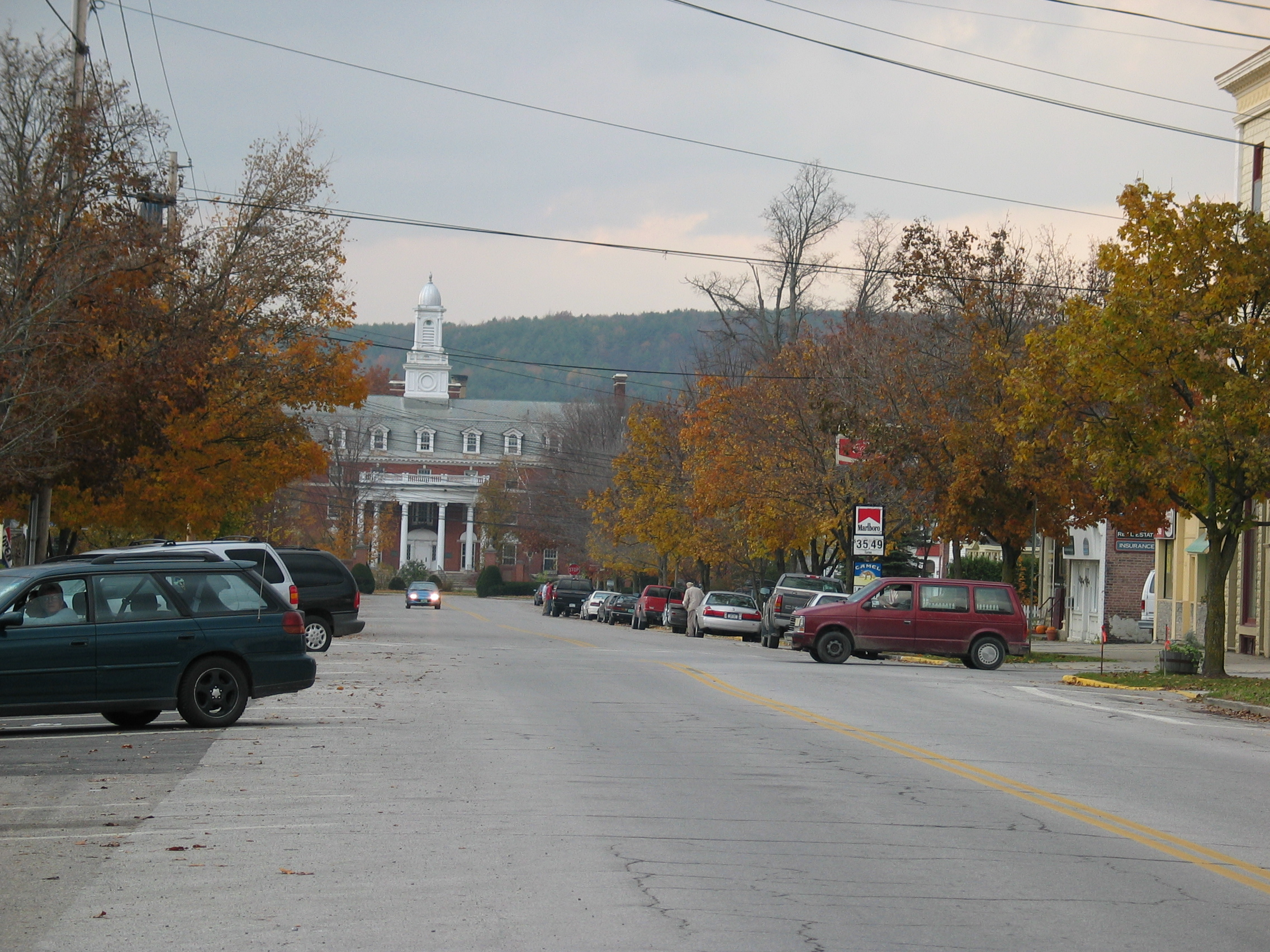
- Street in Poultney

- Logo
- Motto: "Heart of the Slate Valley"
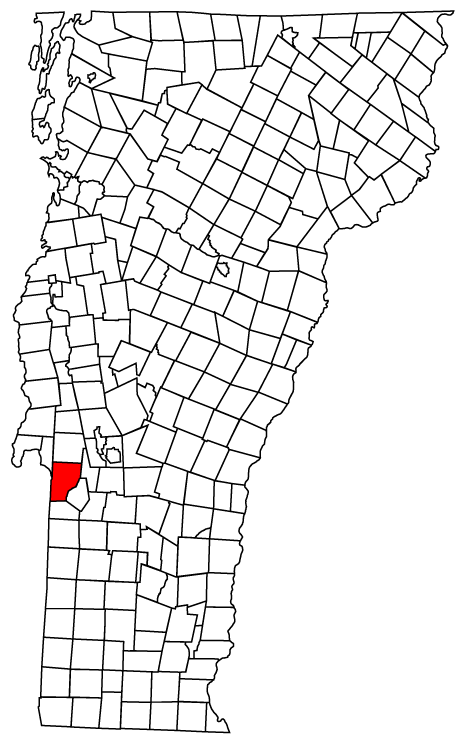
- Poultney, Vermont
- Coordinates: 43°31′50″N 73°10′26″W
- Country: United States
- State: Vermont
- County: Rutland
- Chartered: 1761; 265 years ago
- Communities: Poultney; East Poultney; Gorhamtown; South Poultney

Area
  - Total: 45 sq mi (116 km^{2})
  - Land: 44 sq mi (114 km^{2})
  - Water: 0.89 sq mi (2.3 km^{2})
- Elevation: 568 ft (173 m)

Population (2020)
  - Total: 3,020
  - Density: 68.6/sq mi (26.5/km^{2})
- Time zone: UTC-5 (Eastern (EST))
  - Summer (DST): UTC-4 (EDT)
- ZIP Codes: 05764 (Poultney); 05774 (Wells)
- Area code: 802
- FIPS code: 50-56875
- GNIS feature ID: 1462178
- Website: www.poultneyvt.gov

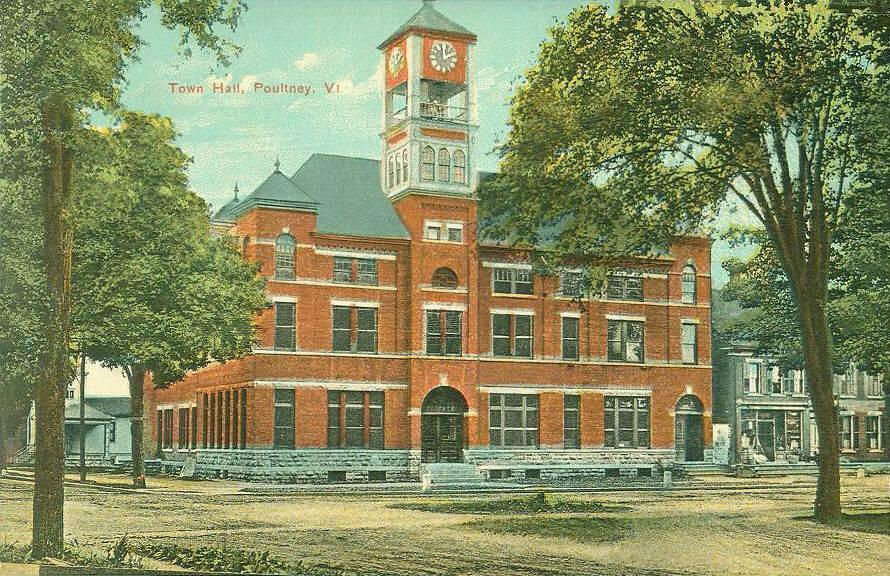
Town Hall, c. 1910

Poultney is a town in Rutland County in the southwestern part of the U.S. state of Vermont. New York is on its western border. Castleton, Vermont, is on its northern border. Poultney was home to Green Mountain College, a private liberal arts college that closed in 2019. The Village of Poultney is entirely within the town. The town population was 3,020 at the 2020 census.

Poultney was charted on September 21, 1761, named for William Pulteney, 1st Earl of Bath, a British politician and orator. Bath was the founder of the political faction known as the Patriot Whigs, in opposition to the government of Robert Walpole.

== History ==
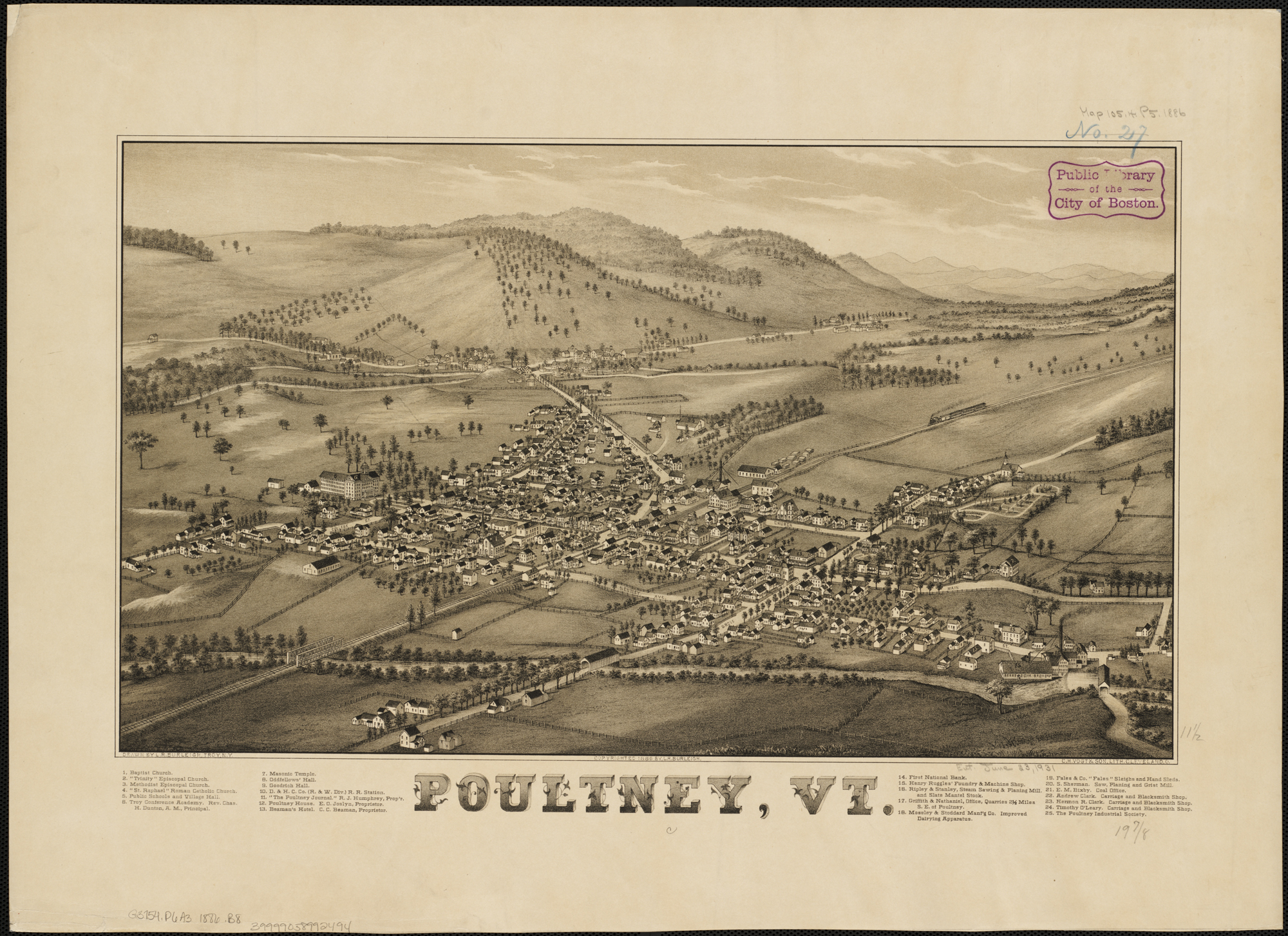
Print of Poultney from 1886 by L.R. Burleigh with list of sights

One of the New Hampshire Grants, Poultney was charted on September 21, 1761, by Benning Wentworth, Royal Governor of New Hampshire, and named for William Pulteney, 1st Earl of Bath, a British politician and orator.

Poultney was first settled by Thomas Ashley and Ebenezer Allen. Ashley married Zeruiah Richards, and Allen married Lydia Richards, both daughters of Zebulon Richards of Windham County, Connecticut. Ashley and Allen established themselves in a cabin near the Poultney River on February 15, 1771. Allen brought his family with him, and a son born to his wife Lydia in 1772 was the first white child born in Poultney. Ashley built a shanty and planted corn before bringing his family to Poultney; he returned with his family in the fall of 1771. Six of Ashley’s brothers followed him to Poultney during the next two years, and several members of the Richards family were also early settlers.

The town grew slowly at first because of the unresolved conflict between New York and New Hampshire over land ownership in Vermont. The Great List of Freemen in Poultney in 1781 contains the names of only 88 men. Most of the early settlers of the town came from Connecticut and Massachusetts.

All but one of the males in Poultney were supporters of the American Revolution, and most served in the army at various times during the American Revolutionary War. In 1777, Poultney was threatened with invasion by the British, and the men of Poultney left to answer the call to arms. The women and children of Poultney fled the town on July 8, 1777, in the face of Gen. John Burgoyne's army, which was advancing from the north. Most families returned to their former Massachusetts and Connecticut houses during this period of unrest. After Burgoyne's defeat, the villagers returned to Poultney during spring of the following year.

Ebenezer Allen left Poultney in March 1783 for South Hero, where he once again was the first settler in wilderness. Thomas Ashley remained in the house he built in Poultney until his death in 1810. He was a justice of the peace and a representative to the Vermont General Assembly six times between 1787 and 1801.

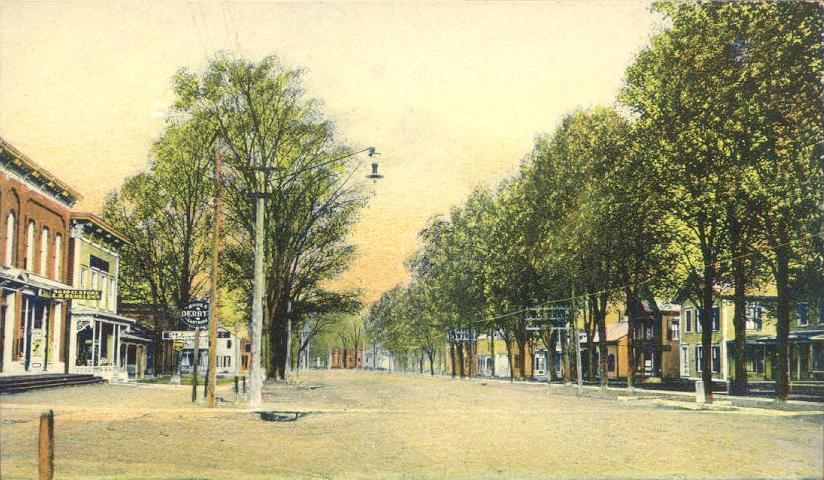
Lower Main Street c. 1906

A grist mill was built in 1777, and the village grew up around this mill. Many buildings of historic interest are in East Poultney. Among these are the Eagle Tavern dating to 1780, the Federal style Baptist church built in 1805 by master builder Elisha Scott, and the 1823 Horace Greeley House.

East Poultney was the original home of Heman Allen, brother of Ebenezer Allen and cousin of Revolutionary War hero Ethan Allen. Horace Greeley, founder of the New York Tribune, and George Jones, co-founder of The New York Times, both lived in East Poultney in the late 1820s. Greeley served an apprenticeship at the Northern Spectator newspaper owned by Amos Bliss from 1826 to 1830. The green and nearby streets look very similar to the way they were in the 1800s.

In the last half of the 19th century, slate became a major export from the region. This attracted immigrants from many countries, including Wales. Lack of social mobility, experience in processing slate, and a depressed economy in Wales encouraged many Welsh slate workers to come to the Poultney region. Anecdotal evidence suggests that many of the Welsh last name in the area are pronounced using the original Welsh pronunciation. The choir at Green Mountain College was said to have the only fully Welsh repertoire in the United States.

The East Poultney Historic District and the Poultney Village Historic District are both listed in the National Register of Historic Places. Among historical buildings located there are the Union Academy dating to 1791, the Melodeon Factory built in 1840, and the 1896 Victorian school house.

Poultney shares Lake St. Catherine (about 800 acres (320 ha)) with the town of Wells. Poultney lies in a slate belt, where slate roofing, tiles, and building blocks are mined and milled.

== Geography ==
According to the United States Census Bureau, the town has a total area of 44.8 square miles (116 km^{2}), of which 0.9 sq mi (2.3 km^{2}), or 1.94%, is covered by water. Situated to the west of the Taconic Mountains, Poultney is drained by the Poultney River, a tributary of Lake Champlain.

The town is crossed by Vermont Route 30, Vermont Route 31, and Vermont Route 140. The village of Poultney is located entirely within the town.

== Demographics ==
Historical population
Census	Pop.	Note	%±
1790	1,121		—
1800	1,694		51.1%
1810	1,905		12.5%
1820	1,955		2.6%
1830	1,909		−2.4%
1840	1,880		−1.5%
1850	2,329		23.9%
1860	2,278		−2.2%
1870	2,836		24.5%
1880	2,717		−4.2%
1890	3,031		11.6%
1900	3,108		2.5%
1910	3,644		17.2%
1920	2,868		−21.3%
1930	3,215		12.1%
1940	2,781		−13.5%
1950	2,936		5.6%
1960	3,009		2.5%
1970	3,217		6.9%
1980	3,196		−0.7%
1990	3,498		9.4%
2000	3,633		3.9%
2010	3,432		−5.5%
2020	3,020		−12.0%
U.S. Decennial Census

As of the 2000 census, 3,633 people, 1,287 households, and 845 families were residing in the town. The population density was 82.7 people per square mile (31.9/km^{2}). The 1,673 housing units had an average density of 38.1 per square mile (14.7/km^{2}). The racial makeup of the town was 97.16% White, 0.69% African American, 0.47% Native American, 0.88% Asian, 0.25% from other races, and 0.55% from two or more races. Hispanics or Latinos of any race were 0.58% of the population.

Of the 1,287 households, 29.2% had children under 18 living with them, 52.0% were married couples living together, 9.6% had a female householder with no husband present, and 34.3% were not families. About 27.8% of all households were made up of individuals, and 12.9% had someone living alone who was 65 or older. The average household size was 2.39 and the average family size was 2.92.

In the town, the age distribution was 21.1% under 18, 17.6% from 18 to 24, 25.0% from 25 to 44, 20.3% from 45 to 64, and 16.0% who were 65 or older. The median age was 36 years. For every 100 females, there were 96.4 males. For every 100 females 18 and over, there were 94.7 males.

The median income for a household in the town was $31,711 and for a family was $40,556. Males had a median income of $31,148 versus $25,303 for females. The per capita income for the town was $14,963. About 6.3% of families and 9.3% of the population were below the poverty line, including 7.7% of those under 18 and 6.7% of those 65 or over.

== Notable people ==
- Amsale Aberra, Ethiopian-born American fashion designer and entrepreneur
- Ebenezer Allen (1743–1806), founder of Poultney
- Heman Allen (1779–1852), US congressman
- Jeffrey Brace (1742–1827), American Revolutionary War soldier, farmer, author, and first African-American citizen of Poultney, Vermont
- Oliver Cowdery (1806–1850), leader in the Latter Day Saint movement
- William Duell, actor and singer
- Richie Grant, soccer coach
- Horace Greeley (1811–1872), presidential candidate and US congressman
- Oreola Williams Haskell (1875–1953), suffrage activist, author, and poet
- David G. Hooker (1830–1888), mayor of Milwaukee, Wisconsin
- George Jones (1811–1891), co-founder of The New York Times
- Marcellus Jones (1830–1900), Civil War soldier
- William Miller (1782–1849), American Baptist preacher (Millerite movement)
- Edward H. Ripley, businessman and Union Army officer in the Civil War
- William Y. W. Ripley, Union Army officer in the Civil War and recipient of the Medal of Honor
- George E. Royce, American businessman and banker
- Ethan Smith (1762–1849), Congregationalist clergyman and author of View of the Hebrews
- Terry Williams (b. 1952), member of the Vermont Senate
- John E. Woodward (1870–1944), U.S. Army brigadier general
