= Washington, Vermont =

- Town
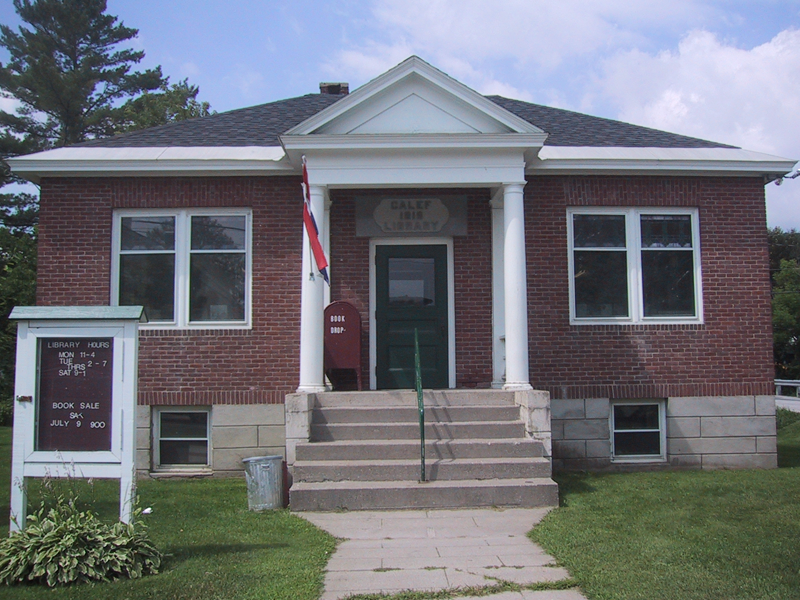
- Calef Library in Washington

- Wordmark

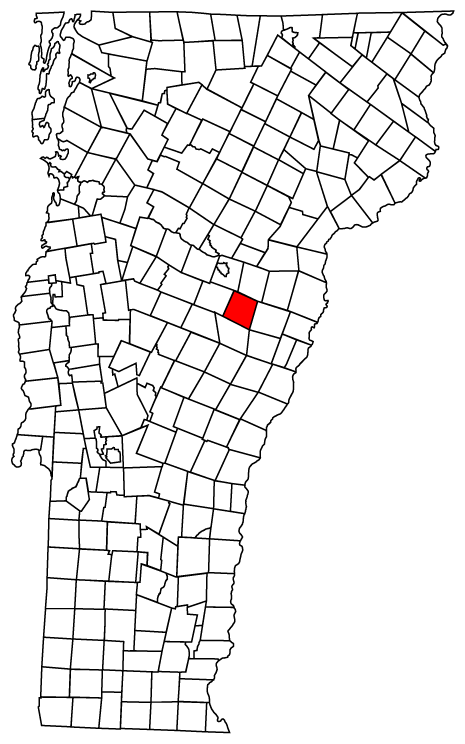
- Washington, Vermont
- Coordinates: 44°05′30″N 72°26′19″W
- Country: United States
- State: Vermont
- County: Orange
- Communities: Washington; South Washington; Washington Heights

Area
  - Total: 38.9 sq mi (100.7 km^{2})
  - Land: 38.8 sq mi (100.6 km^{2})
  - Water: 0 sq mi (0.0 km^{2})
- Elevation: 1,962 ft (598 m)

Population (2020)
  - Total: 1,032
  - Density: 27/sq mi (10.3/km^{2})
- Time zone: UTC-5 (Eastern (EST))
  - Summer (DST): UTC-4 (EDT)
- ZIP Codes: 05675 (Washington); 05038 (Chelsea); 05086 (West Topsham); 05641 (Barre); 05654 (Graniteville); 05679 (Williamstown)
- Area code: 802
- FIPS code: 50-76750
- GNIS feature ID: 1462243
- Website: washingtonvt.org

Washington is a town in Orange County, Vermont, in the United States. The population was 1,032 at the 2020 census. The town is believed to be named after George Washington, although the town may also be named after Washington, Connecticut, as there are records of individuals moving from that town in Connecticut to Vermont around 1766.

== History ==
During the 1760s and 1770s, the territory now known as Vermont was in dispute between New York and New Hampshire, the result of conflicting interpretations of each colony's charter. People moving into the territory, then known as New Connecticut or the New Hampshire Grants, generally settled after purchasing land grants from New Hampshire governor Benning Wentworth. When the British government resolved the dispute in New York's favor, New York attempted to assert control by forcing residents who had purchased grants from Wentworth to pay a fee to confirm their titles, otherwise face eviction. Many Vermonters resisted, leading to creation of the Green Mountain Boys.

As part of New York's effort to demonstrate control over the grants, in 1770 it chartered the town of Kingsland far from New York in what was then remote Gloucester County. Kingsland had no record of any residents, but was designated as one of two county seats. A log jail and courthouse were constructed at the head of a stream subsequently named the Jail Branch.

In 1780, the government of Vermont, by then an independent republic, re-chartered Kingsland and named it Washington. The town was uninhabited until 1785, when Daniel Morse obtained title to 100 acres. He was soon followed by his brother, John. Other residents continued to arrive, and by 1792, the town was completely organized, with records for 1794 indicating that there were 32 freemen on its voter checklist.

Centered on the hilltop near the Jail Branch, the town consisted mainly of small sheep farms that produced wool. Between 1820 and 1829, there were two fulling mills and one carding mill in operation, and sheep raising peaked around 1830. Washington's population peaked at 1400 in 1840, after which there was a steady decline, as wool production decreased due to increasing tariffs and other factors. Most farms and homes around the center of town on the hilltop were abandoned, and the center of town relocated downhill and further north, along the Jail Branch and what is now Vermont Route 110.

With the arrival of the railroad in the 1850s, the dairy industry expanded as urban markets became accessible. By 1895, Washington had enough dairy farms to make the operation of a creamery possible. As industries including granite manufacturing grew in nearby towns, the expansion and railroads associated with it bypassed Washington, which remained a low-population rural community centered on agriculture.

By the late twentieth century, small dairy farms were increasingly uncompetitive, and by the 1950s, many of Washington's farms had ceased operation. By 1960, Washington's population had declined to 565. Although Washington remains a rural town, most farms are no longer in operation, and it has become a "bedroom community" with residents commuting to work in Barre, Montpelier, Burlington and other cities.

== Geography ==
According to the United States Census Bureau, the town has a total area of 38.9 square miles (100.7 km^{2}), of which 38.9 square miles (100.6 km^{2}) is land and 0.03% is water.

Washington is situated south of U.S. Route 302. Adjacent towns are Barre Town to the northwest, Orange to the north, Corinth to the east, Chelsea to the south, and Williamstown to the west.

== Demographics ==
Historical population
Census	Pop.	Note	%±
1790	72		—
1800	500		594.4%
1810	1,040		108.0%
1820	1,160		11.5%
1830	1,374		18.4%
1840	1,359		−1.1%
1850	1,348		−0.8%
1860	1,249		−7.3%
1870	1,113		−10.9%
1880	922		−17.2%
1890	820		−11.1%
1900	820		0.0%
1910	762		−7.1%
1920	660		−13.4%
1930	697		5.6%
1940	730		4.7%
1950	650		−11.0%
1960	565		−13.1%
1970	667		18.1%
1980	855		28.2%
1990	937		9.6%
2000	1,047		11.7%
2010	1,039		−0.8%
2020	1,032		−0.7%
U.S. Decennial Census

As of the census of 2020, there were 1,032 people, 522 households, and 371 families residing in the town. There were 557 housing units (of which 442 were occupied and 115 vacant). The racial makeup of the town was 91.38% White alone, 0.68% African American alone, 0.48% Native American alone, 0.58% Asian alone, 0.78% from other races, and 4.84% from two or more races. Hispanic or Latino of any race were 1.26% of the population.

As of the census of 2000, there were 1,047 people, 406 households, and 291 families residing in the town. The population density was 26.9 people per square mile (10.4/km^{2}). There were 528 housing units at an average density of 13.6 per square mile (5.2/km^{2}). The racial makeup of the town was 97.23% White, 0.48% African American, 0.19% Asian, 0.29% from other races, and 1.81% from two or more races. Hispanic or Latino of any race were 0.67% of the population.

There were 406 households, out of which 34.2% had children under the age of 18 living with them, 59.4% were married couples living together, 7.9% had a female householder with no husband present, and 28.1% were non-families. 20.4% of all households were made up of individuals, and 7.4% had someone living alone who was 65 years of age or older. The average household size was 2.58 and the average family size was 3.00.

In the town, the population was spread out, with 25.6% under the age of 18, 5.9% from 18 to 24, 30.2% from 25 to 44, 28.9% from 45 to 64, and 9.4% who were 65 years of age or older. The median age was 39 years. For every 100 females, there were 104.9 males. For every 100 females age 18 and over, there were 100.8 males.

The median income for a household in the town was $43,125, and the median income for a family was $50,500. Males had a median income of $29,674 versus $28,333 for females. The per capita income for the town was $18,439. About 3.1% of families and 6.1% of the population were below the poverty line, including 3.8% of those under age 18 and 11.3% of those age 65 or over.

== Notable people ==
- Donald Milne, member and clerk of the Vermont House of Representatives
- Marion Milne, member of the Vermont House of Representatives
- Scott Milne, Republican nominee for governor in 2014, U.S. Senator in 2016, and lieutenant governor in 2020
- Daniel Peaslee, Vermont legislator, judge, and member of the governor's executive council
- Carl C. Pope, Wisconsin legislator and jurist, born in Washington
- Heman A. White, member of the Vermont House of Representatives and Vermont Senate
