= Samuel Larned =

American merchant and diplomat (1788–1846)

Samuel Larned (June 22, 1788 – December 10, 1846) was an American merchant and diplomat from Providence, Rhode Island. Born on June 22, 1788, Larned's father was Samuel Larned and his grandfather was William Larned. Before 1820, he served at Cádiz, Spain. as U.S. consul and merchant. He returned to Rhode Island in 1820. He was appointed to the secretary of legation to Chile by President James Monroe in 1823. He served as the second United States minister plenipotentiary to Chile from 1828 to 1829. He served as the United States minister plenipotentiary to Peru from 1828 to 1837. He was also the chargé d'affaires to Bolivia beginning in 1828. During his 23 years as a diplomat, he settled conflicts between countries, navigated wars and revolutions, negotiated treaties, and ensured the rights of Americans and their property.

On October 1, 1837, Larned married Katharine Celia Greene (1816-1887), the daughter of Albert Collins Greene. Their daughter, Katharine Celia Larned was born in 1840. Larned died on December 10, 1846. Katharine married Judge Richard Ward Greene, her father's cousin, in 1851. Katharine died in 1887.
