= Charles Ransom Miller =

American newspaper editor (1849–1922)

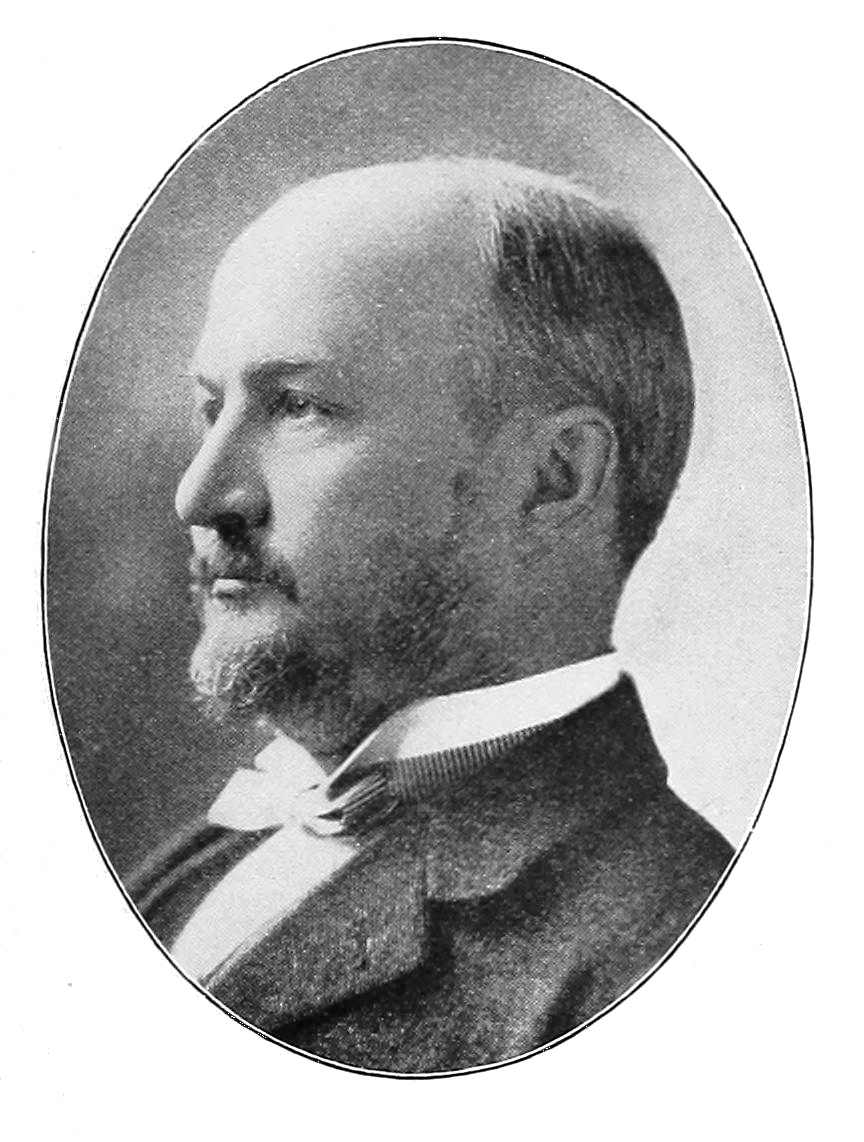
- Born: January 17, 1849; Hanover, New Hampshire, U.S.
- Died: July 18, 1922 (aged 73)
- Education: Dartmouth College
- Occupations: Journalist; editor
- Spouse: Frances Daniels (m. 1876)

Charles Ransom Miller (January 17, 1849 – July 18, 1922) was an editor-in-chief of The New York Times. He was born in Hanover, New Hampshire, to Elijah and Chastina Hoyt Miller. Miller attended Dartmouth College and graduated in 1872. After working at the Springfield Republican, the New York Times hired him on July 7, 1875. Miller became the editor-in-chief of The New York Times when he was 34, and would remain in that position for the rest of his life (about forty years).

== Biography ==
Miller was born on January 17, 1849, in Hanover, New Hampshire, to Elijah and Chastina Hoyt Miller. He attended Dartmouth College and graduated in 1872. While in college, he had planned to teach Latin, but upon graduation he found employment at the Springfield Republican. At the paper he was mentored by Samuel Bowles. Miller left that paper after around three years and was hired on July 7, 1875, by the New York Times as an assistant to the telegraph editor. In that position he helped handle news that came in over the telegraph. After some time Miller rose to be placed in charge of the weekly edition of The New York Times, which was eventually shut down.

After the weekly edition was shut down, Miller was made foreign exchange editor. He began sporadically contributing editorials, and joined the editorial staff officially in 1881. In 1883 he was made editor in chief of The New York Times after John Foord left. As editor-in-chief, he had the paper support Grover Cleveland's administration; the two men became friends. When George Jones, an owner and founder of the paper died, the paper was put up for sale. Miller led the creation of a syndicate, the New York Times Publishing Company, which purchased the paper on April 13, 1903. He eventually oversaw the sale of the paper to Adolph Ochs. Miller was retained as editor-in-chief and remained a major shareholder in the paper.

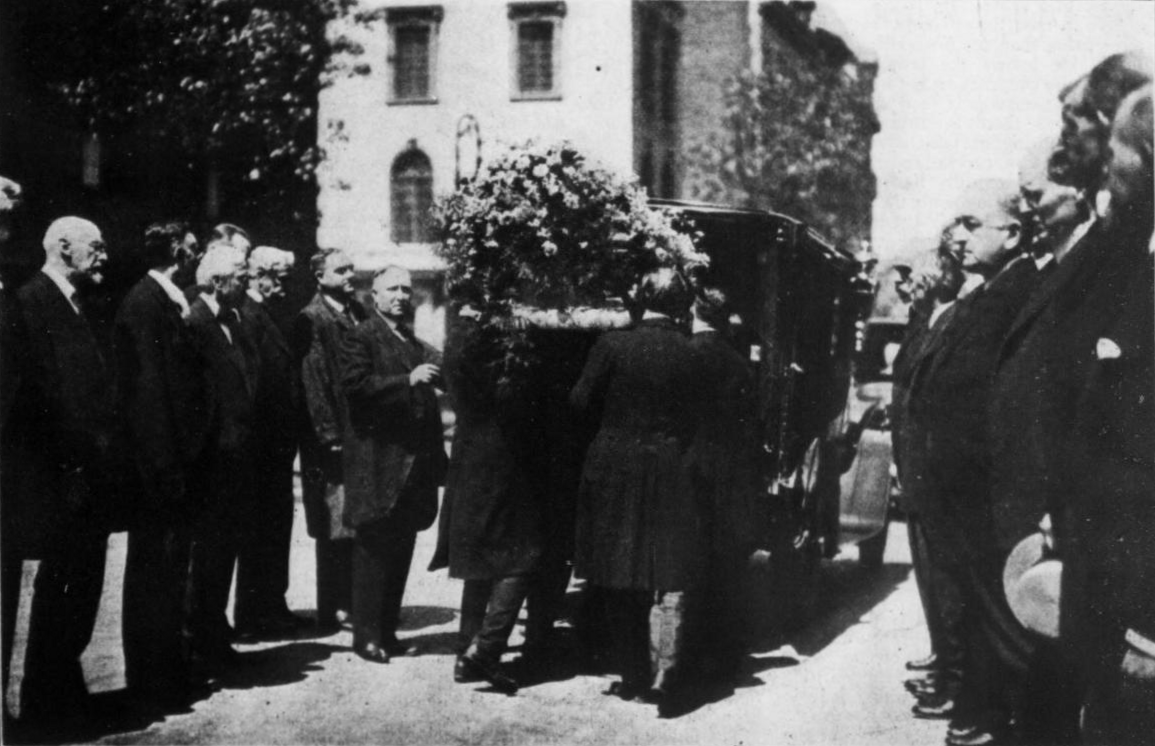
Funeral procession of Miller

Miller defended freedom of the press before an investigatory committee in the United States Senate. He spoke several languages and received honorary degrees from Dartmouth and Columbia University. On October 10, 1876, he married Frances Daniels. Miller died on July 18, 1922.
