= George Jones (publisher) =

American journalist (1811–1891)

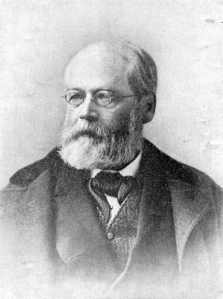
- Jones, c. 1869–1891
- Born: August 16, 1811; Poultney, Vermont, U.S.
- Died: August 12, 1891 (aged 79); South Poland, Maine, U.S.
- Burial place: Sleepy Hollow Cemetery
- Occupations: Journalist, banker
- Known for: Founding The New York Times
- Spouse: Sarah Maris Gilbert (m. 1826)
- Children: 4

George Jones (August 16, 1811 – August 12, 1891) was an American journalist who, with Henry Jarvis Raymond, co-founded the New-York Daily Times, now The New York Times.

== Biography ==
Jones was born in 1811 in Poultney, Vermont, and moved to Granville, Ohio, for a time. He moved back to Vermont after his parents died. Jones was employed at the Northern Spectator.

By 1833, he had moved to Troy, New York, working in dry goods, and later in banking. After spending a few years in the area that would later become New York City, he moved to and became a banker in Albany, New York. In Troy, on October 26, 1826, he married Sarah Maris Gilbert, daughter of Benjamin J. Gilbert, the leading merchant at the time of Troy. They had four children, Emma, Elizabeth, Mary and their only son, Gilbert.

He and Raymond issued the first issue of the New-York Daily Times on September 18, 1851. The two had first become acquainted while working at the New-York Tribune under Horace Greeley. Jones solicited funds to begin the newspaper, earning contributions from investors in Albany and Aurora, including Edwin B. Morgan, as well supplying $25,000 ($968,000 in 2025), from himself and another $25,000 from his former banking partner Edward Wesley. The paper began publishing as The New York Times on September 14, 1857.

Upon Raymond's death in June 1869, Jones took over as publisher. Between 1870 and 1871, the paper repeatedly attacked Boss Tweed through editorials by George William Curtis and illustrations by Thomas Nast. Tweed tried to buy Raymond's widow's 34% share in the company, but Morgan purchased it before he could. Tweed once had an associate offer Jones $5 million ($120.9 million in 2025), to not print a story that was unfavorable to Tweed; Jones refused the offer and proceeded with the publication of the story. The efforts of the Times contributed to the downfall of Tweed and his corrupt city government.

== Death ==
Jones died on August 12, 1891, four days before his 80th birthday, at the Poland Springs Hotel in South Poland, Maine. He is interred in Sleepy Hollow Cemetery in Sleepy Hollow, New York.

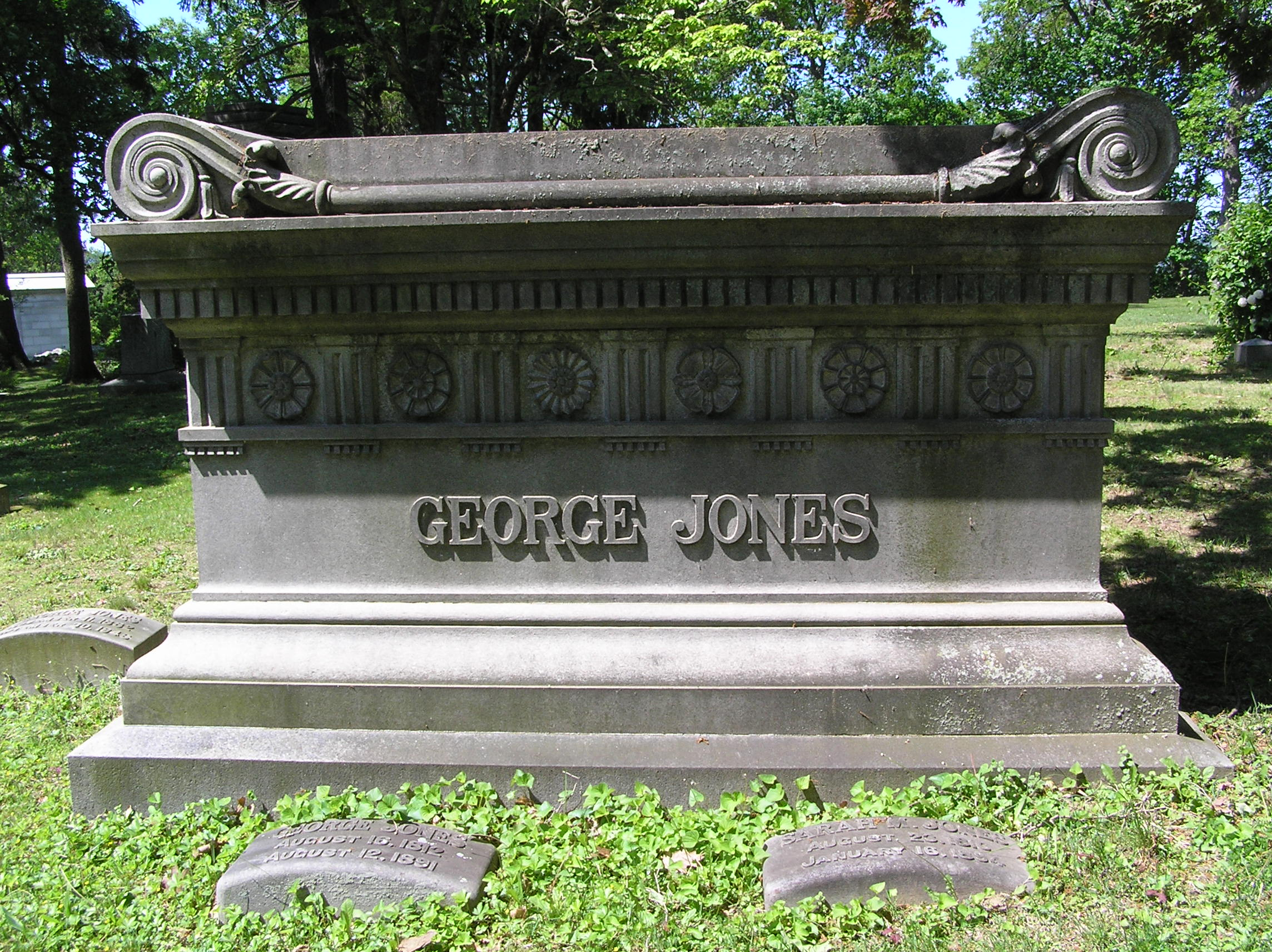
The gravesite of George Jones

== See also ==
- History of American newspapers
