= Eliza Violet Blair =

American journalist (1794–1877)

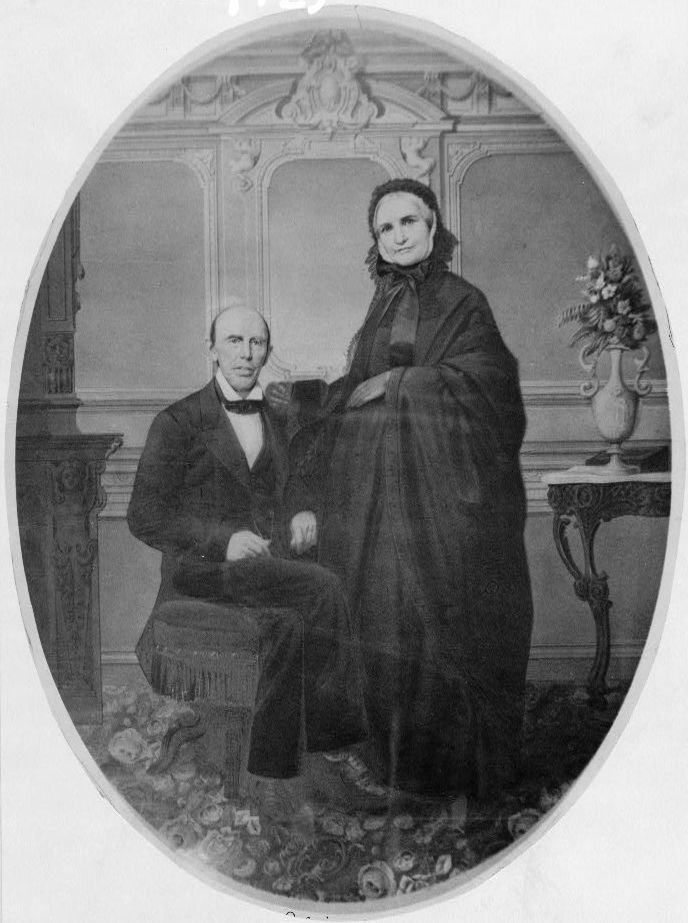
- Francis Preston Blair seated and his wife standing alongside, full length portrait
- Born: Eliza Violet Gist; November 10, 1794
- Died: July 5, 1877 (aged 82); Silver Spring, Maryland, U.S.
- Resting place: Rock Creek Cemetery
- Other name: Mrs. Francis P. Blair
- Occupation: Journalist
- Spouse: Francis Preston Blair
- Children: Montgomery; Elizabeth; James; Frank, Jr.

Eliza Violet Blair (née Gist; November 10, 1794 – July 5, 1877) was an American journalist and political hostess who developed a network of political figures which provided contacts for newspaper articles and editorials and to help build her husband's and son's careers. Blair and her husband Francis Preston Blair managed the Washington Globe. She was the mother of Montgomery Blair, Postmaster General and a judge. Daughter Elizabeth Blair Lee was manager and directress of the Washington City Orphan Asylum. James, a naval officer and a fortune-maker, died of exposure during the United States Exploring Expedition (1838–1842). Son Francis Preston Blair Jr. was a Union Army officer of William Tecumseh Sherman's Army during the Civil War. He campaigned for vice president with presidential candidate Horatio Seymour.

Blair hosted events up to six times per week. Among their friends and political connections were Presidents Andrew Jackson and his family, Martin Van Buren, and Abraham Lincoln and Mary Todd Lincoln. The Blairs became very influential within Washington, D.C. politics, but President James K. Polk was not interested in Preston's support and had him sell the Washington Globe. Preston supported John C. Frémont and helped get him nominated as a presidential candidate for the Republican Party, to his wife's chagrin.

== Early life ==
Eliza Violet Gist, the daughter of Nathaniel Gist and Judith Cary (Bell) Gist was born November 10, 1794. Nathaniel Gist was a colonel in the Virginia Continental Line during the American Revolutionary War. The Gist family and their enslaved people moved from Virginia to Bourbon County, Kentucky in the spring of 1793, or 1794. Her father, a planter and Indian Agent, established a 4,000 acre plantation called Canewood. Gist was either born in either Bourbon County, Kentucky or in Virginia.

Her sisters were Sarah Howard (wife of Jesse Bledsoe), Anne Cary (wife of Nathaniel G. S. Hart), and Maria C. Gist (wife of Benjamin Gratz). Her brothers were Henry Clay and Thomas Cecil Gist. Nathaniel died in 1797, just before the birth of his youngest child, Maria. Judith was a widow for about ten years when she married Charles Scott in 1807. In 1808, he became the governor of Kentucky. Judith and her younger daughters moved to Frankfort, Kentucky to be with Scott in 1808. Gist moved there in 1810.

Henry Clay was a relative by marriage. Gist was the granddaughter of Christopher Gist, frontiersman, explorer, and friend of Daniel Boone. She descends from the Carys of Virginia and the Howards of Maryland. Archibald Cary, a member of the Virginia House of Burgesses, was Judith's granduncle.

== Marriage and children ==
She married Francis "Preston" Blair in the Kentucky Governor's Mansion on July 21, 1812, becoming Eliza Violet Blair. At the time of their marriage, Preston worked at the state circuit court. Preston suffered from tuberculosis, which concerned her mother and stepfather. Preston's health improved with his wife's lung remedy, cooking, and care. Blair had a significant inheritance from her father's and other Gist family members estates. Preston invested in real estate. Blair and her husband had farm land in the beginning of their marriage, but by 1820 they had bought property in a city in Franklin County, Kentucky. During that time, the couple owned two enslaved people. They had financial difficulties at times, which required them to borrow from family or friends, often securing the loans with the Blair's properties.

Blair had six children between 1813 and 1821, Four of whom lived to adulthood, Montgomery, Elizabeth (Lizzie), James, and Frank Jr. Two daughters, Juliet and Laura, died as toddlers in 1816 and 1819. Elizabeth married Samuel Phillips Lee, rear admiral of United States Navy. Among her charity work, Elizabeth was manager and directress of the Washington City Orphan Asylum (now Hillcrest Children and Family Center) for more than four decades. Montgomery was Postmaster General for President Abraham Lincoln and before that a judge in St. Louis, Missouri. James L. Blair was a lieutenant in the Navy, and he went to California and put the first steamboat on the Sacramento River and made a fortune. He died of exposure during the United States Exploring Expedition (1838–1842), led by Charles Wilkes. Francis was a member of Congress and a Free Soil Party leader. During the Civil War (1861–1865), he led the XVII Corps of William Tecumseh Sherman's Army. He campaigned for vice president with presidential candidate Horatio Seymour. The family members were firm in their convictions and opinions, yet treated each other well. Biographer Elbert B. Smith stated, "From its beginning, the Francis Preston Blair family was a clan united by strong feelings of love, trust, and pride."

The family lived in Frankfort, Kentucky before moving to Washington, D.C. The Blairs owned a house, Blair House, and townhouse on Pennsylvania Avenue in Washington, D.C., in 1830. The house was given to their son Montgomery. Elizabeth was given a townhouse, which she shared with her parents during the winter months.

== Journalist and editor ==
Blair and her husband moved from Kentucky to Washington, D.C., in 1830 to establish and run the Washington Globe newspaper, which favored Jacksonian politics. Preston became a member of President Andrew Jackson's Kitchen Cabinet. She was responsible for hard foreign and domestic news as well as human-interest and special features. She stayed current about newsworthy topics and editorials. She supported women's rights. Blair managed the paper during the times that Preston was out of town.

She was a political hostess which helped build the careers of her sons and husband.

== Political relationships and activities ==
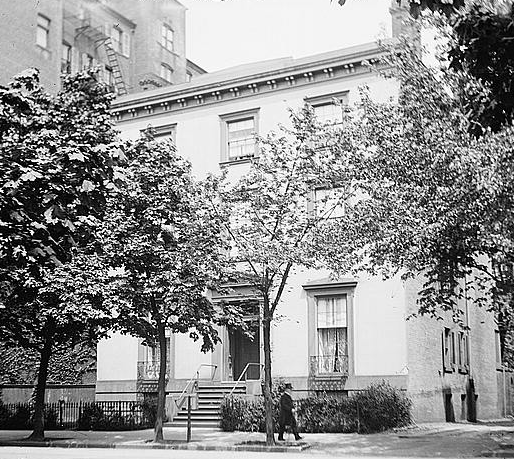
Blair House, Pennsylvania Avenue, Washington, D.C.

The Blairs socialized and vacationed with Andrew Jackson. Blair's daughter Lizzie had tuberculosis and Jackson invited the Blairs to stay at the White House on cold nights and while Blair House was renovated; a welcome invitation since the Blairs lived in rooming houses initially in Washington, D.C. They lived at the White House in 1834 when Jackson was away. Blair and her family joined Jackson for several vacations. Known for her healing ability, she cared for Jackson family members if they were ill as well as other friends and family members. Eliza and Lizzi provided comfort as Jackson mourned the death of his wife Rachel.

Preston supported subsequent presidents Martin Van Buren, who tried to reduce Blair's influence on her husband, and James K. Polk, but Polk was not interested in his support and had him sell the Washington Globe. Politicians from Washington, D.C. sought the Blairs counsel, whose political viewpoints seated in Jacksonian principles, at their house in Silver Spring. They entertained up to six days a week.

Her husband supported John C. Frémont and helped get him nominated as a presidential candidate for the Republican Party after slavery was extended to western territories with the Kansas–Nebraska Act of 1854. Blair did not support Frémont. After Abraham Lincoln was elected president, the Blairs developed relationships with Mary Todd Lincoln, who appreciated Blair's southern graciousness, and Preston advised Lincoln.

During the Civil War, she cared for wounded soldiers and brought healthy food, medicine, and flowers, some men were treated in her home. She was concerned about Confederate and Union military personnel. When Jefferson Davis, the president of the Confederacy, was imprisoned after the war, she called on President Andrew Johnson to allow his wife, Varina Davis, to visit him.

== Death ==
Blair died July 5, 1877. The funeral, which took place at the Blair homestead in Silver Spring, Maryland, was attended by President Rutherford B. Hayes, Attorney General Charles Devens, General Montgomery C. Meigs, Col. Wright Rives, Franklin Rives, and other friends and relatives from Maryland and Washington, D.C. She was buried at Rock Creek Cemetery next to her husband.

Her papers and letters are primarily held by the Library of Congress in the Blair Family Papers collection. There are also relevant documents at Princeton University in the Blair-Lee Papers.

== Bibliography ==
- Atkins, Annette (2001). We grew up together : brothers and sisters in nineteenth-century America. Urbana : University of Illinois Press. ISBN 978-0-252-02605-8.
- Smith, Elbert B. (1980). Francis Preston Blair. New York : Free Press. ISBN 978-0-02-929510-6.
