= Elizabeth Blair Lee =

American woman of letters (1818–1906)

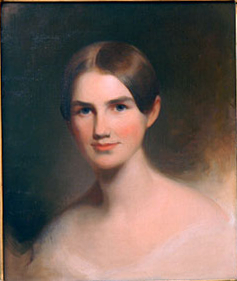
- Elizabeth Blair Lee, portrait by Thomas Sully, when she was 19
- Born: Elizabeth Blair; June 20, 1818; Frankfort, Kentucky, U.S.
- Died: September 13, 1906 (aged 88); Silver Spring, Maryland, U.S.
- Spouse: Samuel Phillips Lee (m. 1843)
- Children: Blair Lee
- Parent(s): Francis Preston Blair; Eliza Violet Blair
- Relatives: Montgomery Blair (brother); Francis Preston Blair Jr. (brother)

Elizabeth Blair Lee (June 20, 1818 – September 13, 1906) was an American woman who lived through the American Civil War and wrote hundreds of letters describing the events of the times to her husband, Samuel Phillips Lee. She played a pivotal role in several Washington, D.C. charities, particularly the Washington City Orphan Asylum where she was a manager and director for decades.

== Early life ==
Elizabeth Lee was born on June 20, 1818, in Frankfort, Kentucky, to Francis Preston Blair and Eliza Violet Gist Blair. She was the sister of Montgomery Blair, James L. Blair, and Francis Preston Blair Jr. The family moved from Kentucky to Washington, D.C. in 1830. Her parents established and ran the newspaper Washington Globe.

When the family moved to Blair House across the street from the White House, the President, Vice President, and Cabinet members were frequent guests. Elizabeth and her mother were friends of President Andrew Jackson's niece, Emily Donelson, who served as First Lady for her uncle, whose wife had died. Elizabeth lived in the White House one winter because of her health problems from dampness at Blair House.

According to one version of the story, Elizabeth or her father chanced upon the silver-flecked spring in 1840, inspiring the name of the family's summer home in what would eventually become Silver Spring, Maryland. The spring site is memorialized at Silver Spring's Acorn Park though the water source was disrupted in the 1950s.

== Marriage and family life ==
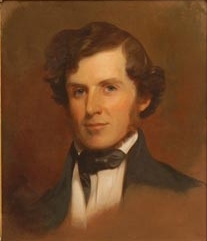
Portrait of Samuel Phillips Lee by Thomas Sully, 1845

She married Samuel Phillips Lee, a U.S. Naval officer on April 27, 1843. During the Civil War, he was away for long periods. Her letters to her husband describe wartime life in her homes of Washington, D.C. and Silver Spring, Maryland. Her letters are published in the book Wartime Washington: the Civil War letters of Elizabeth Blair Lee. Lee received a townhouse next to Blair House in Washington, D.C. from her father. Blair House was given by her parents to her brother Montgomery. Her parents stayed with her at the townhouse during the winter months. She stayed with them at Silver Spring when her husband was at sea.

Elizabeth was the mother of one child, Blair Lee, a state senator from Maryland. After the war, in 1870, Samuel was promoted to rear admiral. He retired in 1873 and became a farmer in Silver Spring.

== Charitable organizations ==
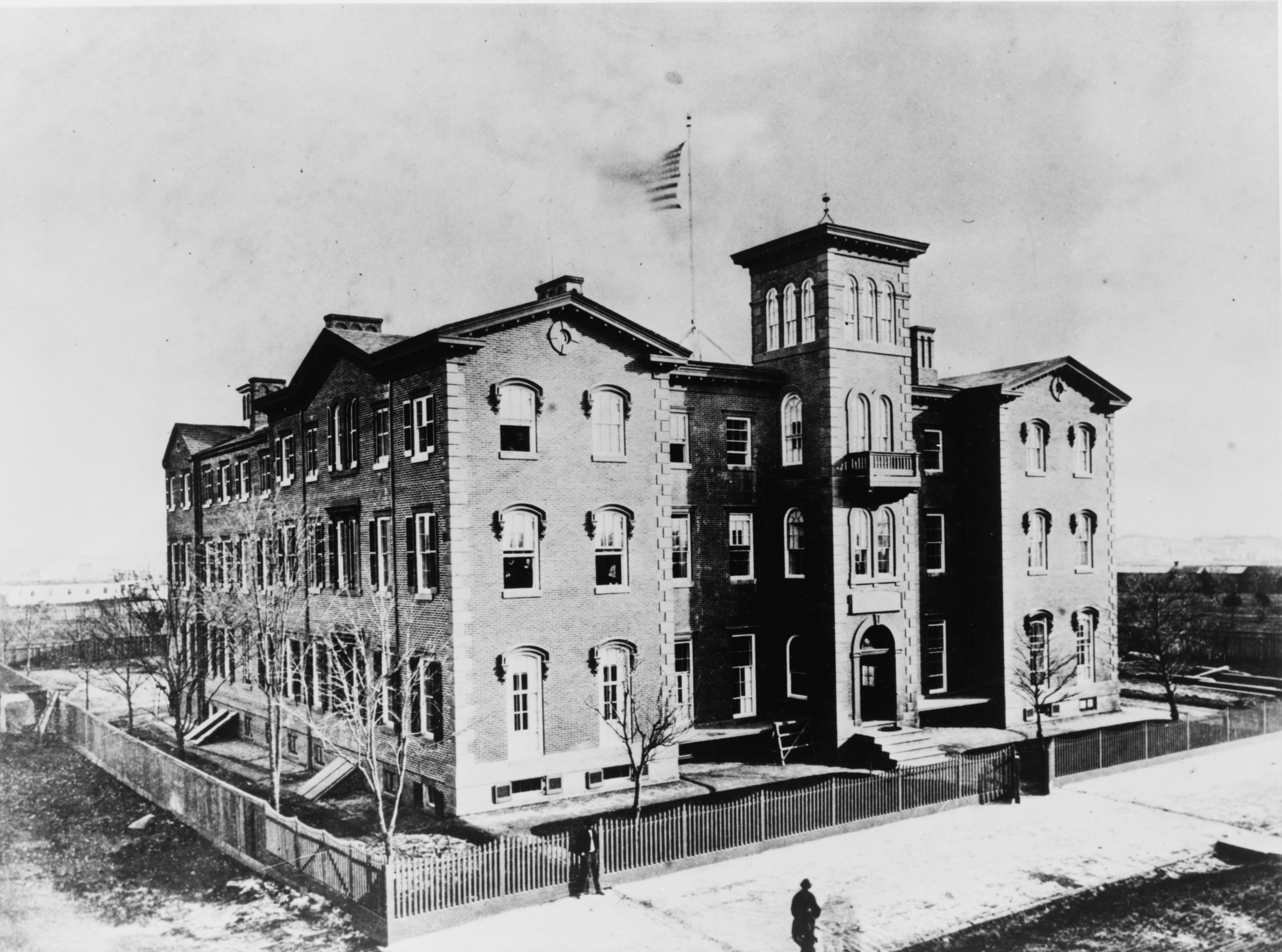
Washington City Orphan Asylum, 1860, Library of Congress

Lee worked with Dolley Madison and Marcia Van Ness, founders of the Washington City Orphan Asylum, to care for orphans left homeless during the War of 1812. Lee was a manager of the organization for 57 years and the directoress for 44 years. She also helped establish the Children's National Hospital and the Columbia Hospital for Women. Lee was a founding member and first president of the Washington Club and a regent for the Mary Washington Chapter of the Daughters of the American Revolution.

== Later years and death ==
Lee had to stop working in the late 1890s, having lost her sight and due to age. She died on September 13, 1906, in Silver Spring, Maryland. Blair was buried next to her husband at Arlington National Cemetery.
