= Edward Dalton Marchant =

American painter (1806–1887)

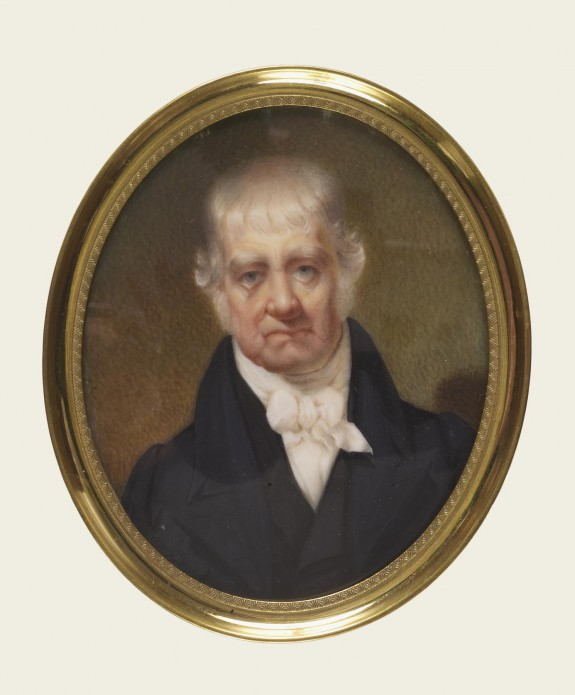
Edward Dalton Marchant, miniature self-portrait, c. 1860. The Walters Art Museum

Edward Dalton Marchant (1806-1887), also known as Edward D. Marchant and E. D. Marchant, was an American artist. He was born in Edgartown, Massachusetts in 1806. Largely self-taught, Marchant began his career as a house painter, establishing a portrait studio in Edgartown by the mid-1820s.

Marchant is known to have studied briefly with artist Gilbert Stuart in Boston in 1825, familiarizing himself with the artist's style. Marchant began an early, peripatetic career by late 1826 advertising his services in a Charleston, South Carolina newspaper, but returned to Edgartown in 1828-1829. He would soon after relocate to Worcester, Massachusetts, painting some of the city's prominent citizens. Marchant was active in New York City after 1832, completing many portraits of well-to-do merchants and political leaders during the 1830s and 1840s; in addition, he completed commissions in several Ohio cities as well as in Nashville and New Orleans, before settling in Philadelphia in 1854 where he would remain for another thirty years. Although mostly known for his portraits in oil, Marchant also created miniatures. He was elected to a number of arts academies and exhibited regularly during his lifetime.

An ardent opponent of slavery who advocated for the return of slaves to Africa, Marchant was commissioned by the Union League of Philadelphia in December 1862 to paint a portrait of Abraham Lincoln to be displayed in Independence Hall. Marchant worked in the White House for several months in early 1863, having daily contact with the President, and ultimately depicted him seated at a table having just signed the Emancipation Proclamation. Marchant said that his painting "triumphantly gives lie to those hideous caricatures of Mr. Lincoln" which were at the time widely circulated in the hostile press. Authorized reproductions of Marchant's somewhat idealized portrait were widely circulated prior to the 1864 presidential election, and printed at a rate of 1,000 per day.

Another 1864 Marchant portrait of Lincoln is featured today in the Lincoln Room of the President's Guest House (known as Blair House) in Washington, D.C., where it may be viewed by visiting dignitaries. Marchant died in Asbury Park, New Jersey on August 15, 1887.

== Gallery ==
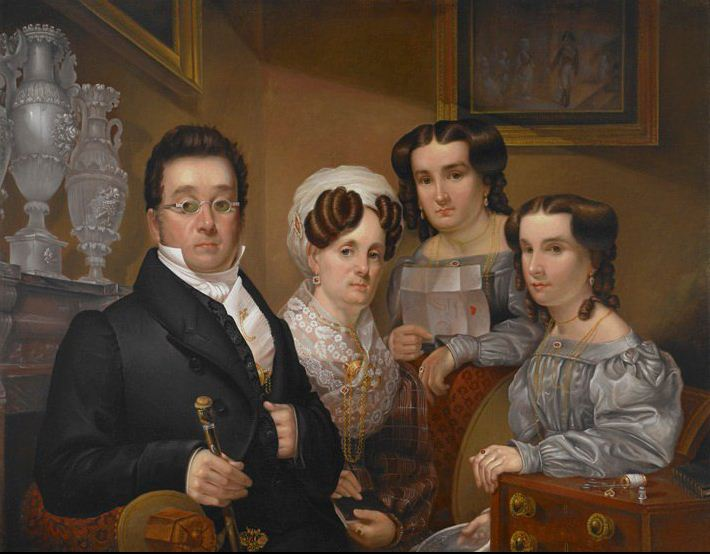
Samuel Beals Thomas, with His Wife, Sarah Kellogg Thomas, and Their Two Daughters, Abigail and Pauline, 1830. Crystal Bridges Museum of American Art

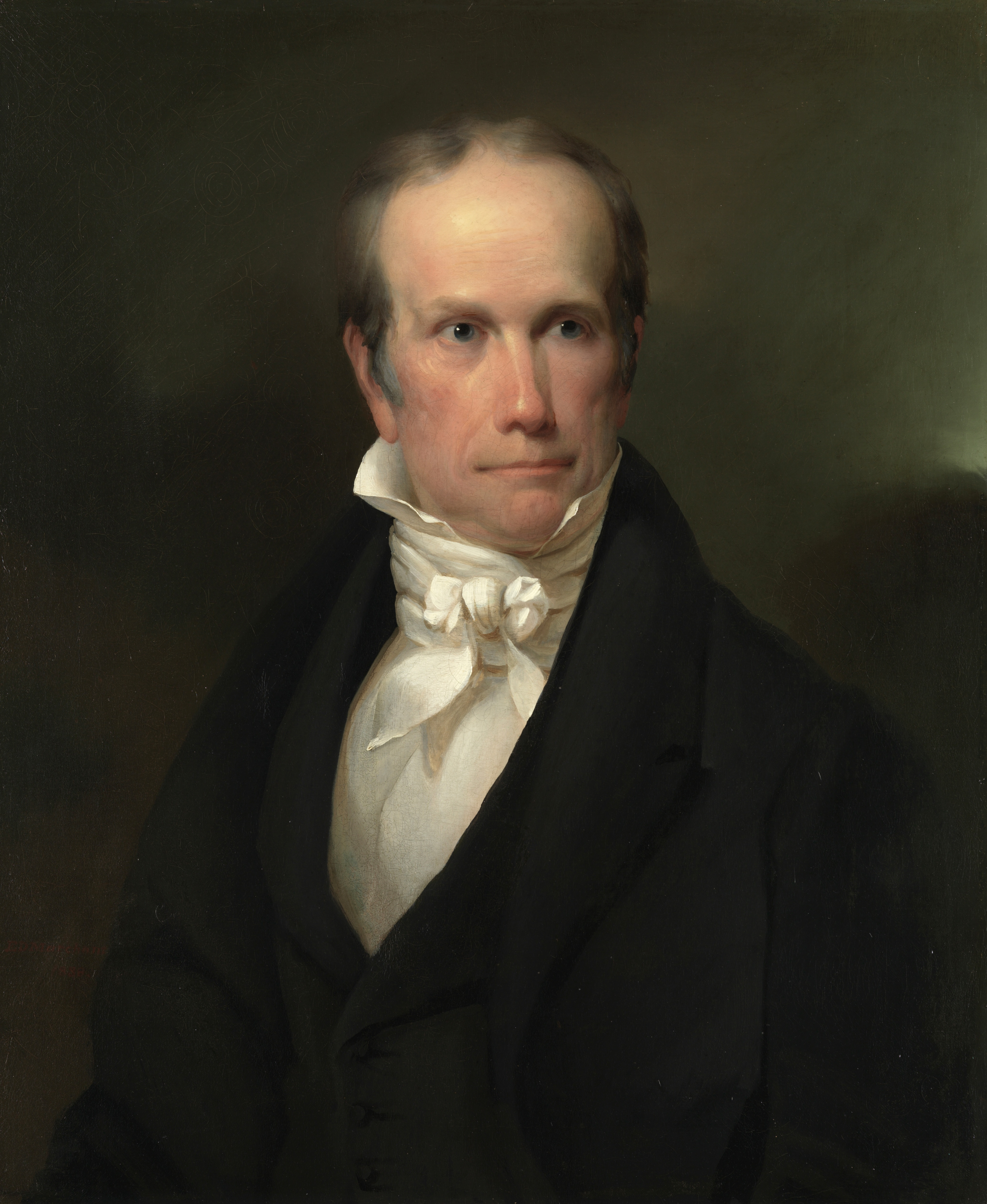
Portrait of Henry Clay, 1838, Diplomatic Reception Rooms, U.S. Department of State

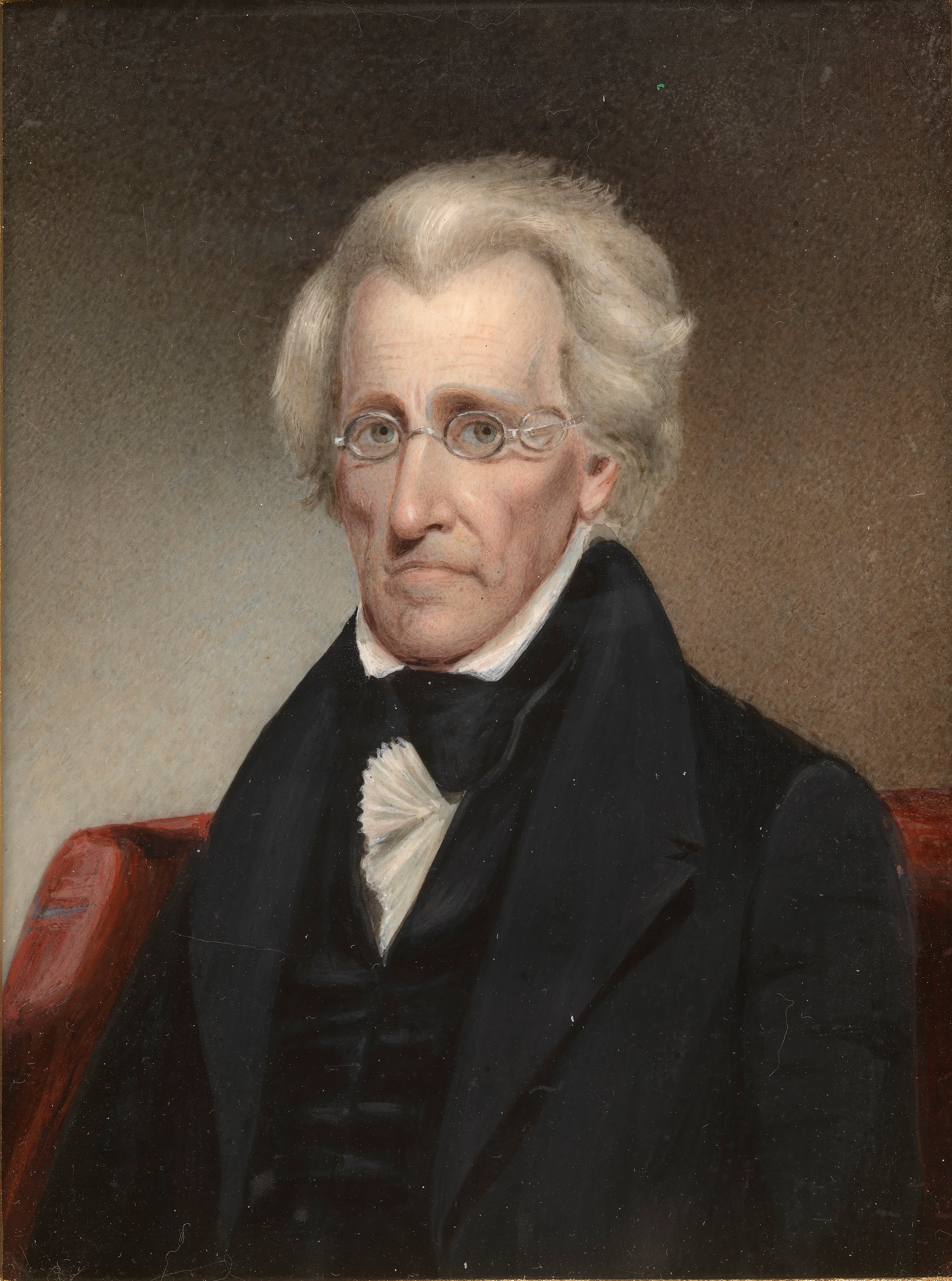
James Tooley, Jr., Portrait of Andrew Jackson, 1840, copy of a painting made that same year by Marchant. National Portrait Gallery, Washington, D.C.

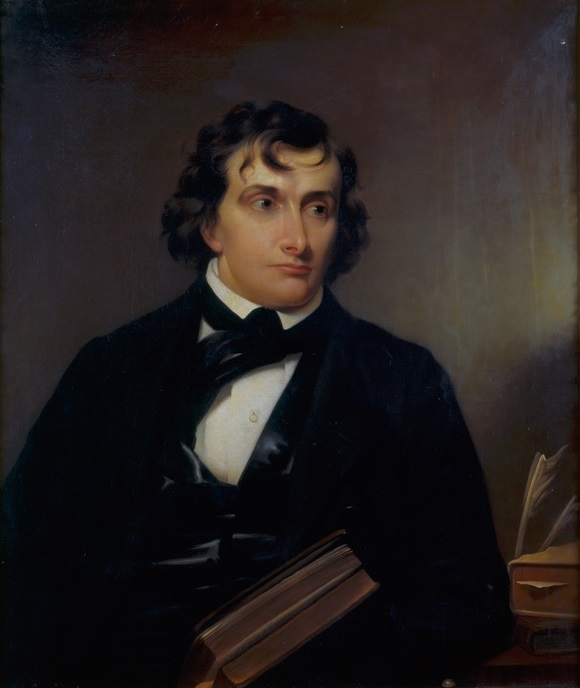
Elisha Reynolds Potter, Jr., 1844. Rhode Island Historical Society
