= Francis Preston Blair =

American journalist (1791–1876)

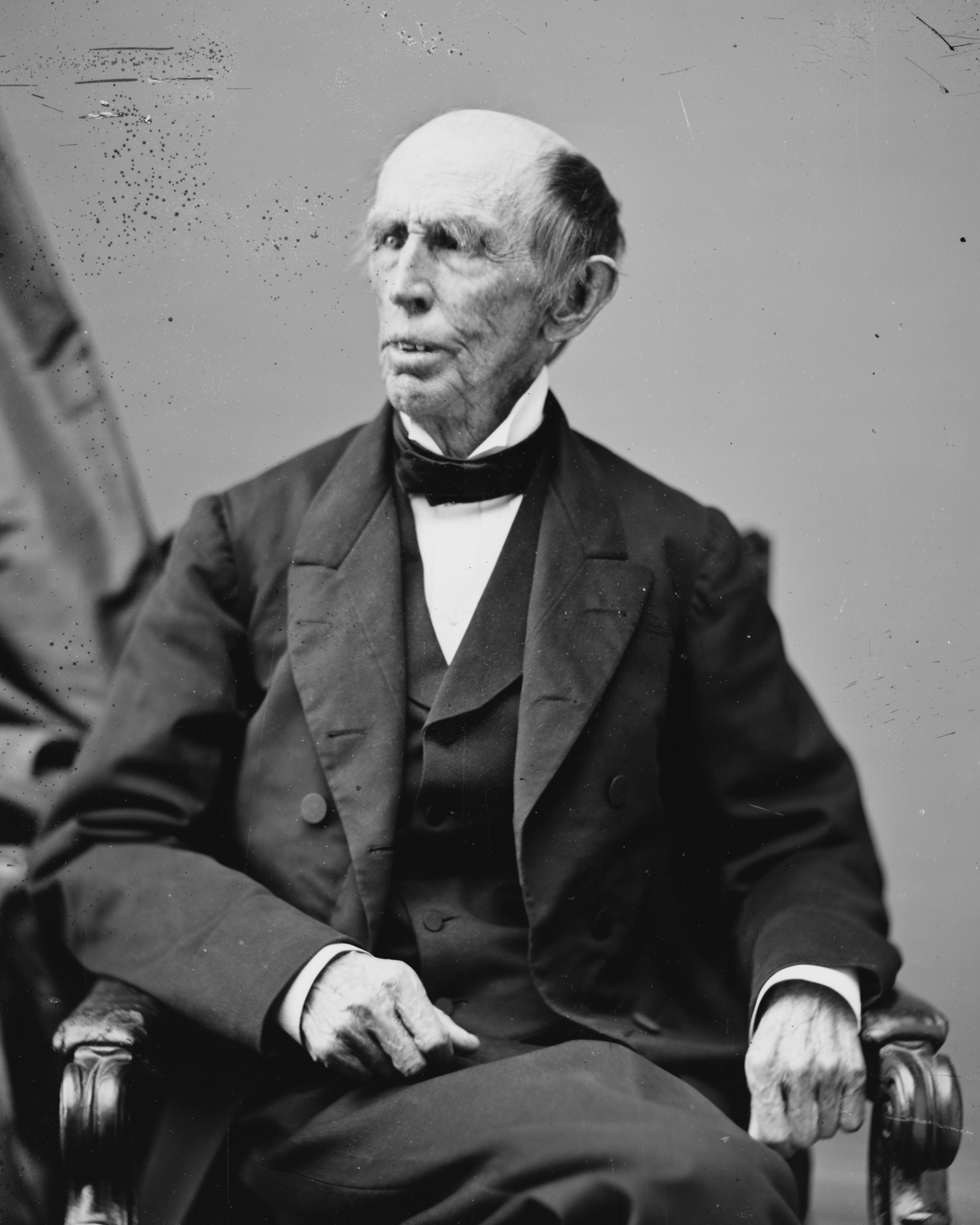
- Blair c. 1870
- Born: April 12, 1791; Abingdon, Virginia, U.S.
- Died: October 18, 1876 (aged 85); Silver Spring, Maryland, U.S.
- Resting place: Rock Creek Cemetery
- Education: Transylvania University
- Occupations: Journalist, politician
- Years active: 1830–1849
- Political party: Democratic (1828–1848; 1865–1876); Free Soil (1848–1854); Republican (1854–1865)
- Spouse: Eliza Violet Gist (m. 1812)
- Children: 5 (incl. Montgomery, Elizabeth, and Francis Jr.)

Signature
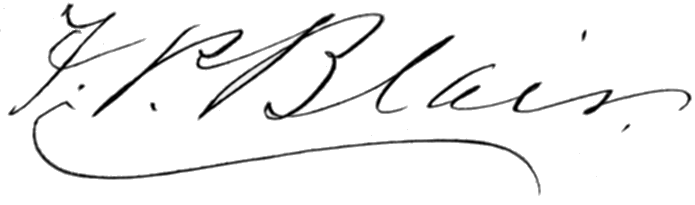

Francis Preston Blair Sr. (April 12, 1791 – October 18, 1876) was an American journalist, newspaper editor, and influential figure in national politics advising various U.S. presidents across party lines. He was an early member of the Democratic Party, and a strong supporter of President Andrew Jackson, having helped him win Kentucky in the 1828 presidential election. From 1831 to 1845, Blair worked as Editor-in-Chief of the Washington Globe, which served as the primary propaganda instrument for the Democratic Party, and was largely successful. He was an influential advisor to President Jackson, and served prominently in a group of unofficial advisors and assistants known as the "Kitchen Cabinet".

Despite being a slaveholder from Kentucky, Blair later came to oppose the expansion of slavery into western territories. He supported the Free Soil Party ticket of Martin Van Buren and Charles Francis Adams Sr. in the 1848 presidential election. In 1854, in opposition to the Kansas–Nebraska Act, Blair left the Democratic Party and helped establish the Republican Party. He served as an advisor to President Abraham Lincoln during the American Civil War. In 1861, Lincoln sent him to offer Robert E. Lee command of a large Union army, but Lee declined and instead joined the Confederate Army. In 1865, Blair helped organize the Hampton Roads Conference, a failed attempt to end the Civil war.

After the Union's victory, Blair became disillusioned with Radical Reconstruction, a policy promoted by many Radical Republicans. He eventually left the Republican party and rejoined the Democrats. His son, Francis Preston Blair Jr., was the party's nominee for vice president on a losing ticket in the 1868 election. Blair died in 1876 at age 85.

His home, Blair House on Lafayette Square across from the White House, is now used to host visiting heads of state and other guests of the president. Blair House was called "the world's most exclusive hotel" in 2009.

== Early life and education ==
Blair was born on April 12, 1791, in Abingdon, Virginia, to a Scottish-American named James Blair, a lawyer who became the Kentucky Attorney General, and Elizabeth Smith. Raised in Frankfort, Kentucky and referred to as "Preston" by the family members, he graduated from Transylvania University with honors in 1811. He studied law, was admitted to the bar in 1817 but did not practice due to a vocal defect. He took to journalism, and became a contributor to Amos Kendall's paper, the Frankfort Argus.

== Career ==
During the social and financial turmoil caused by the Panic of 1819, Blair joined the Relief Party of Kentucky. He participated in the Old Court – New Court controversy in Kentucky. He was president of the public Bank of the Commonwealth, which opened in May 1821 to provide relief for debtors. The Bank's charter was denied by the Kentucky Court of Appeals (KCoA), which was backed by the United States 7th Circuit Court of Appeals. The KCoA ruled that the relief measures already started were unconstitutional. The state legislature abolished the KCoA, and created a new Court of Appeals, but the Justices of the old KCoA refused to accept this act or turn over the Court's records. In 1824, Blair was appointed Clerk of the "New Court", and led a party which broke into the clerk's office and seized the records. A few years later, the New Court was abolished and Blair returned.

As an ardent follower of Andrew Jackson, he helped him to carry Kentucky in the 1828 presidential election. In 1830, he was made editor of The Washington Globe, the newspaper that was the recognized organ of the Jacksonian democracy. In this capacity, and as a member of Jackson's unofficial advisory council, the so-called "Kitchen Cabinet", he exerted a powerful influence on national politics. The Washington Globe was the administration's voice until 1841, and the chief Democratic organ until 1845, when Blair ceased to be its editor. He partnered with John C. Rives, and started a printing house, receiving profitable orders from Congress, including publishing the proceedings of Congress in The Congressional Globe, the precursor of the Congressional Record. During his time in Washington serving Jackson, Blair acquired in 1836 what later became known as the Blair House at Washington, D.C.

Throughout his life, Blair suffered from tuberculosis.

=== Politics ===
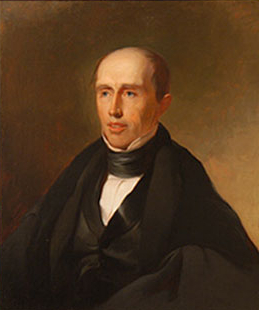
Blair in a May 1845 portrait by Thomas Sully

Blair backed James K. Polk during the 1844 presidential election; however, he did not establish a good rapport with Polk and was forced to sell his interest in The Washington Globe. In 1848, he actively supported Martin Van Buren, the Free Soil candidate, for the presidency. Next, in 1852, Blair supported Franklin Pierce, but became disillusioned in his administration after Pierce backed the Kansas–Nebraska Act. With other anti-slavery, free-soil Democrats, Blair helped to organize the new Republican Party, and presided at its 1856 preliminary convention at Pittsburgh on February 22, 1856, forging a party block out of discordant elements of Whigs, abolitionists, free-soilers and nativists. He used his political experience, influence and persuasion to create a momentum for a new party.

At the 1856 Republican National Convention in Philadelphia, he was influential in securing the nomination of John C. Frémont, who was married to Jessie Benton Frémont, a daughter of his old friend, Thomas Hart Benton, for the presidency. At the 1860 Republican convention in Chicago, he was delegate at large from Maryland and initially supported Edward Bates in the 1860 presidential nomination. When it became clear that Bates would not win, Blair supported the nomination of Abraham Lincoln who went on to win the election and become the nation's 16th president.

The elder Blair took it upon himself to advise Lincoln, and both of his sons, Francis Jr., who became a Union general, and Montgomery Blair, who joined Lincoln's cabinet, were the president's trusted associates. On April 17, 1861, just three days after the surrender of Fort Sumter, Lincoln asked Francis Blair to convey his offer to Colonel Robert E. Lee to command the Union Army. The next day, Lee visited Blair across Lafayette Square from the White House. Lee blunted Blair's offer of the Union command by saying: "Mr. Blair, I look upon secession as anarchy. If I owned the four millions of slaves at the South, I would sacrifice them all to the Union; but how can I draw my sword upon Virginia, my native State?"

After Lincoln's re-election in 1864, Blair thought that his former close personal relations with the Confederate leaders, including President Jefferson Davis, might aid in bringing about a cessation of hostilities, and with Lincoln's consent went unofficially two times to Richmond and induced President Davis to appoint commissioners including Confederate Vice President Alexander H. Stephens to confer with representatives of the United States. This political maneuvering resulted in the futile Hampton Roads Conference of February 3, 1865.

During the Reconstruction Era, Blair advocated a speedy reunification without placing much burden on the Southern states and spoke against the Radical Republicans' Reconstruction policies in the South. He became a political ally of President Andrew Johnson, and eventually rejoined the Democratic Party.

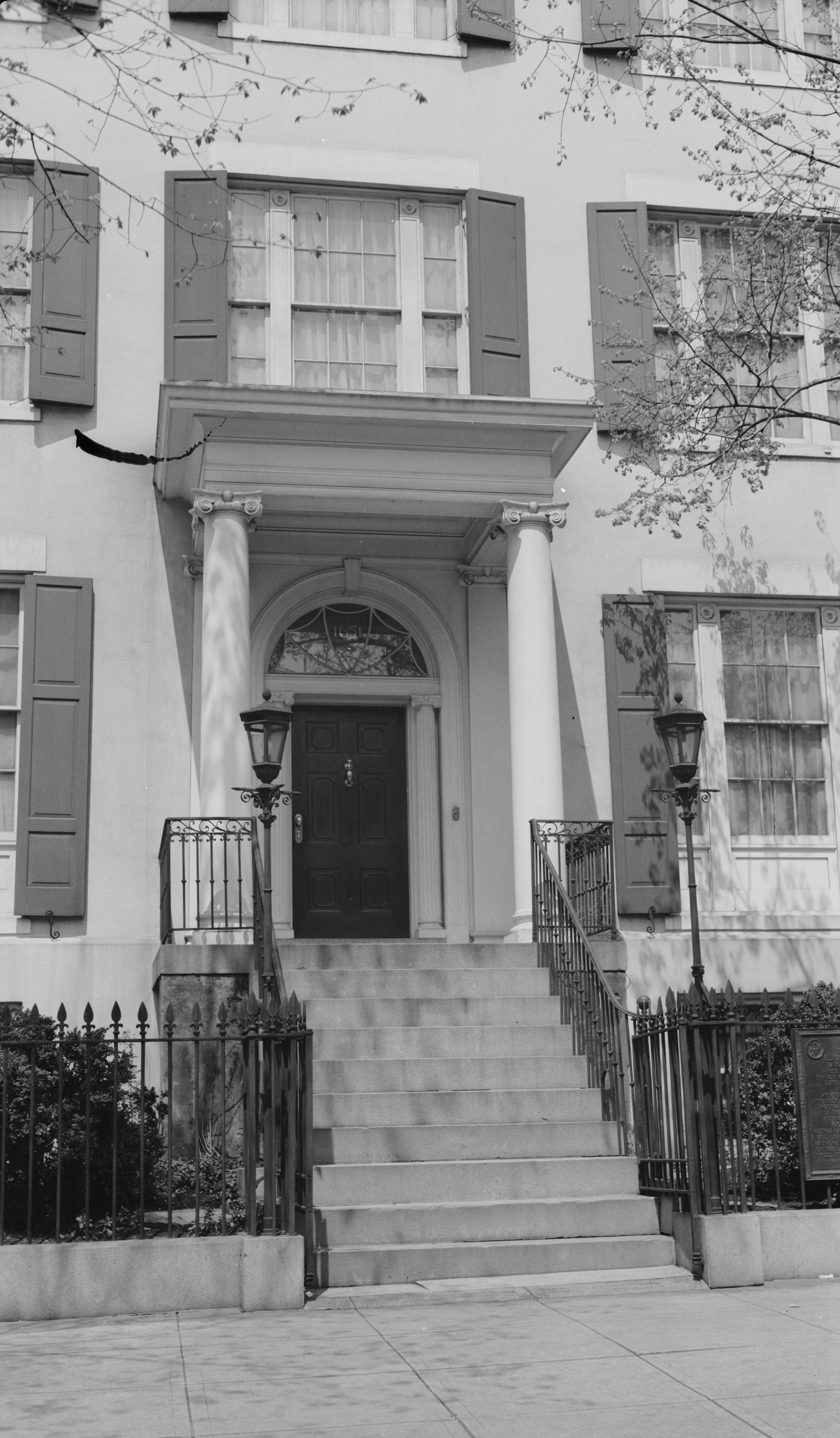
lThe entrance to Blair House at 1651 Pennsylvania Avenue in Washington, D.C.

Blair established his residence in Washington, D.C. in 1836 after acquiring a home at 1651 Pennsylvania Avenue. NW. The brick dwelling first became known as Blair's House and then simply Blair House. In 1840, Blair and perhaps his daughter Elizabeth encountered a "mica-flecked" spring in the vicinity of Seventh Street Pike, now Acorn Park on Blair Mill Rd. off the renamed Georgia Avenue in Montgomery County, Maryland. He liked the location at present-day East West Highway and Newell Street in Silver Spring, Maryland, so much that he bought the surrounding land and built a spacious summer home in 1849 which he called The Silver Spring. His son James, a naval officer, and his wife Mary lived in a two-story cottage on the estate, eventually naming it The Moorings. Blair's other son, Montgomery, built a summer house for his family nearby, calling it Falkland; it was burned in 1864 during a Confederate raid by Lt. Gen. Jubal Early. Early denied personal involvement with the destruction of Falkland and took credit for saving The Crystal Spring from plunder.

In 1854, Blair gave his District of Columbia house to his son Montgomery and permanently settled at "The Silver Spring." After his death, his daughter Elizabeth inherited the house for her lifetime.

Even though he held slaves in his household, Blair became convinced after the Mexican-American War that slavery should not be extended beyond where it was currently allowed. By 1862, Blair had told his slaves that they could "go when they wished"; he later said that "all but one declined the privilege," choosing to stay on as servants.

After the American Civil War, Blair placed all his political hopes and aspirations with his son, Francis Preston Blair Jr., who was the 1868 Democratic vice presidential candidate and, in 1871, became a U.S. Senator, representing the state of Missouri.

== Death ==
Blair died on October 18, 1876, in Silver Spring, Maryland, at the age of 85. He was buried in Rock Creek Cemetery.

== Personal life ==
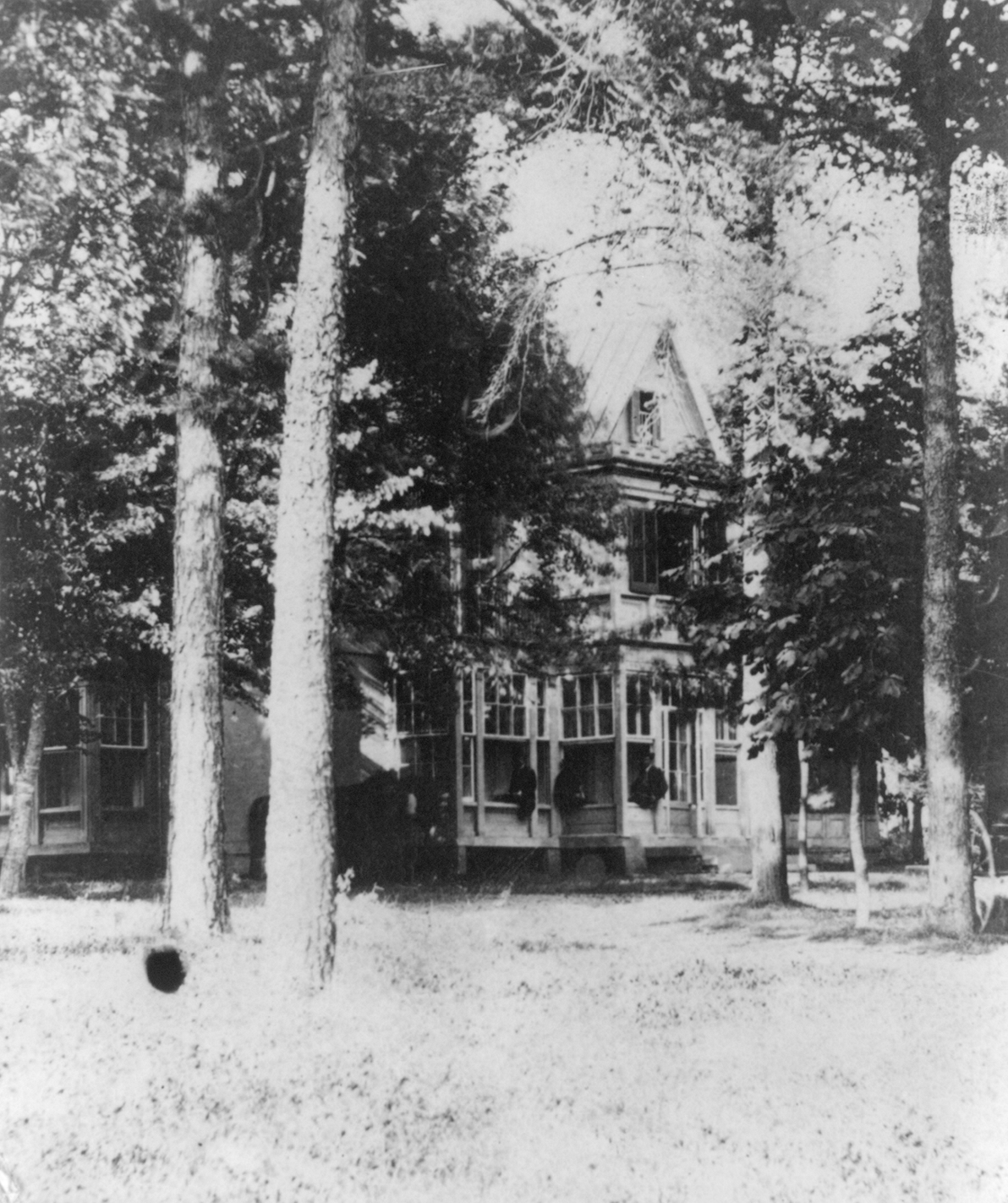
Blair's estate, known then as The Silver Spring

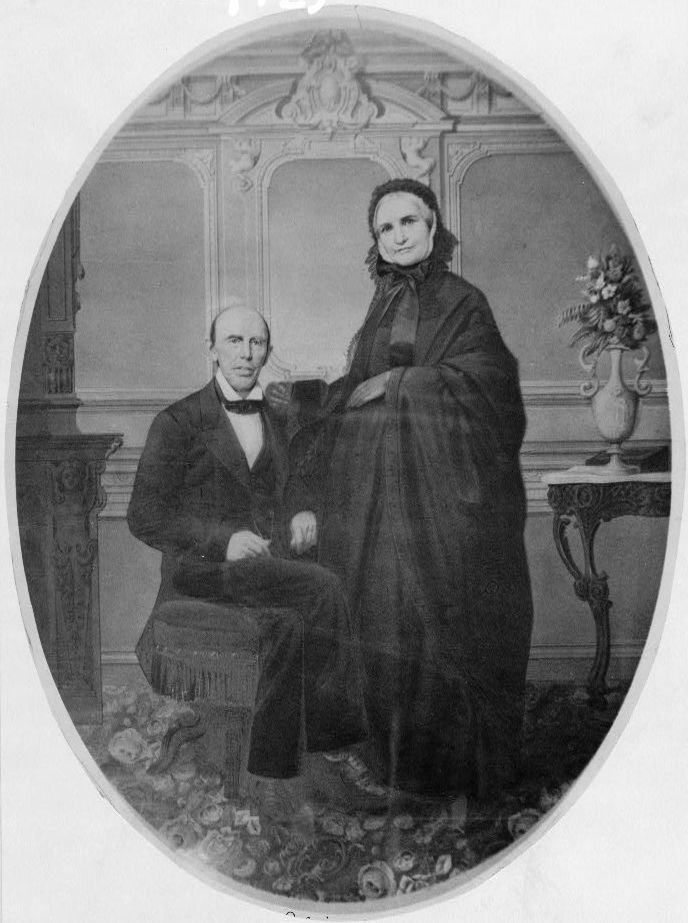
Blair and his wife Eliza Violet Gist Blair at The Silver Spring

Francis married Eliza Violet Gist on July 21, 1812. He had three sons, Montgomery Blair (1813–1883), James L. Blair (1819–1852) and Francis "Frank" Preston Blair Jr. (1821–1875), and two daughters, Juliet Blair (1816–1819) and Elizabeth Blair (1818–1906). Montgomery and Francis became prominent in American politics. Among many contributions, Montgomery Blair represented Dred Scott before the United States Supreme Court in the seminal 1857 case regarding slavery. Francis became a prominent Senator and ran as the Democratic Party's nominee for vice president in 1868. James, who participated as a midshipman in Antarctica's exploration and was later commissioned as a lieutenant in the U.S. Navy, made his fortune during the California Gold Rush, but died at an early age. Blair's daughter, Elizabeth married Rear Admiral Samuel Phillips Lee and was a close friend of Mary Todd Lincoln. His nephew, Benjamin Gratz Brown (1826–1885) was also politically inclined, becoming a U.S. Senator and Missouri Governor. His grandson, Blair Lee I (1857–1944) became a U.S. Senator from Maryland.

== Legacy ==
As editor of The Washington Globe newspaper for 15 years and publisher of The Congressional Globe, Preston Blair became an influential political figure of the Jacksonian Era, and served as an unofficial adviser to presidents Andrew Jackson and Martin Van Buren. By idealizing republicanism and democracy as national ideals in his writing, he contributed to the growing popular spirit of Americanism. Blair held onto his political capital during Van Buren's presidency, but began losing his political influence as the pro-slavery wing of the Democratic Party gained more power.

In response, after briefly supporting the Free Soil Party, he helped to launch the new Republican party in 1854. At the outbreak of the Civil War, he personally conveyed Lincoln's offer to Robert E. Lee to command all the Union armies, which Lee rejected. During the war, Blair served as unofficial political adviser to Lincoln. After Lincoln's re-election, Blair organized the abortive Hampton Roads Conference, where peace terms were discussed with the Confederates, but no substantial issues resolved. He opposed the radical congressional Reconstruction of the South after the Civil War.

William Ernest Smith, Professor of American History from Miami University in Oxford, Ohio, wrote in 1933 that Francis Preston Blair and his two sons, Francis and Montgomery, "are representatives of a longer period of influence in American politics than any other family except the Adams family." Two of Blair's three sons, Montgomery Blair and Francis Preston Blair Jr. were prominent in American politics; his daughter, Elizabeth Blair Lee, was Mary Todd Lincoln's confidante. Blair's Washington, D.C., residence with its rich history withstood the test of time and currently Blair House is the common name of the President's Guest House complex.

The city of Silver Spring, Maryland took its name from Blair's estate. Out of three houses connected to the Blairs at Silver Spring, only the house of James Blair survived. In her will, Violet Blair Janin, a daughter of James and Mary Blair, designated the house for public use and renamed it from The Moorings to Jesup Blair House in honor of her brother. It is currently located in the center of 14.5-acre Blair Park at Silver Spring and is administered by the Maryland-National Capital Park and Planning Commission.

In 1885, a new school at 635 I Street, NE in Washington D.C. was renamed the "Blair School" in honor of Francis P. Blair Sr. The school was closed prior to 1978 when the building became the home of Blair House, a large Transitional Rehabilitation housing facility.

== Media portrayal ==
- In Steven Spielberg's Lincoln (2012), Preston Blair is played by Hal Holbrook.
- In Ronald Maxwell's Gods and Generals (2003), Preston Blair is played by Malachy McCourt.

== See also ==
- Old Court – New Court controversy
