= Blair House =

U.S. presidential guest house in Washington, D.C.

Blair House The President's Guest House

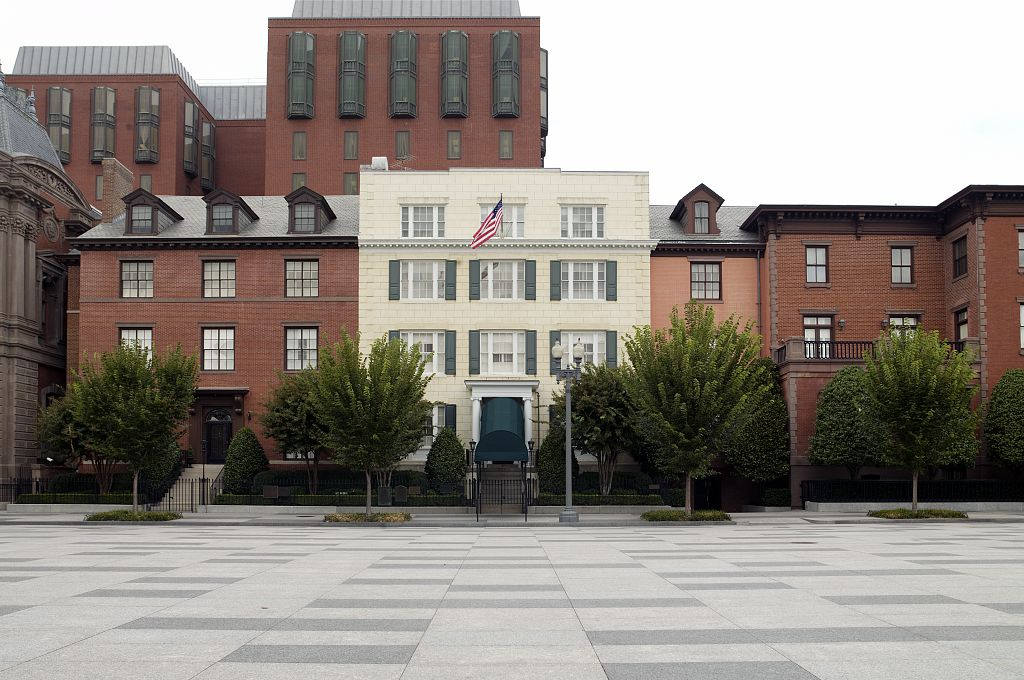
- Blair House in 2007

- Location within Central Washington, D.C.

General information
- Type: Official residence
- Architectural style: Federal (Blair House and Lee House); Victorian (Peter Parker House and 704 Jackson Place)
- Location: 1651 Pennsylvania Avenue N.W., Washington, D.C., U.S.
- Coordinates: 38°53′56″N 77°02′19″W
- Construction started: 1824
- Completed: 1989
- Owner: Federal government of the United States
- Landlord: Chief of Protocol of the United States

Technical details
- Material: Brick and stucco
- Floor count: 4
- Floor area: 70,000 sq ft (6,500 m^{2})

Design and construction
- Architecture firm: Mendel, Mesick, Cohen, Waite, Hall Architects (1982 merger of four existing structures)

Other information
- Number of rooms: 119

Website
- www.blairhouse.org
- Blair House
- U.S. National Register of Historic Places
- U.S. National Historic Landmark
- NRHP reference No.: 66000963

Significant dates
- Added to NRHP: October 15, 1966
- Designated NHL: October 26, 1973

Blair House, also known as The President's Guest House, is an official residence in Washington, D.C., the capital of the United States. The President's Guest House has been called "the world's most exclusive hotel" because it is primarily used as a state guest house to host visiting dignitaries and other guests of the president. Parts of the historic complex have been used for an official residence since the 1940s.

Located diagonally across Pennsylvania Avenue from the White House, it is a complex of four formerly separate homes, Blair House, Lee House, Peter Parker House, and 704 Jackson Place. Major renovations of these 19th-century residences between the 1950s and 1980s joined the homes together. It now has 14 guest bedrooms and at 70,000 square feet (6,500 m^{2}) is larger than the Executive Residence of the White House. Blair House is one of several residences owned by the United States government for use by the president and vice president of the United States; other such residences include the White House, Camp David, One Observatory Circle, the Presidential Townhouse, and Trowbridge House.

President Harry S. Truman and his family lived in the original Blair House from late November 1948 to March 27, 1952, during the White House Reconstruction. Truman survived a 1950 assassination attempt at Blair House. It is one of only seven houses to serve as the presidential residence in the history of the United States, and one of only three along with the White House and The Octagon House that still stand.

== Name ==
Strictly speaking, Blair House refers to one of four existing structures that were merged to form a single building. The U.S. State Department generally uses the name Blair House to refer to the entire facility, saying, "Blair House is the building officially known as the President's Guest House." The General Services Administration refers to the entire complex as the "President's Guest House" and uses the name Blair House to denote the historic Blair House portion of the facility.

== History ==
=== Pre-unification ===
==== Blair House ====
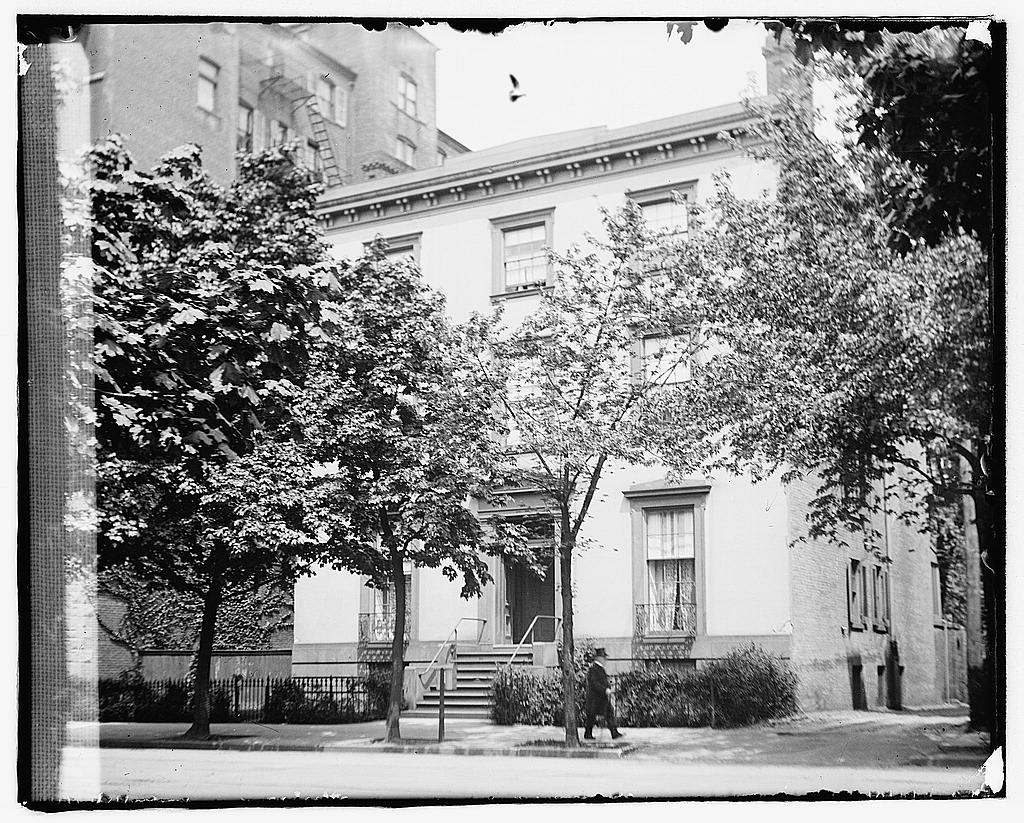
Blair House, as a separate building, c. 1919

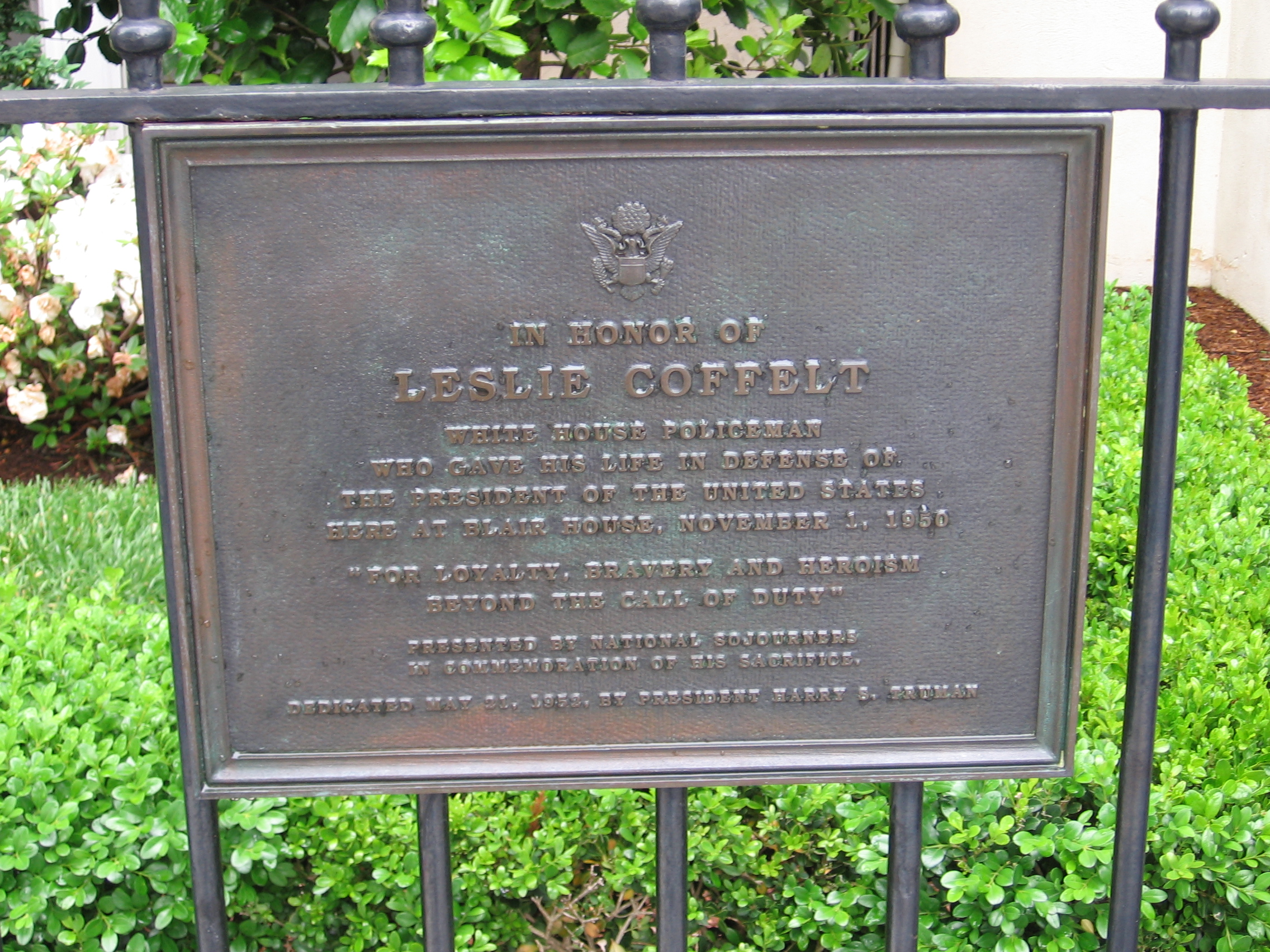
A marker on the exterior of Blair House memorializes police officer Leslie Coffelt, who was killed defending the building in 1950.

Blair House was constructed in 1824; it is the oldest of the four structures that make up the President's Guest House. The original brick house was built as a private home for Joseph Lovell, eighth surgeon general of the United States Army. It was acquired in 1836 by Francis Preston Blair, a newspaper publisher and influential advisor to President Andrew Jackson, and remained in his family for the following century.

Francis Blair's son Montgomery Blair, who served as Postmaster General in Abraham Lincoln's administration, succeeded his father as resident of Blair House. At a meeting at Blair House on April 18, 1861, Francis Preston Blair Sr. relayed the previous day's offer by Lincoln to Robert E. Lee to command all the Union Forces in the approaching American Civil War. Later that same year, a conference there decided Admiral David Farragut would command an assault on New Orleans.

In 1939, a commemorative marker was placed at Blair House by the United States Department of the Interior, becoming the first building to acquire a federally recognized landmark designation; prior landmarks had been monuments and historic sites other than buildings. It would be formally designated a National Historic Landmark in 1973.

Beginning in 1942, the Blair family began leasing the property to the U.S. government for use by visiting dignitaries; the government purchased the property outright the following December. The move was prompted in part by a request from Eleanor Roosevelt, who found the casual familiarity Winston Churchill displayed during his lengthy war-time stays at the White House sometimes an imposition. On one occasion, Churchill tried to enter Franklin Roosevelt's private apartments at 3:00 a.m. to wake the president for a conversation.

During most of the presidency of Harry Truman, from November, 1948, to March 27, 1952, Blair House served as the residence of Harry S. Truman and his family while the interior of the White House was being renovated. On November 1, 1950, Puerto Rican nationalists Griselio Torresola and Oscar Collazo attempted to assassinate President Truman in Blair House. The assassination was foiled, in part by White House policeman Leslie Coffelt, who killed Torresola but was mortally wounded by him.

==== Lee House ====
In 1859, Francis Preston Blair built a house next to Blair House for his daughter Elizabeth Blair Lee and son-in-law Samuel Phillips Lee. The property became known as Lee House.

==== Peter Parker House and 704 Jackson Place ====
The Peter Parker House located at 700 Jackson Place and an adjacent home at 704 Jackson Place were constructed in 1860. Peter Parker House is so named because it was originally the home of physician Peter Parker. The U.S. government acquired both properties between 1969 and 1970, after having rented them for office space. Peter Parker House previously served as the headquarters of the Civil War Centennial Commission and the Carnegie Endowment for International Peace, and is, like Blair House, a National Historic Landmark.

=== Unification ===
==== Unification of Blair House and Lee House ====
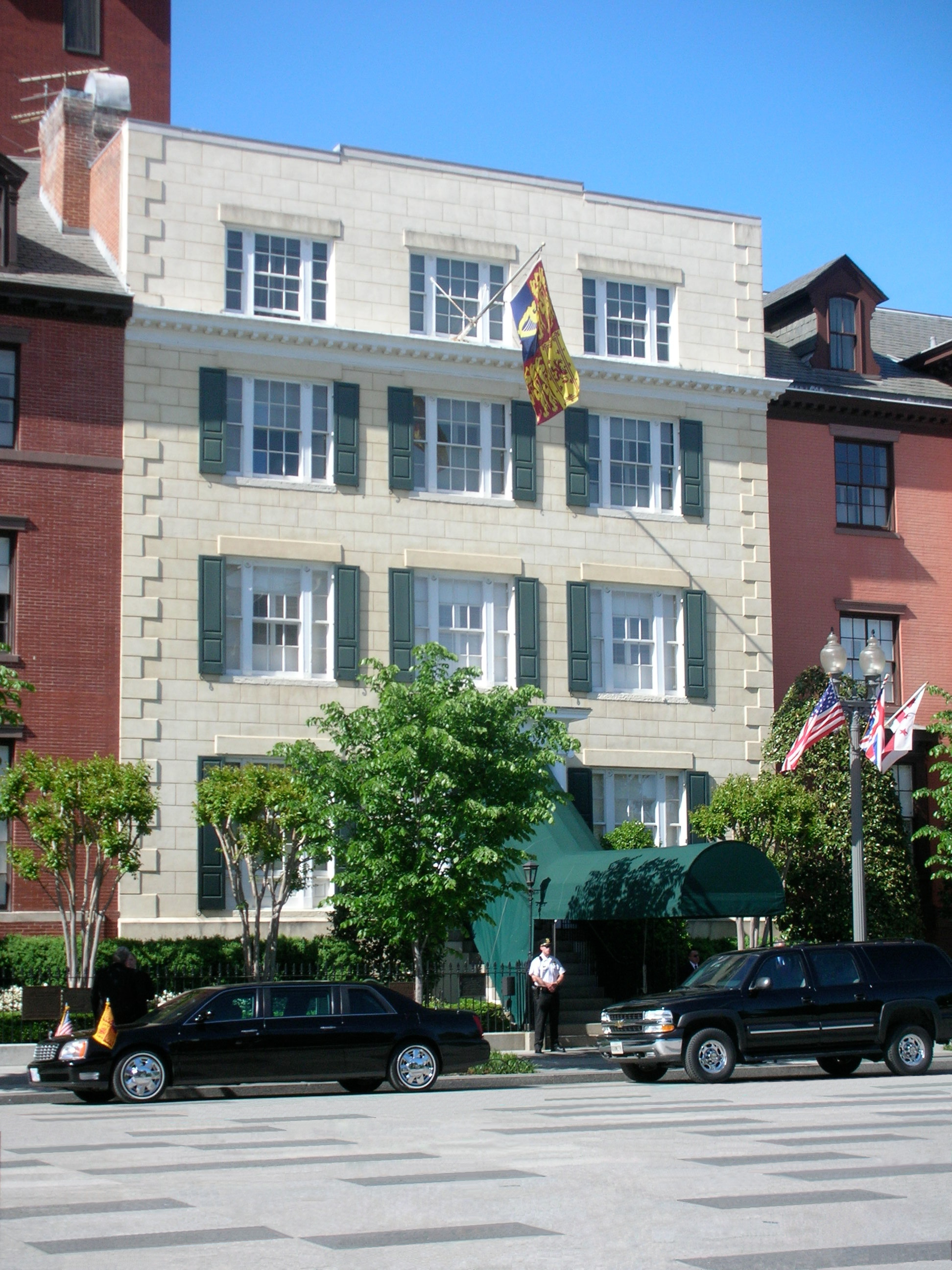
Façade of the original Blair House during the state visit of Queen Elizabeth II in 2007 with the Royal Standard of the United Kingdom flying from the flagpole

During a renovation in the early 1950s, Blair House and Lee House were joined into a single facility that was informally known as Blair–Lee House.

==== Unification of Blair–Lee House with Jackson Place buildings ====
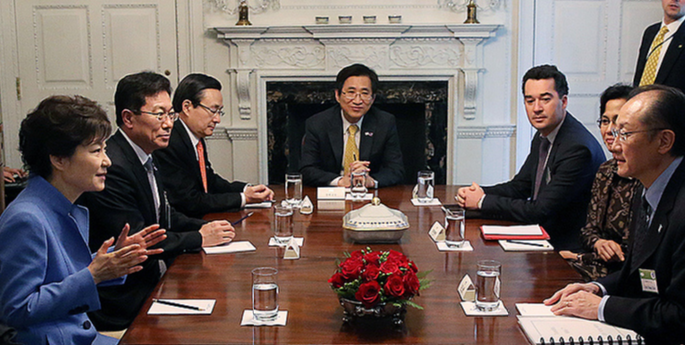
President Park Geun-hye of South Korea (left) hosts a 2013 meeting with World Bank leaders in the President's Guest House.

Congress appropriated $9.7 million in the early 1980s for the property's further renovation and improvement. Federally appropriated funds were augmented with $5 million in private donations. The Jackson Place properties were internally combined into a single building and then merged with Blair–Lee House by way of a connecting structure occupying the alleyway that had separated them. The renovation and merger of the four properties resulted in their closure from 1982 through 1988.

=== Notable guests ===
Notable guests who have stayed at the President's Guest House or the formerly separate Blair House include Queen Elizabeth II, Nikita Khrushchev, Vyacheslav Molotov, Emperor Akihito, Celal Bayar, Adnan Menderes, Charles de Gaulle, Abubakar Tafawa Balewa, François Mitterrand, Vladimir Putin, Boris Yeltsin, Hosni Mubarak, Margaret Thatcher, Mikhail Gorbachev, Gloria Macapagal Arroyo, Javier Pérez de Cuéllar, Nambaryn Enkhbayar, Aung San Suu Kyi, Tony Blair, Narendra Modi, Lee Hsien Loong, Hamid Karzai, Benjamin Netanyahu, Luiz Inácio Lula da Silva, Recep Tayyip Erdoğan, Justin Trudeau, Rishi Sunak, Friedrich Merz, Anthony Albanese, and King Charles III.

The President's Guest House has also been made available by the outgoing president of the United States to the president-elect for the five days prior to the presidential inauguration. In 1992, President-elect Bill Clinton chose to stay at the Hay–Adams Hotel instead of the guest house and, in 2009, a request by President-elect Barack Obama to take up residence at the President's Guest House two weeks early was rejected because of its prior commitment to international dignitaries, include former Australian prime minister John Howard.

During the state funeral of a former president of the United States, the former president's family customarily resides in the guest house for the duration of the observances.

At the beginning of her tenure as vice president, Kamala Harris and her husband, second gentleman Doug Emhoff, lived at Blair House while repairs were made to Number One Observatory Circle, the vice president's residence. They moved from Blair House to Number One Observatory in early April 2021.

== Layout ==
=== Exterior spaces ===
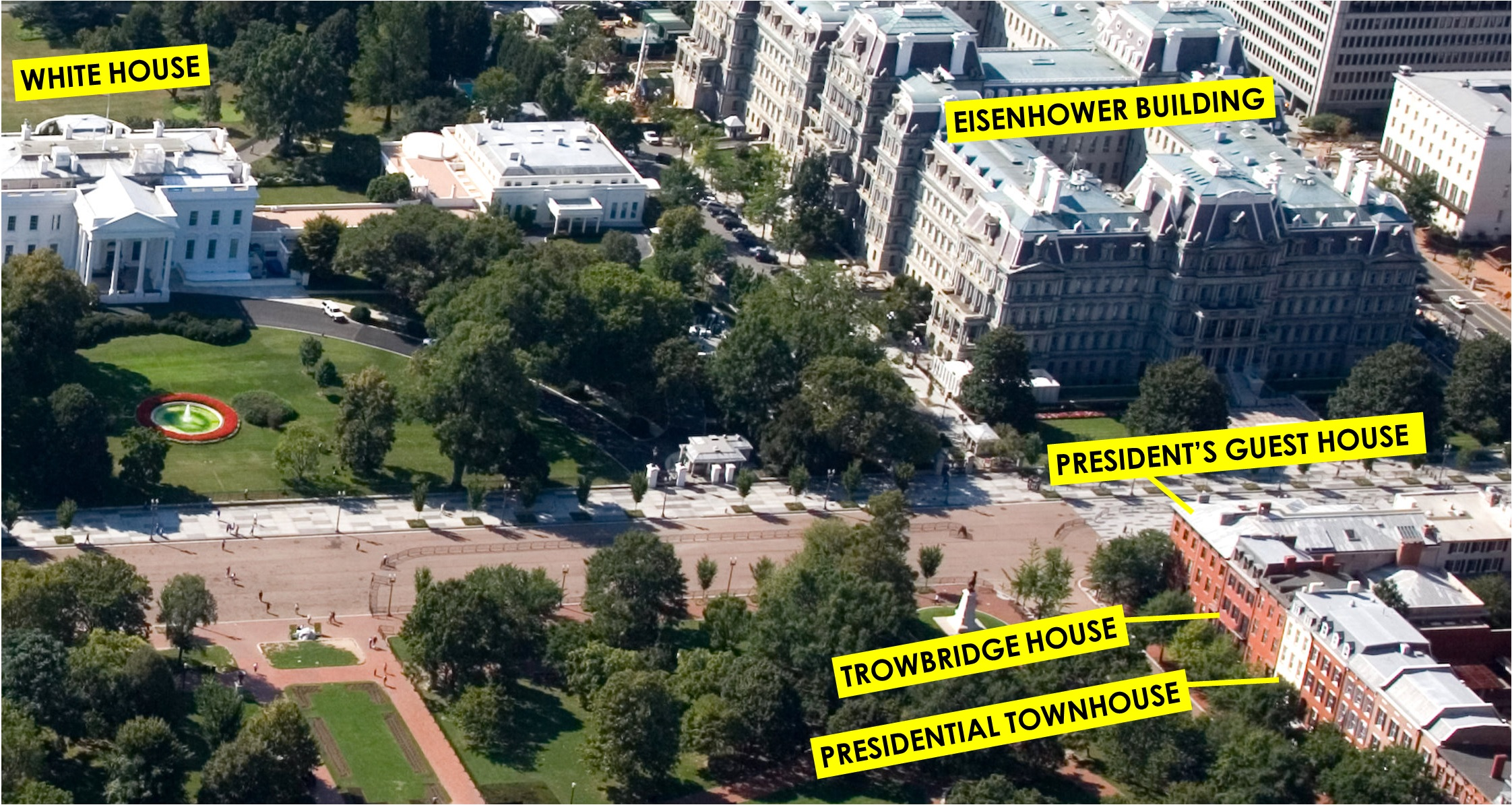
Aerial view of Pennsylvania Avenue, with the President's Guest House in relation to other presidential facilities near President's Park

The President's Guest House is located at the intersection of Pennsylvania Avenue and Jackson Place. Its southern side faces the Eisenhower Executive Office Building, while its eastern side faces Lafayette Square. To its western side along Pennsylvania Avenue, it is adjacent to the Renwick Gallery. Its northern side along Jackson Place abuts Trowbridge House, a separate presidential residence. Immediately behind the gardens of the President's Guest House is the New Executive Office Building. The Ross Garden is an enclosed garden at the rear of the property; it is named after Arthur Ross, who established an endowment to maintain the grounds in perpetuity.

=== Interior spaces ===
The residence consists of 119 rooms, including 14 bedrooms and 35 bathrooms. At 70,000 sq ft (6,500 m^{2}), the President's Guest House is—by floor area—larger than the White House.

==== Basement ====
The Coffelt Memorial Room is located in the basement of the property; it is named after police officer Leslie Coffelt, who was killed while defending Blair House against an attack by Puerto Rican separatists in 1950. The room is used as a day room by the United States Secret Service Uniformed Division detachment assigned to the property. It was dedicated in 1990 and contains a portrait of Coffelt and his framed medals, which were donated by his step-daughter.

==== Notable interior spaces in the Blair–Lee wing ====
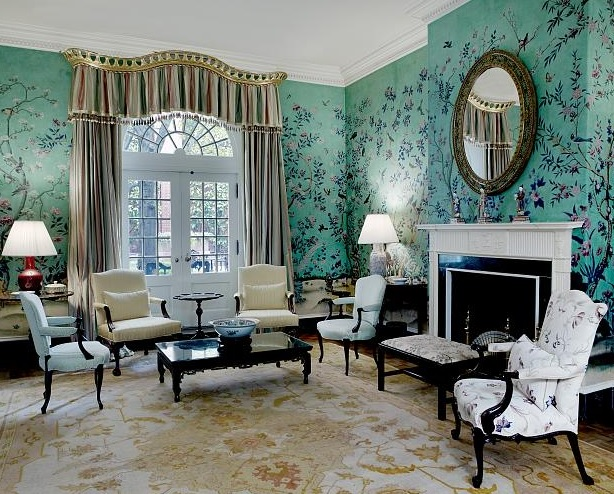
The wallpaper in the Dillon Room, which dates to 1770

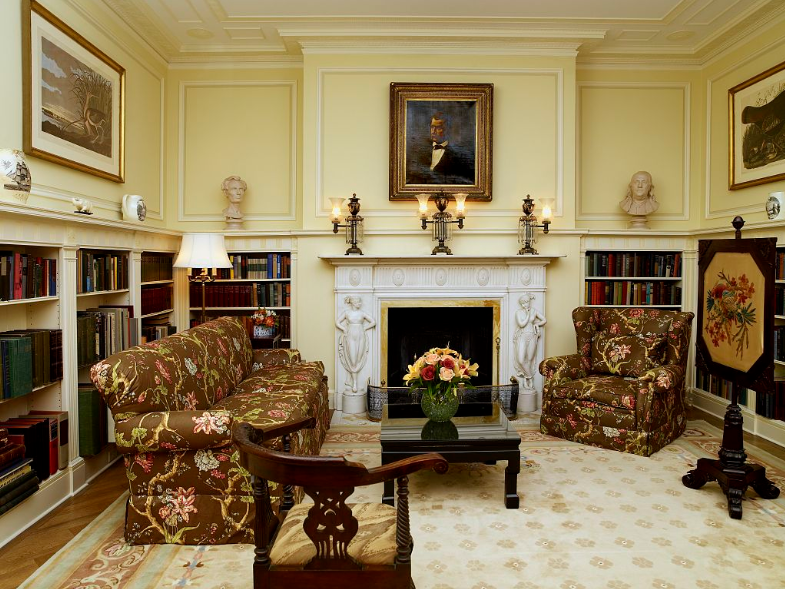
The library at the President's Guest House hosts a collection of books deposited by the home's former guests.

The Dillon Drawing Room, which was originally known as the Lee Drawing Room, was renamed in honor of former U.S. secretary of the treasury C. Douglas Dillon, who donated its unique wallpaper, a Chinese print from 1770. Dillon's wife Phyllis purchased the wallpaper on the recommendation of interior designer Eleanor Brown in 1964. The wallpaper was removed and refurbished between 1982 and 1988. The room is furnished with 18th-century English pieces, along with Chinese vases from the Ming and Qing (Kangxi reign) dynasties. The Dillon Drawing Room is used by resident heads-of-state and chiefs of government to formally receive visitors.

The head-of-state suite comprises the apartments designated for use by the principal resident. It consists of a sitting room, two bedrooms with adjoining dressing rooms, two bathrooms, and a powder room. It is furnished with 18th-century English antiques, which were valued at more than $1 million in 1987.

The small library in the Blair House wing is stocked with approximately 1,500 books. Guests staying at the house traditionally present a book to deposit in the library. A portrait of Francis Blair hangs over the library's fireplace mantle.

The centerpiece of the Lincoln Room is a portrait of Abraham Lincoln painted by 19th-century American portraitist Edward Dalton Marchant; it is one of a number of drawings, paintings, and photographs of Lincoln used to decorate this room. The sitting room in the Blair House wing of the complex was originally used by the Blair family to receive U.S. presidents. In this room in 1861, Montgomery Blair, acting on Lincoln's orders, offered the command of the Union Army to Robert E. Lee, an offer that Lee declined.

In the Truman Study is a fireplace mantel that was originally installed in the White House. It was removed to Blair House during Truman's occupancy, when he used this room as his personal office. In 1987, the mantel was refinished in white enamel with gold-leaf accents. In 2004, before the state funeral of Ronald Reagan, Nancy Reagan used the Truman Study to receive visitors.

==== Notable interior spaces in the Jackson Place wing ====
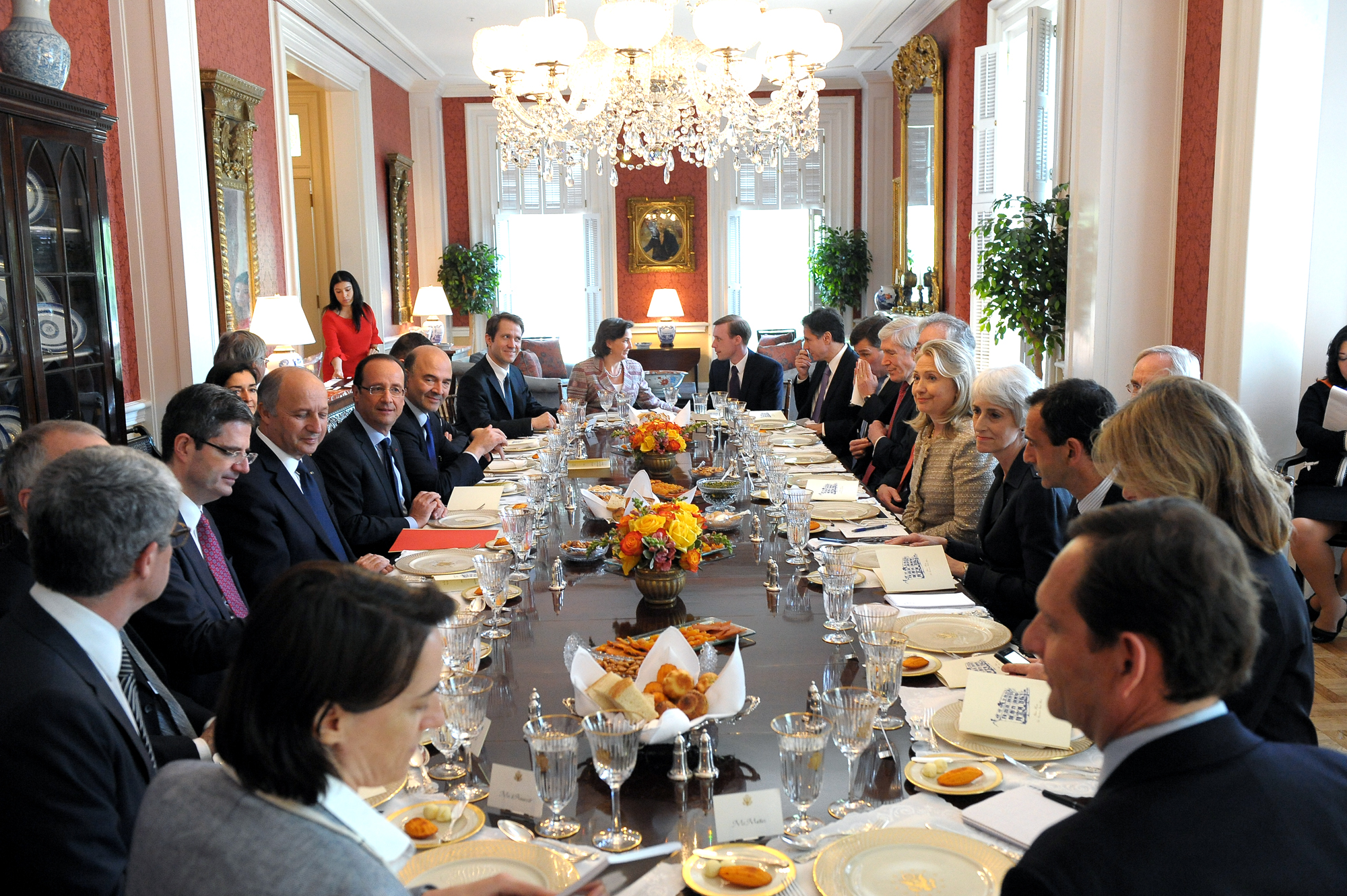
U.S. Secretary of State Hillary Clinton hosts a working lunch for French president François Hollande in the Treaty Room in 2012.

The centerpiece of the Treaty Room in the former Peter Parker House is a 22-seat mahogany table that sits on an 1890 Sarouk rug. A photographic portrait of Empress Dowager Cixi that was presented as a diplomatic gift to the United States by Qing Dynasty China in 1905 hangs in the room.

The Lee Dining Room is used for formal banquets. It is lit by an 1825 Irish crystal chandelier. One hundred place settings of fine china and 150 place settings of sterling silver flatware were acquired from Tiffany & Co. in 1988 for use in the dining room.

== Management ==
=== Administration and staff ===
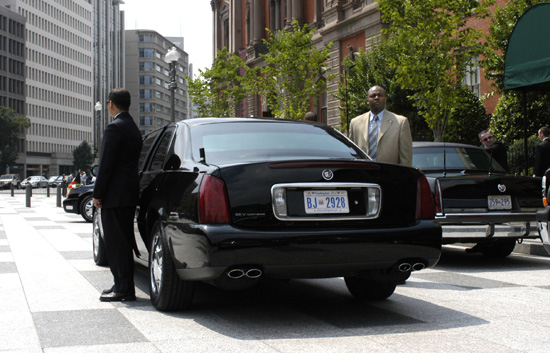
Two special agents of the Diplomatic Security Service guard a motorcade vehicle outside the President's Guest House in 2005.

The President's Guest House is owned by the U.S. government and is managed by the office of the chief of protocol of the United States in cooperation with the Diplomatic Security Service, the Department of State's Bureau of Administration, and the Department of State's Office of Fine Arts. Maintenance and operation of the facility are paid for by the U.S. government. The Blair House Foundation, a private 501(c)(3) organization, finances the preservation of historic furnishings and art. The board of trustees of the Blair House Foundation is chaired by Sarah Perot with Selwa Roosevelt serving as Chairman Emeritus.

The house is operated by full-time staff who are non-residential but customarily live-in during periods of occupancy by a visiting dignitary. In 2001, the staff included a general manager, an assistant general manager, two butlers, a doorman, four housekeepers, two chefs, a launderer, a curator, and several maintenance workers. Security for the facility is provided by the United States Secret Service during periods of occupancy by foreign heads of state and chiefs of government. During visits by other guests such as foreign ministers, the Diplomatic Security Service assumes the leading role.

=== Protocol ===
When a visiting foreign dignitary is in residence at the President's Guest House, the dignitary's official standard is displayed on the building's flagpole. In cases where dignitaries have no official standards, the dignitary's national flag is displayed instead. If two or more foreign visitors of equal rank are visiting Washington, neither is invited to stay at the President's Guest House to avoid the perception of favoritism.

== See also ==
- Architecture of Washington, D.C.
- Blair House Agreement
- Diplomatic Reception Rooms (rooms at the Harry S Truman Building—the State Department's headquarters—used to receive dignitaries visiting the United States)
- List of National Historic Landmarks in Washington, D.C.
