= Acorn Park =

Acorn-shaped gazebo, park, Maryland, US

Acorn Urban Park
- Acorn Park
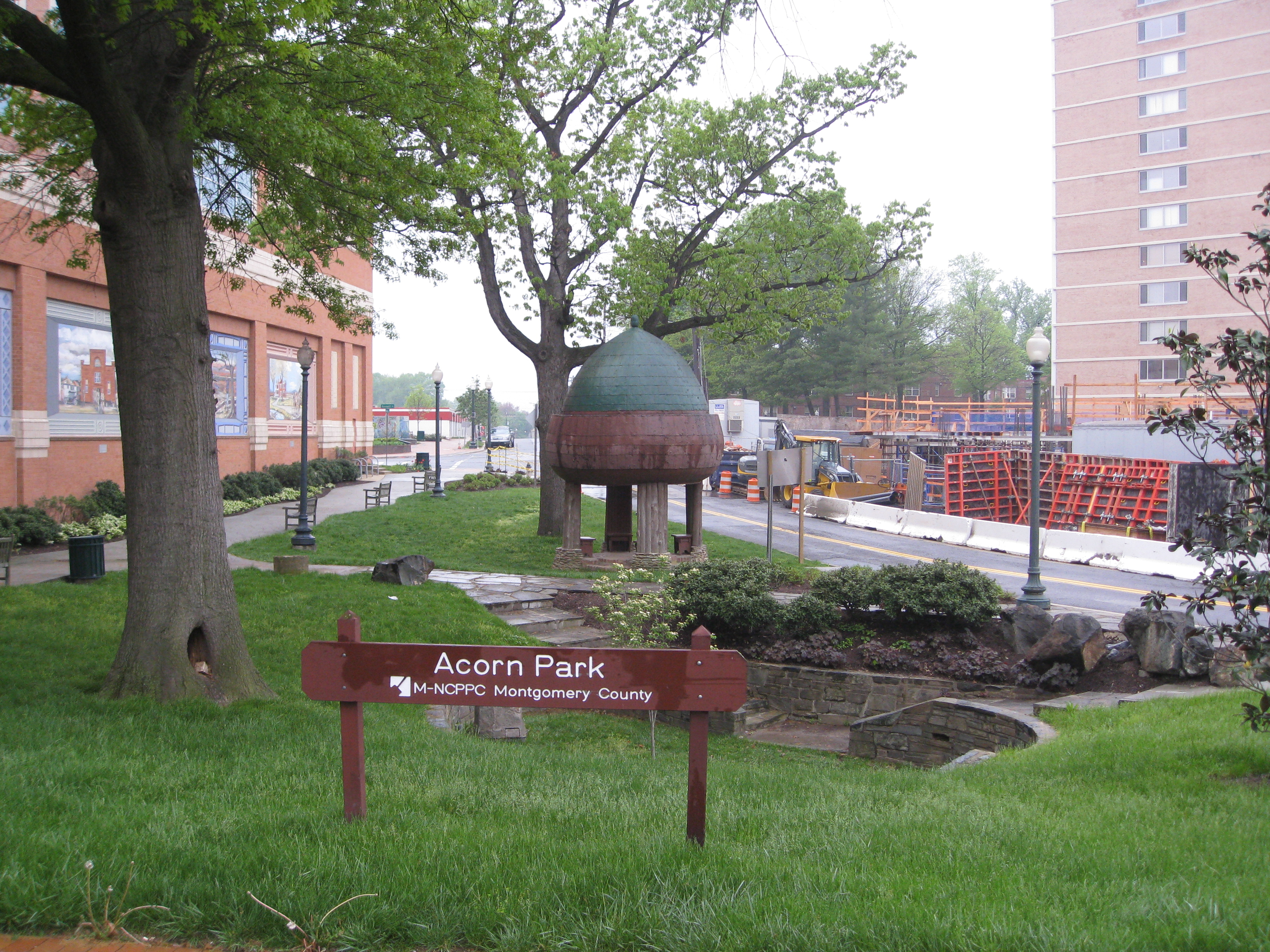
- Acorn Park in 2008
- Interactive map of Acorn Urban Park
- Type: Urban park
- Location: 8060 Newell Street; Silver Spring, Maryland 20910; United States
- Coordinates: 38°59′23″N 77°01′44″W
- Area: 0.1247 acres (0.050 hectares)
- Established: 1942; 84 years ago
- Etymology: Acorn–shaped gazebo
- Owner: Maryland-National Capital Park and Planning Commission (M–NCPPC)
- Administrator: Montgomery Parks
- Open: Sunrise to sunset
- Public transit: Silver Spring Metro; Brunswick Line; Metrobus; Ride On
- Website: MontgomeryParks.org/Parks-and-Trails/Acorn-Urban-Park

Acorn Park is a 0.1247-acre (500-square-metre) urban park in downtown Silver Spring, Maryland, which features an acorn-shaped gazebo and an artificial grotto. The site is historically significant as it is thought to be the location of the "mica-flecked spring" that in 1840 inspired Francis Preston Blair to name his estate "Silver Spring".

Acorn Park is located at the intersection of East-West Highway and Newell Street.

== History ==
The gazebo in Acorn Park was constructed in 1842 by Benjamin C. King. Francis Blair's son-in-law, Samuel Phillips Lee, had the stone grotto built at the site of the spring in 1894. It originally included a statue of a Greek nymph. The park land was purchased by the Maryland-National Capital Park and Planning Commission in 1942 and was refurbished and rededicated in 1955. A small additional tract of land was acquired by M-NCPPC in 1997, to make the current 0.1247 acres (0.05 ha).

== Gallery ==
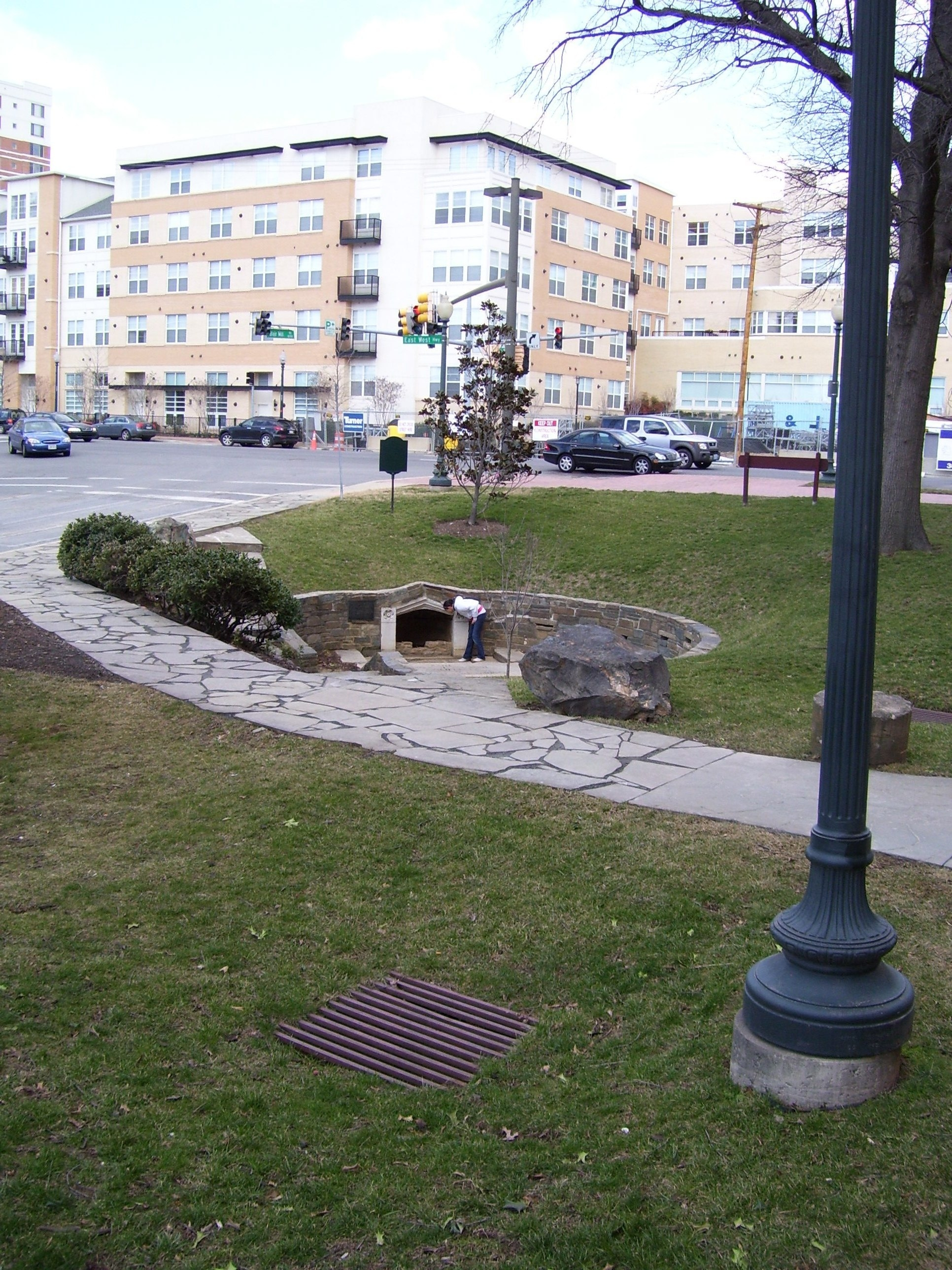
A view of the park showing the "Grotto."

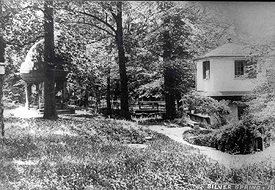
Acorn Park in 1917– the acorn-shaped gazebo is visible at left.

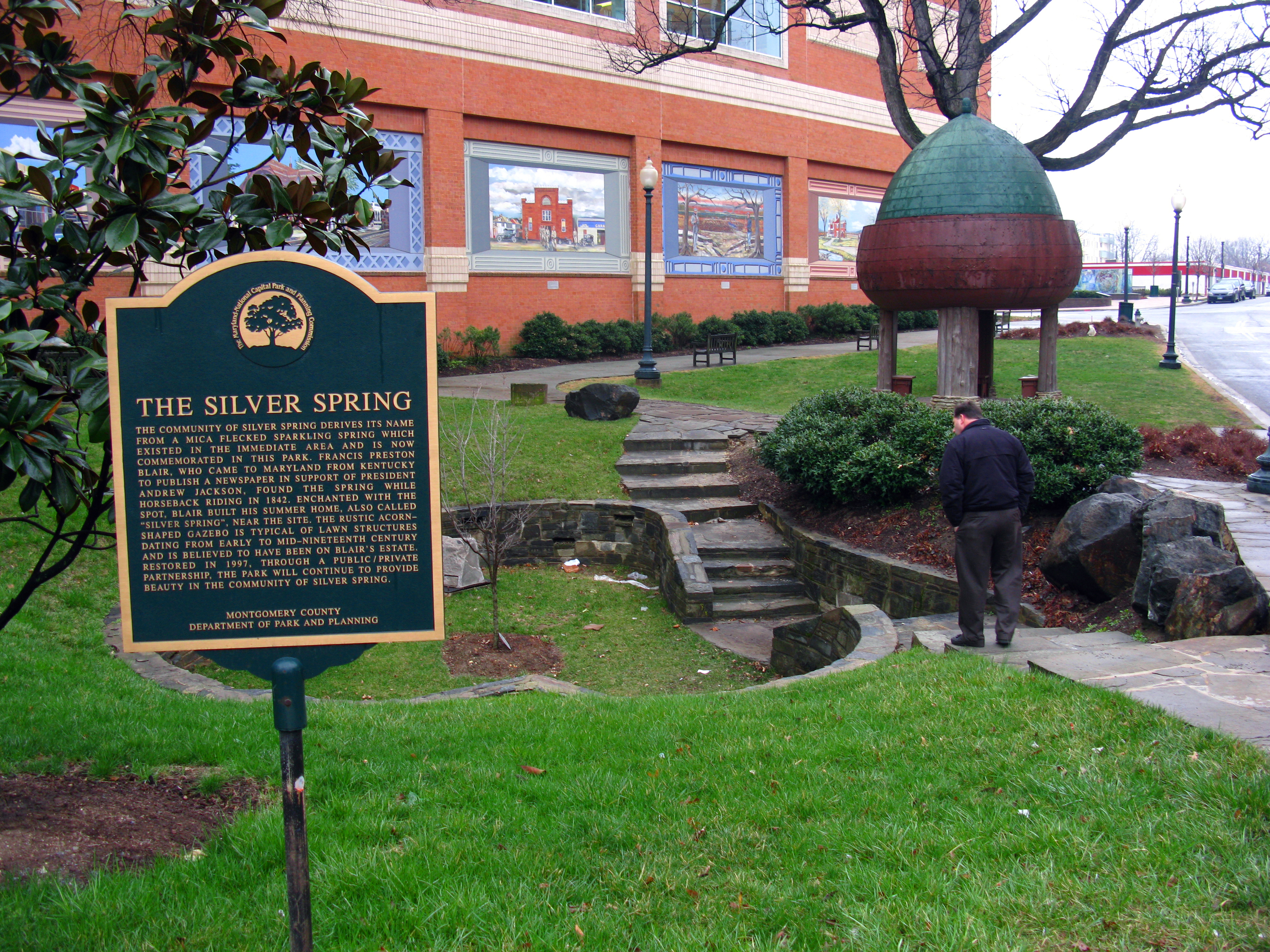
The commemorative plaque details the founding event.
