= Washington City Orphan Asylum =

Orphanage in the United States

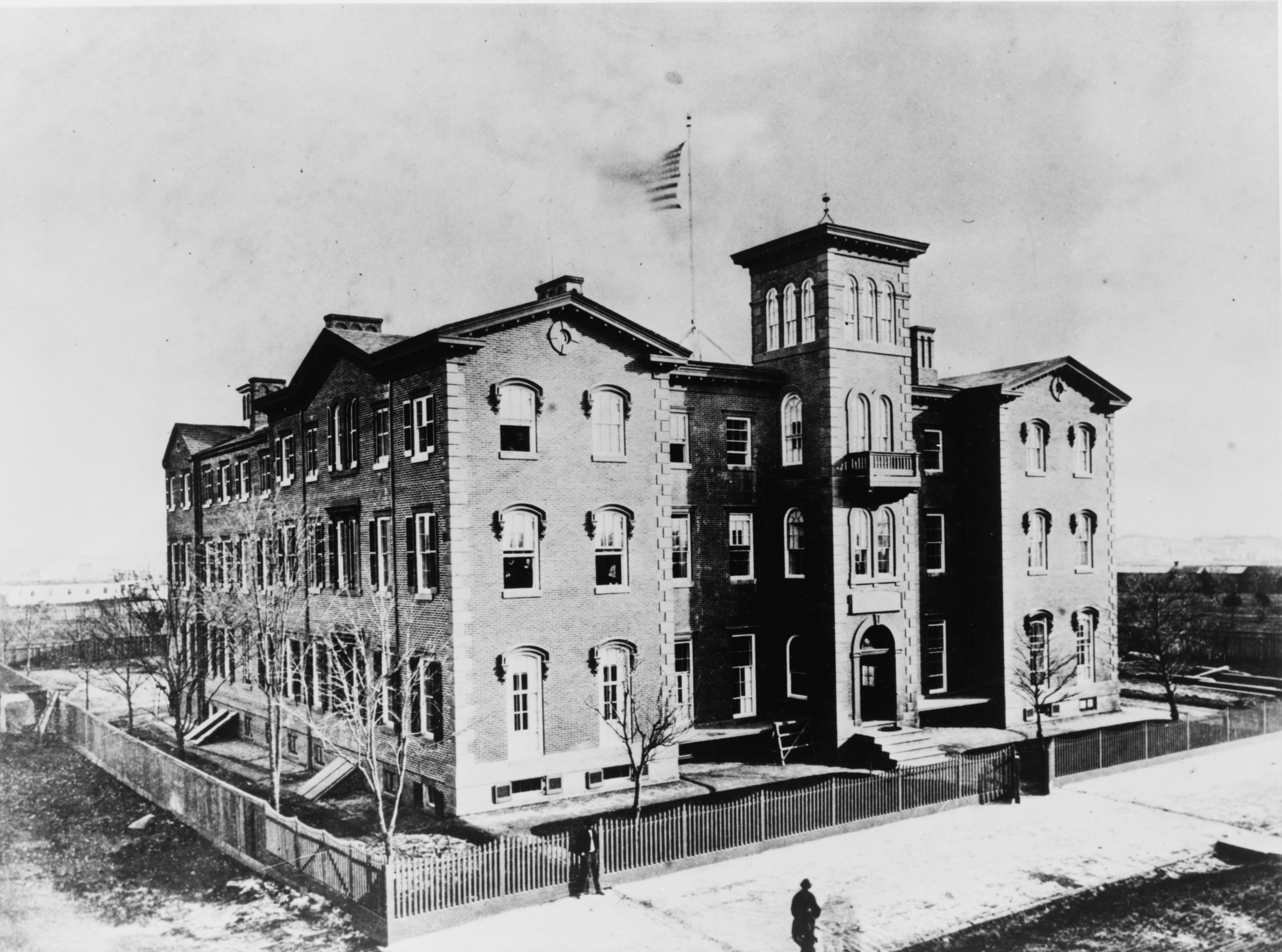
Washington City Orphan Asylum, 1860, Library of Congress

Washington City Orphan Asylum, also called The Protestant Male and Female Orphan Asylum, was an orphanage established in Washington, D.C., for homeless children after the War of 1812. In 1935, it became the Hillcrest Children's Village and was moved to new facilities in the city.

== History ==
The Washington City Orphan Asylum was established after the War of 1812 due to the number of homeless boys and girls in the District of Columbia. The Washington Orphan Society was established by a Federal Charter by Congress in 1815, with Dolley Madison, the First Lady of the United States, elected as the first directress. Madison and Marcia Van Ness were co-founders of the organization. Elizabeth Blair Lee was a manager of the organization for 57 years, and the directoress for 44 years.

Taking in children from Virginia, Washington, D.C., and Maryland, it served children who were neglected, whose parents gave them up, or whose parents died. Besides offering shelter and food, children received educational and vocational training. The Protestant organization's first building was located near Pennsylvania Avenue on 10th Street NW. In 1828, a new building was built on H Street.

During the Civil War, the orphanage took in children from northern and southern states. In 1866, a new three-story red brick building was constructed at the southeast corner of 14th Street and S Streets Northwest for the Washington City Orphan Asylum. (Note: After the asylum moved to the new building, the State Department moved from the Northeast Executive Building into the former asylum building on 14th Street on November 1, 1866. The Northeast Executive Building was torn down to make room for a north wing to the Treasury Department Building.) The asylum changed its charter and its name in 1935. It then became the Hillcrest Children's Village located in new facilities at Van Ness Street and Nebraska Avenue. It currently is known as Hillcrest Children and Family Center, with two locations (Rhode Island Ave NW and MLK Jr Ave SE).
