= Samuel Phillips Lee =

United States Navy admiral

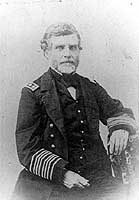
- Samuel Phillips Lee, U.S. Navy Rear Admiral
- Born: February 13, 1812; Fairfax County, Virginia, U.S.
- Died: June 5, 1897 (aged 85); Silver Spring, Maryland, U.S.
- Spouse: Elizabeth Blair (m. 1843)
- Relatives: Lee family
- Military career
- Allegiance: United States
- Branch: United States Navy
- Service years: 1825–1873
- Rank: Rear admiral
- Commands: USS Vandalia; USS Oneida; North Atlantic Blockading Squadron; Mississippi River Squadron
- Conflicts: Mexican–American War; American Civil War

Samuel Phillips Lee (February 13, 1812 – June 5, 1897) was an officer of the United States Navy. In the American Civil War, he took part in the New Orleans campaign before commanding the North Atlantic Blockading Squadron, covering the coastlines and inland waters of Virginia and North Carolina, and finally the Mississippi River Squadron. As a cousin of Robert E. Lee, his refusal to join the Confederates' side by remaining loyal to the Union demonstrated how the war had divided families. Lee married Elizabeth Blair the daughter of Francis P. Blair Sr., and their house in Washington is now the president's official guest house.

== Early life and education ==
Lee was born on February 13, 1812, at the Sully Plantation in Fairfax County, Virginia, to Francis Lightfoot Lee II and Jane Fitzgerald. He was the grandson of Richard Henry Lee, great-nephew of Francis Lightfoot Lee I, brother-in-law of Francis Preston Blair Jr., and of Montgomery Blair, and was third cousin of Robert E. Lee.

== Career ==
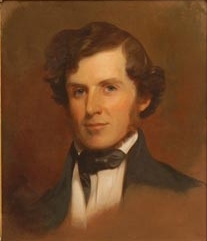
Portrait of Lee by Thomas Sully, 1845

He was appointed a midshipman in the U.S. Navy in November 1825 and subsequently saw extensive service at sea, including combat action during the Mexican–American War and exploration, surveying, and oceanographic duty.

At the outbreak of the American Civil War in 1861, Lee held the rank of commander and was captain of the sloop-of-war Vandalia in the East Indies, sailing her home on his own initiative to join the blockade of the Southern coast. Commander Lee commanded the new steam sloop Oneida during the New Orleans campaign and subsequent operations on the Mississippi River in the first half of 1862. David Farragut had given Commander Lee smaller vessels to ascend the Mississippi River as far as Vicksburg shortly after the naval battle at New Orleans to cut off Confederate supplies from the west and then later the command of five larger vessels to effect the surrender of Vicksburg which Farragut and others assumed would be forthcoming. The Confederates rebuffed Lee's offer of surrender and ordered civilians to evacuate the river city in view of a naval bombardment which never came. Lee was replaced by Captain James Palmer.

When asked about his loyalty, Lee famously replied, "When I find the word Virginia in my commission I will join the Confederacy." This quote is often referenced by historians in contrast to the actions of his cousin Robert E. Lee, to show how the war divided families.

In September 1862, Lee was ordered to Norfolk and assumed command of the North Atlantic Blockading Squadron with the rank of Acting rear admiral. Initially, he noted that the Union blockade of the ports of Norfolk and upriver Richmond seemed effective, and recommended` the Army consolidate its posts on the Peninsula. However, the army maintained garrisons from Fort Monroe to Williamsburg and Union boats patrolled the James River. Adm. Lee continued in command for over two years, including during CSA General Longstreet's advance against Suffolk in 1863. This forces were responsible for the blockade of the North Carolina coast and operations on North Carolina and Virginia inland waters, all areas of very active combat between Union and Confederate forces. In September 1863 with some supplies being scarce, the admiral advised the naval station at Wilmington, North Carolina that a single small vessel could be used for patrols of that port. Acting Rear Admiral Lee transferred to the command of the Mississippi River Squadron in October 1864 and led it to the end of the Civil War in 1865.

Reverting to his permanent rank of captain after the Civil War, Lee extensively served in the Washington, D.C., area. He was promoted to rear admiral in 1870 and retired from active service in February 1873.

== Personal life ==
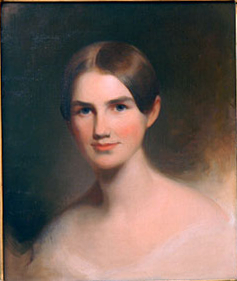
Elizabeth Blair Lee, portrait by Thomas Sully, when she was 19

Lee married Elizabeth Blair on April 27, 1843. During the Civil War, he was away for long periods. Elizabeth's letters to her husband describe wartime life in her homes of Washington, D.C., and Silver Spring, Maryland. Her letters are published in the book Wartime Washington : the Civil War letters of Elizabeth Blair Lee. Lee became well known in Washington society due to the influence of his wife, the former Elizabeth Blair of Maryland.

In 1859, Lee's father-in-law, Francis Preston Blair, built a house for Lee and his wife Elizabeth next door to his own. These two houses, within a block of the White House in Washington, D.C., were later combined into one house and became the property of the U.S. government. Today they are the Blair-Lee House, used by the president as his guest house. Upon retirement, he moved to the family home in Silver Spring, Maryland, where he died on June 5 or June 7, 1897.

== Legacy ==
Two U.S. Navy ships have been named in honor of Rear Admiral Samuel Phillips Lee, the destroyer S. P. Lee (DD-310), which was commissioned in October 1920 and lost by stranding in September 1923, and the research vessel USNS S. P. Lee (T-AGS-31) (later T-AG-192), which was in naval service between 1968 and 1974.

Military offices
Preceded by Charles H. Poor	Commander-in-Chief, North Atlantic Squadron; June 1870–May 1873	Succeeded by Gustavus H. Scott
