= Montgomery Blair =

American lawyer and politician (1813–1883)

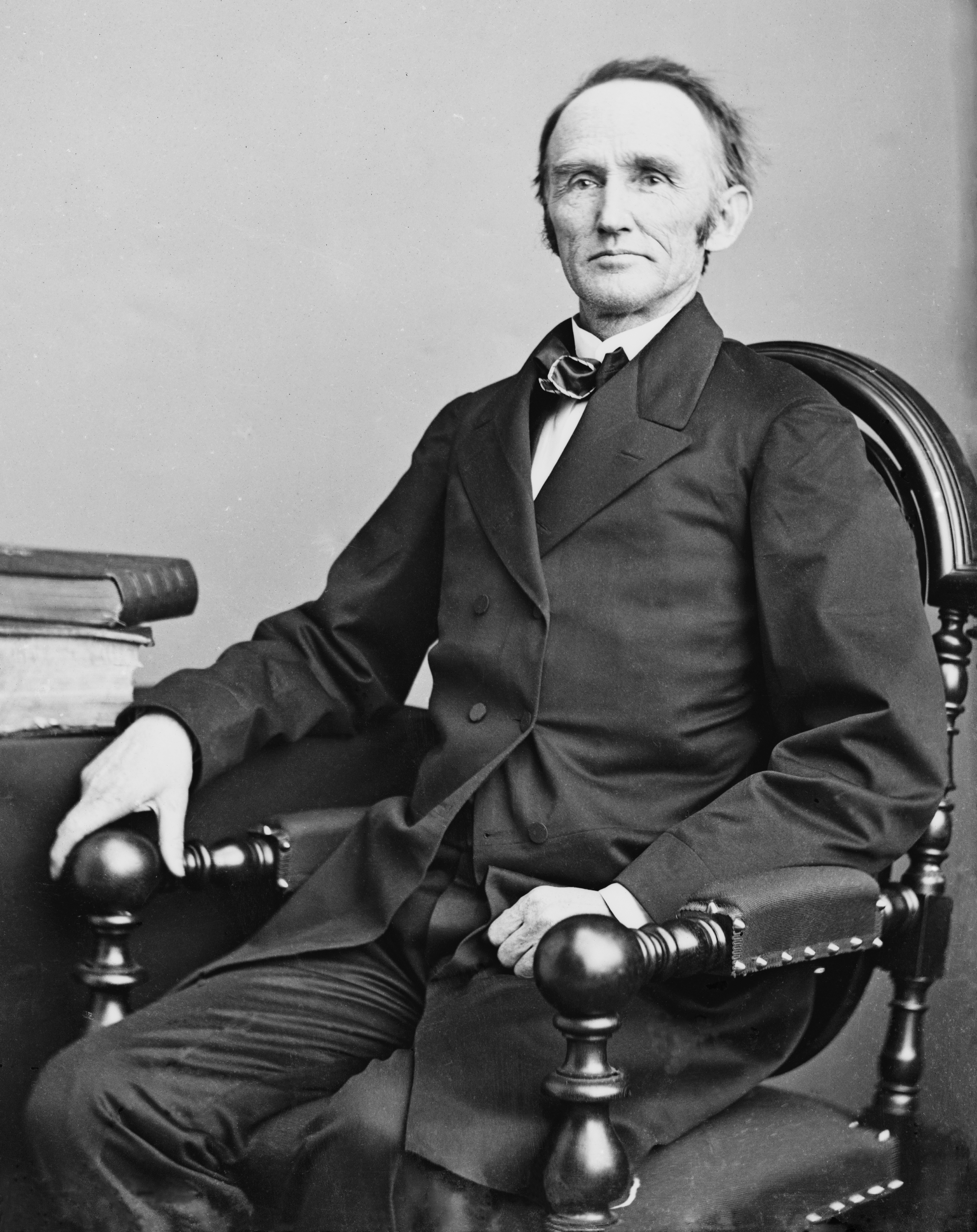
- Blair, c. 1855-1865

20th United States Postmaster General
- In office March 5, 1861 – September 24, 1864
- President: Abraham Lincoln
- Preceded by: Horatio King
- Succeeded by: William Dennison

Personal details
- Born: May 10, 1813 Franklin County, Kentucky, U.S.
- Died: July 27, 1883 (aged 70) Silver Spring, Maryland, U.S.
- Resting place: Rock Creek Cemetery; Washington, D.C., U.S.
- Party: Democratic (Before 1854; 1865–1883); Republican (1854–1865)
- Spouse(s): Caroline Buckner (m. 1836; died 1844) Mary Woodbury
- Children: 4
- Parent: Francis Preston Blair (father)
- Relatives: Francis Preston Blair Jr. (brother); Elizabeth Blair Lee (sister); Blair Lee I (nephew); Montgomery Clift (alleged great-grandson)
- Education: United States Military Academy (BS); Transylvania University (LLB)

Military service
- Allegiance: United States
- Branch/service: United States Army
- Years of service: 1835–1836
- Rank: Second Lieutenant
- Battles/wars: Seminole Wars

Montgomery Blair (May 10, 1813 – July 27, 1883) was an American politician and lawyer from Maryland. He served in the Lincoln administration cabinet as Postmaster-General from 1861 to 1864, during the Civil War. He was the son of Francis Preston Blair, elder brother of Francis Preston Blair Jr. and cousin of B. Gratz Brown.

== Early life and education ==
Blair was born in Franklin County, Kentucky, site of the state capital of Frankfort. His father, Francis Preston Blair, Sr., was editor of The Washington Globe and a prominent figure in the Democratic Party during the Jacksonian era. As a boy, Montgomery "often listened to the talk of his father and Andrew Jackson."

Blair graduated from the United States Military Academy at West Point. After a year of service in the Seminole War, however, he left the U.S. Army, married Caroline Rebecca Buckner of Virginia, and began studying law at Transylvania University in Lexington, Kentucky.

== Career ==
Blair began to practice law in 1839 in St. Louis, Missouri. He served as U.S. District Attorney from 1839 to 1843 and later as judge of the court of common pleas from 1843 to 1849. After the death of his first wife, Carolina, in 1844, he later married Mary Elizabeth Woodbury, daughter of Levi Woodbury.

Blair moved to Maryland in 1852 and devoted himself to the practice of law, principally in the Supreme Court of the United States. He was United States Solicitor in the Court of Claims from 1855 to 1858.

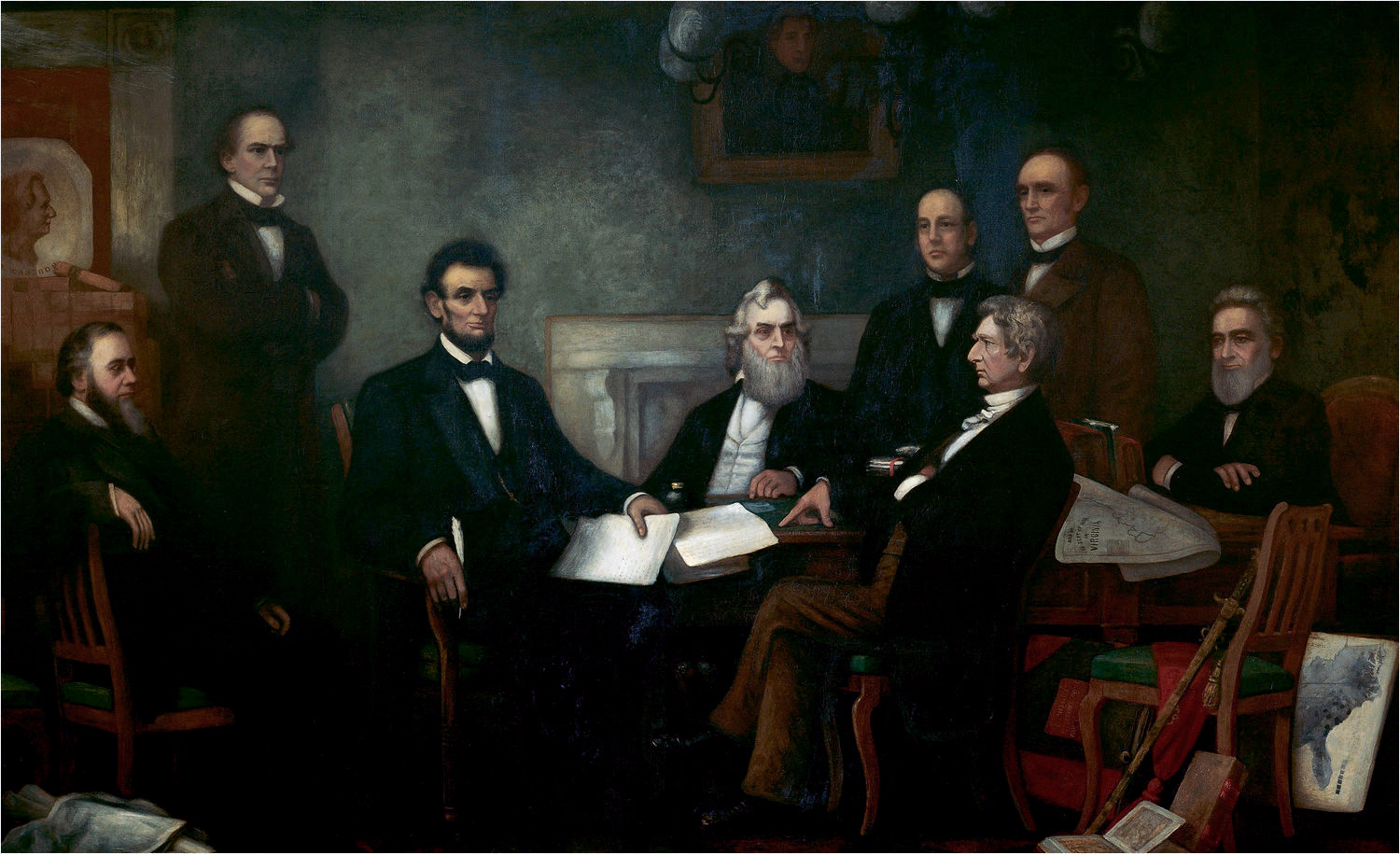
First Reading of the Emancipation Proclamation of President Lincoln by Francis Bicknell Carpenter (1864) (Clickable image—use cursor to identify.)

The Blairs, like many other nationalist Democrats, but unusual for politicians from the border states, had abandoned the Democratic Party in the wake of the Kansas–Nebraska Act and had been among the founding leaders of the new Republican Party. Four years after Blair switched political parties, President Buchanan removed Blair from his position as Solicitor of the United States Court of Claims in 1858.

While the Blairs, as a family, were often characterized as conservative on the issue of slavery, Blair notably served as counsel for Dred Scott, in association with George T. Curtis, when the enslaved African-American took his case to the Supreme Court in 1857. Scott was the slave of an U.S. Army doctor who took his enslaved servant along for prolonged stays in free territory.

On Scott's behalf, Blair argued that the time the black man had spent in the free state of Illinois and in Minnesota, free territory since the Northwest Ordinance of 1787, made him a free man. The ruling by Court's majority against Scott's right to freedom is often cited as one of the contributing causes of the American Civil War. Writing for the majority, Chief Justice Roger B. Taney affirmed that the black man had no rights "that the white man was bound to respect" and that black slaves could not be considered American citizens despite having been born in the U.S. This landmark decision was denounced as a step toward the "nationalization" of slavery by Lincoln and others opposed to the expansion of that institution. Conservative as he may have been on other aspects of the slavery issue, Blair's work in the case of Dred Scott vs. Sandford suggests a willingness to embrace more progressive viewpoints.

In 1860, Blair took an active part in support of Abraham Lincoln's presidential campaign. After his election, Lincoln appointed Blair to his cabinet as Postmaster General in 1861. Lincoln expected Blair, who advocated taking a firm stance with the southern states, to help balance more conciliatory members of his cabinet. While Postmaster-General, Blair instituted a uniform rate of postage and free delivery in cities, began the sale of money orders by post offices to reduce the mailing of currency to reduce post office robberies, and also started the use of railway mail cars, an idea which had been suggested by George B. Armstrong (d. 1871), of Chicago, general superintendent of the United States railway mail service from 1860 to his death.

Blair called for the First International Postal Conference, which was held in Paris in 1863 and began the process that led to the Universal Postal Union.

In September 1864, Lincoln accepted an earlier offer by Blair to resign. Lincoln's action may have been a response to the hostility of the Radical Republican faction, which believed Blair's retirement should follow the withdrawal of John C. Frémont as a candidate in the 1864 presidential election. Blair told his wife that Lincoln acted "from the best motives" and that "it is for the best all around." After he left the cabinet, Blair still campaigned for Lincoln's re-election in 1864, and Lincoln and the Blair family retained close ties.

== Post-war ==
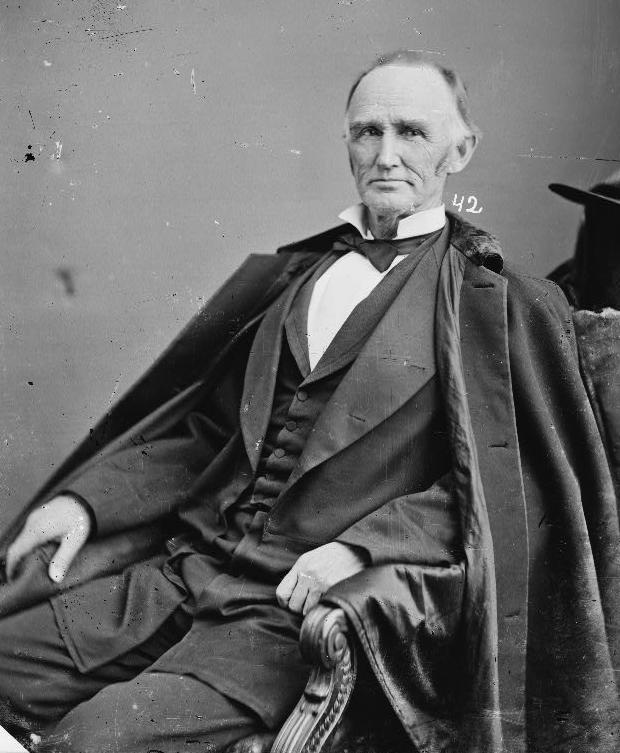
Montgomery Blair in his post-war life

Differing from the Republican Party on the Reconstruction policy, Blair gave his adherence to the Democratic Party after the Civil War, along with his brother, Francis Preston Blair Jr., who was the Democratic vice presidential candidate in 1868.

In 1876, Blair, along with Matthew H. Carpenter and Jeremiah S. Black, was counsel to Secretary of War William W. Belknap during the House of Representatives investigation into the Trader post scandal. Blair asked the House Investigation Committee chaired by Hiester Clymer to drop the charges against Belknap if the latter resigned office. Clymer, however, declined Blair's offer.

Belknap was impeached by the House of Representatives for receiving illicit payments from the Fort Sill trader post on the American frontier as Secretary of War. Belknap had been granted sole power by Congress to choose sutlers to operate lucrative trader posts that sold supplies to U.S. soldiers and Indians. Belknap resigned over the scandal and was acquitted in a United States Senate trial during the summer of 1876. Many senators did not believe that Congress could convict a private citizen, but the Senate passed a resolution that stated Congress had that power.

In 1882, Blair unsuccessfully ran for U.S. Representative from Maryland's sixth district.

Blair's 600-acre (2.4 km^{2}) manor in present-day Silver Spring, Maryland was named Falkland. In 1864, during the Civil War, Confederate General Jubal Early occupied Silver Spring before the Battle of Fort Stevens. After the engagement, fleeing Confederate soldiers burnt the mansion.

== Death ==
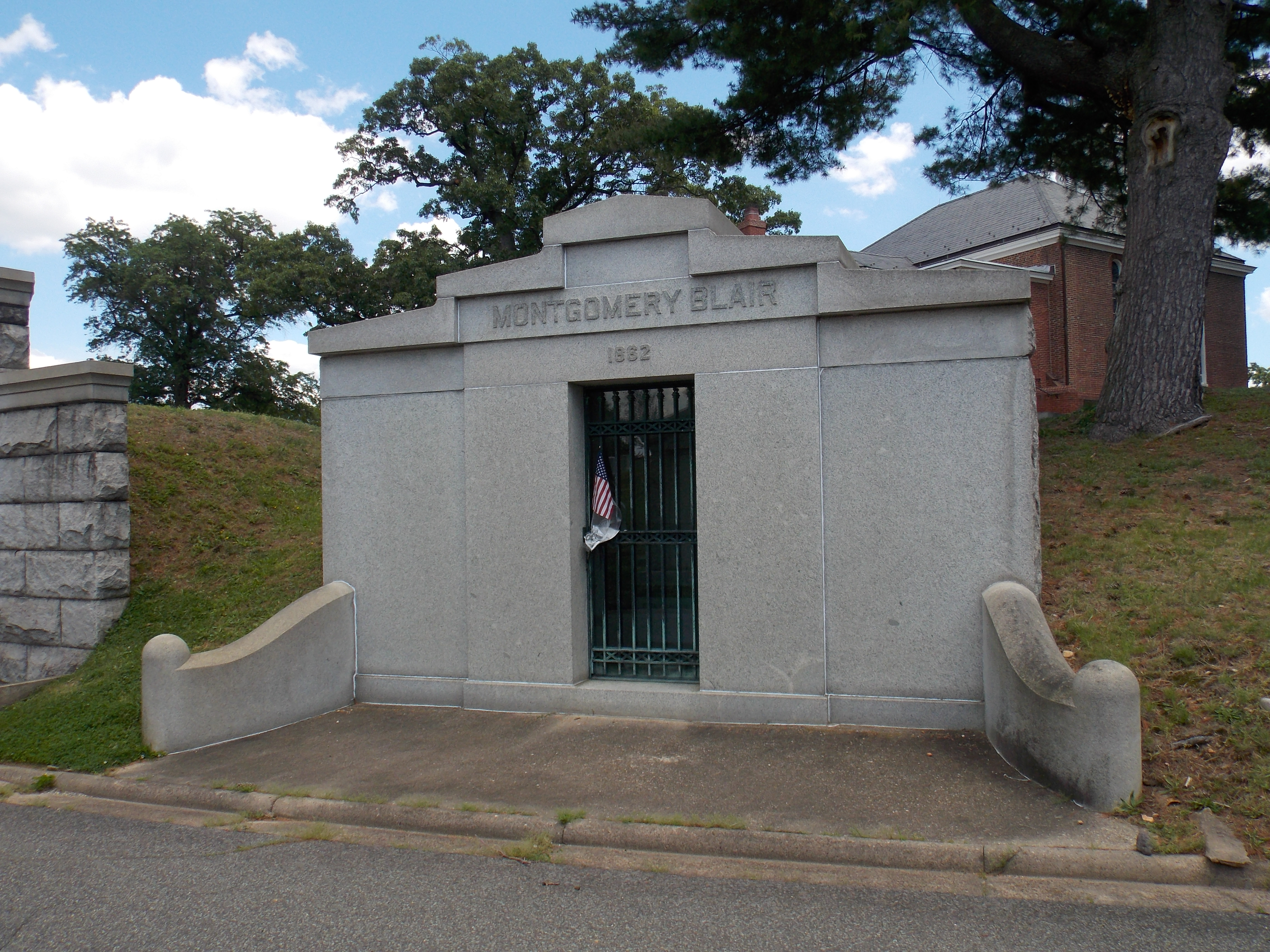
The Montgomery Blair mausoleum in Rock Creek Cemetery

After several years afflicted with "inflammation of the spinal membranes," he died in Silver Spring, Maryland on July 27, 1883.

Funeral services were held at Rock Creek Church, and he was buried at Rock Creek Cemetery. In memory of Blair, the United States Post Office closed on July 30, 1883.

== Personal life ==
Blair's first wife was Caroline Rebecca Buckner of Virginia; they married in 1836, and she died in 1844. His second wife was Mary Woodbury, a daughter of Levi Woodbury. They had one daughter, Minnie Blair, and three sons, Woodbury Blair, Gist Blair, and Montgomery Blair Jr., all of whom became attorneys.

== In popular culture ==
- Blair is portrayed by actor Lew Temple in the 2012 film Saving Lincoln.
- In the 2012 film Lincoln, Blair is inaccurately portrayed by actor Byron Jennings. In the film, Blair is incorrectly depicted as being opposed to the 13th Amendment, referring to it as "rash and dangerous." In reality, though Blair began the Civil War more concerned with punishing secessionists and restoring the union than abolishing slavery, he accepted the abolition of slavery as necessary despite disliking abolitionists by 1863.
- To commemorate the centennial of the First International Postal Conference, Blair's portrait appeared on a U.S. airmail stamp, Scott catalogue C66, was issued in 1963.

== Works ==
- Speech on the Causes of the Rebellion (1864)

== Legacy ==
Montgomery Blair High School in Silver Spring, Maryland is named after Blair.

Political offices
Preceded by Horatio King	United States Postmaster General; Served under: Abraham Lincoln; 1861 – 1864	Succeeded by William Dennison, Jr.
