= 1826 Vermont gubernatorial election =

- September 5, 1826
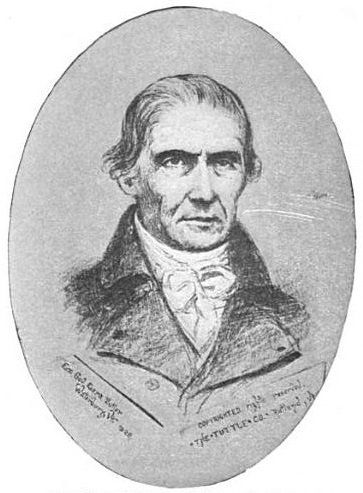

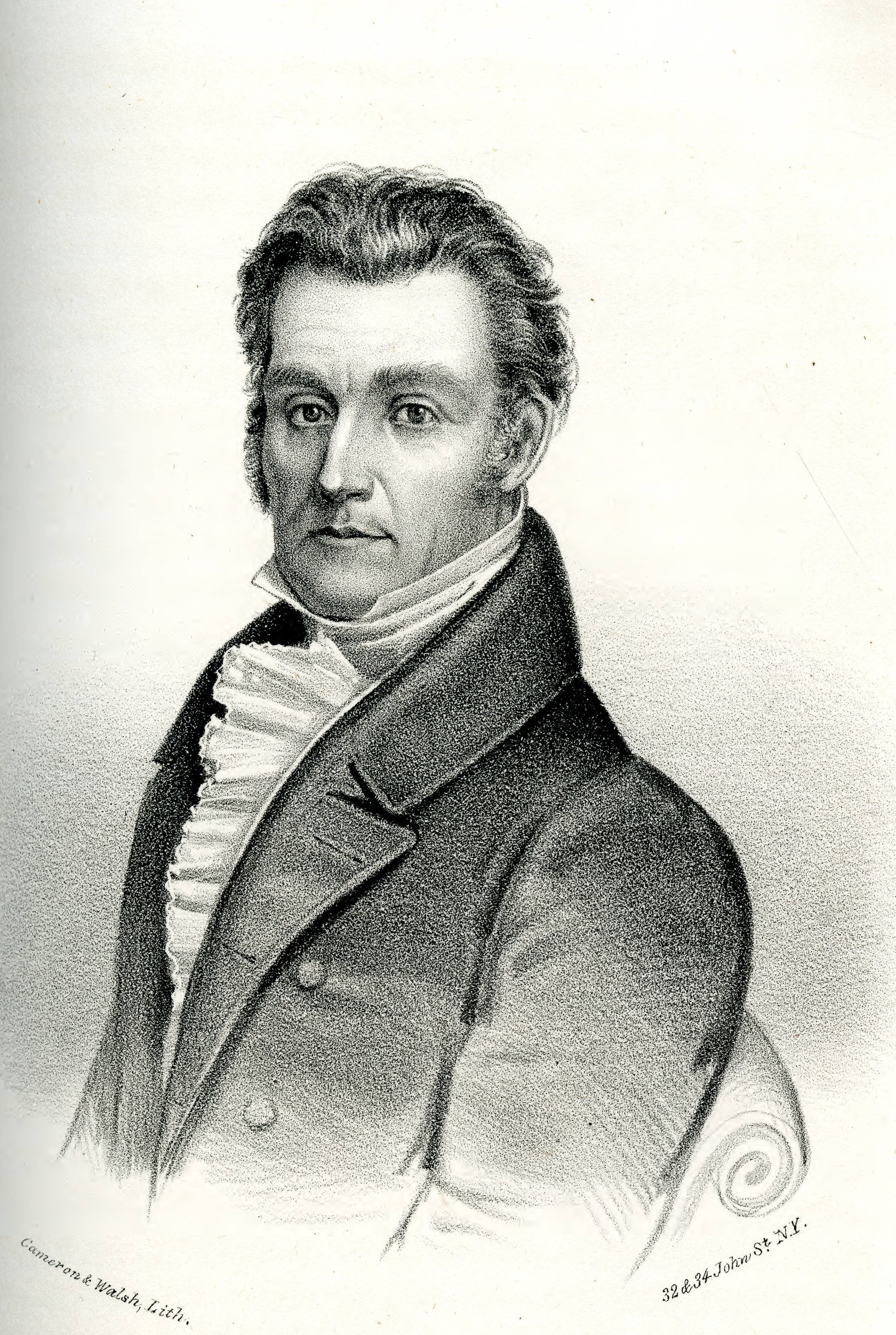
Nominee	Ezra Butler	Joel Doolittle
Party	Adams	Jacksonian
Popular vote	8,966	3,157
Percentage	63.32%	22.29%
- County results Butler: 50–60% 60–70% 70–80% 80–90% 90–100% Doolittle: 40–50% 50–60%
Governor before election
Cornelius P. Van Ness
Democratic-Republican
Elected Governor
Ezra Butler
Adams

The 1826 Vermont gubernatorial election took place on September 5, 1826. It resulted in the election of Ezra Butler to a one-year term as governor.

The Vermont General Assembly met in Montpelier on October 12. The Vermont House of Representatives appointed a committee to review the votes of the freemen of Vermont for governor, lieutenant governor, treasurer, and members of the governor's council. The committee determined that Ezra Butler had won a one-year term.

In the election for lieutenant governor, the committee determined that Democratic-Republican Aaron Leland had won election to a fifth one-year term. Newspapers of the time reported the vote totals as: Leland, 7,749 (61.9%); Henry Olin, 4,331 (34.7%); Scattering, 431 (3.4%).

Benjamin Swan had no opposition for election to a one-year term as treasurer, his twenty-seventh. Though he had nominally been a Federalist, Swan was usually endorsed by the Democratic-Republicans and even after the demise of the Federalist Party he was frequently unopposed.

The vote totals in the governor's race were reported as follows:

== Results ==
1826 Vermont gubernatorial election
Party	Candidate	Votes	%
Adams	Ezra Butler	8,966	63.32
Jacksonian	Joel Doolittle	3,157	22.29
Write-in		2,037	14.39
Total votes		14,160	100.0
