= 1825 Vermont gubernatorial election =

- September 6, 1825
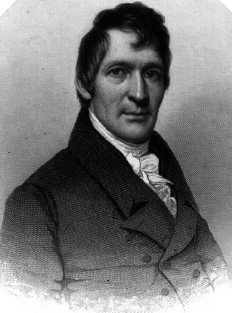
| Nominee | Cornelius P. Van Ness |
| Party | Democratic-Republican |
| Popular vote | 12,229 |
| Percentage | 98.43% |
- County results Van Ness: 90–100%
Governor before election
Cornelius P. Van Ness
Democratic-Republican
Elected Governor
Cornelius P. Van Ness
Democratic-Republican

The 1825 Vermont gubernatorial election took place on September 6, 1825. It resulted in the election of Cornelius P. Van Ness to a one-year term as governor.

The Vermont General Assembly met in Montpelier on October 13. The Vermont House of Representatives appointed a committee to review the votes of the freemen of Vermont for governor, lieutenant governor, treasurer, and members of the governor's council. Democratic-Republican Cornelius P. Van Ness was the only candidate. The committee determined that Van Ness had easily won a third one-year term.

In the election for lieutenant governor, the committee determined that Democratic-Republican Aaron Leland was unopposed and had won election to a fourth one-year term.

Benjamin Swan was unopposed for election to a one-year term as treasurer, his twenty-sixth. Though he had nominally been a Federalist, Swan was usually endorsed by the Democratic-Republicans and even after the demise of the Federalist Party he was frequently unopposed. Contemporary newspaper accounts indicated that Van Ness, Leland, and Swan had won their races "nearly unanimously".

== Results ==
1825 Vermont gubernatorial election
| Party | Candidate | Votes | % |
|---|---|---|---|
| Democratic-Republican | Cornelius P. Van Ness (incumbent) | 12,229 | 98.43 |
| Write-in | | 195 | 1.57 |
| Total votes | | 12,424 | 100.0 |
