= 1828 Vermont gubernatorial election =

- September 2, 1828
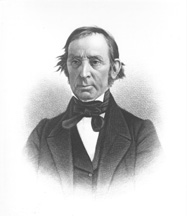

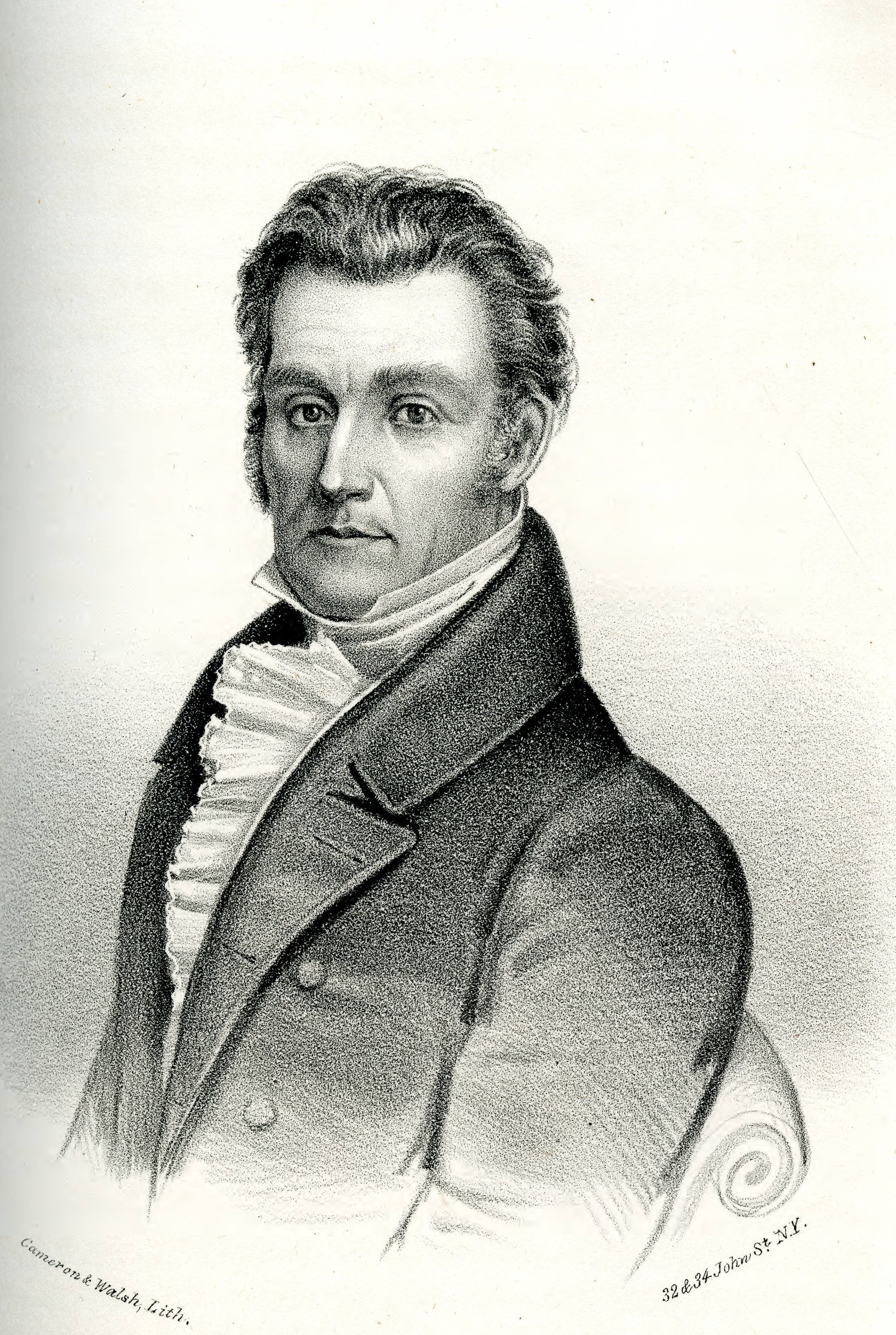
Nominee	Samuel C. Crafts	Joel Doolittle
Party	Adams	Jacksonian
Popular vote	16,285	916
Percentage	94.67%	5.33%
- County results Crafts: 60–70% 70–80% 80–90% 90–100%
Governor before election
Ezra Butler
Democratic-Republican
Elected Governor
Samuel C. Crafts
Adams

The 1828 Vermont gubernatorial election took place September 2, 1828. It resulted in the election of Samuel C. Crafts to a one-year term as governor.

The Vermont General Assembly met in Montpelier on October 9. The Vermont House of Representatives appointed a committee to review the votes of the freemen of Vermont for governor, lieutenant governor, treasurer, and members of the governor's council. The committee determined that Crafts had won election to a one-year term as governor.

In the election for lieutenant governor, the committee determined that Democratic-Republican Henry Olin had won election to a second one-year term. Contemporary newspaper articles reported the results as: Olin, 14,928 (95.8%); Lyman Fitch, 652 (4.2%).

Benjamin Swan won election to a one-year term as treasurer, his twenty-ninth. Though he had nominally been a Federalist, Swan was usually endorsed by the Democratic-Republicans and even after the demise of the Federalist Party he was frequently unopposed. Newspapers of the time did not report vote totals, but did indicate that Swan had been reelected with no opposition.

The vote totals in the governor's race were reported as follows:

== Results ==
1828 Vermont gubernatorial election
Party	Candidate	Votes	%	±%
Adams	Samuel C. Crafts	16,285	94.67	
Jacksonian	Joel Doolittle	916	5.33	
Total votes		17,201	100.0	
