= 1824 Vermont gubernatorial election =

- September 7, 1824
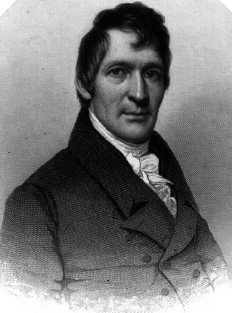

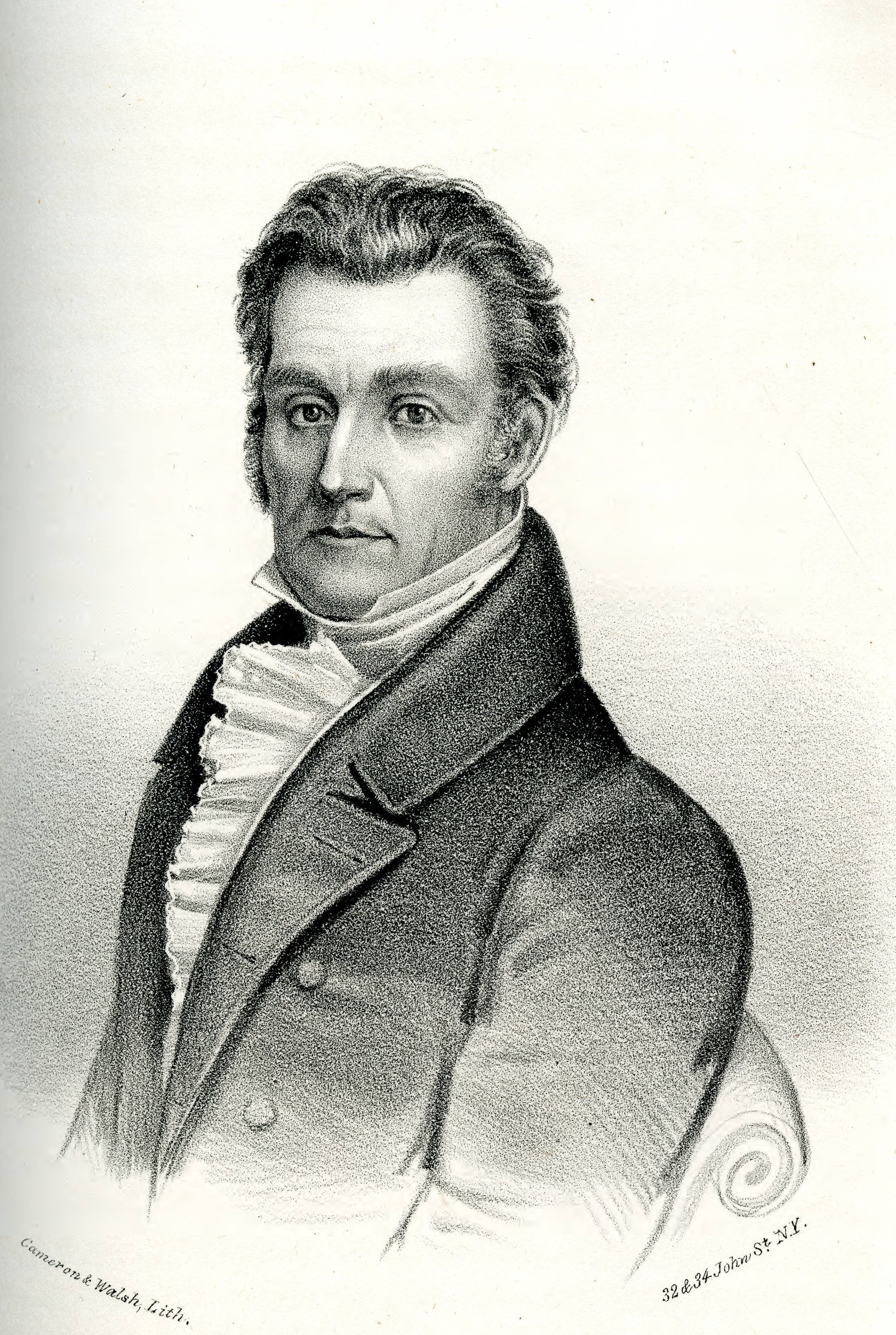
Nominee	Cornelius P. Van Ness	Joel Doolittle
Party	Democratic-Republican	Democratic-Republican
Popular vote	13,413	1,962
Percentage	85.32%	12.48%
- County results Van Ness: 50–60% 70–80% 80–90% 90–100%
Governor before election
Cornelius P. Van Ness
Democratic-Republican
Elected Governor
Cornelius P. Van Ness
Democratic-Republican

The 1824 Vermont gubernatorial election took place on September 7, 1824. It resulted in the election of Cornelius P. Van Ness to a one-year term as governor.

The Vermont General Assembly met in Montpelier on October 14. The Vermont House of Representatives appointed a committee to review the votes of the freemen of Vermont for governor, lieutenant governor, treasurer, and members of the governor's council. Democratic-Republican Cornelius P. Van Ness was the only major candidate. The committee determined that Van Ness had easily won a second one-year term against only token opposition.

In the election for lieutenant governor, the committee determined that Democratic-Republican Aaron Leland had won election to a third one-year term against only scattering opposition. A Vermont newspaper reported the results as: Leland, 14,166 (98.4%); scattering, 220 (1.6%).

Benjamin Swan was unopposed for election to a one-year term as treasurer, his twenty-fifth. Though he had nominally been a Federalist, Swan was usually endorsed by the Democratic-Republicans and even after the demise of the Federalists he was frequently unopposed. Vermont newspapers indicated that the results were: Swan, 12,743 (99.9%); scattering, 14 (0.1%).

In the race for governor, the results of the popular vote were reported as follows.

== Results ==
1824 Vermont gubernatorial election
Party	Candidate	Votes	%
Democratic-Republican	Cornelius P. Van Ness (incumbent)	13,413	85.32
Democratic-Republican	Joel Doolittle	1,962	12.48
Write-in		346	2.20
Total votes		15,721	100.0
