= 1823 Vermont gubernatorial election =

- September 2, 1823
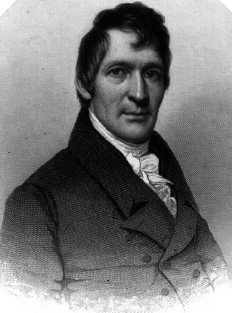
Nominee	Cornelius P. Van Ness	Dudley Chase
Party	Democratic-Republican	Democratic-Republican
Popular vote	11,479	1,088
Percentage	85.60%	8.11%
- County results Van Ness: 60–70% 80–90% 90–100% Chase: 50–60%
Governor before election
Richard Skinner
Democratic-Republican
Elected Governor
Cornelius P. Van Ness
Democratic-Republican

The 1823 Vermont gubernatorial election took place on September 2, 1823. It resulted in the election of Cornelius P. Van Ness to a one-year term as governor.

The Vermont General Assembly met in Montpelier on October 9. The Vermont House of Representatives appointed a committee to review the votes of the freemen of Vermont for governor, lieutenant governor, treasurer, and members of the governor's council. Democratic-Republican Cornelius P. Van Ness was the only major candidate. The committee determined that Van Ness had easily won a one-year term against only token opposition.

In the election for lieutenant governor, the committee determined that Democratic-Republican Aaron Leland had won election to a second one-year term against only scattering opposition. A Vermont newspaper reported the results as: Leland, 11,758 (98.5%); scattering, 176 (1.5%).

Benjamin Swan was unopposed for election to a one-year term as treasurer, his twenty-fourth. Though nominally a Federalist, Swan was usually endorsed by the Democratic-Republicans and even after the demise of the Federalists Swan often ran unopposed. Vermont newspapers indicated that the results were: Swan, 10,141 (99.8%); scattering, 17 (0.2%).

In the race for governor, the results of the popular vote were reported as follows.

== Results ==
1823 Vermont gubernatorial election
Party	Candidate	Votes	%
Democratic-Republican	Cornelius P. Van Ness	11,479	85.60
Democratic-Republican	Dudley Chase	1,088	8.11
Write-in		843	6.29
Total votes		13,410	100.0
