= Van Ness Mansion =

Former 1816-built mansion in Washington, District of Columbia

Coordinates: 38.893°N 77.040°W

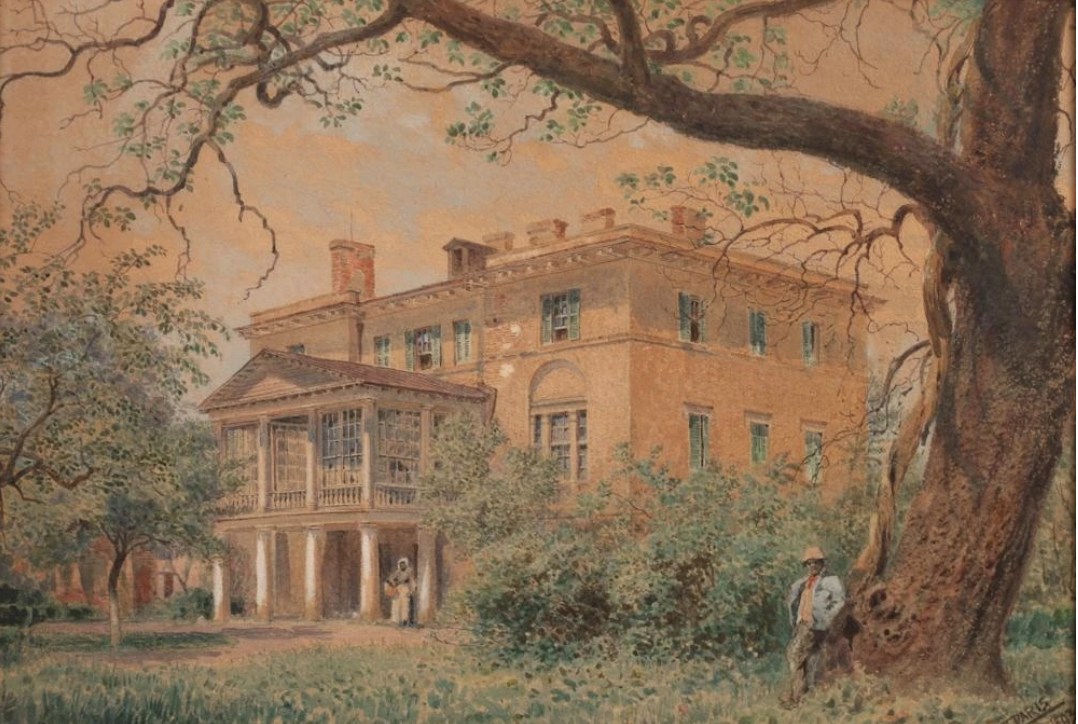
Van Ness Mansion, 1893, watercolor, Walter Paris

The Van Ness Mansion was completed for John Peter Van Ness and Marcia Van Ness in 1816 by Benjamin Henry Latrobe on 17th Street Northwest, Washington, D.C. They entertained the Madisons, James Monroe, George Washington Parke Custis and John Tayloe III at their mansion. The mansion was described as the "finest house in America". It was built on land that had been owned by Marcia's father, David Burnes, who left 500 acres along the Potomac River to Van Ness. It was one of the most expensive houses in the country, fitted with hot and cold running water, a modern feature at the time, and the mansion was the first residence in the city to have that luxury. Latrobe added a feature designed to maintain a sense of privacy when food was conveyed to dining rooms. Servants accessed rotating servers from a hallway that allowed them to deliver food without entering the room. He installed them previously at the Adena Mansion in Chillicothe, Ohio. It had the country's largest and coolest wine vault. Latrobe said that the Van Ness Mansion was "the best house I ever designed". It overlaid his "American rational-configuration on the kind of English residential model that impressed him during his work for and study with S.P. Cockerell."

Latrobe also worked with John Peter Van Ness on the reconstruction of Washington, D.C. public buildings. Van Ness was a commissioner of the Capitol reconstruction commission, along with Richard B. Lee and Tench Ringgold.

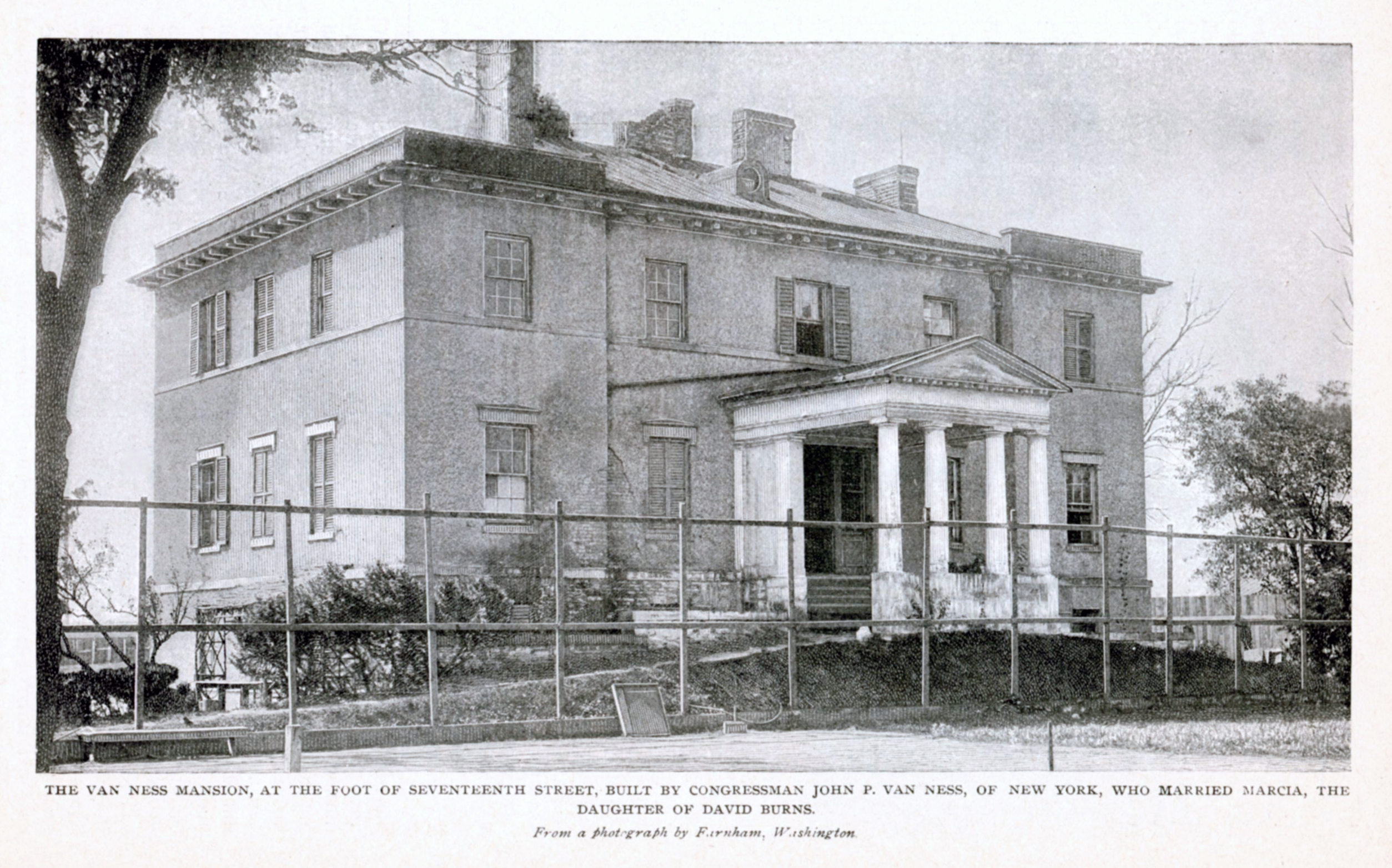
The Van Ness Mansion, at the foot of 17th Street, Washington, D.C.

The mansion degraded over time. In 1907, the mansion was razed and the Pan American Union Building was built on the site. The stables, also designed by Latrobe, were not demolished at that time. The stuccoed building still exists at 18th and C Streets Northwest.

== Sources ==
- Hamlin, Talbot (1955). Benjamin Henry Latrobe. New York: Oxford University Press. LCCN 55-8117. OCLC 554973.
