= 1827 Vermont gubernatorial election =

- September 4, 1827
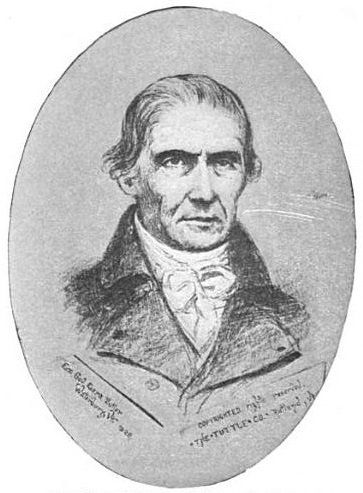

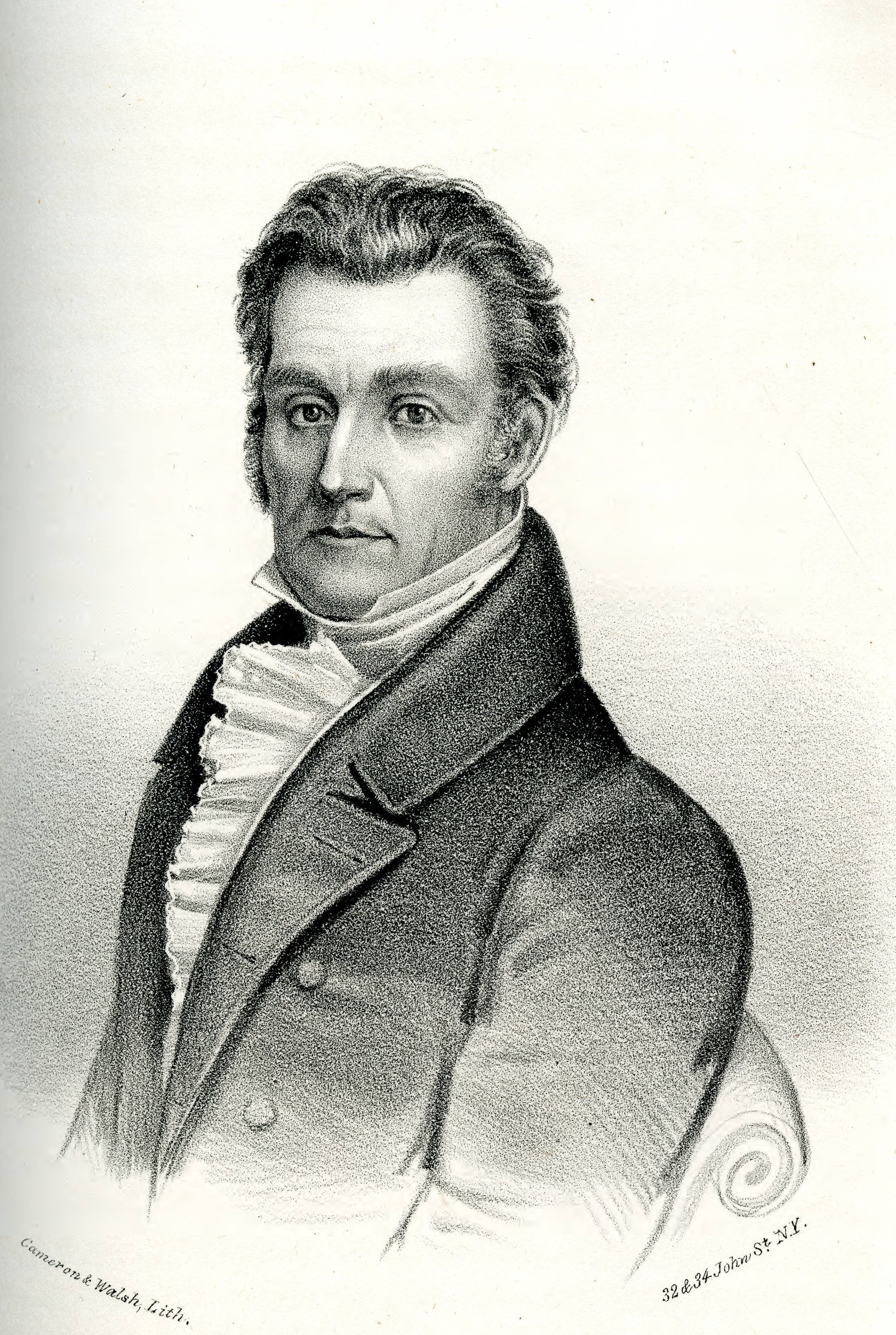
Nominee	Ezra Butler	Joel Doolittle
Party	Democratic-Republican	Democratic-Republican
Popular vote	13,699	1,951
Percentage	87.53%	12.47%
- County results Butler: 50–60% 60–70% 70–80% 80–90% 90–100%
Governor before election
Ezra Butler
Democratic-Republican
Elected Governor
Ezra Butler
Democratic-Republican

The 1827 Vermont gubernatorial election took place on September 4, 1827. It resulted in the election of Ezra Butler to a one-year term as governor.

The Vermont General Assembly met in Montpelier on October 11. The Vermont House of Representatives appointed a committee to review the votes of the freemen of Vermont for governor, lieutenant governor, treasurer, and members of the governor's council. The committee determined that Ezra Butler had won election to a second one-year term.

In the election for lieutenant governor, the committee determined that Democratic-Republican Henry Olin had won election to a one-year term. Newspapers of the time reported the vote totals as: Olin, 9,411 (67.5%); Samuel C. Crafts, 2,667 (19.1%); Israel P. Dana, 1,865 (13.4%).

Benjamin Swan won election to a one-year term as treasurer, his twenty-eighth. Though he had nominally been a Federalist, Swan was usually endorsed by the Democratic-Republicans and even after the demise of the Federalist Party he was frequently unopposed. According to a contemporary news account, Swan was chosen nearly unanimously, with no major opposition and only 17 votes scattering.

The vote totals in the governor's race were reported as follows:

== Results ==
1827 Vermont gubernatorial election
Party	Candidate	Votes	%	±%
Democratic-Republican	Ezra Butler (incumbent)	13,699	87.53	
Democratic-Republican	Joel Doolittle	1,951	12.47	
Total votes		15,650	100.0	
