= Asa Aikens =

American judge (1788–1863)

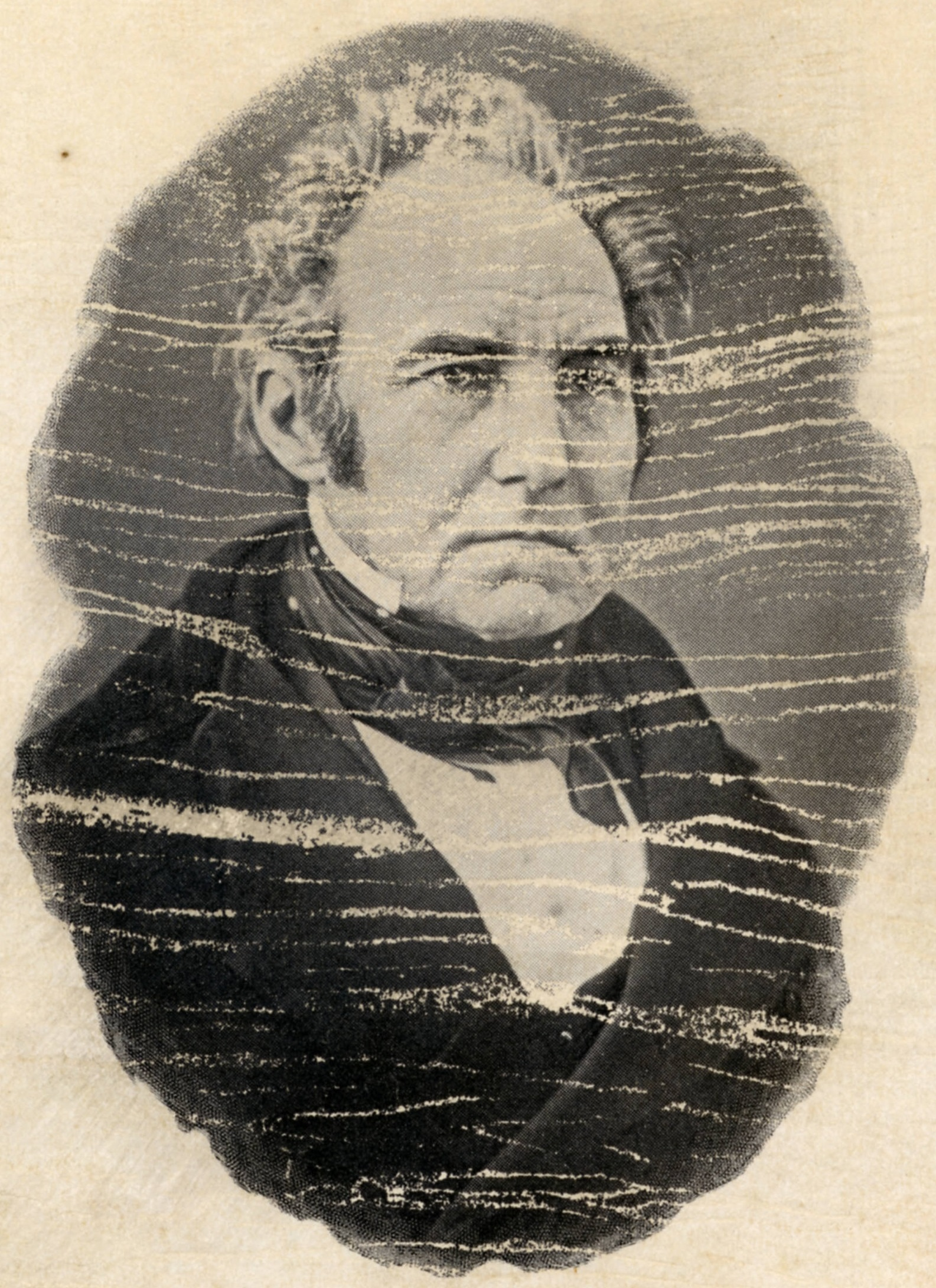
Asa Aikens, Vermont Supreme Court Justice

Asa Aikens (January 13, 1788 – July 12, 1863) was an attorney, politician, and judge in Vermont and New York. A veteran of the War of 1812, Aikens served as a justice of the Vermont Supreme Court from 1823 to 1824.

== Biography ==
Asa Aikens (sometimes spelled "Aiken"), was born in Barnard, Vermont on January 13, 1788, the son of Solomon and Betsey (Smith) Aikens. He was educated in Windsor County, and attended Middlebury College from 1804 to 1807. After attending the United States Military Academy for a year, Aikens returned to Middlebury and graduated in 1808. He then studied law with Joel Doolittle, attained admission to the bar, and commenced practice in Windsor, Vermont. During the War of 1812, Aikens was commissioned as a captain and served with the 31st Infantry Regiment.

After the war, Aikens resumed practicing law in Windsor. In 1818 and 1821 he served as Windsor's member of the Vermont House of Representatives. From 1818 to 1820 he served as State's Attorney for Windsor County. Aikens served as a justice of the Vermont Supreme Court from 1823 to 1825. In 1827 he was president of the state Council of Censors, the body which met every seven years to review the actions of the governor and legislature and ensure their constitutionality. In 1836, he was a delegate to the state constitutional convention.

In 1843, Aikens relocated to Westport, New York, where he continued to practice law. Aikens was also active in local politics and government, and terms served as both town supervisor of Westport and a town justice.

== Career as author ==
In 1836, Aikens published Practical Forms, a reference work used by attorneys in the preparation of legal documents. In 1846, he authored Tables of Interest and Discount, a reference work which enabled users to calculate interest, depreciation, and amortization on annuities, mortgages, pensions, rents, and estates.

== Death and burial ==
Aikens died in Hackensack, New Jersey on July 12, 1863, while there to visit his son-in law Frederick Jacobson. He was buried at Trinity Church Cemetery in New York City.

== Family ==
In 1809, Aikens married Nancy Ann Spencer; they were the parents of Emma Jeromine and Julienne Gertrude. With his second wife, Sarah Hunter (m. 1814), he was the father of: Villeroy Spencer; Mary Elizabeth; Helen St. Johns; Augusta; William Hunter; Edwin Edgerton; Charles Eugene; Sarah Hunter; Guy Hunter; and Franklin Hunter.

Aikens' daughter Sarah was the wife of Frederick Jacobson, with whom Aikens was visiting when he died.

== Sources ==
- Aldrich, Lewis Cass (1891). History of Windsor County, Vermont. Syracuse, NY: D. Mason & Co. p. 100.
- Deming, Leonard (1851). Catalogue of the Principal Officers of Vermont. Middlebury, VT: L. Deming.
- Royce, Caroline Halstead (1904). Bessboro: a History of Westport, Essex Co., N.Y. Elizabethtown, NY: C. H. Royce. p. 439.
- Ullery, Jacob G. (1894). Men of Vermont Illustrated. Brattleboro, VT: Transcript Publishing Company. p. 180.
- Wiley, Edgar J. (1917). Catalogue of Officers and Students of Middlebury College. Middlebury, VT: Middlebury College.

Legal offices
Preceded by Joel Doolittle	Associate Justice of the Vermont Supreme Court; 1823-1825	Succeeded by Stephen Royce
Preceded by Horace Everett	State's Attorney of Windsor County, Vermont; 1818-1820	Succeeded by Jacob Collamer
