= Samuel Betts =

American judge (1786–1868)

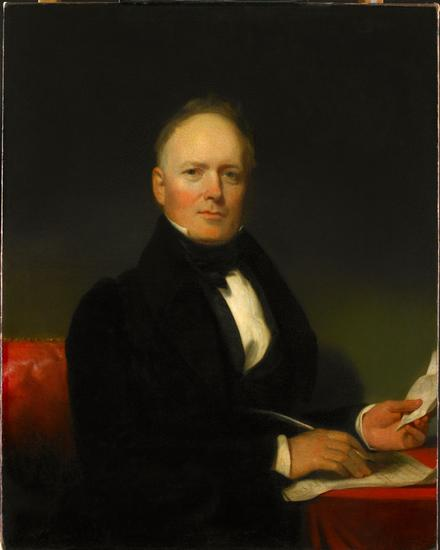

Judge of the United States District Court for the Southern District of New York
- In office December 21, 1826 – April 30, 1867
- Appointed by: John Quincy Adams
- Preceded by: William P. Van Ness
- Succeeded by: Samuel Blatchford

Member of the U.S. House of Representatives from New York's 7th district
- In office March 4, 1815 – March 3, 1817
- Preceded by: Abraham J. Hasbrouck
- Succeeded by: Josiah Hasbrouck

Judge of the Circuit Court for New York's 2nd District
- In office May 1, 1823 – December 21, 1826
- Preceded by: Position created
- Succeeded by: James Emott

District Attorney of Orange County, New York
- In office February 5, 1818 – June 6, 1820
- Preceded by: Position created
- Succeeded by: Henry G. Wisner
- In office February 15, 1821 – May 9, 1823
- Preceded by: Henry G. Wisner
- Succeeded by: Ogden Hoffman

Personal details
- Born: June 8, 1786 Richmond, Massachusetts
- Died: November 3, 1868 (aged 82) New Haven, Connecticut
- Resting place: Woodlawn Cemetery; New York City, New York
- Party: Democratic-Republican
- Spouse: Caroline Abigail Dewey
- Relations: Daniel Dewey (father in law)
- Children: 5
- Education: Williams College
- Profession: Attorney

Samuel Rossiter Betts (June 8, 1786 – November 3, 1868) was an American attorney, politician, and jurist who served as a United States representative from New York and a United States district judge of the United States District Court for the Southern District of New York.

== Early life and education ==
Born on June 8, 1786, in Richmond, Berkshire County, Massachusetts, Betts graduated from Lenox Academy in 1803, and was the first from that institution to attended college. He graduated from Williams College in1806 and studied law with Thomas P. Grosvenor in Hudson, New York.

== Career ==
Betts was admitted to the bar in 1809 and entered private practice in Monticello, where he practiced until 1812. He served in the United States Army from 1812 to 1814 appointed as a judge advocate of volunteers during the War of 1812. He was a division judge advocate, General Court Martial, for the New York State Detached Militia starting in 1814.

=== U.S. House of Representatives ===
Betts was elected as a Democratic-Republican from New York's 7th congressional district to the United States House of Representatives of the 14th United States Congress, serving from March 4, 1815, to March 3, 1817. He was not a candidate for renomination in 1816.

=== Later career ===
Following his departure from Congress, Betts resumed private practice in Newburgh, New York, from 1817 to 1823. He was district attorney for Orange County, New York from 1818 to 1820 and again from 1821 to 1823. He was a judge of the Supreme Court of Judicature of New York (now the New York Supreme Court) from 1823 to 1826.

=== Federal judicial service ===
Betts was nominated by President John Quincy Adams on December 19, 1826, to a seat on the United States District Court for the Southern District of New York vacated by Judge William P. Van Ness. He was confirmed by the United States Senate on December 21, 1826, and received his commission the same day. His service terminated on April 30, 1867, due to his resignation.

Together with Supreme Court Justice Joseph Story and Judge Peleg Sprague on the United States District Court for the District of Massachusetts, Betts oversaw, untangled and interpreted the British legacy of admiralty and maritime law in adherence to the American Constitution. He decided numerous prize court cases during the American Civil War.

Betts was the sitting judge for the piracy trial of Charles Gibbs in 1831.

== Personal life ==
Betts married Caroline Abigail Dewey (1798–1882), daughter of Daniel Dewey (1766–1815) and Maria Noble (1770–1813). They had five children.

According to the 1820 U.S. Census, Betts was the owner of two slaves, a female under 14, and a female between 26 and 44. In keeping with New York's gradual emancipation law, under which all slaves were freed by 1827, by the time of the 1830 census, Betts held no slaves.

Betts died on November 3, 1868, in New Haven, Connecticut. He was interred in Woodlawn Cemetery in The Bronx, New York City, New York.

== See also ==
- List of United States federal judges by longevity of service

U.S. House of Representatives
Preceded by Abraham J. Hasbrouck	Member of the U.S. House of Representatives from New York's 7th congressional district 1815–1817	Succeeded by Josiah Hasbrouck
Legal offices
Preceded by William P. Van Ness	Judge of the United States District Court for the Southern District of New York; 1826–1867	Succeeded by Samuel Blatchford
