= David Burnes =

David Burnes, his surname is also spelled Burns (1739–1799), (Note: A newspaper article about their graves says in one place that Burnes died in 1800 (and could not have been around for a visit with Thomas Moore in 1804). The typed representation of the gravestone states that he died May 8, 1807, the year that his wife died. According to Clark, the dates on the gravestones are incorrect. Burnes died May 7, 1799. His son John, was still living on October 19, 1793. His daughter, Marcia, who married in 1802, was said to have married after her father's death.) made a fortune selling his land to help create the City of Washington. The White House, South Lawn, The Ellipse, and part of the National Mall sit on land that Burnes once owned.

He fought in General Edward Braddock's army during the French and Indian War (1754–1763) and in the Revolutionary War. Farming was his primary occupation, he was also a magistrate, justice of peace, and overseer of highways. His daughter Marcia (Burnes) Van Ness, the wife of a John Peter Van Ness, inherited his estate.

== Early life ==
Territorial progression of Washington, D.C. from 1790 to 1871

David Burnes was born about February 12, 1739. Burnes was the son of James Burnes and the grandson of David Burnes, an immigrant. His younger siblings were Thomas, John, James, Ann, wife of Alexander Truman, Margaret, Elizabeth, Frederick, William, and Burgess.

Before he died in 1769, his father James started the process to get a patent for part of Beall's Level. Burnes got the patent for the land in 1774. Burnes inherited land that his grandfather, David Burnes, an immigrant, had owned and that his father James had acquired or inherited. Burnes, the oldest son, inherited his father's estate.

General Edward Braddock crossed at Georgetown. Burnes, who was sixteen, and his brother James joined Braddock's company led by Captain John Perry. Serving with him were Captain John Wightt, Burnes brother-in-law, and his brother James. David and James were both second lieutenants. In 1778, Burnes joined the First Maryland Brigades of the Continental Army during the Revolutionary War (1775–1783). He was a second lieutenant.

Burnes trained as a lawyer, and became a justice of the peace and magistrate in Prince George's County, Maryland, in the part of the county that became part of the District of Columbia. He also served as an overseer of highways. He spent much of his life farming his land, with the labor of "numerous" enslaved people. He owned twelve enslaved people in 1790. His skills as a businessman helped him make a fortune from the development of his land. Burnes lived in a plank house with a stone chimney and had a tobacco house at what is now 17th and D Street NW. By 1790, he owned 450 or 600 acres of land that had been overfarmed.

== Marriage and children ==
Burnes married Ann Wightt, who was born about February 24, 1740. Ann was born within the City of Washington's ten square miles. Her brother owned the farm called "Inclosure" on the land patent. Burnes and his wife had different religious leanings. Ann for the Church of England and Burnes for Scotch Presbyterian. Ann attended the Episcopal Church in Georgetown in her later years. The community held her in high esteem and she possessed "charitable and benevolent virtues".

The Burnes had two children. John died after October 19, 1793. Marcia, born in 1782, received her elementary education in Georgetown. Both John and Marcia lived with Luther Martin's family in Baltimore when Maria acquired further education and John studied` law at Martin's office. James Peale met her in Baltimore and painted her portrait in 1797. Marcia attended balls at Georgetown and began to be called an heiress in 1798.

== District of Columbia ==
In the late 18th century, most of what is now Washington, D.C. was undeveloped land, except for Alexandria and Georgetown. Burnes and 14 other landowners negotiated with George Washington to sell their land to the government for the creation of the ten-square-mile City of Washington.

Burnes negotiated the terms of the sale with the commissioners and George Washington. The former president called him "Obstinate Mr. Burnes", which author Allen C. Clark states was Washington's way of jesting with Burnes about his strong negotiation skills. George Alfred Townsend stated "'The obstinate Mr. Burns' will be the subject of portraiture often in the future, stickling for the largest equity and conditions, and paying little relative respect to the opinion of the General, whom he once declared to be of eminence chiefly on the score of having married the rich widow Cust (Custis)".

To come to an agreement, Washington threatened Burnes that the government could take his land (Takings clause of the 5th Amendment). Burnes agreed to the sale in 1791. One of the terms was that no streets would be constructed through his house. The protected property became the oldest residence in the city. The deed of David Burnes conveying the land to the commissioners in trust was the first deed recorded in the City of Washington.

The lands of Burnes, Daniel Carroll, of Duddington Manor, Motley Young, and Samuel Davidson were the basis of the 7,100-acre city. As part of the agreement, Burnes and the rest of the men retained every other lot and they gave the other half to the government. A city plat was developed for streets and lots, and the owners would not be paid until their lots were sold. In the meantime, public streets were constructed, including Pennsylvania Avenue that ran through Burnes' farm. Obstructions slowed the development of the city, with little progress made by 1799. Burnes corresponded and posted comments in newspapers about his concerns for years. In 1800, the United States Congress, specifically the 6th Congress, held its first session in Washington, D.C. The city was not equipped to provide adequate lodging and dining facilities. The White House and the Congressional buildings were still under construction. Burnes suffered financially due to the delays in selling and being paid for his land.

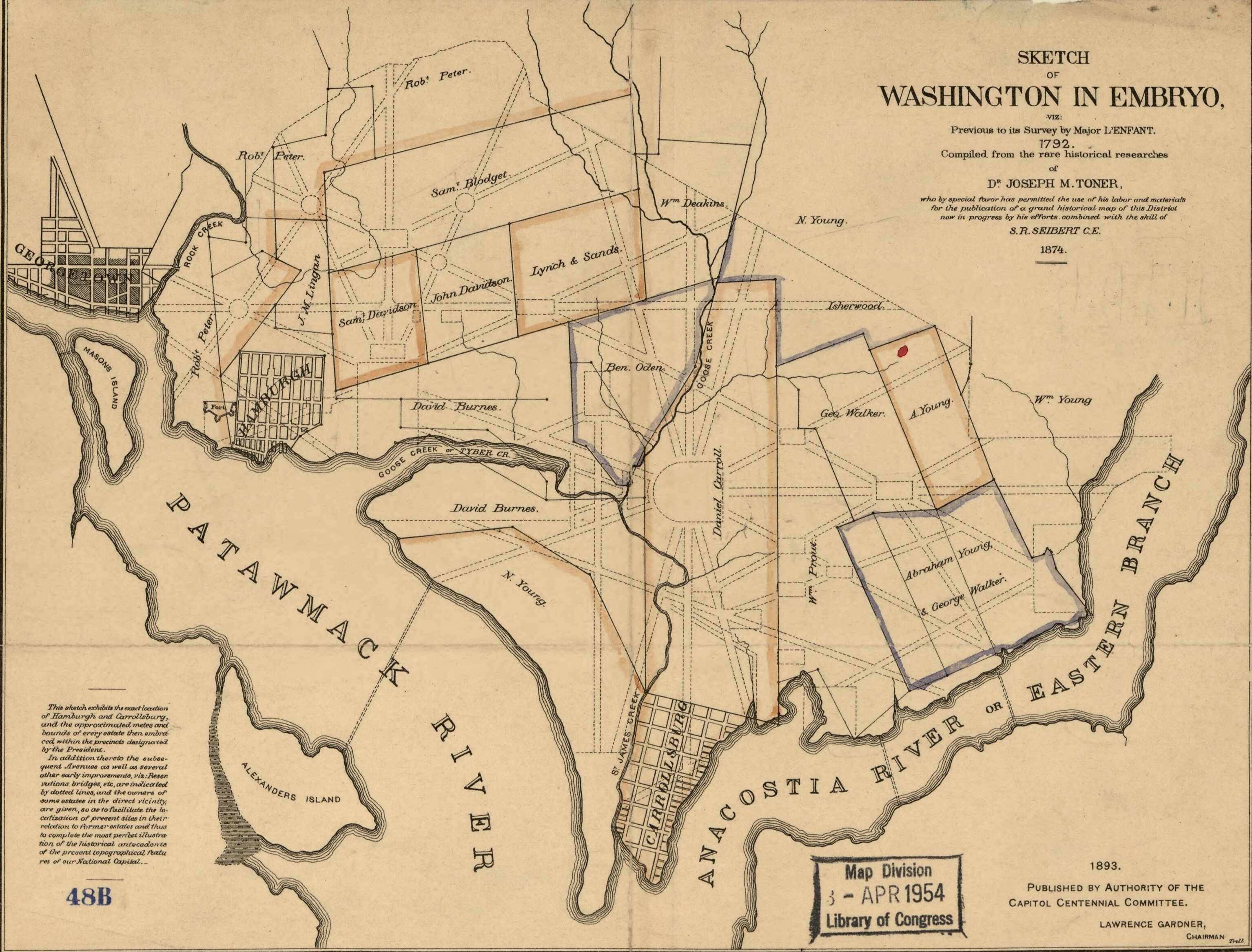
Sketch of Washington in embryo, 1792. David Burnes' land was on either side of Goose Creek towards the center of the map. Pennsylvania Avenue, which runs through Burnes' land, is represented in dotted lines.

His land extended from Third and 18th Street and from Constitution Avenue to H Street. Within that area are the White House and its south side, including The Ellipse and the South Lawn. Some of the National Mall also sits on Burnes' former land.

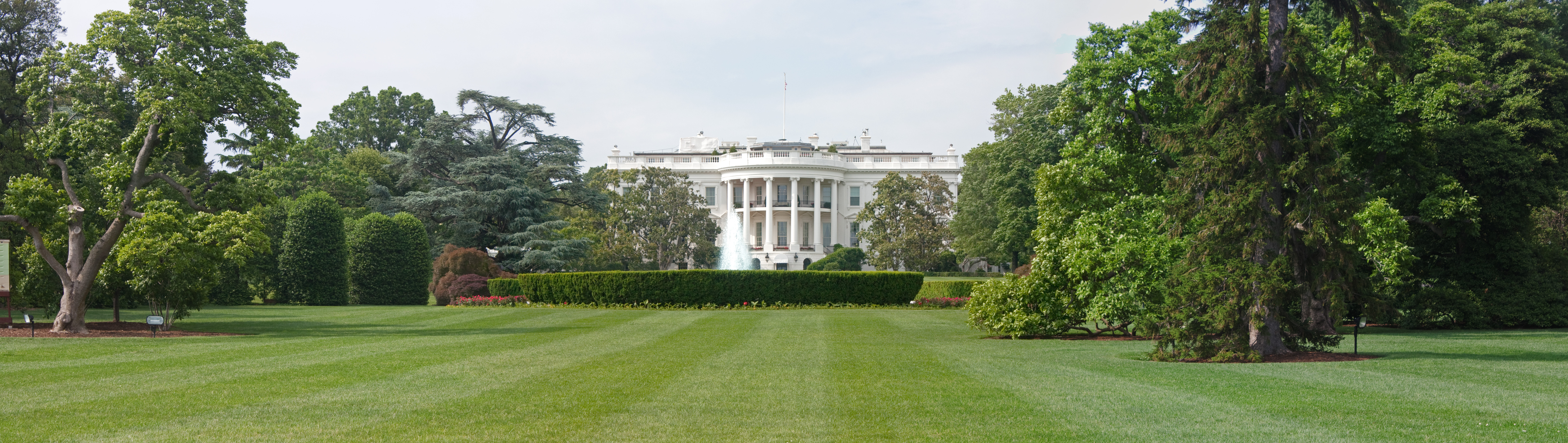
White House and South Lawn

== Later years and death ==
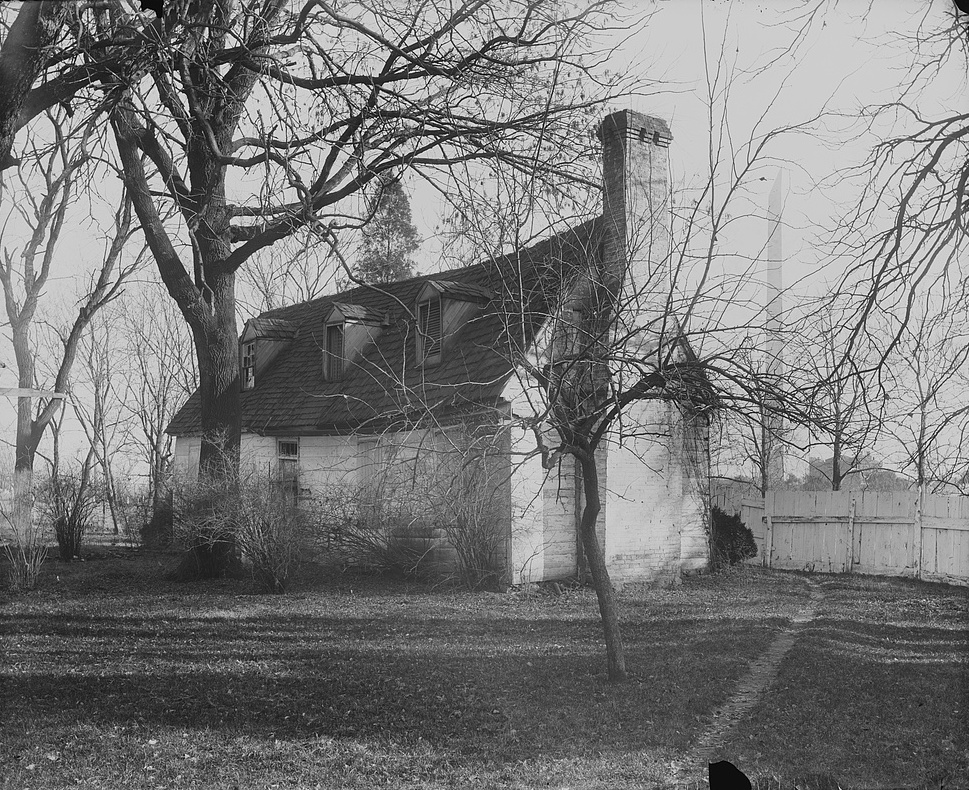
Home of David Burnes (Burns) and his daughter, Marcia (Burns) Van Ness, with the Washington Monument in the background, Washington, D.C., by Frances Benjamin Johnston, ca. 1889. Burn's cottage was demolished in 1894

Burnes built a 1 1/2-story house in downtown Washington with beautiful views of the city. He grew crops on his remaining land. Over time, the payments for his land were settled with the federal government. He also sold the lots that were not ear-marked for the federal government, both of which made him wealthy.

Leading men of Washington visited him at his home called "Burnes Mansion", which was a simple but well-appointed residence for the time. George Washington, Thomas Jefferson, Lee, Alexander Hamilton, the Carrolls, the Duddingtons, and Aaron Burr were some of his visitors. Many men came to the Burnes household get to know Burnes' daughter Marcia.

Burnes died in the City of Washington on May 7, 1799, at the age of 60, with his death notice published in the Centinel of Liberty and Georgetown and Washington Advertiser on May 10, 1799.

His wife managed his estate and stopped managing the farm about December 1800 when she sold twelve enslaved people. Marcia married Congressman John Peter Van Ness on May 9, 1802, after her father died. Ann and Marcia rented a house at 1109 and 1111 Pennsylvania Avenue. The lived there with Marcia's husband, John Peter Van Ness, until December 1804 when they moved to a house at 1202 D. Pennsylvania Avenue. The family hosted events for the leading people of the city.

Marcia's mother, Ann (Anne) Burnes, died on January 28, 1807, and was said to have been buried at a family gravesite five miles from their house. Burnes, his wife, and his son were buried in remote, unusual burial sites. They were reinterred at the Rock Creek Cemetery in Washington, D.C. in 1888, by Eugene Van Ness. John Peter Van Ness inherited a sizeable estate from his father. Marcia inherited an estate valued at $14 million in 2000. She and her husband built the Van Ness Mansion behind her father's house. The mansion was located on what is now the site of the Pan American Union Building.

== See also ==
- Reportedly haunted locations in Washington, D.C. § Non-residents

== Bibliography ==
- Lockwood, Mary S. (1889). Historic Homes in Washington: Its noted men and women. New York: Belford Company, Publishers.
- Clark, Allen C. (1919). "General John Peter Van Ness, a Mayor of the City of Washington, His Wife, Marcia, and Her Father, David Burnes". Records of the Columbia Historical Society, Washington, D.C. 22: 125–204. ISSN 0897-9049. JSTOR 40067123.
