= William P. Van Ness =

American judge (1778–1826)

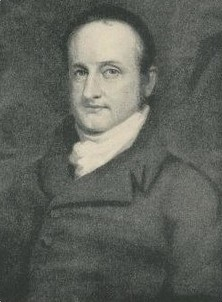

Judge of the United States District Court for the Southern District of New York
- In office April 9, 1814 – September 6, 1826
- Appointed by: operation of law
- Preceded by: Seat established by 3 Stat. 120
- Succeeded by: Samuel Betts

Judge of the United States District Court for the District of New York
- In office May 27, 1812 – April 9, 1814
- Appointed by: James Madison
- Preceded by: Seat established by 2 Stat. 719
- Succeeded by: Seat abolished

Personal details
- Born: William Peter Van Ness; February 13, 1778 Claverack, New York
- Died: September 6, 1826 (aged 48) New York City, New York
- Resting place: Green-Wood Cemetery; Brooklyn, New York
- Party: Democratic-Republican
- Spouse: Anne McEvers (m. 1800–1826)
- Children: 5
- Relatives: John Peter Van Ness (brother); Cornelius P. Van Ness (brother); James Van Ness (nephew)
- Education: Columbia University
- Occupation: Attorney

William Peter Van Ness (February 13, 1778 – September 6, 1826) was a United States district judge of the United States District Court for the District of New York and the United States District Court for the Southern District of New York, also notable for serving as Aaron Burr's second in Burr's duel with Alexander Hamilton.

== Education and career ==
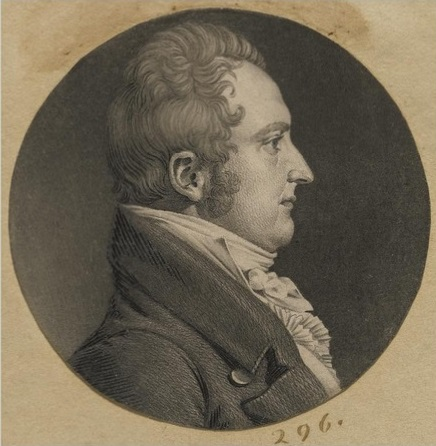
William Peter Van Ness, 1807 engraving by Charles Saint-Mémin

Van Ness was born on February 13, 1778, in a portion of Claverack, New York that later became part of the town of Ghent Van Ness attended Washington Seminary graduated from Columbia College (now part of Columbia University) in 1797 and read law with Edward Livingston in 1800. He practiced in New York City from 1800 to 1801. In 1801, Van Ness served as a delegate to the New York Constitutional Convention, which was called to amend the state constitution of 1777. He continued private practice in Albany, New York starting in 1801 and in Hudson, New York, before resuming private practice in New York City until 1812.

=== Notable legal apprentice ===
Martin Van Buren completed his legal studies in Van Ness's office in 1802 and became an attorney in Columbia County, New York.

== Relationship with Aaron Burr and participation in duel ==
Van Ness, a close friend of Aaron Burr, was an active participant in the 1800 presidential campaign as a vocal supporter of the Democratic-Republican Party candidates Burr for Vice President and Thomas Jefferson for President. Burr and Jefferson tied in the electoral college, and the election moved to the United States House of Representatives, where Federalists wanted to defeat their great enemy, Jefferson, by electing Burr as President. Van Ness secretly supported the Federalist plan, but it failed, and Jefferson won the presidency, with Burr chosen for the vice presidency.

In July 1804, Van Ness served as Aaron Burr's second in Burr's duel with Alexander Hamilton. He and Hamilton's second, Nathaniel Pendleton loaded the pistols, and were present when Burr fatally shot Hamilton.

== Federal judicial service ==
Van Ness was nominated by President James Madison on May 25, 1812, to the United States District Court for the District of New York, to a new seat authorized by 2 Stat. 719. He was confirmed by the United States Senate on May 26, 1812, and received his commission on May 27, 1812. Van Ness was reassigned by operation of law to the United States District Court for the Southern District of New York on April 9, 1814, to a new seat authorized by 3 Stat. 120. His service terminated on September 6, 1826, due to his death in New York City. He was interred in Brooklyn's Green-Wood Cemetery.

=== Embezzlement investigation ===
In 1818, the clerk of Van Ness' court, Theron Rudd, who had also worked for Judge Matthias B. Tallmadge was accused of embezzling more than $100,000 (about $1.6 million in 2019) intended to pay court judgments. Upon being discovered, Rudd fled with the money. He later returned to the United States and was prosecuted. He was sentenced to 10 years of hard labor, and the US government obtained a judgment against him, but he never paid it and the money was never recovered.

The investigation into Rudd's theft also considered the issue of Tallmadge's and Van Ness' culpability. Investigators later determined that while they might have been guilty of lax supervision, particularly Van Ness, since Tallmadge had been absent from court because of his extended illness, they were not involved in the theft and were not responsible for Rudd's actions.

=== Investigation into performance ===
Also in 1818, Congress appointed a special committee to look into the official conduct of Van Ness and his judicial colleague, Matthias B. Tallmadge, who apparently did not work well together. The friction between them was largely responsible for the split of New York's district court into southern and northern districts in 1814. Tallmadge was assigned to the northern district, but his frequent ill health often required Van Ness to preside over both courts.

The investigation considered whether Van Ness and Tallmadge were failing to capably perform their duties. The committee determined in February 1819 that Tallmadge had not always held court for the northern district on the dates required by law, but that this was not an impeachable offense. The committee took no further action, and Tallmadge's continued illness caused him to resign in July 1819.

== Family and estate ==
Van Ness was born to Judge Peter Van Ness (1734–1804), a wealthy lawyer and farmer who owned the property in Kinderhook, New York, on which Van Ness constructed a mansion in 1797. Martin Van Buren later purchased the home and land and renamed the estate Lindenwald. Peter Van Ness is buried on the Lindenwald estate. Van Ness's brothers included United States Representative and Washington, D.C. Mayor John Peter Van Ness and Governor of Vermont Cornelius P. Van Ness. In 1800, Van Ness married Anne McEvers (1767–1829) in Red Hook. They were members of the Dutch Reformed Church, and the parents of five children.

== Author ==
Van Ness was the author of several political and judicial works, including: Examination of Charges against Aaron Burr (1803); The Laws of New York, with Notes, (with John Woodworth), (2 vols. 1813); Reports of Two Cases in the Prize Court for New York District (1814); and Concise Narrative of Gen. Jackson's First Invasion of Florida (1826).

== In popular culture ==
Van Ness' role in the Burr–Hamilton duel is referenced in the musical Hamilton as part of the song "The World Was Wide Enough".

== Sources ==
- "Van Ness, William Peter - Federal Judicial Center". www.fjc.gov.

Legal offices
Preceded by Seat established by 2 Stat. 719	Judge of the United States District Court for the District of New York; 1812–1814	Succeeded by Seat abolished
Preceded by Seat established by 3 Stat. 120	Judge of the United States District Court for the Southern District of New York; 1814–1826	Succeeded by Samuel Betts
