= William Cahoon =

American politician

Member of the United States House of Representatives from Vermont's 4th district
- In office March 4, 1829 – March 3, 1833
- Preceded by: Daniel Azro Ashley Buck
- Succeeded by: Benjamin F. Deming

6th Lieutenant Governor of Vermont
- In office 1820–1822
- Governor: Richard Skinner
- Preceded by: Paul Brigham
- Succeeded by: Aaron Leland

Personal details
- Born: January 12, 1774 Providence, Rhode Island Colony, British America
- Died: May 30, 1833 (aged 59) Lyndon, Vermont, U.S.
- Resting place: Lyndon Town Cemetery in Lyndon Center
- Party: Democratic-Republican Party; Anti-Masonic Party
- Children: George C. Cahoon and Edward A. Cahoon
- Profession: Politician, Judge

William Cahoon (January 12, 1774 – May 30, 1833) was an American judge and politician. He served as a U.S. representative from Vermont for two terms from 1829 to 1833.

== Biography ==
Cahoon was born in Providence in the Colony of Rhode Island and Providence Plantations to Daniel Cahoon Jr (1737-1811) and Lillis (Dyer) Cahoon (1740-1832). He attended the common schools. He moved with his parents to Lyndon, Vermont, in 1791 and engaged in milling and agricultural pursuits.

=== Political career ===
He was a member of the Vermont State House of Representatives from 1802 until 1810. He succeeded his father as town clerk in Lyndon, and served from 1808 until 1829.

Cahoon was a presidential elector in 1808 and voted for Madison and Langdon. He was appointed major general in the militia in 1808 and served during the War of 1812. From 1811 until 1819, Cahoon served as Caledonia County judge. He was a delegate to the Vermont State constitutional conventions in 1814 and 1828, and a member of the Vermont Governor's Council from 1815 until 1820.

From 1820 until 1821, Cahoon served as the Lieutenant Governor of Vermont.

=== Congress ===
He was elected an Anti-Masonic candidate to the Twenty-first United States Congress and the Twenty-second United States Congress, serving from March 4, 1829, until March 3, 1833.

He was an unsuccessful candidate in 1832 for reelection to Congress.

== Personal life ==
Cahoon had two sons, George C. Cahoon and Edward A. Cahoon. Edward was a Vermont State Senator.

== Death ==
Cahoon died on May 30, 1833, in Lyndon, Vermont. He is interred at the Lyndon Town Cemetery in Lyndon Center.

Party political offices
Preceded by Paul Brigham	Democratic-Republican nominee for Lieutenant Governor of Vermont; 1820, 1821	Succeeded by Aaron Leland
Political offices
Preceded by Paul Brigham	Lieutenant Governor of Vermont; 1820–1822	Succeeded by Aaron Leland
U.S. House of Representatives
Preceded by Daniel A. A. Buck	Member of the U.S. House of Representatives from Vermont's 6th congressional district 1829–1833	Succeeded by Benjamin F. Deming
