= Joel Doolittle =

American judge (1773–1841)

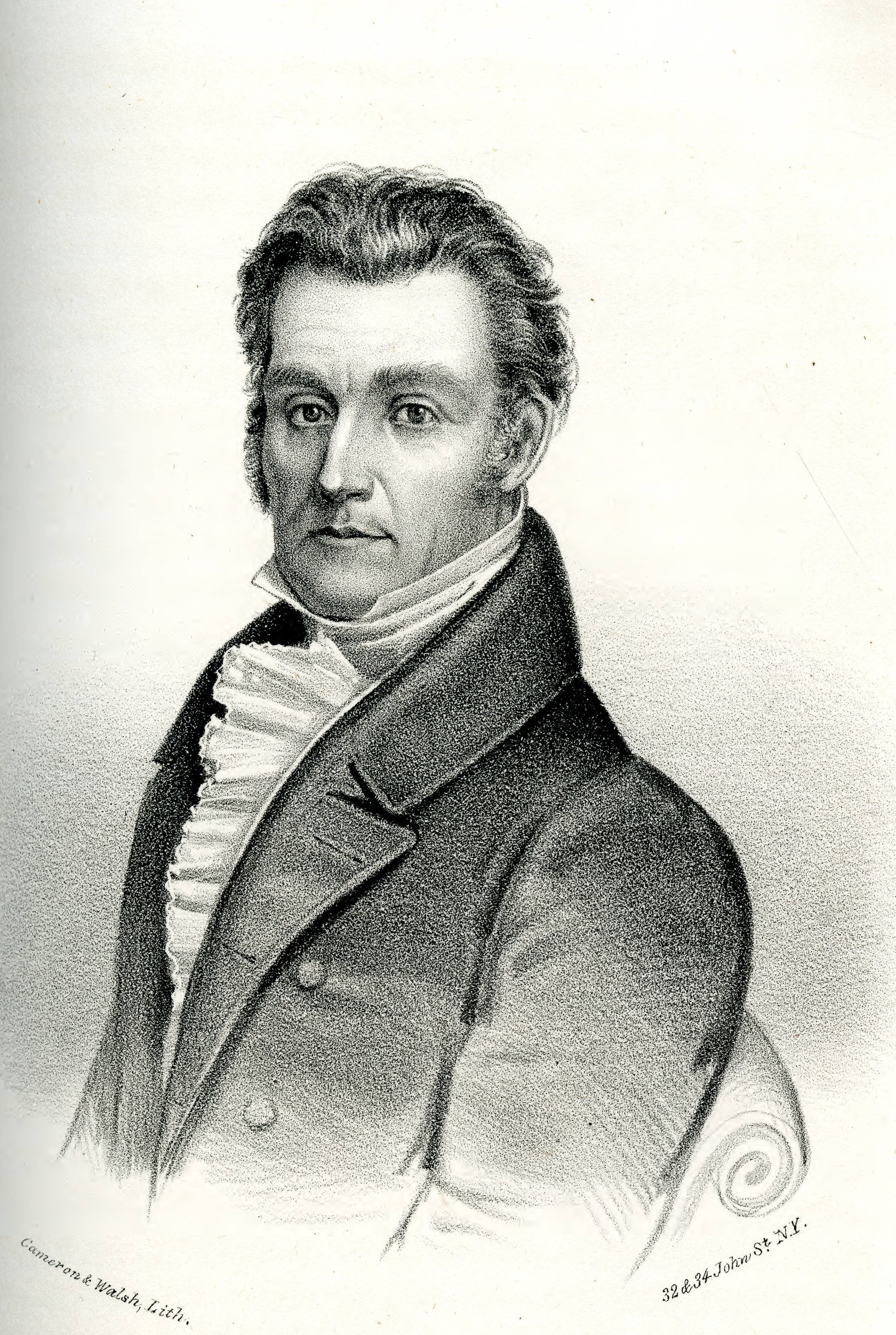
- From 1859's History of Middlebury, Vermont by Samuel Swift

Associate Justice of the Vermont Supreme Court
- In office 1824–1825
- Preceded by: Charles K. Williams
- Succeeded by: Samuel Prentiss
- In office 1817–1822
- Preceded by: James Fisk
- Succeeded by: Charles K. Williams

Personal details
- Born: 1773 Russell, Massachusetts, U.S.
- Died: March 9, 1841 (aged 67) Middlebury, Vermont
- Resting place: Middlebury Cemetery, Middlebury, Vermont
- Party: Democratic-Republican
- Spouse: Sarah Porter Fitch (m. 1809–1841, his death)
- Children: 7
- Education: Yale University; Middlebury College
- Occupation: Attorney

Joel Doolittle (April, 1773/1774 – March 9, 1841) was a Vermont attorney, judge and politician. He served as a member of the Vermont House of Representatives, a member of the state executive council, president of the state Council of Censors, and a justice of the Vermont Supreme Court.

== Biography ==
Joel Doolittle was born in Russell, Massachusetts in April, 1773 (or 1774), the son of Titus and Mary (Lewis) Doolittle. He attended Williams College from 1795 to 1797, and graduated from Yale University in 1799. After graduation, Doolittle settled in Middlebury, Vermont to work as one of the first two faculty members at Middlebury College while also continuing his own studies, both at the college and in a local law office. He was admitted to the bar in 1801, and received a Master of Arts degree from Middlebury College in 1802.

Doolittle maintained an extensive practice in Middlebury, and was also a sought after legal instructor; among the attorneys who received their training in his office were Asa Aikens and William Slade. During the War of 1812, Doolittle joined the regiment of Vermont Militia that was commanded by Colonel William B. Sumner, and he was subsequently appointed as Sumner's adjutant.

Active politically as a member of the Democratic-Republican Party, in 1815 Doolittle was elected to the Vermont Governor's Council, and he served until 1817. In 1817, Doolittle was elected a justice of the Vermont Supreme Court, and he held this position until 1822. In 1824, he served in the Vermont House of Representatives. Later that year he returned to the court, and he served until 1825.

In 1834, Doolittle was named president of the Vermont Council of Censors, the body which met every seven years to review actions of the state government and ensure their constitutionality.

Doolittle was elected a member of the Middlebury College Corporation in 1819, and he served until his death. He was also active in the Episcopal denomination, and was one of the founders of St. Steven's church in Middlebury.

== Death and burial ==
Doolittle died in Middlebury on March 9, 1841. He was buried at Middlebury Cemetery (also known as West Cemetery).

== Family ==
In 1809, Doolittle married Sarah Porter Fitch (1790–1875) of Pawlet, Vermont. Their children included:

- John Titus (1811–1871), an attorney and judge, and the husband of Ann M. Marshall of Painesville, Ohio.
- Charles Hubbard (1814–1890), an attorney and judge, and the husband of Elizabeth Kemp. Charles H. Doolittle resided in Elyria, Ohio.
- Mary Lewis (1817–1830), who died in Middlebury before reaching adulthood.
- Sarah Porter (1819–1898), the wife of Joel S. Alvord of Painesville, Ohio.
- Elizabeth B. (1821–1886), the wife of Henry C. Gray of Painesville, Ohio.
- Joel Jr. (1822–1884), a resident of Painesville, Ohio who operated a real estate and insurance business and held local offices including village assessor. He never married or had children.
- Mark R. (1824–1897), the husband of Alta B. Briggs, and a newspaper publisher and editor in Painesville, Ohio.

== Sources ==
=== Books ===
- Lawrence, John S. (1910). The Descendants of Moses and Sarah Kilham Porter of Pawlet, Vermont. Grand Rapids, MI: F. A. Onderdonk.
- Swift, Samuel (1859). History of the Town of Middlebury. Middlebury, VT: A. H. Copeland.
- Ullery, Jacob G. (1894). Men of Vermont Illustrated. Brattleboro, VT: Transcript Publishing Company.
- Wiley, Edgar J. (1917). Catalogue of Officers and Students of Middlebury College. Middlebury College: Middlebury, VT.

=== Internet ===
- Selleck, Ron; Selleck, Sally; Williams, Linda (2002). "Index, West Cemetery, Middlebury, Vermont". Middlebury.edu. Middlebury, VT: Middlebury College.

=== Newspapers ===
- "Married, Joel Doolittle, Esq. and Miss Sally Fitch". Rutland Herald. Rutland, VT. November 8, 1809 – via Newspapers.com.

Party political offices
First	Democratic nominee for Governor of Vermont; 1824, 1826, 1827, 1828, 1829	Succeeded by Ezra Meech
Political offices
Preceded by James Fisk	Justice of the Vermont Supreme Court; 1817–1822	Succeeded by Charles K. Williams
Preceded by Charles K. Williams	Justice of the Vermont Supreme Court; 1824–1825	Succeeded by Samuel Prentiss
