= George Hadfield (architect) =

American architect

George Hadfield (1763 – 6 February 1826) was born in Livorno, Grand Duchy of Tuscany, of English parents, who were hotel keepers. He studied at the Royal Academy, and worked with James Wyatt for six years before emigrating to the United States. He was the brother of painter, musician, and educator Maria Cosway.

== Life and career ==
He was appointed superintendent of the United States Capitol's construction on 15 October 1795, and continued in that position until June 1798, resigning after an argument with William Thornton. He is credited with part of the design of the original Capitol building such as the north wing, but little of the related papers remain.

He is buried in Congressional Cemetery in Washington, D.C.

== List of works ==
- Original Treasury Department building, drew plans in 1798, completed in 1800; partially destroyed by fire in 1801 and burned by British forces in 1814
- Navy Department, 1800
- Washington Jail, 1801, later converted to a hospital, burned in 1861
- Marine Corps Commandant's House, 1801–1805
- Arlington House (Custis-Lee Mansion), 1818
- District of Columbia City Hall, 1820
- Van Ness Mausoleum

=== Possible works ===
- Historic Huntley

=== Other ===
There are other works. However they are not easily identified, since they are not in the Greek Revival style. For example, Hadfield is credited with alterations to The Octagon House.

== Gallery ==
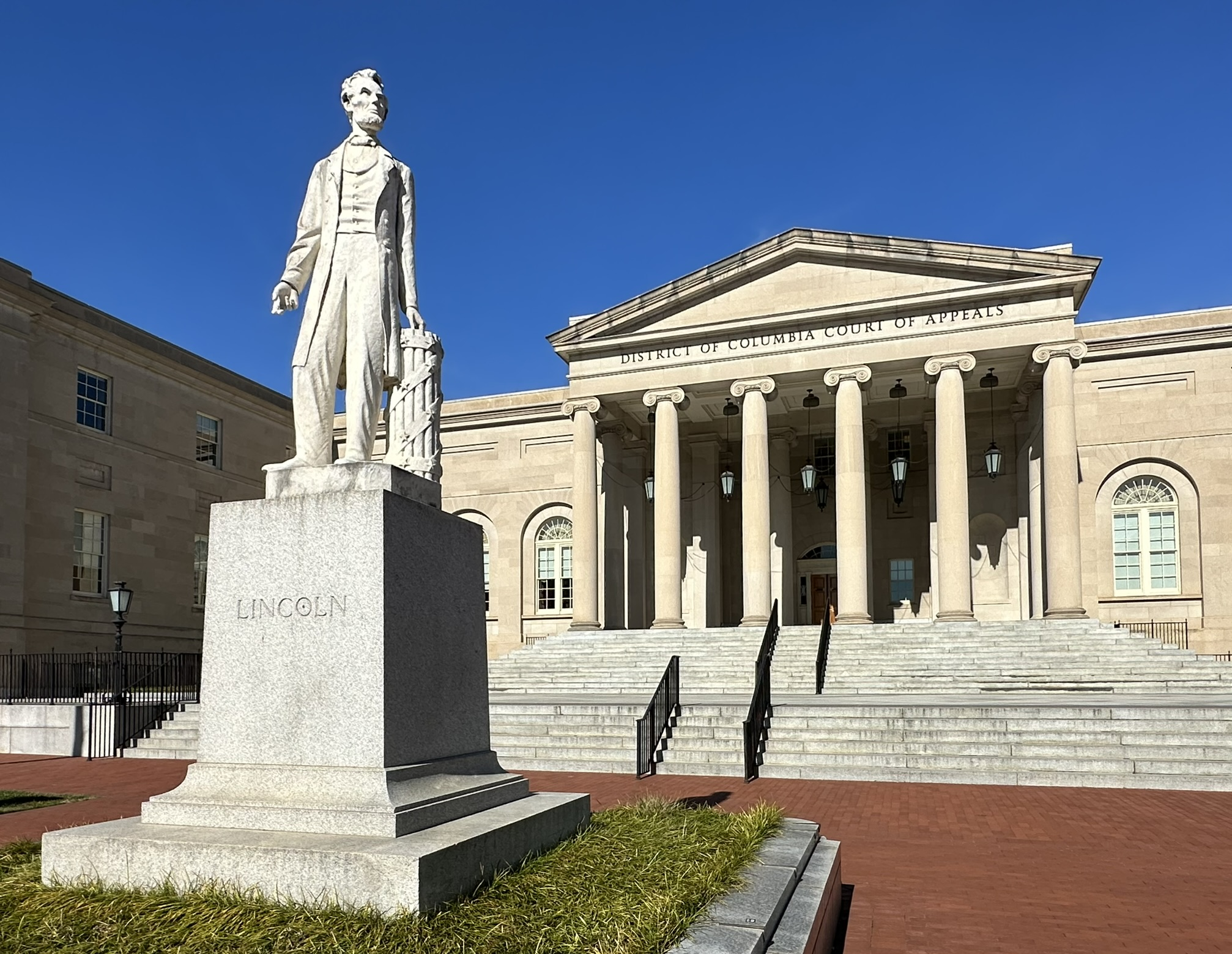
District of Columbia City Hall

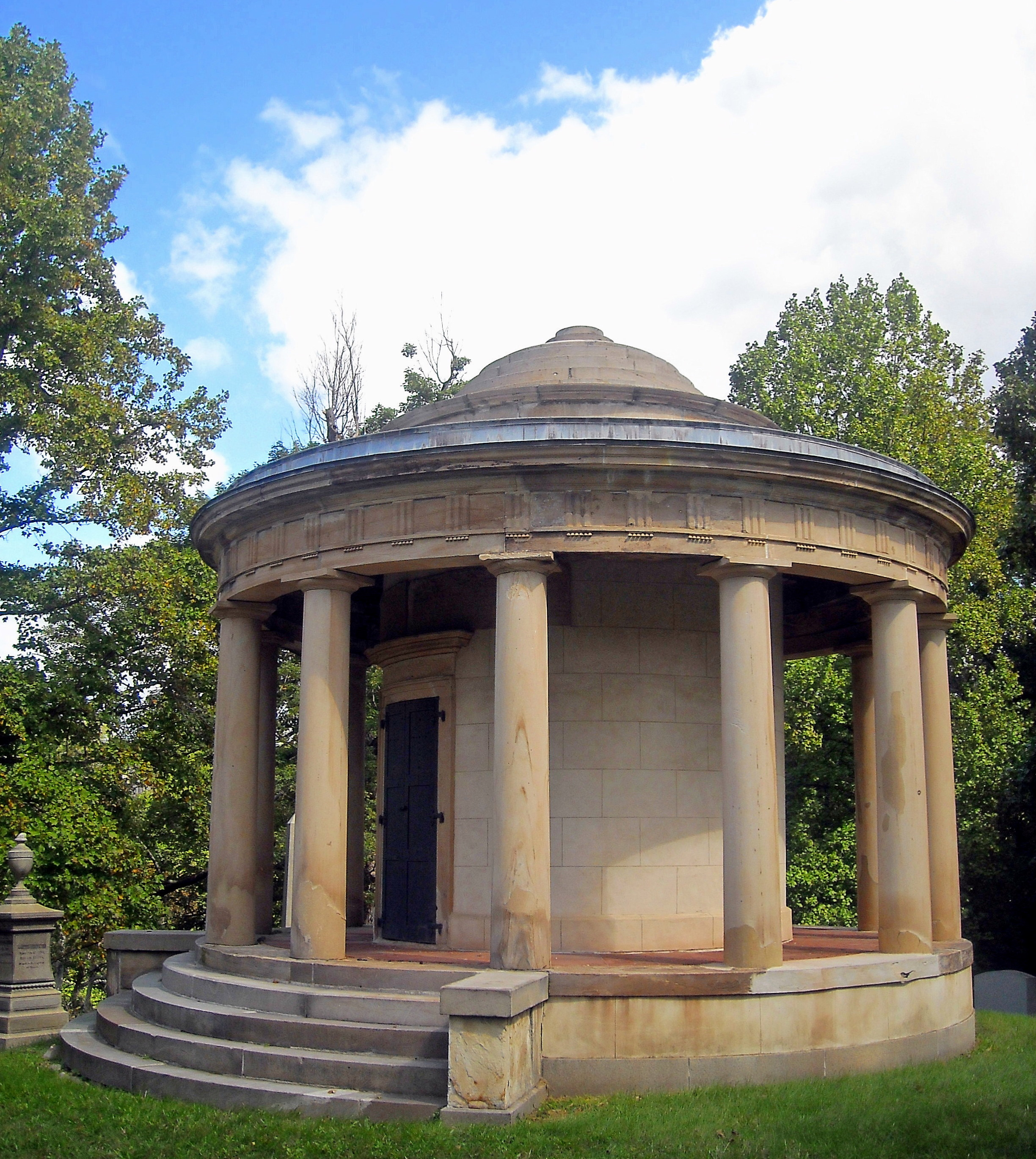
Van Ness Mausoleum

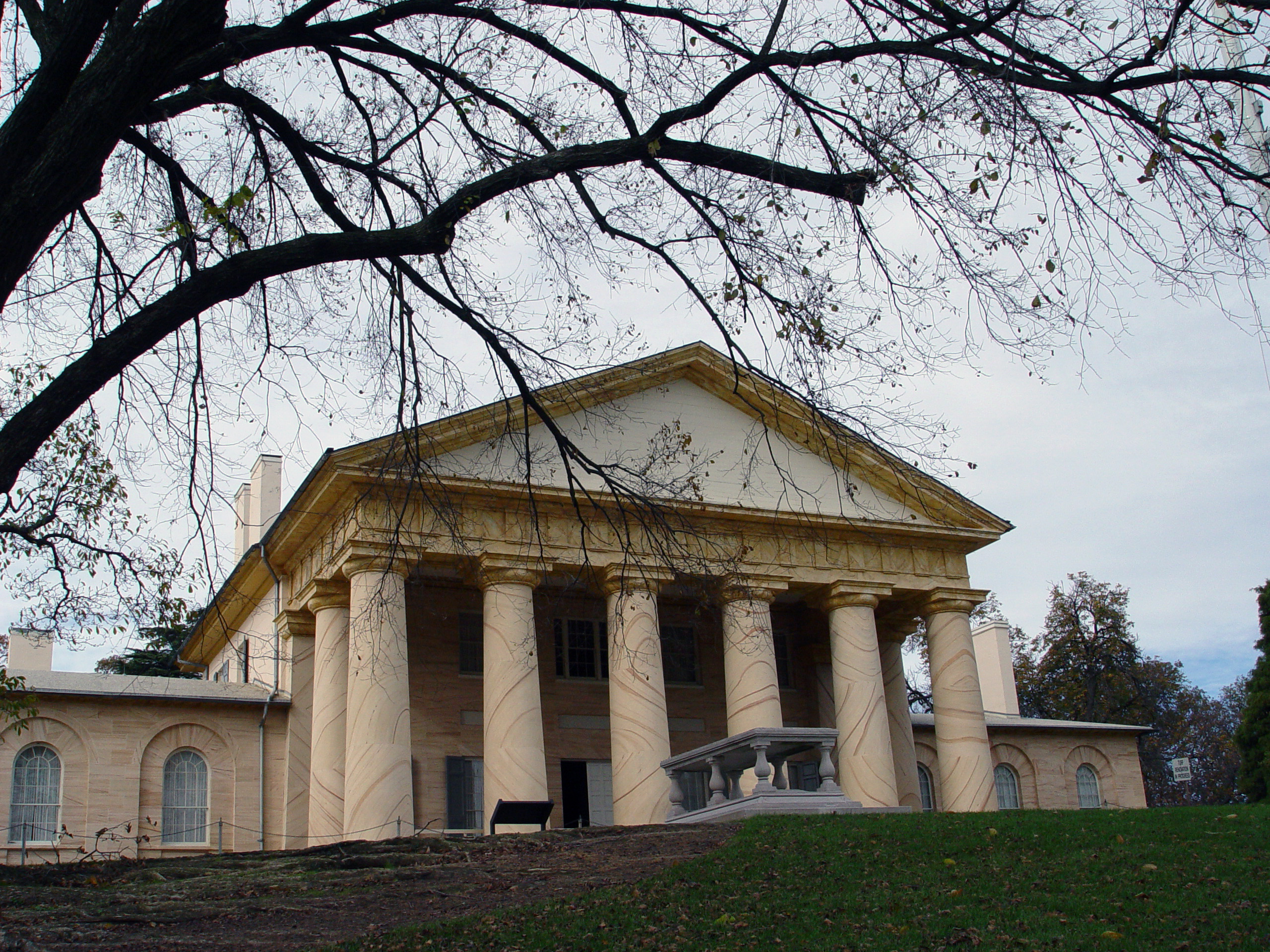
Front view of Arlington House

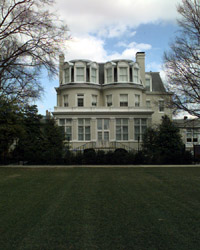
Commandant of the Marine Corps' house at 8th & I SE

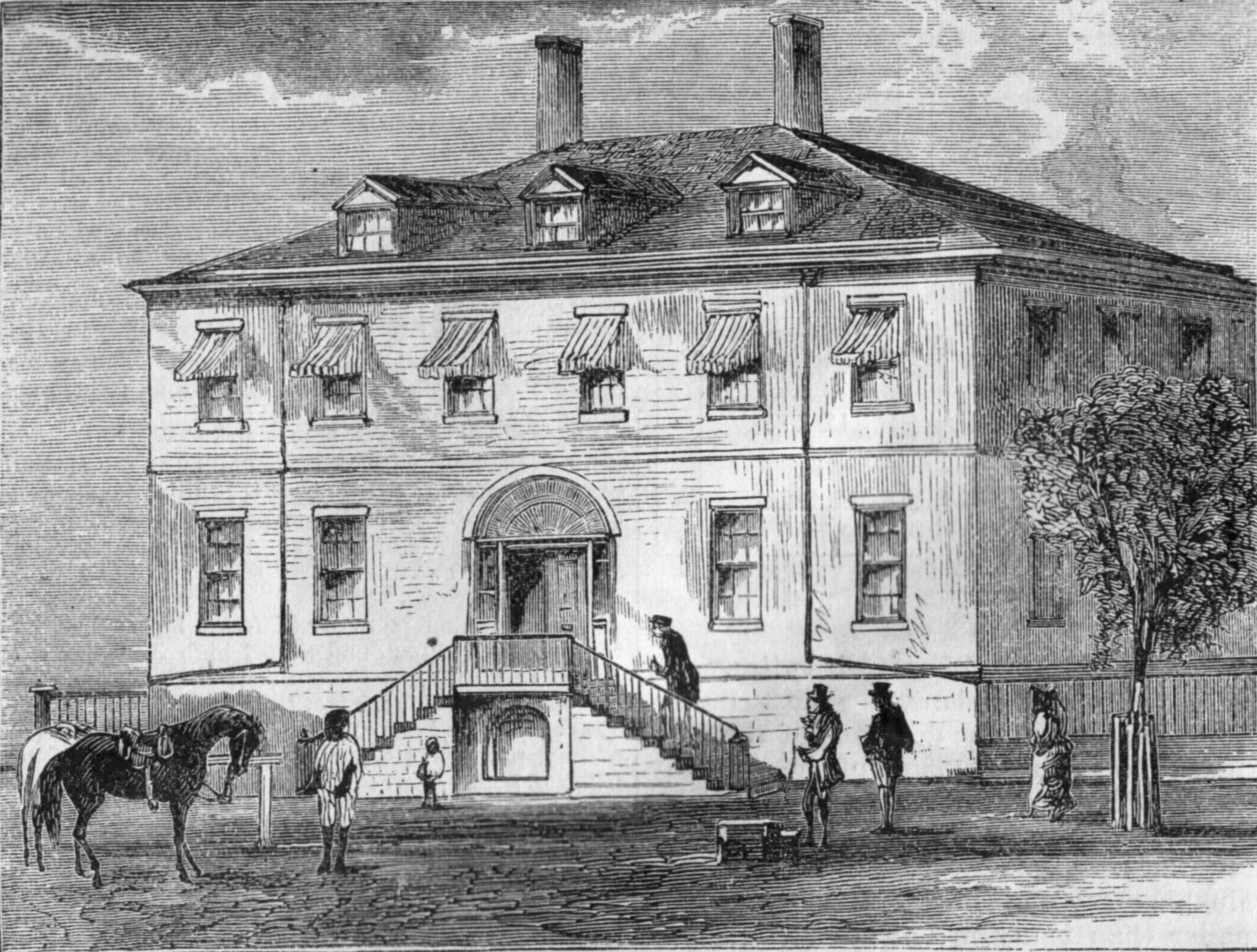
Original U.S. Treasury building.

== See also ==
- Étienne Sulpice Hallet
- James Hoban
- Benjamin Latrobe
