= Cornelius P. Van Ness =

American judge (1782–1852)

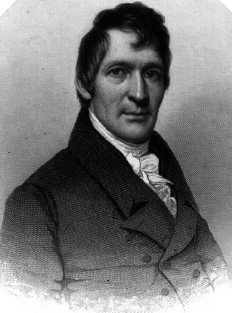

Collector of the Port of New York
- In office 1844–1845
- President: John Tyler
- Preceded by: Edward Curtis
- Succeeded by: Cornelius Lawrence

8th Envoy Extraordinary and Minister Plenipotentiary to Spain
- In office December 9, 1829 – December 21, 1836
- Appointed by: Andrew Jackson
- Preceded by: Alexander Hill Everett
- Succeeded by: John Eaton

10th Governor of Vermont
- In office October 10, 1823 – October 13, 1826
- Lieutenant: Aaron Leland
- Preceded by: Richard Skinner
- Succeeded by: Ezra Butler

Chief Justice of the Vermont Supreme Court
- In office 1821–1823
- Preceded by: Dudley Chase
- Succeeded by: Richard Skinner

Member of the Vermont House of Representatives from Burlington
- In office 1818–1822
- Preceded by: Luther Loomis
- Succeeded by: George Robinson

United States Attorney for the District of Vermont
- In office 1810–1813
- President: James Madison
- Preceded by: David Fay
- Succeeded by: Titus Hutchinson

Personal details
- Born: Cornelius Peter Van Ness; January 26, 1782 Kinderhook, New York, U.S.
- Died: December 15, 1852 (aged 70) Philadelphia, Pennsylvania, U.S.
- Party: Democratic-Republican; Democratic
- Spouse(s): Rhoda Savage; Magdalena Allus
- Children: 5, including James
- Relatives: John P. Van Ness (brother); William P. Van Ness (brother)
- Education: Washington Seminary
- Profession: Lawyer

Cornelius Peter Van Ness (January 26, 1782 – May 2, 1852) was an American politician and diplomat who served as the tenth governor of Vermont from 1823 to 1826 and Envoy Extraordinary and Minister Plenipotentiary to the Kingdom of Spain from 1829 to 1836. Van Ness was a Democratic-Republican and later a Democrat.

== Early life ==
Van Ness was born in Kinderhook, New York, on January 26, 1782, to a family of Dutch Americans. His father was Judge Peter Van Ness (1734–1804), who owned most of the land which President Martin Van Buren later purchased for construction of the Lindenwald estate. Cornelius Van Ness was the brother of William P. Van Ness and John Peter Van Ness.

== Career ==
Cornelius Van Ness attended Washington Seminary, and in 1800 he began to study at his brother William's law office in New York City at the same time as Martin Van Buren. Van Ness was admitted to the bar four years later, and moved to St. Albans, Vermont, in 1806. He relocated to Burlington, Vermont, in 1809 when he was appointed United States district attorney for the district of Vermont. He was made collector of customs for the district of Vermont in 1813 and in 1816 President James Madison named Van Ness one of the federal commissioners who negotiated with commissioners from Great Britain to settle the northeastern boundary between the United States and Canada.

Initially a member of the Democratic-Republican Party and later a Democrat, he was elected to the Vermont House of Representatives from 1818 to 1822. He served as Chief Justice of the Supreme Court of Vermont from 1821 to 1823. In 1823 he became Governor of Vermont. After being twice re-elected, in 1826 he declined re-election and went back to practicing law until 1829 when he became envoy extraordinary and minister plenipotentiary to the court of Spain. William T. Barry was appointed to the post in April, 1835, but died in Liverpool on August 30, without assuming his duties in Spain. President Jackson then appointed John H. Eaton, and Van Ness departed on December 21, 1836.

From 1844 to 1845 Van Ness was Collector of the Port of New York.

== Personal life ==
He married twice. His first wife was Rhoda Savage of Chatham, New York, with whom he had five children. She died in 1834 while her husband was Minister to Spain. Cornelius Van Ness later married a Spanish woman, Madalena (or Magdalena) Allus, who survived him. Madalena Van Ness later filed a claim with Congress to reimburse the Van Ness family for fees Van Ness had not collected while he was Collector of Customs for Vermont during the War of 1812. His children with Rhoda were:

- Marcia Van Ness (1807–1881), who married William Gore Ouseley (1797–1866), the British diplomat, in 1827.
- James Van Ness (1808–1872), who became Mayor of San Francisco, and who married Caroline Frances James Lesley (1808–1858).
- Cornelia Van Ness (1810–1876), who married James I. Roosevelt (1795–1875), a member of the U.S. House of Representatives.
- Cornelius Van Ness (1812–1842)
- George Van Ness (1817–1855)

Van Ness died at the Girard House hotel in Philadelphia, Pennsylvania, on December 15, 1852, and is interred in Van Ness Mausoleum with his brother John P. Van Ness. The mausoleum originally stood on H Street, and was later moved to Oak Hill Cemetery in Washington, D.C.

Party political offices
Preceded by Richard Skinner	Democratic-Republican nominee for Governor of Vermont; 1823, 1824, 1825	Succeeded by None
Legal offices
Preceded by David Fay	United States Attorney for the District of Vermont; 1810-1813	Succeeded by Titus Hutchinson
Political offices
Preceded by Richard Skinner	Governor of Vermont; 1823-1826	Succeeded by Ezra Butler
Diplomatic posts
Preceded by Alexander H. Everett	U.S. Minister to Spain; 1829–1836	Succeeded by William T. Barry
Government offices
Preceded by Edward Curtis	Collector of the Port of New York; 1844–1845	Succeeded by Cornelius Lawrence
