= John Peter Van Ness =

American politician

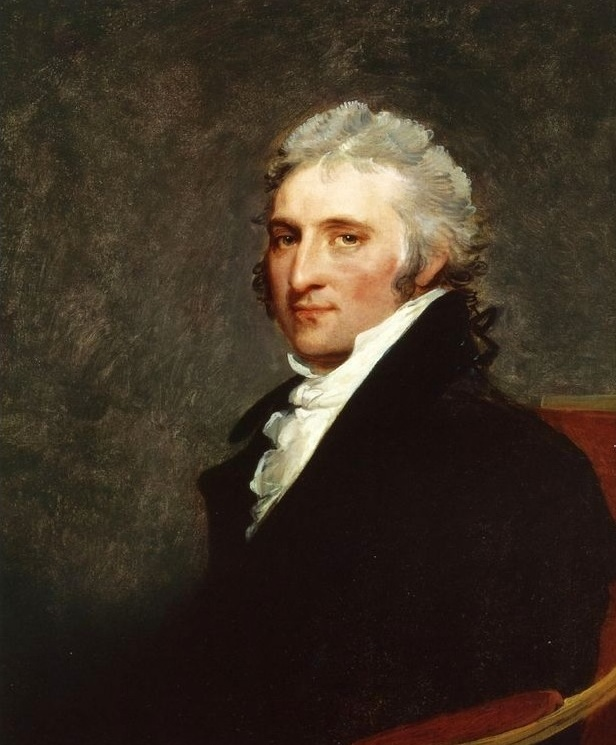
- Gilbert Stuart, John Peter Van Ness, 1805, on display at Edgewater, a historic mansion in Barrytown, New York.

10th Mayor of the City of Washington, D.C.
- In office June 14, 1830 – June 9, 1834
- Preceded by: Joseph Gales Jr.
- Succeeded by: William A. Bradley

Member of the U.S. House of Representatives from New York's 6th district
- In office October 6, 1801 – January 17, 1803
- Preceded by: John Bird
- Succeeded by: Isaac Bloom

Personal details
- Born: Johannes Petrus Van Ness; November 4, 1769 Ghent, Province of New York, British America
- Died: March 7, 1846 (aged 76) Washington, D.C., U.S.
- Resting place: Oak Hill Cemetery; Washington, D.C., U.S.
- Party: Democratic-Republican
- Spouse: Marcia Burns (m. 1802; died 1832)
- Relations: William Van Ness (brother); Cornelius Van Ness (brother)
- Parent(s): Peter Van Ness; Elbertje Hogeboom
- Education: Washington Seminary; Columbia College

Military service
- Allegiance: United States
- Branch/service: District of Columbia Militia
- Years of service: 1802-1814
- Rank: Major General
- Commands: 1st Legion, D.C. Militia; D.C. Militia
- Battles/wars: War of 1812; Battle of Bladensburg; Burning of Washington

Johannes Petrus "John Peter" Van Ness (November 4, 1769 – March 7, 1846) was an American politician who served as a U.S. representative from New York from 1801 to 1803 and Mayor of Washington, D.C. from 1830 to 1834.

== Early life ==
Van Ness was born in Ghent in the Province of New York on November 4, 1769. He was the son of Elbertje Hogeboom (1743–1806) and Judge Peter Van Ness (1734–1804) and was a member of an old Dutch family. His father was an officer during the American Revolution and a New York politician, who owned land and a brick mansion in Columbia County. Martin Van Buren later bought much of the land and the mansion became Van Buren's home Lindenwald. The 1790 census shows that Peter Van Ness had 10 enslaved people in the household.

John Peter was the older brother of William P. Van Ness (1778–1826), a federal judge, and Cornelius P. Van Ness (1782–1852), an Ambassador to Spain and Governor of Vermont.

He completed preparatory studies at Washington Seminary and attended Columbia College in New York City. He studied law and was admitted to the bar, but never practiced.

== Career ==
Van Ness was elected as a Democratic-Republican to New York's 6th congressional district for the 7th United States Congress to fill the vacancy caused by the resignation of John Bird and took his seat on October 6, 1801. In April 1802, he was defeated for re-election by Federalist Henry W. Livingston.

On January 17, 1803, Van Ness's seat was declared vacant, because in 1802 he had been appointed by President Thomas Jefferson as a major in the District of Columbia militia and under the U.S. Constitution no member of Congress could hold another federal office. He then made Washington his home and was president of the second council in 1803. He was promoted to the rank of lieutenant colonel commandant of the first legion of militia in 1805, brigadier general in 1811, and major general in 1813. From 1811 to 1814, he served as the second Commanding General of the District of Columbia National Guard. Van Ness took part in the War of 1812; when British ships conducted reconnaissance of the Potomac River in May 1814, he activated members of the militia's cavalry units to observe the British and provide report of their activities. He also recommended keeping members of the militia on federal active duty so they could respond to a British attack if necessary, but John Armstrong Jr., the Secretary of War, declined. In the period leading up to the August 1814 Battle of Bladensburg and subsequent Burning of Washington, Van Ness was prevented from serving in active field command because he would have outranked William H. Winder, who had been assigned as the overall U.S. commander. President James Madison directed Armstrong to assign Van Ness to a suitable alternate position, but Armstrong did not do so. Instead, Van Ness took the initiative to organize a group of volunteers who dug trenches for U.S. forces prior to the Bladensburg fight.

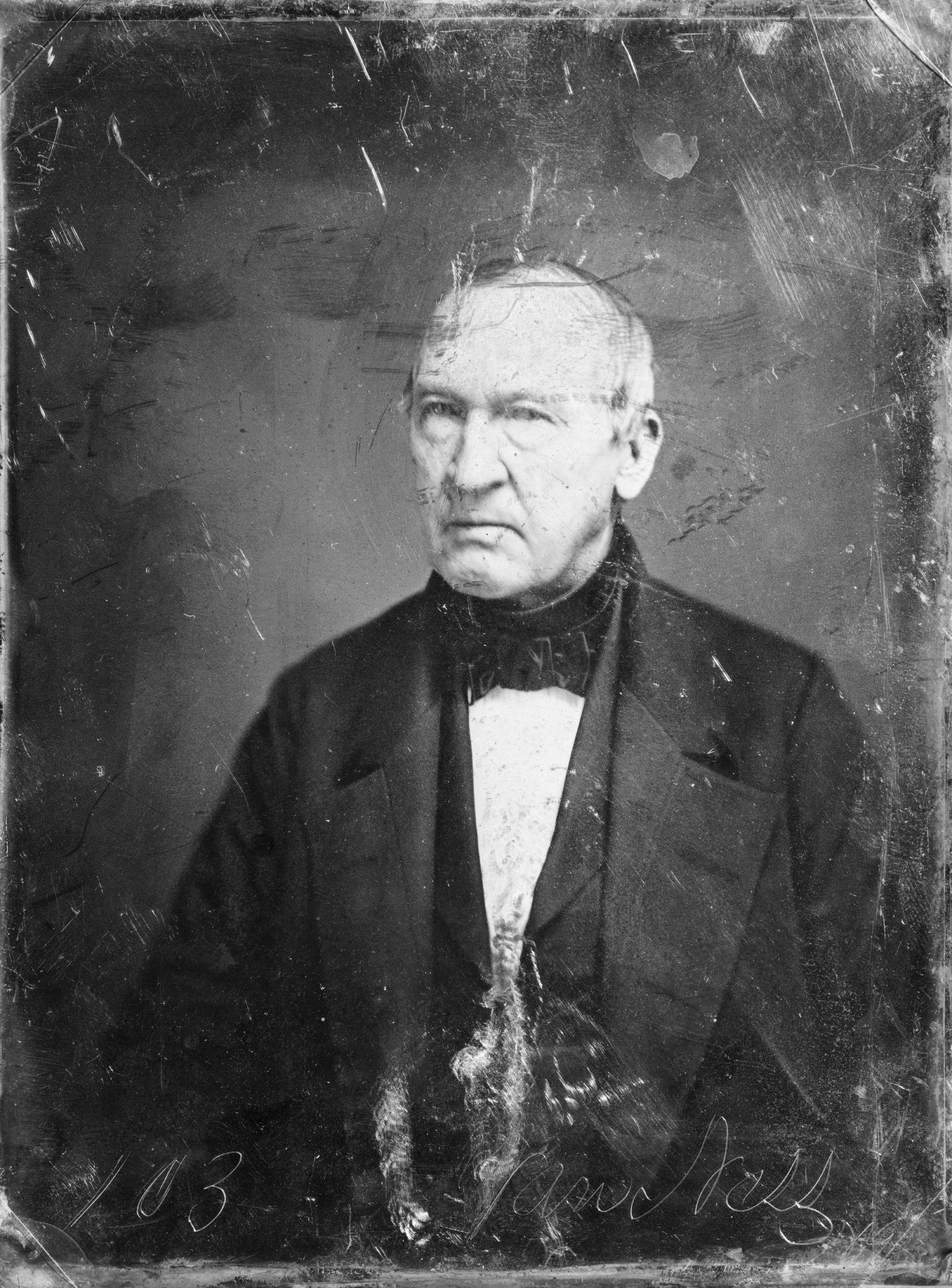
Mathew Brady, John Peter Van Ness, between 1844 and 1846, Library of Congress Prints and Photographs Division, Daguerreotype collection

During the 1820s, Van Ness was a member of the Columbian Institute for the Promotion of Arts and Sciences. He was a friend of Washington Irving. Van Ness was a slaveowner.

In 1829, he was an alderman of the city of Washington and from 1830 to 1834, Van Ness was the mayor of Washington, D.C.

Van Ness was second vice president of the Washington National Monument Society in 1833 and was president of the commissioners of the Washington City Canal in 1834, and president of the branch bank of the United States at Washington, D.C.; he was also president of the National Metropolitan Bank from 1814 until his death 1846.

=== Founding of the Washington Jockey Club ===
In 1802, the Washington Jockey Club sought a new site for the track that lay the rear of what is now the site of Decatur House at H Street and Jackson Place, crossing Seventeenth Street and Pennsylvania Avenue to Twentieth Street-today the Eisenhower Executive Office Building. Van Ness, along with John Tayloe III and Charles Carnan Ridgely and the support of Dr. William Thornton, G. W. P. Custis, John Threlkeld of Georgetown, and George Calvert of Riversdale, the contests were moved to Meridian Hill, south of Columbia Road between Fourteenth and Sixteenth Streets, and were conducted at the Holmstead Farm's one mile oval track.

== Personal life ==
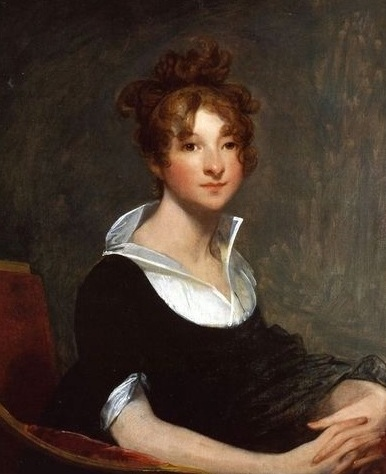
Gilbert Stuart, Marcia Van Ness, 1805, original on display at Edgewater, a historic mansion in Barrytown, New York.

In 1802, Van Ness married Marcia Burns (1782–1832), the daughter of David Burnes (1739–1800) and M. Anne (née Wightt) (1740–1807). She was a prominent philanthropist herself, and supporter of the orphan asylum. Together, they were the parents of Ann Elbertina Van Ness (1803–1823), who married Arthur Middleton (1795-1853). He was the oldest son of Governor Henry Middleton of South Carolina and the grandson of Arthur Middleton, a signer of the Declaration of Independence.

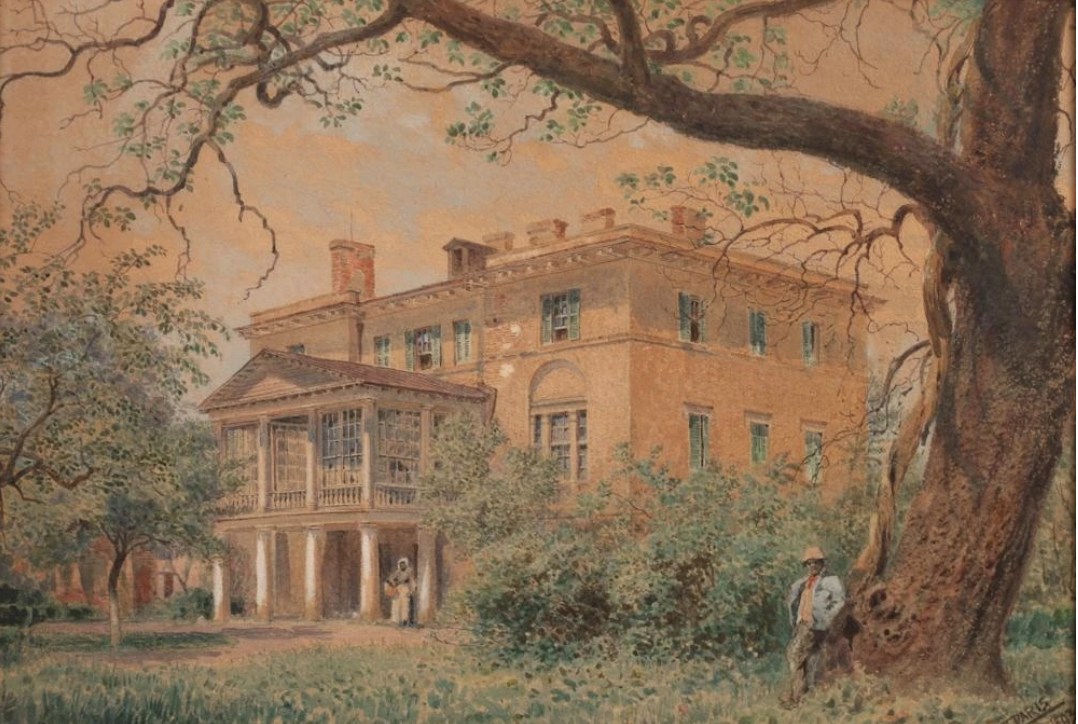
Walter Paris, Van Ness Mansion, 1893, watercolor. The house built by Benjamin Henry Latrobe was completed in 1816.

The couple lived at the Van Ness Mansion, constructed in 1813 to 1816, located at Constitution Avenue and 17th Street, and 18th Street, N.W. It was demolished for the Pan American Union Building.

Van Ness died on March 7, 1846, and was entombed in the Van Ness Mausoleum, which originally stood on H Street, N.W., between Ninth and Tenth Streets in Washington, D.C. His wife who had died September 9, 1832, was also entombed there. In 1872, the mausoleum and the Van Ness remains were moved to Oak Hill Cemetery in Georgetown.

=== Philanthropy ===
Although not a Catholic, Van Ness donated the land on which the cornerstone of St. Mary Mother of God church, at the southeast corner of Fifth Street and H Street, N.W. would be laid on March 25, 1846. The land donation was made with the stipulations that Catholic worship should begin there within one year, ensuring the completion of the church on October 18, 1846, and that worship be regularly continued there. If Catholic worship were to ever cease at the location, the land would revert to the Van Ness family. A new building was constructed in 1890, and the site continues to be the home of St. Mary Mother of God church.

U.S. House of Representatives
Preceded by John Bird	Member of the U.S. House of Representatives from New York's 6th congressional district 1801–1803	Succeeded by Isaac Bloom
Political offices
Preceded by Joseph Gales Jr.	Mayor of Washington, D.C. 1830–1834	Succeeded by William A. Bradley
