= Marcia Van Ness =

American socialite (1782–1832)

Marcia Burnes Van Ness
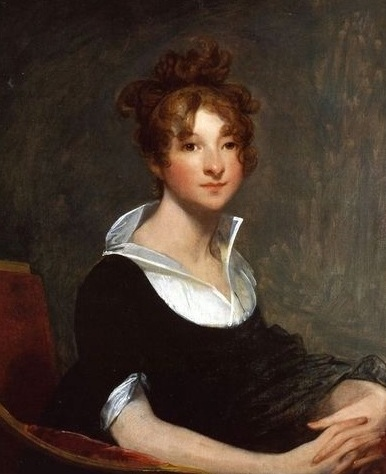
- Oil painting of Van Ness by Gilbert Stuart, 1805
- Born: Marcia Burnes; May 9, 1782; Washington City, British America
- Died: September 10, 1832 (aged 50)
- Resting place: Van Ness Mausoleum; Oak Hill Cemetery; Washington, D.C., U.S.
- Spouse: John Peter Van Ness (m. 1802)
- Children: 1
- Father: David Burnes

Marcia Burnes Van Ness (May 9, 1782 – September 10, 1832) was an American socialite in Washington City, who some called "the heiress of Washington City" after her father's death. She helped found and was the first directress of the Washington City Orphan Asylum as the result of many children become homeless after the death of their parents during the War of 1812. She and her husband John Peter Van Ness entertained Washington dignitaries at their residence, Van Ness Mansion.

== Early life ==
Marcia Burnes was born on May 9, 1782, to Ann (née Wightt) and David Burnes on their plantation in what would become Washington City (present day Washington, D.C.). Her father was a Scottish farmer, landowner and slave owner. He owned 600 acres of land and used it for tobacco and corn crops. Her father sold the land in 1791 to make the city of Washington, which made the family wealthy.

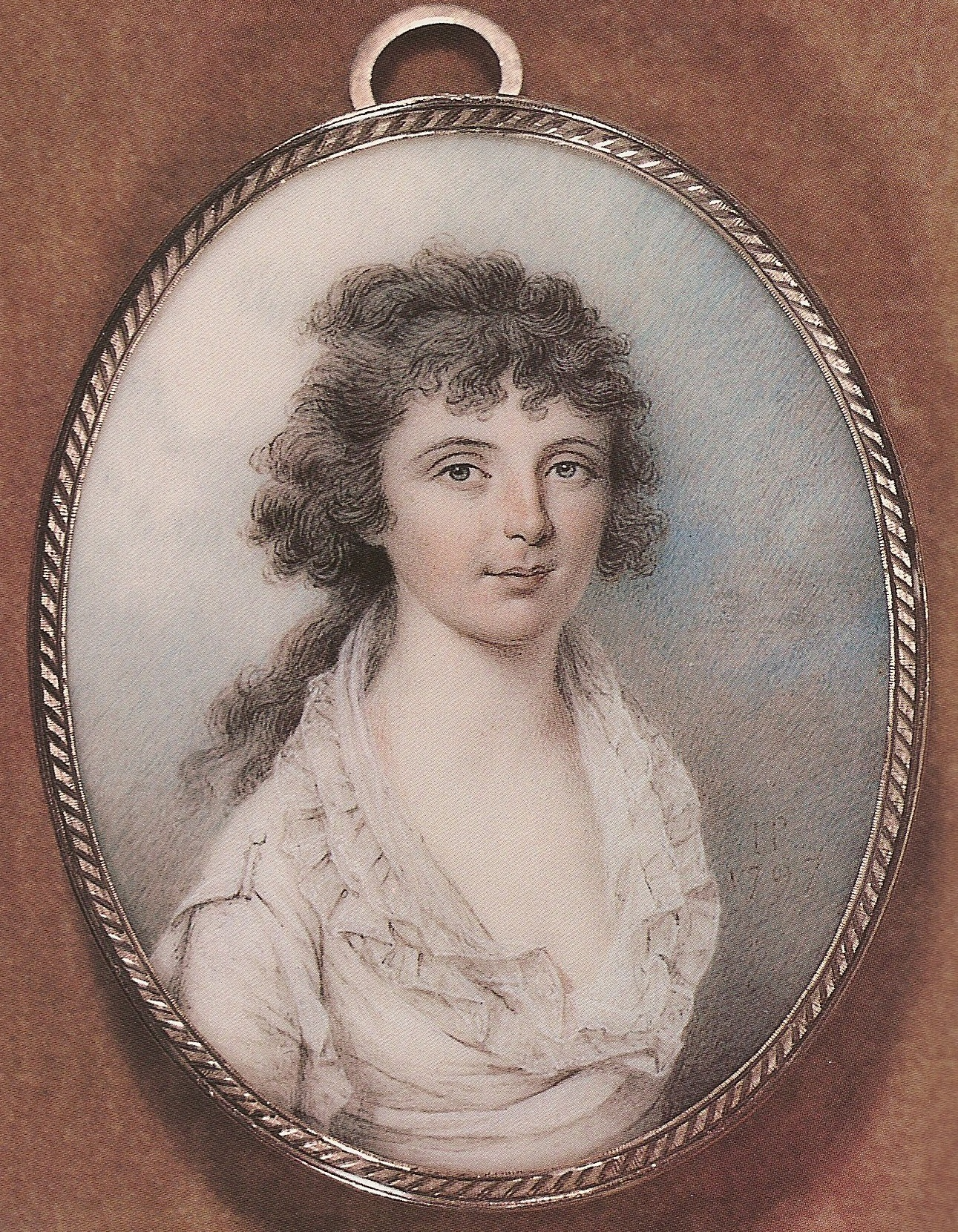
Miniature of Burnes at the age of fifteen painted by Charles Willson Peale

Burnes attended the School for Young Ladies in Georgetown. She then went to Baltimore to complete her education at Madame Lacomb's Female Academy, while staying with the lawyer Luther Martin and his family. Her brother, John, studied law under Luther Martin. While staying with the Martins, painter Charles Willson Peale painted a miniature of her at the age of fifteen. In 1798, Burnes returned to Washington. After the death of her father in 1799, many referred to Burnes as "the heiress of Washington City".

== Life ==
In 1801, Burnes met John Peter Van Ness, a Congressman from New York, and they married on May 2, 1802. Her husband built them a house at D and 12 Street in Washington. She entertained numerous guests, including Washington Irving at this house. In 1803, their daughter, Ann Elbertina, was born. In 1807, her mother died and she was left with her father's fortune estimated to be at least US$1,500,000 (equivalent to about $32,983,000 in 2025).

Van Ness threw parties and entertained guests in Washington City, including President James Madison and his wife, Dolley Madison. She was friends with Dolley Madison. During the Burning of Washington, the Van Ness family left the city and returned to both of their houses, the D Street house and a cottage on 17th Street unharmed. After returning to Washington, Madison named her husband in charge of the reconstruction of the destroyed government buildings. Van Ness, along with Elizabeth Jackson Reilly Brown and Margaret Bayard Smith, the wives of Obadiah Brown and Harrison Smith, established a plan to shelter orphans after the conflict. Van Ness was then named the Second Directress of the Washington City Orphan Asylum (now Hillcrest Children and Family Center).

Around 1816, Benjamin Henry Latrobe built the Van Ness Mansion on 17th Street. They entertained the Madisons, James Monroe, George Washington Parke Custis and John Tayloe III at their mansion. The mansion was described as the "finest house in America". Around 1822, her daughter, Ann Albertina, and her granddaughter, Marcia Helen, died and were buried at Oak Hill Cemetery. Afterward, her husband became mayor of Washington City.

== Death ==
Van Ness died on September 9, 1832. She was buried on September 10 at the Van Ness Mausoleum at Mausoleum Square. Her funeral marked the first time the United States Congress adjourned for the funeral of a woman. The mausoleum was moved to Oak Hill Cemetery in 1872 or 1873.
