= Van Ness Mausoleum =

Gravesite in Washington, D.C.

- U.S. National Register of Historic Places
- U.S. National Historic Landmark District – Contributing property
- D.C. Inventory of Historic Sites
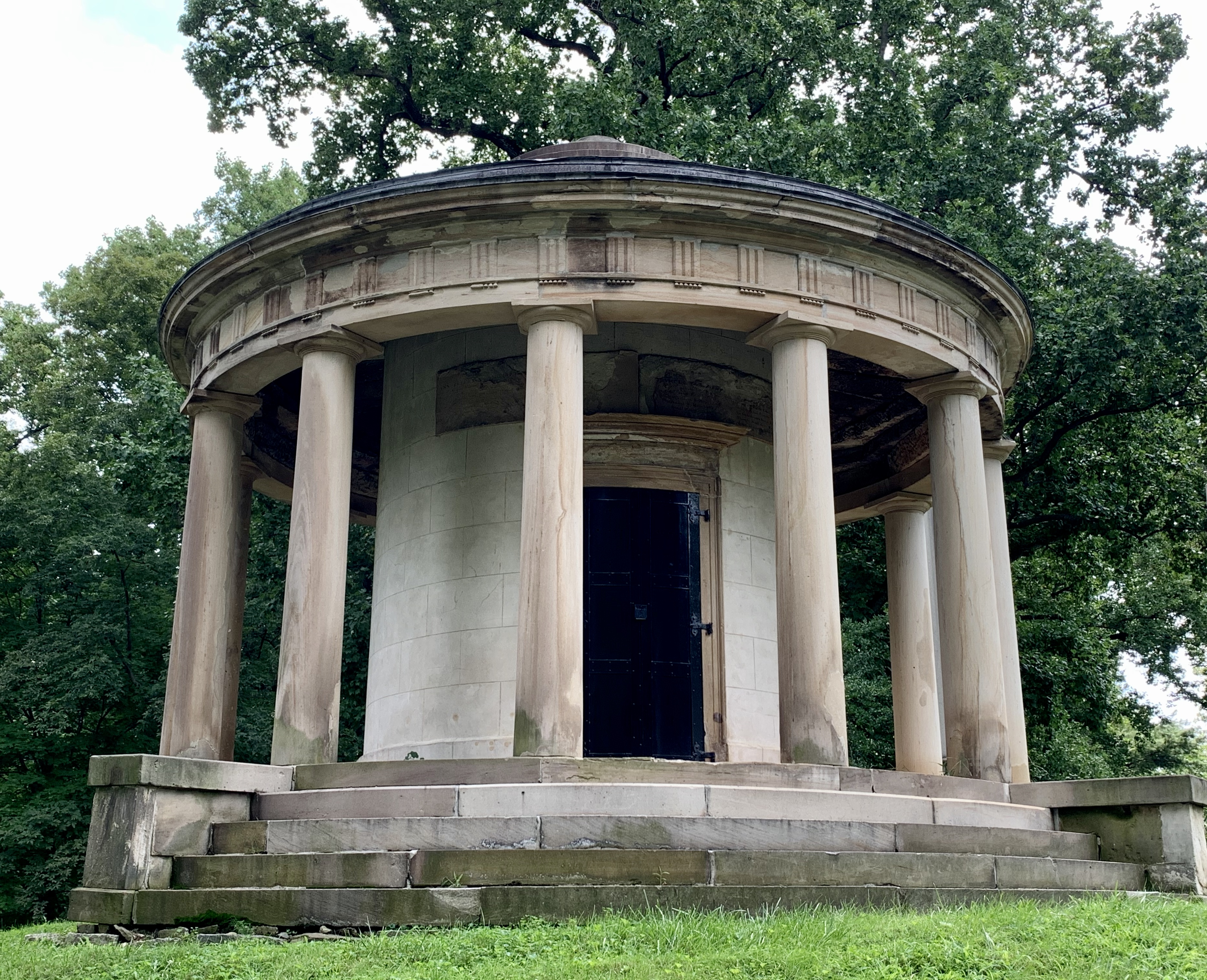

- Location within Washington, D.C.
- Location: Oak Hill Cemetery, 3001 R St. NW, Washington, D.C.
- Coordinates: 38°54′42″N 77°3′16″W
- Built: 1824
- Architect: George Hadfield
- Architectural style: Classical Revival
- Part of: Georgetown Historic District (ID67000025)
- NRHP reference No.: 82001032

Significant dates
- Added to NRHP: December 17, 1982
- Designated DCIHS: November 8, 1964

The Van Ness Mausoleum was designed by George Hadfield. It is said to be a copy of the Temple of Vesta in Rome.

== History ==
The mausoleum was constructed in 1824 for the daughter, Ann Elbertina Middleton, and granddaughter, Marcia Helen Middleton, of Washington City mayor John Peter Van Ness and Marcia Burns Van Ness. Built at an estimated cost of $34,000 with space for 18, it ultimately held 7, including John Peter Van Ness, who was interred inside in 1847. The mausoleum was moved by Colonel W. H. Philip to Oak Hill Cemetery in the Georgetown section of Washington, D.C., in 1872. The structure was put on the National Register of Historic Places in 1982.

== See also ==
- List of public art in Washington, D.C., Ward 2
