= Ezra Butler =

American politician (1763–1838)

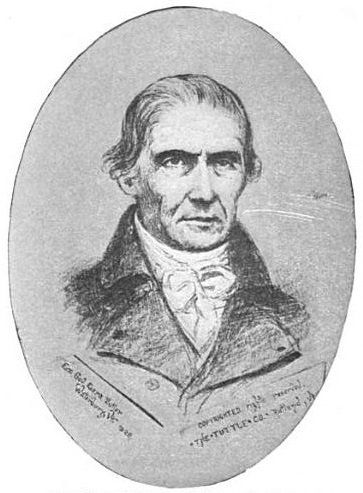

11th Governor of Vermont
- In office October 13, 1826 – October 10, 1828
- Lieutenant: Aaron Leland; Henry Olin
- Preceded by: Cornelius P. Van Ness
- Succeeded by: Samuel C. Crafts

Member of the U.S. House of Representatives from Vermont's at-large district
- In office March 4, 1813 – March 3, 1815
- Preceded by: Seat added
- Succeeded by: John Noyes

Member of the Vermont House of Representatives
- In office 1794–1797; 1799–1804; 1807; 1808

Personal details
- Born: September 24, 1763 Lancaster, Province of Massachusetts Bay, British America
- Died: July 12, 1838 (aged 74) Waterbury, Vermont, U.S.
- Party: Democratic-Republican; National Republican; Anti-Masonic
- Spouse: Tryphena Diggins
- Profession: Lawyer, judge, politician

Ezra Butler (September 24, 1763 – July 12, 1838) was an American clergyman, politician, lawyer, judge, the 11th governor of Vermont, and a United States representative from Vermont.

== Biography ==
Butler was born in Lancaster in the Province of Massachusetts Bay. In 1770 he moved with his parents to West Windsor, Vermont. His mother died while he was still a boy, and, after living with his elder brother for several years, he engaged in agricultural pursuits in Claremont, New Hampshire, until he was an adult. He served in the Continental Army for six months in 1779 during the American Revolution.

== Career ==
In 1775 Butler staked a claim as the second settler in Waterbury, Vermont. He returned in 1776 with his wife, Tryphena Diggins, with whom he eventually had eleven children.

In 1785, Butler studied law in Waterbury, Vermont, and after he passed the bar, in 1786, he practiced law, and served as Town Clerk in 1790. In 1790, he began to think seriously on religious subjects, became a Baptist in 1791, and in 1800 began to preach at Bolton, Vermont. A Baptist church was organized in Waterbury in 1800, and he was its pastor for more than thirty years. He did not allow his ordination to the ministry to interfere with his public career.

Butler was one of the first three selectmen of Waterbury. He was elected member of the Vermont House of Representatives, an office he held from 1794 to 1797; from 1799 to 1804; in 1807; and in 1808. He was the first judge of the Chittenden County Court from 1803 to 1806; Chief Justice in Chittenden County from 1806 to 1811; and Chief Justice of Jefferson County from 1812 to 1825 (excepting periods of congressional service). He was elected as a Democratic-Republican to the Thirteenth Congress and a member of the State Constitutional Convention in 1822.

Butler was elected as a National Republican Governor of Vermont from 1826 to 1828. During his tenure, lotteries were abolished, and legislation was passed to require the examination of teachers.

In the 1832 election for President, Vermont was carried by Anti-Masonic Party candidate William Wirt. Butler was one of Vermont's electors, and cast his vote for Wirt.

== Death ==
Butler died in Waterbury on July 12, 1838, and is interred at Waterbury Cemetery.

Party political offices
First	National Republican nominee for Governor of Vermont; 1826, 1827	Succeeded by Samuel C. Crafts
U.S. House of Representatives
Preceded by District created	Member of the U.S. House of Representatives from Vermont's at-large congressional district 1813–1815	Succeeded by John Noyes
Political offices
Preceded by Cornelius P. Van Ness	Governor of Vermont; 1826–1828	Succeeded by Samuel C. Crafts
