= Aaron Leland =

American politician

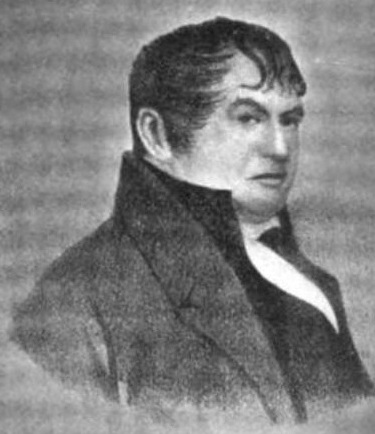

7th Lieutenant Governor of Vermont
- In office 1822–1827
- Governor: Richard Skinner; Cornelius P. Van Ness; Ezra Butler
- Preceded by: William Cahoon
- Succeeded by: Henry Olin

19th Speaker of the Vermont House of Representatives
- In office 1804–1808
- Preceded by: Theophilus Harrington
- Succeeded by: Dudley Chase

Member of the Vermont House of Representatives from Chester
- In office 1813–1815
- Preceded by: William Hosmer
- Succeeded by: Joshua Leland
- In office 1809–1811
- Preceded by: Thomas S. Fullerton
- Succeeded by: William Hosmer
- In office 1801–1808
- Preceded by: Jabez Sargeant
- Succeeded by: Thomas S. Fullerton

Personal details
- Born: May 28, 1761 Holliston, Massachusetts, U.S.
- Died: August 25, 1832 (aged 71) Chester, Vermont, U.S.
- Resting place: Brookside Cemetery, Chester, Vermont
- Party: Democratic-Republican
- Profession: Clergyman

Aaron Leland (May 28, 1761 – August 25, 1832) was a minister and politician who served as the seventh lieutenant governor of Vermont.

== Biography ==
Aaron Leland was born in Holliston, Massachusetts, on May 28, 1761. He was ordained as a Baptist minister in 1785 and settled in Chester, Vermont, in 1786. Leland was a successful pastor and preacher, building up a church which gave rise to congregations in Andover and Grafton, Massachusetts, and Weathersfield and Jamaica, Vermont.

Active in politics as a Democratic-Republican, Leland served in local offices including Town Clerk and Selectman, and was Windsor County Assistant Judge for eighteen years. He also served in the Vermont House of Representatives from 1801 to 1808 and 1809 to 1811, and was Speaker from 1804 to 1808. He was also a member of the Governor's Council and served as one of Vermont's presidential electors in 1820.

Leland served as Lieutenant Governor from 1822 to 1827. He declined to be nominated for Governor in 1828, preferring instead to continue serving as Pastor of his church. Though he had been a Mason, in the late 1820s Leland became active in Vermont's Antimasonic movement. He died in Chester, Vermont, on August 25, 1832, and was buried in Chester's Brookside Cemetery.

Leland was the recipient of honorary degrees from Middlebury College and Brown University.

== Sources ==
Party political offices
Preceded by William Cahoon	Democratic-Republican nominee for Lieutenant Governor of Vermont; 1822, 1823, 1824, 1825, 1826	Succeeded by Henry Olin
Political offices
Preceded by William Cahoon	Lieutenant Governor of Vermont; 1822–1827	Succeeded by Henry Olin
Preceded by Theophilus Harrington	Speaker of the Vermont House of Representatives; 1804–1804	Succeeded by Dudley Chase
