= Jackson Place =

Street in Washington DC

Coordinates: 38°53′58″N 77°02′17″W

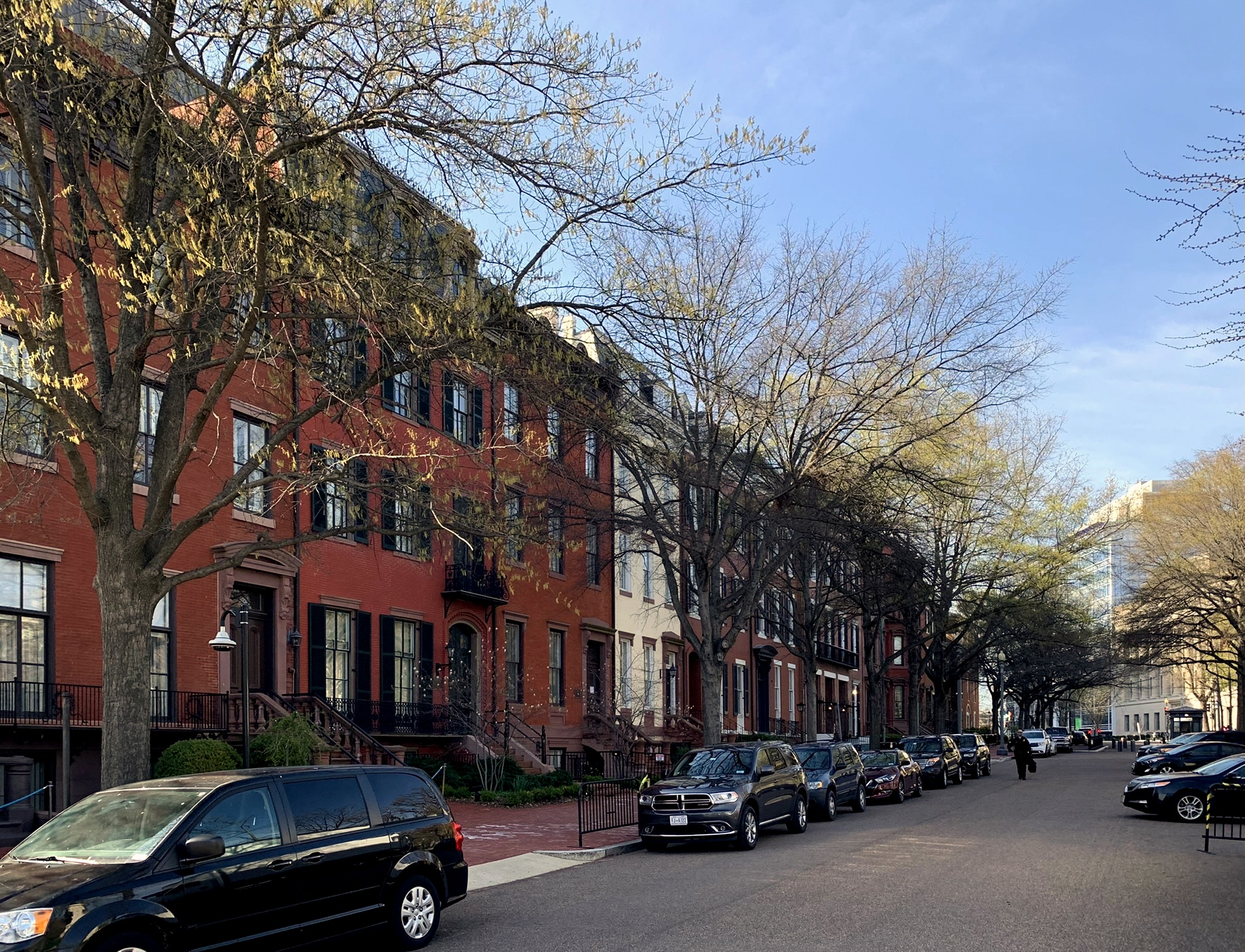
Facing north on Jackson Place

Jackson Place is a Washington, D.C. street located across from the White House and forming the western border of Lafayette Square between Pennsylvania Avenue and H Street, NW, beginning just south of Connecticut Avenue. Facing the street are mostly 19th century town homes which are now generally used for government offices or other official functions.

== History ==
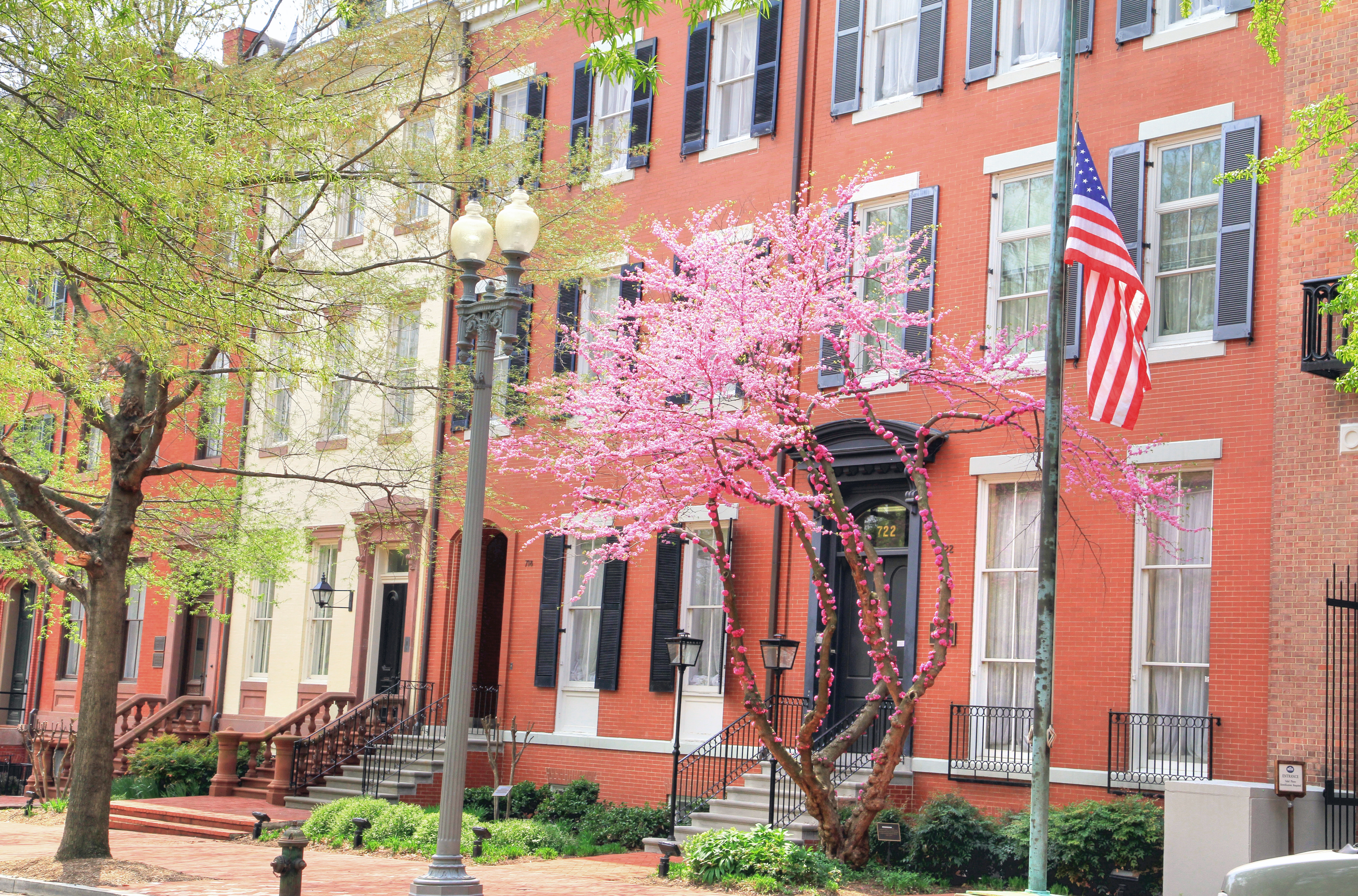
Jackson Place in Lafayette Square

The block is situated on land once owned by the Decatur family, until 1869 when they sold it to Lorenzo Sherwood, who in turn sold the land to John Knower. In 1957, the Federal government acquired the townhouses on Jackson Place. The government had plans to demolish the buildings to make way for construction of a new Federal office building on the land. In 1962, First Lady Jacqueline Kennedy intervened and the project was canceled.

== Buildings ==
The block is lined by several townhouses constructed in the late 19th century.

=== Peter Parker House ===
The Peter Parker House (700 Jackson Place), at the corner with Pennsylvania Avenue, was built in 1860. Physician Peter Parker was an early resident. It housed the Carnegie Endowment for International Peace for several decades, up until the late 1960s. In the 1980s, it was combined with Blair House.

=== 704 Jackson Place ===
704 Jackson Place was combined with Blair House in the 1980s.

=== Trowbridge House ===
708 Jackson Place was built in 1859 for William P. Trowbridge. It has been used as federal office space since the early 1900s. It is being added to the Blair House complex. In about 1951 it became the meeting place for the Psychological Strategy Board.

=== 712 Jackson Place ===
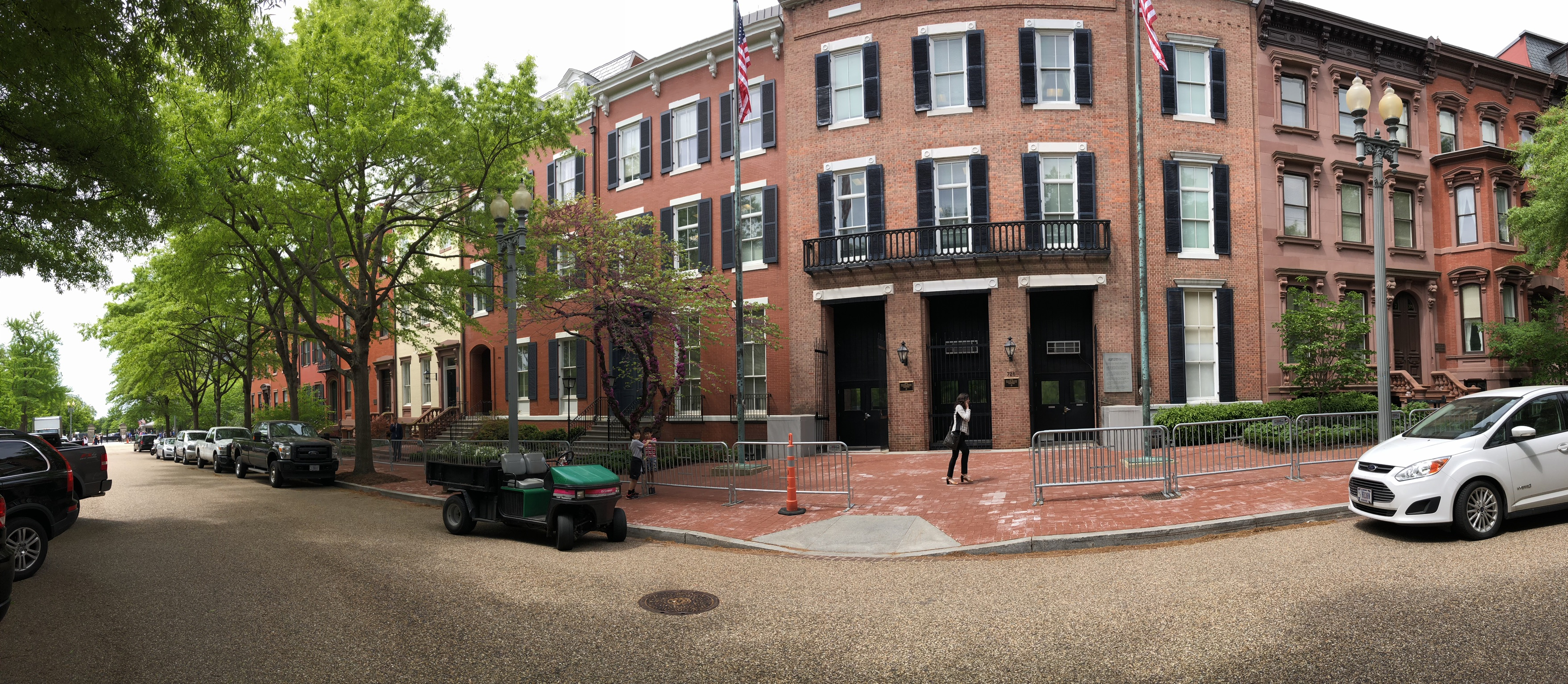
Jackson Place in 2019

712 Jackson Place was built in 1869 for Admiral James Blair, but was soon sold to Henry Rathbone. Rathbone is known for accompanying President Abraham Lincoln to Ford's Theatre on the night of the assassination. During World War I, the building was home to the Committee for Public Information, and for a brief time it housed the Women’s International League for Peace and Freedom. It is currently home to the White House Fellows program and the Harry S. Truman Scholarship Foundation.

=== 716 Jackson Place ===
The building at 716 Jackson Place is owned by the U.S. Government and is reserved for the exclusive use by former Presidents when they are in town. Purchased in the late 1950s, it became the "Presidential Townhouse" in 1969 by President Richard Nixon. The furnishings were very sparse until it was refurbished using private funds by President George W. Bush. The five-story building includes two dining rooms, multiple bedrooms, and space for a Secret Service detail in the basement.

=== 718 Jackson Place ===
718 Jackson Place NW, Washington, D.C., was the fourth and final headquarters for the Congress of Industrial Organizations (CIO), which merged with the American Federation of Labor (AFL) in 1955 to form the AFL-CIO, after originally breaking out of the AFL in 1935.

As of 2008, the federal government owns this building and houses small units attached to the Executive Office of the President.

=== 722 Jackson Place ===
The building at 722 Jackson Place was once the headquarters of the National Woman's Party (NWP) during the time of the Silent Sentinels, the first ever strategic protest of the White House, which lasted over two years asking for women's suffrage. It was the longtime home of the Council on Environmental Quality.

=== 726 Jackson Place ===
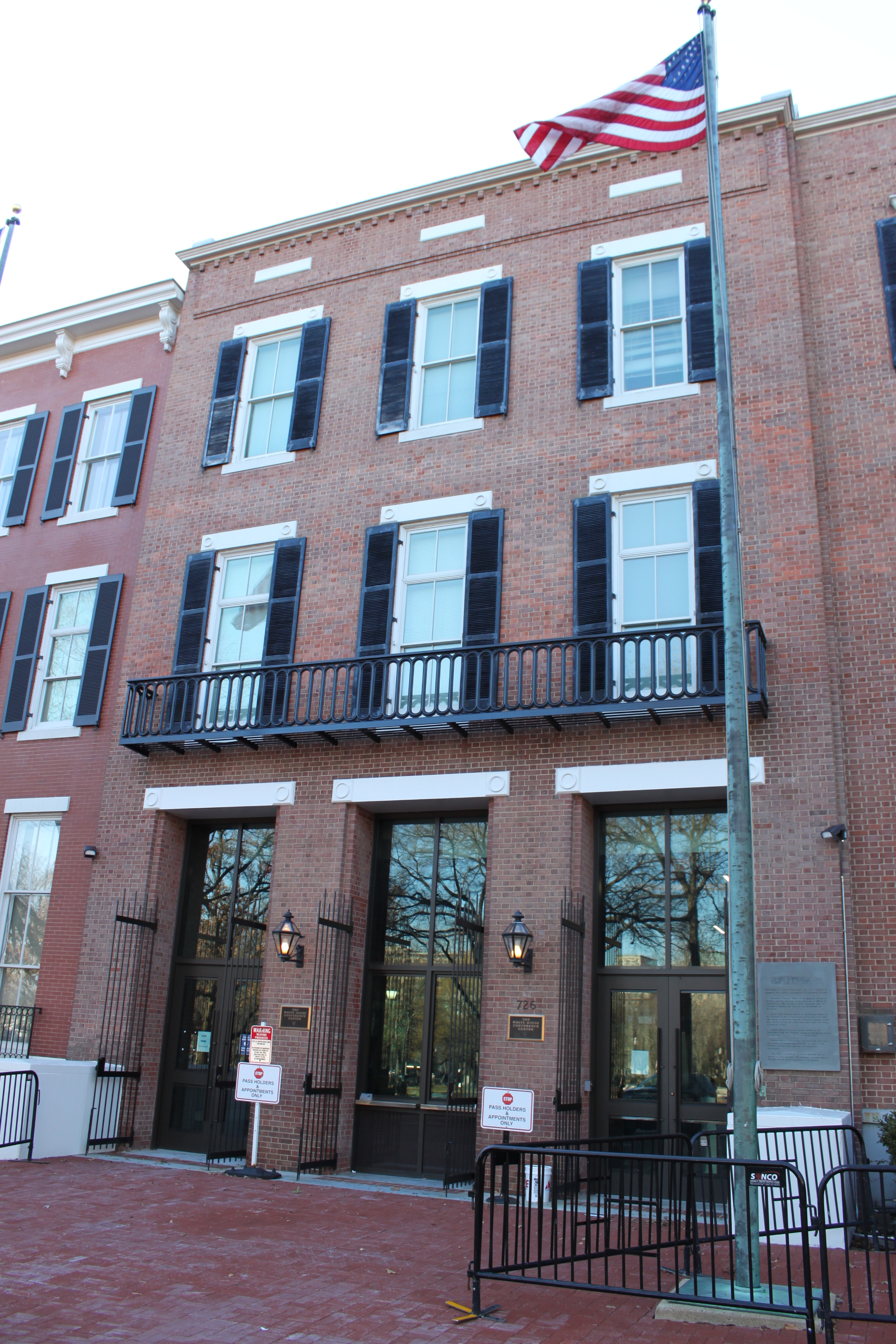
White House Conference Center, located at 726 Jackson Place, in 2022

726 Jackson Place was used as temporary White House Press Briefing Room from August 2006 to July 2007 during renovations to the James S. Brady Press Briefing Room.

=== 730 Jackson Place ===
730 Jackson Place serves as federal offices. Current tenants include the Council on Environmental Quality.

=== 734 Jackson Place ===
734 Jackson Place, a National Historic Landmark, served as the headquarters of the American Peace Society between 1911 and 1946. In the 1970s it was combined with an adjacent building to house the offices of the American Revolution Bicentennial Commission.

=== 736 Jackson Place ===
736 Jackson Place was originally built around 1870 for Cornelia Knower Marcy, the widow of Secretary of War William Learned Marcy. In the 1880s, Michigan Representative John Newberry and Senator James Blaine lived in the house. In 1887, Representative William Scott bought the house. The house was remodeled in 1895 by Carrere and Hastings.

The townhouse served as temporary quarters for President Theodore Roosevelt and his staff, while the White House underwent renovations from June 25 to November 6, 1902. Known then as No. 22 Jackson Place, Roosevelt only stayed there briefly, before heading off to Oyster Bay, New York. On October 3, 1902, Roosevelt held a meeting in the house to deal with the anthracite coal strike occurring in Pennsylvania.

The townhouse was bought in 1919 by the Women's City Club of Washington, which remained there until 1944. The house was then sold to the National Lutheran Council and the United Lutheran Church in America. Today it is nominally the headquarters of the United States DOGE Service, formerly the United States Digital Service.

=== 740–744 Jackson Place ===
740–744 Jackson Place is home to the White House Historical Association.

=== Decatur House ===
Benjamin Henry Latrobe designed the Decatur House, located at 748 Jackson Place. Completed in 1818 for naval hero Stephen Decatur and his wife, Susan, its distinguished neo-classical architecture and prominent location across from the White House made Decatur House one of the capital's most desirable addresses and home of many of the nation's most prominent figures. Later residents included Henry Clay, Martin Van Buren, and Judah P. Benjamin. The Decatur House is now owned by the National Trust for Historic Preservation and used as a museum by the White House Historical Association.

=== Ewell House ===
The Ewell House, since demolished, was built on Jackson Place in 1819 for Dr. Thomas Ewell, who was a physician in the city, and author of a popular medical book, The History of the Medical Society. For health reasons Ewell left Jackson Place and returned to a farm in Prince William County, Virginia, and subsequently leased the house. Various government officials lived in the house, including Smith Thompson (Secretary of Navy in the Monroe administration, and later Associate Justice of the Supreme Court), Samuel Southard, John Berrien (Attorney General), and Levi Woodbury (Secretary of Navy, Secretary of Treasury, and later Associate Justice of the Supreme Court), Charles Richard Vaughan (Minister of Great Britain), John C. Spencer (Secretary of War), William C. Rives (father of novelist Amélie Rives Troubetzkoy), Vice President Schuyler Colfax, and General Daniel Edgar Sickles.

== Gallery ==
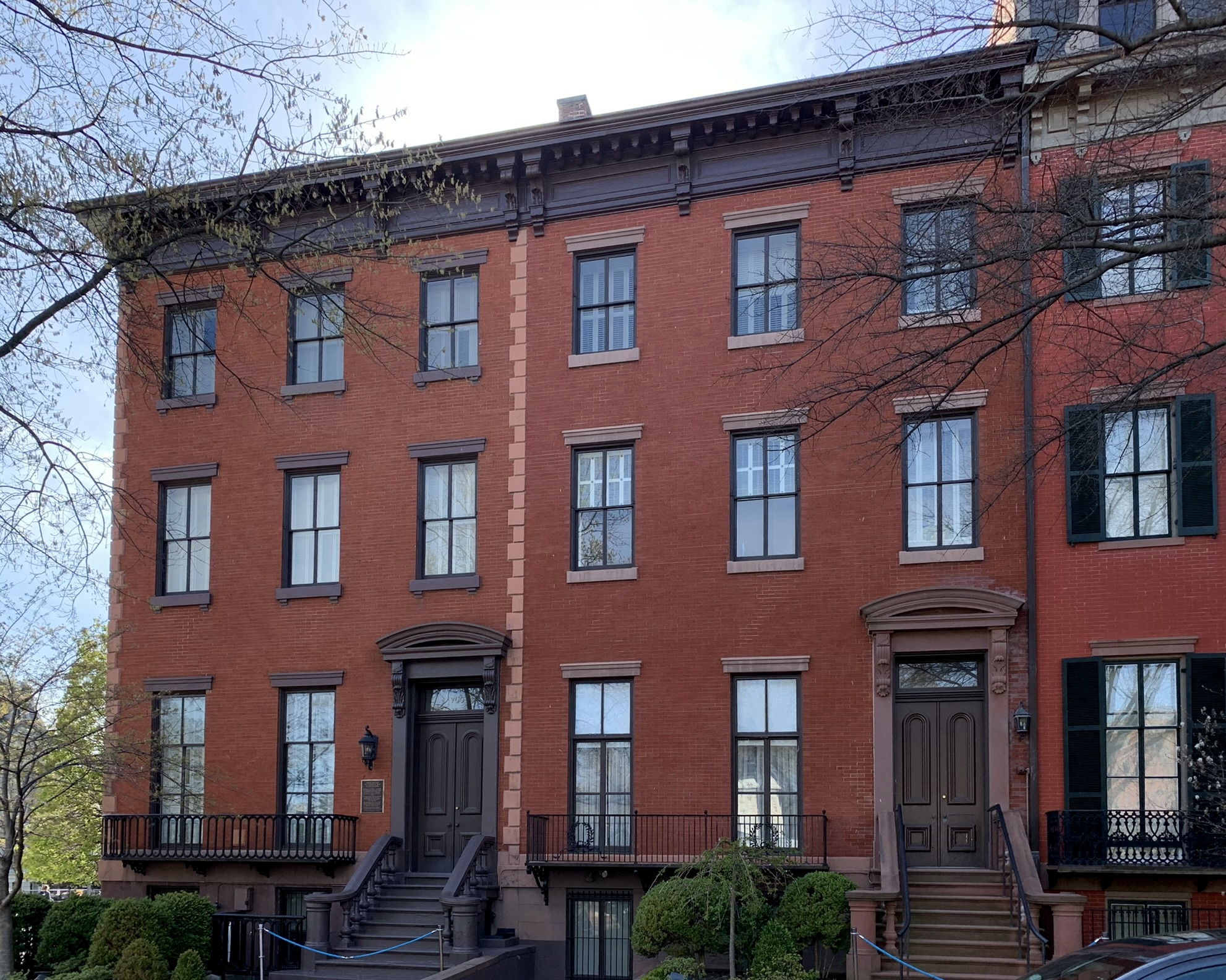
Peter Parker House, 700 Jackson Place, and adjoining 704 Jackson Place

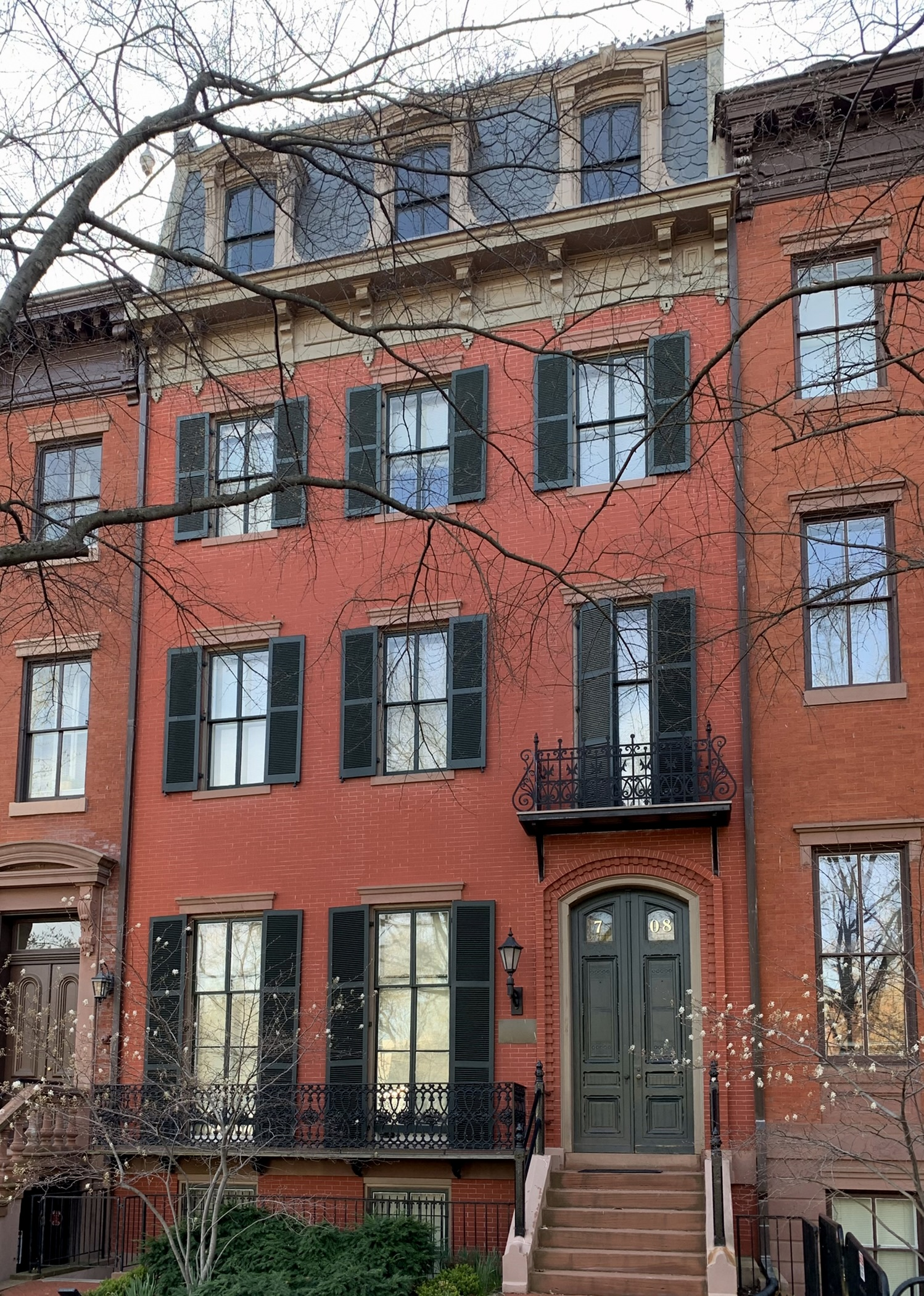
Trowbridge House, 708 Jackson Place

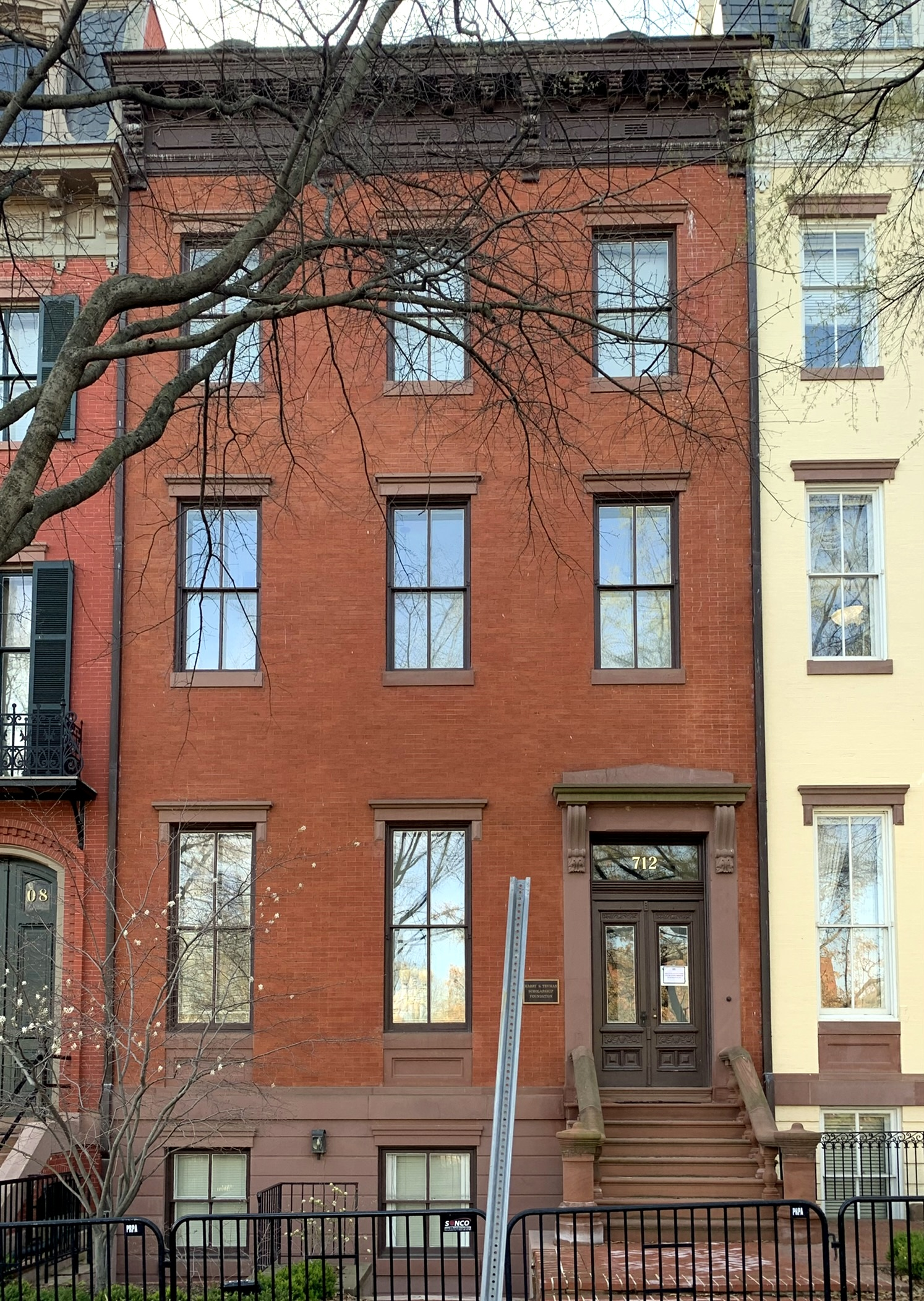
White House Fellows and the Harry S. Truman Scholarship Foundation, 712 Jackson Place

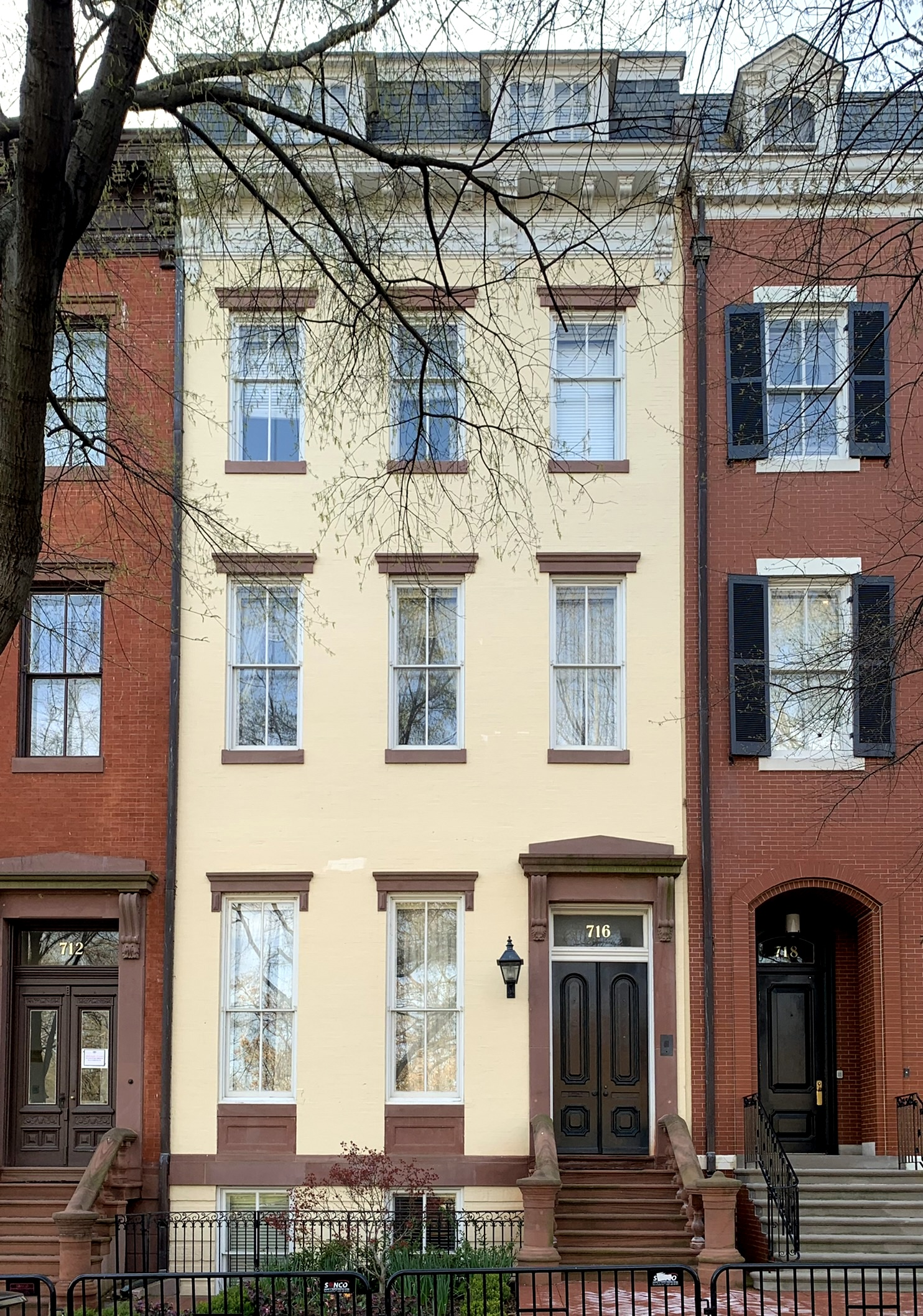
Presidential Townhouse, 716 Jackson Place

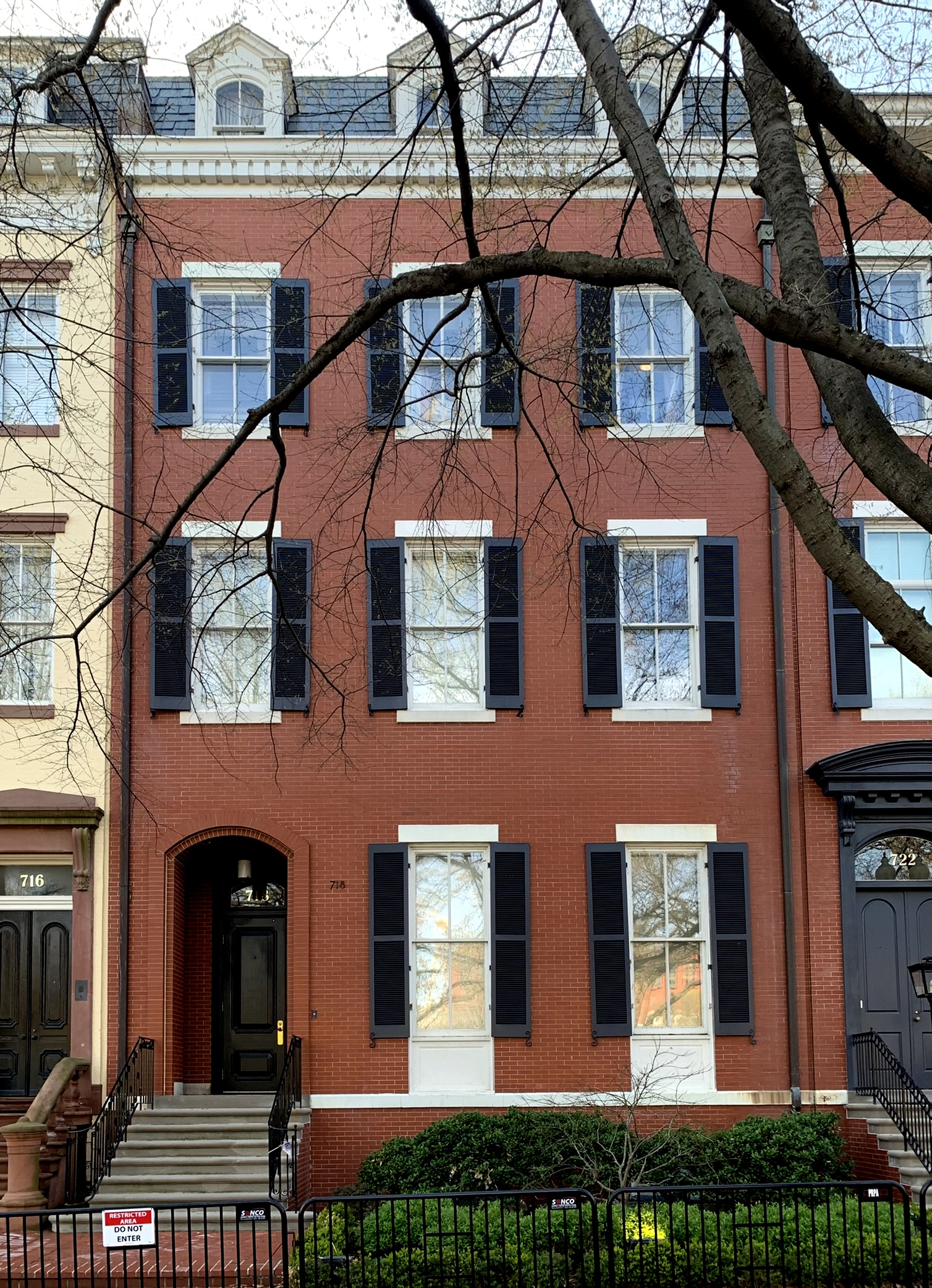
Original building demolished and replaced with historically accurate design in the 1960s, 718 Jackson Place

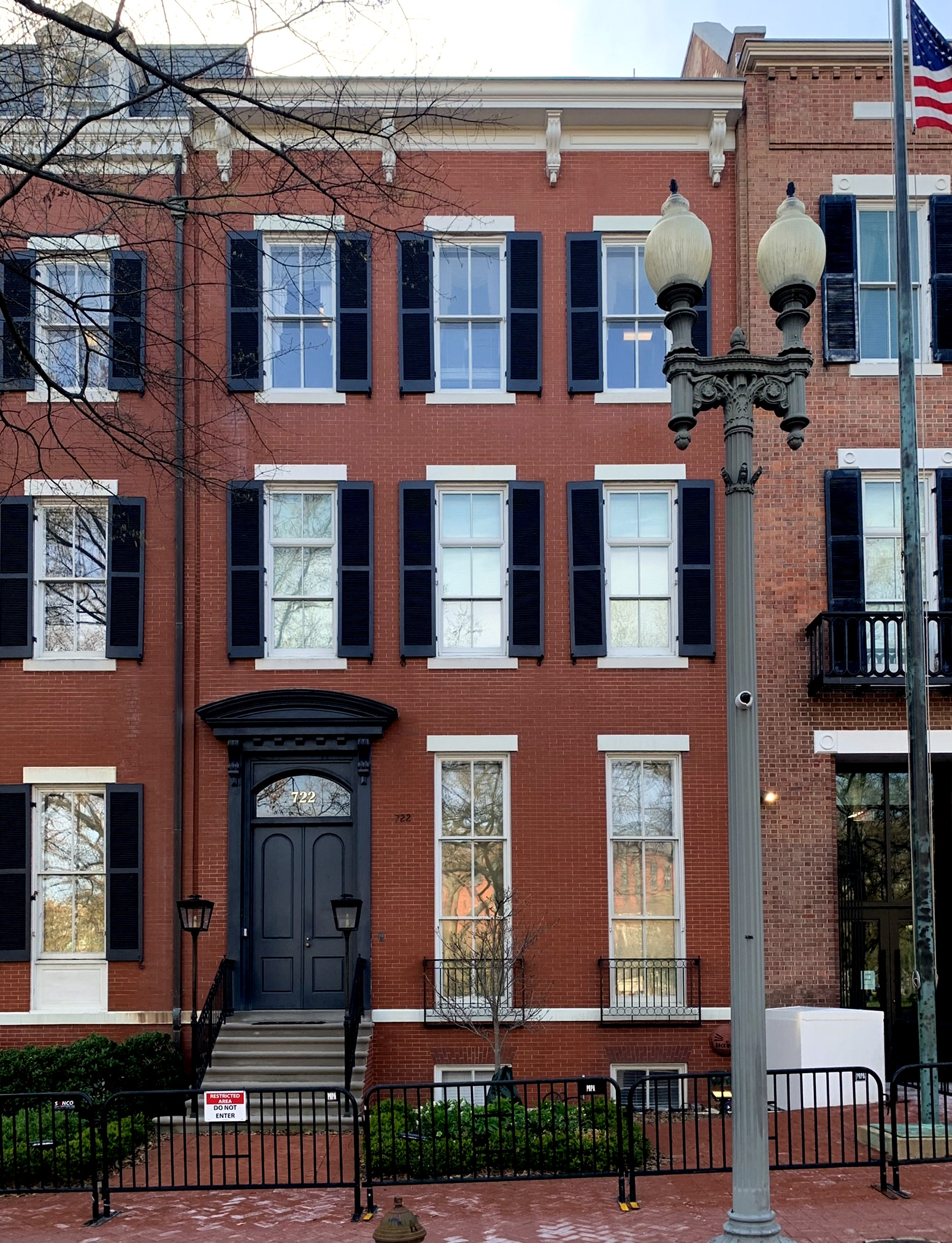
Original building demolished and replaced with historically accurate design in the 1960s, 722 Jackson Place

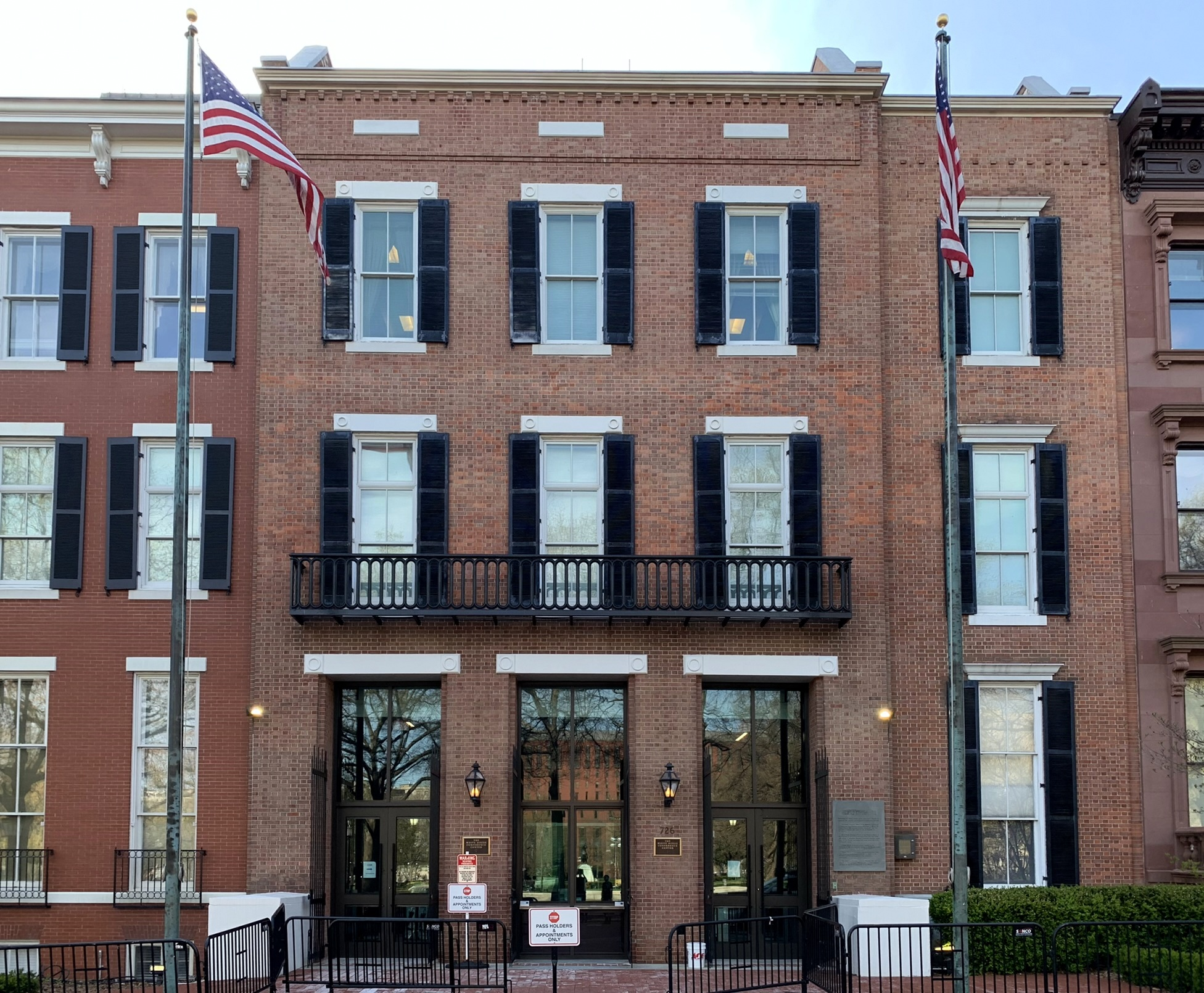
The White House Conference Center was built in the 1960s and replaced a demolished building, 722 Jackson Place

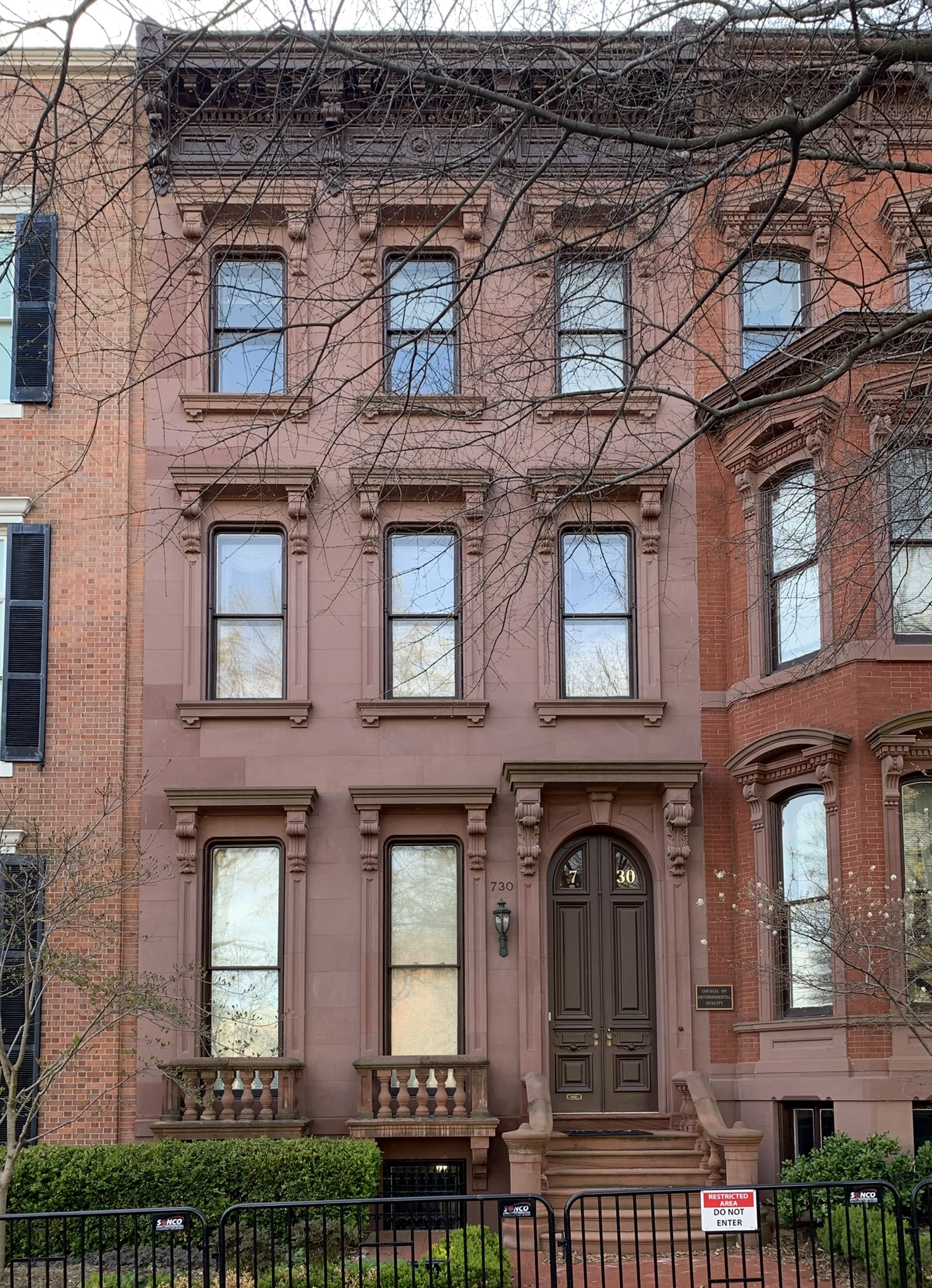
Council on Environmental Quality offices, 730 Jackson Place

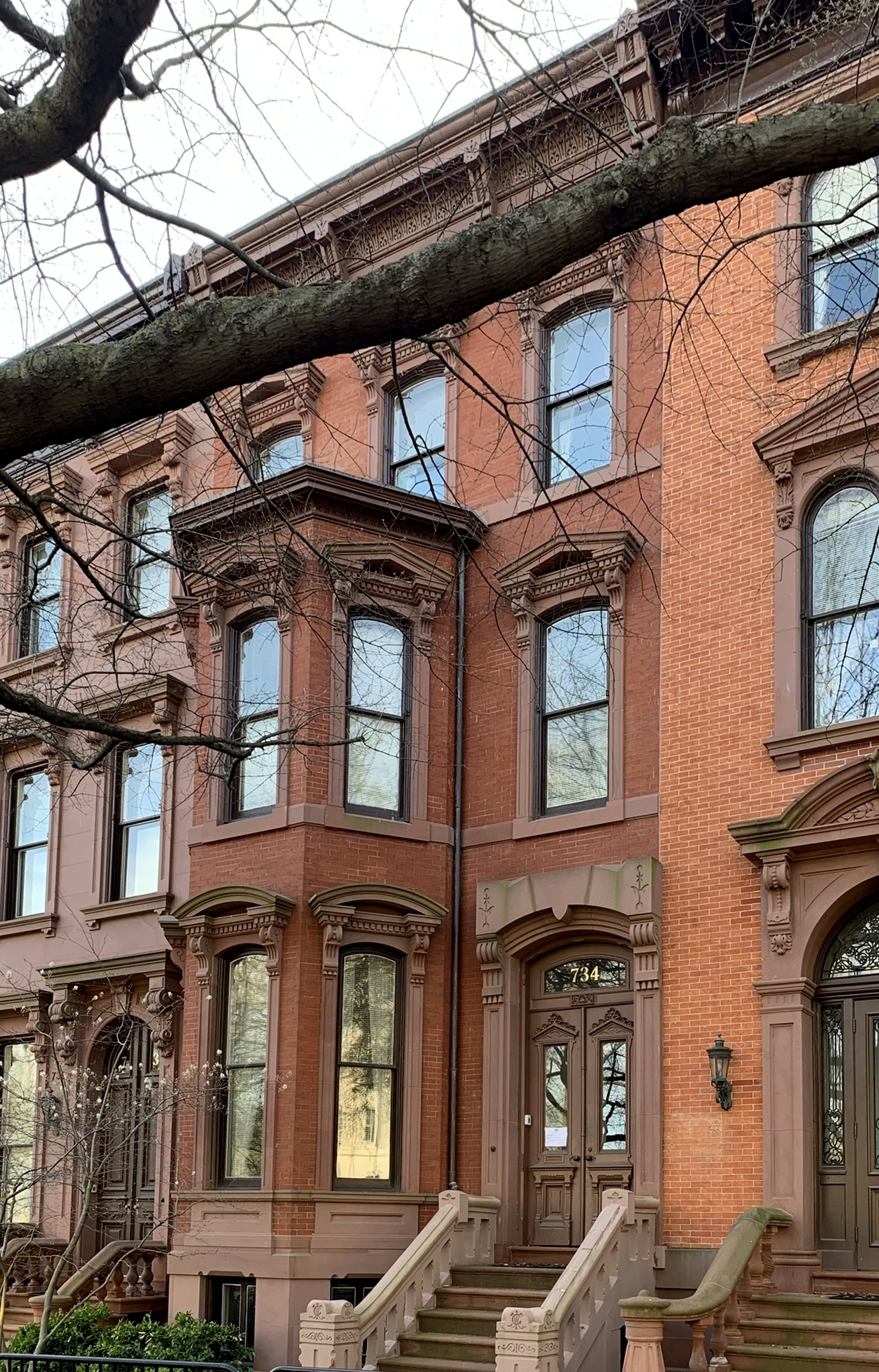
American Peace Society house, 734 Jackson Place

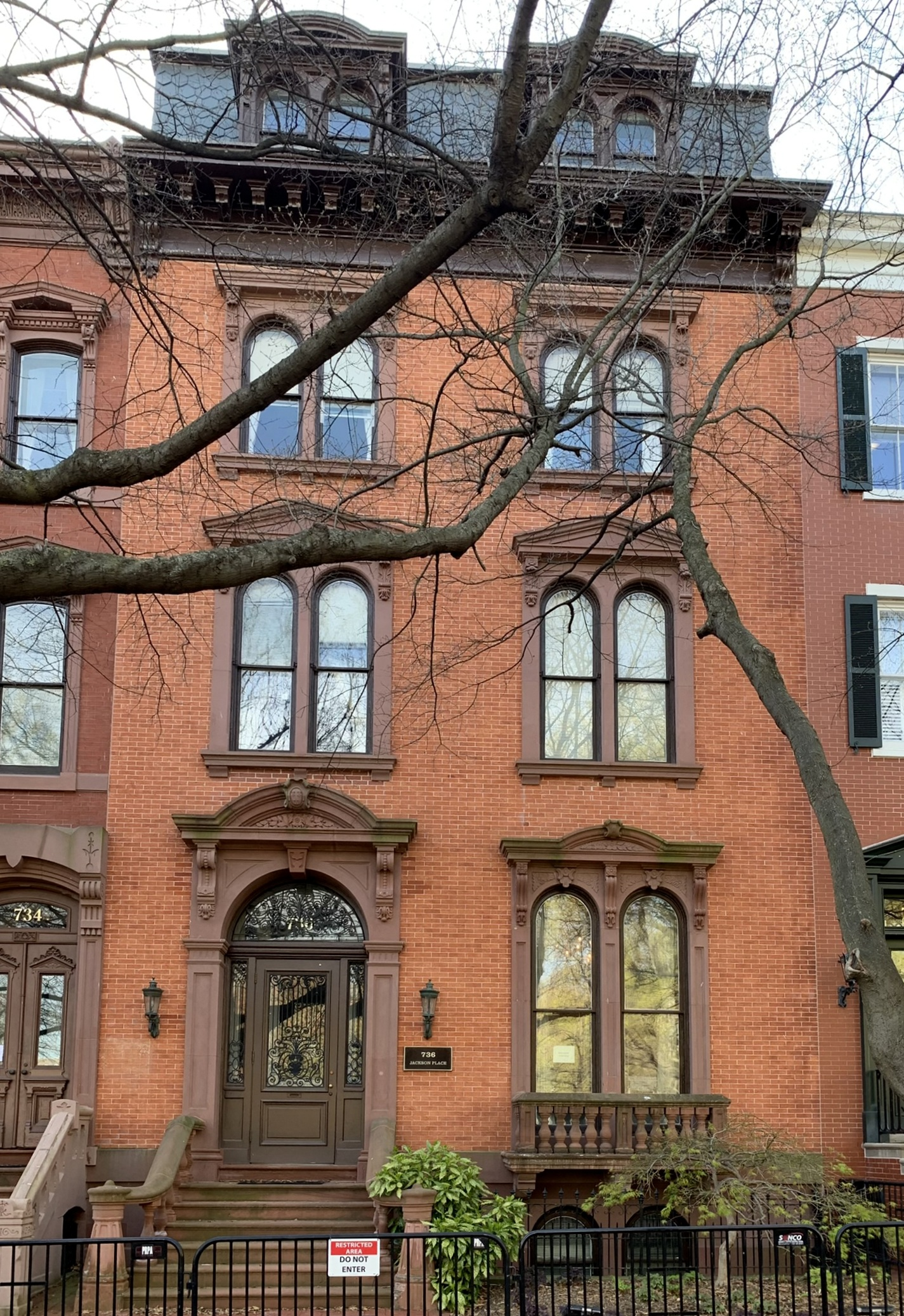
United States Digital Service offices, 736 Jackson Place

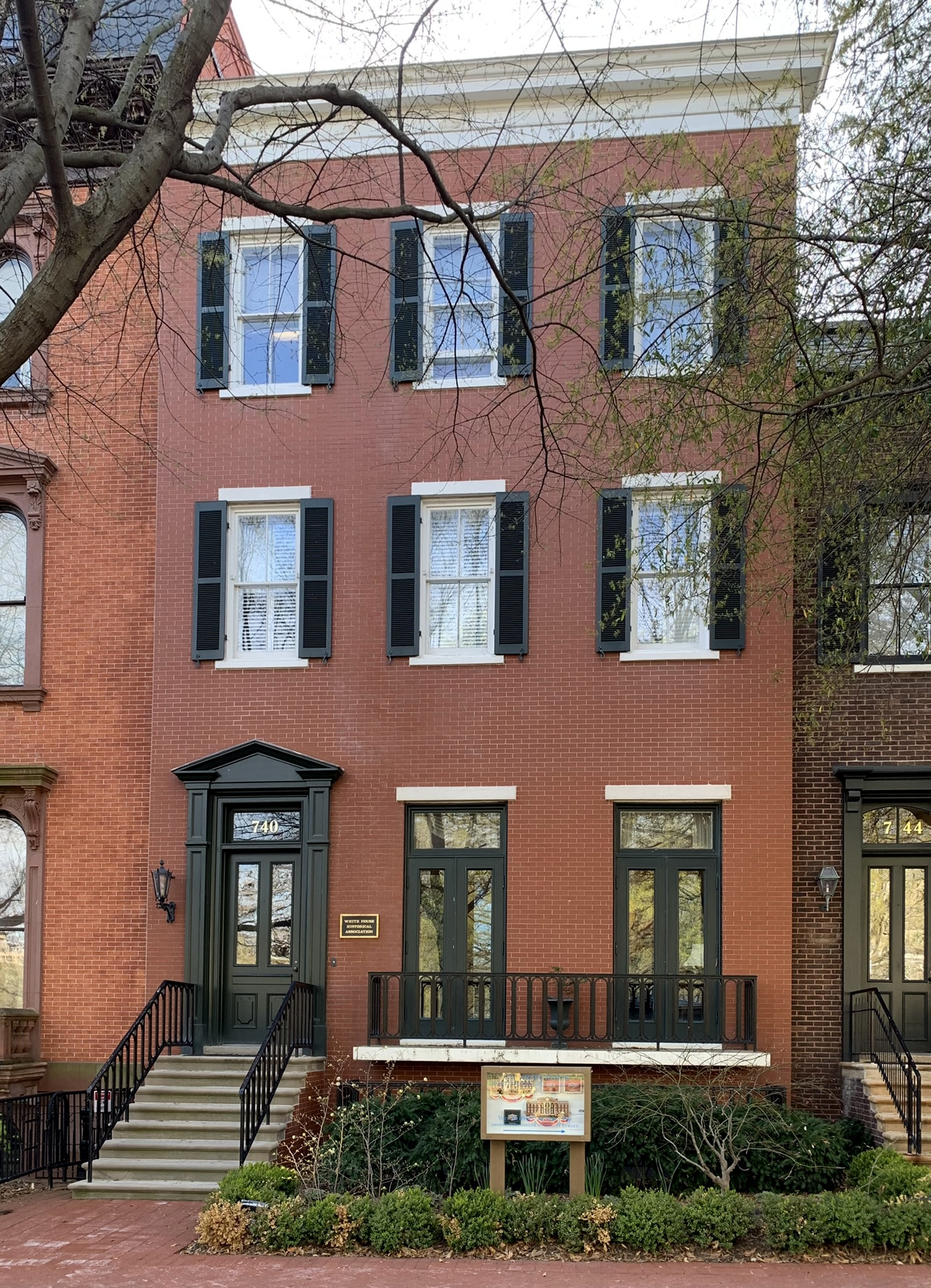
White House Historical Association offices built in the 1960s and replaced a demolished building, 740 Jackson Place

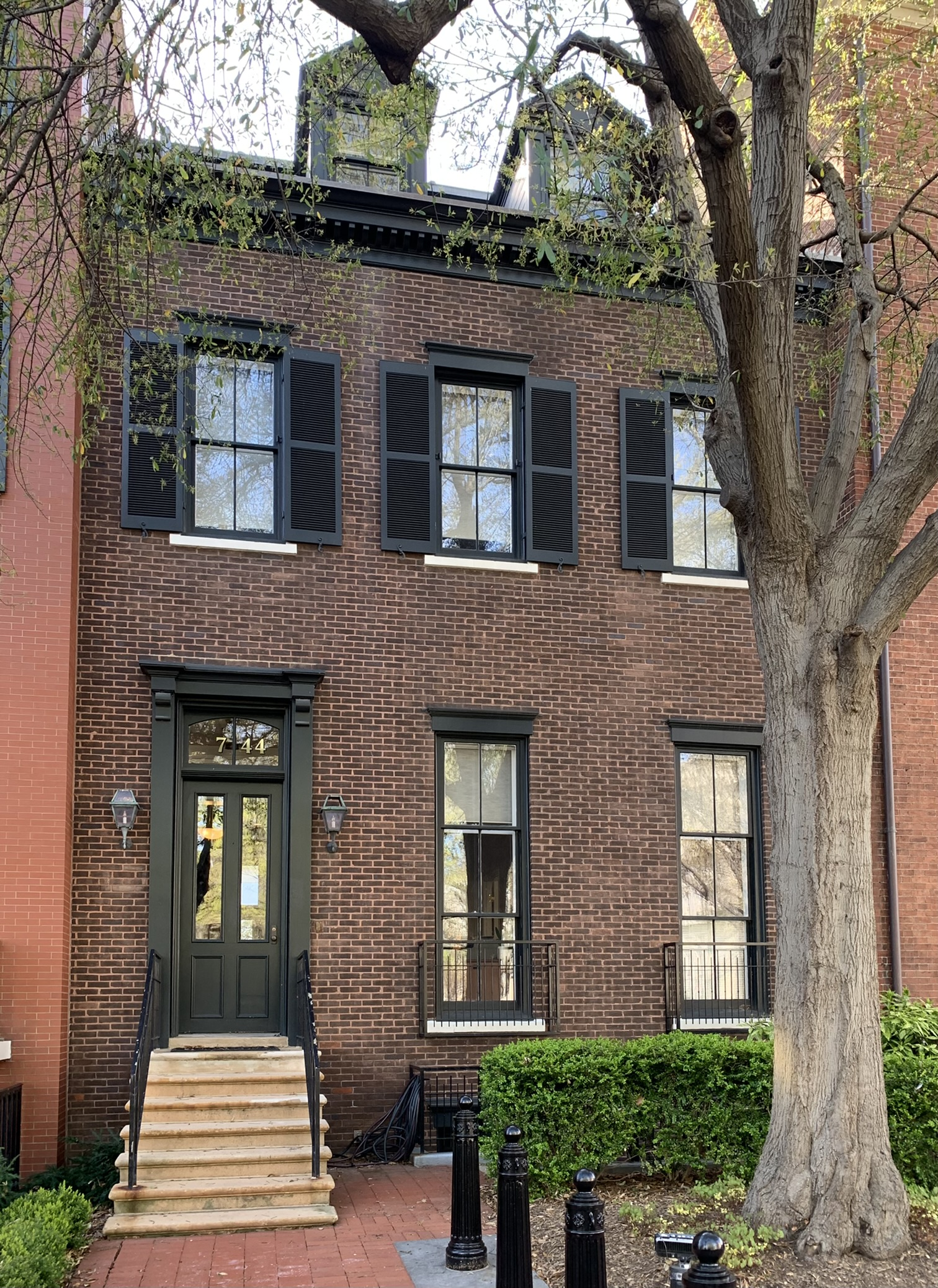
White House Historical Association offices built in the 1960s and replaced a demolished building, 744 Jackson Place

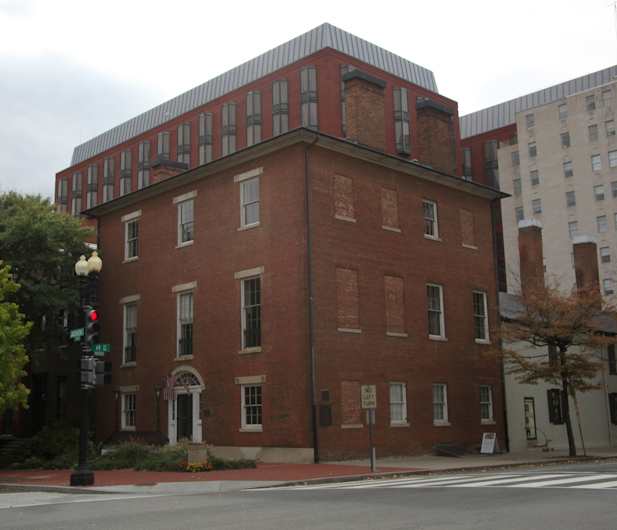
Decatur House, 748 Jackson Place
