= White House Conference Center =

State agency in USA

Coordinates: 38°53′58.3″N 77°02′17.4″W

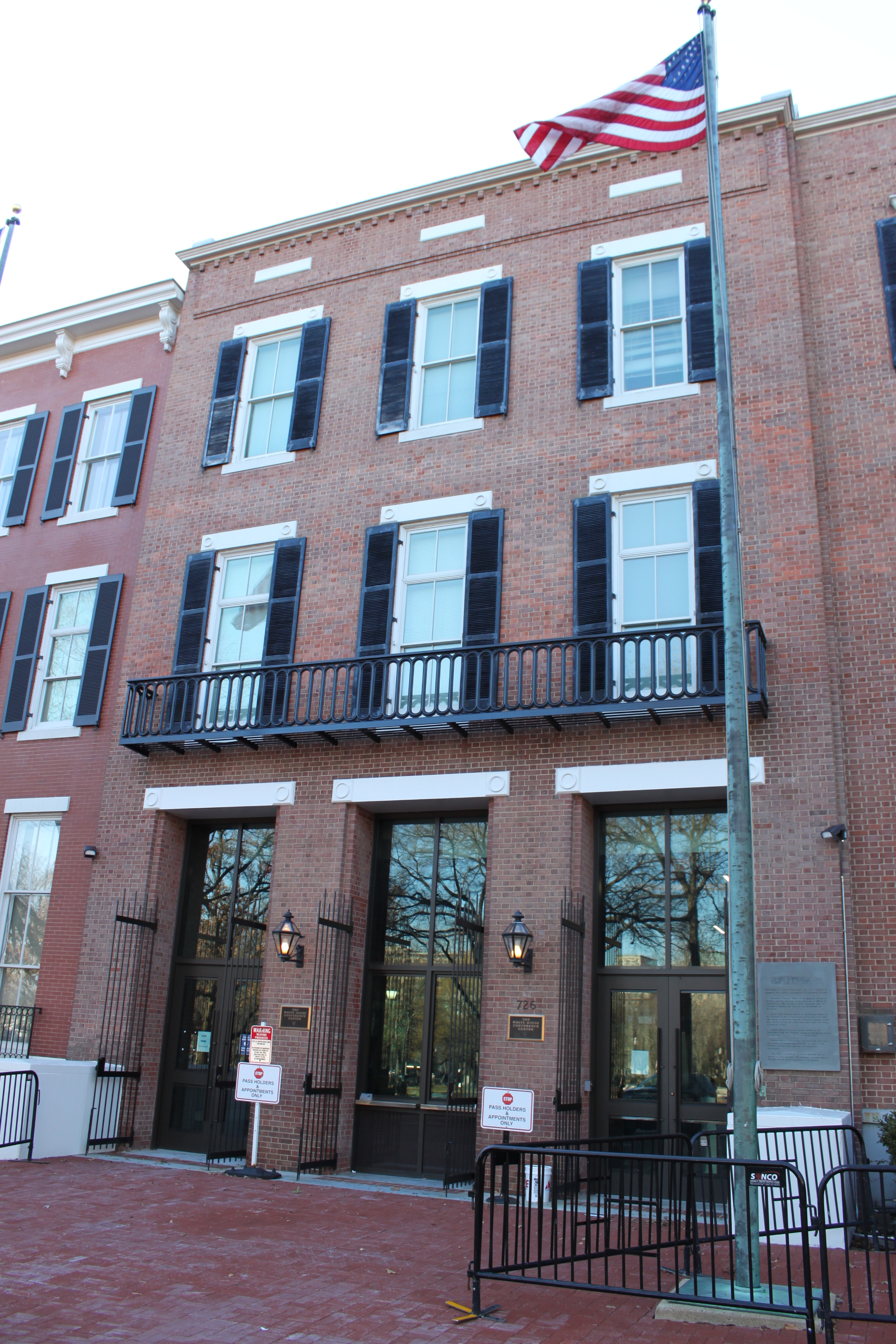
White House Conference Center on Jackson Place in 2022

The White House Conference Center is an annex building of the White House in Washington, D.C. The Colonial Revival building is located across Pennsylvania Avenue at 726 Jackson Place NW and was used as a temporary press location during remodeling of the James S. Brady Press Briefing Room from August 2006 to June 2007.

Along with 718 Jackson Place, 726 is a replica of the pre-Civil War row houses in Jackson Square built in the 20th century (late 1960s to early 1970s).

== Meeting rooms ==
- Truman Room
- Eisenhower Room
- Lincoln Room
- Jackson Room

== See also ==
- Blair House
