= Presidential Townhouse =

Quarters in Washington, DC for former US Presidents

Coordinates: 38°53′57.4″N 77°02′17.3″W

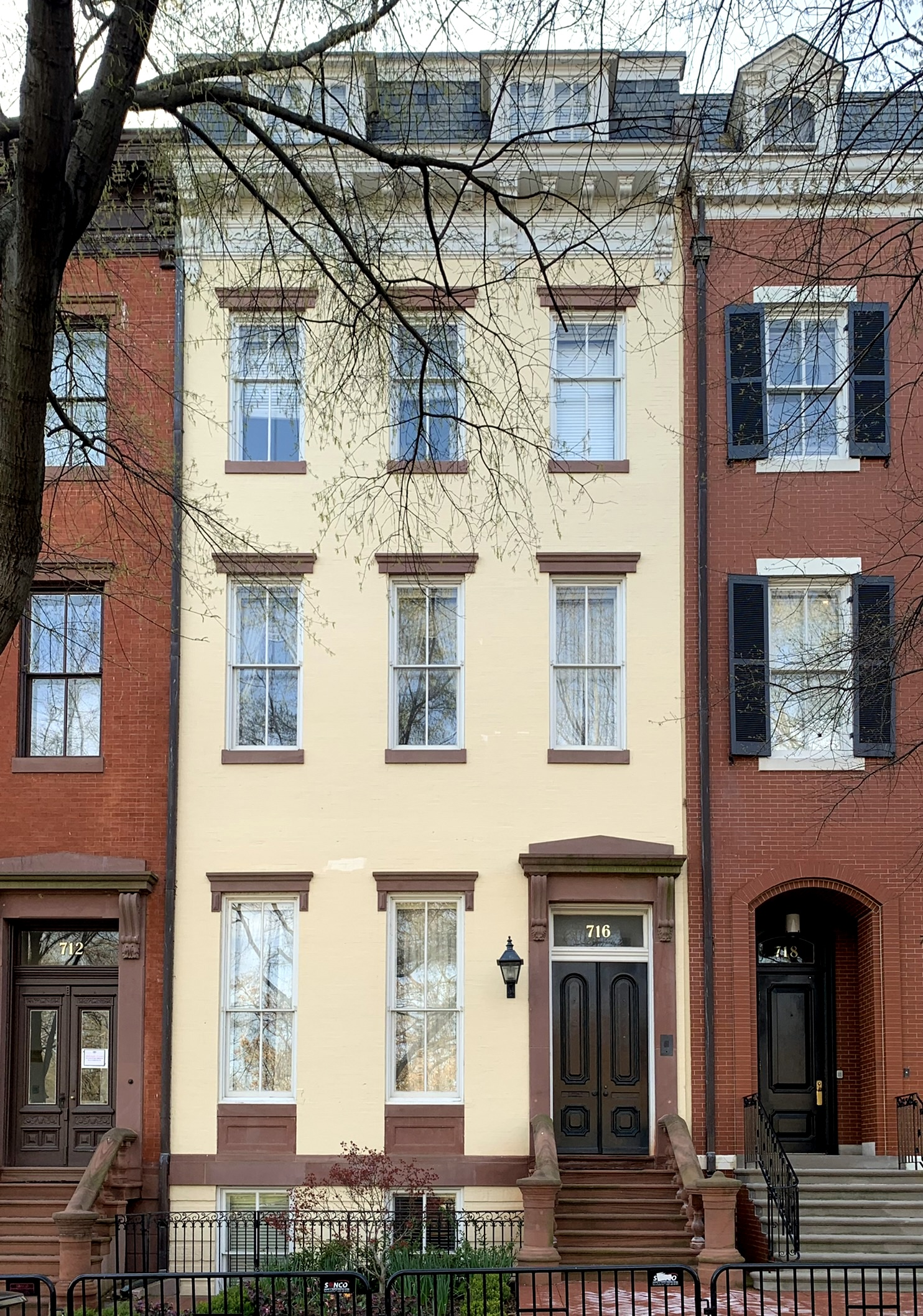
716 Jackson Place

The Presidential Townhouse is a U.S. government-owned building managed by the General Services Administration. It is located at 716 Jackson Place NW in Washington, D.C., on the western side of Lafayette Square. For ease of providing security, it was reserved for the exclusive use of former presidents of the United States during visits to the capital from 1969 to 2015, when that function was moved to Trowbridge House. Located across Pennsylvania Avenue from the White House, it adjoins several other government-owned townhouses used for official purposes, including Blair House, often used by visiting heads of state, and is now used by the Executive Office of the President.

== Description ==
The townhouse is four stories, and has brown sandstone steps. During its time as a guesthouse for former presidents, it had two dining rooms, several bedrooms, and space for a Secret Service detail in the basement.

== History ==
The townhouse was constructed in the late 1860s. It was once the home of Supreme Court justice Oliver Wendell Holmes Jr.

Purchased by the government in the late 1950s and used for various purposes, the Presidential Townhouse was established in 1969 by order of President Richard Nixon. The furnishings were very sparse until it was refurbished using private funds during the administration of President George W. Bush (2001–2009). During its use as a residence for former presidents, its maintenance was funded through the Former Presidents Act, which provides for office support and Secret Service protection of former presidents.

In 2015, the function of a presidential guest house was relocated a few doors south to Trowbridge House at 708 Jackson Place, NW.

In 2021, the Office of the National Cyber Director began using the house.
