= Former Presidents Act =

1958 U.S. law providing benefits to former presidents of the United States

The Former Presidents Act (known also as FPA; 3 U.S.C. § 102 note (P.L. 85-745)) is a 1958 U.S. federal law that provides several lifetime benefits to former presidents of the United States who have not been removed from office solely pursuant to Article Two of the United States Constitution.

== History ==
Before 1958, the U.S. federal government provided no pension or other retirement benefits to former United States presidents. Andrew Carnegie offered to endow a US$25,000 (equal to $834,052 today) annual pension for former chief executives in 1912, but congressmen questioned the propriety of such a private pension. That prompted legislation to provide benefits to former presidents. Although legislation was first introduced later that year to provide any such benefits, that legislation was not enacted.

When the Former Presidents Act took effect in 1958, there were two living former presidents: Herbert Hoover and Harry S. Truman. Dwight D. Eisenhower was the first president to fall under the act upon leaving office.

The original act provided for lifetime Secret Service protection for former presidents. In 1994, protection was reduced to ten years after leaving office for presidents inaugurated after January 1, 1997. This protection limitation was reversed in early 2013 by the Former Presidents Protection Act of 2012.

All living former presidents and their spouses after Dwight D. Eisenhower are now entitled to receive lifetime Secret Service protection. Their children are entitled to protection "until they become 16 years of age".

== Benefits ==
By law, former presidents are entitled to a pension, staff, office expenses, medical care, health insurance, and Secret Service protection.

=== Pension ===
The secretary of the Treasury pays a taxable pension to the president. Former presidents receive a pension equal to the salary of a Cabinet secretary (Executive Level I); as of 2020, it was $219,200 per year and since January 2022, $226,300. The pension begins immediately after a president's departure from office. A former president's spouse may also be paid a lifetime annual pension of $20,000 if they relinquish any other statutory pension.

=== Transition ===
Transition funding for the expenses of leaving office is available for seven months. It covers office space, staff compensation, communications services, and printing and postage associated with the transition.

=== Staff and office ===
Private office staff and related funding is provided by the administrator of the General Services Administration. People employed under this subsection are selected by and responsible only to the former president for the performance of their duties. Each former president fixes basic rates of compensation for persons employed for them, not exceeding an annualized total of $150,000 for the first 30 months and $96,000 thereafter.

=== Medical insurance ===
Former presidents are entitled to medical treatment in military hospitals; they pay for this at rates set by the Office of Management and Budget. Presidents may buy health insurance under the Federal Employees Health Benefits Program.

=== Secret Service protection ===
From 1965 to 1996, former presidents were entitled to lifetime Secret Service protection, for themselves, spouses, and children under 16. A 1994 statute, Pub. L. 103–329, limited post-presidential protection to ten years for presidents inaugurated after January 1, 1997. Under this statute, Bill Clinton would still be entitled to lifetime protection, and all subsequent presidents would have been entitled to ten years of protection. On January 10, 2013, President Barack Obama signed the Former Presidents Protection Act of 2012, reinstating lifetime Secret Service protection for his predecessor George W. Bush, himself, and all subsequent presidents.

Richard Nixon relinquished his Secret Service protection in 1985, the only president to do so.

== See also ==
- Presidential Townhouse
