= Trowbridge House =

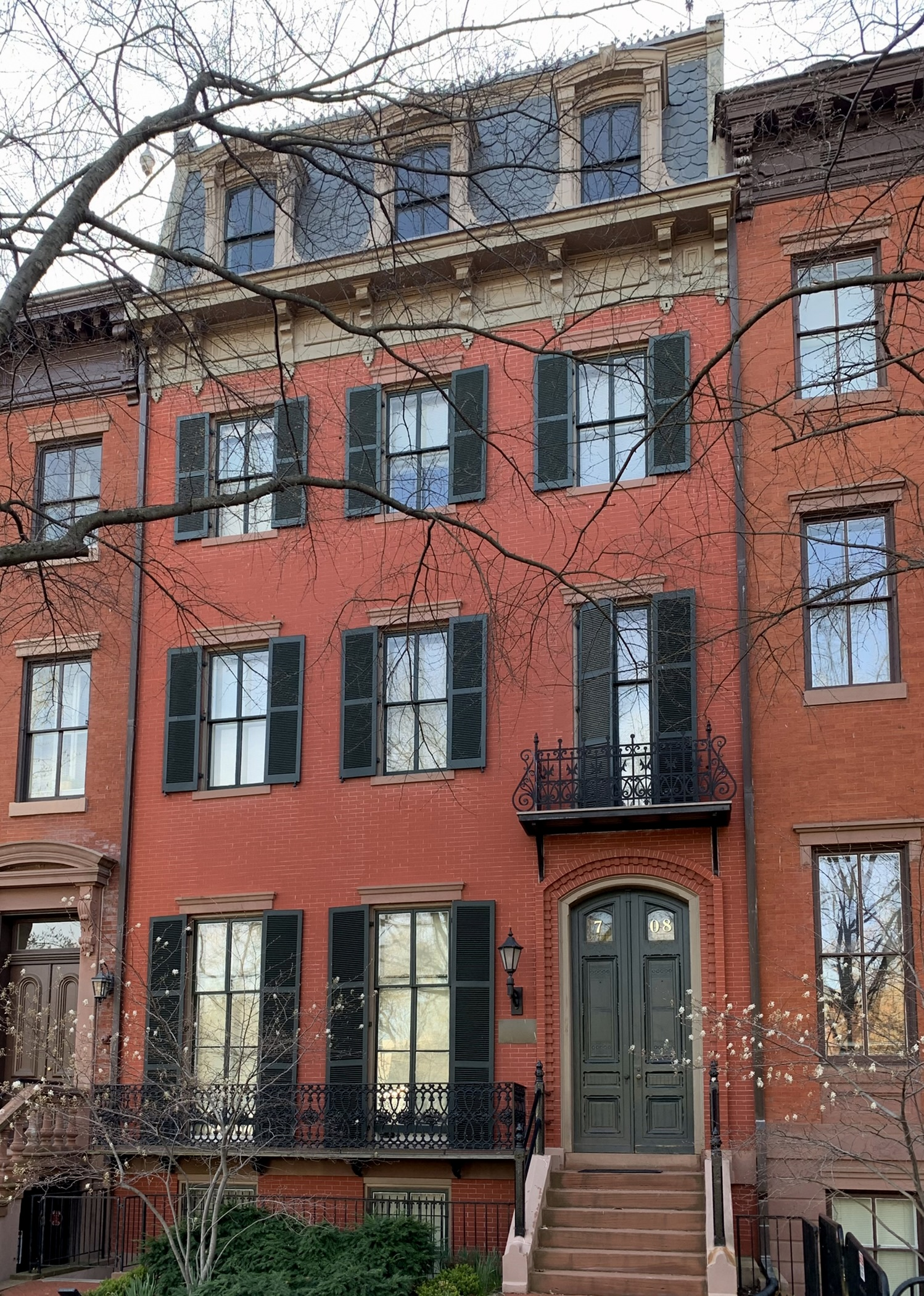
- Trowbridge House in 2022

General information
- Type: Official residence
- Architectural style: Italianate
- Location: 708 Jackson Place NW, Washington, DC, United States
- Coordinates: 38°53′56.9″N 77°2′17.3″W
- Completed: 1859
- Owner: United States
- Landlord: General Services Administration

The Trowbridge House is a historic building located in Washington, D.C., that as of 2015 was renovated to serve as a presidential residence, specifically for the use of former presidents of the United States while visiting the capital city. It replaced the Presidential Townhouse at 716 Jackson Place as a guest residential facility for use by former presidents.

Constructed in 1859 as the residence of William P. Trowbridge, Trowbridge sold the house in 1869, and in the early 20th century, it was leased by the United States government for use as office space. The government ultimately purchased the building in 1950 and over the following decades, it housed the offices of the Commission of Fine Arts and, from 1989 to 1993, The President’s Drug Advisory Council. Later, the White House Millennium Council, Psychological Strategy Board, Operations Coordinating Board, White House Office of Women's Initiatives and Outreach, and White House Office of Faith-Based and Community Initiatives.

Trowbridge House abuts the back of the President's Guest House (Blair House) on its north side and next door to 712 Jackson Place, which houses the Harry S. Truman Scholarship Foundation, on the north.

== See also ==
- Camp David
- White House
