= William P. Trowbridge =

American engineer (1828–1892)

General William P. Trowbridge
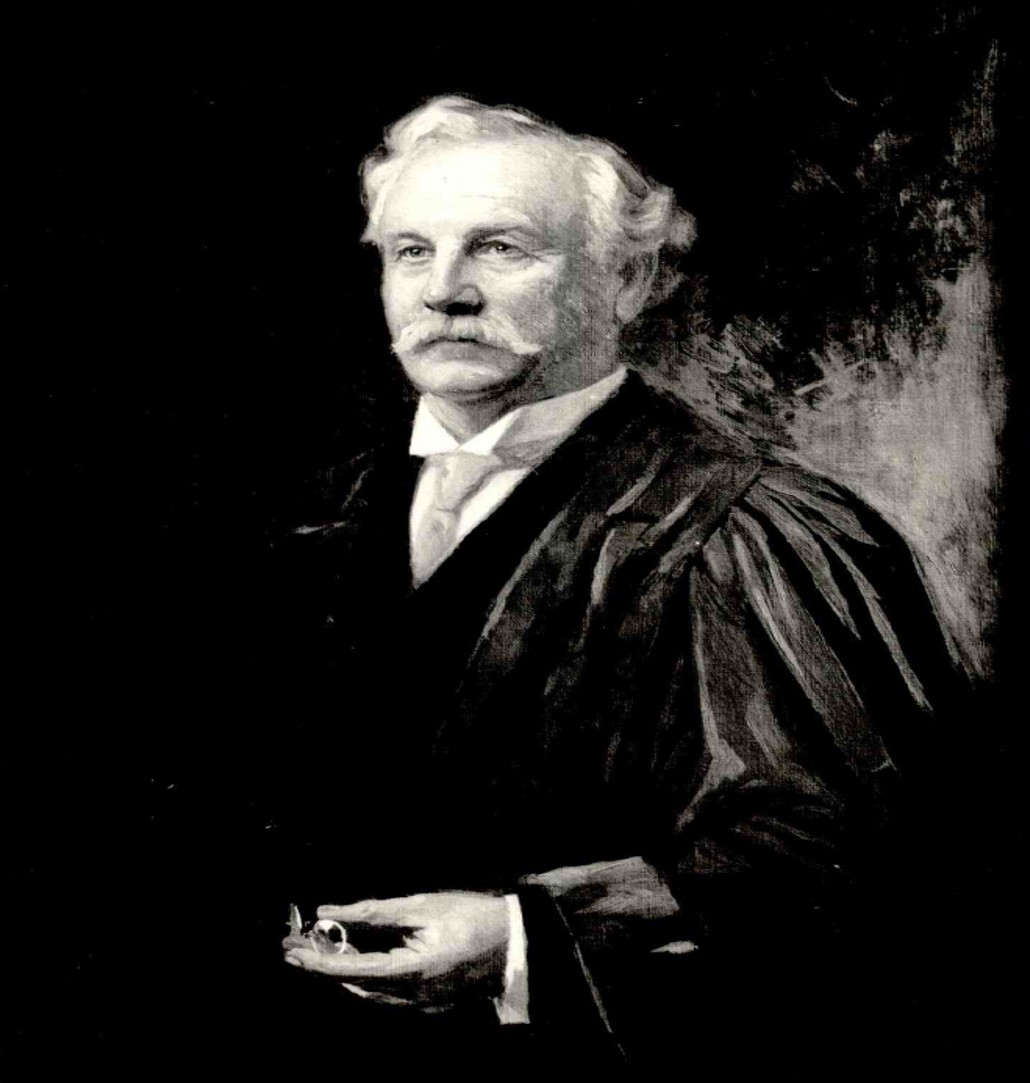
- Born: William Petit Trowbridge; May 25, 1828; Troy, MI
- Died: August 12, 1892 (aged 64); New Haven, CT
- Burial place: Evergreen Cemetery
- Monuments: Trowbridge House
- Education: United States Military Academy; University of Rochester; Yale College, Princeton College; Trinity College; University of Michigan
- Occupations: Military officer, mechanical engineer, professor
- Employers: University of Michigan; Sheffield Scientific School; Columbia School of Mines
- Spouse: Lucy Parkman (1857–1892)
- Children: 8
- Awards: Member, National Academy of Sciences (1872)
- Military career
- Allegiance: United States
- Branch: United States Army
- Service years: 1852–56, 1861–65, 1872–76
- Rank: Major general
- Commands: Connecticut State Militia

William Petit Trowbridge (May 25, 1828 – August 12, 1892) was a mechanical engineer, military officer, and naturalist. He was one of the first mechanical engineers on the faculties of the University of Michigan, the Sheffield Scientific School of Yale, and the Columbia School of Mines. He had a brief military career after graduating from West Point and later served as Adjutant General for the State of Connecticut from 1873 to 1876. During his career as a surveyor on the American Pacific coast he collected thousands of animal specimens, several of which now bear his name.

Trowbridge inducted into the National Academy of Sciences in 1872 and was also a member of the New York Academy of Sciences. Also in 1872, he was elected to the American Philosophical Society.

== Early life and family ==
William Petit Trowbridge was born in the Strawberry Hill subdivision of Troy, Michigan, on May 25, 1828. His parents were Stephan Van Rennselaer Trowbridge (1794–1859) and Elizabeth Conkling (1797–1873). Stephan fought in the War of 1812 and William's grandfather took part in the Battle of Lexington as a brevet Captain in the Continental Army.

Trowbridge had eleven siblings, many of whom became notable in their own right. An older brother, Rowland Ebenezer (1828–1881), became a United States Congressman from Michigan and a close friend of Rutherford B. Hayes, and two others became Michigan businessmen. One younger brother, Tillman Conkling (1831–1888), became a Christian missionary in Aintab, Turkey and a founder of Central Turkey College, and another, Luther Stephen (1836–1912), also became a major general during the American Civil War.

== Military education and survey career ==
Trowbridge was appointed as a cadet to the United States Military Academy at West Point at the age of sixteen. He graduated at the head of his class in 1848, serving in the last year of his cadetship as acting assistant professor of chemistry. Soon after graduation, he was ordered back to West Point as an assistant in the astronomical observatory, where he prepared himself for duty at the United States Coast Survey. As a surveyor, he completed studies the Maine coast and of navigation improvements for the Appomattox River and James River in Virginia. He was promoted to the rank of first lieutenant on December 18, 1854, in the Corps of Engineers.

=== Specimen collection and discoveries ===
From 1853 to 1856, Trowbridge headed a magnetic, tidal, and astronomical survey of the full length American Pacific coast and participated in Lt. Robert Williamson's Pacific Railroad Survey. During this time, Trowbridge's assembled an animal specimen collection that added "some fifty new fishes alone to the North American fauna," according to a report prepared in 1854 by ichthyologist and Smithsonian Institution Assistant Secretary Spencer Baird. Also in 1854, Charles Girard presented a paper, "Observations upon a collection of fishes made on the Pacific coast of the United States by Lieutenant W.P. Trowbridge, for the museum of the Smithsonian Institution." A larger collection of several thousand animal specimens was donated to the University of Michigan in 1859, the largest early gift to the university's zoology collection.

Two Pacific coast fishes are named after Trowbridge. They are the surf-perch Helconotus trowbridgii (Girard, 1854) and the whiting Homalopomus trowbridgii, (Girard, 1856). The first specimen of Trowbridge's shrew was collected on June 10, 1855, by Trowbridge at Astoria, Oregon.

== Civilian and academic career ==
William resigned his commission in the U.S. Army on December 1, 1856, to accept a professorship of mathematics at the University of Michigan. A year later, he returned to the U.S. Coast Survey as a civilian scientific adviser, where he was employed on Gulf Stream observations and in magnetic work at Key West, Florida. From 1862 to 1865, during the Civil War, he was in charge of the engineer agency in New York City and oversaw the construction of the fort at Willets Point as well as repairs to New York Harbor.

After the war, he was vice-president of the Novelty Iron Works in New York City until 1871, when he returned to academia as first mechanical engineering professor at Yale, where he took the post of Professor of Dynamical Engineering in the Sheffield Scientific School. While at Yale, he served the State of Connecticut as Adjutant General from 1872 to 1876, commissioner of the building of the Connecticut State Capitol and as commissioner for establishing harbor lines at New Haven. In 1877 he accepted a position as chair of the engineering department at the School of Mines at Columbia College, where he remained until his death in 1892. While serving at Columbia College, Professor Trowbridge took charge of the Tenth Census of the department of power and machinery employed in manufactures.

He was associate editor with Johnson’s Universal Cyclopaedia and author of “Heat and Heat-Engines” (1874) as well as numerous contributions to the Academy of Sciences of New York. The degree of A.M. was conferred upon him by University of Rochester in 1856 and by Yale in 1870. He was awarded a Ph.D. by Princeton College in 1880 and an LL.D. by Trinity College in 1883 and by the University of Michigan in 1887. He was a member of the New York Academy of Sciences, the American Association for the Advancement of Science and was elected a member of the National Academy in 1872.

== Personal life ==
Trowbridge married Miss Lucy Parkman in Savannah, Georgia, on April 21, 1857, and together they had five sons and three daughters; Catherine Helsey (1858), Lucy Parkman (1859), William Petit (1861), Samuel Breck Parkman (1862), Nannie Bernie (1864), Percival Elliot (1867), Julian Percival (1869) and Charles Christopher (1870). Samuel went on to become an architect in the New York-based practice of Trowbridge & Livingston.

Trowbridge died on August 12, 1892, in New Haven, Connecticut, and was buried at Evergreen Cemetery.

== Architectural legacy ==
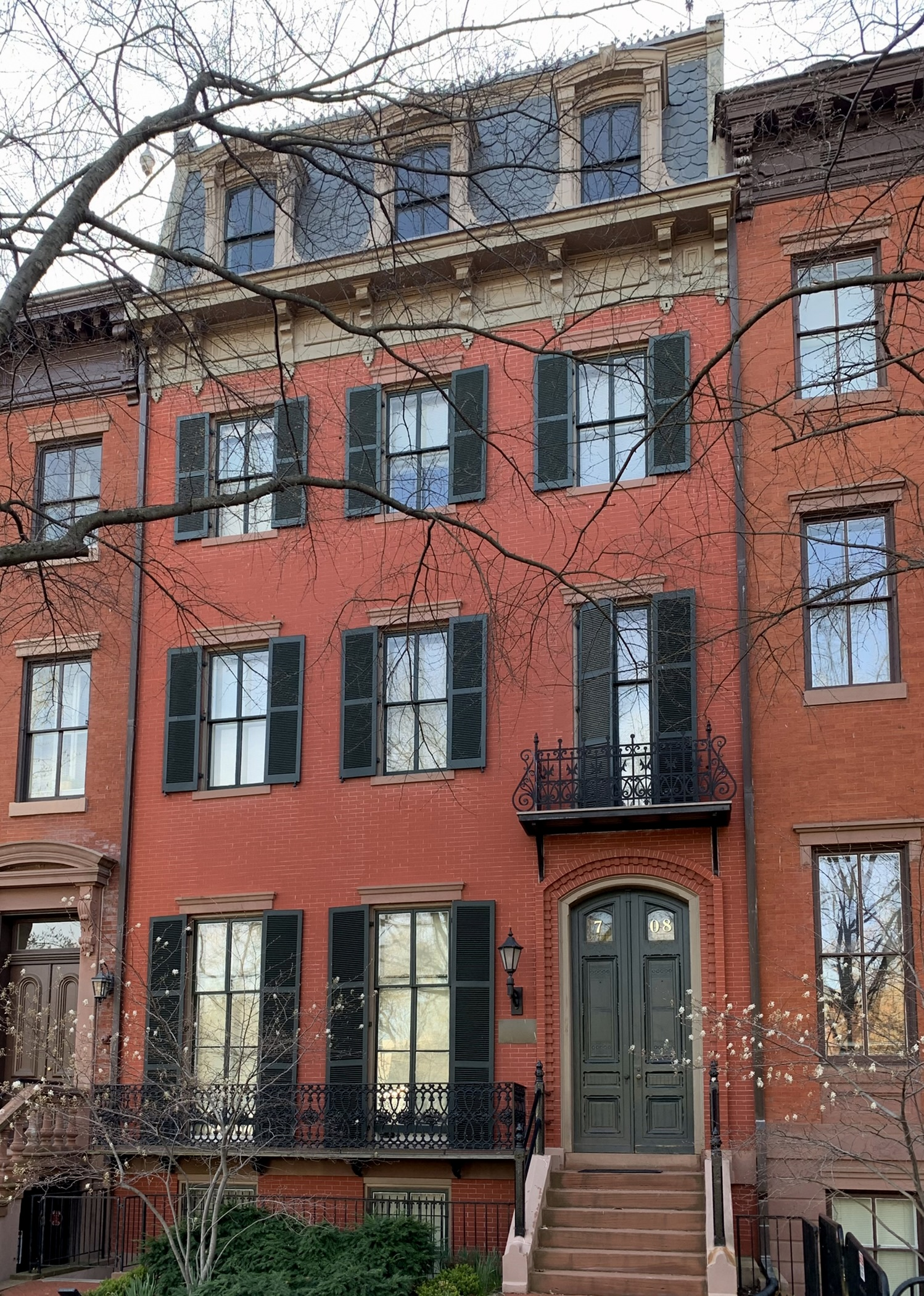
Trowbridge House in Washington, D.C.

During his residence in Washington, D.C., Trowbridge built a town house on Lafayette Square adjacent to the Blair House, now the official state guest house of the President of the United States. In 2005, renovations on the home were undertaken to convert it to a guest residence for former U.S. presidents.

A home Trowbridge erected in 1871 on Prospect Hill in New Haven, Connecticut, is now part of the Yale University campus.

Military offices
Preceded by Samuel E. Merwin	Connecticut Adjutant General; 1873-1876	Succeeded by William B. Franklin
