= James S. Brady Press Briefing Room =

Briefing room in the White House

Coordinates: 38.89771°N 77.03567°W

Former White House press secretary Katie Zacharia taking questions in the room in her first and only press briefing, October 2026

The James S. Brady Press Briefing Room is a small theater in the West Wing of the White House where the White House press secretary gives briefings to the news media and the president of the United States sometimes addresses the press and the nation. It is located between the workspace assigned to the White House press corps and the office of the press secretary.

The White House Correspondents' Association organizes the James S. Brady Press Briefing Room seating chart (viewable at the bottom of this page), which currently seats 49 reporters.

== History ==
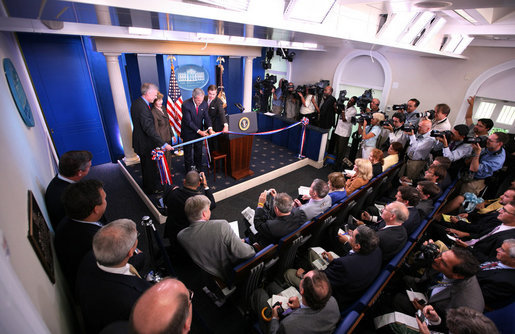
President George W. Bush participates in the unveiling of the new Brady Briefing Room on July 11, 2007.

The first presidential press conference was held in March 1913 in the Oval Office, during the Woodrow Wilson administration. Then, until 1969, communications from the president and general press news conferences took place in various locations, including the Indian Treaty Room, the State Department auditorium, and East Room of the White House.

In 1969, to accommodate the growing number of reporters assigned to the White House, President Richard Nixon had the indoor swimming pool, which had been installed by the March of Dimes for Franklin D. Roosevelt, covered and turned into press offices and a lounge that could double as a briefing room.

From August to November 1981, the room was refurbished at a cost of $160,566 after the General Services Administration found the terrace roof over the press center was about to collapse; first families had hosted parties there. The White House press corps was moved to temporary quarters in the fourth-floor auditorium of the Old Executive Office Building. 48 theater-style seats, blue and white tweed wall-to-wall carpeting, off-white wall coverings and a larger podium were added. On November 9, 1981, President Ronald Reagan and White House Press Secretary James Brady cut a red white and blue ribbon to open the remodeled facility. It was Brady's first official White House appearance since he had been shot on March 30 during an assassination attempt on Reagan. In 2000, the room was named the "James S. Brady Press Briefing Room" in his honor.

=== Renovation ===
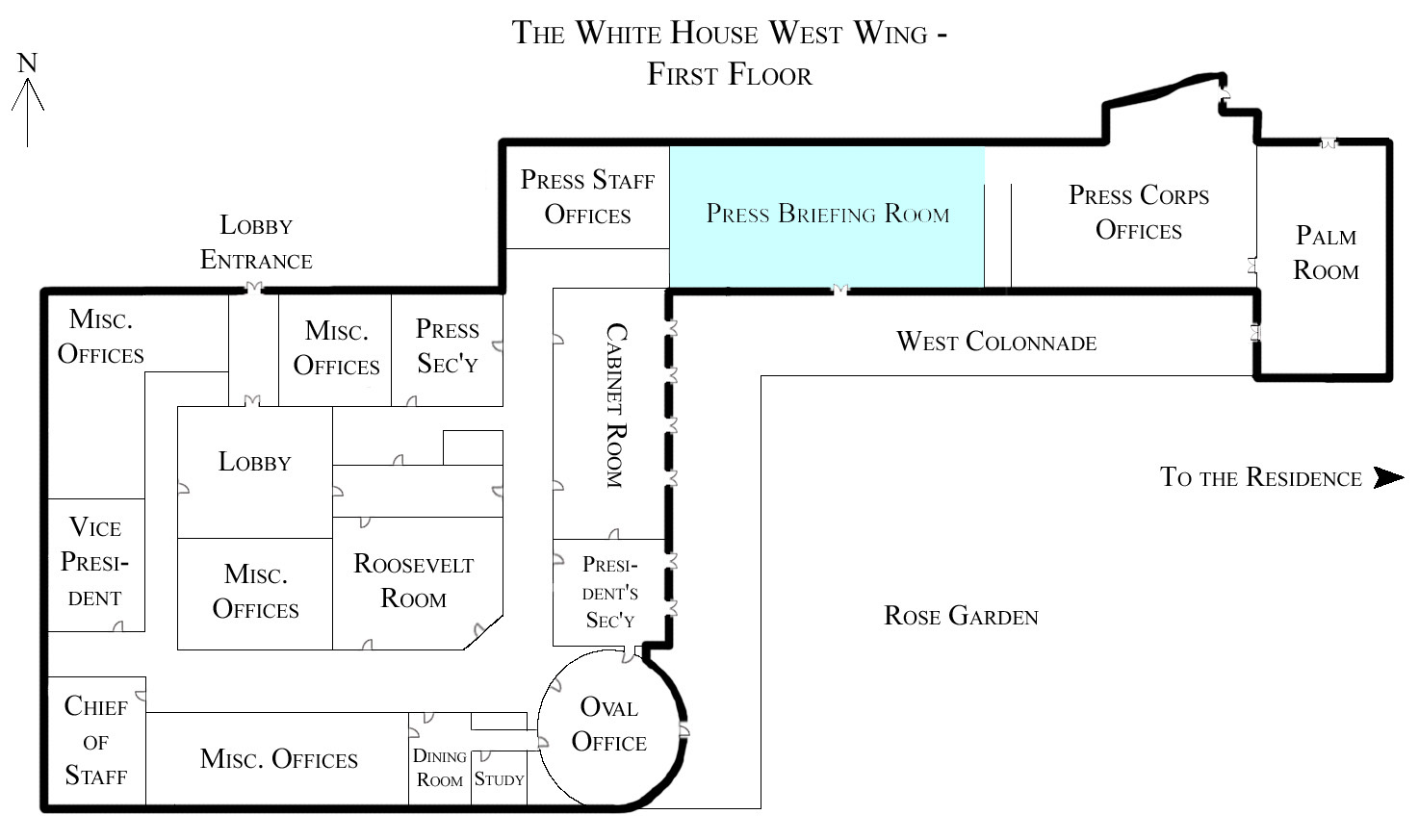
Map of the West Wing of the White House with James S. Brady Press Briefing Room highlighted in blue

In December 2005, the White House announced the intention to renovate the aging Press Briefing Room and cramped press corps offices. On August 2, 2006, the final briefing was held, and President George W. Bush hosted several previous press secretaries at a closing ceremony and there was some hesitation and concern about whether the press would be allowed to return to the White House. In the interim, the White House Conference Center was used as temporary location for press conferences.

President Bush reopened the renovated room in a ribbon-cutting ceremony on the morning of July 11, 2007. He held his first formal press conference in the new briefing room the next day, following the release of a report on the progress of the Iraqi government. The modernization cost nearly US$8.5 million. Of that sum, $2.5 million was funded by the media, and the remainder was funded from tax revenue. Each correspondent's seat was priced at $1,500. Beneath the current press room lies the former White House swimming pool that has since become a computer server room.
